= United States at the 2003 Pan American Games =

- IOC code: USA
- NOC: United States Olympic Committee
- Website: www.teamusa.org

in Santo Domingo 1–17 August 2003
- Flag bearer: Carl Eichenlaub
- Medals Ranked 1st: Gold 117 Silver 80 Bronze 73 Total 270

Pan American Games appearances (overview)
- 1951; 1955; 1959; 1963; 1967; 1971; 1975; 1979; 1983; 1987; 1991; 1995; 1999; 2003; 2007; 2011; 2015; 2019; 2023; 2027

The United States sent a delegation to 14th Pan American Games in Santo Domingo, Dominican Republic from August 1–17, 2003. At the 2003 Pan Ams, the USA garnered 270 medals: 117 gold, 80 silver and 73 bronze.

== Medals ==
=== Gold ===
===== Archery =====
- Men's Recurve Individual: Vic Wunderle
- Men's Recurve Team: Guy Krueger, Glenn Meyers, and Vic Wunderle
- Women's Recurve Individual: Jennifer Nichols
- Women's Recurve Team: Jennifer Nichols, Stephanie Miller, and Janet Dykman

===== Athletics =====
- Men's 200 metres: Kenneth Brokenburr
- Men's 400 metres: Mitch Potter
- Men's Pole Vault: Toby Stevenson
- Men's Shot Put: Reese Hoffa
- Men's Decathlon: Stephen Moore
- Women's 100 metres: Lauryn Williams
- Women's 400m Hurdles: Joanna Hayes
- Women's 4 × 100 m Relay: Angela Williams, Consuella Moore, Angela Daigle, and Lauryn Williams
- Women's 4 × 400 m Relay: Me'Lisa Barber, Moushaumi Robinson, Julian Clay, and De'Hashia Trotter
- Women's Pole Vault: Melissa Mueller
- Women's Discus: Aretha Hill
- Women's Javelin: Kim Kreiner
- Women's Heptathlon: Tiffany Lott-Hogan

===== Badminton =====
- Men's Doubles: Howard Bach and Kevin Han

===== Bowling =====
- Men's Doubles: Bill Hoffman and Scott Pohl
- Women's Singles: Shannon Pluhowsky

===== Boxing =====
- Men's Super Heavyweight (+ 91 kg): Jason Estrada

===== Canoeing =====
- Women's K-1 500m: Ruth Nortje
- Women's K-2 500m: Ruth Nortje and Kathryn Colin

===== Cycling =====
- Men's Mountainbike: Jeremiah Bishop
- Women's Sprint: Tanya Lindenmuth
- Women's Keirin: Tanya Lindenmuth
- Women's Individual Road Time Trial: Kimberly Bruckner

===== Equestrian =====
- Jumping Team: Chris Kappler, Margie Goldstein-Engle, Lauren Hough, and Beezie Madden
- Dressage Team: Jan Ebeling, Pierre St. Jacques, Kristina Harrison-Naness, and Carol Lavell

===== Fencing =====
- Men's Foil Individual: Dan Kellner
- Men's Foil Team: Jed Dupree, Dan Kellner, Soren Thompson, and Jonathan Tiomkin
- Men's Sabre Individual: Ivan Lee
- Men's Sabre Team: Weston Kelsey, Ivan Lee, Jason Rogers, and Adam Crompton
- Women's Sabre Individual: Sada Jacobson

===== Karate =====
- Men's Kumite (– 80 kg): John Fonseca

===== Racquetball =====
- Men's Singles: Jack Huczek

===== Sailing =====
- Men's J/24: Tim Healy, Gordon Borges, Davenport Crocker, and Nick Judson
- Women's Mistral: Lanee Butler

===== Squash =====
- Women's Singles: Latasha Khan
- Women's Team: Latasha Khan, Louisa Hall, Meredeth Quick

===== Swimming =====
- Men's 100m Backstroke: Peter Marshall
- Men's 100m Breaststroke: Mark Gangloff
- Men's 200m Breaststroke: Kyle Salyards
- Men's 100 m Butterfly: Ben Michaelson
- Men's 200 m Butterfly: Michael Raab
- Men's 400 m IM: Robert Margalis
- Men's 400 m Free Relay
- Men's 400 m Medley Relay
- Women's 50m Freestyle: Kara Lynn Joyce
- Women's 100m Freestyle: Courtney Shealy
- Women's 200m Freestyle: Dana Vollmer
- Women's 400m Freestyle: Elizabeth Hill
- Women's 800m Freestyle: Morgan Hentzen
- Women's 100m Backstroke: Diana MacManus
- Women's 200m Backstroke: Jamie Reid
- Women's 100m Breaststroke: Staciana Stitts
- Women's 200m Breaststroke: Alexi Spann
- Women's 100m Butterfly: Bethany Goodwin
- Women's 400 m Free Relay
- Women's 800 m Free Relay
- Women's 400 m Medley Relay

===== Water polo =====
- Men's Team Competition: National Team
- Women's Team Competition: National Team

===== Weightlifting =====
- Men's – 77 kg: Chad Vaughn
- Women's – 48 kg: Tara Nott

=== Silver ===
===== Archery =====
- Men's Recurve Individual: Guy Krueger

===== Athletics =====
- Men's 100 metres: Mardy Scales
- Men's 1,500 metres: Michael Stember
- Men's 110m Hurdles: Larry Wade
- Men's 400m Hurdles: Eric Thomas
- Men's 4 × 400 m Relay: Mitchell Potter, Ja'Warren Hooker, Adam Steele, and James Davis
- Men's High Jump: Jamie Nieto
- Men's Pole Vault: Russ Buller
- Men's Hammer: James Parker
- Women's 100 metres: Angela Williams
- Women's 1,500 metres: Mary Jayne Harrelson
- Women's Triple Jump: Yuliana Perez

===== Baseball =====
- Men's Team Competition: United States of America.

===== Basketball =====
- Women's Team Competition: United States

- Jenni Benningfield, Rebekkah Brunson, Jamie Carey, Roneeka Hodges, Laurie Koehn, Janel McCarville, Loree Moore, Nicole Powell, Ann Strother, Lindsay Taylor, Iciss Tillis, and Barbara Turner. Head Coach: Debbie Ryan

===== Bowling =====
- Women's Doubles: Shannon Pluhowsky and Stacy Werth

===== Boxing =====
- Men's Featherweight (– 57 kg): Aaron Garcia
- Men's Welterweight (– 69 kg): Juan McPherson

===== Canoeing =====
- Men's K-2 1,000m: Benjie Lewis and Brandon Woods
- Women's K-4 500m: Ruth Nortje, Sonrisa Reed, Kari-Jean McKenzie and Kathryn Colin

===== Cycling =====
- Men's Individual Road Time Trial: Chris Baldwin
- Men's Individual Track Time Trial: Christian Stahl
- Men's Keirin: Giddeon Massie
- Women's Mountainbike: Mary McConneloug

===== Equestrian =====
- Jumping Individual: Chris Kappler riding Royal Kaliber

===== Fencing =====
- Men's Foil Individual: Jonathan Tiomkin
- Women's Épée Team: Kelley Hurley, Stephanie Eim, and Elisabeth Spilman
- Women's Foil Individual: Emily Cross

===== Karate =====
- Men's Kata: Clay Morton
- Women's Kata: Junko Arai

===== Racquetball =====
- Men's Doubles: Rubén González & Mike Guidry
- Women's Singles: Laura Fenton
- Women's Doubles: Jackie Rice & Kim Russell

===== Swimming =====
- Men's 200m Freestyle: Dan Ketchum
- Men's 400m Freestyle: Fran Crippen
- Men's 1500m Freestyle: Fran Crippen
- Men's 200m Backstroke: Luke Wagner
- Men's 100m Breaststroke: Jarrod Marrs
- Men's 200m Breaststroke: Sean Quinn
- Men's 400 m IM: Eric Donnelly
- Women's 100m Freestyle: Christina Swindle
- Women's 200m Freestyle: Colleen Lanné
- Women's 400m Freestyle: Morgan Hentzen
- Women's 800m Freestyle: Rachael Burke
- Women's 100m Backstroke: Courtney Shealy
- Women's 200m Backstroke: Diana MacManus
- Women's 100m Breaststroke: Corrie Clark
- Women's 200m Butterfly: Noelle Bassi
- Women's 200m IM: Corrie Clark
- Women's 200m IM: Kristen Caverly

=== Bronze ===
===== Archery =====
- Women's Recurve Individual: Stephanie Miller

===== Athletics =====
- Men's 1,500 metres: Grant Robison
- Men's 10,000 metres: Dan Browne
- Men's 3,000m Steeple: Anthony Famiglietti
- Men's High Jump: Terrance Woods
- Men's Javelin: Breaux Greer
- Women's 200 metres: Allyson Felix
- Women's 5,000 metres: Nicole Jefferson
- Women's 20 km Walk: Joanne Dow

===== Badminton =====
- Mixed Doubles: May Mangkalakiri and Rajiv Rai

===== Bowling =====
- Men's Singles: Bill Hoffman

===== Boxing =====
- Men's Heavyweight (– 91 kg): Devin Vargas

===== Canoeing =====
- Men's K-1 1,000m: Rami Zur

===== Cycling =====
- Men's Sprint: Giddeon Massie
- Men's Madison: Colby Pearce and James Carney
- Women's Individual Road Time Trial: Kristin Armstrong
- Women's Sprint: Chris Witty

===== Diving =====
- Men's 3m Springboard: Troy Dumais
- Men's 3m Synchronized Springboard: Troy Dumais and Justin Dumais
- Men's 10m Synchronized Platform: Kyle Prandi and Mark Ruiz
- Women's 3m Springboard Synchronized: Sara Hildebrand and Cassandra Cardinell

===== Equestrian =====
- Jumping Individual: Margie Goldstein-Engle riding Perin

===== Fencing =====
- Men's Sabre Individual: Jason Rogers
- Women's Foil Individual: Erinn Smart
- Women's Sabre Individual: Emily Jacobson

===== Handball =====
- Men's Team Competition: United States

===== Racquetball =====
- Men's Singles: Rocky Carson

===== Karate =====
- Women's Kumite (– 58 kg): Cheryl Murphy

===== Squash =====
- Men's Singles: Preston Quick

===== Swimming =====
- Men's 50m Freestyle: Gary Hall Jr.
- Men's 1500m Freestyle: Chris Thompson
- Men's 100m Backstroke: Jayme Cramer
- Men's 200m Backstroke: Joey Faltraco
- Men's 200 m IM: Eric Donnelly
- Women's 100m Butterfly: Dana Kirk
- Women's 200m Butterfly: Dana Kirk
- Women's 200m IM: Laura Davis

== Results by event ==
=== Athletics ===
Track

Athlete	Event	Heat		Final	
Athlete	Event	Time	Rank	Time	Rank
Mardy Scales	Men's 100 m	10.33	2	10.22	2nd place, silver medalist(s)
Mickey Grimes	Men's 100 m	10.20	1	DSQ	—
Mary Jayne Harrelson	Women's 1500 m	—	—	4:09.72	2nd place, silver medalist(s)
Lauren Simmons	Women's 1500 m	—	—	DNS	—
Nicole Jefferson	Women's 5000 m	—	—	15:42.40	3rd place, bronze medalist(s)
Ann-Marie Brooks	Women's 5000 m	—	—	16:31.51	6
Dan Browne	Men's 10000 m	—	—	29:06.23	3rd place, bronze medalist(s)
Weldon Johnson	Men's 10000 m	—	—	DNF	—
Kimberly Fitchen-Young	Women's 10000 m	—	—	34:15.09	4
Jennifer Crain	Women's 10000 m	—	—	34:40.19	6
Eric Thomas	Men's 400 m hurdles	48.91	1	48.74	2nd place, silver medalist(s)
Regan Nichols	Men's 400 m hurdles	50.01	5	50.31	5
Joanna Hayes	Women's 400 m hurdles	55.64	1	54.77	1st place, gold medalist(s)
Brenda Taylor	Women's 400 m hurdles	55.76	2	55.27	4
Anthony Famiglietti	Men's 3000 m steeplechase	—	—	8:40.22	3rd place, bronze medalist(s)
Tom Chorny	Men's 3000 m steeplechase	—	—	8:45.35	4

Road

Athlete	Event	Time	Rank
Chris Banks	Men's marathon	2:32:22	8
Jeff Campbell	Men's marathon	2:36:31	10
Stacie Albourcek	Women's marathon	2:55:14	9
Kelly Flathers	Women's marathon	2:59:05	10
Timothy Seaman	Men's 20 km race walk	1:33:24	7
John Nunn	Men's 20 km race walk	1:35:34	8
Joanne Dow	Women's 20 km race walk	1:35:48	3rd place, bronze medalist(s)
Amber Antonia	Women's 20 km race walk	1:42:45	8
Philip Dunn	Men's 50 km race walk	4:25:50	5
Sean Albert	Men's 50 km race walk	DSQ	—

Field

Athlete	Event	Throws						Total	
Athlete	Event	1	2	3	4	5	6	Distance	Rank
Breaux Greer	Men's javelin throw	77.83	X	X	X	77.74	79.21	79.21 m	3rd place, bronze medalist(s)
Rob Minnitti	Men's javelin throw	67.24	71.64	68.52	X	71.04	70.72	71.64 m	8
Kim Kreiner	Women's javelin throw	X	53.88	55.50	58.56	56.78	60.86	60.86 m	1st place, gold medalist(s)
Erika Wheeler	Women's javelin throw	X	53.08	X	52.69	X	50.25	53.08 m	6
James Parker	Men's hammer throw	71.70	74.34	73.00	73.95	X	74.35	74.35 m	2nd place, silver medalist(s)
John McEwen	Men's hammer throw	66.87	68.42	71.49	68.34	X	X	71.49 m	3rd place, bronze medalist(s)
Anna Mahon	Women's hammer throw	63.83	67.00	64.80	64.37	66.28	67.09	67.09 m	4
Dawn Ellerbe	Women's hammer throw	63.23	X	65.75	X	60.81	64.28	65.75 m	5
Josh Ralston	Men's discus throw	54.14	56.48	X	X	59.57	X	59.57 m	4
Doug Reynolds	Men's discus throw	X	56.10	58.49	58.60	58.39	—	58.60 m	6
Aretha Hill	Women's discus throw	57.27	61.27	58.63	63.30	57.99	60.29	63.30 m	1st place, gold medalist(s)
Suzanne Powell	Women's discus throw	59.30	59.97	60.00	X	X	X	60.00 m	4
Reese Hoffa	Men's shot put	19.37	20.95	19.66	X	X	X	20.95 m	1st place, gold medalist(s)
Daniel Taylor	Men's shot put	19.16	X	X	19.69	19.46	X	19.69 m	4
Laura Gerraughty	Women's shot put	17.24	17.09	X	X	17.33	X	17.33 m	5
Kristin Heaston	Women's shot put	15.94	16.55	16.30	X	X	X	16.55 m	7

Decathlon

Athlete	Decathlon										Total	
Athlete	1	2	3	4	5	6	7	8	9	10	Points	Rank
Stephen Moore	10.75	7.30	11.83	2.10	48.16	14.79	42.44	4.50	50.35	4:41.71	7809	1st place, gold medalist(s)
Kip Janvrin	11.28	6.75	14.07	—	—	—	—	—	—	—	DNF	—

Heptathlon

Athlete	Heptathlon							Total	
Athlete	1	2	3	4	5	6	7	Points	Rank
Tiffany Lott-Hogan	13.15	1.68	13.78	24.59	6.02	49.52	2:27.74	6064	1st place, gold medalist(s)
Melissa Vanek	14.06	1.74	—	—	—	—	—	DNF	—

=== Basketball ===
==== Men's team competition ====
- Rickey Paulding
- Chris Hill
- Ben Gordon
- Andre Barrett
- Blake Stepp
- Luke Jackson
- Chuck Hayes
- Brandon Mouton
- Arthur Johnson
- Emeka Okafor
- Ike Diogu
- Josh Childress
- Head coach: Tom Izzo

==== Women's team competition ====
- Preliminary round

- Lost to Cuba (62-84)
- Defeated Canada (56-53)
- Defeated Brazil (77-64)
- Defeated Argentina (93-78)
- Defeated Dominican Republic (109-54)

- Semifinal

- Defeated Brazil (75-69)

- Final

- Lost to Cuba (64-75) → Silver Medal

- Team roster

- Jenni Benningfield
- Rebekkah Brunson
- Jamie Carey
- Roneeka Hodges
- Laurie Koehn
- Janel McCarville
- Loree Moore
- Nicole Powell
- Ann Strother
- Lindsay Taylor
- Iciss Tillis
- Barbara Turner

- Head coach: Debbie Ryan

=== Boxing ===
Athlete	Event	Round of 16	Quarterfinals	Semifinals	Final
Athlete	Event	Opposition Result	Opposition Result	Opposition Result	Opposition Result
Rayonta Whitfield	Light Flyweight	Silva (BRA); W 39–17	Bartelemí (CUB); L 8–16	did not advance	
Aaron Garcia	Featherweight	Bye	Velasquez (PUR); W +10-10	Aguilera (CUB); W 16–14	Ramos (COL); L 12-33 → (silver)
Juan McPherson	Welterweight	Bye	Guerrero (ECU); W RSCO-3	Angulo (MEX); W AB-4	Aragón (CUB); L 30-11 → (silver)
Andre Dirrell	Middleweight	Despaigne (CUB); L 20–21	did not advance		
Devin Vargas	Heavyweight	Bye	Cardoso (BRA); W RSC-4	Manswell (TRI); L 12-14 → (bronze)	did not advance

=== Cycling ===
==== Mountain Bike ====
- Jeremiah Bishop

- Men's Cross Country — 2:10.39 (→ 1st place)

- Jeremy Horgan

- Men's Cross Country — did not finish (→ no ranking)

- Mary McConneloug

- Women's Cross Country — + 2.50 (→ 2nd place)

=== Judo ===
==== Men's Competition ====
- Alex Ottiano
- Brian Olson
- Chuck Jefferson
- Michael Barnes
- Aaron Cohen
- Taylor Takata
- Martin Boonzaayer

==== Women's Competition ====
- Sayaka Matsumoto
- Grace Jividen
- Charlee Minkin
- Ellen Wilson
- Christina Yannetsos
- Jill Collins
- Nanoushka St. Pre

=== Swimming ===
==== Men's Competition ====
Athlete	Event	Heat		Final	
Athlete	Event	Time	Rank	Time	Rank
Gary Hall, Jr.	50 m freestyle	22.51	2	22.43	3rd place, bronze medalist(s)
Chris McCrary	50 m freestyle	23.35	10	23.43	10
Tommy Hannan	100 m freestyle	50.47	3	50.66	7
Nick Brunelli	100 m freestyle	50.63	5	50.04	4
Dan Ketchum	200 m freestyle	1:51.09	3	1:49.34	2nd place, silver medalist(s)
Jeff Lee	200 m freestyle	1:51.95	4	1:50.76	4
Fran Crippen	400 m freestyle	3:52.66	1	3:52.62	2nd place, silver medalist(s)
Davis Tarwater	400 m freestyle	3:59.15	6	3:58.57	6
Fran Crippen	1500 m freestyle	—		15:19.63	2nd place, silver medalist(s)
Chris Thompson	1500 m freestyle	—		15:19.64	3rd place, bronze medalist(s)
Peter Marshall	100 m backstroke	55.96	1	55.52	1st place, gold medalist(s)
Jayme Cramer	100 m backstroke	56.07	2	55.88	3rd place, bronze medalist(s)
Luke Wagner	200 m backstroke	2:02.13	1	2:00.74	2nd place, silver medalist(s)
Joey Faltraco	200 m backstroke	2:02.48	2	2:01.31	3rd place, bronze medalist(s)
Mark Gangloff	100 m breaststroke	1:02.04	1	1:00.95	1st place, gold medalist(s)
Jarrod Marrs	100 m breaststroke	1:02.15	2	1:01.71	2nd place, silver medalist(s)
Kyle Salyards	200 m breaststroke	2:16.76	1	2:13.37	1st place, gold medalist(s)
Sean Quinn	200 m breaststroke	2:20.46	7	2:15.77	2nd place, silver medalist(s)
Ben Michaelson	100 m butterfly	53.55	1	53.04	1st place, gold medalist(s)
Tommy Hannan	100 m butterfly	53.43	1	54.06	6
Michael Raab	200 m butterfly	1:57.54	1	1:57.33	1st place, gold medalist(s)
Eric Donnelly	200 m butterfly	2:01.03	5	2:00.04	5
Eric Donnelly	200 m medley	2:04.48	3	2:02.52	3rd place, bronze medalist(s)
James Galloway	200 m medley	2:04.75	5	2:02.74	4
Robert Margalis	400 m medley	4:24.00	2	4:19.09	1st place, gold medalist(s)
Eric Donnelly	400 m medley	4:23.52	1	4:19.65	2nd place, silver medalist(s)

==== Women's Competition ====
Athlete	Event	Heat		Final	
Athlete	Event	Time	Rank	Time	Rank
Kara Lynn Joyce	50 m freestyle	25.29	1	25.24	1st place, gold medalist(s)
Colleen Lanne	50 m freestyle	26.10	10	25.84	5
Courtney Shealy	100 m freestyle	55.91	1	55.61	1st place, gold medalist(s)
Colleen Lanne	100 m freestyle	56.23	3	55.92	2nd place, silver medalist(s)
Dana Vollmer	200 m freestyle	2:01.88	1	1:59.80	1st place, gold medalist(s)
Colleen Lanne	200 m freestyle	2:03.45	2	2:01.98	2nd place, silver medalist(s)
Elizabeth Hill	400 m freestyle	4:16.26	1	4:10.18	1st place, gold medalist(s)
Morgan Hentzen	400 m freestyle	4:16.93	2	4:13.03	2nd place, silver medalist(s)
Morgan Hentzen	800 m freestyle	—		8:36.54	1st place, gold medalist(s)
Rachel Burke	800 m freestyle	—		8:37.61	2nd place, silver medalist(s)
Alexi Spann	200 m breaststroke	2:30.94	1	2:29.76	1st place, gold medalist(s)
Melissa Klein	200 m breaststroke	2:33.07	2	2:33.63	4

=== Triathlon ===
Athlete	Event	Race			Total	
Athlete	Event	Swim	Bike	Run	Time	Rank
Hunter Kemper	Men's Individual	19:57.900	57:45.300	33:22.400	01:52:00	1st place, gold medalist(s)
Doug Friman	Men's Individual	19:49.600	57:54.700	34:49.900	01:53:11	4
Victor Plata	Men's Individual	20:06.600	59:28.800	36:45.100	01:57:24	15
Sheila Taormina	Women's Individual	18:30.500	1:02:15.300	39:26.200	02:00:12	2nd place, silver medalist(s)
Becky Gibbs	Women's Individual	18:36.200	1:02:12.300	39:48.200	02:00:36	3rd place, bronze medalist(s)
Julie Swail	Women's Individual	18:52.300	1:05:05.300	40:22.100	02:04:19	8

== See also ==
- United States at the 2004 Summer Olympics
