= Swimming at the 2003 Pan American Games – Women's 100 metre butterfly =

The Women's 100m Butterfly event at the 2003 Pan American Games took place on August 15, 2003 (Day 15 of the Games).

== Medalists ==
Gold	Bethany Goodwin; United States
Silver	Audrey Lacroix; Canada
Bronze	Dana Kirk; United States

== Records ==
World Record	Inge de Bruijn (NED)	56.61	2000-09-17	Sydney, Australia
Pan Am Record	Karen Campbell (USA)	59.70	1999-08-05	Winnipeg, Canada

== Results ==
Place	Swimmer	Heats		Final
Place	Swimmer	Time	Rank	Time
1	Bethany Goodwin (USA)	1:00.31	2	59.97
2	Audrey Lacroix (CAN)	1:00.08	1	1:00.18
3	Dana Kirk (USA)	1:00.69	3	1:00.51
4	Elizabeth Collins (CAN)	1:03.26	5	1:02.76
5	Ivi Monteiro (BRA)	1:02.36	4	1:02.90
6	María Rodríguez (VEN)	1:03.79	6	1:03.01
7	Atenas Lopez (MEX)	1:04.03	8	1:03.68
8	Tamara Swaby (JAM)	1:03.95	7	1:03.95
9	Paola España (MEX)	1:04.15	10	1:03.97
10	Marcella Amar (BRA)	1:05.24	12	1:04.65
11	Vanessa Duenas (COL)	1:04.11	9	1:04.93
12	Sharntelle McLean (TRI)	1:04.59	11	1:05.00
13	Yamile Bahamonde (ECU)	1:05.41	13	1:05.13
14	Heather Roffey (CAY)	1:05.99	14	1:06.33
15	Vanessa Martínez (PUR)	1:06.35	15	1:06.71
16	Priscila Zacarias (DOM)	1:07.06	16	1:07.23
17	Geraldine Arce (NCA)	1:08.33	17	
18	Alicia García (PER)	1:08.56	18	
19	April Knowles (BAH)	1:11.05	19	
