= Swimming at the 2003 Pan American Games – Men's 100 metre butterfly =

The Men's 100 Butterfly event at the 2003 Pan American Games took place on August 13, 2003 (Day 12 of the Games). Benjamin Michaelson (USA) won the 100 butterfly in 53.04, bettering the Games record of 53.33.

== Medalists ==
Gold	Benjamin Michaelson; United States
Silver	José Meolans; Argentina
Bronze	Kaio Almeida; Brazil

== Records ==
World Record	Ian Crocker (USA)	50.98	2003-07-26	Barcelona, Spain
Pan Am Record	Francisco Sánchez (VEN)	53.33	1999-08-03	Winnipeg, Canada

== Results ==
Place	Swimmer	Heats		Final
Place	Swimmer	Time	Rank	Time
1	Ben Michaelson (USA)	53.55	1	53.04 GR
2	José Meolans (ARG)	54.34	5	53.28
3	Kaio Almeida (BRA)	54.23	3	53.44 NR
4	Josh Ilika (MEX)	54.34	6	53.46
5	Luis Rojas (VEN)	54.45	8	53.95
6	Tommy Hannan (USA)	53.43	1	54.06
7	Gabriel Mangabeira (BRA)	54.44	7	54.25
8	Andrew Livingston (PUR)	54.27	4	54.58
9	Camilo Becerra (COL)	54.81	9	54.62
10	Eduardo Otero (ARG)	54.83	10	54.79
11	Octavio Alesi (VEN)	56.07	13	54.92
12	Juan Pablo Valdivieso (PER)	55.77	12	55.99
13	Chris Vythoulkas (BAH)	55.76	11	56.39
14	Devin Saez (ESA)	57.23	14	56.55
15	William Muriel (ECU)	57.59	15	57.25
16	Sergio Cabrera (PAR)	57.67	16	57.95
17	José Rodríguez (DOM)	57.70	17	
18	Gordon Touw Ngie Tjouw (SUR)	57.99	18	
19	Scott Henley (ISV)	58.61	19	
20	Sergio de Leon (GUA)	59.17	20	
21	Carlos Prudencio (BOL)	59.24	21	
22	Cliff Gittens (BAR)	59.26	22	
23	Davy Bisslik (ARU)	59.33	23	
24	Timothy Wong (JAM)	59.60	24	
25	Roy Barahona (HON)	59.95	25	
