= Swimming at the 2003 Pan American Games – Women's 100 metre freestyle =

The Women's 100m Freestyle event at the 2003 Pan American Games took place on August 12, 2003 (Day 11 of the Games).

== Medalists ==
Gold	Courtney Shealy; United States
Silver	Florencia Szigeti; Argentina
Silver	Christina Swindle; United States

== Records ==
Record	Athlete	Time	Date	Venue
World Record	Inge de Bruijn (NED)	53.77	2000-09-20	Sydney, Australia
Pan Am Record	Angel Martino (USA)	55.62	1995-03-12	Mar del Plata, Argentina

== Results ==
Place	Swimmer	Heats		Final
Place	Swimmer	Time	Rank	Time
1	Courtney Shealy (USA)	55.91	1	55.61 GR
2	Florencia Szigeti (ARG)	56.73	4	55.92
2	Christina Swindle (USA)	56.23	3	55.92
4	Flávia Delaroli (BRA)	56.95	5	56.41
5	Eileen Coparropa (PAN)	55.98	1	56.58
6	Arlene Semeco (VEN)	57.10	6	57.17
7	Rebeca Gusmão (BRA)	57.55	7	57.43
8	Elizabeth Collins (CAN)	57.63	8	57.44
9	Janelle Atkinson (JAM)	57.97	11	57.21 NR
10	Angela Chuck (JAM)	57.72	9	57.68
11	Maya Beaudry (CAN)	57.93	10	57.69
12	Alejandra Galan (MEX)	58.92	12	58.64
13	Carolina Rivera (VEN)	59.88	14	58.99
14	Sharntelle McLean (TRI)	59.52	13	59.55
15	Patricia Jimenez (PUR)	1:00.10	16	1:00.24
16	Carolina Moreno (MEX)	59.96	15	1:00.48
17	Marianella Marín (CRC)	1:00.13	17	
18	Melanie Slowing (GUA)	1:00.19	18	
19	Linda McEachrane (TRI)	1:00.21	19	
20	Yamile Bahamnode (ECU)	1:00.24	20	
21	Maria Wong (PER)	1:00.32	21	
22	Kiera Aitken (BER)	1:00.69	22	
23	Nikia Deveaux (BAH)	1:01.19	23	
24	Carolina Regalado (DOM)	1:03.34	24	
25	Sade Daal (SUR)	1:04.62	25	
26	Janna Williams (DMA)	1:16.35	26	
