= Swimming at the 2003 Pan American Games – Women's 200 metre butterfly =

The Women's 200m Butterfly event at the 2003 Pan American Games took place on August 17, 2003 (Day 16 of the Games).

== Medalists ==
Gold	Audrey Lacroix; Canada
Silver	Noelle Bassi; United States
Bronze	Dana Kirk; United States

== Records ==
Record	Athlete	Time	Date	Venue
World Record	Otylia Jędrzejczak (POL)	2:05.78	2002-08-04	Berlin, Germany
Pan Am Record	Jessica Deglau (CAN)	2:09.63	1999-08-07	Winnipeg, Canada

== Results ==
Place	Swimmer	Heats		Final
Place	Swimmer	Time	Rank	Time
1	Audrey Lacroix (CAN)	2:15.74	5	2:11.02
2	Noelle Bassi (USA)	2:13.47	1	2:12.81
3	Dana Kirk (USA)	2:15.59	3	2:12.85
4	Georgina Bardach (ARG)	2:15.70	4	2:13.23
5	Julie Gravelle (CAN)	2:15.01	2	2:13.83
6	Monique Ferreira (BRA)	2:19.65	6	2:15.57
7	María Rodríguez (VEN)	2:20.51	7	2:20.19
8	Sonia Álvarez (PUR)	2:21.04	8	2:21.10
9	Heather Roffey (CAY)	2:21.31	9	2:19.96
10	Marcella Amar (BRA)	2:22.91	12	2:20.07
11	Paola España (MEX)	2:22.07	10	2:20.71
12	Jimena del Pozo (PER)	2:23.56	14	2:23.03
13	Alicia García (PER)	2:23.55	13	2:23.53
14	Tamara Swaby (JAM)	2:29.73	16	2:27.85
15	Vanessa Martínez (PUR)	2:27.97	15	2:28.90
16	Vanessa Duenas (COL)	2:22.14	11	scratched
