= Swimming at the 2003 Pan American Games – Men's 200 metre backstroke =

The Men's 200m Backstroke event at the 2003 Pan American Games took place on August 14, 2003 (Day 13 of the Games). Brazil's Rogério Romero (33) added another gold in the 200 backstroke in 1:59.92. Romero first won this event in 1991 and a silver in 1995.

== Medalists ==
Gold	Rogério Romero; Brazil
Silver	Luke Wagner; United States
Bronze	Joey Faltraco; United States

== Records ==
World Record	Aaron Peirsol (USA)	1:55.15	2002-03-20	(United States) Minneapolis, Minnesota
Pan Am Record	Leonardo Costa (BRA)	1:59.33	1999-08-04	Winnipeg, Canada

== Results ==
Place	Swimmer	Heats		Final
Place	Swimmer	Time	Rank	Time
1	Rogério Romero (BRA)	2:04.58	4	1:59.92
2	Luke Wagner (USA)	2:02.13	1	2:00.74
3	Joey Faltraco (USA)	2:02.48	2	2:01.31
4	Nicholas Neckles (BAR)	2:05.47	7	2:04.30
5	Paulo Machado (BRA)	2:04.65	5	2:04.41
6	Sean Sepulis (CAN)	2:03.62	3	2:04.67
7	Diego Urreta (MEX)	2:05.36	6	2:05.08
8	Juan Rodela (MEX)	2:05.91	8	2:06.39
9	Nicholas Bovell (TRI)	2:06.83	9	2:05.22 NR
10	Bradley Ally (BAR)	2:08.70	11	2:06.23
11	Tobias Oriwol (CAN)	2:08.46	10	2:08.10
12	Andrew MacKay (CAY)	2:11.52	14	2:08.88
13	Carlos Canépa (PER)	2:09.39	12	2:10.17
14	Carlos Prudencio (BOL)	2:12.34	15	2:12.18
15	Kieran Locke (ISV)	2:12.85	17	2:12.21
16	Chris Backhaus (DOM)	2:14.27	18	2:13.47
17	Guillermo Cabrera (DOM)	2:11.21	13	DNS
18	Neisser Bent (CUB)	2:12.26	16	DNS
