= Swimming at the 2003 Pan American Games – Men's 200 metre freestyle =

The Men's 200m Freestyle event at the 2003 Pan American Games took place on August 11, 2003 (Day 11 of the Games).

== Medalists ==
Gold	George Bovell; Trinidad and Tobago
Silver	Dan Ketchum; United States
Bronze	Rodrigo Castro; Brazil

== Records ==
Record	Athlete	Time	Date	Venue
World Record	Ian Thorpe (AUS)	1:44.06	2001-07-25	Fukuoka, Japan
Pan Am Record	Gustavo Borges (BRA)	1:48.49	1995-03-12	Mar del Plata, Argentina

== Results ==
Place	Swimmer	Heats		Final
Place	Swimmer	Time	Rank	Time
1	George Bovell (TRI)	1:51.00	2	1:48.90 NR
2	Dan Ketchum (USA)	1:51.09	3	1:49.34
3	Rodrigo Castro (BRA)	1:50.68	1	1:49.55
4	Jeff Lee (USA)	1:51.95	4	1:50.76
5	Colin Russell (CAN)	1:52.10	5	1:51.39
6	Giancarlo Zolezzi (CHI)	1:52.93	7	1:52.47
7	Rafael Mósca (BRA)	1:52.97	8	1:52.60
8	Brian Edey (CAN)	1:52.54	6	1:53.35
9	Damian Alleyne (BAR)	1:53.19	9	1:53.22
10	Max Schnettler (CHI)	1:55.50	13	1:54.19
11	Nicholas Bovell (TRI)	1:55.65	16	1:54.25
12	Alejandro Siqueiros (MEX)	1:53.81	10	1:54.27
13	Javier Díaz (MEX)	1:55.34	11	1:54.96
14	Juan Pablo Valdivieso (PER)	1:55.54	14	1:55.30
15	Paul Kutscher (URU)	1:55.60	15	1:56.05
16	Carlos Cánepa (PER)	1:56.62	18	1:56.95
17	Ronald Cowen (BER)	1:55.48 NR	12	
18	Bradley Ally (BAR)	1:56.41	18	
19	Shaune Fraser (CAY)	1:56.74	19	
20	Antonio Hernández (CUB)	1:57.77	20	
21	Chris Backhaus (DOM)	1:58.07	21	
22	Jorge Rodríguez (DOM)	1:58.35	22	
23	Vincent van Rutten (AHO)	1:58.84	23	
24	William Muriel (ECU)	1:58.87	24	
25	Carlos Meléndez (ESA)	1:59.41	25	
26	Kieran Locke (ISV)	1:59.49	26	
