= Swimming at the 2003 Pan American Games – Men's 200 metre individual medley =

The Men's 200m Individual Medley event at the 2003 Pan American Games took place on August 17, 2003 (Day 16 of the Games).

== Medalists ==
Gold	George Bovell; Trinidad and Tobago
Silver	Thiago Pereira; Brazil
Bronze	Eric Donnelly; United States

== Records ==
Record	Athlete	Time	Date	Venue
World Record	Michael Phelps (USA)	1:55.94	2003-08-09	(United States) College Park, Maryland
Pan Am Record	Ron Karnaugh (USA)	2:00.92	1991-08-18	Havana, Cuba

== Results ==
Place	Swimmer	Heats		Final
Place	Swimmer	Time	Rank	Time
1	George Bovell (TRI)	2:03.88	1	1:59.49 GR
2	Thiago Pereira (BRA)	2:05.26	6	2:02.31 SA
3	Eric Donnelly (USA)	2:04.48	3	2:02.52
4	James Galloway (USA)	2:04.75	5	2:02.74
5	Tobias Oriwol (CAN)	2:05.89	7	2:03.07
6	Diogo Yabe (BRA)	2:04.43	2	2:03.81
7	Jeremy Knowles (BAH)	2:04.72	4	2:03.99
8	Diego Urreta (MEX)	2:06.21	8	2:06.32
9	Bradley Ally (BAR)	2:06.40	9	2:05.09
10	Chad Murray (CAN)	2:06.87	10	2:05.64
11	Nicholas Bovell (TRI)	2:07.74	11	2:06.42
12	Andrew MacKay (CAY)	2:08.15	12	2:08.33
13	Francisco Picasso (URU)	2:09.81	14	2:08.94
14	Javier Díaz (MEX)	2:08.77	13	2:09.82
15	Shaune Fraser (CAY)	2:09.91	15	2:09.83
16	Carlos Meléndez (ESA)	2:12.41	16	2:13.03
17	Marcos Burgos (CHI)	2:12.54	17	
18	Vincent van Rutten (AHO)	2:13.61	18	
19	Hiram Carrion (PUR)	2:13.64	19	
20	Kieran Locke (ISV)	2:14.31	20	
21	Gordon Touw Ngie Tjouw (SUR)	2:16.62	21	
22	Roy Barahona (HON)	2:18.98	22	
