= Swimming at the 2003 Pan American Games – Women's 200 metre backstroke =

The Women's 200m Backstroke event at the 2003 Pan American Games took place on August 17, 2003 (Day 16 of the Games).

== Medalists ==
Gold	Jamie Reid; United States
Silver	Diana MacManus; United States
Bronze	Gisela Morales; Guatemala

== Records ==
World Record	Krisztina Egerszegi (HUN)	2:06.62	1991-08-25	Athens, Greece
Pan Am Record	Denali Knapp (USA)	2:12.48	1999-08-07	Winnipeg, Canada

== Results ==
Place	Swimmer	Heats		Final
Place	Swimmer	Time	Rank	Time
1	Jamie Reid (USA)	2:16.53	1	2:13.89
2	Diana MacManus (USA)	2:18.80	2	2:15.39
3	Gisela Morales (GUA)	2:20.70	3	2:16.19
4	Joanne Malar (CAN)	2:21.01	4	2:17.46
5	Georgina Bardach (ARG)	2:21.58	5	2:21.70
6	Gretchen Gotay (PUR)	2:26.58	7	2:24.07
7	Valeria Silva (PER)	2:24.03	6	2:24.40
8	Diana Caceres (ECU)	2:27.19	8	2:25.90
9	Talita Ribeiro (BRA)	2:27.88	9	2:26.17
10	Laura Rodríguez (DOM)	2:29.92	10	2:27.57
11	Fatima Valderrama (PER)	2:32.17	11	2:29.28
12	Alana Dilette (BAH)	2:34.44	12	2:33.19
13	María Costanzo (PAR)	2:38.22	13	DNS
