= Swimming at the 2003 Pan American Games – Men's 100 metre backstroke =

The Men's 100m Backstroke event at the 2003 Pan American Games took place on August 16, 2003 (day 15 of the Games).

== Medalists ==
Gold	Peter Marshall; United States
Silver	George Bovell; Trinidad and Tobago
Bronze	Jayme Cramer; United States

== Records ==
Record	Athlete	Time	Date	Venue
World Record	Lenny Krayzelburg (USA)	53.60	1999-08-24	Sydney, Australia
Pan Am Record	Jeff Rouse (USA)	54.74	1995-03-16	Mar del Plata, Argentina

== Results ==
Place	Swimmer	Heats		Final
Place	Swimmer	Time	Rank	Time
1	Peter Marshall (USA)	55.96	1	55.52
2	George Bovell (TRI)	57.41	7	55.81
3	Jayme Cramer (USA)	56.07	2	55.88
4	Sean Sepulis (CAN)	56.53	3	56.35
5	Eduardo Otero (ARG)	56.82	4	56.36
6	Neisser Bent (CUB)	57.23	6	56.68
7	Paulo Machado (BRA)	57.05	5	57.21
8	George Gleason (ISV)	57.58	8	57.73
9	Rogério Romero (BRA)	57.58	8	57.30
10	Nick Neckles (BAR)	57.69	10	57.90
11	Juan Rodela (MEX)	58.12	11	58.35
12	Nicolas Bovell (TRI)	58.69	14	58.85
13	Christophe Vythoulkas (BAH)	59.45	16	59.09
14	Diego Urreta (MEX)	58.62	12	59.11
15	Andrew MacKay (CAY)	59.05	15	59.40
16	Tobias Oriwol (CAN)	58.68	13	59.77
17	Carlos Prudencio (BOL)	1:00.69	17	
18	Guillermo Cabrera (DOM)	1:00.96	18	
19	Chris Backhaus (DOM)	1:01.36	19	
