= Swimming at the 2003 Pan American Games – Men's 400 metre individual medley =

The Men's 400m Individual Medley event at the 2003 Pan American Games took place on August 13, 2003 (Day 12 of the Games).

== Medalists ==
Gold	Robert Margalis; United States
Silver	Eric Donnelly; United States
Bronze	Thiago Pereira; Brazil

== Records ==
Record	Athlete	Time	Date	Venue
World Record	Michael Phelps (USA)	4:09.09	2003-07-27	Barcelona, Spain
Pan Am Record	Curtis Myden (CAN)	4:15.52	1999-08-03	Winnipeg, Canada

== Results ==
Place	Swimmer	Heats		Final
Place	Swimmer	Time	Rank	Time
1	Robert Margalis (USA)	4:24.00	2	4:19.09
2	Eric Donnelly (USA)	4:23.52	1	4:19.65
3	Thiago Pereira (BRA)	4:29.12	5	4:19.89
4	Jeremy Knowles (BAH)	4:27.05	3	4:22.04 NR
5	Bradley Ally (BAR)	4:30.02	6	4:24.42
6	Diogo Yabe (BRA)	4:29.02	4	4:25.85
7	Tobias Oriwol (CAN)	4:30.38	7	4:29.37
8	Andrew Mackay (CAY)	4:32.96	8	4:33.62
9	Chad Murray (CAN)	4:33.31	9	4:30.73
10	Shaune Fraser (CAY)	4:41.81	11	4:34.72
11	Marcos Burgos (CHI)	4:37.08	10	4:38.47
12	Hiram Carrion (PUR)	4:43.73	12	4:38.66
13	Vincent van Rutten (AHO)	4:46.58	13	4:43.42
14	Jonathan Mauri (CRC)	4:47.40	14	4:47.91
—	Kieran Locke (ISV)	4:53.23	15	scratched
