= Swimming at the 2003 Pan American Games – Men's 200 metre breaststroke =

The Men's 200m Breaststroke event at the 2003 Pan American Games took place on August 15, 2003 (day 15 of the Games). USA's Kyle Salyards won the race in 2:13.37, another Games record, with four swimmers contesting the remaining podium spots. Sean Quinn (USA) took the silver in 2:15.77 and Marcelo Tomazini (BRA) the bronze in 2:15.87. Only 1/100 behind Thiago Pereira (BRA) in fourth and Scott Dickens (CAN) in fifth in 2:15.94.

== Medalists ==
Gold	Kyle Salyards; United States
Silver	Sean Quinn; United States
Bronze	Marcelo Tomazini; Brazil

== Records ==
World Record	Kosuke Kitajima (JPN)	2:09.42	2003-07-24	Barcelona, Spain
Pan Am Record	Morgan Knabe (CAN)	2:14.73	1999-08-05	Winnipeg, Canada

== Results ==
Place	Swimmer	Heats		Final
Place	Swimmer	Time	Rank	Time
1	Kyle Salyards (USA)	2:16.76	1	2:13.37 GR
2	Sean Quinn (USA)	2:20.46	7	2:15.77
3	Marcelo Tomazini (BRA)	2:19.91	5	2:15.87 SA
4	Thiago Pereira (BRA)	2:20.07	6	2:15.88
5	Scott Dickens (CAN)	2:17.68	3	2:15.94
6	Matt Mains (CAN)	2:16.83	2	2:16.46
7	Juan Vargas (CUB)	2:19.80	4	2:19.16
8	Alfredo Jacobo (MEX)	2:20.82	8	2:21.13
9	Bradley Ally (BAR)	2:22.38	10	2:21.60
10	Francisco Suriano (ESA)	2:22.18	9	2:22.64
11	Alvaro Fortuny (GUA)	2:22.52	11	2:23.22
12	Hiram Carrion (PUR)	2:26.39	16	2:24.54
13	José Romagoza (ESA)	2:26.28	15	2:24.77
14	Cristián Soldano (ARG)	2:23.77	12	2:25.58
15	Guillermo Henriquez (DOM)	2:25.47	13	2:25.74
16	Marcos Burgos (CHI)	2:25.81	14	2:26.08
17	Travano McPhee (BAH)	2:27.84	17	
18	Kevin Hensley (ISV)	2:30.80	18	
19	Alfonso Espinosa (DOM)	2:33.63	19	
