= Swimming at the 2003 Pan American Games – Men's 1500 metre freestyle =

The Men's 1500m Freestyle event at the 2003 Pan American Games took place on August 17, 2003 (Day 16 of the Games).

Ricardo Monasterio won the gold medal, breaking a string of 12 U.S. titles in a row. Before him, only other non-American had won the race, the Brazilian Tetsuo Okamoto, in the first edition of the Games in 1951.

== Medalists ==
Gold	Ricardo Monasterio; Venezuela
Silver	Fran Crippen; United States
Bronze	Chris Thompson; United States

== Records ==
Record	Athlete	Time	Date	Venue
World Record	Grant Hackett (AUS)	14:34.56	2001-07-29	Fukuoka, Japan
Pan Am Record	Carlton Bruner (USA)	15:13.90	1995-03-17	Mar del Plata, Argentina

== Results ==
Place	Swimmer	Time
1	Ricardo Monasterio (VEN)	15:16.98
2	Fran Crippen (USA)	15:19.63
3	Chris Thompson (USA)	15:19.64
4	Luiz Lima (BRA)	15:41.41
5	Andres Jiménez (MEX)	15:52.40
6	Bruno Bonfim (BRA)	15:54.84
7	Leonardo Salinas (MEX)	16:00.99
8	Giancarlo Zolezzi (CHI)	16:05.59
