= Swimming at the 2003 Pan American Games – Women's 100 metre breaststroke =

The Women's 100m Breaststroke event at the 2003 Pan American Games took place on August 15, 2003 (Day 15 of the Games).

== Medalists ==
Gold	Staciana Stitts; United States
Silver	Corrie Clark; United States
Bronze	Kathleen Stoody; Canada

== Records ==
World Record	Leisel Jones (AUS)	1:06.37	2003-07-21	Barcelona, Spain
Pan Am Record	Staciana Stitts (USA)	1:09.16	1999-08-05	Winnipeg, Canada

== Results ==
Place	Swimmer	Heats		Final
Place	Swimmer	Time	Rank	Time
1	Staciana Stitts (USA)	1:09.32	1	1:09.01
2	Corrie Clark (USA)	1:10.17	2	1:10.09
3	Kathleen Stoody (CAN)	1:11.25	4	1:10.56
4	Lisa Blackburn (CAN)	1:10.92	3	1:11.54
5	Adriana Marmolejo (MEX)	1:14.66	7	1:13.18
6	Agustina de Giovanni (ARG)	1:13.90	6	1:13.30
7	Imaday Núñez (CUB)	1:13.25	5	1:14.02
8	Patrícia Comini (BRA)	1:14.75	8	1:14.32
9	Alia Atkinson (JAM)	1:14.81	9	1:15.37
10	Valeria Silva (PER)	1:15.95	10	1:16.05
11	Margoth Escalante (ESA)	1:18.66	14	1:17.68
12	Shannon Duval (TRI)	1:17.13	12	1:17.76
13	Maria Zenoni (DOM)	1:17.68	13	1:18.65
14	Katerine Moreno (BOL)	1:17.00	11	1:18.79
15	Maria Franco (PAR)	1:18.77	15	1:19.88
16	Nilshaira Isenia (AHO)	1:19.32	16	1:22.67
17	Jamie Shufflebarger (ISV)	1:19.77	17	
18	April Knowles (BAH)	1:20.90	18	
19	Linda McEachrane (TRI)	1:21.26	19	
