= Swimming at the 2003 Pan American Games – Men's 100 metre breaststroke =

The Men's 100m Breaststroke event at the 2003 Pan American Games took place on August 12, 2003 (Day 11 of the Games).

== Medalists ==
Gold	Mark Gangloff; United States
Silver	Jarrod Marrs; United States
Bronze	Eduardo Fischer; Brazil

== Records ==
Record	Athlete	Time	Date	Venue
World Record	Kosuke Kitajima (JPN)	59.78	2003-07-21	Barcelona, Spain
Pan Am Record	Ed Moses (USA)	1:00.99	1999-08-02	Winnipeg, Canada

== Results ==
Place	Swimmer	Heats		Final
Place	Swimmer	Time	Rank	Time
1	Mark Gangloff (USA)	1:02.04	1	1:00.95
2	Jarrod Marrs (USA)	1:02.15	2	1:01.71
3	Eduardo Fischer (BRA)	1:02.77	3	1:01.88 SA
4	Scott Dickens (CAN)	1:03.03	5	1:02.13
5	Henrique Barbosa (BRA)	1:02.98	4	1:02.81
6	Alfredo Jacobo (MEX)	1:03.92	7	1:03.44
7	Juan Vargas (CUB)	1:03.83	6	1:03.55
8	Matthew Mains (CAN)	1:03.96	8	1:03.65
9	Bradley Ally (BAR)	1:45.27	20	1:03.82
10	Arsenio López (PUR)	1:05.38	10	1:04.01
11	Alvaro Fortuny (GUA)	1:05.69	12	1:05.43
12	Francisco Suriano (ESA)	1:05.12	9	1:05.47
13	Hiram Carrion (PUR)	1:06.54	13	1:05.63
14	Cristián Soldano (ARG)	1:05.39	11	1:05.65
15	Sergio Meléndez (ESA)	1:07.02	14	1:06.66
16	Alfonso Espinosa (DOM)	1:07.44	15	1:07.34
17	Travano McPhee (BAH)	1:07.64	16	
18	Antonio León (PAR)	1:09.28	17	
19	Guillermo Henriquez (DOM)	1:10.29	18	
20	Onan Thom (GUY)	1:10.78	19	
