= Swimming at the 2003 Pan American Games – Women's 200 metre individual medley =

The Women's 200m Individual Medley event at the 2003 Pan American Games took place on August 16, 2003 (Day 15 of the Games).

== Medalists ==
Gold	Joanne Malar-Morreale; Canada
Silver	Corrie Clark; United States
Bronze	Laura Davis; United States

== Records ==
World Record	Wu Yanyan (CHN)	2:09.72	1997-10-17	Shanghai, China
Pan Am Record	Joanne Malar (CAN)	2:14.18	1999-08-06	Winnipeg, Canada

== Results ==
Place	Swimmer	Heats		Final
Place	Swimmer	Time	Rank	Time
1	Joanne Malar-Morreale (CAN)	2:19.07	3	2:15.93
2	Corrie Clark (USA)	2:18.82	2	2:16.78
3	Laura Davis (USA)	2:19.54	4	2:17.33
4	Joanna Maranhão (BRA)	2:22.82	5	2:17.75
5	Kelly Doody (CAN)	2:18.48	1	2:18.11
6	Georgina Bardach (ARG)	2:22.97	6	2:19.07
7	Sonia Álvarez (PUR)	2:23.52	7	2:22.98
8	Vanessa Duenas (COL)	2:24.71	8	2:23.12
9	Alia Atkinson (JAM)	2:27.60	11	2:26.67
10	Maria Wong (PER)	2:27.52	10	2:28.18
11	Vanessa Martínez (PUR)	2:29.27	12	2:28.84
12	Raina Paulson-Andrews (JAM)	2:30.29	15	2:29.10
13	Alana Dillette (BAH)	2:32.43	18	2:30.18
14	Maria Zenoni (DOM)	2:29.58	13	2:31.07
15	Priscila Zacarias (DOM)	2:31.32	16	2:31.37
16	Jamie Shufflebarger (ISV)	2:32.41	17	2:31.85
—	Imaday Núñez (CUB)	2:25.92	9	scratched
—	Valeria Silva (PER)	2:29.90	14	scratched
17	Katerine Moreno (BOL)	2:32.83	scratched	
