= Swimming at the 2003 Pan American Games – Women's 400 metre freestyle =

The Women's 400m Freestyle event at the 2003 Pan American Games took place on August 14, 2003 (Day 13 of the Games).

== Medalists ==
Gold	Elizabeth Hill; United States
Silver	Morgan Hentzen; United States
Bronze	Monique Ferreira; Brazil

== Records ==
Record	Athlete	Time	Date	Venue
World Record	Janet Evans (USA)	4:03.85	1988-09-22	Seoul, South Korea
Pan Am Record	Cynthia Woodhead (USA)	4:10.60	1979-07-01	San Juan, Puerto Rico

== Results ==
Place	Swimmer	Heats		Final
Place	Swimmer	Time	Rank	Time
1	Elizabeth Hill (USA)	4:16.26	1	4:10.18 GR
2	Morgan Hentzen (USA)	4:16.93	2	4:13.03
3	Monique Ferreira (BRA)	4:19.72	5	4:14.21
4	Julie Gravelle (CAN)	4:18.30	3	4:14.85
5	Janelle Atkinson (JAM)	4:19.39	4	4:15.99
6	Mariana Brochado (BRA)	4:21.04	7	4:17.73
7	Kristel Köbrich (CHI)	4:19.83	6	4:18.24
8	Alejandra Galan (MEX)	4:24.41	9	4:23.37
9	Maya Beaudry (CAN)	4:24.45	10	4:21.57
10	Sonia Álvarez (PUR)	4:24.25	8	4:22.79
11	Tania Galindo (MEX)	4:28.32	11	4:26.79
12	Kaitlyn Elphinstone (CAY)	4:30.25	12	4:28.73
13	Heather Roffey (CAY)	4:31.35	13	4:29.57
14	Solimar Mojica (PUR)	4:37.42	14	4:34.60
15	Maria Wong (PER)	4:39.56	15	4:36.52
16	Karina Clavo (PER)	4:42.48	16	7:19.53
