= Swimming at the 2003 Pan American Games – Women's 800 metre freestyle =

The Women's 800m Freestyle event at the 2003 Pan American Games took place on August 16, 2003 (Day 15 of the Games).

At this race, Kristel Köbrich won the first medal of her country in swimming at Pan American Games at all times.

== Medalists ==
Gold	Morgan Hentzen; United States
Silver	Rachel Burke; United States
Bronze	Kristel Köbrich; Chile

== Records ==
Record	Athlete	Time	Date	Venue
World Record	Janet Evans (USA)	8:16.22	1989-08-20	Tokyo, Japan
Pan Am Record	Kaitlin Sandeno (USA)	8:34.65	1999-08-06	Winnipeg, Canada

== Results ==
Place	Swimmer	Time
1	Morgan Hentzen (USA)	8:36.54
2	Rachel Burke (USA)	8:37.61
3	Kristel Köbrich (CHI)	8:43.90
4	Julie Gravelle (CAN)	8:45.82
5	Nayara Ribeiro (BRA)	8:53.64
6	Ana Muniz (BRA)	9:00.42
7	Maya Beaudry (CAN)	9:01.61
8	Sonia Álvarez (PUR)	9:03.48
9	Tania Galindo (MEX)	9:13.51
10	Kaitlyn Elphinstone (CAY)	9:25.06
11	Karina Clavo (PER)	9:31.88
