= 2005–06 FINA Swimming World Cup =

The 2005–06 FINA Swimming World Cup was series of eight international short course swimming meets organized by FINA which took place from November 2005 through February 2006. The overall winners for the series were Ryk Neethling of South Africa (male) and Therese Alshammar of Sweden (female).

== Meets ==
Year	Dates	Pool	City	Country	Zone	Results
2 0 0 5	11–13 November	Kings Park Aquatic Complex	Durban	South Africa	Asia/Oceania/Africa	
2 0 0 5	19+20 November	Sydney International Aquatic Centre	Sydney	Australia	Asia/Oceania/Africa	Results
2 0 0 5	24+25 November	?	Daejon	South Korea	Asia/Oceania/Africa	
2 0 0 6	17+18 January	Eriksdalsbadet	Stockholm	Sweden	Europe	Results
2 0 0 6	21+22 January	Europasportpark	Berlin	Germany	Europe	Results
2 0 0 6	25+26 January	Olympiiski Swimming Pool	Moscow	Russia	Europe	Results
2 0 0 6	3+4 February	Nassau County Aquatic Center	New York (East Meadow)	United States	Americas	Results
2 0 0 6	10–12 February	Minas Tênis Clube	Belo Horizonte	Brazil	Americas	Results

== Event winners ==
- WR denotes World Record
- WC denotes World Cup Record

=== 50 m freestyle ===
Men		Meet	Women	
Winner (Nationality)	Time	Meet	Winner (Nationality)	Time
Ryk Neethling (South Africa)	21.56	#1: Durban	Marleen Veldhuis (Netherlands)	24.07
Ryk Neethling (South Africa)	21.69	#2: Sydney	Lisbeth Lenton (Australia)	23.85 WC
(United States) Jason Lezak (USA)	21.62	#3: Daejon	Marleen Veldhuis (Netherlands)	24.61
(United States) Jason Lezak (USA)	21.61	#4: Stockholm	Therese Alshammar (Sweden)	24.47
(United States) Nick Brunelli (USA)	21.63	#5: Berlin	Marleen Veldhuis (Netherlands)	24.32
(United States) Jason Lezak (USA)	21.73	#6: Moscow	Aleksandra Gerasimenya (Belarus)	24.74
Frédérick Bousquet (France)	21.61	#7: New York	Therese Alshammar (Sweden)	24.32
Nicholas Santos (Brazil)	21.81	#8: Belo Horizonte	Rebeca Gusmão (Brazil)	24.71

=== 100 m freestyle ===
Men		Meet	Women	
Winner (Nationality)	Time	Meet	Winner (Nationality)	Time
Ryk Neethling (South Africa)	47.63	#1: Durban	Marleen Veldhuis (Netherlands)	53.13
Ryk Neethling (South Africa)	47.04	#2: Sydney	Lisbeth Lenton (Australia)	52.17
(United States) Jason Lezak (USA)	47.36	#3: Daejon	Marleen Veldhuis (Netherlands)	53.24
Ryk Neethling (South Africa)	47.68	#4: Stockholm	Marleen Veldhuis (Netherlands)	53.28
Alain Bernard (France)	47.90	#5: Berlin	Marleen Veldhuis (Netherlands)	53.20
(United States) Jason Lezak (USA)	47.66	#6: Moscow	Malia Metella (France)	54.57
(United States) Neil Walker (USA)	47.50	#7: New York	Marleen Veldhuis (Netherlands)	53.59
Brent Hayden (Canada)	48.08	#8: Belo Horizonte	Rebeca Gusmão (Brazil)	54.08

=== 200 m freestyle ===
Men		Meet	Women	
Winner (Nationality)	Time	Meet	Winner (Nationality)	Time
Ryk Neethling (South Africa)	1:44.74	#1: Durban	Marleen Veldhuis (Netherlands)	1:56.38
Ryk Neethling (South Africa)	1:43.97	#2: Sydney	Lisbeth Lenton (Australia)	1:53.29
Ryk Neethling (South Africa)	1:45.50	#3: Daejon	Marleen Veldhuis (Netherlands)	1:56.46
Ryk Neethling (South Africa)	1:45.00	#4: Stockholm	Melanie Marshall (United Kingdom)	1:55.43
Paweł Korzeniowski (Poland)	1:45.10	#5: Berlin	Melanie Marshall (United Kingdom)	1:54.53
Paweł Korzeniowski (Poland)	1:46.24	#6: Moscow	(United States) Rachel Komisarz (USA)	1:56.73
(United States) Michael Phelps (USA)	1:42.78	#7: New York	Josefin Lillhage (Sweden)	1:56.73
Brent Hayden (Canada)	1:44.85	#8: Belo Horizonte	Camelia Potec (Romania)	1:58.34

=== 400 m freestyle ===
Men		Meet	Women	
Winner (Nationality)	Time	Meet	Winner (Nationality)	Time
Park Tae-Hwan (South Korea)	3:42.78	#1: Durban	Camelia Potec (Romania)	4:05.32
Park Tae-Hwan (South Korea)	3:43.25	#2: Sydney	Bronte Barratt (Australia)	4:04.03
Cameron Smith (Australia)	3:52.26	#3: Daejon	Ashleigh McCleery (Australia)	4:08.57
Zhang Lin (China)	3:41.58	#4: Stockholm	(United States) Rachel Komisarz (USA)	4:04.23
Paul Biedermann (Germany)	3:41.94	#5: Berlin	Ai Shibata (Japan)	4:02.92
Yuri Prilukov (Russia)	3:44.33	#6: Moscow	Alena Popchanka (France)	4:05.19
Massimiliano Rosolino (Italy)	3:39.55	#7: New York	(United States) Kate Ziegler (USA)	4:03.19
Dragoş Coman (Romania)	3:49.25	#8: Belo Horizonte	Camelia Potec (Romania)	4:07.52

=== 1500m (men)/800m (women) freestyle ===
Men		Meet	Women	
Winner (Nationality)	Time	Meet	Winner (Nationality)	Time
Dragoş Coman (Romania)	14:41.41	#1: Durban	Camelia Potec (Romania)	8:30.11
Park Tae-Hwan (South Korea)	14:44.87	#2: Sydney	Sarah Paton (Australia)	8:26.60
Yu Jeong-Nam (South Korea)	15:04.48	#3: Daejon	Kylie Palmer {Australia)	8:31.92
Dragoş Coman (Romania)	14:38.00 NR	#4: Stockholm	Ai Shibata (Japan)	8:22.38
Zhang Lin (China)	14:36.12	#5: Berlin	Ai Shibata (Japan)	8:18.76
Yury Prilukov (Russia)	14:44.12	#6: Moscow	Anastasya Ivanenko (Russia)	8:18.82
(United States) Robert Margalis (USA)	14:56.94	#7: New York	(United States) Kate Ziegler (USA)	8:12.19 WC
Dragoş Coman {Romania)	15:13.40	#8: Belo Horizonte	Camelia Potec (Romania)	8:38.37

=== 50 m backstroke ===
Men		Meet	Women	
Winner (Nationality)	Time	Meet	Winner (Nationality)	Time
Arkady Vyatchanin (Russia)	24.60	#1: Durban	Xianmin Hou (China)	28.57
(United States) Peter Marshall (USA)	23.68	#2: Sydney	Tayliah Zimmer (Australia)	27.47
(United States) Randall Bal (USA)	24.33	#3: Daejon	Min Ji Shim (South Korea)	28.71
(United States) Peter Marshall (USA)	23.66	#4: Stockholm	Louise Ørnstedt (Denmark)	28.06
Thomas Rupprath (Germany)	23.59	#5: Berlin	Janine Pietsch (Germany)	27.20
(United States) Randall Bal (USA)	23.95	#6: Moscow	Aleksandra Gerasimenya (Belarus)	27.61
(United States) Peter Marshall (USA)	23.39 =WC	#7: New York	(United States) Caitlin Andrew (USA)	27.84
Thomas Rupprath (Germany)	24.17	#8: Belo Horizonte	Janine Pietsch (Germany)	27.25

=== 100 m backstroke ===
Men		Meet	Women	
Winner (Nationality)	Time	Meet	Winner (Nationality)	Time
Arkady Vyatchanin (Russia)	52.53	#1: Durban	Xianmin Hou (China)	1:00.54
(United States) Peter Marshall (USA)	51.37	#2: Sydney	(United States) Natalie Coughlin (USA)	57.56
(United States) Randall Bal (USA)	51.72	#3: Daejon	Min Ji Shim (South Korea)	1:02.08
(United States) Peter Marshall (USA)	51.07	#4: Stockholm	Hanae Ito (Japan)	1:00.03
(United States) Randall Bal (USA)	51.41	#5: Berlin	Kateryna Zubkova (Ukraine)	58.76
(United States) Randall Bal (USA)	51.15	#6: Moscow	Kateryna Zubkova (Ukraine)	1:00.01
(United States) Randall Bal (USA)	50.92	#7: New York	(United States) Margaret Hoelzer (USA)	59.46
Thomas Rupprath (Germany)	52.30	#8: Belo Horizonte	Janine Pietsch (Germany)	1:00.14

=== 200 m backstroke ===
Men		Meet	Women	
Winner (Nationality)	Time	Meet	Winner (Nationality)	Time
Johannes Du Rand (South Africa)	1:53.92	#1: Durban	Katarzyna Staszak (Poland)	2:10.57
(United States) Randall Bal (USA)	1:52.59	#2: Sydney	(United States) Margaret Hoelzer (USA)	2:06.78
(United States) Randall Bal (USA)	1:53.58	#3: Daejon	Amy Lucas (Australia)	2:13.98
(United States) Randall Bal (USA	1:53.51	#4: Stockholm	Hanae Ito (Japan)	2:07.94
(United States) Randall Bal (USA)	1:52.53	#5: Berlin	Hanae Ito (Japan)	2:05.67
Arkady Vyatchanin (Russia)	1:53.01	#6: Moscow	Kateryna Zubkova (Ukraine)	2:08.03
(United States) Randall Bal (USA)	1:50.95	#7: New York	(United States) Margaret Hoelzer (USA)	2:05.98
Arkady Vyatchanin (Russia)	1:53.08	#8: Belo Horizonte	Carin Möller (Sweden)	2:09.66

=== 50 m breaststroke ===
Men		Meet	Women	
Winner (Nationality)	Time	Meet	Winner (Nationality)	Time
Mark Warnecke (Germany)	27.27	#1: Durban	Jade Edmistone (Australia)	30.36
Brenton Rickard (Australia)	27.34	#2: Sydney	Jade Edmistone (Australia)	30.13 WC
Brenton Rickard (Australia)	27.47	#3: Daejon	Lei Yan (China)	32.16
Oleg Lisogor (Ukraine)	26.84	#4: Stockholm	(United States) Tara Kirk (USA)	30.37
Oleg Lisogor (Ukraine)	26.17 WR	#5: Berlin	(United States) Tara Kirk (USA)	30.52
Oleg Lisogor (Ukraine)	26.75	#6: Moscow	(United States) Tara Kirk (USA)	30.79
Oleg Lisogor (Ukraine)	27.00	#7: New York	(United States) Tara Kirk (USA)	30.58
Eduardo Fischer (Brazil)	27.59	#8: Belo Horizonte	(United States) Staciana Winfield (USA)	31.17

=== 100 m breaststroke ===
Men		Meet	Women	
Winner (Nationality)	Time	Meet	Winner (Nationality)	Time
Oleg Lisogor (Ukraine)	59.17	#1: Durban	Jade Edmistone (Australia)	1:05.93
Christian Sprenger (Australia)	59.58	#2: Sydney	Leisel Jones (Australia)	1:04.84 WC
Brenton Rickard (Australia)	59.70	#3: Daejon	Megumi Taneda (Japan)	1:08.80
Hugues Duboscq (France)	59.05	#4: Stockholm	(United States) Tara Kirk (USA)	1:05.53
Oleg Lisogor (Ukraine)	57.67	#5: Berlin	(United States) Tara Kirk (USA)	1:05.63
Oleg Lisogor (Ukraine)	58.26	#6: Moscow	(United States) Tara Kirk (USA)	1:06.20
Oleg Lisogor (Ukraine)	58.49	#7: New York	(United States) Tara Kirk (USA)	1:05.29
Henrique Barbosa (Brazil)	59.82	#8: Belo Horizonte	(United States) Staciana Winfield (USA)	1:07.22

=== 200 m breaststroke ===
Men		Meet	Women	
Winner (Nationality)	Time	Meet	Winner (Nationality)	Time
Sławomir Kuczko (Poland)	2:09.25	#1: Durban	Suzaan van Biljon (South Africa)	2:21.96
Jim Piper (Australia)	2:07.78	#2: Sydney	(Australia) Leisel Jones (USA)	2:21.93
Kyosuke Yonehara (Japan)	2:08.32	#3: Daejon	Megumi Taneda (Japan)	2:26.44
Kris Gilchrist (United Kingdom)	2:08.74	#4: Stockholm	Kirsty Balfour (United Kingdom)	2:22.73
Grigory Falko (Russia)	2:08.10	#5: Berlin	Nan Luo (China)	2:21.90
Grigory Falko (Russia)	2:07.36	#6: Moscow	(United States) Tara Kirk (USA)	2:22.91
(United States) Brendan Hansen (USA)	2:08.35	#7: New York	(United States) Tara Kirk (USA)	2:20.84
Scott Dickens (Canada)	2:12.17	#8: Belo Horizonte	(United States) Staciana Winfield (USA)	2:26.96

=== 50 m butterfly ===
Men		Meet	Women	
Winner (Nationality)	Time	Meet	Winner (Nationality)	Time
Ryk Neethling (South Africa)	23.33	#1: Durban	Anna-Karin Kammerling (Sweden)	26.37
Kaio Almeida (Brazil)	22.92	#2: Sydney	Alice Mills (Australia)	26.21
Kaio Almeida (Brazil)	23.10	#3: Daejon	Marleen Veldhuis (Netherlands)	26.72
Kaio Almeida (Brazil)	23.01	#4: Stockholm	Therese Alshammar (Sweden)	25.84
Sergiy Breus (Ukraine)	23.30	#5: Berlin	Anna-Karin Kammerling (Sweden)	25.85
Sergiy Breus (Ukraine)	23.11	#6: Moscow	Alena Popchanka (France)	26.57
Kohei Kawamoto (Japan)	23.37	#7: New York	Therese Alshammar (Sweden)	25.78
Kaio Almeida (Brazil)	23.30	#8: Belo Horizonte	Johanna Sjöberg (Sweden)	26.89

=== 100 m butterfly ===
Men		Meet	Women	
Winner (Nationality)	Time	Meet	Winner (Nationality)	Time
Ryk Neethling (South Africa)	51.11	#1: Durban	Martina Moravcová (Slovakia)	58.71
Kaio de Almeida (Brazil)	51.04	#2: Sydney	(United States) Natalie Coughlin (USA)	57.39
Kaio de Almeida (Brazil)	51.05	#3: Daejon	Junyao Wang (China)	58.92
Evgeny Korotyshkin (Russia)	51.66	#4: Stockholm	(United States) Rachel Komisarz (USA)	58.26
Evgeny Korotyshkin (Russia)	51.31	#5: Berlin	Mandy Loots (South Africa)	58.42
Evgeny Korotyshkin (Russia)	51.30	#6: Moscow	(United States) Rachel Komisarz (USA)	58.60
Andriy Serdinov (Ukraine)	52.28	#7: New York	(United States) Rachel Komisarz (USA)	58.33
Kaio de Almeida (Brazil)	51.75	#8: Belo Horizonte	Irina Bespalova (Russia)	59.09

=== 200 m butterfly ===
Men		Meet	Women	
Winner (Nationality)	Time	Meet	Winner (Nationality)	Time
Paweł Korzeniowski (Poland)	1:53.76	#1: Durban	Keri-Leigh Shaw (South Africa)	2:10.04
Kaio Almeida (Brazil)	1:53.87	#2: Sydney	Jessicah Schipper (Australia)	2:05.48
Kaio Almeida (Brazil)	1:53.38	#3: Daejon	Biying Deng (China)	2:08.44
Paweł Korzeniowski (Poland)	1:53.28	#4: Stockholm	Yuko Nakanishi (Japan)	2:07.21
Paweł Korzeniowski (Poland)	1:53.08	#5: Berlin	Yuko Nakanishi (Japan)	2:05.84
Paweł Korzeniowski (Poland)	1:53.24	#6: Moscow	(United States) Rachel Komisarz (USA)	2:09.24
Wu Peng (China)	1:54.24	#7: New York	Francesca Segat (Italy)	2:07.60
Anatoly Polyakov (Russia)	1:56.31	#8: Belo Horizonte	Keri-Leigh Shaw (South Africa)	2:11.51

=== 100 m individual medley ===
Men		Meet	Women	
Winner (Nationality)	Time	Meet	Winner (Nationality)	Time
Ryk Neethling (South Africa)	53:03	#1: Durban	Aleksandra Urbanczyk (Poland)	1:01.06
Ryk Neethling (South Africa)	51.81	#2: Sydney	(United States) Natalie Coughlin (USA)	1:00.60
Ryk Neethling (South Africa)	54.60	#3: Daejon	(United States) Tanica Jamison (USA)	1:02.33
Ryk Neethling (South Africa)	53.35	#4: Stockholm	Aleksandra Urbanczyk (Poland)	1:00.98
Thomas Rupprath (Germany)	53.52	#5: Berlin	Aleksandra Gerasimenya (Belarus)	1:00.30
Oleg Lisogor (Ukraine)	53.38	#6: Moscow	Aleksandra Gerasimenya (Belarus)	1:00.99
(United States) Michael Phelps (USA)	53.21	#7: New York	Svetlana Karpeeva (Russia)	1:02.08
Ryk Neethling (South Africa)	53.72	#8: Belo Horizonte	Svetlana Karpeeva (Russia)	1:01.61

=== 200 m individual medley ===
Men		Meet	Women	
Winner (Nationality)	Time	Meet	Winner (Nationality)	Time
Peter Mankoč (Slovenia)	1:59.60	#1: Durban	Katarzyna Baranowska (Poland)	2:10.96
Dean Kent (New Zealand)	1:56.84	#2: Sydney	Kirsty Coventry (Zimbabwe)	2:09.72
Lucas Salatta (Brazil)	1:58.94	#3: Daejon	Maiko Fujino (Japan)	2:11.22
Hidemasa Sano (Japan)	1:56.97	#4: Stockholm	Katarzyna Baranowska (Poland)	2:09.64
Hidemasa Sano (Japan)	1:56.22	#5: Berlin	Maiko Fujino (Japan)	2:09.54
Igor Berezutskiy (Russia)	1:56.43	#6: Moscow	Katarzyna Baranowska (Poland)	2:11.31
(United States) Michael Phelps (USA)	1:55.28	#7: New York	(United States) Ariana Kukors (USA)	2:09.84
Thiago Pereira (Brazil)	1:56.67	#8: Belo Horizonte	Nicole Hetzer (Germany)	2:13.88

=== 400 m individual medley ===
Men		Meet	Women	
Winner (Nationality)	Time	Meet	Winner (Nationality)	Time
Paweł Korzeniowski (Poland)	4:08.25	#1: Durban	Katarzyna Baranowska (Poland)	4:35.71
Dean Kent (New Zealand)	4:08.00	#2: Sydney	Lara Carroll (Australia)	4:34.08
Lucas Salatta (Brazil)	4:11.60	#3: Daejon	Maiko Fujino (Japan)	4:37.37
Hidemasa Sano (Japan)	4:06.98	#4: Stockholm	Maiko Fujino (Japan)	4:33.34
Hidemasa Sano (Japan)	4:06.85	#5: Berlin	Maiko Fujino (Japan)	4:32.98
Igor Berezutskiy (Russia)	4:05.83	#6: Moscow	Anastasya Ivanenko (Russia)	4:34.85
(United States) Michael Phelps (USA)	4:03.99 WC	#7: New York	(United States) Ariana Kukors (USA)	4:34.48
Thiago Pereira (Brazil)	4:18.69	#8: Belo Horizonte	Nicole Hetzer (Germany)	4:41.59
