= Swimming at the 2003 Pan American Games – Women's 200 metre freestyle =

The Women's 200m Freestyle event at the 2003 Pan American Games took place on August 13, 2003 (Day 12 of the Games).

== Medalists ==
| Gold | Dana Vollmer; United States |
| Silver | Colleen Lanné; United States |
| Bronze | Mariana Brochado; Brazil |

== Records ==
| Record | Athlete | Time | Date | Venue |
|---|---|---|---|---|
| World Record | Franziska van Almsick (GER) | 1:56.64 | 2002-08-03 | Berlin, Germany |
| Pan Am Record | Cynthia Woodhead (USA) | 1:58.43 | 1979-07-03 | San Juan, Puerto Rico |

== Results ==
| Place | Swimmer | Heats | | Final |
| Place | Swimmer | Time | Rank | Time |
|---|---|---|---|---|
| 1 | Dana Vollmer (USA) | 2:01.88 | 1 | 1:59.80 |
| 2 | Colleen Lanné (USA) | 2:03.45 | 2 | 2:01.98 |
| 3 | Mariana Brochado (BRA) | 2:04.97 | 7 | 2:02.08 |
| 4 | Elizabeth Collins (CAN) | 2:04.06 | 4 | 2:02.26 |
| 4 | Monique Ferreira (BRA) | 2:04.85 | 6 | 2:02.26 |
| 6 | Florencia Szigeti (ARG) | 2:04.21 | 5 | 2:03.23 |
| 7 | Janelle Atkinson (JAM) | 2:03.73 | 3 | 2:03.27 |
| 8 | Maya Beaudry (CAN) | 2:05.10 | 8 | 2:03.38 |
| 9 | Alejandra Galan (MEX) | 2:05.77 | 9 | 2:05.32 |
| 10 | Atenas López (MEX) | 2:07.13 | 11 | 2:06.62 |
| 11 | Angela Chuck (JAM) | 2:06.52 | 10 | 2:06.76 |
| 12 | Solimar Mojica (PUR) | 2:08.54 | 12 | 2:08.54 |
| 13 | Diana López (VEN) | 2:09.70 | 14 | 2:08.81 |
| 14 | Kaitlyn Elphinstone (CAY) | 2:10.23 | 15 | 2:08.90 NR |
| 15 | Vanessa Martínez (PUR) | 2:08.57 | 13 | 2:09.53 |
| 16 | Maria Wong (PER) | 2:11.29 | 16 | 2:11.00 |
| 17 | Arlene Semeco (VEN) | 2:12.22 | 17 | |
| 18 | Nikia Deveaux (BAH) | 2:13.63 | 18 | |
| 19 | Priscila Zacarias (DOM) | 2:13.81 | 19 | |
