= Chad Murray =

Chad Murray may refer to:

- Chad Michael Murray, American actor
- Chad Murray (swimmer), Canadian swimmer, see Swimming at the 2003 Pan American Games
