= 2003 Pan American Games medal table =

- Location: Santo Domingo, Dominican Republic

Highlights
- Most gold medals: United States (117)
- Most total medals: United States (270)

The 2003 Pan American Games, officially known as the XIV Pan American Games, were a continental multi-sport event held in Santo Domingo, Dominican Republic, from August 1 to August 17, 2003. At the Games, 5,500 athletes selected from 42 National Olympic Committees (NOCs) participated in events in 35 sports. Thirty-one nations earned medals during the competition, and sixteen won at least one gold medal.

== Medal table ==
The ranking in this table is based on medal counts published by several media organizations. By default, the table is ordered by the number of gold medals won by the athletes representing a nation. (In this context, a nation is an entity represented by a NOC). The number of silver medals is taken into consideration next and then the number of bronze medals. If nations are still tied, equal ranking is given and they are listed alphabetically by IOC country code.

To sort this table by nation, total medal count, or any other column, click on the icon next to the column title.

* Host nation (Dominican Republic)

Rank	Nation	Gold	Silver	Bronze	Total
1	United States	117	80	73	270
2	Cuba	72	41	39	152
3	Canada	29	57	42	128
4	Brazil	29	40	54	123
5	Mexico	20	27	32	79
6	Venezuela	16	21	27	64
7	Argentina	16	20	27	63
8	Colombia	11	8	23	42
9	Dominican Republic*	10	12	19	41
10	Jamaica	5	2	6	13
11	Puerto Rico	3	4	9	16
12	Ecuador	3	1	5	9
13	Chile	2	10	10	22
14	Trinidad and Tobago	2	4	1	7
15	Uruguay	2	1	5	8
16	Peru	1	1	8	10
17	Guatemala	0	3	9	12
18	El Salvador	0	2	2	4
19	Bahamas	0	2	0	2
20	Haiti	0	1	2	3
21	Grenada	0	1	1	2
21	Guyana	0	1	1	2
23	Bermuda	0	1	0	1
23	Cayman Islands	0	1	0	1
25	Bolivia	0	0	2	2
25	Panama	0	0	2	2
27	Barbados	0	0	1	1
27	Costa Rica	0	0	1	1
27	Honduras	0	0	1	1
27	Netherlands Antilles	0	0	1	1
27	Saint Lucia	0	0	1	1
Totals (31 entries)		338	341	404	1,083
