= 2002 Pan Pacific Swimming Championships – Women's 1500 metre freestyle =

Women's 1500 metre freestyle at the 2002 Pan Pacific Swimming Championships
- Venue: Yokohama International Swimming Pool
- Dates: August 24, 2002 (heats & finals)
- Competitors: 8 from 6 nations
- Winning time: 16:07.86

Medalists
gold medal	Diana Munz	United States
silver medal	Sachiko Yamada	Japan
bronze medal	Morgan Hentzen	United States

The women's 1500 metre freestyle competition at the 2002 Pan Pacific Swimming Championships took place on August 24 at the Yokohama International Swimming Pool. The last champion was Brooke Bennett of US, in 1997. This event wasn't held in 1999.

This event was a timed-final where each swimmer swam just once.

== Records ==
Prior to this competition, the existing world and Pan Pacific records were as follows:

World record	Janet Evans (USA)	15:52.10	Orlando, United States	March 26, 1988
Pan Pacific Championships record	Hayley Lewis (AUS)	16:04.84	Kobe, Japan	August 12, 1993

== Results ==
All times are in minutes and seconds.

KEY:	q	Fastest non-qualifiers	Q	Qualified	CR	Championships record	NR	National record	PB	Personal best	SB	Seasonal best

Rank	Lane	Name	Nationality	Time	Notes
1st place, gold medalist(s)	4	Diana Munz	United States	16:07.86	
2nd place, silver medalist(s)	3	Sachiko Yamada	Japan	16:16.28	
3rd place, bronze medalist(s)	7	Morgan Hentzen	United States	16:29.25	
4	6	Nayara Ribeiro	Brazil	16:33.82	
5	2	Ai Shibata	Japan	16:33.86	
6	1	Taryn Lencoe	Canada	16:42.82	
7	5	Amanda Pascoe	Australia	16:46.84	
8	8	Rebecca Linton	New Zealand	17:18.92	
