= Athletics at the 2003 Pan American Games – Men's hammer throw =

Men's hammer throw at the Pan American Games

The final of the Men's Hammer Throw event at the 2003 Pan American Games took place on Thursday August 7, 2003. The title went to Argentina's Juan Ignacio Cerra, who set a distance of 75.53 metres in his sixth and final attempt. America's John McEwen later was disqualified due to a doping offence. His bronze medal went to number four in the rankings, Cuba's Yosvany Suárez.

== Medalists ==
Gold	Juan Ignacio Cerra; Argentina
Silver	James Parker; United States
Bronze	Yosvany Suárez; Cuba

== Records ==
World Record	Yuriy Sedykh (URS)	86.74 m	August 30, 1986	Stuttgart, West Germany
Pan Am Record	Lance Deal (USA)	79.61 m	July 27, 1999	Winnipeg, Canada

== Results ==
Rank	Athlete	Throws						Final
Rank	Athlete	1	2	3	4	5	6	Result
1	Juan Ignacio Cerra (ARG)	73.24	69.54	72.42	73.85	X	75.53	75.53 m
2	James Parker (USA)	71.70	74.34	73.00	73.95	X	74.35	74.35 m
3	~~John McEwen (USA)~~	66.87	68.42	71.49	68.34	X	X	71.49 m
4	Yosvany Suárez (CUB)	68.54	70.07	X	X	X	70.24	70.24 m
5	Alberto Sánchez (CUB)	X	68.66	X	69.37	X	X	69.37 m
6	Adrián Marzo (ARG)	X	X	68.65	X	X	68.56	68.65 m
7	Raúl Rivera (GUA)	X	65.06	X	63.95	63.23	X	65.06 m
8	Eduardo Acuña (PER)	X	63.30	62.53	62.07	62.20	X	63.30 m

== See also ==
- 2003 World Championships in Athletics – Men's hammer throw
- 2003 Hammer Throw Year Ranking
- Athletics at the 2004 Summer Olympics – Men's hammer throw
