= John McEwen (athlete) =

American hammer thrower

Personal information
- Born: 5 March 1974 (age 52) California, United States

Sport
- Sport: Track and field

John McEwen (born 5 March 1974 in California) is a retired American hammer thrower, who initially won a bronze medal at the 2003 Pan American Games. He later was disqualified due to a doping offence.

He finished sixth at the 2002 IAAF World Cup. At the 2003 American championships he tested positive for the banned substance tetrahydrogestrinone, and was disqualified from his second place.

His personal best throw was 74.73 metres, achieved in April 2003 at the Mt SAC Relays in Walnut.

McEwen was successful playing Football for North Medford High School in Oregon. He went on to play for the College of the Redwoods in Eureka, California and then to Morningside College in Iowa. John and his wife Denise currently live in Ohio with their two small children. John is a firefighter.

== See also ==
- List of sportspeople sanctioned for doping offences
