= Laura Davis (swimmer) =

American medley swimmer

Personal information
- Full name: Laura Davis
- Nationality: United States
- Born: April 21, 1984 (age 42) Concord, California

Sport
- Sport: Swimming
- Strokes: Individual Medley
- Club: Terrapins Swim Team
- College team: Stanford Cardinal (2002-2006)
Medal record
Women's swimming
Pan American Games
Bronze medal – third place	2003 Santo Domingo	200 m medley

Laura Davis (born April 21, 1984) is an American medley swimmer who won the bronze medal in the women's 200 meter individual medley event at the 2003 Pan American Games.

A native of the San Francisco Bay Area city of Concord, she graduated from Stanford University, is completing a Master of Science in Nursing at Samuel Merritt University and, as a member of the Terrapins Team, continues her swimming career.

== Achievements ==
- Competed in three Olympic Trials; 2000, 2004, and 2008.
- Stanford Varsity Swim Team Captain 2005–2006
- NCAA post-graduate scholarship finalist, 2006;
- Division I All-American Athlete
- Pac-10 Scholar-Athlete Award 2003, 2004, 2005, and 2006
- California Scholarship Federation Seal Bearer 2002
- USA Swimming Scholastic All American (#1 ranking) 2000–2002,
- C.I.F.S. Scholar Athlete 1999–2002
- National Champion, 200 IM
