= Venezuela at the 2003 Pan American Games =

- IOC code: VEN
- NOC: Venezuelan Olympic Committee
- Website: www.cov.com.ve

in Santo Domingo 1–17 August 2003
- Medals Ranked 6th: Gold 16 Silver 21 Bronze 27 Total 64

Pan American Games appearances (overview)
- 1951; 1955; 1959; 1963; 1967; 1971; 1975; 1979; 1983; 1987; 1991; 1995; 1999; 2003; 2007; 2011; 2015; 2019; 2023; 2027

The 14th Pan American Games were held in Santo Domingo, Dominican Republic from August 1 to August 17, 2003.

== Medals ==
=== Gold ===
===== Athletics =====
- Men's 3,000m Steeplechase: Néstor Nieves

===== Boxing =====
- Men's Light Welterweight (– 64 kg): Patrick López

===== Fencing =====
- Women's Foil Individual: Mariana González

===== Karate =====
- Men's Kata: Antonio Díaz
- Men's Kumite (– 68 kg): Jean Carlos Peña
- Men's Kumite (+ 80 kg): Mario Toro
- Women's Kata: Yohana Sánchez

===== Shooting =====
- Women's 10 m Air Pistol: Francis Gorrin

===== Swimming =====
- Men's 400 m Freestyle: Ricardo Monasterio
- Men's 1500 m Freestyle: Ricardo Monasterio

===== Taekwondo =====
- Women's – 67 kg: Yaneth Leal

===== Volleyball =====
- Men's Team Competition: Venezuela men's national volleyball team

===== Weightlifting =====
- Men's – 94 kg: Julio César Luña
- Men's + 105 kg: Hidelgar Morillo

=== Silver ===
===== Cycling =====
- Women's Sprint: Daniela Larreal
- Women's Keirin: Daniela Larreal

===== Fencing =====
- Men's Épée Individual: Silvio Fernández
- Men's Épée Team: Silvio Fernández and Rubén Limardo
- Men's Sabre Individual: Carlos Bravo
- Men's Sabre Team: Carlos Bravo, Eliézer Rincones, Charles Briceño, and Juan Silva
- Women's Sabre Individual: Alejandra Benítez

===== Gymnastics =====
- Men's Rings: Regulo Carmona

===== Judo =====
- Men's Half-Lightweight (– 66 kg): Ludwig Ortíz
- Women's Lightweight (– 57 kg): Rudymar Fleming
- Women's Heavyweight (+ 78 kg): Giovanna Blanco

===== Karate =====
- Men's Kumite (– 62 kg): Carlos Luces
- Men's Kumite (– 74 kg): José Ignacio Pérez

===== Swimming =====
- Men's 4 × 100 m Freestyle: Osvaldo Quevedo, Raymond Rosal, Luis Rojas, and Octavio Alesi

===== Taekwondo =====
- Women's – 49 kg: Dalia María Contreras
- Women's + 67 kg: Adriana Carmona

===== Weightlifting =====
- Men's – 69 kg: Amilcar Pernia
- Women's – 63 kg: Solenny Villasmil

=== Bronze ===
===== Archery =====
- Women's Recurve Team: Leydi Brito, Vanessa Chacón, and Rosanna Rosario

===== Athletics =====
- Men's Long Jump: Víctor Castillo

===== Boxing =====
- Men's Light Heavyweight (– 81 kg): Edgar Muñoz
- Men's Light Flyweight (– 48 kg): José Jefferson Perez

===== Cycling =====
- Men's Road Individual Time Trial: Franklin Chacón
- Men's Team Sprint: Alexander Cornieles, Rubén Osorio, and Jhonny Hernández
- Men's Keirin: Rubén Osorio

===== Fencing =====
- Men's Foil Team: Enrique da Silva, Joner Pérez, Carlos Pineda, and Carlos Rodríguez
- Women's Épée Individual: Endrina Álvarez

===== Judo =====
- Men's Extra-Lightweight (– 60 kg): Reiver Alvarenga
- Women's Extra-Lightweight (– 48 kg): Analy Rodríguez
- Women's Half-Lightweight (– 52 kg): Flor Velázquez
- Women's Half-Heavyweight (– 78 kg): Keivi Pinto

===== Weightlifting =====
- Men's – 62 kg: Israel José Rubio
- Men's – 77 kg: Octavio Mejías
- Women's – 48 kg: Remigia Arcila
- Women's – 58 kg: Gretty Lugo
- Women's – 75 kg: Raquel López

== Results by event ==
=== Athletics ===
Track

Athlete	Event	Heat		Final	
Athlete	Event	Time	Rank	Time	Rank
Luis Fonseca	Men's 10000 m	—	—	29:42.30	5
Néstor Nieves	Men's 3000 m steeplechase	—	—	8:34.26	1st place, gold medalist(s)

Road

Athlete	Event	Time	Rank
Larry Alberto Sánchez	Men's marathon	2:42:02	12
Luis Fonseca	Men's marathon	DNF	—

Field

Athlete	Event	Throws						Total	
Athlete	Event	1	2	3	4	5	6	Distance	Rank
Manuel Fuenmayor	Men's javelin throw	66.88	72.63	X	69.03	68.82	71.69	72.63 m	5
Yojer Medina	Men's shot put	18.56	18.99	X	X	19.19	X	19.19 m	6

Heptathlon

Athlete	Women's heptathlon							Total	
Athlete	100 m hurdles	High jump	Shot put	200 m	Long jump	Javelin throw	800 m	Points	Rank
Thaimara Rivas	14.36	1.68	12.56	25.89	5.88	38.62	2:25.16	5472	6

=== Boxing ===
Athlete	Event	Round of 16	Quarterfinals	Semifinals	Final
Athlete	Event	Opposition Result	Opposition Result	Opposition Result	Opposition Result
José Jefferson Perez	Light Flyweight	Bye	Calero (ECU); W 12-5	Bartelemí (CUB); L 2-12 → (bronze)	did not advance
Jean Pérez	Flyweight	Hilares (MEX); L 12-16	did not advance		
Alexander Espinoza	Bantamweight	Bye	Rigondeaux (CUB); L RSCH-3	did not advance	
Nehomar Cermeño	Featherweight	Velasquez (PUR); L 5-12	did not advance		
Omar Coffi	Welterweight	Bye	Angulo (MEX); L 10-11	did not advance	

=== Swimming ===
==== Men's competition ====
Athlete	Event	Heat		Final	
Athlete	Event	Time	Rank	Time	Rank
Raymond Rosal	50 m freestyle	23.41	11	23.47	11
Octavio Alesi	50 m freestyle	23.69	13	23.64	14
Luis Rojas	100 m freestyle	51.22	9	DNS	17
Raymond Rosal	100 m freestyle	51.53	12	DNS	18

==== Women's competition ====
Athlete	Event	Heat		Final	
Athlete	Event	Time	Rank	Time	Rank
Diana López	200 m freestyle	2:09.70	14	2:08.81	13
Arlene Semeco	200 m freestyle	2:12.22	17	did not advance	

=== Triathlon ===
Athlete	Event	Race			Total	
Athlete	Event	Swim	Bike	Run	Time	Rank
Gilberto González	Men's Individual	20:05.500	59:27.500	35:47.200	01:56:16	12
Agustin Fontes	Men's Individual	20:57.100	58:36.900	41:16.400	02:02:00	23
Gabriel Rojas	Men's Individual	20:50.100	58:40.900	44:40.700	02:05:20	25

== See also ==
- Venezuela at the 2004 Summer Olympics
