= Courtney Shealy =

American swimmer (born 1977)

Personal information
- Full name: Courtney Amanda Shealy
- National team: United States
- Born: December 12, 1977 (age 48) Columbia, South Carolina, U.S.
- Height: 6 ft 3 in (1.91 m)
- Weight: 159 lb (72 kg)

Sport
- Sport: Swimming
- Strokes: Freestyle
- Club: Athens Bulldog Swim Club
- College team: University of Georgia
Medal record
Women's swimming
Representing the United States
Olympic Games
Gold medal – first place	2000 Sydney	4×100 m freestyle
Gold medal – first place	2000 Sydney	4×100 m medley
World Championships (LC)
Silver medal – second place	2001 Fukuoka	4×100 m freestyle
Silver medal – second place	2001 Fukuoka	4×100 m medley
Pan American Games
Gold medal – first place	2003 Sto Domingo	100 m freestyle
Gold medal – first place	2003 Sto Domingo	4×100 m freestyle
Silver medal – second place	2003 Sto Domingo	100 m backstroke

Courtney Amanda Shealy (born December 12, 1977), from Irmo, South Carolina, later known by her married name Courtney Hart, is an American former competition swimmer, Olympic gold medalist, and former world record-holder. Shealy swam the third leg of the world record-breaking women's 4×100-meter freestyle relay team that won gold at the 2000 Summer Olympics. Her winning teammates were Jenny Thompson, Dara Torres and Amy Van Dyken. At the same Olympics, she swam in the qualifying heats of the women's 4×100-meter medley relay, and earned a gold medal for doing so. From 2009 to 2024, Courtney was the head coach of the swimming program at Georgia Tech.

== See also ==
- List of Olympic medalists in swimming (women)
- List of University of Georgia people
- List of World Aquatics Championships medalists in swimming (women)
- World record progression 4 × 100 metres medley relay
