= Guillermo Cabrera =

Dominican Republic swimmer (born 1982)

Personal information
- Full name: Guillermo Cabrera González
- National team: Dominican Republic
- Born: 28 February 1982 (age 44) Santo Domingo, Dominican; Republic
- Height: 1.80 m (5 ft 11 in)
- Weight: 68 kg (150 lb)

Sport
- Sport: Swimming
- Strokes: Backstroke

Guillermo Cabrera González (born February 28, 1982) is a Dominican Republic former swimmer, who specialized in backstroke events. Cabrera competed only in the men's 200 m backstroke at the 2000 Summer Olympics in Sydney, as the Dominican Republic's first ever swimmer in Olympic history. He posted a FINA B-standard entry time of 2:07.17 from the Caribbean Islands Swimming Championships in Oranjestad, Aruba. He challenged five other swimmers in heat one, including Hong Kong's Alex Fong, who later became one of city's most popular singers. He raced to fourth place by a 2.75-second deficit behind winner Fong in 2:08.22. Cabrera failed to advance into the semifinals, as he placed forty-first overall in the prelims.
