= Christina Swindle =

American swimmer (born 1984)

Personal information
- Full name: Christina Marie Swindle
- National team: United States
- Born: October 6, 1984 (age 41) Miami, Florida, U.S.

Sport
- Sport: Swimming
- Strokes: Freestyle
- College team: Auburn University
Medal record
Women's swimming
Representing the United States
Pan American Games
Gold medal – first place	2003 Santo Domingo	4x100 m freestyle
Silver medal – second place	2003 Santo Domingo	100 m freestyle

Christina Swindle (born October 6, 1984) is a freestyle swimmer from the United States. Swindle won a gold medal in the 400-metre freestyle relay and a silver medal in the 100-meter freestyle at the 2003 Pan American Games.
