= Ricardo Monasterio =

Venezuelan swimmer (born 1978)

Personal information
- Full name: Ricardo Andrés Monasterio Guimaraes
- National team: Venezuela
- Born: October 22, 1978 (age 47) Caracas, Venezuela
- Height: 1.85 m (6 ft 1 in)
- Weight: 69 kg (152 lb)

Sport
- Sport: Swimming
- Strokes: Freestyle
- College team: University of Florida (U.S.)
Medal record
Men's swimming
Representing Venezuela
Pan American Games
Gold medal – first place	2003 Santo Domingo	400 m free
Gold medal – first place	2003 Santo Domingo	1500 m free
Silver medal – second place	2007 Rio de Janeiro	1500 m free
Bronze medal – third place	1999 Winnipeg	1500 m free
Bronze medal – third place	2011 Guadalajara	4×200 m free

Ricardo Andrés Monasterio Guimaraes (born October 22, 1978) is a former competition swimmer who represented Venezuela at the 1996, 2000, 2004 and 2008 Summer Olympics.

== Career ==
Monasterio was born in Caracas, Venezuela. He attended the University of Florida in Gainesville, Florida, where he swam for coach Gregg Troy's Florida Gators swimming and diving team in National Collegiate Athletic Association (NCAA) competition from 1999 to 2001. He received four All-American honors while swimming for the Gators. Monasterio graduated from the University of Florida with a bachelor's degree in statistics in 2004.

Monasterio won the 200-meter and 400-meter freestyle events at the 2003 Pan American Games.

== See also ==
- List of University of Florida alumni
- List of University of Florida Olympians
- South American records in swimming
