= Luis Rojas (swimmer) =

Venezuelan swimmer (born 1979)

Personal information
- Full name: Luis Enrique Rojas Carpena
- National team: Venezuela
- Born: July 5, 1979 (age 47) Guanare, Venezuela
- Height: 6 ft 1 in (1.85 m)
- Weight: 80 kg (176 lb)

Sport
- Sport: Swimming
- Strokes: Freestyle
- College team: University of Hawaiʻi(1999-'01); University of Arizona (2002-'04)
Medal record
Men's swimming
Representing Venezuela
Pan American Games
Silver medal – second place	2003 Santo Domingo	4×100 m freestyle
Bronze medal – third place	1999 Winnipeg	4×100 m freestyle
Bronze medal – third place	2011 Guadalajara	4×100 m freestyle
Central American and Caribbean Games
Gold medal – first place	2006 Cartagena	4×100 m freestyle
Gold medal – first place	2006 Cartagena	4×100 m medley

Luis Enrique Rojas Carpena (born July 5, 1979) is an Olympic swimmer and National Record holder from Venezuela.

== Career ==
He swam for his native country at the 2004 Olympics. He swam collegiately in the United States, first at the University of Hawaiʻi at Mānoa (1999–2001) and then at the University of Arizona (2002–2004).
