= Morgan Hentzen =

American swimmer (born 1985)

Personal information
- Nationality: United States
- Born: February 1, 1985 (age 41) La Habra Heights, California, U.S.

Sport
- Sport: Swimming
- Strokes: Freestyle
- College team: Stanford Cardinal (2003–2007)
Medal record
Women's swimming
Representing United States
Pan Pacific Championships
Bronze medal – third place	2002 Yokohama	1500m freestyle
Pan American Games
Gold medal – first place	2003 Santo Domingo	800m freestyle
Silver medal – second place	2003 Santo Domingo	400m freestyle

Morgan Hentzen (born February 1, 1985) is a female freestyle swimmer from the United States, who won the gold medal in the women's 800m Freestyle at the 2003 Pan American Games.

== Early life and education ==
Born in La Habra Heights, California, Hentzen graduated from La Serna High School in Whittier, California.
