= Trinidad and Tobago at the 2003 Pan American Games =

- IOC code: TRI
- NOC: Trinidad and Tobago Olympic Committee

in Santo Domingo 1–17 August 2003
- Medals Ranked 14th: Gold 2 Silver 4 Bronze 1 Total 7

Pan American Games appearances (overview)
- 1951; 1955; 1959; 1963; 1967; 1971; 1975; 1979; 1983; 1987; 1991; 1995; 1999; 2003; 2007; 2011; 2015; 2019; 2023; 2027

The 14th Pan American Games were held in Santo Domingo, Dominican Republic from August 1 to August 17, 2003.

== Medals ==
=== Gold ===
===== Swimming =====
- Men's 200 m Freestyle: George Bovell
- Men's 200 m IM: George Bovell

=== Silver ===
===== Athletics =====
- Men's 4×100 metres: Nicconnor Alexander, Marc Burns, Ato Boldon, and Darrel Brown

===== Boxing =====
- Men's Heavyweight (– 91 kg): Kertson Manswell

===== Swimming =====
- Men's 100 m Freestyle: George Bovell
- Men's 100 m Backstroke: George Bovell

=== Bronze ===
===== Athletics =====
- Women's Hammer Throw: Candice Scott

== Results by event ==
=== Athletics ===
Athlete	Event	Throws						Total	
Athlete	Event	1	2	3	4	5	6	Distance	Rank
Candice Scott	Women's Hammer	X	X	64.16	X	69.06	X	69.06 m	3rd place, bronze medalist(s)
Dave Stoute	Men's Shot Put	17.11	17.65	17.28	17.47	—	17.36	17.65 m	8
Cleopatra Borel-Brown	Women's Shot Put	16.18	17.23	17.11	X	X	X	17.23 m	6

=== Boxing ===
Athlete	Event	Round of 16	Quarterfinals	Semifinals	Final
Athlete	Event	Opposition Result	Opposition Result	Opposition Result	Opposition Result
Kertson Manswell	Heavyweight	Orozco (COL); W 15-3	García (DOM); W 12-5	Vargas (USA); W 14-12	Solis (CUB); L 15-3 → (silver)

=== Swimming ===
==== Men's Competition ====
Athlete	Event	Heat		Final	
Athlete	Event	Time	Rank	Time	Rank
Nicholas Bovell	50 m freestyle	24.05	20	did not advance	
George Bovell	100 m freestyle	49.97	1	49.61	2nd place, silver medalist(s)
George Bovell	200 m freestyle	1:51.00	2	1:48.90	1st place, gold medalist(s)
Nicholas Bovell	200 m freestyle	1:55.65	16	1:54.25	11

==== Women's Competition ====
Athlete	Event	Heat		Final	
Athlete	Event	Time	Rank	Time	Rank
Sharntelle McLean	50 m freestyle	26.92	8	26.82	7
Sharntelle McLean	100 m freestyle	59.52	13	59.55	14
Shannon Duval	200 m breaststroke	2:43.83	10	2:41.56	9

== See also ==
- Trinidad and Tobago at the 2002 Central American and Caribbean Games
- Trinidad and Tobago at the 2004 Summer Olympics
