= Chile at the 2003 Pan American Games =

- IOC code: CHI
- NOC: Comité Olímpico de Chile

in Santo Domingo 1–17 August 2003
- Flag bearer: Marco Antonio Verni
- Medals Ranked 13th: Gold 2 Silver 10 Bronze 10 Total 22

Pan American Games appearances (overview)
- 1951; 1955; 1959; 1963; 1967; 1971; 1975; 1979; 1983; 1987; 1991; 1995; 1999; 2003; 2007; 2011; 2015; 2019; 2023; 2027

Chile participated at the 2003 Pan American Games, held in Santo Domingo, Dominican Republic, from 1 to 17 August 2003.

== Medalists ==
Medal	Name	Sport	Event
Gold	Miguel Cerda; Félipe Leal; Javier Godoy; Christián Yantani	Rowing	Men's coxless four
Gold	Luis Sepúlveda; Marco Arriagada; Enzo Cesario; Antonio Cabrera	Cycling	Men's team pursuit
Silver	Christián Escalante	Weightlifting	Men's 105 kg
Silver	Fabian Lopez; Johnnathan Tafra	Canoeing	C2-1000 m
Silver	Marcelo Ríos	Tennis	Men's singles
Silver	Marco Arriagada	Cycling	Men's pursuit individual
Silver	Marco Arriagada	Cycling	Men's points race
Silver	Jose Guzman	Roller skating	Men's short distances
Silver	Pamela Verdugo	Roller skating	Women's short distances
Silver	Marco Antonio Verni	Athletics	Men's shot put
Silver	Marcelo Ríos; Adrian Garcia	Tennis	Men's doubles
Silver	Carolina Torres	Athletics	Women's pole vault
Bronze	José Medina	Cycling	Men's individual road race
Bronze	Berta Rodríguez	Table tennis	Women's individual
Bronze	Soraya Jadue; María Orellana	Rowing	Women's pairs lightweight
Bronze	Érika Olivera	Athletics	Women's marathon
Bronze	Paris Inostroza	Fencing	Men's épée
Bronze	Angela Grisar	Racquetball	Women's singles
Bronze	Alberto Gonzalez; Pablo Barahona; Marcelo Avaria; Claus Engel	Sailing	Men's J-24
Bronze	Francisca Campos	Cycling	Women's cross country
Bronze	Kristel Köbrich	Swimming	Women's 800 metres
Bronze	Matias Del Solar	Sailing	Men's Laser Radial

== Results by event ==
=== Athletics ===
Track

Athlete	Event	Heat		Final	
Athlete	Event	Time	Rank	Time	Rank
Mauricio Díaz	Men's 10000 m	—	—	DNS	—
Luz Silva	Women's 10000 m	—	—	37:11.17	8

Road

Athlete	Event	Time	Rank
Érika Olivera	Women's marathon	2:44:52	3rd place, bronze medalist(s)
Cristian Muñoz	Men's 20 km race walk	1:31:07	6

Field

Athlete	Event	Throws						Total	
Athlete	Event	1	2	3	4	5	6	Distance	Rank
Diego Moraga	Men's javelin throw	67.43	68.12	69.25	71.79	68.77	71.78	71.79 m	7
Odette Palma	Women's hammer throw	53.51	54.14	52.46	—	—	—	54.14 m	10
Marianne Berndt	Women's discus throw	42.45	X	41.87	X	—	—	42.45 m	8
Marco Antonio Verni	Men's shot put	19.61	20.14	X	19.49	19.52	19.89	20.14 m	2nd place, silver medalist(s)
Marianne Berndt	Women's shot put	15.16	X	15.37	X	X	X	15.37 m	8

Heptathlon

Athlete	Heptathlon							Total	
Athlete	1	2	3	4	5	6	7	Points	Rank
Valeria Steffens	15.23	1.62	12.10	25.91	5.20	34.99	2:24.75	4988	8

=== Swimming ===
==== Men's competitions ====
Athlete	Event	Heat		Final	
Athlete	Event	Time	Rank	Time	Rank
Max Schnettler	50 m freestyle	24.45	22	did not advance	
Max Schnettler	100 m freestyle	52.55	24	did not advance	
Carlos Castro	100 m freestyle	53.00	26	did not advance	

==== Women's competitions ====
Athlete	Event	Heat		Final	
Athlete	Event	Time	Rank	Time	Rank
Kristel Köbrich	400 m freestyle	4:19.83	6	4:18.24	7
Kristel Köbrich	800 m freestyle	—		8:43.90	3rd place, bronze medalist(s)

=== Tennis ===
Men

Athlete	Event	Round of 64	Round of 32	Round of 16	Quarterfinals	Semifinals	Final / BM	
Athlete	Event	Opposition Score	Opposition Score	Opposition Score	Opposition Score	Opposition Score	Opposition Score	Rank
Adrián García	Singles	Arévalo (ESA); W 6–0, 6–1	Richards (ISV); W 6–1, 6–0	Morrison (USA); L 3–6, 5–7	did not advance			
Marcelo Ríos	Singles	Bye	Stone (TTO); W 6–2, 6–2	Cuéllar (ESA); W 6–0, 6–3	Gallardo (MEX); W 7–6^{(7–1)}, 6–1	Kim (USA); W 7–6^{(11–9)}, 7–6^{(7–4)}	Meligeni (BRA); L 7–5, 6–7^{(6–8)}, 6–7^{(5–7)}	2nd place, silver medalist(s)
Adrián García; Marcelo Ríos	Doubles	—N/a	Bye	Callender / Richards (ISV); W 6–1, 6–2	Felder / Vilarrubí (URU); W 6–3, 6–1	Bogomolov Jr. / Morrison (USA); W 6–2, 6–1	González / Hernández (MEX); L 7–6^{(7–5)}, 2–6, 3–6	2nd place, silver medalist(s)

=== Triathlon ===
Athlete	Event	Race			Total	
Athlete	Event	Swim	Bike	Run	Time	Rank
Felipe van de Wyngard	Men's individual	19:56.800	57:49.400	38:23.800	01:57:11	13
Matias Optiz	Men's individual	22:07.000	1:00:50.500	36:19.700	02:00:15	19
Cristian Bustos	Men's individual	23:18.800	1:00:20.200	—	DNF	—

== See also ==
- Chile at the 2004 Summer Olympics
