= Carlos Velásquez =

Puerto Rican boxer (born 1984)

Personal information
- Born: August 4, 1984 (age 41) Cataño, Puerto Rico

Sport
- Sport: Boxing
Medal record
Men's boxing
Representing Puerto Rico
Central American and Caribbean Games
| Gold medal – first place | 2006 Cartagena | Featherweight |

Carlos Iván Velásquez Piri (born August 4, 1984) is a Puerto Rican former boxer best known for winning the featherweight title at the Central American and Caribbean Games 2006 in Cartagena. He is the twin brother of Juan Carlos Velasquez.

== Amateur career ==
Velásquez participated in the 2004 Olympics at the age of 20 at featherweight but lost his first match to Edvaldo Oliveira of Brazil, by decision (43-43;countback). He qualified for the Olympic Games by ending up in second place at the 1st AIBA American 2004 Olympic Qualifying Tournament in Tijuana, Mexico.

At the 2006 Central American and Caribbean Games, he defeated Marlon Almagro (Venezuela), upset Olympic champion Yuriorkis Gamboa 10:7 in the semifinals and won Gold against Ronald de la Rosa (Dominican Republic).

== Professional career ==
Velásquez turned pro for promoter Luis de Cubas and Shelly Finkel and won his first 12 fights.

On September 14, 2008, he (9–0, 8 KOs) knocked out Jose Navarrete (12–18–2, 5 KOs) at 1:11 of the fifth round of the eighth-rounder.

On September 29, 2015, Velasquez fought Javier Fortuna for Fortuna's WBA's world Super Featherweight title in Las Vegas, Nevada. In what has ultimately turned out to be his last fight, Velasquez lost by tenth-round technical knockout.

Velasquez retired from professional boxing with 19 wins and 2 defeats in 21 contests, 12 wins and both losses being by knockout.
