= Peter Marshall (swimmer) =

American swimmer (born 1982)

Personal information
- Full name: Peter Jeffrey Marshall
- National team: United States
- Born: March 9, 1982 (age 44) Atlanta, Georgia, U.S.
- Height: 6 ft 1 in (185 cm)

Sport
- Sport: Swimming
- Strokes: Backstroke
- Club: Trojan Swim Club
- College team: Stanford University
Medal record
Men's swimming
Representing the United States
World Championships (SC)
Gold medal – first place	2002 Moscow	4x100 m freestyle
Gold medal – first place	2002 Moscow	4x100 m medley
Gold medal – first place	2008 Manchester	50 m backstroke
Gold medal – first place	2004 Indianapolis	4x100 m medley
Silver medal – second place	2002 Moscow	50 m backstroke
Bronze medal – third place	2002 Moscow	100 m backstroke
Bronze medal – third place	2004 Indianapolis	50 m backstroke
Pan American Games
Gold medal – first place	2003 Santo Domingo	100 m backstroke
Gold medal – first place	2003 Santo Domingo	4x100 m medley
Gold medal – first place	2007 Rio	4x100 m medley
Silver medal – second place	2007 Rio	100 m backstroke
Summer Universiade
Gold medal – first place	2001 Beijing	50 m backstroke
Gold medal – first place	2001 Beijing	100 m backstroke
Gold medal – first place	2001 Beijing	4x100 m medley

Peter Jeffrey Marshall (born March 9, 1982) is an American competition swimmer who specializes in the backstroke. He is a former world record holder in the 50-meter backstroke (short course) and the 100-meter backstroke (short course).

He has won a total of fourteen medals in major international competition—ten gold, two silver, and two bronze—spanning the World Championships, Pan American Games, and Pan Pacific Championships.

== Career ==
Over his career Peter Marshall has broken eight world records (4×100-meter medley relay 2002, 100-meter backstroke 2004, 100-meter backstroke 2008, 50-meter backstroke 2008, 100-meter backstroke 2008, 50-meter backstroke 2009, 50-meter backstroke 2009, 50-meter backstroke 2009) and won two world titles (4×100-meter medley relay scm 2002, and 50 Backstroke scm 2008). He currently holds the US Open record and NCAA record in the 100-meter backstroke (short course meters), and was a part of the American team that set the world record in the 4×100-meter medley relay (now surpassed). He is a two-time National A team member (2001, 2004), a three-time National B team member (2002, 2005, 2006) and a six-time NCAA All-American. He earned his first national championship in the 100-meter backstroke in the summer of 2001 in Clovis, California. While at Stanford University, he won three consecutive Individual NCAA Titles in the 100-meter backstroke. In 2004 he was named Pac-10 Swimmer of the Year for his first individual world record set at the NCAA Championships in Long Island, New York.

He was a member of the 2001 World University Games team, the 2002 Pan Pacific Swimming Championships, the 2002 Short Course World Championships, the 2003 Pan American Games, the 2004 Short Course World Championships, 2006 Pan Pacific Swimming Championships, 2007 Pan American Games, and the 2008 Short Course World Championships.

Marshall began his swimming career at the Dynamo Swim Club, one of the premier swim groups in America. He is a graduate of Marist School in Atlanta, Georgia (2000) and Stanford University (2004). He has one older sister (Heather) and two younger brothers (John and Gary). His cousin, Gary Marshall, also swam for Stanford after transferring from the University of Virginia.

== See also ==
- List of Stanford University people
- Pan American Games records in swimming
- World record progression 50 metres backstroke
- World record progression 100 metres backstroke
- World record progression 4 × 100 metres medley relay

Records
Preceded by – Ryan Lochte	Men's 100-meter backstroke world record-holder (short course); March 26, 2004 – April 9, 2006; November 11, 2008 – December 14, 2008	Succeeded by Ryan Lochte; Stanislav Donets
Preceded by Robert Hurley; Randall Bal	Men's 50-meter backstroke world record-holder (short course); November 12, 2008 – November 15, 2008; October 17, 2009 – December 6, 2014	Succeeded by Randall Bal; Florent Manaudou
