= Staciana Stitts =

American swimmer (born 1981)

Personal information
- Full name: Staciana Stitts Winfield
- National team: United States
- Born: September 12, 1981 (age 45) Columbus, Ohio, U.S.
- Height: 5 ft 10 in (1.78 m)
- Weight: 146 lb (66 kg)
- Spouse: Brett Winfield

Sport
- Sport: Swimming
- Event: 100, 200 breaststroke
- Strokes: Breaststroke
- Club: Irvine Novaquatics
- College team: University of California, Berkeley
- Coach: Dave Salo (Novaquatics); Teri McKeever (UC Berkeley)
Medal record
Women's swimming
Representing the United States
Olympic Games
Gold medal – first place	2000 Sydney	4×100 m medley
Pan American Games
Gold medal – first place	1999 Winnipeg	100 m breaststroke
Gold medal – first place	1999 Winnipeg	4×100 m medley
Gold medal – first place	2003 Santo Domingo	100 m breaststroke
Gold medal – first place	2003 Santo Domingo	4×100 m medley

Staciana Stitts Winfield (née Stitts; born September 12, 1981) is an American former competition swimmer and breaststroke specialist. She was a 2000 Summer Olympics and 1999 Pan American Games gold medalist, and 1998 Goodwill Games silver medalist.

== Early life ==
Staciana Stitts was born September 12, 1981, in Columbus, Ohio, to Dane and Judy Stitts, and graduated Carlsbad High School in 1999. With a noteworthy high school swimming career, she was the recipient of All-CIF Southern Section honors four times, and in her signature event, the 100 breaststroke, was a CIF record holder and champion four times. As a High School Junior, she had the first ranked National High School time in the 100 breast of 1:01.50. Her parents, who reside in Encinitas, California are both high school teachers at Carlsbad High School, and she has two brothers, and a sister, Alicia who swam for the University of Iowa. Brother Joseph Stitts swam for University of California, Davis.

In July 15, 2000, at the Janet Evans Invitational at the University of Southern California, she finished third in the 200 breaststroke. In 2000, she trained with Hall of Fame Coach Dave Salo and his Irvine Novaquatics team in preparation for the Sydney Olympics.

== 2000 Sydney Olympics ==
In the 2000 Olympic trials in Indianapolis, Indiana, Stitts placed second in the 100-meter breaststroke with a time of 1:07.79, qualifying her for the U.S. Team.

Later, in September, 2000, she became a 2000 Summer Olympics gold medalist in the 4x100 meter medley relay. She did not swim in the finals, but swam in Preliminary Heat Three, completing her breaststroke leg in 2:12.15, with an overall preliminary relay team time of 4:06.16. Her preliminary team placed a very close second to the German team, qualifying the American team of B.J. Bedford, Megan Quann, Jenny Thompson, and Dara Torres to win the gold medal in a world record time of 3:58.30 in the finals, 3.29 seconds ahead of the silver medal Australian team. Stitts also swam the 100-meter breaststroke, finishing 18th overall with a time of 1:10.54 in the preliminaries.

== University of California, Berkeley ==
In 2004, she graduated from the University of California with a Bachelor of Arts degree, as an American studies major focusing on Sports Sociology. She swam for women's coach Teri McKeever at Berkeley, a 30 year swim coach at Berkeley, who led the team to four NCAA national team championships during her tenure. As a college sophomore in 2000-2001, Stitts was a recipient of All-America honors swimming on the 200 and 400 medley relay team that captured a second place finish place at the NCAA Championships. That year she was an All-Academic honoree in the Pac-10 Conference, and won the Golden Bear Award for the second successive year. Stitts and her University of California, Berkeley teammates Haley Cope, Joscelin Yeo, and Praphalsai Minpraphal broke the 4×50-meter medley relay short-course world record in 2000 with a time of 1:49.23.

She married Brett Winfield in September, 2004.

== Coaching ==
From 2005 to 2006, Stitts-Winfield worked at the College of Charleston as an assistant swimming coach. In June 2006, Stitts-Winfield was named an assistant swimming coach at University of Southern California (USC).

Stitts-Winfield states, "The life significance of losing my hair at age 12 from alopecia areata has made me a very strong, determined person." She has been a motivational speaker at the National Alopecia Areata Foundation's Teens Conference Camp and has been a spokesperson for the Children's Alopecia Project.

== See also ==
- List of Olympic medalists in swimming (women)
- List of University of California, Berkeley alumni
