= Dana Kirk (swimmer) =

American swimmer

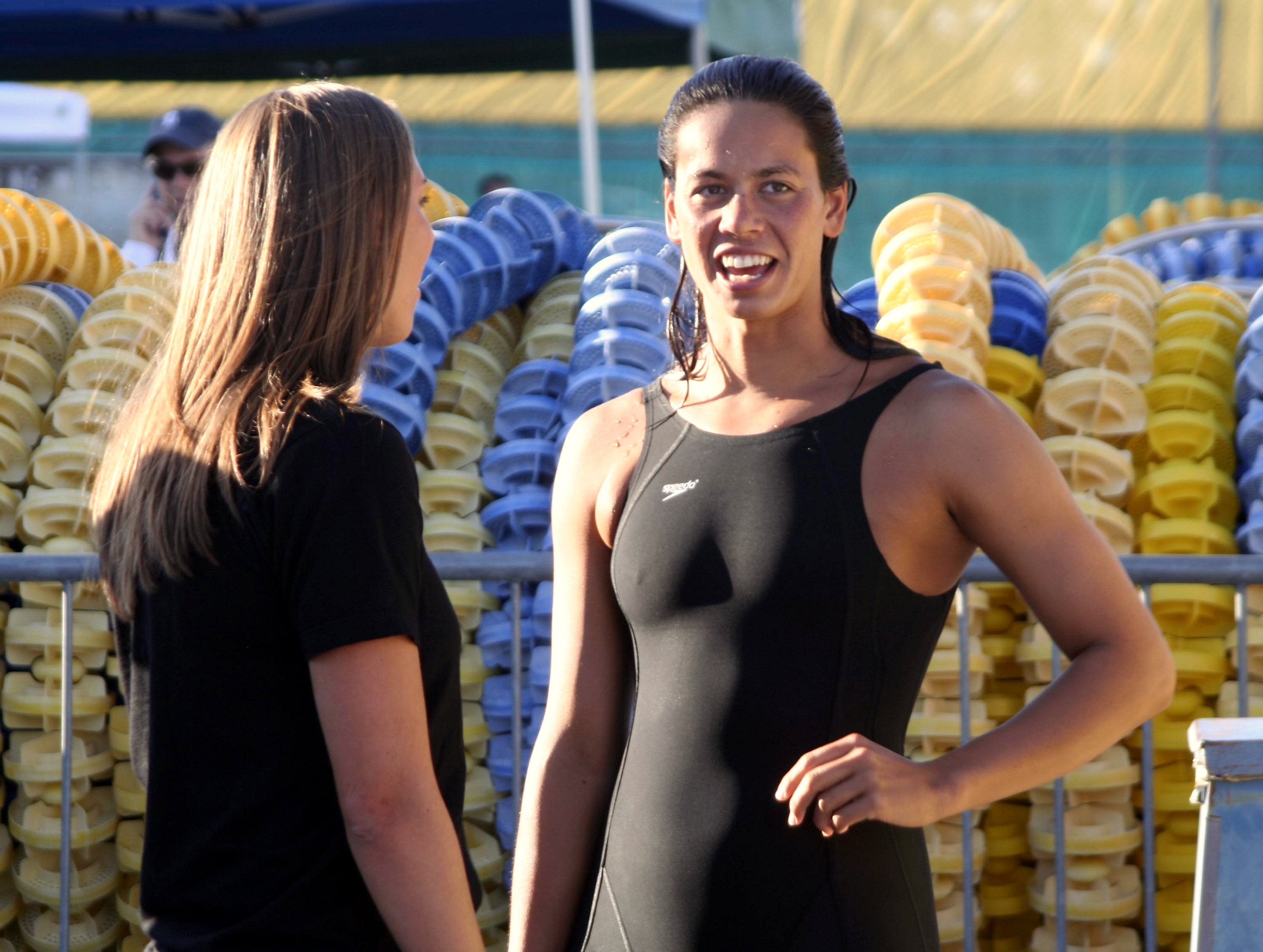
- Kirk in 2007, after Stanford graduation

Personal information
- National team: United States
- Born: June 23, 1984 (age 42) Bremerton, Washington, U.S.
- Occupation: Swim Coach
- Height: 177 cm (5 ft 10 in)
- Weight: 65 kg (143 lb)
- Spouse: Jason
- Children: 3

Sport
- Sport: Swimming
- Strokes: Butterfly
- Club: Tacoma Swim Club
- College team: Stanford University
- Coach: Jay Benner (Tacoma SC); Richard Quick (Stanford)
Medal record
Women's swimming
Representing the United States
Pan American Games
Bronze medal – third place	2003 Santo Domingo	100 m butterfly
Bronze medal – third place	2003 Santo Domingo	200 m butterfly

Dana Kirk (born June 23, 1984) is an American former competition swimmer, who competed for Stanford University, and was a 2004 Olympian and 2003 Pan American Games bronze medalist in both the 100 and 200-meter butterfly.

== Early swimming ==
Kirk was born June 23, 1984 in Bremerton, Washington, to Jeff and Margaret Kirk and attended Bremerton High School graduating in 2002. At Bremerton High, she had a 3.7 grade point average and was a Senior Class President. When swimming for Bremerton High, she was coached by Mark Fitzgerald, and in club competition, she competed and trained with the Tacoma Swim Club under Coach Jay Benner.

As a High School upperclassman, she captured the U.S. Summer national championship in August 2001 in Fresno in the 100-meter butterfly with a time of 1:01.65, placing second in the 200-meter butterfly. She won a silver medal with the 4x100 medley relay team with a time of 4:08.13 at the 2001 U.S. Goodwill Games in Brisbane, Australia, where she enjoyed the recognition provided by the large Australian crowds. Representing Bremerton High in November 2001, she won two class 4A Washington State Titles, setting both state and meet records in the 200-yard freestyle with a time of 1:49.16 and the 100-yard butterfly with a time of 53.99. She was named the swimmer of the meet, and became an All American.

In demanding international competition, in April 2002, Dana placed eighth in the Moscow World Short Course Championships with a 2:12.51 in the 200-meter butterfly.

At the August 12, 2002 Phillips 66 Summer National Swimming Championships in Fort Lauderdale, Kirk broke the 1 minute barrier for the 100-meter butterfly for the first time, recording a personal best time of 59.81, placing fifth overall against America's best competitors in the event including first place Natalie Coughlin and second place Jenny Thompson.

== 2004 Athens Olympics ==
After two years at Stanford, Kirk attended the July 2004 U.S. Olympic Trials in Long Beach, California, placing first in the 200-meter fly and 4th in the 100-meter fly.

After travelling with the team for the 2004 Athens Olympics she competed in the women's 200-meter butterfly, finishing ninth in the event semifinals with a time of 2:10.69, and did not make the finals. At the Olympic's Kirk's Head coach was USC Coach Mark Schubert.

=== Stanford University ===
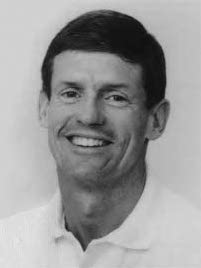
Coach Quick, 1988

Kirk attended Stanford University on a full athletic scholarship, beginning in the fall of 2002, where she swam for the Stanford Cardinal swimming and diving team in National Collegiate Athletic Association (NCAA) competition under Hall of Fame Coach Richard Quick. Having already achieved several national championships while at Stanford, Quick was the U.S. Olympic Women's Head Coach in both 1996 and 2000. During her four-year college swimming career, Kirk amassed seventeen All-American honors and eight Pac-10 Conference titles in the 200-yard medley and 400-yard medley relays, as well as the 100-yard and 200-yard butterfly events. She is currently the fourth fastest 100-yard and 200-yard butterfly swimmer in Stanford history. She graduated from Stanford in 2006.

At the 2003 Pan American Games in Santo Domingo, she captured bronze medals in both the 100 meter and 200 m butterfly events.

=== Honors ===
In 2002, Dana was a Kitsap Sun High School Athlete of the Year and was later inducted into the Kitsap Sun Sports Hall of Fame in 2009. For her work in the swimming community, Dana was awarded the 2009 Kerry O’Brien Coaches Award for Coaches building membership in the communities they grew up in.

Kirk's older sister, Tara, who also attended Stanford, joined her on the 2004 USA Women's Olympic Swimming team, becoming the first set of sisters to swim on the same U.S. Olympic Team.

== Post swimming careers ==
After back surgery, Kirk retired from swimming at the Olympic level after failing to qualify for the 2008 Olympic trials. In 2008, she started Dana Kirk Swimming. She coaches the Fremont Hills Barracudas and since 2008 has served as head coach for the Palo Alto Stanford Aquatics affiliate PASA-DKS program since 2008. She has also worked for the Greenmeadow, Los Altos Golf & Country Club, and has been Aquatics Director at Fremont Hills since 2011. She has three children with her husband Jason.

== See also ==
- List of Stanford University people
