= George Bovell =

Trinidad and Tobago swimmer (born 1983)

Personal information
- Full name: George Lycott Bovell III
- Nationality: Trinidad and Tobago
- Born: 18 July 1983 (age 42) Guelph, Ontario, Canada
- Height: 1.96 m (6 ft 5 in)
- Weight: 93 kg (205 lb)

Sport
- Sport: Swimming
- Strokes: Individual medley, freestyle
- College team: Auburn Tigers
Medal record
Men's swimming
Representing Trinidad and Tobago
Olympic Games
Bronze medal – third place	2004 Athens	200 m medley
World Championships (LC)
Bronze medal – third place	2013 Barcelona	50 m freestyle
World Championships (SC)
Bronze medal – third place	2012 Istanbul	100 m medley
Pan American Games
Gold medal – first place	2003 Santo Domingo	200 m freestyle
Gold medal – first place	2003 Santo Domingo	200 m medley
Silver medal – second place	2003 Santo Domingo	100 m freestyle
Silver medal – second place	2003 Santo Domingo	100 m backstroke
Bronze medal – third place	2007 Rio	50 m freestyle
Bronze medal – third place	2015 Toronto	50 m freestyle
Central American and Caribbean Games
Gold medal – first place	2006 Cartagena	50 m freestyle
Gold medal – first place	2010 Mayagüez	50 m freestyle
Gold medal – first place	2014 Veracruz	50 m freestyle
Silver medal – second place	2010 Mayagüez	50 m backstroke
Silver medal – second place	2010 Mayagüez	4x100 m freestyle
Bronze medal – third place	2006 Cartagena	100 m freestyle
Bronze medal – third place	2006 Cartagena	200 m freestyle
Bronze medal – third place	2014 Veracruz	50 m backstroke

George Richard Lycott Bovell (born 18 July 1983) is an Olympic bronze medalist swimmer and former world record holder from Trinidad and Tobago. Bovell is also a two-time World Championship bronze medalist.

== Olympic career ==
George Bovell represented Trinidad and Tobago at the 2000, 2004, 2008, 2012, and 2016 Olympics. At the 2004 Olympics, he won a bronze medal in the men's 200 IM: the 9th medalist in the country's history and 12th medal overall.

== World Championships ==
In 2013 Bovell won the bronze medal in the 50m freestyle at the FINA World Long Course Championships in Barcelona. His Bronze Medal time of 21.51 seconds would have won the silver in the London Olympic Final a year earlier.

In 2012 Bovell won the bronze medal in the 100m Individual Medley at the Fina World Short Course Championships in Istanbul.

Bovell has been in 10 World Championship finals since 2001.

== Main Events ==
Year	Event	Race	Position
2000	Summer Olympics	50m Freestyle	Heats
2000	Summer Olympics	200m Ind Medley	Heats
2000	Summer Olympics	400m Ind Medley	Heats
2001	World Championship	200m Freestyle	Heats
2001	World Championship	200m Ind Medley	Finals 4th
2001	World Championship	400m Ind Medley	Heats
2002	Short Course World Championship	200m Freestyle	Semifinal
2002	Short Course World Championship	100m Ind Medley	Semifinal
2002	Short Course World Championship	200m Ind Medley	7°
2003	World Championship	200m Freestyle	Semifinal
2003	World Championship	200m Ind Medley	5°
2004	Summer Olympics	100m Freestyle	Semifinal
2004	Summer Olympics	200m Freestyle	Semifinal
2004	Summer Olympics	200m Ind Medley	3rd place, bronze medalist(s)
2006	Pan Pacific Championship	50m Freestyle	8°
2006	Pan Pacific Championship	100m Freestyle	B Final
2007	World Championship	50m Freestyle	Heats
2007	World Championship	100m Freestyle	Heats
2008	Summer Olympics	50m Freestyle	Semifinal
2008	Summer Olympics	100m Freestyle	Heats
2008	Short Course World Championship	50m Freestyle	Semifinal
2008	Short Course World Championship	100m Ind Medley	8°
2009	World Championship	50m Freestyle	Finals 7th
2009	World Championship	100m Freestyle	Heats
2010	Pan Pacific Championship	50m Freestyle	B Final
2010	Pan Pacific Championship	100m Freestyle	Heats
2010	Pan Pacific Championship	50m Backstroke	B Final
2010	Short Course World Championship	50m Freestyle	Semifinal
2010	Short Course World Championship	100m Ind Medley	4°
2011	World Championship	50m Freestyle	7°
2012	Summer Olympics	50m Freestyle	7°
2012	Summer Olympics	100m Backstroke	Heats
2012	Short Course World Championship	50m Freestyle	4°
2012	Short Course World Championship	100m Ind Medley	3rd place, bronze medalist(s)
2013	World Championship	50m Freestyle	3rd place, bronze medalist(s)

Records
Preceded by Attila Czene	World Record Holder; Men's 200 Individual Medley (25m); 25 March 2004 – 8 December 2005	Succeeded by László Cseh
Olympic Games
Preceded by Ato Boldon	Flagbearer for Trinidad and Tobago; Beijing 2008	Succeeded by Marc Burns
