= Ecuador at the 2003 Pan American Games =

- IOC code: ECU
- NOC: Comité Olímpico Ecuatoriano
- Website: www.coe.org.ec

in Santo Domingo 1–17 August 2003
- Flag bearer: María Escobar
- Medals Ranked 12th: Gold 3 Silver 1 Bronze 5 Total 9

Pan American Games appearances (overview)
- 1951; 1955; 1959; 1963; 1967; 1971; 1975; 1979; 1983; 1987; 1991; 1995; 1999; 2003; 2007; 2011; 2015; 2019; 2023; 2027

Ecuador participated at the 2003 Pan American Games, held in Santo Domingo, Dominican Republic, from 1 to 17 August 2003. It was one of the most successful Pan American Games for Ecuador in which they won 9 total medals.

== Medals ==
=== Gold ===
===== Weightlifting =====
- Men's 105 kg: Boris Burov
- Women's 58 kg: María Escobar

=== Silver ===
===== Weightlifting =====
- Women's +75 kg: Seledina Nieve

=== Bronze ===
===== Karate =====
- Women's Kata: Yessenia Reyes

===== Taekwondo =====
- Women's 57 kg: Elizabeth Franco

== Results by event ==
=== Athletics ===
Track

Athlete	Event	Heat		Final	
Athlete	Event	Time	Rank	Time	Rank
Mónica Amboya	Women's 1500 m	—	—	4:27.22	9
Silvia Paredes	Women's 5000 m	—	—	17:46.03	9
Richard Arias	Men's 3000 m steeplechase	—	—	9:21.91	7

Road

Athlete	Event	Time	Rank
Silvio Guerra	Men's marathon	DNF	—
Martha Tenorio	Women's marathon	DNF	—
Jefferson Pérez	Men's 20 km race walk	1:23:06	1st place, gold medalist(s)
Fausto Quinde	Men's 20 km race walk	DNF	—

=== Boxing ===
Athlete	Event	Round of 16	Quarterfinals	Semifinals	Final
Athlete	Event	Opposition Result	Opposition Result	Opposition Result	Opposition Result
Patricio Calero	Light flyweight	Bye	Perez (VEN); L 5–12	did not advance	
Germán Torres	Flyweight	Jimenez (ESA); W 28–13	Gamboa (CUB); L RSCO–2	did not advance	
Walter Tadeo	Featherweight	Gaudet (CAN); L 5–14	did not advance		
Ramiro Quiñonez	Lightweight	Díaz (DOM); L 5–23	did not advance		
Eduardo Beltrán	Light heavyweight	Bye	Hernández (CUB); L RSC–1	did not advance	
Beber Espinoza	Super heavyweight	Bye	López Núñez (CUB); L RSC–2	did not advance	

=== Swimming ===
==== Men's competitions ====
Athlete	Event	Heat		Final	
Athlete	Event	Time	Rank	Time	Rank
Julio Santos	50 m freestyle	23.33	9	23.39	9
Felipe Delgado	50 m freestyle	23.62	12	23.48	12

=== Triathlon ===
Athlete	Event	Race			Total	
Athlete	Event	Swim	Bike	Run	Time	Rank
Carlos Loor	Men's individual	20:04.200	59:31.600	41:46.900	02:02:26	24
Juan Enderica	Men's individual	21:00.800	—	—	DNF	—
Angel Mogrovejo	Men's individual	21:32.700	—	—	DNF	—

== See also ==
- Ecuador at the 2004 Summer Olympics
