= Barbados at the 2003 Pan American Games =

- IOC code: BAR
- NOC: Barbados Olympic Association

in Santo Domingo 1–17 August 2003
- Flag bearer: Dominic Hill
- Medals Ranked 28th: Gold 0 Silver 0 Bronze 1 Total 1

Pan American Games appearances (overview)
- 1963; 1967; 1971; 1975; 1979; 1983; 1987; 1991; 1995; 1999; 2003; 2007; 2011; 2015; 2019; 2023

The 14th Pan American Games were held in Santo Domingo, Dominican Republic from August 1 to August 17, 2003.

== Medals ==
=== Bronze ===
===== Athletics =====
- Women's 400 m Hurdles: Andrea Blackett

== Results by event ==
=== Athletics ===
Track

Athlete	Event	Heat		Final	
Athlete	Event	Time	Rank	Time	Rank
Andrea Blackett	Women's 400 m hurdles	55.86	5	55.24	3rd place, bronze medalist(s)

=== Swimming ===
==== Men's Competition ====
Athlete	Event	Heat		Final	
Athlete	Event	Time	Rank	Time	Rank
Damian Alleyne	100 m freestyle	52.13	18	51.89	14
Damian Alleyne	200 m freestyle	1:53.19	9	1:53.22	9
Bradley Ally	200 m freestyle	1:56.41	18	did not advance	

== See also ==
- Barbados at the 2004 Summer Olympics
