= Puerto Rico at the 2003 Pan American Games =

- IOC code: PUR
- NOC: Puerto Rico Olympic Committee

in Santo Domingo 1–17 August 2003
- Flag bearer: Diego Lizardi
- Medals Ranked 11th: Gold 3 Silver 4 Bronze 9 Total 16

Pan American Games appearances (overview)
- 1951; 1955; 1959; 1963; 1967; 1971; 1975; 1979; 1983; 1987; 1991; 1995; 1999; 2003; 2007; 2011; 2015; 2019; 2023; 2027

Puerto Rico participated at the 2003 Pan American Games, held in Santo Domingo, Dominican Republic, from August 1 to August 17, 2003.

== Medals ==
=== Gold ===
===== Equestrian =====
- Jumping individual: Mark Watring on Sapphire

===== Gymnastics =====
- Men's horizontal bar: Tommy Ramos

===== Sailing =====
- Mixed Hobie Cat 16: Enrique Figueroa and Carla Malatrasi

=== Silver ===
===== Athletics =====
- Men's decathlon: Luiggy Llanos

===== Boxing =====
- Men's lightweight (60 kg): Alex de Jesús

===== Gymnastics =====
- Men's pommel horse: Luis Vargas

===== Tennis =====
- Women's doubles: Kristina Brandi and Vilmarie Castellvi

=== Bronze ===
===== Basketball =====
- Men's tournament: National team

- Rick Apodaca, Carlos Arroyo, Larry Ayuso, Sharif Fajardo, Bobby Joe Hatton, Antonio Latimer, Jorge Rivera, Daniel Santiago, Orlando Santiago, Alejandro Carmona, Peter John Ramos and Richie Dalmau

===== Beach volleyball =====
- Men's tournament: Ramón Hernández and Raúl Papaleo

===== Boxing =====
- Men's super heavyweight (+91 kg): Victor Bisbal

===== Fencing =====
- Men's épée individual: Víctor Bernier
- Men's épée team: Víctor Bernier, David Bernier, Jonathan Peña and Marcos Peña

===== Shooting =====
- Men's double trap: Lucas Bennazar

===== Taekwondo =====
- Men's 58 kg: Kristian Meléndez

===== Tennis =====
- Women's singles: Kristina Brandi

===== Wrestling =====
- Women's freestyle (63 kg): Mabel Fonseca

== Results by event ==
=== Athletics ===
Track

Athlete	Event	Heat		Final	
Athlete	Event	Time	Rank	Time	Rank
Yvonne Harrison	Women's 400 m hurdles	55.79	4	55.27	5
Alexander Greaux	Men's 3000 m steeplechase	—	—	DSQ	—

Road

Athlete	Event	Time	Rank
Maribel Burgos	Women's marathon	2:53:03	6
Lourdes Cruz	Women's marathon	3:04:12	11

Decathlon

Athlete	Decathlon										Total	
Athlete	1	2	3	4	5	6	7	8	9	10	Points	Rank
Luiggy Llanos	11.02	7.47	14.62	1.86	50.27	14.29	43.93	4.50	59.78	5:11.24	7704	2nd place, silver medalist(s)

=== Basketball ===
==== Men's tournament ====
- Rick Apodaca
- Carlos Arroyo
- Larry Ayuso
- Sharif Fajardo
- Bobby Joe Hatton
- Antonio Latimer
- Jorge Rivera
- Daniel Santiago
- Orlando Santiago
- Alejandro Carmona
- Peter John Ramos
- Richie Dalmau

Head coach:

- Unknown

=== Boxing ===
Athlete	Event	Round of 16	Quarterfinals	Semifinals	Final
Athlete	Event	Opposition Result	Opposition Result	Opposition Result	Opposition Result
Joseph Serrano	Light flyweight	Longpre (CAN); W 18–9	Tamara (COL); L 9–16	did not advance	
Carlos Valcárcel	Flyweight	Gamboa (CUB); L 13–26	did not advance		
Juan Manuel López	Bantamweight	González (GUA); W 27–10	Mares (MEX); L 21–24	did not advance	
Carlos Velasquez	Featherweight	Cermeño (VEN); W 12–5	Garcia (USA); L 10–+10	did not advance	
Alex de Jesús	Lightweight	Maicelo (PER); W 10–5	Décarie (CAN); W 13–4	Vargas (MEX); W 26–6	Kindelán (CUB); L 2–22 → (silver)
Miguel Almonte	Middleweight	O'Neil (GRN); W 18–10	Brand (COL); L RSC–4	did not advance	
Gerardo Bisbal	Heavyweight	Bye	Solis (CUB); L RSCH–2	did not advance	
Victor Bisbal	Super heavyweight	Bye	Cadieux (CAN); W 19–12	López Núñez (CUB); L 13–17 → (bronze)	did not advance

=== Swimming ===
==== Men's competitions ====
Athlete	Event	Heat		Final	
Athlete	Event	Time	Rank	Time	Rank
Ricardo Busquets	50 m freestyle	22.49	1	22.52	4
Maran Cruz	50 m freestyle	24.75	27	did not advance	
Ricardo Busquets	100 m freestyle	50.82	6	50.37	6
Maran Cruz	100 m freestyle	53.88	28	did not advance	

==== Women's competitions ====
Athlete	Event	Heat		Final	
Athlete	Event	Time	Rank	Time	Rank
Solimar Mojica	200 m freestyle	2:08.54	12	2:08.54	12
Vanessa Martínez	200 m freestyle	2:08.57	13	2:09.53	15
Sonia Álvarez	400 m freestyle	4:24.25	8	4:22.79	10
Solimar Mojica	400 m freestyle	4:37.42	14	4:34.60	14
Sonia Álvarez	800 m freestyle	—		9:03.48	8

== See also ==
- Puerto Rico at the 2002 Central American and Caribbean Games
- Puerto Rico at the 2004 Summer Olympics
