= Peru at the 2003 Pan American Games =

- IOC code: PER
- NOC: Comité Olímpico Peruano
- Website: www.coperu.org

in Santo Domingo 1–17 August 2003
- Medals Ranked 16th: Gold 1 Silver 1 Bronze 8 Total 10

Pan American Games appearances (overview)
- 1951; 1955; 1959; 1963; 1967; 1971; 1975; 1979; 1983; 1987; 1991; 1995; 1999; 2003; 2007; 2011; 2015; 2019; 2023

The 14th Pan American Games were held in Santo Domingo, Dominican Republic from August 1 to August 17, 2003.

== Medals ==
=== Gold ===
===== Karate =====
- Men's Kumite (– 62 kg): Alexis Carbajal

=== Silver ===
===== Karate =====
- Women's Kumite (– 58 kg): Molly Sánchez

=== Bronze ===
===== Badminton =====
- Women's Singles: Lorena Blanco
- Women's Singles: Sandra Jimeno
- Women's Doubles: Lorena Blanco and Valeria Rivera
- Women's Doubles: Sandra Jimeno and Doriana Rivera

===== Karate =====
- Men's Kata: Akio Tamashiro
- Men's Kumite (– 80 kg): Jorge Strohmeier

== Results by event ==
=== Athletics ===
Road

Athlete	Event	Time	Rank
Edwin Centeno	Men's 20 km race walk	1:39:16	9

Field

Athlete	Event	Throws						Total	
Athlete	Event	1	2	3	4	5	6	Distance	Rank
Eduardo Acuña	Men's Hammer	X	63.30	62.53	62.07	62.20	X	63.30 m	7

=== Boxing ===
Athlete	Event	Round of 16	Quarterfinals	Semifinals	Final
Athlete	Event	Opposition Result	Opposition Result	Opposition Result	Opposition Result
Carlos Zambrano	Bantamweight	Santos (BRA); L 3-10	did not advance		
Jonathan Maicelo	Lightweight	De Jesús (PUR); L 5-10	did not advance		

=== Swimming ===
==== Women's Competition ====
Athlete	Event	Heat		Final	
Athlete	Event	Time	Rank	Time	Rank
Maria Wong	200 m freestyle	2:11.29	16	2:11.00	16
Maria Wong	400 m freestyle	4:39.56	15	4:36.52	15
Karina Clavo	400 m freestyle	4:42.48	16	7:19.53	16
Karina Clavo	800 m freestyle	—		9:31.88	11

=== Triathlon ===
Athlete	Event	Race			Total	
Athlete	Event	Swim	Bike	Run	Time	Rank
Daniel de Montreuil	Men's Individual	22:01.900	1:01:39.500	49:22.500	02:14:14	31

== See also ==
- Peru at the 2004 Summer Olympics
