= Swimming at the 2003 Pan American Games =

Synchronized swimming at the 2003 Pan American Games

The Swimming competition at the 14th Pan American Games was held August 12–18, 2003 in Santo Domingo, Dominican Republic. The competition was held in the outdoor (50 m) pool of the Juan Pablo Duarte Olympic Center. It featured 32 long course (50 m) events (equally split between men and women).

Two swimmers won the first medals of their countries in swimming at Pan American Games at all times: Kristel Köbrich for Chile, and Gisela Morales for Guatemala.

== Results ==
=== Men's events ===
Event	Gold		Silver		Bronze	
50 m freestyle	Fernando Scherer; Brazil	22.40	José Meolans; Argentina	22.42	Gary Hall Jr. United States	22.43
100 m freestyle	José Meolans; Argentina	49.27	George Bovell; Trinidad and Tobago	49.61	Gustavo Borges; Brazil	49.90
200 m freestyle	George Bovell; Trinidad and Tobago	1:48.90	Dan Ketchum; United States	1:49.34	Rodrigo Castro; Brazil	1:49.55
400 m freestyle	Ricardo Monasterio; Venezuela	3:50.01	Fran Crippen; United States	3:52.62	Bruno Bonfim; Brazil	3:54.82
1500 m freestyle	Ricardo Monasterio; Venezuela	15:16.98	Fran Crippen; United States	15:19.63	Chris Thompson; United States	15:19.64
100 m backstroke	Peter Marshall; United States	55.52	George Bovell; Trinidad and Tobago	55.81	Jayme Cramer; United States	55.88
200 m backstroke	Rogério Romero; Brazil	1:59.92	Luke Wagner; United States	2:00.74	Joey Faltraco; United States	2:01.31
100 m breaststroke	Mark Gangloff; United States	1:00.95	Jarrod Marrs; United States	1:01.71	Eduardo Fischer; Brazil	1:01.88; SA
200 m breaststroke	Kyle Salyards; United States	2:13.37; GR	Sean Quinn; United States	2:15.77	Marcelo Tomazini; Brazil	2:15.87; SA
100 m butterfly	Ben Michaelson; United States	53.04	José Meolans; Argentina	53.28	Kaio de Almeida; Brazil	53.44; NR
200 m butterfly	Michael Raab; United States	1:57.33; GR	Kaio de Almeida; Brazil	1:58.10; NR	Pedro Monteiro; Brazil	1:59.38
200 m individual medley	George Bovell; Trinidad and Tobago	1:59.49	Thiago Pereira; Brazil	2:02.31; SA	Eric Donnelly; United States	2:02.52
400 m individual medley	Robert Margalis; United States	4:19.09	Eric Donnelly; United States	4:19.65	Thiago Pereira; Brazil	4:19.89
4 × 100 m freestyle relay	Brazil; Carlos Jayme; Gustavo Borges; Fernando Scherer; Jader Souza	3:18.66	Venezuela; Osvaldo Quevedo; Raymond Rosal; Luis Rojas; Octavio Alesi	3:23.14	Canada; Brian Edey; Chad Murray; Matt Rose; Colin Russell	3:23.83
4 × 200 m freestyle relay	United States; Dan Ketchum; Jeffrey Lee; Ryan Lochte; Bryan Goldberg	7:18.93	Brazil; Carlos Jayme; Rafael Mosca; Gustavo Borges; Rodrigo Castro	7:25.17	Canada; Scott Dickens; Brian Edey; Tobias Oriwol; Colin Russell	7:27.18
4 × 100 m medley relay	United States; Peter Marshall; Mark Gangloff; Ben Michaelson; Nick Brunelli	3:37.27; GR	Brazil; Paulo Machado; Eduardo Fischer; Kaio de Almeida; Gustavo Borges	3:40.02; SA	Canada; Sean Sepulis; Scott Dickens; Chad Murray; Matt Rose	3:40.12

=== Women's events ===
Event	Gold		Silver		Bronze	
50 m freestyle	Kara Lynn Joyce; United States	25.24	Flávia Delaroli; Brazil	25.44	Eileen Coparropa; Panama	25.62
100 m freestyle	Courtney Shealy; United States	55.61	Christina Swindle; United States; Florencia Szigeti; Argentina	55.92	none	
200 m freestyle	Dana Vollmer; United States	1:59.80	Colleen Lanné; United States	2:01.98	Mariana Brochado; Brazil	2:02.08
400 m freestyle	Elizabeth Hill; United States	4:10.18; GR	Morgan Hentzen; United States	4:13.03	Monique Ferreira; Brazil	4:14.21
800 m freestyle	Morgan Hentzen; United States	8:36.54	Rachael Burke; United States	8:37.61	Kristel Köbrich; Chile	8:43.90
100 m backstroke	Diana MacManus; United States	1:02.50	Courtney Shealy; United States	1:02.74	Gisela Morales; Guatemala	1:04.56
200 m backstroke	Jamie Reid; United States	2:13.89	Diana MacManus; United States	2:15.39	Gisela Morales; Guatemala	2:16.19
100 m breaststroke	Staciana Stitts; United States	1:09.01	Corrie Clark; United States	1:10.09	Kathleen Stoody; Canada	1:10.56
200 m breaststroke	Alexi Spann; United States	2:29.76	Lisa Blackburn; Canada	2:31.52	Kathleen Stoody; Canada	2:31.93
100 m butterfly	Bethany Goodwin; United States	59.97	Audrey Lacroix; Canada	1:00.18	Dana Kirk; United States	1:00.51
200 m butterfly	Audrey Lacroix; Canada	2:11.02	Noelle Bassi; United States	2:12.81	Dana Kirk; United States	2:12.85
200 m individual medley	Joanne Malar; Canada	2:15.93	Corrie Clark; United States	2:16.78	Laura Davis; United States	2:17.33
400 m individual medley	Georgina Bardach; Argentina	4:43.40	Kristen Caverly; United States	4:46.18	Joanna Maranhão; Brazil	4:46.38
4 × 100 m freestyle relay	United States; Amanda Weir; Christina Swindle; Colleen Lanné; Courtney Shealy	3:41.93; GR	Canada; Audrey Lacroix; Elizabeth Collins; Joanne Malar; Kelly Moody	3:46.65	Brazil; Flávia Delaroli; Rebeca Gusmão; Monique Ferreira; Tatiana Lemos	3:47.05
4 × 200 m freestyle relay	United States; Elizabeth Hill; Colleen Lanné; Carly Piper; Dana Vollmer	8:05.47; GR	Brazil; Ana Muniz; Paula Ribeiro; Mariana Brochado; Monique Ferreira	8:10.54; SA	Canada; Joanne Malar; Maya Beaudry; Elizabeth Collins; Kelly Doody	8:10.85
4 × 100 m medley relay	United States; Diana MacManus; Staciana Stitts; Dana Vollmer; Amanda Weir	4:05.92	Canada; Joanne Malar; Kathleen Stoody; Audrey Lacroix; Elizabeth Collins	4:13.72	Mexico; Danielle de Alba; Adriana Marmolejo; Atenas Lopez; Alejandra Galan	4:18.04

== Medal standings ==
Rank	Nation	Gold	Silver	Bronze	Total
1	United States	21	17	8	46
2	Brazil	3	6	12	21
3	Canada	2	4	6	12
4	Argentina	2	3	0	5
5	Trinidad and Tobago	2	2	0	4
6	Venezuela	2	1	0	3
7	Guatemala	0	0	2	2
8	Chile	0	0	1	1
8	Mexico	0	0	1	1
8	Panama	0	0	1	1
Totals (10 entries)		32	33	31	96
