= Brazil at the 2003 Pan American Games =

- IOC code: BRA
- NOC: Brazilian Olympic Committee
- Website: www.cob.org.br

in Santo Domingo 1–17 August 2003
- Competitors: 467
- Flag bearer: Mauricio Lima
- Medals Ranked 4th: Gold 29 Silver 40 Bronze 54 Total 123

Pan American Games appearances (overview)
- 1951; 1955; 1959; 1963; 1967; 1971; 1975; 1979; 1983; 1987; 1991; 1995; 1999; 2003; 2007; 2011; 2015; 2019; 2023

Brazil competed at the 2003 Pan American Games, held in Santo Domingo, Dominican Republic, from 1 to 17 August 2003.

== Medalists ==
The following competitors from Brazil won medals at the games. In the by discipline sections below, medalists' names are bolded.

Medal	Name	Sport	Event	Date
1st place, gold medalist(s)	Hudson de Souza	Athletics	Men's 5000 metres	5 August
1st place, gold medalist(s)	Brazil men's national basketball team	Basketball	Men's tournament	7 August
1st place, gold medalist(s)	Hugo Hoyama; Thiago Monteiro	Table tennis	Men's doubles	8 August
1st place, gold medalist(s)	Márcia Narloch	Athletics	Women's marathon	9 August
1st place, gold medalist(s)	Vanderlei de Lima	Athletics	Men's marathon	9 August
1st place, gold medalist(s)	Joana Cortez; Bruna Colósio	Tennis	Women's Doubles	9 August
1st place, gold medalist(s)	Robert Scheidt	Sailing	Men's Laser class	9 August
1st place, gold medalist(s)	Ricardo Santos	Sailing	Men's sailboard	9 August
1st place, gold medalist(s)	Dayane Camillo; Thalita Nakadomari; Ana Maria Maciel; Gabriela Andrioli; Fernanda Cavalieri; Natália Eidt	Gymnastics	Women's rhythmic group all-around	9 August
1st place, gold medalist(s)	Hudson de Souza	Athletics	Men's 1500 metres	9 August
1st place, gold medalist(s)	Vicente de Lima; Édson Ribeiro; André da Silva; Claudinei da Silva	Athletics	Men's 4 × 100 metres relay	9 August
1st place, gold medalist(s)	Fernando Meligeni	Tennis	Men's Singles	10 August
1st place, gold medalist(s)	Bruno Amorim; Dante Bianchi	Sailing	Snipe class	10 August
1st place, gold medalist(s)	Dayane Camillo; Thalita Nakadomari; Ana Maria Maciel; Gabriela Andrioli; Fernanda Cavalieri; Natália Eidt	Gymnastics	Women's rhythmic group ribbons	10 August
1st place, gold medalist(s)	Dayane Camillo; Thalita Nakadomari; Ana Maria Maciel; Gabriela Andrioli; Fernanda Cavalieri; Natália Eidt	Gymnastics	Women's rhythmic group hoops + balls	10 August
1st place, gold medalist(s)	Luiz Camilo Jr	Judo	Men's 73 kg	10 August
1st place, gold medalist(s)	Flávio Canto	Judo	Men's 81 kg	10 August
1st place, gold medalist(s)	Brazil men's national handball team	Handball	Men's tournament	11 August
1st place, gold medalist(s)	Edinanci Silva	Judo	Women's 78 kg	11 August
1st place, gold medalist(s)	Mário Sabino	Judo	Men's 100 kg	11 August
1st place, gold medalist(s)	Daniel Hernandes	Judo	Men's +100 kg	12 August
1st place, gold medalist(s)	Lucélia Ribeiro	Karate	Women's 58 kg	12 August
1st place, gold medalist(s)	Brazil women's national handball team	Handball	Women's tournament	12 August
1st place, gold medalist(s)	Marcel Sturmer	Roller sports	Men's free skating	13 August
1st place, gold medalist(s)	Rogério Romero	Swimming	Men's 200 metre backstroke	14 August
1st place, gold medalist(s)	Brazil women's national football team	Football	Women's tournament	15 August
1st place, gold medalist(s)	Carlos Jayme; Gustavo Borges; Fernando Scherer; Jader Souza	Swimming	Men's 4 × 100 metre freestyle relay	15 August
1st place, gold medalist(s)	Carlos Campos; Fábio Demarchi	Canoeing	Men's K-2 500 metres	16 August
1st place, gold medalist(s)	Fernando Scherer	Swimming	Men's 50 metre freestyle	16 August
2nd place, silver medalist(s)	Danilo Nogueira; Diego Hypólito; Michel Conceição; Mosiah Rodrigues; Victor Rosa; Vitor Camargo	Gymnastics	Men's artistic team all-around	2 August
2nd place, silver medalist(s)	Rodrigo Bastos	Shooting	Men's trap	3 August
2nd place, silver medalist(s)	Michel Conceição	Gymnastics	Men's floor	5 August
2nd place, silver medalist(s)	Diego Hypólito	Gymnastics	Men's vault	5 August
2nd place, silver medalist(s)	Daniele Hypólito	Gymnastics	Women's uneven bars	5 August
2nd place, silver medalist(s)	Daniele Hypólito	Gymnastics	Women's balance beam	5 August
2nd place, silver medalist(s)	Osmar dos Santos	Athletics	Men's 800 metres	6 August
2nd place, silver medalist(s)	Juliana Veloso	Diving	Women's 10 metre platform	6 August
2nd place, silver medalist(s)	Elisângela Adriano	Athletics	Women's shot put	7 August
2nd place, silver medalist(s)	Marílson dos Santos	Athletics	Men's 10,000 metres	7 August
2nd place, silver medalist(s)	Alexandre Soares; Gibran Cunha	Rowing	Men's coxless pair-oared shells	8 August
2nd place, silver medalist(s)	Mário dos Santos	Athletics	Men's 50 kilometres walk	8 August
2nd place, silver medalist(s)	Jadel Gregório	Athletics	Men's triple jump	8 August
2nd place, silver medalist(s)	Antoine Jaoude	Wrestling	Men's Freestyle 96 kg	8 August
2nd place, silver medalist(s)	Gustavo Tsuboi; Bruno Anjos	Table tennis	Men's doubles	8 August
2nd place, silver medalist(s)	José Carlos Sobral; Thiago Gomes	Rowing	Men's lightweight double sculls	9 August
2nd place, silver medalist(s)	Anderson Nocetti; Marcelus dos Santos	Rowing	Men's double sculls	9 August
2nd place, silver medalist(s)	Luizão Correa; Paulo Emilio Silva	Beach volleyball	Men's tournament	9 August
2nd place, silver medalist(s)	Cassius Duran	Diving	Men's 10 metre platform	9 August
2nd place, silver medalist(s)	Edvandro Cruz	Cycling	Men's cross-country	10 August
2nd place, silver medalist(s)	Rui Valle; Gustavo Santos; João Borges; Ronaldo Vargas	Rowing	Men's Lightweight quadruple sculls	10 August
2nd place, silver medalist(s)	Virgílio de Castilho	Triathlon	Men's	10 August
2nd place, silver medalist(s)	Maurício Santa Cruz; João Carlos Jordão; Alan Adler; Daniel Santiago	Sailing	Snipe J/24 class	10 August
2nd place, silver medalist(s)	Brazil men's national water polo team	Water polo	Men's tournament	10 August
2nd place, silver medalist(s)	Vania Ishii	Judo	Women's 63 kg	10 August
2nd place, silver medalist(s)	Samantha Harvey	Modern pentathlon	Women's individual	11 August
2nd place, silver medalist(s)	Nelson Sardenberg	Karate	Men's 80 kg	12 August
2nd place, silver medalist(s)	Ana Muniz; Paula Ribeiro; Mariana Brochado; Monique Ferreira	Swimming	Women's 4 × 200 metre freestyle relay	12 August
2nd place, silver medalist(s)	Carlos Jayme; Rafael Mósca; Gustavo Borges; Rodrigo Castro	Swimming	Men's 4 × 200 metre freestyle relay	13 August
2nd place, silver medalist(s)	Thiago Monteiro	Table tennis	Men's singles	13 August
2nd place, silver medalist(s)	Sebastian Cuattrin	Canoeing	Men's K-1 1000 metres	15 August
2nd place, silver medalist(s)	Sebastian Szubski; Carlos Campos; André Caye; Sebastian Cuattrin	Canoeing	Men's K-4 1000 metres	15 August
2nd place, silver medalist(s)	Brazil men's national football team	Football	Men's tournament	15 August
2nd place, silver medalist(s)	Rafael Alarçón; Ronivaldo Conceição; Luciano Barbosa	Squash	Men's team	15 August
2nd place, silver medalist(s)	Janildes Fernandes	Cycling	Women's Road Race	16 August
2nd place, silver medalist(s)	Sebastian Cuattrin	Canoeing	Men's K-1 500 metres	16 August
2nd place, silver medalist(s)	Kaio Almeida	Swimming	Men's 200 metre butterfly	16 August
2nd place, silver medalist(s)	Thiago Pereira	Swimming	Men's 200 metre individual medley	17 August
2nd place, silver medalist(s)	Flávia Delaroli	Swimming	Women's 50 metre freestyle	17 August
2nd place, silver medalist(s)	Paulo Machado; Eduardo Fischer; Kaio Almeida; Gustavo Borges	Swimming	Men's 4 × 100 metre medley relay	17 August
3rd place, bronze medalist(s)	Ana Paula Rodrigues; Camila Comin; Caroline Molinari; Daiane dos Santos; Daniele Hypólito; Laís Souza	Gymnastics	Women's artistic team all-around	2 August
3rd place, bronze medalist(s)	Fabio Coelho	Shooting	Men's 10 metre air rifle	4 August
3rd place, bronze medalist(s)	Janice Teixeira	Shooting	Women´s trap	4 August
3rd place, bronze medalist(s)	Daniele Hypólito	Gymnastics	Women's artistic individual all-around	4 August
3rd place, bronze medalist(s)	Mosiah Rodrigues	Gymnastics	Men's pommel horse	5 August
3rd place, bronze medalist(s)	Michel Conceição	Gymnastics	Men's vault	5 August
3rd place, bronze medalist(s)	Mosiah Rodrigues	Gymnastics	Men's horizontal bar	5 August
3rd place, bronze medalist(s)	Marilson dos Santos	Athletics	Men's 5000 metres	5 August
3rd place, bronze medalist(s)	Christiane dos Santos	Athletics	Women's 800 metres	6 August
3rd place, bronze medalist(s)	Fabiano Peçanha	Athletics	Men's 800 metres	6 August
3rd place, bronze medalist(s)	André da Silva	Athletics	Men's 200 metres	8 August
3rd place, bronze medalist(s)	Brazil women's national basketball team	Basketball	Women's tournament	8 August
3rd place, bronze medalist(s)	Juliana Veloso	Diving	Women's 3 metre springboard	8 August
3rd place, bronze medalist(s)	Alexandre Soares; Gibran Cunha; Oswaldo Kuster Neto; Claudiomar Iung	Rowing	Men's coxless four-oared shells	9 August
3rd place, bronze medalist(s)	Larissa França; Ana Richa	Beach volleyball	Women's tournament	9 August
3rd place, bronze medalist(s)	Márcio de Souza	Athletics	Men's 110 metres hurdles	9 August
3rd place, bronze medalist(s)	Maria Laura Almirão; Josiane Tito; Geisa Coutinho; Lucimar Teodoro	Athletics	Women's 4 × 400 metres relay	9 August
3rd place, bronze medalist(s)	Fabiane Hukuda	Judo	Women's 52 kg	9 August
3rd place, bronze medalist(s)	Henrique Guimarães	Judo	Men's 66 kg	9 August
3rd place, bronze medalist(s)	Anderson Nocetti; Marcelus dos Santos; Allan Bittencourt; Leandro Tozzo	Rowing	Men's quadruple sculls	10 August
3rd place, bronze medalist(s)	Brazil women's national water polo team	Water polo	Women's tournament	10 August
3rd place, bronze medalist(s)	Tayanne Mantovaneli	Gymnastics	Women's rhythmic individual clubs	10 August
3rd place, bronze medalist(s)	Tânia Ferreira	Judo	Women's 57 kg	10 August
3rd place, bronze medalist(s)	Cíntia Lassalvia	Karate	Women's individual kata	11 August
3rd place, bronze medalist(s)	Jurandir Andrade	Karate	Men's individual kata	11 August
3rd place, bronze medalist(s)	Carlos Honorato	Judo	Men's 90 kg	11 August
3rd place, bronze medalist(s)	Rodrigo Castro	Swimming	Men's 200 metre freestyle	11 August
3rd place, bronze medalist(s)	Ronivaldo Conceição	Squash	Men's singles	11 August
3rd place, bronze medalist(s)	Sidirley Souza	Karate	Men's 62 kg	12 August
3rd place, bronze medalist(s)	Emmanuel Santana	Karate	Men's 74kg	12 August
3rd place, bronze medalist(s)	Eduardo Fischer	Swimming	Men's 100 metre breaststroke	12 August
3rd place, bronze medalist(s)	Joanna Maranhão	Swimming	Women's 400 metre individual medley	12 August
3rd place, bronze medalist(s)	Mayra Ramos	Roller sports	Women's free skating	12 August
3rd place, bronze medalist(s)	Hugo Hoyama	Table tennis	Men's singles	13 August
3rd place, bronze medalist(s)	James Pereira	Boxing	Men's 51 kg	13 August
3rd place, bronze medalist(s)	Marcos Costa	Boxing	Men's 64 kg	13 August
3rd place, bronze medalist(s)	Kaio Almeida	Swimming	Men's 100 metre butterfly	13 August
3rd place, bronze medalist(s)	Thiago Pereira	Swimming	Men's 400 metre individual medley	13 August
3rd place, bronze medalist(s)	Mariana Brochado	Swimming	Women's 200 metre freestyle	13 August
3rd place, bronze medalist(s)	Álvaro de Miranda Neto; Bernardo Alves; Karina Johannpeter; César Almeida	Equestrian	Team jumping	14 August
3rd place, bronze medalist(s)	Karen Redfern; Flávia Roberts; Patrícia Pamplona	Squash	Women's team	14 August
3rd place, bronze medalist(s)	Carolina Moraes; Isabela Moraes	Synchronized swimming	Women's duet	14 August
3rd place, bronze medalist(s)	Diogo Silva	Taekwondo	Men's 68 kg	14 August
3rd place, bronze medalist(s)	Gustavo Borges	Swimming	Men's 100 metre freestyle	14 August
3rd place, bronze medalist(s)	Monique Ferreira	Swimming	Women's 400 metre freestyle	14 August
3rd place, bronze medalist(s)	Flávia Delaroli; Rebeca Gusmão; Monique Ferreira; Tatiana Lemos	Swimming	Women's 4 × 100 metre freestyle relay	14 August
3rd place, bronze medalist(s)	Brazil national roller hockey team	Roller sports	Roller hockey	14 August
3rd place, bronze medalist(s)	Roger Caumo; Fábio Demarchi	Canoeing	Men's K-2 1000 metres	15 August
3rd place, bronze medalist(s)	Roberta Fernandes; Gláucia Souza; Carolina Moraes; Isabela Moraes; Caroline Hildebrandt; Beatriz Leite; Camile Oliveira; Ludmilla Silva; Mariana Vigneron	Synchronized swimming	Women's team	15 August
3rd place, bronze medalist(s)	Bruno Bonfim	Swimming	Men's 400 metre freestyle	15 August
3rd place, bronze medalist(s)	Marcelo Tomazini	Swimming	Men's 200 metre breaststroke	15 August
3rd place, bronze medalist(s)	Brazil men's national volleyball team	Volleyball	Men's tournament	15 August
3rd place, bronze medalist(s)	Wallassi Aires	Taekwondo	Men's +80 kg	16 August
3rd place, bronze medalist(s)	Pedro Monteiro	Swimming	Men's 200 metre butterfly	16 August

**Medals by sport**
**Sport**	1st place, gold medalist(s)	2nd place, silver medalist(s)	3rd place, bronze medalist(s)	Total
Athletics	5	5	6	16
Judo	5	1	4	10
Swimming	3	6	12	21
Gymnastics	3	5	6	14
Sailing	3	1	0	4
Handball	2	0	0	2
Tennis	2	0	0	2
Canoeing	1	3	1	5
Table tennis	1	2	1	4
Karate	1	1	4	6
Football	1	1	0	2
Roller sports	1	0	2	2
Basketball	1	0	1	2
Rowing	0	4	2	6
Diving	0	2	1	3
Cycling	0	2	0	2
Shooting	0	1	2	3
Squash	0	1	2	3
Water polo	0	1	1	2
Beach volleyball	0	1	1	2
Triathlon	0	1	0	1
Modern pentathlon	0	1	0	1
Wrestling	0	1	0	1
Synchronized swimming	0	0	2	2
Taekwondo	0	0	2	2
Boxing	0	0	2	2
Volleyball	0	0	1	1
Equestrian	0	0	1	1
**Total**	**29**	**40**	**54**	123

**Medals by day**
**Day**	1st place, gold medalist(s)	2nd place, silver medalist(s)	3rd place, bronze medalist(s)	**Total**
August 2	0	1	1	2
August 3	0	1	0	5
August 4	0	0	3	14
August 5	1	4	4	9
August 6	0	2	2	4
August 7	1	2	0	3
August 8	1	5	3	9
August 9	8	4	6	18
August 10	6	6	4	16
August 11	3	1	5	11
August 12	3	2	5	10
August 13	1	2	6	9
August 14	1	0	8	9
August 15	2	4	5	11
August 16	2	3	2	7
August 17	0	3	0	3
**Total**	**29**	**40**	**54**	**123**

**Medals by gender**
**Gender**	1st place, gold medalist(s)	2nd place, silver medalist(s)	3rd place, bronze medalist(s)	**Total**
Male	20	31	32	83
Female	9	9	21	39
Mixed	0	0	1	1
**Total**	**29**	**40**	**54**	**123**

== Results by event ==
=== Athletics ===
Track

Athlete	Event	Heat		Final	
Athlete	Event	Time	Rank	Time	Rank
Édson Ribeiro	Men's 100 m	10.39	3	10.31	4
Jarbas Mascarenhas	Men's 100 m	10.57	6	10.34	5
Luciana Mendes	Women's 1500 m	—	—	4:21.80	8
Marílson dos Santos	Men's 10000 m	—	—	28:49.48	2nd place, silver medalist(s)
Eronilde de Araújo	Men's 400 m hurdles	50.21	6	51.19	8
Lucimar Teodoro	Women's 400 m hurdles	56.33	7	57.56	8
Perla dos Santos	Women's 400 m hurdles	1:00.28	12	—	12

Road

Athlete	Event	Time	Rank
Vanderlei de Lima	Men's marathon	2:19:08	1st place, gold medalist(s)
Genílson da Silva	Men's marathon	DNF	—
Márcia Narloch	Women's marathon	2:39:54	1st place, gold medalist(s)
Maria do Carmo Guimarães	Women's marathon	2:51:58	5
José Alessandro Bagio	Men's 20 km race walk	DSQ	—
Mário dos Santos	Men's 50 km race walk	4:07:37	2nd place, silver medalist(s)
Sérgio Galdino	Men's 50 km race walk	4:24:42	4

Field

Athlete	Event	Throws						Total	
Athlete	Event	1	2	3	4	5	6	Distance	Rank
Luiz Fernando da Silva	Men's javelin throw	73.27	73.00	72.12	73.13	68.83	73.86	73.86 m	4
Elisângela Adriano	Women's discus throw	56.58	58.80	57.72	58.17	55.79	X	58.80 m	5
Elisângela Adriano	Women's shot put	18.48	X	18.27	X	X	X	18.48 m	2nd place, silver medalist(s)

=== Basketball ===
==== Men's tournament ====
- Marcelinho Machado
- Arnaldinho Filho
- Dede Barbosa
- Valtinho Silva
- Murilo da Rosa
- Demétrius Ferraciu
- Alex Garcia
- Anderson Varejão
- Guilherme Giovannoni
- Tiago Splitter
- André Pereira
- Renato Pinto

Head coach:

- Lula Ferreira

=== Boxing ===
Athlete	Event	Round of 16	Quarterfinals	Semifinals	Final
Athlete	Event	Opposition Result	Opposition Result	Opposition Result	Opposition Result
Giliard Silva	Light flyweight	Whitfield (USA); L 17–39	Did not advance		
James Pereira	Flyweight	Bye	Gauthier (CAN); W 20–16	Payano (DOM); L 10–19 → (bronze)	Did not advance
Cleber Santos	Bantamweight	Zambrano (PER); W 10–3	Pérez (COL); L 26–27	Did not advance	
Edvaldo Oliveira	Featherweight	Ramos Concha (COL); L 10–12	Did not advance		
Alessandro Matos	Lightweight	Kindelán (CUB); L 3–7	Did not advance		
Marcos Costa	Light welterweight	Bye	Luna (CUB); W 28–17	Mosquea (DOM); L 17–19 → (bronze)	Did not advance
Erivan Conceição	Welterweight	Trupish (CAN); L 9–10	Did not advance		
Joilson Santos	Middleweight	Pascal (CAN); L 21–22	Did not advance		
Washington Silva	Light heavyweight	Bye	Casimiro (DOM); L RSC–3	Did not advance	
Alexsandro Cardoso	Heavyweight	Bye	Vargas (USA); L RSC–4	Did not advance	
Rafael Zumbano	Super heavyweight	Bye	Ceballos (ARG); L 12–17	Did not advance	

=== Swimming ===
==== Men's competitions ====
Athlete	Event	Heat		Final	
Athlete	Event	Time	Rank	Time	Rank
Fernando Scherer	50 m freestyle	22.55	3	22.40	1st place, gold medalist(s)
Jader Souza	50 m freestyle	22.79	5	22.80	6
Gustavo Borges	100 m freestyle	50.59	4	49.90	3rd place, bronze medalist(s)
Jader Souza	100 m freestyle	51.13	8	50.24	5

==== Women's competitions ====
Athlete	Event	Heat		Final	
Athlete	Event	Time	Rank	Time	Rank
Mariana Brochado	200 m freestyle	2:04.97	7	2:02.08	3rd place, bronze medalist(s)
Monique Ferreira	200 m freestyle	2:04.85	6	2:02.26	4
Monique Ferreira	400 m freestyle	4:19.72	5	4:14.21	3rd place, bronze medalist(s)
Mariana Brochado	400 m freestyle	4:21.04	7	4:17.73	6
Nayara Ribeiro	800 m freestyle	—		8:53.64	5
Ana Muniz	800 m freestyle	—		9:00.42	6

=== Triathlon ===
Athlete	Event	Race			Total	
Athlete	Event	Swim	Bike	Run	Time	Rank
Vigilio de Castilho	Men's individual	19:56.300	57:48.100	34:12.300	01:52:50	2nd place, silver medalist(s)
Paulo Miyashiro	Men's individual	19:32.900	58:11.300	35:39.300	01:54:01	6
Leandro Macedo	Men's individual	20:51.800	58:43.400	34:20.800	01:54:55	9
Carla Moreno	Women's individual	18:49.800	1:05:06.600	37:55.100	02:01:51	4
Sandra Soldan	Women's individual	18:49.700	1:05:10.800	38:14.000	02:02:14	5
Mariana Ohata	Women's individual	19:52.500	1:04:04.500	39:18.000	02:03:15	6

== See also ==
- Brazil at the 2004 Summer Olympics
