= Venues of the 2003 Pan American Games =

Sports venues in Dominican Republic

The 2003 Pan American Games were held in Santo Domingo, Dominican Republic and surrounding area. The Pan American Games ran from in July and August 2003.

This is a list of competition venues that were used during the games. 34 Venues will be used, with a majority of them being built for the games.

== Olympic Park Cluster ==
Venue	Sports	Capacity	Ref.
Palacio de los Deportes Virgilio Travieso Soto	Basketball	9,000	
Softball Stadium	Softball	5,000	
Olympic Velodrome - Juan Pablo Duarte Olympic Center	Cycling (track)	2,000	
Olympic Stadium	Athletics; Ceremonies; Football	35,000	
Judo Pavilion	Fencing; Judo	2,000	
Aquatics Center - Juan Pablo Duarte Olympic Center	Diving; Swimming; Synchronized swimming Water polo	4,000	
Combat Pavilion	Karate; Taekwondo; Wrestling	2,500	
Volleyball Pavilion	Volleyball	5,000	
Road cycling circuit	Cycling (road)	10,000	
Racquetball Pavilion	Racquetball	600	
Olympic Stadium Basque Pelota	Basque pelota	400	

== East Park Cluster ==
Venue	Sports	Capacity	Ref.
Tennis Center	Tennis	3,600	
Handball Hall	Handball	2,000	
Weightlifting Pavilion	Weightlifting	2,000	
Estadio Parque del Este	Football	2,000	
Table Tennis Center	Table tennis	2,300	
Gymnastic Pavilion	Gymnastics (Artistic and Rhythmic)	3,000	
Parque del Este Hockey Stadium	Field hockey	2,000	
Archery field - East Park	Archery	500	

== Venues elsewhere in Santo Domingo ==
Venue	Sports	Capacity	Ref.
UASD Pavilion	Badminton	2,000	
Estadio Quisqueya	Baseball	16,500	
Sebelen Bowling Center	Bowling	800	
Carlos Teo Cruz Coliseum	Boxing	7,000	
Isabela River	Water skiing	600	
Mauricio Baez Club	Roller skating	4,000	
Feria Ganadera	Modern pentathlon Volleyball (beach)	2,000	
Sans Souci Shooting Center	Shooting	2,000	
Sans Souci	Triathlon	5,000	
Body Shop - Plaza Naco	Squash	800	

== Venues outside of Santo Domingo ==
Venue	Sports	Capacity	City	Ref.
Estadio Panamericano, San Cristóbal	Football	2,800	San Cristóbal	
Centro de Remo y Canotaje Presa de Rincón	Canoeing (sprint); Rowing	800	Sabana del Puerto	
Club Nautico	Sailing	2,000	Boca Chica	
Mountain Bike Center	Cycling (Mountain biking)	2,000	Jarabacoa	
Palmarejo Equestrian Center	Equestrian (Dressage and Jumping)	600	-	
