= Swimming at the 2003 Pan American Games – Women's 4 × 200 metre freestyle relay =

The Women's 4x200m Freestyle Relay event at the 2003 Pan American Games took place on August 12, 2003 (Day 11 of the Games). There were only six entries and therefore no preliminary heats for this event.

== Medalists ==
Gold	Elizabeth Hill; Colleen Lanné; Carly Piper; Dana Vollmer; United States
Silver	Ana Muniz; Paula Ribeiro; Mariana Brochado; Monique Ferreira; Brazil
Bronze	Joanne Malar-Moreale; Maya Beaudry; Elizabeth Collins; Kelly Doody; Canada

== Results ==
Place	Nation	Swimmers	Final Time
1	United States	♦ Elizabeth Hill ♦ Colleen Lanné ♦ Carly Piper ♦ Dana Vollmer	8:05.47 GR
2	Brazil	♦ Ana Muniz ♦ Paula Ribeiro ♦ Mariana Brochado ♦ Monique Ferreira	8:10.54 SA
3	Canada	♦ Joanne Malar-Moreale ♦ Maya Beaudry ♦ Elizabeth Collins ♦ Kelly Doody	8:10.85
4	Mexico	♦ ♦ ♦ ♦	8:36.07
5	Puerto Rico	♦ ♦ ♦ ♦	8:38.89
6	Peru	♦ ♦ ♦ ♦	9:10.03
