= Swimming at the 2003 Pan American Games – Men's 400 metre freestyle =

The Men's 400 meter freestyle event at the 2003 Pan American Games took place on August 15, 2003 (Day 15 of the Games).

== Medalists ==
Gold	Ricardo Monasterio; Venezuela
Silver	Fran Crippen; United States
Bronze	Bruno Bonfim; Brazil

== Records ==
Record	Athlete	Time	Date	Venue
World Record	Ian Thorpe (AUS)	3:40.08	2002-07-30	Manchester, United Kingdom
Pan Am Record	Sean Killion (USA)	3:50.38	1991-08-16	Havana, Cuba

== Results ==
Place	Swimmer	Heats		Final
Place	Swimmer	Time	Rank	Time
1	Ricardo Monasterio (VEN)	3:54.12	2	3:50.01
2	Fran Crippen (USA)	3:52.66	1	3:52.62
3	Bruno Bonfim (BRA)	3:58.84	5	3:54.82
4	Felipe Araujo (BRA)	3:56.69	3	3:56.64
5	Giancarlo Zolezzi (CHI)	3:58.46	4	3:57.89
6	Davis Tarwater (USA)	3:59.15	6	3:58.57
7	Colin Russell (CAN)	4:01.79	8	4:01.86
8	Leonardo Salinas (MEX)	3:59.38	7	4:03.10
9	Tobias Oriwol (CAN)	4:02.00	9	4:01.41
10	Carlos Cánepa (PER)	4:07.87	11	4:05.03
11	Shaune Fraser (CAY)	4:08.53	12	4:08.20
12	Roberto Penaillo (CHI)	4:14.60	15	4:09.20
13	Carlos Meléndez (ESA)	4:10.75	13	4:10.16
14	Jorge Rodríguez (DOM)	4:11.82	14	4:10.81
15	Jonathan Mauri (CRC)	4:15.74	16	4:15.44
16	Vincent van Rutten (AHO)	4:16.14	17	4:17.18
18	Omar Núñez (NCA)	4:20.83	18	
—	Andres Jiménez (MEX)	4:03.92	10	DNS
