= Swimming at the 2003 Pan American Games – Men's 200 metre butterfly =

The Men's 200m Butterfly event at the 2003 Pan American Games took place on August 16, 2003 (Day 15 of the Games).

== Medalists ==
Gold	Michael Raab; United States
Silver	Kaio Almeida; Brazil
Bronze	Pedro Monteiro; Brazil

== Records ==
Record	Athlete	Time	Date	Venue
World Record	Michael Phelps (USA)	1:53.93	2003-07-22	Barcelona, Spain
Pan Am Record	Shamek Pietucha (CAN)	1:58.50	1999-08-06	Winnipeg, Canada

== Results ==
Place	Swimmer	Heats		Final
Place	Swimmer	Time	Rank	Time
1	Michael Raab (USA)	1:57.54 GR	1	1:57.33 GR
2	Kaio Almeida (BRA)	2:02.27	6	1:58.10 NR
3	Pedro Monteiro (BRA)	1:59.93	2	1:59.38
4	Jeremy Knowles (BAH)	2:02.89	7	1:59.82
5	Eric Donnelly (USA)	2:01.03	5	2:00.04
6	Andrew Livingston (PUR)	2:00.84	4	2:00.05
7	Juan Valdivieso (PER)	2:00.15	3	2:00.62
8	Chad Murray (CAN)	2:04.32	9	2:04.93
9	Sergio Cabrera (PAR)	2:04.60	10	2:04.54
10	Shaune Fraser (CAY)	2:08.31	13	2:04.82
11	Devin Saez (ESA)	2:07.68	11	2:06.00
12	José Rodríguez (DOM)	2:09.33	17	2:07.96
13	William Muriel (ECU)	2:08.24	12	2:08.00
14	Matthew Houllier (TRI)	2:09.09	16	2:08.39
15	Carlos Meléndez (ESA)	2:09.04	15	2:08.62
16	Marcos Burgos (CHI)	2:09.00	14	2:08.64
17	Sergio de Léon (GUA)	2:09.51	18	
18	Roy Barahona (HON)	2:09.91	19	
19	Travano McPhee (BAH)	2:11.78	20	
20	Omar Núñez (NCA)	2:12.11	21	
21	Timothy Wong (JAM)	2:12.16	22	
—	Josh Ilika (MEX)	2:03.04	8	scratched
