= Athletics at the 2003 Pan American Games – Men's 200 metres =

Men's 200 metres at the Pan American Games

The final of the Men's 200 metres event at the 2003 Pan American Games took place on Friday August 8, 2003, with the heats and the semifinals staged a day earlier.

== Medalists ==
Gold	Kenneth Brokenburr; United States
Silver	Christopher Williams; Jamaica
Bronze	André da Silva; Brazil

== Records ==
World Record	Michael Johnson (USA)	19.32 s	August 1, 1996	Atlanta, United States
Pan Am Record	Don Quarrie (JAM)	19.86 s	August 3, 1971	Cali, Colombia

== Results ==
Rank	Athlete	Heats		Semis		Final
Rank	Athlete	Time	Rank	Time	Rank	Time
1	Kenneth Brokenburr (USA)	20.66	1	20.43	1	20.42
2	Christopher Williams (JAM)	20.90	3	20.71	3	20.54
3	André da Silva (BRA)	20.83	2	20.70	2	20.68
4	Clement Campbell (JAM)			20.89	5	20.85
5	Héber Viera (URU)			20.84	4	20.85
6	Julien Raeburn (TRI)	21.13	7	21.02	8	20.93
7	Claudinei da Silva (BRA)	21.22	10	20.91	6	20.99
8	Kevin Arthurton (SKN)			20.98	7	21.02
9	José Carlos Peña (CUB)	21.03	4	21.11	9	
10	Jamial Rolle (BAH)	21.10	5	21.14	10	
11	Erik Wilson (USA)	21.10	5	21.23	11	
12	Sherwin James (DMA)	21.20	9	21.26	12	
13	Keita Cline (IVB)	21.25	12	21.29	13	
14	Daniel Bailey (ANT)	21.26	13	21.36	14	
15	Adrian Durant (ISV)	21.19	8	21.45	15	
16	Danny García (DOM)	21.22	10	21.53	16	
17	Jairo Duzant (AHO)	21.31	14			
18	Bruce Swan (GRN)	21.38	15			
19	Rogelio Pizarro (PUR)	21.39	16			
20	Juan Pedro Toledo (MEX)	21.41	17			
21	Mario Rolando Blanco (GUA)	21.56	18			
22	Troy McIntosh (BAH)	21.56	18			
23	Xavier James (BER)	21.65	20			
24	Jayson Jones (BIZ)	21.80	21			
25	Diego Ferreira (PAR)	21.89	22			
26	Wladimir Afriani (HAI)	21.98	23			
27	Luis Morán (ECU)	22.58	24			
—	Andrés Gallegos (ECU)	DNF	—			
—	John Smith (DOM)	DNS	—			
—	Charlton Raffaela (AHO)	DNS	—			

== See also ==
- 2003 World Championships in Athletics – Men's 200 metres
- Athletics at the 2004 Summer Olympics – Men's 200 metres
