= Athletics at the 2003 Pan American Games – Men's 100 metres =

Men's 100 metres at the Pan American Games

The final of the Men's 100 metres event at the 2003 Pan American Games took place on Wednesday August 6, 2003, with the heats and the semifinals staged a day earlier. Original winner Mickey Grimes was stripped of the gold medal after testing positive for ephedrine.

== Medalists ==
Gold	Michael Frater; Jamaica
Silver	Mardy Scales; United States
Bronze	Anson Henry; Canada

== Records ==
World Record	Tim Montgomery (USA)	9.78 s	September 14, 2002	Paris, France
Pan Am Record	Leandro Peñalver (CUB)	10.06 s	August 24, 1983	Caracas, Venezuela

== Results ==
Rank	Athlete	Heats		Semis		Final
Rank	Athlete	Time	Rank	Time	Rank	Time
1	Michael Frater (JAM)	10.34	3	10.39	3	10.21
2	Mardy Scales (USA)	10.35	4	10.33	2	10.22
3	Anson Henry (CAN)	10.45	6	10.60	7	10.30
4	Édson Ribeiro (BRA)	10.37	5	10.39	3	10.31
5	Jarbas Mascarenhas (BRA)	10.52	8	10.57	6	10.34
6	Sheldon Morant (JAM)	10.30	2	10.61	8	10.36
7	Nicconnor Alexander (TRI)	10.45	7	10.42	5	10.42
—	Mickey Grimes (USA)	10.08	1	10.20	1	DSQ
9	Juan Pita (CUB)	10.65	19	10.56	9	
10	Luis Alexander Reyes (CUB)	10.55	14	10.61	10	
11	Churandy Martina (AHO)	10.42	9	10.62	11	
12	Jaycey Harper (TRI)	10.57	15	10.63	12	
13	Mario Blanco (GUA)	10.53	12	10.64	13	
14	Delwayne Delaney (SKN)	10.51	11	10.74	14	
14	Daniel Bailey (ANT)	10.53	12	10.74	14	
16	Bruce Swan (GRN)	10.45	10	10.79	16	
17	Danny García (DOM)	10.58	17			
18	Derrick Atkins (BAH)	10.59	18			
19	Diego Ferreira (PAR)	10.64	19			
20	John Smith (DOM)	10.69	20			
21	Jayson Jones (BIZ)	10.82	21			
22	Wladimir Afriani (HAI)	10.83	22			
23	Xavier James (BER)	10.83	23			
24	Jamial Rolle (BAH)	10.84	24			
25	Donnell Esdaille (SKN)	10.90	25			
26	Luis Morán (ECU)	10.96	26			
27	Azik Graham (VIN)	11.05	27			
28	Stephane Rabel (HAI)	11.18	28			
29	Andrés Gallegos (ECU)	11.22	29			

== See also ==
- 2003 World Championships in Athletics – Men's 100 metres
- Athletics at the 2004 Summer Olympics – Men's 100 metres
