= Athletics at the 2003 Pan American Games – Men's 5000 metres =

Men's 5000 metres at the Pan American Games

The Men's 5,000 metres event at the 2003 Pan American Games took place on Tuesday August 5, 2003.

== Medalists ==
Gold	Hudson de Souza; Brazil
Silver	David Galván; Mexico
Bronze	Marílson dos Santos; Brazil

== Records ==
World Record	Haile Gebrselassie (ETH)	12:39.36	June 13, 1998	Helsinki, Finland
Pan Am Record	Armando Quintanilla (MEX)	13:30.35	March 25, 1995	Mar del Plata, Argentina

== Results ==
Rank	Athlete	Time
1	Hudson de Souza (BRA)	13:50.71
2	David Galván (MEX)	13:52.92
3	Marílson dos Santos (BRA)	13:56.90
4	Alejandro Suárez (MEX)	13:58.19
5	Mauricio Díaz (CHI)	13:58.85
6	Freddy González (VEN)	14:21.53
7	William Naranjo (COL)	14:25.70
8	Patrick Fuller (BIZ)	14:39.23
9	Seth Hejny (USA)	14:50.33
10	Jesús Ramírez (DOM)	15:55.17
—	José Amado García (GUA)	DNF

== See also ==
- 2003 World Championships in Athletics – Men's 5000 metres
- Athletics at the 2004 Summer Olympics – Men's 5000 metres
