= Swimming at the 2003 Pan American Games – Men's 4 × 200 metre freestyle relay =

Men's 4 × 200 metre freestyle relay at the 2003 Pan American Games
- Venue: Juan Pablo Duarte Olympic Center
- Date: August 13 (Final)
- Competitors: 32 from 8 nations
- Winning time: 7:18.93

Medalists
Gold medal	Dan Ketchum; Jeff Lee; Ryan Lochte; Bryan Goldberg	United States
Silver medal	Carlos Jayme; Rafael Mósca; Gustavo Borges; Rodrigo Castro	Brazil
Bronze medal	Tobias Oriwol; Colin Russell; Brian Edey; Scott Dickens	Canada

The men's 4 x 200 metre freestyle relay event at the 2003 Pan American Games took place on August 13, 2003. There were only eight entries and therefore no preliminary heats were held for the event.

== Records ==
World Record	Australia	7:04.66	July 27, 2001	Fukuoka, Japan
Pan Am Record	United States	7:21.61	March 13, 1995	Mar del Plata, Argentina

== Results ==
Place	Nation	Swimmers	Time
1	United States	♦ Dan Ketchum ♦ Jeff Lee ♦ Ryan Lochte ♦ Bryan Goldberg	7:18.93 GR
2	Brazil	♦ Carlos Jayme ♦ Rafael Mósca ♦ Gustavo Borges ♦ Rodrigo Castro	7:25.17
3	Canada	♦ Tobias Oriwol ♦ Colin Russell ♦ Brian Edey ♦ Scott Dickens	7:27.18
4	Mexico	♦ ♦ ♦ ♦	7:30.20
5	Chile	♦ ♦ ♦ ♦	7:41.49
6	Virgin Islands	♦ ♦ ♦ ♦	7:55.68
7	Bahamas	♦ Jeremy Knowles ♦ Chris Vythoulkas ♦ Kristoph Carey ♦ Travano McPhee	7:58.58 NR
8	Dominican Republic	♦ ♦ ♦ ♦	7:59.22
