= Swimming at the 2003 Pan American Games – Women's 400 metre individual medley =

The Women's 400m Individual Medley event at the 2003 Pan American Games took place on August 12, 2003 (Day 11 of the Games). The defending Pan Am champion from 1999, Canada's Joanne Malar, was in the event.

== Medalists ==
| Gold | Georgina Bardach; Argentina |
| Silver | Kristen Caverly; United States |
| Bronze | Joanna Maranhão; Brazil |

== Records ==
| Record | Athlete | Time | Date | Venue |
|---|---|---|---|---|
| World Record | Yana Klochkova (UKR) | 4:33.59 | 2000-09-16 | Sydney, Australia |
| Pan Am Record | Joanne Malar (CAN) | 4:38.46 | 1999-08-02 | Winnipeg, Canada |

== Results ==
| Place | Swimmer | Heats | | Final |
| Place | Swimmer | Time | Rank | Time |
|---|---|---|---|---|
| 1 | Georgina Bardach (ARG) | 4:50.78 | 2 | 4:43.40 |
| 2 | Kristen Caverly (USA) | 4:51.69 | 3 | 4:46.18 |
| 2 | Joanna Maranhão (BRA) | 4:53.88 | 5 | 4:46.38 |
| 4 | Joanne Malar-Morreale (CAN) | 4:49.58 | 1 | 4:49.26 |
| 5 | Andrea Cassidy (USA) | 4:52.60 | 4 | 4:49.74 |
| 6 | Kelly Doody (CAN) | 4:53.90 | 6 | 4:51.63 |
| 7 | Sonia Álvarez (PUR) | 5:04.80 | 7 | 5:01.38 |
| 8 | Vanessa Duenas (COL) | 5:08.70 | 8 | 5:07.93 |
| 9 | Heather Roffey (CAY) | 5:12.77 | 9 | 5:06.77 |
| 10 | Vanessa Martínez (PUR) | 5:16.36 | 11 | 5:12.90 |
| 11 | Maria Zenoni (DOM) | 5:14.25 | 10 | 5:13.57 |
| 12 | Jimena del Pozo (PER) | 5:20.91 | 12 | 5:16.54 |
| 13 | Jamie Shufflebarger (ISV) | 5:27.15 | 15 | 5:19.57 |
| 14 | Priscila Zacarias (DOM) | 5:21.15 | 13 | 5:22.32 |
| 15 | Ayeisha Collymore (TRI) | 5:26.43 | 14 | 5:26.10 |
| 16 | April Knowles (BAH) | 5:32.62 | 16 | 5:28.19 |
