= Athletics at the 2003 Pan American Games – Men's 50 kilometres walk =

Men's 50 kilometres walk at the Pan American Games

The final of the Men's 50 km Race Walking event at the 2003 Pan American Games took place on Friday August 8, 2003. Only five men finished the race.

== Medalists ==
Gold	Germán Sánchez; Mexico
Silver	Mário dos Santos; Brazil
Bronze	Luis Fernando García; Guatemala

== Records ==
World Record	Robert Korzeniowski (POL)	3:36:39	August 8, 2002	Munich, Germany
Pan Am Record	Carlos Mercenario (MEX)	3:47:55	March 24, 1995	Mar del Plata, Argentina

== Results ==
Rank	Athlete	Time
1	Germán Sánchez (MEX)	4:05:02
2	Mário dos Santos (BRA)	4:07:37
3	Luis Fernando García (GUA)	4:12:14
4	Sérgio Galdino (BRA)	4:24:42
5	Philip Dunn (USA)	4:25:50
—	Rubén Javiel (DOM)	DNF
—	Julio René Martínez (GUA)	DNF
—	Jorge Luis Pino (CUB)	DNF
—	Omar Zepeda (MEX)	DSQ
—	Sean Albert (USA)	DSQ

== See also ==
- 2003 Race Walking Year Ranking
- 2003 World Championships in Athletics – Men's 50 kilometres walk
- Athletics at the 2004 Summer Olympics – Men's 50 kilometre walk
