= Athletics at the 2003 Pan American Games – Men's shot put =

Men's shot put at the Pan American Games

The final of the Men's Shot Put event at the 2003 Pan American Games took place on Tuesday August 5, 2003. USA's Reese Hoffa set a new Pan American Games record in the final, with a distance of 20.95 metres.

== Medalists ==
Gold	Reese Hoffa; United States
Silver	Marco Antonio Verni; Chile
Bronze	Bradley Snyder; Canada

== Records ==
World Record	Randy Barnes (USA)	23.12 m	May 20, 1990	Westwood, United States
Pan Am Record	C.J. Hunter (USA)	20.52 m	March, 1995	Mar del Plata, Argentina

== Results ==
Rank	Athlete	Throws						Final
Rank	Athlete	1	2	3	4	5	6	Result
1	Reese Hoffa (USA)	19.37	20.95	19.66	X	X	X	20.95 m
2	Marco Antonio Verni (CHI)	19.61	20.14	X	19.49	19.52	19.89	20.14 m
3	Bradley Snyder (CAN)	19.48	19.67	20.10	X	19.99	X	20.10 m
4	Daniel Taylor (USA)	19.16	X	X	19.69	19.46	X	19.69 m
5	Alexis Paumier (CUB)	17.96	—	X	19.32	X	X	19.32 m
6	Yojer Medina (VEN)	18.56	18.99	X	X	19.19	X	19.19 m
7	Jhonny Rodríguez (COL)	17.75	17.73	X	X	18.16	X	18.16 m
8	Dave Stoute (TRI)	17.11	17.65	17.28	17.47	—	17.36	17.65 m
9	Francisco Guzmán (MEX)	X	17.03	17.39				17.39 m
10	Dorian Scott (JAM)	X	16.67	17.02				17.02 m
11	José Ventura (DOM)	15.87	14.65	16.54				16.54 m
12	Expedi Peña (DOM)	15.06	X	X				15.06 m

== See also ==
- 2003 Shot Put Year Ranking
- 2003 World Championships in Athletics – Men's shot put
- Athletics at the 2004 Summer Olympics – Men's shot put
