= Athletics at the 2003 Pan American Games – Men's 20 kilometres walk =

Men's 20 kilometres walk at the Pan American Games

The Men's 20 km Race Walking event at the 2003 Pan American Games took place on Tuesday August 5, 2003. Ecuador's Jefferson Pérez regained the title he lost four years earlier to Bernardo Segura. The title defender from Mexico ended up in second place this time.

== Medalists ==
Gold	Jefferson Pérez; Ecuador
Silver	Bernardo Segura; Mexico
Bronze	Alejandro López; Mexico

== Records ==
World Record	Paquillo Fernández (ESP)	1:17:22	April 28, 2002	Turku, Finland
Pan Am Record	Bernardo Segura (MEX)	1:20:17	July 26, 1999	Winnipeg, Canada

== Results ==
Rank	Athlete	Time
1	Jefferson Pérez (ECU)	1:23:06
2	Bernardo Segura (MEX)	1:23:31
3	Alejandro López (MEX)	1:24:33
4	Luis Fernando López (COL)	1:27:32
5	Fredy Hernández (COL)	1:28:07
6	Cristian Muñoz (CHI)	1:31:07
7	Timothy Seaman (USA)	1:33:24
8	John Nunn (USA)	1:35:34
9	Edwin Centeno (PER)	1:39:16
10	José Ramón Henríquez (DOM)	1:42:50
11	Fraulin Caminero (DOM)	1:49:41
—	Luis Fernando García (GUA)	DNF
—	Fausto Quinde (ECU)	DNF
—	Julio René Martínez (GUA)	DSQ
—	José Alessandro Bagio (BRA)	DSQ

== See also ==
- 2003 Race Walking Year Ranking
- 2003 World Championships in Athletics – Men's 20 kilometres walk
- Athletics at the 2004 Summer Olympics – Men's 20 kilometre walk
