= Athletics at the 2003 Pan American Games – Men's 1500 metres =

Men's 1500 metres at the Pan American Games

The Men's 1,500 metres event at the 2003 Pan American Games took place on Saturday August 9, 2003.

== Medalists ==
| Gold | Hudson de Souza; Brazil |
| Silver | Michael Stember; United States |
| Bronze | Grant Robison; United States |

== Records ==
| World Record | Hicham El Guerrouj (MAR) | 3:26.00 | July 14, 1998 | Rome, Italy |
| Pan Am Record | Joaquim Cruz (BRA) | 3:40.26 | March 19, 1995 | Mar del Plata, Argentina |

== Results ==
| Rank | Athlete | Time |
|---|---|---|
| 1 | Hudson de Souza (BRA) | 3:45.72 |
| 2 | Michael Stember (USA) | 3:46.31 |
| 3 | Grant Robison (USA) | 3:46.68 |
| 4 | Miguel Ángel García (VEN) | 3:47.31 |
| 5 | Juan Luis Barrios (MEX) | 3:47.67 |
| 6 | Fabiano Peçanha (BRA) | 3:48.26 |
| 7 | Javier Carriqueo (ARG) | 3:50.95 |
| 8 | Byron Piedra (ECU) | 3:52.20 |
| 9 | Isidro Pimentel (DOM) | 3:53.27 |
| — | Alexander Greaux (PUR) | DNS |

== See also ==
- 2003 World Championships in Athletics – Men's 1500 metres
- Athletics at the 2004 Summer Olympics – Men's 1500 metres
