= Wrestling at the 2003 Pan American Games =

- Dates: August 6–8, 2003

The wrestling competition at the 2003 Pan American Games was held from August 6–8, 2003 in Santo Domingo, Dominican Republic. This was the first edition of the Pan American Games to include women's wrestling.

== Medal table ==
* Host nation (Dominican Republic)

Rank	Nation	Gold	Silver	Bronze	Total
1	Cuba	10	2	2	14
2	United States	8	4	5	17
3	Canada	0	6	2	8
4	Venezuela	0	2	6	8
5	Colombia	0	2	1	3
6	Brazil	0	1	0	1
6	Dominican Republic*	0	1	0	1
8	Peru	0	0	1	1
8	Puerto Rico	0	0	1	1
Totals (9 entries)		18	18	18	54

== Men's events ==
=== Men's freestyle ===
Event	Gold	Silver	Bronze
55 kg	Stephen Abas; United States	René Montero; Cuba	Mikheil Japaridze; Canada
60 kg	Yandro Quintana; Cuba	Guivi Sissaouri; Canada	Eric Guerrero; United States
66 kg	Serguei Rondón; Cuba	Edison Hurtado; Colombia	Jamill Kelly; United States
74 kg	Joe Williams; United States	Daniel González; Cuba	Zoltan Hunyady; Canada
84 kg	Yoel Romero; Cuba	Carl Rainville; Canada	Cael Sanderson; United States
96 kg	Daniel Cormier; United States	Antoine Jaoude; Brazil	Wilfredo Suarez; Cuba
120 kg	Kerry McCoy; United States	Edgar Yanez; Venezuela	Alexis Valera; Cuba

=== Men's Greco-Roman ===
Event	Gold	Silver	Bronze
55 kg	Lazaro Rivas Scull; Cuba	Brandon Paulson; United States	Eduardo Freites; Venezuela
60 kg	Roberto Monzón; Cuba	Luis Liendo; Venezuela	Jim Gruenwald; United States
66 kg	Juan Maren; Cuba	Angelo Mota Brea; Dominican Republic	Luis Izquierdo; Colombia
74 kg	Filiberto Azcuy; Cuba	Jose Escobar; Colombia	T. C. Dantzler; United States
84 kg	Luiz Lazo; Cuba	Bradley Vering; United States	Eddy Bartolozzi; Venezuela
96 kg	Ernesto Peña; Cuba	Justin Ruiz; United States	Guillermo Talavera; Venezuela
120 kg	Mijaín López; Cuba	Rulon Gardner; United States	Rafael Bareno; Venezuela

== Women's events ==
=== Women's freestyle ===
Event	Gold	Silver	Bronze
48 kg	Patricia Miranda; United States	Lyndsay Belisle; Canada	Flor Cordova; Peru
55 kg	Tina George; United States	Tonya Verbeek; Canada	Marcia Andrades; Venezuela
63 kg	Sara McMann; United States	Viola Yanik; Canada	Mabel Fonseca; Puerto Rico
72 kg	Toccara Montgomery; United States	Ohenewa Akuffo; Canada	Yasmily Ramos; Venezuela

== See also ==
- Wrestling at the 2004 Summer Olympics
