= Athletics at the 2003 Pan American Games – Men's marathon =

Men's marathon at the Pan American Games

The men's marathon event at the 2003 Pan American Games took place on Saturday, 9 August 2003. Brazil's title defender Vanderlei de Lima once again proved to be the best marathoner, clocking a winning time of 2h 19m 08s.

== Medalists ==
Gold	Vanderlei de Lima; Brazil
Silver	Bruce Deacon; Canada
Bronze	Diego Colorado; Colombia

== Records ==
World record	Khalid Khannouchi (USA)	2:05:38	14 April 2002	(United Kingdom) London, Great Britain
Pan Am record	Jorge González (PUR)	2:12:43	28 August 1983	Caracas, Venezuela

== Results ==
Rank	Athlete	Time
1	Vanderlei de Lima (BRA)	2:19:08
2	Bruce Deacon (CAN)	2:20:25
3	Diego Colorado (COL)	2:21:48
4	Aguelmis Rojas (CUB)	2:23:18
5	Francisco Bautista (MEX)	2:25:50
6	Daniel Simbrón (ARG)	2:28:21
7	Pamenos Ballantyne (VIN)	2:29:37
8	Chris Banks (USA)	2:32:22
9	Hugo Jiménez (COL)	2:35:26
10	Jeff Campbell (USA)	2:36:31
11	Cristian Villavicencio (NCA)	2:37:28
12	Larry Alberto Sánchez (VEN)	2:42:02
13	José Francisco Paulino (DOM)	2:43:11
—	Silvio Guerra (ECU)	DNF
—	Genílson da Silva (BRA)	DNF
—	Bernardo Jiménez (DOM)	DNF
—	Alfredo Arévalo (GUA)	DNF
—	Luis Fonseca (VEN)	DNF
—	Benjamín Paredes (MEX)	DNF

== See also ==
- Athletics at the 2003 Pan American Games – Women's marathon
- 2003 World Championships in Athletics – Men's Marathon
- Athletics at the 2004 Summer Olympics – Men's marathon
