= Athletics at the 2003 Pan American Games – Women's marathon =

Women's marathon at the Pan American Games

The women's marathon event at the 2003 Pan American Games took place on Saturday, 9 August 2003. Brazil's Márcia Narloch won the title, defeating title defender Érika Olivera from Chile.

== Medalists ==
Gold	Márcia Narloch; Brazil
Silver	Mariela González; Cuba
Bronze	Érika Olivera; Chile

== Records ==
World record	Paula Radcliffe (GBR)	2:15:25	13 April 2003	(United Kingdom) London, Great Britain
Pan Am record	Érika Olivera (CHI)	2:37:41	25 July 1999	Winnipeg, Canada

== Results ==
Rank	Athlete	Time
1	Márcia Narloch (BRA)	2:39:54
2	Mariela González (CUB)	2:42:55
3	Érika Olivera (CHI)	2:44:52
4	Iglandini González (COL)	2:47:40
5	Maria do Carmo Guimarães (BRA)	2:51:58
6	Maribel Burgos (PUR)	2:53:03
7	Angélica Sánchez (MEX)	2:53:56
8	Emperatriz Wilson (CUB)	2:54:16
9	Stacie Albourcek (USA)	2:55:14
10	Kelly Flathers (USA)	2:59:05
11	Lourdes Cruz (PUR)	3:04:12
12	Pascuala Beras (DOM)	3:04:47
13	Adelaide Carrington (VIN)	3:35:02
—	Isabel Juárez (MEX)	DNF
—	Martha Tenorio (ECU)	DNF

== See also ==
- Athletics at the 2003 Pan American Games – Men's marathon
- 2003 World Championships in Athletics – Women's Marathon
- Athletics at the 2004 Summer Olympics – Women's marathon
