= Mário dos Santos =

Brazilian racewalker

Personal information
- Born: 10 September 1979 (age 46) Cubatão, São Paulo

Sport
- Sport: Track and field
Medal record
Representing Brazil
Pan American Games
Silver medal – second place	2003 Santo Domingo	50km walk

Mário José dos Santos Júnior (born 10 September 1979 in Cubatão, São Paulo) is a male race walker from Brazil. He competed for his native country in two consecutive Summer Olympics, starting in 2004 (Athens, Greece).

He won the 50 km section of the 2012 South American Race Walking Championships with a time of 4:12:52 hours.

== Achievements ==
Year	Competition	Venue	Position	Event	Notes
Representing Brazil
1998	South American Junior Championships	Córdoba, Argentina	1st	10,000 m	42:14.02
1998	World Junior Championships	Annecy, France	—	10,000m	DNF
1999	South American Championships	Bogotá, Colombia	3rd	20,000 m	1:33:50.59
2001	South American Championships	Manaus, Brazil	2nd	20,000 m	1:32:45.90
2001	Universiade	Beijing, China	15th	20 km	1:31:43
2003	Pan American Games	Santo Domingo, Dominican Republic	2nd	50 km	4:07:37
2004	Olympic Games	Athens, Greece	40th	50 km	4:20:11
2007	Pan American Games	Rio de Janeiro, Brazil	4th	20 km	1:29.53
2007	Pan American Games	Rio de Janeiro, Brazil	–	50 km	DQ
2008	Olympic Games	Beijing, China	41st	50 km	4:10:25
2009	South American Championships	Lima, Peru	5th	20,000 m	1:25:14.8
2009	World Championships	Berlin, Germany	–	50 km	DNF
2015	World Championships	Beijing, China	–	50 km	DNF
