= Swimming at the 2003 Pan American Games – Men's 100 metre freestyle =

The Men's 100m Freestyle event at the 2003 Pan American Games took place on August 14, 2003 (Day 13 of the Games).

== Medalists ==
Gold	José Meolans; Argentina
Silver	George Bovell; Trinidad and Tobago
Bronze	Gustavo Borges; Brazil

== Records ==
Record	Athlete	Time	Date	Venue
World Record	Pieter van den Hoogenband (NED)	47.84	2000-09-19	Sydney, Australia
Pan Am Record	Fernando Scherer (BRA)	49.19	1999-08-04	Winnipeg, Canada

== Results ==
Place	Swimmer	Heats		Final
Place	Swimmer	Time	Rank	Time
1	José Meolans (ARG)	50.05	2	49.27
2	George Bovell (TRI)	49.97	1	49.61
3	Gustavo Borges (BRA)	50.59	4	49.90
4	Nick Brunelli (USA)	50.63	5	50.04
5	Jader Souza (BRA)	51.13	8	50.24
6	Ricardo Busquets (PUR)	50.82	6	50.37
7	Tommy Hannan (USA)	50.47	3	50.66
8	Matt Rose (CAN)	50.91	7	50.75
9	Paul Kutscher (URU)	51.37	11	51.48
10	Colin Russell (CAN)	51.35	10	51.57
11	George Gleason (ISV)	51.86	15	51.64
12	Antonio Hernández (CUB)	51.68	14	51.75
13	Alejandro Siqueiros (MEX)	51.66	13	51.88
14	Damian Alleyne (BAR)	52.13	18	51.89
15	Ismael Ortiz (PAN)	52.34	20	52.01
16	Francisco Picasso (URU)	52.17	19	52.14
17	Luis Rojas (VEN)	51.22	9	DNS
18	Raymond Rosal (VEN)	51.53	12	DNS
19	Marcos Hernández (CUB)	51.95	16	DNS
20	Camilo Becerra (COL)	52.12	17	DNS
21	Howard Hinds (AHO)	52.45	21	
22	Javier Díaz (MEX)	52.51	22	
23	Chris Vythoulkas (BAH)	52.53	23	
24	Max Schnettler (CHI)	52.55	24	
25	Josh Laban (ISV)	52.84	25	
26	Carlos Castro (CHI)	53.00	26	
27	Ronald Cowen (BER)	53.07	27	
28	Maran Cruz (PUR)	53.88	28	
29	Chris Backhaus (DOM)	53.91	29	
30	Jorge Rodríguez (DOM)	54.11	30	
31	Onan Thom (GUY)	54.14	31	
32	Erick Santos (DOM)	54.31	32	
33	Jamie Peterkin (LCA)	54.73	33	
34	Gustavo Martínez (HON)	54.74	34	
35	Fidel Davis (VIN)	1:02.25	35	
