= Roller sports at the 2003 Pan American Games =

Roller skating and inline hockey were contested at the 2003 Pan American Games, held from August 1 to August 17 in Santo Domingo, Dominican Republic.

== Roller skating ==
=== Men ===
Speed

Event	Gold	Silver	Bronze
Combined sprint	Joey Mantia; United States	José Guzmán; Chile	Fabricio Seguel; Argentina
Combined distance	Joey Mantia; United States	Fabricio Seguel; Argentina	Gustavo Naula; Ecuador

Artistic

Event	Gold	Silver	Bronze
Free skating	Marcel Sturmer; Brazil	Daniel Arriola; Argentina	Maurício Jaramillo; Colombia

=== Women ===
Speed

Event	Gold	Silver	Bronze
Combined sprint	Andrea González; Argentina	Paula Verdugo; Chile	Julie Glass; United States
Combined distance	Julie Glass; United States	Andrea González; Argentina	Cecilia Baena; Colombia

Artistic

Event	Gold	Silver	Bronze
Free skating	Heather Munckey; United States	Melissa Linsalata; Argentina	Mayra Ramos; Brazil

== Inline hockey ==
=== Men ===
Event	Gold	Silver	Bronze
Team	United States	Canada	Brazil

== Medal table ==
Rank	Nation	Gold	Silver	Bronze	Total
1	United States	5	0	1	6
2	Argentina	1	4	1	6
3	Brazil	1	0	2	3
4	Chile	0	2	0	2
5	Canada	0	1	0	1
6	Colombia	0	0	2	2
7	Ecuador	0	0	1	1
Totals (7 entries)		7	7	7	21
