= Jonathan Mauri =

Costa Rican swimmer (born 1984)

Personal information
- Born: January 31, 1984 (age 42)
Medal record
Men's swimming
Representing Costa Rica
FINA World Masters Championships
Gold medal – first place	2010 Gothenburg, Sweden	400 Individual Medley

Jonathan Mauri (born January 31, 1984) is a swimmer from Costa Rica. He represented his native country at the 2003 World Aquatics Championships in Barcelona, Spain and was a finalist at the 2003 Pan American Games held in Santo Domingo, Dominican Republic.

== Controversies ==
In 2016 Mauri successfully sued the Costa Rican State for over 233 million Costa Rican Colones due to the Government's denial to award him the Claudia Poll Sports Award, alleging that the denial of this award following his win of the Gold Medal at the Master's Category during the FINA World Masters Championships in 2010 at Gothenburg, Sweden had caused him moral damages, while the same Award had been awarded to Poll herself in recognition of her performance during the same event.
