= Mardy Scales =

American sprinter (born 1981)

Personal information
- Nationality: United States
- Born: September 10, 1981 (age 45) Franklin, Tennessee
- Height: 5 ft 9 in (1.75 m)
- Weight: 160 lb (73 kg)

Sport
- Sport: Track and field
- Events: 100 metres, 200 metres
- College team: Middle Tennessee Blue Raiders

Achievements and titles
- Personal bests: 100 m: 10.07 s (Austin 2004); 200 m: 20.62 s (Malmö 2005)
Medal record
Men's athletics
Representing the United States
Pan American Games
Silver medal – second place	2003 Santo Domingo	100 m

Marcellus Andrellious "Mardy" Scales (born September 10, 1981) is an American sprinter who specializes in the 100 metres.

He won a silver medal at the 2003 Pan American Games. He also competed in the 4×100 metres relay at the 2005 World Championships, but after a failed exchange the US team was disqualified.

His personal best time over 100 metres is 10.07 seconds, achieved in June 2004 in Austin. His personal best time over 60 metres is 6.59 seconds, achieved in February 2005 in Fayetteville. In the 200 metres, he has 20.62 seconds, achieved in August 2005 in Malmö.

He also serves as an assistant track and field coach at Kennesaw State University, earning his bachelor's degree in physical education from Middle Tennessee State University in 2013.
