= Swimming at the 2003 Pan American Games – Men's 50 metre freestyle =

The Men's 50m Freestyle event at the 2003 Pan American Games took place on August 16, 2003 (Day 15 of the Games). Fernando Scherer BRA) won his third consecutive Pan Am 50 freestyle title with 22.40, with José Meolans (ARG) second in 22.42 and Gary Hall, Jr. (USA) third with 22.43.

== Medalists ==
Gold	Fernando Scherer; Brazil
Silver	José Meolans; Argentina
Bronze	Gary Hall, Jr. United States

== Records ==
Record	Athlete	Time	Date	Venue
World Record	Alexander Popov (RUS)	21.64	2000-06-01	Moscow, Russia
Pan Am Record	Fernando Scherer (BRA)	22.22	1999-08-06	Winnipeg, Canada

== Results ==
Place	Swimmer	Heats		Final
Place	Swimmer	Time	Rank	Time
1	Fernando Scherer (BRA)	22.55	3	22.40
2	José Meolans (ARG)	22.68	4	22.42
3	Gary Hall, Jr. (USA)	22.51	2	22.43
4	Ricardo Busquets (PUR)	22.49	1	22.52
5	Marcos Hernández (CUB)	22.90	7	22.64
6	Jader Souza (BRA)	22.79	5	22.80
7	Matt Rose (CAN)	22.80	6	22.89
8	Camilo Becerra (COL)	22.97	8	23.16
9	Julio Santos (ECU)	23.33	9	23.39
10	Chris McCrary (USA)	23.35	10	23.43
11	Raymond Rosal (VEN)	23.41	11	23.47
12	Felipe Delgado (ECU)	23.62	12	23.48
13	Josh Laban (ISV)	23.72	16	23.51
14	Octavio Alesi (VEN)	23.69	13	23.64
15	Francisco Picasso (URU)	23.70	14	23.69
16	Howard Hinds (AHO)	23.70	14	24.04
17	Paul Kutscher (URU)	23.72	16	
18	Antonio Hernández (CUB)	23.78	18	
19	Ismael Ortiz (PAN)	23.97	19	
20	Nicholas Bovell (TRI)	24.05	20	
21	Alejandro Siqueiros (MEX)	24.17	21	
22	Max Schnettler (CHI)	24.45	22	
23	Chris Vythoulkas (BAH)	24.46	23	
24	Erick Santos (DOM)	24.56	24	
25	Jamie Peterkin (LCA)	24.59	25	
26	Gustavo Martínez (HON)	24.71	26	
27	Maran Cruz (PUR)	24.75	27	
28	Onan Thom (GUY)	24.83	28	
29	Davy Bisslik (ARU)	24.90	29	
30	Stephenson Wallace (VIN)	26.73	30	

== See also ==
- Swimming at the 2004 Summer Olympics – Men's 50 metre freestyle
