= Bruce Deacon =

Canadian long-distance runner

Personal information
- Born: December 5, 1966 (age 59) Ottawa, Canada

Sport
- Sport: Track and field
Medal record
Representing Canada
Pan American Games
Silver medal – second place	2003 Santo Domingo	Marathon

Bruce William Deacon (born December 5, 1966) is a former Canadian long-distance runner, notably in the full marathon. Deacon was born in Ottawa, Ontario, Canada.

Deacon competed in the marathon at the 1996 Summer Olympics and the 2000 Summer Olympics. He placed 11th and 16th respectively at the World Athletics Championships in 1995 and 1997. Deacon was the first two-time winner and is currently the only three-time winner of the California International Marathon (in 1991, 1995, and 2001), as well as 8th, 6th, and 4th-place finishes in 1990, 1998, and 2002 respectively. At the 2002 event, he set a personal best with a time of 2:13:18. Deacon claimed the silver medal in the marathon at the 2003 Pan American Games. Now retired from competing internationally, Bruce is a coach and sport consultant, working for Run Fast Consulting Inc.

== Achievements ==
- All results regarding marathon, unless stated otherwise.

Year	Competition	Venue	Position	Notes
Representing Canada
1991	California International Marathon	California State Capitol, United States	1st	2:15:16
1995	California International Marathon	California State Capitol, United States	1st	2:13:59
1995	World Championships	Gothenburg, Sweden	11th	2:16:58
1996	Olympic Games	Atlanta, United States	39th	2:19:56
1997	World Championships	Athens, Greece	16th	2:20:29
1999	World Championships	Seville, Spain	27th	2:20:25
2000	National Capital Marathon	Ottawa, Ontario, Canada	1st	2:17:12.5
2000	Olympic Games	Sydney, Australia	44th	2:21:38
2001	California International Marathon	California State Capitol, United States	1st	2:22:12
2001	World Championships	Edmonton, Alberta, Canada	46th	2:30:22
2002	California International Marathon	California State Capitol, United States	4th	2:13:18
