= Football at the 2003 Pan American Games =

- Venues: Estadio Parque del Este; Estadio Panamericano, San Cristóbal; Estadio Olímpico Juan Pablo Duarte
- Dates: August 2−15
- No. of events: 2 (1 men, 1 women)

Football competitions at the 2003 Pan American Games in Santo Domingo, Dominican Republic were held between August 2 and 15, 2003.

Matches were held at three stadiums: Estadio Parque del Este, Estadio Panamericano, San Cristóbal, and Estadio Olímpico Juan Pablo Duarte.

== Medal summary ==
=== Medal table ===
Rank	Nation	Gold	Silver	Bronze	Total
1	Brazil	1	1	0	2
2	Argentina	1	0	0	1
3	Canada	0	1	0	1
4	Mexico	0	0	2	2
Totals (4 entries)		2	2	2	6

=== Medalists ===
Event	Gold	Silver	Bronze
Men's tournament	Argentina	Brazil	Mexico
Women's tournament	Brazil	Canada	Mexico
