= Ana Muniz =

Brazilian swimmer (born 1984)

Personal information
- Full name: Ana Carolina de Castro Muniz
- Nationality: Brazil
- Born: March 14, 1984 (age 42) Campo Grande, Mato Grosso do Sul, Brazil
- Height: 1.68 m (5 ft 6 in)
- Weight: 67 kg (148 lb)

Sport
- Sport: Swimming
- Strokes: Freestyle
Medal record
Women's swimming
Representing Brazil
Pan American Games
Silver medal – second place	2003 Santo Domingo	4x200 m free
Bronze medal – third place	1999 Winnipeg	4x200 m free
South American Games
Gold medal – first place	2002 Belém	200 m freestyle
Silver medal – second place	2002 Belém	400 m freestyle
Bronze medal – third place	2002 Belém	800 m freestyle

Ana Carolina de Castro Muniz (born March 14, 1984) is a freestyle swimmer from Brazil.

At the 1999 Pan American Games in Winnipeg, she won the bronze medal in the 4×200-metre freestyle. She also finished 5th in the 400-metre freestyle, 6th in the 200-metre freestyle, and 6th in the 800-metre freestyle.

In November 1999, she broke the short-course South American record of the 200-metre freestyle, with a time of 2:01.09.

In December 1999, Muniz broke the South American record of the 800-metre freestyle, with a time of 8:48.53.

In 1999, she was also South American record holder of the 400-metre freestyle, with a time of 4:16.32.

At the 2000 FINA World Swimming Championships (25 m), in Athens, Muniz finished 9th in the 4×200-metre freestyle, where she broke the South American record, with a time of 8:18.87, along with Monique Ferreira, Tatiana Lemos and Paula Baracho. She also finished 19th in the 400-metre freestyle, and 23rd in the 200-metre freestyle.

At the 2002 South American Games, in Belém, she won a gold medal in the 200-metre freestyle, silver in the 400-metre freestyle, and bronze in the 800-metre freestyle.

Participating in the 2003 World Aquatics Championships, in Barcelona, she finished 12th in the 4×200-metre freestyle.

She won the silver medal in the women's 4×200-metre freestyle relay at the 2003 Pan American Games in Santo Domingo, Dominican Republic, where she broke the South American record, with a time of 8:10.54, along with Monique Ferreira, Mariana Brochado and Paula Baracho. Muniz also finished 6th in the 800-metre freestyle.
