= Dominican Republic at the 2003 Pan American Games =

- IOC code: DOM
- NOC: Comité Olímpico Dominicano
- Website: www.colimdo.org

in Santo Domingo 1–17 August 2003
- Flag bearer: Felix Sanchez
- Medals Ranked 9th: Gold 10 Silver 12 Bronze 19 Total 41

Pan American Games appearances (overview)
- 1951; 1955; 1959; 1963; 1967; 1971; 1975; 1979; 1983; 1987; 1991; 1995; 1999; 2003; 2007; 2011; 2015; 2019; 2023

The Dominican Republic participated at the 2003 Pan American Games, held in its capital Santo Domingo, from 1 to 17 August 2003 as the host nation.

== Medals ==
=== Gold ===
===== Athletics =====
- Men's 400 m hurdles: Félix Sánchez
- Women's high jump: Juana Arrendel

===== Boxing =====
- Men's middleweight (75 kg): Juan José Ubaldo

===== Karate =====
- Men's Kumite (74 kg): Rubel Salomón
- Women's Kumite (+58 kg): Heidy Rodríguez

===== Table tennis =====
- Men's Singles: Lin Ju

===== Taekwondo =====
- Men's 68 kg: Luis Benítez
- Women's +67 kg: Gina María Ruiz

===== Volleyball =====
- Women's tournament: Dominican Republic

===== Weightlifting =====
- Women's 75 kg: Wanda Rijo

=== Silver ===
===== Basketball =====
- Men's tournament: Dominican Republic

===== Boxing =====
- Men's light welterweight (64 kg): Isidro Mosquea
- Men's flyweight (51 kg): Juan Carlos Payano

===== Karate =====
- Men's Kumite (+80 kg): Sterling Felix

===== Table tennis =====
- Women's Singles: Wu Xue

===== Taekwondo =====
- Men's +80 kg: Rowell Pier Jérez
- Women's 57 kg: Dinanyiris Furcal

===== Weightlifting =====
- Men's 56 kg: Tomas Aquino
- Women's 48 kg: Guillermina Candelario
- Women's 53 kg: Yudelquis Contreras

=== Bronze ===
===== Athletics =====
- Men's 4 x 400 m relay: Arismendy Peguero, Carlos Santa, Julio Vidal and Félix Sánchez
- Women's shot put: Fior Vásquez

===== Boxing =====
- Men's featherweight (57 kg): Jhonathan Batista
- Men's lightweight (60 kg): Manuel Félix Díaz
- Men's welterweight (69 kg): Euris González
- Men's light heavyweight (81 kg): Argenis Casimiro Núñez

===== Equestrian =====
- Dressage individual: Yvonne Losos de Muñiz

===== Karate =====
- Men's Kumite (68 kg): Dionicio Gustavo

===== Table tennis =====
- Women's Double: Wu Xue - Olga Vila

===== Table tennis =====
- Men's Double: Lin Ju - Roberto Brito

===== Taekwondo =====
- Men's 58 kg: Gabriel Mercedes
- Men's 80 kg: Eddy Antonio Luna

===== Weightlifting =====
- Men's +105 kg: Plaiter Reyes
- Women's 53 kg: Wendy Amparo
- Women's 69 kg: Miosotis Heredia
- Women's +75 kg: María Carvajal

== Results by event ==
=== Athletics ===
Track

Athlete	Event	Heat		Final	
Athlete	Event	Time	Rank	Time	Rank
Danny García	Men's 100 m	10.58	17	—	17
Danny García	Men's 200 m	21.53	16	—	16
John Smith	Men's 100 m	10.69	20	—	20
John Smith	Men's 200 m	DNS	—	—	—
Carlos Santa	Men's 400 m	45.82	5	45.85	6
Isidro Pimentel	Men's 1500 m	—	—	3:53.27	9
Jesús Ramírez	Men's 5000 m	—	—	15:55.17	10
Félix Sánchez	Men's 400 m hurdles	48.99	2	48.19	1st place, gold medalist(s)
Miguel García	Men's 400 m hurdles	50.89	9	—	9
María Carrión	Women's 100 m	11.90	13	—	13
Marleni Mejía	Women's 100 m	12.30	16	—	16
Clara Hernández	Women's 400 m	55.22	14	—	14
Sonny García	Women's 1500 m	—	—	4:32.31	10
Juana Mejía	Women's 100 m hurdles	14.17	14	—	14
Jazmín Rodríguez	Women's 400 m hurdles	58.42 NR	11	—	11

Road

Athlete	Event	Time	Rank
José Francisco Paulino	Men's marathon	2:43:11	13
Bernardo Jiménez	Men's marathon	DNF	—
Pascuala Beras	Women's marathon	3:04:47	12
José Ramón Henríquez	Men's 20 km race walk	1:42:50	10
Fraulin Caminero	Men's 20 km race walk	1:49:41	11
Cristina Rodríguez	Women's 20 km race walk	1:51:47	9
Francisca Lora	Women's 20 km race walk	1:52:30	10
Rubén Javiel	Men's 50 km race walk	DNF	—

Field

Athlete	Event	Throws						Total	
Athlete	Event	1	2	3	4	5	6	Distance	Rank
Mary Mercedes	Women's hammer throw	51.50	50.36	X	—	—	—	51.50 m	11
Anneris Méndez	Women's hammer throw	X	45.86	47.41	—	—	—	47.41 m	12
Expedi Peña	Men's discus throw	48.39	48.09	51.33	—	—	—	51.33 m	9
Mary Mercedes	Women's discus throw	X	44.46	X	42.18	X	X	44.46 m	7
José Ventura	Men's shot put	15.87	14.65	16.54	—	—	—	16.54 m	11
Expedi Peña	Men's shot put	15.06	X	X	—	—	—	15.06 m	12
Fior Vásquez	Women's shot put	17.73	17.76	18.00	16.63	15.76	18.14	18.14 m	3rd place, bronze medalist(s)

Heptathlon

Athlete	Heptathlon							Total	
Athlete	1	2	3	4	5	6	7	Points	Rank
Judith Méndez	14.10	1.65	13.34	24.52	5.38	47.24	2:16.56	5783	4
Francia Manzanillo	14.34	1.59	10.14	25.63	5.72	44.32	2:20.28	5359	7

=== Basketball ===
==== Men's tournament ====
- José Vargas
- Franklin Western
- Carlos Payano
- Carlos Paniagua
- Otto Ramírez
- Miguel Angel Pichardo
- Amaury Filion
- Luis Flores
- Jack Michael Martínez
- Carlos Morban
- Jeffrey Greer
- Francisco García

Head coach:

- Héctor Báez

=== Boxing ===
Athlete	Event	Round of 16	Quarterfinals	Semifinals	Final
Athlete	Event	Opposition Result	Opposition Result	Opposition Result	Opposition Result
Jhonny Montero	Light flyweight	Bain (BAH); W 37–10	Castañeda (MEX); L 11–31	Did not advance	
Juan Carlos Payano	Flyweight	Bye	Martínez (USA); W 18–17	Pereira (BRA); W 19–10	Gamboa (CUB); L 22–28 → (silver)
Argenis Mendez	Bantamweight	Rigondeaux (CUB); L 2–17	Did not advance		
Jhonatan Batista	Featherweight	Bye	Gaudet (CAN); L 6–18	Did not advance	
Manuel Félix Díaz	Lightweight	Quiñonez (ECU); W 23–5	Ferreyra (ARG); W 26–13	Kindelán (CUB); L 12–16 → (bronze)	Did not advance
Isidro Mosquea	Light welterweight	Bye	Hernández (ESA); W 17–5	Costa (BRA); W 19–17	López (VEN); L 9–30 → (silver)
Euris González	Welterweight	Bye	Trupish (CAN); W 25–19	Aragón (CUB); L 4–25 → (bronze)	Did not advance
Juan José Ubaldo	Middleweight	Bye	Calla (PER); W 17–8	Pascal (CAN); W 18–11	Despaigne (CUB); W 23–12 → (gold)
Argenis Casimiro	Light heavyweight	Bye	Silva (BRA); W RSC–3	Hernández (CUB); L RSC–4 → (bronze)	Did not advance
Francisco García	Heavyweight	Bye	Manswell (TRI); L 5–12	Did not advance	
Arthur Ontañez	Super heavyweight	Bye	Estrada (USA); L 2–20	Did not advance	

=== Swimming ===
==== Men's competitions ====
Athlete	Event	Heat		Final	
Athlete	Event	Time	Rank	Time	Rank
Erick Santos	50 m freestyle	24.56	24	Did not advance	
Chris Backhaus	100 m freestyle	53.91	29	Did not advance	
Jorge Rodríguez	100 m freestyle	54.11	30	Did not advance	
Erick Santos	100 m freestyle	54.31	32	Did not advance	

==== Women's competitions ====
Athlete	Event	Heat		Final	
Athlete	Event	Time	Rank	Time	Rank
Priscila Zacarias	200 m freestyle	2:13.81	19	Did not advance	

=== Triathlon ===
Athlete	Event	Race			Total	
Athlete	Event	Swim	Bike	Run	Time	Rank
Yean Jiménez	Men's individual	20:57.200	58:38.500	36:54.800	01:57:24	14
Robert Nuñéz	Men's individual	22:01.900	1:00:56.200	43:11.200	02:07:12	27
Jonathan Monsanto	Men's individual	24:55.700	—	—	DNF	—
Anabel Mateo	Women's individual	20:52.900	1:08:05.400	55:14.200	18	
Melissa Duran	Women's individual	21:49.800	—	—	DNF	—

== See also ==
- Dominican Republic at the 2004 Summer Olympics
