= Basque pelota at the 2003 Pan American Games =

Basque pelota was on the program for the second time at the 2003 Pan American Games in Santo Domingo, Dominican Republic.

== Men's events ==
| Event | Gold | Silver | Bronze |
|---|---|---|---|
| 30m Frontenis | Mexico; Mexico | Cuba; Cuba | Argentina; Argentina |

== Women's events ==
| Event | Gold | Silver | Bronze |
|---|---|---|---|
| 30m Frontenis | Mexico; Mexico | Argentina; Argentina | Cuba; Cuba |

=== Open events ===
| Event | Gold | Silver | Bronze |
|---|---|---|---|
| 30m Goma | Argentina; Argentina | Mexico; Mexico | Cuba; Cuba |
| 36m Mano Singles | Cuba; Cuba | Mexico; Mexico | Venezuela; Venezuela |
| 36m Mano Doubles | Mexico; Mexico | Cuba; Cuba | Venezuela; Venezuela |
| 36m Cuero | Argentina; Argentina | Mexico; Mexico | Uruguay; Uruguay |
