= Mariana Brochado =

Brazilian swimmer (born 1984)

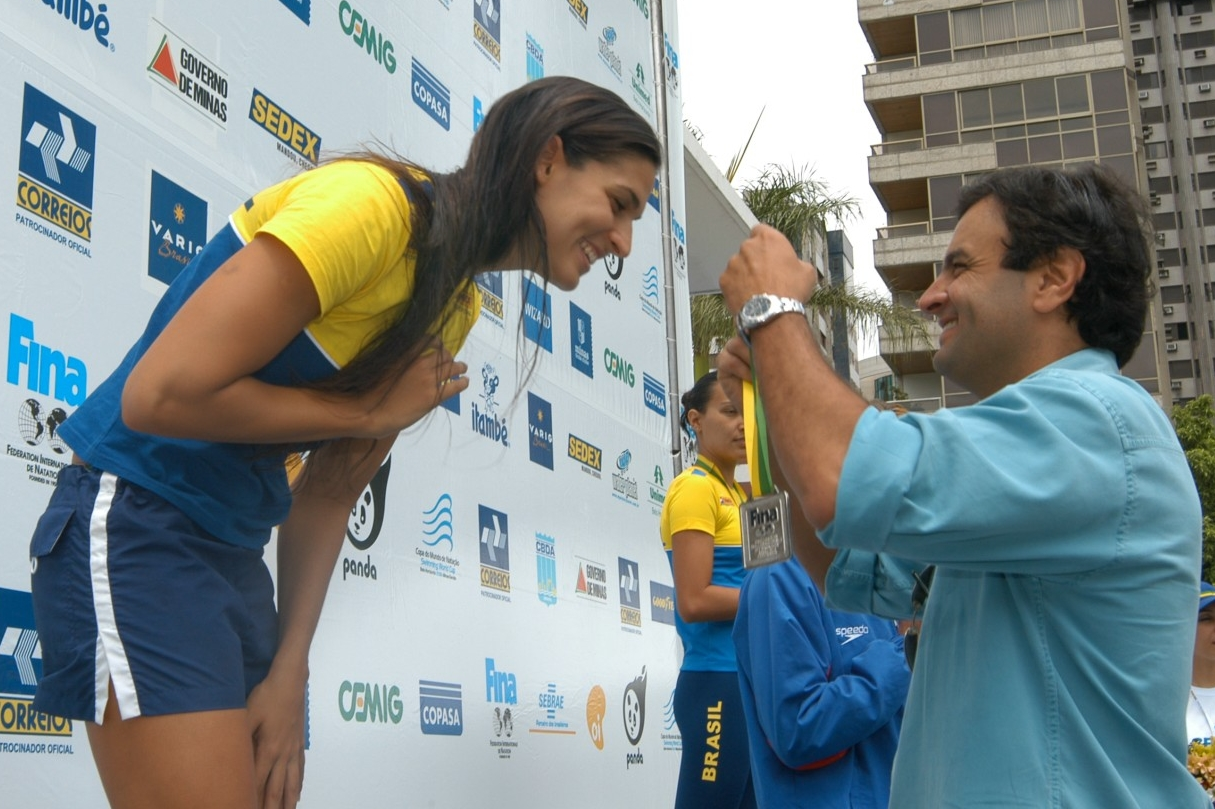
- Mariana Brochado in 2006

Personal information
- Full name: Mariana Nery Brochado
- Nationality: Brazil
- Born: 18 December 1984 (age 41) Rio de Janeiro, Brazil
- Height: 1.74 m (5 ft 9 in)
- Weight: 62 kg (137 lb)

Sport
- Sport: Swimming
- Strokes: Freestyle
Medal record
Women's swimming
Representing Brazil
Pan American Games
Silver medal – second place	2003 Santo Domingo	4x200m freestyle
Bronze medal – third place	2003 Santo Domingo	200m freestyle

Mariana Nery Brochado (born 18 December 1984) is a Brazilian freestyle swimmer. She won the bronze medal in the women's 200-metre freestyle at the Pan American Games in Santo Domingo, Dominican Republic. A member of Clube de Regatas do Flamengo swimming team, she also represented her native country at the 2004 Summer Olympics in Athens, Greece.

== Biography ==
One of the muses of Brazilian sport, Mariana entered the Flamengo's swimming school at the age of four years. Three years later, she was part of the infant team. His first state title came in 1998, the same year that she debuted in high-level tournaments. Throughout her career defended red-black colours of Flamengo, the club of her heart, yet she has been besieged by other swim teams.

In 2001, Mariana reached the elite of Brazilian swimming, winning the South American and Brazilian absolute juvenile in the 200-metre freestyle. The following year, 2002, he won two more titles in South America, now in absolute category, and qualified for the 2003 Pan American Games.

She was at the 2002 Pan Pacific Swimming Championships in Yokohama, where she broke the South American record of 200-metre freestyle with a time of 2:01.45. She was also in the 200-metre freestyle final, finishing in 8th place. In the 4×200-metre freestyle, she did the final, finishing in 5th place and beating the South American record with a time of 8:15.80. She also finished 6th in the 4×100-metre freestyle.

At the 2003 Pan American Games in Santo Domingo, Brochado won silver in the 4×200-metre freestyle, breaking the South American record, with a time of 8:10.54, along with Monique Ferreira, Ana Muniz and Paula Baracho. She also won bronze in the 200-metre freestyle. Although these medals won in 2003 Pan have called more attention around her name that year, before heading to Santo Domingo, Mariana represented Brazil in the 2003 World Aquatics Championships, in Barcelona, one of three World Championships that she played, when she reached the semifinal of the 200-metre freestyle, beating the South American record by scoring 2:01.17, her best mark in long course throughout her career, and obtained the 15th place overall at the proof. In addition, she helped the 4×200-metre freestyle to guarantee a place in Athens, with the 12th position, a moment of great emotion in her career. She also got the 19th place in the 400-metre freestyle.

Returning from Santo Domingo, Brochado became nationally recognized as a muse of Brazilian sport and swimming. While declaring that she would rather be recognized for her achievements in swimming pools than just for its beauty, the title of "muse", added to her achievements, gave her an easier to attract sponsorship, and she was one of the swimmers with the largest number of sponsors of her era.

At Brazil Trophy, in 2004, cemented her status as the best Brazilian in the race, and secured his place in the national team that would go to the Olympic Games in Athens 2004.

Ran a good campaign in Athens 2004. Despite being eliminated in the playoffs of the 200-metre freestyle, ranking 23rd place, she helped the Brazilian 4×200-metre freestyle to go to first Olympic final, finishing in 7th place. She also established the new South American record (8:05.29), along with Joanna Maranhão, Monique Ferreira and Paula Baracho.

At the 2005 World Aquatics Championships in Montreal, finished 19th in the 400-metre freestyle and 13th in 4×200-metre freestyle.

Brochado was at the 2006 Pan Pacific Swimming Championships, in Victoria, British Columbia, Canada, at 200-metre, 400-metre and 800-metre freestyle.

Participating in the 2006 FINA World Swimming Championships (25 m) in Shanghai, she reached the 400-metre freestyle final, finishing in 8th place. At the final, broke the South American record with a time of 4:07.21. She also got the 9th place in the 4×200-metre freestyle.

In 2007, she saw her dream to represent Brazil in the Pan American Games, held in Rio de Janeiro, her hometown, being frustrated by not getting ratings.

== See also ==
- South American records in swimming
