= Vanderlei de Lima =

Brazilian long-distance runner

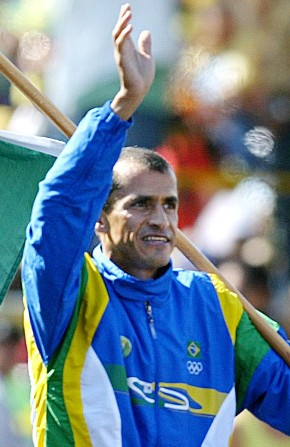
- Vanderlei at the Independence Day parade in 2004.

Personal information
- Born: Vanderlei Cordeiro de Lima; 4 July 1969 (age 57) Cruzeiro do Oeste, Paraná, Brazil

Sport
- Sport: Athletics
- Event: Marathon
Medal record
Men's athletics
Representing Brazil
Olympic Games
Bronze medal – third place	2004 Athens	Marathon
	Pierre de Coubertin medal	2004
Pan American Games
Gold medal – first place	1999 Winnipeg	Marathon
Gold medal – first place	2003 Santo Domingo	Marathon

Vanderlei Cordeiro de Lima (born 4 July 1969) is a retired Brazilian long-distance runner. He was born in Cruzeiro do Oeste, Paraná. While leading the marathon after 35 km (22 mi) at the 2004 Summer Olympics, he was attacked on the course by Irish former priest Cornelius "Neil" Horan. Following the incident, Lima fell from first to third place, eventually winning the bronze medal. He was later awarded the Pierre de Coubertin Medal for his sportsmanship shown in that race.

Lima won the Tokyo International Marathon in 1996 and the Hamburg Marathon in 2004. He won the South American Cross Country Championships in 1995, and the marathon at the Pan American Games consecutively in 1999 and 2003. He lit the Olympic cauldron and carried the Olympic flame during the opening ceremony of the 2016 Summer Olympics.

== Professional career ==
Lima started out as a cross country runner, representing Brazil at the 1989 and 1992 IAAF World Cross Country Championships. He won a bronze medal at the 1993 South American Cross Country Championships before going on to win the competition in 1995.

Lima won his first marathon in 1996, taking the Tokyo International Marathon title. He attended his first Summer Olympics that same year, running in the marathon at the 1996 Atlanta Games and finishing in 47th place. His first world appearance followed a year later at the 1997 World Championships in Athletics, where he finished 23rd. He set a personal best of 2:08:31 at the 1998 Tokyo Marathon, finishing second behind Alberto Juzdado.

Lima was a two-time Pan American champion, running 2:17:20 at the 1999 Games and 2:19:08 for the second victory at the 2003 Games. He began the 2004 season with a win (2:09:39) at the Hamburg Marathon.

=== Attack at 2004 Summer Olympics ===
On 29 August 2004, at the 2004 Summer Olympics in Athens, Lima was attempting to become the first Brazilian to win an Olympic gold medal in the marathon. Soon after the 35 km (22 mi) mark, holding a lead of around 25 seconds, Lima was halted and grappled with by spectator Neil Horan, an Irish priest who was later defrocked. Horan had previously disrupted the 2003 Formula One British Grand Prix by running onto the Silverstone track. Greek spectator Polyvios Kossivas helped free Lima from Horan's grasp and help Lima resume running. Horan said "I wasn't doing it as a prank, I was doing it to spread the gospel and to prepare people for the Second Coming."

Lima lost about 5–10 seconds in the incident, and he was passed by Italian Stefano Baldini (2:10:55) and American Meb Keflezighi (2:11:29) later at the 38 km (24 mi) mark. Lima ultimately finished third with a time of 2:12:11, winning the bronze medal. The Brazilian Athletics Confederation launched an appeal on behalf of Lima with president Roberto Gesta de Melo claiming that "someone took him out of the race and we are asking for a gold medal for our athlete... solutions like that have been done in the past for other events." The appeal was rejected.

At the closing of the event, the International Olympic Committee awarded Lima the Pierre de Coubertin Medal for the spirit of sportsmanship. The medal was officially presented to Lima on 7 December in Rio de Janeiro, during a formal ceremony organized on a yearly basis by the Brazilian Olympic Committee (COB) during the Prêmio Brasil Olímpico. Lima was also named Brazilian Athlete of the Year in 2004, receiving the trophy presented by the COB at the same time as the Pierre de Coubertin Medal. His award was the first occasion in which the winner was selected by online popular vote.

=== Post-Olympic career ===
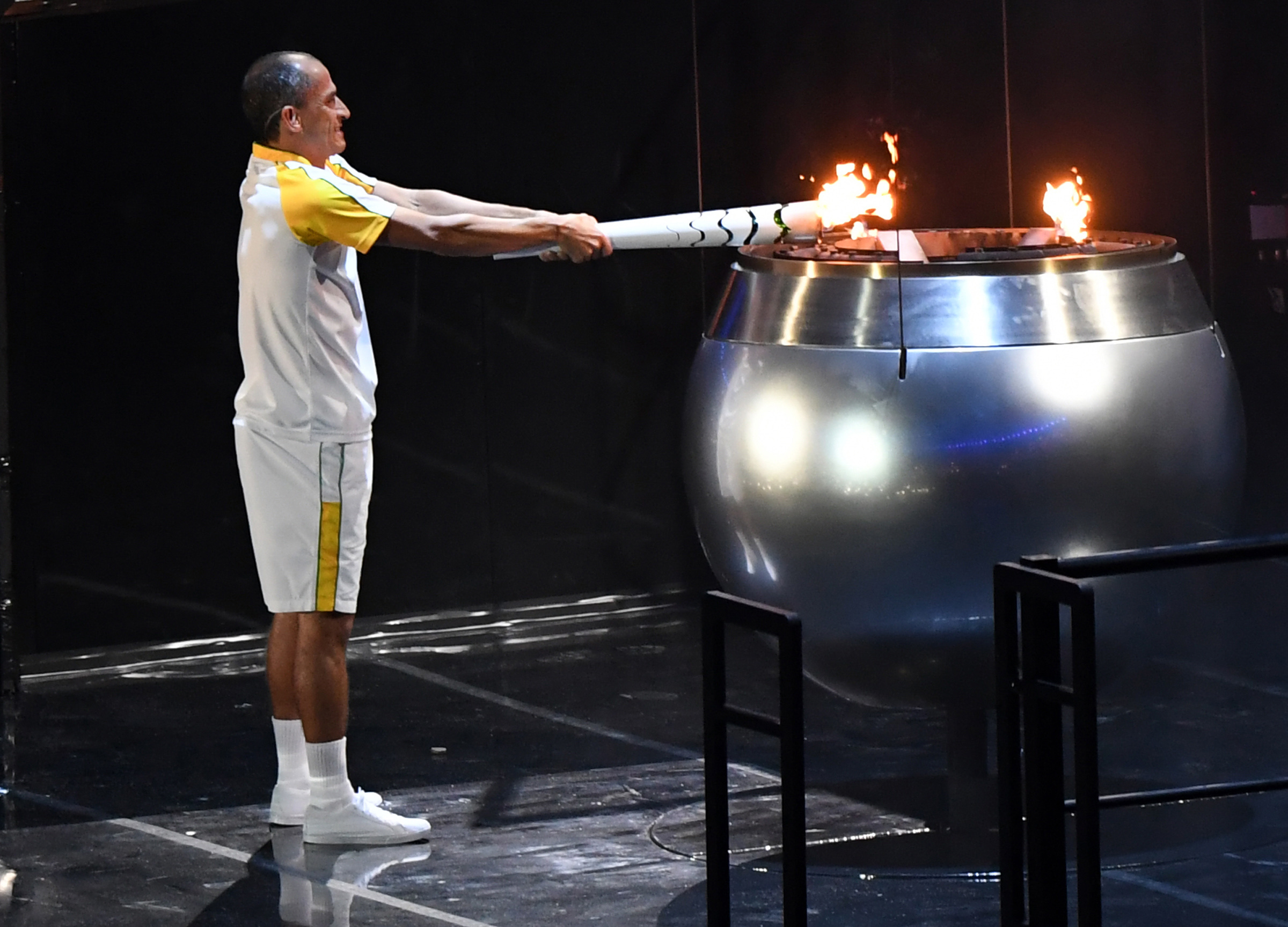
Lima lighting the Olympic cauldron in 2016.

Lima ran at the world championships for a second time, but did not finish in the 2005 World marathon race. He took part in the 2005 Saint Silvester Road Race that same year but only managed to finish in 14th place. Lima attempted to defend his title at the 2007 Pan American Games, but dropped out with muscular problems at the 37-kilometer mark. He retired as a marathoner after running the Paris Marathon in April 2009.

Lima's biography was written by Renata Adrião D'Angelo, Vanderlei de Lima - A Maratona de uma Vida (A Marathon of Life), printed in Brazil by Casa da Palavra, in 2007. Lima took part in the 2016 Summer Olympics torch relay in Brasília. In August 2016, he received the honor of lighting the Olympic Flame at the 2016 Summer Olympics in Rio de Janeiro during the Opening Ceremonies.

A documentary shows De Lima returning to Athens at age 54 to participate in the Athens Classic Marathon. The documentary chronicles his relationship with the city and his experience with the attack at the 2004 Summer Olympics.

Awards
Preceded by Fernando Meligeni	Brazilian Sportsmen of the Year; 2004	Succeeded by João Derly
Olympic Games
Preceded by Irina Rodnina and Vladislav Tretiak	Final Olympic torchbearer Rio de Janeiro 2016 along Jorge Gomes	Succeeded by Yuna Kim
Preceded by Callum Airlie, Jordan Duckitt, Desiree Henry, Katie Kirk, Cameron MacRitchie, Aidan Reynolds, and Adelle Tracey	Final Summer Olympic torchbearer Rio de Janeiro 2016 along Jorge Gomes	Succeeded by Naomi Osaka
