= Karate at the 2003 Pan American Games =

This page shows the results of the Karate Competition for men and women at the 2003 Pan American Games, held from August 1 to August 17, 2003 in Santo Domingo, Dominican Republic.

== Men's competition ==
=== Kata ===
RANK	NAME
Gold medal	Antonio Díaz (VEN)
Silver medal	Clay Morton (USA)
Bronze medal	Jurandir Andrade (BRA)
Bronze medal	Akio Tamashiro (PER)

=== Kumite (– 62 kg) ===
RANK	NAME
Gold medal	Alexis Carbajal (PER)
Silver medal	Carlos Luces (VEN)
Bronze medal	Yusei Padron (CUB)
Bronze medal	Sidirley Souza (BRA)

=== Kumite (– 68 kg) ===
RANK	NAME
Gold medal	Jean Carlos Peña (VEN)
Silver medal	Saeed Baghbani (CAN)
Bronze medal	Dionicio Gustavo (DOM)
Bronze medal	Yordanis Torres (CUB)

=== Kumite (– 74 kg) ===
RANK	NAME
Gold medal	Rubel Salomón (DOM)
Silver medal	José Ignacio Pérez (VEN)
Bronze medal	Tetsuo Alonso Murayama (MEX)
Bronze medal	Emmanuel Santana (BRA)

=== Kumite (– 80 kg) ===
RANK	NAME
Gold medal	John Fonseca (USA)
Silver medal	Nelson Sardenberg (BRA)
Bronze medal	Ricardo Pietersz (AHO)
Bronze medal	Jorge Strohmeier (PER)

=== Kumite (+ 80 kg) ===
RANK	NAME
Gold medal	Mario Toro (VEN)
Silver medal	Sterling Felix (DOM)
Bronze medal	Luis Bolívar (PER)
Bronze medal	Leandro Monzón (ARG)

== Women's competition ==
=== Kata ===
RANK	NAME
Gold medal	Yohana Sánchez (VEN)
Silver medal	Junko Arai (USA)
Bronze medal	Cíntia Lassalvia (BRA)
Bronze medal	Yessenia Reyes (ECU)

=== Kumite (– 58 kg) ===
RANK	NAME
Gold medal	Lucélia Ribeiro (BRA)
Silver medal	Molly Sánchez (PER)
Bronze medal	Cheryl Murphy (USA)
Bronze medal	Nassim Varasteh (CAN)

=== Kumite (+ 58 kg) ===
RANK	NAME
Gold medal	Heidy Rodríguez (DOM)
Silver medal	Btissama Essadiqi (CAN)
Bronze medal	Marta Embriz (MEX)
Bronze medal	Cheili González (GUA)

== Medal table ==
Place	Nation	Gold medal	Silver medal	Bronze medal	Total
1	Venezuela	4	2	0	6
2	Dominican Republic	2	1	1	4
3	United States	1	2	1	4
4	Brazil	1	1	4	6
5	Peru	1	1	3	5
6	Canada	0	2	1	3
7	Cuba	0	0	2	2
7	Mexico	0	0	2	2
8	Argentina	0	0	1	1
8	Ecuador	0	0	1	1
8	Guatemala	0	0	1	1
8	Netherlands Antilles	0	0	1	1
Total		9	9	18	36
