= Paula Baracho =

Brazilian swimmer (born 1981)

Paula Baracho / Paula Ribeiro
Personal information
- Full name: Paula Baracho Rosas Ribeiro
- Nationality: Brazil
- Born: July 31, 1981 (age 44) Recife, Pernambuco, Brazil
- Height: 1.80 m (5 ft 11 in)
- Weight: 66 kg (146 lb)

Sport
- Sport: Swimming
- Strokes: Freestyle, Backstroke
Medal record
Women's swimming
Representing Brazil
Pan American Games
Silver medal – second place	2003 Santo Domingo	4x200 m free
Bronze medal – third place	1999 Winnipeg	4x200 m free
Bronze medal – third place	2007 Rio	4x200 m free

Paula Baracho Rosas Ribeiro (born July 31, 1981 in Recife, Brazil) is a freestyle swimmer from Brazil.

== Early years ==
At eight years old, she suffered from a serious allergy, and the family doctor advised her mother to take her daughter to a pool to "unlock the nose." She left the swimming school several times, and came to volleyball coaching. Thanks to a mother's attitude, who charged your decision, Paula opted to continue swimming. Soon, got a taste for sport and began to devote herself. In 2003, she left Recife and moved to São Paulo, where she went on to defend the Esporte Clube Pinheiros.

== International career ==
At 18 years old, in 1999 Pan American Games in Winnipeg, won the bronze medal in the 4×200-metre freestyle team as a reserve.

At the 2000 FINA World Swimming Championships (25 m), in Athens, Baracho finished 9th in the 4×200-metre freestyle.

At the 2002 FINA World Swimming Championships (25 m), in Moscow, repeated the 9th place in the 4×200-metre freestyle in 2000.

Participating in the 2003 World Aquatics Championships, in Barcelona, she finished 12th in the 4×200-metre freestyle.

She won the silver medal in the women's 4×200-metre freestyle relay at the 2003 Pan American Games in Santo Domingo, Dominican Republic. breaking the South American record, with a time of 8:10.54, along with Monique Ferreira, Mariana Brochado and Ana Muniz. She also finished 4th in the 4×100-metre medley, and 7th in the 100-metre backstroke.

At the 2004 Summer Olympics, in Athens, she was in the 4×200-metre freestyle final, finishing in 7th place. At this final, broke the South American record with a time of 8:05.29, along with Joanna Maranhão, Mariana Brochado and Monique Ferreira.

She was in the 2004 FINA World Swimming Championships (25 m), in Indianapolis, where she finished 11th in the 200-metre freestyle and was in the 4×200-metre freestyle final, finishing in 6th place.

At the 2005 World Aquatics Championships, in Montreal, she finished 13th in the 4×200-metre freestyle

Participated in the 2006 FINA World Swimming Championships (25 m), in Shanghai, where she finished 34th in the 200-metre freestyle and 9th in the 4×200-metre freestyle.

In 2006, she went through a difficult period of his career. The athlete suffered several bouts of tonsillitis, which made her lose a lot of pace training. Without having expectations for a rapid recovery, Paula returned home in September 2006. In 2007, she was in third semester of Physical Education, at the Maurício de Nassau University.

At the 2007 Pan American Games, in Rio de Janeiro, Baracho won the bronze medal in the 4×200-metre freestyle. She was also ranked 8th in the 200-metre backstroke

== After professional swimming ==
In 2008, she began to move away from pools. In 2010, became swimming coach.

== See also ==
- List of South American records in swimming
