= Marcos Costa =

Brazilian boxer (born 1979)

Personal information
- Born: April 6, 1979 (age 47) Salvador, Bahia, Brazil

Sport
- Sport: Boxing
Medal record
Men's Boxing
Representing Brazil
Pan American Games
Bronze medal – third place	2003 Santo Domingo	Light welterweight

Marcos André Rocha Costa (born April 6, 1979, in ) is a boxer from Brazil, who won the bronze medal in the light welterweight division (– 64 kg) at the 2003 Pan American Games in Santo Domingo, Dominican Republic.
