= Euri González =

Dominican boxer (born 1978)

Personal information
- Nickname: Millón
- Nationality: Dominican
- Born: 13 August 1978 (age 47) Santo Domingo, Dominican Republic
- Height: 6 ft 0 in (183 cm)
- Weight: Light middleweight Welterweight

Boxing career
- Reach: 75 in (191 cm)
- Stance: Orthodox

Boxing record
- Total fights: 42
- Wins: 25
- Win by KO: 16
- Losses: 16
- Draws: 1
- No contests: 0
Medal record
Representing Dominican Republic
Pan American Games
Bronze medal – third place	2003 Santo Domingo	Welterweight

Euri Gonzalez (born 13 August 1978) is a Dominican professional boxer. He is most known for his fight with Canelo Álvarez.

== Professional career ==
Throughout his career he had won the Dominican Republic, WBO Intercontinental and WBO Latino welterweight titles, beating fellow contenders Raul Pinzon and veteran Cosme Rivera. He was ranked as high as 8th in the world by the WBO in November 2007.

On February 21, 2009 Gonzalez in front of 5,000 fans at the Auditorio Benito Juarez in Zapopan, Jalisco, Mexico lost by K.O. in the eleventh round to then-top welterweight prospect Canelo Álvarez.

=== Professional record ===
25 Wins (16 knockouts), 16 Losses, 1 Draw
Res.	Record	Opponent	Type	Rd., Time	Date	Location	Notes
Win	23-3-1	(Dominican Republic) Juan Carlos Contreras	UD	4	2015-03-21	Coliseo Pedro Julio Nolasco, La Romana, Dominican Republic	
Win	22-3-1	(Dominican Republic) Jorge Burgos	TKO	3 (6)	2013-12-07	Coliseo Pedro Julio Nolasco, La Romana, Dominican Republic	
Win	21-3-1	(Dominican Republic) Juan Carlos Lorenzo	RTD	2 (6)	2013-11-09	Coliseo Pedro Julio Nolasco, La Romana, Dominican Republic	
Loss	20-3-1	(Mexico) Jesus Soto Karass	TKO	5 (10)	2012-07-07	(United States) The Hangar, Costa Mesa, California, USA	
Loss	20-2-1	(Uzbekistan) Ravshan Hudaynazarov	UD	8	2012-06-02	(United States) Hard Rock Hotel and Casino, Las Vegas, Nevada, USA	
