= Monique Ferreira =

Brazilian swimmer (born 1980)

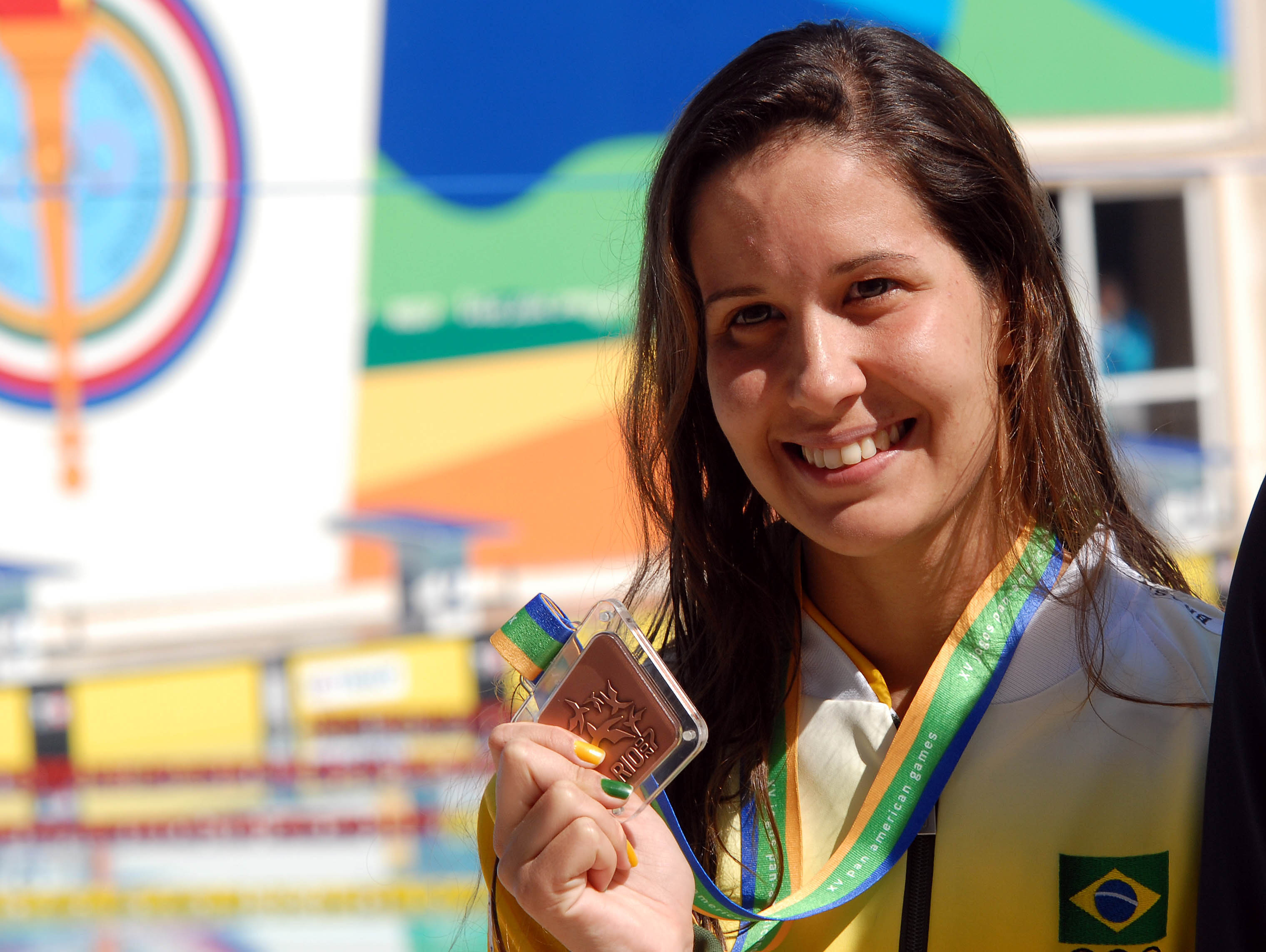
- Monique Ferreira with her Bronze at 2007 Pan

Personal information
- Full name: Monique Andrade Ferreira
- Nationality: Brazil
- Born: June 29, 1980 (age 46) Rio de Janeiro, Rio de Janeiro, Brazil
- Height: 1.65 m (5 ft 5 in)
- Weight: 50 kg (110 lb)

Sport
- Sport: Swimming
- Strokes: Freestyle
Medal record
Women's swimming
Representing Brazil
Pan American Games
Silver medal – second place	2003 Santo D.	4×200 m freestyle
Bronze medal – third place	1999 Winnipeg	4×200 m freestyle
Bronze medal – third place	2003 Santo D.	400 m freestyle
Bronze medal – third place	2003 Santo D.	4×100 m freestyle
Bronze medal – third place	2007 Rio	200 m freestyle
Bronze medal – third place	2007 Rio	4×200 m freestyle

Monique Andrade Ferreira (born 29 June 1980 in Rio de Janeiro) is a freestyle swimmer from Brazil. A member of Santos.

== International career ==
She represented her native country at the 2004 Summer Olympics in Athens, Greece, and 2008 Summer Olympics in Beijing, China, with an Olympic final in Athens in the 4×200-metre freestyle (finishing in 7th place) in the curriculum. At this final, broke the South American record with a time of 8:05.29, along with Joanna Maranhão, Mariana Brochado and Paula Baracho. She also came in 19th place in 400-metre freestyle in Athens 2004. At Beijing 2008, finished 13th in the 4×100-metre freestyle, 21st in the 400-metre freestyle, and 28th in the 200-metre freestyle.

At the 1999 Pan American Games in Winnipeg, she won the bronze medal in the 4×200-metre freestyle. She also finished 6th in the 200-metre butterfly, and 9th in the 100-metre butterfly.

Monique was in 2000 FINA World Swimming Championships (25 m), in Athens, where she finished 25th in the 200-metre freestyle and 9th in the 4×200-metre freestyle.

At the 2002 FINA World Swimming Championships (25 m), in Moscow, finished 21st in the 200-metre freestyle, 10th in the 400-metre freestyle and 9th in the 4×200-metre freestyle

She swam at the 2002 Pan Pacific Swimming Championships, where she finished 5th in the 4×200-metre freestyle, 6th in the 4×100-metre freestyle, 7th in the 400-metre freestyle, and 12th in the 200-metre freestyle.

Participating in the 2003 World Aquatics Championships in Barcelona, she got the 21st place in the 200-metre freestyle, 27th in the 400-metre freestyle, and 12th place in the 4×200-metre freestyle.

At the 2003 Pan American Games, in Santo Domingo, won the silver medal in the 4×200-metre freestyle, breaking the South American record, with a time of 8:10.54, along with Ana Muniz, Mariana Brochado, Paula Baracho She also won two bronze medals in the 400-metre freestyle, and in the 4×100-metre freestyle.

At the 2005 World Aquatics Championships, she finished 26th in the 200-metre freestyle, 25th in the 400-metre freestyle and 13th in the 4×200-metre freestyle.

She was in the 2006 FINA World Swimming Championships (25 m), where she placed 31st in the 200-metre freestyle, was disqualified in the 400-metre freestyle and got 9th place in the 4×200-metre freestyle.

At the 2007 Pan American Games, the Rio de Janeiro, Monique won the bronze medal in the 200-metre freestyle and in the 4×200-metre freestyle. Monique also would have won the silver medal in the 4×100-metre freestyle, but this medal was revoked by Rebeca Gusmão's doping.

She was South American record holder in the 4×100-metre freestyle, with a time of 3:42.85, on August 9, 2008, along with Tatiana Lemos, Flávia Delaroli and Michelle Lenhardt.

== After professional swimming ==
She ended her career in December 2011. Later, she went to work at COB.
