= Taekwondo at the 2003 Pan American Games =

The results of the Taekwondo Competition for men and women at the 2003 Pan American Games, held from August 13 to August 16, 2003, in Santo Domingo, Dominican Republic. There were a total number of 53 male and 45 female competitors.

== Men's competition ==
=== – 58 kg ===
RANK	NAME
Gold medal	Tim Thackrey (USA)
Silver medal	Oscar Salazar (MEX)
Bronze medal	Kristian Meléndez (PUR)
Bronze medal	Gabriel Mercedes (DOM)

=== – 68 kg ===
RANK	NAME
Gold medal	Luis Benítez (DOM)
Silver medal	Yosvani Pérez (CUB)
Bronze medal	Erick Osornio (MEX)
Bronze medal	Diogo Silva (BRA)

=== – 80 kg ===
RANK	NAME
Gold medal	Steven López (USA)
Silver medal	José Luis Ramírez (MEX)
Bronze medal	Darío Coria (ARG)
Bronze medal	Eddy Antonio Luna (DOM)

=== + 80 kg ===
RANK	NAME
Gold medal	Víctor Estrada (MEX)
Silver medal	Rowell Pier Jérez (DOM)
Bronze medal	Walassi Aires (BRA)
Bronze medal	Sanon Tudor (HAI)

== Women's competition ==
=== – 49 kg ===
RANK	NAME
Gold medal	Yanelis Labrada (CUB)
Silver medal	Dalia Contreras (VEN)
Bronze medal	Euda María Carias (GUA)
Bronze medal	Carmen Morales (MEX)

=== – 57 kg ===
RANK	NAME
Gold medal	Iridia Salazar (MEX)
Silver medal	Dinanyiris Furcal (DOM)
Bronze medal	Nia Abdallah (USA)
Bronze medal	Elizabeth Franco (ECU)

=== – 67 kg ===
RANK	NAME
Gold medal	Yaneth Leal (VEN)
Silver medal	Vanina Sánchez (ARG)
Bronze medal	Simona Hradil (USA)
Bronze medal	Marien Ramírez (MEX)

=== + 67 kg ===
RANK	NAME
Gold medal	Gina María Ruiz (DOM)
Silver medal	Adriana Carmona (VEN)
Bronze medal	Patricia Riccautti (ARG)
Bronze medal	Sanaz Shabazi (USA)

== Medal table ==
Place	Nation	Gold medal	Silver medal	Bronze medal	Total
1	Mexico	2	2	3	7
2	Dominican Republic	2	2	2	6
3	United States	2	0	3	5
4	Venezuela	1	2	0	3
5	Cuba	1	1	0	2
6	Argentina	0	1	2	3
7	Brazil	0	0	2	2
8	Ecuador	0	0	1	1
8	Guatemala	0	0	1	1
8	Haiti	0	0	1	1
8	Puerto Rico	0	0	1	1
Total		8	8	16	32

== See also ==
- Taekwondo at the 2004 Summer Olympics
