= Márcia Narloch =

Brazilian long-distance runner

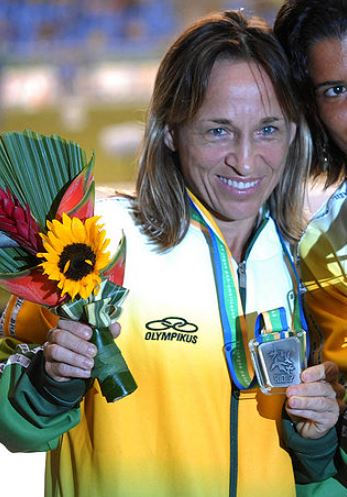
- Narloch in 2007

Personal information
- Born: 28 March 1969 (age 57) Joinville, Brazil

Sport
- Sport: Track and field
Medal record
Representing Brazil
Women's athletics
Pan American Games
Gold medal – first place	2003 Santo Domingo	Marathon
Silver medal – second place	2007 Rio de Janeiro	Marathon

Márcia Narloch (born 28 March 1969 in Joinville) is a female marathon runner from Brazil, who won the gold medal in the women's marathon at the 2003 Pan American Games. She represented her native country in three consecutive Summer Olympics, starting in 1992 (Barcelona, Spain).
