= James Pereira =

Brazilian boxer (born 1983)

Personal information
- Born: July 17, 1983 (age 42)
Medal record
Men's Boxing
Representing Brazil
Pan American Games
Bronze medal – third place	2003 Santo Domingo	Flyweight
Bronze medal – third place	2007 Rio de Janeiro	Bantamweight
South American Games
Gold medal – first place	2002 Belém	Flyweight

James Dean Pereira (born July 17, 1983 in Maranhão) is a boxer from Brazil, who won the bronze medal in the flyweight division (– 51 kg) at the 2003 Pan American Games in Santo Domingo, Dominican Republic.

He added another bronze at bantamweight at the 2007 PanAm Games after losing to eventual winner Carlos Cuadras in the semifinal.
