= Guatemala at the 2003 Pan American Games =

- IOC code: GUA
- NOC: Comité Olímpico Guatemalteco
- Website: www.cog.org.gt

in Santo Domingo 1–17 August 2003
- Flag bearer: Juan Carlos Guevara
- Medals Ranked 18th: Gold 0 Silver 3 Bronze 9 Total 12

Pan American Games appearances (overview)
- 1951; 1955; 1959; 1963; 1967; 1971; 1975; 1979; 1983; 1987; 1991; 1995; 1999; 2003; 2007; 2011; 2015; 2019; 2023

Other related appearances
- Independent Athletes Team (2023)

Guatemala sent a delegation to 14th Pan American Games in Santo Domingo, Dominican Republic, from 1–17 August 2003. At the Games, Guatemala garnered a total number of 12 medals: 3 silver and 9 bronze.

== Medals ==
=== Silver ===
===== Badminton =====
- Men's doubles: Pedro Yang and Erick Anguiano

===== Bowling =====
- Women's singles: Sofia Granda

===== Cycling =====
- Women's points race: María Molina de Ortíz

=== Bronze ===
===== Athletics =====
- Men's 50 km race walk: Luis Fernando García

===== Badminton =====
- Men's singles: Pedro Yang

===== Karate =====
- Women's Kumite (+58 kg): Cheili González

===== Sailing =====
- Mixed Hobie 16: Juan Ignacio Maegli and Andrés López

===== Swimming =====
- Women's 100 m backstroke: Gisela Morales
- Women's 200 m backstroke: Gisela Morales

===== Taekwondo =====
- Women's −49 kg: Euda María Carias

== Results by event ==
=== Athletics ===
Track

Athlete	Event	Heat		Final	
Athlete	Event	Time	Rank	Time	Rank
Elsa Monterroso	Women's 1,500 m	—	—	4:46.53	11
Elsa Monterroso	Women's 5,000 m	—	—	17:13.72	8
José Amado García	Men's 10,000 m	—	—	30:26.61	7
Elsa Monterroso	Women's 10,000 m	—	—	36:24.23	7

Road

Athlete	Event	Time	Rank
Alfredo Arévalo	Men's marathon	DNF	—
Luis Fernando García	Men's 20 km race walk	DNF	—
Julio René Martínez	Men's 20 km race walk	DSQ	—
Teresita Collado	Women's 20 km race walk	1:39:18	7
Luis Fernando García	Men's 50 km race walk	4:12:14	3rd place, bronze medalist(s)
Julio René Martínez	Men's 50 km race walk	DNF	—

Field

Athlete	Event	Throws						Total	
Athlete	Event	1	2	3	4	5	6	Distance	Rank
Raúl Rivera	Men's hammer throw	X	65.06	X	63.95	63.23	X	65.06 m	6

Decathlon

Athlete	Decathlon										Total	
Athlete	1	2	3	4	5	6	7	8	9	10	Points	Rank
Octavius Gillespie	11.48	5.58	12.35	1.98	—	—	—	—	—	—	DNF	—

=== Boxing ===
Athlete	Event	Round of 16	Quarterfinals	Semifinals	Final
Athlete	Event	Opposition Result	Opposition Result	Opposition Result	Opposition Result
Eddie Valenzuela	Flyweight	Acosta (ARG); L 7-13	did not advance		
Castulo González	Bantamweight	López (PUR); L 10-27	did not advance		
Eddy Monzón	Lightweight	González (NCA); L 8-16	did not advance		

=== Cycling ===
Mountain bike

- Edvin Barrios

- Men's cross country — +1 lap (→ 7th place)

- Anabella López

- Women's cross country — +1 lap (→ 9th place)

=== Triathlon ===
Athlete	Event	Race			Total	
Athlete	Event	Swim	Bike	Run	Time	Rank
Carlos Friely	Men's individual	23:12.500	1:00:29.400	37:01.000	02:01:48	22

== See also ==
- Guatemala at the 2004 Summer Olympics
