= Canada at the 2003 Pan American Games =

- IOC code: CAN
- NOC: Canadian Olympic Committee

in Santo Domingo 1–17 August 2003
- Flag bearer: Jaret Llewellyn
- Medals Ranked 3rd: Gold 29 Silver 57 Bronze 42 Total 128

Pan American Games appearances (overview)
- 1955; 1959; 1963; 1967; 1971; 1975; 1979; 1983; 1987; 1991; 1995; 1999; 2003; 2007; 2011; 2015; 2019; 2023; 2027

Canada participated at the 2003 Pan American Games, held in Santo Domingo, Dominican Republic, from 1 to 17 August 2003.

== Medals ==
=== Gold ===
===== Athletics =====
- Men's 800 metres: Achraf Tadili
- Men's discus throw: Jason Tunks
- Women's long jump: Alice Falaiye

===== Badminton =====
- Men's singles: Mike Beres
- Women's doubles: Charmaine Reid and Helen Nichol
- Mixed doubles: Denyse Julien and Philippe Bourret

===== Canoeing =====
- Men's C-1 1000 m: Tom Hall
- Women's K-4 500 m: Jennifer Adamson, Jillian D'Alessio, Emille Fournel and Victoria Tuttle

===== Cycling =====
- Women's points race: Clara Hughes

===== Diving =====
- Men's 3 m springboard: Alexandre Despatie
- Men's 3 m synchronized springboard: Alexandre Despatie and Philippe Comtois
- Men's 10 m synchronized platform: Alexandre Despatie and Philippe Comtois
- Women's 3 m springboard: Blythe Hartley
- Women's 10 m platform: Émilie Heymans
- Women's 3 m synchronized springboard: Émilie Heymans and Blythe Hartley
- Women's 10 m synchronized platform: Émilie Heymans and Marie-Ève Marleau

===== Equestrian =====
- Dressage individual: Leslie Reid

=== Silver ===
===== Athletics =====
- Men's marathon: Bruce Deacon
- Men's 3000 m steeplechase: Joël Bourgeois
- Women's 100 m hurdles: Perdita Felicien
- Women's heptathlon: Nicole Haynes

===== Badminton =====
- Men's singles: Andrew Dabeka
- Women's singles: Anna Rice
- Women's doubles: Denyse Julien and Anna Rice
- Mixed doubles: Patrick Jody and Mike Beres

===== Bowling =====
- Men's doubles: George Lambert and Danyck Brière

===== Canoeing =====
- Men's C-1 500 m: Scott Dickey
- Women's K-2 500 m: Emille Fournel and Victoria Tuttle

===== Cycling =====
- Women's individual road time trial: Clara Hughes

===== Diving =====
- Women's 3 m springboard: Émilie Heymans

===== Equestrian =====
- Dressage team: Evi Strasser, Jacqueline Brooks, Ashley Holzer and Leslie Reid

===== Fencing =====
- Women's épée individual: Sherraine Schalm

===== Football =====
- Women's tournament: Canada

===== Karate =====
- Men's Kumite (68 kg): Saeed Baghbani
- Women's Kumite (+58 kg): Btissama Essadiqi

===== Racquetball =====
- Men's singles: Mike Green

===== Water polo =====
- Women's tournament: national team

=== Bronze ===
===== Athletics =====
- Men's 100 metres: Anson Henry
- Men's shot put: Bradley Snyder
- Women's pole vault: Stephanie McCann

===== Badminton =====
- Men's singles: Kyle Hunter
- Men's doubles: Kyle Hunter and Mike Beres

===== Boxing =====
- Men's bantamweight (54 kg): Andrew Kooner
- Men's middleweight (75 kg): Jean Pascal
- Men's heavyweight (91 kg): Jason Douglas

===== Canoeing =====
- Men's K-1 500 m: Mark de Jonge
- Men's C-2 500 m: Ian Mortimer and Tom Hall
- Women's K-1 500 m: Jillian D'Alessio

===== Cycling =====
- Women's individual pursuit: Clara Hughes

===== Diving =====
- Men's 10 m platform: Alexandre Despatie
- Women's 10 m platform: Blythe Hartley

===== Fencing =====
- Men's sabre individual: Michel Boulos
- Women's épée team: Sherraine Schalm, Catherine Dunnette and Marie-Ève Pelletier

===== Karate =====
- Women's Kumite (58 kg): Nassim Varasteh

===== Racquetball =====
- Men's doubles: Corey Osborne and François Viens
- Women's singles: Lori-Jane Powell
- Women's doubles: Josée Grand'Maître and Julie Neubauer

===== Water polo =====
- Men's tournament: national team

== Results by event ==
=== Athletics ===
Track

Athlete	Event	Heat		Final	
Athlete	Event	Time	Rank	Time	Rank
Anson Henry	Men's 100 m	10.60	7	10.30	3rd place, bronze medalist(s)
Malindi Elmore	Women's 1500 m	—	—	4:10.42	4
Adam Kunkel	Men's 400 m hurdles	50.00	4	50.43	7
Joël Bourgeois	Men's 3000 m steeplechase	—	—	8:36.78	2nd place, silver medalist(s)
David Milne	Men's 3000 m steeplechase	—	—	8:59.37	6

Road

Athlete	Event	Time	Rank
Bruce Deacon	Men's marathon	2:20:25	2nd place, silver medalist(s)

Field

Athlete	Event	Throws						Total	
Athlete	Event	1	2	3	4	5	6	Distance	Rank
Jennifer Joyce	Women's hammer throw	55.51	X	X	—	—	—	55.51 m	9
Jason Tunks	Men's discus throw	63.70	63.14	62.12	61.93	61.68	63.67	63.70 m	1st place, gold medalist(s)
Eric Forshaw	Men's discus throw	56.74	56.27	57.42	56.84	55.49	X	57.42 m	7
Bradley Snyder	Men's shot put	19.48	19.67	20.10	X	19.99	X	20.10 m	3rd place, bronze medalist(s)

Heptathlon

Athlete	Heptathlon							Total	
Athlete	1	2	3	4	5	6	7	Points	Rank
Nicole Haynes	14.03	1.74	14.87	26.04	5.89	48.40	2:21.65	5959	2nd place, silver medalist(s)

=== Basketball ===
==== Men's tournament ====
- Randy Nohr
- Rowan Barrett
- Prosper Karangwa
- Greg Newton
- Shawn Swords
- Novell Thomas
- Jesse Young
- Peter Guarasci
- Greg Francis
- Andy Kwiatkowski
- Juan Mendez
- Mike King

Head coach:

- Jay Triano

==== Women's tournament ====
- Cal Bouchard
- Claudia Brassard
- Leighann Doan
- Carolyn Ganes
- Isabelle Grenier
- Michelle Hendry
- Nikki Johnson
- Teresa Kliendienst
- Susan Murray
- Dianne Norman
- Kim Smith
- Shona Thorburn

Head coach:

- Allison McNeill

=== Boxing ===
Athlete	Event	Round of 16	Quarterfinals	Semifinals	Final
Athlete	Event	Opposition Result	Opposition Result	Opposition Result	Opposition Result
Dominic Longpre	Light flyweight	Serrano (PUR); L 9–18	did not advance		
Sébastien Gauthier	Flyweight	Bye	Pereira (BRA); L 16–20	did not advance	
Andrew Kooner	Bantamweight	Bye	Guillermo (USA); W 37–13	Rigondeaux (CUB); L 2–22 → (bronze)	did not advance
Benoît Gaudet	Featherweight	Tadeo (ECU); W 14–5	Batista (DOM); W 18–6	Ramos (COL); L 11–13 → (bronze)	did not advance
Adam Trupish	Welterweight	Conceição (BRA); W 10–9	González (DOM); L 19–25	did not advance	
Jason Douglas	Heavyweight	Bye	Grant (GRN); W RSC–1	Solis (CUB); L 2–16 → (bronze)	did not advance

=== Swimming ===
==== Men's competitions ====
Athlete	Event	Heat		Final	
Athlete	Event	Time	Rank	Time	Rank
Matt Rose	50 m freestyle	22.80	6	22.89	7
Matt Rose	100 m freestyle	50.91	7	50.75	8
Colin Russell	100 m freestyle	51.35	10	51.57	10

==== Women's competitions ====
Athlete	Event	Heat		Final	
Athlete	Event	Time	Rank	Time	Rank
Elizabeth Collins	200 m freestyle	2:04.06	4	2:02.26	4
Maya Beaudry	200 m freestyle	2:05.10	8	2:03.38	8
Julie Gravelle	400 m freestyle	4:18.30	3	4:14.85	4
Maya Beaudry	400 m freestyle	4:24.45	10	4:21.57	9
Julie Gravelle	800 m freestyle	—		8:45.82	4
Maya Beaudry	800 m freestyle	—		9:01.61	7

=== Triathlon ===
Athlete	Event	Race			Total	
Athlete	Event	Swim	Bike	Run	Time	Rank
Brent McMahon	Men's individual	19:58.800	57:46.000	36:14.200	01:54:46	8
Paul Tichelaar	Men's individual	20:02.100	57:13.800	40:40.400	01:58:52	18
Sean Bechtel	Men's individual	20:01.900	57:13.300	42:05.500	02:00:17	20
Jill Savege	Women's individual	18:33.600	1:02:16.800	37:38.700	01:59:30	1st place, gold medalist(s)
Gillian Moody	Women's individual	19:53.900	1:04:08.800	39:32.700	02:03:35	7
Natasha Filliol	Women's individual	21:11.100	1:06:27.600	38:26.600	02:06:05	10

== See also ==
- Canada at the 2004 Summer Olympics
