= Athletics at the 2003 Pan American Games =

- Dates: 5 – 9 August
- Host city: Santo Domingo, Dominican Republic
- Venue: Estadio Olímpico Félix Sánchez
- Level: Senior
- Events: 46
- Participation: 535 athletes from 39 nations

The athletics competition at the 2003 Pan American Games was held in Santo Domingo, Dominican Republic, from Tuesday, August 5, to Saturday, August 9, 2003. The competition comprised track and field events plus marathon races and three racewalking events, with a total of 46 contests taking place.

== Men's results ==
=== Track ===
Event	Gold		Silver		Bronze	
100 m	Michael Frater; Jamaica	10.21	Mardy Scales; United States	10.22	Anson Henry; Canada	10.30
100 m	Wind: +0.7					
200 m	Kenneth Brokenburr; United States	20.42	Christopher Williams; Jamaica	20.54	André Domingos; Brazil	20.68
200 m	Wind: +0.6					
400 m	Mitch Potter; United States	45.11	Yeimer López; Cuba	45.13	Alleyne Francique; Grenada	45.51
800 m	Achraf Tadili; Canada	1:45.05	Osmar dos Santos; Brazil	1:45.64	Fabiano Peçanha; Brazil	1:46.39
1500 m	Hudson de Souza; Brazil	3:45.72	Michael Stember; United States	3:46.31	Grant Robison; United States	3:46.68
5000 m	Hudson de Souza; Brazil	13:50.71	José David Galván; Mexico	13:52.92	Marílson dos Santos; Brazil	13:56.90
10000 m	Teodoro Vega; Mexico	28:49.38	Marílson dos Santos; Brazil	28:49.48	Dan Browne; United States	29:06.23
Marathon	Vanderlei de Lima; Brazil	2:19:08	Bruce Deacon; Canada	2:20:35	Diego Colorado; Colombia	2:21:48
3000 m steeplechase	Néstor Nieves; Venezuela	8:34.26	Joël Bourgeois; Canada	8:36.78	Anthony Famiglietti; United States	8:40.22
110 m hurdles	Yuniel Hernández; Cuba	13.35	Larry Wade; United States	13.35	Márcio de Souza; Brazil	13.45
110 m hurdles	Wind: -0.2					
400 m hurdles	Félix Sánchez; Dominican Republic	48.19	Eric Thomas; United States	48.74	Dean Griffiths; Jamaica	49.35
20 km race walk	Jefferson Pérez; Ecuador	1:23:06	Bernardo Segura; Mexico	1:23:31	Alejandro López; Mexico	1:24:33
50 km race walk	Germán Sánchez; Mexico	4:05:01	Mário dos Santos; Brazil	4:07:36	Luis Fernando García; Guatemala	4:12:14
4 × 100 m relay	Brazil; Vicente de Lima; Edson Ribeiro; André da Silva; Claudinei da Silva	38.44	Trinidad and Tobago; Niconnor Alexander; Marc Burns; Ato Boldon; Darrel Brown	38.53	Cuba; José Ángel César; José Carlos Peña; Luis Alexander Reyes; Juan Pita	39.09
4 × 400 m relay	Jamaica; Michael Campbell; Sanjay Ayre; Lansford Spence; Davian Clarke	3:01.81	United States; Mitchell Potter; Ja'Warren Hooker; Adam Steele; James Davis	3:01.87	Dominican Republic; Arismendy Peguero; Carlos Santa; Julio Vidal; Félix Sánchez	3:02.02; NR
WR world record | AR area record | CR championship record | GR games record | NR national record | OR Olympic record | PB personal best | SB season best | WL world leading (in a given season)

=== Field ===
Event	Gold		Silver		Bronze	
High jump	Germaine Mason; Jamaica	2.34	Jamie Nieto; United States	2.28	Terrance Woods; United States	2.22
Pole vault	Toby Stevenson; United States	5.45	Russ Buller; United States	5.40	Dominic Johnson; Saint Lucia	5.40
Long jump	Iván Pedroso; Cuba	8.23	Luis Felipe Méliz; Cuba	8.20	Víctor Castillo; Venezuela	7.98
Triple jump	Yoandri Betanzos; Cuba	17.26	Jadel Gregório; Brazil	17.03	Yoelbi Quesada; Cuba	16.78
Shot put	Reese Hoffa; United States	20.95	Marco Antonio Verni; Chile	20.14	Bradley Snyder; Canada	20.10
Discus throw	Jason Tunks; Canada	63.70	Frank Casañas; Cuba	62.61	Loy Martínez; Cuba	61.36
Hammer throw	Juan Ignacio Cerra; Argentina	75.53	James Parker; United States	74.35	Yosvany Suárez; Cuba	70.24
Javelin throw	Emeterio González; Cuba	81.72	Isbel Luaces; Cuba	80.95	Breaux Greer; United States	79.21
Decathlon	Stephen Moore; United States	7809 pts	Luiggy Llanos; Puerto Rico	7704 pts (NR)	Yonelvis Águila; Cuba	7593 pts
WR world record | AR area record | CR championship record | GR games record | NR national record | OR Olympic record | PB personal best | SB season best | WL world leading (in a given season)

== Women's results ==
=== Track ===
Event	Gold		Silver		Bronze	
100 m	Lauryn Williams; United States	11.12	Angela Williams; United States	11.15	Liliana Allen; Mexico	11.28
100 m	Wind: +1.6					
200 m	Roxana Díaz; Cuba	22.69	Cydonie Mothersille; Cayman Islands	22.86	Allyson Felix; United States	22.93
200 m	Wind: +1.3					
400 m	Ana Guevara; Mexico	50.36	Hazel-Ann Regis; Grenada	51.56	Aliann Pompey; Guyana	52.06
800 m	Adriana Muñoz; Cuba	2:02.56	Marian Burnett; Guyana	2:03.58	Christiane dos Santos; Brazil	2:04.37
1500 m	Adriana Muñoz; Cuba	4:09.57	Mary Jayne Harrelson; United States	4:09.72	Mardrea Hyman; Jamaica	4:10.08
5000 m	Adriana Fernández; Mexico	15:30.65	Nora Rocha; Mexico	15:40.98	Nicole Jefferson; United States	15:42.40
10000 m	Adriana Fernández; Mexico	33:16.05	Yudelkis Martínez; Cuba	33:55.12	Bertha Sánchez; Colombia	33:56.17
Marathon	Márcia Narloch; Brazil	2:39:54	Mariela González; Cuba	2:42:55	Erika Olivera; Chile	2:44:52
100 m hurdles	Brigitte Foster; Jamaica	12.67	Perdita Felicien; Canada	12.70	Lacena Golding-Clarke; Jamaica	12.79
100 m hurdles	Wind: -0.3					
400 m hurdles	Joanna Hayes; United States	54.77	Daimí Pernía; Cuba	55.10	Andrea Blackett; Barbados	55.24
20 km race walk	Victoria Palacios; Mexico	1:35:16	Rosario Sánchez; Mexico	1:35:21	Joanne Dow; United States	1:35:48
4 × 100 m relay	United States; Angela Williams; Consuella Moore; Angela Daigle; Lauryn Williams	43.06	Cuba; Dainelky Pérez; Roxana Díaz; Virgen Benavides; Misleidys Lazo	43.40	Jamaica; Lacena Golding-Clarke; Judyth Kitson; Shellene Williams; Danielle Browning	43.71
4 × 400 m relay	United States; Me'Lisa Barber; Moushaumi Robinson; Julian Clay; De'Hashia Trotter	3:26.40	Jamaica; Naleya Downer; Michelle Burgher; Novlene Williams; Allison Beckford	3:27.34	Brazil; Maria Laura Almirão; Josiane Tito; Geisa Coutinho; Lucimar Teodoro	3:28.07
WR world record | AR area record | CR championship record | GR games record | NR national record | OR Olympic record | PB personal best | SB season best | WL world leading (in a given season)

=== Field ===
Event	Gold		Silver		Bronze	
High jump	Juana Arrendel; Dominican Republic	1.94	Romary Rifka; Mexico	1.94	Yarianny Argüelles; Cuba	1.89
Pole vault	Melissa Mueller; United States	4.40	Carolina Torres; Chile	4.30	Stephanie McCann; Canada	4.20
Long jump	Alice Falaiye; Canada	6.43	Jackie Edwards; Bahamas	6.41	Yargelis Savigne; Cuba	6.40
Triple jump	Mabel Gay; Cuba	14.42	Yuliana Pérez; United States	13.99	Yusmay Bicet; Cuba	13.90
Shot put	Yumileidi Cumbá; Cuba	19.31	Elisângela Adriano; Brazil	18.48	Fior Vásquez; Dominican Republic	18.14; NR
Discus throw	Aretha Hill; United States	63.30	Anaelys Fernández; Cuba	61.26	Yania Ferrales; Cuba	60.03
Hammer throw	Yipsi Moreno; Cuba	74.25	Yunaika Crawford; Cuba	69.57	Candice Scott; Trinidad and Tobago	69.06
Javelin throw	Kim Kreiner; United States	60.86	Laverne Eve; Bahamas	60.68	Osleidys Menéndez; Cuba	60.20
Heptathlon	Tiffany Lott-Hogan; United States	6064 pts	Nicole Haynes; Canada	5959 pts	Magalys García; Cuba	5864 pts
WR world record | AR area record | CR championship record | GR games record | NR national record | OR Olympic record | PB personal best | SB season best | WL world leading (in a given season)

== Medal table ==
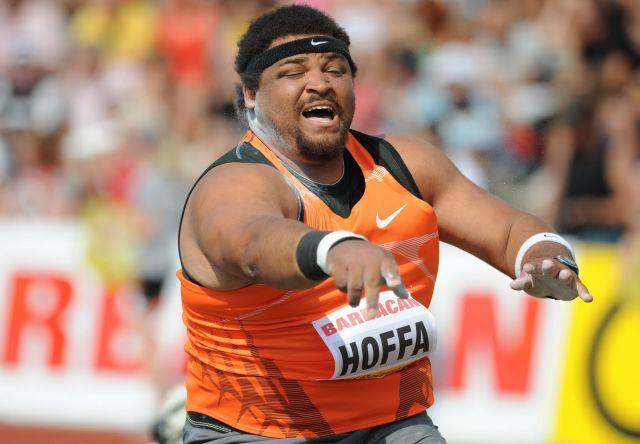
Shot putter Reese Hoffa was one of 13 event winners from the US.

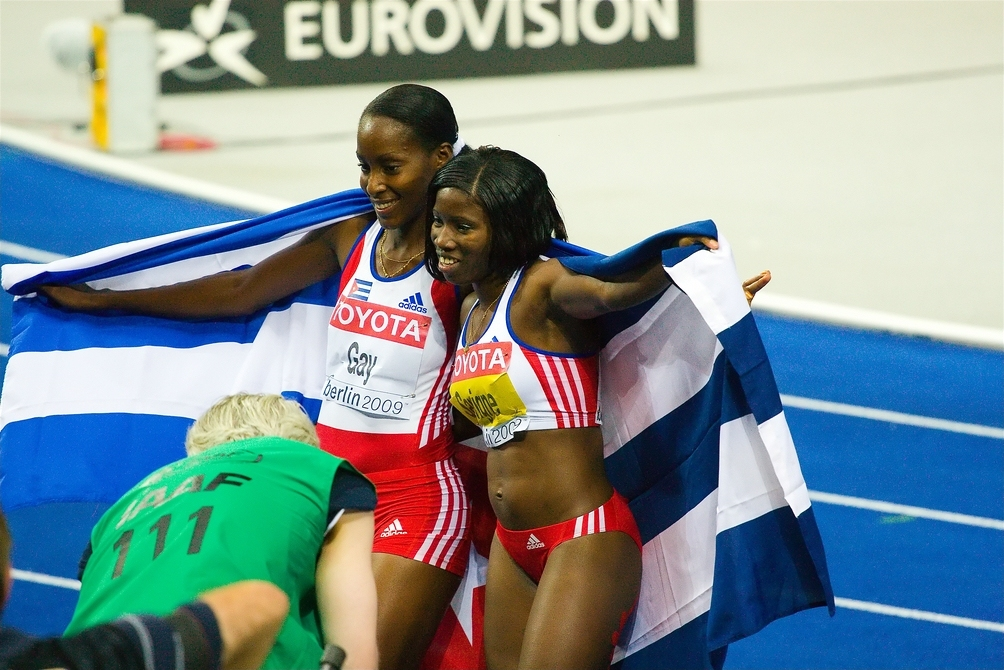
Mabel Gay (left) and Yargelis Savigne won medals for Cuba in the jumps.

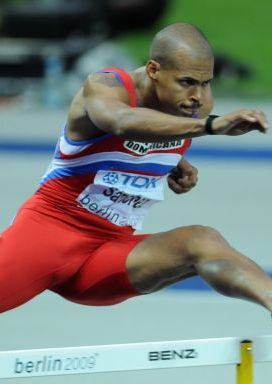
Félix Sánchez took one of two golds for hosts the Dominican Republic.

* Host nation (Dominican Republic)

Rank	Nation	Gold	Silver	Bronze	Total
1	United States	13	11	8	32
2	Cuba	10	10	11	31
3	Mexico	6	5	2	13
4	Brazil	5	5	6	16
5	Jamaica	4	2	4	10
6	Canada	3	4	3	10
7	Dominican Republic*	2	0	2	4
8	Venezuela	1	0	1	2
9	Argentina	1	0	0	1
9	Ecuador	1	0	0	1
11	Chile	0	2	1	3
12	Bahamas	0	2	0	2
13	Grenada	0	1	1	2
13	Guyana	0	1	1	2
13	Trinidad and Tobago	0	1	1	2
16	Cayman Islands	0	1	0	1
16	Puerto Rico	0	1	0	1
18	Colombia	0	0	2	2
19	Barbados	0	0	1	1
19	Guatemala	0	0	1	1
19	Saint Lucia	0	0	1	1
Totals (21 entries)		46	46	46	138

== Participating nations ==
- Antigua and Barbuda (3)
- Argentina (10)
- Bahamas (20)
- Barbados (7)
- Belize (6)
- Bermuda (4)
- Bolivia (5)
- Brazil (34)
- British Virgin Islands (1)
- Canada (21)
- Cayman Islands (5)
- Chile (14)
- Colombia (22)
- Cuba (55)
- Dominica (4)
- Dominican Republic (41)
- Ecuador (12)
- Grenada (8)
- Guatemala (11)
- Guyana (2)
- Haiti (8)
- Honduras (1)
- Jamaica (34)
- Mexico (32)
- Netherlands Antilles (4)
- Nicaragua (3)
- Paraguay (4)
- Peru (5)
- Puerto Rico (13)
- Saint Kitts and Nevis (5)
- Saint Lucia (3)
- Saint Vincent and the Grenadines (5)
- El Salvador (1)
- Suriname (1)
- Trinidad and Tobago (19)
- United States (90)
- United States Virgin Islands (4)
- Uruguay (3)
- Venezuela (15)
