= 2003 Pan American Games =

14th edition of the Pan American Games

XIV Pan American Games
- Host: Santo Domingo, Dominican Republic
- Nations: 42
- Athletes: 5,223
- Events: 338 in 35 sports
- Opening: August 1
- Closing: August 17
- Opened by: President Hipólito Mejía
- Cauldron lighter: Luis Pujols
- Main venue: Félix Sánchez Olympic Stadium

The 2003 Pan American Games, officially the XIV Pan American Games (Spanish: XIV Juegos Panamericanos) and commonly known as Santo Domingo 2003, were held in Santo Domingo, Dominican Republic, from August 1 to 17, 2003. The successful bid for the Games was made in the mid-1990s, when Dominican Republic had one of the highest growth rates in Latin America.

All 42 PASO countries and over 5,223 athletes pre-registered for participation in the XIV Pan American Games. An additional 2,425 trainers and delegates attended. The United States pre-registered the most athletes (713) and Saint Lucia entered the least (6). The host country entered 562 athletes.

== Bids ==
In December 1998, in Panama City, Panama, Santo Domingo beat Guadalajara, Mexico, and Medellín, Colombia, in the voting to host the Games. Guadalajara went on to host the 2011 Pan American Games.

2003 Pan American Games bidding results
| City | NOC | Round 1 | Round 2 |
| Santo Domingo | Dominican Republic | 24 | 28 |
| Guadalajara | Mexico | 21 | 24 |
| Medellín | Colombia | 6 | — |

== Games highlights ==
=== Opening ceremony ===
The games opened at Estadio Olímpico Félix Sánchez before a crowd of 48,000. The exhibition featured some 10,000 performers, some dressed in costumes ranging from skeletons to men in tuxedoes and top hats, typifying a Dominican carnival

Local baseball heroes Juan Marichal and Pedro Martínez were on hand for the ceremony. They completed the final lap of the torch and with Luis Pujols, the nephew of the San Francisco Giants coach of the same name, dressed in a Dominican baseball uniform, swung a bat at a baseball sitting atop the mini-flame which triggered the cauldron.

The ceremony also was attended by then-President of the Dominican Republic Hipólito Mejía, Pan American Sports Organization president Mario Vázquez Raña and New York Mayor Michael Bloomberg.

=== Budget and venues ===
The Dominican Republic spent at least $175 million for the 17-day sporting event. Two Olympic parks were renewed or built, the Centro Olímpico Juan Pablo Duarte and Parque del Este complex. Laborers were forced to work right up until the opening ceremony because of construction delays, electrical blackouts, and questionable venue quality. In the end, the Dominican Republic refurbished existing sites and produced beautiful new facilities.

Although a few logistical incidents occurred (a team was unable to shower when the athletes village lacked water, teams were missing tennis balls or towels), U.S. team chief Roland Betts, commented "At times it has been a great struggle, but we are very excited and proud to see the venues. I believe these venues are as good as or better than any that have been created for the Pan American Games." Other attendees agreed that logistical and venue problems declined greatly during the Games.

- Map of Olympic park
- Map of East venues

=== Concerns and controversies ===
Numerous protest marches were staged to call attention to austerity measures, including import taxes and spending cuts, and neglect of impoverished areas. During the Games, the protests were banned from the city. However, the Dominicans warmly embraced the Games with pride, especially when local heroes such as Félix Sánchez won the first local gold medal at the 400-meter hurdles and broke the Pan Am record at the games first week.While praising the first-rate facilities, critics decried the huge cost overruns, the high payroll of the organizers, and concerns over the Dominican Republic's ability to maintain the venues after the Games.

== Medal count ==
| ^{1} | Host nation |

To sort this table by nation, total medal count, or any other column, click on the icon next to the column title.

| Rank | Nation | Gold | Silver | Bronze | Total |
|---|---|---|---|---|---|
| 1 | United States ^{a} | 118 | 80 | 73 | 271/270/269 |
| 2 | Cuba | 72 | 41 | 39 | 152 |
| 3 | Canada ^{a} | 29 | 57 | 42/41 | 128/127 |
| 4 | Brazil | 29 | 40 | 54 | 123 |
| 5 | Mexico ^{a} | 20 | 27 | 32/31 | 79/78 |

Note

The medal counts for the United States, Canada and Mexico are disputed.

== Sports ==
The 2003 games marked the return of basque pelota and waterskiing to the Games.

- Archery
- Athletics
- Badminton
- Baseball
- Basketball
- Basque Pelota
- Bowling
- Boxing
- Canoeing
- Cycling
- Diving
- Equestrian
- Fencing
- Field hockey
- Football
- Gymnastics
- Handball
- Judo
- Karate
- Modern pentathlon
- Racquetball
- Roller sports
- Rowing
- Sailing
- Shooting
- Softball
- Squash
- Swimming
- Synchronized swimming
- Table tennis
- Taekwondo
- Tennis
- Triathlon
- Volleyball
- Water polo
- Water skiing
- Weightlifting
- Wrestling

== Media ==
The 2003 Games' mascot was a tank top clad manatee named Tito.Television broadcasts of the games were produced by Paul Graham.

== 2003 Parapan American Games ==
In 2003, Parapan American Games was not hosted in Santo Domingo, but rather in Mar del Plata, Argentina. The event featured 1,500 athletes from 28 countries competed in nine sporting events. This was the 2nd and last Parapan American Games that was not tied to the Pan American Games.

| Preceded by Winnipeg | XIV Pan American Games; Santo Domingo (2003) | Succeeded by Rio de Janeiro |
