= Mexico at the 2003 Pan American Games =

- IOC code: MEX
- NOC: Comité Olímpico Mexicano (in Spanish)

in Santo Domingo 1–17 August 2003
- Flag bearer: Ana Guevara
- Medals Ranked 5th: Gold 20 Silver 27 Bronze 32 Total 79

Pan American Games appearances (overview)
- 1951; 1955; 1959; 1963; 1967; 1971; 1975; 1979; 1983; 1987; 1991; 1995; 1999; 2003; 2007; 2011; 2015; 2019; 2023; 2027

Mexico participated at the 14th Pan American Games, held in Santo Domingo, the Dominican Republic, from 1 to 17 August 2003.

== Medals ==
=== Gold ===
===== Athletics =====
- Men's 10,000 metres: Teodoro Vega
- Men's 50 km walk: Germán Sánchez
- Women's 400 metres: Ana Guevara
- Women's 5000 metres: Adriana Fernández
- Women's 10,000 metres: Adriana Fernández
- Women's 20 km walk: Victoria Palacios

===== Bowling =====
- Men's singles: Daniel Falconi
- Women's doubles: Iliana Lomeli and Adriana Pérez

===== Boxing =====
- Men's light heavyweight (81 kg): Ramiro Reducindo

===== Diving =====
- Men's 10 m platform: Rommel Pacheco

===== Taekwondo =====
- Men's +80 kg: Víctor Estrada
- Women's 57 kg: Iridia Salazar

=== Silver ===
===== Athletics =====
- Men's 5000 metres: José David Galván
- Men's 20 km walk: Bernardo Segura
- Women's 5000 metres: Nora Rocha
- Women's 20 km walk: Rosario Sánchez
- Women's high jump: Romary Rifka

===== Beach volleyball =====
- Women's tournament: Mayra García and Hilda Gaxiola

===== Bowling =====
- Men's singles: Marcos Baeza

===== Boxing =====
- Men's bantamweight (54 kg): Abner Mares

===== Canoeing =====
- Men's C-1 1000 m: José Romero
- Men's C-2 500 m: Cristian Dehesa and José Romero

===== Diving =====
- Men's 3 m springboard: Fernando Platas
- Men's 10 m synchronized platform: Fernando Platas and Rommel Pacheco
- Women's 3 m springboard synchronized: Laura Sánchez and Paola Espinosa
- Women's 10 m synchronized platform: Laura Sánchez and Paola Espinosa

===== Equestrian =====
- Jumping team: Antonio Chedraui, Federico Fernández, Santiago Lambre and Gerardo Tazzer
- Dressage individual: Bernadette Pujals

===== Sailing =====
- Mixed Hobie 16: Armando Noriega and Pamela Noriega

===== Taekwondo =====
- Men's 58 kg: Oscar Francisco Salazar
- Men's 80 kg: José Luis Ramírez

===== Weightlifting =====
- Women's 58 kg: Soraya Jiménez

=== Bronze ===
===== Athletics =====
- Men's 20 km walk: Alejandro López

===== Baseball =====
- Men's tournament: Mexico

===== Boxing =====
- Men's light flyweight (48 kg): Raúl Castañeda
- Men's flyweight (51 kg): Raúl Hirales
- Men's lightweight (60 kg): Francisco Javier Vargas
- Men's light welterweight (64 kg): Juan de Dios Navarro
- Men's welterweight (69 kg): Alfredo Angulo

===== Canoeing =====
- Men's K-2 500 m: Manuel Cortina Martínez and Ricardo Reza
- Men's C-1 500 m: Francisco Caputitla
- Men's C-2 1000 m: Cristian Dehesa and José Romero

===== Equestrian =====
- Dressage team: Omar Zayrik, Bernadette Pujals, Antonio Rivera and Joaquín Orth

===== Football =====
- Men's tournament: Mexico
- Women's tournament: Mexico

===== Karate =====
- Men's Kumite (74 kg): Tetsuo Alonso Murayama
- Women's Kumite (+58 kg): Marta Embriz

===== Taekwondo =====
- Men's 68 kg: Erick Osorio
- Women's 49 kg: Carmen Morales
- Women's 67 kg: Marien Ramírez

===== Weightlifting =====
- Women's 63 kg: Luz Acosta

== Results by event ==
=== Athletics ===
Track

Athlete	Event	Heat		Final	
Athlete	Event	Time	Rank	Time	Rank
Dulce María Rodríguez	Women's 1500 m	—	—	4:11.46	5
Adriana Fernández	Women's 5000 m	—	—	15:30.65	1st place, gold medalist(s)
Nora Rocha	Women's 5000 m	—	—	15:40.98	2nd place, silver medalist(s)
Teodoro Vega	Men's 10000 m	—	—	28:49.38	1st place, gold medalist(s)
Pablo Olmedo	Men's 10000 m	—	—	29:41.31	4
Adriana Fernández	Women's 10000 m	—	—	33:16.05	1st place, gold medalist(s)
Madaí Pérez	Women's 10000 m	—	—	34:27.71	5
Oscar Juanz	Men's 400 m hurdles	50.31	7	50.28	4
José Salvador Miranda	Men's 3000 m steeplechase	—	—	8:47.84	5

Road

Athlete	Event	Time	Rank
Francisco Bautista	Men's marathon	2:25:50	5
Benjamín Paredes	Men's marathon	DNF	—
Angélica Sánchez	Women's marathon	2:53:56	7
Isabel Juárez	Women's marathon	DNF	—
Bernardo Segura	Men's 20 km race walk	1:23:31	2nd place, silver medalist(s)
Alejandro López	Men's 20 km race walk	1:24:33	3rd place, bronze medalist(s)
Victoria Palacios	Women's 20 km race walk	1:35:16	1st place, gold medalist(s)
Rosario Sánchez	Women's 20 km race walk	1:35:21	2nd place, silver medalist(s)
Germán Sánchez	Men's 50 km race walk	4:05:02	1st place, gold medalist(s)
Omar Zepeda	Men's 50 km race walk	DSQ	—

Field

Athlete	Event	Throws						Total	
Athlete	Event	1	2	3	4	5	6	Distance	Rank
Violeta Guzmán	Women's hammer throw	57.99	58.31	X	56.99	X	57.44	58.31 m	7
Francisco Guzmán	Men's shot put	X	17.03	17.39	—	—	—	17.39 m	9

=== Basketball ===
==== Men's tournament ====
- Anthony Norwood
- Adam Parada
- David Meza
- Horacio Llamas
- Omar López
- Ramsés Benítez
- Víctor Mariscal
- Omar Quintero
- Víctor Ávila
- Enrique Zúñiga
- Jorge Rochín
- David Crouse

Head coach:

- Guillermo Vecchio

=== Boxing ===
Athlete	Event	Round of 16	Quarterfinals	Semifinals	Final
Athlete	Event	Opposition Result	Opposition Result	Opposition Result	Opposition Result
Raúl Castañeda	Light flyweight	Reveco (ARG); W RSCO–3	Montero (DOM); W 31–11	Tamara (COL); L 4–40 → (bronze)	Did not advance
Raúl Hilares	Flyweight	Pérez (VEN); W 16–12	Acosta (ARG); W 23–15	Gamboa (CUB); L 18–31 → (bronze)	Did not advance
Abner Mares	Bantamweight	Flores (ARG); W 20–10	López (PUR); W 24–21	Perez (COL); W 26–19	Rigondeaux (CUB); L 17–7 → (silver)
Alfredo Angulo	Welterweight	Bye	Coffi (VEN); W 11–10	McPherson (USA); L AB–4 → (bronze)	Did not advance
Marco Periban	Middleweight	Islas (ARG); L 12–14	did not advance		
Ramiro Reducindo	Light heavyweight	Bye	Rene (USA); W 12–5	Muñoz (VEN); W 15–8	Hernández (CUB); W 37–20 → (gold)

=== Swimming ===
==== Men's competitions ====
Athlete	Event	Heat		Final	
Athlete	Event	Time	Rank	Time	Rank
Alejandro Siqueiros	50 m freestyle	24.17	21	Did not advance	
Alejandro Siqueiros	100 m freestyle	51.66	13	51.88	13
Javier Díaz	100 m freestyle	52.51	22	Did not advance	
Alejandro Siqueiros	200 m freestyle	1:53.81	10	1:54.27	12
Javier Díaz	200 m freestyle	1:55.34	11	1:54.96	13
Leonardo Salinas	400 m freestyle	3:59.38	7	4:03.10	8
Andres Jiménez	400 m freestyle	4:03.92	10	DNS	—
Andres Jiménez	1500 m freestyle	—	—	15:52.40	5
Leonardo Salinas	1500 m freestyle	—	—	16:00.99	7
Juan Rodela	100 m backstroke	58.12	11	58.35	11
Diego Urreta	200 m backstroke	2:05.36	6	2:05.08	7
Juan Rodela	200 m backstroke	2:05.91	8	2:06.39	8
Alfredo Jacobo	200 m breaststroke	2:20.82	8	2:21.13	8
Joshua Ilika Brenner	100 m butterfly	54.34	6	53.46	4
Joshua Ilika Brenner	200 m butterfly	2:03.04	8	DNS	—
Diego Urreta	200 m individual medley	2:06.21	8	2:06.32	8

==== Women's competitions ====
Athlete	Event	Heat		Final	
Athlete	Event	Time	Rank	Time	Rank
Alejandra Galan	200 m freestyle	2:05.77	9	2:05.32	9
Atenas López	200 m freestyle	2:07.13	11	2:06.62	10
Tania Galindo	400 m freestyle	4:28.32	11	4:26.79	11
Tania Galindo	800 m freestyle	—		9:13.51	9

=== Triathlon ===
Athlete	Event	Race			Total	
Athlete	Event	Swim	Bike	Run	Time	Rank
José Zepeda	Men's individual	20:03.800	57:28.700	36:14.200	01:54:17	7
Eligio Cervantes	Men's individual	20:58.000	58:34.500	34:30.700	01:55:00	10
Javier Rosas	Men's individual	20:05.900	59:33.300	35:35.100	01:56:04	11
Esther Aguayo	Women's individual	19:54.300	1:03:59.400	42:17.100	02:06:10	11
Maria Barrera	Women's individual	21:53.700	1:09:34.000	43:34.800	02:15:02	15

== See also ==
- Mexico at the 2002 Central American and Caribbean Games
- Mexico at the 2004 Summer Olympics
