= Colombia at the 2003 Pan American Games =

- IOC code: COL
- NOC: Colombian Olympic Committee
- Website: www.olimpicocol.co (in Spanish)

in Santo Domingo 1–17 August 2003
- Flag bearer: Danilo Caro
- Medals Ranked 8th: Gold 11 Silver 8 Bronze 23 Total 42

Pan American Games appearances (overview)
- 1951; 1955; 1959; 1963; 1967; 1971; 1975; 1979; 1983; 1987; 1991; 1995; 1999; 2003; 2007; 2011; 2015; 2019; 2023; 2027

The 14th Pan American Games were held in Santo Domingo, Dominican Republic, from August 1 to August 17, 2003.

== Medals ==
=== Gold ===
===== Boxing =====
- Men's featherweight (–57 kg): Likar Ramos Concha

===== Cycling =====
- Men's road time trial: José Serpa
- Women's individual pursuit: María Luisa Calle

===== Weightlifting =====
- Men's – 56 kg: Nelson Castro
- Men's – 62 kg: Diego Fernando Salazar
- Men's – 85 kg: Héctor Ballesteros
- Women's – 53 kg: Mabel Mosquera
- Women's – 63 kg: Ubaldina Valoyes
- Women's – 69 kg: Tulia Angela Medina
- Women's + 75 kg: Carmenza Delgado

=== Silver ===
===== Boxing =====
- Men's light flyweight (–51 kg): Carlos José Tamara

===== Cycling =====
- Men's sprint: Leonardo Narváez
- Men's team sprint: Leonardo Narváez, Rodrigo Barros, and Jonathan Marín
- Men's madison: Alexander González, and Leonardo Duque

===== Weightlifting =====
- Men's – 77 kg: Ferney Manzano

=== Bronze ===
===== Athletics =====
- Men's marathon: Diego Colorado
- Women's 10,000 metres: Bertha Sánchez

===== Bowling =====
- Men's doubles: Andrés Gómez and David Romero
- Women's singles: Clara Guerrero
- Women's doubles: Sara Vargas and Clara Guerrero

===== Boxing =====
- Men's bantamweight (–54 kg): Johny Perez
- Men's middleweight (–75 kg): Alexander Brand

===== Cycling =====
- Men's track pursuit: Alexander González
- Men's team pursuit: Alexander González, José Serpa, Arles Castro, and Juan Pablo Forero
- Men's points race: Leonardo Duque

===== Weightlifting =====
- Men's – 85 kg: José Oliver Ruíz
- Men's – 94 kg: Jairo Cossio
- Men's – 105 kg: William Solís

== Results by event ==
=== Athletics ===
Track

Athlete	Event	Heat		Final	
Athlete	Event	Time	Rank	Time	Rank
Bertha Sánchez	Women's 5000 m	—	—	16:13.59	5
William Naranjo	Men's 10000 m	—	—	30:13.26	6
Bertha Sánchez	Women's 10000 m	—	—	33:56.17	3rd place, bronze medalist(s)
Princesa Oliveros	Women's 400 m hurdles	57.44	9	—	9

Road

Athlete	Event	Time	Rank
Diego Colorado	Men's marathon	2:21:48	3rd place, bronze medalist(s)
Hugo Jiménez	Men's marathon	2:35:26	9
Iglandini González	Women's marathon	2:47:40	4
Luis Fernando López	Men's 20 km walk	1:27:32	4
Fredy Hernández	Men's 20 km walk	1:28:07	5
Sandra Zapata	Women's 20 km walk	1:38:49	6

Field

Athlete	Event	Throws						Total	
Athlete	Event	1	2	3	4	5	6	Distance	Rank
Noraldo Palacios	Men's javelin throw	68.31	64.02	69.09	—	—	—	69.09 m	9
Sabina Moya	Women's javelin throw	56.77	X	54.20	52.86	51.69	60.17	60.17 m	4
Zuleima Araméndiz	Women's javelin throw	X	X	48.89	48.81	X	50.37	50.37 m	7
Luz Dary Castro	Women's discus throw	52.51	X	51.02	X	X	55.65	55.65 m	6
Jhonny Rodríguez	Men's shot put	17.75	17.73	X	X	18.16	X	18.16 m	7
Luz Dary Castro	Women's shot put	X	14.92	14.67	—	—	—	14.92 m	9

=== Boxing ===
Athlete	Event	Round of 16	Quarterfinals	Semifinals	Final
Athlete	Event	Opposition Result	Opposition Result	Opposition Result	Opposition Result
Carlos José Tamara	Light flyweight	Baca (NCA); W RSCO-2	Serrano (PUR); W 16-9	Castañeda (MEX); W 20-4	Bartelemí (CUB); L 6-15 → (silver)
José David Mosquera	Lightweight	Ferreyra (ARG); L 19-20	did not advance		
Johny Pérez	Bantamweight	Guevara (NCA); W 19-9	Santos (BRA); W 27-26	Mares (MEX); L 19-26 → (bronze)	did not advance
Likar Ramos Concha	Featherweight	Oliveira (BRA); W 12-10	Alfaro (NCA); W RSC-1	Gaudet (CAN); W 13-11	Garcia (USA); W 33-12 → (gold)
José Mosquera	Lightweight	Ferreyra (ARG); L 19-20	did not advance		
Breidis Prescott	Light welterweight	Matthysse (ARG); W 17-5	Dios Navarro (MEX); L 14-+14	did not advance	
Alexander Brand	Middleweight	Bye	Almonte (PUR); W RSC-4	Despaigne (CUB); L 3-18 → (bronze)	did not advance
Tomas Orozco	Heavyweight	Manswell (TRI); L 3-15	did not advance		
Celso Pinzón	Super heavyweight	Ceballos (ARG); L 2-13	did not advance		

=== Cycling ===
==== Road ====
- José Serpa
  - Men's road time trial — 1:04.45 (→ 1st place)
- Hernán Bonilla
  - Men's road time trial — + 2.39 (→ 8th place)
- Paola Madriñan
  - Women's road time trial — + 2.01 (→ 4th place)
- Sandra Gómez
  - Women's road time trial — + 3.21 (→ 10th place)

==== Mountain bike ====
- Fabio Castañeda
  - Men's cross country — + 1 lap (→ 5th place)
- Héctor Paez
  - Men's cross country — did not finish (→ no ranking)
- Flor Delgadillo
  - Women's cross country — + 1 lap (→ 7th place)

=== Swimming ===
==== Men's competition ====
Athlete	Event	Heat		Final	
Athlete	Event	Time	Rank	Time	Rank
Camilo Becerra	50 m freestyle	22.97	8	23.16	8
Camilo Becerra	100 m freestyle	52.12	17	DNS	20

=== Triathlon ===
Athlete	Event	Race			Total	
Athlete	Event	Swim	Bike	Run	Time	Rank
Ricardo Cardeño	Men's individual	—	—	—	DNS	—
Fiorella d'Croz	Women's individual	21:34.600	1:07:24.000	47:51.800	02:16:50	16
Maria Morales	Women's individual	—	—	—	DNS	—

== See also ==
- Colombia at the 2004 Summer Olympics
