= Cuba at the 2003 Pan American Games =

- IOC code: CUB
- NOC: Cuban Olympic Committee

in Santo Domingo 1–17 August 2003
- Flag bearer: Osleydis Melendez
- Medals Ranked 2nd: Gold 72 Silver 41 Bronze 39 Total 152

Pan American Games appearances (overview)
- 1951; 1955; 1959; 1963; 1967; 1971; 1975; 1979; 1983; 1987; 1991; 1995; 1999; 2003; 2007; 2011; 2015; 2019; 2023; 2027

The 14th Pan American Games were held in Santo Domingo, Dominican Republic, from 1 to 17 August 2003.

== Medals ==
=== Gold ===
===== Athletics =====
- Men's 110 m hurdles: Yuniel Hernández
- Men's long jump: Iván Pedroso
- Men's triple jump: Yoandri Betanzos
- Men's javelin: Emeterio González
- Women's 200 metres: Roxana Díaz
- Women's 800 metres: Adriana Muñoz
- Women's 1,500 metres: Adriana Muñoz
- Women's triple jump: Mabel Gay
- Women's shot put: Yumileidi Cumbá
- Women's hammer throw: Yipsi Moreno

===== Beach volleyball =====
- Men's tournament: Francisco Álvarez and Juan Rossell
- Women's tournament: Dalixia Fernández and Tamara Larrea

===== Baseball =====
- Men's tournament: Cuba

===== Basketball =====
- Women's tournament: Yudith Águila, Suchitel Ávila, Yayma Boulet, Ariadna Capiró, Liset Castillo, Milaisis Duanys, Oyanaisis Gelis, Yamilé Martínez, Yaquelín Plutín, Yulianne Rodríguez, Taimara Suero and Lisdeivis Víctores.

===== Boxing =====
- Men's light flyweight (– 48 kg): Yan Bartelemí
- Men's flyweight (– 51 kg): Yuriorkis Gamboa
- Men's bantamweight (– 54 kg): Guillermo Rigondeaux
- Men's lightweight (– 60 kg): Mario Kindelán
- Men's welterweight (– 69 kg): Lorenzo Aragón
- Men's heavyweight (– 91 kg): Odlanier Solís

===== Canoeing =====
- Men's K2 1,000 m: Lancy Martínez and Yoel Mendoza
- Men's K4 1,000 m: Oslay Calzadilla, Andi Sicilia, Lancy Martínez and Yoel Mendoza
- Men's C1 500 m: Karel Aguilar
- Men's C2 500 m: Ledis Balceiro and Ibrahim Rojas
- Men's C2 1,000 m: Ledis Balceiro and Ibrahim Rojas

===== Cycling =====
- Men's team sprint: Ahmed López, Reinier Cartaya and Yosmani Poll
- Men's time trial: Ahmed López
- Women's individual road race: Yoanka González

===== Fencing =====
- Men's épée individual: Camilo Boris
- Men's épée team: Camilo Boris, Andrés Carrillo and Nelson Loyola
- Women's épée individual: Eimey Gómez
- Women's épée team: Eimey Gómez, Zuleydis Ortiz and Misleidis Oña

===== Gymnastics =====
- Men's all-around: Erick López
- Men's parallel bars: Erick López
- Men's pommel horse: Erick López
- Men's rings: Erick López
- Men's vault: Erick López
- Men's team: Cuba
- Women's vault: Leyanet González

===== Shooting =====
- Men's 25 m rapid fire pistol: Leuris Pupo
- Women's 50 m rifle 3 positions: Eglis Yaima Cruz
- Women's 10 m air rifle: Eglis Yaima Cruz

===== Taekwondo =====
- Women's – 49 kg: Yanelis Yuliet Ladrada

===== Weightlifting =====
- Men's – 69 kg: Yordanis Borrero

=== Silver ===
===== Athletics =====
- Men's 400 metres: Yeimer López
- Men's long jump: Luis Felipe Méliz
- Men's discus throw: Frank Casañas
- Men's javelin: Isbel Luaces
- Women's 10,000 metres: Yudelkis Martínez
- Women's marathon: Mariela González
- Women's 400 m hurdles: Daimí Pernía
- Women's 4 × 100 metres: Dainelky Pérez, Roxana Díaz, Virgen Benavides and Misleidys Lazo
- Women's discus throw: Anaelys Fernández
- Women's hammer throw: Yunaika Crawford

===== Boxing =====
- Men's middleweight (– 75 kg): Yordanis Despaigne
- Men's light heavyweight (– 81 kg): Yoan Pablo Hernández
- Men's super heavyweight (+ 91 kg): Michel López Núñez

===== Cycling =====
- Men's individual road race: Pedro Pablo Pérez
- Women's individual pursuit: Yoanka González

===== Fencing =====
- Men's foil team: Nelson Loyola, Raúl Perojo, Reinier Suárez and Abraham O'Reilly

===== Gymnastics =====
- Men's parallel bars: Abel Driggs
- Men's horizontal bar: Michael Brito

===== Gymnastics =====
- Women's group ribbon: Cuba
- Women's group hoop-ball: Cuba

===== Shooting =====
- Men's 50 m pistol: Arseny Borrero
- Men's 25 m rapid fire pistol: Juan Francisco Pérez
- Men's 50 m rifle prone: Reiner Estipinan
- Men's skeet: Guillermo Alfredo Torres
- Women's 25 m pistol: Margarita Tarradel

===== Taekwondo =====
- Men's – 68 kg: Yosvani Pérez

===== Volleyball =====
- Women's tournament: Yumilka Ruiz, Indira Mestre, Yanelis Santos, Nancy Carrillo, Martha Sánchez, Zoila Barros, Anniara Muñoz, Liana Mesa, Marbelis Martínez, Yaima Ortíz, Katia Guevara, Azurrima Álvarez

===== Weightlifting =====
- Men's – 62 kg: Vladimir Rodríguez
- Men's – 85 kg: Yoandry Hernández
- Men's – 105 kg: Michel Batista

=== Bronze ===
===== Athletics =====
- Men's 4 × 100 metres: José Ángel César, José Carlos Peña, Luis Alexander Reyes and Juan Pita
- Men's triple jump: Yoelbi Quesada
- Men's discus throw: Loy Martínez
- Men's hammer throw: Yosvany Suárez
- Men's decathlon: Yonelvis Águila
- Women's high jump: Yarianny Argüelles
- Women's long jump: Yargelis Savigne
- Women's triple jump: Yusmay Bicet
- Women's discus throw: Yania Ferrales
- Women's javelin: Osleidys Menéndez
- Women's heptathlon: Magalys García

===== Boxing =====
- Men's featherweight (– 57 kg): Yosvani Aguilera

===== Cycling =====
- Women's individual road race: Yeilin Fernández
- Women's keirin: Yumari González
- Women's points race: Yoanka González

===== Fencing =====
- Men's foil individual: Raúl Perojo
- Men's foil individual: Reinier Suárez
- Men's sabre team: Abel Caballero, Yunior Naranjo, Cándido Maya and Abraham O'Reilly
- Women's foil individual: Arianne Ribot
- Women's sabre individual: Ana Faez

===== Gymnastics =====
- Men's rings: Abel Driggs

===== Karate =====
- Men's kumite (– 62 kg): Yusei Padron
- Men's kumite (– 68 kg): Yordanis Torres

===== Shooting =====
- Men's 50 m pistol: Norbelis Bárzaga

===== Weightlifting =====
- Men's – 69 kg: Aristoteles Fuentes

== Results by event ==
=== Athletics ===
Track

Athlete	Event	Heat		Final	
Athlete	Event	Time	Rank	Time	Rank
Juan Pita	Men's 100 m	10.56	9	—	9
Luis Alexander Reyes	Men's 100 m	10.61	10	—	10
Adriana Muñoz	Women's 1,500 m	—	—	4:09.57	1st place, gold medalist(s)
Jany Tamargo	Women's 1,500 m	—	—	4:20.33	6
Yudelkis Martínez	Women's 5,000 m	—	—	16:09.33	4
Yudelkis Martínez	Women's 10,000 m	—	—	33:55.12	2nd place, silver medalist(s)
Sergio Hierrezuelo	Men's 400 m hurdles	50.37	8	50.34	6
Daimí Pernía	Women's 400 m hurdles	55.77	3	55.10	2nd place, silver medalist(s)
Yudalis Díaz	Women's 400 m hurdles	57.92	10	—	10

Road

Athlete	Event	Time	Rank
Aguelmis Rojas	Men's marathon	2:23:18	4
Mariela González	Women's marathon	2:42:55	2nd place, silver medalist(s)
Emperatriz Wilson	Women's marathon	2:54:16	8
Jorge Luis Pino	Men's 50 km race walk	DNF	—

Field

Athlete	Event	Throws						Total	
Athlete	Event	1	2	3	4	5	6	Distance	Rank
Emeterio González	Men's javelin	80.27	X	78.89	X	79.43	81.72	81.72 m	1st place, gold medalist(s)
Isbel Luaces	Men's javelin	79.11	77.22	77.71	80.95	X	79.88	80.95 m	2nd place, silver medalist(s)
Osleidys Menéndez	Women's javelin	60.20	58.06	X	58.79	X	57.98	60.20 m	3rd place, bronze medalist(s)
Sonia Bisset	Women's javelin	56.78	54.81	X	X	54.31	58.00	58.00 m	5
Yosvany Suárez	Men's hammer	68.54	70.07	X	X	X	70.24	70.24 m	3rd place, bronze medalist(s)
Alberto Sánchez	Men's hammer	X	68.66	X	69.37	X	X	69.37 m	4
Yipsi Moreno	Women's hammer	X	73.75	73.05	74.25	73.89	X	74.25 m	1st place, gold medalist(s)
Yunaika Crawford	Women's hammer	63.57	X	X	65.07	69.57	67.99	69.57 m	2nd place, silver medalist(s)
Frank Casañas	Men's discus	60.21	60.04	61.32	62.52	62.61	X	62.61 m	2nd place, silver medalist(s)
Lois Maikel Martínez	Men's discus	60.78	60.12	X	60.33	61.36	60.10	61.36 m	3rd place, bronze medalist(s)
Anaelys Fernández	Women's discus	X	57.89	55.68	61.26	61.25	60.19	61.26 m	2nd place, silver medalist(s)
Yania Ferrales	Women's discus	53.59	55.22	57.20	60.03	58.44	55.15	60.03 m	3rd place, bronze medalist(s)
Alexis Paumier	Men's shot put	17.96	—	X	19.32	X	X	19.32 m	5
Yumileidi Cumbá	Women's shot put	18.30	19.14	18.98	X	18.96	19.31	19.31 m	1st place, gold medalist(s)
Misleydis González	Women's shot put	17.90	X	17.99	X	17.75	17.52	17.99 m	4

Decathlon

Athlete	Decathlon										Total	
Athlete	1	2	3	4	5	6	7	8	9	10	Points	Rank
Yonelvis Águila	11.16	7.06	13.77	2.01	50.24	14.89	47.04	3.70	63.01	4:49.93	7593	3rd place, bronze medalist(s)

Heptathlon

Athlete	Heptathlon							Total	
Athlete	1	2	3	4	5	6	7	Points	Rank
Magalys García	13.61	1.71	13.69	24.44	5.61	45.79	2:26.26	5864	3rd place, bronze medalist(s)
Yuleidis Limonta	13.95	1.74	12.11	24.98	5.99	31.33	2:29.23	5496	5

- Yarianni Argüelles
- Virgen Benavides
- Yoandris Betanzos
- Yusmay Bicet
- Zulia Inés Calatayud
- José Ángel César
- Roxana Tomasa Díaz
- Alianny Echevarría
- Anier García
- Glauder Garzón
- Mabel Gay
- Libania Grenot
- Yuniel Hernández
- Sergio Hierrezuelo
- Yanelis Lara
- Misleidys Lazo
- Luis Felipe Méliz
- Yahumara Neyra
- Iván Pedroso
- José Carlos Peña
- Katiuska Pérez
- Lisvany Arlys Pérez
- Dainelky Pérez
- Juan Pita
- Yoelbi Quesada
- Luis Alexander Reyes
- Aguelmis Rojas
- Yargelis Savigne
- Anay Tejeda

=== Baseball ===
==== Men's tournament ====
- Ariel Pestano
- Roger Machado
- Alexander Ramos
- Manuel Benavides
- Eduardo Paret
- Joan Carlos Pedroso
- Michel Enríquez
- Yulieski Gourriel
- Carlos Tabares
- Osmani Urrutia
- Frederich Cepeda
- Roberquis Videux
- Javier Méndez
- Adiel Palma
- Vladimir Hernández
- Norge Luis Vera
- Orelvis Ávila
- Vicyohandri Odelín
- Yadel Martí
- Yosvani Aragón

=== Basketball ===
==== Women's tournament ====
- Preliminary round
  - Defeated United States (84-62)
  - Defeated Dominican Republic (82-55)
  - Defeated Argentina (83-57)
  - Defeated Canada (81-66)
  - Lost to Brazil (70-79)
- Semifinal
  - Defeated Canada (58-49)
- Final
  - Defeated United States (75-64) → Gold medal
- Team roster
  - Yudith Águila
  - Suchitel Ávila
  - Yaima Boulet
  - Ariadna Capiró
  - Liset Castillo
  - Milaisis Duanys
  - Oyanaisis Gelis
  - Yamilé Martínez
  - Yaquelín Plutín
  - Yulianne Rodríguez
  - Taimara Suero
  - Lisdeivis Víctores

=== Boxing ===
Athlete	Event	Round of 16	Quarterfinals	Semifinals	Final
Athlete	Event	Opposition Result	Opposition Result	Opposition Result	Opposition Result
Yan Bartelemí	Light flyweight	Bye	Whitfield (USA); W 16-8	Perez (VEN); W 12-2	Tamara (COL); W 15-6 → (gold)
Yuriorkis Gamboa	Flyweight	Valcárcel (PUR); W 26-13	Torres (ECU); W RSCO-2	Hilares (MEX); W 31-18	Payano (DOM); W 17-7 → (gold)
Guillermo Rigondeaux	Bantamweight	Mendez (DOM); W 17-2	Espinoza (VEN); W RSCH-3	Kooner (CAN); W 22-2	Mares (MEX); W 17-7 → (gold)
Yosvani Aguilera	Featherweight	Bye	Brizuela (ARG); W 22-8	Garcia (USA); L 14-16 → (bronze)	did not advance
Mario Kindelán	Lightweight	Matos (BRA); W 7-3	González (NCA); W RSCH-4	Díaz (DOM); W 16-12	De Jesús (PUR); W 22-2 → (gold)
Diógenes Luña	Light welterweight	Bye	Costa (BRA); L 17-28	did not advance	
Lorenzo Aragón	Welterweight	Bye	Velardes (ARG); W 23-4	González (DOM); W 25-4	McPherson (USA); W 30-11 → (gold)
Yordanis Despaigne	Middleweight	Dirrell (USA); W 21-20	Islas (ARG); W RSCI-2	Brand (COL); W 18-3	Ubaldo (DOM); L 12-23 → (silver)
Yoan Pablo Hernández	Light heavyweight	Bye	Beltrán (ECU); W RSC-1	Casimiro (DOM); W RSC-4	Reducindo (MEX); L 20-37 → (silver)
Odlanier Solís	Heavyweight	Bye	Bisbal (PUR); W RSCH-2	Douglas (CAN); W 16-2	Manswell (TRI); W 15-3 → (gold)
Michel López Núñez	Super heavyweight	Bye	Espinoza (ECU); W RSC-2	Bisbal (PUR); W 17-13	Estrada (USA); L 6-14 → (silver)

=== Canoeing ===
- Karel Aguilar
- Arasai Andino
- Ledis Frank Balceiro
- Oslay Calzadilla
- Anaysis Carrillo
- Yaumara Chaves
- Lanci Martínez
- Yoel Mendoza
- Yulitza Meneces
- Yaneisi Meriño
- Eliecer Ordoñes
- Aldo Pruna
- Ibrahim Rojas
- Andi Sicilia

=== Cycling ===
- Yudelmis Domínguez
- Yeilien Fernández
- Yoanka González
- Yumari González
- Yosvany Jesús Gutiérrez
- Julio César Herrera
- Ahmed López
- Joel Mariño
- Damián Martínez
- Michel Pedroso
- Pedro Pablo Pérez
- Yosmani Pol
- Luis Romero

=== Diving ===
- Jesús Iory Aballí
- Jorge Betancourt
- Iohana Cruz
- Erick Fornaris
- Yolanda Ortiz

=== Fencing ===
- Camilo Boris
- Abel Caballero
- Andrés Carrillo
- Ana Faez
- Eimey Gómez
- Maylin González
- Odalys Gorguet
- Nelson Loyola
- Cándido Maya
- Yunior Naranjo
- Misleydis Oña
- Abraham Orrelly
- Zuleydis Ortiz
- Raúl Perojo
- Arianne Ribot
- Reinier Suárez

=== Field hockey ===
==== Men's tournament ====
- Alexander Abréu
- Alain Bardají
- Juan Carlos Benavides
- Yoandy Blanco
- Yoel Gómez
- José Gómez Pelaez
- Iosvany Hernández
- Rolando Larrinaga
- Yuani Larrondo
- Roberto Carlos Lemus
- Yumay Oliva
- Yuri Pérez
- Yuniel Rodríguez
- Yanker Rojas
- Edel Beny Sayas
- Yuniel Villanueva

=== Football ===
==== Men's tournament ====
- Reinier Alcántara
- Julio Aldama
- Lázaro Alfonso
- Lázaro Arocha
- Yusvany Caballero
- Alain Cervantes
- Yunier Escalona
- Luis Maykel Estrada
- Pedro Faife
- Reysander Fernández
- Maikel Galindo
- Carlos Madrigal
- Eduardo Morales
- Jensy Muñoz
- Yulier Olivera
- Lázaro Reyes
- Nayuri Rivero
- Sandro Sevillano

=== Gymnastics ===
==== Artistic ====
- Michael Brito
- Janerki de la Peña
- Abel Drigg
- Daylet Girot
- Leyanet González
- Mónica La Rosa
- Lázaro Lamelas
- Charles León
- Erick López
- Yurlanis Mendoza
- Yaidelín Rojas
- Yareimis Vázquez

==== Rhythmic ====
- Arletis Chacón
- Yanet Comas
- Diana Díaz
- Yenly Figueredo
- Licelia Mederos
- Kirenia Ruiz
- Mirlay Sánchez

=== Judo ===
- Yordanis Arencibia
- Gabriel Arteaga
- Daima Beltrán
- Danieska Carrión
- Oreidis Despaigne
- Yosvany Despaigne
- Angelo Gómez
- Driulys González
- Yurisel Laborde
- Regla Leyén
- Yurieleidys Lupetey
- Rubert Martínez
- Amarilis Savón
- Rigoberto Trujillo

=== Karate ===
- Yaneya Gutiérrez
- Yordanis Torres
- Jorge Zaragoza
- Yusei Padrón

=== Swimming ===
==== Men ====
Athlete	Event	Heat		Final	
Athlete	Event	Time	Rank	Time	Rank
Marcos Hernández	50 m freestyle	22.90	7	22.64	5
Antonio Hernández	50 m freestyle	23.78	18	did not advance	
Antonio Hernández	100 m freestyle	51.68	14	51.75	12
Marcos Hernández	100 m freestyle	51.95	16	DNS	19
Antonio Hernández	200 m freestyle	1:57.77	20	did not advance	

==== Women ====
Athlete	Event	Heat		Final	
Athlete	Event	Time	Rank	Time	Rank
Imaday Núñez	200 m breaststroke	2:36.80	7	2:34.10	6

- Gunther Rodríguez
- Yojan Fidel García
- Neisser Bent
- Marcos Hernández
- Juan Vargas

=== Triathlon ===
Athlete	Event	Race			Total	
Athlete	Event	Swim	Bike	Run	Time	Rank
Yaccery Leal	Men's individual	20:59.100	58:39.000	37:59.600	01:58:33	17
Yaricel Romero	Women's individual	22:00.400	1:06:57.900	41:50.300	02:10:48	12
Niurka Guirola	Women's individual	22:00.000	1:07:01.500	43:43.900	02:12:45	13

=== Weightlifting ===
- Osley Pedroso
- Aristóteles Fuentes
- Yordani Borrero
- Ernesto Quiroga
- Joel Mackenzie
- Michel Batista
- Yoandris Hernández
- Bladimir Rodríguez

=== Wrestling ===
- Luis Méndez
- Mijail Lopez
- Yoel Romero
- Lázaro Rivas
- Roberto Monzón
- Serguei Rondón
- Wilfredo Morales
- Alexis Rodríguez
- Ernesto Peña
- Filiberto Azcuy
- Yandro Quintana
- René Montero
- Juan Luis Marén
- Daniel González

== See also ==
- Cuba at the 2004 Summer Olympics
