= Weightlifting at the 2007 Pan American Games – Men's 85 kg =

Weightlifting – Men's 85 kg at the 2007 Pan American Games
- Venue: Complexo Esportivo Riocentro
- Dates: 16 July 2007
- Competitors: 8 from 8 nations
- Winning total weight: 363 kg

Medalists
Gold medal	José Oliver Ruiz	Colombia
Silver medal	Jadier Valladares	Cuba
Bronze medal	Herbys Márquez	Venezuela

The Men's 85 kg weightlifting event at the 2007 Pan American Games took place at the Complexo Esportivo Riocentro on 16 July 2007.

== Schedule ==
All times are Brasilia Time (UTC-3)

Date	Time	Event
16 July 2007	18:00	Group A

== Records ==
Prior to this competition, the existing world, Pan American and Games records were as follows:

World record	Snatch	Andrei Rybakou (BLR)	186 kg	Władysławowo, Poland	6 May 2006
World record	Clean & Jerk	Zhang Yong (CHN)	218 kg	Ramat Gan, Israel	25 April 1998
World record	Total	World Standard	395 kg	–	1 January 1998
Pan American record	Snatch				
Pan American record	Clean & Jerk	Ernesto Quiroga (CUB)	210 kg	Sydney, Australia	23 September 2000
Pan American record	Total	Ernesto Quiroga (CUB)	375 kg	Sydney, Australia	23 September 2000
Games record	Snatch	Álvaro Velasco (COL)	162 kg	Winnipeg, Canada	6 August 1999
Games record	Clean & Jerk	Héctor Ballesteros (COL)	202 kg	Santo Domingo, Dominican Republic	14 August 2003
Games record	Total	Yoandry Hernández (CUB)	360 kg	Santo Domingo, Dominican Republic	14 August 2003

The following records were established during the competition:

Clean & Jerk	203 kg	José Oliver Ruiz (COL)	GR
Total	363 kg	Jadier Valladares (CUB)	GR

== Results ==
Rank	Athlete	Nation	Group	Body weight	Snatch (kg)					Clean & Jerk (kg)					Total
Rank	Athlete	Nation	Group	Body weight	1	2	3	Result	Rank	1	2	3	Result	Rank	Total
1st place, gold medalist(s)	José Oliver Ruiz	Colombia	A	84.45	155	~~160~~	160	160	2	197	203	–	203	1	363
2nd place, silver medalist(s)	Jadier Valladares	Cuba	A	84.50	155	161	~~165~~	161	1	195	202	~~205~~	202	2	363
3rd place, bronze medalist(s)	Herbys Márquez	Venezuela	A	84.25	155	~~160~~	~~160~~	155	4	195	~~201~~	~~201~~	195	3	350
4	Kendrick Farris	United States	A	84.15	150	155	158	158	3	191	~~195~~	~~197~~	191	4	349
5	Juan Quiterio	Dominican Republic	A	84.35	145	~~148~~	~~148~~	145	5	175	185	~~190~~	185	5	330
6	Buck Ramsay	Canada	A	84.75	135	140	~~143~~	140	7	~~170~~	170	178	178	6	318
7	Rafael Andrade	Brazil	A	83.75	132	140	~~143~~	140	6	170	175	~~180~~	175	7	315
8	Edward Silva	Uruguay	A	84.10	115	120	~~123~~	120	8	145	150	~~155~~	150	8	270
