= Weightlifting at the 2010 Central American and Caribbean Games =

Event held in Mayagüez, Puerto Rico

- Venue: Dr. Juan Sanchez Acevedo Coliseum
- Location: Mayagüez
- Dates: 18–22 July

The Weightlifting competition at the 2010 Central American and Caribbean Games was being held in Mayagüez, Puerto Rico.

The tournament was scheduled to be held from 18 to 22 July at the Dr. Juan Sanchez Acevedo Coliseum at Porta del Sol.

== Medal summary ==
=== Men's events ===
| Event | Gold | | Silver | | Bronze | |
|---|---|---|---|---|---|---|
| 56 kg | Habib de las Salas; Colombia | 257 kg | Julio Salamanca; El Salvador | 252 kg | Carlos Berna; Colombia | 251 kg |
| 56 kg Snatch | Habib de las Salas; Colombia | 114 kg | Ronald Peña; Dominican Republic | 111 kg | Julio Salamanca; El Salvador | 111 kg |
| 56 kg Clean&Jerk | Habib de las Salas; Colombia | 143 kg | Julio Salamanca; Colombia | 143 kg | Carlos Berna; El Salvador | 141 kg |
| 62 kg | Diego Salazar; Colombia | 298 kg | Jesús López; Venezuela | 291 kg | José Peguero; Dominican Republic | 268 kg |
| 62 kg Snatch | Diego Salazar; Colombia | 133 kg | Jesús López; Venezuela | 128 kg | José Peguero; Dominican Republic | 123 kg |
| 62 kg Clean&Jerk | Diego Salazar; Colombia | 165 kg | Jesús López; Venezuela | 163 kg | José Peguero; Dominican Republic | 145 kg |
| 69 kg | Junior Sanchez; Venezuela | 306 kg | Hugo Montes; Colombia | 300 kg | Edwin Mosquera; Colombia | 299 kg |
| 69 kg Snatch | Junior Sanchez; Venezuela | 144 kg | Edwin Mosquera; Colombia | 137 kg | Hugo Montes; Colombia | 136 kg |
| 69 kg Clean&Jerk | Hugo Montes; Colombia | 164 kg | Junior Sanchez; Venezuela | 162 kg | Edwin Mosquera; Colombia | 162 kg |
| 77 kg | Jhony Andica; Colombia | 324 kg | José Ocando; Venezuela | 321 kg | Carlos Sauri; Puerto Rico | 304 kg |
| 77 kg Snatch | Jhony Andica; Colombia | 144 kg | Carlos Sauri; Puerto Rico | 144 kg | José Ocando; Venezuela | 140 kg |
| 77 kg Clean&Jerk | José Ocando; Puerto Rico | 181 kg | Carlos Sauri; Colombia | 180 kg | Víctor Viquez; Panama | 175 kg |
| 85 kg | Carlos Andica; Colombia | 352 kg | Herbys Márquez; Venezuela | 344 kg | Eustaciano Arias; Panama | 300 kg |
| 85 kg Snatch | Carlos Andica; Colombia | 158 kg | Herbys Márquez; Venezuela | 150 kg | Gabriel Mestre; Puerto Rico | 132 kg |
| 85 kg Clean&Jerk | Herbys Márquez; Venezuela | 194 kg | Carlos Andica; Colombia | 194 kg | Eustaciano Arias; Panama | 168 kg |
| 94 kg | Wilmer Torres; Colombia | 355 kg | Octavio Mejías; Venezuela | 345 kg | Moisés Cartagena; Puerto Rico | 335 kg |
| 94 kg Snatch | Wilmer Torres; Colombia | 160 kg | Octavio Mejías; Venezuela | 155 kg | Moisés Cartagena; Puerto Rico | 150 kg |
| 94 kg Clean&Jerk | Wilmer Torres; Colombia | 195 kg | Octavio Mejías; Venezuela | 190 kg | Roberto Rosado; Puerto Rico | 185 kg |
| 105 kg | Julio Luna; Venezuela | 361 kg | Leomar Albarran; Venezuela | 354 kg | José Familia; Dominican Republic | 344 kg |
| 105 kg Snatch | Julio Luna; Venezuela | 161 kg | Carlos Holguín; Dominican Republic | 160 kg | Leomar Albarran; Venezuela | 159 kg |
| 105 kg Clean&Jerk | Julio Luna; Venezuela | 200 kg | Leomar Albarran; Venezuela | 195 kg | José Familia; Dominican Republic | 192 kg |
| +105 kg | Yoel Morales; Venezuela | 383 kg | Manuel Campos; Costa Rica | 360 kg | Christian Lopez; Guatemala | 358 kg |
| +105 kg Snatch | Christian Lopez; Guatemala | 168 kg | Yoel Morales; Venezuela | 165 kg | Manuel Campos; Costa Rica | 160 kg |
| +105 kg Clean&Jerk | Yoel Morales; Venezuela | 218 kg | Manuel Campos; Costa Rica | 200 kg | Francisco Durán; Dominican Republic | 192 kg |

=== Women's events ===
| Event | Gold | | Silver | | Bronze | |
|---|---|---|---|---|---|---|
| 48 kg | Carolina Valencia; Mexico | 176 kg | Lely Burgos; Puerto Rico | 169 kg | Carmen Echevarría; Puerto Rico | 164 kg |
| 48 kg Snatch | Carolina Valencia; Mexico | 78 kg | Guillermina Candelario; Dominican Republic | 71 kg | Lely Burgos; Puerto Rico | 71 kg |
| 48 kg Clean&Jerk | Carolina Valencia; Mexico | 98 kg | Lely Burgos; Puerto Rico | 98 kg | Carmen Echevarría; Puerto Rico | 94 kg |
| 53 kg | Yuderquis Contreras; Dominican Republic | 213 kg | Rusmeris Villar; Colombia | 194 kg | Inmara Henríquez; Venezuela | 193 kg |
| 53 kg Snatch | Yuderquis Contreras; Dominican Republic | 96 kg | Rusmeris Villar; Colombia | 88 kg | Yineisy Reyes; Dominican Republic | 87 kg |
| 53 kg Clean&Jerk | Yuderquis Contreras; Dominican Republic | 117 kg | Inmara Henríquez; Venezuela | 110 kg | Rusmeris Villar; Colombia | 106 kg |
| 58 kg | Jackelina Heredia; Colombia | 210 kg | Geralee Vega; Puerto Rico | 205 kg | Mónica Domínguez; Mexico | 203 kg |
| 58 kg Snatch | Mónica Domínguez; Mexico | 93 kg | Jackelina Heredia; Colombia | 91 kg | Geralee Vega; Puerto Rico | 90 kg |
| 58 kg Clean&Jerk | Jackelina Heredia; Colombia | 119 kg | Geralee Vega; Puerto Rico | 115 kg | Mónica Domínguez; Mexico | 110 kg |
| 63 kg | Mercedes Pérez; Colombia | 229 kg | Nísida Palomeque; Colombia | 228 kg | Luz Acosta; Mexico | 220 kg |
| 63 kg Snatch | Nísida Palomeque; Colombia | 100 kg | Luz Acosta; Mexico | 99 kg | Mercedes Pérez; Colombia | 98 kg |
| 63 kg Clean&Jerk | Mercedes Pérez; Colombia | 131 kg | Nísida Palomeque; Colombia | 128 kg | Luz Acosta; Mexico | 121 kg |
| 69 kg | Leydi Solís; Colombia | 240 kg | Cinthya Domínguez; Mexico | 226 kg | Solenny Villasmil; Venezuela | 219 kg |
| 69 kg Snatch | Leydi Solís; Colombia | 106 kg | Cinthya Domínguez; Mexico | 105 kg | Solenny Villasmil; Venezuela | 98 kg |
| 69 kg Clean&Jerk | Leydi Solís; Colombia | 134 kg | Solenny Villasmil; Venezuela | 121 kg | Norma Figueroa; Puerto Rico | 121 kg |
| 75 kg | Ubaldina Valoyes; Colombia | 240 kg | Yarvanis Herrera; Venezuela | 227 kg | Damaris Aguirre; Mexico | 227 kg |
| 75 kg Snatch | Ubaldina Valoyes; Colombia | 108 kg | Yarvanis Herrera; Venezuela | 105 kg | Damaris Aguirre; Mexico | 101 kg |
| 75 kg Clean&Jerk | Ubaldina Valoyes; Colombia | 132 kg | Damaris Aguirre; Mexico | 126 kg | Patricia Figueroa; Puerto Rico | 125 kg |
| +75 kg | Yaniuska Espinosa; Venezuela | 243 kg | Wilma Cotto; Puerto Rico | 239 kg | Cristina Suarez; Venezuela | 232 kg |
| +75 kg Snatch | Yaniuska Espinosa; Venezuela | 108 kg | Wilma Cotto; Puerto Rico | 104 kg | Cristina Suarez; Venezuela | 101 kg |
| +75 kg Clean&Jerk | Yaniuska Espinosa; Venezuela | 135 kg | Wilma Cotto; Puerto Rico | 135 kg | Cristina Suarez; Venezuela | 131 kg |
