= Weightlifting at the 2003 Pan American Games =

This page shows the results of the Weightlifting Competition at the 2003 Pan American Games, held from August 12 to August 16, 2003 in Santo Domingo, Dominican Republic. There were a total number of fifteen medal events, eight for men and seven for women.

== Men's competition ==
=== Flyweight (– 56 kg) ===
- Held on 2003-08-12

RANK	NAME WEIGHTLIFTER
Gold medal	Nelson Castro (COL)
Silver medal	Tomas Aquino (DOM)
Bronze medal	David Mendoza (HON)
4.	Marvin López (ESA)
5.	Luis Medrano (GUA)

=== Featherweight (– 62 kg) ===
- Held on 2003-08-12

RANK	NAME WEIGHTLIFTER
Gold medal	Diego Salazar (COL)
Silver medal	Vladimir Rodríguez (CUB)
Bronze medal	Israel José Rubio (VEN)
4.	José Erazo (ECU)
5.	Juan Reyes (ESA)
6.	Wellington Mendes (BRA)
8.	Welisson Silva (BRA)

=== Lightweight (– 69 kg) ===
- Held on 2003-08-13

RANK	NAME WEIGHTLIFTER
Gold medal	Yordanis Borrero (CUB)
Silver medal	Amílcar Pernia (VEN)
Bronze medal	Aristóteles Fuentes (CUB)
4.	Jorge Enrique Guiza (COL)
5.	Santo Rivera (DOM)
—	Julio Idrovo (ECU)

=== Middleweight (– 77 kg) ===
- Held on 2003-08-14

RANK	NAME WEIGHTLIFTER
Gold medal	Chad Vaughn (USA)
Silver medal	Ferney Manzano (COL)
Bronze medal	Octavio Mejías (VEN)
4.	Osley Pedroso (CUB)
5.	Walter Llerena (ECU)
6.	Carlos Espeleta (ARG)
7.	Francisco Caceras (ESA)
8.	Greg Schouten (USA)

=== Light-heavyweight (– 85 kg) ===
- Held on 2003-08-14

RANK	NAME WEIGHTLIFTER
Gold medal	Héctor Ballesteros (COL)
Silver medal	Yoandry Hernández (CUB)
Bronze medal	José Oliver Ruiz (COL)
4.	Oscar Chaplin III (USA)
5.	Dimitri Gontcharenko (ARG)
6.	Edward Silva (URU)

=== Middle-heavyweight (– 94 kg) ===
- Held on 2003-08-15

RANK	NAME WEIGHTLIFTER
Gold medal	Julio César Luña (VEN)
Silver medal	Darío Lecman (ARG)
Bronze medal	Jairo Cossio (COL)
4.	Joel Mackenzie (CUB)
5.	Jason Gump (USA)
6.	Héctor Pineda (VEN)
7.	Mario Castro (DOM)
8.	Robert Murphy (USA)

=== Heavyweight (– 105 kg) ===
- Held on 2003-08-16

RANK	NAME WEIGHTLIFTER
Gold medal	Boris Burov (ECU)
Silver medal	Michel Batista (CUB)
Bronze medal	William Solís (COL)
4.	Peter Kelley (USA)
5.	Akos Sandor (CAN)
6.	Sacha Amede (CAN)
7.	Erick Cornejo (ESA)
8.	Carlos Holguín (DOM)

=== Super heavyweight (+ 105 kg) ===
- Held on 2003-08-16

RANK	NAME WEIGHTLIFTER
Gold medal	Hidelgar Morillo (VEN)
Silver medal	Cristian Escalante (CHI)
Bronze medal	Plaiter Reyes (DOM)
4.	Casey Burgener (USA)
5.	Roque Reynoso (DOM)
6.	Joel Bran (GUA)
7.	William Campos (BOL)
—	Shane Hamman (USA)

== Women's competition ==
=== Flyweight (– 48 kg) ===
- Held on 2003-08-12

RANK	NAME WEIGHTLIFTER
Gold medal	Tara Nott (USA)
Silver medal	Guillermina Candelario (DOM)
Bronze medal	Remigia Arcila (VEN)
4.	Elohim García (MEX)
5.	Jodi Wilhite (USA)
6.	Silvia Lucero (ESA)
7.	Jenny González (ECU)
8.	Olvina Gomez (GUA)
10.	Valdirene Aparecida Maia (BRA)

=== Featherweight (– 53 kg) ===
- Held on 2003-08-13

RANK	NAME WEIGHTLIFTER
Gold medal	Mabel Mosquera (COL)
Silver medal	Yudelquis Contreras (DOM)
Bronze medal	Wendy Amparo (DOM)
4.	Karla Fernández (VEN)
5.	Ana Lemos (COL)
6.	Daniela Ruiloba (ECU)
7.	Rafaela Sebastião (BRA)

=== Lightweight (– 58 kg) ===
- Held on 2003-08-13

RANK	NAME WEIGHTLIFTER
Gold medal	María Escobar (ECU)
Silver medal	Soraya Jiménez (MEX)
Bronze medal	Gretty Lugo (VEN)
4.	Maryse Turcotte (CAN)
5.	Miel McGerrigle (CAN)
6.	Heridania Vazquez (DOM)
7.	Carrie Boudreau (USA)
8.	Olga Ruano (GUA)

=== Middleweight (– 63 kg) ===
- Held on 2003-08-14

RANK	NAME WEIGHTLIFTER
Gold medal	Ubaldina Valoyes (COL)
Silver medal	Solenny Villasmil (VEN)
Bronze medal	Luz Mercedes Acosta (MEX)
4.	Carissa Gordon (USA)
5.	Ruth Rivera (PUR)
6.	Mercedes Fernández (ARG)
7.	Solsiris Francisco (PUR)
8.	Christine Girard (CAN)

=== Light-heavyweight (– 69 kg) ===
- Held on 2003-08-15

RANK	NAME WEIGHTLIFTER
Gold medal	Tulia Angela Medina (COL)
Silver medal	Eva María Dimas (ESA)
Bronze medal	Miosotis Heredia (DOM)
4.	Damaris Aguirre (MEX)
5.	Elsa Caldera (NCA)
6.	Shindell King (GUY)

=== Heavyweight (– 75 kg) ===
- Held on 2003-08-15

RANK	NAME WEIGHTLIFTER
Gold medal	Wanda Rijo (DOM)
Silver medal	Nora Koppel (ARG)
Bronze medal	Raquel López (VEN)
4.	Cara Heads (USA)
5.	Doreen Heldt (USA)
6.	Susana Calderon (ESA)

=== Super heavyweight (+ 75 kg) ===
- Held on 2003-08-16

RANK	NAME WEIGHTLIFTER
Gold medal	Carmenza Delgado (COL)
Silver medal	Seledina Nieve (ECU)
Bronze medal	María Carvajal (DOM)
4.	Gracielis Vega (PUR)
5.	Susanne Dandenault (CAN)
6.	Nubia Solis (COL)
7.	Eldy Salazar (BOL)

== Medal table ==
Rank	Country	Gold	Silver	Bronze	Total
1	Colombia	7	1	3	11
2	Venezuela	2	2	5	9
3	Ecuador	2	1	0	3
4	United States	2	0	0	2
5	Dominican Republic	1	3	4	8
6	Cuba	1	3	1	6
7	Argentina	0	2	0	2
8	Mexico	0	1	1	2
9	El Salvador	0	1	0	1
9	Chile	0	1	0	1
11	Honduras	0	0	1	1

== See also ==
- Weightlifting at the 2004 Summer Olympics
