= Weightlifting at the 2006 Central American and Caribbean Games =

- Location: Cartagena
- Dates: 15-20 July

The Weightlifting Competition at the 2006 Central American and Caribbean Games was held in Cartagena, Colombia from July 15 to July 20, 2006. The event was open to both men and women.

== Medal summary ==
=== Men ===
Event	Gold		Silver		Bronze	
-56 kg
Snatch	Victor Castellanos; Venezuela	122.0	Sergio Álvarez Boulet; Cuba	122.0	Nelson Castro; Colombia	112.0
Clean & Jerk	Sergio Álvarez Boulet; Cuba	152.0	Victor Castellanos; Venezuela	145.0	Nelson Castro; Colombia	140.0
Total	Sergio Álvarez Boulet; Cuba	274.0	Victor Castellanos; Venezuela	267.0	Nelson Castro; Colombia	252.0
-62 kg
Snatch	Oscar Figueroa; Colombia	137.0	Adan Rosales; Cuba	131.0	Diego Salazar; Colombia	130.0
Clean & Jerk	Adan Rosales; Cuba	167.0	Diego Salazar; Colombia	162.0	Oscar Figueroa; Colombia	160.0
Total	Adan Rosales; Cuba	298.0	Oscar Figueroa; Colombia	297.0	Diego Salazar; Colombia	292.0
-69 kg
Snatch	Yordanis Borrero; Cuba	140.0	Victor Viquez; Panama	127.0	Wilfredo Martinez; Puerto Rico	126.0
Clean & Jerk	Eduardo Ernan; Venezuela	170.0	Yordanis Borrero; Cuba	165.0	Raul Flores; Mexico	156.0
Total	Yordanis Borrero; Cuba	305.0	Victor Viquez; Panama	283.0	Raul Flores; Mexico	271.0
-77 kg
Snatch	Ivan Cambar; Cuba	150.0	Carlos Andica; Colombia	150.0	Octavio Mejias; Venezuela	145.0
Clean & Jerk	Carlos Andica; Colombia	187.0	Ivan Cambar; Cuba	186.0	Santo Rivera; Dominican Republic	183.0
Total	Carlos Andica; Colombia	337.0	Ivan Cambar; Cuba	336.0	Santo Rivera; Dominican Republic	326.0
-85 kg
Snatch	Hector Ballesteros; Colombia	163.0	Jadier Valladares; Cuba	162.0	José Oliver Ruiz; Colombia	157.0
Clean & Jerk	José Oliver Ruiz; Colombia	202.0	Hector Ballesteros; Colombia	201.0	Jadier Valladares; Cuba	191.0
Total	Hector Ballesteros; Colombia	364.0	José Oliver Ruiz; Colombia	359.0	Jadier Valladares; Cuba	354.0
-94 kg
Snatch	Yoandry Hernández; Cuba	167.0	Jairo Cossio; Colombia	165.0	Angel Daza; Venezuela	152.0
Clean & Jerk	Yoandry Hernández; Cuba	208.0	Angel Daza; Venezuela	196.0	Jairo Cossio; Colombia	195.0
Total	Yoandry Hernández; Cuba	375.0	Jairo Cossio; Colombia	360.0	Angel Daza; Venezuela	348.0
-105 kg
Snatch	Joel McKenzie; Cuba	177.0	Julio Luna; Venezuela	170.0	Carlos Holguín; Dominican Republic	148.0
Clean & Jerk	Julio Luna; Venezuela	215.0	Joel McKenzie; Cuba	215.0	Rodrigo Narvaez; Nicaragua	175.0
Total	Joel McKenzie; Cuba	392.0	Julio Luna; Venezuela	385.0	Carlos Holguín; Dominican Republic	318.0
+105 kg
Snatch	Sertanis Teran; Cuba	172.0	William Solis; Colombia	171.0	Francisco Rizo; Mexico	156.0
Clean & Jerk	William Solis; Colombia	210.0	Hildegar Morillo; Venezuela	206.0	Sertanis Teran; Cuba	205.0
Total	William Solis; Colombia	381.0	Sertanis Teran; Cuba	377.0	Francisco Duran; Dominican Republic	342.0

=== Women ===
Event	Gold		Silver		Bronze	
-48 kg
Snatch	Carolina Valencia; Mexico	77.0	Remigia Arcila; Venezuela	74.0	Yusmeira Fuentes; Venezuela	70.0
Clean & Jerk	Carolina Valencia; Mexico	97.0	Remigia Arcila; Venezuela	95.0	Guillermina Candelario; Dominican Republic	91.0
Total	Carolina Valencia; Mexico	174.0	Remigia Arcila; Venezuela	169.0	Guillermina Candelario; Dominican Republic	160.0
-53 kg
Snatch	Rusmeris Villar; Colombia	84.0	Ana Lemus; Colombia	83.0	Betsi Rivas; Venezuela	78.0
Clean & Jerk	Ana Lemus; Colombia	109.0	Rusmeris Villar; Colombia	108.0	Betsi Rivas; Venezuela	100.0
Total	Ana Lemus; Colombia	192.0	Rusmeris Villar; Colombia	192.0	Betsi Rivas; Venezuela	178.0
-58 kg
Snatch	Yuderqui Contreras; Dominican Republic	95.0	Mercedes Perez; Colombia	93.0	Grety Lugo; Venezuela	87.0
Clean & Jerk	Grety Lugo; Venezuela	112.0	Yuderqui Contreras; Dominican Republic	111.0	Geralee Vega; Puerto Rico	105.0
Total	Yuderqui Contreras; Dominican Republic	206.0	Grety Lugo; Venezuela	199.0	Geralee Vega; Puerto Rico	185.0
-63 kg
Snatch	Leydi Solís; Colombia	95.0	Luz Acosta; Mexico	92.0	Liliana Borbon; Mexico	85.0
Clean & Jerk	Luz Acosta; Mexico	120.0	Leydi Solís; Colombia	115.0	Liliana Borbon; Mexico	111.0
Total	Luz Acosta; Mexico	212.0	Leydi Solís; Colombia	210.0	Liliana Borbon; Mexico	196.0
-69 kg
Snatch	Tulia Medina; Colombia	102.0	Cinthya Dominguez; Mexico	96.0	Norma Figueroa; Puerto Rico	79.0
Clean & Jerk	Cinthya Dominguez; Mexico	119.0	Tulia Medina; Colombia	118.0	Norma Figueroa; Puerto Rico	100.0
Total	Tulia Medina; Colombia	220.0	Cinthya Dominguez; Mexico	215.0	Norma Figueroa; Puerto Rico	179.0
-75 kg
Snatch	Ubaldina Valoyes; Colombia	105.0	Damaris Aguirre; Mexico	105.0	Claret Bellorin; Venezuela	100.0
Clean & Jerk	Ubaldina Valoyes; Colombia	128.0	Claret Bellorin; Venezuela	122.0	Natividad Dominguez; Dominican Republic	122.0
Total	Ubaldina Valoyes; Colombia	233.0	Claret Bellorin; Venezuela	222.0	Natividad Domínguez; Dominican Republic	222.0
+75 kg
Snatch	Carmenza Delgado; Colombia	116.0	Eva Dimas; El Salvador	115.0	Olivia Salinas; Mexico	101.0
Clean & Jerk	Carmenza Delgado; Colombia	143.0	Eva Dimas; El Salvador	142.0	Cristina Suarez; Venezuela	131.0
Total	Carmenza Delgado; Colombia	259.0	Eva Dimas; El Salvador	257.0	Cristina Suarez; Venezuela	232.0

== Men's competition ==
=== Bantamweight (– 56 kg) ===
Rank	Name	B.weight (kg)	Snatch (kg)	Clean & Jerk (kg)	Total (kg)
1st place, gold medalist(s)	Sergio Álvarez (CUB)	55.75	122	152	274
2nd place, silver medalist(s)	Víctor Castellanos (VEN)	55.70	122	145	267
3rd place, bronze medalist(s)	Nelson Castro (COL)	55.60	112	140	252
4	Marvin Lopez (ESA)	55.65	105	135	240
5	José Canto (MEX)	55.80	107	132	239
6	Manuel Romo (MEX)	55.75	105	130	235
7	Jeferson García (NCA)	55.80	82	100	182

=== Featherweight (– 62 kg) ===
Rank	Name	B.weight (kg)	Snatch (kg)	Clean & Jerk (kg)	Total (kg)
1st place, gold medalist(s)	Adan Rosales (CUB)	61.85	131	167	298
2nd place, silver medalist(s)	Óscar Figueroa (COL)	61.55	137	160	297
3rd place, bronze medalist(s)	Diego Fernando Salazar (COL)	61.85	130	162	292
4	Tomás Arias (DOM)	61.25	115	142	257
5	Oscar Valdizón (GUA)	61.95	115	140	255
6	David Mendoza (HON)	61.20	97	125	222
–	Jesús Lopez (VEN)	61.60	–	155	–

=== Lightweight (– 69 kg) ===
Rank	Name	B.weight (kg)	Snatch (kg)	Clean & Jerk (kg)	Total (kg)
1st place, gold medalist(s)	Yordanis Borrero (CUB)	68.60	140	165	305
2nd place, silver medalist(s)	Víctor Viquez (PAN)	68.60	127	160	287
3rd place, bronze medalist(s)	Raul Flores (MEX)	68.40	115	156	271
4	Wilfredo Martínez (PUR)	68.95	126	145	271
5	Maximo Viquez (PAN)	68.60	120	135	255
–	Eduardo Hernán (VEN)	68.45	–	170	–

=== Middleweight (– 77 kg) ===
Rank	Name	B.weight (kg)	Snatch (kg)	Clean & Jerk (kg)	Total (kg)
1st place, gold medalist(s)	Carlos Andica (COL)	76.65	150	187	337
2nd place, silver medalist(s)	Iván Cambar (CUB)	76.05	150	186	336
3rd place, bronze medalist(s)	Santo Rivera (DOM)	75.15	143	183	326
4	Octavio Mejías (VEN)	76.40	145	180	325
5	Esteban Radilla (MEX)	76.45	132	160	292
6	Antonio Moncada (HON)	74.30	115	145	260
–	José Ocando (VEN)	76.95	132	–	–

=== Light-Heavyweight (– 85 kg) ===
Rank	Name	B.weight (kg)	Snatch (kg)	Clean & Jerk (kg)	Total (kg)
1st place, gold medalist(s)	Héctor Ballesteros (COL)	83.75	163	201	364
2nd place, silver medalist(s)	José Oliver Ruíz (COL)	83.95	157	202	359
3rd place, bronze medalist(s)	Jadier Valladares (CUB)	82.40	162	192	354
4	Juan Quiterio (DOM)	83.20	147	187	334
5	Eustaciano Arías (PAN)	84.00	132	166	298
6	Henrry Coy (GUA)	83.90	125	160	285

=== Middle-Heavyweight (– 94 kg) ===
Rank	Name	B.weight (kg)	Snatch (kg)	Clean & Jerk (kg)	Total (kg)
1st place, gold medalist(s)	Yoandry Hernández (CUB)	91.70	167	208	375
2nd place, silver medalist(s)	Jairo Cossio (COL)	92.30	165	195	360
3rd place, bronze medalist(s)	Angel Daza (VEN)	93.70	152	196	348
4	Mario Castro (DOM)	91.30	151	177	328

=== Heavyweight (– 105 kg) ===
Rank	Name	B.weight (kg)	Snatch (kg)	Clean & Jerk (kg)	Total (kg)
1st place, gold medalist(s)	Joël MacKenzie (CUB)	100.35	177	215	392
2nd place, silver medalist(s)	Julio César Luña (VEN)	99.80	170	215	385
3rd place, bronze medalist(s)	Carlos Holguín (DOM)	97.75	148	170	318
4	Rodrigo Narvaez (NCA)	104.05	141	175	316
–	Ivorn McKnee (BAR)	101.20	140	–	–

=== Super-Heavyweight (+ 105 kg) ===
Rank	Name	B.weight (kg)	Snatch (kg)	Clean & Jerk (kg)	Total (kg)
1st place, gold medalist(s)	William Solis (COL)	111.95	171	210	381
2nd place, silver medalist(s)	Sertanis Teran (CUB)	111.30	172	205	377
3rd place, bronze medalist(s)	Francisco Durán (DOM)	176.00	152	190	342
4	Héctor Rizo (MEX)	119.85	156	176	332
5	Roque Reinoso (DOM)	152.80	100	185	285
6	Jean Díaz (NCA)	118.70	110	150	260
–	Herve Ruiz (ARU)	108.45	128	–	–
–	Álvaro Jaen (PAN)	109.60	140	–	–
–	Hildegar Morillo (VEN)	191.35	–	206	–

== Women's competition ==
=== Flyweight (– 48 kg) ===
Rank	Name	B.weight (kg)	Snatch (kg)	Clean & Jerk (kg)	Total (kg)
1st place, gold medalist(s)	Carolina Valencia (MEX)	47.90	77	97	174
2nd place, silver medalist(s)	Remigia Arcila (VEN)	47.90	74	96	170
3rd place, bronze medalist(s)	Guillermina Candelario (DOM)	47.75	69	91	160
4	Yusmaira Fuentes (VEN)	47.95	70	80	150
5	Karen Berrios (HON)	47.25	57	75	132
6	Tamy Gómez (HON)	47.85	57	70	127
7	Mariela Rosabal (CUB)	46.55	47	57	104

=== Featherweight (– 53 kg) ===
Rank	Name	B.weight (kg)	Snatch (kg)	Clean & Jerk (kg)	Total (kg)
1st place, gold medalist(s)	Ana Margot Lemos (COL)	52.70	83	109	192
2nd place, silver medalist(s)	Rusmeris Villar (COL)	53.00	84	108	192
3rd place, bronze medalist(s)	Betsi Rivas (VEN)	52.20	78	100	178
4	Marina Reyes (MEX)	52.75	75	97	172
5	Claritza Francisco (DOM)	53.00	75	95	170
6	Widalys Arroyo (PUR)	53.00	67	95	162
7	Heidi Silva (DOM)	52.95	74	85	159
8	Yamilka Alvarez (CUB)	50.40	54	65	119

=== Lightweight (– 58 kg) ===
Rank	Name	B.weight (kg)	Snatch (kg)	Clean & Jerk (kg)	Total (kg)
1st place, gold medalist(s)	Yuderqui Contreras (DOM)	55.20	95	111	206
2nd place, silver medalist(s)	Gretty Lugo (VEN)	57.65	87	112	199
3rd place, bronze medalist(s)	Geralee Vega (PUR)	57.75	80	105	185
4	Marlene Almarales (CUB)	57.05	45	55	100
–	Mercedes Pérez (COL)	57.20	93	–	–

=== Middleweight (– 63 kg) ===
Rank	Name	B.weight (kg)	Snatch (kg)	Clean & Jerk (kg)	Total (kg)
1st place, gold medalist(s)	Luz Acosta (MEX)	62.90	92	120	212
2nd place, silver medalist(s)	Leydi Solís (COL)	62.25	95	115	210
3rd place, bronze medalist(s)	Liliana Borbon (MEX)	62.70	85	111	196
4	Judith Chacón (VEN)	58.45	82	108	190
5	Yusleivy Bolaño (CUB)	62.05	57	72	129

=== Light-Heavyweight (– 69 kg) ===
Rank	Name	B.weight (kg)	Snatch (kg)	Clean & Jerk (kg)	Total (kg)
1st place, gold medalist(s)	Tulia Angela Medina (COL)	68.00	102	118	220
2nd place, silver medalist(s)	Cinthya Domínguez (MEX)	68.35	96	119	215
3rd place, bronze medalist(s)	Norma Figueroa (PUR)	67.55	79	100	179
4	Laura Ramsey (TRI)	68.55	79	90	169

=== Heavyweight (– 75 kg) ===
Rank	Name	B.weight (kg)	Snatch (kg)	Clean & Jerk (kg)	Total (kg)
1st place, gold medalist(s)	Ubaldina Valoyes (COL)	70.60	105	128	233
2nd place, silver medalist(s)	Claret Bellorin (VEN)	74.20	100	122	222
3rd place, bronze medalist(s)	Natividad Domínguez (DOM)	75.00	100	122	222
4	Wanda Rijo (DOM)	74.25	95	114	209
5	Indira Salinas (CUB)	73.75	67	87	154
–	Damaris Aguirre (MEX)	74.75	105	–	–
–	Rosita De Leon (GUA)	74.10	–	100	–

=== Super-Heavyweight (+ 75 kg) ===
Rank	Name	B.weight (kg)	Snatch (kg)	Clean & Jerk (kg)	Total (kg)
1st place, gold medalist(s)	Carmenza Delgado (COL)	93.40	116	143	259
2nd place, silver medalist(s)	Eva Dimas (ESA)	81.80	115	142	257
3rd place, bronze medalist(s)	Cristina Suarez (VEN)	101.30	101	131	232
4	Olivia Salinas (MEX)	94.95	101	130	231
5	Yinely Burgos (DOM)	95.80	99	126	225
6	Lexys Diago (CUB)	93.80	72	90	162
–	Amada Charles (PUR)	110.50	–	120	–

== See also ==
- Weightlifting at the 2007 Pan American Games
