= Weightlifting at the 2010 South American Games – Men's 85kg =

The Men's 85 kg event at the 2010 South American Games was held over March 28 at 18:00.

== Medalists ==
Gold	Silver	Bronze
Herbys Márquez; Venezuela	Hector Fabio Ballesteros; Colombia	Julio Cesar Suarez; Ecuador

== Results ==
Rank	Athlete	Bodyweight	Snatch			Clean & Jerk			Total
Rank	Athlete	Bodyweight	1	2	3	1	2	3	Total
1st place, gold medalist(s)	Herbys Márquez (VEN)	85.00	~~152~~	152	~~156~~	192	197	~~201~~	349
2nd place, silver medalist(s)	Hector Fabio Ballesteros (COL)	83.35	152	155	~~157~~	190	193	~~196~~	348
3rd place, bronze medalist(s)	Julio Cesar Suarez (ECU)	83.83	150	~~156~~	~~156~~	167	~~171~~	171	321
4	Carlos Espeleta (ARG)	83.97	135	140	~~145~~	165	170	~~182~~	310
5	Douglas Costa (BRA)	84.40	~~125~~	125	~~130~~	~~170~~	~~170~~	170	295
6	Jorge Julio Contreras (CHI)	84.50	~~125~~	125	~~130~~	155	163	~~170~~	288
7	Fabian Pereyra (ARG)	83.90	120	125	130	150	155	~~160~~	285
8	Alex Alayan (URU)	82.44	105	110	115	150	~~156~~	~~159~~	265
9	Leonardo Sanabria Diaz (PAR)	82.34	85	87	90	~~108~~	110	115	205
	Carlos Andica (COL)	84.25	153	~~157~~	~~157~~	~~190~~	~~190~~	~~190~~	DNF
