= List of Argentine records in Olympic weightlifting =

The following are the national records in Olympic weightlifting in Argentina. Records are maintained in each weight class for the snatch lift, clean and jerk lift, and the total for both lifts by the Federación Argentina de Pesas.

== Current records ==
=== Women ===
Event	Record	Athlete	Date	Meet	Place	Ref
49 kg
Snatch						
Clean & Jerk						
Total						
53 kg
Snatch						
Clean & Jerk						
Total						
57 kg
Snatch						
Clean & Jerk						
Total						
61 kg
Snatch	98 kg	María Paz Casadevall	6 October 2026	Pan American Junior Championships	Tepic, Mexico	
Clean & Jerk	121 kg	María Paz Casadevall	6 October 2026	Pan American Junior Championships	Tepic, Mexico	
Total	219 kg	María Paz Casadevall	6 October 2026	Pan American Junior Championships	Tepic, Mexico	
69 kg
Snatch						
Clean & Jerk						
Total						
77 kg
Snatch						
Clean & Jerk						
Total						
86 kg
Snatch						
Clean & Jerk						
Total						
+86 kg
Snatch						
Clean & Jerk						
Total						

== Historical records ==
=== Men (2018-2025) ===
Event	Record	Athlete	Date	Meet	Place	Ref
55 kg
Snatch	103 kg	Standard				
Clean & Jerk	136 kg	Domingo Meza	10 August 2024			
Total	239 kg	Domingo Meza	10 August 2024			
61 kg
Snatch	111 kg	Tobías Ruiz	14 October 2023			
Clean & Jerk	141 kg	Tobías Ruiz	10 June 2023			
Total	250 kg	Standard				
67 kg
Snatch	128 kg	Nahuel Jiménes	19 June 2021			
Clean & Jerk	160 kg	Mariano Calabró	5 December 2020			
Total	288 kg	Nahuel Jiménes	19 June 2021			
73 kg
Snatch	133 kg	Nicolás Rivero	8 October 2022			
Clean & Jerk	163 kg	Nicolás Rivero	2 September 2023			
Total	295 kg	Nicolás Rivero	2 September 2023			
81 kg
Snatch	146 kg	Dante Pizzuti	10 July 2023			
Clean & Jerk	180 kg	Dante Pizzuti	18 October 2021			
Total	323 kg	Dante Pizzuti	10 July 2023			
89 kg
Snatch	150 kg	Maximiliano Kienitz	11 March 2023			
Clean & Jerk	184 kg	Maximiliano Kienitz	11 May 2019	South American Championships	Palmira, Colombia	
Total	332 kg	Maximiliano Kienitz	11 May 2019	South American Championships	Palmira, Colombia	
96 kg
Snatch	150 kg	Maximiliano Kienitz	13 April 2019			
Clean & Jerk	190 kg	Joaquín Jones	12 October 2024			
Total	333 kg	Joaquín Jones	12 October 2024			
102 kg
Snatch	156 kg	Joaquín Mesa	2 September 2023			
Clean & Jerk	185 kg	Standard				
Total	337 kg	Joaquín Mesa	10 June 2023			
109 kg
Snatch	149 kg	Standard				
Clean & Jerk	190 kg	Standard				
Total	339 kg	Standard				
+109 kg
Snatch	159 kg	Standard				
Clean & Jerk	203 kg	Standard				
Total	362 kg	Standard				

=== Women (2018-2025) ===
Event	Record	Athlete	Date	Meet	Place	Ref
45 kg
Snatch	67 kg	Standard				
Clean & Jerk	86 kg	Standard				
Total	153 kg	Standard				
49 kg
Snatch	73 kg	Ludmila Gerzel	2 September 2023			
Clean & Jerk	92 kg	Ludmila Gerzel	2 September 2023			
Total	165 kg	Ludmila Gerzel	2 September 2023			
55 kg
Snatch	80 kg	Agustina Álvarez	16 December 2023			
Clean & Jerk	101 kg	Agustina Álvarez	10 August 2024			
Total	180 kg	Agustina Álvarez	16 December 2023			
59 kg
Snatch	94 kg	María Luz Casadevall	29 November 2024			
Clean & Jerk	117 kg	María Luz Casadevall	3 October 2022			
Total	211 kg	María Luz Casadevall	29 November 2024			
64 kg
Snatch	96 kg	María Luz Casadevall	21 April 2021	Pan American Championships	Santo Domingo, Dominican Republic	
Clean & Jerk	116 kg	María Luz Casadevall	27 November 2021	Junior Pan American Games	Palmira, Colombia	
Total	212 kg	María Luz Casadevall	27 November 2021	Junior Pan American Games	Palmira, Colombia	
71 kg
Snatch	95 kg	Tatiana Ullua	2 September 2023			
Clean & Jerk	117 kg	Standard				
Total	210 kg	Tatiana Ullua	2 September 2023			
76 kg
Snatch	96 kg	Standard				
Clean & Jerk	122 kg	Standard				
Total	218 kg	Standard				
81 kg
Snatch	99 kg	Standard				
Clean & Jerk	127 kg	Standard				
Total	226 kg	Standard				
87 kg
Snatch	103 kg	Standard				
Clean & Jerk	132 kg	Standard				
Total	235 kg	Standard				
+87 kg
Snatch	113 kg	Standard				
Clean & Jerk	143 kg	Standard				
Total	256 kg	Standard				

== Historical records ==
=== Men (1998–2018) ===
Event	Record	Athlete	Date	Meet	Place	Ref
-56 kg
Snatch	100 kg	Standard				
Clean & Jerk	125 kg	Standard				
Total	225 kg	Standard				
-62 kg
Snatch	125 kg	Hugo Catalán	December 2006			
Clean & Jerk	155 kg	Hugo Catalán	December 2006			
Total	280 kg	Hugo Catalán	December 2006			
-69 kg
Snatch	135 kg	Hugo Catalán	2008			
Clean & Jerk	166 kg	Hugo Catalán	31 October 2009			
Total	300 kg	Hugo Catalán	2008			
-77 kg
Snatch	151 kg	Carlos Espeleta				
Clean & Jerk	180 kg	Carlos Espeleta				
Total	331 kg	Carlos Espeleta				
-85 kg
Snatch	150 kg	D. Gontcharenko	24 November 2001			
Clean & Jerk	190 kg	Rafael Pennisi	23 September 2006			
Total	340 kg	Rafael Pennisi	23 September 2006			
-94 kg
Snatch	175 kg	Darío Lecman	1999			
Clean & Jerk	205 kg	Darío Lecman	1999			
Total	380 kg	Darío Lecman	1999			
-105 kg
Snatch	167 kg	Damián Abbiate	25 April 2009			
Clean & Jerk	203 kg	Damián Abbiate				
Total	367 kg	Damián Abbiate	25 April 2009			
+105 kg
Snatch	155 kg	Pedro Stetsiuk	13 October 2007			
Clean & Jerk	195 kg	Standard				
Total	349 kg	Yaser Viera				

=== Women (1998–2018) ===
Event	Record	Athlete	Date	Meet	Place	Ref
-48 kg
Snatch	72 kg	Malvina Veron	September 2006			
Clean & Jerk	90 kg	Malvina Veron	June 2007			
Total	161 kg	Malvina Veron	September 2006			
-53 kg
Snatch	80 kg	Malvina Veron	12 October 2008			
Clean & Jerk	97 kg	Malvina Veron	12 October 2008			
Total	177 kg	Malvina Veron	12 October 2008			
-58 kg
Snatch	90 kg	Mercedes Fernández	June 2004			
Clean & Jerk	110 kg	María Cecilia Floriddia	15 July 2007			
Total	200 kg	María Cecilia Floriddia	15 July 2007			
-63 kg
Snatch	94 kg	María Cecilia Floriddia	22 July 2006			
Clean & Jerk	113 kg	Johana Palacios	30 June 2016			
Total	203 kg	María Cecilia Floriddia	10 November 2007			
-69 kg
Snatch	106 kg	Valeria Fontan	25 April 2009			
Clean & Jerk	138 kg	Valeria Fontan	13 September 2008			
Total	243 kg	Valeria Fontan	25 April 2009			
-75 kg
Snatch	115 kg	Nora Köppel	13 November 2005	World Championships	Doha, Qatar	
Clean & Jerk	148 kg^{1}	Nora Köppel	13 May 2008	African Championships	Strand, South Africa	
Total	263 kg^{1}	Nora Köppel	13 May 2008	African Championships	Strand, South Africa	
-90 kg
Snatch	91 kg	Nora Köppel	25 July 2009			
Clean & Jerk	115 kg	Soledad Santillán	17 March 2018			
Total	204 kg	Soledad Santillán	17 March 2018			
+90 kg
Snatch	90 kg	Standard				
Clean & Jerk	110 kg	Standard				
Total	200 kg	Standard				

- ^1 Koppel was not part of the official competition as Argentina is not an African country and her results were not recorded by the IWF. It's unclear why and how Koppel competed there.
