= Athletics at the 2003 Pan American Games – Women's 10,000 metres =

Women's 10,000 metres at the Pan American Games

The Women's 10,000 metres event at the 2003 Pan American Games took place on Friday August 8, 2003. Mexico's Adriana Fernández won her second title after also having claimed the gold medal in the women's 5,000 metres.

== Medalists ==
Gold	Adriana Fernández; Mexico
Silver	Yudelkis Martínez; Cuba
Bronze	Bertha Sánchez; Colombia

== Records ==
World Record	Wang Junxia (CHN)	29:31.78	September 8, 1993	Beijing, PR China
Pan Am Record	Nora Rocha (MEX)	32:56.51	July 28, 1999	Winnipeg, Canada

== Results ==
Rank	Athlete	Time
1	Adriana Fernández (MEX)	33:16.05
2	Yudelkis Martínez (CUB)	33:55.12
3	Bertha Sánchez (COL)	33:56.17
4	Kimberly Fitchen-Young (USA)	34:15.09
5	Madaí Pérez (MEX)	34:27.71
6	Jennifer Crain (USA)	34:40.19
7	Elsa Monterroso (GUA)	36:24.23
8	Luz Silva (CHI)	37:11.17

== See also ==
- 2003 World Championships in Athletics – Women's 10,000 metres
- Athletics at the 2004 Summer Olympics – Women's 10000 metres
