= Weightlifting at the 2011 Pan American Games – Men's 85 kg =

Weightlifting – Men's 85 kg at the 2011 Pan American Games
- Venue: Weightlifting Forum
- Dates: October 25
- Competitors: 7 from 7 nations

Medalists
| Gold medal | Yoelmis Hernández | Cuba |
| Silver medal | Carlos Andica | Colombia |
| Bronze medal | Kendrick Farris | United States |

The men's 85 kg competition of the weightlifting events at the 2011 Pan American Games in Guadalajara, Mexico, was held on October 25 at the Weightlifting Forum. The defending champion was José Oliver Ruíz from Colombia.

Each lifter performed in both the snatch and clean and jerk lifts, with the final score being the sum of the lifter's best result in each. The athlete received three attempts in each of the two lifts; the score for the lift was the heaviest weight successfully lifted. This weightlifting event was the fifth lightest men's event at the weightlifting competition, limiting competitors to a maximum of 85 kilograms of body mass.

== Schedule ==
All times are Central Standard Time (UTC-6).

| Date | Time | Round |
|---|---|---|
| October 25, 2011 | 16:00 | Final |

== Results ==
7 athletes from 7 countries took part.

- PR – Pan American Games record

| Rank | Name | Country | Group | B.weight (kg) | Snatch (kg) | Clean & Jerk (kg) | Total (kg) |
|---|---|---|---|---|---|---|---|
| 1st place, gold medalist(s) | Yoelmis Hernández | Cuba | A | 82.98 | 158 | 205 | 363 |
| 2nd place, silver medalist(s) | Carlos Andica | Colombia | A | 84.79 | 157 | 205 PR | 362 |
| 3rd place, bronze medalist(s) | Kendrick Farris | United States | A | 84.77 | 157 | 191 | 348 |
| 4 | Julio Idrovo | Ecuador | A | 84.61 | 155 | 180 | 335 |
| 5 | Mathieu Marineau | Canada | A | 83.74 | 143 | 180 | 323 |
| 6 | Evaristo González | Dominican Republic | A | 83.67 | 145 | 175 | 320 |
| 7 | Odeus Belizer | Haiti | A | 84.25 | 145 | 165 | 310 |

== New records ==
The following records were established and improved upon during the competition.

| Clean & Jerk | 205.0 kg | Carlos Andica (COL) | PR |
