= Michel Batista =

Michel Batista may refer to:

- Michel Batista (wrestler) (born 1984), Cuban freestyle wrestler
- Michel Batista (weightlifter) (born 1977), Cuban weightlifter
