= Javier Díaz (swimmer) =

Mexican swimmer (born 1979)

Personal information
- Full name: Javier Díaz González
- National team: Mexico
- Born: 13 September 1979 (age 46) Saltillo, Mexico
- Height: 1.83 m (6 ft 0 in)
- Weight: 58 kg (128 lb)

Sport
- Sport: Swimming
- Strokes: Freestyle, medley
- College team: Purdue University (U.S.)

Javier Díaz González (born September 13, 1979) is a Mexican former swimmer, who specialized in freestyle and individual medley events. He is a two-time Olympian (2000 and 2004), and a former Mexican record holder in the 50, 100, and 200 m freestyle. Diaz also attended Purdue University in West Lafayette, Indiana, where he majored in economics, and played for the Purdue Boilermakers.

Diaz made his Olympic debut as a 21-year-old native from Mexico at the 2000 Summer Olympics in Sydney. He failed to reach the top 16 in any of his individual events, finishing thirtieth in the 200 m freestyle (1:53.30), and thirty-seventh in the 200 m individual medley (2:07.28).

At the 2004 Summer Olympics in Athens, Diaz teamed up with Joshua Ilika Brenner, Alejandro Siqueiros, and Leonardo Salinas Saldana in the men's 4 × 200 m freestyle relay. Swimming the third leg, Diaz recorded a split of 1:53.34, and the Mexicans rounded out an eight-team field to last place and fifteenth overall in a new national record of 7:29.54.

Shortly after his second Olympics, Diaz retired from swimming to work as a sports analyst for Televisa Deportes Network. He also became a network's swimming commentator for the 2011 Pan American Games in Guadalajara, and eventually, for the 2012 Summer Olympics in London.
