= Athletics at the 2003 Pan American Games – Women's shot put =

Women's shot put at the Pan American Games

The final of the Women's Shot Put event at the 2003 Pan American Games took place on Thursday August 7, 2003. Cuba's winner, Yumileidi Cumbá, was the only woman to cross the 19-metres barrier.

== Medalists ==
Gold	Yumileidi Cumbá; Cuba
Silver	Elisângela Adriano; Brazil
Bronze	Fior Vásquez; Dominican Republic

== Records ==
World Record	Natalya Lisovskaya (URS)	22.63 m	June 7, 1987	Moscow, Soviet Union
Pan Am Record	María Elena Sarría (CUB)	19.34 m	August 28, 1983	Caracas, Venezuela

== Results ==
Rank	Athlete	Attempts						Result
Rank	Athlete	1	2	3	4	5	6	Result
1	Yumileidi Cumbá (CUB)	18.30	19.14	18.98	X	18.96	19.31	19.31 m
2	Elisângela Adriano (BRA)	18.48	X	18.27	X	X	X	18.48 m
3	Fior Vásquez (DOM)	17.73	17.76	18.00	16.63	15.76	18.14	18.14 m
4	Misleydis González (CUB)	17.90	X	17.99	X	17.75	17.52	17.99 m
5	Laura Gerraughty (USA)	17.24	17.09	X	X	17.33	X	17.33 m
6	Cleopatra Borel (TRI)	16.18	17.23	17.11	X	X	X	17.23 m
7	Kristin Heaston (USA)	15.94	16.55	16.30	X	X	X	16.55 m
8	Marianne Berndt (CHI)	15.16	X	15.37	X	X	X	15.37 m
9	Luz Dary Castro (COL)	X	14.92	14.67				14.92 m

== See also ==
- 2003 Shot Put Year Ranking
- 2003 World Championships in Athletics – Women's shot put
- Athletics at the 2004 Summer Olympics – Women's shot put
