= Athletics at the 2003 Pan American Games – Women's 5000 metres =

Women's 5000 metres at the Pan American Games

The Women's 5,000 metres event at the 2003 Pan American Games took place on Wednesday August 6, 2003. For the third time in a row the title went to Mexico's Adriana Fernández. She set a new Pan Am record in the final, beating her own record (15:46.32) established in 1995 (Mar del Plata).

== Medalists ==
Gold	Adriana Fernández; Mexico
Silver	Nora Rocha; Mexico
Bronze	Nicole Jefferson; United States

== Records ==
World Record	Jiang Bo (CHN)	14:28.09	October 23, 1997	Shanghai, PR China
Pan Am Record	Adriana Fernández (MEX)	15:46.32	March 24, 1995	Mar del Plata, Argentina

== Results ==
Rank	Athlete	Time
1	Adriana Fernández (MEX)	15:30.65
2	Nora Rocha (MEX)	15:40.98
3	Nicole Jefferson (USA)	15:42.40
4	Yudelkis Martínez (CUB)	16:09.33
5	Bertha Sánchez (COL)	16:13.59
6	Ann Marie Brooks (USA)	16:31.51
7	Rosa Apaza (BOL)	17:01.41
8	Elsa Monterroso (GUA)	17:13.72
9	Silvia Paredes (ECU)	17:46.03

== See also ==
- 2003 World Championships in Athletics – Women's 5000 metres
- Athletics at the 2004 Summer Olympics – Women's 5000 metres
