= Athletics at the 2003 Pan American Games – Men's discus throw =

Men's discus throw at the Pan American Games

The final of the Men's Discus Throw event at the 2003 Pan American Games took place on Friday August 8, 2003. Jason Tunks won the first discus gold for Canada in the history of the Pan American Games.

== Medalists ==
Gold	Jason Tunks; Canada
Silver	Frank Casañas; Cuba
Bronze	Lois Maikel Martínez; Cuba

== Records ==
World Record	Jürgen Schult (GDR)	74.08 m	June 6, 1986	Neubrandenburg, East Germany
Pan Am Record	Luis Delís (CUB)	67.32 m	August 25, 1983	Caracas, Venezuela

== Results ==
Rank	Athlete	Throws						Final
Rank	Athlete	1	2	3	4	5	6	Result
1	Jason Tunks (CAN)	63.70	63.14	62.12	61.93	61.68	63.67	63.70 m
2	Frank Casañas (CUB)	60.21	60.04	61.32	62.52	62.61	X	62.61 m
3	Lois Maikel Martínez (CUB)	60.78	60.12	X	60.33	61.36	60.10	61.36 m
4	Josh Ralston (USA)	54.14	56.48	X	X	59.57	X	59.57 m
5	Jorge Balliengo (ARG)	X	53.43	59.39	X	—	X	59.39 m
6	Doug Reynolds (USA)	X	56.10	58.49	58.60	58.39	—	58.60 m
7	Eric Forshaw (CAN)	56.74	56.27	57.42	56.84	55.49	X	57.42 m
8	Marcelo Pugliese (ARG)	55.39	55.13	X	55.88	55.18	X	55.88 m
9	Expedi Peña (DOM)	48.39	48.09	51.33				51.33 m
10	Alleyne Lett (GRN)	X	47.22	40.84				47.22 m

== See also ==
- 2003 World Championships in Athletics – Men's discus throw
- Athletics at the 2004 Summer Olympics – Men's discus throw
