= Guillermina Candelario =

Dominican Republic weightlifter

Personal information
- Born: 1973 (age 52–53)
Medal record
Women's Weightlifting
Representing the Dominican Republic
Pan American Games
Silver medal – second place	2003 Santo Domingo	– 48 kg
Bronze medal – third place	1999 Winnipeg	– 48 kg
Bronze medal – third place	2007 Rio de Janeiro	– 48 kg
Pan American Championships
Bronze medal – third place	2006 Guatemala City	– 48 kg
Bronze medal – third place	2010 Guatemala City	– 48 kg
Central American and Caribbean Games
Silver medal – second place	2010 Mayagüez	– 48 kg
Bronze medal – third place	2006 Cartagena	– 48 kg

Guillermina Candelario (born August 19, 1979) is a weightlifter from the Dominican Republic. She won three medals during her career at the Pan American Games (1999, 2003 and 2007) in the women's flyweight division (– 48 kg).

Guillermina win the bronze medal at the 2006 Pan American Weightlifting Championships in the under 48 kg category.
