= Christian López (weightlifter) =

Guatemalan weightlifter (1984–2013)

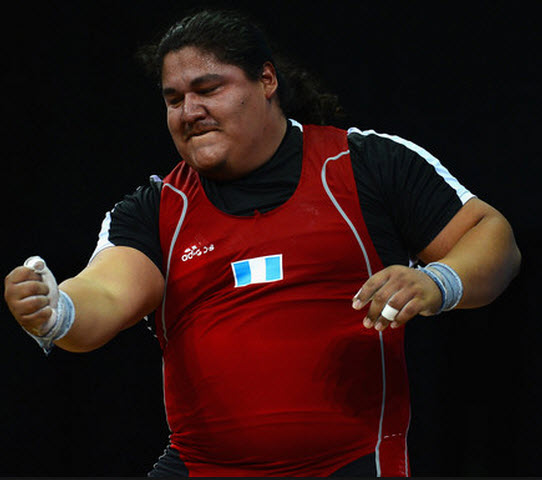

Personal information
- Nationality: Guatemala
- Born: 30 March 1984 Coatepeque, Quetzaltenango, Guatemala
- Died: 6 November 2013 (aged 29) Coatepeque, Quetzaltenango, Guatemala
- Height: 175 cm (5.74 ft)
- Weight: 139 kg (306 lb)

Sport
- Sport: Weightlifting
- Event: +105 kg

Achievements and titles
- Olympic finals: 2008, 2012
Medal record
Men's Weightlifting
Representing Guatemala
Central American and Caribbean Games
| Gold medal – first place | 2010 Mayagüez | +105 kg Snatch |
| Bronze medal – third place | 2010 Mayagüez | +105 kg Total |
- Updated on 17 September 2012

Christian Alberto López Bobadilla (30 March 1984 – 6 November 2013) was a Guatemalan weightlifter. He competed in the -105kg event at the 2008 Summer Olympics and the +105 kg at the 2012 Summer Olympics. At the 2010 Central American and Caribbean Games, López won a gold medal in the +105 kg snatch and a bronze in the +105 kg combined.

López died on 6 November 2013 from pneumonia.
