= Weightlifting at the 2010 South American Games – Women's +75kg =

The Women's +75 kg event at the 2010 South American Games was held over March 29 at 16:00.

== Medalists ==
Gold	Silver	Bronze
Oliba Nieve; Ecuador	Yaniuska Espinosa; Venezuela	Elizabeth Cortéz; Chile

== Results ==
Rank	Athlete	Bodyweight	Snatch			Clean & Jerk			Total
Rank	Athlete	Bodyweight	1	2	3	1	2	3	Total
1st place, gold medalist(s)	Oliba Nieve (ECU)	91.49	105	110	~~118~~	135	140	~~148~~	250
2nd place, silver medalist(s)	Yaniuska Espinosa (VEN)	110.28	101	106	~~112~~	126	134	~~137~~	240
3rd place, bronze medalist(s)	Elizabeth Cortéz (CHI)	129.72	82	90	~~100~~	~~115~~	115	–	205
4	Mayara Gomes (BRA)	117.14	~~80~~	80	~~85~~	~~100~~	100	105	185
