= Jenny Crain =

American retired runner

Personal information
- Born: February 12, 1968 (age 57) Milwaukee, Wisconsin, United States

Sport
- Sport: Track and field

Jenny Crain (born February 12, 1968, in Milwaukee, Wisconsin) is an American retired runner. She competed in the USA Outdoor Track and Field Championship in distances from 3000 meters to the marathon and in the U.S. Olympic Trials at 5,000m, 10,000m and marathon distances.

On August 21, 2007, while on a training run for her fourth Olympic Marathon Trials, an automobile driver hit Crain. She suffered a myriad of injuries including extensive brain damage, ending her competitive running career and starting a lifetime of rehabilitation.

== Running career ==
Jenny Crain followed her brother, Peter, into competitive running in at Franklin High School in Franklin, Wisconsin. She continued her running at Ohio University where she earned All-MAC honors.

After college, Crain put running on hold while pursuing a different professional career until deciding to train for and compete in the 1996 Olympic Trials.

== Traffic collision and rehab ==
On August 21, 2007, while on a training run for her fourth Olympic Marathon trials, a driver hit Crain while she was crossing the intersection at Brady and Farwell streets in her hometown of Milwaukee.

The collision fractured Crain's vertebrae, shattered her jaw, bruised her aorta, and caused massive brain damage. The traumatic brain injury resulted in a loss of spatial awareness, reading ability limitations, short-term memory impairment, difficulty walking, and balance problems. Crain's treatment included acute hospital care at Froedert Hospital, specialized critical care for brain injury at Milwaukee's Sacred Heart Rehabilitation Institute, and continual therapy for over 1.5 years at Mt. Carmel. As of 2009, Crain required assisted living in her condo, and was involved in daily therapy sessions.

A number of initiatives were launched in response to Crain's accident:

- Jenny Crain Make It Happen Benefit fund to help pay for ongoing medical expenses.
- The Milwaukee community has hosted a variety of benefits including auctions, Make It Happen wrist bands, races, the Make it Happen Mile, and set the Guinness World Record for "most people linked together to complete a marathon" with 62 roped-together runners, competing as Team Jennipede at Milwaukee's 2011 Lakefront Marathon.
- "The Runner's Cookbook, Winning Recipes from Some of the World's Best Athletes." Half of the proceeds from the sale of this cookbook went to the Jenny Crain Make It Happen Fund.
- USA Track & Field started a Jenny Crain Mentoring Program which helps maximize opportunities and resources for developing athletes.

== Results ==
Year	Event	Place	Time
2005	Mt. Sac Relays 10000	3rd	33:05
2005	USA 10000 Championships	7th	33:07.43
2005	USA 15 km Championships	6th	51:21 (PR)
2005	USA 8 km Championships	5th	26:24
2004	USA Olympic Trials - 10000	10th	33:19
2004	USA 20 km Championships	3rd	1:10:58 (PR)
2004	USA 10 km Championships	5th	33:28
2004	USA Olympic Trials - Marathon	11th	2:37:36 (PR)
2004	ING NYC Marathon	15th	2:41:06
2003	USA Championships 10000m	5th	32:49
2003	Pan American Games 10000	6th	34:40.19
2003	USA 10 km Championships	3rd	33:16
2003	ING NYC Marathon	16th	2:38:49
2001	Eugene Twilight Meet 5000m	3rd	15:36
2000	USA Olympic Trials - 5000m	14th	15:49
2000	USA Olympic Trials - 10000m	10th	32:42
2000	USA Olympic Trials - Marathon	14th	2:42:12
1999	Pan-Am Games Marathon	7th	2:54:19
1999	USA Outdoors 10000	19th	34:13:43
1998	Columbus Marathon	2nd	2:40:31 (PR)
1998	USA Outdoors 10000	5th	34:33.59
1998	Stanford Invitational 5000	1st	16:01.45 (PR)
1998	Mt SAC 10000	1st	32:30.01 (PR)
1998	Charlotte Observer Marathon	1st	2:45:26
1997	IAAF World Half Marathon Championships	53rd	1:15.05 (PR)
1997	California International Marathon	9th	2:46:57
1997	USA 10 Mile Champs	8th	56:52
1997	USA 5K Road Champs	12th	
1997	USA Outdoor 10000	9th	33:59.03
1997	USA Indoor 3000	7th	9:25:08 (PR)
1996	Chicago Marathon	11th	2:44:21
1996	Drake Relays	2nd	34:11.26
1996	Sea-Ray Relays	2nd	34:35.97
1996	USA Olympic Marathon Trials	84th	2:52:47
1995	Tucson Marathon	1st	2:50:01
