= Athletics at the 2003 Pan American Games – Men's 10,000 metres =

Men's 10,000 metres at the Pan American Games

The Men's 10,000 metres event at the 2003 Pan American Games took place on Thursday August 7, 2003.

== Medalists ==
| Gold | Teodoro Vega; Mexico |
| Silver | Marílson dos Santos; Brazil |
| Bronze | Dan Browne; United States |

== Records ==
| World Record | Haile Gebrselassie (ETH) | 26:22.75 | June 1, 1998 | Hengelo, Netherlands |
| Pan Am Record | Bruce Bickford (USA) | 28:20.37 | August 13, 1987 | Indianapolis, United States |

== Results ==
| Rank | Athlete | Time |
|---|---|---|
| 1 | Teodoro Vega (MEX) | 28:49.38 |
| 2 | Marílson dos Santos (BRA) | 28:49.48 |
| 3 | Dan Browne (USA) | 29:06.23 |
| 4 | Pablo Olmedo (MEX) | 29:41.31 |
| 5 | Luis Fonseca (VEN) | 29:42.30 |
| 6 | William Naranjo (COL) | 30:13.26 |
| 7 | José Amado García (GUA) | 30:26.61 |
| 8 | Jorge Cabrera (PAR) | 31:40.79 |
| — | Weldon Johnson (USA) | DNF |
| — | Mauricio Díaz (CHI) | DNS |

== See also ==
- 2003 World Championships in Athletics – Men's 10,000 metres
- Athletics at the 2004 Summer Olympics – Men's 10000 metres
