= Yudelkis Martínez =

Cuban long-distance runner

Personal information
- Full name: Yudelkis Martínez Genaro
- Born: September 11, 1979 (age 46)

Sport
- Country: Cuba
- Sport: Athletics
Medal record
Women's Athletics
Representing Cuba
Pan American Games
| Silver medal – second place | 2003 Santo Domingo | 10,000 metres |
CAC Championships
| Gold medal – first place | 2003 St George's | 10,000 metres |
| Gold medal – first place | 2005 Nassau | 5,000 metres |
| Gold medal – first place | 2005 Nassau | 10,000 metres |

Yudelkis Martínez Genaro (born September 11, 1979) is a female long-distance runner from Cuba. She represented her native country at the 2003 Pan American Games in Santo Domingo, Dominican Republic, where she won the silver medal in the women's 10,000 metres event behind Mexico's Adriana Fernández.

== Competition record ==
| Year | Competition | Venue | Position | Event | Notes |
Representing Cuba
| 1997 | Pan American Junior Championships | Havana, Cuba | 7th | 3000 m | 10:20.82 min |
| 2003 | Central American and Caribbean Championships | St. George's, Grenada | 1st | 10,000 m | 34:29.05 min |
| 2003 | Pan American Games | Santo Domingo, Dominican Republic | 4th | 5000 m | 16:09.33 min |
| 2003 | Pan American Games | Santo Domingo, Dominican Republic | 2nd | 10,000 m | 33:55.12 min |
| 2005 | ALBA Games | La Habana, Cuba | 1st | 5000 m | 16:24.82 min |
| 2005 | ALBA Games | La Habana, Cuba | 1st | 10,000 m | 34:55.3 min |
| 2005 | Central American and Caribbean Championships | Nassau, Bahamas | 1st | 5000 m | 17:12.58 min |
| 2005 | Central American and Caribbean Championships | Nassau, Bahamas | 1st | 10,000 m | 34:53.50 min |
