= Athletics at the 2007 Pan American Games – Women's 5000 metres =

Women's 5000 metres at the 2007 Pan American Games
- Venue: Estádio Olímpico João Havelange
- Date: 27 July 2007

Medalists
Gold medal	Megan Metcalfe	Canada
Silver medal	Catherine Ferrell	United States
Bronze medal	Nora Rocha	Mexico

The women's 5000 metres event at the 2007 Pan American Games was held on 27 July 2007.

== Results ==
Rank	Name	Nationality	Time	Notes
1st place, gold medalist(s)	Megan Metcalfe	Canada	15:35.78	
2nd place, silver medalist(s)	Catherine Ferrell	United States	15:42.01	PB
3rd place, bronze medalist(s)	Nora Rocha	Mexico	15:43.80	
4	Dulce María Rodríguez	Mexico	15:46.89	SB
5	Lucelia Peres	Brazil	15:47.61	PB
6	Bertha Sánchez	Colombia	15:49.97	PB
7	Ednalva da Silva	Brazil	15:55.46	PB
8	Mandi Zemba	United States	16:08.09	
9	Wilma Arizapana	Peru	16:39.90	
10	Faustina Huamani	Peru	16:53.82	
	Yailen García	Cuba	DNS	
