= Athletics at the 2003 Pan American Games – Men's javelin throw =

Men's javelin throw at the Pan American Games

The final of the Men's Javelin Throw event at the 2003 Pan American Games took place on Wednesday August 6, 2003. Cuba's Emeterio González set a new PanAm record, with a distance of 81.72 metres. He won the title for the third time in a row.

== Medalists ==
Gold	Emeterio González; Cuba
Silver	Isbel Luaces; Cuba
Bronze	Breaux Greer; United States

== Records ==
World Record	Jan Železný (CZE)	98.48 m	May 25, 1996	Jena, Germany
Pan Am Record	Emeterio González (CUB)	79.28 m	March 21, 1995	Mar del Plata, Argentina

== Results ==
Rank	Athlete	Throws						Final
Rank	Athlete	1	2	3	4	5	6	Result
1	Emeterio González (CUB)	80.27	X	78.89	X	79.43	81.72	81.72 m
2	Isbel Luaces (CUB)	79.11	77.22	77.71	80.95	X	79.88	80.95 m
3	Breaux Greer (USA)	77.83	X	X	X	77.74	79.21	79.21 m
4	Luiz Fernando da Silva (BRA)	73.27	73.00	72.12	73.13	68.83	73.86	73.86 m
5	Manuel Fuenmayor (VEN)	66.88	72.63	X	69.03	68.82	71.69	72.63 m
6	Nery Kennedy (PAR)	68.04	X	71.12	72.62	71.67	67.89	72.62 m
7	Diego Moraga (CHI)	67.43	68.12	69.25	71.79	68.77	71.78	71.79 m
8	Rob Minnitti (USA)	67.24	71.64	68.52	X	71.04	70.72	71.64 m
9	Noraldo Palacios (COL)	68.31	64.02	69.09				69.09 m
10	Rigoberto Calderón (NCA)	66.98	63.59	X				66.98 m

== See also ==
- 2003 World Championships in Athletics – Men's javelin throw
- Athletics at the 2004 Summer Olympics – Men's javelin throw
