= Dr. Juan Sanchez Acevedo Coliseum =

Sports arena in Moca, Puerto Rico

- Location: Moca, Puerto Rico
- Capacity: 3,000

Dr. Juan Sanchez Acevedo Coliseum is an arena in Moca, Puerto Rico. It hosted the weightlifting events for the 2010 Central American and Caribbean Games.
