= Fior Vásquez =

Dominican Republic athlete

Personal information
- Born: December 27, 1977 (age 48)

Sport
- Sport: Track and field
Medal record
Representing Dominican Republic
Pan American Games
Bronze medal – third place	2003 Santo Domingo	Shot put
Central American and Caribbean Games
Gold medal – first place	2002 San Salvador	Shot put

Fior Vásquez (born December 27, 1977) is a female shot putter from the Dominican Republic. Her first name is sometimes also spelled as Flor.

== Career ==
Vásquez is best known for winning the bronze medal at the 2003 Pan American Games in Santo Domingo, where she set a new national record in her sixth and final attempt (18.14 metres). She also represented her native country at the 2004 Summer Olympics in Athens, Greece, finishing in 14th place in the qualifying round of the women's shot put event.

== Achievements ==
- All results regarding shot put, unless stated otherwise

Year	Competition	Venue	Position	Event	Notes
Representing the Dominican Republic
2002	Ibero-American Championships	Guatemala City, Guatemala	4th	Shot put	15.78 m
2002	Central American and Caribbean Games	San Salvador, El Salvador	1st	Shot put	17.04 m
2002	Central American and Caribbean Games	San Salvador, El Salvador	4th	Discus	39.98 m
2003	Pan American Games	Santo Domingo, Dominican Republic	3rd	Shot put	18.14 m
2004	Ibero-American Championships	Huelva, Spain	4th	Shot put	17.05 m
2004	Olympic Games	Athens, Greece	14th (q)	Shot put	17.99 m
