= Lely Burgos =

Puerto Rican weightlifter (born 1985)

Personal information
- Full name: Lely Berlitt Burgos Ortiz
- Nationality: Puerto Rico
- Born: 6 June 1985 (age 41) Ponce, Puerto Rico
- Education: Pontificia Universidad Católica de Puerto Rico
- Height: 1.53 m (5 ft 0 in)
- Weight: 48 kg (106 lb)

Sport
- Sport: Weightlifting
- Event: -48 kg
Medal record
Women's Weightlifting
Representing Puerto Rico
Central American and Caribbean Games
Silver medal – second place	2010 Mayagüez	-48 kg Total
Silver medal – second place	2010 Mayagüez	-48 kg C&J
Bronze medal – third place	2010 Mayagüez	-48 kg Snatch
Pan American Games
Gold medal – first place	2011 Guadalajara	-48 kg Total
- Updated on 17 September 2012

Lely Berlitt Burgos Ortiz (born June 6, 1985) is a Puerto Rican weightlifter. She competed at the 2012 Summer Olympics in the Women's 48 kg, finishing in 11th place.
