= Jairo Cossio =

Colombian weightlifter (born 1970)

Personal information
- Born: 3 July 1970 (age 55)
Medal record
Men's Weightlifting
Representing Colombia
Pan American Games
| Bronze medal – third place | 2003 Santo Domingo | – 94 kg |
Central American and Caribbean Games
| Silver medal – second place | 2006 Cartagena | – 94 kg |

Jairo Anibal Cossio Zapata (born 3 July 1970, in Antioquia) is a retired male weightlifter from Colombia. He won a bronze medal for his native South American country at the 2003 Pan American Games.
