= Nelson Castro (weightlifter) =

Colombian weightlifter (born 1974)

Personal information
- Born: March 29, 1974 (age 52)
Medal record
Men's Weightlifting
Representing Colombia
Pan American Games
Gold medal – first place	2003 Santo Domingo	– 56 kg
Silver medal – second place	1999 Winnipeg	– 56 kg
Central American and Caribbean Games
Bronze medal – third place	2006 Cartagena	– 56 kg

Nelson Castro Velásquez (born March 29, 1974, in Roldanillo, Valle del Cauca) is a retired weightlifter from Colombia, who competed for his native country at three consecutive Summer Olympics, starting in 1996. He twice won a medal at the Pan American Games in the Men's Flyweight (– 56 kg) division.
