= Rigoberto Trujillo =

Cuban judoka (born 1978)

Personal information
- Born: December 21, 1978 (age 47)
Medal record
Men's Judo
Representing Cuba
Pan American Games
Bronze medal – third place	2003 Santo Domingo	Heavyweight

Rigoberto Trujillo (born December 21, 1978) is a retired judoka from Cuba. He won the bronze medal in the men's heavyweight (+ 100 kg) division at the 2003 Pan American Games, alongside USA's Martin Boonzaayer. He also finished 7th at the Tournoi de Paris judo in 2001
