= Carmenza Delgado =

Colombian weightlifter (born 1972)

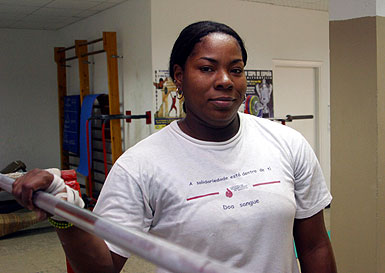
- 2006

Personal information
- Full name: Carmenza Delgado Castillo
- Born: May 5, 1972 (age 54) Cartago, Valle del Cauca
Medal record
Women's Weightlifting
Representing Colombia
Pan American Games
Gold medal – first place	2003 Santo Domingo	+ 75 kg
Bronze medal – third place	1999 Winnipeg	+ 75 kg
Central American and Caribbean Games
Gold medal – first place	2006 Cartagena	+ 75 kg

Carmenza Delgado Castillo (born May 5, 1972, in Cartago, Valle del Cauca) is a retired weightlifter from Colombia. She twice competed for her native South American country at the Summer Olympics (2000 and 2004), finishing in fourth and ninth place. Delgado twice won a medal in the women's super-heavyweight division (+ 75 kg) at the Pan American Games.

Olympic Games
Preceded by María Urrutia	Flagbearer for Colombia; Athens 2004	Succeeded by María Luisa Calle
