= Teodoro Vega =

Mexican long-distance runner

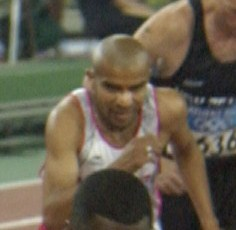
- Vega at 2004 Summer Olympics

Personal information
- Born: 14 July 1976 (age 50) Toluca, Mexico

Sport
- Sport: Track and field
Medal record
Representing Mexico
Pan American Games
| Gold medal – first place | 2003 Santo Domingo | 10,000m |
Central American and Caribbean Games
| Silver medal – second place | 2002 San Salvador | 10,000m |

Teodoro Vega Morales (born 14 July 1976) is a Mexican retired long-distance runner who specializes in the 10,000 metres.

== Achievements ==
| Year | Competition | Venue | Position | Event | Notes |
|---|---|---|---|---|---|
| 2001 | Central American and Caribbean Championships | Guatemala City, Guatemala | 1st | 5,000 m | |
| 2001 | World Championships | Edmonton, Canada | 17th | 10,000 m | |
| 2002 | Central American and Caribbean Games | San Salvador, El Salvador | 2nd | 10,000 m | 28:42.86 |
| 2003 | Pan American Games | Santo Domingo, Dom. Rep. | 1st | 10,000 m | |
| 2003 | World Championships | Paris, France | 15th | 10,000 m | |
| 2004 | Olympic Games | Athens, Greece | 20th | 10,000 m | |
| 2009 | Central American and Caribbean Championships | Havana, Cuba | 2nd | 5,000 m | |
| 2009 | Central American and Caribbean Championships | Havana, Cuba | 3rd | 10,000 m | |

=== Personal bests ===
- 3000 metres - 7:58.28 min (2003)
- 5000 metres - 13:22.40 min (2003)
- 10,000 metres - 27:37.49 min (2003)
