= Mabel Mosquera =

Colombian weightlifter (born 1969)

Personal information
- Born: July 1, 1969 (age 56) Quibdó
Medal record
Representing Colombia
Women's Weightlifting
Olympic Games
| Bronze medal – third place | 2004 Athens | – 53 kg |
Pan American Games
| Gold medal – first place | 2003 Santo Domingo | – 53 kg |

Mabel Mosquera Mena (born July 1, 1969) is a weightlifter from Quibdó, Colombia.

Born in Quibdó, Chocó, she started weightlifting in 1999.

She competed in the women's 53 kg weight class at the 2004 Summer Olympics. Lifting 197.5 kg in total, she won the bronze medal in Athens, Greece.
