= Lois Maikel Martínez =

Cuban discus thrower (born 1981)

Personal information
- Full name: Lois Maikel Martínez González
- Born: 3 June 1981 (age 45) Havana, Cuba
- Height: 1.85 m (6 ft 1 in)
- Weight: 122 kg (269 lb)

Sport
- Country: Spain
- Sport: Athletics
- Club: Playas de Castellón
- Coached by: Antonio Simarro
Medal record
Men's Athletics
Representing Cuba
CAC Junior Championships (U17)
Gold medal – first place	1996 San Salvador	Discus throw
- Updated on 23 May 2013

Lois Maikel Martínez González (born 3 June 1981 in Havana) is a male discus thrower from Cuba. In 2015, he changed his allegiance to Spain. His personal best throw is 67.45 metres, achieved in July 2005 in Havana.

== Career ==
He finished sixth at the 2002 World Junior Championships. He also competed at the 2003 World Championships and the 2004 Olympic Games without qualifying for the final round. On the regional level he won the bronze medal at the 2003 Pan American Games and the silver medal at the 2005 Central American and Caribbean Championships. He became Cuban champion in 2002 and 2006, having a rivalry with Alexis Elizalde and Frank Casañas.

== Achievements ==
Year	Competition	Venue	Position	Event	Notes
Representing Cuba
1996	Central American and Caribbean; Junior Championships (U-17)	San Salvador, El Salvador	5th	Shot put (5 kg)	13.41 m
1996	Central American and Caribbean; Junior Championships (U-17)	San Salvador, El Salvador	1st	Discus throw (1.5 kg)	47.58 m
1998	World Junior Championships	Annecy, France	12th (q)	Discus throw	47.59 m
2000	World Junior Championships	Santiago de Chile, Chile	6th	Discus throw	56.94 m
2003	Pan American Games	Santo Domingo, Dominican Republic	3rd	Discus throw	61.36 m
2003	World Championships	Paris, France	12th (q)	Discus throw	57.87 m
2004	Ibero-American Championships	Huelva, Spain	2nd	Discus throw	62.08 m
2004	Olympic Games	Athens, Greece	29th	Discus throw	57.18 m
2005	ALBA Games	La Habana, Cuba	1st	Discus throw	61.31 m
2005	Central American and Caribbean Championships	Nassau, Bahamas	2nd	Discus throw	59.35 m
Representing Spain
2015	World Championships	Beijing, China	28th (q)	Discus throw	58.01 m
2016	European Championships	Amsterdam, Netherlands	12th	Discus throw	59.27 m
2016	Olympic Games	Rio de Janeiro, Brazil	27th (q)	Discus throw	59.42 m
2018	Mediterranean Games	Tarragona, Spain	5th	Discus throw	58.61 m
2018	European Championships	Berlin, Germany	24th (q)	Discus throw	54.56 m
2021	Olympic Games	Tokyo, Japan	30th (q)	Discus throw	54.69 m
2022	Ibero-American Championships	La Nucía, Spain	4th	Discus throw	56.35 m

== Other sources ==
- Así lleva el confinamiento Lois Maikel en somosatletismo.com
- Evans, Hilary; Gjerde, Arild; Heijmans, Jeroen; Mallon, Bill; et al. "Lois Maikel Martínez". Olympics at Sports-Reference.com. Sports Reference LLC. Archived from the original on 18 April 2020.
- López Dot, Jordi (7 July 2010), MITING CIUTAT DE MATARO-CAMPIONAT DE CATALUNYA ABSOLUT OPEN/Lois Maikel Martinez 675A0794.JPG (in Catalan), Federació Catalana d'Atletisme, archived from the original on 12 August 2010
