= Ariadna Capiró =

Cuban basketball player

Personal information
- Full name: Ariadna Capiró Felipe
- Born: February 4, 1983 (age 43) Havana, Cuba
Medal record
Women's basketball
Representing Cuba
Pan American Games
Gold medal – first place	2003 Santo Domingo	Team

Ariadna Capiró Felipe (born February 4, 1983) is a women's basketball player from Cuba. Playing as a guard she won the gold medal with the Cuba women's national basketball team at the 2003 Pan American Games in Santo Domingo, Dominican Republic.
