= Wanda Rijo =

Dominican Republic weightlifter

Personal information
- National team: Dominican Republic
- Born: November 26, 1979 (age 46) San Pedro de Macoris
- Weight: 74 kg (163 lb)

Sport
- Country: Dominican Republic
- Sport: Weightlifting
Medal record
Representing the Dominican Republic
Pan American Games
Gold medal – first place	1999 Winnipeg	– 75 kg
Gold medal – first place	2003 Santo Domingo	– 75 kg

Wanda Rijo Contreras (born November 26, 1979) is a female former weightlifter from the Dominican Republic. She twice competed at the Summer Olympics: 2000 and 2004. Rijo won the only gold medal for the Dominican Republic at the 1999 Pan American Games in Winnipeg, Manitoba, Canada. A year later she carried the flag for her native country at the opening ceremony of the 2000 Summer Olympics in Sydney, Australia.

She is currently a pastor at Monte de Dios, La Romana. She was inducted to the Dominican Republic Hall of Fame in 2016.

Olympic Games
Preceded by Joan Guzmán	Flagbearer for Dominican Republic; Sydney 2000	Succeeded by Francia Jackson
