= Solenny Villasmil =

Venezuelan weightlifter (born 1981)

Personal information
- Full name: Solenny Bolivia Villasmil
- Nationality: Venezuela
- Born: 12 May 1981 (age 45)
- Height: 1.62 m (5 ft 4 in)
- Weight: 63 kg (139 lb)

Sport
- Sport: Weightlifting
- Event: 63 kg
Medal record
Representing Venezuela
Pan American Games
| Silver medal – second place | 2003 Santo Domingo | -63kg |

Solenny Bolivia Villasmil (born May 12, 1981) is a Venezuelan weightlifter. Villasmil represented Venezuela at the 2008 Summer Olympics in Beijing, where she competed for the women's middleweight category (63 kg). Villasmil placed thirteenth in this event, as she successfully lifted 90 kg in the single-motion snatch, and hoisted 115 kg in the two-part, shoulder-to-overhead clean and jerk, for a total of 205 kg.
