= Carlos Saurí =

Puerto Rican weightlifter

Personal information
- Nationality: Puerto Rican
- Born: 21 June 1974 (age 51)

Sport
- Sport: Weightlifting

Carlos Saurí (born 21 June 1974) is a Puerto Rican weightlifter. He competed in the men's middleweight event at the 2000 Summer Olympics.
