= Ana Margot Lemos =

Colombian weightlifter (born 1986)

Personal information
- Born: April 24, 1986 (age 40)
Medal record
Women's Weightlifting
Representing Colombia
Pan American Games
Silver medal – second place	2007 Rio de Janeiro	– 53 kg
Pan American Championships
Silver medal – second place	2008 Callao	– 53 kg
Central American and Caribbean Games
Gold medal – first place	2006 Cartagena	– 53 kg

Ana Margot Lemos (born April 24, 1986) is a female weightlifter from Colombia. She won a silver medal at the 2007 Pan American Games for her native South American country.
