= Nora Köppel =

Argentine weightlifter (born 1972)

Nora Koppel
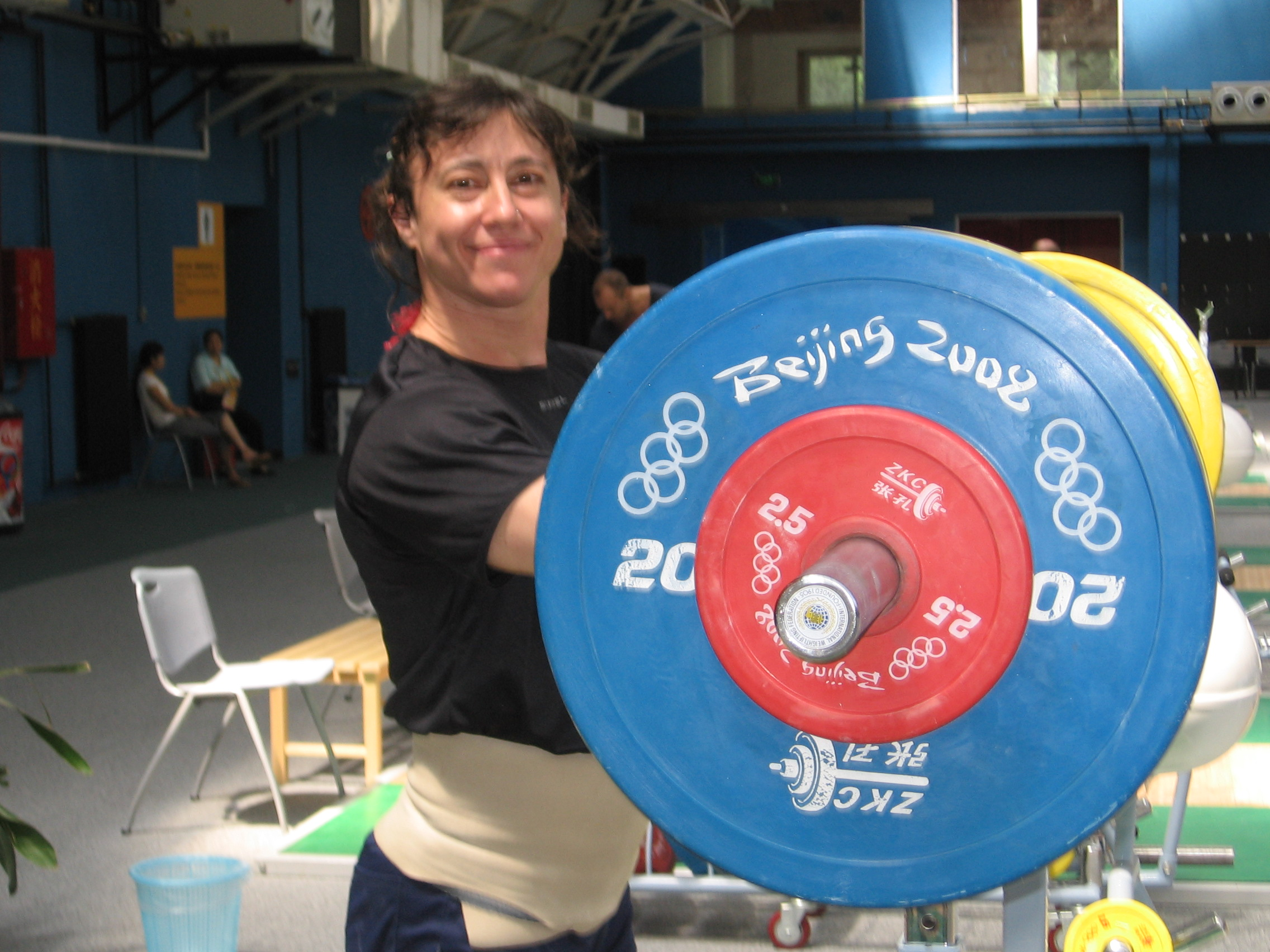

Personal information
- Born: 19 May 1972 (age 54) San Miguel de Tucumán, Argentina
- Height: 1.75 m (5 ft 9 in)

Sport
- Country: Argentina
Medal record
Representing Argentina
Pan American Games
Silver medal – second place	2003 Santo Domingo	-75kg

Nora Edith Koppel (born 19 May 1972 in San Miguel de Tucumán, Tucumán) is an Argentine Olympic weightlifter. She has represented her country at the 2000, 2004 and 2008 Olympics. She is Jewish.

She has had a varied athletic career, beginning when she started gymnastics at the age of 15. Koppel competed on the Argentine National Gymnastics Team. In her twenties, she became a weightlifter.

In her three Olympic appearance, she earned her highest total in 2004, when she successfully completed a 220-lb snatch and 302.5-lb clean and jerk in the 165-lb category. Before competing in the 2004 Games in Athens, she held the Pan-American record with a 572-lb total.
