= Isbel Luaces =

Cuban javelin thrower (born 1975)

Personal information
- Full name: Isbel Luaces McKullock
- Born: July 20, 1975 (age 50) Camagüey, Camagüey
- Height: 1.87 m (6 ft 2 in)
- Weight: 97 kg (214 lb)

Sport
- Country: Cuba
- Sport: Athletics
Medal record
Men's Athletics
Representing Cuba
Pan American Games
Silver medal – second place	2003 Santo Domingo	Javelin throw
Central American and Caribbean Games
Silver medal – second place	1998 Maracaibo	Javelin throw
Summer Universiade
Silver medal – second place	2001 Beijing	Javelin throw
Bronze medal – third place	1999 Palma de Mallorca	Javelin throw
World Junior Championships
Bronze medal – third place	1994 Lisbon	Javelin throw
CAC Junior Championships (U17)
Gold medal – first place	1990 Havana	Javelin throw
- Updated on 23 May 2013

Isbel Luaces McKullock (born July 20, 1975, in Camagüey, Camagüey) is a Cuban javelin thrower.

== Career ==
His personal best throw is 83.63 metres, which he achieved in July 2002 in Havana.

== Achievements ==
Year	Competition	Venue	Position	Event	Notes
Representing Cuba
1990	Central American and Caribbean Junior Championships (U-17)	Havana, Cuba	1st	Javelin	61.40 m
1991	Pan American Junior Championships	Kingston, Jamaica	3rd	Javelin	65.65 m
1993	Pan American Junior Championships	Winnipeg, Canada	2nd	Javelin	70.50 m
1994	World Junior Championships	Lisbon, Portugal	3rd	Javelin	72.82 m
1996	Ibero-American Championships	Medellín, Colombia	1st	Javelin	78.74 m CR
1996	Olympic Games	Atlanta, Georgia, United States	28th	Javelin	73.84 m
1998	Ibero-American Championships	Lisboa, Portugal	1st	Javelin	78.72 m
1998	Central American and Caribbean Games	Maracaibo, Venezuela	2nd	Javelin	78.96 m
1999	Universiade	Palma, Spain	3rd	Javelin	82.18 m
2000	Olympic Games	Sydney, Australia	28th	Javelin	75.17 m
2001	Universiade	Beijing, China	2nd	Javelin	81.68 m
2002	Ibero-American Championships	Ciudad de Guatemala, Guatemala	1st	Javelin	81.64 m CR
2003	Pan American Games	Santo Domingo, Dominican Republic	2nd	Javelin	80.95 m
2003	World Championships	Paris, France	20th	Javelin	74.07 m
2004	Ibero-American Championships	Huelva, Spain	1st	Javelin	77.98 m
2004	Olympic Games	Athens, Greece	13th	Javelin	80.07 m
2005	ALBA Games	La Habana, Cuba	1st	Javelin	79.23 m

== Seasonal bests by year ==
- 1994 - 72.82
- 1996 - 73.84
- 1998 - 80.61
- 1999 - 82.18
- 2000 - 83.30
- 2001 - 82.02
- 2002 - 83.63
- 2003 - 81.66
- 2004 - 81.12
- 2005 - 79.23
- 2006 - 76.16
