= Jadier Valladares =

Cuban weightlifter (born 1982)

Personal information
- Born: October 11, 1982 (age 43)
Medal record
Men's Weightlifting
Representing Cuba
Summer Olympics
Bronze medal – third place	2008 Beijing	– 85 kg
Pan American Games
Silver medal – second place	2007 Rio de Janeiro	– 85 kg
Pan American Championships
Silver medal – second place	2008 Callao	– 85 kg
Central American and Caribbean Games
Bronze medal – third place	2006 Cartagena	– 85 kg

Jadier Valladares Guzmán (born October 11, 1982, in Havana) is a male weightlifter from Cuba. He twice won a gold medal at the Pan American Games (2003 and 2007) for his native South American country. Valladares represented Cuba at the 2008 Summer Olympics in Beijing, PR China.
