= Nora Rocha =

Mexican long-distance runner

Personal information
- Born: 18 December 1967 (age 58) Monclova, Coahuila, Mexico
Medal record
Women's Athletics
Representing Mexico
Pan American Games
Gold medal – first place	1999 Winnipeg	10,000 metres
Silver medal – second place	2003 Santo Domingo	5,000 metres
Bronze medal – third place	2007 Rio de Janeiro	5,000 metres
Central American and Caribbean Games
Gold medal – first place	1998 Maracaibo	5,000 metres

Nora Leticia Rocha de la Cruz (born 18 December 1967) is a retired female track and field athlete from Mexico, who competed in the 5000 and 10,000 metres. She claimed the gold medal in the women's 10,000 metres at the 1999 Pan American Games in Winnipeg, Manitoba, Canada.

== Achievements ==
Year	Competition	Venue	Position	Event	Notes
Representing Mexico
1998	Central American and Caribbean Games	Maracaibo, Venezuela	2nd	1500 m	4:27.74
1998	Central American and Caribbean Games	Maracaibo, Venezuela	1st	5000 m	16:43.48
2002	Central American and Caribbean Games	San Salvador, El Salvador	3rd	5000 m	16:42.18
