= José Oliver Ruiz =

Colombian weightlifter (born 1974)

Personal information
- Born: September 18, 1974 (age 51)
Medal record
Men's weightlifting
Representing Colombia
Pan American Games
Gold medal – first place	2007 Rio de Janeiro	85 kg
Bronze medal – third place	2003 Santo Domingo	85 kg
Central American and Caribbean Games
Silver medal – second place	2006 Cartagena	85 kg

José Oliver Ruíz (born September 18, 1974) is a male weightlifter from Colombia. He won a gold medal at the 2007 Pan American Games for his native South American country.
