= Michel Batista (weightlifter) =

Cuban weightlifter (born 1977)

Personal information
- Born: 14 November 1977 (age 48) Camagüey, Cuba

Sport
- Sport: Weightlifting
Medal record
Representing Cuba
Pan American Games
Silver medal – second place	1999 Winnipeg	-105kg
Silver medal – second place	2003 Santo Domingo	-105kg

Michel Batista de Moya (born 14 November 1977) is a Cuban weightlifter. He competed at the 2000 Summer Olympics and the 2004 Summer Olympics.
