= Adriana Fernández =

Mexican long-distance runner

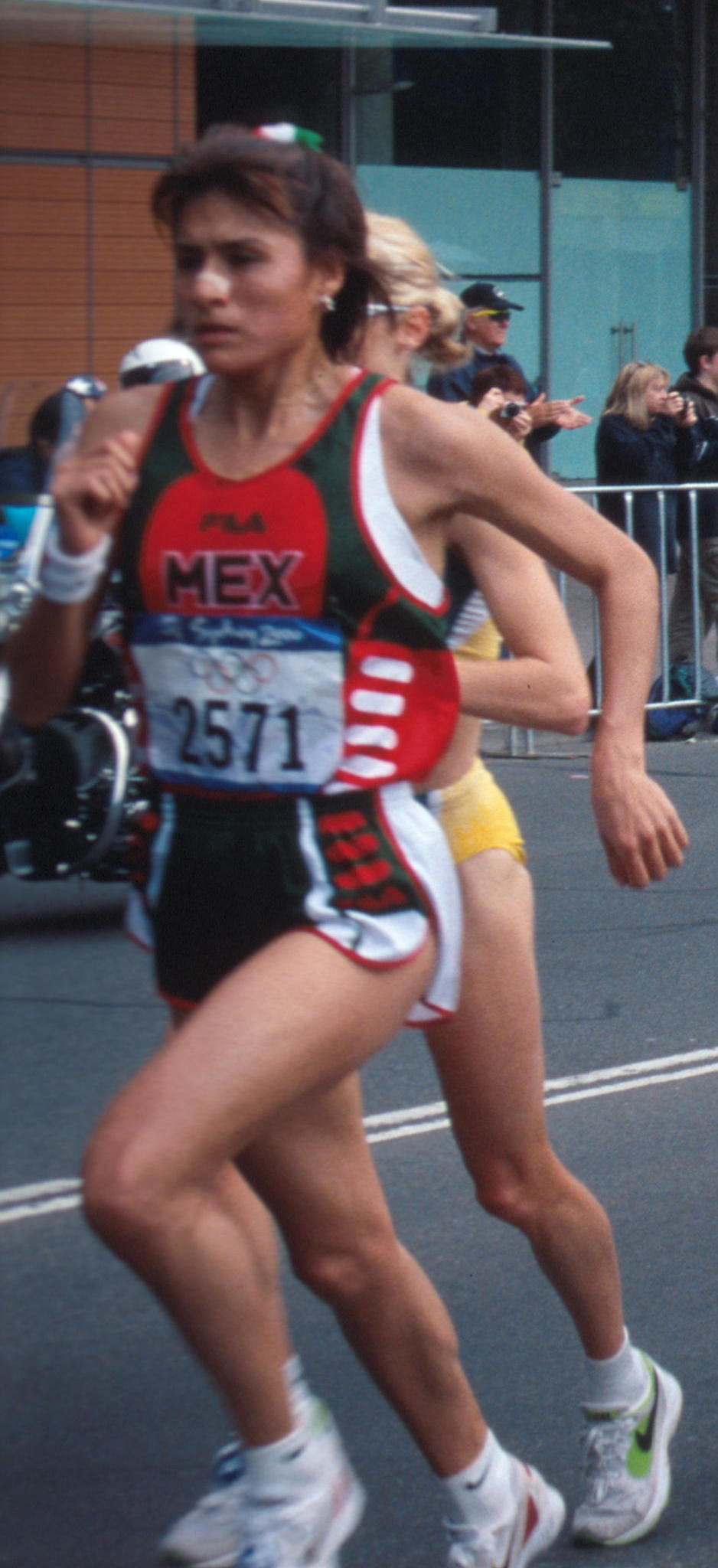
- Fernández in the marathon at the 2000 Sydney Olympics

Personal information
- Born: April 4, 1971 (age 55) Mexico City, Mexico
Medal record
Women's Athletics
Representing Mexico
Pan American Games
Gold medal – first place	1995 Mar del Plata	5,000 metres
Gold medal – first place	1999 Winnipeg	5,000 metres
Gold medal – first place	2003 Santo Domingo	5,000 metres
Gold medal – first place	2003 Santo Domingo	10,000 metres
Central American and Caribbean Games
Gold medal – first place	1998 Maracaibo	10,000 metres
Bronze medal – third place	2010 Mayagüez	5000 metres

Adriana Fernández Miranda (born April 4, 1971) is a Mexican long-distance runner.

Fernández was 2nd in 1998, and in 1999, she became the first Mexican woman to win the New York City Marathon in a time of 2:25:06 in a dominant performance by taking charge on a windy day and kept building her lead.

In 2003, Fernández held Mexican records in the 5,000 meter run, the 10,000 meter run, the half marathon, and the marathon. Her personal best time in a marathon was established at the 1999 London Marathon, where her time was 2:24:06. She represented her native country at three consecutive Summer Olympics, starting in 1996.

== Personal bests ==
- 1500 Metres – 4:15.96 – Xalapa – 13/06/2003
- 3000 Metres – 8:53.53 – Portland, OR – 25/06/2000
- 5000 Metres – 15:04.32 – Gresham, OR – 17/05/2003
- 10,000 Metres – 31:10.12 – Brunswick, ME – 01/07/2000
- 20 Kilometres – 1:06:57 – Berlin – 29/09/2002
- Half Marathon – 1:09:28 – Kyoto – 09/03/2003
- 30 Kilometres – 1:40:51 – Berlin – 29/09/2002
- Marathon – 2:24:06 – London – 18/04/1999
