= Alejandro Siqueiros =

Mexican swimmer (born 1982)

Personal information
- Full name: Alejandro Siqueiros Quiroz
- Nationality: Mexico
- Born: October 28, 1982 (age 43) Hermosillo, Sonora
- Height: 1.93 m (6 ft 4 in)
- Weight: 85 kg (187 lb)
- Spouse: Brittany Siqueiros

Sport
- Sport: Swimming
- Strokes: Freestyle

Alejandro Siqueiros Quiroz (born October 28, 1982) is a male freestyle swimmer from Mexico. He represented his native country at the 2003 Pan American Games and the 2004 Summer Olympics.
