= Leonardo Salinas =

Mexican swimmer (born 1980)

Personal information
- Born: April 8, 1980 (age 46) Monterrey, Mexico

Sport
- Sport: Swimming
Medal record
Representing Mexico
Central American and Caribbean Games
Gold medal – first place	2002 San Salvador	4x200m freestyle relay
Bronze medal – third place	2002 San Salvador	400m freestyle

Leonardo Salinas Saldaña (born 8 April 1980) is a Mexican swimmer who competed in the 2004 Summer Olympics.
