= Tulia Medina =

Colombian weightlifter (born 1983)

Personal information
- Born: March 18, 1983 (age 43) Cali, Colombia
Medal record
Women's Weightlifting
Representing Colombia
Pan American Games
Gold medal – first place	2003 Santo Domingo	–69 kg
Gold medal – first place	2007 Rio de Janeiro	–69 kg
Central American and Caribbean Games
Gold medal – first place	2006 Cartagena	–69 kg

Tulia Angela Medina Alcalde (born March 18, 1983, in Cali, Valle del Cauca) is a female weightlifter from Colombia. She won a gold medal at the 2007 Pan American Games for her native South American country. Medina twice represented Colombia at the Summer Olympics: in 2004 and 2008.
