= Herbys Márquez =

Venezuelan weightlifter (born 1980)

Personal information
- Born: December 1, 1980 (age 45)
Medal record
Men's weightlifting
Representing Venezuela
Pan American Games
Silver medal – second place	2011 Guadalajara	94 kg
Bronze medal – third place	2007 Rio de Janeiro	85 kg
Bronze medal – third place	2015 Toronto	94 kg
Pan American Championships
Gold medal – first place	2008 Callao	85 kg

Herbys Charlys Márquez (born December 1, 1980) is a male weightlifter from Venezuela. He won a medal at several editions of the Pan American Games for his native South American country. Márquez represented Venezuela at the 2008 Summer Olympics in Beijing, PR China.
