= Carlos Andica =

Colombian weightlifter (born 1983)

Personal information
- Full name: Carlos Hernán Andica
- Nationality: Colombia
- Born: 12 November 1983 (age 42) Armenia, Quindío, Colombia
- Height: 1.72 m (5 ft 7 1/2 in)
- Weight: 85 kg (187 lb)

Sport
- Sport: Weightlifting
- Event: 85 kg
Medal record
Men's weightlifting
Representing Colombia
Pan American Games
Silver medal – second place	2011 Guadalajara	85 kg

Carlos Hernán Andica (born November 12, 1983, in Armenia, Quindío) is a Colombian weightlifter. Andica was initially trained by Alfonso Gallego. Andica won a silver medal for the 85 kg class at the 2011 Pan American Games in Guadalajara, Mexico, with a total of 362 kilograms.

Andica made his official debut for the 2004 Summer Olympics in Athens, where he competed for the men's middleweight class (77 kg). He finished only in eighteenth place by five kilograms short of the record from Egypt's Mohamed El-Tantawy, with a total of 322.5 kg (142.5 in the snatch and 180 in the clean and jerk).

At the 2008 Summer Olympics in Beijing, Andica switched to a heavier class by competing in the light heavyweight class (85 kg). Andica placed eight in this event, as he successfully lifted 155 kg in the single-motion snatch, and hoisted 201 kg in the two-part, shoulder-to-overhead clean and jerk, for a total of 356 kg.
