= Carlos Espeleta =

Argentine weightlifter

Personal information
- Born: March 21, 1984 (age 41) Rosario, Santa Fe, Argentina

Sport
- Sport: Weightlifting

Carlos Luciano Espeleta (born March 21, 1984) is an Argentine weightlifter. His personal best is 317.5 kg.

He competed in Weightlifting at the 2008 Summer Olympics in the 77 kg division finishing nineteenth with 310 kg.

He is 5 ft 11 inches tall and weighs 170 lb.
