= Héctor Ballesteros =

Colombian weightlifter (born 1981)

Personal information
- Born: 18 October 1981 (age 44)
Medal record
Men's Weightlifting
Representing Colombia
Pan American Games
Gold medal – first place	2003 Santo Domingo	– 85 kg
Pan American Championships
Bronze medal – third place	2008 Callao	– 85 kg

Héctor Fabio Ballesteros Vélez (born 18 October 1981 in Cali, Valle del Cauca) is a retired male weightlifter from Colombia. He won a gold medal for his native South American country at the 2003 Pan American Games, and competed at the 2004 Summer Olympics.
