= Argenis Casimiro Núñez =

Dominican Republic boxer (born 1981)

Argenis Casimiro
Personal information
- Full name: Argenis Casimiro Núñez
- Nationality: Dominican Republic
- Born: December 30, 1981 (age 44) Santo Domingo, Distrito Nacional
- Height: 1.75 m (5 ft 9 in)
- Weight: 82 kg (181 lb)

Sport
- Sport: Boxing
- Weight class: Middleweight
Medal record
Pan American Games
Bronze medal – third place	2003 Santo Domingo	Light Heavyweight
Silver medal – second place	2007 Rio	Middleweight

Argenis Casimiro Núñez (born December 30, 1981) is a Dominican amateur boxer best known for winning two medals at the Pan Am Games.

== Career ==
In 2003, at the Pan Am Games, he beat Washington Silva but lost to Cuban southpaw Yoan Pablo Hernández in the light-heavyweight category and won bronze.

In 2005, at the Pan Am Championships (not the Pan Am Games), he lost to Yusiel Napoles.

He managed to lose weight and drop down to middleweight afterwards. At the Central American Games in 2006, he lost in the first round to eventual winner Yordanis Despaigne. At the Pan Am Games in 2007, he won silver at middleweight, losing to Emilio Correa.

At the World Championships in 2007, he KO'd Elshod Rasulov and beat two other fighters but did not win a medal because he lost to Ukrainian Sergiy Derevyanchenko. However, he qualified for the 2008 Olympics, where he lost to Alfonso Blanco.
