= Carlos Negrón =

Puerto Rican boxer

Personal information
- Nationality: Puerto Rican
- Born: Carlos José Negrón Colón; March 5, 1988 (age 38) Villalba, Puerto Rico
- Height: 6 ft 6 in (198 cm)
- Weight: Heavyweight

Boxing career
- Reach: 83 in (211 cm)
- Stance: Orthodox

Boxing record
- Total fights: 29
- Wins: 25
- Win by KO: 20
- Losses: 4
Medal record
Men's Boxing
Representing PUR
Central American and Caribbean Games
| Bronze medal – third place | 2006 Cartagena | Light heavyweight |

Carlos José Negrón Colón (born March 5, 1988) is a professional boxer who competes in the heavyweight division. As an amateur, he represented Puerto Rico at numerous international events. Among the achievements reached during this stage of his career are winning bronze medal at the 2006 Central American and Caribbean Games and winning gold in the first Olympic qualifier tournament.

== Amateur career ==
=== Early life and introduction to boxing ===
Negrón was born in the municipality of Villalba, in the central region of Puerto Rico's main island. Several members in his family were active members in the Police Department of Puerto Rico. His father is Lt. José Adolfo Negrón, and his two older brothers, José Alberto Negrón and José Alfredo Negrón also selected police service as their career. One of his uncles and several of his cousins are also police officers. Consequently, Negrón was initially attracted to a police career, but after he was introduced to boxing, he gained more interest in this sport. His brother, José Alberto, taught him the discipline and served as his trainer. At age 15 Negrón won his division's bronze medal at the 2003 Junior Olympics, which prompted him to pursue the sport as a career.

=== Pan American and Central American Games ===
In 2005 Negrón entered the Pan American championship, competing in the middleweight division. In the quarterfinals he defeated Leonel Murature of Argentina by points, 19:10. In the following round, Negrón was paired against Cristian Bautista of the Dominican Republic, winning by referee stopping contest (RSC). However, after advancing he was unable to compete against Emilio Correa in the finals, automatically losing by walkover. He subsequently ascended to the light heavyweight division. Negrón participated in the 25th Independence Cup, held in Santiago de los Caballeros from March 13–18, 2006. In the quarterfinals Negrón defeated Victor Alexander Segura of the Dominican Republic by points, 13:0. In the following round Negrón defeated Cristian Gálvez, another local pugilist, by RSC in the third round. On the tournament's last day, he won the Cup's championship versus Washington Silva, with scores of 20:6.

Negrón's only participation in the Central American and Caribbean Games was in 2006. In the preliminaries he eliminated Fitzroy Richardson of Guyana by RSC in the second round. In the quarterfinals Negrón defeated Melanio Flores of Panama by points, 17:1. In the next round, he suffered his only defeat of the tournament, losing to Yusiel Napoles by points, with scores of 14:2. With this performance, Negrón won the competition's light heavyweight bronze medal. Negrón represented Puerto Rico at the Pan American Qualifier, held in Barquisimeto, Venezuela from February 2–8, 2007. In the preliminary round he eliminated Patricio Pitto by RSC. In the quarterfinals he defeated Christopher Downs of the United States by points, 30:14. However, following an injury he abandoned the tournament, with his scheduled opponent, Yusiel Nápoles, being declared the winner by walkover. In the 2007 Pan American Games, Negrón lost to Julio Castillo of Ecuador by points (15:5) in the quarterfinals. In this year he won the Golden Golves.

=== 2008 Summer Olympics ===
To enter the 2008 Summer Olympics, Negrón participated in the first of two qualifying tournaments, held in Trinidad and Tobago. In the preliminaries he eliminated Joshua Garza of Mexico by points, 13:2. In the quarterfinals Negrón dominated Azea Augustama of Haiti, with scores of 11:0. The following round was a rematch with Silva, whom he defeated 12:4. In the finals Negrón won the tournament championship, defeating Luis González of Venezuela by points, with scores of 17:5.

On February 10, 2008, Negrón defeated Roberto Acevedo in the finals of the Campeonato Nacional Isaac Barriento de Boxeo Aficionado tournament. In a USA vs. Puerto Rico Dual held on April 26, 2008, Negrón defeated Siju Shabazz by RSC in the third round. Before the Olympics, Negrón participated in the XXXVIII International Golden Belt Tournament, in Constanţa, Romania. His first match was against local boxer Vonstantin Irimia; Negrón defeated him by technical knockout in the second round. In the finals he fought Martiney Ferenec of Hungary, defeating him by technical knockout after Ferenec abandoned the fight.

On July 8, 2008, Puerto Rico's Sports and Recreation Department offered up to $48,000 to the five Olympics-eligible boxers, if they chose to continue for a second Olympic cycle. Negrón noted that the offer was "very good" and expressed his intention to discuss it once the games were over. As part of their training the boxing team moved to South Korea to become accustomed to the time zone. After training and participating in a series of exhibition matches, the team traveled from South Korea to Beijing. In his first Olympic fight, Negrón defeated Mehdi Ghorbani of Iran on points, 13-4. Using his height and reach advantage, he managed to gain control of the score in the first round, scoring a knockdown in the third. In the second round, Negrón lost to Yerkebuian Shynaliyev of Kazakhstan by points, 9:3. The pugilist closed his amateur career after 102 fights, with a balance of 93 wins and 9 losses.

== Professional career ==
After the Olympic Games, Negrón announced his intention of abandoning the amateur circuit to pursue a professional contract. On March 3, 2009, PR Best Boxing Promotions announced that Negrón had signed with them. Negrón debuted on March 28, 2009, as part of a card titled "Noche de Campeones", which was held in Bayamón, Puerto Rico. His opponent, Miguel Ángel Jiménez, also debuted on that night. Negrón scored a knockdown in the first round, which he followed with a right punch for a second fall. Consequently, Jiménez's corner ended the fight by "throwing in the towel", awarding Negrón a technical knockout victory.

On April 25, 2009, Negrón returned to action in "Campeón vs. Campeón," where Juan Manuel López fought Gerry Peñalosa in the main event. His opponent for this contest was Tyler Hughes, who entered the fight with an experience of 52 fights, including a loss to Joe Calzaghe. Negrón dominated the fight, scoring two knockdowns. Hughes was able to stand up before the referee's protection count concluded twice, but his corner intervened, awarding the pugilist the second first-round TKO of his career. On June 28, 2009, Negrón competed in the undercard of López's title defense against Olivier Lontchi. Negrón injured his opponent, Kenneth George, by the first punch. Negrón used this to his advantage, scoring two knockdowns before the referee stopped the fight at the 1:18 mark. His next opponent was Gevonte Davis (not to be confused with world champion boxer Gervonta Davis), who scored a knockdown in the first round, before losing by technical knockout in the second.

On September 12, 2009, Negrón defeated Larry Carter by technical knockout. Less than a month later, he defeated Larry Pryor by unanimous decision in four rounds. On January 23, 2010, Negrón defeated Garrett Wilson by unanimous decision, in his last fight in the light heavyweight division. In the undercard of "Haciendo Historia", which featured a fight between Wilfredo Vázquez, Jr. and Marvin Sonsona in the main event, he defeated Roy Ashworth by knockout in the first round, after scoring three knockdowns. On April 17, 2010, Negrón defeated William Bailey by knockout in the first round. His next contest was in the undercard of a card titled "The Challenge: Juan Manuel López vs. Bernabé Concepción", where he was matched against Gustavo Enríquez, winning by unanimous decision.

== Professional boxing record ==
| 29 fights | 25 wins | 4 losses |
|---|---|---|
| By knockout | 20 | 4 |
| By decision | 5 | 0 |

| No. | Result | Record | Opponent | Type | Round, time | Date | Location | Notes |
|---|---|---|---|---|---|---|---|---|
| 29 | Loss | 25–4 | Frank Sánchez | TKO | 9 (10), 1:36 | Oct 15, 2022 | Barclays Center, New York City, New York, U.S. | For WBC Continental Americas and WBO-NABO heavyweight titles |
| 28 | Win | 25–3 | Skylar Thompson | TKO | 2 (8), 2:49 | Sep 25, 2021 | Bonaventure Resort Spa, Weston, Florida, U.S. | |
| 27 | Win | 24–3 | Antwaun Tubbs | TKO | 2 (8), 1:25 | Jul 10, 2021 | Miami Airport Convention Center, Miami, Florida, U.S. | |
| 26 | Win | 23–3 | Scott Alexander | UD | 8 | May 1, 2021 | Dignity Health Sports Park, Carson, California, U.S. | |
| 25 | Win | 22–3 | Rafael Rios | KO | 2 (6), 2:33 | Nov 7, 2020 | Microsoft Theater, Los Angeles, California, U.S. | |
| 24 | Win | 21–3 | Robert Alfonso | TKO | 1 (8), 2:03 | Mar 7, 2020 | Barclays Center, New York City, New York, U.S. | |
| 23 | Loss | 20–3 | Brian Howard | KO | 1 (10), 0:55 | Aug 3, 2019 | Barclays Center, Brooklyn, New York, U.S. | |
| 22 | Loss | 20–2 | Dominic Breazeale | KO | 9 (10), 1:37 | Dec 22, 2018 | Barclays Center, New York City, New York, U.S. | |
| 21 | Win | 20–1 | Derric Rossy | TKO | 4 (10), 1:55 | Jun 24, 2017 | Freedom Hall, Louisville, Kentucky, U.S. | Won vacant WBC Continental Americas heavyweight title |
| 20 | Win | 19–1 | Cristian Galvez | KO | 2 (10), 2:26 | Dec 19, 2016 | Coliseo Pedro Julio Nolasco, La Romana, Dominican Republic | |
| 19 | Win | 18–1 | Alexis Rafael Castillo Sanchez | TKO | 1 (8), 1:39 | Sep 15, 2016 | Gimnasio Pina Acevedo, Santo Domingo, Dominican Republic | |
| 18 | Win | 17–1 | Andy Perez | TKO | 1 (10), 1:17 | Sep 9, 2016 | Club Maquiteria, Santo Domingo, Dominican Republic | Won vacant WBC FECARBOX heavyweight title |
| 17 | Win | 16–1 | Excell Holmes | TKO | 1 (6), 2:07 | Dec 19, 2015 | Coliseo Tomas Dones, Fajardo, Puerto Rico | |
| 16 | Win | 15–1 | Sandy Antonio Soto | TKO | 2 (6), 2:25 | Dec 7, 2013 | Coliseo Pedro Julio Nolasco, La Romana, Dominican Republic | |
| 15 | Win | 14–1 | Francisco Mireles | KO | 1 (6), 2:24 | Mar 2, 2012 | Coliseo Angel 'Cholo' Espada, Salinas, Puerto Rico | |
| 14 | Loss | 13–1 | Epifanio Mendoza | TKO | 3 (6), 2:03 | Sep 2, 2011 | Coliseo Ruben Rodriguez, Bayamon, Puerto Rico | |
| 13 | Win | 13–0 | Reggie Pena | TKO | 2 (6), 2:36 | Jul 1, 2011 | Coliseo Tomas Dones, Fajardo, Puerto Rico | |
| 12 | Win | 12–0 | Emerson Chasing Bear | TKO | 4 (6), 1:23 | Apr 16, 2011 | Coliseo Ruben Rodriguez, Bayamon, Puerto Rico | |
| 11 | Win | 11–0 | Willie Herring | UD | 8 | Jan 22, 2011 | Complejo Correccional INST 1072, Bayamon, Puerto Rico | |
| 10 | Win | 10–0 | Gustavo Enriquez | UD | 4 | Jul 10, 2010 | Coliseo Jose Miguel Agrelot, San Juan, Puerto Rico | |
| 9 | Win | 9–0 | William Bailey | KO | 1 (6), 2:40 | Apr 17, 2010 | Coliseo Tomas Dones, Fajardo, Puerto Rico | |
| 8 | Win | 8–0 | Roy Ashworth | KO | 1 (6), 2:59 | Feb 27, 2010 | Coliseo Ruben Rodriguez, Bayamon, Puerto Rico | |
| 7 | Win | 7–0 | Garrett Wilson | UD | 6 | Jan 23, 2010 | Madison Square Garden, New York, New York, U.S. | |
| 6 | Win | 6–0 | Larry Pryor | UD | 4 | Oct 10, 2009 | Madison Square Garden, New York, New York, U.S. | |
| 5 | Win | 5–0 | Larry Carter | TKO | 1 (6), 2:49 | Sep 12, 2009 | Coliseo Jose Miguel Agrelot, Hato Rey, Puerto Rico | |
| 4 | Win | 4–0 | Gevonte Davis | TKO | 2 (4), 2:05 | Aug 21, 2009 | Coliseo Pedrin Zorrilla, San Juan, Puerto Rico | |
| 3 | Win | 3–0 | Kenny George | TKO | 1 (4), 1:18 | Jun 27, 2009 | Boardwalk Hall, Atlantic City, New Jersey, U.S. | |
| 2 | Win | 2–0 | Tyler Hughes | TKO | 1 (4), 1:06 | Apr 25, 2009 | Coliseo Ruben Rodriguez, Bayamon, Puerto Rico | |
| 1 | Win | 1–0 | Miguel Angel Jimenez | KO | 1 (4), 1:31 | Mar 28, 2009 | Coliseo Ruben Rodriguez, Bayamon, Puerto Rico | |
