= Eric Fields =

American boxer

Personal information
- Nickname: Danger
- Nationality: American
- Born: Eric Fields; June 14, 1982 (age 44) Ardmore, Oklahoma
- Height: 6 ft 2 in (1.88 m)
- Weight: Cruiserweight

Boxing career
- Stance: Orthodox

Boxing record
- Total fights: 28
- Wins: 24
- Win by KO: 16
- Losses: 4
- Draws: 0
- No contests: 0

Eric Fields (born June 14, 1982) is an American professional boxer. He is from Ardmore, Oklahoma.

== Amateur career ==
Fields started boxing in 2003 and became the 2005 and 2006 National Golden Gloves Heavyweight champion. In 2005 he beat Tony Grano, the U.S. Amateur Heavyweight Champion.

== Professional career ==
Fields turned pro in 2006 and won his first six fights, five by knockout, before knocking out Mexican 2004 Olympian Ramiro Reducindo on July 27, 2007, in Corona, California in the first round.

On January 18, 2008, Fields defeated former IBF cruiserweight champion Kelvin Davis by technical knockout at 55 seconds of the first round. In June 2007, Davis had broken his back in two places while training in Australia and was winless in his last eight bouts of a futile comeback attempt, getting knocked out four times after the broken back including the Fields bout. Fields dropped Davis with the first right hand he threw. Davis was subsequently knocked out in the first round again by Alexander Frenkel.

Fields suffered his first career loss against Ola Afolabi on April 12, 2008, in a bout for the vacant WBO NABO cruiserweight title, the only pro bout in which Fields went past the sixth round. Fields got tired in the 8th round, Afolabi knocking him down twice in the round. Fields managed to survive the round. In the 10th round, Fields was knocked down again, and got up, but was getting hit. The referee had to stop the fight by technical knockout at 55 seconds of the tenth round. Afolabi had not fought in two and a half years prior to the Fields bout.

Fields fought Jeff Yeoman in Oklahoma City on February 11, 2010, and won the fight by technical knockout in the 3rd round.

== Professional boxing record ==
28 fights	24 wins	4 losses
By knockout	16	3
By decision	8	1

No.	Result	Record	Opponent	Type	Round, time	Date	Location	Notes
28	Loss	24–4	(Poland) Mateusz Masternak	UD	10	2016-04-02	Kraków Arena, Kraków, Poland	
27	Loss	24–3	(Cuba) Yuniel Dorticos	KO	4 (10), 2:59	2014-04-16	(United States) Barker Hangar, Santa Monica, California, USA	For interim WBA Fedelatin & vacant USBA cruiserweight titles
26	Win	24–2	(United States) Rayford Johnson	UD	6	2014-02-21	(United States) Empire State Plaza, Albany, New York, USA	
25	Win	23–2	(United States) Jonte Willis	MD	8	2013-11-09	(United States) Whitehall Armory, Whitehall, New York, USA	
24	Loss	22–2	(Democratic Republic of the Congo) Ilunga Makabu	KO	5 (12), 1:59	2013-08-31	Emperors Palace, Kempton Park, South Africa	For WBC Silver cruiserweight title
23	Win	22–1	(Puerto Rico) Alexis Mejias	RTD	5 (8), 3:00	2013-08-03	(United States) Whitehall Athletic Club, Whitehall, New York, USA	
22	Win	21–1	(United States) Kevin Franklin	UD	6	2012-10-27	(United States) Turning Stone Resort Casino, Verona, New York, USA	
21	Win	20–1	(United States) Derrick Brown	UD	8	2012-01-28	(United States) Turning Stone Resort Casino, Verona, New York, USA	
20	Win	19–1	(United States) Rubin Williams	TKO	2 (10)	2011-09-02	(United States) Riverwind Casino, Norman, Oklahoma, USA	
19	Win	18–1	(United States) Danny Batchelder	UD	8	2011-06-17	(United States) Cox Convention Center, Oklahoma City, Oklahoma, USA	
18	Win	17–1	(Colombia) Jose Luis Herrera	TKO	4 (8), 0:50	2010-12-14	(United States) Cox Convention Center, Oklahoma City, Oklahoma, USA	
17	Win	16–1	(United States) Harvey Jolly	KO	3 (8), 2:37	2010-08-13	(United States) Cox Convention Center, Oklahoma City, Oklahoma, USA	
16	Win	15–1	(United States) Edward Gutierrez	UD	6	2010-05-21	(United States) Cox Convention Center, Oklahoma City, Oklahoma, USA	
15	Win	14–1	(United States) Jeff Yeoman	TKO	3 (6), 0:47	2010-02-11	(United States) Remington Park, Oklahoma City, Oklahoma, USA	
14	Win	13–1	(United States) Adam Harris	TKO	4 (6), 1:54	2009-11-12	(United States) Remington Park, Oklahoma City, Oklahoma, USA	
13	Win	12–1	(Mexico) Francisco Mireles	TKO	2 (6), 2:34	2009-01-10	(United States) Emerald Queen Casino, Tacoma, Washington, USA	
12	Loss	11–1	(United Kingdom) Ola Afolabi	TKO	10 (10), 0:55	2008-04-12	(United States) Emerald Queen Casino, Tacoma, Washington, USA	For vacant WBO-NABO cruiserweight title
11	Win	11–0	(United States) Kelvin Davis	TKO	1 (10), 0:55	2008-01-18	(United States) Mallory Square, Key West, Florida, USA	
10	Win	10–0	(United States) Eric Pippin	KO	1 (6), 2:43	2008-01-04	(United States) Million Dollar Elm Casino, Tulsa, Oklahoma, USA	
9	Win	9–0	(United States) Clinton Bonds	TKO	1 (6), 1:08	2007-11-02	(United States) Emerald Queen Casino, Tacoma, Washington, USA	
8	Win	8–0	(United States) Victor Barragan	UD	6	2007-09-01	(United States) Emerald Queen Casino, Tacoma, Washington, USA	
7	Win	7–0	(Mexico) Ramiro Reducindo	KO	1 (6), 1:39	2007-07-27	(United States) Omega Products International, Corona, California, USA	
6	Win	6–0	(United States) Roland Graham	KO	1 (4), 1:22	2007-06-23	(United States) Emerald Queen Casino, Tacoma, Washington, USA	
5	Win	5–0	(United States) Cornell Davis	UD	4	2007-05-24	(United States) Marriott Hotel, Irvine, California, USA	
4	Win	4–0	(United States) Don Jones	TKO	1 (4), 2:23	2006-11-09	(United States) Michael's Eighth Avenue, Glen Burnie, Maryland, USA	
3	Win	3–0	(United States) Maurice Winslow	KO	1 (4), 1:04	2006-10-27	(United States) RBC Center, Raleigh, North Carolina, USA	
2	Win	2–0	(United States) Steven Archie	TKO	3 (4), 2:29	2006-10-23	(United States) Martin's West, Woodlawn, Maryland, USA	
1	Win	1–0	(United States) Tim Harris	TKO	1 (4), 2:24	2006-07-27	(United States) Mohegan Sun Casino, Uncasville, Connecticut, USA	
