= Isidro Mosquea =

Dominican Republic boxer (born 1976)

Personal information
- Born: 14 August 1976 (age 49)
Medal record
Men's Boxing
Representing the Dominican Republic
Pan American Games
Silver medal – second place	2003	Light Welterweight
Central American and Caribbean Games
Bronze medal – third place	1998	Light Welterweight
Bronze medal – third place	2002	Light Welterweight

Isidro Mosquea Rodríguez (born 14 August 1976) is a boxer from the Dominican Republic.

He participated in the 2004 Summer Olympics for his native Caribbean country. There he was stopped in the first round of the Light welterweight (64 kg) division by Morocco's Hicham Nafil.

Mosquea won the silver medal in the same division one year earlier, at the Pan American Games in Santo Domingo.
