= Juan Ubaldo =

Dominican Republic boxer (born 1979)

Personal information
- Full name: Juan José Ubaldo Cabrera
- Born: 30 April 1979 (age 47) Santo Domingo, Distrito Nacional, Dominican Republic
Medal record
Men's boxing
Representing the Dominican Republic
Pan American Games
| Gold medal – first place | 2003 Santo Domingo | Middleweight |
Central American and Caribbean Games
| Silver medal – second place | 2002 San Salvador | Light Middleweight |

Juan José Ubaldo Cabrera (born 30 April 1979, in Santo Domingo, Distrito Nacional) is a boxer from the Dominican Republic best known to win the PanAm title at middleweight as an amateur.

== Amateur ==
At the Sydney Olympics 2000 he lost in the first round to local hero Richard Rowles.

Ubaldo won Light Middleweight silver at the 2002 Central American Games losing to Juan Camilo Novoa.

He added the gold medal at middleweight 2003, at the Pan American Games in Santo Domingo. He defeated Jean Pascal 19:11 and Yordanis Despaigne 23:12.

He participated in the 2004 Summer Olympics for his native Caribbean country. There he was stopped in the first round of the Middleweight (75 kg) division by Cameroon's Hassan Ndam Njikam.

== Pro ==
He turned pro in 2005 and beat his first 11 opponents.
