= Victor Bisbal =

Puerto Rican boxer

Personal information
- Nickname: Vitito
- Nationality: Puerto Rican
- Born: Victor José Bisbal Melero; 2 July 1980 (age 46) Salinas, Puerto Rico
- Weight: Heavyweight

Boxing career
- Stance: Orthodox

Boxing record
- Total fights: 28
- Wins: 23
- Win by KO: 17
- Losses: 5
Medal record
Representing Puerto Rico
Pan American Games
Bronze medal – third place	2003 Santo Domingo	Super Heavyweight
Central American and Caribbean Games
Gold medal – first place	2002 San Salvador	Heavyweight

Victor José Bisbal Melero (born 2 July 1980) is a Puerto Rican professional boxer. As an amateur, he won a gold medal at the 2002 Central American and Caribbean Games in the heavyweight division and bronze at the 2003 Pan American Games. He also participated at the 2004 Olympics in the super heavyweight division.

== Personal life ==
Victor Bisbal began in the sport at the age of 15 years. Before beginning boxing, he competed in hurling and discus, winning four LAI championship rings in University competition and holding many Puerto Rican distance records. He graduated in 2005 with a bachelor's degree in Physical Education from the University of Turabo in Puerto Rico. Victor got married on March 13, 2010 to Mariler Mejias, a volleyball player. Victor has three siblings, brothers Ricardo and Gerardo and sister Mayela. His brother Gerardo Bisbal is also a boxer and National Champ of Puerto Rico, bronze medallist in 2002 in 81 kg, 2006 in +91 kg and 2010 gold medallist Central American and Caribbean Games, having participated in 2003 in 91 kg and 2007 in +91 kg Pan American Games.

Bisbal worked with the Sports and Recreation Department and the Salinas municipal gym for years. However, he was ousted when Ricardo Rosselló won the 2016 elections. Afterwards, Bisbal joined his brother (who is a mechanic by profession, like their father) in operating a workshop at Salinas.

== Amateur achievements ==
Record 60–11 Puerto Rican National Champ 1999–2004 Bisbal began boxing as an amateur at 18 years old; he had victories against Jason Estrada (USA) (2 times), David Cadieux (CAN) (2 times), Davin King (USA) (1-1), George Garcia (USA, MEX) (1-1)

He was defeated by Manuel Azar (ARG)(once), Pedro Carrion and Michel López Núñez (CUB)(once), Davin King, George Garcia and Calvin Brock (USA)(once), Andrey Derevtsov (RUS)(once), Bermane Stiverne (CAN), Sebastian Koeber (GER), Jaroslav Jakstov (LIT) (once)

He participated in 1999 Pan American Games Qualification Tournament for Central American - Salinas, Puerto Rico. These were his first amateur fights. Results were:

won against Benjamin Garcia (MEX) 11:10 quarterfinal

won against Leon Palmer (JAM) RSC 3 semifinal

won against Juan Romans (COS) 9:6 final

Participated in 1999 Pan American Games in Winnipeg, Canada with only 7 fights, results were: +91 kg

lost against Manuel Azar (ARG) 14:7 quarterfinal

Participated in 2000 Boxing Olympic Qualifications, results were:

lost against Calvin Brock (USA) RSCH 3

Participated in 2002 Central American and Caribbean Games, Cartagena, Colombia results were: 91 kg won gold medal

won against Cesar Uribe (MEX) KO 1, bodyshot, quarter final

won against Elibert Cova (VEN) walkover, semifinal

won against Kertson Manswell (TRI) RSCO 4, final

Participated 2002 World cup, Azerbaijan results were: +91 kg Participated with Mexican team because Puerto Rico did not participate.

Mexico vs Korea

won against Mouzafar Saipov (KOR) walkover

Mexico vs Russia

Lost against Andrey Derevtsov (RUS) 21:19 After this fight the spectators booed the decision.

- 2003 Pan American Games, Santo Domingo, Republica Dominicana results were: +91 kg won bronze medal
  - won against David Cadieux (CAN) 19:12 quarter-final
  - lost against Michel López Núñez (CUB) 17:13 semifinal
- 2004 Titan Games Atlanta, USA result were:
  - lost against Sebastian Koeber (GER) 25-18
- 2004 Boxing Olympic Qualifications Tijuana, Mexico results were:
  - lost against Bermane Stiverne (CAN) points doubtful decision
  - after Bermane Stiverne lost against George Garcia (MEX)
- 2004 Boxing Olympic Qualifications Rio de Janeiro, Brasil results were:
  - won against Freeman Smith (BER) RSCO semifinal
  - won against George Garcia (MEX) 23-19 final
- 2004 Olympic Games Athens, Greece result were:
  - lost against Jaroslavas Jaksto (LTU) 26:17 preliminaries

== Professional career ==
Bisbal signed with Top Rank for his professional debut in the year 2005, but after a defeat he continued his career without a promoter. He continued fighting and his manager was Evangelista Cotto, Bisbal posting a record of 13-1 11 knockouts. In 2009, a year since his fight number 15, Victor Bisbal began with a new manager Orlando Piñeiro, who also manages Juan Manuel Lopez, hoping that his career will reach many championship titles. Victor and Juan Manuel are very good friends, Victor can always be seen in the ring before and after Juan Manuel's importants fights.

== Professional boxing record ==
28 fights	23 wins	5 losses
By knockout	17	4
By decision	6	0
By disqualification	0	1

No.	Result	Record	Opponent	Type	Round, time	Date	Location	Notes
28	Loss	23–5	Devin Vargas	DQ	8 (8), 1:02	18 Jan 2020	Turning Stone Resort Casino, Verona, New York, US	Bisbal disqualified for repeated low blows
27	Loss	23–4	Frank Sánchez	RTD	4 (10), 3:00	31 Aug 2019	Minneapolis Armory, Minneapolis, Minnesota, US	For vacant WBO-NABO heavyweight title
26	Win	23–3	Edson Roberto Dos Santos Borges	TKO	1 (10), 1:01	7 Dec 2018	Cancha Ruben Zayas Montanez, Trujillo Alto, Puerto Rico	Won WBO interim Latino heavyweight title
25	Win	22–3	Frankenide Farias Mola	TKO	5 (8), 1:03	18 Jun 2016	Gimnasio Wilfredo Rivera, Santo Domingo, Dominican Republic	
24	Loss	21–3	Dominic Breazeale	TKO	4 (8), 1:28	7 Mar 2015	MGM Grand Garden Arena, Las Vegas, Nevada, US	
23	Loss	21–2	Magomed Abdusalamov	TKO	5 (10), 1:12	8 Mar 2013	Resorts Casino Hotel, Atlantic City, New Jersey, US	For WBC–USNBC Silver heavyweight title
22	Win	21–1	Alex González	TKO	6 (8), 1:23	6 Oct 2012	Coliseo Rubén Rodríguez, Bayamón, Puerto Rico	
21	Win	20–1	Robert Daniels	TKO	3 (8), 1:10	2 Mar 2012	Coliseo Angel 'Cholo' Espada, Salinas, Puerto Rico	
20	Win	19–1	Willie Herring	UD	8	16 Apr 2011	Coliseo Rubén Rodríguez, Bayamón, Puerto Rico	
19	Win	18–1	Brock Stodden	TKO	1 (6), 2:50	25 Sep 2010	Coliseo Angel 'Cholo' Espada, Salinas, Puerto Rico	
18	Win	17–1	David Whittom	KO	1 (6), 2:33	10 Jul 2010	José Miguel Agrelot Coliseum, Hato Rey, Puerto Rico	
17	Win	16–1	Charles Davis	UD	6	26 Feb 2010	Coliseo Rubén Rodríguez, Bayamón, Puerto Rico	
16	Win	15–1	Ruben Rivera	UD	4	24 Oct 2009	Roberto Clemente Coliseum, San Juan, Puerto Rico	
15	Win	14–1	Zack Page	UD	6	12 Sep 2009	José Miguel Agrelot Coliseum, Hato Rey, Puerto Rico	
14	Win	13–1	Ronald Bellamy	TKO	4 (6)	1 Nov 2008	Coliseo Angel 'Cholo' Espada, Salinas, Puerto Rico	
13	Win	12–1	Matt Green	KO	1 (8), 1:27	31 May 2008	Coliseo Angel 'Cholo' Espada, Salinas, Puerto Rico	
12	Win	11–1	Jerry Butler	TKO	5 (8), 2:54	1 Mar 2008	Coliseo Angel 'Cholo' Espada, Salinas, Puerto Rico	
11	Win	10–1	William Cook	TKO	2 (6), 1:26	1 Feb 2008	Coliseo Rafael G Amalbert, Juncos, Puerto Rico	
10	Win	9–1	Vernon Woodward	KO	2 (8), 1:44	11 Aug 2007	Coliseo Angel 'Cholo' Espada, Salinas, Puerto Rico	
9	Win	8–1	Jimmy Suarez	KO	1 (4), 1:52	11 May 2007	Coliseo Angel 'Cholo' Espada, Salinas, Puerto Rico	
8	Win	7–1	Jose Lugo	TKO	3 (6)	24 Feb 2007	Coliseo Angel 'Cholo' Espada, Salinas, Puerto Rico	
7	Win	6–1	Robbie McClimans	UD	6	8 Dec 2006	Desert Diamond Casino, Tucson, Arizona, US	
6	Loss	5–1	Domonic Jenkins	KO	2 (6), 1:31	8 Apr 2006	Thomas & Mack Center, Las Vegas, Nevada, US	
5	Win	5–0	James Harling	TKO	3 (6), 1:29	3 Feb 2006	Coliseo Pedrín Zorrilla, Hato Rey, Puerto Rico	
4	Win	4–0	Bridger Bercier	TKO	5 (6), 0:46	12 Nov 2005	Wynn Resort, Las Vegas, Nevada, US	
3	Win	3–0	Victor James	TKO	2 (4), 1:23	22 Jun 2005	Madison Square Garden, New York City, New York, US	
2	Win	2–0	Jose Lugo	KO	1 (4), 1:50	26 Feb 2005	Coliseo Rubén Rodríguez, Bayamón, Puerto Rico	
1	Win	1–0	Douglas Robertson	UD	4	22 Jan 2005	American Airlines Arena, Miami, Florida, US	
