= Juan Camilo Novoa =

Colombian boxer (born 1981)

Personal information
- Born: October 5, 1981 (age 44) Santa Fé, Antioquia, Colombia

Sport
- Sport: Boxing
Medal record
Men's boxing
Representing Colombia
Central American and Caribbean Games
Gold medal – first place	2002 San Salvador	Light middleweight

Juan Camilo Novoa Aguinaga (born October 5, 1981) is a Colombian professional boxer. As an amateur, he won a gold medal at the 2002 Central American and Caribbean Games at junior middleweight vs Juan Ubaldo. He is nicknamed "La Boa".

== Amateur career ==
He qualified for the Olympic Games by ending up in first place at the 2nd AIBA American 2004 Olympic Qualifying Tournament in Rio de Janeiro, Brazil. He moved down to welterweight to participate in the 2004 Summer Olympics for his native country. There he was beaten in the quarterfinals of the welterweight (69 kg) division by Korea's Kim Jung Joo.

== Professional career ==
He turned professional at middleweight and is 12–1, the loss being a stoppage defeat in the first round.
