= Aaron Garcia (boxer) =

American boxer

Aaron García
Personal information
- Nickname: El Gavilan
- Born: Aaron García; June 14, 1982 (age 44) Vista, California
- Height: 5 ft 7 in (172 cm)
- Weight: Super Featherweight; Featherweight

Boxing career
- Reach: 68 in (174 cm)
- Stance: Orthodox

Boxing record
- Total fights: 20
- Wins: 14
- Win by KO: 4
- Losses: 4
- Draws: 2
- No contests: 0
Medal record
Representing United States
Pan American Games
Silver medal – second place	2003 Santo Domingo	Featherweight

Aaron García (born June 14, 1982) is an American boxer in the Featherweight division. He earned the featherweight silver medal at the 2003 Pan American Games.

== Amateur titles ==
- 1999 National Golden Gloves bantamweight champion
- 2001 National Golden Gloves featherweight champion
- 2003 United States Amateur featherweight champion

== Professional career ==
He made his professional debut on September 18, 2004, against Gerardo Robles. Aaron retired from the boxing in 2006 after an upset loss to the veteran Saul Ochoa, but returned in 2008.

On February 26, 2011 García upset title contender Alejandro Lopez (20-1). The bout was held at the Palms Casino Resort in Las Vegas, Nevada.

== Professional boxing record ==
20 fights	14 wins	4 losses
By knockout	4	2
By decision	10	2
Draws	2	

No.	Result	Record	Opponent	Type	Round, time	Date	Location	Notes
20	Loss	14–4–2	(Mexico) Daniel Ramirez	TKO	4 (8), 1:02	Jul 25, 2014	(United States) Crowne Plaza Hotel, San Diego, California, U.S.	For vacant California super featherweight title
19	Win	14–3–2	(United States) Thomas Herrera	UD	4	Mar 7, 2014	(United States) Pala Casino Resort and Spa, Pala, California, U.S.	
18	Win	13–3–2	(United States) Kevin Hoskins	KO	5 (6), 0:43	Nov 21, 2013	(United States) Crowne Plaza Hotel, San Diego, California, U.S.	
17	Win	12–3–2	(United States) Johnny Frazier	UD	4	Jul 25, 2013	(United States) Four Points Sheraton Hotel, San Diego, California, U.S.	
16	Win	11–3–2	(Mexico) Cesar Garcia	RTD	1 (6), 3:00	May 24, 2013	(United States) Bing Crosby Hall, San Diego, California, U.S.	
15	Loss	10–3–2	(Philippines) Bernabe Concepcion	SD	10	Oct 27, 2011	(United States) San Manuel Indian Casino, Highland, California, U.S.	For vacant WBC Continental Americas featherweight title
14	Loss	10–2–2	(United States) Abraham Lopez	MD	8	Apr 29, 2011	(United States) DoubleTree Hotel, Ontario, California, U.S.	
13	Win	10–1–2	(Mexico) Alejandro Lopez	MD	4	Feb 26, 2011	(United States) Palms Casino Resort, Las Vegas, Nevada, U.S.	
12	Draw	9–1–2	(Mexico) Jesús Antonio Hernández	PTS	6	Sep 11, 2009	(United States) DoubleTree Hotel, Ontario, California, U.S.	
11	Draw	9–1–1	(Mexico) Jesús Antonio Hernández	MD	6	Jun 12, 2009	(United States) DoubleTree Hotel, Ontario, California, U.S.	
10	Win	9–1	(United States) Gabe Garcia	UD	6	Sep 11, 2008	(United States) 4th and B, San Diego, California, U.S.	
9	Win	8–1	(Mexico) Arturo Valenzuela	UD	6	May 29, 2008	(United States) Swiss Park, Chula Vista, California, U.S.	
8	Loss	7–1	(United States) Saul Ochoa	TKO	3 (6), 2:14	May 6, 2006	(United States) MGM Grand Garden Arena, Paradise, Nevada, U.S.	
7	Win	7–0	(Mexico) Angel Eduardo Mata	UD	4	Dec 8, 2005	(United States) 4th and B, San Diego, California, U.S.	
6	Win	6–0	(Mexico) Javier Flores	UD	4	Sep 1, 2005	(United States) Desert Diamond Casino, Tucson, Arizona, U.S.	
5	Win	5–0	(Mexico) Carlos Mota	TKO	2 (6), 1:23	Jul 14, 2005	(United States) Orleans Hotel & Casino, Las Vegas, Nevada, U.S.	
4	Win	4–0	(Mexico) Carlos Mota	TKO	4 (6), 1:43	May 5, 2005	(United States) Desert Diamond Casino, Tucson, Arizona, U.S.	
3	Win	3–0	(United States) Brian Garcia	UD	6	Apr 9, 2005	(United States) Don Haskins Center, El Paso, Texas, U.S.	
2	Win	2–0	(United States) Miguel Medina	UD	4	Feb 17, 2005	(United States) Avalon Hollywood, Los Angeles, California, U.S.	
1	Win	1–0	(United States) Gerardo Robles	UD	4	Sep 18, 2004	(United States) MGM Grand Garden Arena, Paradise, Nevada, U.S.	
