= Luis González (Venezuelan boxer) =

Venezuelan boxer

Personal information
- Full name: Luis Arturo González Hurtado
- Nationality: Venezuela
- Born: August 6, 1984 (age 41) Caracas, Venezuela
- Height: 6 ft 0 in (1.83 m)
- Weight: 178 lb (81 kg)

Sport
- Sport: Boxing
- Weight class: Light Heavyweight

Luis Arturo González Hurtado (born August 6, 1984) is a Venezuelan Multi Champion boxer who competed in the 2008 Summer Olympics in the men's light-heavyweight division.

At the World Championships in 2007, he lost his first bout to Jahon Qurbonov.

At the Olympic qualifier, he upset Julio Castillo and Christopher Downs by RSCO (20:0), and then lost the meaningless final to Carlos Negron.

At his Olympic debut, he suffered a first round RSC to Hungarian Imre Szellő.
