= Kelvin Davis (boxer) =

American boxer (born 1978)

Personal information
- Nickname: Concrete
- Born: May 26, 1978 (age 48) Natchez, Mississippi, USA
- Height: 5 ft 7 in (170 cm)
- Weight: Cruiserweight

Boxing career

Boxing record
- Total fights: 38
- Wins: 24
- Win by KO: 17
- Losses: 11
- Draws: 3
- No contests: 0

Kelvin Davis (born May 26, 1978) is an American professional boxer. He is a former IBF cruiserweight champion.

== Professional career ==
Known as "Concrete", Davis, a compact pressure fighter, turned pro in 1999. He was undefeated in his first 20 fights, including a draw with veteran David Vedder (21–19–3) in 2001 and a points win over 37-year-old former IBF-titleholder Arthur Williams. He lost for the first time to little-known Ravea Springs (24–2).

In 2003 he got an IBF-eliminator fight against O'Neil Bell, who knocked him out.

Unimpressed by these losses the IBF put him in another eliminator with another Don King-fighter in Louis Azille. He won the fight by close decision.

In 2004 he won the vacant IBF title against hard-punching southpaw Ezra Sellars but never defended it.

In 2005 he lost by KO to Guillermo Jones and on points to undefeated Steve Cunningham.

He drew with heavyweight Charles Shufford in 2006 but was knocked out by puncher Darnell Wilson in 2007.

=== Injury and recovery ===
While training for a heavyweight bout against Shane Cameron, Davis suffered an injury while on a training run in June 2007, jumping over Auckland's Upper Harbour Bridge to avoid a car. Davis was forced to spend the next month in New Zealand after being hospitalized with a broken neck and broken back in two places. After 11 hours of surgery, Davis began recovering, and many speculated that his boxing future was in doubt. Davis recovered from his injury and returned to the ring in November 2007. He lost a decision to undefeated Carl Davis Drumond. Davis was winless in his last eight bouts, including suffering first round knockouts to Eric Fields and Alexander Frenkel.

=== Retirement ===
Davis retired live on ESPN2's Friday Night Fights on January 18, 2008, after his TKO loss to prospect Eric Fields.

== Professional boxing record ==
38 fights	24 wins	11 losses
By knockout	17	6
By decision	7	5
Draws	3	

Result	Record	Opponent	Type	Round, time	Date	Location	Notes
Loss	20-0	(Germany) Alexander Frenkel	TKO	1	07/11/2009	Nuremberg, Germany	Referee stopped the bout at 2:07 of the first round.
Draw	20-11-1	(United States) Michael Simms	PTS	6	07/08/2009	(United States) Sacramento, California, U.S.	
Loss	5-8-1	(United States) Leo Bercier	UD	6	30/01/2009	(United States) Sacramento, California, U.S.	
Loss	15-0-1	(United States) Marcus Oliveira	TKO	3	25/10/2008	(United States) Columbia, South Carolina, U.S.	Referee stopped the bout at 0:59 of the third round.
Loss	10-0	(United States) Eric Fields	TKO	1	18/01/2008	(United States) Key West, Florida, U.S.	Referee stopped the bout at 0:55 of the first round.
Loss	22-0	(Costa Rica) Carl Davis Drumond	UD	10	17/11/2007	San Jose, Costa Rica	
Loss	29-2-1	(United States) Terry Smith	UD	10	11/05/2007	(United States) Miami, Oklahoma, U.S.	
Loss	20-5-3	(United States) Darnell Wilson	TKO	3	23/02/2007	(United States) Scranton, Pennsylvania, U.S.	Referee stopped the bout at 1:03 of the third round.
Win	20-27-3	(United States) Willie Chapman	UD	8	05/01/2007	(United States) Las Vegas, Nevada, U.S.	
Win	5-9-1	(United States) Paul King	PTS	4	21/10/2006	(United Kingdom) London, England	
Win	16-5-2	(United States) Chris Thomas	TKO	5	19/08/2006	(United States) Reno, Nevada, U.S.	Referee stopped the bout at 0:49 of the fifth round.
Draw	20-6	(United States) Charles Shufford	PTS	6	07/07/2006	(United States) Hyannis, Massachusetts, U.S.	
Loss	17-0	(United States) Steve Cunningham	UD	12	03/09/2005	(United States) Cleveland, Ohio, U.S.	
Loss	31-3-2	(Panama) Guillermo Jones	TKO	4	21/05/2005	(United States) Chicago, Illinois, U.S.	Referee stopped the bout at 0:42 of the fourth round.
Win	27-5	(United States) Ezra Sellers	TKO	8	01/05/2004	(United States) Miami, Florida, U.S.	IBF Cruiserweight Title. Referee stopped the bout at 2:33 of the eighth round.
Win	18-1-2	(Dominica) Louis Azille	SD	12	24/10/2003	(United States) Bushkill, Pennsylvania, U.S.	
Loss	20-1-1	(Jamaica) O'Neil Bell	TKO	11	23/05/2003	(United States) Concho, Oklahoma, U.S.	USBA/NABF Cruiserweight Titles. Referee stopped the bout at 1:03 of the 11th round.
Win	29-6	(Brazil) Rogerio Lobo	TKO	1	21/02/2003	(United States) Las Vegas, Nevada, U.S.	IBA Americas Cruiserweight Title. Referee stopped the bout at 0:42 of the first round.
Loss	24-2	(United States) Ravea Springs	UD	10	16/08/2002	(United States) Saratoga Springs, New York, U.S.	
Win	12-3	(United States) Tipton Walker	TKO	7	24/05/2002	(United States) Tulsa, Oklahoma, U.S.	Referee stopped the bout at 2:51 of the seventh round.
Win	34-6-1	(United States) Arthur Williams	SD	12	23/03/2002	(United States) Las Vegas, Nevada, U.S.	USBA Cruiserweight Title.
Draw	21-19-3	(United States) David Vedder	PTS	6	08/09/2001	(United States) Reno, Nevada, U.S.	
Win	13-19	(United States) Derek Amos	TKO	1	14/07/2001	(United States) Denver, Colorado, U.S.	
Win	5-1	(United States) Bobby Scoggins	TKO	2	01/06/2001	(United States) San Antonio, Texas, U.S.	Referee stopped the bout at 1:31 of the second round.
Win	4-6-1	(United States) Alphonzo Davis	TKO	2	02/02/2001	(United States) Reno, Nevada, U.S.	
Win	13-26-8	(United States) Wesley Martin	KO	1	17/11/2000	(United States) Reno, Nevada, U.S.	
Win	8-16-2	(United States) Anthony Moore	UD	6	22/10/2000	(United States) Reno, Nevada, U.S.	
Win	6-0	(United States) Maurice Marshall	KO	1	09/09/2000	(United States) New Orleans, Louisiana, U.S.	Marshall knocked out at 0:28 of the first round.
Win	7-18-3	(United States) Bradley Rone	UD	4	24/06/2000	(United States) Reno, Nevada, U.S.	
Win	4-1	(United States) Chris Thomas	KO	2	13/05/2000	(United States) Indianapolis, Indiana, U.S.	
Win	3-3-1	(United States) James Johnson	KO	6	28/04/2000	(United States) Lafayette, Louisiana, U.S.	
Win	4-8-2	(United States) Craig Brinson	TKO	2	26/02/2000	(United States) Biloxi, Mississippi, U.S.	Referee stopped the bout at 1:49 of the second round.
Win	4-5	(North Macedonia) Errol Sadikovski	TKO	2	15/01/2000	(United States) New York City, U.S.	
Win	5-0	(United States) Marvin Hunt	TKO	2	26/11/1999	(United States) New Orleans, Louisiana, U.S.	
Win	1-3	(United States) Chico Copeland	TKO	1	19/11/1999	(United States) Tunica, Mississippi, U.S.	Referee stopped the bout at 0:45 of the first round.
Win	4-1	(United States) Carl Harrell	UD	4	11/11/1999	(United States) Biloxi, Mississippi, U.S.	
Win	--	(United States) Joe Johnson	TKO	1	15/10/1999	(United States) Pensacola, Florida, U.S.	Referee stopped the bout at 1:08 of the first round.
Win	2-0-1	(United States) Randy Worth	TKO	2	01/10/1999	(United States) Tunica, Mississippi, U.S.	Referee stopped the bout at 2:45 of the second round.

== See also ==
- List of cruiserweight boxing champions

Achievements
Vacant Title last held by James Toney	IBF cruiserweight champion May 1, 2004 - May 20, 2005; Vacated	Vacant Title next held by O'Neil Bell
