= Boxing at the 2006 Central American and Caribbean Games =

Boxing competitions

- Venue: World Trade Center Veracruz
- Location: Cartagena, Colombia
- Dates: 20–27 July

The Boxing Tournament at the 2006 Central American and Caribbean Games was held in Cartagena, Colombia from July 20 to July 27.

== Medal winners ==
Event	Gold	Silver	Bronze
Light Flyweight (– 48 kilograms)	McWilliams Arroyo; Puerto Rico	Odilion Zaleta; Mexico	Yan Bartelemí; Cuba Oscar Negrete; Colombia
Flyweight (– 51 kilograms)	Juan Carlos Payano; Dominican Republic	Yoandri Salinas; Cuba	McJoe Arroyo; Puerto Rico Braulio Ávila; Mexico
Bantamweight (– 54 kilograms)	Guillermo Rigondeaux; Cuba	Arturo Santos Reyes; Mexico	Jonathan Romero; Colombia Héctor Manzanilla; Venezuela
Featherweight (– 57 kilograms)	Carlos Velasquez; Puerto Rico	Ronald de la Rosa; Dominican Republic	Yuriolkis Gamboa; Cuba Nicholas Walters; Jamaica
Lightweight (– 60 kilograms)	Yordenis Ugás; Cuba	Óscar Díaz; Dominican Republic	Lisandro Bolivar; Venezuela José Mosquera; Colombia
Light Welterweight (– 64 kilograms)	Yudel Johnson; Cuba	Hugo Moolenaar; US Virgin Islands	Kenny Galarza; Puerto Rico Pedro Salinas; Colombia
Welterweight (– 69 kilograms)	Erislandi Lara; Cuba	Melvin Santana; Dominican Republic	Jean Carlos Prada; Venezuela Alexis Ares; Puerto Rico
Middleweight (– 75 kilograms)	Yordanis Despaigne; Cuba	Andrew Fermin; Trinidad and Tobago	Alexander Brand; Colombia Gustavo Caicedo; Panama
Light Heavyweight (– 81 kilograms)	Yusiel Nápoles; Cuba	Shawn Terry Cox; Barbados	Carlos Negron; Puerto Rico Ismael Mendoza; Nicaragua
Heavyweight (– 91 kilograms)	Osmay Acosta; Cuba	Jose Julio Payares; Venezuela	Jhon Nieves; Colombia Anderson Emmanuel; Barbados
Super Heavyweight (+ 91 kilograms)	Michel López Núñez; Cuba	Cristian Cabrera; Dominican Republic	Gerardo Bisbal; Puerto Rico Jhonny Molina; Venezuela
