= Yordanis Despaigne =

Cuban boxer (born 1980)

Personal information
- Nationality: (Cuba) Cuban
- Born: Yordanis Despaigne Herrera; February 12, 1980 (age 46)
- Weight: Light Heavyweight

Boxing career

Boxing record
- Total fights: 11
- Wins: 9
- Win by KO: 4
- Losses: 2
- Draws: 0
Medal record
Men's boxing
Representing Cuba
World Amateur Championships
Bronze medal – third place	2001 Belfast	Middleweight
Bronze medal – third place	2003 Bangkok	Middleweight
Pan American Games
Silver medal – second place	2003 Santo Domingo	Middleweight
Central American and Caribbean Games
Gold medal – first place	2006 Cartagena	Middleweight
World Cup
Silver medal – second place	2005 Moscow	Middleweight

Yordanis Despaigne Herrera (born February 12, 1980) is a Cuban professional boxer who, as an amateur boxer, has medaled repeatedly in international tournaments as a middleweight.

== Career ==
In Belfast at the 2001 World Amateur Boxing Championships he won a bronze medal. After beating Kenneth Egan he lost to Utkirbek Haydarov (UZB) 28–29.

In Bangkok 2003 he easily beat Haydarov 33:13 but lost to eventual winner Gennady Golovkin 26:29 and got another Bronze.

At the PanAm Games 2003 he edged out American southpaw Andre Dirrell 21:20 but was upset in the final by Dominican Juan Ubaldo.

At the Olympics 2004 he beat Haitian-Canadian Jean Pascal and Hungarian Károly Balzsay but lost 11:12 against Andre Dirrell.

2005 he lost in an early round at the national championships but in 2006 he beat the young champion Emilio Correa and regained the Cuban championships. He also won the 2006 Central American and Caribbean Games beating among others Argenis Casimiro Núñez in the first round.

Despaigne moved up a division and reached the final of the national championships 2008 where he was upset by 18-year-old Julio Cesar La Cruz from Camagüey.

=== World Cup ===
- 2005 in Moscow, Russia (middleweight)
  - Defeated Suriya Prasathinphimai (Thailand) 28–11
  - Defeated Ronald Gavril (Romania) RSC-3
  - Lost to Gennady Golovkin (Kazakhstan) 37–40
  - Lost to Matvey Korobov (Russia) 39–53

== Professional career ==
Despaigne defected to the United States along with fellow celebrated Cuban boxers Guillermo Rigondeaux and Yudel Johnson in the spring of 2009 and made his professional debut on May 22, 2009.
