= Bisbal =

Bisbal is a Puerto Rican surname. Notable people with the surname include:

- Carlos Gallisá Bisbal (1933–2018), Puerto Rican attorney, politician
- David Bisbal (born 1979), Spanish singer, songwriter, and actor
- Eugenio Bisbal (1882–Unknown), Spanish footballer
- Gerardo Bisbal (born 1984), Puerto Rican boxer
- Victor Bisbal (born 1980), Puerto Rican boxer
