= Shawn Cox =

Barbadian boxer

Personal information
- Full name: Shawn Terry Cox
- Nickname: The Sniper
- Nationality: Barbadian
- Born: December 26, 1974 (age 51)
- Height: 1.84 m (6 ft 0 in)
- Weight: 81 kg (179 lb)

Sport
- Sport: Boxing
- Weight class: Cruiserweight
Medal record
Central American and Caribbean Games
Gold medal – first place	2002 San Salvador	Light Heavyweight
Silver medal – second place	2006 Cartagena	Light heavyweight
Bronze medal – third place	1998 Maracaibo	Light heavyweight

Shawn Terry Cox (born December 26, 1974) is a Barbadian former professional boxer who competed from 2007 to 2015. As an amateur, he competed at the 2000 Summer Olympics and a gold medal at the 2002 Central American and Caribbean Games at light heavyweight. As a professional, he challenged once for the WBA world cruiserweight title in 2012.

== Amateur career ==
1.84/6'0' southpaw Cox competed at the 2000 Summer Olympics in Sydney but ran right into one of the favorites in Frenchman John Dovi and lost 10:14. He also represented Barbados at the Commonwealth Games in 1998, 2002 and 2006 and at the Pan American Games in 1999, 2003 and 2007.

He won the 2002 Caribbean Games defeating Ramiro Reducindo (15:14), benefitting from the absence of Cuban boxers. At the 2006 Central American Games he reached the final where he lost to Cuba's Yusiel Napoles.

== Professional career ==
He turned pro as a cruiser at the age of 32. He beat 16 of his first 17 opponents; the loss was on points to an undefeated Italian. Then he knocked out ex-champ Wayne Braithwaite in round 1. After this career win, he fell to his vulnerable chin and age and lost four of his next five bouts within the first three rounds.

== Professional boxing record ==
18 Wins (17 knockouts, 1 decision), 6 Losses (5 knockout, 1 decision)
Result	Record	Opponent	Type	Round	Date	Location	Notes
Loss	18-7-0	(Poland) Michał Cieślak	KO	1	26/09/2015	(Poland) Atlas Arena, Łódź	
Loss	18-6-0	(China) Zhang Junlong	TKO	2	29/05/2015	Beijing, China	
Win	18-5-0	(Colombia) Santander Silgado	TKO	3	19/12/2014	(Colombia) Coliseo Farid Arana Delgadillo, Magangue	
Loss	17-5-0	(Colombia) Oscar Rivas	TKO	3	18/01/2014	(Canada) Bell Centre, Montreal, Quebec	
Loss	17-4-0	(Russia) Dmitry Kudryashov	KO	2	26/10/2013	(Russia) Express, Rostov-na-Donu	For GBU cruiserweight title
Loss	17-3-0	(South Africa) Danie Venter	KO	1	21/09/2013	(South Africa) Heartfelt Arena, Thaba Tshwane, Pretoria, Gauteng	For WBF cruiserweight title
Win	17-2-0	(Guyana) Kwesi Jones	TKO	4	24/02/2013	(Guyana) Cliff Anderson Sports Hall, Georgetown	
Loss	16-2-0	(Russia) Denis Lebedev	KO	2	04/04/2012	(Russia) Crocus City Hall, Myakinino	For WBA cruiserweight title
Win	16-1-0	(Guyana) Wayne Braithwaite	KO	1	25/02/2012	Cliff Anderson Sports Hall, Georgetown, Guyana	WBC CABOFE Heavyweight Title
Win	15-1-0	(Guyana) Kurt Bess	TKO	1	17/12/2011	Cliff Anderson Sports Hall, Georgetown, Guyana	WBC CABOFE Heavyweight Title
Win	14-1-0	(Puerto Rico) Francisco Alvarez Ramos	TKO	3	02/04/2011	(Mexico) Playa Mamita's, Playa del Carmen, Quintana Roo	
Win	13-1-0	(Jamaica) Carlton Shane Bayley	TKO	1	12/02/2011	(Trinidad and Tobago) Jean Pierre Sports Complex, Port of Spain	
Win	12-1-0	(Guyana) Anthony Agustin	TKO	1	29/10/2010	Cliff Anderson Sports Hall, Georgetown, Guyana	
Win	11-1-0	(Guyana) Leon Gilkes	UD	4	24/09/2010	Cliff Anderson Sports Hall, Georgetown, Guyana	
Win	10-1-0	(Barbados) Curtis Murray	TKO	2	24/04/2010	(Trinidad and Tobago) Central Indoor Regional Auditorium, Chaguanas	
Loss	9-1-0	(Italy) Salvatore Erittu	UD	12	11/12/2009	(Italy) Palasport, Porto Torres, Sardinia	For IBO Mediterranean cruiserweight title
Win	9-0-0	(Barbados) Ricardo Kellman	TKO	2	18/09/2009	(Barbados) Copper Sands, Saint Lawrence Gap	
Win	8-0-0	(Saint Lucia) Patrick "The Destroyer" Wilson	TKO	2	22/05/2009	George Street Auditorium, Saint Michael, Barbados	
Win	7-0-0	(Guyana) Clyde Williams	KO	1	26/12/2008	(Trinidad and Tobago) Jean Pierre Sports Complex, Mucurapo	
Win	6-0-0	(Saint Lucia) Tadius Francis	KO	1	28/11/2008	(Saint Lucia) Gaiety Theatre, Rodney Bay	
Win	5-0-0	(Barbados) Ricardo Kellman	TKO	1	01/06/2008	Garfield Sobers Gymnasium, Wildey, Barbados	Win WBC CABOFE cruiserweight title
Win	4-0-0	(Guyana) Leon Gilkes	TKO	2	29/03/2008	(Trinidad and Tobago) Dr. João Havelange Centre of Excellence	
Win	3-0-0	(Guyana) Mark Sealy	TKO	1	23/12/2007	Garfield Sobers Gymnasium, Wildey, Barbados	
Win	2-0-0	(Guyana) Winston Pompey	RTD	2	30/11/2007	(Trinidad and Tobago) Jean Pierre Sports Complex	
Win	1-0-0	(Barbados) Julian Tannis	TKO	1	23/09/2007	(Barbados) Tim's On De Hiway, Bridgetown	
