= Ramiro Reducindo =

Mexican boxer

Personal information
- Full name: Ramiro Goben Reducindo Radilla
- Nationality: Mexico
- Born: February 10, 1979 (age 47) La Paz, Baja California Sur
- Height: 1.90 m (6 ft 3 in)
- Weight: 81 kg (179 lb)

Sport
- Sport: Boxing
- Weight class: Light Heavyweight
Medal record
Pan American Games
Gold medal – first place	2003 Santo Domingo	Light Heavyweight
Central American and Caribbean Games
Silver medal – second place	2002 San Salvador	Light Heavyweight

Ramiro Goben Reducindo Radilla (born 10 February 1979) is a Mexican and former professional boxer who competed from 2005 to 2010. As an amateur, he won a gold medal at the 2003 Pan American Games and competed at the 2004 Summer Olympics.

== Amateur career ==
At the 2002 Central American and Caribbean he lost the final to southpaw Shawn Terry Cox from Barbados and won silver.

At the 2003 Pan American Games in Santo Domingo he upset Cuban southpaw Yoan Pablo Hernandez to win gold at light heavyweight.

He participated in the 2004 Summer Olympics for his native country. There he was beaten in the first round of the light heavyweight division by Belarus' eventual runner-up Magomed Aripgadjiev.

== Professional career ==
Reducindo turned pro in the cruiserweight and won his first eight bouts before getting KOd twice, once by Eric Fields.

== Professional boxing record ==
13 Wins (8 knockouts, 5 decisions), 4 Losses (4 knockouts, 0 decisions)
Result	Record	Opponent	Type	Round	Date	Location	Notes
Loss	51-15	(Mexico) Saul Montana	KO	1	30/07/2010	La Paz, Mexico	Mexico Heavyweight Title. Ramiro knocked out at 0:48 of the first round.
Loss	20-1	(France) Johann Duhaupas	KO	1	05/12/2009	Abbeville, France	Ramiro knocked out at 0:58 of the first round.
Win	5-4-2	(Mexico) Wilfrido Leal	KO	5	30/05/2009	La Paz, Mexico	Leal knocked out at 0:10 of the fifth round.
Win	--	(Mexico) Luis García	TKO	1	14/03/2009	La Paz, Mexico	
Win	9-3-1	(Mexico) Felipe Romero	UD	10	13/09/2008	La Paz, Mexico	
Win	--	(Mexico) Roberto Ramirez	TKO	2	14/06/2008	La Paz, Mexico	
Win	8-1-1	(Mexico) Felipe Romero	SD	12	28/09/2007	La Paz, Mexico	Mexico Cruiserweight Title.
Loss	6-0	(United States) Eric Fields	KO	1	27/07/2007	(United States) Corona, California, U.S.	Ramiro knocked out at 1:39 of the first round.
Loss	6-1-1	(Mexico) Felipe Romero	KO	7	26/05/2007	Guerrero Negro, Mexico	Mexico Cruiserweight Title.
Win	17-26-3	(Mexico) Eduardo Ayala	TKO	7	16/03/2007	La Paz, Mexico	Mexico Cruiserweight Title.
Win	1-6	(Mexico) José Cruz Rivas	RTD	11	01/12/2006	La Paz, Mexico	Mexico Cruiserweight Title. Rivas retired at 0:10 of the 11th round.
Win	6-2	(United States) Derek Andrews	UD	6	20/07/2006	(United States) Los Angeles, California, U.S.	
Win	2-1	(Mexico) José Silva	KO	1	31/03/2006	La Paz, Mexico	
Win	9-0-1	(Mexico) Daniel Cota Peinado	TKO	8	29/10/2005	La Paz, Mexico	
Win	2-5-3	(Uganda) Moses Matovu	UD	4	14/07/2005	La Paz, Mexico	
Win	0-2	(Mexico) Javier Castillo	KO	1	14/05/2005	La Paz, Mexico	
Win	3-3-1	(United States) Gabriel Taylor	UD	4	10/03/2005	(United States) San Antonio, Texas, U.S.	
