= List of U.S. national Golden Gloves heavyweight champions =

This is a list of United States national Golden Gloves champions in the heavyweight division, along with the state or region they represented. There was originally no weight limit for heavyweights until 1982, when the super heavyweight division was established and heavyweights were limited to 200 lb (91 kg). In 2000, the heavyweight limit was raised to 201 lb, with super heavyweights competing above that.

- 1929: George Meyer – Chicago
- 1930: Grant Fortney – Chicago
- 1931: John Long – Gary
- 1932: Adam Smith – Rockford
- 1933: John Pecek – Chicago
- 1934: Otis Thomas – Chicago
- 1935: Lorenzo Peck – Detroit
- 1936: Paul Hartnek – Omaha
- 1937: Paul Hartnek – Omaha
- 1938: Dan Meritt – Cleveland
- 1939: Tony Novak – Kansas City
- 1940: Cornelius Young – Chicago
- 1941: Allen Aubrey – Cleveland
- 1942: Hubert Hood – Chicago
- 1943: Walter Moore – Chicago
- 1944: Orland Ott – Fort Worth
- 1945: Luke Baylark – Chicago
- 1946: Joe Frucci – Gary
- 1947: Richard Hagan – Chicago
- 1948: Clarence Henry – Los Angeles
- 1949: Don Perko – Denver
- 1950: Earl Sudduth – Rockford
- 1951: Ernest Fann – Cleveland
- 1952: Ed Sanders – Los Angeles
- 1953: Sonny Liston – St. Louis
- 1954: Garvin Sawyer – Cincinnati
- 1955: Eddie Catoe – Kansas City
- 1956: Solomon McTier – Montgomery
- 1957: Joe Hemphel – Rockford
- 1958: Dan Hodge – Wichita
- 1959: Jimmy Jones – Chicago
- 1960: Cassius Clay – Louisville
- 1961: Al Jenkins – Green Bay
- 1962: Bennie Black – Chicago
- 1963: Harley Cooper – Omaha
- 1964: Wyce Westbrook – Cincinnati
- 1965: Jerry Quarry – Los Angeles
- 1966: Clay Hodges – Los Angeles
- 1967: Clay Hodges – Los Angeles
- 1968: Albert Wilson – Charlotte
- 1969: Walter Moore – Los Angeles
- 1970: William Thompson – Chicago
- 1971: Ronald Draper – Kansas City
- 1972: Duane Bobick – Minneapolis
- 1973: Johnny Hudson – Detroit
- 1974: Emory Chapman – Las Vegas
- 1975: Emory Chapman – Las Vegas
- 1976: Michael Dokes – Cleveland
- 1977: James Clark – Pennsylvania
- 1978: Greg Page – Louisville
- 1979: Marvis Frazier – Pennsylvania
- 1980: Michael Arms – Milwaukee
- 1981: Joe Thomas – Pennsylvania
- 1982: Earl Lewis – Cleveland
- 1983: Olian Alexander – Kansas
- 1984: Mike Tyson – New York
- 1985: Jerry Goff – Jackson
- 1986: Orlin Norris – Fort Worth
- 1987: Dave Sherbrooke – Upper Midwest
- 1988: Derek Isaman – Huntington
- 1989: Boris Powell – St. Louis
- 1990: Gregory Suttington – Kansas City
- 1991: Melvin Foster – Washington, DC
- 1992: Robert Summers – Chicago
- 1993: Fres Oquendo – Chicago
- 1994: Nate Jones – Chicago
- 1995: Nate Jones – Illinois
- 1996: DaVarryl Williamson – Milwaukee
- 1997: Jeremiah Muhammad – Mid-South
- 1998: Calvin Brock – Knoxville
- 1999: DaVarryl Williamson – Colorado
- 2000: Devin Vargas – Toledo
- 2001: Devin Vargas – Toledo
- 2002: Matthew Godfrey – New England
- 2003: Blake E. Cruz- Colorado
- 2004: Chazz Witherspoon – Pennsylvania
- 2005: Eric Fields – Mid-South
- 2006: Eric Fields – Oklahoma
- 2007: Deontay Wilder – Knoxville
- 2008: Craig Lewis – Detroit, Michigan
- 2009: Jordan Shimmell – Hudsonville, MI
- 2010: Steve Geffrard - Boca Raton, FL
- 2011: Denzel Jefferson (SP) – Richmond, Va
- 2012: Joseph Mack Williams – Queens, New York
- 2013: Earl Newman (SP) – Brooklyn, New York
- 2014: DeRae Crane – Houston
- 2015: Mike Hilton – New Jersey
- 2016: Jakob Rose – Tucson, Arizona
- 2017: Cam F. Awesome – Kansas City
- 2018: Darius Fulghum - Texas
- 2019: Den Tati Mackaya - Texas
- 2021: Jkhory Gibson - Texas
- 2022: Elijah Akana - Hawai’i
- 2023: Malachi Georges - New Jersey
