= Boxing at the 2002 Central American and Caribbean Games =

- Location: San Salvador
- Dates: 29 November-6 December

The Boxing Tournament at the 2002 Central American and Caribbean Games was held in San Salvador, El Salvador from November 29 to December 6.

== Medal winners ==
| Event | Gold | Silver | Bronze |
|---|---|---|---|
| Light Flyweight (– 48 kilograms) | Joseph Serrano; Puerto Rico | Raúl Castañeda; Mexico | Ronald de la Rosa; Dominican Republic Carlos Luis Campos; Venezuela |
| Flyweight (– 51 kilograms) | Jean Pérez; Venezuela | Carlos Valcárcel; Puerto Rico | Castulo Gonzalez; Guatemala Israel Reyes; Mexico |
| Bantamweight (– 54 kilograms) | Abner Mares; Mexico | Yonnhy Pérez; Colombia | Juan Lopez; Puerto Rico Alexander Espinoza; Venezuela |
| Featherweight (– 57 kilograms) | Elio Rojas; Dominican Republic | Likar Ramos Concha; Colombia | Paul Lewis; Guyana Nehomar Cermeño; Venezuela |
| Lightweight (– 60 kilograms) | Felix Díaz; Dominican Republic | Alexander de Jesus; Puerto Rico | Eddy Monzón; Guatemala Jesús González; Mexico |
| Light Welterweight (– 63.5 kilograms) | Patrick López; Venezuela | CarlosTorres; El Salvador | Isidro Mosquea; Dominican Republic Gregory Michel; Haiti |
| Welterweight (– 67 kilograms) | Euris González; Dominican Republic | Norberto González; Mexico | José Morales; Puerto Rico Tsetsi Davis; Jamaica |
| Light Middleweight (– 71 kilograms) | Juan Camilo Novoa; Colombia | Juan Ubaldo; Dominican Republic | Alfredo Angulo; Mexico Junior Greenidge; Barbados |
| Middleweight (– 75 kilograms) | Alexander Brand; Colombia | Guillermo Reyes; Dominican Republic | Marco Periban; Mexico Wualfredo Rivero; Venezuela |
| Light Heavyweight (– 81 kilograms) | Shawn Terry Cox; Barbados | Ramiro Reducindo; Mexico | Denzil Salazar; Trinidad & Tobago Gerardo Bisbal; Puerto Rico |
| Heavyweight (– 91 kilograms) | Victor Bisbal; Puerto Rico | Kertson Manswell; Trinidad & Tobago | Francisco Garcia; Dominican Republic Elibert Cova; Venezuela |

== See also ==
- Boxing at the 2003 Pan American Games
