= Wayne Braithwaite =

Guyanese boxer

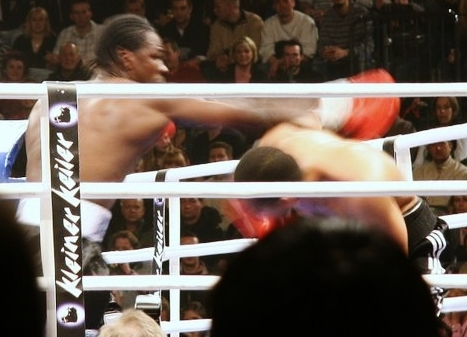
- Braithwaite (left) vs. Hernández, 2008

Personal information
- Nickname: Big Truck
- Nationality: Guyanese
- Born: August 9, 1975 (age 50) Georgetown, Guyana
- Height: 6 ft (183 cm) 1
- Weight: Cruiserweight

Boxing career
- Stance: Southpaw

Boxing record
- Total fights: 30
- Wins: 24
- Win by KO: 20
- Losses: 6

Wayne "Big Truck" Braithwaite (born August 9, 1975) is a Guyanese former professional boxer who competed from 1997 to 2012, and held the WBC cruiserweight title from 2002 to 2005.

== Professional career ==
The highlight of his early amateur career was winning a gold medal at the 1994 Junior Pan American boxing championships held in Venezuela. He also won gold in the junior middleweight division at the Novices boxing championships then a gold medal at the Goodwill Games in Barbados before going professional.

Braithwaite turned professional in 1996, winning with a KO over Olympian John Douglas. For only his tenth fight, in 2000, he was pitted against Dale Brown, who had two years' more professional experience. Braithwaite stopped Brown in eight rounds, winning the WBC–NABF International cruiserweight titles. In 2002, Braithwaite received his first opportunity at a world championship when he faced Vincenzo Cantatore for the WBC cruiserweight title. Fighting in Cantatore's native Italy, Braithwaite was able to weather several onslaughts by his opponent, as well as questionable calls by the referee, en route to a tenth-round stoppage victory. This made Braithwaite only the second boxer from Guyana to win a world title. He successfully defended the title three times, reaching the rank of world's #1 cruiserweight by The Ring magazine during 2003–05.

Braithwaite's undefeated run and title reign came to an end in 2005 when he lost to Jean Marc Mormeck via unanimous decision. The bout was a unification for both the WBC and WBA (Super) cruiserweight titles. The early portion of the fight was dominated by Braithwaite, but Mormeck was able to regain lost ground and win the decision. In Braithwaite's next outing in the same year, he was stopped in four rounds by Guillermo Jones. In 2007, Braithwaite lost to Enzo Maccarinelli in a failed challenge for the WBO cruiserweight title, in which Maccarinelli won a dominant unanimous decision.

A momentary career resurgence for Braithwaite in 2008 saw him upset then-undefeated and future unified cruiserweight world champion Yoan Pablo Hernández, stopping him in three rounds and earning him a WBA and WBC regional title each. Braithwaite was unable to sustain this form in his next fight the following year, losing a unanimous decision to multiple cruiserweight champion Steve Cunningham. Amid a period of sparse activity, consisting of a lone win and two consecutive losses, Braithwaite has not fought since 2012.

== Professional boxing record ==
30 fights	24 wins	6 losses
By knockout	20	2
By decision	4	4

No.	Result	Record	Opponent	Type	Round, time	Date	Location	Notes
30	Loss	24–6	Shawn Corbin	UD	12	Oct 26, 2012	Cliff Anderson Sports Hall, Georgetown, Guyana	For vacant WBC–CABOFE cruiserweight title
29	Loss	24–5	Shawn Cox	KO	1 (12)	Feb 25, 2012	Cliff Anderson Sports Hall, Georgetown, Guyana	For vacant WBC–CABOFE heavyweight title
28	Win	24–4	Adam Harris	TKO	1 (8), 2:59	Mar 6, 2010	Mohegan Sun Arena, Montville, Connecticut, U.S.	
27	Loss	23–4	Steve Cunningham	UD	12	Jul 11, 2009	BankAtlantic Center, Sunrise, Florida, U.S.	
26	Win	23–3	Yoan Pablo Hernández	TKO	3 (12), 1:52	Mar 29, 2008	Sparkassen-Arena, Kiel, Germany	Won WBA Fedelatin and WBC Latino cruiserweight titles
25	Loss	22–3	Enzo Maccarinelli	UD	12	Jul 21, 2007	International Arena, Cardiff, Wales	For WBO cruiserweight title
24	Win	22–2	Gustavo Enriquez	TKO	7 (8), 2:46	Feb 3, 2007	Silver Spurs Arena, Kissimmee, Florida, U.S.	
23	Loss	21–2	Guillermo Jones	TKO	4 (12), 2:26	Sep 3, 2005	Gund Arena, Cleveland, Ohio, U.S.	For WBA Fedelatin and WBC Latino cruiserweight titles
22	Loss	21–1	Jean-Marc Mormeck	UD	12	Apr 2, 2005	DCU Center, Worcester, Massachusetts, U.S.	Lost WBC cruiserweight title; For WBA (Super) and vacant The Ring cruiserweight titles
21	Win	21–0	Louis Azille	UD	12	Apr 17, 2004	Madison Square Garden, New York City, New York, U.S.	Retained WBC cruiserweight title
20	Win	20–0	Luis Andres Pineda	TKO	1 (12), 1:27	Dec 13, 2003	Boardwalk Hall, Atlantic City, New Jersey, U.S.	Retained WBC cruiserweight title
19	Win	19–0	Ravea Springs	TKO	4 (12), 2:40	Feb 21, 2003	Miccosukee Resort & Gaming, Miami, Florida, U.S.	Retained WBC cruiserweight title
18	Win	18–0	Vincenzo Cantatore	TKO	10 (12), 2:06	Oct 11, 2002	Campione d'Italia, Italy	Won vacant WBC cruiserweight title
17	Win	17–0	Louis Azille	KO	3 (12), 2:09	Nov 17, 2001	Mandalay Bay Events Center, Paradise, Nevada, U.S.	
16	Win	16–0	Matthew Charleston	TKO	2 (8)	May 31, 2001	Zembo Shrine Building, Harrisburg, Pennsylvania, U.S.	
15	Win	15–0	Wesley Martin	TKO	3 (8), 1:58	Feb 3, 2001	Mandalay Bay Events Center, Paradise, Nevada, U.S.	
14	Win	14–0	Michael Augine	TKO	2	May 21, 2000	Port-of-Spain, Trinidad and Tobago	
13	Win	13–0	Richard Woodhall	TKO	2	May 3, 2000	Port-of-Spain, Trinidad and Tobago	
12	Win	12–0	David McMillan	KO	4	Apr 15, 2000	Port-of-Spain, Trinidad and Tobago	
11	Win	11–0	Dale Brown	TKO	8 (12), 1:44	Feb 12, 2000	Mohegan Sun Arena, Montville, Connecticut, U.S.	Retained WBC International cruiserweight title; Won NABF cruiserweight title
10	Win	10–0	Ken Sharpe	TKO	3	Dec 27, 1999	Port-of-Spain, Trinidad and Tobago	
9	Win	9–0	Clint Regis	KO	2	Oct 3, 1999	Port-of-Spain, Trinidad and Tobago	
8	Win	8–0	Tosca Petridis	TKO	2 (12)	Jul 29, 1999	Town Hall, Melbourne, Australia	Won vacant WBC International cruiserweight title
7	Win	7–0	Adam Watt	KO	1 (12), 2:37	Mar 15, 1999	Star City Casino, Sydney, Australia	Won vacant WBB cruiserweight title
6	Win	6–0	Wayne Harris	TKO	7 (12)	Jul 25, 1998	Cliff Anderson Sports Hall, Georgetown, Guyana	Won vacant Guyanese light heavyweight title
5	Win	5–0	Ken Sharpe	PTS	8	Oct 11, 1997	Georgetown, Guyana	
4	Win	4–0	Ken Sharpe	PTS	8	Jul 6, 1997	Georgetown, Guyana	
3	Win	3–0	Rene Janvier	TKO	1	May 10, 1997	Fort-de-France, Martinique	
2	Win	2–0	John Lennox Lewis	PTS	4	Mar 16, 1997	Georgetown, Guyana	
1	Win	1–0	John Douglas	TKO	4 (4)	Feb 28, 1997	Georgetown, Guyana	

Sporting positions
Regional boxing titles
Vacant Title last held by Charles Crawford	Guyanese light heavyweight champion July 25, 1998 – March 1999; Vacated	Vacant Title next held by Kwesi Jones
Vacant Title last held by Vassiliy Jirov	WBC International cruiserweight champion July 29, 1999 – December 2000; Vacated	Vacant Title next held by Vincenzo Cantatore
Preceded by Dale Brown	NABF cruiserweight champion February 12, 2000 – January 2001; Vacated	Vacant Title next held by O'Neil Bell
Preceded by Yoan Pablo Hernández	WBA Fedelatin cruiserweight champion March 29, 2008 – September 2008; Vacated	Vacant Title next held by Francisco Palacios
Preceded by Yoan Pablo Hernández	WBC Latino cruiserweight champion March 29, 2008 – July 2009; Vacated	Vacant Title next held by Éric Molina
Minor world boxing titles
Vacant Title last held by Ezequiel Paixão	World Boxing Board cruiserweight champion March 15, 1999 – July 1999; Vacated	Vacant Title next held by Troy Weaver
Major world boxing titles
Vacant Title last held by Juan Carlos Gómez	WBC cruiserweight champion October 11, 2002 – April 2, 2005	Succeeded by Jean-Marc Mormeck
