= Alexander Brand =

Colombian boxer (born 1977)

Alexander Brand Monsalve
Personal information
- Full name: Alexander Brand Monsalve
- Nickname: Cachaco
- Nationality: Colombia
- Born: January 31, 1977 (age 49) Bogotá, Colombia
- Weight: 75 kg (165 lb)

Sport
- Sport: Boxing
- Weight class: Middleweight, Super Middleweight, Light Heavyweight
- Club: Salitre Boxing Gym
Medal record
Pan American Games
Bronze medal – third place	2003 Santo Domingo	Middleweight
Central American and Caribbean Games
Gold medal – first place	2002 San Salvador	Middleweight
Bronze medal – third place	2006 Cartagena	Middleweight

Alexander Brand (born January 31, 1977) is a male boxer from Colombia, who participated in the 2003 Pan American Games for his native country, where he reached the semi-finals, and in 2015, Brand defeated Bernard Donfack in dominant fashion to win the WBF world super middleweight title – a minor championship belt that is unrecognized by the International Boxing Hall of Fame.

== Professional boxing record ==
27 fights, 25 wins (19 knockouts), 2 losses, 0 draws
No.	Result	Record	Opponent	Type	Rd., Time	Date	Location	Notes
27	Loss	25–2	(United States) Andre Ward	UD	12	06 Aug 2016	(United States) Oracle Arena, Oakland, California	For vacant WBO International light heavyweight title
26	Win	25–1	(Russia) Medzhid Bektemirov	SD	12	05 Dec 2015	Osceola Heritage Center, Kissimmee, Florida, United States	
25	Win	24–1	(Germany) Bernard Donfack	UD	12	09 Aug 2015	Palacio de los Deportes, Bogotá, Colombia	
24	Win	23–1	(Colombia) Rey Recio	TKO	7 (8), 2:33	19 Sep 2014	Gimnasio del Sur, Bogotá, Colombia	
23	Win	22–1	(Dominican Republic) Wilmer Mejia	KO	3 (10), 2:55	01 Nov 2013	Coliseo Bernardo Caraballo, Cartagena, Colombia	
22	Win	21–1	(Uruguay) Jorge Rodriguez Olivera	RTD	11 (12)	07 Aug 2013	Palacio de los Deportes, Bogotá, Colombia	
21	Win	20–1	(Colombia) Orlando de Jesus Estrada	TKO	2 (10), 2:00	06 Jul 2013	Coliseo El Salitre, Bogotá, Colombia	
20	Win	19–1	(South Africa) William Gare	UD	12	19 Oct 2012	Coliseo Bernardo Caraballo, Cartagena, Colombia	
19	Win	18–1	(Argentina) Ruben Eduardo Acosta	UD	10	19 Jul 2012	Coliseo Bernardo Caraballo, Cartagena, Colombia	
18	Loss	17–1	(Sweden) Badou Jack	SD	8	11 May 2012	Texas Station Casino, Las Vegas, Nevada, United States	
17	Win	17–0	(Brazil) Luzimar Gonzaga	KO	5 (10), 1:55	30 Mar 2012	Coliseo Bernardo Caraballo, Cartagena, Colombia	
16	Win	16–0	(Mexico) Gerardo Diaz	KO	6 (10), 1:00	03 Feb 2012	Coliseo Bernardo Caraballo, Cartagena, Colombia	
15	Win	15–0	(United States) Terrance Woods	UD	6	20 Nov 2011	Texas Station Casino, Las Vegas, Nevada, United States	
14	Win	14–0	(Colombia) Juan Villadiego	KO	2 (4), 0:54	30 Sep 2011	Coliseo Elias Chegwin, Barranquilla, Colombia	
13	Win	13–0	(Dominican Republic) Frank Mola	UD	6	19 Sep 2011	Polideportvo Eleoncio Mercedes, La Romana, Dominican Republic	
12	Win	12–0	(Colombia) Tomas Orozco Rodriguez	KO	4 (10), 1:25	28 Jan 2011	Centro Recreacional Las Vegas, Barranquilla, Colombia	
11	Win	11–0	(Colombia) Manuel Banquez	TKO	6 (10), 2:31	30 Oct 2010	Centro de Convenciones, Cartagena, Colombia	
10	Win	10–0	(Venezuela) Edwin Mota	KO	5 (12), 1:34	09 Oct 2010	Coliseo de la Universidad Industrial de Santander, Bucaramanga, Colombia	
9	Win	9–0	(Nicaragua) Wilmer Gonzalez	KO	2 (10), 2:57	15 Aug 2010	Coliseo El Salitre, Bogotá, Colombia	
8	Win	8–0	(Colombia) Javier Meza	KO	1 (6), 2:05	25 Jun 2010	Coliseo Cubierto, Puerto Colombia, Colombia	
7	Win	7–0	(Colombia) Enrique Barbosa	KO	1 (6), 1:55	30 Apr 2010	Parque de las Américas, Magangué, Colombia	
6	Win	6–0	(Colombia) Elkin Lopez	TKO	2 (8)	16 Apr 2010	Centro Recreacional Las Vegas, Barranquilla, Colombia	
5	Win	5–0	(Colombia) Clemente Perez	TKO	5 (8)	27 Mar 2010	Barranquilla, Colombia	
4	Win	4–0	(Colombia) Wilmer Enrique Gonzalez	KO	4 (8), 2:27	14 Mar 2010	Gimnasio El Salitre, Bogotá, Colombia	
3	Win	3–0	(Colombia) Leo Cassiani	KO	2 (8), 1:10	27 Jan 2010	Estadio Metropolitano, Barranquilla, Colombia	
2	Win	2–0	(Colombia) Jose Chiquillo	TKO	2 (8)	26 Sep 2009	Centro de Convenciones Gonzalo Jimenez de Quesada, Bogotá, Colombia	
1	Win	1–0	(Colombia) Ignacio Solar	TKO	2 (4)	09 Aug 2009	Parque Simon Bolivar, Bogotá, Colombia	Professional debut.
