= Steve Cunningham =

American boxer

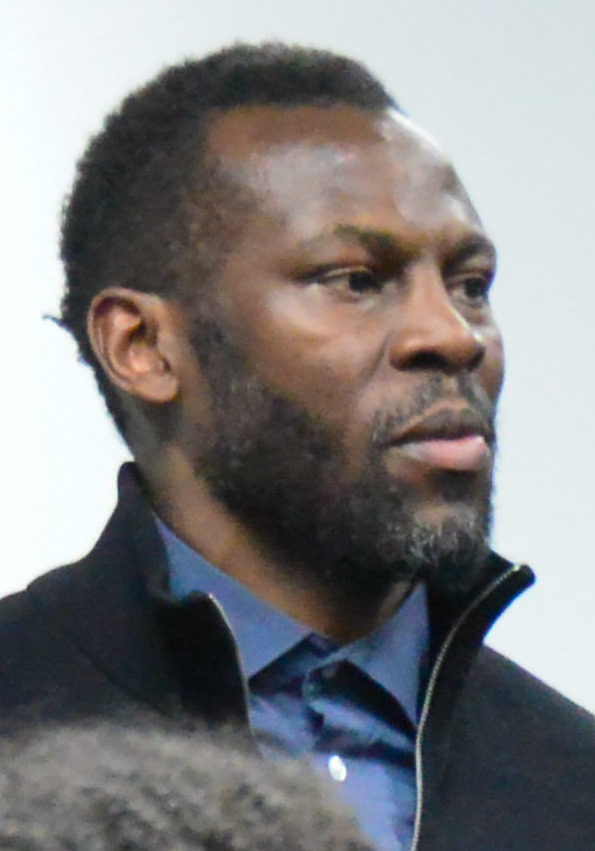
- Cunningham in 2023

Personal information
- Nickname: USS
- Nationality: American
- Born: Steven Ormain Cunningham; July 15, 1976 (age 50) Philadelphia, Pennsylvania, U.S.
- Height: 6 ft 3 in (191 cm)
- Weight: Cruiserweight; Heavyweight

Boxing career
- Reach: 82 in (208 cm)
- Stance: Orthodox

Boxing record
- Total fights: 40
- Wins: 30
- Win by KO: 13
- Losses: 9
- Draws: 1

Steven Ormain Cunningham (born July 15, 1976) is an American professional boxer who held the IBF cruiserweight title twice between 2007 and 2011. His nickname, "USS", is a reference to his US Navy service on the aircraft carriers USS America and USS Enterprise between 1994 and 1998.

== Early life ==
A native of Philadelphia, Cunningham gained a reputation as a tough fighter on the streets of Philly, but he began his amateur career while based at Norfolk Naval Station in Virginia. Cunningham served in the Navy from 1994 to 1998, serving on the aircraft carriers USS America and USS Enterprise.

== Amateur career ==
Cunningham started boxing at the age of 19, and won the National Golden Gloves 178 lb (81 kg) title in 1998 as an amateur.

== Professional career ==
Cunningham began his professional career in 2000 with a 19 fight winning streak including a split decision over Guillermo Jones.

On November 26, 2006, he challenged Krzysztof Włodarczyk for the Vacant IBF Cruiserweight Title but lost by a disputed split decision in front of Wlodarczyk's fans in Warsaw, Mazowieckie, Poland. Later, Cunningham challenged Wlodarczyk again in the summer of 2007. With a majority decision in his favor, Cunningham at last won the title. He stopped undefeated Marco Huck in Germany in December 2007.

Cunningham lost the IBF title against Tomasz Adamek in Newark, New Jersey, on December 11, 2008. He lost the fight via split decision. One judge scored the fight 114–112 for Cunningham, while the other two judges scored it 116–110 and 115–112 for Adamek. Fight was close although Cunningham was knocked down in the second, fourth, and eighth rounds.

Cunningham faced former WBC Cruiserweight Champion Wayne Braithwaite, at the BankAtlantic Center, Sunrise, Florida on the July 11, 2009, and won the fight via a twelve-round unanimous decision 119–109, 117–111, and 118–110. On June 5, 2010, Cunningham regained the IBF Cruiserweight title with a fifth round stoppage on cuts of Troy Ross in Germany. Cunningham returned to Germany to defend his IBF title against challenger Enad Licina on February 12, 2011.

=== Cunningham vs. Fury ===
Cunningham was knocked out in the seventh round by Tyson Fury, a British boxer, in an IBF heavyweight title eliminator on April 20, 2013. Cunningham had the much bigger Fury down in the second round. At the time of the stoppage, Cunningham was winning the fight with 56–56, 57–55, and 57–55. In an interview with Joe Rogan, Fury claimed Cunningham was the toughest opponent of his career.

After being promoted by Kathy Duva and Main Events for several years, he was now advised by Al Haymon. Cunningham was trained by Naazim Richardson.

=== Cunningham vs. Glowacki ===
On April 16, 2016, Cunningham fought Krzysztof Glowacki for his WBO world cruiserweight belt. Glowacki dropped Cunningham four times, twice in the second round, and once in both the tenth and the twelfth round en route to a unanimous decision victory.

=== Cunningham vs. Tabiti ===
On August 26, 2017, Cunningham fought Andrew Tabiti. Tabiti was ranked #4 by the WBC, #9 by the IBF and #12 by the WBA at cruiserweight, while Cunningham was ranked #10 by the IBF at the time. Tabiti won the fight via unanimous decision, 100–90, 97–93 and 97–93.

=== Cunningham vs. Mir ===
Cunningham defeated former UFC Heavyweight Champion Frank Mir by unanimous decision in Mir's boxing debut on April 17, 2021, on the undercard of Jake Paul vs. Ben Askren. Cunningham served as a replacement for Antonio Tarver who was denied clearance by the Georgia Athletic & Entertainment Commission.

== Outside of boxing ==
He joined light-middleweight Boyd Melson, Shawn Estrada, Demetrius Andrade and other boxers in Team Fight to Walk, an organization focused on increasing awareness in boxing of the importance of stem cell research for spinal cord injuries.

Cunningham is a practicing Black Hebrew Israelite.

== Professional boxing record ==
40 fights	30 wins	9 losses
By knockout	13	1
By decision	17	8
Draws	1	

No.	Result	Record	Opponent	Type	Round, time	Date	Location	Notes
40	Win	30–9–1	Frank Mir	UD	6	Apr 17, 2021	Mercedes-Benz Stadium, Atlanta, Georgia, U.S.	
39	Loss	29–9–1	Andrew Tabiti	UD	10	Aug 26, 2017	T-Mobile Arena, Paradise, Nevada, U.S.	For NABF cruiserweight title
38	Win	29–8–1	Felipe Romero	UD	6	Mar 17, 2017	Santander Arena, Reading, Pennsylvania, U.S.	
37	Loss	28–8–1	Krzysztof Głowacki	UD	12	Apr 16, 2016	Barclays Center, New York City, New York, U.S.	For WBO cruiserweight title
36	Draw	28–7–1	Antonio Tarver	SD	12	Aug 14, 2015	Prudential Center, Newark, New Jersey, U.S.	
35	Loss	28–7	Vyacheslav Glazkov	UD	12	Mar 14, 2015	Bell Centre, Montreal, Quebec, Canada	Lost USBA heavyweight title
34	Win	28–6	Natu Visinia	RTD	7 (10), 3:00	Oct 18, 2014	2300 Arena, Philadelphia, Pennsylvania, U.S.	
33	Win	27–6	Amir Mansour	UD	10	Apr 4, 2014	Liacouras Center, Philadelphia, Pennsylvania, U.S.	Won USBA heavyweight title
32	Win	26–6	Manuel Quezada	UD	8	Dec 14, 2013	Resorts Casino Hotel, Atlantic City, New Jersey, U.S.	
31	Loss	25–6	Tyson Fury	KO	7 (12), 2:55	Apr 20, 2013	The Theater at Madison Square Garden, New York City, New York, U.S.	
30	Loss	25–5	Tomasz Adamek	SD	12	Dec 22, 2012	Sands Casino Resort, Bethlehem, Pennsylvania, U.S.	For IBF North American heavyweight title
29	Win	25–4	Jason Gavern	UD	10	Sep 8, 2012	Prudential Center, Newark, New Jersey, U.S.	
28	Loss	24–4	Yoan Pablo Hernández	UD	12	Feb 4, 2012	Fraport Arena, Frankfurt, Germany	For IBF cruiserweight title; For vacant The Ring cruiserweight title
27	Loss	24–3	Yoan Pablo Hernández	TD	6 (12), 3:00	Oct 1, 2011	Jahnsportforum, Neubrandenburg, Germany	Lost IBF cruiserweight title; Split TD after Hernández cut from accidental head clash
26	Win	24–2	Enad Licina	UD	12	Feb 12, 2011	RWE Rhein-Ruhr Sporthalle, Mülheim, Germany	Retained IBF cruiserweight title
25	Win	23–2	Troy Ross	TKO	5 (12), 0:01	Jun 5, 2010	Jahnsportforum, Neubrandenburg, Germany	Won vacant IBF cruiserweight title
24	Win	22–2	Wayne Braithwaite	UD	12	Jul 11, 2009	BankAtlantic Center, Sunrise, Florida, U.S.	
23	Loss	21–2	Tomasz Adamek	SD	12	Dec 11, 2008	Prudential Center, Newark, New Jersey, U.S.	Lost IBF cruiserweight title; For vacant The Ring cruiserweight title
22	Win	21–1	Marco Huck	TKO	12 (12), 1:56	Dec 29, 2007	Seidensticker Halle, Bielefeld, Germany	Retained IBF cruiserweight title
21	Win	20–1	Krzysztof Włodarczyk	MD	12	May 26, 2007	Spodek, Katowice, Poland	Won IBF cruiserweight title
20	Loss	19–1	Krzysztof Włodarczyk	SD	12	Nov 25, 2006	Torwar Hall, Warsaw, Poland	For vacant IBF cruiserweight title
19	Win	19–0	Lloyd Bryan	TKO	5 (10), 1:10	Jan 7, 2006	Madison Square Garden, New York City, New York, U.S.	
18	Win	18–0	Kelvin Davis	UD	12	Sep 3, 2005	Gund Arena, Cleveland, Ohio, U.S.	
17	Win	17–0	Guillermo Jones	SD	10	Apr 2, 2005	DCU Center, Worcester, Massachusetts, U.S.	
16	Win	16–0	Forrest Neal	TKO	4 (8), 0:53	Oct 2, 2004	Madison Square Garden, New York City, New York, U.S.	
15	Win	15–0	Sebastiaan Rothmann	MD	10	May 22, 2004	Carnival City, Brakpan, South Africa	
14	Win	14–0	Terry McGroom	UD	8	Sep 20, 2003	Mohegan Sun Arena, Montville, Connecticut, U.S.	
13	Win	13–0	Demetrius Jenkins	UD	8	Mar 29, 2003	Spectrum, Philadelphia, Pennsylvania, U.S.	
12	Win	12–0	Joseph Awinongya	UD	8	Jul 27, 2002	Mandalay Bay Events Center, Paradise, Nevada, U.S.	
11	Win	11–0	Caseny Truesdale	PTS	4	Sep 29, 2001	Martinsville, Virginia, U.S.	
10	Win	10–0	Shawn Townsend	TKO	3	Aug 30, 2001	Charleston, South Carolina, U.S.	
9	Win	9–0	Shawn Townsend	TKO	6	Jul 26, 2001	Charleston, South Carolina, U.S.	
8	Win	8–0	John Battle	KO	1	Jun 28, 2001	The Plex, Charleston, South Carolina, U.S.	
7	Win	7–0	Mike Williams	TKO	6	May 24, 2001	The Plex, Charleston, South Carolina, U.S.	
6	Win	6–0	Richard Perry	KO	1	May 12, 2001	Johnson City, Tennessee, U.S.	
5	Win	5–0	Jeff Bowman	TKO	1	Apr 28, 2001	Nashville, Tennessee, U.S.	
4	Win	4–0	Kanovas Alexander	KO	1	Apr 12, 2001	Gaillard Municipal Auditorium, Charleston, South Carolina, U.S.	
3	Win	3–0	Nate Frazier	KO	1	Mar 10, 2001	Virginia, U.S.	
2	Win	2–0	Robert Marsh	PTS	4	Feb 17, 2001	Radisson Hotel, Charleston, South Carolina, U.S.	
1	Win	1–0	Norman Jones	SD	4	Oct 28, 2000	Jarrell's Boxing Gym, Savannah, Georgia, U.S.	

Sporting positions
Amateur boxing titles
Previous: BJ Flores	U.S. Golden Gloves light heavyweight champion 1998	Next: Michael Simms
Regional boxing titles
Preceded by Amir Mansour	USBA heavyweight champion April 4, 2014 – March 14, 2015	Succeeded by Vyacheslav Glazkov
World boxing titles
Preceded by Krzysztof Włodarczyk	IBF cruiserweight champion May 26, 2007 – December 11, 2008	Succeeded by Tomasz Adamek
Vacant Title last held by Tomasz Adamek	IBF cruiserweight champion June 5, 2010 – October 1, 2011	Succeeded by Yoan Pablo Hernández
