= Enad Ličina =

Serbian boxer

Personal information
- Born: 14 November 1979 (age 46) Novi Pazar, SR Serbia, SFR Yugoslavia
- Height: 1.83 m (6 ft 0 in)
- Weight: Cruiserweight

Boxing career
- Stance: Southpaw

Boxing record
- Total fights: 31
- Wins: 28
- Win by KO: 17
- Losses: 4
- Draws: 0
- No contests: 0

Enad Ličina (Serbian Cyrillic: Енад Личина; born 14 November 1979) is a Serbian professional boxer of Bosniak origin.

== Professional boxing record ==
28 wins (17 knockouts, 11 decisions), 4 losses (0 knockouts, 4 decisions), 0 draws
Res.	Record	Opponent	Type	Round	Date	Location	Notes
Win	28–4	(Bosnia and Herzegovina) Adil Rusidi	KO	2 (6)	2015-12-27	(Germany) Niedersachsen	
Win	27–4	(Croatia) Josip Jalusic	TKO	1 (6)	2015-12-05	(Germany) Niedersachsen	
Win	26–4	(Poland) Piotr Twardowski	TKO	1 (6)	2015-07-18	(Germany) Weissenthurm	
Win	25–4	(Georgia (country)) Levan Jomardashvili	TKO	3 (8)	2013-09-27	(Turkey) Tekirdağ	
Win	24–4	(Croatia) Marko Rupčić	UD	6	2013-07-27	(Germany) Cuxhaven	
Win	23–4	(Germany) Marcel Zeller	KO	3 (8)	2013-06-15	(Germany) Hattersheim am Main	
Win	22–4	(Germany) Koeksal Orduhan	TKO	2 (6)	2012-11-10	(Germany) Koblenz	
Loss	21–4	(Russia) Aleksandr Alekseyev	UD	12	2012-02-04	(Germany) Frankfurt	For vacant European cruiserweight title
Win	21–3	(Wales) Hari Miles	UD	8	2011-10-22	(Germany) Ludwigsburg	
Win	20–3	(Italy) Michele De Meo	KO	1 (8)	2011-05-07	(Germany) Neubrandenburg	
Loss	19–3	(United States) Steve Cunningham	UD	12	2011-02-12	(Germany) Mülheim	For IBF cruiserweight title
Win	19–2	(United States) Felix Cora Jr.	UD	12	2010-11-13	(United Kingdom) Manchester	
Win	18–2	(Belgium) Ismail Abdoul	UD	8	2010-08-21	(Germany) Erfurt	
Loss	17–2	(Cuba) Yoan Pablo Hernandez	UD	12	2009-10-17	(Germany) Berlin	Lost IBF Inter-Continental cruiserweight title
Win	17–1	(Mexico) Ignacio Esparza	UD	12 (12)	2009-06-27	(Germany) Berlin	Retained IBF Inter-Continental cruiserweight title
Win	16–1	(Colombia) Jose Luis Herrera	TKO	8 (12)	2009-01-24	(Germany) Riesa	Retained IBF Inter-Continental cruiserweight title
Win	15–1	(United States) Otis Griffin	TKO	3 (10)	2008-11-08	(Germany) Bamberg	Won vacant IBF Inter-Continental cruiserweight title
Win	14–1	(United States) DeLeon Tinsley	KO	3 (10)	2008-05-17	(Germany) Bayreuth	
Win	13–1	(United States) Kendrick Releford	UD	8 (8)	2008-03-29	(Germany) Kiel	
Win	12–1	(Czech Republic) Lubos Suda	UD	8	2008-01-26	(Germany) Berlin	
Win	11–1	(United Kingdom) Rob Norton	UD	8	2007-12-08	(Switzerland) Basel	
Win	10–1	(Croatia) Tomislav Jurić Grgić	KO	2 (6)	2007-10-05	(Germany) Marzahn-Hellersdorf	
Win	9–1	(Belgium) Ismail Abdoul	UD	8	2007-09-29	(Germany) Oldenburg	
Win	8–1	(Poland) Łukasz Rusiewicz	TKO	4 (8)	2007-06-23	(Germany) Zwickau	
Win	7–1	(Croatia) Teo Begović	TKO	1 (6)	2007-06-09	(Germany) Eisenhüttenstadt	
Win	6–1	(Belarus) Siarhei Karanevich	UD	6	2007-04-14	(Germany) Stuttgart	
Win	5–1	(Democratic Republic of the Congo) Mayala Mbungi	TKO	4 (6)	2006-03-11	(Germany) Greifswald	
Win	4–1	(Turkey) Bruce Özbek	TKO	1 (6)	2006-02-19	(Germany) Berlin	
Loss	3–1	(Poland) Aleksy Kuziemski	UD	6 (6)	2005-09-20	(Czech Republic) Prague	
Win	3–0	(Germany) Matteo Sciacca	TKO	2 (4)	2005-06-28	(Germany) Cuxhaven	
Win	2–0	(Belarus) Dzianis Solomko	TKO	2 (4)	2005-06-04	(Germany) Aschersleben	
Win	1–0	(Czech Republic) Radek Seman	PTS	4	2005-04-02	(Germany) Velten	
