= Boxing at the 2003 Pan American Games =

The Men's Boxing Tournament at the 2003 Pan American Games was held in the Carlos Teo Cruz Boxing Coliseum in Santo Domingo, Dominican Republic from August 8 to August 15.

It served as a qualification tournament for the 2004 Summer Olympics in Athens, Greece.

== Medal winners ==
Event	Gold	Silver	Bronze
Light Flyweight (– 48 kilograms)	Yan Bartelemí; Cuba	Carlos José Tamara; Colombia	José Jefferson Perez; Venezuela Raúl Castañeda; Mexico
Flyweight (– 51 kilograms)	Yuriorkis Gamboa; Cuba	Juan Carlos Payano; Dominican Republic	Raúl Hirales; Mexico James Pereira; Brazil
Bantamweight (– 54 kilograms)	Guillermo Rigondeaux; Cuba	Abner Mares; Mexico	Andrew Kooner; Canada Yonnhy Perez; Colombia
Featherweight (– 57 kilograms)	Likar Ramos Concha; Colombia	Aaron Garcia; United States	Jhonathan Batista; Dominican Republic Yosvani Aguilera; Cuba
Lightweight (– 60 kilograms)	Mario Kindelán; Cuba	Alex de Jesús; Puerto Rico	Manuel Felix Diaz; Dominican Republic Francisco Javier Vargas; Mexico
Light Welterweight (– 64 kilograms)	Patrick López; Venezuela	Isidro Mosquea; Dominican Republic	Juan de Dios Navarro; Mexico Marcos Costa; Brazil
Welterweight (– 69 kilograms)	Lorenzo Aragón; Cuba	Juan McPherson; United States	Euris González; Dominican Republic Alfredo Angulo; Mexico
Middleweight (– 75 kilograms)	Juan José Ubaldo; Dominican Republic	Yordanis Despaigne; Cuba	Jean Pascal; Canada Alexander Brand; Colombia
Light Heavyweight (– 81 kilograms)	Ramiro Reducindo; Mexico	Yoan Pablo Hernández; Cuba	Juan Carlos Lugo; Venezuela Argenis Casimiro; Dominican Republic
Heavyweight (– 91 kilograms)	Odlanier Solis; Cuba	Kertson Manswell; Trinidad and Tobago	Jason Douglas; Canada Devin Vargas; United States
Super Heavyweight (+ 91 kilograms)	Jason Estrada; United States	Michel López Núñez; Cuba	Sébastian Ceballo; Argentina Victor Bisbal; Puerto Rico

== Medal table ==
Place	Nation	Gold medal	Silver medal	Bronze medal	Total
1	Cuba	6	3	1	10
2	Dominican Republic	1	2	4	7
3	United States	1	2	1	4
4	Mexico	1	1	5	7
5	Colombia	1	1	2	4
6	Venezuela	1	0	2	3
7	Puerto Rico	0	1	1	2
8	Trinidad and Tobago	0	1	0	1
9	Canada	0	0	3	3
10	Brazil	0	0	2	2
11	Argentina	0	0	1	1
Total		11	11	22	44

== Qualified for the 2004 Summer Olympics ==
=== Light flyweight (–48 kg) ===
- Yan Bartelemí (CUB)
- Carlos José Tamara (COL)

=== Flyweight (–51 kg) ===
- Yuriorkis Gamboa (CUB)
- Juan Carlos Payano (DOM)

=== Bantamweight (–54 kg) ===
- Guillermo Rigondeaux (CUB)
- Abner Mares (MEX)

=== Featherweight (–57 kg) ===
- Likar Ramos Concha (COL)
- Aaron Garcia (USA)

=== Lightweight (–60 kg) ===
- Mario Kindelán (CUB)
- Alex de Jesús (PUR)

=== Light welterweight (–64 kg) ===
- Patrick López (VEN)
- Isidro Mosquea (DOM)

=== Welterweight (–69 kg) ===
- Lorenzo Aragón (CUB)
- Juan McPherson (USA)

=== Middleweight (–75 kg) ===
- Juan José Ubaldo (DOM)
- Yordanis Despaigne (CUB)

=== Light heavyweight (–81 kg) ===
- Ramiro Reducindo (MEX)
- Yoan Pablo Hernández (CUB)

=== Heavyweight (–91 kg) ===
- Odlanier Solis (CUB)

=== Super heavyweight (+91 kg) ===
- Jason Estrada (USA)

== See also ==
- Boxing at the 2002 Central American and Caribbean Games
- 1st AIBA American 2004 Olympic Qualifying Tournament
- 2nd AIBA American 2004 Olympic Qualifying Tournament
- Boxing at the 2004 Summer Olympics
