= Kenny Galarza =

Puerto Rican boxer (born 1985)

Personal information
- Nicknames: El Artista del KO, KOGA
- Nationality: Puerto Rico
- Born: Kenny Omar Galarza Arocho; October 16, 1985 (age 40) Ponce, Puerto Rico
- Height: 5 ft 8 in (1.73 m)
- Weight: Light welterweight

Boxing career
- Stance: Orthodox

Boxing record
- Total fights: 18
- Wins: 16
- Win by KO: 15
- Losses: 2
- Draws: 0
- No contests: 0

Kenny Galarza
Medal record

Representing Puerto Rico

Men's Boxing

Junior Olympics Invitational
Gold medal – first place	Mexico	Bantamweight
Gold medal – first place	Louisiana	Lightweight
Silver medal – second place	Michigan	Featherweight

Pan American Boxing Championships
Silver medal – second place	2005 Teresópolis	Light welterweight

Central American and Caribbean Games
Bronze medal – third place	2006 Cartagena	Light welterweight

Kenny Omar Galarza Arocho (born October 16, 1985) is a professional boxer. He competes in the light welterweight division, and represented Puerto Rico at numerous events as an amateur. Galarza won seven national championships locally and earned several recognitions in international competition. These include: two gold medals at the Junior Olympics Invitational, silver at the 2005 Pan American Boxing Championships and bronze in the 2006 Central American and Caribbean Games. Prior to the 2007 Pan American Games, Galarza closed his amateur career, signing with Seminole Warriors Boxing. He debuted defeating Jesse Francisco on May 16, 2007. This victory marked the beginning of a knockout streak, which has lasted for thirteen contests. On September 18, 2009, Galarza won his first professional title, defeating Joshua Allotey to become the first interim light welterweight champion of the North American Boxing Organization. Amassing a perfect record and knockout ratio earned him inclusion in other sanctioning bodies, including the World Boxing Organization (11th), WBO Latino (7th), World Boxing Association's FEDECARIBE (6th) and World Boxing Foundation's International (10th) rankings.

== Personal life ==
Galarza was born in the municipality of Ponce to Israel Galarza and Elizabeth Arocho. He is one of five siblings, composed of one sister, Anette Galarza, and four brothers, including Israel Jr., Arnaldo and Kelvin. Galarza was raised in the practice of Catholicism. The family displays the practice of boxing tradition among its male members. His father is involved in the sport as a trainer. Several of his brothers are involved in the sport; Arnaldo Galarza is an amateur heavyweight, Kelvin Galarza and Israel are professional in the lightweight and featherweight divisions respectively. Galarza learned the basics of the sport in a gym established in Collores, a barrio located in the municipality of Juana Díaz, considering Félix Trinidad his inspiration within the discipline. He also became interested in cockfighting, adopting it as a hobby. After completing his high school education, Galarza earned an Electrical Technician degree.

== Amateur career ==
Galarza won Puerto Rico's national championship on seven different occasions. While competing for Puerto Rico internationally, the pugilist studied in the Metropolitan Recint of the Interamerican University of Puerto Rico. In August 2002, he participated in the Juan Evangelista Venegas Tournament, advancing to the semifinals before losing to Jesús González by points, 18:11. Galarza co-held the competition's bronze medal with Danny Jiménez of Mexico. He participated in the International José "Cheo" Aponte Tournament which began on June 2, 2003. But was unable to advance to the final rounds. Galarza won three different medals at the Junior Olympics Invitational level, gathering gold in the bantamweight (54 kg, 119 lb) and lightweight (60 kg, 132 lb) divisions and silver in the featherweight (57 kg, 125 lb) category. Galarza participated in the 2003 edition of the Torneo Internacional de Boxeo Batalla de Carabobo, winning bronze. In 2005, he lost to Miguel Riveiro of Brazil by points, during the eliminatory stage. In that year's International José "Cheo" Aponte Tournament, Galarza advanced to the semifinals, but lost to Myke Carvalho by points, 14:12. On October 3, 2005, Galarza won the light welterweight (64 kg, 141 lb) silver medal at the Pan American Boxing Championships, only losing to Inocente Fiss by referee technical decision (RTD) in the final. Galarza participated in the 2006 Central American and Caribbean Games, where he debuted defeating Luis E. Grajeda Ozaeta of Mexico by points (8:6) in the 64 kg division. In his second fight, Galarza lost to Yudel Johnson of Cuba by points, 12:9. On the third date, he defeated Kennis Joseph of Grenada by referee stopping contest (RSC) in the second round. This was followed by a rematch against Johnson, who won by points, with a similar score of 12:9. With this performance, Galarza won the tournament’s bronze medal. He was unable to compete in the 2006 Campeonato Nacional Isaac Barriento de Boxeo Aficionado tournament due to an arm injury. Galarza, along twin brothers Carlos and Juan Velázquez, was one of the national team's boxers that decided to become professionals before the 2007 Pan American Games. He closed this stage with a record of 252 wins and 58 losses.

== Professional career ==
=== Early knockout streak ===
Galarza debuted on May 16, 2007, being promoted by Seminole Warriors Boxing and trained by his father and José Bonilla. In his first contest, he fought Jesse Francisco in the welterweight limit, as part of a card held in Hollywood, Florida. After both pugilists scored knockdowns in the first round, Galarza defeated Francisco by technical knockout in the second. His next fight took place in the same venue, it was the first match of the card and he was paired against Carlos Oyola, who was in his debut. After two rounds, Galarza earned his second victory, when the referee stopped the contest. His next fight was against James Sangrey and lasted only one round, after a punch left Sangrey unconscious. This was followed by two technical knockout wins over David Maund and Amaury Torres in the light welterweight division. On June 21, 2008, he scored a knockout victory over Heraclides Barrantes, after scoring two knockdowns in the first round. In the undercard of last 2008 episode of ESPN2's Wednesday Night Fights, Galarza defeated Devarise Crayton by knockout at the 2:57 mark of the second round. He closed the year on November 11, fighting against Sebastian Hamel of Canada. Galarza controlled the offensive throughout the contest, scoring a knockdown in the latter part of the second round. During the intermission, Hamel's corner decided to "throw in the towel". With this action, Galarza was awarded a technical knockout. In December, ESPN.com's boxing writer, Dan Rafael, included Galarza in a list of "future stars". Leonardo Rojas was scheduled to be the opponent for his next fight, which was supposed to take place in Montreal, serving as part of the Juan Urango–Herman Ngoudjo undercard. However, this contest was cancelled due to local rules, which prohibit the organization of fights one hour before midnight. He returned to action on February 28, 2009, competing against Eduardo Adorno. The card was held at the Juan Pachín Vicéns Auditorium in Ponce, marking the first time that Galarza performed in Puerto Rico since becoming a professional. He won the fight, scoring a technical knockout at the 1:59 mark of the first round.

On April 22, 2009, Andrew Eisele of About.com ranked the pugilist in the twentieth place of a list titled "Top 25 Boxing Prospects for 2009 and Beyond", where he compiled boxers that he considered to possess the potential of becoming "the next generation of boxing superstars". Galarza's next fight was against Roberto Acevedo, performing as part of a card titled "Boxeo de Campeones" which was presented by Universal Promotions. Prior to this fight, the negotiations with Acevedo's team stalled and Javier Bustillo, who organized the event, contacted a second rival to fill the vacancy if his offer was refused. The matchup served as the midcard's final contest and was set for a catchweight of 142 pounds. Galarza defeated Acevedo by technical knockout after 2:10 had passed in the seventh round. Subsequently, Universal announced that he would be active on September 18, 2009, performing in the undercard of César Seda Jr. versus Omar Soto. This event marks the inauguration of a coliseum in Juana Díaz, the municipality where Galarza was born and Seda resides. His opponent was Joshua Allotey, with the North American Boxing Organization's interim title being sanctioned during the contest. Originally, Iván Hernández was selected to fight for a different regional championship, but his management withdrew from the negotiations two weeks before the scheduled date. The fight featured exchanges from both pugilists, Galarza used his offensive to weaken Allotey with left hooks and uppercuts, moving the punches towards his opponent's head as the contest advanced. However, Allotey was able to display some resistance to the constant attack. In the tenth round, Galarza pressed the attack forcing a knockdown with a body punch, Allotey recovered after a count of eight, but the referee stopped the fight when he was unresponsive following multiple punches. This victory earned him "Prospect of the Month" accolades from boxing writer, Theodore Sares. To close the year, Doug Fischer of The Ring included the pugilist in his list of "Top prospects to watch in 2010". His first contest of 2010 was scheduled for January 29, fighting against former International Boxing Organization super flyweight champion, Ilido Julio, co-headlining a card held at UIC Pavilion along Donovan George. Galarza scored two knockdowns in the first round and one in the third. Consequently, Julio received a warning from the referee, but continued unresponsive to the offensive, with the fight being stopped by technical knockout between the fourth and fifth stages. His next participation was in a preparatory contest against Miguel Casillas, held on March 12, 2010, as part of ESPN Deportes' Viernes de Combates series. Galarza dominated the first two rounds, using the first to study his opponent before pressuring the offensive as the fight progressed. In the third round, he pinned Casillas to the ropes and connected several consecutive punches, the attack continued without response and the referee stopped the fight by technical knockout at the 1:27 mark.

== Professional championships ==
=== Regional titles ===
Preceded by New title	Interim North American Boxing Organization Light Welterweight Championship; September 18, 2009–present	Succeeded by Incumbent
