= Yoan Pablo Hernández =

Cuban boxer (born 1984)

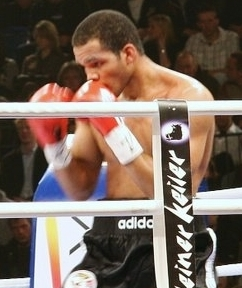
- Hernández vs. Braithwaite, 2008

Personal information
- Nickname: Iron Man
- Nationality: Cuban; German
- Born: Yoan Pablo Hernández Suárez; October 28, 1984 (age 41) Pinar del Río, Cuba
- Height: 6 ft 4 in (193 cm)
- Weight: Cruiserweight

Boxing career
- Reach: 77 in (196 cm)
- Stance: Southpaw

Boxing record
- Total fights: 31
- Wins: 29
- Win by KO: 14
- Losses: 2
Medal record
Men's amateur boxing
Representing Cuba
Pan American Games
Silver medal – second place	2003 Santo Domingo	Light heavyweight
World Junior Championships
Gold medal – first place	2002 Santiago de Cuba	Heavyweight

Yoan Pablo Hernández Suárez (born October 28, 1984) is a Cuban-German former professional boxer who competed between 2005 and 2020. He held the International Boxing Federation (IBF) and the Ring magazine cruiserweight titles between 2011 and 2015. He is the half-brother of Yoel Romero, a freestyle wrestler and mixed martial artist.

== Amateur career ==
Yoan Pablo Hernández started boxing with the Cuban national team at a very young age. He got silver at the Cadet World Championships (under 17) 2001 at 201 lbs/91 kg. He won the heavyweight Junior World Championships in 2002 in Santiago de Cuba but lost twice to countryman Odlanier Solís and was forced to go down in weight. At light heavyweight (178 lbs) in 2003 Hernández won the silver medal at the Pan American Games in Santo Domingo where he lost to Ramiro Reducindo.

He participated in the 2004 Summer Olympics for his native country. There he was defeated in the second round of the light heavyweight (81 kg) division by Russia's Evgeny Makarenko, a double world champion in the event.

Although he was considered one of the top prospects in Cuban boxing, he defected to Germany, and is now based in Berlin, Germany.

=== Amateur highlights ===
- 2001 Cuban junior champion at heavyweight
- World Junior championships as a heavyweight, in competition in Baku, Azerbaijan. Results were:
  - Defeated Dato Dundva (Georgia) points
  - Defeated Rufat Hairbekov (Azerbaijan) points
  - Lost to Siergej Ivanov (Russia) points
- World Junior championships 2002 (heavyweight) in Santiago de Cuba, Cuba. Results were:
  - Defeated Justin White (Canada) RTD 1
  - Defeated Vitaly Mikhyeyenko (Ukraine) 31–11.
  - Defeated Stefan Koeber (Germany) RSC 3
  - Defeated Parfait Amougou (Cameroon) RSC 3. (Captured gold medal)
- Pan American games 2003 (light heavyweight) in Santo Domingo, Dominican Republic
  - Defeated Argenis Casimiro Núñez (Dominican Republic) RSC 4
  - Lost to Ramiro Reducindo (Mexico (20–37) (won silver medal)
- Represented Cuba as a light heavyweight at the 2004 Athens Olympic Games. His results were:
  - 1st round bye:
  - Lost to Evgeny Makarenko (Russia) 18–30
- 2003 knocked out by Odlanier Solís in 3rd round at Cuban amateur heavyweight championship competition.
- 2003 competed as a light heavyweight at 2003 Pan-American Games in Santo Domingo, Dominican Republic. Results were:
  - Defeated Eduardo Beltran (Ecuador) RSC 1
  - Defeated Argenis Casimiro Núñez (Dominican Republic) RSC 4
  - Lost to Ramiro Reducindo (Mexico) 20–37
- 2004 3rd place at Cuban national light heavyweight competition, losing on points to Vladimir Linares Mesquia RSC 4

2005 Cuban national champion (light heavyweight)

== Professional career ==
=== Cruiserweight ===
Hernández was a fast and hard-punching boxer who competed entirely at cruiserweight. Hernández knocked out Daniel Bispo in the first round to win the vacant WBA Fedelatin Cruiserweight Championship. On December 29, 2007, he knocked out world title challenger Mohamed Azzaoui to retain his WBA Fedelatin title and win the vacant WBC Latino title but suffered his first defeat on March 29, 2008 when he lost via 3rd-round TKO to ex-champ Wayne Braithwaite of Guyana after controlling the match for the first two rounds and even knocking Braithwaite down in the 1st round. Hernández got too cocky in the 3rd and decided to shoot it out with him resulting in Braithwaite knocking Hernández down 3 times. He later won a wide decision over prospect Aaron Williams.

On September 19, 2009 Hernández defeated Enad Licina by a wide UD for the IBF Inter-Continental Cruiserweight title, becoming the first Cuban to hold a version of the IBF title since it was created.

On March 13, 2010 Hernández made his first defense of the IBF Inter-Continental title by beating Cesar David Crenz by unanimous decision.

On February 12, 2011 Hernández won the Interim WBA Cruiserweight title by knocking out Steve Herelius. With this latest win he extended his undefeated streak to 10 fights since the defeat to Braithwaite and improved his overall record to 24-1 (13 knockouts).

==== Hernández vs. Cunningham ====
On 1 October 2011, Hernández defeated The Ring No. 1 Cruiserweight, Steve Cunningham, by sixth round technical decision for the IBF Cruiserweight Championship. The fight was stopped due to Hernández being cut by an illegal headbutt, though the fight was not without controversy. Hernández knocked Cunningham down with a counter left hook in the first round and seemed to be badly hurt, but referee Mickey Vann decided to let the fight continue after what seemed like a controversial slow count. Cunningham made a comeback during the second and third rounds, hitting Hernández with body shots in the second and becoming more aggressive during the third. However the latter round was also marred with controversy as Hernández was hit with an accidental headbutt that caused a cut and that many felt was intentional, with referee Vann not stopping the fight or even giving a warning to Cunningham. During the fourth round both fighters seems about equal, with Cunningham controlling the pace with his jab and Hernández successfully landing a combo. During the fifth round, Hernández accidentally hit Cunningham behind the head when referee Vann attempted to break up a clinch. During the sixth and final round the corner of Hernández as well as the ringside physician inspected the cut caused by Cunningham's headbutt. Afterwards Hernández seemed ready to resume with the round when the referee stopped the fight due to the physician deeming Hernández unfit to continue. The score cards were 57–56 for Cunningham and 58–55 and 59–54 for Hernández.

==== Hernández vs. Cunningham II ====
Hernández and Cunningham had a rematch on 4 February 2012. The winner of this fight was to be crowned the new The Ring Cruiserweight Champion. Hernández won via unanimous decision.

== Outside boxing ==
Hernández played the part of Joe Louis in the 2010 German film Max Schmeling.

== Professional boxing record ==
31 fights	29 wins	2 losses
By knockout	14	2
By decision	14	0
By disqualification	1	0

No.	Result	Record	Opponent	Type	Round, time	Date	Location	Notes
31	Loss	29–2	Kevin Johnson	KO	7 (8), 2:04	22 Aug 2020	Seebühne, Magdeburg, Germany	
30	Win	29–1	Firat Arslan	SD	12	16 Aug 2014	Messe, Erfurt, Germany	Retained IBF and The Ring cruiserweight titles
29	Win	28–1	Aleksandr Alekseyev	TKO	10 (12), 1:35	23 Nov 2013	Stechert Arena, Bamberg, Germany	Retained IBF and The Ring cruiserweight titles
28	Win	27–1	Troy Ross	UD	12	15 Sep 2012	Stechert Arena, Bamberg, Germany	Retained IBF and The Ring cruiserweight titles
27	Win	26–1	Steve Cunningham	UD	12	4 Feb 2012	Fraport Arena, Frankfurt, Germany	Retained IBF cruiserweight title; Won vacant The Ring cruiserweight title
26	Win	25–1	Steve Cunningham	TD	6 (12), 3:00	1 Oct 2011	Jahnsportforum, Neubrandenburg, Germany	Won IBF cruiserweight title; Split TD: Hernández cut from an accidental head clash
25	Win	24–1	Steve Hérélius	KO	7 (12), 1:19	12 Feb 2011	RWE-Rhein-Ruhr Sporthalle, Mülheim, Germany	Won WBA interim cruiserweight title
24	Win	23–1	Ali Ismailov	KO	1 (12), 2:23	18 Dec 2010	Max Schmeling Halle, Berlin, Germany	
23	Win	22–1	Zack Page	UD	8	5 Jun 2010	Jahnsportforum, Neubrandenburg, Germany	
22	Win	21–1	César David Crenz	UD	12	12 Mar 2010	Max Schmeling Halle, Berlin, Germany	Retained IBF Inter-Continental cruiserweight title
21	Win	20–1	Enad Ličina	UD	12	17 Oct 2009	O2 World, Berlin, Germany	Won IBF Inter-Continental cruiserweight title
20	Win	19–1	Aaron Williams	UD	8	9 May 2009	Jako Arena, Bamberg, Germany	
19	Win	18–1	Micky Steeds	KO	5 (8), 0:51	28 Feb 2009	Jahnsportforum, Neubrandenburg, Germany	
18	Win	17–1	Michael Simms	MD	8	25 Oct 2008	Weser-Ems-Halle, Oldenburg, Germany	
17	Win	16–1	Santiago De Paula	TKO	5 (8), 1:14	30 Aug 2008	Max-Schmeling-Halle, Berlin, Germany	
16	Win	15–1	Stefan Raaff	RTD	3 (8)	7 Jun 2008	Karl-Eckel-Weg Halle, Hattersheim am Main, Germany	
15	Loss	14–1	Wayne Braithwaite	TKO	3 (12), 1:52	29 Mar 2008	Sparkassen-Arena, Kiel, Germany	Lost WBA Fedelatin and WBC Latino cruiserweight titles
14	Win	14–0	Mohamed Azzaoui	KO	3 (12), 2:08	29 Dec 2007	Seidensticker Halle, Bielefeld, Germany	Retained WBA Fedelatin cruiserweight title; Won vacant WBC Latino cruiserweight title
13	Win	13–0	Ismail Abdoul	UD	8	27 Oct 2007	Messe, Erfurt, Germany	
12	Win	12–0	Daniel Bispo	KO	1 (10), 1:01	18 Aug 2007	Max-Schmeling-Halle, Berlin, Germany	Won vacant WBA Fedelatin cruiserweight title
11	Win	11–0	Thomas Hansvoll	KO	1 (8), 2:22	23 Jun 2007	Stadthalle, Zwickau, Germany	
10	Win	10–0	Héctor Alfredo Ávila	UD	8	14 Apr 2007	Porsche-Arena, Stuttgart, Germany	
9	Win	9–0	Jason Curry	KO	1 (8), 1:12	16 Dec 2006	Bigbox Allgäu, Kempten, Germany	
8	Win	8–0	Jean Claude Bikoi	UD	8	23 Sep 2006	Rittal Arena, Wetzlar, Germany	
7	Win	7–0	Carl Gathright	KO	1 (8), 1:18	13 May 2006	Stadthalle, Zwickau, Germany	
6	Win	6–0	Ervin Slonka	RTD	3 (6), 1:30	8 Apr 2006	Saaltheater Geulen, Aachen, Germany	
5	Win	5–0	Aleksejs Kosobokovs	UD	6	4 Mar 2006	Large EWE Arena, Oldenburg, Germany	
4	Win	4–0	Aleksejs Kosobokovs	DQ	2 (6), 2:57	10 Dec 2005	Arena Leipzig, Leipzig, Germany	Kosobokovs disqualified for an intentional headbutt
3	Win	3–0	Mounir Chibi	UD	4	12 Nov 2005	Alsterdorfer Sporthalle, Hamburg, Germany	
2	Win	2–0	Vladislav Druso	KO	1 (4), 1:53	10 Sep 2005	Sportcenter Jumps, Berlin, Germany	
1	Win	1–0	David Vicena	TKO	2 (4), 2:59	3 Sep 2005	Internationales Congress Centrum, Berlin, Germany	

Sporting positions
Regional boxing titles
Vacant Title last held by Luis Andres Pineda	WBA Fedelatin cruiserweight champion 18 August 2007 – 29 March 2008	Succeeded by Wayne Braithwaite
Vacant Title last held by Eliseo Castillo	WBC Latino cruiserweight champion 29 December 2007 – 29 March 2008	Succeeded by Wayne Braithwaite
Preceded by Enad Ličina	IBF Inter-Continental cruiserweight champion 18 August 2007 – June 2010; Vacated	Vacant Title next held by Giulian Ilie
World boxing titles
Preceded by Steve Hérélius	WBA cruiserweight champion Interim title 12 February 2011 – 1 October 2011; Vacated	Vacant Title next held by Denis Lebedev
Preceded by Steve Cunningham	IBF cruiserweight champion 1 October 2011 – 23 November 2015; Stripped	Succeeded by Victor Emilio Ramírez interim champion promoted
Vacant Title last held by Tomasz Adamek	The Ring cruiserweight champion 4 February 2012 – 22 September 2015; Stripped	Vacant Title next held by Oleksandr Usyk
