= Yusiel Nápoles =

Cuban boxer

Personal information
- Born: November 19, 1983 (age 42)
Medal record
Men's Boxing
Representing Cuba
Central American and Caribbean Games
Gold medal – first place	2006 Cartagena	Light heavyweight
Pan American Games
Silver medal – second place	2007 Rio	Light Heavyweight

Yusiel Nápoles Marcillan (born November 19, 1983) is a Cuban amateur boxer best known to win the 2006 Central American and Caribbean Games at light heavyweight. He is not to be confused with middleweight Yudiel Nápoles.

== Career ==
2005 he participated at the world championships but was KOd by Mourad Sahraoui.

2006 he won Gold at the Central American and Caribbean Games beating Eleider Álvarez in the quarterfinals, Carlos Negron in the semi and Shawn Terry Cox in the final.

2007 he reached the final of the PanAm Games by beating Christopher Downs but was KOd by his old foe Alvarez.

He did not participate in the Nationals 2008 and wasn't sent to the Olympic qualifier.
