= Christopher Downs =

American boxer

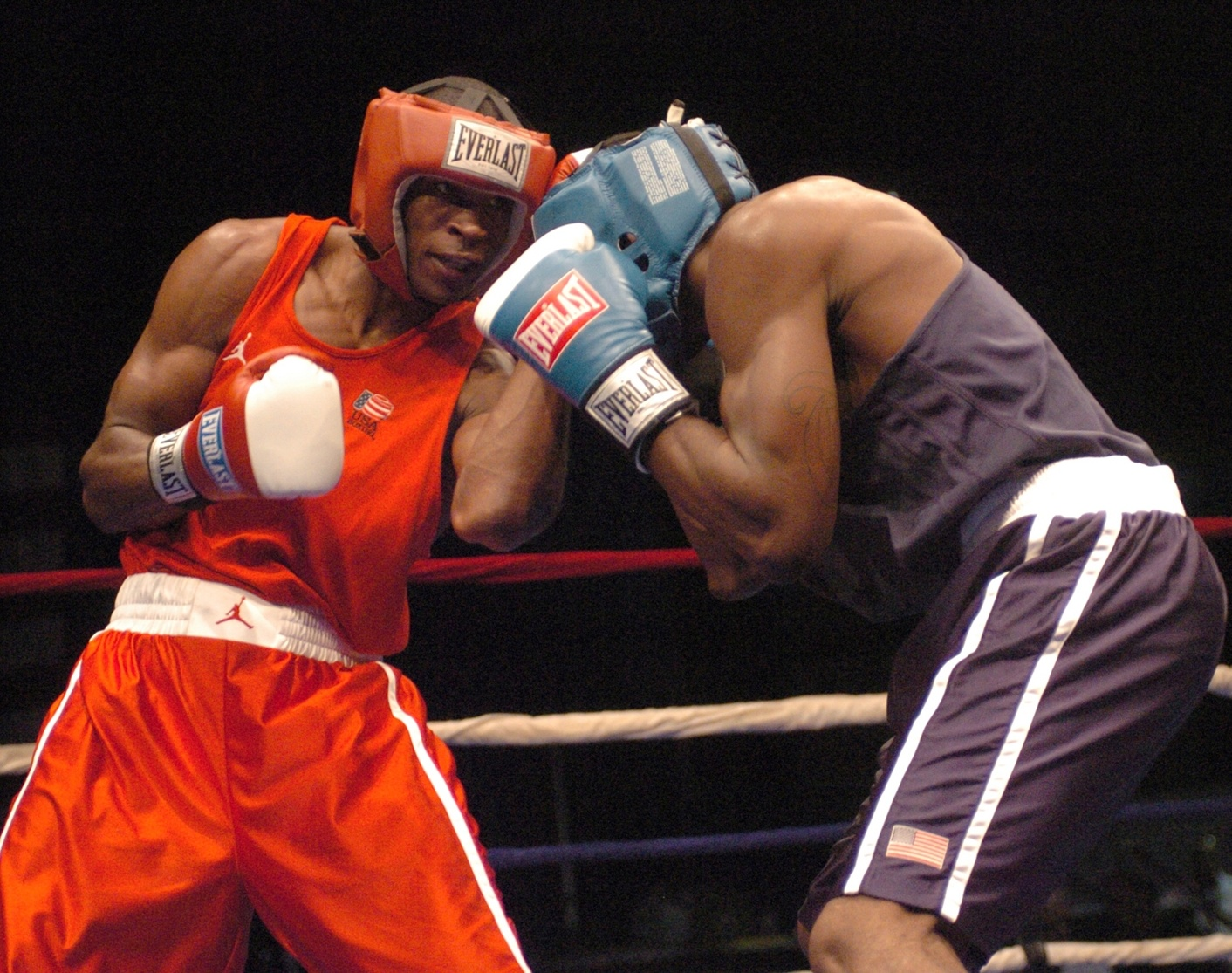
- Christopher Downs (left) in 2008

Personal information
- Born: November 5, 1974 (age 51) Knoxville, Tennessee, United States
- Height: 6 ft 4 in (1.93 m)
- Weight: 178 lb (81 kg)

Sport
- Sport: Boxing
- Club: U.S. Army
- Military career
- Allegiance: United States
- Branch: United States Army
- Service years: 1997–present
- Rank: First sergeant
- Conflicts: Iraq War
Medal record
Representing the United States
Pan American Games
Bronze medal – third place	2007 Rio	Light Heavyweight

Christopher Downs (born November 5, 1974) is a US-American amateur boxer who won a bronze medal at the 2007 Pan American Games 2007.

== Career ==
A member of the U.S. Army's World Class Athlete Program, Sergeant Christopher Downs only took up boxing in 2003 at an advanced age. He had to put it on hold when he served in Tikrit in Iraq from January 2004 to March 2005. Downs was a member of a 16-man platoon of which 11 men were wounded and received Purple Hearts, including four under his direct command. He says "Anybody that sees their friends and superiors put their lives on the line, knowing what can happen to you any second of the day, it changes your perspective. It opens your eyes to a lot of things and opens your mind to a lot of things you probably wouldn't try." He's still on active duty, but the military will allow him to dedicate all of his time training for Beijing.

The aggressive puncher lost 2005 in the semifinal but became 2006 and 2007 US light-heavyweight champion.

He won bronze at the 2007 PanAm Games where he lost to Cuban Yusiel Napoles.

At the World Championships 2007 he upset Ukrainian Ismail Sillakh but lost to Brit Tony Jeffries.

At the first Olympic qualifier of the Americas he upset highly touted Cuban champion Julio César La Cruz, but lost to Venezuelan Luis Gonzalez, at the second qualifier he was eliminated by Julio Castillo.
