= Alexander Frenkel =

German boxer

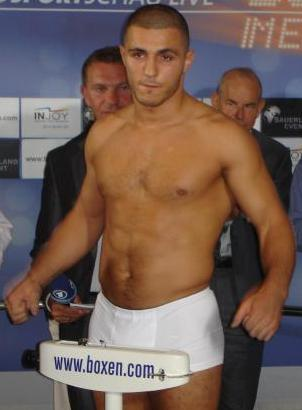
- Frenkel in 2007

Personal information
- Nationality: Ukrainian
- Born: 4 March 1985 (age 41) Kirovograd, Ukrainian SSR, Soviet Union (now Ukraine)
- Height: 1.86 m (6 ft 1 in)
- Weight: Cruiserweight

Boxing career
- Reach: 180 cm (71 in)
- Stance: Orthodox

Boxing record
- Total fights: 23
- Wins: 23
- Win by KO: 18
- Losses: 0

Alexander Frenkel (born 4 March 1985) is a Ukrainian and German former professional boxer who competed from 2006 to 2010. He won the European cruiserweight title in 2010 and retired undefeated in 2011.

== Professional career ==
Frenkel made his professional debut on 23 September 2006, scoring a first-round stoppage over Anton Lascek. He won his first regional championship—the vacant IBF Youth cruiserweight title—on 17 May 2008, knocking out Cory Phelps in one round. After further knockout wins all throughout 2009, Frenkel won the European cruiserweight title on 18 September 2010 after a vicious knockout of defending champion Enzo Maccarinelli. In October 2011, having not fought in more than a year, Frenkel was forced to vacate the title.

== Professional boxing record ==
23 fights	23 wins	0 losses
By knockout	18	0
By decision	5	0

No.	Result	Record	Opponent	Type	Round, time	Date	Location	Notes
23	Win	23–0	(United Kingdom) Enzo Maccarinelli	KO	7 (12), 2:30	18 Sep 2010	(United Kingdom) LG Arena, Birmingham, England	Won European cruiserweight title
22	Win	22–0	(United States) Michael Simms	UD	8	13 Mar 2010	Max-Schmeling-Halle, Berlin, Germany	
21	Win	21–0	(United States) Kelvin Davis	TKO	1 (8), 2:07	7 Nov 2009	Nuremberg Arena, Nuremberg, Germany	
20	Win	20–0	(Hungary) Jozsef Nagy	RTD	2 (8), 3:00	19 Sep 2009	Jahnsportforum, Neubrandenburg, Germany	
19	Win	19–0	(Hungary) Laszlo Hubert	KO	3 (8), 0:55	12 Sep 2009	Messecenter, Herning, Denmark	
18	Win	18–0	(Argentina) Rodolfo De Dominicis	TKO	3 (8), 1:35	27 Jun 2009	Max-Schmeling-Halle, Berlin, Germany	
17	Win	17–0	(Hungary) Balint Turgonyi	TKO	7 (8), 2:23	9 May 2009	Jako Arena, Bamberg, Germany	
16	Win	16–0	(South Africa) Ruben Groenewald	TKO	5 (8), 1:16	4 Apr 2009	Burg-Wächter Castello, Düsseldorf, Germany	
15	Win	15–0	(United States) Cory Phelps	KO	1 (10), 1:55	17 May 2008	Oberfrankenhalle, Bayreuth, Germany	Won vacant IBF Youth cruiserweight title
14	Win	14–0	(United States) Arthur Williams	TKO	5 (8), 2:02	16 Feb 2008	Nuremberg Arena, Nuremberg, Germany	
13	Win	13–0	(United States) Mike Alexander	UD	8	29 Sep 2007	EWE Arena, Oldenburg, Germany	
12	Win	12–0	(United States) Shane Swartz	KO	1 (8), 0:50	18 Aug 2007	Max-Schmeling-Halle, Berlin, Germany	
11	Win	11–0	(Croatia) Drazen Ordulj	KO	2 (8), 1:50	21 Jul 2007	Festzelt, Hattersheim am Main, Germany	
10	Win	10–0	(Czech Republic) Pavol Polakovic	UD	6	23 Jun 2007	Stadthalle, Zwickau, Germany	
9	Win	9–0	(Poland) Lukasz Rusiewicz	UD	6	26 May 2007	Jako Arena, Bamberg, Germany	
8	Win	8–0	(Hungary) Ferenc Zsalek	KO	1 (6), 1:31	14 Apr 2007	Porsche-Arena, Stuttgart, Germany	
7	Win	7–0	(Russia) Teymuraz Kekelidz	KO	1 (6)	24 Mar 2007	Yunost, Kaliningrad, Russia	
6	Win	6–0	(Lithuania) Remigijus Ziausys	KO	2 (6), 2:36	03 Mar 2007	StadtHalle, Rostock, Germany	
5	Win	5–0	(Croatia) Teo Begovic	TKO	1 (6)	17 Feb 2007	Universal Hall Mitte, Berlin, Germany	
4	Win	4–0	(Croatia) Tomislav Jurić Grgić	KO	2 (4)	16 Dec 2006	Bigbox Allgäu, Kempten, Germany	
3	Win	3–0	(Czech Republic) Vladislav Druso	TKO	4 (4)	18 Nov 2006	Sporthalle, Steyr, Austria	
2	Win	2–0	(Germany) Stefan Raaff	UD	4	4 Nov 2006	RWE Rhein-Ruhr Sporthalle, Mülheim, Germany	
1	Win	1–0	(Slovakia) Anton Lascek	TKO	1 (4), 2:30	23 Sep 2006	Karl Eckel Halle, Hattersheim am Main, Germany	

Sporting positions
Regional boxing titles
Vacant Title last held by Jean Marc Monrose	IBF Youth cruiserweight champion 17 May 2008 – 2011; Vacated	Vacant Title next held by Agron Dzila
Preceded by Enzo Maccarinelli	European cruiserweight champion 18 September 2010 – October 2011; Vacated	Vacant Title next held by Aleksandr Alekseyev
