= Athletics at the 2010 Central American and Caribbean Games =

Athletics at the XXI CAC Games
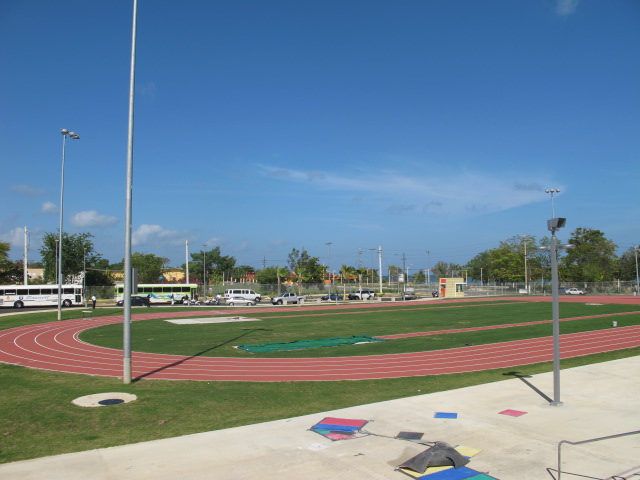
- The track and field at the host stadium
- Dates: July 24–30
- Host city: Mayagüez, Puerto Rico
- Venue: Mayagüez Athletics Stadium
- Events: 47
- Participation: 431 athletes from 30 nations
- Records set: 12

The athletics competition at the 2010 Central American and Caribbean Games was held at the Mayagüez Athletics Stadium in Mayagüez, Puerto Rico from July 24–30. A total of 47 events were contested, 24 by men and 23 by women, and 12 Games records were set. Also, 3 national records were set (2 by the men and 1 by the women). Of the twenty-three nations that won a medal in the competition, Jamaica was the most successful, topping the table with ten golds and an overall haul of 25 medals. Mexico and Colombia were the next best performers, with seven and six golds, respectively. The hosts were fourth in the rankings with four golds and sixteen medals in all.

Cuba – typically one of the strongest teams in the region – was absent from the contest, but the quality of the performances on show remained high regardless. Among the stand-out competitors of the competition, Churandy Martina played a part in all his country's medals, winning their two golds with a 100 metres/200 metres double and anchoring the men's 4 × 100 metres relay team to the bronze medal. Beverly Ramos excelled on home turf: she won the 5000 metres and 3000 metres steeplechase races with Games record times and also took the bronze in the 1500 metres. Juan Luis Barrios of Mexico completed a 1500/5000 m double while his compatriot Juan Carlos Romero won 5000 silver and the 10,000 metres gold. Rosibel García of Colombia retained her 1500 m title from 2006, but also added the 800 m gold to her tally. Venezuelan athlete Eduard Villanueva came close to the same feat in the men's events, but was runner-up over the longer distance.

== Medal summary ==
=== Men's track events ===
Event	Gold		Silver		Bronze	
100 m	Churandy Martina; Netherlands Antilles	10.07	Daniel Bailey; Antigua and Barbuda	10.08	Lerone Clarke; Jamaica	10.15
200 m	Churandy Martina; Netherlands Antilles	20.25 GR	Rasheed Dwyer; Jamaica	20.49 PB	Rondel Sorrillo; Trinidad and Tobago	20.59
400 m	Nery Brenes; Costa Rica	44.84 NR PB	Tabarie Henry; U.S. Virgin Islands	45.07	Allodin Fothergill; Jamaica	45.24 PB
800 m	Eduard Villanueva; Venezuela	1:47.73	Moise Joseph; Haiti	1:47.79	Aldwyn Sappleton; Jamaica	1:48.12
1500 m	Juan Luis Barrios; Mexico	3:44.85	Eduard Villanueva; Venezuela	3:45.04	Pablo Solares; Mexico	3:45.30
5000 m	Juan Luis Barrios; Mexico	13:44.41 GR	Juan Carlos Romero; Mexico	13:56.17	Cleveland Forde; Guyana	14:08.95 PB
10,000 m	Juan Carlos Romero; Mexico	29:13.71	Tomás Luna; Mexico	29:14.15	Luis Collazo; Puerto Rico	29:36.35
110 m hurdles	Ryan Brathwaite; Barbados	13.39	Eric Keddo; Jamaica	13.52	Héctor Cotto; Puerto Rico	13.71
400 m hurdles	Leford Green; Jamaica	48.47 GR	Javier Culson; Puerto Rico	48.58	Roxroy Cato; Jamaica	49.62
3000 m steeplechase	Alex Greaux; Puerto Rico	8:56.47	Josafat Gonzalez; Mexico	8:57.98	Marvin Blanco; Venezuela	9:03.10
4 × 100 m relay	Trinidad and Tobago; Rondel Sorrillo; Marc Burns; Emmanuel Callander; Keston Bledman	38.24 GR	Jamaica; Kenroy Anderson; Oshane Bailey; Rasheed Dwyer; Lerone Clarke	38.78	Netherlands Antilles; Kwidama Prince; Brian Mariano; Curtis Cock; Churandy Martina	38.82
4 × 400 m relay	Jamaica; Oral Thompson; Leford Green; Roxroy Cato; Allodin Fothergill	3:01.68 GR	Bahamas; Andretti Bain; Michael Mathieu; La'Sean Pickstock; Demetrius Pinder	3:01.82	Trinidad and Tobago; Zwede Hewitt; Lalonde Gordon; Gavyn Nero; Jarrin Solomon	3:04.07

=== Men's road events ===
Event	Gold		Silver		Bronze	
Marathon	José Amado García; Guatemala	2:21:35 PB	Carlos Cordero; Mexico	2:22:06	Juan Carlos Cardona; Colombia	2:22:35
20 km walk	Eder Sanchez; Mexico	1:22:32 GR	Luis Fernando López; Colombia	1:22:55	Gustavo Restrepo; Colombia	1:22:56 PB
50 km walk	Horacio Nava; Mexico	3:56:46	Rodrigo Moreno; Colombia	4:11:42	Cristian Berdeja; Mexico	4:32:51

=== Men's field events ===
Event	Gold		Silver		Bronze	
High jump	Donald Thomas; Bahamas	2.28 m	Trevor Barry; Bahamas	2.28 m	Wanner Miller; Colombia	2.19 m
Pole vault	Giovanni Lanaro; Mexico	5.60 m GR	Brandon Estrada; Puerto Rico	5.40 m	Christian Sánchez; Mexico	5.20 m
Long jump	Tyrone Smith; Bermuda	8.22 m NR	Muhammad Halim; U.S. Virgin Islands	7.79 m	Carlos Morgan; Cayman Islands	7.72 m
Triple jump	Leevan Sands; Bahamas	17.21 m	Randy Lewis; Grenada	17.20 m	Samyr Lainé; Haiti	17.01 m
Shot put	Dorian Scott; Jamaica	18.92 m	O'Dayne Richards; Jamaica	18.74 m	Eder Moreno; Colombia	18.45 m
Discus	Jason Morgan; Jamaica	59.43 m	Jesús Parejo; Venezuela	54.88 m	Mario Cota; Mexico	54.70 m
Hammer	Aldo Bello; Venezuela	65.10 m	Jean Rosario; Puerto Rico	63.31 m	Pedro Muñoz; Venezuela	63.03 m
Javelin	Arley Ibargüen; Colombia	78.93 m	Dayron Márquez; Colombia	76.31 m	Juan José Méndez; Mexico	76.03 m
Decathlon	Maurice Smith; Jamaica	8109 pts	Steven Marrero; Puerto Rico	7506 pts PB	Marcos Sanchez; Puerto Rico	7311 pts

=== Women's track events ===
Event	Gold		Silver		Bronze	
100 m	Tahesia Harrigan; British Virgin Islands	11.19	Ayanna Hutchinson; Trinidad and Tobago	11.47	Yomara Hinestroza; Colombia	11.51
200 m	Cydonie Mothersille; Cayman Islands	22.91 GR	Carol Rodríguez; Puerto Rico	23.37	Darlenis Obregón; Colombia	23.76
400 m	Christine Amertil; Bahamas	52.16 SB	Aliann Pompey; Guyana	52.33	Tiandra Ponteen; Saint Kitts and Nevis	52.75
800 m	Rosibel García; Colombia	2:03.77	Andrea Ferris; Panama	2:04.16	Marian Burnett; Guyana	2:04.45
1500 m	Rosibel García; Colombia	4:21.17	Pilar McShine; Trinidad and Tobago	4:21.66	Beverly Ramos; Puerto Rico	4:22.02
5000 m	Beverly Ramos; Puerto Rico	16:09.82 GR	Rachael Marchand; Puerto Rico	16:13.59	Yolanda Caballero; Colombia	16:14.75
10,000 m	Yolanda Caballero; Colombia	34:50.58	María Elena Valencia; Mexico	34:52.66	Rachael Marchand; Puerto Rico	34:55.79
100 m hurdles	Aleesha Barber; Trinidad and Tobago	13.09	Eliecit Palacios; Colombia	13.20	Andrea Bliss; Jamaica	13.20
400 m hurdles	Nickiesha Wilson; Jamaica	55.40	Zudikey Rodríguez; Mexico	55.54 PB	Janeil Bellille; Trinidad and Tobago	56.81 PB
3000 m steeplechase	Beverly Ramos; Puerto Rico	9:59.03 GR/PB	Ángela Figueroa; Colombia	10:18.28	Sandra Lopez Reyes; Mexico	10:18.88 PB
4 × 100 m relay	Puerto Rico; Beatriz Cruz; Celiangeli Morales; Erika Rivera; Carol Rodriguez	43.46	Colombia; Eliecit Palacios; Maria Idrobo; Darlenis Obregón; Yomara Hinestroza	43.63	Jamaica; Audria Segree; Jovanee Jarrett; Andrea Bliss; Anastasia Le-Roy	44.27
4 × 400 m relay	Jamaica; Davita Prendergast; Nikita Tracey; Dominique Blake; Clora Williams	3:32.31	Colombia; Yennifer Padilla; Maria Idrobo; Darlenis Obregón; Norma Gonzalez	3:33.03 NR	Mexico; Carla Dueñas; Nallely Vela; Gabriela Medina; Zudikey Rodríguez	3:33.33

=== Women's road events ===
Event	Gold		Silver		Bronze	
20 km walk	Sandra Galvis; Colombia	1:25:59 PB	Milángela Rosales; Venezuela	1:24:19 PB	Rosario Sánchez; Mexico	1:22:30 PB
Marathon	Marisol Romero; Mexico	2:44:30	Gabriela Traña; Costa Rica	2:46:22	Paula Apolonio; Mexico	2:48:46

=== Women's field events ===
Event	Gold		Silver		Bronze	
High jump	Levern Spencer; Saint Lucia	1.94 m	Sheree Francis; Jamaica	1.91 m	Maria Rifka; Mexico	1.91 m
Pole vault	Keisa Monterola; Venezuela	4.20 m GR	Andrea Zambrana; Puerto Rico	3.90 m	Milena Agudelo; Colombia	3.90 m
Long jump	Rhonda Watkins; Trinidad and Tobago	6.67 m GR	Jovanee Jarrett; Jamaica	6.52 m	Bianca Stuart; Bahamas	6.50 m
Triple jump	Kimberly Williams; Jamaica	14.23 m PB	Caterine Ibargüen; Colombia	14.10 m	Ayanna Alexander; Trinidad and Tobago	13.64 m
Shot put	Cleopatra Borel-Brown; Trinidad and Tobago	18.76 m	Zara Northover; Jamaica	17.04 m PB	Annie Alexander; Trinidad and Tobago	16.76 m
Discus	María Cubillán; Venezuela	52.21 m	Annie Alexander; Trinidad and Tobago	51.03 m	Paulina Flores; Mexico	49.57 m
Hammer	Ely Moreno; Colombia	66.98 m	Rosa Rodríguez; Venezuela	64.16 m	Natalie Grant; Jamaica	59.93 m
Javelin	Kateema Riettie; Jamaica	53.77 m	Fresa Nuñez; Dominican Republic	52.96 m	María Lucelly Murillo; Colombia	51.29 m
Heptathlon	Peaches Roach; Jamaica	5780 pts PB	Francia Manzanillo; Dominican Republic	5561 pts	Tammilee Kerr; Jamaica	5345 pts

== Medal table ==
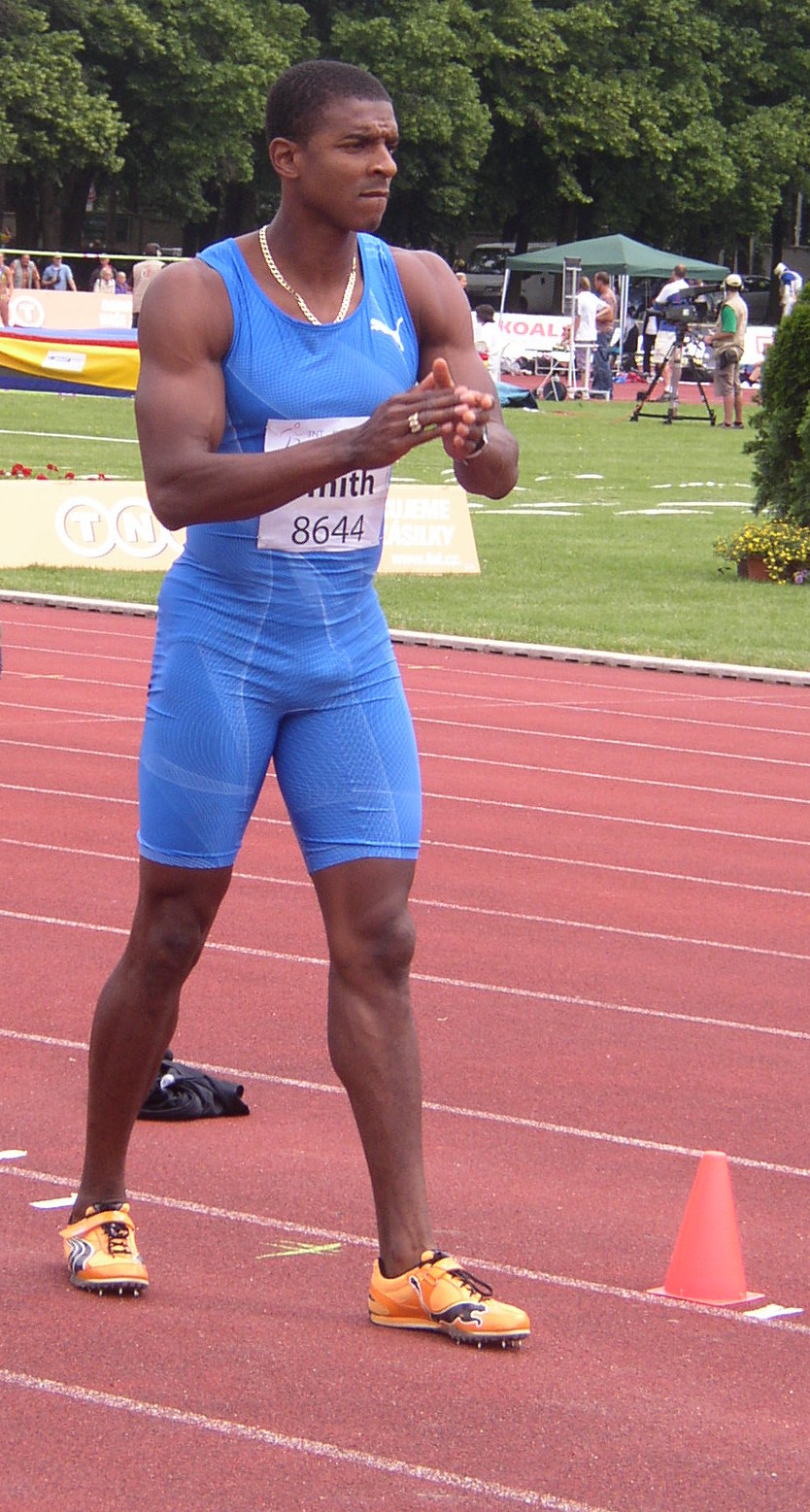
Maurice Smith was one of ten Jamaican gold medallists.

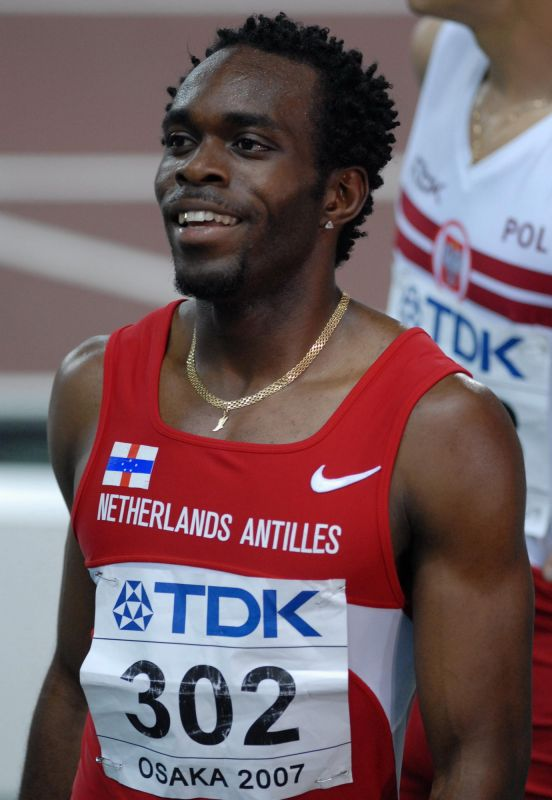
Churandy Martina propelled the Netherlands Antilles to eighth in the table.

* Host nation (Puerto Rico)

Rank	Nation	Gold	Silver	Bronze	Total
1	Jamaica	10	7	8	25
2	Mexico	7	6	11	24
3	Colombia	6	8	9	23
4	Puerto Rico*	4	7	5	16
5	Venezuela	4	4	2	10
6	Trinidad and Tobago	4	3	5	12
7	Bahamas	3	2	1	6
8	Netherlands Antilles	2	0	1	3
9	Costa Rica	1	1	0	2
10	Cayman Islands	1	0	1	2
11	Barbados	1	0	0	1
11	Bermuda	1	0	0	1
11	British Virgin Islands	1	0	0	1
11	Guatemala	1	0	0	1
11	Saint Lucia	1	0	0	1
16	Dominican Republic	0	2	0	2
16	Virgin Islands	0	2	0	2
18	Guyana	0	1	2	3
19	Haiti	0	1	1	2
20	Antigua and Barbuda	0	1	0	1
20	Grenada	0	1	0	1
20	Panama	0	1	0	1
23	Saint Kitts and Nevis	0	0	1	1
Totals (23 entries)		47	47	47	141

== Participating nations ==
Thirty of the 31 countries competing at the games were represented in the athletics competition, with 23 of these reaching the medal table. Aruba was the only nation without a representative in the events.

- Antigua and Barbuda (7)
- Bahamas (16)
- Barbados (7)
- Belize (5)
- Bermuda (6)
- British Virgin Islands (8)
- Cayman Islands (9)
- Colombia (32)
- Costa Rica (14)
- Dominica (3)
- Dominican Republic (31)
- El Salvador (7)
- Grenada (6)
- Guatemala (15)
- Guyana (7)
- Haiti (10)
- Honduras (5)
- Jamaica (45)
- Mexico (47)
- Netherlands Antilles (5)
- Nicaragua (4)
- Panama (7)
- Puerto Rico (60)
- Saint Kitts and Nevis (9)
- Saint Lucia (3)
- Saint Vincent and the Grenadines (4)
- Suriname (1)
- Trinidad and Tobago (28)
- Virgin Islands (9)
- Venezuela (21)
