= Swimming at the 2010 Central American and Caribbean Games =

- Venue: RUM Natatorium
- Location: (Puerto Rico) Mayagüez
- Dates: 18–23 July

Swimming at the 2010 Central American and Caribbean Games was taking place July 18–23 (Days 2–7) at the RUM Natatorium in Mayagüez, Puerto Rico.

== Schedule ==
The swimming competition featured a prelim/final format, with Prelims beginning at 9:00 a.m. and Finals at 6:00 p.m. Finals event schedule is:

| Date | Sunday; July 18 | Monday; July 19 | Tuesday; July 20 | Wednesday; July 21 | Thursday; July 22 | Friday; July 23 |
| E v e n t s | 100 free (m); 400 free (w); 200 fly (m); 100 back (m); 200 breast (w); 1500 free (m); 800 Free Relay (w) | 50 free (w); 400 IM (m); 50 back (w); 100 free (w); 50 breast (m); 200 IM (w); 800 Free Relay (m) | 100 fly (m); 100 breast (w); 200 back (m); 1500 free (w); 800 free (m); 400 Medley Relay (w) | 100 back (w); 50 free 100 fly (w); 200 breast (m); 200 free (w); 400 Free Relay (m) | 50 fly (m); 50 back (m); 400 IM (w); 200 IM (m); 800 free (w); 400 free (m); 400 Free Relay (w) | 50 free (w); 100 breast (m); 50 breast (w); 200 back (w); 200 free (m); 200 fly (w); 400 Medley Relay (m) |

== Participating countries ==
207 total swimmers from 24 countries participated at the 2010 Games. Team delegates (with size) were from:

- Aruba (6)
- Bahamas (11)
- Barbados (8)
- Bermuda (6)
- Cayman Islands (6)
- Colombia (14)
- Costa Rica (8)
- Dominican Republic (10)
- El Salvador (5)
- Grenada (3)
- Guatemala (5)
- Guyana (1)
- Honduras (7)
- Jamaica (11)
- Mexico (26)
- Netherlands Antilles (3)
- Nicaragua (1)
- Panama (3)
- Puerto Rico (25)
- Saint Lucia (4)
- Suriname (4)
- Trinidad and Tobago (10)
- Venezuela (23)
- (United States Virgin Islands) Virgin Islands (7)

== Results ==
=== Men ===
| Games | Gold | | Silver | | Bronze | |
|---|---|---|---|---|---|---|
| 50m freestyle | George Bovell; Trinidad and Tobago | 22.23 | Albert Subirats; Venezuela | 22.78 | Roberto Gomez; Venezuela | 23.09 |
| 100m freestyle | Albert Subirats; Venezuela | 49.70 | Crox Acuña; Venezuela | 49.99 | Shaune Fraser; Cayman Islands | 50.26 |
| 200m freestyle | Shaune Fraser; Cayman Islands | 1:49.74 | Brett Fraser; Cayman Islands | 1:50.33 | Daniele Tirabassi; Venezuela | 1:50.51 |
| 400m freestyle | Cristian Quintero; Venezuela | 3:55.19 | Daniele Tirabassi; Venezuela | 3:55.63 | Julio Galofre; Colombia | 3:58.83 |
| 800m freestyle | Alejandro Gómez; Venezuela | 8:10.53 | Ricardo Monasterio; Venezuela | 8:14.49 | Luis Escobar; Mexico | 8:16.36 |
| 1500m freestyle | Alejandro Gómez; Venezuela | 15:37.59 | Luis Escobar; Mexico | 15:42.74 | Ricardo Monasterio; Venezuela | 15:49.07 |
| 50m backstroke | Omar Pinzón; Colombia | 25.96 | George Bovell; Trinidad and Tobago | 26.08 | Albert Subirats; Venezuela | 26.28 |
| 100m backstroke | Albert Subirats; Venezuela | 56.06 | Nicholas Neckles; Barbados | 56.44 | Miguel Robles; Mexico | 56.45; NR |
| 200m backstroke | Omar Pinzón; Colombia | 2:00.40 | Brett Fraser; Cayman Islands | 2:02.35 | Miguel Robles; Mexico | 2:02.76 |
| 50m breaststroke | Edgar R. Crespo; Panama | 28.49 | Rodion Davelaar; Netherlands Antilles | 28.61 | Daniel Velez; Puerto Rico | 28.78 |
| 100m breaststroke | Edgar R. Crespo; Panama | 1:02.07 | David Oliver Mercado; Mexico | 1:02.68 | Daniel Velez; Puerto Rico | 1:03.18 |
| 200m breaststroke | David Oliver; Mexico | 2:16.10 | Édgar R. Crespo; Panama | 2:17.48 | Juan Guerra; El Salvador | 2:20.90 |
| 50m butterfly | Octavio Alesi; Venezuela | 23.70 | Albert Subirats; Venezuela | 23.75 | Vereance Burrows (The Bahamas) Bahamas | 24.30 |
| 100m butterfly | Albert Subirats; Venezuela | 52.53 | Octavio Alesi; Venezuela | 52.89 | Pablo R. Marmolejo Vargas; Mexico | 54.83 |
| 200m butterfly | Omar Pinzón; Colombia | 1:58.99 | Ramiro Ramirez Juarez; Mexico | 2:00.84 | Julio Galofre; Colombia | 2:01.28 |
| 200m IM | Bradley Ally; Barbados | 2:02.32 | Omar Enriquez; Mexico | 2:04.83 | Omar Pinzón; Colombia | 2:05.30 |
| 400m IM | Bradley Ally; Barbados | 4:21.49 | Ezequiel Trujillo Alves; Mexico | 4:22.05; NR | Omar Enriquez Tenorio; Mexico | 4:25.39 |
| 400m freestyle relay | Venezuela; Crox Acuña; Cristian Quintero; Roberto Gomez; Albert Subirats | 3:22.35 | Trinidad and Tobago; George Bovell; Caryl Luta Blondell; Joshua Dominic Mc Leod; Jarryd Gregoire | 3:25.73 | Mexico; Jose Sotomayor; Jaime A. Mendiola; Gustavo A. Berreta; Gerardo J. Banuelos | 3:27.43 |
| 800m freestyle relay | Colombia; Julio Galofre; Mateo de Angulo; Juan David Molina; Omar Pinzón | 7:31.16 | Mexico; Gerardo J. Bañuelos; Gustavo A. Berretta; Arturo Perez Vertti; Jaime A. Mendiola Figueroa | 7:34.47 | Puerto Rico; Raúl Martinez; James Moore Bermudez; Eliezer Lizardi; Christian Bayo | 7:37.90 |
| 400m medley relay | Venezuela; Albert Subirats; Leopoldo Andara; Octavio Alesi; Crox Acuña | 3:44.22 | Mexico; Miguel Robles Castro; David Oliver Mercado; Pablo Marmolejo Vargas; Gerardo Bañuelos | 3:45.41 | Colombia; Omar Pinzón; Jorge Murillo; Julio Galofre; Mateo de Angulo | 3:47.69 |

=== Women ===
| Games | Gold | | Silver | | Bronze | |
|---|---|---|---|---|---|---|
| 50m freestyle | Vanessa García; Puerto Rico | 25.18 | Arianna Vanderpool-Wallace (The Bahamas) Bahamas | 25.53 | Arlene Semeco; Venezuela | 25.63 |
| 100m freestyle | Vanessa García; Puerto Rico | 55.00 | Arianna Vanderpool-Wallace (The Bahamas) Bahamas | 55.07 | Arlene Semeco; Venezuela | 56.21 |
| 200m freestyle | Andreina Pinto; Venezuela | 2:01.09 | Liliana Ibáñez; Mexico | 2:02.16 | Pamela Benítez; El Salvador | 2:02.67 |
| 400m freestyle | Andreina Pinto; Venezuela | 4:11.36 | Patricia Castañeda; Mexico | 4:15.02 | Pamela Benítez; El Salvador | 4:15.58 |
| 800m freestyle | Andreina Pinto; Venezuela | 8:40.51 | Patricia Castañeda; Mexico | 8:42.54 | Pamela Benítez; El Salvador | 8:44.47 |
| 1500m freestyle | Susana Escobar; Mexico | 16:39.27 | Andreina Pinto; Venezuela | 16:41.06 | Patricia Castañeda; Mexico | 16:51.33 |
| 50m backstroke | Gisela Morales; Guatemala | 29.18 | Fernanda González; Mexico | 29.19 | Carolina Colorado Henao; Colombia | 29.52 |
| 100m backstroke | Gisela Morales; Guatemala | 1:02.32 | Fernanda González; Mexico | 1:02.42 | Lourdes Villaseñor Reyes; Mexico | 1:02.96 |
| 200m backstroke | Gisela Morales; Guatemala | 2:12.36 | Fernanda González; Mexico | 2:12.90 | Lourdes Reyes; Mexico | 2:14.01 |
| 50m breaststroke | Alia Atkinson; Jamaica | 31.91 | Arantxa Medina Alegria; Mexico | 32.57; NR | Patricia Casellas; Puerto Rico | 32.98 |
| 100m breaststroke | Alia Atkinson; Jamaica | 1:10.25 | Arantxa Medina Alegria; Mexico | 1:10.80 | Byanca M. Rodriguez; Mexico | 1:10.96 |
| 200m breaststroke | Alia Atkinson; Jamaica | 2:30.99 | Byanca M. Rodriguez; Mexico | 2:35.82 | Arantxa Medina Alegria; Mexico | 2:36.67 |
| 50m butterfly | Arianna Vanderpool-Wallace (The Bahamas) Bahamas | 26.92 | Alana Dillette (The Bahamas) Bahamas | 27.25 | Jeserik Pinto; Venezuela | 27.32 |
| 100m butterfly | Arianna Vanderpool-Wallace (The Bahamas) Bahamas | 59.74; NR | Rita Medrano; Mexico | 1:00.21 | Elimar Barrios; Venezuela | 1:01.19 |
| 200m butterfly | Rita Medrano; Mexico | 2:11.25 | Prisciliana Escobar; Mexico | 2:12.14 | Andreina Pinto; Venezuela | 2:16.09 |
| 200m IM | Alia Atkinson; Jamaica | 2:17.31 | Rita Medrano Muñoz; Mexico | 2:17.80 | Fernanda González; Mexico | 2:18.39 |
| 400m IM | Susana Escobar; Mexico | 4:50.03 | Rita Medrano; Mexico | 4:51.42 | Barbara Caraballo; Puerto Rico | 5:01.77 |
| 400m freestyle relay | Venezuela; Ximena Vilar; Jeserik Pinto; Yanel Pinto; Arlene Semeco | 3:49.69 | Puerto Rico; Coral López; Alana Berrocal; Debra Rodríguez; Vanessa García | 3:50.53 | Mexico; Liliana Ibáñez; Martha Beltran Sanchez; Arantxa Medina Alegria; Fernanda González | 3:50.62 |
| 800m freestyle relay | Venezuela; Yanel Pinto; Elimar Barrios; Darneys Orozco; Andreina Pinto | 8:20.08 | Colombia; Isabela Acuña; Jessica Camposano; Valentina Hurtado; María Álvarez | 8:31.14 | (The Bahamas) Bahamas; Alana Dillette; Teisha Lightbourne; Jenna Lee Chaplin; Arianna Vanderpool-Wallace | 8:36.28 |
| 400m medley relay | Mexico; Fernanda González; Arantxa Medina; Rita Medrano; Liliana Ibáñez | 4:09.29 | Puerto Rico; Alana Berrocal; Patricia Casellas; Barbara Caraballo; Vanessa García | 4:16.57 | (The Bahamas) Bahamas; Alana Dillette; Alicia Lightbourne; Arianna Vanderpool-Wallace; Ariel Weelch | 4:18.46 |

== Medal table ==
* Host nation (Puerto Rico)

| Rank | Nation | Gold | Silver | Bronze | Total |
|---|---|---|---|---|---|
| 1 | Venezuela | 14 | 7 | 9 | 30 |
| 2 | Mexico | 5 | 20 | 13 | 38 |
| 3 | Colombia | 4 | 1 | 5 | 10 |
| 4 | Jamaica | 4 | 0 | 0 | 4 |
| 5 | Guatemala | 3 | 0 | 0 | 3 |
| 6 | Bahamas | 2 | 3 | 3 | 8 |
| 7 | Puerto Rico* | 2 | 2 | 5 | 9 |
| 8 | Barbados | 2 | 1 | 0 | 3 |
| 8 | Panama | 2 | 1 | 0 | 3 |
| 10 | Cayman Islands | 1 | 2 | 1 | 4 |
| 11 | Trinidad and Tobago | 1 | 2 | 0 | 3 |
| 12 | Netherlands Antilles | 0 | 1 | 0 | 1 |
| 13 | El Salvador | 0 | 0 | 4 | 4 |
| Totals (13 entries) | | 40 | 40 | 40 | 120 |
