= Racquetball at the Central American and Caribbean Games =

Sport at the Central American and Caribbean Games

Racquetball has been included at the Central American and Caribbean Games since 1990. Over that period Mexican players have dominated the podium, winning gold at every event in Men's and Women's Doubles, and winning gold in Men's and Women's Singles all but two times each. Mexico has also won every gold medal in the Men's and Women's Team events. Venezuela has the second most medals in men's events, while the Dominican Republic has won the second most medals in women's events.

There was a playoff in Men's and Women's Singles and Doubles for the bronze medal the first three times racquetball was in the Central American and Caribbean Games, but in 2002 that playoff was eliminated with both semi-finalists awarded bronze medals.

== Medal summary by event ==
=== Men's singles ===
Year	Gold	Silver	Bronze
1990	Mexico; Raúl Torres	Mexico; Juan Quevedo	Costa Rica; Sergio Montealegre
1993	Venezuela; Fabian Balmori	Mexico; Alvaro Maldonado	Mexico; Luis Muñoz
1998	Venezuela; Fabian Balmori	Puerto Rico; Gilberto Rodríguez	Costa Rica; Luis Gómez
2002	Mexico; Gilberto Mejia	Mexico; Álvaro Beltrán	Dominican Republic; Simon Perdomo; Belize; Matthew Anderson
2006	Mexico; Gilberto Mejia	Venezuela; Fabian Balmori	Venezuela; César Castro; Mexico; Álvaro Beltrán
2010	Mexico; Álvaro Beltrán	Mexico; Gilberto Mejia	Venezuela; César Castro; Dominican Republic; Simón Perdomo
2014	Mexico; Álvaro Beltrán	Mexico; Daniel de la Rosa	Colombia; Alejandro Herrera; Costa Rica; Felipe Camacho
2018	Mexico; Daniel de la Rosa	Colombia; Mario Mercado	Costa Rica; Andrés Acuña; Dominican Republic; Luis Perez
2023	Eduardo Portillo (MEX)	Rodrigo Montoya (MEX)	Andrés Acuña (CRC) Edwin Galicia (CCS)
2026	Rodrigo Montoya (MEX)	Eduardo Portillo (MEX)	Andrés Acuña (CRC) Ramon De Leon (DOM)

=== Men's doubles ===
Year	Gold	Silver	Bronze
1990	Mexico; Francisco Martin; Arturo Martin	Costa Rica; Orlando López; Mauricio Morera	Dominican Republic; Andrés Marranzini; Antonio Valenzuela
1993	Mexico; Javier Moreno; Luis Muñoz	Venezuela; Fabian Balmori; Jorge Hirsekorn	Costa Rica; Marco Cobb; Rodrigo Naranjo
1998	Mexico; Javier Moreno; Ignacio Bustillos	Venezuela; Ralf Reinhard; Jorge Hirsekorn	Guatemala; Gustavo Morales; Manolo Benfeldt
2002	Mexico; Javier Moreno; César Guzmán	Puerto Rico; Osvaldo Garcia; Curtis Winters	Guatemala; Gustavo Morales; Manolo Benfeldt; Venezuela; Ralf Reinhard; César Castro
2006	Mexico; Javier Moreno; Alejandro Peña	Guatemala; Gustavo Morales; Manolo Benfeldt	Venezuela; Fabian Balmori; Jorge Hirsekorn; Cuba; Raul Martinez; Maikel Moyet
2010	Mexico; Javier Moreno; Polo Gutiérrez	Dominican Republic; Luis Pérez; Simón Perdomo	Costa Rica; Felipe Camacho; Teobaldo Fumero; Venezuela; Fabian Balmori; Jorge Hirsekorn
2014	Mexico; Álvaro Beltrán; Javier Moreno	Dominican Republic; Luis Perez; Junior Rodriguez	Guatemala; Edwin Galicia; Christian Wer; Venezuela; Cesar Castillo; César Castro
2018	Mexico; Álvaro Beltrán; Daniel de la Rosa	Costa Rica; Andrés Acuña; Felipe Camacho	Colombia; Mario Mercado; Set Cubillos; Dominican Republic; Luis Perez; Ramon De Leon
2023	Mexico (MEX); Rodrigo Montoya; Francisco Mar	Costa Rica (CRC); Andrés Acuña; Gabriel Garcia	Centro Caribe Sports (CCS); Juan Salvatierra; Christian Wer Cuba (CUB); Yandy Espinoza; Maikel Moyet
2026	Mexico (MEX); Andree Parrilla; Eduardo Portillo	Guatemala (GUA); Christian Aldana; Juan Salvatierra	Dominican Republic (DOM); Luis Perez; Junior Rodriguez Costa Rica (CRC); Andrés Acuña; Sergio Acuña

=== Men's team ===
Year	Gold	Silver	Bronze
1990	Mexico; Raul Torres; Juan Quevedo; Eduardo Vizcaya; Arturo Martin; Francisco Martin	Venezuela; Fabian Balmori; Jorge Hirsekorn; César Castro	Panama; Jeffeer León; Ricaurter Miranda; Osmán Guillén; Femán de la Guardia
1993	Mexico; Alvaro Maldonado; Luis Muñoz; Juan Quevedo; Javier Moreno	Venezuela; Fabian Balmori; Jorge Hirsekorn; Rodrigo Ureva	Puerto Rico; Gilberto Rodriguez; Victor Álvarez; Osvaldo Garcia; Ray Martinez
1998	Mexico; Álvaro Beltrán; Alvaro Maldonado; Javier Moreno; Ignacio Bustillos	Venezuela; Fabian Balmori; Jorge Hirsekorn; Ralf Reinhard; Antonio Yamin	Puerto Rico; Gilberto Rodriguez; Miguel Santiago; Perry López
2002	Mexico; Gilberto Mejia; Álvaro Beltrán; Javier Moreno; César Guzmán	Puerto Rico; Osvaldo Garcia; Curtis Winters	Guatemala; Gustavo Morales; Manolo Benfeldt; Juan Salvatierra; Fernando Sierra
2006	Mexico; Gilberto Mejia; Álvaro Beltrán; Javier Moreno; Alejandro Peña	Venezuela; Fabian Balmori; Jorge Hirsekorn; César Castro	Guatemala; Gustavo Morales; Manolo Benfeldt; Juan Salvatierra; Fernando Sierra
2010	Mexico; Álvaro Beltrán; Gilberto Mejía; Javier Moreno; Polo Gutierrez	Dominican Republic; Luis Pérez; Simón Perdomo	Venezuela; César Castro; Marcelo Laprea; Fabian Balmori; Jorge Hirsekorn
2014	Mexico; Álvaro Beltrán; Javier Moreno; Daniel de la Rosa	Costa Rica; Felipe Camacho; Andrés Acuña; Andres Aviles; Joaquin Solera	Colombia; Alejandro Herrera; Cesar Castillo; César Castro Dominican Republic; Luis Perez; Junior Rodriguez
2018	Mexico; Álvaro Beltrán; Daniel de la Rosa; Rodrigo Montoya	Costa Rica; Felipe Camacho; Andrés Acuña	Colombia; Cesar Castillo; César Castro Dominican Republic; Luis Perez; Ramon De Leon
2023	Mexico (MEX); Rodrigo Montoya; Eduardo Portillo; Francisco Mar	Costa Rica (CRC); Andrés Acuña; Felipe Camacho; Gabriel Garcia	Cuba (CUB); Yandy Espinoza; Maikel Moyet; Cristian Menedez Centro Caribe Sports (CCS); Juan Salvatierra; Edwin Galicia; Christian Wer
2026	Mexico; Rodrigo Montoya; Andree Parrilla; Eduardo Portillo	Costa Rica; Gabriel Garcia; Andrés Acuña; Sergio Acuña	Cuba; Maykel Moyet; Christhian Menendez; Yandy Espinosa Guatemala; Hector Sierra; Christian Aldana; Juan Salvatierra

=== Women's singles ===
Year	Gold	Silver	Bronze
1990	Mexico; Hilda Rodriguez	Mexico; Diana Almeida	Dominican Republic; Rosa Gómez
1993	Dominican Republic; Claudine García	Mexico; Rosy Torres	Puerto Rico; Anna Maldonado
1998	Puerto Rico; Anna Maldonado	Mexico; Susana Acosta	Mexico; Maria Torres
2002	Mexico; Susana Acosta	Dominican Republic; Claudine García	Puerto Rico; Anna Maldonado; Mexico; Maria Torres
2006	Mexico; Paola Longoria	Dominican Republic; Claudine García	Puerto Rico; Anna Maldonado; Mexico; Susana Acosta
2010	Mexico; Paola Longoria	Dominican Republic; Claudine García	Puerto Rico; Anna Maldonado; Mexico; Jessica Parrilla
2014	Mexico; Paola Longoria	Mexico; Samantha Salas	Colombia; Cristina Amaya; Guatemala; Gabriela Martínez
2018	Mexico; Paola Longoria	Guatemala; Gabriela Martínez	Dominican Republic; Merynanyelly Delgado; Mexico; Alexandra Herrera
2023	Paola Longoria (MEX)	Ana Martínez (CCS)	Montserrat Mejía (MEX) Maricruz Ortiz (CRC)
2026	Alexandra Herrera (MEX)	Gabriela Martínez (GUA)	Maria Cespedes (DOM) Larissa Faeth (CRC)

=== Women's doubles ===
Year	Gold	Silver	Bronze
1990	Mexico; Hilda Rodriguez; Diana Almeida	Costa Rica; Gloriana Herrera; Andrea Ortiz	Dominican Republic; Rosa Gómez; Claudine García
1993	Mexico; Hilda Rodriguez; Diana Almeida	Costa Rica; Rose Koberg; Andrea Ortiz	Venezuela; Mercedes Valentiner; Matheus Guidmar
1998	Mexico; Maria Torres; Karina Hamilton	Venezuela; Mercedes Valentiner; Lily Geyer	Dominican Republic; Claudine García; Karina Saviñón
2002	Mexico; Lupita Torres; Nancy Enriquez	Dominican Republic; Rosa Gómez; Claudine García	Puerto Rico; Anna Maldonado; Marta Cañellas; Venezuela; Guiomar Matheus; Lily Geyer
2006	Mexico; Samantha Salas; Nancy Enriquez	Cuba; Patricia Balebona; Rosario Dominguez	Dominican Republic; Rosa Gómez; Claudine García; Guatemala; Jennifer Benfeldt; Lucy de Zachrisson
2010	Mexico; Samantha Salas; Susana Acosta	Dominican Republic; Claudine García; Yira Portes	Guatemala; Marie Gomar; Lucy de Zachrisson; Costa Rica; Deborah Kessler; Naomi Sasso
2014	Mexico; Paola Longoria; Samantha Salas	Guatemala; Gabriela Martínez; Maria Rodriguez	Colombia; Cristina Amaya; Maria Gomez; Venezuela; Mariana Tabon; Mariana Paredes
2018	Mexico; Paola Longoria; Samantha Salas	Guatemala; Gabriela Martínez; Maria Rodriguez	Costa Rica; Maricruz Ortiz; Melania Sauma; Colombia; Cristina Amaya; Adriana Riveros
2023	Mexico (MEX); Alexandra Herrera; Montserrat Mejía	Centro Caribe Sports (CCS); María Rodríguez; Ana Martínez	Costa Rica (CRC); Jimena Gómez; Maricruz Ortiz Dominican Republic (DOM); Merynanyelly Delgado; Alejandra Jiménez
2026	Mexico (MEX); Alexandra Herrera; Montserrat Mejía	Guatemala (GUA); María Rodríguez; Gabriela Martínez	Costa Rica (CRC); Jimena Gómez; Larissa Faeth Dominican Republic (DOM); Maria Cespedes; Alejandra Jiménez

=== Women's team ===
Year	Gold	Silver	Bronze
1990	Mexico; Diana Almeida; Hilda Rodriguez; Patricia Hernández	Costa Rica; Gloriana Herrera; Andrea Ortiz; Rose Koberg	Dominican Republic; Rosa Gómez; Claudine García
1993	Mexico; Diana Almeida; Hilda Rodriguez; Rosy Torres	Venezuela; Mercedes Valentiner; Matheus Guidmar; Lily Geyer; Valentina Pereira	Costa Rica; Rose Koberg; Andrea Ortiz; Maria Arias
1998	Mexico; Susana Acosta; Maria Torres; Karina Hamilton; Adriana Soto	Venezuela; Mercedes Valentiner; Lily Geyer	Dominican Republic; Claudine García; Karina Saviñón
2002	Mexico; Susana Acosta; Maria Torres; Rosy Torres; Nancy Enriquez	Dominican Republic; Rosa Gómez; Claudine García; Larissa Linás	Puerto Rico; Anna Maldonado; Marta Cañellas
2006	Mexico; Paola Longoria; Susana Acosta; Samantha Salas; Nancy Enriquez	Cuba; Marialis Álvarez; Patricia Balebona; Rosario Dominguez	Dominican Republic; Rosa Gómez; Claudine García; Yira Portes
2010	Mexico; Paola Longoria; Jessica Parrilla; Samantha Salas; Susana Acosta	Dominican Republic; Claudine García; Yira Portes	Puerto Rico; Anna Maldonado; Raquel Pérez; Vivian Rodríguez; Kim Venegas
2014	Mexico; Paola Longoria; Samantha Salas	Guatemala; Gabriela Martínez; Maria Rodriguez	Colombia; Cristina Amaya; Maria Gomez; Venezuela; Mariana Tabon; Mariana Paredes
2018	Mexico; Paola Longoria; Samantha Salas; Alexandra Herrera	Colombia; Cristina Amaya; Adriana Riveros	Costa Rica; Maricruz Ortiz; Melania Sauma; Guatemala; Gabriela Martínez; Maria Rodriguez
2023	Mexico (MEX); Paola Longoria; Montserrat Mejia; Alexandra Herrera	Centro Caribe Sports (CCS); Ana Martinez; Anna Aguilar; Maria Rodriguez	Dominican Republic (DOM); Merynanyelly Delgado; Maria Cespedes; Alejandra Jimenez Costa Rica (CRC); Maricruz Ortiz; Jimena Gomez
2026	Mexico; Montserrat Mejía; Alexandra Herrera; Jessica Parrilla	Guatemala; Gabriela Martínez; María Renée Rodríguez; Andrea Reyes	Costa Rica; Jimena Gómez; Larissa Faeth Dominican Republic; María Jesús Céspedes; Alejandra Jiménez; Luz Moreta

=== Mixed doubles ===
Year	Gold	Silver	Bronze
2023	Mexico (MEX); Eduardo Portillo; Paola Longoria	Centro Caribe Sports (CCS); Ana Martínez; Edwin Galicia	Costa Rica (CRC); Maricruz Ortiz; Andrés Acuña Dominican Republic (DOM); Ramon de León; Maria Céspedes
2026	Costa Rica (CRC); Larissa Faeth; Andrés Acuña	Mexico (MEX); Rodrigo Montoya; Jessica Parrilla	Cuba (CUB); Maykel Moyet Suarez; Ana Cardentey Guatemala (GUA); Maria Renee Rodriguez; Christian Aldana

== Medal tables ==
=== Men's events ===
Rank	Nation	Gold	Silver	Bronze	Total
1	Mexico (MEX)	28	7	2	37
2	Venezuela (VEN)	2	7	7	16
3	Costa Rica (CRC)	0	7	9	16
4	Dominican Republic (DOM)	0	3	9	12
5	Puerto Rico (PUR)	0	3	2	5
6	Guatemala (GUA)	0	2	9	11
7	Colombia (COL)	0	1	4	5
8	Cuba (CUB)	0	0	4	4
9	Belize (BIZ)	0	0	1	1
9	Panama (PAN)	0	0	1	1
Totals (10 entries)		30	30	48	108

=== Women's events ===
Rank	Nation	Gold	Silver	Bronze	Total
1	Mexico (MEX)	28	4	6	38
2	Dominican Republic (DOM)	1	7	13	21
3	Puerto Rico (PUR)	1	0	7	8
4	Guatemala (GUA)	0	10	4	14
5	Costa Rica (CRC)	0	3	10	13
6	Venezuela (VEN)	0	3	4	7
7	Cuba (CUB)	0	2	0	2
8	Colombia (COL)	0	1	4	5
Totals (8 entries)		30	30	48	108

=== Mixed events ===
Rank	Nation	Gold	Silver	Bronze	Total
1	Mexico (MEX)	1	1	0	2
2	Costa Rica (CRC)	1	0	1	2
3	Guatemala (GUA)	0	1	1	2
4	Cuba (CUB)	0	0	1	1
4	Dominican Republic (DOM)	0	0	1	1
Totals (5 entries)		2	2	4	8

Note: Guatemalan born players competed as Centro Caribe Sports at the 2023 Central American and Caribbean Games, but their medals are added to Guatemala in the above tables.

=== Players who have won 5 or more medals ===
Rank	Name	Gold	Silver	Bronze	Total
1	(Dominican Republic) Claudine Garcia	1	7	6	14
2	(Guatemala) Ana Gabriela Martinez	0	11	2	13
3	(Mexico) Paola Longoria	12	0	0	12
3	(Mexico) Javier Moreno	12	0	0	12
3	(Mexico) Álvaro Beltrán	10	1	1	12
3	(Costa Rica) Andrés Acuña	1	5	6	12
7	(Venezuela) Fabian Balmori	2	6	3	11
8	(Mexico) Samantha Salas	8	1	0	9
8	(Guatemala) Maria Renee Rodriguez	0	7	2	9
8	(Venezuela) Jorge Hirsekorn	0	6	3	9
8	(Venezuela) César Castro	0	2	7	9
12	(Dominican Republic) Luis Pérez	0	3	5	8
12	(Puerto Rico) Anna Maldonado	1	0	7	8
14	(Mexico) Alexandra Herrera	6	0	1	7
14	(Mexico) Rodrigo Montoya	5	2	0	7
14	(Mexico) Susana Acosta	6	0	1	7
17	(Mexico) Eduardo Portillo	5	1	0	6
17	(Mexico) Gilberto Mejia	5	1	0	6
17	(Costa Rica) Felipe Camacho	0	4	2	6
17	(Costa Rica) Maricruz Ortiz	0	0	6	6
21	(Mexico) Montserrat Mejia	4	1	0	5
21	(Mexico) Daniel de la Rosa	4	1	0	5
21	(Colombia) Cristina Amaya	0	1	4	5
21	(Guatemala) Manolo Benfeldt	0	1	4	5
21	(Guatemala) Gustavo Morales	0	1	4	5
