= Swimming at the 2006 Central American and Caribbean Games – Men's 200 metre individual medley =

The men's 200m Individual Medley (or "I.M.") event at the 2006 Central American and Caribbean Games occurred on Saturday, July 22, 2006, at the S.U. Pedro de Heredia Aquatic Complex in Cartagena, Colombia.

Records at the time of the event were:

- World Record: 1:55.94, Michael Phelps (USA), Baltimore, MD, USA, August 9, 2003.
- Games Record: 2:05.59, Diego Urretra (Mexico), 2002 Games in San Salvador (Nov.29.2002).

== Results ==
=== Final ===
Place	Swimmer	Country	Time	Note
1	Bradley Ally	Barbados	2:02.98	GR
2	Jeremy Knowles	Bahamas	2:04.51	
2	Shaune Fraser	Cayman Islands	2:04.51	NR
4	Nicholas Bovell	Trinidad and Tobago	2:06.01	
5	Juan Veloz	Mexico	2:06.89	
6	Diego Bonilla	Colombia	2:07.96	
7	Leopoldo Jose Andara Gonzalez	Venezuela	2:08.47	
8	Omar Pinzón	Colombia	2:09.28	

=== Preliminaries ===
Rank	Swimmer	Country	Time	Note
1	Juan Veloz	Mexico	2:06.55	Q
2	Shaune Fraser	Cayman Islands	2:06.80	Q
3	Bradley Ally	Barbados	2:07.06	Q
4	Diego Bonilla	Colombia	2:07.42	Q
5	Jeremy Knowles	Bahamas	2:07.67	Q
6	Omar Pinzón	Colombia	2:07.74	Q
7	Nicholas Bovell	Trinidad and Tobago	2:07.97	Q
8	Leopoldo Jose Andara Gonzalez	Venezuela	2:08.68	Q
9	Pablo Ricardo Marmolejo Vargas	Mexico	2:09.24	
10	Juan Francisco Montenegro Abascal	Guatemala	2:10.26	
11	Juan Ramon Lopez Valladares	Honduras	2:11.58	
12	Morgan Locke	Virgin Islands	2:12.93	
13	Branden Whitehurst	Virgin Islands	2:17.34	
14	Dominic Lee	Jamaica	2:23.01	
--	Rodion Davelaar	Netherlands Antilles	DNS	
--	Rohan Ian Pinto Ramnarine	Venezuela	DNS	
--	Brett Fraser	Cayman Islands	DQ	
