= Swimming at the 2006 Central American and Caribbean Games – Men's 200 metre backstroke =

The men's 200m Backstroke event at the 2006 Central American and Caribbean Games occurred on Monday, July 17, 2006, at the S.U. Pedro de Heredia Aquatic Complex in Cartagena, Colombia.

== Records ==
World Record	Aaron Peirsol (USA)	1:54.66	2005-05-29	(Canada) Montreal
CAC Record	Neisser Bent (CUB)	2:01.53	1998-08-11	(Venezuela) Maracaibo

== Results ==
=== Final ===
Place	Swimmer	Country	Time	Note
1	Nicholas Neckles	Barbados	2:00.85	GR, NR
2	Omar Pinzón	Colombia	2:03.60	
3	David Rodriguez	Cuba	2:05.37	
4	Miguel Robles	Mexico	2:05.45	
5	Nicholas Bovell	Trinidad and Tobago	2:06.62	
6	Guillermo Ramírez	Colombia	2:06.81	
7	Reymer Vezga	Venezuela	2:07.15	
8	Kieran Locke	Virgin Islands	2:09.77	

=== Preliminaries ===
Rank	Swimmer	Country	Time	Note
1	Nicholas Neckles	Barbados	2:03.37	Q
2	Omar Pinzón	Colombia	2:05.82	Q
3	Miguel Robles	Mexico	2:06.79	Q
4	David Rodriguez	Cuba	2:07.67	Q
5	Nicholas Bovell	Trinidad and Tobago	2:07.81	Q
6	Reymer Vezga	Venezuela	2:08.00	Q
7	Guillermo Ramírez	Colombia	2:08.27	Q
8	Kieran Locke	Virgin Islands	2:10.66	Q
9	Francisco Montenegro	Guatemala	2:11.53	
10	José Enrique Bayata	Mexico	2:12.29	
11	Mario Montoya	Costa Rica	2:12.86	
12	Brett Fraser	Cayman Islands	2:14.06	
--	Shaune Fraser	Cayman Islands	DNS	
