= Swimming at the 2006 Central American and Caribbean Games – Men's 100 metre backstroke =

The men's 100m Backstroke event at the 2006 Central American and Caribbean Games occurred on Friday, July 21, 2006, at the S.U. Pedro de Heredia Aquatic Complex in Cartagena, Colombia.

== Records ==
World Record	Aaron Peirsol (USA)	53.17	2005-04-02	(United States) Indianapolis
CAC Record	Rodolfo Falcón (CUB)	56.00	1998-08-13	(Venezuela) Maracaibo

== Results ==
=== Final ===
Place	Swimmer	Country	Time	Note
1	Nicholas Neckles	Barbados	56.57	NR
2	Omar Pinzón	Colombia	57.70	
3	Nicholas Bovell	Trinidad and Tobago	58.00	
4	David Rodriguez	Cuba	58.38	
5	Jose Bayata	Mexico	58.59	
6	Reymer Vezga	Venezuela	58.66	
7	Guillermo Ramírez	Colombia	59.17	
8	Shawn Clarke	Barbados	1:00.36	

=== Preliminaries ===
Rank	Swimmer	Country	Time	Note
1	Nicholas Neckles	Barbados	57.59	Q
2	Omar Pinzón	Colombia	58.47	Q
3	Nicholas Bovell	Trinidad and Tobago	58.56	Q
4	David Rodriguez	Mexico	58.71	Q
5	Jose Bayata	Mexico	58.79	Q
6	Reymer Vezga	Venezuela	58.93	Q
7	Guillermo Ramírez	Colombia	59.80	Q
8	Shawn Clarke	Barbados	1:00.72	Q
9	Mario Montoya	Costa Rica	1:01.00	NR
10	Francisco Montenegro	Guatemala	1:01.12	
11	Kieran Locke	Virgin Islands	1:01.19	
12	Brett Fraser	Cayman Islands	1:01.35	
--	Marcelino Richaards	Suriname	DNS	
--	Javier Hernández	Honduras	DNS	
--	Onan Orlando Thom	Guyana	DNS	
--	Miguel Robles	Mexico	DNS	
--	Jonathon Wong	Jamaica	DNS	
