= Swimming at the 2006 Central American and Caribbean Games – Men's 50 metre backstroke =

The Men's 50m Backstroke event at the 2006 Central American and Caribbean Games occurred on Thursday, July 20, 2006, at the S.U. Pedro de Heredia Aquatic Complex in Cartagena, Colombia.

== Records ==
World Record	Thomas Rupprath (GER)	24.80	2003-07-27	Barcelona, Spain

== Results ==
=== Final ===
Place	Swimmer	Country	Time	Note
1	Nicholas Neckles	Barbados	26.44	GR
2	Omar Pinzón	Colombia	26.74	
3	Nicholas Bovell	Trinidad and Tobago	26.82	
4	Jose Bayata	Mexico	27.32	
5	Ricardo Busquets	Puerto Rico	27.42	
6	David Rodriguez	Cuba	27.46	
7	Shawn Clarke	Barbados	27.74	
8	Reymer Vezga	Venezuela	27.84	

=== Preliminaries ===
Rank	Swimmer	Country	Time	Note
1	Nicholas Neckles	Barbados	26.61	Q
2	Nicholas Bovell	Trinidad and Tobago	27.04	Q
3	Omar Pinzón	Colombia	27.21	Q
4	Ricardo Busquets	Puerto Rico	27.28	Q, NR
5	Jose Bayata	Mexico	27.34	Q
6	Shawn Clarke	Barbados	27.48	Q
7	David Rodriguez	Cuba	27.53	Q
8	Reymer Vezga	Venezuela	27.54	Q
9	Guillermo Ramírez	Colombia	27.59	
10	Albert Subirats	Venezuela	27.63	
11	Onan Orlando Thom	Guyana	28.08	
12	Kieran Locke	Virgin Islands	28.38	
13	Mario Montoya	Costa Rica	28.43	
14	Gustavo Guadalupe	Puerto Rico	28.49	
15	Cesar Uribe	Mexico	28.50	
16	Brett Fraser	Cayman Islands	28.66	
17	Francisco Montenegro	Guatemala	28.98	
18	Jonathan Calderon	Saint Lucia	29.12	
19	Horacio Carcamo	Honduras	29.46	
20	Marcelino Richaards	Suriname	30.28	
21	Jonathon Wong	Jamaica	30.90	
--	Josh Laban	Virgin Islands	DNS	
