= Racquetball at the 2010 Central American and Caribbean Games =

Event held in Mayagüez, Puerto Rico

- Venue: RUM Racquetball Courts
- Dates: 20–26 July
- Nations: 8

The Racquetball competition at the 2010 Central American and Caribbean Games was held in Mayagüez, Puerto Rico.

The tournament was held from 20 to 26 July at the RUM Racquetball Courts in Mayagüez.

== Medal summary ==
=== Men's events ===
Event	Gold	Silver	Bronze
Singles	Álvaro Beltrán (MEX)	Gilberto Mejia (MEX)	César Castro (VEN); Simón Perdomo (DOM)
Doubles	Mexico; Javier Moreno; Polo Gutiérrez	Dominican Republic; Luis Pérez; Simón Perdomo	Costa Rica; Felipe Camacho; Teobaldo Fumero; Venezuela; Fabian Balmori; Jorge Hirsekorn
Team	Mexico; Álvaro Beltrán, Gilberto Mejía; Javier Moreno; Polo Gutierrez	Dominican Republic; Luis Pérez; Simón Perdomo	Venezuela; César Castro; Marcelo Laprea; Fabian Balmori; Jorge Hirsekorn

=== Women's events ===
Event	Gold	Silver	Bronze
Singles	Paola Longoria (MEX)	Claudine García (DOM)	Anna Maldonado (PUR); Jessica Parrilla (MEX)
Doubles	Mexico; Samantha Salas; Susana Acosta	Dominican Republic; Claudine García; Yira Portes	Guatemala; Marie Gomar; Luci Zachrisson); Costa Rica; Deborah Kessler; Naomi Sasso
Team	Mexico; Paola Longoria; Jessica Parrilla; Samantha Salas; Susana Acosta	Dominican Republic; Claudine García; Yira Portes	Puerto Rico; Anna Maldonado; Raquel Pérez; Vivian Rodríguez; Kim Venegas

=== Medals table ===
Rank	Nation	Gold	Silver	Bronze	Total
1	Mexico (MEX)	6	1	1	8
2	Dominican Republic (DOM)	0	5	1	6
3	Venezuela (VEN)	0	0	3	3
4	Costa Rica (CRC)	0	0	2	2
4	Puerto Rico (PUR)	0	0	2	2
6	Guatemala (GUA)	0	0	1	1
Totals (6 entries)		6	6	10	22

== Result Summaries ==
=== Men's singles ===
Semi-finals
July 25 – RUM Racquetball Courts
(Mexico) Gilberto Mejía	15, 15
(Venezuela) César Castro	6, 7
July 25 – RUM Racquetball Courts
(Mexico) Álvaro Beltrán	15, 15
(Dominican Republic) Simón Perdomo	4, 3

Final
July 26 – RUM Racquetball Courts
(Mexico) Gilberto Mejia	2, 0 RET
(Mexico) Álvaro Beltrán	15, 15

=== Men's doubles ===
Semi-finals
July 25 – RUM Racquetball Courts
Mexico	15, 15
Venezuela	3, 0 RET
July 25 – RUM Racquetball Courts
Dominican Republic	15, 15
Costa Rica	10, 5

Final
July 26 – RUM Racquetball Courts
Mexico	15, 15
Dominican Republic	2, 1

=== Women's singles ===
Semi-finals
July 25 – RUM Racquetball Courts
(Mexico) Paola Longoria	15, 15
(Puerto Rico) Anna Maldonado	3, 8
July 25 – RUM Racquetball Courts
(Mexico) Jessica Parrilla	7, 14
(Dominican Republic) Claudine García	15, 15

Final
July 26 – RUM Racquetball Courts
(Mexico) Paola Longoria	15, 15
(Dominican Republic) Claudine García	2, 8

=== Women's doubles ===
Semi-finals
July 25 – RUM Racquetball Courts
Mexico	15, 15
Guatemala	0, 2
July 25 – RUM Racquetball Courts
Costa Rica	8, 8
Dominican Republic	15, 15

Final
July 26 – RUM Racquetball Courts
Mexico	15, 15
Dominican Republic	0, 0 WO
