= Racquetball at the 2002 Central American and Caribbean Games =

Racquetball Event held in Santo Domingo, Dominican Republic

- Venue: Pabellón de Racquetbol, Santo Domingo, Dominican Republic
- Competitors: 29 from 9 nations

The Racquetball competition at the 2006 Central American and Caribbean Games was held in Santo Domingo, Dominican Republic rather than the main games site of San Salvador.

== Medal summary ==
=== Men's events ===
Event	Gold	Silver	Bronze
Singles	Gilberto Mejia (MEX)	Álvaro Beltrán (MEX)	Simón Perdomo (DOM); Matthew Anderson (BIZ)
Doubles	Mexico; Javier Moreno; César Guzmán	Puerto Rico; Curtis Winter; Osvaldo García	Guatemala; Manolo Benfeldt; Gustavo Morales; Cuba; Reinheart; César Castro
Team	Mexico; Gilberto Mejia; Álvaro Beltrán; Javier Moreno; César Guzmán	Puerto Rico; Curtis Winter; Osvaldo García	Guatemala; Gustavo Morales; Manolo Benfeldt; Juan Salvatierra; Fernando Sierra

=== Women's events ===
Event	Gold	Silver	Bronze
Singles	Susana Acosta (MEX)	Claudine García (DOM)	Anna Maldonado (PUR); Lupita Torres (MEX)
Doubles	Mexico; Lupita Torres; Nancy Enríquez	Dominican Republic; Claudine García; Rosa Gómez	Puerto Rico; Anna Maldonado; Marta Cañellas; Venezuela; Lily Geyer; Guiomar Matheus
Team	Mexico; Lupita Torres; Nancy Enríquez; Susana Acosta; Rosy Torres	Dominican Republic; Claudine García; Rosa Gómez; Larissa Linás	Puerto Rico; Anna Maldonado; Marta Cañellas

=== Medals table ===
Rank	Nation	Gold	Silver	Bronze	Total
1	Mexico (MEX)	6	1	1	8
2	Dominican Republic (DOM)	0	3	1	4
3	Puerto Rico (PUR)	0	2	3	5
4	Guatemala (GUA)	0	0	2	2
4	Venezuela (VEN)	0	0	2	2
6	Belize (BIZ)	0	0	1	1
Totals (6 entries)		6	6	10	22
