= RUM Racquetball Courts =

Courts at University of Puerto Rico Mayagüez campus

- Canchas de Racquetball
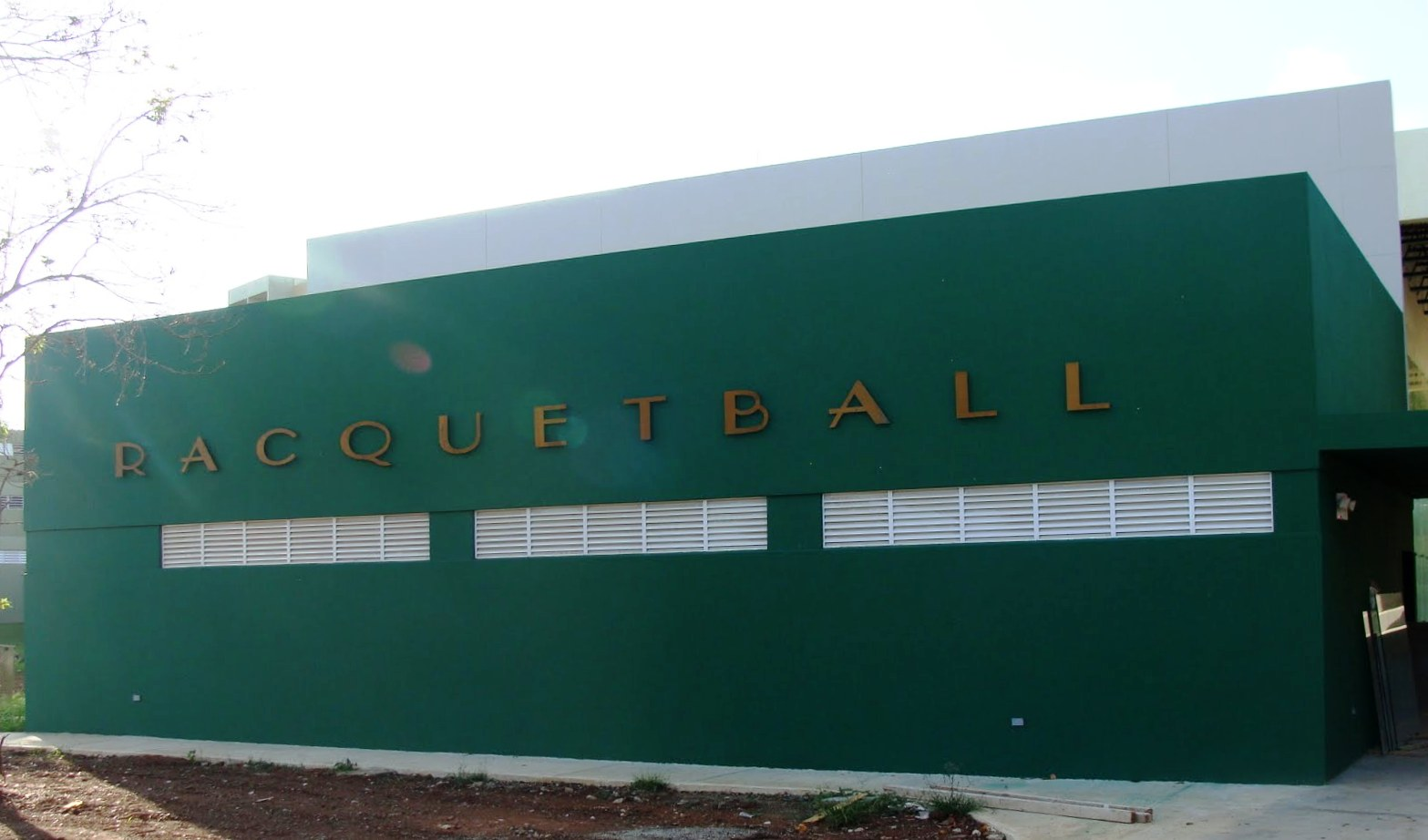
- Interactive map of RUM Racquetball Courts
- Location: UPRM; Barrio Miradero; Mayagüez, Puerto Rico
- Coordinates: 18°12′59.00″N 67°08′40.00″W
- Owner: Autoridad para el Financiamiento de la Infraestructura (AFI)
- Capacity: 800 (Racquetball)
- Surface: Indoors

Construction
- Built: 2010
- Opened: 2010
- Cost: $ 1.2 million

Tenant
- 2010 Central American and Caribbean Games

RUM Racquetball Courts are a Racquetball center on UPRM in Mayagüez, Puerto Rico. Built in 2010 next to the Natatorio RUM. It held the Racquetball competitions of the 2010 Central American and Caribbean Games. The complex has three courts.
