= Miura Brothers Stadium =

Baseball stadium in Hormigueros, Puerto Rico

Coordinates: 18°08′16.41″N 67°07′14.00″W

- Interactive map of Miura Brothers Stadium
- Location: Hormigueros, Puerto Rico
- Capacity: 2,000

Tenant
- Peregrinos de Hormigueros

Miura Brothers Stadium (Spanish: Estadio Hermanos Ernesto y Juan Miura, is a baseball stadium in Hormigueros, Puerto Rico. It hosted some of the baseball games for the 2010 Central American and Caribbean Games.
