= Racquetball at the 2006 Central American and Caribbean Games =

- Venue: Pabellón de Racquetbol, Santo Domingo
- Dates: 20–26 July
- Nations: 8

The Racquetball competition at the 2006 Central American and Caribbean Games was held in Santo Domingo, Dominican Republic rather than the main games site of Cartagena, Colombia.

== Medal summary ==
=== Men's events ===
Event	Gold	Silver	Bronze
Singles	Gilberto Mejia (MEX)	Fabian Balmori (VEN)	César Castro (VEN); Álvaro Beltrán (MEX)
Doubles	Mexico; Javier Moreno; Alejandro Peña	Guatemala; Gustavo Morales; Manolo Benfeldt	Venezuela; Fabian Balmori; Jorge Hirsekorn; Cuba; Raul Martinez; Maikel Moyet
Team	Mexico; Gilberto Mejia; Álvaro Beltrán; Javier Moreno; Alejandro Peña	Venezuela; Fabian Balmori; Jorge Hirsekorn; César Castro	Guatemala; Gustavo Morales; Manolo Benfeldt; Juan Salvatierra; Fernando Sierra

=== Women's events ===
Event	Gold	Silver	Bronze
Singles	Paola Longoria (MEX)	Claudine García (DOM)	Anna Maldonado (PUR); Susana Acosta (MEX)
Doubles	Mexico; Nancy Enriquez; Samantha Salas	Cuba; Patricia Balebona; Rosario Dominguez	Dominican Republic; Claudine García; Rosa Gómez; Guatemala; Jennifer Benfeldt; Lucy de Zachrisson
Team	Mexico; Paola Longoria; Samantha Salas; Susana Acosta; Nancy Enriquez	Cuba; Marialis Alvarez; Patricia Balebona; Rosario Dominguez	Dominican Republic; Claudine García; Rosa Gómez; Yira Portes

=== Medals table ===
Rank	Nation	Gold	Silver	Bronze	Total
1	Mexico (MEX)	6	0	2	8
2	Venezuela (VEN)	0	2	2	4
3	Cuba (CUB)	0	2	1	3
4	Dominican Republic (DOM)	0	1	2	3
4	Guatemala (GUA)	0	1	2	3
6	Puerto Rico (PUR)	0	0	1	1
Totals (6 entries)		6	6	10	22

== Men's Events ==
=== Singles event ===
Semi-finals
(Mexico) Gilberto Mejia	15, 9, 11
(Venezuela) César Castro	12, 15, 6
(Mexico) Álvaro Beltrán	13, 15, 8
(Venezuela) Fabian Balmori	15, 9, 11

Final
(Mexico) Gilberto Mejia	15, 15
(Venezuela) Fabian Balmori	9, 0 (Withdraws with Injury)

=== Doubles event ===
Semi-finals
Mexico	15, 12, 11
Venezuela	6, 12, 1
Guatemala	15, 15
Cuba	7, 7

Final
Mexico	15, 15
Guatemala	7, 4

== Women's Events ==
=== Singles event ===
Semi-finals
(Mexico) Paola Longoria	15, 15
(Puerto Rico) Anna Maldonado	14, 6
(Mexico) Susana Acosta	8, 12
(Dominican Republic) Claudine Garcia	15, 15

Final
(Mexico) Paola Longoria	15, 15
(Dominican Republic) Claudine Garcia	0, 0

=== Doubles event ===
Semi-finals
Mexico	15, 15
Dominican Republic	8, 7
Cuba	15, 3, 11
Guatemala	8, 15, 2

Final
Mexico	7, 15, 11
Cuba	15, 12, 2
