= 2006 Central American and Caribbean Games =

Sports events held in Cartagena, Colombia

XX Central American and Caribbean Games
- Host city: Cartagena
- Country: Colombia
- Motto: Step into history Spanish: Entra a la historia
- Nations: 32
- Athletes: 6,000
- Events: 37
- Opening: July 15, 2006
- Closing: July 30, 2006
- Opened by: Álvaro Uribe
- Athlete's Oath: Cecilia Baena
- Torch lighter: Sergio Núñez Henao
- Main venue: Estadio Pedro de Heredia

The 20th edition of the Central American and Caribbean Games was held in the city of Cartagena, Colombia. The tournament began on July 15 and ended on July 30.

== Host city ==
- Main host cities in Colombia
  - Cartagena de Indias
  - Barranquilla, Colombia (bowling, cycling, football/soccer, and shooting);
  - Bogotá, Colombia (equestrian);
- Satellite Venues
  - Mexico City, Mexico (rowing);
  - Santo Domingo, Dominican Republic (field hockey, modern pentathlon, racquetball and handball).

== Mascots ==
The mascots for the Games were Cata the Indigenous girl and Dani the pelican.

== Nations ==
Participating Nations
Antigua and Barbuda	Netherlands Antilles	Aruba
Bahamas	Barbados	Belize
Bermuda	Colombia (Host)	Costa Rica
Cuba	Dominica	El Salvador
Grenada	Guatemala	Guyana
Haiti	Honduras	Cayman Islands
British Virgin Islands	United States Virgin Islands	Jamaica
Mexico	Nicaragua	Panama
Puerto Rico	Dominican Republic	Saint Kitts and Nevis
Saint Lucia	Saint Vincent and the Grenadines	Suriname
Trinidad and Tobago	Venezuela

== Medal table ==
* Host nation (Colombia)

2006 Central American and Caribbean Games medal table
Rank	Nation	Gold	Silver	Bronze	Total
1	Cuba	138	86	61	285
2	Mexico	107	82	86	275
3	Colombia*	72	70	77	219
4	Venezuela	49	90	124	263
5	Puerto Rico	24	19	53	96
6	Dominican Republic	22	31	44	97
7	Jamaica	9	6	7	22
8	El Salvador	6	12	30	48
9	Barbados	6	2	11	19
10	Guatemala	5	13	30	48
11	Panama	2	5	7	14
12	Costa Rica	2	1	2	5
13	Netherlands Antilles	2	1	1	4
14	Trinidad and Tobago	1	9	11	21
15	Cayman Islands	1	2	0	3
15	Virgin Islands	1	2	0	3
17	Guyana	1	1	0	2
18	British Virgin Islands	1	0	0	1
19	Bahamas	0	6	4	10
20	Haiti	0	5	3	8
21	Honduras	0	2	3	5
22	Grenada	0	2	0	2
23	Saint Kitts and Nevis	0	1	2	3
24	Saint Lucia	0	1	1	2
25	Nicaragua	0	0	4	4
26	Antigua and Barbuda	0	0	1	1
26	Bermuda	0	0	1	1
26	Saint Vincent and the Grenadines	0	0	1	1
26	Suriname	0	0	1	1
Totals (29 entries)		449	449	565	1,463

== Sports ==
There were a total of 39 sports at the games.

- Archery
- Artistic gymnastics
- Athletics
- Badminton
- Baseball
- Basketball
- Beach volleyball
- Bowling
- Boxing
- Canoeing
- Cycling
- Diving
- Equestrian
- Fencing
- Football
- Handball
- Hockey
- Judo
- Karate
- Modern pentathlon
- Racquetball (details)
- Roller skating
- Rowing
- Rhythmic gymnastics
- Sailing
- Shooting
- Softball
- Squash
- Swimming
- Synchronized swimming
- Table tennis
- Taekwondo
- Tennis
- Triathlon
- Volleyball
- Water polo
- Water skiing
- Weightlifting
- Wrestling
