= El Salvador at the 2010 Central American and Caribbean Games =

- IOC code: ESA

in Mayagüez, Puerto Rico July 17, 2010 – August 1, 2010
- Competitors: 274 (151 men and 123 women)
- Flag bearer: Pamela Benítez
- Medals Ranked 9th: Gold 8 Silver 21 Bronze 32 Total 61

Central American and Caribbean Games appearances
- 1930; 1935; 1938; 1946; 1950; 1954; 1959; 1962; 1966; 1970; 1974; 1978; 1982; 1986; 1990; 1993; 1998; 2002; 2006; 2010; 2014; 2018; 2022

El Salvador sent 274 athletes (151 males, 123 females) to the XXIst Central American and Caribbean Games in Mayagüez, Puerto Rico, July 17 - August 1, 2010.

The athletes participated in: Archery (12), Athletics (8), Badminton (2), Beach Volleyball (4), Bowling (9), Boxing (4), Cycling (13), Equestrian (6), Football (soccer) (34), Fencing (22), Gymnastics (8), Handball (28), Judo (11), Karate Do (11), Roller Speed (7), Rowing (12), Sailing (7), Shooting (12), Softball (16), Squash (6), Swimming (5), Table Tennis (8), Taekwondo (8), Tennis (2), Triathlon (1), Weightlifting (9) and Wrestling (9).

== Medalists ==
=== Gold ===
- Jorge Jiménez

=== Bronze ===
- Juan A. Guerra Quiñonez - Swimming (men's 200 breast)
- Pamela Benítez - Swimming (women's 200 free)
- Pamela Benítez - Swimming (women's 400 free)
- Pamela Benítez - Swimming (women's 800 free)

== Results by event ==
=== Swimming ===
- Rafael Alfaro (m)
- Pamela Benítez (f)
- Gabriel Díaz León (m)
- Juan A. Guerra Quiñonez (m)
- Sergio R. Melendez Navas (m)
