= Omar Pinzón =

Colombian swimmer (born 1989)

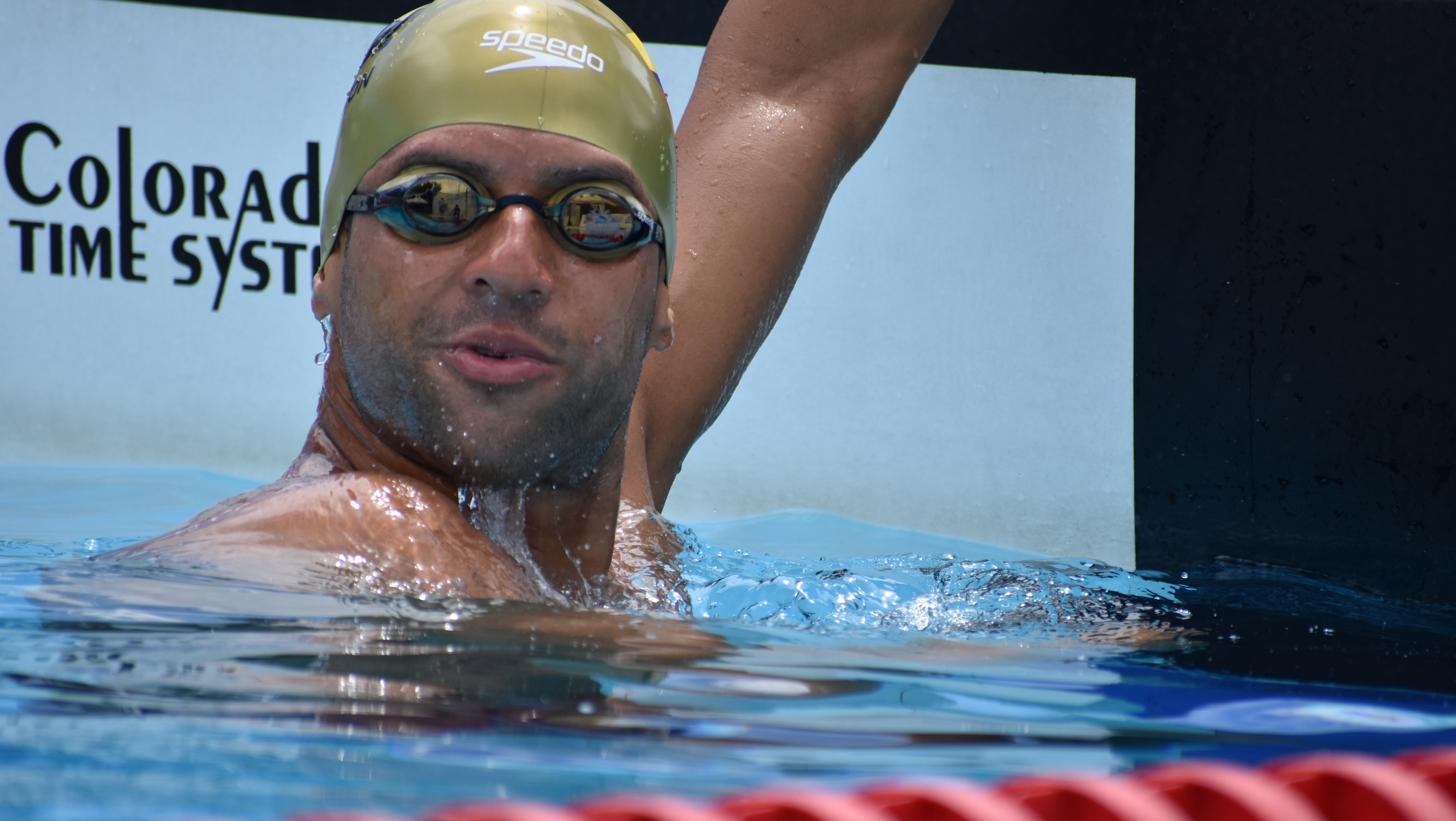
- Colombian Swimmer Omar Pinzon debuts at the Colombian Swimming Nationals in Cucuta May 2017

Personal information
- Full name: Omar Andrés Pinzón García
- National team: Colombia
- Born: June 17, 1989 (age 37) Bogotá, Colombia
- Height: 1.85 m (6 ft 1 in)
- Weight: 85 kg (187 lb)

Sport
- Sport: Swimming
- Strokes: Backstroke; Butterfly; Individual medley
- Club: Deportivo Nautilus
- College team: University of Florida (U.S.)
Medal record
Men's swimming
Representing Colombia
Event	1st	2nd	3rd
World Cup	3	4	4
Pan American Games	0	1	0
CAC Games	9	7	6
South American Games	2	5	5
South American Championships	2	6	12
Bolivarian Games	12	6	3
Total	28	29	30
World Cup
Gold medal – first place	2011 Singapore	200 m backstroke
Gold medal – first place	2011 Beijing	200 m backstroke
Gold medal – first place	2011 Tokyo	200 m backstroke
Silver medal – second place	2010 Rio de Janeiro	200 m backstroke
Silver medal – second place	2016 Doha	200 m backstroke
Silver medal – second place	2016 Singapore	200 m backstroke
Silver medal – second place	2016 Hong Kong	200 m backstroke
Bronze medal – third place	2011 Beijing	50 m backstroke
Bronze medal – third place	2011 Singapore	100 m medley
Bronze medal – third place	2015 Singapore	200 m backstroke
Bronze medal – third place	2016 Dubai	200 m backstroke
Pan American Games
Silver medal – second place	2011 Guadalajara	200 m backstroke
Central American and Caribbean Games
Gold medal – first place	2010 Mayagüez	50 m backstroke
Gold medal – first place	2010 Mayagüez	200 m backstroke
Gold medal – first place	2010 Mayagüez	200 m butterfly
Gold medal – first place	2010 Mayagüez	4×200m freestyle
Gold medal – first place	2014 Veracruz	100 m backstroke
Gold medal – first place	2014 Veracruz	200 m backstroke
Gold medal – first place	2014 Veracruz	200 m medley
Gold medal – first place	2018 Barranquilla	100 m backstroke
Gold medal – first place	2023 San Salvador	100 m backstroke
Silver medal – second place	2006 Cartagena	50 m backstroke
Silver medal – second place	2006 Cartagena	100 m backstroke
Silver medal – second place	2006 Cartagena	200 m backstroke
Silver medal – second place	2014 Veracruz	4×100 m medley
Silver medal – second place	2018 Barranquilla	4×100 m medley
Silver medal – second place	2018 Barranquilla	4×100 m mixed medley
Silver medal – second place	2023 San Salvador	4×100 m mixed medley
Bronze medal – third place	2006 Cartagena	4×200 m freestyle
Bronze medal – third place	2010 Mayagüez	200 m medley
Bronze medal – third place	2010 Mayagüez	4×100 m medley
Bronze medal – third place	2014 Veracruz	4×100 m freestyle
Bronze medal – third place	2018 Barranquilla	200 m backstroke
Bronze medal – third place	2023 San Salvador	200 m backstroke
South American Games
Gold medal – first place	2018 Cochabamba	200 m medley
Gold medal – first place	2018 Cochabamba	4×100 m medley
Silver medal – second place	2018 Cochabamba	100 m backstroke
Silver medal – second place	2022 Asunción	200 m backstroke
Silver medal – second place	2022 Asunción	4×200 m freestyle
Silver medal – second place	2022 Asunción	4×100 m medley
Silver medal – second place	2022 Asunción	4×100 m mixed medley
Bronze medal – third place	2018 Cochabamba	200 m backstroke
Bronze medal – third place	2018 Cochabamba	4×200 m freestyle
Bronze medal – third place	2022 Asunción	50 m backstroke
Bronze medal – third place	2022 Asunción	100 m backstroke
Bronze medal – third place	2022 Asunción	200 m medley
South American Championships
Gold medal – first place	2012 Belém	200 m backstroke
Gold medal – first place	2021 Buenos Aires	200 m backstroke
Silver medal – second place	2006 Medellín	200 m backstroke
Silver medal – second place	2006 Medellín	400 m medley
Silver medal – second place	2012 Belém	100 m backstroke
Silver medal – second place	2016 Asunción	200 m backstroke
Silver medal – second place	2018 Trujillo	100 m backstroke
Silver medal – second place	2021 Buenos Aires	200 m medley
Bronze medal – third place	2004 Maldonado	200 m backstroke
Bronze medal – third place	2006 Medellín	200 m medley
Bronze medal – third place	2012 Belém	50 m backstroke
Bronze medal – third place	2012 Belém	200 m medley
Bronze medal – third place	2012 Belém	4×100 m medley
Bronze medal – third place	2016 Asunción	100 m backstroke
Bronze medal – third place	2016 Asunción	4×200 m freestyle
Bronze medal – third place	2018 Trujillo	50 m backstroke
Bronze medal – third place	2018 Trujillo	4×100 m freestyle
Bronze medal – third place	2018 Trujillo	4×100 m medley
Bronze medal – third place	2018 Trujillo	4×100 m mixed medley
Bronze medal – third place	2021 Buenos Aires	100 m backstroke
Bolivarian Games
Gold medal – first place	2005 Armenia-Pereira	100 m backstroke
Gold medal – first place	2005 Armenia-Pereira	200 m backstroke
Gold medal – first place	2009 Sucre	200 m backstroke
Gold medal – first place	2009 Sucre	200 m medley
Gold medal – first place	2017 Santa Marta	100 m backstroke
Gold medal – first place	2017 Santa Marta	200 m backstroke
Gold medal – first place	2017 Santa Marta	4×100 m mixed medley
Gold medal – first place	2022 Valledupar	100 m backstroke
Gold medal – first place	2022 Valledupar	200 m backstroke
Gold medal – first place	2022 Valledupar	200 m medley
Gold medal – first place	2022 Valledupar	4×100 m medley
Gold medal – first place	2022 Valledupar	4×100 m mixed medley
Silver medal – second place	2005 Armenia-Pereira	200 m medley
Silver medal – second place	2005 Armenia-Pereira	4×200 m freestyle
Silver medal – second place	2005 Armenia-Pereira	4×100 m medley
Silver medal – second place	2009 Sucre	400 m medley
Silver medal – second place	2017 Santa Marta	4×200 m freestyle
Silver medal – second place	2017 Santa Marta	4×100 m medley
Bronze medal – third place	2005 Armenia-Pereira	200 m butterfly
Bronze medal – third place	2009 Sucre	100 m backstroke
Bronze medal – third place	2009 Sucre	200 m butterfly

Omar Andrés Pinzón García (born June 17, 1989) is a competitive swimmer who represented Colombia at the 2004 Olympics in Athens, Greece and 2008 Olympics in Beijing, China. Pinzón attended college in the United States, where he swam for the University of Florida.

At the 2004 Summer Olympics in Athens, Pinzón finished in thirty-fifth place in the men's 200-meter backstroke. Pinzón competed at the 2008 Summer Olympics in Beijing in the 100 and 200-meter backstroke, the 200 and 400-meter individual medley, and the 200-meter butterfly. His best 2008 Olympic performance was in the 200-meter backstroke, where he placed seventeenth with a time of 1:59.11.

Pinzón was born in Bogotá, Distrito Capital, Colombia. He attended The Bolles School in Jacksonville, Florida, and graduated from Gimnasio Britanico high school in Chía in 2005. Pinzón received an athletic scholarship to attend the University of Florida in Gainesville, Florida, where he swam for coach Gregg Troy's Florida Gators swimming and diving team in National Collegiate Athletic Association (NCAA) competition from 2006 to 2010. In his four-year Gator swimming career, Pinzón received twelve All-American honors.

Pinzón won his first gold medal at a Swimming World Cup in Singapore in 2011 in the 200-meter backstroke. Pinzón then won gold medals in Shanghai and Tokyo in the 200-meter backstroke.

Pinzón tested positive for cocaine in November 2012 and was subsequently banned from competing for two years. In 2014, however, after an appeal to the Court of Arbitration for Sport, the suspension was overturned due to several inconsistencies in the testing process. He returned to the competition in 2014 to represent his country at the Central American and Caribbean Games.

== See also ==
- Florida Gators
- List of University of Florida alumni
- List of University of Florida Olympians
