= David H. Chafey Jr. =

Puerto Rican businessman

David H. Chafey Jr. is a business executive and the current chairman of the board of the Puerto Rico Government Development Bank. Before the GDB, Chafey was the Chief Operating Officer of Popular, Inc. and former President of Banco Popular de Puerto Rico. Chafey is a member of the Caribbean Business Hall of Fame in recognition of him being named one of Puerto Rico's Top Ten Business Leaders for the fifth year in a row in 2008.

== Career ==
Chafey began his career at Banco Popular in 1980 as vice president of the Investment Division and became senior vice president of the Investment Group in 1985. He was appointed CFO in 1990, in charge of the Financial Management Group, senior executive vice president in charge of Retail Banking Group in 1995, and president of Banco Popular de Puerto Rico in 2004. In 2009, he was appointed president and chief operating officer of Popular, Inc. serving in such capacity until 2010.

He currently serves on the Board of Directors of Triple S Management, Indulac and the Puerto Rico Dairy Industry Development Fund, and is chairman of the board for the Puerto Rico Open a PGA Tour tournament.

During his career he has served on numerous boards of directors, including Popular, Inc., VISA Latin American and Caribbean, and VISA International. He has been chairman of the Board of the Puerto Rico Telephone Company, Grupo Guayacán, the Government Development Bank for Puerto Rico and several investment funds. He also served in the Board of Directors of family corporations in the Dominican Republic and México.

Mr. Chafey is a board member of San Jorge's Children Foundation and of Colegio San Ignacio's Advisory Committee and served as trustee for Fairfield University and the Ponce School of Medicine.

== Education ==
Chafey received his bachelor's degree in finance from the Fairfield University Dolan School of Business and master of business administration from the New York University Stern School of Business.

== See also ==
- List of Puerto Ricans
