= Cayman Islands at the 2010 Central American and Caribbean Games =

- IOC code: CAY

in Mayagüez, Puerto Rico July 17, 2010 – August 1, 2010
- Competitors: 39 (33 men and 6 women) in 8 sports
- Medals Ranked 14th: Gold 2 Silver 2 Bronze 3 Total 7

Central American and Caribbean Games appearances
- 1993; 1998; 2002; 2006; 2010; 2014; 2018; 2022

The Cayman Islands sent 39 athletes (33 males, 6 females) to the XXIst Central American and Caribbean Games in Mayagüez, Puerto Rico, July 17 - August 1, 2010.

The athletes participated in athletics (10), beach volleyball (2), equestrian (1), karate do (1), rugby (12), sailing (3), squash (4) and swimming (6).

== Medalists ==
=== Gold ===
- Shaune Fraser, Swimming (Men's 200 Free)

=== Silver ===
- Brett Fraser, Swimming (Men's 200 Free)
- Brett Fraser, Swimming (Men's 200 Back)

=== Bronze ===
- Shaune Fraser, Swimming (Men's 100 Free)

== Results by event ==
=== Swimming ===
- Lara Butler (f)
- Summer Flowers (f)
- Tori Flowers (f)
- Brett Fraser (m)
- Shaune Fraser (m)
- Seije Groome (m)
