= Netherlands Antilles at the 2010 Central American and Caribbean Games =

- IOC code: AHO

in Mayagüez, Puerto Rico July 17, 2010 – August 1, 2010
- Competitors: 99 (75 men and 24 women) in 12 sports
- Flag bearer: Anne-Marie Pietersz
- Medals Ranked 13th: Gold 2 Silver 3 Bronze 2 Total 7

Central American and Caribbean Games appearances
- 1946; 1950; 1954; 1959; 1962; 1966; 1970; 1974; 1978; 1982; 1986; 1990; 1993; 1998; 2002; 2006; 2010

The Netherlands Antilles sent 99 athletes (75 males, 24 females) to the XXIst Central American and Caribbean Games in Mayagüez, Puerto Rico, July 17 - August 1, 2010.

The athletes participated in athletics (6), baseball (20), bowling (3), boxing (1), (field) hockey (16), judo (3), karate do (3), sailing (6), shooting (6), softball (17), swimming (3), and water polo (13).

== Medalists ==
=== Silver ===
- Rodion Davelaar, Swimming (Men's 50 Breast)

== Results by event ==
=== Swimming ===
- Hycinth Cijntje (m)
- Rodion Davelaar (m)
- Silvie Ketelaars (f)
