= Racquetball at the 1998 Central American and Caribbean Games =

This page shows the results of the racquetball at the 1998 Central American and Caribbean Games, held on 8 to 17 August 1998 in Maracaibo, Venezuela.

== Medal summary ==
=== Men's events ===
Event	Gold	Silver	Bronze
Singles	Fabian Balmori (VEN)	Gilberto Rodríguez (PUR)	Luis Gómez (CRC)
Doubles	Mexico; Javier Moreno; Ignacio Bustillos	Venezuela; Jorge Hirsekorn; Ralf Reinhard	Guatemala; Gustavo Morales; Manolo Benfeldt
Team	Mexico; Álvaro Beltrán; Ignacio Bustillos; Álvaro Maldonado; Javier Moreno	Venezuela; Fabian Balmori; Jorge Hirsekorn	Puerto Rico; Perry López; Gilberto Rodríguez; Miguel Santiago

=== Women's events ===
Event	Gold	Silver	Bronze
Singles	Anna Maldonado (PUR)	Susana Acosta (MEX)	María Torres (MEX)
Doubles	Mexico; María Torres; Karina Hamilton	Venezuela; Lily Geyer; Mercedes Valentiner	Dominican Republic; Claudine García; Karina Saviñón
Team	Mexico; María Torres; Karina Hamilton; Susana Acosta	Venezuela; Lily Geyer; Mercedes Valentiner	Dominican Republic; Claudine García; Karina Saviñón

=== Medals table ===
Rank	Nation	Gold	Silver	Bronze	Total
1	Mexico (MEX)	4	1	1	6
2	Venezuela (VEN)	1	4	0	5
3	Puerto Rico (PUR)	1	1	1	3
4	Dominican Republic (DOM)	0	0	2	2
5	Costa Rica (CRC)	0	0	1	1
5	Guatemala (GUA)	0	0	1	1
Totals (6 entries)		6	6	6	18
