= 2010 Central American and Caribbean Games =

Sports events hosted in Mayagüez, Puerto Rico

XXI Central American and Caribbean Games
- Logo Mayagüez 2010
- Host city: Mayagüez, Puerto Rico
- Motto: The Games of the People; Spanish: Los Juegos del Pueblo
- Nations: 31
- Athletes: 5,204
- Events: 39 sports
- Opening: 17 July 2010(postponed); 18 July 2010
- Closing: 1 August 2010
- Opened by: Governor Luis Fortuño
- Athlete's Oath: Juanita Rivera
- Judge's Oath: Luis Vallavares
- Torch lighter: Carlos Berrocal, Jorge García, Emily Viqueira, Angel Victor Pagán, Jaime Frontera, Wilfredo Maisonave, Ralph Rodríguez
- Main venue: Estadio Centroamericano de Mayagüez

The 21st Central American and Caribbean Games (Spanish: XXI Juegos Centroamericanos y del Caribe, Mayagüez 2010) took place in Mayagüez, Puerto Rico, from 18 July 2010 to 1 August 2010.

== Bid ==
It was understood that Mayagüez was going to be the only city to ask to hold the games, so that there was going to be no need for a vote in the assembly held in Havana, Cuba in 2004. But the organizers found that Guatemala would present a bid of their own. The vote was held on 15 May 2005 with Mayagüez winning.

2010 Central American and Caribbean Games bidding results
City	Country	CACSO votes
Mayagüez, Puerto Rico	Puerto Rico	22
Guatemala City	Guatemala	16

== Trademark and athletes ==
"Mayagüez 2010" marks the third (3) time Puerto Rico hosts the Central American and Caribbean Games, the other being San Juan in 1966, and Ponce in 1993. The city of Mayagüez had been selected previously to hold the games in 1982, but economic problems forced the city to quit the organization, and the games were held in La Habana, Cuba. A total of 4,965 athletes participated in 39 sports to be held all across Puerto Rico, Colombia, Guatemala, and Guyana.

== Symbols ==
The mascots and the logo for the games were selected unanimously amongst other candidates by a jury in 2007.

Mayi and Magüe

=== Mascots ===
Mayi and Magüe were selected as the mascots for the Games. They are a modern illustration of the Central American flame as a girl and a boy. The colors grant harmony and consistence with Mayagüez 2010's logo. Merchandise including shirts, stuffed animal, stickers and other merchandise has been created with the mascots.

=== Brand logo ===
The official logo, includes two "M" letters, one in green representing the city's hills and the blue one representing the city's pure waters. The double Ms also serve as a flame cauldron, which on top has a flame representing the Olympic flame and the sunset, which also characterizes the city of Mayagüez. The official logo was designed by Abner Gutiérrez and Mayra Maldonado of IDGroup, San Juan PR.

=== Official sports pictograms ===
The official sports pictograms were created inspired in the official logo design. These pictograms were designed by Abner Gutiérrez and Jorge Colón of IDGroup, San Juan PR.

== Organization and reception ==
Initial public reaction noted that the organization of the event would be an important economic injection to the municipality, although the costs of organizing it would be higher that originally expected. Prior to the games, pro-statehood Governor Luis Fortuño pursued restrictions on the Cuban visas pursuant to the Helms–Burton Act. In response, the nation withdrew from the event.

After the project's original budget failed to cover all of the projects, the Mayor of San Juan, Puerto Rico, Jorge Santini, insisted that the aquatics sports should be moved to San Juan Natatorium. This was supported by the Fortuño, who also suggested branching several other sports, including boxing and football, to other municipalities, most of them led by his political party. However, David Bernier, head of Puerto Rico Olympic Committee, decided to not get involved in the controversy, leaving the decision in the hands of Central American and Caribbean Sports Organization (CASCO). Mayagüez's mayor, José Guillermo Rodríguez, firmly opposed this suggestion, citing that the athletes' quarters are located in that municipality, which would mean more investment in security and transportation. In addition Felipe Muñoz, president of the Mexican Olympic Committee and a former swimmer himself, concurred, commenting that "they must swim in Mayagüez" on behalf of a commission sent to represent CASCO.

== Torch relay "Mayagüez 2010" ==
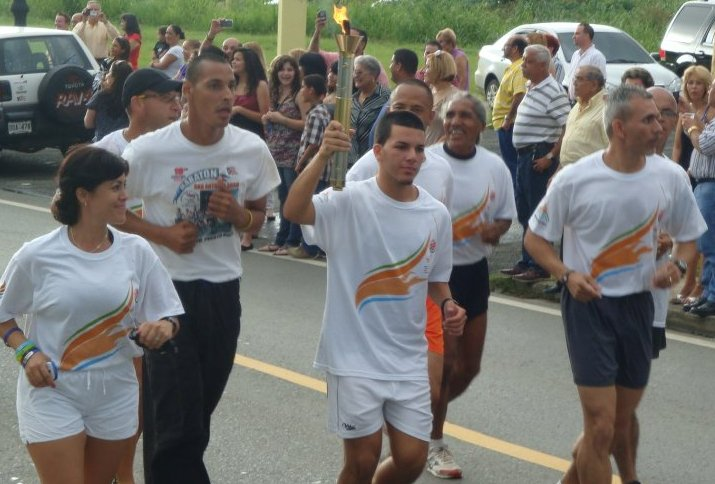
Torch going across Añasco

The Central American and Caribbean flame was lighted on Friday, 25 June 2010, at the Teotihuacán Pyramids in Mexico by indigenous priests. Mexico has the distinction of being the traditional seat of the lighting of the flame for the CAC games since it was the host of the first games in 1926. At the ceremony a Puerto Rican delegation traveled to Mexico, composed of Henry Neumann, secretary of Sports and Recreation, David Bernier, head of Puerto Rico Olympic Committee, Felipe Pérez, president of the organizing Committee and José Guillermo Rodríguez, mayor of Mayagüez.

The flame arrived in Puerto Rico and the torch relay went across all 78 municipalities for 22 days and ended its route on 18 July when the games were inaugurated and the fire was placed at the Central American and Caribbean Games cauldron. The governor of Puerto Rico, Luis Fortuño, received the torch at Rafael Hernández Airport in Aguadilla. The first runner in the relay was Puerto Rican golfer Miguel Suárez. The relay began 27 June and went through Aguada, Rincón, Añasco and Las Marías that day. The next day the relay continued through San Sebastián, Moca, Isabela y Quebradillas. By 6 July the torch reached San Juan, where it was received by Richard Carrion, member of the International Olympic Committee in the Milla de Oro. Accompanying the torch and the different runners was a caravan of different official cars, trucks and buses that followed the torch across the island. On 18 July the flame arrived at the Central American and Caribbean Games in time for the opening ceremony.

== Games ==
=== Opening ceremony ===
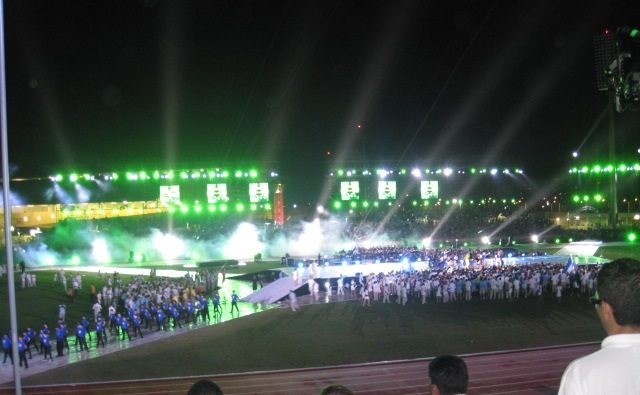
Opening ceremony

Cervecera de Puerto Rico organized a pre-opening act on 15 July 2010 at their renovated facilities in Mayagüez. The act had the participation of Dutch DJ and musician Tiësto as well as several local disc-jockeys.

The official opening ceremony was scheduled to take place on 17 July 2010 at the Mayagüez Central American Stadium. Artists Olga Tañón, Gilberto Santa Rosa and Wisin & Yandel were among some of the performers for the event.

On 17 July 2010, at around 12:00 pm, strong wind gusts in the region caused the collapse of the scaffolding of lights at the Stadium, resulting in property damage and seven people injured. Although witnesses and media reported the event as a tornado or waterspout, the National Weather Service later described it as extremely high winds. Police units, local and state emergency vehicles and paramedics quickly responded to the alert and within minutes had the situation under control. That same afternoon, at 2:30, the organizing committee (COMAZ) of the "Juegos Centroamericanos y del Caribe – Mayagüez 2010" announced at a press conference the postponement of the opening ceremony for the next day, 18 July 2010.

At the opening ceremony, Fortuño (expecting to be booed like Carlos Romero Barceló and Pedro Rosselló before him) decided not to give the protocolary speech and only declared the inauguration of the games. The group Nota sang the Puerto Rico regional anthem in the opening ceremony. After the parade of all delegations, Olga Tañón opened the show with a performance that featured over 30 dancers and a fireworks display. When raising the flag of the city of Mayaguez, the "Mayagüezanos", Chucho Avellanet and Hilda Ramos (soprano-opera singer) sang the anthem of Mayagüez. Jose Guillermo Rodriguez mayor of Mayagüez spoke, followed by Felipe Perez president of the organizing committee, then by Hector Cardona president of ODECABE. Immediately after Hector Cardona finished talking, Luis Fortuño, Governor of Puerto Rico declared the games officially opened. Gilberto Santa Rosa performed, followed by Nestor Torres, then Bernie Williams, and afterward Wisin & Yandel also gave a performance. It was the first time in the history of the Central American and Caribbean Games that athletes parades in an opening ceremony with medals already won.

=== Sports ===
- Archery
- Artistic gymnastics
- Athletics
- Badminton
- Baseball
- Basketball
- Beach volleyball
- Bowling
- Boxing
- Diving
- Equestrian
- Fencing
- Field hockey
- Football
- Handball
- Judo
- Karate
- Canoeing
- Cycling
- Modern pentathlon
- Racquetball
- Rhythmic gymnastics
- Roller skating
- Rowing
- Rugby union
- Sailing
- Shooting
- Softball
- Swimming
- Synchronized swimming
- Squash
- Table tennis
- Taekwondo
- Tennis
- Triathlon
- Volleyball
- Water polo
- Water skiing
- Weightlifting
- Wrestling

=== Closing ceremony ===
The 2010 Central American and Caribbean Games closing ceremony took place on 1 August 2010 on the Estadio Centro Americano. The event began a few hours late because of rain. The event included different musical acts of different musicians. The first musical presentation was by Mayagüezano Chucho Avellanet who performed "Sueño Antillano" with Claudina Brinn. Afterward Ana Isabelle performed her interpretation of the song Wavin' Flag. She was followed by José Nogueras who, accompanied by dozens of dancers sang "Antillano" and "También Centroamericano". Salsa music was also present as Richie Ray & Bobby Cruz performed "Sonido Bestial" and "Mi Bandera". Tito El Bambino also sang "El Amor" and "Te Pido Perdón" as fireworks illuminated the night sky. At the end of the night, Veracruz, host of the 2014 Central American and Caribbean Games gave a performance with interpretation of Mexican artists such as the folkloric ballet of Fandango and Olicia. As part of the Veracruz presentation the Papantla Flyers presented their ritual which has its roots in the pre-Hispanic period.

=== Medal table ===
Mayagüez 2010 Medals

* Host nation (Puerto Rico)

2010 Central American and Caribbean Games medal table
Rank	Nation	Gold	Silver	Bronze	Total
1	Mexico	127	125	123	375
2	Venezuela	116	106	99	321
3	Colombia	104	84	74	262
4	Puerto Rico*	48	43	75	166
5	Dominican Republic	31	38	68	137
6	Jamaica	15	11	16	42
7	Guatemala	14	21	35	70
8	Trinidad and Tobago	9	12	13	34
9	El Salvador	8	21	32	61
10	Bahamas	7	5	6	18
11	Barbados	3	2	5	10
12	Panama	2	3	12	17
13	Netherlands Antilles	2	3	2	7
14	Cayman Islands	2	2	3	7
15	Costa Rica	1	5	18	24
16	Guyana	1	3	6	10
17	Bermuda	1	1	3	5
18	British Virgin Islands	1	0	0	1
18	Saint Lucia	1	0	0	1
20	Haiti	0	2	4	6
21	Virgin Islands	0	2	0	2
22	Aruba	0	1	3	4
23	Antigua and Barbuda	0	1	0	1
23	Grenada	0	1	0	1
25	Nicaragua	0	0	4	4
26	Honduras	0	0	3	3
27	Saint Kitts and Nevis	0	0	2	2
28	Suriname	0	0	1	1
29	Belize	0	0	0	0
29	Dominica	0	0	0	0
29	Saint Vincent and the Grenadines	0	0	0	0
Totals (31 entries)		493	492	607	1,592

== Participant countries ==
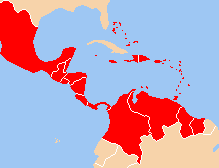
Participant countries

Out of the thirty-two nations that are members of the Central American and Caribbean Sports Organization (CASCO), thirty-one countries participated at the games. Cuba decided not to attend.

Country	Athletes	Sports	Flagbearer
Antigua and Barbuda	15	6	James Grayman
Aruba	32	9	Stuart Achl y Gilbert
Bahamas	78	8	Cynthia Rahming
Barbados	162	23	Bradley Ally
Belize	13	5	Shalini Zabaneh
Bermuda	60	10	Roy Allen Burol
British Virgin Islands	30	7	Darrel Christopher
Cayman Islands	39	8	Jessica McTagart
Colombia	259	32	Natalia Sánchez
Costa Rica	162	30	Verania Willis
Dominica	8	2	Brenda Williams
Dominican Republic	491	38	Brenda Castillo
El Salvador	274	30	Pamela Benítez
Grenada	11	3	Ayesha Noel
Guatemala	420	40	Kevin Cordón
Guyana	66	10	Tricia Fiedtkou
Haiti	69	10	Joseph Moise
Honduras	75	18	Karen Vilorio
Jamaica	170	15	Alia Atkinson
Mexico	681	45	Oscar Valdez
Netherlands Antilles	99	13	Anne-Marie Pietersz
Nicaragua	144	16	Rigoberto Calderón
Panama	171	20	Eileen Grench
Puerto Rico	649	41	Jose Juan Barea
Saint Kitts and Nevis	14	2	Tanika Liburd
Saint Lucia	20	5	Danielle Beaubrun
Saint Vincent and the Grenadines	19	5	
Suriname	14	6	Chinyere Pigot
Trinidad and Tobago	235	24	
Virgin Islands	94	11	
Venezuela	493	38	Mariana González

== Venues ==
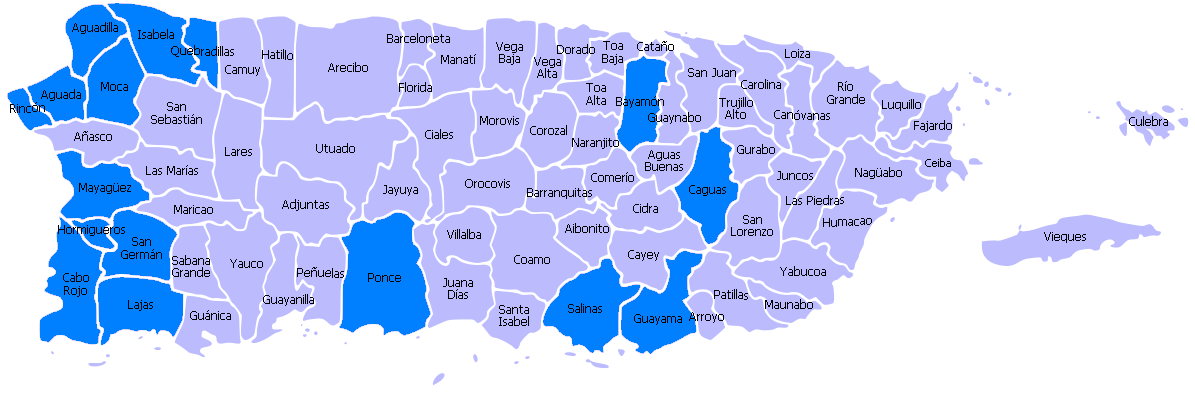
Events were held in the municipalities shaded in darker blue.

Most of the events will be held in the west coast, known as Porta del Sol, with 4 events held elsewhere around the island, five in Colombia, one in Guatemala, and one in Guyana. In order to establish the caliber of the event, Holland Group, the company in charge of the Port of Mayagüez purchased "Birth of a New World", a statue measuring 350 feet in height and depicting Christopher Columbus by Russian-Georgian sculptor Zurab Tsereteli. Although bought a decade earlier by the municipality of Cataño, the monument could not be assembled there due to concerns with air traffic. Tony Jacobs, the port's administrator, explained that after structural evaluation, the group expects to assemble the statue in time for the Central American and Caribbean Games. In their inform to the ODECABE, the project's technical direction presented the advancements in construction as well as the dates of construction and expected completion. The Press Center for the games will be located in the UPRM College of Business Administration building. Some of the most important projects created for the games are the Olimpic Villa and the Parque del Litoral.

=== Mayagüez ===
Venue	Capacity	Sports	Image
Estadio Centro Americano de Mayagüez	13,000	Track and field, Football (soccer)	
RUM Natatorium	3,250	Swimming, Water polo, Synchronized swimming, Diving	
Palacio de Recreación y Deportes	6,000	Basketball, Volleyball	
Isidoro García Stadium	12,000	Baseball	
El Mani Pavilion	2,500	Handball	
Rafael A. Mangual Coliseum	4,500	Boxing	
RUM Racquetball Courts	850	Racquetball	
RUM Tennis Courts	3,250	Tennis	
Santiago Llorens Stadium	900	Softball	

=== Porta del Sol ===
Venue	Municipality	Capacity	Sports
Raymond Dalmau Coliseum	Quebradillas	5,150	Basketball, Badminton
Arquelio Torres Coliseum	San Germán	5,100	Basketball
Miura Brothers Stadium	Hormigueros	2,100	Baseball
Canena Marquez Stadium	Aguadilla	6,000	Baseball
City of Rincón	Rincón	1,000	Cycling
Ramey Base	Aguadilla	900	Cycling
Relin Sosa Athletic Track	Cabo Rojo	3,100	Soccer
Aguada Stadium	Aguada	4,100	Soccer
Hormigueros Gymnastics Pavilion	Hormigueros	900	Artistic gymnastics, Rhythmic gymnastics
Aguada Coliseum	Aguada	5,100	Judo, Wrestling
Wilfredo Toro Field	Hormigueros	1,500	Karate, Taekwondo
Dr. Juan Sanchez Acevedo Coliseum	Moca	3,100	Weightlifting
Julio Rivera Lopez Stadium	Hormigueros	650	Softball
Buga Abreu Coliseum	Isabela	3,100	Taekwondo
Balneario de Rincón	Rincón		Triathlon
Archery Facilities Altos de Samán	Cabo Rojo	600	Archery
Coliseo Rebekah Colberg Cabrera	Cabo Rojo	3,000	Fencing
Balneario de Boqueron	Cabo Rojo		Sailing
Cabo Rojo Beach Volleyball Field	Cabo Rojo	700	Beach volleyball

=== Elsewhere in Puerto Rico ===
Venue	Municipality	Capacity	Sports
Bolera Caribe	Ponce	500	Bowling
Lake Cerrillos	Ponce	2,000	Canoeing, Rowing
La Sebastina	Bayamón	1,100	Equestrian
Yldefonso Sola Morales Stadium	Caguas	10,000	Field hockey
Guayama Convention Center	Guayama	2,100	Roller skating
Albergue Olimpico	Salinas	1,000	Shooting

=== Satellite venues ===
Venue	City	Sports
	Bogotá, Colombia	Water skiing, Rhythmic gymnastics, Trampoline, Squash, Roller skating
	Guatemala City, Guatemala	Modern pentathlon
Providence Stadium	Providence, Guyana	Rugby
Estadio Metropolitano de Mérida	Mérida, Venezuela	Football

== Organizers ==
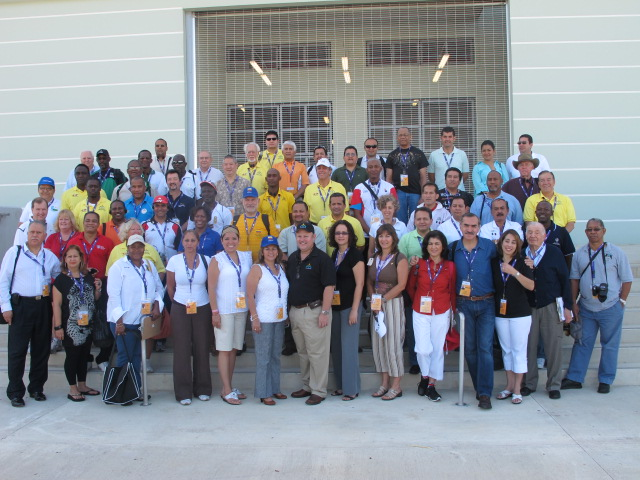
Mission Chiefs of ODACABE Nations in front of the new Cholo Garcia Stadium

Upon the announcement of the celebration of the event in Puerto Rico, David Chafey was selected to preside the organization committee, but Chafey announced his withdrawal from it in January 2008. On 31 January 2008, David Bernier, who at the moment was the island's Secretary of Recreation and Sports, accepted to become president of the committee that was organizing the event. Following his designation, he announced that he would discuss with the mayors of adjacent municipalities. Pedrín Colón was selected to keep the competition's flag in custody during a sailing competition in Mexico. After being certified as president, Bernier began an evaluation stage, measuring the performance of crucial personnel. On 30 June 2008, the committee announced that the Cámara de Comercio del Oeste and Compañía de Comercio y Exportación de Puerto Rico agreed to organize beneficial economic measures for the local establishments.

On 18 December 2008, Bernier, who was now the elected president of the Puerto Rico Olympic Committee (COPUR), announced that the project's public budget was expected to descend from 28.8 million dollars to just 19. In this interview, he also noted that the government was lacking the complete funds required for the project. Due to this, Bernier proposed the establishment of a financing plan, which would have an immediate effect but would be paid in a prolonged manner. Five days later, Bernier announced changes in the executive positions within the project, not discarding his own exclusion due to his new office in the COPUR.

Meanwhile, the group focused on working with the financial proposals which they expected to present to the organization that oversees the Games: the Central American and Caribbean Sports Organization (CASCO) in January 2009. By this point, the committee was planning meetings with popular representatives and had received moral support from the government. On 30 January 2009, CASCO gave the local organizers committee for the Games 60 days to get an estimated $20 million budget for the Games, or risk losing the hosting rights. The funds for the event were officially secured on 19 March 2009.

In March 2009, Bernier abandoned the committee's chair, intending to focus on his role as president of COPUR. His replacement, Felipe Pérez, received unanimous support and took office on 27 April 2009. On 31 January 2008, Aníbal Acevedo Vilá officially announced the construction of several sports facilities, in an activity that counted with music and fireworks.

== Global impact ==
The impact on the economy, social scene and infrastructure of the western region will be staggering and long lasting and that will ultimately be the real legacy of the 2010 Mayagüez Games. The Games closed with a projected gain of $5 million. This money is divided in $2 million that came from the government and will be returned to the General Fund and another $3 million that came from private funds that will be used to create the Mayaguez 2010 Foundation, an organism that will promote Puerto Rico as an important Sport Tourism Destination.

The operational budget for the games ascended to $43,321,851. Of this, the government of Puerto Rico contributed $37,918,200, that were divided in $8,918,200 thru the Department of Sports and Recreation and $29,000,000 by concept of the Law 12 that granted 5% of transit fines to the Games, and the Law 74, that created the Special Fund for the presentation of the Games. The Government also supplied $8,178,301 "in kind", that are non-monetary contributions given in services such as water and electricity that were not charged to COMAZ. Of those funds, there are presently in the "Banco Gubernamental de Fomento" an available balance of $4,967,000 with which will be paid debts up to $2,556,000. Over $2 million will be returned to the General Fund of the government.

It is the first time that a budget for a multi-national event held in Puerto Rico is made and over $2 million are returned to the general government. In other similar events such as Ponce 93 the government had to give more funds after the games were over. Furthermore, income from the private sector was calculated at $4,553,372 and yet the money gained by the private sector ascended to $8,108,326. These funds came from sponsors, trademark licenses, and donations among other things. The games had an economic impact estimated in $1,500 million of which $500 million were in construction projects. This produced 18,110 jobs, of which 8,400 were direct and 9,710 indirect jobs. Likewise, there was an improvement in the unemployment rate from 9.4% in 2007 to 6.6% in December 2009. An economic study by Jose Almeda says that visitors in the Porta del Sol region invested about $90 million in the days that the games lasted.
