= Honduras at the 2010 Central American and Caribbean Games =

- IOC code: HON

in Mayagüez, Puerto Rico July 17, 2010 – August 1, 2010
- Competitors: 75 (57 men and 18 women)
- Flag bearer: Karen Vilorio
- Medals Ranked 26th: Gold 0 Silver 0 Bronze 3 Total 3

Central American and Caribbean Games appearances
- 1930; 1935–1938; 1946; 1950; 1954; 1959; 1962; 1966; 1970; 1974; 1978; 1982; 1986; 1990; 1993; 1998; 2002; 2006; 2010; 2014; 2018; 2022

The XXIst Central American and Caribbean Games were held in Mayagüez, Puerto Rico from July 17, 2010 to August 1, 2010.

== Results by event ==
=== Bowling ===
The women's singles Final for the bowling event took place on 19 July at 8:00 (UTC−04:00), three Honduran athletes participated in this event finishing 7th, 47th and 70th from 72 participants.

R.	Athlete
6	(Puerto Rico) Mariangie Colón
7	(Honduras) Eloina Valle
8	(Mexico) Lilia Robles
46	(Aruba) Thashaina Seraus
47	(Honduras) María Breve
48	(Mexico) María Cornejo
69	(Panama) Karen Holder
70	(Honduras) Marjorie Martínez
71	(The Bahamas) Stephanie Bowe

The men's singles Final for the bowling event took place on 19 July at 17:00 (UTC−04:00), four Honduran athletes participated in this event finishing 41st, 48th, 66th and 71st from 74 participants.

R.	Athlete
40	(Mexico) Daniel Falconi
41	(Honduras) G. Valle
42	(Mexico) Marcos Baeza
47	(Guatemala) Miguel Aguilar
48	(Honduras) Carlos Rojas
49	(Costa Rica) Federico Reyna
64	(The Bahamas) Clarence Wallace
66	(Honduras) C. Araujo
66	(Netherlands Antilles) Tarik Samandar
70	(Panama) Rodrigo Rosales
71	(Honduras) Kendal Laitano
72	(Bermuda) Kevin Swam

The women's doubles Final for the bowling event took place on 20 July at 8:00 (UTC−04:00), two Honduran athletes participated in this event finishing 19th from 70 participants.

R.	Athlete
18	(Panama) Yvette Chen
18	(Panama) Tilcia Chong
19	(Honduras) María Breve
19	(Honduras) Eloina Valle
20	(Dominican Republic) Ana Henríquez
20	(Dominican Republic) Paola Méndez

The mixed doubles Final for the bowling event took place on 21 July at 8:00 (UTC−04:00), six Honduran athletes participated in this event finishing 31st, 43rd and 54th from 132 participants.

R.	Athlete
30	(Venezuela) Ingellimar Contreras
30	(Venezuela) Danny Fung
31	(Honduras) Marjorie Martínez
31	(Honduras) Kendal Laitano
32	(Bermuda) Dianne Jones
32	(Bermuda) Levinc Samuels
42	(Guatemala) Leslie Cuevas
42	(Guatemala) Roberto Rueda
43	(Honduras) Eloina Valle
43	(Honduras) G. Valle
43	(Puerto Rico) M. Ayala
43	(Puerto Rico) Bruno Díaz
53	(The Bahamas) Justina Sturrup
53	(The Bahamas) Orville Forbes
54	(Honduras) María Breve
54	(Honduras) Carlos Rojas
55	(Panama) Karen Holder
55	(Panama) Rodrigo Rosales

The women's trios Final for the bowling event took place on 22 July at 8:00 (UTC−04:00), three Honduran athletes participated in this event finishing 20th from 66 participants.

R.	Athlete
19	(Bermuda) Kathleen Christopher
19	(Bermuda) Rochelle Harvey
19	(Bermuda) Patricia Price
20	(Honduras) María Breve
20	(Honduras) Marjorie Martínez
20	(Honduras) Eloina Valle
21	(Aruba) Suzette Croes
21	(Aruba) Estridita Hernandis
21	(Aruba) Micheline Jeandor

The men's trios Final for the bowling event took place on 22 July at 8:00 (UTC−04:00), three Honduran athletes participated in this event finishing 19th from 71 participants.

R.	Athlete
18	(Bermuda) Damien Matthews
18	(Bermuda) David Maycock
18	(Bermuda) Delmont Tucker
19	(Honduras) Kendal Laitano
19	(Honduras) Carlos Rojas
19	(Honduras) G. Valle
20	(El Salvador) Miguel Arévalo
20	(El Salvador) Rudy Quintanilla
20	(El Salvador) Francisco Sánchez

=== Diving ===
The men's 1M Springboard for the diving event took place on 20 July at 10:30 (UTC−04:00), one Honduran athlete participated in this event finishing 12th from 13 participants. and a 3M meet in which the diver tabled 8th out of 12 participants. Making this the first time any diver from Honduras participates internationally and stands between the first 12.

R.	Athlete
11	(Guatemala) José Rosales
12	(Honduras) Jean Miralda
13	(Costa Rica) Johan Rojas

R.	Athlete
8	(Honduras) Jean Miralda
9	(Guatemala) José Rosales
10	(Costa Rica) Johan Rojas

=== Fencing ===
The men's individual sabre for the fencing event took place on 20 July, one Honduran athlete participated in this event finishing 9th from 12 participants.

R.	Athlete
5	(Mexico) Manuel Sánchez
5	(Dominican Republic) Rafael Western
5	(El Salvador) Joaquín Tobar
5	(El Salvador) John López
9	(Honduras) Marco Izaguirre
9	(Guatemala) Edgar Arriola
9	(Puerto Rico) Francisco Valentín
9	(Guatemala) Jerson Salguero

=== Judo ===
The women's -63 kg for the judo event took place on 19 July, one Honduran athlete participated in this event finishing 7th from 8 participants.

R.	Athlete
7	(El Salvador) Karla Catota
7	(Honduras) Sergia Cuti

The men's -73 kg for the judo event took place on 19 July, one Honduran athlete participated in this event finishing 5th from 8 participants.

R.	Athlete
5	(Guatemala) Otto Menegazzo
5	(Honduras) Kevin Fernández

The men's -60 kg for the judo event took place on 20 July at 10:00 (UTC−04:00), one Honduran athlete participated in this event finishing 7th from 8 participants.

R.	Athlete
5	(Dominican Republic) Wander Mateo
5	(Guatemala) Douglas Arévalo
7	(Honduras) Keny Godoy
7	(Haiti) Neslain Charles

=== Racquetball ===
The women's Preliminary round singles for the racquetball event took place on 20 July at 10:00 (UTC−04:00), Pamela Sierra from Honduras faced Yira Portes from Dominican Republic.

R.	Athlete	S.
1	(Honduras) Pamela Sierra	2
2	(Dominican Republic) Yira Portes	1

The men's Preliminary round singles for the racquetball event took place on 20 July at 12:00 (UTC−04:00), Selvin Cruz from Honduras faced Adolfo Orellana from Costa Rica.

R.	Athlete	S.
1	(Costa Rica) Adolfo Orellana	2
2	(Honduras) Selvin Cruz	0

The men's Preliminary round doubles for the racquetball event took place on 20 July at 16:00 (UTC−04:00), Selvin Cruz and Raúl Banegas from Honduras faced Felipe Camacho and Teobaldo Fumero from Costa Rica.

R.	Athlete	S.
1	(Costa Rica) F. Camacho / T. Fumero	2
2	(Honduras) R. Banegas / S. Cruz	0

The men's Preliminary round singles for the racquetball event took place on 21 July at 10:00 (UTC−04:00), Raúl Banegas from Honduras faced Simón Perdomo from Dominican Republic.

R.	Athlete	S.
1	(Dominican Republic) Simón Perdomo	2
2	(Honduras) Raúl Banegas	0

The men's Preliminary round singles for the racquetball event took place on 21 July at 10:42 (UTC−04:00), Selvin Cruz from Honduras faced Luis Pérez from Dominican Republic.

R.	Athlete	S.
1	(Dominican Republic) Luis Perez	2
2	(Honduras) Selvin Cruz	0

The women's Preliminary round singles for the racquetball event took place on 21 July at 13:30 (UTC−04:00), Pamela Sierra from Honduras faced Jessica Parrilla from Mexico.

R.	Athlete	S.
1	(Mexico) Jessica Parrilla	2
2	(Honduras) Pamela Sierra	0

=== Shooting ===
The men's qualification for 10M Air Pistol for the shooting event took place on 18 July at 12:30 (UTC−04:00), two Honduran athletes participated in this event finishing 19th and 25th from 32 participants.

R.	Athlete
18	(El Salvador) Carlos Hernández
19	(Honduras) Alberto Henríquez
20	(Costa Rica) Roberto Herrera
24	(Costa Rica) Ying Cheng
25	(Honduras) Christian Herrera
26	(Dominican Republic) Luis Lebrón

The women's qualification for 10M Air Pistol for the shooting event took place on 18 July at 14:00 (UTC−04:00), one Honduran athlete participated in this event finishing 8th from 27 participants.

R.	Athlete
7	(Mexico) Rosa Zúñiga
8	(Honduras) Claudia Fajardo
9	(Colombia) Amanda Mondol

The men's qualification for 10M Air Rifle for the shooting event took place on 20 July at 14:30 (UTC−04:00), one Honduran athlete participated in this event finishing 19th from 23 participants.

R.	Athlete
18	(Barbados) Gerard Agustin
19	(Honduras) Manuel Villeda
20	(Barbados) Marlon Best

The men's qualification for 50M Pistol for the shooting event took place on 21 July at 8:30 (UTC−04:00), two Honduran athletes participated in this event finishing 22nd from 27 participants.

R.	Athlete
21	(Puerto Rico) Luis Pagán
22	(United States Virgin Islands) Kurt Isherwood
22	(El Salvador) Carlos Aguilar
22	(Honduras) Christian Herrera
22	(Nicaragua) Norman Ortega
22	(Honduras) Alberto Henríquez

=== Swimming ===
The Preliminary round for men's 100M Freestyle for the swimming event took place on 18 July at 9:02 (UTC−04:00), one Honduran athlete participated in this event finishing 1st from 6 participants.

R.	Athlete
1	(Honduras) Allan Gutiérrez
2	(Jamaica) Russell Forte
3	(Dominican Republic) Rafael Rodríguez

The Preliminary round for men's 200M Butterfly for the swimming event took place on 18 July at 9:19 (UTC−04:00), two Honduran athletes participated in this event finishing 4th and 6th from 7 participants.

R.	Athlete
3	(Colombia) Julio Galofre
4	(Honduras) Javier Hernández
5	(Puerto Rico) Raúl Garrastazu
6	(Honduras) Roy Barahona
7	(United States Virgin Islands) Bryson Mays

The Preliminary round for women's 200M Breaststroke for the swimming event took place on 18 July at 9:29 (UTC−04:00), one Honduran athlete participated in this event finishing 5th from 7 participants.

R.	Athlete
4	(Saint Lucia) Danielle Beaubrun
5	(Honduras) Karen Vilorio
6	(Dominican Republic) Penélope Cruz

The Final round for men's 1500M Freestyle for the swimming event took place on 18 July at 9:35 (UTC−04:00), one Honduran athlete participated in this event finishing 4th from 4 participants.

R.	Athlete
3	(Jamaica) Dominic Walter
4	(Honduras) Luis Martorell

The Preliminary round for women's 50M Butterfly for the swimming event took place on 19 July at 9:04 (UTC−04:00), two Honduran athletes participated in this event finishing 6th and 8th from 8 participants.

R.	Athlete
5	(Jamaica) Kendese Nangle
6	(Honduras) Laura Paz
7	(Suriname) Nishani Cicilson
8	(Honduras) Ana Euceda

The Preliminary round for women's 50M Backstroke for the swimming event took place on 19 July at 9:18 (UTC−04:00), one Honduran athlete participated in this event finishing 8th from 8 participants.

R.	Athlete
7	(Jamaica) Kendese Nangle
8	(Honduras) Karen Vilorio

The Preliminary round for women's 200M Individual medley for the swimming (Serie 1) event took place on 19 July at 9:34 (UTC−04:00), one Honduran athlete participated in this event finishing 4th from 6 participants.

R.	Athlete
3	(Guatemala) Karla Toscano
4	(Honduras) Karen Vilorio
5	(Brazil) Zabrina Holder

The Preliminary round for women's 200M Individual medley for the swimming (Serie 3) event took place on 19 July at 9:38 (UTC−04:00), one Honduran athlete participated in this event finishing 7th from 7 participants.

R.	Athlete
6	(Cayman Islands) Lara Butler
7	(Honduras) Ana Euceda

The Final round for men's 4X200M Freestyle reply for the swimming event took place on 19 July at 19:21 (UTC−04:00), four Honduran athletes participated in this event finishing 4th from 20 participants.

R.	Athlete
3	(Puerto Rico) Raúl Martínez
3	(Puerto Rico) James Moore
3	(Puerto Rico) Eliezer Lizardi
3	(Puerto Rico) Christian Bayo
4	(Honduras) Allan Gutiérrez
4	(Honduras) Javier Hernández
4	(Honduras) Roy Barahona
4	(Honduras) Luis Martorell
D	(Venezuela) Cristian Quintero
D	(Venezuela) Daniele Tirabassi
D	(Venezuela) Roberto Gómez
D	(Venezuela) Crox Acuña

The Preliminary round for men's 100M Butterfly for the swimming event (Serie 3) took place on 20 July at 9:04 (UTC−04:00), one Honduran athlete participated in this event finishing 6th from 7 participants.

R.	Athlete
6	(Honduras) Roy Barahona
7	(United States Virgin Islands) Ryan Nelthropp

The Preliminary round for men's 100M Butterfly for the swimming event (Serie 4) took place on 20 July at 9:06 (UTC−04:00), one Honduran athlete participated in this event finishing 6th from 8 participants.

R.	Athlete
5	(Trinidad and Tobago) Christian Homer
6	(Honduras) Javier Hernández
7	(Jamaica) Ramon Walton

The Preliminary round for women's 100M Breaststrokes for the swimming event took place on 20 July at 9:08 (UTC−04:00), one Honduran athlete participated in this event finishing 6th from 7 participants.

R.	Athlete
5	(Bermuda) Lisa Blackburn
6	(Honduras) Karen Vilorio
7	(United States Virgin Islands) Lauren Leweis

The Preliminary round for women's 100M Backstroke for the swimming event took place on 21 July at 9:02 (UTC−04:00), one Honduran athlete participated in this event finishing 5th from 7 participants.

R.	Athlete
4	(Puerto Rico) Chloe Portela
5	(Honduras) Karen Vilorio
6	(Jamaica) Kendese Nangle

The Preliminary round for women's 100M Butterfly for the swimming event took place on 21 July at 9:18 (UTC−04:00), two Honduran athletes participated in this event finishing 5th and 6th from 6 participants.

R.	Athlete
4	(The Bahamas) Alana Dillette
5	(Honduras) Laura Paz
6	(Honduras) Ana Euceda

The Preliminary round for men's 4X100M Freestyle relay for the swimming event took place on 21 July at 9:37 (UTC−04:00), four Honduran athletes participated in this event finishing 6th from 24 participants.

R.	Athlete
5	(Jamaica) Ramon Walton
5	(Jamaica) Brian Forte
5	(Jamaica) Brad Hamilton
5	(Jamaica) Dominic Walter
6	(Honduras) Allan Gutiérrez
6	(Honduras) Javier Hernández
6	(Honduras) Roy Barahona
6	(Honduras) Luis Martorell

=== Weightlifting ===
The men's 69 kg for the weightlifting event took place on 19 July, one Honduran athlete participated in this event finishing 11th from 11 participants.

R.	Athlete
10	(Nicaragua) Eddi Peña
11	(Honduras) David Mendoza

The men's 77 kg for the weightlifting event took place on 20 July, one Honduran athlete participated in this event finishing 11th from 11 participants.

R.	Athlete
10	(El Salvador) Eliberto Quijada
11	(Honduras) Antonio Moncada

The men's 85 kg for the weightlifting event took place on 20 July, one Honduran athlete participated in this event finishing 5th from 7 participants.

R.	Athlete
4	(Puerto Rico) Gabriel Mestre
5	(Honduras) Cristopher Pavón
6	(Haiti) Belizer Odeus
