= Colombia at the 2010 Central American and Caribbean Games =

- IOC code: COL

in Mayagüez, Puerto Rico July 17, 2010 – August 1, 2010
- Competitors: 259 (144 men and 115 women) in 23 sports
- Flag bearer: Natalia Sánchez
- Medals Ranked 3rd: Gold 102 Silver 86 Bronze 77 Total 265

Central American and Caribbean Games appearances
- 1938; 1946; 1950; 1954; 1959; 1962; 1966; 1970; 1974; 1978; 1982; 1986; 1990; 1993; 1998; 2002; 2006; 2010; 2014; 2018; 2022

The XXIst Central American and Caribbean Games were held in Mayagüez, Puerto Rico from July 17, 2010 to August 1, 2010.

== Medals ==
=== Bronze ===
- Juan Carlos Cardona — Athletics, Men's Marathon

== See also ==
- Colombia at the 2008 Summer Olympics
