= Miguel Robles (swimmer) =

Mexican swimmer (born 1987)

Personal information
- Full name: Miguel Eduardo Robles Castro
- Nationality: Mexico
- Born: December 7, 1987 (age 38) Monterrey, Nuevo León, Mexico

Sport
- Sport: Swimming
- Strokes: Backstroke
Medal record
Representing Mexico
Central American and Caribbean Games
Silver medal – second place	2010 Mayagüez	400 m medley relay
Bronze medal – third place	2010 Mayagüez	100 m backstroke
Bronze medal – third place	2010 Mayagüez	200 m backstroke

Miguel Robles (born December 7, 1987) is a national-record holding backstroke swimmer from Mexico. He has swum for Mexico at the:

- World Championships: 2007 and 2009
- Pan American Games: 2011
- Central American & Caribbean Games: 2006, 2010

As of the end of 2011, he holds the Mexican Records in the 100 and 200 backstroke for both long course and short course.
