= Puerto Rico at the 2010 Central American and Caribbean Games =

- Host Nation
- IOC code: PUR

in Mayagüez, Puerto Rico July 17, 2010 – August 1, 2010
- Competitors: 649 in 41 sports
- Flag bearer: José Juan Barea
- Medals Ranked 4th: Gold 49 Silver 44 Bronze 75 Total 168

Central American and Caribbean Games appearances
- 1930; 1935; 1938; 1946; 1950; 1954; 1959; 1962; 1966; 1970; 1974; 1978; 1982; 1986; 1990; 1993; 1998; 2002; 2006; 2010; 2014; 2018; 2022

The XXIst Central American and Caribbean Games were held in Mayagüez, Puerto Rico from July 17, 2010 to August 1, 2010.

== Results by event ==
=== Athletics ===
Athlete	Discipline	Award
Alexander Greaux	3000m men's obstacles	gold medal
Beverly Ramos	3000m women's obstacles	gold medal
Beverly Ramos	5000m women's	gold medal
Carol Rodriguez	200m women's	silver medal
Javier Culson	400m hurdles men's	silver medal
Jean Rosario	hammer throw	silver medal
Brandon Estrada	pole vault	silver medal
Andrea Zambrana	pole vault	silver medal
Steven Marrero	men's Decathlon	silver medal
Beverly Ramos	1500m women's	bronze medal
Luis Collazo	10000m men's	bronze medal
Marcos Sanchez	men's decathlon	bronze medal

=== Badminton ===
athlete	discipline	award
Jaylene Forrester/ Keara Gonzalez	women's doubles	silver medal
Jaylene Forrester/ Keara Gonzalez/ Irytsha Gonzalez/ Daneysha Santana	women's team	bronze medal
Irytsha Gonzalez/ Daneysha Santana	women's double	bronze medal

=== Basketball ===
athlete	award
men's team	gold medal
women's team	gold medal

=== Handball ===
athlete	award
women's team	silver medal

=== Bowling ===
athlete	discipline	award
Israel Hernandez/Gabriel Sanchez/Andraunick Simounet	men's triples	gold medal
Andraunick Simounet	men's master	gold medal
M Ayala/ Mariangie Colón	women's double	silver medal
Francisco Colon/ Bruno Diaz/ Israel Hernandez/ Luis Rodriguez/ Gabriel Sanchez/ Andraunick Simounet	men's team	bronze medal
Gabriel Sanchez	men's master	bronze medal

==== Boxing ====
athlete	discipline	award
Angel Acosta	men's 48 kg	gold medal
Jonathan Gonzalez	men's 51 kg	gold medal
Camilo Perez	men's 54 kg	gold medal
Jose Pedraza	men's 60 kg	gold medal
Christian Peguero	men's 69 kg	gold medal
Enrique Collazo	men's 75 kg	gold medal
Gerardo Bisbal	men's 91+ kg	gold medal

==== Rafting ====
athlete	discipline	award
Krishna Angueira	200m	bronze medal
Edgar Padro/ Krishna Angueira	200m	bronze medal

==== Diving ====
athlete	discipline	award
Luisa Jimenez	women's 1m trampoline	bronze medal

==== Road Cycling ====
athlete	discipline	award
Marie A. Rosado	women's road	silver medal

==== Equestrian ====
athlete	discipline	award
Mark Watring/ Francis Tress/ Maria Perez/ Israel Lopez	team jumps	bronze medal

==== Fencing ====
athlete	discipline	award
Jonathan Lugo	men's individual foil	silver medal
Melanie Mercado	women's individual saber	silver medal
Krystal Bas	women's individual foil	bronze medal
Angelo Justiniano/ Jonathan Lugo/ Marcos Peña/ Angel Vazquez	men's team foil	bronze medal
Krystal Bas/ Karla Melendez/ Luisa Parrilla/ Aslyn Zayas	women's team foil	bronze medal
Luis Diaz/ Ketziel Estrada/ Hector Maisonet/ Luis Ramos	men's team sword	bronze medal

==== Artistic Gymnastics ====
athlete	discipline	award
Luis Rivera	men's floor	gold medal
Luis Rivera	men's pommel horse	gold medal
Tommy Ramos	men's still rings	gold medal
Luis Rivera	men's vault	gold medal
Puerto Rico	men's team	gold medal
Luis Rivera	men's individual competition	silver medal
Rafael Morales	men's pommel horse	silver medal
Alexander Rodriguez	men's vault	silver medal
Luis Vargas	parallel bars	silver medal
Luis Vargas	high bar	silver medal
Nicolle Vazquez	women's floor	bronze medal
Luis Vargas	men's individual competition	bronze medal
Alexander Rodriguez	men's floor	bronze medal
Puerto Rico	women's teams	bronze medal

==== Trampoline Gymnastics ====
athlete	discipline	award
Natanael Camara	men's individual	silver medal

==== Judo ====
athlete	discipline	award
Enrique Martinez	men's -55 kg	gold medal
Jessica Garcia	women's -63 kg	gold medal
Maria Perez	women's -70 kg	gold medal
Augusto Miranda	men's -73 kg	gold medal
Carlos Santiago	men's -100 kg	gold medal
Melissa Mojica	women's +78 kg	gold medal
Melissa Mojica	women's open	gold medal
Gadiel Miranda	men's -81 kg	silver medal
Pablo Figueroa	men's +100 kg	silver medal
Puerto Rico	women's team	silver medal
Juan Roman	men's -60 kg	bronze medal
Melvin Melendez	men's -66 kg	bronze medal
Alexis Chiclana	men's -90 kg	bronze medal
Carlos Santiago	men's open	bronze medal
Puerto Rico	men's team	bronze medal

==== karate ====
athlete	discipline	award
Deborah Rodriguez	women's 50 kg	bronze medal
Magalis Medina	women's 61 kg	bronze medal
Jesus Rodriguez	men's -67 kg	bronze medal
Rosa Zavala	women's +68 kg	bronze medal
Nelson Gonzalez	men's +84 kg	bronze medal
Puerto Rico	men's team	bronze medal

==== Weightlifting ====
athlete	discipline	award
Carlos Sauri	men's 77 kg	silver medal
Lely Burgos	women's 48 kg	silver medal
Geralee Vega	women's 58 kg	silver medal
Lely Burgos	women's 48 kg	silver medal
Geralee Vega	women's 58 kg	silver medal
Moises Cartagena	men's 94 kg	bronze medal
Lely Burgos	women's 48 kg	bronze medal
Norma Figueroa	women's 69 kg	bronze medal
Geralee Vega	women's 58 kg	bronze medal
Roberto Rosado	men's 94 kg	bronze medal
Carmen Echevarria	women's 48 kg	bronze medal
Norma Figueroa	women's 69 kg	bronze medal
Patricia Figueroa	women's 75 kg	bronze medal
Carmen Echevarria	women's 48 kg	bronze medal
Norma Figueroa	women's 69 kg	bronze medal
Carlos Sauri	men's 77 kg	bronze medal
Moises Cartagena	men's 94 kg	bronze medal

==== Fight ====
athlete	discipline	award
Pedro Soto	men's freestyle 66 kg	gold medal
Yanira Morales	women's freestyle 67 kg	gold medal
Dayanara Rivera	women's freestyle 72 kg	gold medal
Jaime Espinal	men's freestyle 84 kg	gold medal
Ihosvany Negret	men's freestyle 120 kg	gold medal
Enid Rivera	women's freestyle 51 kg	silver medal
German Diaz	men's Greco-Roman 55 kg	bronze medal
Otoniel Perez	men's Greco-Roman 74 kg	bronze medal
Nesmarie Rodriguez	women's freestyle 48 kg	bronze medal
Manuel Ramirez	men's freestyle 55 kg	bronze medal
Yirehliz Rivera	women's freestyle 55 kg	bronze medal
Franklin Gomez	men's freestyle 60 kg	bronze medal

==== Sincronized Swimming ====
athlete	discipline	award
Puerto Rico women's team	combined	bronze medal

==== Swimming ====
athlete	discipline	award
Vanessa Garcia	50m freestyle	gold medal
Vanessa Garcia	100m freestyle	gold medal
Puerto Rico	4 × 100 m freestyle relay	silver medal
Daniel Velez	men's 50m breastroke	silver medal
Patricia Casillas	women's 50m breastroke	bronze medal
Daniel Velez	men's 100m breastroke	bronze medal
Barbara Caraballo	women's 400m individual medley	bronze medal
Puerto Rico	men's 4 × 200 m freestyle relay	bronze medal

==== Figure Skating ====
athlete	discipline	award
Marie Koesnodihardjo	women's combined figure and freestyle	gold medal
Marie Koesnodihardjo	women's dance	gold medal
Marie Koesnodihardjo	women's freestyle	gold medal
Marie Koesnodihardjo	women's combined dance	silver medal
Marie Koesnodihardjo	women's dance freestyle	silver medal
Marie Koesnodihardjo	women's compulsory figures	bronze medal

==== Water Polo ====
athlete	discipline	award
women's team	women's team	gold medal

==== Racquetball ====
athlete	discipline	award
Anna Maldonado	women's individual	bronze medal
women's team	women's teams	bronze medal

==== Taekwondo ====
athlete	discipline	award
Asuncion Ocasio	women's 67 kg	gold medal
Juan Sanchez	men's 74 kg	gold medal
Zoraida Santiago	women's 46 kg	bronze medal
Myrllam Vargas	women's 49 kg	bronze medal
Sara Ramos	women's 53 kg	bronze medal
Gerardo Torres	men's 58 kg	bronze medal
Carla Cotto	women's 62 kg	bronze medal
Adrian Puello	men's 87 kg	bronze medal

==== Tenis ====
athlete	discipline	award
Monica Puig	women's individual	gold medal
Llompart/Perdomo	men's doubles	bronze medal
Llompart/Puig	mix doubles	bronze medal

==== Table Tenis ====
athlete	discipline	award
Hector Berrios/Ricardo Criado/Daniel Gonzalez/Elvin Rivera	men's team	bronze medal

==== Shot ====
athlete	discipline	award
Alexander Rivera	men 50m rifle lying	gold medal
Vivian Rodriguez	women olympic pit	gold medal
Lucas Bennazar	men double pit	gold medal
Giovanni Gonzalez	men air pistol 10m	silver medal
Ana Latorre	women's olympic pit	silver medal
Puerto Rico	men air pistol 10m team	silver medal
Edil Velazquez, Alexander Rivera, Christian Cartagena	men air rifle 10m team	silver medal
Puerto Rico	men double pit team	silver medal
Nestor Peña	men gun central fire 25m	bronze medal
Puerto Rico	men rapid fire pistol 25m team	bronze medal
Puerto Rico	men gun central fire 25m team	bronze medal

==== Archery ====
athlete	discipline	award
Daniel Castro	men individual compound 70m	gold medal
Daniel Castro	men individual compound FITA	silver medal
Puerto Rico	men compound team	silver medal
Daniel Castro	men individual compound 30m	bronze medal
Puerto Rico	women's compound team	bronze medal

==== Triathlon ====
athlete	discipline	award
Puerto Rico	women's olympic distance teams	bronze medal

==== Sailing ====
athlete	discipline	award
Raul Rios/ Gabriel Ramos	snipe	gold medal
Enrique Figueroa/ Victor Aponte	hobie cat 16	gold medal
Efrain Lugo/ Melvin Gonzalez/ Alejandro Berrios/ Yin Luna/ Pablo Mendez	J-24	gold medal
Enrique Figueroa/ Natalia Olivero	hobie cat 16	silver medal
Jorge Santiago/ Manuel Aviles/ Michael Seralles/ Sebastian Luna/ Luis Llorens	J-24	silver medal
Marcos Teixodor/ Ricardo Latimer	snipe	bronze medal

==== Volleyball ====
athlete	discipline	award
Puerto Rico	men's team	gold medal
Puerto Rico	women's team	silver medal

==== Beach Volleyball ====
athlete	discipline	award
Puerto Rico	women's team	silver medal
Puerto Rico	men's team	bronze medal

== See also ==
- Puerto Rico at the 2010 Summer Youth Olympics
