= U.S. Virgin Islands at the 2010 Central American and Caribbean Games =

Virgin Islands at the 2010 Central American and Caribbean Games
- Flag of the United States Virgin Islands
- IOC code: ISV

in Mayagüez, Puerto Rico July 17, 2010 – August 1, 2010
- Competitors: 88 (63 men and 25 women) in 10 sports
- Medals Ranked 21st: Gold 0 Silver 2 Bronze 0 Total 2

Central American and Caribbean Games appearances
- 1982; 1986; 1990; 1993; 1998; 2002; 2006; 2010; 2014; 2018; 2022

The Virgin Islands sent 88 athletes (63 males, 25 females) to the XXIst Central American and Caribbean Games in Mayagüez, Puerto Rico, July 17 - August 1, 2010.

The athletes participated in athletics (9), baseball (20), basketball (22), bowling (4), boxing (3), sailing (10), shooting (4), swimming (7), tennis (5), and triathlon (1).

== Medalists ==
=== Silver ===
- Tabarie Henry – Athletics (400m)
- Muhammad Halim – Athletics (Long Jump)

== Results by event ==
=== Swimming ===
- Kevin Hensley (m)
- Lauren Kelly Lewis (f)
- Bryson Eduard Mays (m)
- Ryan Andrew Nelthropp (m)
- Brigitte Marie Rasmussen (f)
- Caylee Victoria Watson (f)
- Branden Whitehurst (m)
