= Nicholas Bovell =

Trinidad and Tobago swimmer (born 1986)

Nick Bovell
Personal information
- Full name: Nicholas Bovell
- Nickname: Nick
- Nationality: Trinidad and Tobago
- Born: 11 May 1986 (age 40)
- Height: 6 ft 0 in (1.83 m)
- Weight: 76 kg (168 lb)

Sport
- Sport: Swimming
Medal record
Central American and Caribbean Games
Bronze medal – third place	2006 Catagena	50m Backstroke
Bronze medal – third place	2006 Catagena	100 Backstroke

Nicholas Edward Anthony ("Nick") Bovell (born 11 May 1986) is an Olympic swimmer from Trinidad and Tobago. He is the younger brother of fellow Trinidad swimming Olympic George Bovell.

Bovell represented his native country at the:

- 2008 Olympics,
- 2003 World Championships,
- 2003 Pan American Games.

He was also to swim at the 2004 Olympics; however, he was injured at the time of the Games and was unable to compete.
