= Swimming at the 2007 Pan American Games =

The swimming competitions at the 2007 Pan American Games consisted of 34 events, held on and at:

- pool: July 16–22, Maria Lenk Aquatic Park
- open water (10K races): July 14, Copacabana Beach

Thiago Pereira won eight medals (six gold, one silver and one bronze) and became the winner of the most medals in a single edition of the Games, equaling the Costa Rican swimmer Silvia Poll—who won eight medals at 1987 in Indianapolis. Pereira also surpassed the five gold mark that belonged to Mark Spitz in the 1967 Pan Am Games in Winnipeg

In this edition, three countries have won, for the first time, a medal in swimming at the Pan American Games: Cayman Islands, Bahamas and Barbados.

== Pool schedule ==
date	Morning session Finals & semifinals (10:00 a.m.)	Evening session Preliminary heats (7:00 p.m.)
Monday; July 16, 2007		women's 50 free men's 100 free women's 400 IM men's 400 IM women's 100 fly men's 100 fly women's 400 free men's 100 breast
Tuesday; July 17, 2007	women's 50 free (semifinals) men's 100 free (semifinals) women's 400 IM (final) men's 400 IM (final) women's 100 fly (semifinals) men's 100 fly (semifinals) women's 400 free (final) men's 100 breast (semifinals) men's 800 free relay (final)	women's 100 back men's 400 free women's 100 breast men's 200 back
Wednesday; July 18, 2007	women's 50 free (final) men's 100 free (final) women's 100 fly (final) men's 100 fly (final) men's 100 breast (final) women's 100 back (semifinals) men's 400 free (final) women's 100 breast (semifinals) women's 800 free relay (final)	men's 200 back women's 200 free men's 200 free women's 200 I.M. men's 200 I.M.
Thursday; July 19, 2007	women's 100 back (final) women's 100 breast (finals) men's 200 back (finals) women's 200 free (semifinals) men's 200 free (semifinals) women's 200 IM (semifinals) men's 200 I.M. (semifinals) women's 400 free relay (final)	men's 200 fly women's 200 fly men's 200 breast women's 800 free (final)
Friday; July 20, 2007	women's 200 free (final) men's 200 free (final) women's 200 I.M. (final) men's 200 I.M. (final) men's 200 fly (semifinals) women's 200 fly (semifinals) men's 200 breast (semifinals) men's 400 free relay (final)	women's 100 free women's 200 breast men's 50 free women's 200 back men's 100 back men's 1500 free (final)
Saturday; July 21, 2007	men's 200 fly (final) women's 200 fly (finals) men's 200 breast (final) women's 100 free (semifinals) women's 200 breast (semifinals) men's 50 free (semifinals) women's 200 back (semifinals) men's 100 back (semifinals)	
Sunday; July 22, 2007	women's 100 free (final) women's 200 breast (final) men's 50 free (final) women's 200 back (final) men's 100 back (finals) women's 400 medley relay (final) men's 400 medley relay (final)	

== Results ==
=== Men's events ===
Event	Gold		Silver		Bronze	
50 m freestyle	César Cielo; Brazil	21.84 CR, SA	Nicholas Santos; Brazil	22.18	George Bovell; Trinidad and Tobago	22.36
100 m freestyle	César Cielo; Brazil	48.79 CR	José Meolans; Argentina	49.42	Gabe Woodward; United States	49.59
200 m freestyle	Matthew Owen; United States	1:48.78	Shaune Fraser; Cayman Islands	1:48.95	Adam Sioui; Canada	1:48.97
400 m freestyle	Matt Patton; United States	3:49.77 CR	Tobias Work; United States	3:50.62	Armando Negreiros; Brazil	3:51.18
1500 m freestyle	Chip Peterson; United States	15:12.33 CR	Ricardo Monasterio; Venezuela	15:23.28	Kier Maitland; Canada	15:25.28
100 m backstroke	Randall Bal; United States	53.66 CR	Peter Marshall; United States	54.64	Thiago Pereira; Brazil	54.75 SA
200 m backstroke	Thiago Pereira; Brazil	1:58.42 CR, SA	Tyler Clary; United States	1:59.24	Lucas Salatta; Brazil	1:59.51
100 m breaststroke	Scott Dickens; Canada	1:01.20 CR	Mark Gangloff; United States	1:01.24	Mathieu Bois; Canada	1:01.83
200 m breaststroke	Thiago Pereira; Brazil	2:13.51	Henrique Barbosa; Brazil	2:13.83	Scott Spann; United States	2:13.98
100 m butterfly	Kaio de Almeida; Brazil	52.05 CR	Gabriel Mangabeira; Brazil	52.43	Albert Subirats; Venezuela	52.78
200 m butterfly	Kaio de Almeida; Brazil	1:55.45 CR, SA	Eddie Erazo; United States	1:57.07	Juan Veloz; Mexico	1:58.43
200 m I.M.	Thiago Pereira; Brazil	1:57.79 CR, SA	Robert Margalis; United States	2:00.69	Bradley Ally; Barbados	2:00.96
400 m I.M.	Thiago Pereira; Brazil	4:11.14 CR, SA	Robert Margalis; United States	4:17.52	Keith Beavers; Canada	4:19.01
4 × 100 m freestyle relay	Brazil; Fernando Silva, Eduardo Deboni, Nicolas Oliveira, César Cielo; Thiago Pereira*; Nicholas Santos*	3:15.90 CR, SA	United States; Gabe Woodward, Ricky Berens, Dale Rogers, Andy Grant; Gary Hall, Jr.* Alex Righi*	3:16.66	Venezuela; Albert Subirats, Octavio Alesi, Luis Rojas, Crox Acuña; Jesus Casanova*; Reymer Vezga*	3:18.97
4 × 200 m freestyle relay	Brazil; Thiago Pereira, Rodrigo Castro, Lucas Salatta, Nicolas Oliveira	7:12.27 CR, SA	United States; Ricky Berens, Matthew Owen, Andy Grant, Robert Margalis	7:15.00	Canada; Chad Hankewich, Stefan Hirniak, Pascal Wollach, Adam Sioui	7:17.73
4 × 100 m medley relay	United States; Randall Bal, Mark Gangloff, Ricky Berens, Andy Grant; Peter Marshall*; Christian Schurr*; Pat O'Neil*; Alex Righi*	3:34.37 CR	Brazil; Thiago Pereira, Henrique Barbosa, Kaio de Almeida, César Cielo; Lucas Salatta*; Felipe Lima*; Gabriel Mangabeira*; Eduardo Deboni*	3:35.81 SA	Canada; Matthew Hawes, Scott Dickens, Joe Bartoch, Adam Sioui; Mathieu Bois*; Chad Hankewich*	3:38.16
10K	Fran Crippen; United States	2:02:24.1	Chip Peterson; United States	2:02:29.2	Allan do Carmo; Brazil	2:03:53.7

* Swimmers who participated in the heats only and received medals.

=== Women's events ===
Event	Gold		Silver		Bronze	
50 m freestyle	Arlene Semeco; Venezuela	25.22	Vanessa García; Puerto Rico	25.46	Flávia Delaroli; Brazil	25.52
100 m freestyle	Arlene Semeco; Venezuela	55.78	Flávia Delaroli; Brazil	55.84	Vanessa García; Puerto Rico	56.61
200 m freestyle	Ava Ohlgren; United States	2:00.03	Stephanie Horner; Canada	2:00.29	Monique Ferreira; Brazil	2:01.38
400 m freestyle	Jessica Rodriquez; United States	4:12.22	Patricia Castañeda; Mexico	4:13.34	Corinne Showalter; United States	4:13.72
800 m freestyle	Caroline Burckle; United States	8:35.10	Patricia Castañeda; Mexico	8:38.92	Savannah King; Canada	8:39.36
100 m backstroke	Julia Smit; United States	1:02.01	Fabíola Molina; Brazil	1:02.18 SA	Elizabeth Wycliffe; Canada	1:02.46
200 m backstroke	Teresa Crippen; United States	2:10.57 CR	Julia Smit; United States	2:11.18	Elizabeth Wycliffe; Canada	2:13.29
100 m breaststroke	Michelle McKeehan; United States	1:08.49	Annamay Pierse; Canada	1:08.72	Elizabeth Tinnon; United States	1:09.18
200 m breaststroke	Caitlin Leverenz; United States	2:25.62 CR	Annamay Pierse; Canada	2:26.79	Keri Hehn; United States	2:28.20
100 m butterfly	Kathleen Hersey; United States	59.21 CR	Samantha Woodward; United States	59.98	Gabriella Silva; Brazil	1:00.50
200 m butterfly	Kathleen Hersey; United States	2:07.64 CR	Courtney Kalisz; United States	2:12.75	Daiene Dias; Brazil	2:13.35
200 m I.M.	Julia Smit; United States	2:13.07 CR	Emily Kukors; United States	2:13.88	Stephanie Horner; Canada	2:15.42
400 m I.M.	Kathleen Hersey; United States	4:44.08	Teresa Crippen; United States	4:46.18	Georgina Bardach; Argentina	4:47.46
4 × 100 m freestyle relay	United States (Julia Smit, Samantha Woodward, Emily Kukors, Maritza Correia); Lauren Thies*; Michele King*	3:41.97	Canada (Elizabeth Collins, Seanna Mitchell, Chanelle Charron-Watson, Hilary Bell)	3:46.23	Venezuela (Arlene Semeco, Erin Volcán, Ximena Mari Vilar Arriojas, Yanel Pinto); Jeserik Pinto*; Jennifer Marquez*	3:52.87
4 × 200 m freestyle relay	United States (Jessica Rodriguez, Emily Kukors, Ava Ohlgren, Katie Carroll); Lauren Thies*; Teresa Crippen*	8:02.03 CR	Canada (Chanelle Charron-Watson, Elizabeth Collins, Hilary Bell, Stephanie Horner); Savannah King*; Zsofia Balazs*	8:04.56	Brazil (Tatiana Barbosa, Monique Ferreira, Manuella Lyrio, Paula Baracho); Joanna Maranhão*	8:13.15
4 × 100 m medley relay	United States (Julia Smit, Michelle McKeehan, Kathleen Hersey, Maritza Correia); Brielle White*	4:04.60 CR	Canada (Elizabeth Wycliffe, Annamay Pierse, Stephanie Horner, Chanelle Charron-Watson); Caitilin Meredith*; Jillian Tyler*; Elizabeth Collins*	4:07.85	Bahamas (Alana Dillette, Alicia Lightbourne, Arianna Vanderpool-Wallace, Nikia Deveaux)	4:18.97
10K	Chloe Sutton; United States	2:13:47.6	Poliana Okimoto; Brazil	2:13:48.4	Tanya Hunks; Canada	2:13:50.5

* Swimmers who participated in the heats only and received medals.

== Medal table ==
Rank	Nation	Gold	Silver	Bronze	Total
1	United States	21	15	5	41
2	Brazil	10	7	9	26
3	Venezuela	2	1	3	6
4	Canada	1	6	11	18
5	Mexico	0	2	1	3
6	Argentina	0	1	1	2
6	Puerto Rico	0	1	1	2
8	Cayman Islands	0	1	0	1
9	Bahamas	0	0	1	1
9	Barbados	0	0	1	1
9	Trinidad and Tobago	0	0	1	1
Totals (11 entries)		34	34	34	102
