= Swimming at the 2007 Pan American Games – Men's 4 × 100 metre medley relay =

The Men's 4x100m Medley Relay event at the 2007 Pan American Games took place at the Maria Lenk Aquatic Park in Rio de Janeiro, Brazil, with the final being swum on July 22.

== Medalists ==
Gold	Randall Bal; Mark Gangloff; Ricky Berens; Andy Grant; United States
Silver	Thiago Pereira; Henrique Barbosa; Kaio Almeida; César Cielo; Brazil
Bronze	Matthew Hawes; Scott Dickens; Joe Bartoch; Adam Sioui; Canada

== Results ==
=== Finals ===
Place	Country	Swimmers	Time	Note
1	United States	Randall Bal (53.83); Mark Gangloff (59.54); Ricky Berens (52.25); Andy Grant (48.75)	3:34.37	CR
2	Brazil	Thiago Pereira (55.44); Henrique Barbosa (1:00.51); Kaio Almeida (52.06); César Cielo (47.80)	3:35.81	
3	Canada	Matthew Hawes (54.81); Scott Dickens (1:01.41); Joe Bartoch (52.22); Adam Sioui (49.72)	3:38.16	
4	Argentina	Joaquín Belza (58.06); Sergio Ferreyra (1:02.83); Mariano Caviglia (56.01); José Meolans (48.53)	3:45.43	
5	Venezuela	Albert Subirats (57.10); Leopoldo Andara (1:06.75); Octavio Alesi (52.74); Luis Rojas (51.24)	3:47.83	
6	Mexico	Enrique Bayata (59.18); Alfredo Jacobo (1:03.69); Juan Veloz (54.71); Juan Alberto Yeh (52.00)	3:49.58	
7	(United States Virgin Islands) Virgin Islands	Kieran Locke (59.44); Josh Laban (1:06.90); Morgan Locke (58.39); Ryan Nelthropp (54.86)	3:59.59	
8	Honduras	Horacio Carcamo (1:04.53); Roy Barahona (1:08.95); Javier Hernández (58.22); Juan Lagos (56.07)	4:07.77	

=== Preliminaries ===
The heats was held on July 20.

Place	Country	Swimmers	Time	Note
1	Canada	Matthew Hawes (55.10); Mathieu Bois (1:03.42); Joe Bartoch (53.13); Chad Hankewich (50.34)	3:41.99	Q
2	United States	Peter Marshall (56.75); Christian Schurr (1:02.60); Pat O'Neil (52.83); Alex Righi (49.96)	3:42.14	Q
3	Brazil	Lucas Salatta (57.35); Felipe Lima (1:03.24); Gabriel Mangabeira (55.79); Eduardo Deboni (51.34)	3:47.72	Q
4	Argentina	Joaquin Belza (58.41); Christian Soldano (1:04.73); Mariano Caviglia (56.11); Matias Aguilera (52.28)	3:51.53	Q
5	Mexico	Enrique Bayata (1:00.12); Alfredo Jacobo (1:04.42); Juan Alberto Yeh (56.50); Amauri Rodríguez (51.96)	3:53.00	Q
6	Venezuela	Reymer Vezga (59.39); Rohan Pinto (1:06.98); Octavio Alesi (54.37); Jesus Casanova (52.60)	3:53.34	Q
7	Virgin Islands	Kieran Locke (1:01.61); Kevin Hensley (1:07.48); Morgan Locke (58.72); Josh Laban (52.43)	4:00.24	Q
8	Honduras	Horacio Carcamo (1:04.49); Roy Barahona (1:10.46); Javier Hernández (58.96); Juan Lagos (56.35)	4:10.26	Q
9	Barbados	Nicholas Neckles (59.22); Andrei Cross (1:06.33); Bradley Ally (59.40); Shawn Clarke -	DSQ	
