= Swimming at the 2007 Pan American Games – Women's 4 × 100 metre medley relay =

The Women's 4 × 100 m Medley Relay at the 2007 Pan American Games took place at the Maria Lenk Aquatic Park in Rio de Janeiro, Brazil, with the final being swum on July 22.

== Medalists ==
Gold	Julia Smit; Michelle McKeehan; Kathleen Hersey; Maritza Correia; United States
Silver	Liz Wycliffe; Annamay Pierse; Stephanie Horner; Chanelle Charron-Watson; Canada
Bronze	Alana Dillette; Alicia Lightbourne; Arianna Vanderpool-Wallace; Nikia Deveaux; Bahamas

== Results ==
=== Finals ===
Place	Country	Swimmers	Time	Note
1	United States	Julia Smit (1:01.94); Michelle McKeehan (1:08.59); Kathleen Hersey (58.57); Maritza Correia (55.50)	4:04.60	CR
2	Canada	Liz Wycliffe (1:02.35); Annamay Pierse (1:08.35); Stephanie Horner (1:00.99); Chanelle Charron-Watson (56.16)	4:07.85	
3	Bahamas	Alana Dillette (1:04.16); Alicia Lightbourne (1:12.86); Arianna Vanderpool-Wallace (1:03.69); Nikia Deveaux (58.26)	4:18.97	
4	Venezuela	Erin Volcán (1:05.98); Daniela Victoria (1:13.67); María Rodríguez (1:04.48); Arlene Semeco (57.01)	4:21.14	
5	Peru	Slavica Pavic (1:10.62); Valeria Silva (1:16.50); María Torres (1:12.00); Massie Carrillo (1:01.87)	4:40.99	
6	Honduras	Laura Páz (1:13.13); Karen Poujol (1:21.75); Sharon Fajardo (1:06.59); Laura Leiva (1:04.91)	4:46.38	
--	Mexico	Fernanda González (1:05.04); Adriana Marmolejo (1:13.19); Alma Arciniega (1:04.32); Liliana Ibáñez	DQ	
--	Brazil	Fabíola Molina (1:01.98); Tatiane Sakemi (1:12.26); Daiene Dias (1:00.18); Rebeca Gusmão (54.85)	~~4:09.27~~	Result nullified See Rebeca Gusmão entry for explanation

=== Preliminaries ===
The heats was held on July 20.

Place	Country	Swimmers	Time	Note
1	Canada	Caitilin Meredith (1:03.63); Jillian Tyler (1:10.74); Stephanie Horner (1:01.86); Elizabeth Collins (55.99)	4:12.22	Q
2	United States	Brielle White (1:02.60); Michelle McKeehan (1:11.10); Kathleen Hersey (1:00.58); Maritza Correia (58.34)	4:12.62	Q
3	Bahamas	Alana Dillette (1:05.67); Alicia Lightbourne (1:15.33); Arianna Vanderpool-Wallace (1:04.09); Nikia Deveaux (58.61)	4:23.70	Q
4	Brazil	Fernanda Alvarenga (1:08.18); Mariana Katsuno (1:13.99); Gabriella Silva (1:01.22); Flávia Delaroli (1:01.85)	4:25.24	Q
5	Venezuela	Jeserick Pinto (1:08.78); Gloria González (1:16.13); Andreina Pinto (1:06.72); Ximena Vilar (1:01.06)	4:32.69	Q
6	Mexico	Fernanda González (1:05.22); Adriana Marmolejo (1:25.58); Alma Arciniega (1:05.53); Sandra Alanis (1:00.54)	4:36.87	Q
7	Peru	Slavica Pavic (1:11.21); Valeria Silva (1:17.92); María Torres (1:10.49); Massie Carrillo (1:03.24)	4:42.86	Q
8	Honduras	Laura Páz (1:14.89); Karen Poujol (1:23.58); Sharon Fajardo (1:08.05); Laura Leiva (1:05.22)	4:51.74	Q
9	Argentina	– – – –	DNS	
