= Swimming at the 2007 Pan American Games – Men's 100 metre breaststroke =

The Men's 100m Breaststroke event at the 2007 Pan American Games occurred at the Maria Lenk Aquatic Park in Rio de Janeiro, Brazil on 16—18 July.

Three first round heats were raced, comprising a total of 20 swimmers. The fastest 16 swimmers from this group qualified to move on to the semifinals stage. The 16 swimmers who advanced then raced in two semifinals of eight swimmers each, the results being pooled and the fastest eight swimmers advancing to the final.

Scott Dickens won the gold medal, breaking a string of 9 U.S. titles in a row. Before him, only other non-American had won the race, the Brazilian José Fiolo, in the first edition of the Games which this race was held, in 1967.

== Medalists ==
Gold	Scott Dickens; Canada
Silver	Mark Gangloff; United States
Bronze	Mathieu Bois; Canada

== Records ==
Record	Athlete	Time	Date	Venue
World Record	Brendan Hansen (USA)	59.13	2006-08-01	(United States) Irvine
Pan Am Record	Mark Gangloff (USA)	1:00.95	2003-08-11	(Dominican Republic) Santo Domingo

== Results ==
Rank	Swimmer	Heats		Semifinals		Final
Rank	Swimmer	Time	Rank	Time	Rank	Time
1	Scott Dickens (CAN)	1:01.94	1	1:01.65	3	1:01.20
2	Mark Gangloff (USA)	1:02.05	1	1:00.24	1	1:01.24
3	Mathieu Bois (CAN)	1:02.34	3	1:02.20	4	1:01.83
4	Henrique Barbosa (BRA)	1:02.53	4	1:01.47	2	1:01.93
5	Felipe Lima (BRA)	1:03.84	9	1:03.02	6	1:02.65
6	Christian Schurr (USA)	1:03.18	6	1:03.00	5	1:03.12
7	Alfredo Jacobo (MEX)	1:02.99	5	1:03.02	6	1:03.74
8	Daniel Velez (PUR)	1:04.53	11	1:03.76	8	1:04.12
9	Pedro Leão (BRA)	1:03.81	8	1:04.08		
10	Sergio Ferreyra (ARG)	1:03.32	7	1:04.57		
11	Andrei Cross (BAR)	1:04.14	10	1:04.73		
12	Bradley Ally (BAR)	1:04.56	12	1:04.82		
13	Édgar Crespo (PAN)	1:04.95	13	1:05.14		
14	Leopoldo Andara (VEN)	1:06.02	14	1:05.57		
15	Rohan Pinto (VEN)	1:06.93	16	1:07.59		
16	Genaro Prono (PAR)	1:06.29	15	1:07.99		
17	Bastian de Nordenflycht (CHI)	1:07.31				
18	Kevin Hensley (ISV)	1:07.47				
19	Brad Hamilton (JAM)	1:10.57				
—	Francisco Picasso (URU)	DNS				
