= Swimming at the 2007 Pan American Games – Men's 200 metre breaststroke =

The Men's 200m Breaststroke event at the 2007 Pan American Games took place at the Maria Lenk Aquatic Park in Rio de Janeiro, Brazil, with the final being swum on July 21.

== Medalists ==
Gold	Thiago Pereira; Brazil
Silver	Henrique Barbosa; Brazil
Bronze	Scott Spann; United States

== Results ==
=== Finals ===
Place	Swimmer	Country	Time	Note
1	Thiago Pereira	Brazil	2:13.51	
2	Henrique Barbosa	Brazil	2:13.83	
3	Scott Spann	United States	2:13.98	
4	Scott Dickens	Canada	2:14.72	
5	Mathieu Bois	Canada	2:15.14	
6	Daniel Velez	Puerto Rico	2:20.49	
7	Sergio Ferreyra	Argentina	2:21.58	
8	Chris Ash	United States	DQ	

=== Preliminaries ===
Place	Swimmer	Country	Time	Note
1	Scott Spann	United States	2:17.17	Q
2	Henrique Barbosa	Brazil	2:17.44	Q
3	Mathieu Bois	Canada	2:17.54	Q
4	Scott Dickens	Canada	2:17.59	Q
5	Thiago Pereira	Brazil	2:17.64	Q
6	Chris Ash	United States	2:17.67	Q
7	Daniel Velez	Puerto Rico	2:20.02	Q
8	Sergio Ferreyra	Argentina	2:20.76	Q
9	Leopoldo Andara	Venezuela	2:21.24	
10	Cristian Soldano	Argentina	2:22.43	
11	Édgar Crespo	Panama	2:25.19	
12	Alfredo Jacobo	Mexico	2:26.09	
13	Kevin Hensley	(United States Virgin Islands) Virgin Islands	2:26.44	
14	Bastian De Nordenflycht	Chile	2:27.37	
15	Rohan Ian Pinto	Venezuela	2:30.82	
16	Genaro Prono	Paraguay	2:31.71	
