= Swimming at the 2007 Pan American Games – Women's 100 metre backstroke =

The Women's 100m Backstroke event at the 2007 Pan American Games occurred at the Maria Lenk Aquatic Park in Rio de Janeiro, Brazil, with the final being swum on July 19.

== Medalists ==
Gold	Julia Smit; United States
Silver	Fabíola Molina; Brazil
Bronze	Liz Wycliffe; Canada

== Results ==
=== Finals ===
Place	Swimmer	Country	Time	Note
1	Julia Smit	United States	1:02.01	
2	Fabíola Molina	Brazil	1:02.18	
3	Liz Wycliffe	Canada	1:02.46	
4	Brielle White	United States	1:02.49	
5	Carolina Colorado	Colombia	1:03.01	
6	Caitlin Meredith	Canada	1:04.09	
7	Fernanda González	Mexico	1:04.33	
8	Alana Dillette	Bahamas	1:05.19	

=== Semifinals ===
Rank	Swimmer	Country	Time	Note
1	Fabíola Molina	Brazil	1:02.26	Q
2	Liz Wycliffe	Canada	1:02.49	Q
3	Julia Smit	United States	1:02.67	Q
4	Brielle White	United States	1:03.10	Q
5	Carolina Colorado	Colombia	1:03.33	Q
6	Caitlin Meredith	Canada	1:04.00	Q
7	Fernanda González	Mexico	1:04.29	Q
8	Alana Dillette	Bahamas	1:04.39	Q
9	Erin Volcán	Venezuela	1:04.55	
10	Kiera Aitken	Bermuda	1:05.93	
11	Lourdes Villaseñor	Mexico	1:06.47	
12	Fernanda Alvarenga	Brazil	1:06.60	
13	Massie Carrillo	Peru	1:07.14	
14	Jeserick Pinto	Venezuela	1:07.32	
15	Pavic Slavica	Peru	1:08.53	
16	Donna Marie Wickham	Trinidad and Tobago	1:09.12	
