= 2010 Pan Pacific Swimming Championships – Men's 50 metre breaststroke =

Men's 50 metre breaststroke at the 2010 Pan Pacific Swimming Championships
- Venue: William Woollett Jr. Aquatics Center
- Dates: August 20, 2010 (heats & finals)
- Competitors: 23 from 10 nations
- Winning time: 27.26

Medalists
gold medal	Felipe França	Brazil
silver medal	Mark Gangloff	United States
bronze medal	Scott Dickens	Canada

The men's 50 metre breaststroke competition at the 2010 Pan Pacific Swimming Championships took place on August 20 at the William Woollett Jr. Aquatics Center. It was the first appearance of this event in the Pan Pacific Swimming Championships.

== Records ==
Prior to this competition, the existing world record was as follows:

World record	Cameron van der Burgh (RSA)	26.67	Rome, Italy	July 29, 2009

== Results ==
All times are in minutes and seconds.

KEY:	q	Fastest non-qualifiers	Q	Qualified	CR	Championships record	NR	National record	PB	Personal best	SB	Seasonal best

=== Heats ===
The first round was held on August 20, at 11:51.

Rank	Heat	Lane	Name	Nationality	Time	Notes
1	3	4	Felipe França	Brazil	27.34	QA, CR
2	3	5	Kosuke Kitajima	Japan	27.64	QA
3	2	3	Ryo Tateishi	Japan	27.74	QA
4	1	2	Mark Gangloff	United States	27.75	QA
5	2	4	Brenton Rickard	Australia	27.77	QA
6	3	2	Michael Alexandrov	United States	27.78	QA
7	1	7	Scott Spann	United States	27.82	QA
8	1	4	João Luiz Gomes Júnior	Brazil	27.83	QA
9	2	2	Scott Dickens	Canada	27.89	QB
10	1	5	Christian Sprenger	Australia	27.90	QB
11	2	6	Glenn Snyders	New Zealand	27.93	QB
12	2	5	Felipe Lima	Brazil	27.97	QB
13	1	3	Henrique Barbosa	Brazil	28.01	QB
14	3	7	Naoya Tomita	Japan	28.05	QB
15	3	6	Yuta Suenaga	Japan	28.07	QB
16	1	6	Warren Barnes	Canada	28.23	QB
17	2	7	Wong Chun Yan	Hong Kong	28.79	
18	1	1	Neil Versfeld	South Africa	28.85	
19	2	8	Timothy Ferris	Zimbabwe	28.93	
19	3	1	Choi Kyu-Woong	South Korea	28.97	
21	2	1	Paul Kornfeld	Canada	29.00	
22	3	8	Tsui Hoi Tung	Hong Kong	30.35	
23	3	3	Eduardo Fischer	Brazil	DSQ	

=== B Final ===
The B final was held on August 20, at 19:53.

Rank	Lane	Name	Nationality	Time	Notes
9	3	Glenn Snyders	New Zealand	27.83	
10	6	Felipe Lima	Brazil	27.94	
11	5	Christian Sprenger	Australia	27.98	
12	4	Scott Spann	United States	28.09	
13	7	Warren Barnes	Canada	28.33	
14	2	Naoya Tomita	Japan	28.50	
15	8	Neil Versfeld	South Africa	28.82	
16	1	Wong Chun Yan	Hong Kong	29.03	

=== A Final ===
The A final was held on August 20, at 19:53.

Rank	Lane	Name	Nationality	Time	Notes
1st place, gold medalist(s)	4	Felipe França	Brazil	27.26	CR
2nd place, silver medalist(s)	6	Mark Gangloff	United States	27.52	
3rd place, bronze medalist(s)	8	Scott Dickens	Canada	27.63	
4	2	Brenton Rickard	Australia	27.65	
5	3	Ryo Tateishi	Japan	27.67	
5	5	Kosuke Kitajima	Japan	27.67	
7	1	João Luiz Gomes Júnior	Brazil	27.69	
8	7	Michael Alexandrov	United States	27.70	
