= Swimming at the 2007 Pan American Games – Women's 200 metre individual medley =

The Women's 200m Individual Medley (IM) event at the 2007 Pan American Games took place at the Maria Lenk Aquatic Park in Rio de Janeiro, Brazil, with the semifinals being stage on July 19 and the final a day later.

== Medalists ==
Gold	Julia Smit; United States
Silver	Emily Kukors; United States
Bronze	Stephanie Horner; Canada

== Results ==
Rank	Swimmer	Semifinals		Final
Rank	Swimmer	Time	Rank	Time
1	Julia Smit (USA)	2:21.31	5	2:13.07
2	Emily Kukors (USA)	2:16.65	1	2:13.88
3	Stephanie Horner (CAN)	2:17.92	2	2:15.42
4	Joanna Maranhão (BRA)	2:20.72	3	2:16.99
5	Georgina Bardach (ARG)	2:21.17	4	2:23.05
6	Lilian Cerroni (BRA)	2:22.27	7	2:23.73
7	McKayla Lightbourn (BAH)	2:26.30	6	2:24.92
8	Maria Coy (GUA)	2:28.66	8	2:29.45
9	Antonella Scanavino (URU)	2:29.63		
10	Carla Fernández (CHI)	2:31.40		
11	Kimba Collymore (TRI)	2:32.87		
12	Katerine Moreno (BOL)	2:34.07		
13	Maria Alejandra Torres (PER)	2:39.22		
