= Swimming at the 2007 Pan American Games – Women's 200 metre freestyle =

The Women's 200m freestyle at the 2007 Pan American Games occurred at the Maria Lenk Aquatic Park in Rio de Janeiro, Brazil, with the final being swum on July 20.

== Medalists ==
Gold	Ava Ohlgren; United States
Silver	Stephanie Horner; Canada
Bronze	Monique Ferreira; Brazil

== Results ==
=== Finals ===
Place	Swimmer	Country	Time	Note
1	Ava Ohlgren	United States	2:00.03	
2	Stephanie Horner	Canada	2:00.29	
3	Monique Ferreira	Brazil	2:01.38	
4	Hiley Bell	Canada	2:02.35	
5	Katie Carroll	United States	2:02.74	
6	Pamela Benitez	El Salvador	2:03.80	
7	Cecilia Biagioli	Argentina	2:04.10	
8	Erin Volcán	Venezuela	2:05.01	
