= Swimming at the 2007 Pan American Games – Women's 200 metre backstroke =

The Women's 200m Backstroke event at the 2007 Pan American Games occurred at the Maria Lenk Aquatic Park in Rio de Janeiro, Brazil, with the final being swum on July 22.

== Medalists ==
Gold	Teresa Crippen; United States
Silver	Julia Smit; United States
Bronze	Liz Wycliffe; Canada

== Results ==
=== Finals ===
Place	Swimmer	Country	Time	Note
1	Teresa Crippen	United States	2:10.57	GR
2	Julia Smit	United States	2:11.18	
3	Liz Wycliffe	Canada	2:13.29	
4	Karah Stanworth-Belleville	Canada	2:17.11	
5	Fernanda González	Mexico	2:17.33	
6	Erin Volcán	Venezuela	2:17.46	
7	Lourdes Villaseñor	Mexico	2:20.29	
8	Paula Baracho	Brazil	2:21.05	
