= Swimming at the 2007 Pan American Games – Women's 100 metre breaststroke =

The Women's 100m Breaststroke event at the 2007 Pan American Games took place at the Maria Lenk Aquatic Park in Rio de Janeiro, Brazil, with the final being swum on July 19.

== Medalists ==
Gold	Michelle McKeehan; United States
Silver	Annamay Pierse; Canada
Bronze	Elizabeth Tinnon; United States

== Results ==
Rank	Swimmer	Heats		Semifinals		Final
Rank	Swimmer	Time	Rank	Time	Rank	Time
1	Michelle McKeehan (USA)	1:10.35	3	1:10.34	3	1:08.49
2	Annamay Pierse (CAN)	1:07.78	1	1:08.27	1	1:08.72
3	Elizabeth Tinnon (USA)	1:08.94	2	1:09.99	2	1:09.18
4	Jillian Tyler (CAN)	1:10.42	4	1:11.14	4	1:10.29
5	Javiera Salcedo (ARG)	1:11.79	5	1:11.57	5	1:12.26
6	Tatiane Sakemi (BRA)	1:11.97	6	1:11.74	6	1:12.35
7	Adriana Marmolejo (MEX)	1:12.57	9	1:13.50	8	1:12.60
8	Alia Atkinson (JAM)	1:12.25	7	1:13.01	7	1:14.34
9	Agustina de Giovanni (ARG)	1:12.30	8	1:13.64	9	
10	Daniela Victoria (VEN)	1:13.35	11	1:13.81	10	
11	Mariana Katsuno (BRA)	1:13.23	10	1:14.15	11	
12	Gloria González (VEN)	1:14.34	12	1:14.93	12	
13	Valeria Silva (PER)	1:15.09	14	1:15.23	13	
14	Kimba Collymore (TRI)	1:15.97	16	1:15.65	14	
15	Danielle Beaubrun (LCA)	1:15.52	15	1:16.44	15	
—	Alicia Lightbourne (BAH)	1:14.36	13	DSQ	—	
17	McKayla Lightbourn (BAH)	1:15.77	17			
18	Nora Miro (PER)	1:16.58	18			
19	Nilshaira Isenia (AHO)	1:18.09	19			
20	Natasha Moodie (JAM)	1:18.56	20			
21	Katerine Moreno (BOL)	1:19.28	21			
22	Chinyere Pigot (SUR)	1:20.85	22			
23	Karen Poujol (HON)	1:22.13	23			
