= Swimming at the 2011 Pan American Games – Women's 200 metre backstroke =

Women's 200 metre backstroke at the 2011 Pan American Games
- Venue: Scotiabank Aquatics Center
- Dates: October 20 (preliminaries and finals)
- Competitors: 18 from 13 nations

Medalists
| Gold medal | Elizabeth Pelton | United States |
| Silver medal | Bonnie Brandon | United States |
| Bronze medal | Fernanda González | Mexico |

The women's 200 metre backstroke competition of the swimming events at the 2011 Pan American Games took place on October 20 at the Scotiabank Aquatics Center in the municipality of Zapopan, near Guadalajara, Mexico. The defending Pan American Games champion was Teresa Crippen of the United States.

This race consisted of four lengths of the pool all in backstroke.

== Records ==
Prior to this competition, the existing world and Pan American Games records were as follows:

| World record | Kirsty Coventry (ZIM) | 2:04.81 | Rome, Italy | August 1, 2009 |
| Pan American Games record | Teresa Crippen (USA) | 2:10.57 | Rio de Janeiro, Brazil | July 22, 2007 |

== Qualification ==
Each National Olympic Committee (NOC) was able to enter up to two entrants providing they had met the A standard (2:22.8) in the qualifying period (January 1, 2010 to September 4, 2011). NOCs were also permitted to enter one athlete providing they had met the B standard (2:27.1) in the same qualifying period.

== Results ==
All times are in minutes and seconds.

| KEY: | q | Fastest non-qualifiers | Q | Qualified | GR | Games record | NR | National record | PB | Personal best | SB | Seasonal best |

=== Heats ===
The first round was held on October 20.

| Rank | Heat | Lane | Name | Nationality | Time | Notes |
|---|---|---|---|---|---|---|
| 1 | 3 | 4 | Elizabeth Pelton | United States | 2:10.66 | QA |
| 2 | 2 | 4 | Bonnie Brandon | United States | 2:13.87 | QA |
| 3 | 1 | 4 | Fernanda González | Mexico | 2:16.61 | QA |
| 4 | 1 | 5 | Lourdes Villaseñor | Mexico | 2:16.94 | QA |
| 5 | 2 | 5 | Gabrielle Soucisse | Canada | 2:17.27 | QA |
| 6 | 3 | 5 | Gisela Morales | Guatemala | 2:17.86 | QA |
| 7 | 2 | 6 | Elimar Barrios | Venezuela | 2:20.96 | QA |
| 8 | 3 | 3 | Fernanda Alvarenga | Brazil | 2:21.24 | QA |
| 9 | 3 | 2 | Mckayla Lightbourn | Bahamas | 2:23.74 | QB |
| 10 | 1 | 3 | Karyn Jewell | Canada | 2:23.78 | QB |
| 11 | 1 | 6 | Alana Berrocal | Puerto Rico | 2:24.76 | QB |
| 12 | 3 | 6 | Florencia Perotti | Argentina | 2:24.78 | QB |
| 13 | 2 | 2 | Erika Torellas | Venezuela | 2:26.16 | QB |
| 14 | 2 | 7 | Karen Vilorio | Honduras | 2:26.58 | QB |
| 15 | 3 | 7 | Laura Rodriguez | Dominican Republic | 2:27.26 | QB |
| 16 | 1 | 2 | Ines Remersaro | Uruguay | 2:27.77 | QB |
| 17 | 1 | 7 | Mariana Zavalla | Bolivia | 2:28.30 | |
| | 2 | 3 | Joanna Maranhão | Brazil | | DNS |

=== B Final ===
The B final was also held on October 20.

| Rank | Lane | Name | Nationality | Time | Notes |
|---|---|---|---|---|---|
| 9 | 4 | Mckayla Lightbourn | Bahamas | 2:19.25 | |
| 10 | 5 | Karyn Jewell | Canada | 2:20.87 | |
| 11 | 6 | Florencia Perotti | Argentina | 2:23.03 | |
| 12 | 8 | Ines Remersaro | Uruguay | 2:24.16 | |
| 13 | 3 | Alana Berrocal | Puerto Rico | 2:24.18 | |
| 14 | 2 | Erika Torellas | Venezuela | 2:25.17 | |
| 15 | 7 | Karen Vilorio | Honduras | 2:25.99 | |
| 16 | 1 | Laura Rodriguez | Dominican Republic | 2:28.13 | |

=== A Final ===
The A final was also held on October 20.

| Rank | Lane | Name | Nationality | Time | Notes |
|---|---|---|---|---|---|
| 1st place, gold medalist(s) | 4 | Elizabeth Pelton | United States | 2:08.99 | GR |
| 2nd place, silver medalist(s) | 5 | Bonnie Brandon | United States | 2:12.57 | |
| 3rd place, bronze medalist(s) | 3 | Fernanda González | Mexico | 2:13.56 | |
| 4 | 7 | Gisela Morales | Guatemala | 2:16.33 | |
| 5 | 6 | Lourdes Villaseñor | Mexico | 2:16.60 | |
| 6 | 2 | Gabrielle Soucisse | Canada | 2:16.86 | |
| 7 | 1 | Elimar Barrios | Venezuela | 2:21.40 | |
| 8 | 8 | Fernanda Alvarenga | Brazil | 2:22.77 | |
