= Swimming at the 2007 Pan American Games – Women's 400 metre individual medley =

The Women's 400m Individual Medley (IM) event at the 2007 Pan American Games took place at the Maria Lenk Aquatic Park in Rio de Janeiro, Brazil, with the final being swum on July 17.

== Medalists ==
| Gold | Kathleen Hersey; United States |
| Silver | Teresa Crippen; United States |
| Bronze | Georgina Bardach; Argentina |

== Records ==
| Record | Athlete | Time | Date | Venue |
|---|---|---|---|---|
| World Record | Katie Hoff (USA) | 4:32.89 | 2007-04-01 | (Australia) Melbourne |
| Pan Am Record | Joanne Malar (CAN) | 4:38.46 | 1999-08-02 | (Canada) Winnipeg |

== Results ==
| Rank | Swimmer | Prelims | | Final |
| Rank | Swimmer | Time | Rank | Time |
|---|---|---|---|---|
| 1 | Kathleen Hersey (USA) | 4:47.44 | 3 | 4:44.08 |
| 2 | Teresa Crippen (USA) | 4:45.19 | 1 | 4:46.18 |
| 3 | Georgina Bardach (ARG) | 4:49.95 | 5 | 4:47.45 |
| 4 | Joanna Maranhão (BRA) | 4:46.04 | 2 | 4:47.54 |
| 5 | Stephanie Horner (CAN) | 4:47.92 | 4 | 4:48.32 |
| 6 | Monika Stitski (CAN) | 4:50.06 | 6 | 4:48.77 |
| 7 | Susana Escobar (MEX) | 4:52.87 | 7 | 4:52.30 |
| 8 | Larissa Cieslak (BRA) | 5:04.27 | 8 | 5:03.67 |
| 9 | Prisciliana Escobar (MEX) | 5:06.65 | | |
| 10 | McKayla Lightbourn (BAH) | 5:10.12 | | |
| 11 | Maria Fernanda Coy (GUA) | 5:12.56 | | |
| 12 | Carla Fernández (CHI) | 5:19.18 | | |
| 13 | Laura Lucía Paz (HON) | 5:29.04 | | |
