= Swimming at the 2011 Pan American Games – Women's 400 metre individual medley =

Women's 400 metre individual medley at the 2011 Pan American Games
- Venue: Scotiabank Aquatics Center
- Dates: October 15 (preliminaries and finals)
- Competitors: 25 from 16 nations
- Winning score: 4:46.15

Medalists
Gold medal	Julia Smit	United States
Silver medal	Joanna Maranhão	Brazil
Bronze medal	Allysa Vavra	United States

The women's 400 metre individual medley competition of the swimming events at the 2011 Pan American Games took place on the 15 of October at the Scotiabank Aquatics Center. The defending Pan American Games champion is Kathleen Hersey of the United States.

This race consisted of eight lengths of the pool. The first two lengths were swum using the butterfly stroke, the second pair with the backstroke, the third pair of lengths in breaststroke, and the final two were freestyle.

== Records ==
Prior to this competition, the existing world and Pan American Games records were as follows:

World record	Stephanie Rice (AUS)	4:29.45	Beijing, China	August 10, 2008
Pan American Games record	Joanne Malar (CAN)	4:38.46	Winnipeg, Canada	August 2, 1999

== Qualification ==
Each National Olympic Committee (NOC) was able to enter up to two entrants providing they had met the A standard (5:19.0) in the qualifying period (January 1, 2010 to September 4, 2011). NOCs were also permitted to enter one athlete providing they had met the B standard (5:28.6) in the same qualifying period.

== Results ==
All times shown are in minutes.

KEY:	q	Fastest non-qualifiers	Q	Qualified	NR	National record	PB	Personal best	SB	Seasonal best

=== Heats ===
The first round was held on October 15.

Rank	Heat	Lane	Name	Nationality	Time	Notes
1	4	4	Julia Smit	United States	4:51.78	QA
2	3	4	Allysa Vavra	United States	4:53.76	QA
3	2	4	Joanna Maranhão	Brazil	4:54.51	QA
4	3	5	Georgina Bardach	Argentina	4:57.58	QA
5	4	5	Karyn Jewell	Canada	4:57.81	QA
6	4	3	Susana Escobar	Mexico	4:58.57	QA
7	2	5	Hanna Pierse	Canada	4:59.76	QA
8	3	3	Samantha Arevalo	Ecuador	5:02.29	QA
9	3	6	Julia Arino	Argentina	5:06.78	QB
10	3	2	Eliana Barrios	Venezuela	5:07.70	QB
11	2	3	Montserrat Ortuño	Mexico	5:08.47	QB
12	4	6	Larissa Cieslak	Brazil	5:09.86	QB
13	4	7	Patricia Quevedo	Peru	5:13.30	QB
14	4	2	Barbara Caraballo	Puerto Rico	5:17.07	QB
15	2	2	Zara Bailey	Jamaica	5:19.46	QB
16	2	1	Lani Cabrera	Barbados	5:19.66	QB
17	1	5	Daniela Reyes	Chile	5:20.05	
18	1	3	Laura Rodriguez	Dominican Republic	5:22.28	
19	4	8	Daniella van den Berg	Aruba	5:24.75	
20	3	7	Ana Castellanos	Honduras	5:26.80	
21	2	7	Maria Alejandra Torres	Peru	5:27.30	
22	4	1	Karen Vilorio	Honduras	5:30.42	
23	3	1	Lara Maria Butler	Cayman Islands	5:35.96	
24	1	4	Amara Gibbs	Barbados	5:38.27	
	2	6	Daniela Victoria	Venezuela	DNS	

=== B Final ===
The B final was also held on October 15.

Rank	Lane	Name	Nationality	Time	Notes
9	4	Julia Arino	Argentina	5:01.20	
10	3	Montserrat Ortuño	Mexico	5:04.07	
11	5	Eliana Barrios	Venezuela	5:04.10	
12	6	Larissa Cieslak	Brazil	5:12.83	
13	7	Barbara Caraballo	Puerto Rico	5:17.61	
14	1	Zara Bailey	Jamaica	5:17.72	
15	2	Patricia Quevedo	Peru	5:20.50	
16	8	Lani Cabrera	Barbados	5:22.06	

=== A Final ===
The A final was held on October 15.

Rank	Lane	Name	Nationality	Time	Notes
1st place, gold medalist(s)	4	Julia Smit	United States	4:46.15	
2nd place, silver medalist(s)	3	Joanna Maranhão	Brazil	4:46.33	
3rd place, bronze medalist(s)	5	Allysa Vavra	United States	4:48.05	
4	1	Hanna Pierse	Canada	4:52.95	
5	6	Georgina Bardach	Argentina	4:53.81	
6	7	Susana Escobar	Mexico	4:54.49	
7	2	Karyn Jewell	Canada	4:57.65	
8	8	Samantha Arevalo	Ecuador	4:58.27	
