= Swimming at the 2006 Central American and Caribbean Games – Women's 50 metre freestyle =

The Women's 50m Freestyle event at the 2006 Central American and Caribbean Games occurred on Thursday, July 20, 2006, at the S.U. Pedro de Heredia Aquatic Complex in Cartagena, Colombia.

== Records ==
World Record	Inge de Bruijn (NED)	24.13	2000-09-22	Sydney, Australia
CAC Record	Eileen Coparropa (PAN)	25.68	2002-11-29	(El Salvador) San Salvador

== Results ==
=== Final ===
Place	Swimmer	Country	Time	Note
1	Vanessa García	Puerto Rico	25.29	GR, NR
2	Arlene Semeco	Venezuela	25.46	
3	Sharntelle McLean	Trinidad and Tobago	26.37	
4	Alia Atkinson	Jamaica	26.71	
5	Ximena Vilár	Venezuela	26.82	
6	Liliana Ibáñez	Mexico	26.85	
7	Nikia Deveaux	Bahamas	27.00	
8	Carolina Moreno	Mexico	27.15	

=== Preliminaries ===
Rank	Swimmer	Country	Time	Note
1	Arlene Semeco	Venezuela	25.78	Q
2	Vanessa García	Puerto Rico	26.12	Q
3	Ximena Vilár	Venezuela	27.04	Q
4	Nikia Deveaux	Bahamas	27.07	Q
5	Carolina Moreno	Mexico	27.09	Q
6	Sharntelle McLean	Trinidad and Tobago	27.16	Q
7	Alia Atkinson	Jamaica	27.21	Q
8	Liliana Ibáñez	Mexico	27.31	Q
9	Gisela Morales	Guatemala	27.43	
10	Ariel Weech	Bahamas	27.47	
11	Heysi Villarreal	Cuba	27.57	
12	Sharon Fajardo	Honduras	27.72	
13	Alexis Jordan	Barbados	27.88	
14	Erika Stewart	Colombia	28.55	
15	Jennifer Powell	Cayman Islands	28.64	
16	Nishani Cicilson	Suriname	28.79	
17	María Álvarez	Colombia	28.83	
18	Dalia Tórrez	Nicaragua	28.89	
19	Natalie Ferdinand	Barbados	29.33	
