= Badminton at the 2007 Pan American Games =

- Competitors: 73 from 14 nations

Badminton at the 2007 Pan American Games was played at the Riocentro Sports Complex, Pavilion 4B, in Rio de Janeiro, Brazil. The competition was held between July 14 and July 19.

== Participating nations ==
A total of 14 nations entered players at badminton competition, with 40 men and 33 women.

- Argentina (2)
- Barbados (3)
- Brazil (8)
- Canada (8)
- Chile (2)
- Cuba (6)
- Ecuador (2)
- Guatemala (8)
- Jamaica (2)
- Mexico (8)
- Peru (8)
- Suriname (2)
- Trinidad and Tobago (6)
- United States (8)

== Medal summary ==
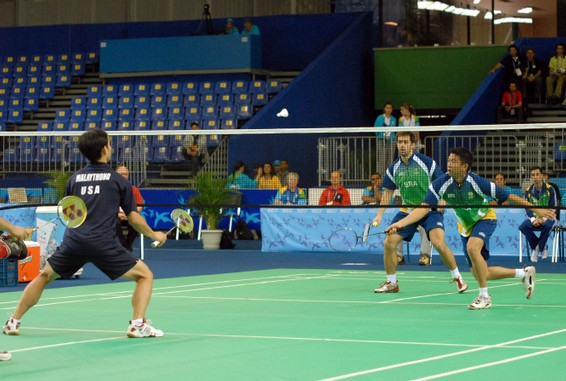
Doubles match between United States and Brazil.

Event:	Gold:	Silver:	Bronze:
Men
Men's singles	Mike Beres; Canada	Kevin Cordón; Guatemala	Eric Go; United States
Men's singles	Mike Beres; Canada	Kevin Cordón; Guatemala	Rodrigo Pacheco; Peru
Men's doubles	Mike Beres and William Milroy; Canada	Howard Bach and Bob Malaythong; United States	Guilherme Kumasaka and Guilherme Pardo; Brazil
Men's doubles	Mike Beres and William Milroy; Canada	Howard Bach and Bob Malaythong; United States	Erick Anguiano and Pedro Yang; Guatemala
Women
Women's singles	Eva Lee; United States	Charmaine Reid; Canada	Sarah MacMaster; Canada
Women's singles	Eva Lee; United States	Charmaine Reid; Canada	Claudia Rivero; Peru
Women's doubles	Eva Lee and Mesinee Mangkalakiri; United States	Fiona McKee and Charmaine Reid; Canada	Kuei Ya Chen and Jamie Subandhi; United States
Women's doubles	Eva Lee and Mesinee Mangkalakiri; United States	Fiona McKee and Charmaine Reid; Canada	Jie Meng Jin and Valeria Rivero; Peru
Mixed
Mixed doubles	Howard Bach and Eva Lee; United States	Mike Beres and Val Loker; Canada	Bob Malaythong and Mesinee Mangkalakiri; United States
Mixed doubles	Howard Bach and Eva Lee; United States	Mike Beres and Val Loker; Canada	Rodrigo Pacheco and Claudia Rivero; Peru

== Medal table ==
Place	Nation	Gold medal	Silver medal	Bronze medal	Total
1	United States	3	1	3	7
2	Canada	2	3	1	6
3	Guatemala	0	1	1	2
4	Peru	0	0	4	4
5	Brazil	0	0	1	1
Total		5	5	10	20
