= Arianna Vanderpool-Wallace =

Bahamian swimmer (born 1990)

Personal information
- Full name: Arianna Fritzallen Vanderpool-Wallace
- National team: Bahamas
- Born: March 4, 1990 (age 36)
- Height: 5 ft 6 in (1.68 m)
- Weight: 61 kg (134 lb)

Sport
- Sport: Swimming
- Strokes: Freestyle
- College team: Auburn University
Medal record
Women's swimming
Representing the Bahamas
World Championships (SC)
| Bronze medal – third place | 2010 Dubai | 50 m freestyle |
Pan American Games
| Gold medal – first place | 2015 Toronto | 50 m freestyle |
| Bronze medal – third place | 2007 Rio | 4x100 m medley |
| Bronze medal – third place | 2015 Toronto | 100 m freestyle |
Commonwealth Games
| Silver medal – second place | 2014 Glasgow | 50m butterfly |
Central American and Caribbean Games
| Gold medal – first place | 2010 Mayagüez | 50 m butterfly |
| Gold medal – first place | 2010 Mayagüez | 100 m butterfly |
| Gold medal – first place | 2014 Veracruz | 50 m freestyle |
| Gold medal – first place | 2014 Veracruz | 100 m freestyle |
| Gold medal – first place | 2014 Veracruz | 50 m butterfly |
| Gold medal – first place | 2014 Veracruz | 100 m butterfly |
| Silver medal – second place | 2010 Mayagüez | 50 m freestyle |
| Silver medal – second place | 2010 Mayagüez | 100 m freestyle |
| Bronze medal – third place | 2006 Cartagena | 4x100 m freestyle |
| Bronze medal – third place | 2010 Mayagüez | 4x200 m freestyle |
| Bronze medal – third place | 2010 Mayagüez | 4x100 m medley |

Arianna Vanderpool-Wallace (born March 4, 1990) is a competitive swimmer and national record-holder from the Bahamas who has represented her country in international championships, including the Olympics, FINA world championships, and Pan American Games. She swam for the Bahamas at the 2008 Olympics and was the first Bahamian ever to make the final of their event. She attended Auburn University in the United States, where she swam for the Auburn Tigers swimming and diving team in collegiate competition. At the 2007 Pan American Games she was part of the bronze medal winning women's 4 × 100 m medley relay alongside Alicia Lightbourne, Nikia Deveaux and Alana Dillette. She is a graduate of swimming powerhouse The Bolles School. She retired from competitive swimming in 2018.

She is the daughter of Bahamian politician Vincent Vanderpool-Wallace.

== International tournaments ==
- Olympics: 2008, 2012 and 2016
- World Championships: 2009
- Pan American Games: 2007
- Central American & Caribbean Games: 2006 and 2010
- Commonwealth Games: 2014

=== Central American & Caribbean Games ===
Vanderpool-Wallace won four gold medals at the 2010 games, in Women's 50 and 100m Freestyle and 50 and 100m Butterfly. She also set games records of 54.87 for the 100m Freestyle and 26.46 for the 50m Butterfly.

=== Commonwealth Games 2014 ===
Vanderpool-Wallace was the flag bearer for her nation at the opening ceremony. She competed in three events: Women's 50m Freestyle, Women's 50m Butterfly and Women's 100m Freestyle. She won a silver medal in the 50m Butterfly with a time of 25.53, finished 4th in the 50m Freestyle with a time of 24.34 - a personal best - and fifth in the 100m Freestyle with 54.37.

== Best times ==
- 50m Freestyle: 24:31
- 100m Freestyle: 53:73

== See also ==
- List of Commonwealth Games medallists in swimming (women)
