= Jennifer Song (synchronized swimmer) =

South Korean-Canadian synchronized swimmer

Personal information
- Born: January 3, 1983 (age 43) Seoul, South Korea

Sport
- Sport: Swimming
- Strokes: synchronized swimming
Medal record
Representing Canada
Synchronized swimming
Pan American Games
Silver medal – second place	2007 Rio de Janeiro	Team

Jennifer Song (born 2 January 1983) is a South Korean-born Canadian synchronized swimmer who competed in the 2008 Summer Olympics.
