= Christian Schurr =

Mexican swimmer (born 1984)

Personal information
- Full name: Christian Alexander Schurr Voigt
- Nationality: Mexico
- Born: August 20, 1984 (age 42) Washington, D.C., U.S.
- Height: 1.80 m (5 ft 11 in)
- Weight: 74.84 kg (165 lb)

Sport
- Sport: Swimming
- Strokes: Breaststroke
Medal record
Men's swimming
Representing United States
Pan American Games
Gold medal – first place	2007 Rio	4×100 m medley

Christian Alexander Schurr Voigt (Note: In this Spanish name, the first or paternal surname is Schurr and the second or maternal family name is Voigt.) (born August 20, 1984) is a Mexican swimmer. At the 2012 Summer Olympics, he competed in the Men's 200 metre breaststroke, finishing in 26th place overall in the heats, failing to qualify for the semifinals.

Born in Washington, D.C., United States, he swam for the U.S. at the 2007 Pan American Games in Rio de Janeiro, where he won a gold medal in the Men's 4x100 metre medley relay by participating in heats. He also finished 6th in the Men's 100 metre breaststroke.
