= Michelle McKeehan =

American swimmer (born 1989)

Personal information
- National team: United States
- Born: November 9, 1989 (age 36) Beech Grove, Indiana, U.S.
- Height: 5 ft 6 in (168 cm)

Sport
- Sport: Swimming
- Strokes: Breaststroke, medley
- College team: University of Georgia
Medal record
Women's swimming
Representing the United States
Pan American Games
Gold medal – first place	2007 Rio	100 m breast
Gold medal – first place	2007 Rio	4x100 m medley
Bronze medal – third place	2011 Guadalajara	200 m breast

Michelle McKeehan (born November 9, 1989) is an American competition swimmer. She is a three-time medalist at the Pan American Games.

McKeehan was born in Beech Grove, Indiana in 1989, the daughter of Stu McKeehan and Amy Chase. She is a 2008 graduate of Center Grove High School in Greenwood, Indiana. She swam collegiately for the University of Georgia, where she majored in public relations and speech communications. At the 2007 Pan American Games in Rio de Janeiro, where she won gold medals in the 100-meter breaststroke and 4x100-meter medley relay. Four years later at the 2011 Pan American Games in Guadalajara, McKeehan won a bronze medal in the 200-meter breaststroke.
