= Elizabeth Tinnon =

American breaststroke swimmer (born 1985)

Personal information
- Nationality: United States
- Born: May 21, 1985 (age 41) Bowling Green, Kentucky, U.S.
- Height: 6 ft 0 in (183 cm)

Sport
- Sport: Swimming
- Strokes: Breaststroke
- Club: Lakeside Swim Team
- College team: University of Texas
Medal record
Women's swimming
Representing the United States
Pan American Games
Bronze medal – third place	2007 Rio	100 m breaststroke

Elizabeth Tinnon (born May 21, 1985) is an American breaststroke swimmer. She is a bronze medalist from the Pan American Games.

== Personal ==
Tinnon was born in Bowling Green, Kentucky in 1985, the daughter of Mack and Susan Tinnon. Tinnon is a 2003 graduate of Bowling Green High School. Tinnon attended the University of Texas and graduated in 2007, majoring in corporate communication.

== Swimming career ==
As a nineteen-year-old, Tinnon competed at the 2004 U.S. Olympic Team Trials, finishing twelfth in the 100-meter breaststroke and fourteenth in the 200-meter breaststroke.

At the 2007 Pan American Games in Rio de Janeiro, she won a bronze medal in the 100-meter breaststroke. At the 2008 U.S. Olympic Team Trials, Tinnon finished eight in the 100-meter breaststroke and sixteenth in the 200-meter breaststroke. At the 2009 National Championships, Tinnon placed fifth in the 200-meter breaststroke and eleventh in the 100-meter breaststroke.
