= Mark Gangloff =

American swimmer (born 1982)

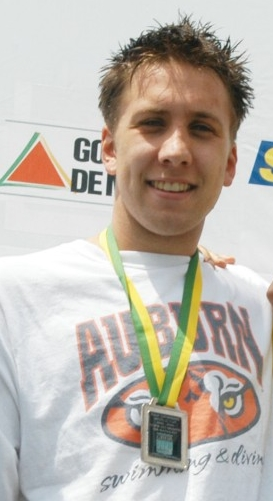
- Gangloff as Auburn swimmer in 2006

Personal information
- Full name: Mark Daniel Gangloff
- National team: United States
- Born: June 8, 1982 (age 44) Buffalo, New York, U.S.
- Height: 6 ft 0 in (183 cm)
- Weight: 185 lb (84 kg)
- Spouse: Ashley Rubenstein (m. 2007)

Sport
- Sport: Swimming
- Events: 100 breast, IM medley relay
- Strokes: Breaststroke
- Club: SwimMAC Carolina
- College team: Auburn University (2005)
- Coach: Tim Lewarchick (Firestone); David Marsh (Auburn)
Medal record
Men's swimming
Representing the United States
Olympic Games
Gold medal – first place	2004 Athens	4×100 m medley
Gold medal – first place	2008 Beijing	4×100 m medley
World Championships (LC)
Gold medal – first place	2005 Montreal	4×100 m medley
Gold medal – first place	2009 Rome	4×100 m medley
Gold medal – first place	2011 Shanghai	4×100 m medley
Silver medal – second place	2005 Montreal	50 m breaststroke
Bronze medal – third place	2009 Rome	50 m breaststroke
World Championships (SC)
Gold medal – first place	2004 Indianapolis	4×100 m medley
Gold medal – first place	2010 Dubai	4×100 m medley
Silver medal – second place	2008 Manchester	50 m breaststroke
Silver medal – second place	2008 Manchester	4×100 m medley
Pan Pacific Championships
Gold medal – first place	2010 Irvine	4×100 m medley
Silver medal – second place	2010 Irvine	50 m breaststroke
Bronze medal – third place	2010 Irvine	100 m breaststroke
Pan American Games
Gold medal – first place	2003 Santo Domingo	100 m breaststroke
Gold medal – first place	2003 Santo Domingo	4×100 m medley
Gold medal – first place	2007 Rio	4×100 m medley
Silver medal – second place	2007 Rio	100 m breaststroke
Bronze medal – third place	1999 Winnipeg	200 m breaststroke

Mark Daniel Gangloff (born June 8, 1982) is an American former competition swimmer for Auburn University, and was an Olympic gold medalist as a breaststroker in the 4x100 medley relay in both the 2004 Athens and 2008 Beijing Olympics. He is a former world and American record holder, and has coached swimming as an Assistant at Auburn, in age group competition for SwimMAC Carolina, and in the collegiate ranks for the University of Missouri Tigers and the University of North Carolina Tarheels.

== Early life and swimming ==
Gangloff was born in Buffalo, New York, on June 8, 1982, to parents Ken and Jennifer Gangloff. He attended Akron's Harvey Firestone High School where he swam for Head Coach Tim Lewarchick and Assistant Coach Cindy Dial, graduating in 2000. As a Senior at Firestone, he set an Ohio State meet record time of 1:47.63, while winning the 200-yard individual medley. During his High School career, he was a multi-year All American and won four individual Division I Ohio State Championships, while competing in fourteen events. As a High School Senior in 2000, he swam a state meet record time of 55.10 in the 100-yard breaststroke, and had formerly taken state titles in the 100 breaststroke in both his Sophomore and Junior years.

== Auburn University ==
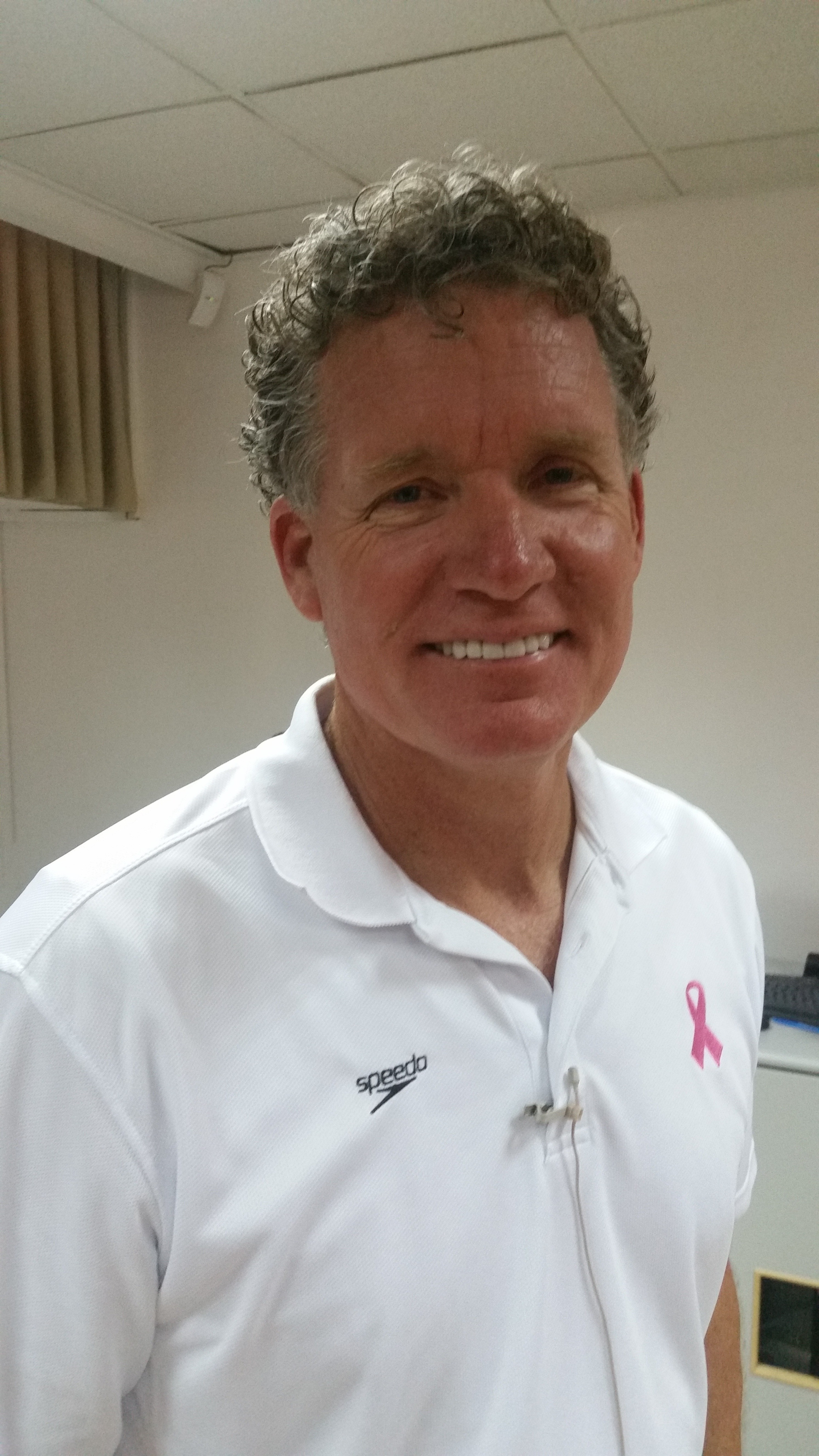
Auburn Coach Dave Marsh

He accepted an athletic scholarship to attend Auburn University, where he swam for the Auburn Tigers swimming and diving team in NCAA competition under Head Coach David Marsh from 2001 to 2005, serving as a Captain in his senior year.

At Auburn, Gangloff helped the team capture NCAA championships in two seasons from 2003-2004, and take Southeastern Conference titles all four years of his swimming eligibility. He won twelve honors as an All American, and gained individual SEC titles in the 100 and 200 breaststroke and in the medley relays for both the 200 and 400 distance. By his Senior year, he was considered American's third fastest swimmer in the breaststroke. Gangloff graduated from Auburn in 2005 with a bachelor's degree in criminology.

== 2004 Athens Olympics ==
Gangloff represented the United States at two consecutive Summer Olympics winning a gold medal in each. At the 2004 Summer Olympics in Athens, he earned a gold medal by swimming for the winning U.S. team in the preliminary heats of the 4×100-meter medley relay, an event in which the American team had long been dominant. Gangloff swam breaststroke in the second position in the second preliminary heat, which placed first with the team of Lenny Krazelberg, Michael Phelps, and Neil Walker as anchor. The preliminary team swam a 3:35.10, allowing the American team to advance to the finals, where the U.S. team, without Gangloff, later swam a combined time of 3:30.68.

In individual competition, he placed fourth in his signature event, the men's 100-meter breaststroke with a time of 1:01.17, placing him only .29 seconds from medal contention. The Gold, Silver and Bronze medals were won respectively by a Japanese, American and French swimmer. He finished behind the third place French swimmer Hugues Duboscq, who swam a time of 1:00.88 just edging out Gangloff for the bronze.

=== International competition highlights ===
In international competition, Gangloff swam in three Pan-American Games, taking 400 medley relay golds in 2003 and 2007. He had a first place medal in 2003 in the 100 breaststroke, and in 1999 captured a third place medal in the 200 breaststroke. Between 2005-2011, he was a gold medalist three times at the Long Course World Championships in the 4x100 medley relay in 2005 in Montreal, in 2009 in Rome, and in 2011 in Shanghai. In the Short Course World Championships, he was a gold medalist in the 4x100 medley relay in 2004 in Indianapolis and 2010 in Dubai.

Gangloff swam professionally in 2007, for Mechlinberg Aquatic Center in Charlotte, North Carolina, and swam as a U.S. team member during his career.

== 2008 Beijing Olympics ==
At the 2008 Summer Olympics in Beijing, he again participated in his signature event, the 100-meter breaststroke, and placed eighth in the event final with a time of 1:00.24 with the Japanese, Norwegian, and French teams taking the gold silver and bronze medals.

He took the gold medal in the 4×100-meter medley relay swimming breaststroke in Heat 2 of the preliminaries, where his team swam a combined time of 3:32.75, allowing the American team to advance to the finals. In the finals, swimming without Gangloff, the American medley relay team took the gold with a time of 3:29.34, with Australia taking the silver, and Japan taking the bronze.

Beginning in the 2009-10 timeframe and likely beyond, Gangloff swam for SwimMAC Aquatics Carolina, and Auburn Aquatics S.E.

=== World, American records ===
Gangloff broke the American record in the 100-meter breaststroke with a time of 59.01 at the U.S. Swimming National Championships in 2009. He set a world record of 3:20.71 in the 4×100 meter medley relay on December 18, 2009 that held through December 20 of that year.

He continued to train for the 2012 Olympics after the birth of his first child, working out 2.5-4.5 hours a day in Auburn, though he retired from elite training in that year and took up collegiate coaching.

== Coaching ==
In his first coaching role, he served voluntarily as an Assistant coach at Auburn, where he had competed. While at Auburn, he learned to teach stroke technique, assist with swimmers' racing strategies and strength training.

Gangloff coached from 2007-9 at Charlotte's Swim MAC Carolina in Charlotte, N.C. At Swim MAC, he helped develop the swim program, and design training, and worked with racing strategy for age group swimmers from 10-18. Gangloff was still competing during this period.

After retiring from elite competitive training, he coached at the University of Missouri from 2012-2019, where he served as head coach from 2017-2019. At the University of Missouri, Gangloff led both the men's and women's teams to place within the top 15 at the NCAA championships.

Gangloff was hired as a head swimming coach at the University of North Carolina in May, 2019. By the 2023-4 season, he had led the North Carolina Women's swimming team to four seasons with NCAA national finishes among the top 20 teams in America. Eight of his North Carolina swimmers attended the 2024 Paris Olympic trials and four participated in the 2024 Paris Olympics. North Carolina women placed tenth at the NCAA Championships in the 2023-4 season.

=== Honors ===
In 2000, he was part of the Akron Beacon Boy's All-Beacon Journal team in swimming and diving, and the Male Swimmer of the Year. In 2023, he was elected to the Akron Public Schools Athletics Hall of Fame.

Gangloff and wife Ashley, who dove as a champion for Auburn, have daughters, Annabelle, Katie Rose, and Kathryn. He married the former Ashley Rubenstein in Auburn on May 26, 2007. Ashley graduated Auburn with a degree in Studio Art, and completed a Master's degree in Business Administration from the University in 2007. Before his marriage, he appeared in the 2006 Ashton Kutcher movie The Guardian in a minor role as a student at a Coast Guard Rescue school.

== See also ==
- List of Auburn University people
- List of Olympic medalists in swimming (men)
- List of World Aquatics Championships medalists in swimming (men)
- World record progression 4 × 100 metres medley relay
