= Felipe Lima (swimmer) =

Brazilian swimmer (born 1985)

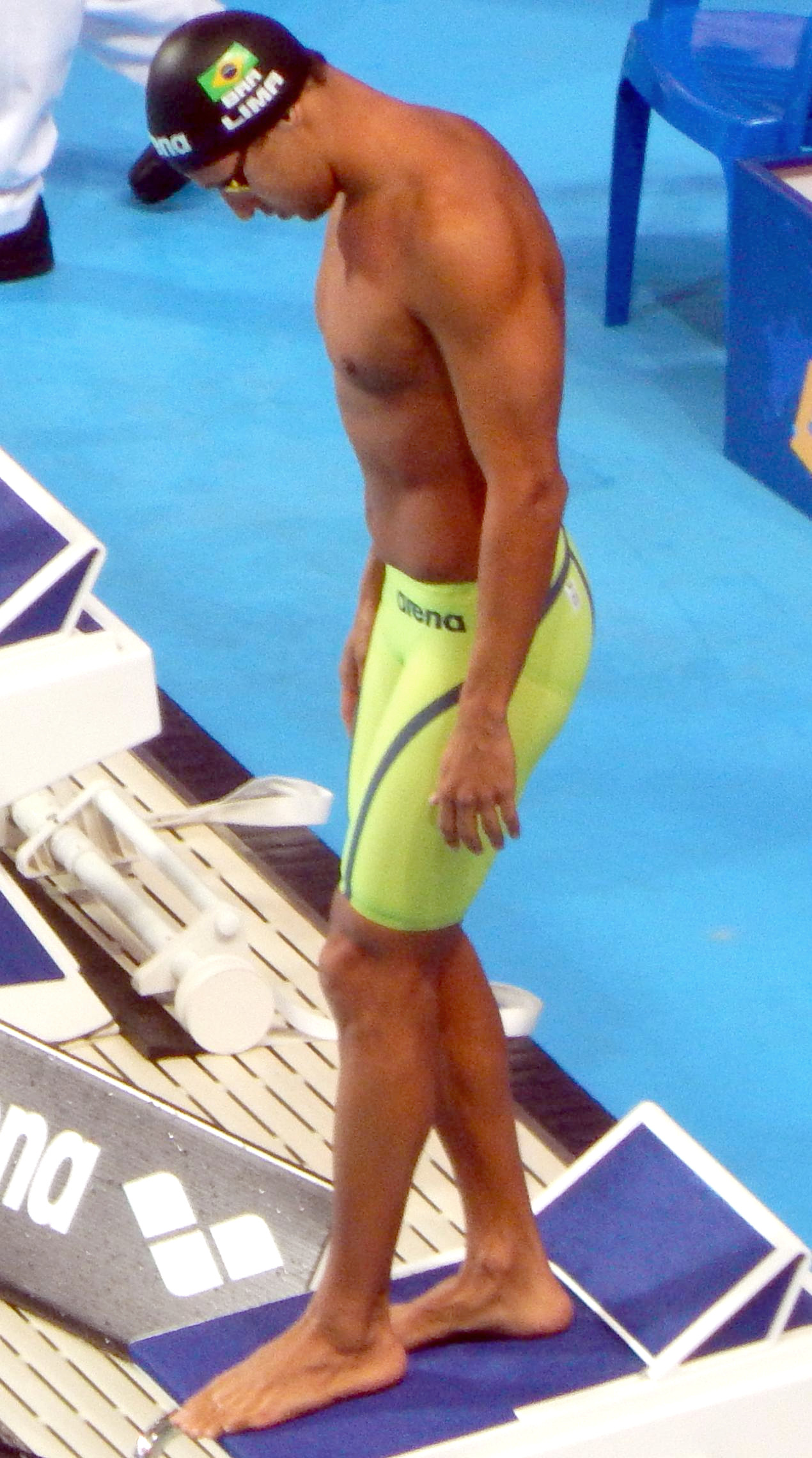
- Kazan 2015

Personal information
- Full name: Felipe Ferreira Lima
- Born: 5 April 1985 (age 41) Cuiabá, Mato Grosso, Brazil
- Height: 1.90 m (6 ft 3 in)
- Weight: 93 kg (205 lb)
- Spouse: Flavia Danigno (since 2018)

Sport
- Sport: Swimming
- Strokes: Breaststroke
- Club: Esporte Clube Pinheiros
Medal record
World Championships (LC)
Silver medal – second place	2019 Gwangju	50 m breaststroke
Bronze medal – third place	2013 Barcelona	100 m breaststroke
World Championships (SC)
Silver medal – second place	2016 Windsor	4×50 m mixed medley
Bronze medal – third place	2016 Windsor	50 m breaststroke
Bronze medal – third place	2018 Hangzhou	50 m breaststroke
Bronze medal – third place	2018 Hangzhou	4×50 m medley
Pan American Games
Gold medal – first place	2011 Guadalajara	4×100 m medley
Gold medal – first place	2015 Toronto	4×100 m medley
Silver medal – second place	2007 Rio	4×100 m medley
Silver medal – second place	2011 Guadalajara	100 m breaststroke
Silver medal – second place	2015 Toronto	100 m breaststroke
Silver medal – second place	2019 Lima	4×100 m medley
Universiade
Silver medal – second place	2007 Bangkok	50 m breaststroke
South American Games
Gold medal – first place	2014 Santiago	100 m breaststroke
Gold medal – first place	2014 Santiago	4×100 m medley

Felipe Ferreira Lima (born 5 April 1985) is a Brazilian swimmer. He has six medals in World Championships: two in long course, and four in short course, highlighting his bronze medal in the 100 metre breaststroke at the 2013 World Championships. At the 2012 Summer Olympics, he competed in the men's 100 metre breaststroke, finishing in 8th place in his semi-final and failing to reach the final.

== International career ==
=== 2006–2008 ===
Felipe Lima entered the 2006 FINA World Swimming Championships (25 m), in Shanghai, where he finished 12th in the 50-metre breaststroke and 17th in the 100-metre breaststroke. At the 2006 Pan Pacific Swimming Championships in Victoria, he finished 16th in the 100-metre breaststroke.

Lima previously held the South American record for the 4×100-metre medley relay in an Olympic-sized pool, with a time of 3:39.30, obtained on 9 September 2006 in Rio de Janeiro with Leonardo Guedes, Fernando Silva and César Cielo. He also broke the South American record in the 100-metre breaststroke, in a time of 1:01.56 on 10 September 2006, at the same competition in Rio, making him the first swimmer from Mato Grosso to hold a South American record in swimming. On 16 December 2006 he improved his record for the 100-metre breaststroke, doing 1:01.52.

At the 2007 World Aquatics Championships, he finished 24th in the 50-metre breaststroke and 30th in the 100-metre breaststroke. Participating in the 2007 Summer Universiade in Bangkok, Thailand, Lima won the silver medal in the 50-metre breaststroke, lowering the South American record to 27.94 seconds and becoming the first man on the continent to swim below 28 seconds in that event.

At the 2007 Pan American Games, in Rio de Janeiro, Lima earned a silver medal in the 4×100-metre medley relay. He also finished 5th in the 100-metre breaststroke.

In 2008, Lima obtained an Olympic qualifying time in the Brazilian trials for the 2008 Summer Olympics in the 100-metre breaststroke, with a time of 1:01.21, but was not entered as he finished 3rd place, and only two swimmers per country can go to the Olympics. Henrique Barbosa, with 1:00.79, and Felipe França, with 1:01.17, were the swimmers selected for the Brazilian national team.

=== 2009–2012 ===
Lima competed at the 2010 Pan Pacific Swimming Championships in Irvine, where he finished 8th in the 100-metre breaststroke, and 10th in the 50-metre breaststroke.

He competed at the 2011 World Aquatics Championships, in Shanghai, coming in 24th in the 100-metre breaststroke. At the 2011 Pan American Games, he won the silver medal in the 100-metre breaststroke and the gold medal in the 4×100-metre medley for participating in the qualifying round.

=== 2012 Summer Olympics ===
Lima first participated in the Olympics at the 2012 Summer Olympics in London, where he went to the semifinal of the 100-metre breaststroke, finishing in 13th place overall.

=== 2012–2016 ===
In the 2012 FINA World Swimming Championships (25 m), Lima obtained his best result in a World Championship, going to three finals: the 50-metre breaststroke (finished in 6th place), the 100-metre breaststroke (ranked 8th) and the 4×100-metre medley (finished in 4th position).

At the 2013 World Aquatics Championships in Barcelona, Lima made it to the 100-metre breaststroke final and placed fifth with a time of 59.84 seconds, breaking the 1-minute barrier for the first time. In the final, he again exceeded himself, reaching his personal best time without a high-tech suit, at 59.65 seconds, winning a historic bronze medal for Brazil. It was the first time in history that a Brazilian had won a medal in the 100-metre breaststroke at the World Championships. In the 50-metre breaststroke, he missed the World Championship final as he ran slower than in the heats, ending in 9th place. In the 4×100-metre medley he finished 12th, along with Leonardo de Deus, Marcelo Chierighini and Nicholas Santos.

At the 2014 South American Games in Santiago, Chile, Lima won two gold medals in the 100-metre breaststroke and 4×100-metre medley.

At the 2015 Pan American Games in Toronto, Ontario, Canada, Lima won the gold medal in the 4×100-metre medley relay, by participating at heats. Before, he had already won a silver medal in the 100-metre breaststroke.

At the 2015 World Aquatics Championships in Kazan, Lima finished 9th in the 4 × 100 metre mixed medley relay, along with Daynara de Paula, Daiene Dias and João de Lucca;, 10th in the Men's 4 × 100 metre medley relay., 12th in the Men's 50 metre breaststroke and 13th in the Men's 100 metre breaststroke.

=== 2016–present ===
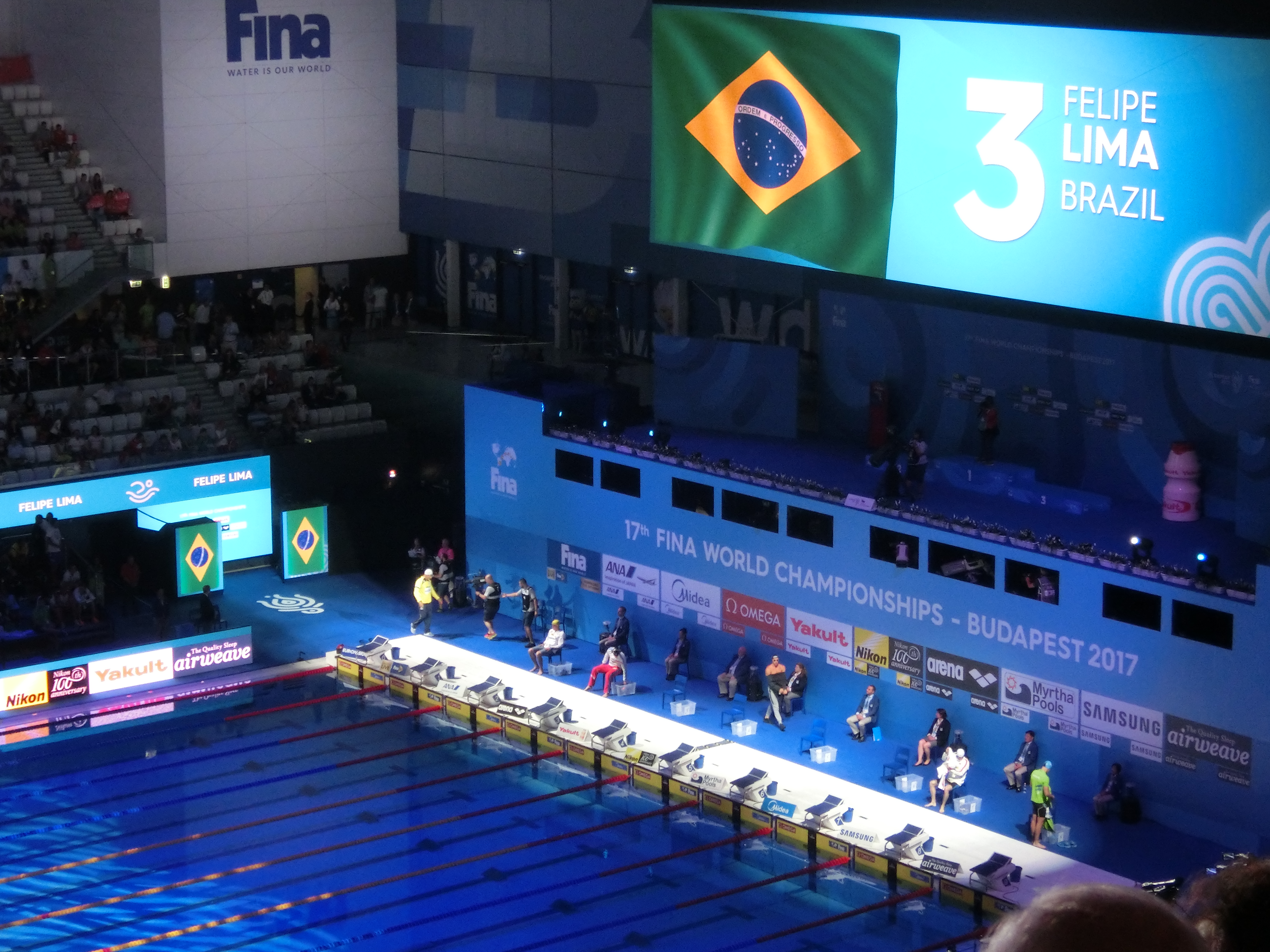
Felipe Lima in the 50 metre breaststroke at the 2017 World Aquatics Championships

At the 2016 FINA World Swimming Championships (25 m) in Windsor, Ontario, Canada, he won a silver medal at the 4 × 50 metre mixed medley relay, along with Etiene Medeiros, Larissa Oliveira and Nicholas Santos. On 11 December, Lima won the bronze medal in the Men's 50 metre breaststroke final. He also finished 10th in the Men's 100 metre breaststroke.

At the 2017 World Aquatics Championships in Budapest, he finished 4th in the Men's 50 metre breaststroke and 10h in the Men's 100 metre breaststroke. He also helped Brazil's 4 × 100 metre medley relay to go to the final, swimming at heats.

At the 2018 FINA World Swimming Championships (25 m) in Hangzhou, China, he won the bronze medal in the Men's 50 metre breaststroke, with a time of 25.80. He also won a bronze medal in the Men's 4 × 50 metre medley relay, along with Guilherme Guido, César Cielo and Nicholas Santos. He also finished 4th in the Men's 4 × 100 metre medley relay, and 12th in the Men's 100 metre breaststroke.

At the Mare Nostrum held in June 2019 in Monte Carlo, he was able to beat the Americas record in the 50m breaststroke with a time of 26.33.

At the 2019 World Aquatics Championships in Gwangju, South Korea, Lima won the silver medal in the Men's 50 metre breaststroke, losing only to Adam Peaty, the world record holder of 50 and 100m breaststroke. It was the first time that Brazil got two medals in the same event, in a World Championship: Lima got the silver, and João Gomes Júnior, the bronze. He also finished 18th in the Men's 100 metre breaststroke.

At the 2019 Pan American Games held in Lima, Peru, he won a silver medal in the Men's 4 × 100 metre medley relay, by participating at heats. He also finished 4th in the Men's 100 metre breaststroke.

=== 2020 Summer Olympics ===
At the 2020 Summer Olympics in Tokyo, Lima almost broke the South American record in the Men's 100 metre breaststroke heats, with a time of 59.17. At 36 years of age, he broke his personal record in the race. In the semifinals, he finished 12th.

== Records ==
Felipe Lima holds, or formerly held, the following records:

Race	Time	Date	Record	Pool	Notes
4 × 100 m medley	3:39.30	9 September 2006	South American	Long Course	With Leonardo Guedes, Fernando Silva and César Cielo
100 m breaststroke	1:01.52	16 December 2006	South American	Long Course	
100 m breaststroke	58.86	18 October 2008	South American	Short Course	
50 m breaststroke	27.58	9 May 2008	South American	Long Course	
50 m breaststroke	26.61	6 November 2009	South American	Short Course	

== Personal life ==
In May 2018, Lima married Flávia Danigno, and in February 2022, they announced they were pregnant with their first child.
