= Ava Ohlgren =

American swimmer (born 1988)

Personal information
- Full name: Ava Bailey Ohlgren
- National team: United States
- Born: January 31, 1988 (age 38) Morganton, North Carolina, U.S.
- Height: 5 ft 9 in (175 cm)

Sport
- Sport: Swimming
- Strokes: Freestyle, medley
- College team: Auburn University
Medal record
Women's swimming
Representing the United States
Pan American Games
Gold medal – first place	2007 Rio de Janeiro	200 m freestyle
Gold medal – first place	2007 Rio de Janeiro	4x200 m freestyle
Summer Universiade
Gold medal – first place	2009 Belgrade	200 m medley
Gold medal – first place	2009 Belgrad	400 m medley
Gold medal – first place	2009 Belgrad	4x100 m freestyle
Gold medal – first place	2009 Belgrad	4x200 m freestyle
Gold medal – first place	2009 Belgrad	4x100 m medley

Ava Ohlgren (born January 31, 1988) is an American competition swimmer who has represented the United States in international events.

== Career ==
Ohlgren is a former NCAA champion in the 400 y IM (2007) and 200 y IM (2008). At the 2007 Pan American Games, Ohlgren won the 200 m freestyle and swam the third leg of the 4x20 0m freestyle relay, which also won gold. Ohlgren competed at the 2009 World University Games and won five gold medals, the most for any athlete from Auburn.
