= Julia Smit =

American swimmer (born 1987)

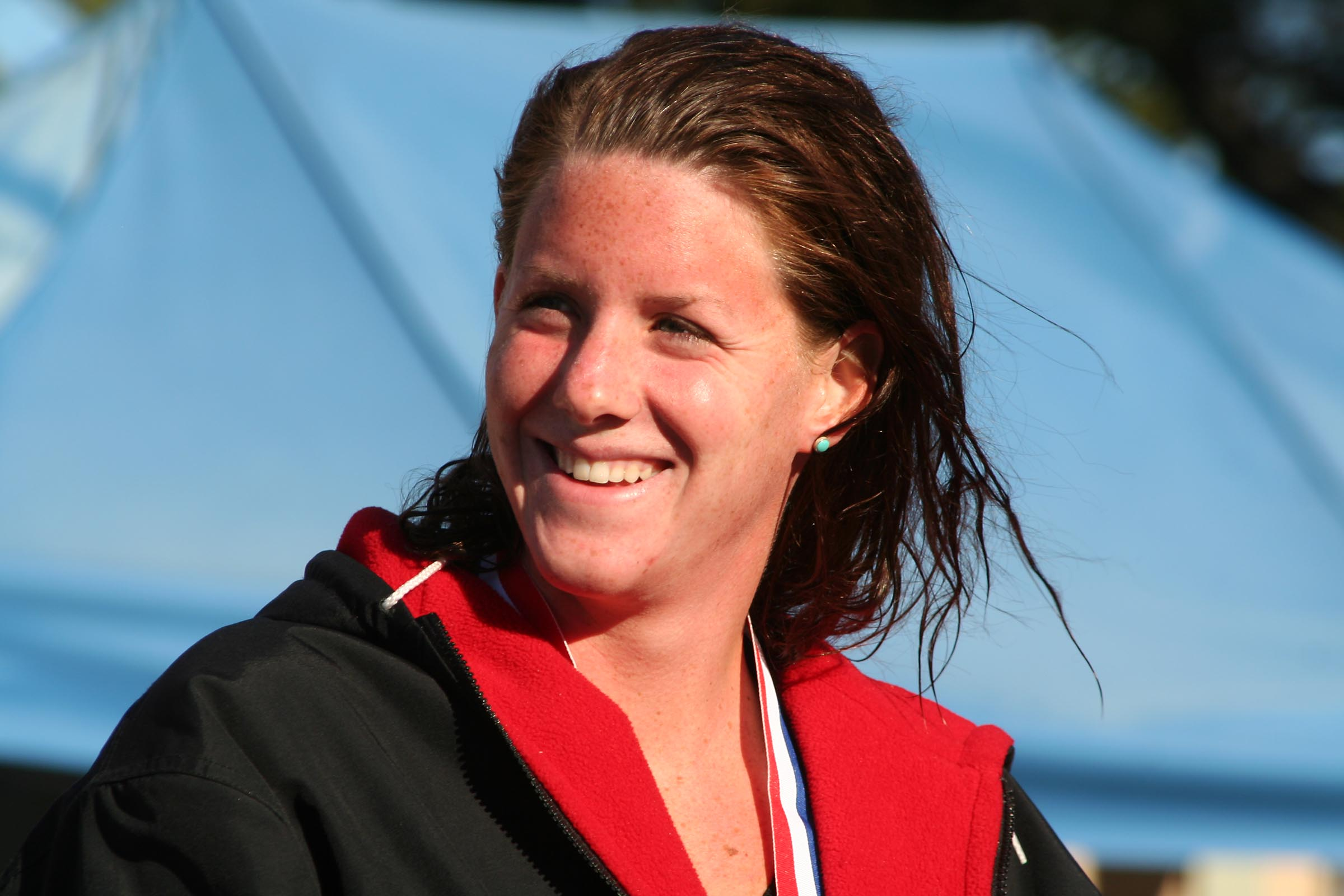
- Smit in 2007

Personal information
- Full name: Julia Elizabeth Smit
- National team: United States
- Born: December 14, 1987 (age 38) Santa Rosa, California, U.S.
- Height: 6 ft 0 in (183 cm)
- Weight: 146 lb (66 kg)

Sport
- Sport: Swimming
- Strokes: Backstroke, freestyle, individual medley
- Club: Three Village Swim Club
- College team: Stanford University
Medal record
Women's swimming
Representing the United States
Olympic Games
Silver medal – second place	2008 Beijing	4x100 m freestyle
Bronze medal – third place	2008 Beijing	4x200 m freestyle
Pan American Games
Gold medal – first place	2007 Rio	100 m backstroke
Gold medal – first place	2007 Rio	200 m medley
Gold medal – first place	2007 Rio	4x100 m freestyle
Gold medal – first place	2007 Rio	4x100 m medley
Gold medal – first place	2011 Guadalajara	200 m medley
Gold medal – first place	2011 Guadalajara	400 m medley
Silver medal – second place	2007 Rio	200 m backstroke

Julia Elizabeth Smit (born December 14, 1987) is an American competition swimmer, two-time Olympic medalist, and former world record-holder in two events. She has won a total of nine medals in major international competition, six golds, two silvers, and one bronze spanning the Olympics and Pan American Games.

== Personal ==
She graduated from Mount Sinai High School on Long Island, New York. Both of her parents were born in the Netherlands. Her father, Peter, is a swim coach. Smit has an older brother, Mike, and a younger brother, Kevin, who are also swimmers. Smit attended Stanford University, where she was an anthropology major and a member of the Stanford Cardinal swimming and diving team.

== Swimming career ==
As a high school student-athlete, Smit set New York state records in the 100-yard backstroke and 200-yard individual medley, swimming with the Three Village Swim Club.

Smit received an athletic scholarship to attend Stanford University, where she was a five-time national champion for the Stanford Cardinal swimming and diving team, having won the 400-yard individual medley three times (2008, 2009, 2010) and the 200-yard individual medley twice (2009, 2010). Smit is the current American record holder in the 200 and 400-yard individual medley (short course), and 200 and 400-meter individual medley (short course). Smit received the 2009–10 Honda Sports Award for Swimming and Diving, recognizing her as the outstanding college female swimmer of the year.

=== 2007–08 ===
At the 2007 Pan American Games, Smit won the gold medal in the 100 m backstroke, 200 m IM, 4 × 100 m freestyle relay, and 4 × 100 m medley relay. Smit also won a silver medal in the 200 m backstroke.

At the 2008 U.S. Olympic Team Trials, Smit finished third in the 200-meter freestyle and sixth in the 100-meter freestyle, earning berths for the 4x100 and 4×200-meter freestyle relays. Smit also finished third in the 400-meter individual medley at the trials. Smit was a member of the silver medal-winning U.S. team in the 4×100-meter freestyle relay and the bronze medal-winning team in the 4×200-meter freestyle relay at the 2008 Summer Olympics, swimming in the preliminary heats of both relay events.

On November 28, 2008, Smit set her first world record at the Canada Cup in Toronto, Ontario, breaking Kirsty Coventry's short course 400-meter individual medley record.

=== 2009 ===
At the 2009 U.S. National Championships and World Championship Trials, Smit won her first national title in the 200-meter individual medley in 2:09.34, setting a new American record. Smit also placed second in the 400-meter individual medley, and fourth in the 100-meter freestyle with a career-best 54.38. At the 2009 World Aquatics Championships in Rome, Smit placed ninth in the 200-meter individual medley (2:10.29), barely missing a place in the final. Smit also swam in the preliminaries of the 4×100-meter freestyle, which placed fourth in the final, and the freestyle leg of the 4×100-meter medley relay, which did not advance to the final.

At the 2009 Duel in the Pool, Smit reclaimed the world record in the short course 400 m individual medley with a time of 4:21.04. One day later, she also broke the world record in the 200 m individual medley with a time of 2:04.60.

== See also ==
- List of Olympic medalists in swimming (women)
- List of Stanford University people
- World record progression 200 metres individual medley
- World record progression 400 metres individual medley

Records
Preceded by Kirsty Coventry; Katheryn Meaklim	Women's 400-meter individual medley world record-holder (short course); November 28, 2008 – December 14, 2008; December 18, 2009 – August 11, 2013	Succeeded by Mireia Belmonte; Katinka Hosszú
Preceded by Evelyn Verrasztó	Women's 200-meter individual medley world record-holder (short course); December 19, 2009 – August 7, 2013	Succeeded by Katinka Hosszú
