= Nikia Deveaux =

Bahamian swimmer (born 1985)

Personal information
- Full name: Nikia Hillarie Deveaux
- National team: Bahamas
- Born: 28 September 1985 (age 40)
- Height: 5 ft 5 in (1.65 m)
- Weight: 62 kg (137 lb)

Sport
- Sport: Swimming
- Strokes: Freestyle
- Club: Barracuda Swim Club (BAH)
- College team: University of Kentucky (USA)
Medal record
Women's swimming
Representing Bahamas
Pan American Games
Bronze medal – third place	2007 Rio de Janeiro	4x100 m medley

Nikia Hillarie Deveaux (born September 28, 1985) is a female freestyle swimmer from the Bahamas. She swam for the Bahamas at the 2004 Summer Olympics. At the 2007 Pan American Games she was part of the bronze medal-winning women's 4 × 100 m medley relay alongside Alicia Lightbourne, Arianna Vanderpool and Alana Dillette.

== See also ==
- Swimming at the 2007 Pan American Games
