= Canada at the 2007 Pan American Games =

- IOC code: CAN
- NOC: Canadian Olympic Committee

in Rio de Janeiro 13–29 July 2007
- Competitors: 495
- Flag bearer: Susan Nattrass
- Medals Ranked 4th: Gold 39 Silver 44 Bronze 55 Total 138

Pan American Games appearances (overview)
- 1955; 1959; 1963; 1967; 1971; 1975; 1979; 1983; 1987; 1991; 1995; 1999; 2003; 2007; 2011; 2015; 2019; 2023

This is a list of medals won by participants representing Canada at the 2007 Pan American Games.

== Medals ==
=== Gold ===
===== Athletics =====
- Men's 400 m hurdles: Adam Kunkel
- Men's hammer throw: James Steacy
- Men's shot put: Dylan Armstrong
- Women's 800 metres: Diane Cummins
- Women's 5000 metres: Megan Metcalfe
- Women's heptathlon: Jessica Zelinka

===== Badminton =====
- Men's singles: Mike Beres
- Men's doubles: Mike Beres and William Milroy

===== Canoeing =====
- Men's K-1 1000 m: Angus Mortimer
- Women's K-2 500 m: Kia Byers and Marie-Christine Schmidt
- Women's K-1 500 m: Jillian D'Alessio

===== Cycling =====
- Women's time trial: Anne Samplonius
- Women's mountain-biking: Catharine Pendrel

===== Diving =====
- Men's 3 m springboard: Alexandre Despatie
- Women's 10 m platform synchronized: Émilie Heymans and Marie-Ève Marleau

===== Equestrian =====
- Individual jumping: Jill Henselwood

===== Fencing =====
- Men's individual sabre: Philippe Beaudry

===== Field hockey =====
- Men's tournament: Canada national field hockey team
  - Ranjeev Deol, Wayne Fernandes, Connor Grimes, Ravi Kahlon, Bindi Kullar, Mike Mahood, Matt Peck, Ken Pereira, Scott Sandison, Marian Schole, Peter Short, Rob Short, Gabbar Singh, Scott Tupper, Paul Wettlaufer and Anthony Wright

===== Gymnastics =====
- Women's rhythmic gymnastics clubs: Alexandra Orlando
- Women's rhythmic gymnastics rope: Alexandra Orlando
- Women's rhythmic gymnastics hoop: Alexandra Orlando

===== Gymnastics =====
- Women's individual trampoline: Karen Cockburn

===== Karate =====
- Men's 70 kg: Saeed Baghbani

===== Rowing =====
- Men's lightweight coxless fours: Adam Reynolds, Andrew Borden, John Haver and Paul Amesbury
- Women's quadruple sculls: Nathalie Maurer, Zoe Hoskins, Peggy Hyslop and Cristin McCarty
- Men's pair: Chris Jarvis and Dan Casaca

===== Sailing =====
- Women's RS:X: Dominique Vallee

===== Shooting =====
- Women's trap: Susan Nattrass
- Women's 10 m air pistol: Avianna Chao

===== Squash =====
- Women's team event: Alana Miller, Runa Reta and Carolyn Russell

===== Swimming =====
- Men's 100 m breaststroke: Scott Dickens

===== Taekwondo =====
- Women's welterweight: Karine Sergerie

===== Water skiing =====
- Men's tricks: Jaret Llewellyn
- Men's jumps: Jaret Llewellyn
- Men's slalom: Drew Ross
- Women's tricks: Whitney McClintock
- Women's slalom: Whitney McClintock

===== Wrestling =====
- Men's freestyle 84 kg: Roozbah Banihashemi
- Women's freestyle 48 kg: Carol Huynh

=== Silver ===
===== Archery =====
- Women's team competition: Marie-Pier Baudet, Kristen Niles and Kateri Vrakking
- Men's team competition: Crispin Duenas, Jason Lyon and Hugh MacDonald

===== Athletics =====
- Men's 4 × 100 m relay: Anson Henry, Richard Adu-Bobie, Jared Connaughton and Bryan Barnett
- Men's 400 metres: Tyler Christopher
- Women's high jump: Nicole Forrester
- Women's 100 m hurdles: Perdita Felicien

===== Badminton =====
- Women's singles competition: Charmaine Reed
- Women's doubles competition: Fiona McKee and Charmaine Reed
- Mixed competition: Mike Beres and Val Loker

===== Canoeing =====
- Men's K-1 500 m: Angus Mortimer
- Men's K-4 1000 m: Angus Mortimer, Jeremy Bordeleau, Mark de Jonge and Chris Pellini

===== Cycling =====
- Men's keirin: Cam MacKinnon

===== Gymnastics =====
- Men's individual trampoline: Jason Burnett
- Women's individual trampoline: Rosannagh MacLennan

===== Equestrian =====
- Team jumping: Mac Cone, Karen Cudmore, Jill Henselwood, Eric Lamaze and Ian Millar
- Team eventing: Kyle Carter, Sandra Donnelly, Mike Winter and Waylon Roberts
- Team dressage: Andrea Bresee, Diane Creech, Tom Dvorak and Karen Pavicic

===== Fencing =====
- Men's sabre team competition: Michel Boulos, Philippe Beaudry and Nicolas Mayer
- Women's individual épée: Julie Leprohon
- Women's sabre team competition: Olga Ovtchinnikova, Sandra Sassine and Julie Cloutier
- Women's foil team competition: Louise-Hélène Bouchard, Monica Kwan and Élise Daoust

===== Judo =====
- Men's half-heavyweight (−100 kg): Keith Morgan

===== Modern pentathlon =====
- Women's individual competition: Monica Pinette

===== Rowing =====
- Women's double sculls: Peggy Hyslop and Cristin McCarty
- Women's pair: Zoe Hoskins and Nathalie Maurer

===== Squash =====
- Men's team competition: Shahier Razik, Shawn DeLierre and Robin Clarke
- Women's singles competition: Alana Miller

===== Swimming =====
- Women's 200 m freestyle: Stephanie Horner
- Women's 100 m breaststroke: Annamay Pierse
- Women's 200 m breaststroke: Annamay Pierse
- Women's 4 × 100 m freestyle: Elizabeth Collins, Seanna Mitchell, Chanelle Charron-Watson and Hilary Bell
- Women's 4 × 200 m freestyle: Chanelle Charron-Watson, Elizabeth Collins, Hilary Bell and Stephanie Horner
- Women's 4 × 100 m medley: Elizabeth Wycliffe, Annamay Pierse, Stephanie Horner and Chanelle Charron-Watson

===== Synchronized swimming =====
- Women's duet: Marie-Pier Boudreau Gagnon and Isabelle Rampling
- Women's team competition: Marie-Pier Boudreau Gagnon, Jessika Dubuc, Marie-Pierre Gagné, Dominika Kopcik, Ève Lamoureux, Tracy Little, Élise Marcotte, Isabelle Rampling and Jennifer Song

===== Softball =====
- Women's tournament: Canada women's national softball team

===== Table tennis =====
- Women's team competition: Chris Xu, Mo Zhang and Judy Long

===== Taekwondo =====
- Women's featherweight (−57 kg): Shannon Condie

===== Triathlon =====
- Men's individual competition: Brent McMahon

===== Water polo =====
- Women's tournament: Canada women's national water polo team
  - Krystina Alogbo, Joëlle Békhazi, Alison Braden, Cora Campbell, Tara Campbell, Emily Csikos, Whynter Lamarre, Sandra Lizé, Dominique Perreault, Marina Radu, Rachel Riddell, Christine Robinson and Rosanna Tomiuk

===== Water skiing =====
- Men's jumps: Ryan Dodd
- Men's wakeboard: Brad Buskas
- Women's jumps: Whitney McClintock

===== Weightlifting =====
- Women's 63 kg: Christine Girard

===== Wrestling =====
- Women's freestyle 72 kg: Ohenewa Akuffo

=== Bronze ===
===== Badminton =====
- Women's singles competition: Sarah MacMaster

===== Diving =====
- Men's 10 m platform: Alexandre Despatie
- Men's 3 m springboard synchronized: Alexandre Despatie and Arturo Miranda
- Women's 3 m springboard synchronized: Meaghan Benfeito and Kelly MacDonald

===== Football =====
- Women's tournament: Canada women's national soccer team
  - Sasha Andrews, Melanie Booth, Candace Chapman, Martina Franko, Randee Hermuss, Kristina Kiss, Kara Lang, Karina LeBlanc, Diana Matheson, Andrea Neil, Christine Sinclair, Taryn Swiatek, Melissa Tancredi, Katie Thorlakson, Brittany Timko, Amy Vermeulen, Amy Walsh and Rhian Wilkinson

===== Swimming =====
- Men's 200 m freestyle: Adam Sioui
- Men's 1500 m freestyle: Kier Maitland
- Men's 100 m breaststroke: Mathieu Bois
- Men's 400 m individual medley: Keith Beavers
- Men's 4 × 200 m freestyle: Chad Hankewich, Stefan Hirniak, Pascal Wollach and Adam Sioui
- Men's 4 × 100 m medley: Matthew Hawes, Scott Dickens, Joe Bartoch and Adam Sioui
- Women's 800 m freestyle: Savannah King
- Women's 100 m backstroke: Elizabeth Wycliffe
- Women's 200 m backstroke: Elizabeth Wycliffe
- Women's 200 m individual medley: Stephanie Horner
- Women's 10 km open water: Tanya Hunks

===== Water polo =====
- Men's tournament: Canada men's national water polo team
  - Aaron Feltham, Kevin Graham, Brandon Jung, Con Kudaba, Thomas Marks, Nathaniel Miller, Noah Miller, Kevin Mitchell, Robin Randall, Andrew Robinson, Jean Sayegh, Daniel Stein and Nic Youngblud

== Results by event ==
=== Basketball ===
==== Men's tournament ====
- Preliminary round (group A)
  - Lost to Puerto Rico (63–82)
  - Lost to Brazil (63–98)
  - Lost to US Virgin Islands (67–74)
- Classification round
  - 5th/8th place: Lost to Panama (67–68)
  - 7th/8th place: Defeated US Virgin Islands (69–60) → 7th place
- Team roster
  - Osvaldo Jeanty
  - Jermaine Anderson
  - Ryan Bell
  - Paul Larmand
  - Rans Brempong
  - Andy Rautins
  - Aaron Doornekamp
  - Jesse Wade Young
  - Jermaine Bucknor
  - Sean Denison
  - Vlad Kuljanin
- Head coach: Leo Rautins

==== Women's tournament ====
- Preliminary round (group A)
  - Defeated Mexico (74–63)
  - Defeated Jamaica (58–46)
  - Lost to Brazil (63–77)
- Semi-finals
  - Lost to United States (59–75)
- Bronze medal match
  - Lost to Cuba (49–62) → 4th place
- Team roster
  - Jordan Adams
  - Kelsey Adrian
  - Uzo Asagawara
  - Chelsea Aubry
  - Amanda Brown
  - Devon Campbell
  - Sarah Crooks
  - Gabriele Kleindienst
  - Lizanne Murphy
  - Tamara Tatham
  - Sheila Townsend
  - Carrie Watson
- Head coach: Alison McNeill

=== Triathlon ===
==== Men's competition ====
- Brent McMahon
  - 1:52:38.19 — Silver medal
- Kyle Jones
  - 1:53:05.25 — 4th place
- Paul Tichelaar
  - 1:54:03.16 — 11th place

==== Women's competition ====
- Lauren Groves
  - 1:59:50.38 — Bronze medal
- Kathy Tremblay
  - 2:00:25.90 — 4th place

=== Volleyball ===
==== Men's tournament ====
- Preliminary round (group A)
  - Lost to Brazil (0–3)
  - Defeated Mexico (3–1)
  - Lost to Cuba (0–3)
- Classification round
  - 5th/8th place: Lost to Argentina (2–3)
  - 7th/8th place: Defeated Mexico (3–0) → 7th place
- Team roster
  - Christian Bernier
  - Daniel Lewis
  - Michael Munday
  - Jeremy Wilcox
  - Dallas Soonias
  - Paul Duerden
  - Brett Youngberg
  - Chris Wolfenden
  - Murray Grapentine (c)
  - Frederic Winters
  - Leo Carroll
  - Nicholas Cundy
- Head coach: Glenn Hoag

== See also ==
- Canada at the 2006 Commonwealth Games
- Canada at the 2008 Summer Olympics
