= Elizabeth Collins =

Canadian swimmer (born 1982)

Personal information
- Full name: Elizabeth Collins
- Born: November 29, 1982 (age 43) Ottawa, Ontario, Canada
- Height: 1.80 m (5 ft 11 in)
- Weight: 65 kg (143 lb)

Sport
- Sport: Swimming
- Strokes: Freestyle
- Club: UBC Dolphins
- College team: University of British Columbia
Medal record
Representing Canada
Pan American Games
Silver medal – second place	2003 Santo Domingo	4×100 m freestyle
Silver medal – second place	2003 Santo Domingo	4×100 m medley
Silver medal – second place	2007 Rio de Janeiro	4×100 m freestyle
Silver medal – second place	2007 Rio de Janeiro	4×200 m freestyle
Silver medal – second place	2007 Rio de Janeiro	4×100 m medley
Bronze medal – third place	2003 Santo Domingo	4×200 m freestyle

Elizabeth "Liz" Collins (born November 29, 1982) is a female swimmer from Canada, who mostly competes in the freestyle events. Collins won three silver medals at the 2007 Pan American Games in Rio de Janeiro, Brazil. She is starting her third year of coaching Vancouver Pacific Swim Club in Vancouver, British Columbia.
