= Barbados at the 2007 Pan American Games =

- IOC code: BAR
- NOC: Barbados Olympic Association

in Rio de Janeiro 13–29 July 2007
- Competitors: 65
- Flag bearer: Vera Angela Jones
- Medals Ranked 25th: Gold 0 Silver 0 Bronze 1 Total 1

Pan American Games appearances (overview)
- 1963; 1967; 1971; 1975; 1979; 1983; 1987; 1991; 1995; 1999; 2003; 2007; 2011; 2015; 2019; 2023

The 15th Pan-American Games were held in Rio de Janeiro, Brazil, between 13 July 2007 and 29 July 2007.

== Medals ==
=== Bronze ===
===== Swimming =====
- Men's 200m Individual Medley: Bradley Ally
