= Matthew Hawes =

Canadian swimmer (born 1986)

Personal information
- Full name: Matthew Hawes
- Nationality: Canada
- Born: February 13, 1986 (age 40) Pointe-Claire, Quebec
- Height: 1.83 m (6 ft 0 in)
- Weight: 73 kg (161 lb)

Sport
- Sport: Swimming
- Strokes: Backstroke
- Club: Ravens of Carleton University
- College team: University of Ottawa
Medal record
Men's swimming
Pan American Games
| Bronze medal – third place | 2007 Rio de Janeiro | 4x100 m medley |

Matthew Hawes (born February 13, 1986, in Pointe-Claire, Quebec) is a male swimmer from Canada, who mostly competes in the backstroke events.

Hawes' first international honour was a bronze medal (4 × 100 m medley relay) at the 2007 Pan American Games in Rio de Janeiro, Brazil . He narrowly missed the 2008 Olympic team.

At the 2009 World Aquatic Trials in Montreal, Hawes set a new national record in the 200-metre backstroke (1:57.34), earning him a spot in the World Championship team. After competing at the World Championships and reaching 18th position, he broke the longest standing men's National record in Leeds, England in the 200-metre backstroke (SC) with a time of 1:52.21.

Hawes held the 200m Backstroke Canadian record for just over ten years until it was broken in 2019 by Markus Thormeyer at the 2019 World Aquatic Championships.

Matt Hawes has won 34 national titles, and has broken 6 Canadian records over his career. He won his 34th national title at the 2011 World Championship trials in the 200m backstroke. His time of 1:58.89 was the 8th fastest time in the world in 2011.

In 2011, after a disappointing World Championship result, Hawes started training with previous assistant coach of the Texas Longhorn Men's Varsity Swim Team, Bobby Folan, at the University of Sydney, Australia. There he was working with Matt Jaukovich, previous 50m butterfly world record holder on the technical aspects of his main event (the 200m backstroke). His coach Bobby Folan was under the tutelage of Eddie Reese in Texas, where they both coached Aaron Peirsol, Garreth Weber-Gale and Brendan Hansen to the 2008 Olympic Games.

Hawes has been on the national team of Canada since 2003.
