= Adam Sioui =

Canadian swimmer (born 1982)

Personal information
- Full name: Adam Carter Sioui
- National team: Canada
- Born: May 10, 1982 (age 44) Trenton, Ontario
- Height: 1.96 m (6 ft 5 in)
- Weight: 88 kg (194 lb)

Sport
- Sport: Swimming
- Strokes: Butterfly, freestyle
- College team: University of Calgary; University of Florida
Medal record
Men's swimming
Representing Canada
Pan American Games
Bronze medal – third place	2007 Rio de Janeiro	200 m freestyle
Bronze medal – third place	2007 Rio de Janeiro	4x200 m freestyle
Bronze medal – third place	2007 Rio de Janeiro	4x100 m medley

Adam Carter Sioui (born May 10, 1982) is a former competition swimmer who represented Canada in international events. He was a butterfly and freestyle specialist and was the Canadian national record-holder in the 200-metre butterfly.

== Early years ==
Sioui was born in Trenton, Ontario, Canada.

== U.S. college career ==
Sioui attended the University of Florida in Gainesville, Florida, where he swam for coach Gregg Troy's Florida Gators swimming and diving team in National Collegiate Athletic Association (NCAA) competition from 2002 to 2005. During his four-year college career, he received nineteen All-American honours and was the NCAA national champion in the 200-yard freestyle in 2002.

== International career ==
At 2007 Canadian National Championships, he won gold in the 100-metre freestyle, 100-metre butterfly and 200-metre butterfly. He competed in the 2008 Summer Olympics in 100-metre and 200-metre butterfly and his Canadian team finished fifth in the 4x200-metre freestyle relay. He received a National Aboriginal Achievement Award, now known as the Indspire Awards in 2009.

== See also ==
- List of University of Florida alumni
- List of University of Florida Olympians
