= Stephanie Horner =

Canadian swimmer (born 1989)

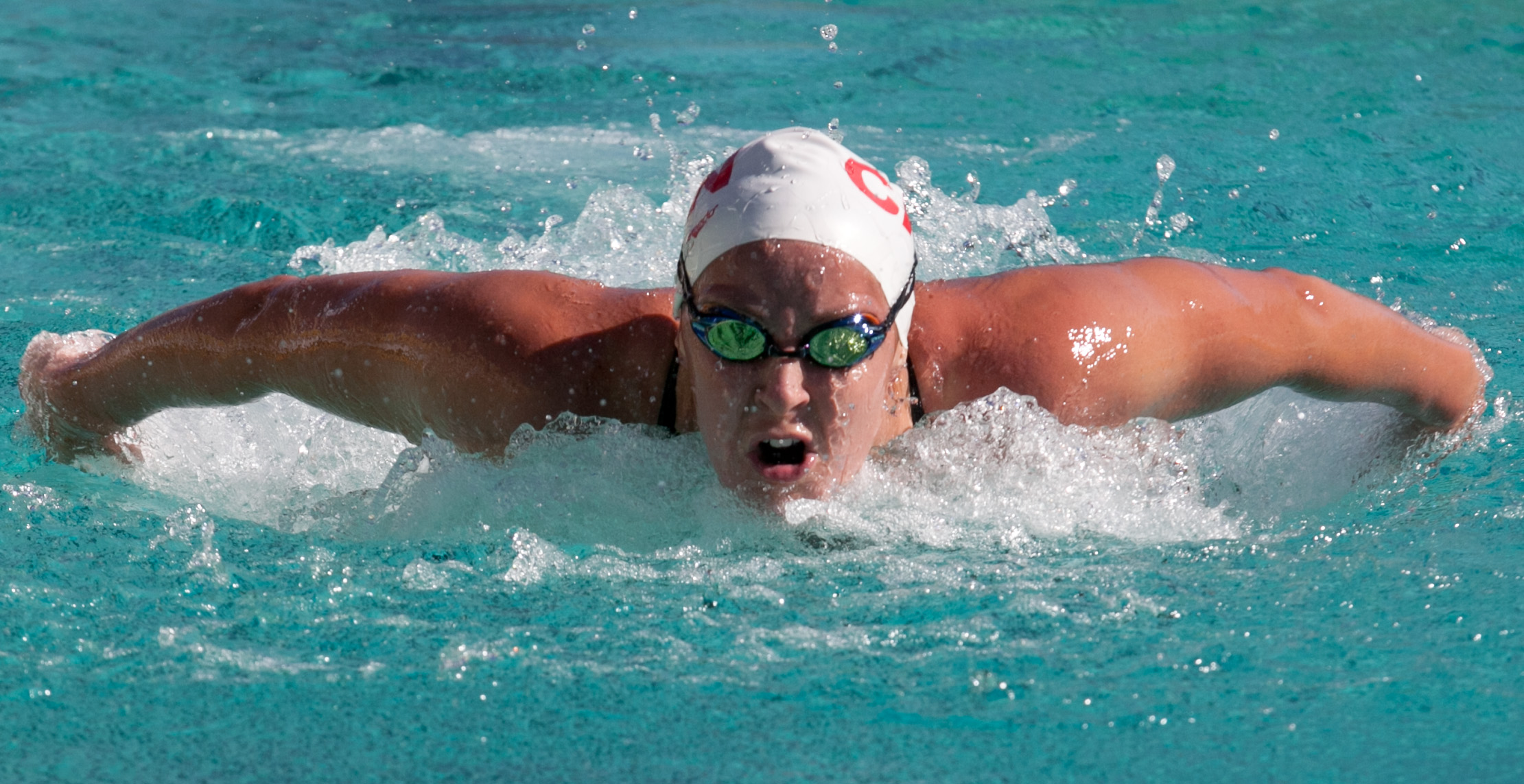
- Horner swimming butterfly at the 2012 Santa Clara Grand Prix

Personal information
- Full name: Stephanie Horner
- Nickname: Steph
- National team: Canada
- Born: March 19, 1989 (age 37) Bathurst, New Brunswick, Canada
- Height: 1.78 m (5 ft 10 in)
- Weight: 70 kg (154 lb)

Sport
- Sport: Swimming
- Strokes: Butterfly, freestyle
- Club: Beaconsfield Bluefins; Island Swimming, Victoria, B.C.
- College team: University of Victoria (2014)
- Coach: Russ Franklin (Bluefins); Dr. Peter Vizsolyi (U. Victoria); Randy Bennett (Island Swimming); Brad Dingey (Vancouver HPC)
Medal record
Women's swimming
Representing Canada
Pan American Games
Silver medal – second place	2007 Rio de Janeiro	200 m freestyle
Silver medal – second place	2007 Rio de Janeiro	4×200 m freestyle
Silver medal – second place	2007 Rio de Janeiro	4×100 m medley
Bronze medal – third place	2007 Rio de Janeiro	200 m medley

Stephanie Horner (born March 19, 1989) was a competition swimmer from Canada who swam for the University of Victoria and represented Canada in the 2008, 2012, and 2016 Olympics. She is a butterfly and freestyle specialist who won four medals in the 2007 Pan American Games in Rio de Janeiro and in 2015 began specializing in open water distance events.

== Early life and swimming ==
Horner was born March 19, 1989, in Bathurst, New Brunswick (CAN) to Danielle Felx and Emil Horner, the oldest of three siblings, though the family later moved to Beaconsville, Quebec when Stephanie was in elementary school. Stephanie began as a competitive summer swimmer at the age of nine at the Beaurepaire summer pool in 1998, but soon started as a year-round swimming competitor with the Beaconsville Bluefins, an accomplished program under Coach Russ Franklin where she excelled in competition early, and soon distinguished herself as a potential champion. Franklin mentored several future Olympians with the Bluefins, where he would continue to coach through 2011. Stephanie would continue to swim with the Bluefins when returning to Beaconsville in the summers throughout her High School swimming career. In her early years of competition, she initially enjoyed butterfly for the challenge it presented, but would soon transition to the Individual Medley as her more favored event.

=== Queen of Angels Academy ===
By age 12 she attended Queen of Angels Academy in Montreal where she swam six days a week in morning and evening two hour sessions. While attending Queen of Angels in the Spring of 2004, Stephanie swam a Quebec Provincial record time of 56.67 for the 100-meter freestyle at the Eastern Canadian Short Course Championships, where she won a total of five gold medals. Though her first language was French, she later attended Marianapolis College, a private English speaking preparatory school with strong academics in Montreal, graduating in 2008.

At only 15 in the 2004 Canadian Olympic trials in early July in Toronto, Horner placed fifth in the 400 meter freestyle. An exceptional performance for a young swimmer, she was named "Rookie of the Meet", though she did not qualify for the Canadian team. Horner's earliest well-known international meet came at the junior level at the 2005 Junior Pan Pacific Championship when she captured a bronze in the 200-m freestyle. Horner made her first senior national team meet at Victoria's 2006 Pan Pacific Championships. She competed in four events, with her highest finish, a 12th place in the 200-meter Individual Medley.

=== 2007 Pan American Games ===
At a high point in her career at the 2007 Pan American games in Rio de Janeiro, Horner won a silver medal in the 200m freestyle in a time of 2:00.29 and captured a bronze medal in the 200m IM with a time of 2:15.42. She won a silver in the 4 × 200 m freestyle and another silver in the 4x100 meter medley.

=== Auburn University ===
Horner enrolled at Auburn University on an athletic scholarship beginning in the 2008–9 season, where she would have competed for Hall of Fame Coach Richard Quick but was not eligible to compete in her Freshman year.

The college was not a good fit, and she returned to train for Coach Randy Bennett at Island Swimming/Victoria Swim Academy in Victoria, British Columbia, formerly known as the Victoria Amateur Swim Club. An accomplished mentor to Canadian champions, Bennett would serve as the Head Coach for the Canadian Olympic Team in the 2012 Olympics. At Island swimming, Horner swam primarily at Saanich Commonwealth Place, a premier facility which featured a 25-meter lap pool, a 50-meter competition pool, a large diving well, and an extensive weight room. At Island Swimming, she would develop her skills training with elite Canadian swimmers and several Olympians including Julia Wilkinson, Blake Worsley, Hilary Caldwell, and 2008 Olympic bronze medalist Ryan Cochrane.

=== University of Victoria ===
While swimming for Victoria's Island Swimming Club she attended and swam for the University of Victoria, graduating in 2014. At UVic, Horner received a Bachelor of Commerce, majoring in Service Management and Entrepreneurship and studied at the Peter B. Gustavson School of Business. The University's Head Swimming Coach in 2009 was Dr. Peter Vizsolyi who would coach 10 Canadian Olympic swimmers during his long coaching tenure, though Stephanie received much of her training and technique development from Randy Bennett, the Island Swimming Head Coach. Several top University of Victoria swimmers and Olympians, including Hilary Caldwell and Ryan Cochran also swam with the Island Swimming Club at the Saanich Commonwealth Pool, which was affiliated with the University and was just two miles from the University's campus.

Swimming for U. Victoria at the 2011 Canadian Inter-University Sports Nationals (CIS) Swimming Championships in Calgary, Horner won her signature event the 200-meter butterfly with a time of 2:12.69, won the 400 Individual Medley, and was part of the winning 4x100 freestyle relay team that included Island Swim Club teammate and Olympian Hilary Caldwell. Swimming for the University of Victoria as a Senior, at the Canada West Championships in Calgary in January 2014, Horner won the 200-meter butterfly in 2:13.32, and won a bronze swimming as part of the 4x100-meter relay. Her times qualified her for the Canadian Inter-University Sports Nationals at the University of Toronto in February.

=== 2008-2016 Olympics ===
At 19 and just beginning her time at the University of Victoria, Horner competed for her native country at the 2008 Summer Olympics in Beijing, China, placing 17th in the Women's 200 metres Freestyle, 11th in the Women's 400 metres Freestyle, 10th in the Women's 4x200 metre freestyle Relay, and 20th in the Women's 200 metre butterfly.

Four years later, she represented Canada at the 2012 Summer Olympics in London, placing 21st in the Women's 400 metre Individual Medley with a time of 4:45.49, placing second in the second preliminary heat. Both parents and her two siblings attended.

In 2016, she was officially named to Canada's Olympic team for the 2016 Summer Olympics in the 10K open water swim event, where she placed 23rd with a time of 1:59.22.1 The event was held August 16, 2016 at the Southern end of Rio's Copacabana Beach.

=== International competition highlights ===
Horner made the 2011 Canadian World Championships team, qualifying in the 400-metre individual medley event at the 14th FINA World Championships in Shanghai, China, finishing 17 overall in the 400 Individual Medley.

In 2013, Horner qualified for her first World University Games where she swam to an 8th-place finish in the 200-m butterfly, one of her signature events.

Soon to specialize in open water swimming, at the 2015 World University Games, Stephanie qualified for her first open water event at the 2015 World University Games, earning a 10th-place finish in the 10-km race. At the same event, she also competed for Canada in the 1500-m freestyle.

In April 2017, Horner was named to Canada's 2017 World Aquatics Championships team in Budapest, Hungary.

Horner placed eighth at the August, 2018 Pan Pacific Championships in Tokyo in the 10-km open water race.

As part of the Canadian Olympic team, in 2020 Horner moved to Vancouver to train with Coach Brad Dingey after the High Performance Centre in Victoria, where she had previously been training, closed.

Horner has worked for the GEUSS clothing company and as a professional open water athlete when she competed as part of the FINA/HOSA 10K Marathon Swimming World Cup from 2015 to 2018 and when she won the 10K swim event at the well known Traversée internationale du lac St-Jean in 2016.

== Honours ==
In 2012 Horner was awarded the Queen Elizabeth II Diamond Jubilee Medal. In 2018, Horner was named Swimming Canada's Female Open Water Swimmer of the Year.
