= Chanelle Charron-Watson =

Canadian swimmer

Personal information
- Full name: Chanelle Charron-Watson
- Nationality: Canada
- Born: June 13, 1984 (age 42) Gatineau, Quebec
- Height: 1.75 m (5 ft 9 in)
- Weight: 56 kg (123 lb)

Sport
- Sport: Swimming
- Strokes: Freestyle
- Club: Rouge et Or Université Laval
- College team: Université Laval
Medal record
Women's swimming
Pan American Games
Silver medal – second place	2007 Rio de Janeiro	4x100 m freestyle
Silver medal – second place	2007 Rio de Janeiro	4x200 m freestyle
Silver medal – second place	2007 Rio de Janeiro	4x100 m medley
Summer Universiade
Bronze medal – third place	2005 Izmir	400 m freestyle

Chanelle Charron-Watson (born June 13, 1984 in Gatineau, Quebec) is a female swimmer from Canada, who took three silver relay medals at the 2007 Pan American Games in Rio de Janeiro, Brazil.
