= Teresa Crippen =

American swimmer (born 1990)

Personal information
- National team: United States
- Born: April 12, 1990 (age 36) Bryn Mawr, Pennsylvania, U.S.
- Height: 5 ft 10 in (1.78 m)

Sport
- Sport: Swimming
- Strokes: Medley, backstroke, butterfly
- Club: Germantown Academy
- College team: University of Florida
Medal record
Women's swimming
Representing the United States
Pan American Games
Gold medal – first place	2007 Rio	200 m backstroke
Gold medal – first place	2007 Rio	4x200 m freestyle
Silver medal – second place	2007 Rio	400 m medley
Pan Pacific Championships
Silver medal – second place	2010 Irvine	200 m butterfly

Teresa Crippen (born April 12, 1990) is an American competition swimmer who was a Pan American Games gold medalist.

Crippen was born in Bryn Mawr, Pennsylvania. She grew up in Conshohocken, Pennsylvania, and graduated from Germantown Academy in Fort Washington, Pennsylvania in 2008.

She accepted an athletic scholarship to attend the University of Florida in Gainesville, Florida, where she swam for coach Gregg Troy's Florida Gators swimming and diving team in National Collegiate Athletic Association (NCAA) competition from 2009 to 2012. During her four-year college career, she won two individual Southeastern Conference (SEC) championships in the 400-yard individual medley (2010) and the 200-yard backstroke (2011). She earned a total of seventeen All-American honors, including six as a senior in 2012.

At the 2007 Pan American Games in Rio de Janeiro, Crippen won the gold medal in the 200-meter backstroke and the silver in the 400-meter individual medley. She also won a gold by swimming in the prelims of the 4x200-meter At the 2010 US National Championships, the selection meet for both the 2010 Pan Pacific Swimming Championships and the 2011 World Aquatics Championships, Crippen placed second in the 200-meter butterfly and fifth in both the 400-meter individual medley and 200-meter backstroke.

Crippen won the silver medal at the 2010 Pan Pacific Championships in the 200-meter butterfly, placing second to former world-record holder Jessicah Schipper.

Teresa Crippen is the younger sister of swimmers Maddy, Fran and Claire Crippen.

== See also ==
- Florida Gators
- List of University of Florida alumni
