= Mathieu Bois =

Canadian swimmer (born 1988)

Personal information
- Full name: Mathieu Bois
- National team: Canada
- Born: July 6, 1988 (age 38) Longueuil, Quebec
- Height: 1.80 m (5 ft 11 in)
- Weight: 77 kg (170 lb)

Sport
- Sport: Swimming
- Strokes: Breaststroke
- Club: Piscines du Parc Olympique
Medal record
Men's swimming
Representing Canada
Pan American Games
| Bronze medal – third place | 2007 Rio | 100 m breaststroke |
| Bronze medal – third place | 2007 Rio | 4x100 m medley |

Mathieu Bois (born July 6, 1988) is a competition swimmer from Canada, who mostly competes in the breaststroke events. He claimed bronze medals in the men's 100-metre breaststroke, and the 4x100-metre medley relay, at the 2007 Pan American Games in Rio de Janeiro, Brazil. Bois made his Olympic debut at the 2008 Summer Olympics in Beijing, China.
