= United States at the 2007 Pan American Games =

- IOC code: USA
- NOC: United States Olympic Committee
- Website: teamusa.org

in Rio de Janeiro 13–29 July 2007
- Competitors: 595
- Flag bearer: Danielle Scott-Arruda
- Medals Ranked 1st: Gold 97 Silver 88 Bronze 52 Total 237

Pan American Games appearances (overview)
- 1951; 1955; 1959; 1963; 1967; 1971; 1975; 1979; 1983; 1987; 1991; 1995; 1999; 2003; 2007; 2011; 2015; 2019; 2023; 2027

The United States competed at the 15th Pan American Games in Rio de Janeiro. The U.S. delegation was formed of 595 athletes, and was the second largest delegation in the competition, right after the Brazilian delegation. The U.S. delegation included 322 men and 273 women.

== Medals ==
=== Gold ===
===== Archery =====
- Women's individual competition: Jennifer Nichols
- Men's team competition: Brady Ellison, Butch Johnson, Vic Wunderle

===== Athletics =====
- Men's 5,000 metres: Ed Moran
- Men's 3,000 metres steeplechase: Joshua McAdams
- Men's discus throw: Michael Robertson
- Women's 100 metres: Mikele Barber
- Women's 10,000 metres: Sara Slattery
- Women's 400 metres hurdles: Sheena Johnson

===== Badminton =====
- Women's singles competition: Eva Lee
- Women's doubles competition: Eva Lee, Mesinee Mangkalariki
- Mixed doubles competition: Eva Lee, Howard Bach

===== Basketball =====
- Women's team competition: United States women's national basketball team

===== Boxing =====
- Men's light flyweight (48 kg): Luis Yanez
- Men's light welterweight (64 kg): Karl Dargan

===== Diving =====
- Men's 3 m springboard synchronized: Troy Dumais, Mitch Richeson
- Men's 10 m platform synchronized: David Boudia, Thomas Finchum

===== Equestrian =====
- Men's individual dressage: Christopher Hickey
- Team dressage: US national team
- Women's individual eventing: Karen O'Connor
- Team eventing: US national team

===== Fencing =====
- Men's foil: Andras Horanyi
- Women's épée: Courtney Hurley
- Men's team sabre: Tim Hagamen, Benjamin Igoe, Benjamin (Benji) Ungar, James Williams

===== Judo =====
- Men's 73 kg: Ryan Reser
- Men's 81 kg: Travis Stevens
- Women's 70 kg: Ronda Rousey

===== Modern pentathlon =====
- Men's individual competition: Eli Bremer

===== Swimming =====
- Men's 200 m freestyle: Matthew Owen
- Men's 400 m freestyle: Matt Patton
- Men's 1500 m freestyle: Chip Peterson
- Men's 100 m backstroke: Randall Bal
- Men's 4 × 100 m medley: Randall Bal, Mark Gangloff, Ricky Berens, Andy Grant
- Men's 10 km open water: Fran Crippen
- Women's 200 m freestyle: Ava Ohlgren
- Women's 400 m freestyle: Jessica Rodriguez
- Women's 800 m freestyle: Caroline Burckle
- Women's 100 m backstroke: Julia Smit
- Women's 200 m backstroke: Teresa Crippen
- Women's 100 m breaststroke: Michelle McKeehan
- Women's 200 m breaststroke: Caitlin Leverenz
- Women's 100 m butterfly: Kathleen Hersey
- Women's 200 m butterfly: Kathleen Hersey
- Women's 200 m individual medley: Julia Smit
- Women's 400 m individual medley: Kathleen Hersey
- Women's 4 × 100 m freestyle: Julia Smit, Samantha Woodward, Emily Kukors, Maritza Correia
- Women's 4 × 200 m freestyle: Jessica Rodriguez, Ava Ohlgren, Emily Kukors, Katie Carroll
- Women's 4 × 100 m medley: Julia Smit, Michelle McKeehan, Kathleen Hersey, Maritza Correia
- Women's 10 km open water: Chloe Sutton

===== Synchronized swimming =====
- Women's duet: Christina Jones, Andrea Nott
- Women's team: US women's national team

===== Table tennis =====
- Women's singles competition: Gao Jun
- Women's team competition: US women's national team

===== Water polo =====
- Men's team competition: United States men's national water polo team
- Women's team competition: United States women's national water polo team

===== Wrestling =====
- Men's freestyle 55 kg: Henry Cejudo
- Men's Greco-Roman 66 kg: Harry Lester
- Men's Greco-Roman 84 kg: Brad Vering
- Men's Greco-Roman 96 kg: Justin Ruiz
- Women's freestyle 63 kg: Sara McMann
- Women's freestyle 72 kg: Kristie Marano

=== Silver ===
===== Badminton =====
- Men's doubles competition: Howard Bach, Bob Malaythong

===== Baseball =====
- Men's team competition: United States national baseball team

===== Boxing =====
- Men's welterweight (69 kg): Demetrius Andrade

===== Diving =====
- Women's 10 m platform: Haley Ishimatsu
- Women's 3 m springboard synchronized: Ariel Rittenhouse, Kelci Bryant

===== Fencing =====
- Men's sabre: James Williams
- Women's foil: Hanna Thompson
- Women's sabre: Alexis Jemal
- Women's team sabre: Emma Baratta, Eileen Grench, Alexis Jemal, Hanna Thompson

===== Football =====
- Women's team competition: United States women's national football team

===== Volleyball =====
- Men's team competition: United States men's national volleyball team

=== Bronze ===
===== Archery =====
- Men's individual competition: Vic Wunderle

===== Badminton =====
- Men's singles competition: Eric Go
- Women's doubles competition: Kuei Ya Chen, Jamie Subandhi
- Mixed doubles competition: Bob Maythong, Mesinee Mangkalakiri

===== Boxing =====
- Men's light heavyweight (81 kg): Christopher Downs

===== Diving =====
- Men's 3 m springboard: Troy Dumais
- Women's 3 m springboard: Kelci Bryant
- Women's 10 m platform synchronized: Haley Ishimatsu, Mary Beth Dunnichay

===== Fencing =====
- Women's sabre: Emma Baratta
- Men's team épée: Andras Horanyi, Weston Kelsey, Cody Mattern, Benjamin (Benji) Ungar

===== Volleyball =====
- Women's team competition: United States women's national volleyball team

== Results by event ==
=== Basketball ===
==== Men's team competition ====
- Team roster

- Joey Dorsey
- Wayne Ellington
- Shan Foster
- James Gist
- Roy Hibbert
- Maarty Leunen
- Derrick Low
- Eric Maynor
- Drew Neitzel
- Scottie Reynolds
- Kyle Weaver
- D.J. White

- Head coach: Jay Wright (Villanova University)

==== Women's team competition ====
- Team roster

- Mattee Ajavon
- Nicky Anosike
- Jayne Appel
- Marissa Coleman
- Emily Fox
- Alexis Hornbuckle
- Charde Houston
- Natasha Humphrey
- Erlana Larkins
- Angel McCoughtry
- Melanie Thomas
- Candice Wiggins

=== Football ===
==== Women's team competition ====
- Team roster

- Alyssa Naeher
- Brittany Taylor
- Nikki Washington
- Kaley Fountain
- Teresa Noyola
- Nikki Marshall
- Casey Nogueira
- Lauren Cheney
- Jessica McDonald
- Michelle Enyeart
- Tobin Heath
- Kylie Wright
- Lauren Barnes
- Gina Dimartino
- Becky Edwards
- Lauren Wilmoth
- Kelley O'Hara
- Chantel Jones

- Head coach: Jill Ellis

=== Swimming ===
Source:

=== Triathlon ===
==== Men's competition ====
- Andy Potts

- 1:52:31.51 — Gold medal

- Jarrod Shoemaker

- 1:52:32.74 — 6th place

- Brian Fleischmann

- 1:53:37.36 — 8th place

==== Women's competition ====
- Julie Ertel

- 1:57:23.21 — Gold medal

- Sarah Haskins

- 1:57:46.23 — Silver medal

- Sara McLarty

- 2:02:07.68 — 10th place

=== Volleyball ===
==== Men's team competition ====
- Team roster

- David Lee
- Sean Rooney
- James Polster (c)
- Brandon Taliaferro
- Richard Lambourne
- Andrew Hein
- Brook Billings
- Olree Pieter
- Kevin Hansen
- David McKienzie
- Delano Thomas
- Nils Nielsen

- Head coach: Hugh McCutcheon

==== Women's team competition ====
- Team roster

- Danielle Scott (c)
- Tayyiba Haneef
- Charnette Fair
- Kristen Michaelis
- Foluke Akinradewo
- Laura Tomes
- Cynthia Barboza
- Kimberly Hampton
- Maurelle Hampton
- Courtney Thompson
- Lindsey Hunter
- Cassie Busse

- Head coach: Susan Woodstra

=== Weightlifting ===
==== Men's competition ====
- Kendrick Farris
- Chad Vaughn
- Matt Bruce
- Casey Burgener
- Jeff Wittmer

==== Women's competition ====
- Natalie Woolfolk
- Melanie Roach
- Emmy Vargas
- Jackie Berube

== See also ==
- United States at the 2008 Summer Olympics
