= Elizabeth Wycliffe =

Canadian swimmer (born 1983)

Personal information
- Full name: Elizabeth Wycliffe
- Nickname: "Liz"
- Nationality: Canada
- Born: March 14, 1983 (age 43) Thousand Oaks, California, U.S.
- Height: 1.77 m (5 ft 10 in)
- Weight: 70 kg (150 lb)

Sport
- Sport: Swimming
- Strokes: Freestyle and backstroke
- Club: Longhorn Aquatics
- College team: Texas Longhorns
Medal record
Women's swimming
Pan American Games
Silver medal – second place	2007 Rio de Janeiro	4x100 m medley
Bronze medal – third place	2007 Rio de Janeiro	100m backstroke
Bronze medal – third place	2007 Rio de Janeiro	200m backstroke

Elizabeth Wycliffe (born March 14, 1983, in Thousand Oaks, California), sometimes known as Liz Wycliffe, is a female swimmer from Canada, who was born in the United States. She is a backstroke and freestyle specialist. A resident of Kingston, Ontario, she claimed three medals at the 2007 Pan American Games in Rio de Janeiro, Brazil.
