= Henrique Barbosa =

Brazilian swimmer

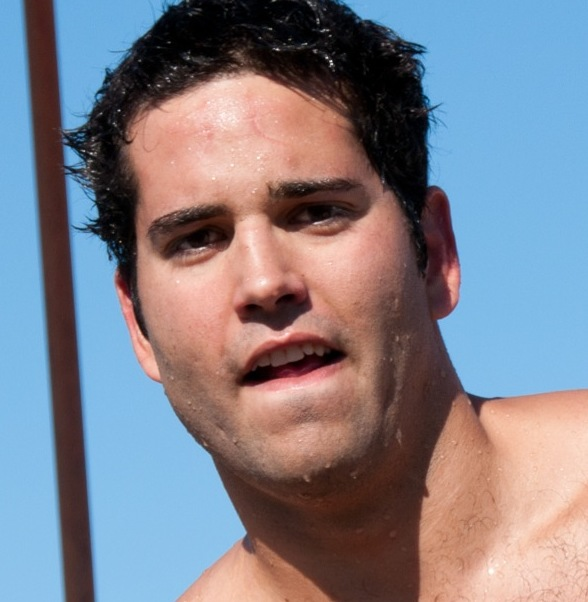

Personal information
- Full name: Henrique Ribeiro Marques Barbosa
- Nationality: Brazil
- Born: July 5, 1984 (age 42) Belo Horizonte, Minas Gerais, Brazil
- Height: 1.95 m (6 ft 5 in)
- Weight: 84 kg (185 lb)

Sport
- Sport: Swimming
- Strokes: Breaststroke
- Club: San Ramon Valley Aquatics (SRVA)
- College team: University of California Berkeley
- Coach: Nort Thornton (U Cal Berkeley); Richard Thornton (SRVA)
Medal record
Men's swimming
Representing Brazil
World Championships (SC)
Bronze medal – third place	2010 Dubai	4×100 m medley
Pan American Games
Silver medal – second place	2007 Rio	200 m breaststroke
Silver medal – second place	2007 Rio	4×100 m medley
South American Games
Gold medal – first place	2014 Santiago	200 m breaststroke

Henrique Ribeiro Marques Barbosa (born July 5, 1984) is a Brazilian-born international swimmer who swam for the University of California Berkeley under Hall of Fame Coach Nort Thornton, and competed for Brazil in breaststroke in both the 2008 and 2012 Summer Olympics.

== Early years ==
Barbosa was born on July 5, 1984 to Ronaldo and Margaret Barbosa, and grew up in Belo Horizonte, Minos Gerais, Brazil.

At eight, he practiced judo and volleyball, initially, but began to devote himself exclusively to swimming by age twelve. At fifteen, he won his first championship, capturing the Brazil Trophy.

=== California High School years ===
Moving to the United States around 2000 at the age of sixteen, he would attend and graduate San Ramon's California High School. During his high school years, he won a national title at the 2002 U.S. National Spring Championships in the 100-meter breast with a notable age group time of 1:03.55. During his Junior and Senior years in high school from 2001-2, he swam for coach Richard Thornton, son of Cal head coach Nort Thornton, at San Ramon Valley Aquatics. He was also coached by Rick Millington, head coach of the Walnut Creek Aquabears Swim Club.

=== Swimming for U. Cal Berkeley ===
Barbosa earned a degree in International relations from the University of California, Berkeley, and swam for the university under the direction of Hall of Fame Coach Nort Thornton from around 2002-2005, having received an athletic scholarship. As a Junior at Cal in 2004-5, at the NCAA Championships, he earned All-America honors in individual events, taking a fifth with a time of 53.45 in the 100 and seventh with a time of 1:56.97 in the 200 breaststrokes. He also earned All-American honors for swimming the breaststroke portion of U of California's first place 200 medley relay

== International career ==
At 18, while swimming at the 2002 Pan Pacific Swimming Championships in Yokohama, Barbosa finished 5th in the 4×100-metre medley, 9th in the 100-metre breaststroke, and 12th in the 200-metre breaststroke.

In the 2003 World Aquatics Championships in Barcelona, he finished 35th in the 100-metre breaststroke. He participated at the 2003 Pan American Games, in Santo Domingo, where he finished 5th in the 100-metre breaststroke.

=== 2004 FINA World Championships ===
At the 2004 FINA World Swimming Championships (25 m), in Indianapolis, Barbosa finished 7th in the 100-metre breaststroke final, 14th in the 50-metre breaststroke, 16th in the 200-metre breaststroke, and helped the Brazilian 4×100-metre medley relay team to reach the finals.

Competing at the 2006 Pan Pacific Swimming Championships in Victoria, he finished 7th in the 4×100-metre medley, 8th in the 100-metre breaststroke, and 12th in the 200-metre breaststroke.

At the 2007 World Aquatics Championships, in Melbourne, he finished 25th in the 50-metre breaststroke, 23rd in the 100-metre breaststroke, 33rd in the 200-metre breaststroke and 9th in the 4×100-metre medley. At the 2007 Pan American Games, in Rio de Janeiro, Barbosa won two silver medals in the 200-metre breaststroke, and in the 4×100-metre medley, where he broke the South American record with a time of 3:35.81, along with Thiago Pereira, Kaio Almeida and César Cielo. He also finished 4th in the 100-metre breaststroke. In the 100-metre breaststroke semifinal, Henrique broke the South American record, with a time of 1:01.47.

In 2008, Barbosa was living in Florida, dedicated solely to swimming. He shared a house with three other swimmers, as a member of "The Race Club", an elite swim club created by American Olympic champion Gary Hall Jr.

=== 2008 Olympics ===
As a competitor at the 2008 Summer Olympics, he finished 23rd in the 100-metre breaststroke, and 30th in the 200-metre breaststroke.

On May 6, 2009, at the Maria Lenk Aquatic Center, Barbosa swam the 2nd best time in the history of the 200-metre breaststroke: 2:08.44. On May 9, 2009, he swam the 2nd fastest time in history in the 100-metre breaststroke, 59.12 seconds, lowering the time in the end of the next day to 59.03 seconds. Both world records belonged to Kosuke Kitajima (58.91 seconds in the 100-metre, and 2:07.51 in the 200-metre breaststroke).

Swimming at the 2009 World Aquatics Championships, in Rome, he finished 8th in the 100-metre breaststroke, 7th in the 200-metre breaststroke, and 4th place in the 4×100-metre medley with the Brazilian team, in a spectacular race where the top four relay teams broke the world record of the United States from Beijing 2008.

On November 14, 2009, at the FINA World Cup, Barbosa broke the short-course South American record in the 200-metre breaststroke, with a time of 2:04.35.

Swimming at the 2010 Pan Pacific Swimming Championships in Irvine, he finished 8th in the 200-metre breaststroke, classified 14th in the 100-metre breaststroke, but did not swim the final. He swam 13th in the 50-metre breaststroke.

At the 2010 FINA World Swimming Championships (25 m), in Dubai, he won a bronze medal in the 4×100-metre medley. He was disqualified, however, in 100-metre breaststroke heats.

In 2011, Barbosa was one of four swimmers from Brazil caught in doping test by the use of the banned substance furosemide. The Court of Arbitration for Sport (CAS) found that Barbosa was not guilty in the case and decided to just keep the warning already stipulated by the CBDA (Brazilian Aquatic Sports Confederation).

=== 2012 Olympics ===
At the 2012 Summer Olympics, he competed in the Men's 200-metre breaststroke, finishing in 19th place overall in the heats, failing to qualify for the semifinals.
