= Scott Dickens =

Canadian swimmer (born 1984)

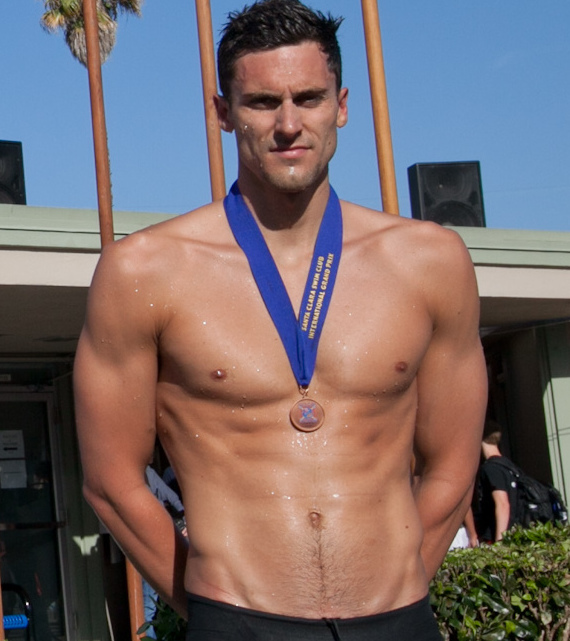

Personal information
- Full name: Andrew Scott Dickens
- Nickname: "Scotty"
- National team: Canada
- Born: August 4, 1984 (age 41) Burlington, Ontario
- Height: 1.95 m (6 ft 5 in)
- Weight: 83 kg (183 lb)

Sport
- Sport: Swimming
- Strokes: Breaststroke
- Club: Pacific Dolphins
- College team: University of British Columbia
Medal record
Men's swimming
Representing Canada
Pan American Games
Gold medal – first place	2007 Rio de Janeiro	100 m breaststroke
Bronze medal – third place	2003 Santo Domingo	4x200 m freestyle
Bronze medal – third place	2003 Santo Domingo	4x100 m medley
Bronze medal – third place	2007 Rio de Janeiro	4x100 m medley
Summer Universiade
Silver medal – second place	2005 Izmir	50 m breaststroke
Pan Pacific Championships
Bronze medal – third place	2010 Irvine	50 m breaststroke

Andrew Scott Dickens (born August 4, 1984) is a former competitive swimmer from Canada, who mostly competes in the breaststroke events. He claimed two medals at the 2007 Pan American Games in Rio de Janeiro, Brazil. Dickens won his first national title at the 2004 Canadian Olympic Trials, earning his first trip to the Olympic Games where he finished 19th in the 100-metre breaststroke.

Dickens finished 8th in the semifinal heat and 16th overall in the 100-metre breaststroke at the 2012 Summer Olympics in London. Dickens was feeling sick during his semifinal race, with a running nose the morning of the race. He also finished in 16th in the 200-metre breaststroke, and was part of the Canadian team that finishing in 8th place in the men's 4 x 100 medley relay.

On October 23, 2013, Dickens announced he was retiring from swimming after ten years with the national team.
