= Bahamas at the 2027 Pan American Games =

- IOC code: BAH
- NOC: Bahamas Olympic Association

in Lima, Peru 2027 – 2027
- Competitors: 3 in 3 sports
- Medals: Gold 0 Silver 0 Bronze 0 Total 0

Pan American Games appearances (overview)
- 1955; 1959; 1963; 1967; 1971; 1975; 1979; 1983; 1987; 1991; 1995; 1999; 2003; 2007; 2011; 2015; 2019; 2023

The Bahamas is scheduled to compete at the 2027 Pan American Games in Lima, Peru from July 23 to August 8, 2027. This will be Bahamas's 19th appearance at the Pan American Games, having competed at every edition of the Games since the second edition in 1955.

== Competitors ==
The following is the list of number of competitors (per gender) participating at the games per sport/discipline.

Sport	Men	Women	Total
Equestrian			1
Sailing	0	1	1
Wrestling	1	0	1
Total	1	1	3

== Equestrian ==
The Bahamas qualified one equestrian in Jumping at the 2026 Central American and Caribbean Games.

=== Jumping ===
Athlete	Horse	Event	Qualification											Final							
Athlete	Horse	Event	Round 1			Round 2.1			Round 2.2			Total		Round A			Round B			Total	
Athlete	Horse	Event	Faults	Result Time	Rank	Faults	Result Time	Rank	Faults	Result Time	Rank	Faults	Rank	Faults	Result Time	Rank	Faults	Result Time	Rank	Faults	Rank
		Individual																			

== Sailing ==
The Bahamas qualified 1 boat for a total of 1 sailor after winning the event at the 2025 Junior Pan American Games.

Athlete	Event	Opening series																		Finals				
Athlete	Event	1	2	3	4	5	6	7	8	9	10	11	12	13	14	15	16	Points	Rank	QF	SF	M / F	Points	Rank
Eliza Denning	ILCA 6											—N/a								—N/a				

== Wrestling ==
The Bahamas qualified a male wrestler through the 2026 Pan American Wrestling Championships.

Key:

- VT – Victory by fall.
- PP – Decision by points – the loser with technical points.
- PO – Decision by points – the loser without technical points.
- SP – Technical superiority – the loser with technical points and a margin of victory of at least 9 (Greco-Roman) or 10 (freestyle) points.
- ST – Great superiority – the loser without technical points and a margin of victory of at least 8 (Greco-Roman) or 10 (freestyle) points.
- VA – Decision by withdrawal

Men

Athlete	Event	Round of 16	Quarterfinal	Semifinal	Repechage	Final / BM	
Athlete	Event	Opposition Result	Opposition Result	Opposition Result	Opposition Result	Opposition Result	Rank
	Freestyle 65 kg	Bye					
