= Bahamas at the 2023 Pan American Games =

- IOC code: BAH
- NOC: Bahamas Olympic Committee

in Santiago, Chile 20 October 2023 – 5 November 2023
- Competitors: 20 in 6 sports
- Flag bearers (opening): Lamar Taylor & Zaylie-Elizabeth Thompson
- Flag bearer (closing): Joshua Higgins
- Medals Ranked =25th: Gold 0 Silver 1 Bronze 2 Total 3

Pan American Games appearances (overview)
- 1955; 1959; 1963; 1967; 1971; 1975; 1979; 1983; 1987; 1991; 1995; 1999; 2003; 2007; 2011; 2015; 2019; 2023

The Bahamas is scheduled to compete at the 2023 Pan American Games in Santiago, Chile from October 20 to November 5, 2023. This will be The Bahamas's 18th appearance at the Pan American Games, having competed at every edition of the Games since the second edition in 1955.

The Bahamian delegation consisted of 20 athletes competing in six sports. Swimmers Lamar Taylor and Zaylie-Elizabeth Thompson were the country's flagbearers during the opening ceremony. Meanwhile, sailor Joshua Higgins was the country's flagbearer during the closing ceremony.

The Bahamas won three medals at the games, one silver and two bronze, to finish in a tie for 25th in the medal table (along with Haiti and Guyana).

== Competitors ==
The following is the list of number of competitors (per gender) participating at the games per sport/discipline.

Sport	Men	Women	Total
Athletics (track and field)	4	1	5
Golf	1	0	1
Sailing	1	0	1
Swimming	5	4	9
Tennis	2	1	3
Wrestling	1	0	1
Total	14	6	20

== Medallists ==
The following Bahamian competitors won medals at the games. In the discipline sections below, the medalists' names are bolded.

Medal	Name	Sport	Event	Date
Silver	Rhema Otabor	Athletics	Women's javelin throw	November 3
Bronze	Lamar Taylor	Swimming	Men's 50 metre freestyle	October 24
Bronze	Donald Thomas	Athletics	Men's high jump	November 3

== Athletics (track and field) ==
Key

- Note–Ranks given for track events are within the athlete's heat only
- **Q** = Qualified for the next round
- **q** = Qualified for the next round as a fastest loser
- * = Athlete ran in the heat but not the final
- Bye = Athlete not required to compete in round

Men
Track & road events

Athlete	Event	Semifinal		Final	
Athlete	Event	Time	Rank	Time	Rank
Samson Colebrooke	100 m	10.62	19	Did not advance	

Field events

Athlete	Event	Result	Rank
**Donald Thomas**	High jump	2.24	3rd place, bronze medalist(s)

Combined events – Decathlon

Athlete	Event	100 m	LJ	SP	HJ	400 m	110H	DT	PV	JT	1500 m	Total	Rank
Ken Mullings	Result	10.89	6.90	14.57	2.01	50.67	14.27	41.64	NM	DNS	Did not finish		
Kendrick Thompson	Result	Did not start											

Women

Field events

Athlete	Event	Result	Rank
**Rhema Otabor**	Javelin throw	60.54	2nd place, silver medalist(s)

== Golf ==
Bahamas qualified a male golfer.

Athlete	Event	Round 1	Round 2	Round 3	Round 4	Total		
Athlete	Event	Score	Score	Score	Score	Score	Par	Rank
Richard Gibson	Men's individual	77	72	73	75	297	+9	=27

== Sailing ==
Bahamas received one reallocated spot in the men's laser event.

Men

Athlete	Event	Opening series																		Finals				
Athlete	Event	1	2	3	4	5	6	7	8	9	10	11	12	13	14	15	16	Points	Rank	QF	SF	M / F	Points	Rank
Joshua Higgins	Laser	17	15	17	19	19	20	(23); DSQ	15	17	15	—N/a						154	17	—N/a		Did not advance		

== Swimming ==
The Bahamas qualified nine swimmers, five men and four women. Lamar Taylor was the only swimmer to win a medal for the Bahamas, a bronze in the men's 50 metre freestyle. Taylor broke the national record in the event on route to winning the medal.

Key

- Note – Ranks given are for the entire round
- **NR** – National record
- **FA** – Qualified for Final A
- **FB** – Qualified for Final B

Men

Athlete	Event	Heat		Final	
Athlete	Event	Time	Rank	Time	Rank
Jack Barr	800 m freestyle	—N/a		9:03.54	22
Jack Barr	1500 m freestyle	—N/a		17:38.10	18
Emmanuel Gadson	100 m butterfly	56.32	20	Did not advance	
Emmanuel Gadson	200 m breaststroke	2:21.56	18 **FB**	2:21.35	16
Emmanuel Gadson	200 m individual medley	2:15.56	24	Did not advance	
**Lamar Taylor**	50 m freestyle	22.48	7 **FA**	22.13 **NR**	3rd place, bronze medalist(s)
**Lamar Taylor**	100 m freestyle	50.95	16	DNS	
**Lamar Taylor**	100 m backstroke	56.39 **NR**	=13	DNS	
Luke Thompson	200 m freestyle	1:58.70	22	Did not advance	
Luke Thompson	400 m freestyle	4:11.61	21	Did not advance	
Mark-Anthony Thompson	100 m breaststroke	1:07.18	24	Did not advance	
Jack Barr; Lamar Taylor; Luke Thompson; Mark-Anthony Thompson	4 × 100 m freestyle relay	3:34.12	9	Did not advance	
Emmanuel Gadson; Lamar Taylor; Luke Thompson; Mark-Anthony Thompson	4 × 100 m medley relay	3:53.92	10	Did not advance	

Women

Athlete	Event	Heat		Final	
Athlete	Event	Time	Rank	Time	Rank
Victoria Russell	50 m freestyle	27.54	29	Did not advance	
Zaylie Thompson	100 m freestyle	59.34	29	Did not advance	
Zaylie Thompson	200 m freestyle	DNS		Did not advance	
Zaylie Thompson	100 m breaststroke	1:16.75	21	Did not advance	
Zaylie Thompson	200 m individual medley	2:30.53	23	Did not advance	
Katelyn Cabral; Victoria Russell; Zaylie Thompson; Ariel Weech	4 × 100 m freestyle relay	4:08.84	13	Did not advance	
Katelyn Cabral; Victoria Russell; Zaylie Thompson; Ariel Weech	4 × 100 m medley relay	4:34.03	13	Did not advance	

Mixed

Athlete	Event	Heat		Final	
Athlete	Event	Time	Rank	Time	Rank
Lamar Taylor; Luke Thompson; Katelyn Cabral; Zaylie Thompson	4 × 100 m freestyle relay	3:44.94	11	Did not advance	
Emmanuel Gadson; Mark-Anthony Thompson; Katelyn Cabral; Ariel Weech	4 × 100 m medley relay	4:12.80	11	Did not advance	

== Tennis ==
The Bahamas qualified three tennis players (two men and one woman).

Athlete	Event	Round of 64	Round of 32	Round of 16	Quarterfinals	Semifinals	Final / BM	
Athlete	Event	Opposition Score	Opposition Score	Opposition Score	Opposition Score	Opposition Score	Opposition Score	Rank
Kevin Major Jr.	Men's singles	Rubio (MEX); **L** 0–2 (3–6, 0–6)	Did not advance					
Justin Roberts	Men's singles	Bye	Vallejo (PAR); **L** 0–2 (1–6, 3–6)	Did not advance				
Sydney Clarke	Women's singles	Bye	Loeb (USA); **L** 0–2 (3–6, 0–6)	Did not advance				
Justin Roberts; Sydney Clarke	Mixed doubles	—N/a		Vergara / Britez (PAR); **L** 0–2 (4–6, 2–6)	Did not advance			

== Wrestling ==
The Bahamas received one wildcard for the men's freestyle 86 kg event. Rashji Mackey lost both of his matches and did not advance to the medal round.

Men

Athlete	Event	Round of 16	Quarterfinal	Semifinal	Repechage	Final / BM	
Athlete	Event	Opposition Result	Opposition Result	Opposition Result	Opposition Result	Opposition Result	Rank
Rashji Mackey	Freestyle 86 kg	Bye	Torreblanca (CUB); **L** 0–10 (VSU)	Did not advance	Izquierdo (COL); **L** 0–4 (VFA)	Did not advance	

== See also ==
- Bahamas at the 2024 Summer Olympics
