= Swimming at the 2023 Pan American Games – Men's 50 metre freestyle =

Men's 50 metre freestyle at the 2023 Pan American Games
- Venue: Aquatic Centre
- Date: October 24, 2023
- Competitors: 34 from 25 nations

Medalists
Gold medal	David Curtiss	United States
Silver medal	Jonny Kulow	United States
Bronze medal	Lamar Taylor	Bahamas

The men's 50 metre freestyle competition of the swimming events at the 2023 Pan American Games were held on October 24, 2023, at the Aquatic Center in Santiago, Chile.

== Records ==
Prior to this competition, the existing world and Pan American Games records were as follows:

World record	César Cielo Filho (BRA)	20.91	São Paulo, Brazil	December 18, 2009
Pan American Games record	César Cielo Filho (BRA)	21.58	Guadalajara, Mexico	October 20, 2011

== Results ==
KEY:	QA	Qualified for A final	QB	Qualified for B final	GR	Games record	NR	National record	PB	Personal best	SB	Seasonal best	WD	Withdrew

=== Heats ===
The first round was held on October 24.

Rank	Heat	Lane	Name	Nationality	Time	Notes
1	4	4	Jonny Kulow	United States	21.90	QA
2	5	4	David Curtiss	United States	22.10	QA
3	4	5	Alberto Mestre	Venezuela	22.20	QA
4	5	2	Gabriel Castaño	Mexico	22.38	QA
5	5	3	Victor Alcará	Brazil	22.46	QA
6	5	5	Guilherme Caribé	Brazil	22.47	QA
7	4	6	Lamar Taylor	Bahamas	22.48	QA
8	3	4	Marcelo Chierighini	Brazil	22.57	WD
9	4	3	Guido Buscaglia	Argentina	22.58	QA
10	3	3	Diego Mas Fraiz	Venezuela	22.64	QB
11	3	5	Mikel Schreuders	Aruba	22.69	QB
12	5	6	Edouard Fullum-Huot	Canada	22.78	QB
13	3	6	Nikoli Blackman	Trinidad and Tobago	22.84	QB
14	3	2	Stephen Calkins	Canada	22.85	QB
15	4	2	Jorge Iga	Mexico	23.00	WD
16	5	7	Matias Santiso	Argentina	23.02	QB
17	4	7	Mariano Lazzerini	Chile	23.13	QB
18	4	1	Leo Nolles	Uruguay	23.17	QB
19	3	1	Jeancarlo Calderón	Panama	23.32	
20	2	4	Jack Kirby	Barbados	23.48	
21	5	8	Ben Hockin	Paraguay	23.58	
22	4	8	Gabriel Martinez	Honduras	23.59	
23	2	2	Nixon Hernández	El Salvador	23.90	
24	2	5	James Allison	Cayman Islands	24.00	
25	3	7	Elías Ardiles	Chile	24.14	
26	3	8	Sidrell Williams	Jamaica	24.17	
27	2	3	Irvin Hoost	Suriname	24.18	
28	2	7	Guido Montero	Costa Rica	24.31	
29	2	1	Miguel Vásquez	Independent Athletes Team	24.34	
30	1	4	Nector Segovia	El Salvador	24.45	
31	2	6	Adriel Sanes	Virgin Islands	24.54	
32	1	5	Zackary Gresham	Grenada	24.89	
33	1	3	Nikolas Sylvester	Saint Vincent and the Grenadines	26.03	
—	5	1	Stefano Mitchell	Antigua and Barbuda	DNS	

=== Final B ===
The B final was also held on October 24.

Rank	Lane	Name	Nationality	Time	Notes
9	3	Edouard Fullum-Huot	Canada	22.45	
10	5	Mikel Schreuders	Aruba	22.58	
11	4	Diego Mas Fraiz	Venezuela	22.59	
12	6	Nikoli Blackman	Trinidad and Tobago	22.73	
13	2	Stephen Calkins	Canada	22.96	
14	7	Matias Santiso	Argentina	22.97	
15	1	Mariano Lazzerini	Chile	23.06	
16	8	Leo Nolles	Uruguay	23.40	

=== Final A ===
The A final was also held on October 24.

Rank	Lane	Name	Nationality	Time	Notes
1st place, gold medalist(s)	5	David Curtiss	United States	21.85	
2nd place, silver medalist(s)	4	Jonny Kulow	United States	21.90	
3rd place, bronze medalist(s)	1	Lamar Taylor	Bahamas	22.13	
4	3	Alberto Mestre	Venezuela	22.16	
5	6	Gabriel Castaño	Mexico	22.27	
5	7	Guilherme Caribé	Brazil	22.27	
7	8	Guido Buscaglia	Argentina	22.39	
7	2	Victor Alcará	Brazil	22.39	
