= Swimming at the 2023 Pan American Games – Men's 800 metre freestyle =

Men's 800 metre freestyle at the 2023 Pan American Games
- Venue: Aquatic Center
- Date: October 23, 2023
- Competitors: 22 from 16 nations

Medalists
Gold medal	Guilherme Costa	Brazil
Silver medal	Alfonso Mestre	Venezuela
Bronze medal	Will Gallant	United States

The men's 800 metre freestyle competition of the swimming events at the 2023 Pan American Games were held on October 23, 2023, at the Aquatic Center in Santiago, Chile.

== Records ==
Prior to this competition, the existing world and Pan American Games records were as follows:

World record	Zhang Lin (CHN)	7:32.12	Rome, Italy	July 29, 2009
Pan American Games record	Andrew Abruzzo (USA)	7:54.70	Lima, Peru	August 8, 2019

The following record was established during the competition:

Date	Event	Swimmer	Nation	Time	Record
October 23	Final	Guilherme Costa	Brazil	7:53.01	GR

== Results ==
KEY:	GR	Games record	NR	National record	PB	Personal best	SB	Seasonal best

=== Final ===
The final round was held on October 23 and divided into three different races.

Rank	Race	Lane	Name	Nationality	Time	Notes
1st place, gold medalist(s)	3	4	Guilherme Costa	Brazil	7:53.01	GR
2nd place, silver medalist(s)	3	5	Alfonso Mestre	Venezuela	7:54.46	
3rd place, bronze medalist(s)	3	3	Will Gallant	United States	7:58.96	
4	3	6	Thiago Maturana	Brazil	8:00.01	
5	3	6	Juan Morales	Colombia	8:05.49	
6	3	1	Alexander Axon	Canada	8:09.35	
7	2	4	Dylan Porges	Mexico	8:09.87	
8	3	2	James Plage	United States	8:10.73	
9	2	3	Eduardo Cisternas	Chile	8:11.13	
10	2	5	Ivo Cassini	Argentina	8:12.32	
11	3	8	Lucas Alba	Argentina	8:15.72	
12	2	8	Diego Dulieu	Honduras	8:16.48	
13	2	6	Adam Wu	Canada	8:18.09	
14	2	2	Sebastián Camacho	Colombia	8:18.44	
15	2	7	Jose Cano	Mexico	8:18.80	
16	1	5	Rodolfo Falcón	Cuba	8:19.66	
17	1	4	Christian Bayo	Puerto Rico	8:20.52	
18	2	1	Rafael Ponce	Peru	8:24.08	
19	1	3	Raekwon Noel	Guyana	8:34.68	
20	1	6	Alberto Vega	Costa Rica	8:37.10	
21	1	2	Diego Alvarado	El Salvador	9:01.73	
22	1	7	Jack Barr	Bahamas	9:03.54	
