= Annie Chandler =

Annie Chandler may refer to:

- Annie Lavery, a fictional character on ABC's daytime drama All My Children
- Annie Chandler (swimmer) (born 1987), American swimmer
