= Bahamas at the 1999 Pan American Games =

- IOC code: BAH
- NOC: Bahamas Olympic Association

in Winnipeg 23 July – 8 August 1999
- Medals Ranked 11th: Gold 2 Silver 0 Bronze 1 Total 3

Pan American Games appearances (overview)
- 1955; 1959; 1963; 1967; 1971; 1975; 1979; 1983; 1987; 1991; 1995; 1999; 2003; 2007; 2011; 2015; 2019; 2023; 2027

The 13th Pan American Games were held in Winnipeg, Manitoba, Canada from July 23 to August 8, 1999.

== Medals ==
=== Gold ===
===== Athletics =====
- Women's 100 metres: Chandra Sturrup
- Women's 200 metres: Debbie Ferguson

=== Bronze ===
===== Athletics =====
- Women's Javelin: Laverne Eve

== See also ==
- Bahamas at the 2000 Summer Olympics
