= Swimming at the 2023 Pan American Games – Men's 200 metre freestyle =

Men's 200 metre freestyle at the 2023 Pan American Games
- Venue: Aquatic Center
- Date: October 22, 2023
- Competitors: 24 from 19 nations

Medalists
Gold medal	Coby Carrozza	United States
Silver medal	Jorge Iga	Mexico
Bronze medal	Murilo Sartori	Brazil

The men's 400 metre freestyle competition of the swimming events at the 2023 Pan American Games were held on October 22, 2023, at the Aquatic Center in Santiago, Chile.

== Records ==
Prior to this competition, the existing world and Pan American Games records were as follows:

World record	Paul Biedermann (GER)	1:42.00	Rome, Italy	July 28, 2009
Pan American Games record	João de Lucca (BRA)	1:46.42	Toronto, Canada	July 15, 2015

== Results ==
KEY:	QA	Qualified for A final	QB	Qualified for B final	GR	Games record	NR	National record	PB	Personal best	SB	Seasonal best	WD	Withdrew

=== Heats ===
The first round was held on October 22.

Rank	Heat	Lane	Name	Nationality	Time	Notes
1	2	3	Breno Correia	Brazil	1:47.59	QA
2	2	4	Murilo Sartori	Brazil	1:47.63	QA
3	3	4	Fernando Scheffer	Brazil	1:48.03	QB
4	2	5	Zane Grothe	United States	1:48.17	QA
5	1	4	Coby Carrozza	United States	1:49.10	QA
6	1	5	Alfonso Mestre	Venezuela	1:49.33	QA
7	3	5	Jorge Iga	Mexico	1:49.51	QA
8	1	3	Jeremy Bagshaw	Canada	1:49.74	QA
9	3	3	Javier Acevedo	Canada	1:50.28	WD
10	1	6	Santiago Corredor	Colombia	1:50.49	QA
11	2	6	Héctor Ruvalcaba	Mexico	1:50.52	QB
12	3	6	Joaquín Vargas	Peru	1:51.18	QB
13	3	2	Nikoli Blackman	Trinidad and Tobago	1:51.88	QB
14	2	7	Noah Mascoll-Gomes	Antigua and Barbuda	1:55.42	QB
15	2	2	James Allison	Cayman Islands	1:55.45	QB
16	3	1	Isaac Beitia	Panama	1:55.68	QB
17	1	2	Gabriel Martinez	Honduras	1:55.69	QB
18	1	1	Christopher Gossmann	Independent Athletes Team	1:55.87	
19	3	7	Alberto Vega	Costa Rica	1:56.27	
20	3	8	Gabriel Araya	Chile	1:57.19	
21	2	1	Sam Williamson	Bermuda	1:57.37	
22	2	8	Luke Thompson	Bahamas	1:58.70	
23	1	8	Diego Aranda	Uruguay	2:01.53	
24	1	7	Jose Campo	El Salvador	2:03.46	

=== Final B ===
The B final was also held on October 22.

Rank	Lane	Name	Nationality	Time	Notes
9	3	Joaquín Vargas	Peru	1:50.75	
10	4	Fernando Scheffer	Brazil	1:51.21	
11	5	Héctor Ruvalcaba	Mexico	1:51.39	
12	6	Nikoli Blackman	Trinidad and Tobago	1:52.92	
13	7	James Allison	Cayman Islands	1:53.19	
14	2	Noah Mascoll-Gomes	Antigua and Barbuda	1:54.69	
15	1	Isaac Beitia	Panama	1:56.17	
16	8	Gabriel Martinez	Honduras	1:56.36	

=== Final A ===
The A final was also held on October 22.

Rank	Lane	Name	Nationality	Time	Notes
1st place, gold medalist(s)	6	Coby Carrozza	United States	1:47.37	
2nd place, silver medalist(s)	7	Jorge Iga	Mexico	1:47.56	
3rd place, bronze medalist(s)	5	Murilo Sartori	Brazil	1:47.95	
4	3	Zane Grothe	United States	1:48.00	
5	4	Breno Correia	Brazil	1:48.22	
6	2	Alfonso Mestre	Venezuela	1:49.29	
7	1	Jeremy Bagshaw	Canada	1:49.66	
8	8	Santiago Corredor	Colombia	1:50.10	
