= Coby Carrozza =

American swimmer (born 2001)

Personal information
- Nationality: United States
- Born: May 7, 2001 (age 25) Austin, Texas, U.S.

Sport
- Sport: Swimming
- Strokes: Freestyle
- Club: Texas Longhorns
- College team: University of Texas at Austin
Medal record
World Championships (LC)
Gold medal – first place	2022 Budapest	4×200 m freestyle
Pan American Games
Gold medal – first place	2023 Santiago	200 m freestyle
Gold medal – first place	2023 Santiago	4×100 m medley
Silver medal – second place	2023 Santiago	4×100 m freestyle
Silver medal – second place	2023 Santiago	4×200 m freestyle

Coby Carrozza (born May 7, 2001) is an American swimmer for the University of Texas Longhorns men's swimming team. He is currently scheduled to swim the 2022 World Aquatics Championships in the men's 4 × 200 m free relay for the United States of America team for Worlds.

== Career ==
=== 2019 ===
On January 27, 2019, Carrozza would announce his commitment to the University of Texas.

=== 2022 ===
At Trials, Carrozza managed to qualify for the men's 200m freestyle, earning the 18th seed in the event. In it, he would manage a fifth-place finish, earning a spot on the United States' relay team for the 4 × 200 m relay team.

=== 2023 ===
At the 2023 Pan American Games he wins four medals, two of gold and two of silver.

== Personal life ==
Carrozza has two older siblings; Quinn, his sister, and Crayton, his brother. Carrozza's father, Paul, was the head track and swimming coach at St. Stephen's Episcopal School, the high school Carrozza graduated from in 2019.
