= Swimming at the 2023 Pan American Games – Men's 4 × 100 metre freestyle relay =

Men's 4 ×100 metre freestyle relay at the 2023 Pan American Games
- Venue: Aquatic Center
- Dates: October 21 (Final)
- Competitors: 45 from 9 nations
- Winning time: 3:13.51

Medalists
Gold medal	Guilherme Caribé; Marcelo Chierighini; Victor Alcará; Felipe Ribeiro de Souza; Breno Correia	Brazil
Silver medal	Jonathan Kulow; Adam Chaney; Jack Aikins; Brooks Curry; Coby Carrozza; Lukas Davin Miller	United States
Bronze medal	Javier Acevedo; Edouard Fullum-Huot; Stephen Calkins; Finlay Knox; Blake Tierney; Jeremy Bagshaw	Canada

The men's 4 × 100 metre freestyle relay competition of the swimming events at the 2023 Pan American Games were held on October 21, 2023, at the Aquatic Center in Santiago.

== Records ==
Prior to this competition, the existing world and Pan American Games records were as follows:

World record	United States (USA); Michael Phelps (47.51); Garrett Weber-Gale (47.02); Cullen Jones (47.65); Jason Lezak (46.06)	3:08.24	Beijing, China	August 11, 2008
Pan American Games record	Brazil (BRA); Breno Correia (48.82); Marcelo Chierighini (47.45); Bruno Fratus (48.18); Pedro Spajari (48.16)	3:12.61	Lima, Peru	August 6, 2019

== Results ==
KEY:	Q	Qualified	GR	Games record	NR	National record	PB	Personal best	SB	Seasonal best

=== Heats ===
The first round was held on October 21.

Rank	Heat	Lane	Nation	Swimmers	Time	Notes
1	2	5	Brazil	Victor Alcará (49.79); Guilherme Caribé (49.01); Felipe Ribeiro de Souza (49.05); Breno Correia (48.30)	3:16.15	Q
2	2	4	United States	Coby Carrozza (49.80); Jack Aikins (48.95); Lukas Davin Miller (48.98); Adam Chaney (48.84)	3:16.57	Q
3	1	4	Canada	Stephen Calkins (49.95); Finlay Knox (49.21); Blake Tierney (50.19); Jeremy Bagshaw (50.98)	3:20.33	Q
4	2	3	Mexico	Gabriel Castaño (50.34); Ángel Martínez (50.26); Sebastian Camacho (50.89); Andres Dupont (50.58)	3:22.07	Q
5	2	6	Colombia	Esnaider Reales (51.52); Sebastián Camacho (51.58); Omar Pinzón (49.93); Santiago Corredor (50.42)	3:23.45	Q
6	1	3	Argentina	Matias Santizo (49.73); Ulises Saravia (51.49); Lucas Alba (52.79); Guido Buscaglia (49.63)	3:23.64	Q
7	1	5	Venezuela	Emil Perez (51.51); Jesus Lopez (52.82); Diego Mas Fraiz (51.33); Alberto Mestre (49.53)	3:25.19	Q
8	1	7	Peru	Ricardo Espinosa (52.02); Rafael Ponce (50.82); Carlos Cobos (54.49); Joaquín Vargas (56.57)	3:33.90	Q
9	2	7	Bahamas	Lamar Taylor (50.51); Mark-anthony Thompson (55.50); Jack Barr (56.25); Luke Thomson (54.92)	3:37.18	

=== Final ===
The final was also held on October 21.

Rank	Lane	Name	Nationality	Time	Notes
1st place, gold medalist(s)	4	Guilherme Caribé (48.41); Marcelo Chierighini (48.00); Victor Alcará (48.34); Felipe Ribeiro de Souza (48.76)	Brazil	3:13.51	
2nd place, silver medalist(s)	5	Jonathan Kulow (48.45); Adam Chaney (48.17); Jack Aikins (48.60); Brooks Curry (49.00)	United States	3:14.22	
3rd place, bronze medalist(s)	3	Javier Acevedo (48.75); Edouard Fullum-Huot (49.31); Stephen Calkins (49.29); Finlay Knox (48.48)	Canada	3:15.83	
4	6	Jorge Iga (49.59); Andres Dupont (49.27); Gabriel Castaño (50.17); Ángel Martínez ( 50.16)	Mexico	3:19.19	
5	1	Alberto Mestre (59.38); Alfonso Mestre (50.07); Emil Perez (50.39); Jesus Lopez (50.95)	Venezuela	3:20.79	
6	7	Guido Buscaglia (49.71); Matias Santizo (49.63); Joaquin Piñero (51.79); Ulises Saravia (51.21)	Argentina	3:22.34	
7	2	Omar Pinzón (51.19); Juan Morales (51.68); Sebastián Camacho (50.65); Santiago Corredor (49.88)	Colombia	3:23.40	
8	8	Ricardo Espinosa (52.29); Rafael Ponce (50.97); Carlos Cobos (55.11); Joaquín Vargas (51.97)	Peru	3:30.34	
