= Wrestling at the 2023 Pan American Games – Men's freestyle 86 kg =

Men's Freestyle 86 kg at the 2023 Pan American Games
- Venue: Olympic Training Center in Ñuñoa
- Dates: November 2
- Competitors: 10 from 10 nations

Medalists
Gold medal	Yurieski Torreblanca	Cuba
Silver medal	Mark Hall	United States
Bronze medal	Hunter Lee	Canada
Bronze medal	Pedro Ceballos	Venezuela

The men's freestyle 86 kg competition of the Wrestling events at the 2023 Pan American Games in Ñuñoa was held on November 2, 2023.

== Qualification ==
The winner of each weight category at the 2021 Junior Pan American Games in Cali; Colombia qualified directly, along with the top four at the 2022 Pan American Wrestling Championships and 2023 Pan American Wrestling Championships. The host country (Chile) is guaranteed a spot in each event, but its athletes must compete in both the 2022 and 2023 Pan American Championship. If Chile does not qualify at any of the first two events, it will take the fourth spot available at the 2023 Pan American Championships. A further six wildcards (four men and two women) will be awarded to nations without any qualified athlete but took part in the qualification tournaments.

== Schedule ==
All times are local (UTC−3)

Date	Time	Event
Wednesday, 2 November 2023	10:00	Round of 16
Wednesday, 2 November 2023	10:00	Quarterfinals
Wednesday, 2 November 2023	11:00	Semifinals
Wednesday, 2 November 2023	12:45	Repechage
Wednesday, 2 November 2023	17:00	Finals

== Results ==
Legend

- F — Won by fall

=== Main Bracket ===
Round of 16
Ethan Ramos (PUR)	10
Noel Torres (MEX)	0
Carlos Izquierdo (COL)	0
Yurieski Torreblanca (CUB)	8

Quarterfinals
Guilherme Porto (BRA)	3
Ethan Ramos (PUR)	10^{F}
Hunter Lee (CAN)	2
Mark Hall (USA)	12
Eduardo Gajardo (CHI)	1
Pedro Ceballos (VEN)	12
Yurieski Torreblanca (CUB)	10
Rashji Mackey (BAH)	0

Semifinals
Ethan Ramos (PUR)	0
Mark Hall (USA)	7
Pedro Ceballos (VEN)	0
Yurieski Torreblanca (CUB)	4

Finals
Mark Hall (USA)	1
Yurieski Torreblanca (CUB)	3

=== Repechage ===
Repechage round 1
Carlos Izquierdo (COL)	4^{F}
Rashji Mackey (BAH)	0

Bronze medal match
Hunter Lee (CAN)	14
Ethan Ramos (PUR)	4
Carlos Izquierdo (COL)	7
Pedro Ceballos (VEN)	7

== Final standing ==
Rank	Athlete
1st place, gold medalist(s)	Yurieski Torreblanca (CUB)
2nd place, silver medalist(s)	Mark Hall (USA)
3rd place, bronze medalist(s)	Hunter Lee (CAN)
3rd place, bronze medalist(s)	Pedro Ceballos (VEN)
5	Ethan Ramos (PUR)
5	Carlos Izquierdo (COL)
7	Eduardo Gajardo (CHI)
8	Guilherme Porto (BRA)
9	Noel Torres (MEX)
10	Rashji Mackey (BAH)
