= Swimming at the 2015 Pan American Games – Women's 100 metre freestyle =

Women's 100 metre freestyle at the 2015 Pan American Games
- Venue: CIBC Pan Am/Parapan Am Aquatics Centre and Field House
- Dates: July 14 (preliminaries and finals)
- Competitors: 28 from 24 nations
- Winning time: 53.83

Medalists
| Gold medal | Chantal van Landeghem | Canada |
| Silver medal | Natalie Coughlin | United States |
| Bronze medal | Arianna Vanderpool-Wallace | Bahamas |

The women's 100 metre freestyle competition of the swimming events at the 2015 Pan American Games took place on July 14 at the CIBC Pan Am/Parapan Am Aquatics Centre and Field House in Toronto, Canada. The defending Pan American Games champion was Amanda Kendall of the United States.

This race consisted of two lengths of the pool, both lengths in freestyle. The top eight swimmers from the heats would qualify for the A final (where the medals would be awarded), while the next best eight swimmers would qualify for the B final.

== Records ==
Prior to this competition, the existing world and Pan American Games records were as follows:

| World Record | Britta Steffen (GER) | 52.07 | Rome, Italy | July 31, 2009 |
| Pan American Games record | Amanda Weir (USA) | 54.46 | Santo Domingo, Dominican Republic | August 11, 2003 |

The following new records were set during this competition.

| Date | Event | Name | Nationality | Time | Record |
|---|---|---|---|---|---|
| 14 July | Heats | Natalie Coughlin | United States | 53.85 | GR |
| 14 July | A Final | Chantal van Landeghem | Canada | 53.83 | GR |

== Qualification ==
Each National Olympic Committee (NOC) was able to enter up to two entrants providing they had met the A standard (56.91) in the qualifying period (January 1, 2014 to May 1, 2015). NOCs were also permitted to enter one athlete providing they had met the B standard (1:00.32) in the same qualifying period. All other competing athletes were entered as universality spots.

== Schedule ==
All times are Eastern Time Zone (UTC-4).

| Date | Time | Round |
|---|---|---|
| July 14, 2015 | 10:05 | Heats |
| July 14, 2015 | 19:05 | Final B |
| July 14, 2015 | 19:10 | Final A |

== Results ==
| KEY: | q | Fastest non-qualifiers | Q | Qualified | GR | Games record | NR | National record | PB | Personal best | SB | Seasonal best |

=== Heats ===
The first round was held on July 14.

| Rank | Heat | Lane | Name | Nationality | Time | Notes |
|---|---|---|---|---|---|---|
| 1 | 3 | 4 | Natalie Coughlin | United States | 53.85 | QA, GR |
| 2 | 4 | 4 | Arianna Vanderpool-Wallace | Bahamas | 54.00 | QA |
| 3 | 4 | 5 | Chantal van Landeghem | Canada | 54.31 | QA |
| 4 | 3 | 5 | Amanda Weir | United States | 54.36 | QA |
| 5 | 2 | 5 | Larissa Oliveira | Brazil | 55.01 | QA |
| 6 | 2 | 4 | Michelle Williams | Canada | 55.29 | QA |
| 7 | 3 | 6 | Vanessa García | Puerto Rico | 55.45 | QA |
| 8 | 4 | 3 | Graciele Herrmann | Brazil | 55.54 | QA |
| 9 | 4 | 6 | Liliana Ibáñez | Mexico | 55.80 | QB |
| 10 | 3 | 3 | Isabella Arcila | Colombia | 56.12 | QB |
| 11 | 2 | 3 | Alia Atkinson | Jamaica | 56.29 | QB |
| 12 | 3 | 7 | Arlene Semeco | Venezuela | 56.56 | QB |
| 13 | 3 | 2 | Aixa Triay | Argentina | 56.82 | QB |
| 14 | 2 | 2 | Elisbet Gamez | Cuba | 56.94 | QB |
| 15 | 4 | 2 | Chinyere Pigot | Suriname | 57.29 | QB |
| 16 | 2 | 7 | McKenna DeBever | Peru | 57.40 | QB |
| 17 | 4 | 7 | Karen Torrez | Bolivia | 57.49 | |
| 18 | 2 | 6 | Ariel Weech | Bahamas | 57.80 | |
| 19 | 3 | 1 | Allyson Ponson | Aruba | 57.89 | |
| 20 | 4 | 1 | Loren Bahamonde | Ecuador | 58.29 | |
| 21 | 4 | 8 | Inés Remersaro | Uruguay | 58.81 | |
| 22 | 3 | 8 | Marie Meza | Costa Rica | 58.89 | |
| 23 | 2 | 1 | Karen Riveros | Paraguay | 58.94 | |
| 24 | 2 | 8 | Elinah Phillip | British Virgin Islands | 1:00.76 | |
| 25 | 1 | 4 | Dalia Torrez | Nicaragua | 1:01.48 | |
| 26 | 1 | 3 | Jamaris Washshah | Virgin Islands | 1:01.68 | |
| 27 | 1 | 5 | Samantha Roberts | Antigua and Barbuda | 1:02.66 | |
| 28 | 1 | 6 | Onika George | Guyana | 1:05.00 | |

=== B Final ===
The B final was also held on July 14.

| Rank | Lane | Name | Nationality | Time | Notes |
|---|---|---|---|---|---|
| 9 | 4 | Liliana Ibáñez | Mexico | 55.90 | |
| 10 | 5 | Isabella Arcila | Colombia | 56.37 | |
| 11 | 6 | Elisbet Gamez | Cuba | 56.84 | |
| 12 | 3 | Aixa Triay | Argentina | 56.87 | |
| 13 | 2 | Chinyere Pigot | Suriname | 57.25 | |
| 14 | 7 | McKenna DeBever | Peru | 57.56 | |
| 15 | 8 | Ariel Weech | Bahamas | 57.79 | |
| 15 | 1 | Karen Torrez | Bolivia | 57.79 | |

=== A Final ===
The A final was also held on July 14.

| Rank | Lane | Name | Nationality | Time | Notes |
|---|---|---|---|---|---|
| 1st place, gold medalist(s) | 3 | Chantal van Landeghem | Canada | 53.83 | GR, NR |
| 2nd place, silver medalist(s) | 4 | Natalie Coughlin | United States | 54.06 | |
| 3rd place, bronze medalist(s) | 5 | Arianna Vanderpool-Wallace | Bahamas | 54.15 | |
| 4 | 7 | Michelle Williams | Canada | 54.55 | |
| 5 | 2 | Larissa Oliveira | Brazil | 54.61 | =SA |
| 6 | 8 | Graciele Herrmann | Brazil | 55.01 | |
| 7 | 1 | Vanessa García | Puerto Rico | 55.26 | |
| 8 | 6 | Amanda Weir | United States | 55.73 | |
