= Bahamas at the 2015 Pan American Games =

- IOC code: BAH
- NOC: Bahamas Olympic Committee

in Toronto, Canada 10–26 July 2015
- Competitors: 39 in 5 sports
- Flag bearer (opening): Arianna Vanderpool-Wallace
- Flag bearer (closing): Ramon Miller
- Medals Ranked 16th: Gold 2 Silver 2 Bronze 2 Total 6

Pan American Games appearances (overview)
- 1955; 1959; 1963; 1967; 1971; 1975; 1979; 1983; 1987; 1991; 1995; 1999; 2003; 2007; 2011; 2015; 2019; 2023; 2027

The Bahamas competed at the 2015 Pan American Games in Toronto, Ontario, Canada from July 10 to 26, 2015.

On July 2, 2015, the Bahamas Olympic Committee named a provisional squad of 36 athletes in five sports (which was later increased to 38, after the approval of three additional track and field athletes). This marked an increase of 17 athletes from the last edition of the games in 2011. This also marked the country's debut in the sport of gymnastics at the Pan American Games. Swimmer Arianna Vanderpool-Wallace was the flagbearer for the team during the opening ceremony.

Bahamas finished the Games with a total of six medals (two of each kind), doubling the total the country won four years prior in Guadalajara.

== Competitors ==
The following table lists Bahamas' delegation per sport and gender.

Sport	Men	Women	Total
Athletics	16	13	29
Boxing	3	0	3
Gymnastics	0	1	1
Swimming	1	4	5
Tennis	1	0	1
Total	21	18	39

== Medalists ==
The following competitors from The Bahamas won medals at the games. In the by discipline sections below, medalists' names are bolded.

Medal	Name	Sport	Event	Date
Gold	Arianna Vanderpool-Wallace	Swimming	Women's 50m freestyle	July 17
Gold	Jeffery Gibson	Athletics	Men's 400m Hurdles	July 23
Silver	Leevan Sands	Athletics	Men's Triple Jump	July 24
Silver	Bianca Stuart	Athletics	Women's Long Jump	July 24
Bronze	Arianna Vanderpool-Wallace	Swimming	Women's 100m freestyle	July 14
Bronze	Donald Thomas	Athletics	Men's High Jump	July 25

**Medals by sport**
**Sport**	1st place, gold medalist(s)	2nd place, silver medalist(s)	3rd place, bronze medalist(s)	**Total**
Athletics	1	2	1	4
Swimming	1	0	1	2
**Total**	**2**	**2**	**2**	**6**

**Medals by day**
**Day**	1st place, gold medalist(s)	2nd place, silver medalist(s)	3rd place, bronze medalist(s)	**Total**
July 14	0	0	1	1
July 17	1	0	0	1
July 23	1	0	0	1
July 24	0	2	0	2
July 25	0	0	1	1
**Total**	**2**	**2**	**2**	**6**

**Medals by gender**
**Gender**	1st place, gold medalist(s)	2nd place, silver medalist(s)	3rd place, bronze medalist(s)	**Total**
Male	1	1	1	3
Female	1	1	1	3
**Total**	**2**	**2**	**2**	**6**

**Multiple medalists**
**Name**	**Sport**	1st place, gold medalist(s)	2nd place, silver medalist(s)	3rd place, bronze medalist(s)	**Total**
Arianna Vanderpool-Wallace	Swimming	1	0	1	2

== Athletics ==
The Bahamas qualified 29 athletes in track and field (16 men and 13 women).

Key

- Note – Ranks given for track events are for the entire round
- Q = Qualified for the next round
- q = Qualified for the next round as a fastest loser or, in field events, by position without achieving the qualifying target
- PB = Personal best
- SB = Seasonal best
- DNS = Did not start
- N/A = Round not applicable for the event

Men

Athlete	Event	Round 1		Semifinal		Final	
Athlete	Event	Result	Rank	Result	Rank	Result	Rank
Johnathan Farquharson	100 m	10.48	20	did not advance			
Shavez Hart	100 m	10.13	8 Q	10.18	11	did not advance	
Elroy McBride	200 m	21.05	24	did not advance			
Ramon Miller	400 m	—N/a		48.54	16	did not advance	
Latoy Williams	400 m	—N/a		46.81	12	did not advance	
Jeffery Gibson	400 m hurdles	—N/a		50.74	8 Q	48.51 PB	1st place, gold medalist(s)
Johnathan Farquharson; Warren Fraser; Shavez Hart; Elroy McBride; Teray Smith	4 x 100 metres relay	—N/a		39.53	9	did not advance	
Andretti Bain; Jeffery Gibson; Michael Matieu; Ramon Miller; Alonzo Russell; Latoy Williams	4 x 400 metres relay	—N/a		3:01:00	1 Q	3:00:34	4

Field events

Athlete	Event	Qualification		Final	
Athlete	Event	Distance	Position	Distance	Position
Ryan Ingraham	High jump	—N/a		2.25	6
Donald Thomas	High jump	—N/a		2.28	3rd place, bronze medalist(s)
Raymond Higgs	Long jump	DNS		—N/a	
Lathario Collie-Minns	Triple jump	—N/a		16.08	=10
Leevan Sands	Triple jump	—N/a		16.99 SB	2nd place, silver medalist(s)

Women

Athlete	Event	Round 1		Semifinal		Final	
Athlete	Event	Result	Rank	Result	Rank	Result	Rank
Sheniqua Ferguson	200 m	23.03 SB	8 q	23.03	11	did not advance	
Anthonique Strachan	200 m	23.10	10 Q	22.79	6 Q	DNF	
Lanece Clarke	400 m	—N/a		54.33	12	did not advance	
Adanaca Brown	100 m hurdles	—N/a		13.18	12	did not advance	
Devynne Charlton	100 m hurdles	—N/a		13.22	13	did not advance	
Adanaca Brown; Tayla Carter; Devynne Charlton; Carmiesha Cox; Sheniqua Ferguson; Anthonique Strachan	4 x 100 metres relay	—N/a		44.34	5 Q	44.38	7
Christine Amertil; Miriam Byfield; Lanece Clarke; Carmiesha Cox; Shakeitha Henfield; Katrina Seymour	4 x 400 metres relay	—N/a		3:31.18 SB	5 Q	3:31.60	5

Field events

Athlete	Event	Final	
Athlete	Event	Distance	Position
Bianca Stuart	Long jump	6.61	2nd place, silver medalist(s)
Tamara Myers	Triple jump	13.57	10

== Boxing ==
The Bahamas qualified three male boxers.

Men

Athlete	Event	Preliminaries	Quarterfinals	Semifinals	Final
Athlete	Event	Opposition Result	Opposition Result	Opposition Result	Opposition Result
Rashield Williams	Light welterweight	Feliciano (USA); L 1–2	did not advance		
Carl Hield	Welterweight	Palmetta (ARG); L 0–3	did not advance		
Kieshno Major	Super heavyweight	Pero (CUB); L 0–3	did not advance		

== Gymnastics ==
The Bahamas qualified one gymnast. This marked the country's debut in gymnastics at the Pan American Games.

Artistic
Women

Athlete	Event	Qualification						Final					
Athlete	Event	Apparatus				Total	Rank	Apparatus				Total	Rank
Athlete	Event	F	V	UB	BB	Total	Rank	F	V	UB	BB	Total	Rank
Kianna Dean	All-Around	9.650	12.250	2.550	8.150	32.600	41	did not advance					

== Swimming ==
The Bahamas qualified four female swimmers, and one male swimmer, for a total of five.

Key

- Note – Ranks given are for the entire round
- FA = Qualified for the A Finals
- FB = Qualified for the B Finals
- DNS = Did not start

Men

Athlete	Event	Heat		Final	
Athlete	Event	Time	Rank	Time	Rank
Dustin Tynes	100 m breaststroke	1:03.15	11 FB	1:02.49	10
Dustin Tynes	200 m breaststroke	2:18.13	14 FB	2:18.14	14

Women

Athlete	Event	Heat		Final	
Athlete	Event	Time	Rank	Time	Rank
Joanna Evans	400 m freestyle	4:15.51	4 FA	4:14.51	6
Joanna Evans	800 m freestyle	—N/a		8:37.18	5
Laura Morely	100 m breaststroke	1:14.70	13 FB	1:15.20	15
Laura Morely	200 m breaststroke	2:40.28	13 FB	2:42.99	13
Arianna Vanderpool-Wallace	50 m freestyle	24.31	1 FA	24.38	1st place, gold medalist(s)
Arianna Vanderpool-Wallace	100 m freestyle	54.00	2 FA	54.15	3rd place, bronze medalist(s)
Arianna Vanderpool-Wallace	100 m butterfly	59.33	6 FA	DNS	
Ariel Weech	50 m freestyle	26.32	16 FB	26.28	15
Ariel Weech	100 m freestyle	57.80	17 FB	57.79	15

== Tennis ==
The Bahamas qualified one athlete in the men's singles event.

Men

Athlete	Event	Round of 64	Round of 32	Round of 16	Quarterfinals	Semifinals	Final / BM	
Athlete	Event	Opposition Score	Opposition Score	Opposition Score	Opposition Score	Opposition Score	Opposition Score	Rank
Philip Major	Singles	James (GRN); L 4–6, 6–4, 3–6	did not advance					

== See also ==
- Bahamas at the 2016 Summer Olympics
