= Swimming at the 2023 Pan American Games – Men's 1500 metre freestyle =

Men's 1500 metre freestyle at the 2023 Pan American Games
- Venue: Aquatic Center
- Dates: October 25, 2023
- Competitors: 19 from 14 nations
- Winning time: 15:09.29

Medalists
Gold medal	Guilherme Costa	Brazil
Silver medal	Will Gallant	United States
Bronze medal	Alfonso Mestre	Venezuela

The men's 1500 metre freestyle competition of the swimming events at the 2023 Pan American Games were held on October 25, 2023, at the Aquatic Center in Santiago.

== Records ==
Prior to this competition, the existing world and Pan American Games records were as follows:

World record	Sun Yang (CHN)	14:31.02	London, Great Britain	August 4, 2012
Pan American Games record	Ryan Cochrane (CAN)	15:06.40	Toronto, Canada	July 18, 2015

== Results ==
The finals were held on October 25.

Rank	Heat	Lane	Name	Nationality	Time	Notes
1st place, gold medalist(s)	3	4	Guilherme Costa	Brazil	15:09.29	
2nd place, silver medalist(s)	3	5	Will Gallant	United States	15:12.94	
3rd place, bronze medalist(s)	3	3	Alfonso Mestre	Venezuela	15:19.60	
4	3	2	Pedro Guastelli Farias	Brazil	15:25.26	
5	3	8	Dylan Porges	Mexico	15:28.53	
6	3	7	Lucas Ezekiel Alba	Argentina	15:33.32	
7	3	1	Alexander Axon	Canada	15:35.05	
8	2	4	Timothé Barbeau	Canada	15:35.59	
9	2	7	Julio Diego	Honduras	15:42.82	
10	2	5	Santiago Gutierrez	Mexico	15:43.39	
11	2	6	Gian Franco Turco	Argentina	15:47.95	
12	2	2	Rodolpho Falcón	Cuba	15:54.41	
13	3	6	Stephan Steverink	Brazil	15:56.02	
14	2	3	Eduardo Cisternas	Chile	16:02.34	
15	2	1	Christian Bayo	Puerto Rico	16:05.96	
16	1	4	Rafael Ponce	Peru	16:15.75	
17	2	8	Sebastián Camacho	Colombia	16:20.87	
18	1	5	Jack Barr	Bahamas	17:38.10	
—N/a	1	3	Diego Alvarado	El Salvador	DNS	
