= Ashley McGregor =

Canadian swimmer

Personal information
- Full name: Ashley McGregor
- Born: March 1, 1993 (age 33) Pointe-Claire, Quebec
- Height: 1.68 m (5 ft 6 in)
- Weight: 59 kg (130 lb)

Sport
- Sport: Swimming
- Strokes: Breaststroke
- Club: Pointe Claire Swim Club
- College team: Texas A&M University
Medal record
Women's Swimming
Pan American Games
Gold medal – first place	2011 Guadalajara	200 m breaststroke
Silver medal – second place	2011 Guadalajara	4 x 100 m medley
Bronze medal – third place	2011 Guadalajara	100 m breaststroke
Bronze medal – third place	2011 Guadalajara	4 x 100 m freestyle

Ashley McGregor (born March 1, 1993) is a female swimmer from Canada, who mostly competes in the breaststroke events. She claimed two invidividual medals and two in the relay for four at the 2011 Pan American Games in Guadalajara, Jalisco, Mexico. McGregor started the games by winning a bronze in the 100 m breaststroke followed by a gold in the 200 m. It was the first and only Canadian gold medal in the swimming events the 2011 Pan American Games. McGregor then went on to win a silver medal as part of the Canadian women's 4 x 100 m medley relay team. She earned her fourth medal with a bronze as part of Canada's 4 x 100 freestyle relay team.
