= Jack Aikins =

American swimmer (born 2002)

Personal information
- National team: United States
- Born: October 11, 2002 (age 23) Atlanta, Georgia, U.S.
- Height: 6 ft 5 in (196 cm)
- Weight: 200 lb (91 kg)

Sport
- Sport: Swimming
- Strokes: Backstroke, freestyle, individual medley
- Club: SwimAtlanta
- College team: University of Virginia
Medal record
Men's swimming
Representing the United States
World Championships (LC)
Gold medal – first place	2024 Doha	4×100 m medley
Gold medal – first place	2024 Doha	4×100 m mixed medley
Bronze medal – third place	2024 Doha	4×100 m freestyle
Bronze medal – third place	2024 Doha	4×100 m mixed freestyle
Pan Pacific Championships
Bronze medal – third place	2026 Irvine	100 m backstroke
Bronze medal – third place	2026 Irvine	4×100 m medley
Pan American Games
Gold medal – first place	2023 Santiago	200 m backstroke
Gold medal – first place	2023 Santiago	4×100 m medley
Gold medal – first place	2023 Santiago	4×100 m mixed medley
Silver medal – second place	2023 Santiago	4×100 m freestyle

Jack Aikins (born October 11, 2002) is an American swimmer. At the 2024 World Aquatics Championships, he won gold medals in the 4×100 meter medley, and mixed 4×100 meter medley. He currently competes at the collegiate level for Virginia.

== Early life and education ==
Aikins was born to Brad and Maureen Aikins, and has two sisters, Katherine and Caroline. Both of his sisters swam for Georgia.

In October 2019, he verbally committed to Virginia for the class of 2025.

== Career ==
=== 2023 ===
At the 2023 Pan American Games, Aikins won a gold medal in the 200-meter backstroke with a Pan American Games records time of 1:56.58. He also won gold medals in the 4×100 meter medley relay, and mixed 4×100 meter medley relay events, and a silver medal in the 4×100 meter freestyle relay.

=== 2024 ===
At the 2024 World Aquatics Championships, he swam during the heats in the 4×100 meter medley relay and mixed 4×100 meter medley relay events and won gold medals. He also won bronze medals in the 4×100 meter freestyle relay and mixed 4×100 meter freestyle relay events.

In June 2024, at the 2024 United States Olympic trials, he placed third in both the 100 meter and 200 meter backstroke events, and failed to qualify for the 2024 Summer Olympics. In the year leading up to Trials, he opted to take a redshirt year from collegiate competition at Virginia to focus on long-course racing and his training.

=== 2025 ===
At the 2025 USA Swimming Championships, he won the 200-meter backstroke with a time of 1:54.25, as a result, he was named to team USA's roster for the 2025 World Aquatics Championships
