= Swimming at the 2023 Pan American Games – Men's 200 metre breaststroke =

Men's 200 metre breaststroke at the 2023 Pan American Games
- Venue: Aquatic Center
- Date: October 23, 2023
- Competitors: 25 from 18 nations
- Winning time: 2:13.25

Medalists
Gold medal	Jacob Foster	United States
Silver medal	Braydem Taivassalo	Canada
Bronze medal	Andrés Bustamante	Mexico

The men's 200 metre breaststroke competition of the swimming events at the 2023 Pan American Games were held on October 23, 2023, at the Aquatic Center in Santiago, Chile.

== Records ==
World record	Qin Haiyang (CHN)	2:05.48	Fukuoka, Japan	July 28, 2023
Pan American Games record	Will Licon (USA)	2:07.62	Lima, Peru	August 8, 2019

== Results ==
KEY:	QA	Qualified for A final	QB	Qualified for B final	GR	Games record	NR	National record	PB	Personal best	SB	Seasonal best	WD	Withdrew

=== Heats ===
The first round was held on October 25.

Rank	Heat	Lane	Name	Nationality	Time	Notes
1	4	4	Jacob Foster	United States	2:13.25	QA
2	4	5	Brayden Taivassalo	Canada	2:13.40	QA
3	2	2	Roberto Bonilla	Independent Athletes Team	2:14.83	QA
4	2	5	Andrés Puente	Mexico	2:14.96	QA
5	3	2	Xavier Ruiz	Puerto Rico	2:15.06	QA
6	3	5	Noah Nichols	United States	2:16.05	QA
7	3	3	Raphael Windmuller	Brazil	2:16.13	QA
8	2	4	James Dergousoff	Canada	2:16.14	QA
9	4	2	Tyler Christianson	Panama	2:1637	QB
10	3	4	Miguel de Lara	Mexico	2:16.58	QB
11	4	3	Jorge Murillo	Colombia	2:17.12	WD
12	2	3	Gabriel Morelli	Argentina	2:17.31	QB
13	3	6	Mariano Lazzerini	Chile	2:17.37	QB
14	4	7	Carlos Kossio	Mexico	2:17.77	QB
15	4	1	Vicente Villanueva	Chile	2:18.47	QB
16	3	1	Eric Veit	Venezuela	2:19.43	QB
17	4	6	Juan Bautista Carrocia	Argentina	2:21.36	WD
18	4	8	Emmanuel Gadson	Bahamas	2:21.56	QB
19	3	7	Juan García	Colombia	2:23.00	
20	2	1	Josue Domínguez	Dominican Republic	2:24.53	
21	2	7	Adriel Sans	Virgin Islands	2:26.49	
22	1	5	Kito Campbell	Jamaica	2:27.44	
23	1	4	Samuel Williamson	Bermuda	2:28.54	
24	1	3	Nector Segovia	El Salvador	2:49.77	
—N/a	2	6	Julio Antonio Horrego	Honduras	DNS	

=== Final B ===
The B final was also held on October 25.

Rank	Lane	Name	Nationality	Time	Notes
9	5	Miguel de Lara	Mexico	2:13.22	
10	4	Tyler Christianson	Panama	2:15.47	
11	6	Mariano Lazzerini	Chile	2:16.75	
12	7	Vicente Villanueva	Chile	2:17.06	
13	3	Gabriel Morelli	Argentina	2:17.64	
14	2	Carlos Kossio	Mexico	2:18.42	
15	1	Eric Veit	Venezuela	2:20.51	
16	8	Emmanuel Gadson	Bahamas	2:21.35	

=== Final A ===
The A final was also held on October 25.

Rank	Lane	Name	Nationality	Time	Notes
1st place, gold medalist(s)	4	Jacob Foster	United States	2:10.71	
2nd place, silver medalist(s)	5	Brayden Taivassalo	Canada	2:10.89	
3rd place, bronze medalist(s)	6	Andrés Puente	Mexico	2:11.99	
4	2	Xavier Ruiz	Puerto Rico	2:14.03	
5	7	Noah Nichols	United States	2:14.23	
6	3	Roberto Bonilla	Independent Athletes Team	2:14.34	
7	8	James Dergousoff	Canada	2:15.67	
8	1	Raphael Windmuller	Brazil	2:15.85	
