= Swimming at the 2023 Pan American Games – Men's 400 metre freestyle =

Men's 400 metre freestyle at the 2023 Pan American Games
- Venue: Aquatic Center
- Date: October 21, 2023
- Competitors: 23 from 18 nations

Medalists
| Gold medal | Guilherme Costa | Brazil |
| Silver medal | Alfonso Mestre | Venezuela |
| Bronze medal | James Plage | United States |

The men's 400 metre freestyle competition of the swimming events at the 2023 Pan American Games were held on October 21, 2023, at the Aquatic Center in Santiago, Chile.

== Records ==
Prior to this competition, the existing world and Pan American Games records were as follows:

| World record | Paul Biedermann (GER) | 3:40.07 | Rome, Italy | July 26, 2009 |
| Pan American Games record | Ryan Cochrane (CAN) | 3:48.29 | Toronto, Canada | July 17, 2015 |

The following record was established during the competition:

| Date | Event | Swimmer | Nation | Time | Record |
|---|---|---|---|---|---|
| October 21 | Final | Guilherme Costa | Brazil | 3:46.79 | GR |

== Results ==
| KEY: | QA | Qualified for A final | QB | Qualified for B final | GR | Games record | NR | National record | PB | Personal best | SB | Seasonal best | WD | Withdrew |

=== Heats ===
The first round was held on October 21.

| Rank | Heat | Lane | Name | Nationality | Time | Notes |
|---|---|---|---|---|---|---|
| 1 | 3 | 4 | Guilherme Costa | Brazil | 3:52.23 | QA |
| 2 | 3 | 3 | Jay Litherland | United States | 3:55.00 | QA |
| 3 | 3 | 5 | Alexander Steverink | Brazil | 3:55.21 | QA |
| 4 | 2 | 4 | Alfonso Mestre | Venezuela | 3:55.67 | QA |
| 5 | 3 | 1 | Dylan Porges | Mexico | 3:55.84 | QA |
| 6 | 2 | 5 | James Plage | United States | 3:55.90 | QA |
| 7 | 3 | 7 | Eduardo Cisternas | Chile | 3:56.31 | QA |
| 8 | 2 | 3 | Juan Morales | Colombia | 3:56.34 | QA |
| 9 | 2 | 6 | Santiago Corredor | Colombia | 3:56.75 | WD |
| 10 | 3 | 6 | Jeremy Bagshaw | Canada | 3:57.43 | WD |
| 11 | 3 | 2 | Joaquín Vargas | Peru | 3:57.78 | QB |
| 12 | 2 | 7 | Jose Cano | Mexico | 3:58.60 | QB |
| 13 | 2 | 2 | Yu Tong Wu | Canada | 3:59.11 | QB |
| 14 | 3 | 8 | Christian Bayo | Puerto Rico | 4:02.32 | QB |
| 15 | 2 | 1 | Diego Dulieu | Honduras | 4:02.45 | QB |
| 16 | 1 | 5 | Alberto Vega | Costa Rica | 4:05.79 | QB |
| 17 | 1 | 4 | Raekwon Noel | Guyana | 4:07.38 | QB |
| 18 | 1 | 7 | James Allison | Cayman Islands | 4:07.94 | QB |
| 19 | 1 | 3 | Gerald Hernandez | Nicaragua | 4:10.36 | |
| 20 | 2 | 8 | Noah Mascoll-Gomes | Antigua and Barbuda | 4:11.50 | |
| 21 | 1 | 1 | Luke-Kennedy Thompson | Bahamas | 4:11.61 | |
| 22 | 1 | 2 | Christopher Gossman | Independent Athletes Team | 4:13.21 | |
| 23 | 1 | 6 | Jose Campo | El Salvador | 4:25.68 | |

=== Final B ===
The B final was also held on October 21.

| Rank | Lane | Name | Nationality | Time | Notes |
|---|---|---|---|---|---|
| 9 | 3 | Yu Tong Wu | Canada | 3:57.85 | |
| 10 | 4 | Joaquín Vargas | Peru | 3:58.06 | |
| 11 | 5 | Jose Cano | Mexico | 4:00.33 | |
| 12 | 6 | Christian Bayo | Puerto Rico | 4:02.26 | |
| 13 | 2 | Diego Dulieu | Honduras | 4:02.86 | |
| 14 | 7 | Alberto Vega | Costa Rica | 4:05.54 | |
| 15 | 1 | Raekwon Noel | Guyana | 4:05.82 | |
| 16 | 8 | James Allison | Cayman Islands | 4:11.92 | |

=== Final A ===
The A final was also held on October 21.

| Rank | Lane | Name | Nationality | Time | Notes |
|---|---|---|---|---|---|
| 1st place, gold medalist(s) | 4 | Guilherme Costa | Brazil | 3.46.79 | GR |
| 2nd place, silver medalist(s) | 6 | Alfonso Mestre | Venezuela | 3:47.62 | |
| 3rd place, bronze medalist(s) | 7 | James Plage | United States | 3:50.74 | |
| 4 | 5 | Jay Litherland | United States | 3:52.72 | |
| 5 | 3 | Alexander Steverink | Brazil | 3:53.77 | |
| 6 | 8 | Juan Morales | Colombia | 3:54.44 | |
| 7 | 2 | Eduardo Cisternas | Chile | 3:54.70 | |
| 8 | 1 | Dylan Porges | Mexico | 3:55.12 | |
