= Bahamas at the 2011 Pan American Games =

- IOC code: BAH
- NOC: Bahamas Olympic Association

in Guadalajara 14–30 October 2011
- Competitors: 22 in 5 sports
- Flag bearer: Alicia Lightbourn
- Medals Ranked 15th: Gold 1 Silver 1 Bronze 1 Total 3

Pan American Games appearances (overview)
- 1955; 1959; 1963; 1967; 1971; 1975; 1979; 1983; 1987; 1991; 1995; 1999; 2003; 2007; 2011; 2015; 2019; 2023

The Bahamas competed at the 2011 Pan American Games in Guadalajara, Mexico from 14 to 30 October 2011. The Chef de Mission will be Don Cornish. The Bahamas team consisted of 22 athletes in five sports.

== Medalists ==
Medal	Name	Sport	Event	Date
Gold	Donald Thomas	Athletics	Men's high jump	27 October
Silver	Valentino Knowles	Boxing	Men's Light welterweight 64 kg	28 October
Bronze	Ramon Miller	Athletics	Men's 400 metres	26 October

== Athletics ==
The Bahamas team will consist of 13 athletes.

Athlete	Event	Preliminaries		Semifinals		Final	
Athlete	Event	Result	Rank	Result	Rank	Result	Rank
Adrian Griffith	100 m	10.41	13th q	10.51	14th	did not advance	
Jamial Rolle	100 m	10.45	15th q	10.49	11th	did not advance	
Michael Mathieu	200 m	20.81	7th Q	20.50	6th Q	20.62	4th
Chris Brown	400 m			45.92	6th Q	45.89	7th
Ramon Miller	400 m			45.40	1st Q	45.01	3rd place, bronze medalist(s)
O'neil Williams	5000 m					18:01.55	15th
Adrian Griffith; Jamial Rolle; Chris Brown; Michael Mathieu; Rodney Greene	4×100 m relay			40.05	6th q	did not start	
Ramon Miller; Michael Mathieu; Wesley Neymour; TBD	4×400 m relay			3:09.68	6th q	did not start	
Donald Thomas	High jump					2.32 m.	1st place, gold medalist(s)
Rudon Bastian	Long jump			7.73 m.	7th q	7.62	8th

Women

Athlete	Event	Preliminaries		Semifinals		Final	
Athlete	Event	Result	Rank	Result	Rank	Result	Rank
Petra McDonald	100 m hurdles			14.09	12th	did not advance	
Katrina Seymour	400 m hurdles			1:00.34	10th	did not advance	
Laverne Eve	Javelin throw					50.82 m.	9th

== Bowling ==
The Bahamas has received a wildcard to send a women's team.

Women
Individual

Athlete	Event	Qualification															Eighth Finals	Quarterfinals	Semifinals	Finals	
Athlete	Event	Block 1 (Games 1–6)						Block 2 (Games 7–12)						Total	Average	Rank	Eighth Finals	Quarterfinals	Semifinals	Finals	
Athlete	Event	1	2	3	4	5	6	7	8	9	10	11	12	Total	Average	Rank	Opposition Scores	Opposition Scores	Opposition Scores	Opposition Scores	Rank
Justina Sturrup	Women's individual	did not start																			
Joanne Woodside	Women's individual	149	148	160	159	195	163	144	190	146	123	176	186	1939	161.6	29th	did not advance				

Pairs

Athlete	Event	Block 1 (Games 1–6)								Block 2 (Games 7–12)								Grand Total	Final Rank
Athlete	Event	1	2	3	4	5	6	Total	Average	7	8	9	10	11	12	Total	Average	Grand Total	Final Rank
Justina Sturrup; Joanne Woodside	Women's pairs	142	138	159	124	171	182	916	152.7	158	143	169	143	154	141	1824	152.0	3784	16th
Justina Sturrup; Joanne Woodside	Women's pairs	151	169	163	210	141	155	989	164.8	155	117	189	166	164	180	1960	163.3	3784	16th

== Boxing ==
The Bahamas has qualified one boxer.

Men

Athlete	Event	Round of 16	Quarterfinals	Semifinals	Final
Athlete	Event	Opposition Result	Opposition Result	Opposition Result	Opposition Result
Valentino Knowles	Light welterweight	Luis Amador (NCA); W 17 – 7	Fabián Maidana (ARG); W 17+ – 17	Joelvis Hernandes (VEN); W 11 – 6	Roniel Iglesias (CUB); L 14 – 22 (silver)

== Swimming ==
The Bahamas will send a swimming team.

Men

Athlete	Event	Heats		Final	
Athlete	Event	Time	Rank	Time	Rank
Elvis Burrows	50 m freestyle	23.36	12th	did not advance	

Women

Athlete	Event	Heats		Final	
Athlete	Event	Time	Rank	Time	Rank
Ariel Weech	50 m freestyle	26.76	12th	did not advance	
Ariel Weech	100 m freestyle	57.97	11th	did not advance	
Alana Dillete	100 m backstroke	1:05.34	14th	did not advance	
Alana Dillete	100 m butterfly	1:02.32	9th	did not advance	
Alana Dillete	200 m medley	did not start			
McKayla Lightbourn	200 m backstroke	2:23.74	9th	did not advance	
McKayla Lightbourn	100 m breaststroke	1:15.95	20th	did not advance	
McKayla Lightbourn	200 m breaststroke	did not start			
McKayla Lightbourn	200 m medley	2:26.66	13th	did not advance	
Alicia Lightbourn	100 m breaststroke	1:15.66	19th	did not advance	
Ariel Weech; Alana Dillete; McKayla Lightbourn; Alicia Lightbourn	4x100m freestyle relay	3:58.13	6th Q	3:54.28	7th
Ariel Weech; Alana Dillete; McKayla Lightbourn; Alicia Lightbourn	4x100m medley relay	4:23.04	6th Q	4:16.97	6th

== Tennis ==
The Bahamas received a wildcard to send one male tennis player.

Men

Athlete	Event	Round of 64	Round of 32	Round of 16	Quarterfinals	Semifinals	Final	
Athlete	Event	Opposition Score	Opposition Score	Opposition Score	Opposition Score	Opposition Score	Opposition Score	Rank
Marvin Rolle	Singles	Mauricio Echazú (PER); W 6–3, 6–4	Víctor Estrella (DOM); L 2–6, 4–6	did not advance				
