= Wrestling at the 2019 Pan American Games – Men's freestyle 86 kg =

Men's Freestyle 86 kg at the 2019 Pan American Games
- Venue: Miguel Grau Coliseum
- Dates: August 10
- Competitors: 10 from 10 nations

Medalists
Gold medal	Yurieski Torreblanca	Cuba
Silver medal	Pedro Ceballos	Venezuela
Bronze medal	Carlos Izquierdo	Colombia
Bronze medal	Pat Downey	United States

The men's freestyle 86 kg competition of the Wrestling events at the 2019 Pan American Games in Lima was held on August 10 at the Miguel Grau Coliseum.

== Results ==
All times are local (UTC−5)

Legend

- F — Won by fall

=== Final ===
Qualifications
Ricardo Báez (ARG)	0
Alex Moore (CAN)	10
Diego Ramírez (PAR)	0
Yurieski Torreblanca (CUB)	12

Quarterfinals
Pedro Ceballos (VEN)	11
Christian Anguiano (MEX)	0
Carlos Izquierdo (COL)	6
Pool Ambrocio (PER)	4
Angus Arthur (JAM)	4
Pat Downey (USA)	14
Alex Moore (CAN)	0
Yurieski Torreblanca (CUB)	10

Semifinals
Pedro Ceballos (VEN)	10
Carlos Izquierdo (COL)	0
Pat Downey (USA)	2
Yurieski Torreblanca (CUB)	7

Finals
Pedro Ceballos (VEN)	3
Yurieski Torreblanca (CUB)	4

=== Repechage ===
Repechage round 1
Bye
Christian Anguiano (MEX)
Diego Ramírez (PAR)	0
Alex Moore (CAN)	10

Bronze medal match
Christian Anguiano (MEX)	5
Carlos Izquierdo (COL)	6
Alex Moore (CAN)	0
Pat Downey (USA)	5^{F}
