= Bahamas at the 1987 Pan American Games =

- IOC code: BAH
- NOC: Bahamas Olympic Association

in Indianapolis 7–23 August 1987
- Flag bearer: Durward Knowles
- Medals Ranked 18th: Gold 0 Silver 2 Bronze 3 Total 5

Pan American Games appearances (overview)
- 1955; 1959; 1963; 1967; 1971; 1975; 1979; 1983; 1987; 1991; 1995; 1999; 2003; 2007; 2011; 2015; 2019; 2023

The 10th Pan American Games were held in Indianapolis, United States from 7 to 23 August 1987.

== Medals ==
=== Silver ===
===== Athletics =====
- Men's High Jump: Troy Kemp
- Men's Discus Throw: Bradley Cooper

=== Bronze ===
===== Athletics =====
- Men's Triple Jump: Frank Rutherford
- Women's 100 metres: Pauline Davis-Thompson
- Women's 200 metres: Pauline Davis-Thompson

== See also ==
- Bahamas at the 1988 Summer Olympics
