= Bahamas at the 2003 Pan American Games =

- IOC code: BAH
- NOC: Bahamas Olympic Association

in Santo Domingo 1–17 August 2003
- Flag bearer: Donald Martinborough
- Medals Ranked 20th: Gold 0 Silver 2 Bronze 0 Total 2

Pan American Games appearances (overview)
- 1955; 1959; 1963; 1967; 1971; 1975; 1979; 1983; 1987; 1991; 1995; 1999; 2003; 2007; 2011; 2015; 2019; 2023

The 14th Pan American Games were held in Santo Domingo, Dominican Republic from August 1 to August 17, 2003.

== Medals ==
=== Silver ===
===== Athletics =====
- Women's Javelin: Laverne Eve
- Women's Long Jump: Jackie Edwards

== Results by event ==
=== Athletics ===
Track

Athlete	Event	Heat		Final	
Athlete	Event	Time	Rank	Time	Rank
Douglas Lynes-Bell	Men's 400 m hurdles	51.12	10	—	10
Damarius Cash	Men's 400 m hurdles	53.54	14	—	14

Field

Athlete	Event	Throws						Total	
Athlete	Event	1	2	3	4	5	6	Distance	Rank
Laverne Eve	Women's Javelin	X	60.42	X	X	X	60.68	60.68 m	2nd place, silver medalist(s)

=== Boxing ===
Athlete	Event	Round of 16	Quarterfinals	Semifinals	Final
Athlete	Event	Opposition Result	Opposition Result	Opposition Result	Opposition Result
Shimon Bain	Light Flyweight	Montero (DOM); L 10-37	did not advance		

=== Swimming ===
==== Men's Competition ====
Athlete	Event	Heat		Final	
Athlete	Event	Time	Rank	Time	Rank
Chris Vythoulkas	50 m freestyle	24.46	23	did not advance	
Chris Vythoulkas	100 m freestyle	52.53	23	did not advance	

==== Women's Competition ====
Athlete	Event	Heat		Final	
Athlete	Event	Time	Rank	Time	Rank
Nikia Deveaux	200 m freestyle	2:13.63	18	did not advance	

== See also ==
- Bahamas at the 2004 Summer Olympics
