= Guilherme Costa (swimmer) =

Brazilian swimmer (born 1998)

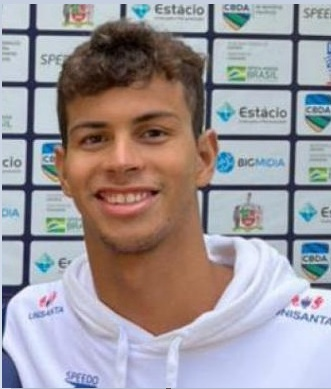
- Guilherme Costa

Personal information
- Full name: Guilherme Pereira da Costa
- Nickname: Cachorrão (Big Dog)
- Born: 1 October 1998 (age 28) Rio de Janeiro, Rio de Janeiro, Brazil
- Height: 1.85 m (6 ft 1 in)
- Weight: 72 kg (159 lb)

Sport
- Sport: Swimming
- Strokes: Freestyle
- Club: Esporte Clube Pinheiros
Medal record
Men's swimming
Representing Brazil
World Championships (LC)
Bronze medal – third place	2022 Budapest	400 m freestyle
Pan American Games
Gold medal – first place	2019 Lima	1500 m freestyle
Gold medal – first place	2023 Santiago	400 m freestyle
Gold medal – first place	2023 Santiago	800 m freestyle
Gold medal – first place	2023 Santiago	1500 m freestyle
Gold medal – first place	2023 Santiago	4×200 m freestyle
South American Games
Gold medal – first place	2018 Cochabamba	400 m freestyle
Gold medal – first place	2022 Asunción	400 m freestyle
Gold medal – first place	2022 Asunción	800 m freestyle
Gold medal – first place	2022 Asunción	1500 m freestyle
Gold medal – first place	2022 Asunción	4x200 m freestyle
Silver medal – second place	2018 Cochabamba	1500 m freestyle
Military World Games
Silver medal – second place	2019 Wuhan	400 m freestyle
Silver medal – second place	2019 Wuhan	4×200 m freestyle

Guilherme Pereira da Costa (born 1 October 1998) is a Brazilian swimmer. He is the 400m freestyle bronze medalist at the 2022 World Championships. At the Pan American Games, he was champion of the 400, 800 and 1500 metre freestyle. He is also currently the South American record holder in the 400, 800, and 1500 metre freestyle.

== International career ==
=== 2017–2021 ===
He competed in the men's 1500 metre freestyle event at the 2017 World Aquatics Championships, finishing in 19th place.

On 6 December 2017, participating in the Brazil Open (long course) in Rio de Janeiro, he broke the South American record in the 1500-metre freestyle with a time of 14:59.01. It was the fourth time in 2017 that he broke the South American record of this race.

At the 2018 South American Games in Cochabamba, he won the gold medal in the 400m and the silver medal in the 1500m freestyle.

On 30 June 2018, participating in the Sette Colli Trophy (long course) in Rome, he broke the South American record in the 800-metre freestyle with a time of 7:50.92.

At the 2018 Pan Pacific Swimming Championships in Tokyo, Japan, he finished 4th in the Men's 4 × 200 metre freestyle relay, 4th in the Men's 800 metre freestyle and 4th in the Men's 1500 metre freestyle.

At the 2019 World Aquatics Championships in Gwangju, South Korea, he finished 21st in the Men's 800 metre freestyle, and 25th in the Men's 1500 metre freestyle.

At the 2019 Pan American Games held in Lima, Peru, Costa won his biggest title, the gold medal in the Men's 1500 metre freestyle, with a time of 15:09.93. Brazil has not won this event at the Pan American Games since Tetsuo Okamoto won it in the first edition of the Games, in 1951.

In December 2019, participating in the U.S. Open (long course) in Atlanta, he broke the South American record in the 400-metre freestyle, with a time of 3:46.57, in the 800-metre freestyle, with a time of 7:47.37 and in the 1500-metre freestyle, with a time of 14:55.49.

On 19 April 2021, participating in the Brazilian Olympic Selection Trials, he lowered his South American record in the 400m freestyle with a time of 3:45.85.

=== 2020 Summer Olympics ===
At the 2020 Summer Olympics in Tokyo, Costa almost broke the South American record in the Men's 400 metre freestyle heats, with a time of 3:45.99. He finished in 11th place, 0.32s from getting a place in the final. In the 800 metre freestyle, he broke the South American record at heats with a time of 7:46.08, ranking 5th for the final. Costa finished 8th in the 800m freestyle final, and later, 13th in the heat of the 1500m freestyle.

=== 2021-24 ===
He did not attend the 2021 FINA World Swimming Championships (25 m), in Abu Dhabi, United Arab Emirates, because he felt some symptoms such as fever and malaise, which made him withdraw from the competition.

At the 2022 World Aquatics Championships, in Budapest, Hungary, he became the first Brazilian and South American in history to win a medal in the 400-meter freestyle event, obtaining bronze with a time of 3:43.31, a new South American record. It was the first medal by a South American in the men's 400 free from any major international meet since Argentinian Alberto Zorrilla at the 1928 Olympics. No South American had ever even qualified for the 400m freestyle final at the World Championships. In the 800m freestyle, Costa broke the South American record with a time of 7:45.48, finishing in 5th place, the best position ever obtained by a South American in the event (no South American swimmer had even reached the final of this event in World Championships). In the 1500m freestyle, Costa broke the South American record at heats, with a time of 14:53.03, qualifying 4th for the final. In the final, Costa destroyed the South American record, lowering it by more than 4 seconds, with a time of 14:48.53, finishing in 6th place and equaling the best mark in the history of Brazil in the race (6th place of Luiz Lima in 1998). After the pool events, he swam in the open waters in the Mixed 6km Relay Team, where Brazil finished in 5th place.

In September 2022, at the José Finkel Trophy in Recife, he broke the short course South American record in the 800-metre freestyle with a time of 7:41.23. and in the 1500-metre freestyle, with a time of 14:39.42.

He did not attend the 2022 FINA World Swimming Championships (25 m), in Melbourne, Australia, despite having an index for the competition.

At the 2023 World Aquatics Championships, in Fukuoka, Japan, he remained among the best in the world, finishing 4th in the 400 metre freestyle, 7th in the 800 metre freestyle and 8th in the 4x200 metre freestyle relay. He chose not to participate in the 1500 m freestyle, to swim the relay.

At the 2023 Pan American Games held in Santiago, Chile, Costa won 4 gold medals in the Men's 400 metre freestyle, with a time of 3.46.79, Pan American Games record; in the Men's 800 metre freestyle, with a time of 7:53.01, Pan American Games record; in the Men's 1500 metre freestyle, with a time of 15:09.29; and in the Men's 4 x 200 metre freestyle, with a time of 7:07.53, Pan American Games record.

At the 2024 World Aquatics Championships, he remained among the best in the world, finishing 4th in the 400 metre freestyle. Putting the 200m freestyle in his range of events for the first time, he reached the final with a time of 1:46.06 (Olympic index) in the semi-finals, being only the 2nd Brazilian in history to reach a World Championship final in this event. With the Doha calendar having been made with several freestyle events accumulated in the first few days, he swam the 800m freestyle heats but ended up running out of energy to finish the race properly - in the middle of the race, he gave up the attempt, finishing 27th with time of 7:58.02. In the 200m freestyle final, at night, he finished 8th with a time of 1:46.87. With him not qualifying for the final of the 4x200m freestyle, his coach opted to return immediately to training, continuing his preparation for the Olympic Games, removing him from the 1500m freestyle competition.

=== 2024 Summer Olympics ===
At the 2024 Olympic Games in Paris, Costa reached the final of the 400m freestyle, breaking the Americas record and finishing in 5th place, with a time of 3:42.76, just 0.26 seconds away from obtaining the bronze medal. It was the second best result in Brazil's history in this event at the Olympics, behind only Djan Madruga who obtained two 4th places in 1976 and 1980.

== Personal bests ==
As of July 27, 2024

Long course
Event	Time	Meet	Date	Note(s)
200 m freestyle	1:46.06	2024 World Championships	February 12, 2024	
400 m freestyle	3:42.76	2024 Summer Olympics	July 27, 2024	AM
800 m freestyle	7:45.48	2022 World Championships	June 21, 2022	SA
1500 m freestyle	14:48.53	2022 World Championships	June 25, 2022	SA

== Achievements ==
=== Olympic Games ===
- 400m freestyle: 5th (Paris 2024)
- 800m freestyle: 8th (Tokyo 2020)
- 1500m freestyle: 13th (Tokyo 2020)

=== FINA World Championships ===
- 200m freestyle: 8th (Doha 2024)
- 400m freestyle: (bronze) (Budapest 2022)
- 800m freestyle: 5th (Budapest 2022)
- 1500m freestyle: 6th (Budapest 2022)
- 4x200m freestyle relay: 8th (Fukuoka 2023)
- Open water swimming Team: 5th (Budapest 2022)
