= Swimming at the 2023 Pan American Games – Men's 4 × 200 metre freestyle relay =

Men's 4 × 200 metre freestyle relay at the 2023 Pan American Games
- Venue: Aquatic Center
- Dates: October 24 (Final)
- Competitors: 43 from 7 nations
- Winning time: 7:07.53

Medalists
Gold medal	Murilo Sartori; Breno Correia; Fernando Scheffer; Guilherme Costa; Luiz Altamir Melo; Leonardo Coelho Santos; Felipe Ribeiro de Souza	Brazil
Silver medal	Zane Grothe; Coby Carrozza; Brooks Curry; Jack Dahlgren; James Plage; Mason Laur; Lukas Davin Miller; Cristopher O'Connor	United States
Bronze medal	Jeremy Bagshaw; Finlay Knox; Alexander Axon; Javier Acevedo; Adam Wu; Blake Tierney; Raben Dommann	Canada

The men's 4 × 200 metre freestyle relay competition of the swimming events at the 2023 Pan American Games were held October 24, 2023 at the Aquatic Center in Santiago, Chile.

== Records ==
Prior to this competition, the existing world and Pan American Games records were as follows:

World record	United States (USA); Michael Phelps (1:44.49); Ricky Berens (1:44.13); David Walters (1:45.47); Ryan Lochte (1:44.46)	6:58.55	Rome, Italy	July 31, 2009
Pan American Games record	Brazil (BRA); Luiz Altamir Melo (1:48.10); Fernando Scheffer (1:46.36); João de Lucca (1:48.62); Breno Correia (1:47.58)	7:10.66	Lima, Peru	August 9, 2019

The following record was established during the competition:

Date	Event	Nation	Time	Record
October 26	Final	Brazil (BRA); Murilo Sartori (1:47.52); Breno Correia (1:47.60); Fernando Scheffer (1:45.90); Guilherme Costa (1:46.51)	7:07.53	GR

== Results ==
KEY:	Q	Qualified for final	GR	Games record	NR	National record	PB	Personal best	SB	Seasonal best

=== Heats ===
The first round was held on October 24.

Rank	Heat	Lane	Nation	Swimmers	Time	Notes
1	1	4	Brazil	Luiz Altamir Melo (1:48.32); Fernando Scheffer (1:47.85); Leonardo Coelho Santos (1:53.11); Felipe Ribeiro de Souza (1:53.10)	7:22.38	Q
2	2	5	Canada	Adam Wu (1:51.12); Alexander Axon (1:50.50); Blake Tierney (1:51.76); Raben Dommann (1:52.07)	7:25.45	Q
3	2	3	Mexico	Dylan Porges (1:51.41); Ángel Martínez (1:51.78); Jose Cano Figueroa (1:53.47); Santiago Gutierrez (1:53.81)	7:30.47	Q
4	2	4	United States	James Plage (1:51.90); Mason Laur (1:50.05); Lukas Davin Miller (1:54.34); Cristopher O'Connor (1:56.28)	7:32.57	Q
5	1	3	Colombia	Juan Morales (1:57.16); Esnaider Reales (1.57.75); David Arias (1:56.19); Santiago Corredor (1:54.80)	7:45.98	Q
6	1	5	Venezuela	Winston Rodriguez (1.53.12); Jorge Otaiza (1.56.20); Emil Perez (1:57.78); Jesus Lopez (2:03.47)	7:50.57	Q
7	2	6	Chile	Eduardo Cisternas (1:57.28); Mariano Lazzerini (2:00.49); Vicente Villanueva (2:02.38); Elías Ardiles (1:58.31)	7:58.46	Q
—	1	6	Honduras		DNS	
—	2	2	Independent Athletes Team		DNS	

=== Final ===
The final was also held on October 24.

Rank	Lane	Name	Nationality	Time	Notes
1st place, gold medalist(s)	4	Murilo Sartori (1:47.52); Breno Correia (1:47.60); Fernando Scheffer (1:45.90); Guilherme Costa (1:46.51)	Brazil	7:07.53	GR
2nd place, silver medalist(s)	6	Zane Grothe (1:47.98); Coby Carrozza (1:47.63); Brooks Curry (1:46.78); Jack Dahlgren (1:45.67)	United States	7:08.06	
3rd place, bronze medalist(s)	3	Jeremy Bagshaw (1:49.89); Finlay Knox (1:47.72); Alexander Axon (1:48.90); Javier Acevedo (1:48.25)	Canada	7:14.76	
4	3	Jorge Iga (1:48.28); Andres Dupont (1:48.15); Hector Ruvacalba (1:49.89); Dylan Porges ( 1:51.31)	Mexico	7:17.66	NR
5	2	Juan Morales (1:51.92); David Arias (1:54.48); Sebastián Camacho (1:52.51); Santiago Corredor (1:52.98)	Colombia	7:31.89	
6	1	Eduardo Cisternas (1:50.88); Vicente Villanueva (1:57.16); Mariano Lazzerini (1:52.64); Elías Ardiles (1:55.61)	Chile	7:36.29	
7	7	Emil Perez (1:56.52); Jorge Otaiza (1:54.32); Eric Veit (1:57.97); Wisnton Rodriguez (1:53.23)	Venezuela	7:42.04	
