= Bahamas at the 1995 Pan American Games =

- IOC code: BAH
- NOC: Bahamas Olympic Association

in Mar del Plata 11–26 March 1995
- Medals Ranked 20th: Gold 0 Silver 2 Bronze 1 Total 3

Pan American Games appearances (overview)
- 1955; 1959; 1963; 1967; 1971; 1975; 1979; 1983; 1987; 1991; 1995; 1999; 2003; 2007; 2011; 2015; 2019; 2023

The 12th Pan American Games were held in Mar del Plata, Argentina from March 11 to March 26, 1995.

== Medals ==
=== Silver ===
===== Athletics =====
- Men's 200 metres: Andrew Tynes
- Women's Javelin: Laverne Eve

=== Bronze ===
===== Athletics =====
- Women's Long Jump: Jackie Edwards

== See also ==
- Bahamas at the 1996 Summer Olympics
