= George William Kelly Roberts =

Bahamian politician and sports administrator (born 1906)

Sir George W. K. Roberts
- Born: George William Kelly Roberts; 19 July 1906; Harbour Island, Eleuthera, Bahamas
- Died: 24 June 1964 (aged 57); Nassau, New Providence, Bahamas
- Notable work: First President of the Bahamas Olympic Committee

Sir George W. K. Roberts (George William Kelly Roberts; 19 July 1906 – 24 June 1964) was a Bahamian lumber and shipping executive and politician. He served as president of the Senate of the Bahamas until his death in 1964. He was the first president of the Bahamas Olympic Committee.

== Biography ==
George William Kelly Roberts was born on 19 July 1906 in Harbour Island. He was the second child of George Campbell Roberts, a mariner, and Nellie Maud Kelly. The family had long roots in the Bahamas. One of his ancestors, John Roberts, was elected to the first House of Assembly of the Bahamas in 1729.

=== Career ===
In the 1920s, he managed the Nassau City Lumber Yard, which carried one of the largest stocks of imported lumber in the Bahamas.

From 1921 to 1932, Roberts was the Nassau Harbour Master.

In 1935, Roberts ran in his first election for a seat in the Bahamas Legislature and was elected a Member of the House of Assembly.

He served as a member of the House of Assembly from 4 April 1935 to 13 January 1955, and as a member of the Executive Council from 1 June 1946 to 22 July 1954. Roberts was a leader of the government in the House from 1949 to 1954 and president of the Legislative Council in 1954. In 1951, when musician and politician Bert Cambridge presented a petition in the House of Assembly calling for laws to prohibit discrimination "on the grounds of colour", Roberts was one of the few Bay Street representatives who voted in its support. He was made a Knight Bachelor in the 1958 New Year Honours for public services in the Bahamas. Sir Roberts was the first president of the Senate from 7 January 1964 to 24 June 1964.

In 1952, Roberts became the first president of the Bahamas Olympic Committee. He served until 1957 and was succeeded by Robert Symonette.

In 1959, Sir Roberts became President of the Bahamas Historical Society.

=== Personal life ===
Roberts married Freda Genevieve Sawyer on 7 January 1929 at Trinity Wesleyan Church in Nassau. The couple had three sons, Richard Campbell, Gary William and Noel Sawye. In 1953, Roberts, then president of the Legislative Council, moved his family from Bay Street to a new mansion that he had built on a hilltop waterfront site on the Eastern Road.

Sir George Roberts died on 24 June 1964 at age 57 in Nassau. He collapsed from what was believed to be a heart attack while addressing the Nassau Methodist Synod. The Harbour Island Library was named in his honour in 1968.

== Literature ==
- Bethell, A. Talbot (1937). The Early Settlers of the Bahamas and Colonists of North America. Clearfield Company. p. 113–207.
- Saunders, Gail (2017). Race and Class in the Colonial Bahamas, 1880-1960. University Press of Florida. ISBN 9780813064512.
- Journal of the Bahamas Historical Society, vol. 13-20. The Society. 1991.
