= Bahamas at the 2007 Pan American Games =

- IOC code: BAH
- NOC: Bahamas Olympic Association

in Rio de Janeiro 13–29 July 2007
- Flag bearer: Jeremy Knowles
- Medals Ranked 15th: Gold 2 Silver 2 Bronze 3 Total 7

Pan American Games appearances (overview)
- 1955; 1959; 1963; 1967; 1971; 1975; 1979; 1983; 1987; 1991; 1995; 1999; 2003; 2007; 2011; 2015; 2019; 2023

The 15th Pan American Games were held in Rio de Janeiro, Brazil from July 13 to July 29, 2007.

== Medals ==
=== Gold ===
===== Athletics =====
- Men's 400 metres: Chris Brown
- Men's 4x400 metres Relay: Andrae Williams, Avard Moncur, Michael Matheau, and Chris Brown

=== Silver ===
===== Athletics =====
- Men's High Jump: Donald Thomas
- Women's 400 metres: Christine Amertil

=== Bronze ===
===== Athletics =====
- Women's 100 metres: Chandra Sturrup
- Women's Javelin: Laverne Eve

===== Swimming =====
- Women's 4 × 100 m medley relay: Alana Dillette, Alicia Lightbourne, Arianna Vanderpool, Nikia Deveaux

== See also ==
- Bahamas at the 2006 Commonwealth Games
- Bahamas at the 2008 Summer Olympics
