= Swimming at the 2011 Pan American Games – Women's 4 × 100 metre medley relay =

Women's 4 × 100 metre medley relay at the 2011 Pan American Games
- Venue: Scotiabank Aquatics Center
- Date: October 21 (preliminaries and finals)
- Winning score: 4:01.00

Medalists
Gold medal	Rachel Bootsma, Annie Chandler, Claire Donahue, Amanda Kendall, Elizabeth Pelton, Ashley Wanland, Elaine Breeden, Erika Erndl	United States
Silver medal	Ashley McGregor, Gabrielle Soucisse, Erin Miller, Jennifer Beckberger, Brenna MacLean, Kierra Smith, Samantha Corea, Caroline Lapierre	Canada
Bronze medal	Fabíola Molina, Tatiane Sakemi, Daynara de Paula, Tatiana Lemos	Brazil

The Women's 4×100 Medley Relay Swimming event at the XVI Pan American Games was swum on 21 October 2011 in Guadalajara, Mexico.

The defending champion in the event was the United States.

== Records ==
Prior to this competition, the existing world and Pan American Games records were as follows:

World record	China (CHN); Zhao Jing (58.98); Chen Huijia (1:04.12); Jiao Liuyang (56.28); Li Zhesi (52.81)	3:52.19	Rome, Italy	August 1, 2009
Pan American Games record	United States (USA); Julia Smit (1:01.94); Michelle McKeehan (1:08.59); Kathleen Hersey (58.57); Maritza Correia (55.50)	4:04.60	Rio de Janeiro, Brazil	July 22, 2007

== Results ==
Key: q= qualified for finals; GR= Games Record; NR= national record.

=== Preliminary heats ===
Rank	Heat/Lane	Nation	Swimmers	Time	Notes
1	H2 L4	United States	Elizabeth Pelton (1:00.71); Ashley Wanland (1:09.15); Elaine Breeden (59.88); Erika Erndl (54.78)	4:04.52	Q, GR
2	H1 L5	Brazil	Fabíola Molina (1:02.93); Tatiane Sakemi (1:13.75); Daynara de Paula (1:00.60); Tatiana Lemos (58.25)	4:15.53	Q
3	H1 L4	Canada	Samantha Corea (1:04.11); Kierra Smith (1:11.46); Brenna MacLean (1:02.85); Caroline Lapierre (57.31)	4:15.73	Q
4	H2 L5	Mexico	Lourdes Villaseñor (1:05.62); Melissa Rodríguez (1:11.83); Rita Medrano (1:02.75); Liliana Ibáñez (59.12)	4:19.32	Q
5	H2 L3	Venezuela	Elimar Barrios (1:06.65); Mercedes Toledo (1:12.45); Eliana Barrios (1:03.68); Wendy Rodriguez (58.07)	4:20.85	Q
6	H2 L6	Bahamas	Alana Dillette (1:04.48); Alicia Lightbourne (1:14.56); Mckayla Lightbourn (1:04.83); Ariel Weech (59.17)	4:23.04	Q
7	H1 L3	Argentina	Florencia Perotti (1:05.23); Julia Sebastian (1:13.42); Georgina Bardach (1:06.65); Nadia Colovini (1:02.13)	4:27.43	Q
8	H1 L6	Puerto Rico	Alana Berrocal (1:06.08); Patricia Casellas (1:15.92); Debra Rodriguez (1:08.72); Barbara Caraballo (1:03.93)	4:34.65	Q
9	H2 L2	Peru	Andrea Cedron (1:10.71); Patricia Quevedo (1:19.55); Daniela Kaori Miyahara (1:09.39); Mariangela Macchiavello (59.62)	4:39.27	

=== Final ===
Rank	Lane	Nation	Swimmers	Time	Notes
1st place, gold medalist(s)	4	United States	Rachel Bootsma (1:00.46); Annie Chandler (1:07.59); Claire Donahue (59.03); Amanda Kendall (53.92)	4:01.00	GR
2nd place, silver medalist(s)	5	Canada	Gabrielle Soucisse (1:02.70); Ashley McGregor (1:08.80); Erin Miller (1:00.32); Jennifer Beckberger (55.22)	4:07.04	
3rd place, bronze medalist(s)	6	Brazil	Fabíola Molina (1:01.07); Tatiane Sakemi (1:11.40); Daynara de Paula (59.32); Tatiana Lemos (55.33)	4:07.12	
4	7	Mexico	Fernanda González (1:01.83); Arantxa Medina (1:11.00); Rita Medrano (1:00.29); Liliana Ibáñez (56.29)	4:09.41	
5	3	Argentina	Florencia Perotti (1:04.88); Julia Sebastian (1:11.44); Cecilia Bertoncello (1:06.17); Nadia Colovini (53.69)	4:16.18	
6	1	Bahamas	McKayla Lightbourn (1:03.95); Alicia Lightbourne (1:13.54); Alana Dillete (1:01.36); Ariel Weech (58.12)	4:16.97	
7	8	Venezuela	Jeserik Pinto (1:05.48); Daniela Victoria (1:13.47); Erika Torellas (1:02.13); Arlene Semeco (57.68)	4:18.76	
8	2	Puerto Rico	Alana Berrocal (1:06.13); Trysha Centeno (1:12.27); Barbara Caraballo (1:05.02); Debra Rodriguez (59.74)	4:23.16	
