= Swimming at the 2011 Pan American Games – Women's 100 metre breaststroke =

Women's 100 metre breaststroke at the 2011 Pan American Games
- Venue: Scotiabank Aquatics Center
- Dates: October 17 (preliminaries and finals)

Medalists
Gold medal	Annie Chandler	United States
Silver medal	Ashley Wanland	United States
Bronze medal	Ashley McGregor	Canada

The women's 100 metre breaststroke competition of the swimming events at the 2011 Pan American Games took place on October 17, at the Scotiabank Aquatics Center in the municipality of Zapopan, near Guadalajara, Mexico. The defending Pan American Games champion was Michelle McKeehan of the United States.

This race consisted of two lengths of the pool, both lengths being in breaststroke.

== Records ==
Prior to this competition, the existing world and Pan American Games records were as follows:

World record	Jessica Hardy (USA)	1:04.45	Federal Way, United States	August 7, 2009
Pan American Games record	Annamay Pierse (CAN)	1:07.78	Rio de Janeiro, Brazil	July 17, 2007

== Qualification ==
Each National Olympic Committee (NOC) was able to enter up to two entrants, providing they had met the A standard (1:13.3) in the qualifying period (January 1, 2010 to September 4, 2011). NOCs were also permitted to enter one athlete providing they had met the B standard (1:15.5) in the same qualifying period.

== Results ==
All times are in minutes and seconds.

KEY:	q	Fastest non-qualifiers	Q	Qualified	NR	National record	PB	Personal best	SB	Seasonal best

=== Heats ===
The first round was held on October 17.

Rank	Heat	Lane	Name	Nationality	Time	Notes
1	3	5	Ashley McGregor	Canada	1:09.24	QA
2	2	4	Ashley Wanland	United States	1:09.26	QA
3	2	5	Alia Atkinson	Jamaica	1:09.28	QA
4	3	4	Annie Chandler	United States	1:09.57	QA
5	1	4	Kierra Smith	Canada	1:10.15	QA
6	2	3	Tatiane Sakemi	Brazil	1:12.06	QA
7	3	3	Arantxa Medina	Mexico	1:12.79	QA
8	3	6	Julia Sebastian	Argentina	1:12.88	QA
9	1	7	Trysha Centeno	Puerto Rico	1:13.04	QB
10	3	2	Daniela Victoria	Venezuela	1:13.17	QB
11	1	6	Mercedes Toledo	Venezuela	1:13.20	QB
12	1	3	Danielle Beaubrun	Saint Lucia	1:13.29	QB
13	2	6	Monica Alvarez	Colombia	1:13.36	QB
14	1	5	Carolina Mussi	Brazil	1:13.75	QB
15	2	1	Isabel Riquelme	Chile	1:13.76	QB
16	3	1	Lisa Blackburn	Bermuda	1:14.33	QB
17	1	2	Mijal Asis	Argentina	1:14.71	
18	2	7	Patricia Casellas	Puerto Rico	1:15.56	
19	3	7	Alicia Lightbourne	Bahamas	1:15.66	
20	2	2	McKayla Lightbourne	Bahamas	1:15.95	

=== B Final ===
The B final was also held on October 17.

Rank	Lane	Name	Nationality	Time	Notes
9	6	Danielle Beaubrun	Saint Lucia	1:10.63	
10	2	Monica Alvarez	Colombia	1:12.25	
11	5	Daniela Victoria	Venezuela	1:12.31	
12	3	Mercedes Toledo	Venezuela	1:12.54	
13	4	Trysha Centeno	Puerto Rico	1:12.87	
14	1	Isabel Riquelme	Chile	1:13.99	
15	8	Lisa Blackburn	Bermuda	1:14.75	
16	7	Carolina Mussi	Brazil	1:15.63	

=== A Final ===
The A final was also held on October 17.

Rank	Lane	Name	Nationality	Time	Notes
1st place, gold medalist(s)	6	Annie Chandler	United States	1:07.90	
2nd place, silver medalist(s)	5	Ashley Wanland	United States	1:08.55	
3rd place, bronze medalist(s)	4	Ashley McGregor	Canada	1:08.96	
4	3	Alia Atkinson	Jamaica	1:09.11	
5	2	Kierra Smith	Canada	1:10.23	
6	7	Tatiane Sakemi	Brazil	1:11.46	
7	1	Arantxa Medina	Mexico	1:12.29	
8	8	Julia Sebastian	Argentina	1:12.60	
