= Swimming at the 2015 Pan American Games – Women's 50 metre freestyle =

Women's 50 metre freestyle at the 2015 Pan American Games
- Venue: CIBC Pan Am/Parapan Am Aquatics Centre and Field House
- Dates: July 17 (preliminaries and finals)
- Competitors: 27 from 23 nations
- Winning time: 24.38

Medalists
Gold medal	Arianna Vanderpool-Wallace	Bahamas
Silver medal	Etiene Medeiros	Brazil
Bronze medal	Natalie Coughlin	United States

The women's 50 metre freestyle competition of the swimming events at the 2015 Pan American Games took place on July 17 at the CIBC Pan Am/Parapan Am Aquatics Centre and Field House in Toronto, Canada. The defending Pan American Games champion was Lara Jackson of the United States.

This race consisted of one length of the pool in freestyle. The top eight swimmers from the heats would qualify for the A final (where the medals would be awarded), while the next best eight swimmers would qualify for the B final.

== Records ==
Prior to this competition, the existing world and Pan American Games records were as follows:

World record	Britta Steffen (GER)	23.73	Rome, Italy	August 2, 2009
Pan American Games record	Lara Jackson (USA)	25.09	Guadalajara, Mexico	October 21, 2011

The following new records were set during this competition.

Date	Event	Name	Nationality	Time	Record
17 July	Heats 2	Etiene Medeiros	Brazil	24.75	GR
17 July	Heats 4	Arianna Vanderpool-Wallace	Bahamas	24.31	GR

== Qualification ==
Each National Olympic Committee (NOC) was able to enter up to two entrants providing they had met the A standard (26.05) in the qualifying period (January 1, 2014 to May 1, 2015). NOCs were also permitted to enter one athlete providing they had met the B standard (27.61) in the same qualifying period. All other competing athletes were entered as universality spots.

== Schedule ==
All times are Eastern Time Zone (UTC-4).

Date	Time	Round
July 17, 2015	11:32	Heats
July 17, 2015	21:04	Final B
July 17, 2015	21:08	Final A

== Results ==
KEY:	q	Fastest non-qualifiers	Q	Qualified	GR	Games record	NR	National record	PB	Personal best	SB	Seasonal best

=== Heats ===
The first round was held on July 17.

Rank	Heat	Lane	Name	Nationality	Time	Notes
1	4	4	Arianna Vanderpool-Wallace	Bahamas	24.31	QA, GR
2	2	4	Etiene Medeiros	Brazil	24.75	QA
2	4	5	Madison Kennedy	United States	24.75	QA
4	3	5	Graciele Herrmann	Brazil	24.97	QA
5	3	4	Chantal van Landeghem	Canada	24.99	QA
6	2	5	Natalie Coughlin	United States	25.07	QA
6	4	3	Michelle Williams	Canada	25.07	QA
8	3	3	Vanessa García	Puerto Rico	25.37	QA
9	4	6	Liliana Ibáñez	Mexico	25.46	QB
10	2	2	Chinyere Pigot	Suriname	25.76	QB
11	3	6	Arlene Semeco	Venezuela	25.83	QB
12	4	2	Isabella Arcila	Colombia	25.89	QB
13	3	2	Karen Torrez	Bolivia	26.01	QB
14	4	7	Aixa Triay	Argentina	26.03	QB
15	2	6	Allyson Ponson	Aruba	26.22	QB
16	2	3	Ariel Weech	Bahamas	26.32	QB
17	2	7	Elisbet Gamez	Cuba	26.39	
18	3	7	Loren Bahamonde	Ecuador	26.70	
19	4	8	Marie Meza	Costa Rica	26.74	
20	4	1	Karen Riveros	Paraguay	27.17	
21	3	1	Elinah Phillip	British Virgin Islands	27.37	
22	3	8	Dalia Torrez	Nicaragua	27.80	
23	1	4	Jamaris Washshah	Virgin Islands	27.87	
24	1	3	Samantha Roberts	Antigua and Barbuda	27.91	
25	1	5	Trudian Patrick	Jamaica	27.99	
26	2	8	Oreoluwa Cherebin	Grenada	28.28	
27	1	6	Onika George	Guyana	29.03	
	2	1	Izzy Shne Joachim	Saint Vincent and the Grenadines	DNS	

=== B Final ===
The B final was also held on July 17.

Rank	Lane	Name	Nationality	Time	Notes
9	4	Liliana Ibáñez	Mexico	25.48	
10	5	Chinyere Pigot	Suriname	25.79	
10	3	Arlene Semeco	Venezuela	25.79	
12	6	Isabella Arcila	Colombia	25.82	
13	7	Aixa Triay	Argentina	26.00	NR
14	2	Karen Torrez	Bolivia	26.12	
15	8	Ariel Weech	Bahamas	26.28	
16	1	Allyson Ponson	Aruba	26.37	

=== A Final ===
The A final was also held on July 17. Vanderpool-Wallace was the first Bahamian swimmer to win a gold medal in the history of the Pan American games.

Rank	Lane	Name	Nationality	Time	Notes
1st place, gold medalist(s)	4	Arianna Vanderpool-Wallace	Bahamas	24.38	
2nd place, silver medalist(s)	5	Etiene Medeiros	Brazil	24.55	SA
3rd place, bronze medalist(s)	7	Natalie Coughlin	United States	24.66	
4	2	Chantal van Landeghem	Canada	24.70	
5	3	Madison Kennedy	United States	24.80	
6	1	Michelle Williams	Canada	24.91	
7	6	Graciele Herrmann	Brazil	24.94	
8	8	Vanessa García	Puerto Rico	25.21	
