= Swimming at the 2023 Pan American Games – Men's 200 metre backstroke =

Men's 200 metre backstroke at the 2023 Pan American Games
- Venue: Aquatic Center
- Date: October 25, 2023
- Competitors: 18 from 14 nations
- Winning time: 1:56.58

Medalists
Gold medal	Jack Aikins	United States
Silver medal	Ian Grum	United States
Bronze medal	Hugh McNeill	Canada

The men's 200 metre backstroke competition of the swimming events at the 2023 Pan American Games were held on October 25, 2023, at the Aquatic Center in Santiago, Chile.

== Records ==
World record	Aaron Perisol (USA)	1:51.92	Rome, Italy	July 31, 2009
Pan American Games record	Sean Lehane (USA)	1:57.11	Toronto, Canada	July 15, 2015

== Results ==
KEY:	QA	Qualified for A final	QB	Qualified for B final	GR	Games record	NR	National record	PB	Personal best	SB	Seasonal best

=== Heats ===
The first round was held on October 25.

Rank	Heat	Lane	Name	Nationality	Time	Notes
1	2	4	Ian Grum	United States	1:59.21	QA
2	3	4	Jack Aikins	United States	1:59.28	QA
3	2	5	Yeziel Morales	Puerto Rico	2:00.39	QA
4	3	5	Raben Dommann	Canada	2:00.97	QA
5	1	4	Hugh McNeill	Canada	2:01.76	QA
6	1	5	Leonardo de Deus	Brazil	2:01.79	QA
7	2	3	Omar Pinzón	Colombia	2:01.92	QA
8	1	3	Brandonn Almeida	Brazil	2:02.45	QA
9	3	3	Patrick Groters	Aruba	2:04.50	QB
10	2	6	Tomás Di Paolo	Argentina	2:04.86	QB
11	1	2	Jack Harvey	Bermuda	2:05.13	QB
12	3	2	Valentín Costantino	Argentina	2:05.66	QB
13	1	6	Matías López	Paraguay	2:05.75	QB
14	3	7	Edhy Vargas	Chile	2:06.28	QB
15	3	6	Diego Camacho	Mexico	2:06.54	QB
16	2	7	Maximillian Wilson	Virgin Islands	2:09.47	QB
17	2	2	Guido Montero	Costa Rica	2:10.82	
18	1	7	Miguel Turcios	Independent Athletes Team	2:14.62	

=== Final B ===
The B final was also held on October 25.

Rank	Lane	Name	Nationality	Time	Notes
9	4	Patrick Groters	Aruba	2:02.83	
10	6	Valentín Costantino	Argentina	2:03.93	
11	5	Tomás Di Paolo	Argentina	2:04.00	
12	3	Jack Harvey	Bermuda	2:04.57	
13	7	Edhy Vargas	Chile	2:05.40	
14	1	Diego Camacho	Mexico	2:05.60	
15	2	Matías López	Paraguay	2:06.15	
16	8	Maximillian Wilson	Virgin Islands	2:10.67	

=== Final A ===
The A final was also held on October 25.

Rank	Lane	Name	Nationality	Time	Notes
1st place, gold medalist(s)	5	Jack Aikins	United States	1:56.58	PR
2nd place, silver medalist(s)	4	Ian Grum	United States	1:57.19	
3rd place, bronze medalist(s)	2	Hugh McNeill	Canada	1:59.96	
4	3	Yeziel Morales	Puerto Rico	2:00.23	
5	1	Omar Pinzón	Colombia	2:01.42	
6	8	Brandonn Almeida	Brazil	2:01.56	
7	7	Leonardo de Deus	Brazil	2:01.66	
8	6	Raben Dommann	Canada	2:03.52	
