= Wellington Miller =

Bahamian sports administrator (born 1953)

- Born: 12 October 1953 (age 72)
- Occupation: Sports administrator
- Years active: 1984–present
- Known for: President of the Bahamas Olympic Committee (2008–2017)

Wellington Miller (born 12 October 1953) is a Bahamian sports administrator and civil servant. He served as president of the Bahamas Olympic Committee (BOC) from 2008 to 2017. He has also held senior roles in Bahamian amateur boxing administration. His terms in both bodies were marked by multiple compliance violations.

== Career ==
Early in his career, Miller worked as a customs and immigration officer.

=== Boxing ===
Miller is often described as a prominent amateur boxer who later served as an amateur boxing administrator for 25 years. He was first elected president of the Amateur Boxing Association of the Bahamas in 1984 and served until 2000; he later returned as president in 2004 and served until 2017.

In 2018, the Amateur Boxing Association of the Bahamas faced suspension from the International Boxing Association (AIBA) due to multiple violations committed over 10 years during Miller's last two terms as president. No audited accounts or financial reports had been tabled during that period. AIBA also found violations in the electoral process: while several leaders of legally established associations were denied the right to vote, seven of the eleven associations were established immediately before the elections.

=== Bahamas Olympic Committee ===
From 2000 to 2008, Miller served as a vice-president of the Bahamas Olympic Committee under Sir Arlington Butler. Butler, nicknamed "Mr. Olympics" in the Bahamas, served for several decades and was a key figure in the development of the BOC. However, his final years in office were marked by tensions with the rest of the executive team, including Miller. When the 2008 elections were scheduled, the situation was so complicated that the International Olympic Committee stepped in to broker talks and monitor the election process.

Miller was elected President in 2008, but the early years of his term were marked by internal opposition. He was openly opposed by a group of executives and criticized for weak leadership. Cora Hepburn (elected vice-president in 2013) said that no financial report had been tabled between 2008 and 2012. In 2012, the BOC constitution was amended, introducing a two-term limit for the top executive posts. In 2013, Miller was re-elected President.

Miller served two full four-year terms and sought a third term. Speaking to The Nassau Guardian, he expressed confidence in winning, stating that "the new provisions [of the amended constitution] would begin from the time that the amendment came into being". He withdrew after an opposition group, represented by lawyer Wayne Munroe, threatened court action. In the end, Miller left office in 2017; Romell Knowles was elected the new president of the Bahamas Olympic Committee, and Derron Donaldson was elected Secretary General.

=== Further career ===
Miller worked for the Pan American Sports Organization and served on technical committees, including in cycling.

In 2025, he initiated the launch of the Bahamas World Boxing Federation. The body positioned itself in opposition to the Amateur Boxing Association of the Bahamas, which Miller had led for 16 years. The move was questioned by some observers, who argued that two practically identical bodies could confuse athletes and dilute resources.
