= Swimming at the 2011 Pan American Games – Women's 100 metre freestyle =

Women's 100 metre freestyle at the 2011 Pan American Games
- Venue: Scotiabank Aquatics Center
- Dates: October 19 (preliminaries and finals)
- Competitors: 21 from 16 nations

Medalists
Gold medal	Amanda Kendall	United States
Silver medal	Erika Erndl	United States
Bronze medal	Arlene Semeco	Venezuela

The Women's 100 metre freestyle swimming event at the 2011 Pan American Games was held on October 19, 2011, in Guadalajara, Mexico. The defending Pan American Games champion was Arlene Semeco of Venezuela.

This race consisted of two lengths of the pool, both in freestyle.

== Records ==
Prior to this competition, the existing world and Pan American Games records were as follows:

World Record	Britta Steffen (GER)	52.07	Rome, Italy	July 31, 2009
Games Record	Amanda Weir (USA)	54.46	Santo Domingo, Dominican Republic	August 11, 2003

== Qualification ==
Each National Olympic Committee (NOC) was able to enter up to two entrants providing they had met the A standard (57.6) in the qualifying period (January 1, 2010 to September 4, 2011). NOCs were also permitted to enter one athlete providing they had met the B standard (59.3) in the same qualifying period.

== Results ==
All times are in minutes and seconds.

KEY:	q	Fastest non-qualifiers	Q	Qualified	GR	Games record	NR	National record	PB	Personal best	SB	Seasonal best

=== Heats ===
The first round was held on October 19.

Rank	Heat	Lane	Name	Nationality	Time	Notes
1	1	4	Amanda Kendall	United States	54.82	QA
2	2	4	Vanessa García	Puerto Rico	55.73	QA
3	3	5	Erika Erndl	United States	55.98	QA
4	2	5	Jennifer Beckberger	Canada	56.15	QA
5	3	4	Tatiana Barbosa	Brazil	56.47	QA
6	2	6	Nadia Colovini	Argentina	56.66	QA
7	3	3	Arlene Semeco	Venezuela	56.69	QA
8	1	3	Liliana Ibáñez	Mexico	56.83	QA
9	1	5	Daynara de Paula	Brazil	57.14	QB
10	2	3	Caroline Lapierre	Canada	57.43	QB
11	1	2	Ariel Weech	Bahamas	57.97	QB
12	1	6	Wendy Rodriguez	Venezuela	58.14	QB
13	2	2	Karen Torrez	Bolivia	58.81	QB
14	3	6	Chinyere Pigot	Suriname	58.95	QB
15	1	7	Allyson Ponson	Aruba	59.59	QB
16	3	7	Karen Riveros	Paraguay	1:00.11	QB
17	3	1	Julimar Avila	Honduras	1:00.15	
18	2	1	Marie Meza Peraza	Costa Rica	1:01.13	
19	1	1	Britany van Lange	Guyana	1:02.28	
	3	2	Fernanda González	Mexico		DNS
	2	7	Kendese Nangle	Jamaica		DNS

=== B Final ===
The B final was also held on October 19.

Rank	Lane	Name	Nationality	Time	Notes
9	5	Ariel Weech	Bahamas	57.58	
10	4	Caroline Lapierre	Canada	57.70	
11	3	Wendy Rodriguez	Venezuela	58.03	
12	6	Karen Torrez	Bolivia	58.84	
13	2	Chinyere Pigot	Suriname	59.03	
14	7	Allyson Ponson	Aruba	59.16	
15	1	Karen Riveros	Paraguay	59.96	
16	8	Julimar Avila	Honduras	1:00.51	

=== A Final ===
The A final was also held on October 19.

Place	Lane	Swimmer	Nation	Time	Notes
1st place, gold medalist(s)	4	Amanda Kendall	United States	54.75	
2nd place, silver medalist(s)	3	Erika Erndl	United States	55.04	
3rd place, bronze medalist(s)	1	Arlene Semeco	Venezuela	55.43	
4	5	Vanessa García	Puerto Rico	55.55	
5	6	Jennifer Beckberger	Canada	55.68	
6	8	Liliana Ibáñez	Mexico	55.74	NR
7	2	Tatiana Barbosa	Brazil	56.36	
8	7	Nadia Colovini	Argentina	56.53	
