= Annie Chandler (swimmer) =

American swimmer

Personal information
- Full name: Annie Chandler Grevers
- Nationality: United States
- Born: August 21, 1987 (age 38) San Antonio, Texas, U.S.
- Spouse: Matt Grevers

Sport
- Sport: Swimming
- Strokes: Breaststroke, freestyle
- College team: University of Arizona
- Coach: Frank Busch (Arizona)
Medal record
Women's swimming
Representing the United States
Pan American Games
Gold medal – first place	2011 Guadalajara	100 m breaststroke
Gold medal – first place	2011 Guadalajara	4×100 m medley
World University Games
Gold medal – first place	2011 Shenzhen	50 m breaststroke
Silver medal – second place	2011 Shenzhen	4×100 m medley

Annie Chandler Grevers (born August 21, 1987) known as Annie Chandler prior to her marriage in 2013, is an American former competitive swimmer who specialized in breaststroke events and was a two-time Pan American Games gold medalist as well as a World University Games gold medalist. Chandler is a former member of the United States National Team.

== Early life and family ==
Chandler was born on August 21, 1987 to Barbara and Thomas Chandler in San Antonio, Texas, where she attended Winston Churchill High School and swam for Churchill High swim team Coach Al Marks. She came from an athletic family, as her father Tom played football in the NFL, Canadian Football League, and the World Football League. Her cousin, Scott Chandler, is a former NFL tight end for the New England Patriots. She has three brothers Corey, Ben, and Luke.

=== Swimming for Churchill High ===
Representing Churchill High at the age of 15, at the UIL 5A Texas State Swimming and Diving Championship in Austin on Saturday, February 15, 2003, she placed seventh in the 50 freestyle, swimming a 24.44, while her freestyle relay team, where she swam second, placed first with a combined time of 1:35.77. Showing improvement the following year at the UIL State 5A Swimming and Diving Meet while again representing Churchill High on February 21, 2004, she placed first in the 100 breaststroke with a state record time of 1:01.63, swam as anchor on the winning 200 freestyle relay team that had a time of 1:36.50, and swam the breaststroke (third) leg for the second place 200 medley relay team that had a combined time of 1:47.03.

In a banner year at 17, on February 6, 2005, at the 5A UIL State Championships in Austin, Chandler again placed first in the 100 breaststroke with a record time of 1:01.27, swam anchor on the second place 400 freestyle relay team that had a combined time of 3:28.73, placed fifth in the 50 freestyle with a 24.11, and again swam on the winning 200 freestyle relay team that set a time of 1:36.50. Chandler's participation helped lead Churchill High to the 2005 Texas State Team Championship. In February 2006, at the 5A State Championship in Austin, Chandler had a second place finish in the 50 freestyle with a time of 23.60, and another first place finish in the 100 breaststroke with a time of 1:01.59.

At San Antonio's Churchill High, Chandler was a three-time state title winner in the 100 breaststroke. At a high point in her Junior year, she set a state record for the 100 breaststroke and helped lead Churchill High to the team championship at the Texas State championships in February 2005. For these efforts and her college achievements, she was inducted in the San Antonio Sports Hall of Fame in February 2019.

== University of Arizona ==
Chandler swam for the University of Arizona for four years from 2006-2010, where she was coached by Men and Women's Head swimming coach Frank Busch. While with Arizona, she took home an individual NCAA Championship in the 100-yard breaststroke, six NCAA relay championships, seven individual All-America honors, a team Pac-12 championship, and two Pac-10 All-Academic honors. She was also critical to the success of the 2008 Arizona squad that took an NCAA National Championship.

As a freshman at the 2007 NCAA Swimming and Diving Championships, she placed second in the 100-yard and fourteenth in the 200-yard breast. Both her 200-yard and 400-yard medley relay teams came in first place. In her sophomore year, her 200-yard medley relay placed first as did her 400-yard medley relay team. Individually, she came in third in the 100-yard breast and eighth in the 200-yard breast. Junior year, she placed 4th in the 100 breast, seventh in the 200 breast, and again placed first in the 400-yard medley relay. In her senior year in 2010, Chandler placed first in the 100 breast and third in the 200 breast.

=== International competition ===
In Chandler's first Olympic Trials in 2008, she placed fifth in the 100 breast and seventeenth in the 200 breast. In 2010, Chandler placed second in the 100m breaststroke at the 2010 U.S. Summer Nationals, which qualified her for the 2010 Pan Pacific Championships and for the 2011 World University Games.

At the 2010 Pan Pacific Championships, Chandler placed fourth in the 50m breast. At the World University Games in 2011, she won a gold medal in the 50m breast and silver in the 4 × 100 m medley relay. Swimming in the 2011 Pan American Games, Chandler won the 100 m breaststroke with a time of 1:07.90 and the 4 × 100 m medley relay with a time of 4:01.00, which was a new Pan American Games record. At her second Olympic Trials in 2012, she placed 5th again in the 100 breast and 19th in the 50 free.

In her swimming career, she captured three state titles in the 100 breaststroke at Churchill High School, at the University of Arizona captured seven NCAA titles, and won two gold medals at the World University Games. A onetime U.S. National Swimming Team standout, she competed in the 2008 and 2010 Olympic Trials.

=== Marriage ===
She married six-time Olympic medalist Matt Grevers, on April 6, 2013 in San Antonio. He proposed to her on the podium at the Missouri Grand Prix on February 11, 2012. He postponed their honeymoon to swim in the fourth of six grand prix meets because he missed several practices in the week before their wedding.

As of 2024, she and husband Matt Grevers lived in Tucson, Arizona, and had three children under the age of 10. Matt, who continued to train and planned to enter the Olympic trials that year, was an Assistant volunteer coach at the University of Arizona, and worked and co-owned the DeMont Family Swim School, with his former coach Rick DeMont.

== Accolades ==
In 2020, she was inducted into the University of Arizona Sports Hall of Fame.
