= Bahamas at the Pan American Games =

- IOC code: BAH
- NOC: Bahamas Olympic Association
- Medals Ranked 18th: Gold 9 Silver 14 Bronze 13 Total 36

Pan American Games appearances (overview)
- 1955; 1959; 1963; 1967; 1971; 1975; 1979; 1983; 1987; 1991; 1995; 1999; 2003; 2007; 2011; 2015; 2019; 2023

The Bahamas has competed at every edition of the Pan American Games since the second edition of the multi-sport event in 1955. Bahamas did not compete at the first and only Pan American Winter Games in 1990.

== Pan American Games ==
=== Medals by games ===
To sort the tables by host city, total medal count, or any other column, click on the icon next to the column title.

Year	Ref.	Edition	Host city	Rank	Gold	Silver	Bronze	Total
1951		I	(Argentina) Buenos Aires	Did not participate				
1955		II	Mexico City	—	0	0	0	0
1959		III	(United States) Chicago	9th	2	0	0	2
1963		IV	(Brazil) São Paulo	—	0	0	0	0
1967		V	(Canada) Winnipeg	—	0	0	0	0
1971		VI	(Colombia) Cali	—	0	0	0	0
1975		VII	Mexico City	—	0	0	0	0
1979		VIII	(Puerto Rico) San Juan	16th	0	1	0	1
1983		IX	(Venezuela) Caracas	16th	0	1	0	1
1987		X	(United States) Indianapolis	18th	0	2	3	5
1991		XI	(Cuba) Havana	18th	0	1	1	2
1995		XII	(Argentina) Mar del Plata	20th	0	2	1	3
1999		XIII	(Canada) Winnipeg	11th	2	0	1	3
2003		XIV	(Dominican Republic) Santo Domingo	19th	0	2	0	2
2007		XV	(Brazil) Rio de Janeiro	15th	2	2	3	7
2011		XVI	(Mexico) Guadalajara	15th	1	1	1	3
2015		XVII	(Canada) Toronto	24th	2	2	2	6
2019		XVIII	(Peru) Lima	30th	0	0	1	1
2023		XIX	(Chile) Santiago	25th	0	1	2	3
Total				18th	9	15	15	39

== Winter Pan American Games ==
=== Medals by games ===
Year	Ref.	Edition	Host city	Rank	Gold	Silver	Bronze	Total
1990		I	(Argentina) Las Leñas	Did not participate				
Total				—	0	0	0	0

== Junior Pan American Games ==
=== Medals by games ===
Games	Gold	Silver	Bronze	Total	Rank
(Colombia) 2021 Cali-Valle	0	0	1	1	28th
(Paraguay) 2025 Asunción	Future event				
Total	0	0	1	1	28th

=== Medals by sport ===
Sport	Gold	Silver	Bronze	Total
Athletics	0	0	1	1
Totals (1 entries)	0	0	1	1

=== Medalists ===
Medal	Name	Games	Sport	Event
Bronze	Kyle Alcine	2021 Cali-Valle	Athletics	Men's high jump
