= Swimming at the 2023 Pan American Games – Men's 4 × 100 metre medley relay =

Men's 4 × 100 metre medley relay at the 2023 Pan American Games
- Venue: Aquatic Centre
- Date: October 25
- Competitors: 83 from 12 nations

Medalists
Gold medal	Jack Aikins; Jacob Foster; Lukas Miller; Jonathan Kulow; Christopher O'Connor; Noah Nichols; Jack Dahlgren; Cody Carrozza	United States
Silver medal	Guilherme Basseto; João Gomes Júnior; Vinicius Lanza; Guilherme Caribé; Gabriel Fantoni; Raphael Windmuller; Victor Baganha; Victor Alcara	Brazil
Bronze medal	Blake Tierney; Gabe Mastromatteo; Finlay Knox; Javier Acevedo; Raben Dommann; Brayden Taivassalo; Keir Ogilvie; Edouard Fullum-Huot	Canada

The men's 4 × 100 metre medley relay competition of the swimming events at the 2023 Pan American Games were held on October 25, 2023, at the Aquatic Center in Santiago, Chile.

== Records ==
Prior to this competition, the existing world and Pan American Games records were as follows:

World record	Ryan Murphy (52.31); Michael Andrew (58.49); Caeleb Dressel (49.03); Zach Apple (46.95) (USA)	3:26.78	Tokyo, Japan	August 1, 2021
Pan American Games record	Daniel Carr (53.95); Nic Fink (58.57); Tom Shields (50.40); Nathan Adrian (47.33) (USA)	3:30.25	Lima, Peru	August 10, 2019

== Results ==
KEY:	QA	Qualified for A final	QB	Qualified for B final	GR	Games record	NR	National record	PB	Personal best	SB	Seasonal best

=== Heats ===
The highest eight scores advance to the final.

Rank	Heat	Lane	Name	Nationality	Time	Notes
1	2	4	Christopher O'Connor (55.38); Noah Nichols (59.91); Jack Dahlgren (52.34); Cody Carrozza (49.56)	United States	3:37.19	Q
2	2	5	Gabriel Fantoni (55.01); Raphael Windmuller (1:01.14); Victor Baganha (52.92); Victor Alcara (48.38)	Brazil	3:37.45	Q
3	1	4	Raben Dommann (55.09); Brayden Taivassalo (1:00.89); Keir Ogilvie (53.89); Edouard Fullum-Huot (49.40)	Canada	3:39.27	Q
4	2	3	Andy Xianyang (56.49); Andrés Puente (1:01.46); Jorga Iga (52.62); José Cano (51.65)	Mexico	3:42.22	Q
5	2	6	Anthony Rincón (56.37); Jorge Murillo (1:01.66); Esnaider Reales (54.16); Sebastián Camacho (52.88)	Colombia	3:45.07	Q
6	1	3	Augstín Hernández (57.55); Juan Bautista Carrocia (1:03.39); Federico Ludueña (54.90); Matías Santiso (50.88)	Argentina	3:46.72	Q
7	2	2	Edhy Vargas (57.92); Mariano Lazzerini (1:02.34); Benjamín Schnapp (54.62); Elías Ardiles (52.88)	Chile	3:47.76	Q
8	1	6	Diego Mas (1:00.72); Eric Veit (1:04.08); Jorge Otaiza (53.12); Emil Pérez (51.40)	Venezuela	3:49.32	Q
9	1	5	Erick Gordillo (58.41); Roberto Bonilla (1:02.91); Christopher Gossmann (56.92); Miguel Vásquez (51.40)	Independent Athletes Team	3:49.64	R
10	2	7	Lamar Taylor (56.90); Mark-Anthony Thompson (1:06.36); Emmanuel Gadson (56.97); Luke Thompson (53.69)	Bahamas	3:53.92	R
11	1	2	Carlos Cobos (58.20); Joaquín Vargas (1:15.78); Ricardo Espinosa (58.14); Rafael Ponce (53.11)	Peru	4:05.23	

=== Final ===
The final was held on October 25.

Rank	Lane	Name	Nationality	Time	Notes
1st place, gold medalist(s)	4	Jack Aikins (54.00); Jacob Foster (1:00.61); Lukas Miller (51.36); Jonathan Kulow (47.32)	United States	3:33.29	
2nd place, silver medalist(s)	5	Guilherme Basseto (54.70); João Gomes Júnior (1:00.45); Vinicius Lanza (53.03); Guilherme Caribé (46.94)	Brazil	3:35.12	
3rd place, bronze medalist(s)	3	Blake Tierney (54.57); Gabe Mastromatteo (1:00.20); Finlay Knox (52.96); Javier Acevedo (47.99)	Canada	3:35.72	
4	6	Diego Camacho (56.31); Miguel de Lara (1:00.18); Jorga Iga (52.46); Andrés Dupont (48.84)	Mexico	3:37.79	
5	2	Omar Pinzón (56.04); Jorge Murillo (1:00.78); David Arias (52.82); Juan Morales (50.27)	Colombia	3:39.91	NR
6	7	Ulises Saravia (55.19); Gabriel Morelli (1:02.50); Joaquín Piñero (54.88); Guido Buscaglia (49.14)	Argentina	3:41.71	
7	1	Edhy Vargas (57.18); Mariano Lazzerini (1:01.35); Benjamín Schnapp (53.82); Eduardo Cisternas (50.76)	Chile	3:43.11	
8	8	Winston Rodríguez (59.69); Eric Veit (1:03.92); Jorge Otaiza (52.96); Alberto Mestre (49.29)	Venezuela	3:45.86	
