= Yurieski Torreblanca =

Cuban freestyle wrestler

Personal information
- National team: Cuban
- Born: Yurieski Torreblanca Queralta; March 14, 1989 (age 37)

Sport
- Country: Cuba
- Sport: Amateur wrestling
- Weight class: 86 kg
- Event: Freestyle
Medal record
Men's freestyle wrestling
Representing Cuba
Pan American Games
Gold medal – first place	2019 Lima	86 kg
Gold medal – first place	2023 Santiago	86 kg
Pan American Wrestling Championships
Gold medal – first place	2015 Santiago	86 kg
Gold medal – first place	2017 Lauro de Freitas	86 kg
Gold medal – first place	2020 Ottawa	86 kg
Gold medal – first place	2023 Buenos Aires	86 kg
Silver medal – second place	2018 Lima	86 kg
Central American and Caribbean Games
Gold medal – first place	2018 Barranquilla	86 kg
Gold medal – first place	2023 San Salvador	86 kg

Yurieski Torreblanca Queralta (born March 14, 1989) is a Cuban freestyle wrestler who competes at 86 kilograms. A four-time Pan American Champion, Torreblanca won gold medals at the 2019 Pan American Games and the 2018 Central American and Caribbean Games.

== Career ==
At the 2017 Pan American Wrestling Championships in Lauro de Freitas, Brazil, he won the gold medal in the men's 86 kg event.

In 2018, he won the silver medal in the men's 86 kg event at the Pan American Wrestling Championships in Lima, Peru. At the 2018 Central American and Caribbean Games held in Barranquilla, Colombia, he won the gold medal in the men's 86 kg event. In 2019, he won the gold medal in the men's 86 kg event at the Pan American Games held in Lima, Peru.

He competed in the 86 kg event at the 2022 World Wrestling Championships held in Belgrade, Serbia.

In 2024, he competed at the Pan American Wrestling Olympic Qualification Tournament held in Acapulco, Mexico hoping to qualify for the 2024 Summer Olympics in Paris, France. He was eliminated in his first match.

== Achievements ==
Year	Tournament	Location	Result	Event
2018	Central American and Caribbean Games	Barranquilla, Colombia	1st	Freestyle 86 kg
2019	Pan American Games	Lima, Peru	1st	Freestyle 86 kg
2023	Central American and Caribbean Games	San Salvador, El Salvador	1st	Freestyle 86 kg
2023	Pan American Games	Santiago, Chile	1st	Freestyle 86 kg
