= Alex Axon =

Canadian swimmer (born 2003)

Personal information
- Full name: Alexander Axon
- Born: June 1, 2003 (age 23) Toronto, Ontario, Canada
- Height: 190.5 cm (6 ft 3 in)

Sport
- Country: Canada
- Sport: Swimming
- Strokes: Freestyle
Medal record
Men's swimming
Representing Canada
Pan American Games
Bronze medal – third place	2023 Santiago	4×200 m freestyle

Alexander Axon (born June 1, 2003) is a Canadian competitive swimmer, primarily competing in the long distance freestyle events.

== Career ==
In April 2023, Axon was named to Canada's 2023 Pan American Games team. At the games, Axon won a bronze medal in the 4 × 200 m freestyle relay.

At the conclusion of the 2024 Canadian Swim trials, Axon was named to Canada's 2024 Olympics team.

== Personal life ==
Axon attends Ohio State University, majoring in finance.
