= Alfonso Mestre =

Venezuelan swimmer (born 2001)

Personal information
- Born: 24 September 2001 (age 24) Caracas, Venezuela

Sport
- Country: Venezuela
- Sport: Swimming
- College team: University of Florida
Medal record
Men's swimming
Representing Venezuela
Pan American Games
Silver medal – second place	2023 Santiago	400 m freestyle
Silver medal – second place	2023 Santiago	800 m freestyle
Bronze medal – third place	2023 Santiago	1500 m freestyle
South American Games
Gold medal – first place	2022 Asuncion	200m freestyle
Silver medal – second place	2022 Asuncion	400m freestyle
Silver medal – second place	2022 Asuncion	800m freestyle
Silver medal – second place	2022 Asuncion	4x100m freestyle relay
Bronze medal – third place	2022 Asuncion	1500m freestyle
Bronze medal – third place	2022 Asuncion	4x200m freestyle relay

Alfonso Mestre (born 24 September 2001) is a Venezuelan swimmer. He competed in the 2020 Summer Olympics. He swam collegiately at the University of Florida.
