= Carlos Izquierdo (wrestler) =

Colombian freestyle wrestler

Personal information
- Full name: Carlos Arturo Izquierdo Méndez
- Born: 2 October 1997 (age 28) Buga, Valle del Cauca, Colombia

Sport
- Country: Colombia
- Style: Freestyle
Medal record
Representing Colombia
Men's freestyle wrestling
Event	1st	2nd	3rd
Pan American Games	0	0	1
Pan American Championships	0	1	3
CAC Games	0	3	0
Bolivarian Games	0	2	0
U20 Pan American Championships	0	1	0
Total	0	7	4
Pan American Games
Bronze medal – third place	2019 Lima	86 kg
Pan American Championships
Silver medal – second place	2016 Frisco	74 kg
Bronze medal – third place	2022 Acapulco	86 kg
Bronze medal – third place	2023 Buenos Aires	86 kg
Bronze medal – third place	2024 Acapulco	86 kg
Central American and Caribbean Games
Silver medal – second place	2018 Barranquilla	86 kg
Silver medal – second place	2023 San Salvador	86 kg
Silver medal – second place	2026 Santo Domingo	97 kg
Bolivarian Games
Silver medal – second place	2017 Santa Marta	86 kg
Silver medal – second place	2025 Lima-Ayacucho	97 kg
U20 Pan American Championships
Silver medal – second place	2017 Lima	84 kg

Carlos Arturo Izquierdo Méndez (Note: In this Spanish name, the first or paternal surname is Izquierdo and the second or maternal family name is Méndez.) (born 2 October 1997 in Buga, Valle del Cauca) is a Colombian freestyle wrestler. He competed in the men's freestyle 74 kg event at the 2016 Summer Olympics, in which he was eliminated in the round of 16 by Jabrayil Hasanov.

He represented Colombia at the 2020 Summer Olympics in the men's freestyle 86 kg event.

In 2024, he won a bronze medal in men's 86 kg event at the 2024 Pan American Wrestling Championships held in Acapulco, Mexico. He competed at the Pan American Wrestling Olympic Qualification Tournament held in Acapulco, Mexico hoping to qualify for the 2024 Summer Olympics in Paris, France. He was eliminated in his second match.

== Achievements ==
Year	Tournament	Location	Result	Event
Representing Colombia
2016	Pan American Championships	Frisco, United States	2nd	Freestyle 74 kg
2017	U20 Pan American Championships	Lima, Peru	2nd	Freestyle 84 kg
2017	Bolivarian Games	Santa Marta, Colombia	2nd	Freestyle 86 kg
2018	Central American and Caribbean Games	Barranquilla, Colombia	2nd	Freestyle 86 kg
2019	Pan American Games	Lima, Peru	3rd	Freestyle 86 kg
2022	Pan American Championships	Acapulco, Mexico	3rd	Freestyle 86 kg
2023	Central American and Caribbean Games	San Salvador, El Salvador	2nd	Freestyle 86 kg
2023	Pan American Championships	Buenos Aires, Argentina	3rd	Freestyle 86 kg
2024	Pan American Championships	Acapulco, Mexico	3rd	Freestyle 86 kg
2025	Bolivarian Games	Lima, Peru	2nd	Freestyle 97 kg
2026	Central American and Caribbean Games	Santo Domingo, Dominican Republic	2nd	Freestyle 97 kg
