= Bahamas Olympic Committee =

National Olympic Committee

- Country: Bahamas
- Code: BAH
- Created: 1952
- Recognized: 1952
- Continental Association: PASO
- President: Romell Knowles
- Secretary General: Derron Donaldson
- Website: bahamasolympiccommittee.org

The Bahamas Olympic Committee, formerly the Bahamas Olympic Association (IOC code: BAH), is the National Olympic Committee representing the Bahamas. The committee also serves as the Commonwealth Games Association for the island nation.

== Purpose ==
The Bahamas Olympic Committee manages national teams and represents athletes competing in the Olympic Games, the Central American and Caribbean Games, the Pan American Games, and the Commonwealth Games. The BOC is composed of 23 national federations with full membership privileges, including voting rights in the BOC's general assembly. The executive board consists of the president, six vice-presidents, the secretary general, and the treasurer.

== History ==
=== 20th century ===
The Bahamas Olympic Association was established on 7 May 1952, with Sir George Roberts as its first president. Other founding members were C. V. Bethel, Gerald Cash, Edwin Davies, Randol Fawkes, Reginald Farrington, Joseph Garfunkel, Kendal Isaacs, Edward Mitchell, Fred Moultrie, Cyril Richardson, Reginald Robertson, and Orville Turnquest. The idea was advanced by Eustace Myers, who was inspired and aided by the Jamaica Olympic Association and its head, Sir Herbert McDonald. Since then, the Bahamas has sent a team to every Summer Olympic Games except the boycotted 1980 Summer Olympics in Moscow.

For the first time, Bahamian athletes competed under the auspices of the Bahamas Olympic Association at the 1952 Summer Olympics in Helsinki. The Bahamas competed only in yachting. At those Games, Sir Durward Knowles and Sloane Farrington won the country's first bronze medal in the Star class sailing event. At the 1964 Summer Olympics in Tokyo, the Bahamas won its first Olympic gold medal when Sir Durward Knowles sailed to victory in the 1964 Star class event.

By 1969, the Bahamas Olympic Committee included the national netball association among its member organisations.

Its third president, former Minister of Health Dr. Norman Gay, served from 1972 to 1973. In 1973, Sir Arlington Butler became the fourth president of the Bahamas Olympic Association. He served for more than 35 years. During his tenure, the Bahamas won seven Olympic medals in athletics and produced world-class athletes in athletics, basketball, swimming, softball, boxing, and tennis. Under Sir Butler's decades-long presidency, the committee expanded to include 18 national federations and associations representing Olympic sports. He also contributed to the development of the Pan American Sports Organization and the Association of National Olympic Committees. Butler was voted out of office in 2008 and was succeeded by Wellington Miller, who had served as a vice-president from 2004 to 2008. During Miller's first term as president, the association amended its constitution on 11 April 2013 and adopted the name Bahamas Olympic Committee to conform with International Olympic Committee regulations.

=== 21st century ===
According to The Nassau Guardian, around 2002 the relationship between BOC president Sir Butler and other senior officials deteriorated to the point that the disputes ended up in court. The International Olympic Committee stepped in to coordinate talks and eventually monitored the 2008 elections, at which Sir Butler's former vice-president Wellington Miller was elected president. The first years of Miller's term were marked by controversy; he was openly opposed by a group of executives and criticised for weak leadership. In 2012, the BOC's constitution was amended to introduce a two-term limit for the top executive posts. In 2013, Miller was re-elected president. When elected vice-president in 2013, Cora Hepburn discovered that no financial report had been tabled in the previous four years. Miller served two full four-year terms and tried to run for a third. Speaking to The Nassau Guardian, he expressed confidence in winning, stating that "the new provisions [of the amended constitution] would begin from the time that the amendment came into being". Miller withdrew only after being confronted by an opposition group with lawyer Wayne Munroe, who threatened legal action. In the end, Miller demitted office in 2017, while Romell Knowles was elected president of the Bahamas Olympic Committee and Derron Donaldson was elected secretary general.

In 2019, Derron Donaldson accused Minister of Youth, Sports and Culture Lanisha Rolle of multiple protocol violations: she was meeting with International Association of Athletics Federations (IAAF) officials without prior notice to the Bahamas Association of Athletic Associations (BAAA), the size of her entourage at the 2019 IAAF World Relays caused multiple complaints by national federations, and her ministry's response time was called inadequate. At the same time, some federations had not received financial grants in over a year. Rolle resigned in 2021, and in 2023 she was investigated by police over multiple poor maintenance practices discovered in 2018–21.

Amid the COVID-19 pandemic, the BOC announced support grants for professional athletes who were not sponsored by sports brands or the Olympic Committee.

One of the BOC's biggest successes was hosting the 2017 Commonwealth Youth Games, the largest multi-sport event ever held in the Bahamas.

In June 2023, the BOC established the Athletes Welfare Commission, a committee to assist developing athletes.

In September 2023, Romell Knowles was re-elected president of the BOC, while secretary general Derron Donaldson and treasurer Dorian Roach were also re-elected unopposed.

== Presidents ==
- Sir George W. K. Roberts (1952–1957)
- Robert Symonette (1957–1972)
- Norman R. Gay (1972–1973)
- Sir Arlington Butler (1973–2008)
- Wellington Miller (2008–2017)
- Romell Knowles (2017–present)

== Conflicts ==
The BOC has faced recurring criticism over its handling of coach and athlete selections, with critics arguing that the process lacks transparency and often contradicts the recommendations of local sports associations.

In 2015, the Bahamas Gymnastics Parent Booster Club reported violations in the electoral process of the Gymnastics Federation of The Bahamas, overseen by the BOC and personally by Romell Knowles. The BGPBC argued that Knowles allowed the incumbent president, Barbara Thompson, to use a casting vote to decide the outcome even though, under the Gymnastics Federation of the Bahamas regulations, a second round of voting should be held in the event of a tie. The BOC did not intervene until the issue was reported to the International Gymnastics Federation (FIG).

In July 2020, the announcement of Team Bahamas 2020 sparked an outcry over a controversial selection. In the women's 200 metres, the Bahamas was scheduled to have three competitors but had four eligible athletes: Shaunae Miller-Uibo, Anthonique Strachan, Brianne Bethel, and Tynia Gaither. Strachan was registered as a reserve, even though she finished second to Miller-Uibo in 22.76 seconds at the Bahamas Association of Athletic Associations' National Track and Field Championships in June 2020. Both Bethel and Gaither did not compete there, but they had achieved the qualifying standard earlier in the season. The Bahamas Track and Field Coaches Association objected to the BOC's decision and sent a letter to team officials demanding that Strachan be included in the line-up and that a runoff be held between Gaither and Bethel. Still, a 150 m race between Strachan and Brianne Bethel was staged directly in Tokyo. Strachan won and got to compete in the women's 200 metres. Team manager Dawn Woodside-Johnson and head coach Rudolph Ferguson resigned immediately from the Bahamas Coaches Association because they opposed the runoff. When contacted by the media, Strachan publicly stated that, in her view, "the whole process wasn't handled properly" by both the BOC and the BAAA; she thanked the Bahamas Coaches Association for its support and expressed solidarity with Bethel, who she said had suffered the same mistreatment. The dispute then escalated, with the BOC accusing team officials of insubordination. Veteran coach Rupert Gardiner was stripped of his accreditation and sent home from the Games.

The selection of the team for the 2024 Summer Olympics in Paris was again marked by controversy. In July 2024, Lacarthea Cooper was excluded from Team Bahamas even though she finished in the top three of the 400 m event at the BAAA Junior and Senior Nationals and had been recommended by the Bahamas Association of Athletics Associations. Cooper was replaced by Shania Adderley, a promising athlete who nevertheless finished below Cooper in the trials. BAAA president Drumeco Archer condemned the exclusion as being contrary to the federation's selection process. Following a wide public outcry, the BOC and BAAA announced that they would include Cooper in the team and sponsor her travel to Paris, though she would not be allowed to compete.

== See also ==
- Bahamas at the Olympics
- Bahamas at the Commonwealth Games

== Bibliography ==
- Ministry of Education & Culture (1970). Annual report - Commonwealth of the Bahamas, Ministry of Education and Culture. Ministry of Education & Culture. OCLC 1793427.
- Olympic Directory 1975 (PDF). Ford Presidential Library. 1975.
