= Swimming at the 2006 Central American and Caribbean Games – Women's 4x200 metre freestyle relay =

The Women's 4 × 200 m Freestyle Relay at the 2006 Central American and Caribbean Games occurred on Monday, July 17, 2006, at the S.U. Pedro de Heredia Aquatic Complex in Cartagena, Colombia.

Only 6 relays were entered in the event, and consequently, it was only swum once (in finals).

Records at the time of the event were:

- World Record: 7:53.42, (United States) USA (Coughlin, Voller, Piper, Sandeno), Athens, Greece, August 18, 2004.
- Games Record: 8:39.83, Cuba (names not listed/unknown), 1993 Games in Ponce (Nov.20.1993).

== Results ==
Place	Country	Swimmers	Time	Note
1	Mexico	Mariana Alvarado Gordoa; Patricia Castañeda; Alejandra Galan Lopez; Susana Escobar	8:27.41	GR
2	Venezuela	Yanel Pinto; Jennifer Marquez Mendoza; Andreina Pinto; Erin Volcán	8:32.75	
3	El Salvador	Alexia Pamela Benitez Quijada; Ana Guadalupe Hernandez Duarte; Ileana Ivette Murillo Argueta; Golda Marcus	8:36.40	
4	Puerto Rico	Gretchen Gotay; Vanessa de Lourdes Martinez Colomer; Militza Rios la Luz; Vanessa García	8:37.36	
5	Colombia	María Álvarez; Laura Gómez; Erika Stewart; Marcela Martinez	8:47.56	
6	Cuba	Anay Gutierrez Solenza; Camila Carrillo Garcia Bango; Migmary Calderon Fernandez; Heysi Villareal	8:48.24	
