= Swimming at the 2007 Pan American Games – Women's 4 × 200 metre freestyle relay =

The Women's 4 × 200 m Freestyle Relay event at the 2007 Pan American Games occurred at the Maria Lenk Aquatic Park in Rio de Janeiro, Brazil, with the final being swum on July 18.

== Medalists ==
Gold	Jessica Rodriquez; Emily Kukors; Ava Ohlgren; Katie Carroll; United States
Silver	Chanelle Charron-Watson; Elizabeth Collins; Hilary Bell; Stephanie Horner; Canada
Bronze	Tatiana Lemos; Monique Ferreira; Manuella Lyrio; Paula Baracho; Brazil

== Results ==
=== Finals ===
The final was held on July 18.

Place	Country	Swimmers	Time	Note
1	United States	Jessica Rodriquez (1:59.97); Emily Kukors (1:59.57); Ava Ohlgren (2:00.19); Katie Carroll (2:02.30)	8:02.03	CR
2	Canada	Chanelle Charron-Watson (2:01.04); Elizabeth Collins (2:00.78); Hilary Bell (2:02.08); Stephanie Horner (2:00.66)	8:04.56	
3	Brazil	Tatiana Lemos (2:02.11); Monique Ferreira (2:01.11); Manuella Lyrio (2:04.88); Paula Baracho (2:05.05)	8:13.15	
4	Mexico	Mariana Alvarado (2:05.39); Susana Escobar (2:04.06); Sandra Alanis (2:06.67); Patricia Castañeda (2:04.00)	8:20.12	
5	Venezuela	Andreina Pinto (2:04.47); Erin Volcán (2:05.10); Yanel Pinto (2:06.46); Jennifer Marquez (2:06.21)	8:22.24	
6	El Salvador	Pamela Benítez (2:04.43); Ileana Murillo (2:13.29); Ana Hernández (2:14.82); Golda Marcus (2:08.49)	8:41.03	
7	Bahamas	Arianna Vanderpool-Wallace (2:10.81); McKayla Lightbourn (2:12.70); Ariel Weech (2:12.34); Alana Dillette (2:06.88)	8:42.73	
8	Peru	Fiorella Gómez Sánchez (2:11.94); Slavica Pavic (2:19.80); Massie Carrillo (2:16.11); María Torres (2:11.38)	8:59.23	

=== Preliminaries ===
The heats was held on July 17.

Place	Country	Swimmers	Time	Note
1	United States	Lauren Thies (2:04.11); Teresa Crippen (2:01.28); Emily Kukors (2:00.10); Jessica Rodriguez (1:59.79)	8:05.28	Q, CR
2	Canada	Elizabeth Collins (2:00.64); Hilary Bell (2:01.33); Savannah King (2:05.42); Zsofia Balazs (2:03.66)	8:11.05	Q
3	Brazil	Paula Baracho (2:05.37); Manuella Lyrio (2:05.17); Joanna Maranhão (2:02.59); Tatiana Lemos (2:04.34)	8:17.47	Q
4	Mexico	Liliana Ibáñez (2:07.62); Sandra Alanis (2:05.95); Patricia Castañeda (2:08.33); Alma Arciniega (2:10.19)	8:32.09	Q
5	Venezuela	Yanel Pinto (2:06.15); Jennifer Marquez (2:05.56); Jeserick Pinto (2:14.34); Andreina Pinto (2:08.16)	8:34.21	Q
6	Bahamas	Alana Dillette (2:06.41); McKayla Lightbourn (2:11.77); Alicia Lightbourn (2:16.38); Arianna Vanderpool-Wallace (2:11.43)	8:45.99	Q
7	El Salvador	Pamela Benitez (2:06.97); Ileana Murillo (2:15.86); Ana Hernandez (2:18.07); Golda Marcus (2:11.13)	8:52.03	Q
8	Peru	Fiorella Gómez Sánchez (2:13.08); Slavica Pavic (2:23.96); Massie Carrillo (2:19.08); Maria Alejandra Torres (2:14.07)	9:10.19	Q
9	Honduras	Sharon Fajardo (2:13.93); Laura Paz (2:21.25); Karen Poujol (2:36.30); Laura Leiva (2:20.15)	9:31.63	
