= Swimming at the 2006 Central American and Caribbean Games – Women's 100 metre freestyle =

The Women's 100m Freestyle event at the 2006 Central American and Caribbean Games occurred on Saturday, July 22, 2006, at the S.U. Pedro de Heredia Aquatic Complex in Cartagena, Colombia.

== Records ==
World Record	Jodie Henry (AUS)	53.52	2008-08-14	Athens, Greece
CAC Record	Eileen Coparropa (PAN)	56.58	2002-11-24	(El Salvador) San Salvador

== Results ==
=== Final ===
Place	Swimmer	Country	Time	Note
1	Vanessa García	Puerto Rico	55.80	GR
2	Claudia Poll	Costa Rica	56.31	
3	Arlene Semeco	Venezuela	57.06	
4	Heysi Villarreal	Cuba	58.05	
5	Carolina Moreno	Mexico	58.53	
6	Maríana Álvarado	Mexico	58.71	
7	Ximena Maria Vilár	Venezuela	58.75	
8	Isabella Tafur	Colombia	59.35	

== Preliminaries ==
Rank	Swimmer	Country	Time	Note
1	Claudia Poll	Costa Rica	57.43	Q
2	Vanessa García	Puerto Rico	57.95	Q
3	Arlene Semeco	Venezuela	58.11	Q
4	Heysi Villarreal	Cuba	58.67	Q
5	Maríana Álvarado	Mexico	58.69	Q
6	Carolina Moreno	Mexico	59.11	Q
7	Isabella Tafur	Colombia	59.70	Q
8	Ximena Maria Vilár	Venezuela	59.79	Q
9	Nikia Hillarie	Bahamas	59.92	
10	Sharon Fajardo	Honduras	1:00.45	
11	María Álvarez	Colombia	1:00.76	
12	Alia Atkinson	Jamaica	1:01.17	
13	Alexis Jordan	Barbados	1:01.79	
14	Sharntelle McLean	Trinidad and Tobago	1:03.26	
15	Jennifer Powell	Cayman Islands	1:03.41	
16	Nishani Cicilson	Suriname	1:03.88	
17	Sade Daal	Suriname	1:04.70	
18	Dalia Tórrez	Nicaragua	1:05.69	
--	Gisela Morales	Guatemala	DNS	
--	Alana Dillette	Bahamas	DNS	
--	Pamela Benítez	El Salvador	DNS	
--	Nilshaira Isenia	Netherlands Antilles	DNS	
