= Swimming at the 2006 Central American and Caribbean Games – Women's 200 metre freestyle =

The women's 200m Freestyle event at the 2006 Central American and Caribbean Games occurred on Thursday, July 20, 2006 at the S.U. Pedro de Heredia Aquatic Complex in Cartagena, Colombia.

== Records ==
World Record	Franziska van Almsick (GER)	1:56.64	2002-08-03	Berlin, Germany
CAC Record	Silvia Poll (CRC)	2:02.80	1986-06-26	(Dominican Republic) Santo Domingo

== Results ==
=== Final ===
Place	Swimmer	Country	Time	Note
1	Claudia Poll	Costa Rica	2:00.19	GR
2	Erin Volcán	Venezuela	2:03.92	
3	Pamela Benítez	El Salvador	2:04.11	
4	Susana Escobar	Mexico	2:04.76	
5	Heysi Villarreal	Cuba	2:05.38	
6	Maríana Álvarado	Mexico	2:05.41	
7	Heather Roffey	Cayman Islands	2:09.55	
8	Golda Marcus	El Salvador	2:12.87	

=== Preliminaries ===
Rank	Swimmer	Country	Time	Note
1	Claudia Poll	Costa Rica	2:02.82	Q
2	Pamela Benítez	El Salvador	2:06.59	Q
3	Erin Volcán	Venezuela	2:06.71	Q
4	Heysi Villarreal	Cuba	2:06.86	Q
5	Susana Escobar	Mexico	2:07.48	Q
6	Golda Marcus	El Salvador	2:07.86	Q
7	Maríana Álvarado	Mexico	2:08.33	Q
8	Heather Roffey	Cayman Islands	2:09.36	Q
9	Jennifer Marquez	Venezuela	2:09.66	
10	Alana Dillette	Bahamas	2:10.38	
11	María Álvarez	Colombia	2:10.66	
12	Laura Gómez	Colombia	2:11.09	
13	Arianna Vanderpool-Wallace	Bahamas	2:12.45	
14	Valerie Ayla Marie Eman	Aruba	2:15.88	
15	Sade Daal	Suriname	2:20.01	
