= Swimming at the 2006 Central American and Caribbean Games – Women's 400 metre freestyle =

Women's freestyle event

The women's 400m Freestyle event at the 2006 Central American and Caribbean Games occurred on Friday, July 21, 2006 at the S.U. Pedro de Heredia Aquatic Complex in Cartagena, Colombia.

== Records ==
World Record	Laure Manaudou (FRA)	4:03.03	2006-05-12	Tours, France
CAC Record	Silvia Poll (CRC)	4:18.30	1986-06-27	(Dominican Republic) Santo Domingo

== Results ==
=== Final ===
Rank	Swimmer	Country	Time	Note
1	Claudia Poll	Costa Rica	4:15.01	GR
2	Susana Escobar	Mexico	4:18.11	
3	Patricia Castañeda	Mexico	4:20.63	
4	Andreina Pinto	Venezuela	4:24.32	
5	Golda Marcus	El Salvador	4:24.37	
6	Pamela Benítez	El Salvador	4:27.09	
7	Yanel Pinto	Venezuela	4:30.09	
8	Marcela Martinez	Colombia	4:37.37	

=== Preliminaries ===
Rank	Swimmer	Country	Time	Note
1	Claudia Poll	Costa Rica	4:17.98	Q, GR
2	Susana Escobar	Mexico	4:26.40	Q
3	Patricia Castañeda	Mexico	4:27.31	Q
4	Andreina Pinto	Venezuela	4:30.12	Q
5	Yanel Pinto	Venezuela	4:30.70	Q
6	Pamela Benítez	El Salvador	4:31.97	Q
7	Golda Marcus	El Salvador	4:33.64	Q
8	Marcela Martinez	Colombia	4:34.72	Q
9	Heather Roffey	Cayman Islands	4:35.71	
10	María Álvarez	Colombia	4:36.98	
11	Migmary Calderón	Cuba	4:41.59	
12	Militza Rios	Puerto Rico	4:43.70	
13	Camila Carrillo García	Cuba	4:46.24	
14	Valerie Ayla Marie Eman	Aruba	4:46.88	
15	Johanna Rodríguez	Costa Rica	4:48.81	
16	Cindy Toscano	Guatemala	4:50.24	
17	Michael-Anne Myrvang	Virgin Islands	4:58.44	
--	Gretchen Gotay	Puerto Rico	DNS	
