= Swimming at the 2006 Central American and Caribbean Games – Women's 4x100 metre medley relay =

The Women's 4 × 100 m Medley Relay at the 2006 Central American and Caribbean Games occurred on July 21, 2006, at the S.U. Pedro de Heredia Aquatic Complex in Cartagena, Colombia.

Only 6 relays were entered in the event, and consequently, it was only swum once (in finals).

Records at the time of the event were:

- World Record: 3:57.32, Australia (Rooney, Jones, Thomas, Henry), Athens, Greece, August 21, 2004.
- Games Record: 4:23.42, Mexico (Marmolejo, Maristany, España, Lopez), 2002 Games in San Salvador (Nov.28.2002).

== Results ==
Place	Country	Swimmers	Time	Note
1	Venezuela	Erin Volcán; Daniela Victoria Sacco; Maria Alejandra Rodriguez; Arlene Semeco	4:17.51	GR
2	Mexico	Fernanda González; Adriana Marmolejo; Teresa Victor Lopez; Carolina Moreno Cervantes	4:18.07	
3	Puerto Rico	Gretchen Gotay; Betsmara Nye Cruz Lebron; Vanessa de Lourdes Martinez Colomer; Vanessa García	4:26.17	
4	Bahamas	Alana Dillette; Alicia Lightbourne; Arianna Vanderpool-Wallace; Nikia Hillarie Deveaux	4:26.26	
5	Colombia	Erika Stewart; Monica Álvarez; Carolina Colorado Henao; Isabella Tafur	4:28.57	
6	Suriname	Nishani Cicilson; Chinyere Pigot; Priscilla Jannasch; Sade Daal	4:52.04	
