= Swimming at the 2006 Central American and Caribbean Games – Women's 200 metre individual medley =

The Women's 200m Individual Medley at the 2006 Central American and Caribbean Games occurred on Friday, July 21, 2006, at the S.U. Pedro de Heredia Aquatic Complex in Cartagena, Colombia.

Records at the time of the event were:

- World Record: 2:09.72, Wu Yanyan (China), Shanghai, China, October 17, 1997.
- Games Record: 2:19.00, Carolyn Adel (Suriname), 1998 Games in Maracaibo (Aug.13.1998).

== Results ==
=== Final ===
Place	Swimmer	Country	Time	Note
1	Alia Atkinson	Jamaica	2:21.69	
2	Susana Escobar	Mexico	2:21.87	
3	Erin Volcán	Venezuela	2:22.11	
4	Alejandra Galan Lopez	Mexico	2:22.27	
5	Silvia Perez Sierra	Venezuela	2:25.39	
6	Alana Dillette	Bahamas	2:27.99	
7	Laura Gómez	Colombia	2:30.33	
8	Laura Rodriguez Blanco	Dominican Republic	2:33.07	

=== Preliminaries ===
Rank	Swimmer	Country	Time	Note
1	Alejandra Galan Lopez	Mexico	2:25.51	Q
2	Erin Volcán	Venezuela	2:25.92	Q
3	Susana Escobar	Mexico	2:26.49	Q
4	Alia Atkinson	Jamaica	2:26.76	Q
5	Silvia Perez Sierra	Venezuela	2:27.97	Q
6	Alana Dillette	Bahamas	2:28.16	Q
7	Laura Rodriguez Blanco	Dominican Republic	2:28.53	Q
8	Laura Gómez	Colombia	2:31.04	Q
9	Marcela Aguirre	Colombia	2:31.72	
10	Arianna Vanderpool-Wallace	Bahamas	2:32.71	
11	Alexis Jordan	Barbados	2:32.85	
12	Kimba Collymore	Trinidad and Tobago	2:36.12	
13	Michael-Anne Myrvang	Virgin Islands	2:39.65	
14	Dalia Massiel Tórrez Zamora	Nicaragua	2:40.09	
15	Lauren Renee Harcrow	Virgin Islands	2:41.90	
--	Jennifer Powell	Cayman Islands	DNS	
--	Laura Lucia Paz Chavez	Honduras	DNS	
--	Vanessa de Lourdes Martinez Colomer	Puerto Rico	DNS	
--	Heather Roffey	Cayman Islands	DQ	
