= Swimming at the 2006 Central American and Caribbean Games – Women's 4x100 metre freestyle relay =

The women's 4 × 100 m Freestyle Relay at the 2006 Central American and Caribbean Games occurred on Wednesday, July 19, 2006, at the S.U. Pedro de Heredia Aquatic Complex in Cartagena, Colombia.

Only 7 relays were entered in the event, and consequently, it was only swum once (in finals).

Records at the time of the event were:

- World Record: 3:35.94, Australia (Mills, Lenton, Thomas, Henry), Athens, Greece, August 14, 2004.
- Games Record: 3:57.55, Venezuela (Vilar, Lopes, Aponte, Semeco), 2002 Games in San Salvador (Nov.26.2002).

== Results ==
Place	Country	Swimmers	Time	Note
1	Venezuela	Ximena Maria Vilar Arriojas; Diana Julieta Lopez Agudelo; Erin Volcán; Arlene Semeco	3:52.40	GR
2	Mexico	Mariana Alvarado Gordoa; Carolina Moreno Cervantes; Liliana Ibañez Lopez; Alma Paulina Arciniega Castro	3:53.46	
3	Bahamas	Nikia Hillarie Deveaux; Ariel Weech; Arianna Vanderpool-Wallace; Alana Dillette	3:57.22	
4	Colombia	Isabella Tafur; Carolina Colorado Henao; Erika Stewart; María Álvarez	3:59.86	
5	El Salvador	Ileana Ivette Murillo Argueta; Alexia Pamela Benitez Quijada; Ana Guadalupe Hernandez Duarte; Golda Marcus	4:02.55	
6	Cuba	Camila Carrillo Garcia Bango; Migmary Calderon Fernandez; Anay Gutierrez Solenza; Heysi Villareal	4:05.86	
7	Suriname	Nishani Cicilson; Priscilla Jannasch; Chinyere Pigot; Sade Daal	4:20.91	
