= Swimming at the 2006 Central American and Caribbean Games – Women's 1500 metre freestyle =

The women's 1500m Freestyle event at the 2006 Central American and Caribbean Games occurred on Wednesday, July 19, 2006, at the S.U. Pedro de Heredia Aquatic Complex in Cartagena, Colombia. The event was a timed final event, meaning that it was swum once (rather than the typical 2 times with prelim/finals, and the top-8 advancing).

== Records ==
World Record	Janet Evans (USA)	15:52.10	1988-03-26	(United States) Orlando, USA
CAC Record	—	—	—	—

== Results ==
Place	Swimmer	Country	Time	Note
1	Patricia Castañeda	Mexico	17:03.47	GR
2	Susana Escobar	Mexico	17:14.83	
3	Golda Marcus	El Salvador	17:31.70	
4	Andreina Pinto	Venezuela	17:43.08	
5	Yanel Pinto	Venezuela	17:45.62	
6	Isabel Acuña	Colombia	17:46.25	
7	Gretchen Gotay	Puerto Rico	17:51.21	
8	Juanita Hurtado	Colombia	18:22.18	
9	Cindy Toscano	Guatemala	18:23.82	
10	Militza Rios	Puerto Rico	18:24.56	
11	Jodie Foster	Cayman Islands	21:35.24	
--	Johanna Rodríguez	Costa Rica	DNS	
