= Swimming at the 2006 Central American and Caribbean Games – Women's 800 metre freestyle =

The Women's 800m Freestyle event at the 2006 Central American and Caribbean Games occurred on Monday, July 17, 2006, at the S.U. Pedro de Heredia Aquatic Complex in Cartagena, Colombia. It was the first swimming event of the Games.

Records at the start of the event were:

- World Record (WR): 8:16.22, Janet Evans (USA), Tokyo, Japan, August 20, 1989
- CAC Record (CR): 8:52.57, Carolyn Adel (Suriname), 1998 Games in Maracaibo, Venezuela, August 9, 1998

== Results ==
(Time Final)

Place	Swimmer	Country	Time	Note
1	Susana Escobar	Mexico	8:51.05	GR
2	Patricia Castañeda	Mexico	8:54.15	
3	Andreina Pinto	Venezuela	9:00.36	
4	Golda Marcus	El Salvador	9:12.72	
5	Isabela Acuña	Colombia	9:15.91	
6	Heather Roffey	Cayman Islands	9:21.16	
7	Juanita Hurtado	Colombia	9:29.80	
8	Militza Rios La Luz	Puerto Rico	9:37.31	
9	Valerie Ayla Marie Eman	Aruba	9:41.77	
10	Cindy Toscano	Guatemala	9:48.37	
11	Johanna Rodriguez Chavarria	Costa Rica	9:55.05	
12	Jodie Foster	Cayman Islands	10:24.98	
