= Swimming at the 2006 Central American and Caribbean Games – Women's 100 metre backstroke =

The women's 100m Freestyle event at the 2006 Central American and Caribbean Games occurred on Saturday, July 22, 2006, at the S.U. Pedro de Heredia Aquatic Complex in Cartagena, Colombia.

== Records ==
World Record	Natalie Coughlin (USA)	59.58	2002-08-13	(United States) Fort Lauderdale
CAC Record	Silvia Poll (CRC)	1:04.43	1986-06-27	(Dominican Republic) Santo Domingo

== Results ==
=== Final ===
Place	Swimmer	Country	Time	Note
1	Fernanda González	Mexico	1:04.28	GR
2	Gisela Morales	Guatemala	1:04.62	
3	Carolina Colorado Henao	Colombia	1:05.54	
4	Erin Volcán	Venezuela	1:05.71	
5	Jeserick Pinto	Venezuela	1:06.18	
6	Lourdes Villaseñor	Mexico	1:06.27	
7	Erika Stewart	Colombia	1:06.55	
8	Gretchen Gotay	Puerto Rico	1:08.24	

=== Preliminaries ===
Rank	Swimmer	Country	Time	Note
1	Carolina Colorado Henao	Colombia	1:05.56	Q
2	Erin Volcán	Venezuela	1:06.17	Q
3	Gisela Morales	Guatemala	1:06.38	Q
4	Erika Stewart	Colombia	1:06.65	Q
5	Fernanda González	Mexico	1:06.88	Q
6	Jeserick Pinto	Venezuela	1:07.38	Q
7	Lourdes Villaseñor	Mexico	1:07.80	Q
8	Gretchen Gotay	Puerto Rico	1:08.38	Q
9	Alana Dillette	Bahamas	1:08.44	
10	Laura Rodríguez	Dominican Republic	1:08.56	
11	Susan Anchia	Costa Rica	1:09.82	
12	Natalie Ferdinand	Barbados	1:09.96	
13	Ariel Weech	Bahamas	1:11.08	
14	Donna-Marie Wickham	Trinidad and Tobago	1:11.36	
15	Charlotte Palmer-Martin	Saint Lucia	1:13.07	
16	Nishani Cicilson	Suriname	1:13.26	
--	Dalia Tórrez	Nicaragua	DNS	
