= Swimming at the 2006 Central American and Caribbean Games – Women's 400 metre individual medley =

The Women's 400 m Individual Medley event at the 2006 Central American and Caribbean Games occurred on Monday, July 17, 2006, at the S.U. Pedro de Heredia Aquatic Complex in Cartagena, Colombia.

Records at the time of the event were:

- World Record: 4:33.59, Yana Klochkova (Ukraine), Sydney, Australia, September 16, 2000.
- Games Record: 4:52.42, Carolyn Adel (Suriname), 1998 Games in Maracaibo (August.9.1998).

== Results ==
=== Final ===
Place	Swimmer	Country	Time	Note
1	Susana Escobar	Mexico	4:57.49	
2	Silvia Perez Sierra	Venezuela	5:02.82	
3	Prisciliana Eugenia Escobar Torres	Mexico	5:05.53	
4	Erika Stewart	Colombia	5:10.61	
5	Alana Dillette	Bahamas	5:12.44	
6	Marcela Aguirre	Colombia	5:18.30	
7	Laura lucia Paz Chavez	Honduras	5:24.36	
--	Adrienne Indira Fraser	Aruba	DNS	

=== Preliminaries ===
Rank	Swimmer	Country	Time	Note
1	Susana Escobar	Mexico	4:59.36	Q
2	Prisciliana Eugenia Escobar Torres	Mexico	5:08.19	Q
3	Silvia Perez Sierra	Venezuela	5:14.44	Q
4	Erika Stewart	Colombia	5:15.28	Q
5	Alana Dillette	Bahamas	5:20.46	Q
6	Marcela Aguirre	Colombia	5:21.28	Q
7	Laura Lucia Paz Chavez	Honduras	5:32.78	Q
8	Adrienne Indira Fraser	Aruba	5:34.13	Q
9	Susan Anchia Peralta	Costa Rica	5:34.21	
10	Michael-Anne yrvang	Virgin Islands	5:36.83	
11	Lauren Renee Harcrow	Virgin Islands	5:52.39	
--	Alicia Lightbourne	Bahamas	DNS	
