= Swimming at the 2006 Central American and Caribbean Games – Women's 200 metre backstroke =

The Women's 200m Backstroke event at the 2006 Central American and Caribbean Games occurred on Tuesday, July 18, 2006 at the S.U. Pedro de Heredia Aquatic Complex in Cartagena, Colombia.

== Records ==
World Record	Krisztina Egerszegi (HUN)	2:06.62	1991-08-25	Athens, Greece
CAC Record	Silvia Poll (CRC)	2:19.32	1986-06-30	(Dominican Republic) Santo Domingo

== Results ==
=== Final ===
Place	Swimmer	Country	Time	Note
1	Erin Volcán	Venezuela	2:16.65	GR
2	Gisela Morales	Guatemala	2:16.92	
3	Lourdes Villaseñor	Mexico	2:17.93	
4	Fernanda González	Mexico	2:19.66	
5	Gretchen Gotay	Puerto Rico	2:22.82	
6	Erika Stewart	Colombia	2:23.55	
7	Laura Rodríguez	Dominican Republic	2:24.74	
8	Laura Gómez	Colombia	2:28.64	

=== Preliminaries ===
Rank	Swimmer	Country	Time	Note
1	Lourdes Villaseñor	Mexico	2:19.87	Q
2	Erin Volcán	Venezuela	2:21.17	Q
3	Gisela Morales	Guatemala	2:23.33	Q
4	Gretchen Gotay	Puerto Rico	2:23.68	Q
5	Laura Rodríguez	Dominican Republic	2:24.03	Q
6	Erika Stewart	Colombia	2:24.21	Q
7	Laura Gómez	Colombia	2:26.93	Q
8	Fernanda González	Mexico	2:27.26	Q
9	Susan Anchia	Costa Rica	2:28.08	
10	Valerie Ayla Marie Eman	Aruba	2:32.77	
11	Nishani Cicilson	Suriname	2:39.53	
12	Lauren Harcrow	Virgin Islands	2:41.38	
13	Charlotte Palmer-Martin	Saint Lucia	2:41.90	
14	Jodie Foster	Cayman Islands	2:48.47	
