= Swimming at the 2006 Central American and Caribbean Games – Women's 50 metre backstroke =

The Women's 50m Backstroke event at the 2006 Central American and Caribbean Games occurred on Wednesday, July 19, 2006, at the S.U. Pedro de Heredia Aquatic Complex in Cartagena, Colombia.

== Records ==
World Record	Sandra Völker (GER)	28.25	2000-06-17	Berlin, Germany
CAC Record	—	—	—	—

== Results ==
=== Final ===
Place	Swimmer	Country	Time	Note
1	Fernanda González	Mexico	30.61	GR
2	Jeserick Pinto	Venezuela	30.77	
3	Gisela Morales	Guatemala	30.96	
4	Alana Dillette	Bahamas	30.99	
5	Erika Stewart	Colombia	31.02	
6	Carolina Colorado Henao	Colombia	31.13	
7	Natalie Ferdinand	Barbados	31.85	
8	Erin Volcán	Venezuela	31.88	

=== Preliminaries ===
Rank	Swimmer	Country	Time	Note
1	Carolina Colorado Henao	Colombia	30.75	Q, GR
2	Jeserick Pinto	Venezuela	30.91	Q
3	Fernanda González	Mexico	31.07	Q
4	Gisela Morales	Guatemala	31.23	Q
5	Natalie Ferdinand	Barbados	31.68	Q
6	Erin Volcán	Venezuela	31.72	Q
7	Erika Stewart	Colombia	31.92	Q
8	Alana Dillette	Bahamas	32.00	Q
9	Laura Rodríguez	Dominican Republic	32.15	
10	Teresa Victor	Mexico	32.26	
11	Ariel Weech	Bahamas	32.44	
12	Donna-Marie Wickham	Trinidad and Tobago	32.67	
13	Nishani Cicilson	Suriname	33.48	
14	Susan Anchia	Costa Rica	33.49	
15	Charlotte Palmer-Martin	Saint Lucia	34.27	
16	Priscilla Jannasch	Suriname	35.00	
--	Nilshaira Isenia	Netherlands Antilles	DNS	
