= Swimming at the 2006 Central American and Caribbean Games – Women's 50 metre butterfly =

The women's 50m Butterfly event at the 2006 Central American and Caribbean Games occurred on Tuesday, July 18, 2006, at the S.U. Pedro de Heredia Aquatic Complex in Cartagena, Colombia.

== Records ==
World Record	Inge de Bruijn (NED)	25.64	2000-05-25	(United Kingdom) Sheffield, Great Britain
CAC Record	—	—	—	—

== Results ==
=== Final ===
Place	Swimmer	Country	Time	Note
1	Alia Atkinson	Jamaica	28.59	
2	Sharntelle McLean	Trinidad and Tobago	28.62	
3	Teresa Victor Lopez	Mexico	28.81	
4	Gisela Morales	Guatemala	28.95	
5	Heysi Villareal	Cuba	29.12	
6	Maria Alejandra Rodriguez	Venezuela	29.20	
7	Carolina Colorado Henao	Colombia	29.38	
8	Marsha Nicole Watson	Barbados	29.76	

=== Preliminaries ===
Rank	Swimmer	Country	Time	Note
1	Teresa Victor Lopez	Mexico	28.36	Q, GR
2	Alia Atkinson	Jamaica	28.91	Q
3	Gisela Morales	Guatemala	29.03	Q
4	Sharntelle McLean	Trinidad and Tobago	29.07	Q
5	Carolina Colorado Henao	Colombia	29.09	Q
6	Maria Alejandra Rodriguez	Venezuela	29.24	Q
7	Heysi Villareal	Cuba	29.28	Q
8	Marsha Nichole Watson	Barbados	29.41	Q
9	Vanessa de Lourdes Martinez Colomer	Puerto Rico	29.44	
10	Andreina Rojas Jimenez	Venezuela	29.55	
10	Arianna Vanderpool-Wallace	Bahamas	29.55	
12	Alma Paulina Arciniega Castro	Mexico	29.65	
13	Sharon Paola Fajardo Sierra	Honduras	29.95	
14	Ana Guadalupe Hernandez Duarte	El Salvador	30.00	
15	Heather Roffey	Cayman Islands	30.01	NR
16	Anay Gutierrez Solenza	Cuba	30.06	
17	Nishan Cicilson	Suriname	30.32	
18	Teisha Lightbourne	Bahamas	30.33	
19	Ileana Ivette Murillo Argueta	El Salvador	30.35	
20	Priscilla Jannasch	Suriname	30.49	
21	Natalie Ferdinand	Barbados	30.55	
22	Laura Lucia Paz Chavez	Honduras	30.58	
23	Jennifer Powell	Cayman Islands	32.53	
