= Swimming at the 2007 Pan American Games – Women's 4 × 100 metre freestyle relay =

The Women's 4 × 100 m Freestyle Relay event at the 2007 Pan American Games took place at the Maria Lenk Aquatic Park in Rio de Janeiro, Brazil, with the final being swum on July 19.

== Medalists ==
Gold	Julia Smit; Samantha Woodward; Emily Kukors; Maritza Correia; United States
Silver	Elizabeth Collins; Seanna Mitchell; Chanelle Charron-Watson; Hilary Bell; Canada
Bronze	Arlene Semeco; Erin Volcán; Ximena Vilar; Yanel Pinto; Venezuela

== Results ==
=== Finals ===
Place	Country	Swimmers	Time	Note
1	United States	Julia Smit (56.22); Samantha Woodward (55.29); Emily Kukors (55.31); Maritza Correia (55.15)	3:41.97	
2	Canada	Elizabeth Collins (56.53); Seanna Mitchell (56.09); Chanelle Charron-Watson (55.79); Hilary Bell (57.82)	3:46.23	
3	Venezuela	Arlene Semeco (56.69); Erin Volcán (58.20); Ximena Vilar (58.67); Yanel Pinto (59.31)	3:52.87	
4	Bahamas	Nikia Deveaux (58.34); Alana Dillette (57.18); Arianna Vanderpool-Wallace (58.75); Ariel Weech (59.64)	3:53.91	
5	Mexico	Mariana Alvarado (1:00.48); Alma Arciniega (1:00.85); Sandra Alanis (1:00.34); Liliana Ibáñez (57.90)	3:59.57	
6	Peru	María Torres (1:03.65); Fiorella Gómez Sánchez (1:02.48); Valeria Silva (1:02.75); Massie Carrillo (1:00.80)	4:09.68	
7	Uruguay	Eisa Pumar (1:01.74); Ines Remersaro (1:02.46); Antonella Scanavino (1:04.46); Andrea Guerra (1:03.66)	4:12.32	
--	Brazil	Tatiana Lemos (56.25); Flávia Delaroli (55.78); Monique Ferreira (56.01); Rebeca Gusmão (54.92)	~~3:42.96~~	Result nullified See Rebeca Gusmão entry for explanation

=== Preliminaries ===
The heats was held on July 18.

Place	Country	Swimmers	Time	Note
1	United States	Lauren Thies (56.95); Emily Kukors (55.27); Maritza Correia (56.45); Michele King (57.09)	3:45.76	Q
2	Canada	Hilary Bell (58.13); Chanelle Charron-Watson (56.36); Elizabeth Collins (56.36); Seanna Mitchell (56.33)	3:47.18	Q
3	Brazil	Tatiana Lemos (56.33); Flávia Delaroli (58.91); Monique Ferreira (59.08); Manuella Lyrio (59.93)	3:54.25	Q
4	Bahamas	Nikia Deveaux (58.29); Alana Dillette (58.01); Arianna Vanderpool-Wallace (58.72); Ariel Weech (59.97)	3:54.99	Q
5	Venezuela	Ximena Vilar (59.76); Yanel Pinto (59.71); Jeserik Pinto (59.69); Jennifer Marquez (1:00.26)	3:59.42	Q
6	Mexico	Liliana Ibáñez (58.36); Alma Arciniega (59.89); Sandra Alanis (1:01.94); Mariana Alvarado (59.29)	3:59.48	Q
7	Uruguay	Antonella Scanavino (1:01.40); Elsa Pumar (1:02.09); Ines Remersaro (1:02.65); Andrea Guerra (1:04.16)	4:10.30	Q
8	Peru	María Torres (1:02.48); Fiorella Gómez Sánchez (1:04.38); Valeria Silva (1:04.00); Massie Carrillo (1:02.81)	4:13.67	Q
9	Honduras	Sharon Fajardo (1:00.75); Laura Leiva (1:05.20); Karen Poujol (1:08.78); Laura Páz (1:05.02)	4:19.75	
