= Swimming at the 2006 Central American and Caribbean Games – Men's 200 metre butterfly =

The men's 200m Butterfly event at the 2006 Central American and Caribbean Games occurred on Wednesday, July 19, 2006 at the S.U. Pedro de Heredia Aquatic Complex in Cartagena, Colombia.

Records at the time of the event were:

- World Record: 1:53.93, Michael Phelps (USA), Barcelona, Spain, July 22, 2003.
- Games Record: 1:58.45, Juan Veloz (Mexico), 2002 Games in San Salvador (Nov.28.2002).

== Results ==
=== Final ===
| Place | Swimmer | Country | Time | Note |
|---|---|---|---|---|
| 1 | Juan Veloz | Mexico | 1:58.75 | |
| 2 | Jeremy Knowles | Bahamas | 2:00.37 | |
| 3 | Julio Galofre | Colombia | 2:02.13 | |
| 4 | Cesar David Uribe Malajevich | Mexico | 2:02.17 | |
| 5 | Leopoldo Jose Andara Gonzalez | Venezuela | 2:03.29 | |
| 6 | Shaune Fraser | Cayman Islands | 2:03.80 | |
| 7 | Douglas Lennox-Silva | Puerto Rico | 2:04.08 | |
| 8 | Roy Felipe Barahona Fuentes | Honduras | 2:04.34 | |

=== Preliminaries ===
| Rank | Swimmer | Country | Time | Note |
|---|---|---|---|---|
| 1 | Juan Veloz | Mexico | 2:02.28 | Q |
| 2 | Cesar David Uribe Malajevich | Mexico | 2:02.82 | Q |
| 3 | Julio Galofre | Colombia | 2:02.95 | Q |
| 4 | Jeremy Knowles | Bahamas | 2:03.25 | Q |
| 5 | Leopoldo Jose Andara Gonzalez | Venezuela | 2:03.58 | Q |
| 6 | Shaune Fraser | Cayman Islands | 2:03.99 | Q |
| 7 | Douglas Lennox-Silva | Puerto Rico | 2:04.26 | Q |
| 8 | Roy Felipe Barahona Fuentes | Honduras | 2:04.42 | Q |
| 9 | Jorge Arturo Acrce Aita | Costa Rica | 2:05.97 | |
| 10 | Javier Hernandez Maradiaga | Honduras | 2:06.31 | |
| 11 | Omar Pinzón | Colombia | 2:06.66 | |
| 12 | Brad Hamilton | Jamaica | 2:08.89 | |
| 13 | Travis Forte | Jamaica | 2:10.92 | |
| 14 | Omar Núñez | Nicaragua | 2:14.25 | |
