= Swimming at the 2006 Central American and Caribbean Games – Men's 400 metre individual medley =

The Men's 400m Individual Medley event at the 2006 Central American and Caribbean Games occurred on Tuesday, July 18, 2006 at the S.U. Pedro de Heredia Aquatic Complex in Cartagena, Colombia.

Records at the time of the event were:

- World Record: 4:08.26, Michael Phelps (USA), Athens, Greece, August 14, 2004.
- Games Record: 4:26.86, Gunter Rodriguez (Cuba), 1998 Games in Maracaibo (Aug.8.1998).

== Results ==
=== Final ===
Place	Swimmer	Country	Time	Note
1	Bradley Ally	Barbados	4:22.86	GR
2	Jeremy Knowles	Bahamas	4:23.83	
3	Raul Alejandro Lopez Juarez	Mexico	4:34.27	
4	Luis Ricardo Escobar Torres	Mexico	4:34.34	
5	Douglas Lennox-Silva	Puerto Rico	4:34.42	
6	Juan Francisco Montenegro Abascal	Guatemala	4:40.35	
7	Juan Ramon Lopez Valladares	Honduras	4:41.79	
8	Morgan Richard Locke	Virgin Islands	4:49.91	

=== Preliminaries ===
Rank	Swimmer	Country	Time	Note
1	Jeremy Knowles	Bahamas	4:30.23	Q
2	Bradley Ally	Barbados	4:34.94	Q
3	Luis Ricardo Escobar Torres	Mexico	4:38.27	Q
4	Douglas Lennox-Silva	Puerto Rico	4:38.34	Q
5	Raul Alejandro Lopez Juarez	Mexico	4:38.69	Q
6	Juan Ramon Lopez Valladares	Honduras	4:40.41	Q
7	Juan Francisco Montenegro Abascal	Guatemala	4:45.07	Q
8	Morgan Richard Locke	Virgin Islands	4:46.92	Q
9	Branden Wesley Whitehurst	Virgin Islands	4:46.88	
10	Brett Fraser	Cayman Islands	4:51.18	
11	Diego Bonilla	Colombia	4:53.24	
12	Leopoldo Jose Andara Gonzalez	Venezuela	4:57.08	
--	Shaune Fraser	Cayman Islands	DNS	
--	Omar Pinzón	Colombia	DQ	
