= Swimming at the 2006 Central American and Caribbean Games – Men's 1500 metre freestyle =

The Men's 1,500 m Freestyle event at the 2006 Central American and Caribbean Games took place on Wednesday, July 19, 2006, at the S.U. Pedro de Heredia Aquatic Complex in Cartagena, Colombia. This was a timed-final event, meaning that the swimmers only swam the race once, and whatever time they obtained was used to rank them in the final rankings.

== Records ==
World Record	Grant Hackett (AUS)	14:34.56	2001-07-27	(Japan) Fukuoka
CAC Record	Alberto Guimarães (VEN)	15:39.90	2002-11-29	(El Salvador) San Salvador

== Results ==
Place	Swimmer	Country	Time	Note
1	Ricardo Monasterio	Venezuela	15:38.99	GR
2	Iván López	Mexico	15:39.80	
3	Erwin Maldonado	Venezuela	15:56.55	
4	Evan Marcus	Guatemala	16:09.58	
5	Mateo de Angulo	Colombia	16:16.35	
6	Mario Montoya	Costa Rica	16:25.59	
7	Luis Enrique González	Mexico	16:25.60	
8	John Littlepage	Trinidad and Tobago	16:43.86	
9	Micky van der Vaart	Aruba	17:02.03	
10	Jack Patiño	Colombia	17:05.34	
11	Omar Núñez	Nicaragua	17:15.32	
