= Swimming at the 2006 Central American and Caribbean Games – Men's 400 metre freestyle =

The Men's 400m Freestyle event at the 2006 Central American and Caribbean Games occurred on Saturday, July 22, 2006, at the S.U. Pedro de Heredia Aquatic Complex in Cartagena, Colombia.

== Records ==
World Record	Ian Thorpe (AUS)	3:40.08	2002-07-30	(United Kingdom) Manchester
CAC Record	Ricardo Monasterio (VEN)	3:57.63	2002-11-27	(El Salvador) San Salvador

== Results ==
=== Final ===
Place	Swimmer	Country	Time	Note
1	Iván López	Mexico	3:57.21	GR
2	Ricardo Monasterio	Venezuela	3:57.71	
3	Erwin Maldonado	Venezuela	3:57.85	
4	Jeremy Knowles	Bahamas	4:02.96	
5	Raul Enrique Martínez	Puerto Rico	4:03.40	
6	Micky van der Vaart	Aruba	4:05.29	
7	Sebastián Arango	Colombia	4:05.41	
8	Alejandro Siqueiros	Mexico	4:05.79	

=== Preliminaries ===
Rank	Swimmer	Country	Time	Note
1	Ricardo Monasterio	Venezuela	4:01.98	Q
2	Erwin Maldonado	Venezuela	4:03.43	Q
3	Jeremy Knowles	Bahamas	4:04.67	Q
4	Iván López	Mexico	4:06.47	Q
5	Alejandro Siqueiros	Mexico	4:07.13	Q
6	Micky van der Vaart	Aruba	4:07.14	Q
7	Raul Enrique Martínez	Mexico	4:07.45	Q
8	Sebastián Arango	Colombia	4:08.01	Q
9	Carlos Vivero	Colombia	4:09.29	
10	Evan Marcus	Guatemala	4:13.09	
11	Branden Whitehurst	Virgin Islands	4:19.38	
12	Omar Núñez	Nicaragua	4:21.93	
--	Shaune Fraser	Cayman Islands	DNS	
