= Swimming at the 2007 Pan American Games – Men's 200 metre butterfly =

The Men's 200m Butterfly event at the 2007 Pan American Games took place at the Maria Lenk Aquatic Park in Rio de Janeiro, Brazil, with the final being swum on July 21.

== Medalists ==
Gold	Kaio Almeida; Brazil
Silver	Eddie Erazo; United States
Bronze	Juan Veloz; Mexico

== Results ==
Rank	Swimmer	Heats		Semifinals		Final
Rank	Swimmer	Time	Rank	Time	Rank	Time
1	Kaio Almeida (BRA)	2:00.56	4	1:57.99	1	1:55.45
2	Eddie Erazo (USA)	2:00.22	2	1:58.41	2	1:57.07
3	Juan Veloz (MEX)	2:00.71	7	1:59.99	6	1:58.43
4	Jeremey Knowles (BAH)	2:00.60	5	1:59.51	4	1:58.48
5	Adam Sioui (CAN)	2:00.60	5	1:59.92	5	1:58.63
6	Pat Cary (USA)	2:00.27	3	2:00.36	7	1:59.06
7	Stefan Hirniak (CAN)	2:00.15	1	1:59.29	3	1:59.11
8	Omar Pinzón (COL)	2:02.11	8	2:00.88	6	2:00.92
9	Emmanuel Crescimbeni (PER)	2:02.13	9	2:01.09	9	
10	Lucas Salatta (BRA)	2:03.58	13	2:01.22	10	
11	Julio Galofre (COL)	2:03.45	12	2:03.68	11	
12	Javier Hernández Maradiaga (HON)	2:03.19	11	2:04.42	12	
13	Jorge Arturo Arce (CRC)	2:05.42	15	2:04.80	13	
14	Gastón Rodríguez (ARG)	2:02.72	10	2:04.95	14	
15	Roy Barahona (HON)	2:03.60	14	2:05.03	15	
16	Mariano Caviglia (ARG)	2:06.60	16	2:07.40	16	
17	Brad Hamilton (JAM)	2:08.25	17			
18	Ryan Nelthropp (ISV)	2:09.19	18			
19	Omar Nuñez (NCA)	2:13.21	19			
—	Leopoldo Andara (VEN)	DNS	—			
—	Shaune Fraser (CAY)	DNS	—			
—	Bradley Ally (BAR)	DNS	—			
—	Matthew Houllier (TRI)	DNS	—			
