= Swimming at the 2006 Central American and Caribbean Games – Women's 200 metre breaststroke =

The Women's 200m Breaststroke event at the 2006 Central American and Caribbean Games occurred on July 17, 2006 at the S.U. Pedro de Heredia Aquatic Complex in Cartagena, Colombia.

== Records ==
World Record	Leisel Jones (AUS)	2:21.72	2005-07-29	Montreal, Canada
CAC Record	Adriana Marmolejo (MEX)	2:37.12	1998-08-10	(Venezuela) Maracaibo

== Results ==
=== Final ===
Place	Swimmer	Country	Time	Note
1	Adriana Marmolejo	Mexico	2:34.59	GR
2	Alia Atkinson	Jamaica	2:38.31	
3	Daniela Victoria	Venezuela	2:39.81	
4	Alba Álvarez	Mexico	2:41.54	
5	Corina Gonçalves	Venezuela	2:44.59	
6	Alicia Lightbourne	Bahamas	2:45.22	
7	Kimba Collymore	Trinidad and Tobago	2:49.42	
8	Monica Álvarez	Colombia	2:53.09	

=== Preliminaries ===
Rank	Swimmer	Country	Time	Note
1	Adriana Marmolejo	Mexico	2:37.99	Q
2	Alba Álvarez	Mexico	2:39.12	Q
3	Alia Atkinson	Jamaica	2:41.66	Q
4	Daniela Victoria	Venezuela	2:42.85	Q
5	Corina Gonçalves	Venezuela	2:45.19	Q
6	Alicia Lightbourne	Bahamas	2:45.55	Q
7	Kimba Collymore	Trinidad and Tobago	2:47.49	Q
8	Monica Álvarez	Colombia	2:50.76	Q
9	Alexis Jordan	Barbados	2:51.81	
10	Adrienne Indira Fraser	Aruba	2:53.68	
11	Teisha Lightbourne	Bahamas	2:53.84	
12	Danielle Beaubrun	Saint Lucia	2:54.23	
13	Chinyere Pigot	Suriname	2:59.43	
--	Nilshaira Isenia	Netherlands Antilles	DNS	
