= Swimming at the 2006 Central American and Caribbean Games – Women's 100 metre breaststroke =

Women's 100m Breaststroke event

The Women's 100m Breaststroke event at the 2006 Central American and Caribbean Games took place on Tuesday, July 18, 2006, at the S.U. Pedro de Heredia Aquatic Complex in Cartagena, Colombia.

== Records ==
World Record	Jessica Hardy (USA)	1:06.20	2005-07-25	Montreal, Canada
CAC Record	Kenia Puertas (VEN)	1:12.19	1998-08-12	(Venezuela) Maracaibo

== Results ==
=== Final ===
Rank	Swimmer	Country	Time	Note
1	Alia Atkinson	Jamaica	1:12.24	
2	Adriana Marmolejo	Mexico	1:12.41	
3	Daniela Victoria	Venezuela	1:14.70	
4	Kimba Collymore	Trinidad and Tobago	1:16.42	
5	Alicia Lightbourne	Bahamas	1:16.74	
6	Danielle Beaubrun	Saint Lucia	1:17.28	
7	Betsmara Cruz	Puerto Rico	1:17.54	
8	Alba Álvarez	Mexico	1:19.37	

=== Preliminaries ===
Rank	Swimmer	Country	Time	Note
1	Alia Atkinson	Jamaica	1:14.16	Q
2	Adriana Marmolejo	Mexico	1:15.50	Q
3	Alicia Lightbourne	Bahamas	1:16.53	Q
3	Betsmara Cruz	Puerto Rico	1:16.53	Q
5	Alba Álvarez	Mexico	1:16.82	Q
6	Daniela Victoria	Venezuela	1:16.95	Q
7	Kimba Collymore	Trinidad and Tobago	1:17.06	Q
8	Danielle Beaubrun	Saint Lucia	1:17.15	Q
9	Corina Goncalves Ferreira	Venezuela	1:18.28	
10	Alexis Jordan	Barbados	1:18.97	
11	Teisha Lightbourne	Bahamas	1:19.99	
12	Monica Álvarez	Colombia	1:22.11	
13	Adrienne Indira Fraser	Aruba	1:22.32	
14	Chinyere Pigot	Suriname	1:23.23	
--	Nilshaira Isenia	Netherlands Antilles	DNS	
