= Swimming at the 2006 Central American and Caribbean Games – Men's 800 metre freestyle =

The men's 800m Freestyle event at the 2006 Central American and Caribbean Games occurred on Tuesday, July 18, 2006, at the S.U. Pedro de Heredia Aquatic Complex in Cartagena, Colombia. This was a time-final event, meaning that the swimmers only swam it once and whatever their time from that swim was then used for the final ranking.

== Records ==
World Record	Grant Hackett (AUS)	7:38.65	2005-07-27	(Canada) Montreal
CAC Record	—	—	—	—

== Results ==
Place	Swimmer	Country	Time	Note
1	Iván López	Mexico	8:07.30	GR, NR
2	Ricardo Monasterio	Venezuela	8:11.58	
3	Erwin Maldonado	Venezuela	8:21.66	
4	Luis Enrique González	Mexico	8:28.54	
5	Raul Enrique Martínez	Puerto Rico	8:30.45	
6	Mario Montoya	Costa Rica	8:33.29	
7	Evan Marcus	Guatemala	8:35.34	
8	Mateo de Angulo	Colombia	8:35.40	
9	Micky van der Vaart	Aruba	8:38.88	
10	Carlos Vivero	Colombia	8:47.48	
