= Swimming at the 2006 Central American and Caribbean Games – Men's 200 metre freestyle =

The men's 200m Freestyle event at the 2006 Central American and Caribbean Games occurred on Wednesday, July 19, 2006, at the S.U. Pedro de Heredia Aquatic Complex in Cartagena, Colombia.

== Records ==
World Record	Ian Thorpe (AUS)	1:44.06	2001-07-25	(Japan) Fukuoka
CAC Record	Alberto Mestre (VEN)	1:51.71	1982-08-12	(Cuba) Havana

== Results ==
=== Final ===
Place	Swimmer	Country	Time	Note
1	Shaune Fraser	Cayman Islands	1:49.81	GR
2	Ivan López	Mexico	1:51.16	
3	George Bovell	Trinidad and Tobago	1:52.03	
4	Juan Yeh	Mexico	1:52.59	
5	Erwin Maldonado	Venezuela	1:53.47	
6	Raúl Enrique Martínez	Puerto Rico	1:54.79	
7	Mario Montoya	Costa Rica	1:55.65	
8	Nicholas Bovell	Trinidad and Tobago	1:56.65	

=== Preliminaries ===
Rank	Swimmer	Country	Time	Note
1	Shaune Fraser	Cayman Islands	1:52.96	Q
2	Juan Yeh	Mexico	1:53.36	Q
3	Ivan López	Mexico	1:53.84	Q
4	Erwin Maldonado	Venezuela	1:53.85	Q
5	George Bovell	Trinidad and Tobago	1:54.32	Q
6	Mario Montoya	Costa Rica	1:54.93	Q
7	Raúl Enrique Martínez	Puerto Rico	1:55.27	Q
8	Nicholas Bovell	Trinidad and Tobago	1:55.45	Q
9	Sebastián Arango	Colombia	1:56.18	
10	Carlos Vivero	Colombia	1:56.31	
11	Ricardo Monasterio	Venezuela	1:56.56	
12	Kieran Locke	Virgin Islands	1:56.73	
13	Antonio Hernández	Cuba	1:58.37	
14	Shawn Clarke	Barbados	1:59.09	
15	Jonathon Wong	Jamaica	1:59.64	
16	Morgan Locke	Virgin Islands	2:00.35	
17	Brett Fraser	Cayman Islands	2:01.43	
18	Evan Marcus	Guatemala	2:02.41	
