= Swimming at the 2006 Central American and Caribbean Games – Women's 50 metre breaststroke =

The Women's 50m Breaststroke event at the 2006 Central American and Caribbean Games occurred on Tuesday, July 18, 2006, at the S.U. Pedro de Heredia Aquatic Complex in Cartagena, Colombia.

== Records ==
World Record	Jade Edmistone (AUS)	30.45	2005-07-31	Montreal, Canada
CAC Record	—	—	—	—

== Results ==
=== Final ===
Place	Swimmer	Country	Time	Note
1	Alia Atkinson	Jamaica	32.64	GR
2	Adriana Marmolejo	Mexico	33.92	
3	Daniela Victoria	Venezuela	34.08	
4	Danielle Beaubrun	Saint Lucia	34.23	
5	Monica Álvarez	Colombia	34.75	
6	Kimba Collymore	Trinidad and Tobago	34.94	
7	Corina Gonçalves	Venezuela	34.96	
8	Betsmara Cruz	Puerto Rico	35.02	

=== Preliminaries ===
Rank	Swimmer	Country	Time	Note
1	Alia Atkinson	Jamaica	33.51	Q, GR
2	Adriana Marmolejo	Mexico	34.26	Q
3	Danielle Beaubrun	Saint Lucia	34.45	Q
4	Betsmara Cruz	Puerto Rico	34.67	Q
5	Daniela Victoria	Venezuela	34.72	Q
6	Monica Álvarez	Colombia	35.24	Q
7	Kimba Collymore	Trinidad and Tobago	35.40	Q
8	Corina Gonçalves	Venezuela	35.63	Q
8	Laura Alicia Morales	Mexico	35.63	
10	Teisha Lightbourne	Bahamas	35.68	
11	Adrienne Indira Fraser	Aruba	38.29	
12	Chinyere Pigot	Suriname	39.14	
--	Nilshaira Isenia	Netherlands Antilles	DNS	
