= Scanavino =

Scanavino is a surname. Notable people with the surname include:

- Antonella Scanavino (born 1992), Uruguayan swimmer, daughter of Carlos
- Carlos Scanavino (born 1964), Uruguayuan swimmer
- Emilio Scanavino (1922–1986), Italian painter and sculptor
- Peter Scanavino (born 1980), American actor
