= Imaday Núñez =

Cuban swimmer (born 1983)

Personal information
- Full name: Imaday Núñez González
- National team: Cuba
- Born: 18 January 1983 (age 43) Havana, Cuba
- Height: 1.58 m (5 ft 2 in)
- Weight: 52 kg (115 lb)

Sport
- Sport: Swimming
- Strokes: Breaststroke
Medal record
Women's swimming
Representing Cuba
Central American and Caribbean Games
Gold medal – first place	1998 Maracaibo	4×100 m medley
Silver medal – second place	1998 Maracaibo	100 m breaststroke
Bronze medal – third place	1998 Maracaibo	200 m breaststroke

Imaday Núñez González (born January 18, 1983) is a Cuban former swimmer, who specialized in breaststroke events. She won a total of three medals (gold, silver, and bronze) in the breaststroke (both 100 and 200 m) and medley relay at the 1998 Central American and Caribbean Games in Maracaibo, Venezuela.

Nunez became one of Cuba's first ever female swimmers to compete at the 2000 Summer Olympics in Sydney. There, she failed to reach the semifinals in any of her individual events, finishing thirty-first in the 100 m breaststroke (1:13.91) and thirty-fourth in the 200 m breaststroke (2:41.97).

At the 2004 Summer Olympics in Athens, Nunez competed again in the same programs as her first stint. She posted FINA B-standard entry times of 1:13.25 (100 m breaststroke) and 2:34.10 (200 m breaststroke) from the Pan American Games in Santo Domingo, Dominican Republic. In the 100 m breaststroke, Nunez challenged seven other swimmers on the second heat, including 13-year-old Yip Tsz Wa of Hong Kong. She blasted a Cuban record of 1:12.14 to earn a second spot and twenty-seventh overall behind winner Inna Kapishina of Belarus by a 1.48-second margin. In her second event, 200 m breaststroke, Nunez placed twenty-eighth on the morning's preliminaries. Swimming in the same heat as her first, she rounded out a field of six swimmers to last place by three tenths of a second (0.30) behind Mexico's Adriana Marmolejo, outside her entry time of 2:36.40.
