= Kukors =

Kukors is a surname. Notable people with the surname include:

- Ariana Kukors (born 1989), American swimmer
- Emily Kukors (born 1985), American swimmer
