= List of Surinamese records in swimming =

The Suriname Records in Swimming are the fastest times ever swum by an individual from Suriname. These national records are maintained by Suriname's swimming federation: Surinaamse Zwem Bond (SZB).

SZB keeps records for both for males and females, for events swum in long (50m) and short (25m) course pools. Records are kept in the following events (by stroke):

- freestyle (free): 50, 100, 200, 400, 800, 1000 (25m only) and 1500;
- backstroke (back): 50, 100 and 200;
- breaststroke (breast): 50, 100 and 200;
- butterfly (fly): 50, 100 and 200;
- individual medley (I.M.): 100 (25m only), 200 and 400;
- relays: 4x50 free, 4x100 free, 4x200 free, 4x50 medley, and 4 × 100 medley.

All records were achieved in finals unless otherwise specified.

== Long course (50m) ==
=== Men ===
Event	Time		Name	Club	Date	Meet	Location	Ref
50 m freestyle	21.88		Renzo Tjon A Joe	De Dolfijn	9 April 2023	Eindhoven Qualification Meet	Eindhoven, Netherlands	
100 m freestyle	48.80		Renzo Tjon A Joe	De Dolfijn	19 June 2022	Dutch Championships	Amersfoort, Netherlands	
200 m freestyle	1:57.25		Mike Fung A Wing	De Witte Lotus	10 August 1999	-		
400 m freestyle	4:16.65		Yael Touw Ngie Tjouw	Suriname	26 June 2015	XXIX CCCAN	Bridgetown, Barbados	
800 m freestyle	9:14.16		Angelo Ferrier	De Dolfijn	21 April 2001	-		
1500 m freestyle	17:18.15		Angelo Ferrier	De Dolfijn	24 July 2000	-		
50 m backstroke	27.25		Diguan Pigot	Suriname	25 June 2012	CISC	Savaneta, Aruba	
100 m backstroke	58.31		Mike Fung A Wing	Athens Bulldogs	14 July 2000	Texas Senior Circuit Championships	Austin, United States	
200 m backstroke	2:10.05	h	Mike Fung A Wing	Athens Bulldogs	28 March 2000	USA Spring Nationals	Federal Way, United States	
50m breaststroke	28.84	h	Rafael Van Leeuwaarde	Suriname	10 March 2017	Southern Zone Speedo Sectionals	Plantation, United States	
100m breaststroke	1:04.36	h	Rafael Van Leeuwaarde	Suriname	11 March 2017	Southern Zone Speedo Sectionals	Plantation, United States	
200m breaststroke	2:24.76	h	Ansel Tjin A Tam	Suriname	25 July 2001	World Championships	Fukuoka, Japan	
50m butterfly	24.35		Renzo Tjon A Joe	Suriname	30 June 2016	CISC	Nassau, Bahamas	
100m butterfly	53.00		Anthony Nesty	Suriname	21 September 1988	Olympic Games	Seoul, South Korea	
200m butterfly	2:00.17	h	Anthony Nesty	Suriname	22 September 1988	Olympic Games	Seoul, South Korea	
200m individual medley	2:09.73	h	Diguan Pigot	Vos	29 June 2011	CCCAN	Mayagüez, Puerto Rico	
400m individual medley	4:46.60		Diguan Pigot	Vos	24 April 2011	CARIFTA Championships	Wildey, Barbados	
4×50m freestyle relay	1:35.30		Raiz Tjon A Joe; Juan Limburg; Irvin Hoost; Zuhayr Pigot	Suriname	7 April 2015	CARIFTA Championships	Bridgetown, Barbados	
4×100m freestyle relay	3:37.44		Irvin Hoost; Enrico Molly; Wendell Zinhagel; Yael Touw Ngie Tjouw,	Suriname	29 June 2017	CCCAN	Couva, Trinidad and Tobago	
4×200m freestyle relay	8:18.28		Irvin Hoost; Enrico Molly; Wendell Zinhagel; Yael Touw Ngie Tjouw	Suriname	1 July 2017	CCCAN	Couva, Trinidad and Tobago	
4×50m medley relay	1:56.10			Neptunes	30 May 2004	-		
4×100m medley relay	4:00.03		Diguan Pigot; Rafael van Leeuwaarde; Haneef Amatngalim; Renzo Tjon A Joe	Suriname	23 June 2012	CISC	Savaneta, Aruba	

Legend: # – Record awaiting ratification by SZB; WR – World record; AM – Americas record;
Records not set in finals: h – heat; sf – semifinal; r – relay 1st leg; rh – relay heat 1st leg; b – B final; † – en route to final mark; so – swim-off; tt – time trial

=== Women ===
Event	Time		Name	Club	Date	Meet	Location	Ref
50m freestyle	25.76	h	Chinyere Pigot	Suriname	17 July 2015	Pan American Games	Toronto, Canada	
100m freestyle	56.89	h	Chinyere Pigot	Vos	17 June 2011	GCST Summer Open	Florida, United States	
200m freestyle	2:03.22		Carolyn Adel	Suriname	10 August 1998	Central American & Caribbean Games	Maracaibo, Venezuela	
400m freestyle	4:19.03		Carolyn Adel	Suriname	12 August 1998	Central American & Caribbean Games	Maracaibo, Venezuela	
800m freestyle	8:52.57		Carolyn Adel	Suriname	12 August 1998	Central American & Caribbean Games	Maracaibo, Venezuela	
1500m freestyle								
50m backstroke	30.59		Brienne Renburm	Suriname	22 April 2014	CARIFTA	Savaneta, Aruba	
100m backstroke	1:04.93		Carolyn Adel	Suriname	11 August 1998	Central American & Caribbean Games	Maracaibo, Venezuela	
200m backstroke	2:35.29	h	Chandel Domaso	Metro Miami	21 March 2010	USA Sectional Meet	Fort Lauderdale, United States	
50m breaststroke	32.44		Evita Leter	Suriname	1 July 2016	CISC	Nassau, Bahamas	
100m breaststroke	1:12.99		Evita Leter	Suriname	2 July 2016	CISC	Nassau, Bahamas	
200m breaststroke	2:47.34		Evita Leter	Suriname	30 March 2013	CARIFTA Championships	Kingston, Jamaica	
50m butterfly	28.94	h	Chinyere Pigot	Vos	2 July 2011	CCCAN	Mayagüez, Puerto Rico	
100m butterfly	1:03.66		Carolyn Adel	Neptunes	6 July 1997	-		
200m butterfly	2:18.27		Carolyn Adel	Suriname	12 August 1998	Central American & Caribbean Games	Maracaibo, Venezuela	
200m individual medley	2:19.31		Carolyn Adel	Suriname	12 August 1998	Central American & Caribbean Games	Maracaibo, Venezuela	
400m individual medley	4:52.42		Carolyn Adel	Suriname	10 August 1998	Central American & Caribbean Games	Maracaibo, Venezuela	
4×50m freestyle relay	1:52.87		Chinyére Pigot; Karlene van der Jagt (56.91); Ashley Chong; Chandel Domaso (55.96)	Suriname	3 April 2010	CARIFTA Championships	Kingston, Jamaica	
4×100m freestyle relay	4:09.20		Chandel Domaso (1:01.49); Karlene van der Jagt (1:04.34); Ashley Chong (1:04.22); Chinyére Pigot (59.15)	Suriname	3 April 2010	CARIFTA Championships	Kingston, Jamaica	
4×200m freestyle relay	9:04.86		Chandel Domaso (2:15.31); Ashley Chong (2:22.48); Chinyére Pigot (2:12.02); Karlene van der Jagt (2:15.05)	Suriname	5 April 2010	CARIFTA Championships	Kingston, Jamaica	
4×50m medley relay	2:13.70			Neptunes	14 July 1986	-		
4×100m medley relay	4:50.53		Ashley Chong; Evita Leter; Karlene van der Jagt; Chinyére Pigot	Suriname	23 April 2011	-		

Legend: # – Record awaiting ratification by SZB; WR – World record; AM – Americas record;
Records not set in finals: h – heat; sf – semifinal; r – relay 1st leg; rh – relay heat 1st leg; b – B final; † – en route to final mark; so – swim-off; tt – time trial

== Short course (25m) ==
=== Men ===
Event	Time		Name	Club	Date	Meet	Location	Ref
50m freestyle	21.22		Renzo Tjon-A-Joe	De Dolfijn	2 July 2022	Speedo Fast Water Meet	Amsterdam, Netherlands	
100m freestyle	47.03		Renzo Tjon-A-Joe	De Dolfijn	3 July 2022	Speedo Fast Water Meet	Amsterdam, Netherlands	
200m freestyle	1:52.84		Mike Fung A Wing	De Witte Lotus	10 August 1999	-		
400m freestyle	4:14.62		Angelo Ferrier	De Dolfijn	12 May 2001	-		
800m freestyle	8:39.47		Angelo Ferrier	De Dolfijn	12 May 2001	-		
1000m freestyle	11:10.60		Anthony Nesty	De Dolfijn	23 April 1984	-		
1500m freestyle	18:05.50		Niko Kluyver	Oase	15 March 1980	-		
50m backstroke	26.89		Renzo Tjon-A-Joe	Oase	16 May 2013	Surinamese Championships	Paramaribo, Suriname	
100m backstroke	58.01		Diguan Pigot	Vos	18 December 2011	VOS Powerade Invitational	Paramaribo, Suriname	
200m backstroke	2:06.96		Mike Fung A Wing	De Witte Lotus	17 October 1999	-		
50m breaststroke	28.13	h	Rafael Van Leeuwaarde	De Dolfijn	6 December 2014	World Championships	Doha, Qatar	
100m breaststroke	1:01.32	h	Rafael van Leeuwaarde	De Dolfijn	3 December 2014	World Championships	Doha, Qatar	
200m breaststroke	2:16.83	h	Rafael van Leeuwaarde	De Dolfijn	5 December 2014	World Championships	Doha, Qatar	
50m butterfly	24.48	h	Renzo Tjon-A-Joe	Oase	5 December 2014	World Championships	Doha, Qatar	
100m butterfly	54.68	h	Zuhayr Pigot	Suriname	4 December 2014	World Championships	Doha, Qatar	
200m butterfly	2:09.21		Raiz Tjon A Joe	De Dolfijn	16 May 2013	Surinamese Championships	Paramaribo, Suriname	
100m I.M.	58.70		Jair Boerenveen	Oase	27 May 2010	Surinamese Championships	Paramaribo, Suriname	
200m I.M.	2:06.19		Diguan Pigot	Vos	17 December 2011	VOS Powerade Invitational	Paramaribo, Suriname	
400m I.M.	4:40.12		Gordon Touw Ngie Tjouw	Vos	9 May 2003	-		
4×50m freestyle relay	1:36.97		Angelo Ferrier; Renzo Tjon A Joe; Jair Boerenveen; Moses Rickets	Oase	12 June 2011	Giovanni Linscheer Memorial	Paramaribo, Suriname	
4×100m freestyle relay	3:42.52			Dolfijn		-		
4×200m freestyle relay	8:28.19			Oase		-		
4×50m medley relay	1:48.56		Diguan Pigot; Given Pinas; Marcelino Richaards; Ziame Saakie	Vos	18 December 2010	-		
4×100m medley relay	4:03.07		Marcelino Richaards; Diguan Pigot; Ziame Saakie; Given Pinas	Vos	12 June 2010	Giovanni Linscheer Memorial	Paramaribo, Suriname	

Legend: # – Record awaiting ratification by SZB; WR – World record; AM – Americas record;
Records not set in finals: h – heat; sf – semifinal; r – relay 1st leg; rh – relay heat 1st leg; b – B final; † – en route to final mark; so – swim-off; tt – time trial

=== Women ===
Event	Time		Name	Club	Date	Meet	Location	Ref
50m freestyle	25.11	h	Chinyere Pigot	Vos	6 December 2014	World Championships	Doha, Qatar	
100m freestyle	55.55	h	Chinyere Pigot	Vos	4 December 2014	World Championships	Doha, Qatar	
200m freestyle	2:08.20		Chandel Domaso	Vos	23 March 2012	Oase 200m & 400m Wedstrijden		
400m freestyle	4:41.62		Karlene van der Jagt	De Witte Lotus	4 April 2009	-		
800m freestyle	9:44.43		Carolyn Adel	Neptunes	12 April 1993	-		
1000m freestyle	12:08.95		Carolyn Adel	Neptunes	12 April 1993	-		
1500m freestyle	21:01.10		Pauline Nesty	De Dolfijn	15 March 1980	-		
50m backstroke	29.62		Xiomara Getrouw	De Dolfijn	9 July 2017	Speedo Fast Water Meet	Amsterdam, Netherlands	
100m backstroke	1:05.34		Brienne Renfrum	De Dolfijn	18 May 2013	Surinamese Championships	Paramaribo, Suriname	
200m backstroke	2:27.61		Brienne Renfrum	De Dolfijn	17 May 2013	Surinamese Championships	Paramaribo, Suriname	
50m breaststroke	34.63		Candis Pique	Oase	15 June 2012	13th Giovanni Linscheer Memorial	Paramaribo, Suriname	
100m breaststroke			Carolyn Adel	Neptunes	1 January 1998	-		
200m breaststroke	2:50.03		Sade Daal	Neptunes	4 March 2003	-		
50m butterfly	29.22	h	Xiomara Getrouw	De Dolfijn	29 June 2019	Speedo Fast Water Meet	Amsterdam, Netherlands	
100m butterfly	1:05.29		Carolyn Adel	Neptunes	19 December 1998	-		
200m butterfly	2:31.51		Ashley Chong	De Witte Lotus	19 March 2010	Oase Meet	Suriname	
100m I.M.	1:09.71		Chantel Peiter	Vos	15 May 2014	Surinamese Championships	Paramaribo, Suriname	
200m I.M.	2:15.26		Carolyn Adel	ASU	16 March 2000	NCAA Women's Div. I Championships	Indianapolis, United States	
400m I.M.	4:45.31		Carolyn Adel	ASU	17 March 2000	NCAA Women's Div. I Championships	Indianapolis, United States	
4×50m freestyle relay	1:56.23		Chandel Domaso; Brienne Renfurm; Candis Pique; Chinyere Pigot	Vos	19 December 2009	-		
4×100m freestyle relay	4:18.82		Karlene van der Jagt; Soraya van Dijk; Xaenne Tjoen A Choy; Ashley Chong	De Witte Lotus	18 January 2009	-		
4×200m freestyle relay	9:19.66			De Witte Lotus	4 April 2009			
4×50m medley relay	2:10.70			Neptunes/ De Dolfijn	26 July 1986	-		
4×100m medley relay	4:29.27			De Dolfijn	21 January 2011	-	Suriname	

Legend: # – Record awaiting ratification by SZB; WR – World record; AM – Americas record;
Records not set in finals: h – heat; sf – semifinal; r – relay 1st leg; rh – relay heat 1st leg; b – B final; † – en route to final mark; so – swim-off; tt – time trial
