= Yohan García =

Cuban swimmer (born 1982)

Personal information
- Born: March 24, 1982 (age 44)

Sport
- Sport: Swimming
Medal record
Representing Cuba
Central American and Caribbean Games
Gold medal – first place	1998 Maracaibo	4x100m medley relay
Silver medal – second place	1998 Maracaibo	4x100m freestyle relay

Yohan García (born 24 March 1982) is a former Cuban swimmer who competed in the 2000 Summer Olympics.
