= Juan Veloz =

Mexican swimmer (born 1982)

Personal information
- Full name: Juan José Veloz Dávila
- National team: Mexico
- Born: 24 September 1982 (age 43) Mexico City, Mexico
- Height: 6 ft 1 in (185 cm)
- Weight: 80 kg (176 lb)

Sport
- Sport: Swimming
- Strokes: Butterfly, medley
- College team: University of Arizona (U.S.)
Medal record
Men's swimming
Representing Mexico
Pan American Games
Bronze medal – third place	2007 Rio de Janeiro	200 m butterfly
Central American and Caribbean Games
Gold medal – first place	2002 San Salvador	200 m butterfly
Gold medal – first place	2002 San Salvador	400 m medley
Gold medal – first place	2002 San Salvador	4×200 m freestyle
Gold medal – first place	2006 Cartagena	200 m butterfly
Gold medal – first place	2006 Cartagena	4×200 m freestyle
Silver medal – second place	1998 Maracaibo	200 m butterfly

Juan José Veloz Dávila (born 24 September 1982 in Mexico City, Mexico) is an Olympic and national record-holding swimmer for Mexico. He swam for his native country at the 2000, 2004, and 2008 Olympics.

== Career ==
At the 2002 Central American and Caribbean Games, Veloz set the Games Record in the 200 fly at 1:58.45.

As of March 2008, he holds the Mexican records in the 200 fly and 400 IM. In 2007 he won bronze medal in the Panamerican Games.
