= Joshua Ilika Brenner =

Mexican swimmer (born 1976)

Josh Ilika
Personal information
- Full name: Joshua Brenner Ilika
- Nationality: Mexico
- Born: September 14, 1976 (age 49) Celaya, Guanajuato
- Height: 190 cm (6 ft 3 in)

Sport
- Sport: Swimming
- Strokes: Free, Fly
- Club: Longhorn Aquatics (USA); San Luis Potsí (Mexico)
- College team: USC Trojans
Medal record
Representing Mexico
Central American and Caribbean Games
Gold medal – first place	2002 San Salvador	200m freestyle
Gold medal – first place	2002 San Salvador	4x200m freestyle relay
Gold medal – first place	2002 San Salvador	4x100m medley relay
Silver medal – second place	2002 San Salvador	4x100m freestyle relay
Bronze medal – third place	1998 Maracaibo	400m freestyle
Bronze medal – third place	2002 San Salvador	100m freestyle

Joshua Brenner Ilika (born September 14, 1976 in Celaya, Guanajuato) is a Mexican butterfly and freestyle swimmer, who began swimming at the age of three. He participated in the 2000 and 2004 Summer Olympics.

== See also ==
- List of Mexican records in swimming
