= Emmanuel Crescimbeni =

Peruvian swimmer

Personal information
- Full name: José Emmanuel Crescimbeni Barrantes
- National team: Peru
- Born: June 25, 1990 (age 36) Gaithersburg, Maryland, U.S.
- Height: 1.75 m (5 ft 9 in)
- Weight: 73 kg (161 lb)

Sport
- Sport: Swimming
- Strokes: Butterfly
- Club: St. Petersburg Aquatics (U.S.)
- College team: University of Florida (U.S.)
- Coach: Gregg Troy (U.S.)

José Emmanuel Crescimbeni Barrantes (born June 25, 1990) is an American-born competition swimmer who has represented Peru in international events, specializing in the butterfly. He represented his parents' homeland Peru at the 2008 Summer Olympics and has currently owned Peruvian records in both the 100 and 200 m butterfly. While residing in the United States, Crescimbeni claimed the 2007 Florida High School state championship title in his signature events, and later served as a member of the Florida Gators swimming and diving team under head coach Gregg Troy.

Crescimbeni competed as Peru's lone male swimmer in the 200 m butterfly at the 2008 Summer Olympics in Beijing. He scored a ninth-place time in 2:01.09 to clear the FINA B-cut (2:01.80) at the 2007 Pan American Games in Rio de Janeiro, Brazil. Swimming in heat one, Crescimbeni held off a hard-charging Javier Hernández Maradiaga of Honduras by a tenth of a second (0.1) to snatch the third spot in 2:02.13. Crescimbeni failed to advance to the semifinals, as he placed forty-first overall in the prelims.
