= Iván López (swimmer) =

Mexican swimmer (born 1984)

Personal information
- Full name: Iván de Jesús López Ramos
- Nationality: Mexican
- Born: 12 April 1984 (age 42) Guadalajara, Jalisco
- Height: 1.86 m (6 ft 1 in)

Sport
- Sport: Swimming
- Strokes: Freestyle
Medal record
Men's swimming
Representing Mexico
Central American and Caribbean Games
Gold medal – first place	2006 Cartagena	400 m freestyle
Gold medal – first place	2006 Cartagena	800 m freestyle
Gold medal – first place	2006 Cartagena	4×200 m freestyle
Silver medal – second place	2006 Cartagena	200 m freestyle
Silver medal – second place	2006 Cartagena	1500 m freestyle
Silver medal – second place	2006 Cartagena	4×100 m freestyle

Iván López (born 12 April 1984) is a National Record holding distance swimmer from Mexico. He has swum for Mexico at:

- 2006: Central American and Caribbean Games
- 2007: Pan American Games
- 2008: Open Water Worlds
- 2009: World Championships

At the 2006 Central American and Caribbean Games, he set the Mexican Record in winning the men's 800 free in 8:07.30. The time was also a Games Record.
