= Sonia Álvarez =

Puerto Rican swimmer (born 1976)

Personal information
- Born: 10 April 1976 (age 50)

Sport
- Sport: Swimming
Medal record
Representing Puerto Rico
Central American and Caribbean Games
| Gold medal – first place | 2002 San Salvador | 400m freestyle |
| Gold medal – first place | 2002 San Salvador | 400m individual medley |
| Gold medal – first place | 2002 San Salvador | 4x200m freestyle relay |
| Bronze medal – third place | 2002 San Salvador | 4x100m medley relay |

Sonia Álvarez (born 10 April 1976) is a Puerto Rican swimmer. She competed in two events at the 1996 Summer Olympics.
