= Diguan Pigot =

Surinamese swimmer

Personal information
- Born: June 24, 1994 (age 32) Paramaribo, Suriname

Sport
- Sport: Swimming
- Strokes: Breaststroke

Diguan Pigot (born June 24, 1994) is a Surinamese swimmer. At the 2012 Summer Olympics, he competed in the Men's 100 metre breaststroke, finishing in 43rd place in the heats, failing to reach the semifinals.
