= Swimming at the 1998 Central American and Caribbean Games =

The Swimming competition at the 18th Central American and Caribbean Games was swum August 9–15, 1998 in Maracaibo, Venezuela. It featured events in a long course (50m) pool.

== Results ==
=== Men ===
Games	Gold		Silver		Bronze	
50 freestyle	Ricardo Busquets; Puerto Rico	22.55; GR	Francisco Sánchez; Venezuela	22.74	Marcos Hernández; Cuba	23.00
100 freestyle	Francisco Sánchez; Venezuela	50.05; GR	Marcos Hernández; Cuba	50.32	Ricardo Busquets; Puerto Rico	50.42
200 freestyle	Fernando Jácome; Colombia	1:54.28	Oscar Sotelo; Mexico	1:54.43	Ives Garcia; Cuba	1:54.71
400 freestyle	Ricardo Monasterio; Venezuela	3:58.88; GR	Alejandro Bermúdez; Colombia	3:58.89	Josh Ilika; Mexico	3:59.74
1500 freestyle	Ricardo Monasterio; Venezuela	15:57.50	Ives Garcia; Cuba	16:12.42	Ramon Valle; Honduras	16:26.25
100 backstroke	Rodolfo Falcón; Cuba	55.60; GR	Neisser Bent; Cuba	55.79	Ricardo Busquets; Puerto Rico	56.24
200 backstroke	Neisser Bent; Cuba	2:01.53; GR	Carlos Arena; Mexico	2:05.60	Alexis Perdomo; Venezuela	2:05.78
100 breaststroke	Gunter Rodríguez; Cuba	1:04.72	Francisco Suriano; El Salvador	1:04.73	Alvaro Fortuny; Guatemala	1:05.43
200 breaststroke	Gunter Rodríguez; Cuba	2:18.58	Francisco Suriano; El Salvador	2:18.91	Jose Lopez; Mexico	2:21.28
100 butterfly	Francisco Sánchez; Venezuela	53.86	Oswaldo Quevedo; Venezuela	53.93	Ricardo Busquets; Puerto Rico	54.32
200 butterfly	Andrew Livingston; Puerto Rico	2:00.54; GR	Juan Veloz; Mexico	2:01.44	Nelson Mora; Venezuela	2:01.46
200 I.M.	Neisser Bent; Cuba	2:07.12; GR	Gunter Rodríguez; Cuba	2:07.18	Alejandro Bermúdez; Colombia	2:07.50
400 I.M.	Gunter Rodríguez; Cuba	4:26.86; GR	Alejandro Bermúdez; Colombia	4:29.10	Santiago Lima; Mexico	4:34.01
4x100 free relay	Venezuela; Oswaldo Quevedo; Francisco Páez; Luis Rojas; Francisco Sánchez	3:23.49; GR	Cuba; Neisser Bent; Yohan García; Ives García; Marcos Hernández	3:26.91	Mexico; César Barrón; Carlos Arena; Guillermo Díaz; Oscar Sotelo	3:27.50
4x200 free relay	not swum					
4x100 medley relay	Cuba; Rodolfo Falcón; Gunter Rodríguez; Yohan García; Marcos Hernández	3:44.61; GR	Mexico; Carlos Arena; José A. López; Jesús González; César Barrón	3:46.63	Puerto Rico; Ricardo Busquets; Arsenio López; Andrew Livingston; Eduardo González	3:47.23

=== Women ===
Games	Gold		Silver		Bronze	
50 freestyle	Eileen Coparropa; Panama	26.12; GR	Siobhan Cropper (Trinidad and Tobago) Trinidad & Tobago	26.40	Deborah Figueroa; Cuba	26.82
100 freestyle	Eileen Coparropa; Panama	57.60; GR	Deborah Figueroa; Cuba	58.47	Erin Volcán; Venezuela	58.81
200 freestyle	Carolyn Adel; Suriname	2:03.22; NR	Janelle Atkinson; Jamaica	2:05.97	Erin Volcán; Venezuela	2:07.41
400 freestyle	Carolyn Adel; Suriname	4:19.03; NR	Janelle Atkinson; Jamaica	4:20.99	Lucía Jiménez; Guatemala	4:31.09
800 freestyle	Carolyn Adel; Suriname	8:52.57; GR, NR	Janelle Atkinson; Jamaica	8:53.46	Irama Villareal; Mexico	9:08.06
100 backstroke	Carolyn Adel; Suriname	1:04.93; NR	Ana María González; Cuba	1:05.04	Tessa Solomon; Netherlands Antilles	1:07.55
200 backstroke	Ana María González; Cuba	2:19.66	Tania Galindo; Mexico	2:24.97	Irama Villareal; Mexico	2:24.99
100 breaststroke	Kenia Puertas; Venezuela	1:12.19; GR	Imaday Nunez; Cuba	1:13.79	Isabel Ceballos; Colombia	1:14.33
200 breastroke	Adriana Marmolejo; Mexico	2:37.12; GR	Kenia Puertas; Venezuela	2:37.94	Imaday Nunez; Cuba	2:38.95
100 butterfly	Siobhan Cropper (Trinidad and Tobago) Trinidad & Tobago	1:03.01; GR	Melissa Mata; Costa Rica	1:03.56	Paola Espana; Mexico	1:03.78
200 butterfly	Melissa Mata; Costa Rica	2:16.89; GR	Carolyn Adel; Suriname	2:18.27; NR	Paola Espana; Mexico	2:18.73
200 I.M.	Carolyn Adel; Suriname	2:19.31; GR, NR	Sonia Alvarez; Puerto Rico	2:23.64	Isabel Ceballos; Colombia	2:28.56
400 I.M.	Carolyn Adel; Suriname	4:52.42; GR, NR	Sonia Alvarez; Puerto Rico	5:01.38	Irma Villareal; Mexico	5:02.59
4x100 free relay	Puerto Rico; Francheska Salib, Lysandra Álvarez, Vanessa García, Solimar Mojica	4:00.20	Venezuela; Lauren Volcán, Jenny Fuentes, Daniela Aponte, Erin Volcán	4:02.98	Colombia; Catalina Dangond, Ana Uribe, Gloria Díaz, María A. Ortiz	4:07.79
4x200 free relay	Puerto Rico; Solimar Mojica, Lysandra Álvarez, Gretchen Gotay, Sonia Álvarez	8:40.26	Venezuela; Lauren Volcán, Daniela Aponte, Jenny Fuentes, Erin Volcán	8:46.46	Colombia; Ana Uribe, Gloria Díaz, Isabel Ceballos, Catalina Dangond	8:54.41
4x100 medley relay	Cuba; Ana M. González, Imaday Núñez, Mikeila Torres, Déborah Figueroa	4:23.90; GR	Colombia; Carolina Douglas, Isabel Ceballos, Andrea Duarte, Catalina Dangond	4:29.23	Puerto Rico; Elaine López, Francheska Salib, Sonia Álvarez, Vanessa García	4:36.18

=== Medal standings ===
Rank	Nation	Gold	Silver	Bronze	Total
1	Cuba	9	8	4	21
2	Venezuela (VEN)	6	5	4	15
3	Suriname	6	1	0	7
4	Puerto Rico	4	2	5	11
5	Panama	2	0	0	2
6	Mexico	1	5	9	15
7	Colombia	1	3	5	9
8	Costa Rica	1	1	0	2
8	Trinidad and Tobago	1	1	0	2
Totals (9 entries)		31	26	27	84
