= Gunter Rodríguez =

Cuban swimmer (born 1981)

Personal information
- Born: Gunther Rodríguez Osorio; 1981 (age 44–45)

Sport
- Sport: Swimming
Medal record
Representing Cuba
Central American and Caribbean Games
Gold medal – first place	1998 Maracaibo	100m breaststroke
Gold medal – first place	1998 Maracaibo	200m breaststroke
Gold medal – first place	1998 Maracaibo	400m individual medley
Gold medal – first place	1998 Maracaibo	4x100m medley relay
Silver medal – second place	1998 Maracaibo	200m individual medley

Gunther Rodríguez Osorio (born 1981) is a Cuban former swimmer who competed in the 2000 Summer Olympics.
