= Sharntelle McLean =

Trinidad and Tobago swimmer (born 1984)

Personal information
- Full name: Sharntelle S.T.C. McLean
- Nationality: Trinidad and Tobago
- Born: June 1, 1984 (age 42) Trinidad and Tobago

Sport
- Sport: Swimming
- College team: South Carolina Gamecocks (USA) (2005-present)
Medal record
Central American and Caribbean Games
Silver medal – second place	Cartagena 2006	50m Butterfly
Bronze medal – third place	Cartagena 2006	50m Freestyle

Sharntelle Sharon Tamika Cyren McLean (born June 1, 1984) is a 2-time Olympic swimmer from Trinidad and Tobago. She swam for Trinidad and Tobago at the 2004 and 2008 Olympics. Beginning in 2005, she has attended and swam for the United States' University of South Carolina.

In January 2009, she and George Bovell were named the Female and Male Swimmer of the Year for 2008 by Trinidad & Tobago's national swimming federation: the Amateur Swimming Association of Trinidad and Tobago (ASATT). She has received the honor two times before in 2003 and 2004.

She has swum internationally for T&T at the:

- 2002 Commonwealth Games
- 2002 Short Course Worlds
- 2002 Central American and Caribbean Games
- 2003 Pan American Games
- 2003 World Championships
- 2004 Olympics
- 2006 Central American and Caribbean Games
- 2007 World Championships
- 2008 Olympics
