= Emily Kukors =

American swimmer (born 1985)

Personal information
- Full name: Emily Nichole Kukors
- National team: United States
- Born: April 13, 1985 (age 41) Auburn, Washington, U.S.
- Height: 5 ft 9 in (175 cm)
- Weight: 120 lb (54 kg)
- Relatives: Ariana Kukors; Sister, (U. of Washington swimmer)

Sport
- Sport: Swimming
- Strokes: Medley, freestyle
- Club: King Aquatic Club; Auburn Tigers
- College team: Auburn University
- Coach: Sean Hutchinson (King Aquatic); Scott McLaughlin (Auburn High); David Marsh (Auburn U.); Richard Quick (Auburn Univ. Sr. Year)
Medal record
Women's swimming
Representing the United States
Pan American Games
Gold medal – first place	2007 Rio de Janeiro	4×100 m freestyle
Gold medal – first place	2007 Rio de Janeiro	4×200 m freestyle
Silver medal – second place	2007 Rio de Janeiro	200 m medley

Emily Nichole Kukors (born April 13, 1985) is an American former competition swimmer. Graduating Auburn University in 2008, she was a 26-time All-American and a three-time SEC Champion by the end of her Junior year. In a career highlight, Kukors won three medals for her native country at the 2007 Pan American Games in Rio de Janeiro, Brazil, and participated in both the 2004 and 2008 U.S. Olympic trials.

Emily Kukors was born April 13, 1985 in Auburn, Washington to Peter and Jaapje Kukors. From a family of swimmers, her younger sister by four years, Arianna swam for King Aquatic Club and competed for the University of Washington Huskies and would swim in the 2012 Olympics. A gifted swimmer, as a college Freshman Arianna swam for Washington in relay events against Emily at the March, 2008 NCAA championships at Ohio State. In club swimming, Emily, like her sisters Arianna and Mattie, swam for King Aquatic Club under Coach Sean Hutchinson. At Auburn High School, where she graduated in 2003, Emily was coached by Scott McLaughlin.

== 2004 Olympic trials ==
Shortly after High School, Emily participated at the 2004 USA Olympic Team Trials in the 100 free where she swam a 57.05, the 200 freestyle where she swam a 2:04.08, the 100 butterfly where she swam a 1:02.41 and the 200 butterfly where she swam a 2:15.92. She qualified for the 2004 trials in the 200 and 400 Individual Medleys but did not compete in them. At the 2003 Senior National Championships, she finished second in the 200 freestyle.

== Auburn University ==
Emily Kukors attended and swam for Auburn University from around 2004-2008 under Hall of Fame Coach David Marsh and for Richard Quick in her Senior year. Under Marsh, the Auburn women's team was nationally dominant and won NCAA championships in 2003, 2004, 2006, and 2007. In her Sophomore year at Auburn from 2005-6, Kukors received the Auburn Hammer Award for being high point scorer at the NCAA Championships. Through her Junior season at Auburn in 2006-7, Kukors was an All-American 19 times, and was a Southeast Conference Champion three times in events that included the 400 and 800 freestyle events, and the 400 medley relay. In her 2006-7 season at Auburn, she established a new Auburn record in the 200 freestyle with a time of 1:43.72 at the National Collegiate Athletic Association championships.

== 2007 Rio de Janeiro Pan Am Games ==
Swimming for the U.S. National team, Kukors captured three medals at the Rio de Janeiro Pan Am Games in Brazil. Establishing herself as a multi-stroke swimmer, she captured a silver medal in the 200m Individual Medley with a time of 2:13.88. In relay competition, she captured two additional gold medals as part of the freestyle relay teams that won both the 400 meter and 800 meter events. Showing their dominance in the event, the U.S. Women's 800 meter freestyle relay team with Kukors, established a new Pan Am Games record. The U.S. women's 400-meter freestyle relay team were only .04 seconds from establishing a new record.

As the ninth national seed in the 200 IM and the 10th seed in the 200 Butterfly at the 2008 swimming trials in Omaha, Nebraska, for the Beijing Olympics, Kukors swam in the 100 butterfly, 400 freestyle, 200 freestyle, 200 Individual Medley, 200 butterfly and 100 freestyle. She was not expected to qualify for the U.S. team, but demonstrated exceptional stroke diversity in her trials performance.

=== Coaching ===
In March 2010, she became a swim coach for Redlands Swim Team.
