= Heysi Villarreal =

Cuban swimmer (born 1986)

Personal information
- Full name: Heysi Villarreal Navarro
- Nationality: Cuba
- Born: August 26, 1986 (age 39) Havana, Cuba

Sport
- Sport: Swimming
- Strokes: Freestyle

Heysi Villarreal (born 26 August 1986 in Havana, Cuba) is an Olympic and national record holding swimmer from Cuba. She was Cuba's only female swimmer at the 2008 Olympics.

She also represented Cuba at the 2007 World Aquatics Championships.

In March 2008, she lowered the Cuban records in the 200 and 800 frees to 2:03.56 and 9:07.50. She lowered the 200 free time again at the 2008 Olympics (2:03.23).

In April 2008, she was the top athlete at the IV Cuban Sport Olympiad, winning 8 events and finishing second in 2 others.

At the 2008 Caribbean Island Swimming Championships, in the 18-year-old and older age group, she finished: first in the 200, 400 and 800 frees; second in the 100 free, 100 fly and 200 Individual Medley; and third in the 50 free and 50 back.
