= Javier Hernández Maradiaga =

Honduran swimmer (born 1988)

Personal information
- Full name: Javier Hernández Maradiaga
- National team: Honduras
- Born: 8 May 1988 (age 38) Puerto Cortés, Honduras
- Height: 1.74 m (5 ft 9 in)
- Weight: 66 kg (146 lb)

Sport
- Sport: Swimming
- Strokes: Butterfly
- College team: Lindenwood University (U.S.)
- Coach: Craig Penrose (U.S.)

Javier Hernández Maradiaga (born May 8, 1988) is a Honduran swimmer, who specialized in butterfly events. He represented his nation Honduras at the 2008 Summer Olympics, and currently holds a Central American record in the 200 m butterfly. Hernandez also spent his college career in the United States as a member of the Lindenwood Lions swimming and diving team under head coach Craig Penrose while pursuing his major in computer science at Lindenwood University in St. Charles, Missouri.

Hernandez received a Universality invitation from FINA to compete as Honduras' lone male swimmer in the men's 200 m butterfly at the 2008 Summer Olympics in Beijing. Hernandez fired off a 2:02.23 on a high-tech bodysuit to blast a new Honduran record, but could not catch Peru's Emmanuel Crescimbeni to get the fourth spot by just a tenth of a second (0.1), dropping him back to dead-last in the opening heat, and rounding out the roster to forty-second overall in the prelims. In 2015, Hernandez finished 2nd in the country in SIRVA overall with an impressive 4.73 average out of 5.
