= Antonella Scanavino =

Uruguayan swimmer (born 1992)

Personal information
- Full name: Antonella Scanavino Crespo
- National team: Uruguay
- Born: 30 October 1992 (age 33) Maldonado, Uruguay
- Height: 1.66 m (5 ft 5 in)
- Weight: 60 kg (132 lb)

Sport
- Sport: Swimming
- Strokes: Butterfly, medley
- Club: Campus de Maldonado

Antonella Scanavino Crespo (Maldonado, October 30, 1992) is a Uruguayan swimmer, who specialized in butterfly and individual medley events. At age fifteen, she became one of the youngest swimmers to compete at the 2008 Summer Olympics, representing her nation Uruguay. Antonella Scanavino is the daughter of the nation's former long-distance freestyle champion Carlos Scanavino, who won silver at the 1987 Pan American Games in Indianapolis, Indiana, United States, and had appeared in two editions of the Olympic Games (1984 and 1988).

Antonella Scanavino was invited by FINA through the Universality rule to compete as a lone female swimmer for Uruguay in the 100 m butterfly at the 2008 Summer Olympics in Beijing. Swimming against Senegal's Binta Zahra Diop and San Marino's Simona Muccioli in heat one, Antonella Scanavino trailed the Senegalese rival throughout the race to scorch her way for an immediate lead, but could not catch her near the wall by just a small fingertip (0.02 seconds) to finish only with a second-place time and forty-eighth overall in 1:04.28.
