= Hilary Bell (swimmer) =

Canadian swimmer

Personal information
- Full name: Hilary Bell
- Nationality: Canada
- Born: June 18, 1991 (age 35) Toronto, Ontario, Canada
- Height: 1.70 m (5 ft 7 in)
- Weight: 62 kg (137 lb)

Sport
- Sport: Swimming
- Strokes: Freestyle
- Club: Toronto Swim Club
Medal record
Women's swimming
Pan American Games
Silver medal – second place	2007 Rio de Janeiro	4x100 m freestyle
Silver medal – second place	2007 Rio de Janeiro	4x200 m freestyle

Hilary Bell (born June 18, 1991 in Toronto, Ontario) is a female swimmer from Canada, who mostly competes in the freestyle events. She claimed two silver relay medals at the 2007 Pan American Games in Rio de Janeiro, Brazil. Bell represented Canada at the 2006 World Youth Championship in Rio de Janeiro.
