= Carolyn Adel =

Surinamese swimmer

Personal information
- Full name: Carolyn Adel
- National team: Suriname
- Born: 27 August 1978 (age 47) Suriname
- Height: 1.63 m (5 ft 4 in)
- Weight: 52 kg (115 lb)

Sport
- Sport: Swimming
- Strokes: Medley, freestyle
- College team: Arizona State University (USA)
Medal record
Women's swimming
Representing Suriname
Pan American Games
| Bronze medal – third place | Winnipeg 1999 | 400 m medley |
Central American and Caribbean Games
| Gold medal – first place | Maracaibo 1998 | 200 m freestyle |
| Gold medal – first place | Maracaibo 1998 | 400 m freestyle |
| Gold medal – first place | Maracaibo 1998 | 800 m freestyle |
| Gold medal – first place | Maracaibo 1998 | 100 m backstroke |
| Gold medal – first place | Maracaibo 1998 | 200 m medley |
| Gold medal – first place | Maracaibo 1998 | 400 m medley |
| Silver medal – second place | Maracaibo 1998 | 200 m butterfly |

Carolyn Adel (born 27 August 1978) is an Olympic and national record holding swimmer from Suriname. She swam for Suriname at the 1996 and 2000 Olympics.

She was the most decorated swimmer at the 1998 Central American and Caribbean Games, where she won 6 events and set 3 Games Records. She also set 7 Suriname Records, which still stand as of December 2010.

She attended university, and swam for, the USA's Arizona State University.
