= Yanel Pinto =

Venezuelan swimmer (born 1989)

Personal information
- Full name: Yanel Andriana Pinto Pérez
- National team: Venezuela
- Born: 20 May 1989 (age 37) Maracay, Aragua, Venezuela
- Height: 1.72 m (5 ft 8 in)
- Spouse: Bradley Spencer

Sport
- Sport: Swimming
- Strokes: Freestyle, 5k and 10k
Medal record
Pan American Games
Bronze medal – third place	2007 Rio de Janeiro	4x100 free relay
Central American & Caribbean Games
Silver medal – second place	2006 Cartagena	4x200 free relay
Gold medal – first place	2010 Mayagüez	4x200 free relay

Yanel Andriana Pinto Pérez (born 20 May 1989 in Maracay) is an Olympic swimmer from Venezuela. She swam for Venezuela at the 2008 Olympics.

She also swam at the:

- 2012 Olympics
- 2007 World Championships
- 2007 Pan American Games
- 2008 Open Water Worlds
- 2009 World Championships
- 2010 Central American and Caribbean Games

At the 2009 World Championships, she was part of the team that swam to a new Venezuelan Record in the 4x200 Free Relay.
