= Swimming at the 2002 Central American and Caribbean Games =

- Dates: November 2002

Swimming at the 19th Central American and Caribbean Games occurred in November 2002 in San Salvador, El Salvador. The competition consisted of 32 events: 16 for males, 16 for females; with 13 individual and 3 relays each. All were swum in a long course (50m) pool.

== Results ==
=== Men ===
| Games | Gold | | Silver | | Bronze | |
|---|---|---|---|---|---|---|
| 50 freestyle | Ricardo Busquets; Puerto Rico | 22.55 =GR | Camilo Becerra; Colombia | 23.05 | Francisco Sánchez; Venezuela | 23.33 |
| 100 freestyle | Ricardo Busquets; Puerto Rico | 50.25 | Francisco Páez; Venezuela | 51.93 | Josh Ilika; Mexico | 52.08 |
| 200 freestyle | Josh Ilika; Mexico | 1:52.15 | Ricardo Monasterio; Venezuela | 1:54.20 | Edwin Maldonado; Venezuela | 1:54.47 |
| 400 freestyle | Ricardo Monasterio; Venezuela | 3:57.63; GR | Edwin Maldonado; Venezuela | 4:01.04 | Leonardo Salinas; Mexico | 4:03.11 |
| 1500 freestyle | Ricardo Monasterio; Venezuela | 15:39.90; GR | Edwin Maldonado; Venezuela | 15:54.32 | Iván López; Mexico | 15:56.26 |
| 100 backstroke | Juan Rodela; Mexico | 58.00 | Diego Urreta; Mexico | 58.28 | Nicholas Neckles; Barbados | 58.39 |
| 200 backstroke | Diego Urreta; Mexico | 2:05.06 | Juan Rodela; Mexico | 2:05.35 | Nicholas Neckles; Barbados | 2:07.67 |
| 100 breaststroke | Francisco Suriano; El Salvador | 1:04.51 | Hiram Carrión; Puerto Rico | 1:05.39 | Alvaro Fortuny; Guatemala | 1:05.57 |
| 200 breaststroke | Francisco Suriano; El Salvador | 2:20.60 | Alvaro Fortuny; Guatemala | 2:22.87 | Leopoldo Andara; Venezuela | 2:26.19 |
| 100 butterfly | Josh Ilika; Mexico | 53.86 =GR | Francisco Sánchez; Venezuela | 54.86 | Camilo Becerra; Colombia | 54.97 |
| 200 butterfly | Juan Veloz; Mexico | 1:58.45; GR | Andrew Livingston; Puerto Rico | 2:01.37 | Pablo Marmolejo; Mexico | 2:03.85 |
| 200 I.M. | Diego Urreta; Mexico | 2:05.99; GR | César Uribe; Mexico | 2:08.53 | Kevin Gleason; Virgin Islands | 2:09.76 |
| 400 I.M. | Juan Veloz; Mexico | 4:31.83 | Leopoldo Andara; Venezuela | 4:38.35 | Hiram Carrión; Puerto Rico | 4:39.53 |
| 4x100 free relay | Venezuela; Oswaldo Quevedo, Francisco Páez, Albert Subirats, Francisco Sánchez | 3:25.76 | Mexico; Javier Diaz, Alejandro Siqueiros, Emilio Montero, Josh Ilika | 3:27.26 | Puerto Rico; Ricardo Busquets, Orlando Torres, Andrew Livingston, Hiram Carrión | 3:32.05 |
| 4x200 free relay | Mexico; Alejandro Siqueiros, Josh Ilika, Leonardo Salinas, Juan Veloz | 7:37.36; GR | Venezuela; Ricardo Monasterio, Eduardo Ramírez, Manuel Colmenares, Edwin Maldonado | 7:43.79 | Puerto Rico; Hiram Carrión, Orlando Torres, Andrew Livingston, Ricardo Busquets | 7:58.88 |
| 4x100 medley relay | Mexico; Juan Rodela, Marco González, Josh Ilika, Alejandro Siqueiros | 3:47.52 | Venezuela; Gabriel Tirabasi, Gerardo Jiménez, Francisco Sánchez, Francisco Páez | 3:49.48 | Puerto Rico; Ricardo Busquets, Hiram Carrión, Andrew Livingston, Orlando Torres | 3:51.23 |

=== Female ===
| Games | Gold | | Silver | | Bronze | |
|---|---|---|---|---|---|---|
| 50 freestyle | Eileen Coparropa; Panama | 25.68; GR | Arlene Semeco; Venezuela | 26.42 | Linda McEachrane; Trinidad and Tobago | 26.99 |
| 100 freestyle | Eileen Coparropa; Panama | 56.58; GR | Arlene Semeco; Venezuela | 57.87 | Angela Chuck; Jamaica | 58.91 |
| 200 freestyle | Angela Chuck; Jamaica | 2:07.81 | Atenas López; Mexico | 2:08.09 | Golda Marcus; El Salvador | 2:08.22 |
| 400 freestyle | Sonia Álvarez; Puerto Rico | 4:28.76 | Tania Galindo; Mexico | 4:29.58 | Golda Marcus; El Salvador | 4:31.02 |
| 800 freestyle | Tania Galindo; Mexico | 9:05.11 | Claudia Garias; Mexico | 9:06.09 | Golda Marcus; El Salvador | 9:15.72 |
| 100 backstroke | Gisela Morales; Guatemala | 1:06.17 | Tatiana Maristany; Mexico | 1:06.80 | Carolina Rivera; Venezuela | 1:07.20 |
| 200 backstroke | Gisela Morales; Guatemala | 2:20.57 | Tatiana Maristany; Mexico | 2:25.20 | Yara Saldaña; Mexico | 2:26.48 |
| 100 breaststroke | Adriana Marmolejo; Mexico | 1:13.94 | Alejandra González; Puerto Rico | 1:15.45 | Carla Mojica; Puerto Rico | 1:17.26 |
| 200 breaststroke | Adriana Marmolejo; Mexico | 2:37.84 | Carla Mojica; Puerto Rico | 2:43.18 | Norma Bernal; Mexico | 2:47.76 |
| 100 butterfly | Paola España; Mexico | 1:03.33 | María Rodríguez; Venezuela | 1:03.78 | Teresa Víctor; Mexico | 1:03.91 |
| 200 butterfly | Heather Roffey; Cayman Islands | 2:19.23 | Paola España; Mexico | 2:20.02 | María Rodríguez; Venezuela | 2:21.31 |
| 200 I.M. | Adriana Marmolejo; Mexico | 2:23.73 | Sonia Álvarez; Puerto Rico | 2:25.23 | Vanessa Martínez; Puerto Rico | 2:25.56 |
| 400 I.M. | Sonia Álvarez; Puerto Rico | 5:06.96 | Nancy García; Mexico | 5:09.90 | Vanessa Martínez; Puerto Rico | 5:12.54 |
| 4x100 free relay | Venezuela; Ximena Vilar; Diana López; Daniela Aponte; Arlene Semeco | 3:57.55; GR | Mexico; Tatiana Maristany; Atenas López; Jascquelina Paredes; Lorena Pontones | 3:58.12 | Puerto Rico; Solimar Mojica; Solmani Mojica; Gretchen Gotay; Sonia Álvarez | 4:00.27 |
| 4x200 free relay | Puerto Rico; Solimar Mojica; Vanessa Martínez; Gretchen Gotay; Sonia Álvarez | 8:39.75; GR | Mexico; Carolina Moreno; Tania Galindo; Mayra Miranda; Atenas López | 8:42.50 | Venezuela; Arlene Semeco; Oriana Galindo; Daniela Aponte; Diana López | 8:46.27 |
| 4x100 medley relay | Mexico; Tatiana Maristany; Adriana Marmolejo; Paola España; Atenas López | 4:23.42; GR | Venezuela; María Carolina Rivera; Corina Goncalves; María Rodriguez; Arlene Semeco | 4:24.67 | Puerto Rico; Emily Plummer; Alejandra González; Vanessa Martínez; Solimar Mojica | 4:30.68 |
