= Adriana Marmolejo =

Mexican swimmer (born 1982)

Personal information
- Full name: Adriana Rebeca Marmolejo Vargas
- National team: Mexico
- Born: March 5, 1982 (age 44) Mexico City, Mexico

Sport
- Sport: Swimming
- Strokes: Breaststroke
- College team: Texas A&M University (USA) (2000–2002)
Medal record
Women's swimming
Representing Mexico
Pan American Games
Bronze medal – third place	2003 Santo Domingo	4x100 m medley
Central American & Caribbean Games
Gold medal – first place	2006 Cartagena	200 m breaststroke
Silver medal – second place	2006 Cartagena	50 m breaststroke
Silver medal – second place	2006 Cartagena	100 m breaststroke
Silver medal – second place	2006 Cartagena	4x100 m medley

Adriana Rebeca Marmolejo Vargas (born March 5, 1982) is a 3-time Olympic and national record-holding swimmer from Mexico. She swam at the 2000, 2004 and 2008 Olympics, making her the first Mexican woman to swim at 3 Olympic Games. She has held the Mexican Records in the 50, 100 and 200 breaststrokes since 1998.

In January 2009, Marmolejo became an assistant coach with the men's and women's swimming teams at Arizona State University. After coaching in Phoenix, and later at Northwestern University, Marmolejo joined the coaching staff at the University of Chicago In October 2010.

== Family ==
Adriana father's, Ricardo, and her brother Pablo have both been members of Mexico's national swimming team. Ricardo swam at the 1968 and 1972 Summer Olympics. Pablo swam at the 2006 Central American and Caribbean Games (alongside Adriana) and at the 2007 World Championships. At the 2009 FINA World Championships in Rome, Italy Pablo set the Mexico National Record in the 100 meter butterfly. A record once held father, Ricardo. In June 2011, Adriana married Kyle Schack of Huntington Woods, Michigan in Cancún, Quintana Roo, Mexico. She changed her name to Adriana Schack.

== Swimming ==
Adriana has won 75 Mexican National titles over the course of her swimming career.

She swam collegiately for the USA's Texas A&M University.

On August 10, 1998, at the 1998 Central American and Caribbean Games in Maracaibo, Venezuela, she set the Games Record in the women's 200m Breaststroke (2:37.12). She also bettered the mark at the 2006 CACs.

At the 2008 Olympics, Marmolejo swam a lifetime best time and bettered her Mexican Record in the 100 and 200m breaststroke (1:10.73 and 2:28.10).
