= Vanessa García =

Puerto Rican swimmer (born 1984)

Personal information
- Full name: Vanessa M. García Vega
- Nationality: Puerto Rico
- Born: July 18, 1984 (age 41) Vega Baja, Puerto Rico

Sport
- Sport: Swimming
- Strokes: Freestyle
Medal record
Pan Am Games
Silver medal – second place	2007 Rio de Janeiro	50m Free
Bronze medal – third place	2007 Rio de Janeiro	100m Free
Central American & Caribbean Games
Gold medal – first place	2006 Cartagena	50 Free
Gold medal – first place	2006 Cartagena	100 Free
Gold medal – first place	2010 Mayagüez	100 Free
Gold medal – first place	2010 Mayaguez	50 Free

Vanessa García Vega (born July 18, 1984, in Vega Baja, Puerto Rico) is an Olympic and National Record holding freestyle swimmer from Puerto Rico. She swam for her native country at the 2004, 2008, 2012, and 2016 Olympics.

García's silver medal in the 50 freestyle, and bronze in the 100 at the 2007 Pan American Games were Puerto Rico's only swimming medals at the Games.

She additionally has four gold medals from the Central American and Caribbean Games, having one gold in the 50 and 100 free in both 2006 and 2010. She holds the Central American and Caribbean Games record in the 50 freestyle, set at the 2010 games in Mayahuez, Puerto Rico.

At the 2006 Central American and Caribbean Games, García set the Games Records in winning the 50 and 100 frees.
