= Heather Roffey =

Caymanian swimmer (born 1986)

Personal information
- Full name: Heather Claire Roffey
- National team: Cayman Islands
- Born: 2 September 1986 (age 39) Grand Cayman, Cayman; Islands
- Height: 1.60 m (5 ft 3 in)
- Weight: 59 kg (130 lb)

Sport
- Sport: Swimming
- Strokes: Freestyle, butterfly
- Club: Bolles School Swim Club (U.S.)
- College team: University of South Carolina (U.S.)
- Coach: Donald Gibb (U.S.)
Medal record
Women's swimming
Representing Cayman Islands
Central American and Caribbean Games
Gold medal – first place	2002 San Salvador	200 m butterfly

Heather Claire Roffey (born September 30, 1986) is a Caymanian former swimmer, who specialized in long-distance freestyle and butterfly events. She became one of the first swimmers, and the first female, in history to represent the Cayman Islands in swimming at the Summer Olympics at the 2004 Summer Olympics in Athens, along with Shaune Fraser and Andrew Mackay.

At her first Olympics, Roffey qualified for two swimming events with three days in between. She posted FINA B-standard entry times of 9:01.41 (800 m freestyle) and 2:17.70 (200 m butterfly) from the Ultra Swim Meet in Charlotte, North Carolina. In the 200 m butterfly, Roffey challenged seven other swimmers on the first heat, including 15-year-old Maria Bulakhova of Russia. She cleared a 2:20 barrier to clinch a fifth spot and thirtieth overall in 2:19.34, just nearly two seconds off her entry time. In her second event, 800 m freestyle, Kwon placed twenty-fifth overall on the morning's preliminaries. Swimming again in heat one, she raced to fourth place by a 3.07-second margin behind winner Golda Marcus of El Salvador with a time of 9:02.88.

Roffey is also a member of Bolles School Swim Club in Jacksonville, Florida, and a varsity swimmer for the South Carolina Gamecocks, under her respective coaches Jeff Poppell and Donald Gibb. In 2007, she graduated from the University of South Carolina in Columbia, with a bachelor's degree in accounting.
