= Erwin Maldonado =

Venezuelan swimmer (born 1983)

Personal information
- Born: July 25, 1983 (age 42) San Cristóbal, Venezuela

Sport
- Sport: Swimming
Medal record
Representing Venezuela
South American Games
Gold medal – first place	2006 Buenos Aires	400m freestyle
Gold medal – first place	2006 Buenos Aires	4x200m freestyle relay
Silver medal – second place	2006 Buenos Aires	800m freestyle
Silver medal – second place	2006 Buenos Aires	10km open water
Bronze medal – third place	2006 Buenos Aires	1500m freestyle

Erwin Maldonado (born 25 July 1983) is an Olympic distance freestyle swimmer from Venezuela. He has swum for Venezuela at the:

- Olympics: 2008, 2012, 2016
- World Championships: 2003, 2007, 2011
- Pan American Games: 2007, 2011
- Central American & Caribbean Games: 2006
- South American Games: 2006, 2010
- Open Water Worlds: 2008
