= Patricia Castañeda Miyamoto =

Mexican swimmer (born 1990)

Patricia Castañeda
Personal information
- Full name: Patricia Midori Castañeda Miyamoto
- Nationality: Mexico
- Born: March 16, 1990 (age 36) Mexico City, Mexico
- Height: 167 cm (5 ft 6 in)

Sport
- Sport: Swimming
- Strokes: Freestyle
Medal record
Pan American Games
Silver medal – second place	2007 Rio	400 m freestyle
Silver medal – second place	2007 Rio	800 m freestyle
Bronze medal – third place	2011 Guadalajara	4x200 m freestyle
Central American and Caribbean Games
Gold medal – first place	2006 Cartagena	1500 m freestyle
Gold medal – first place	2006 Cartagena	4x200 m freestyle
Bronze medal – third place	2006 Cartagena	400 m freestyle

Patricia Midori Castañeda Miyamoto (born March 16, 1990, in Mexico City) is a Mexican swimmer of Japanese descent. She is also known as Patricia Castañeda.

At the 2007 Pan American Games, she garnered 2 silver medals by finishing second in the 400m and 800m freestyle.

She competed at the 2012 Summer Olympics in the women's 800 m freestyle, finishing in 27th place.

== See also ==
- List of Mexican records in swimming
