= Gisela Morales =

Guatemalan swimmer (born 1987)

Personal information
- Full name: Gisela Maria Morales Valentin
- National team: Guatemala
- Born: 17 December 1987 (age 38) Guatemala City, Guatemala
- Height: 6 ft 0 in (1.83 m)

Sport
- Sport: Swimming
- Strokes: Backstroke
- College team: Auburn University (U.S.) (2005-2007); University of Texas (U.S.) (2007-2008)
Medal record
Women's swimming
Representing Guatemala
Pan American Games
Bronze medal – third place	2003 S.Domingo	100 m backstroke
Bronze medal – third place	2003 S.Domingo	200 m backstroke
Central American and Caribbean Games
Gold medal – first place	2002 San Salvador	100 m backstroke
Gold medal – first place	2002 San Salvador	200 m backstroke
Gold medal – first place	2010 Mayagüez	50 m backstroke
Gold medal – first place	2010 Mayagüez	100 m backstroke
Gold medal – first place	2010 Mayagüez	200 m backstroke
Silver medal – second place	2006 Cartagena	100 m backstroke
Silver medal – second place	2006 Cartagena	200 m backstroke
Silver medal – second place	2014 Veracruz	50 m backstroke
Bronze medal – third place	2006 Cartagena	50 m backstroke
Bronze medal – third place	2014 Veracruz	100 m backstroke
Bronze medal – third place	2014 Veracruz	200 m backstroke

Gisela Maria Morales Valentin (born 17 December 1987) is an Olympic swimmer from Guatemala. She competed at the 2004 and 2008 Olympics.

She also won two bronze medals at the 2003 Pan American Games. She attended college (and swam for) the USA's Auburn University before transferring to the University of Texas.

Morales served as Guatemala's flag-bearer at the 2004 Olympic Games, where she finished 27th and 26th in the 100m backstroke and the 200m backstroke respectively.

At the 2010 Central American and Caribbean Games, Morales won the Gold Medal in both the 50m backstroke and the 100m backstroke, and the Silver Medal in the 200m backstroke, in a close battle with Mexican competitor Fernanda González.

She represented Guatemala at the 2011 and 2015 Pan American Games.

== International competitions ==
- 2003 Pan American Games (100 & 200 backs)
- 2004 Olympics
- 2005 World Championships
- 2008 Olympics (100 & 200 backs)
- 2010 Central American and Caribbean Games (50, 100 & 200 backs)
- 2011 Pan American Games (100 & 200 backs)
