= Pamela Benítez =

Salvadoran swimmer (born 1991)

Personal information
- Full name: Alexia Pamela Benítez Quijada
- Nationality: El Salvador
- Born: May 9, 1991 (age 35)
- Height: 1.65 m (5 ft 5 in)
- Weight: 57 kg (126 lb)

Sport
- Sport: Swimming
- Strokes: Freestyle
- Club: Aquatica El Polvorín
Medal record
Women's swimming
Representing El Salvador
Central American and Caribbean Games
Bronze medal – third place	2006 Cartagena	200m Freestyle
Bronze medal – third place	2006 Cartagena	4x200m Freestyle Relay
Bronze medal – third place	2010 Mayagüez	200m Freestyle
Bronze medal – third place	2010 Mayagüez	400m Freestyle
Bronze medal – third place	2010 Mayagüez	800m Freestyle

Pamela Benítez (born May 9, 1991) is a female swimmer from El Salvador. She was the country's flagbearer in the Open Ceremonies of the 2010 Central American and Caribbean Games.

She has swum for El Salvador at the:

- World Championships: 2007 and 2009
- Pan American Games: 2007
- Central American & Caribbean Games: 2006 and 2010

At the 2010 Central American and Caribbean Games, she won three bronze medals (in the 200, 400 and 800 freestyles).

At the 2010 Central American Games, she was El Salvadores' most decorated athlete, winning 8 gold medals.

She joined the Southern Illinois Salukis swimming team for the Spring 2012 season and inspired all. She won 12 of her first 13 races and was a Missouri Valley Conference first-team All-Conference selection.

Benitez represented El Salvador in the 2012 London Olympic Games, swimming the 800-meter freestyle.
