= Gretchen Gotay =

Puerto Rican swimmer (born 1980)

Personal information
- Full name: Gretchen Gotay Cordero
- National team: Puerto Rico
- Born: 14 August 1980 (age 45) San Juan, Puerto Rico
- Height: 1.73 m (5 ft 8 in)
- Weight: 62 kg (137 lb)

Sport
- Sport: Swimming
- Strokes: Freestyle, backstroke
- Club: Athens Bulldogs Swim Club (U.S.)
- Coach: Harvey Humphries
Medal record
Women's swimming
Representing Puerto Rico
Central American and Caribbean Games
Gold medal – first place	1998 Maracaibo	4×200 m freestyle
Gold medal – first place	2002 San Salvador	4×200 m freestyle
Bronze medal – third place	2002 San Salvador	4×100 m freestyle
Bronze medal – third place	2006 Cartagena	4×100 m medley

Gretchen Gotay Cordero (born August 14, 1980) is a Puerto Rican former swimmer, who specialized in freestyle and backstroke events. She won a total of four medals (2 golds and 2 bronze) in both freestyle and medley relays at the Central American and Caribbean Games (1998, 2002, and 2006). She is a member of Athens Bulldogs Swim Club under her personal coach Harvey Humphries, and a graduate with a master's degree in sports management at the University of Georgia in Athens.

Gotay qualified for the women's 200 m backstroke, as a member of the Puerto Rico team, at the 2004 Summer Olympics in Athens. She posted a meet-record and a FINA B-standard of 2:19.89 from the Caribbean Championships in Kingston, Jamaica. She participated in the first heat, against two other swimmers Saida Iskandarova of Uzbekistan, and Sherry Tsai of Hong Kong, who carried the nation's flag in the opening ceremony. She raced to second place by a 4.56-second margin behind winner Tsai, outside her entry time of 2:23.39. Gotay failed to advance into the semifinals, as she placed thirty-first overall in the preliminaries.
