= Erika Stewart =

American swimmer of Colombian origin (born 1990)

Personal information
- Full name: Erika Layne Stewart
- National team: Colombia
- Born: 2 August 1990 (age 35) Durham, North Carolina, United States
- Height: 1.70 m (5 ft 7 in)
- Weight: 60 kg (132 lb)

Sport
- Sport: Swimming
- Strokes: Individual medley
- Club: Marlins of Raleigh (U.S.)
- College team: University of Virginia (U.S.)
- Coach: Mark Bernardino (U.S.)

Erika Layne Stewart (born August 2, 1990) is an American swimmer of Colombian origin, who specialized in the individual medley events. Born and raised in the United States, she acquired a dual citizenship to compete internationally and represent her father's homeland Colombia in swimming at the 2008 Summer Olympics. While serving as a member of Marlins of Raleigh club in her home state North Carolina, Stewart also trained under head coach Mark Bernardino for the University of Virginia's Cavaliers swimming team.

Stewart competed for Colombia in the women's 200 m individual medley at the 2008 Summer Olympics in Beijing. Although she finished outside the top eight final at the U.S. Olympic Trials in Omaha, Nebraska, she scored a lifetime best of 2:19.75 to slide under the FINA B-cut (2:20.00) by exactly a quarter of a second (0.25) and assure her exceptional selection to the Colombian team. Coming from third at the halfway mark in heat one, Stewart stormed home on the rear of the dominant breaststroke leg to crush a new Colombian record for the runner-up spot in 2:18.54, just 0.29 seconds behind the leader Hanna Dzerkal of Ukraine. Stewart's remarkable Olympic feat in the pool would not be enough for her to celebrate, as she just finished only in thirty-second overall and did not advance to the semifinals.
