= Susana Escobar =

Mexican swimmer and Olympian

Personal information
- Full name: Charetzeri Susana Escobar Torres
- Nationality: Mexico
- Born: 13 December 1987 (age 38) Guanajuato, Mexico
- Height: 1.72 m (5 ft 8 in)
- Weight: 62 kg (137 lb)

Sport
- Sport: Swimming
- Strokes: Freestyle
- Club: AMV La Loma Swim Club; Acuatica Nelson Vargas
- College team: Texas Longhorns (2006-)
- Coach: Jack Roach
Medal record
Pan American Games
Bronze medal – third place	2011 Guadalajara	4x200 m freestyle
Central American and Caribbean Games
Gold medal – first place	2006 Cartagena	800 m freestyle
Gold medal – first place	2006 Cartagena	400 m medley
Gold medal – first place	2006 Cartagena	4x200 m freestyle
Silver medal – second place	2006 Cartagena	400 m freestyle
Silver medal – second place	2006 Cartagena	1500 m freestyle
Silver medal – second place	2006 Cartagena	200 m medley
Gold medal – first place	2010 Mayagüez	1500 m freestyle
Gold medal – first place	2010 Mayagüez	400 m medley

Susana Escobar (born 13 December 1987 in Guanajuato, Guanajuato) is a Mexican swimmer and Olympian. As of October 2008, she attends and swims for the USA's University of Texas at Austin.

At the 2008 Olympics, she set three Mexican Records in the three events she swam: the 400 free (4:11.99 – 20th), 800 free (8:33.51 – 18th), and 400 IM (4:47.32 – 30th).

She also swam at the 2007 Pan American Games. She also competed at the 2009 World Championships in Rome. She also competed at the 2012 Summer Olympics, in the 400 m freestyle and the 400 m individual medley.

== See also ==
- List of Mexican records in swimming
