= Golda Marcus =

Salvadoran swimmer (born 1983)

Personal information
- Full name: Golda Lee Marcus
- Nationality: El Salvador
- Born: March 15, 1983 (age 43) Nahuizalco, El Salvador

Sport
- Sport: Swimming
- Strokes: Distance Freestyle
- College team: Florida State Seminoles (2001-2004)
Medal record
Central American and Caribbean Games
Bronze medal – third place	2002 San Salvador	200m Freestyle
Bronze medal – third place	2002 San Salvador	400m Freestyle
Bronze medal – third place	2002 San Salvador	800m Freestyle
Bronze medal – third place	2006 Cartagena	1500m Freestyle
Bronze medal – third place	2006 Cartagena	4x200m Free Relay
Central American Games
Gold medal – first place	2002 San Salvador	(in 7 events)
Silver medal – second place	2002 San Salvador	(in 2 events)
CCCANs
Gold medal – first place	2001 Santo Domingo	(in 2 events)
Bronze medal – third place	2001 Santo Domingo	(in 3 events)
Gold medal – first place	2007 San Salvador	200m Freestyle
Gold medal – first place	2007 San Salvador	400m Freestyle
Gold medal – first place	2007 San Salvador	800m Freestyle
Silver medal – second place	2007 San Salvador	200m Butterfly

Golda Lee Marcus (born March 15, 1983, in Nahuizalco, El Salvador) is a two-time Olympic swimmer from El Salvador. She swam at the 2004 and 2008 Olympics. As of June 2009, she holds the Salvadoran records in the 400, 800, and 1500 meter freestyles.

In 2001, she won 7 gold and 2 silver medals at the 2001 Central American Games, and 2 golds and 3 bronzes at the CCCAN Championships. At the 2002 Central American and Caribbean Games, she garnered bronze medals in the 200m, 400m and 800m freestyles.

At the 2006 Central American and Caribbean Games, she won bronze medals in the women's 1500m freestyle and the 4x200 freestyle relay.

At the 2007 CCCANs, she won the 200, 400, and 800 meter freestyles, and finished second in the 200 meter butterfly.

She also swam for El Salvador at the 2003 and 2007 World Championships, and at the 2007 Pan American Games.

She has previously coached De Anza Cupertino Aquatics, and as of 2020, she is currently coaching Burlingame Aquatics Club (BAC) in California. She teaches at Saratoga High School with competitive swimmers.
