= Erin Volcán =

Venezuelan swimmer (born 1984)

Erin Volcan
Personal information
- Full name: Erin Nicole Volcán Smith
- National team: Venezuela
- Born: January 12, 1984 (age 42) Long Beach, California, U.S.
- Height: 5 ft 8 in (173 cm)
- Weight: 143 lb (65 kg)
- Spouse: Brian Magida

Sport
- Sport: Swimming
- Strokes: Backstroke, medley
- Club: Irvine Novaquatics
- College team: Auburn University
Medal record
Women's swimming
Representing Venezuela
Universiade
Bronze medal – third place	2003 Daegu	200 m backstroke
Central American & Caribbean Games
Gold medal – first place	2006 Cartagena	200 m backstroke
Gold medal – first place	2006 Cartagena	4×100 m freestyle
Gold medal – first place	2006 Cartagena	4×100 m medley
Silver medal – second place	2006 Cartagena	200 m freestyle
Silver medal – second place	2006 Cartagena	4×200 m freestyle
Bronze medal – third place	2006 Cartagena	200 m indiv. medley
South America Championships
Gold medal – first place	2008 São Paulo	200 m backstroke

Erin Nicole Volcán Smith (born January 12, 1984) is an international backstroke and individual medley swimmer from Venezuela. She is a former South American record holder, and current (2009) Venezuelan record holder. She swam for Venezuela at the 2008 Olympics.

She attended Auburn University in Auburn, Alabama, United States, where she competed for the Auburn Tigers swimming and diving team. She was also on the U.S. team for the 2003 Summer Univerisade team, where she won a bronze medal in the 200-meter backstroke.

At the 2006 Central American and Caribbean Games she set a new games record in the 200 back (2:16.65), bettering a 20-year-old record set by Silvia Poll at the 1986 Games.

She has swum at:

- 2003 Summer Universiade
- 2006 Central American & Caribbean Games
- 2007 World Championships
- 2007 Pan American Games
- 2008 Olympics
