= Alana Dillette =

Bahamian swimmer and academic (born 1987)

Personal information
- Full name: Alana Kathryn Dillette
- National team: Bahamas
- Born: December 2, 1987 (age 38) Peterborough, Ontario, Canada
- Height: 5 ft 9 in (175 cm)
- Weight: 64 kg (141 lb)

Sport
- Sport: Swimming
- Strokes: Back, IM
- Club: Swift (BAH); Auburn (USA)
- College team: Auburn University
Medal record
Women's swimming
Representing the Bahamas
Pan American Games
Bronze medal – third place	2007 Rio de Janeiro	4x100 m medley

Alana Kathryn Dillette (born December 2, 1987) is an academic and Olympic swimmer from The Bahamas.

Dillette swam for the Bahamas at the 2008 Summer Olympics, as well as at the 2007 Pan American Games. She attended and swam for the USA's Auburn University.

At the 2007 Pan American Games she was part of the bronze medal winning women's 4 × 100 m medley relay alongside Alicia Lightbourne, Arianna Vanderpool-Wallace and Nikia Deveaux.

Dillette majored in travel and tourism and as of 2022 is Assistant Professor in the L. Robert Payne School of Hospitality and Tourism Management at San Diego State University. Her research interests include the Black Travel Movement.

== See also ==
- Swimming at the 2007 Pan American Games
- List of Bahamian records in swimming
