= Swimming at the 2006 Central American and Caribbean Games =

- Venue: S.U. Pedro de Heredia Aquatic Complex
- Location: (Colombia) Cartagena
- Dates: 17–22 July

The swimming events at the 2006 Central American and Caribbean Games occurred July 17–22, 2006 at S.U. Pedro de Heredia Aquatic Complex in Cartagena, Colombia.

== Participating countries ==
189 swimmers from 25 countries took part in the swimming events at the 2006 Central American and Caribbean Games (team size follows name):

- Aruba (5)
- Bahamas (11)
- Barbados (9)
- Cayman Islands (5)
- Colombia (20)
- Costa Rica (5)
- Cuba (9)
- Dominican Republic (3)
- El Salvador (6)
- Grenada (2)
- Guatemala (6)
- Guyana (1)
- Honduras (6)
- Jamaica (5)
- Mexico (28)
- Netherlands Antilles (2)
- Nicaragua (2)
- Panama (2)
- Puerto Rico (10)
- Saint Lucia (3)
- Saint Vincent and the Grenadines (1)
- Suriname (8)
- Trinidad and Tobago (8)
- Venezuela (24)
- Virgin Islands (8)

== Results ==
=== Men ===
Event	Gold		Silver		Bronze	
50m freestyle	George Bovell; Trinidad and Tobago	22.67	Albert Subirats; Venezuela	22.92	Ricardo Busquets; Puerto Rico	23.01
100m freestyle	Albert Subirats; Venezuela	49.55; GR	Shaune Fraser; Cayman Islands	50.02	George Bovell; Trinidad and Tobago	50.19
200m freestyle	Shaune Fraser; Cayman Islands	1:49.84; GR	Iván López; Mexico	1:51.16	George Bovell; Trinidad and Tobago	1:52.03
400m freestyle	Iván López; Mexico	3:57.21; GR	Ricardo Monasterio; Venezuela	3:57.71	Erwin Maldonado; Venezuela	3:57.85
800m freestyle	Iván López; Mexico	8:07.30; GR, NR	Ricardo Monasterio; Venezuela	8:11.58	Erwin Maldonado; Venezuela	8:21.66
1500m freestyle	Ricardo Monasterio; Venezuela	15:38.99; GR	Iván López; Mexico	15:39.80	Erwin Maldonado; Venezuela	15:56.55
50m backstroke	Nicholas Neckles; Barbados	26.44; GR	Omar Pinzón; Colombia	26.74	Nicholas Bovell; Trinidad and Tobago	26.82
100m backstroke	Nicholas Neckles; Barbados	56.57; NR	Omar Pinzón; Colombia	57.70	Nicholas Bovell; Trinidad and Tobago	58.00
200m backstroke	Nicholas Neckles; Barbados	2:00.85; GR, NR	Omar Pinzón; Colombia	2:03.60	David Rodriguez; Cuba	2:05.37
50m breaststroke	Alfredo Jacobo; Mexico	28.85; GR	Arsenio López; Puerto Rico	29.00	Édgar Crespo; Panama	29.11
100m breaststroke	Alfredo Jacobo; Mexico	1:03.62	Bradley Ally; Barbados	1:04.50	Andrei Cross; Barbados	1:05.33
200m breaststroke	Bradley Ally; Barbados	2:19.28	Alfredo Jacobo; Mexico	2:19.82	Alejandro Jacobo; Mexico	2:21.33
50m butterfly	Albert Subirats; Venezuela	24.09; GR	Octavio Alesi; Venezuela	24.38	Ricardo Busquets; Puerto Rico; Manuel Sotomayor; Mexico	24.69
100m butterfly	Albert Subirats; Venezuela	52.39; GR	Pablo Marmolejo; Mexico	54.63	Jeremy Knowles; Bahamas	54.70
200m butterfly	Juan Veloz; Mexico	1:58.75	Jeremy Knowles; Bahamas	2:00.37	Julio Galofre; Colombia	2:02.13
200m IM	Bradley Ally; Barbados	2:02.98; GR	Jeremy Knowles; Bahamas; Shaune Fraser; Cayman Islands	2:04.51	not awarded	
400m IM	Bradley Ally; Barbados	4:22.86; GR	Jeremy Knowles; Bahamas	4:23.83	Raúl López Juárez; Mexico	4:34.27
4 × 100 m Free Relay	Venezuela; Albert Subirats, Crox Acuña, Octavio Alesi, Luis Rojas	3:22.58; GR	Mexico; Manuel Sotomayor, Juan Yeh, Alejandro Siqueiros, Iván López	3:25.85; NR	Puerto Rico; Raúl Martínez Colomer, Arsenio López, Douglas Lennox-Silva, Ricardo Busquets	3:27.76
4 × 200 m Free Relay	Mexico; Juan Yeah, Alejandro Siqueiros, Juan Veloz, Iván López	7:32.40; GR	Venezuela; Ricardo Monasterio, Crox Acuña, Erwin Maldonado, Albert Subirats	7:35.74	Colombia; Carlos Vivero, Julio Galofre, Omar Pinzón, Sebastián Arango	7:46.06
4 × 100 m Medley Relay	Venezuela; Albert Subirats, Rohan Pinto, Octavio Alesi Gonzalez, Luis Rojas	3:45.98; NR	Mexico; Jose Bayata, Alfredo Jacobo, Pablo Marmolejo, Juan Yeh	3:46.12	Puerto Rico; Raúl Martínez Colomer, Arsenio López, Douglas Lennox-Silva, Ricardo Busquets	3:48.95

=== Women ===
Event	Gold		Silver		Bronze	
50m freestyle	Vanessa García; Puerto Rico	25.29; GR, NR	Arlene Semeco; Venezuela	25.46	Sharntelle McLean; Trinidad and Tobago	26.37
100m freestyle	Vanessa García; Puerto Rico	55.80; GR	Claudia Poll; Costa Rica	56.31	Arlene Semeco; Venezuela	57.06
200m freestyle	Claudia Poll; Costa Rica	2:00.19; GR	Erin Volcán; Venezuela	2:03.92	Pamela Benítez; El Salvador	2:04.11
400m freestyle	Claudia Poll; Costa Rica	4:15.01; GR	Susana Escobar; Mexico	4:18.11	Patricia Castañeda; Mexico	4:20.63
800m freestyle	Susana Escobar; Mexico	8:51.05; GR	Patricia Castañeda; Mexico	8:54.15	Andreina Pinto; Venezuela	9:00.36
1500m freestyle	Patricia Castañeda; Mexico	17:03.47; GR	Susana Escobar; Mexico	17:14.83	Golda Marcus; El Salvador	17:31.70
50m backstroke	Fernanda González; Mexico	30.61; GR	Jeserick Pinto Sequera; Venezuela	30.77	Gisela Morales; Guatemala	30.96
100m backstroke	Fernanda González; Mexico	1:04.28; GR	Gisela Morales; Guatemala	1:04.62	Carolina Colorado Henao; Colombia	1:05.54
200m backstroke	Erin Volcán; Venezuela	2:16.65; GR	Gisela Morales; Guatemala	2:16.92	Lourdes Villaseñor Reyes; Mexico	2:17.93
50m breaststroke	Alia Atkinson; Jamaica	32.64; GR	Adriana Marmolejo; Mexico	33.92	Daniela Victoria Sacco; Venezuela	34.08
100m breaststroke	Alia Atkinson; Jamaica	1:12.24	Adriana Marmolejo; Mexico	1:12:41	Daniela Victoria Sacco; Venezuela	1:14.70
200m breaststroke	Adriana Marmolejo; Mexico	2:34.59; GR	Alia Atkinson; Jamaica	2:38.31	Daniela Victoria Sacco; Venezuela	2:39.81
50m butterfly	Alia Atkinson; Jamaica	28.59	Sharntelle McLean; Trinidad and Tobago	28.62	Teresa Victor Lopez; Mexico	28.81
100m butterfly	Teresa Victor Lopez; Mexico	1:02.46; GR	Alejandra Rodriguez; Venezuela	1:03.59	Alma Arciniega Castro; Mexico	1:03.63
200m butterfly	Alma Arciniega; Mexico	2:15.82; GR	Prisciliana Escobar; Mexico	2:17.86	Andreina Pinto; Venezuela	2:17.89
200m I.M.	Alia Atkinson; Jamaica	2:21.69	Susana Escobar; Mexico	2:21.87	Erin Volcán; Venezuela	2:22.11
400m IM	Susana Escobar; Mexico	4:57.49	Silvia Perez Sierra; Venezuela	5:02.82	Prisciliana Escobar; Mexico	5:05.53
4 × 100 m Free Relay	Venezuela; Ximena Vilar, Diana López, Erin Volcán, Arlene Semeco	3:52.40; GR	Mexico; Mariana Alvarado, Carlina Moreno, Liliana Ibáñez, Alma Arciniega	3:53.46; NR	Bahamas; Nikia Deveaux, Ariel Weech, Arianna Vanderpool-Wallace, Alana Dillette	3:57.22
4 × 200 m Free Relay	Mexico; Mariana Alvarado, Patricia Castañeda, Alejandra Galan, Susana Escobar	8:27.41; GR	Venezuela; Yanel Pinto, Jennifer Marquez, Andreina Pinto, Erin Volcán	8:32.75	El Salvador; Pamela Benítez, Ana Hernandez Duarte; Ileana Murillo, Golda Marcus	8:36.40
4 × 100 m Medley Relay	Venezuela; Erin Volcán, Daniela Victoria Sacco, M^{a} Alejandra Rodriguez, Arlene Semeco	4:17.51; GR	Mexico; Fernanda González, Adriana Marmolejo, Teresa Victor Lopez, Carolina Moreno	4:18.07	Puerto Rico; Gretchen Gotay, Betsmara Cruz, Vanessa Martinez, Vanessa García	4:26.17

== Medal standings ==
Country	Gold	Silver	Bronze	Total
Mexico	15	15	8	38
Venezuela	9	11	10	30
Barbados	6	1	1	8
Jamaica	4	1	–	5
Puerto Rico	2	1	5	8
Costa Rica	2	1	–	3
Cayman Islands	1	2	–	3
Trinidad and Tobago	1	1	5	7
Colombia	–	3	3	6
Bahamas	–	3	2	5
Guatemala	–	2	1	3
El Salvador	–	–	3	3
Cuba	–	–	1	1
Panama	–	–	1	1
