= Weightlifting at the 2007 Pan American Games =

- Venue: Complexo Esportivo Riocentro
- Dates: July 14–18, 2007

Weightlifting competitions at the 2007 Pan American Games in Rio de Janeiro, Brazil were held between July 14 and 18, 2007 at the Complexo Esportivo Riocentro.

== Competition schedule ==
There were at most three sessions of competition on each day of the 2007 Pan American Games Weightlifting program:

- Early afternoon session: 14:00–15:30 BRT
- Afternoon session: 16:00–17:30 BRT
- Evening session: 18:00–19:30 BRT

F	Final

Date →	Sat 14			Sun 15			Mon 16			Tue 17			Wed 18		
Event ↓	EA	AF	EV	EA	AF	EV	EA	AF	EV	EA	AF	EV	EA	AF	EV
Men's
Men's 56 kg	F														
Men's 62 kg			F												
Men's 69 kg					F										
Men's 77 kg							F								
Men's 85 kg									F						
Men's 94 kg											F				
Men's 105 kg													F		
Men's +105 kg															F
Women's
Women's 48 kg		F													
Women's 53 kg				F											
Women's 58 kg						F									
Women's 63 kg								F							
Women's 69 kg										F					
Women's 75 kg												F			
Women's +75 kg														F	

== Medal table ==
* Host nation (Brazil)

Rank	Nation	Gold	Silver	Bronze	Total
1	Colombia	5	3	1	9
2	Cuba	5	1	0	6
3	Ecuador	2	0	1	3
4	Mexico	1	2	0	3
5	Dominican Republic	1	0	2	3
6	Chile	1	0	1	2
7	Venezuela	0	3	4	7
8	United States	0	2	2	4
9	Argentina	0	1	2	3
10	El Salvador	0	1	1	2
11	Canada	0	1	0	1
11	Peru	0	1	0	1
13	Honduras	0	0	1	1
Totals (13 entries)		15	15	15	45

== Medalists ==
=== Men's events ===
Event	Gold	Silver	Bronze
56 kg	Sergio Álvarez; Cuba	Marvin López; El Salvador	Jaime Iturra; Chile
62 kg	Diego Salazar; Colombia	Miñan Mogollon; Peru	David Mendoza; Honduras
69 kg	Yordanis Borrero; Cuba	Edwin Mosquera; Colombia	Ricardo Flores; Ecuador
77 kg	Iván Cambar; Cuba	José Ocando; Venezuela	Octavio Mejías; Venezuela
85 kg	José Oliver Ruiz; Colombia	Jadier Valladares; Cuba	Herbys Márquez; Venezuela
94 kg	Yoandry Hernández; Cuba	Julio Luna; Venezuela	Wilmer Torres; Colombia
105 kg	Joel Mackenzie; Cuba	Pedro Stetsiuk; Argentina	Damián Abbiate; Argentina
+105 kg	Cristián Escalante; Chile	Casey Burgener; United States	Victor Heredia; Venezuela

=== Women's events ===
Event	Gold	Silver	Bronze
48 kg	Carolina Valencia; Mexico	Betsi Rivas; Venezuela	Guillermina Candelario; Dominican Republic
53 kg	Yuderqui Contreras; Dominican Republic	Ana Margot Lemos; Colombia	Melanie Roach; United States
58 kg	Alexandra Escobar; Ecuador	Rusmeris Villar; Colombia	María Cecilia Floriddia; Argentina
63 kg	Leydi Solís; Colombia	Christine Girard; Canada	Natalie Woolfolk; United States
69 kg	Tulia Medina; Colombia	Cinthya Domínguez; Mexico	Vanessa Nuñez; Venezuela
75 kg	Ubaldina Valoyes; Colombia	Damaris Aguirre; Mexico	Eva Dimas; El Salvador
+75 kg	Oliba Nieve; Ecuador	Emmy Vargas; United States	Yinelis Burgos; Dominican Republic

== Participating nations ==
A total of 22 countries qualified athletes. The number of weightlifters a nation has entered is in parentheses beside the name of the country. A total of 118 lifters were entered.

- Argentina (4)
- Barbados (1)
- Bolivia (1)
- Brazil (15)
- Canada (7)
- Chile (7)
- Colombia (11)
- Cuba (9)
- Dominican Republic (9)
- Ecuador (7)
- El Salvador (3)
- Guatemala (2)
- Honduras (1)
- Mexico (7)
- Nicaragua (3)
- Panama (2)
- Peru (3)
- Puerto Rico (3)
- Trinidad and Tobago (1)
- United States (9)
- Uruguay (2)
- Venezuela (11)

== See also ==
- Weightlifting at the 2006 Central American and Caribbean Games
- Weightlifting at the 2008 Summer Olympics
