= 2007 Pan American Games medal table =

- Location: Rio de Janeiro, Brazil

Highlights
- Most gold medals: United States (97)
- Most total medals: United States (237)

Map of the Americas showing the achievements of each country during the 2007 Games, held in Rio de Janeiro, Brazil.

The 2007 Pan American Games, officially known as the XV Pan American Games, were a continental multi-sport event held in Rio de Janeiro, Brazil, from July 13 to July 29, 2007. At the Games, 5,633 athletes selected from 42 National Olympic Committees (NOCs) participated in 332 events in 34 sports divided into 47 disciplines. According to the Rio de Janeiro Organizing Committee for the Pan American Games, 2,196 medals were awarded for every winning athlete, including individuals from teams, during 334 awards ceremonies.

Thirty-two nations earned medals at the Games, and nineteen won at least one gold medal. Antigua and Barbuda and El Salvador won their first ever gold medals. The Netherlands Antilles, the Bahamas, Brazil, Chile, Colombia, El Salvador, Ecuador, Guatemala, Guyana, Honduras, the Cayman Islands, Panama, the Dominican Republic and Saint Lucia improved their position in the general medal table compared to the 2003 Pan American Games, held in Santo Domingo, Dominican Republic.

For the first time since the 1955 Games, American athletes did not win more than 100 gold medals. The United States led the medal count for the 12th time, winning 97 gold medals. It also won the silver medal count, with 88, and the total medals count, with 237. Competitors from the host nation, Brazil, led the bronze medal count for the first time, with 65. Brazil won 52 gold medals, 40 silver medals and a total of 157 medals, its best ever overall performance and best placement in the medal table since the 1967 Games.

== Medal table ==
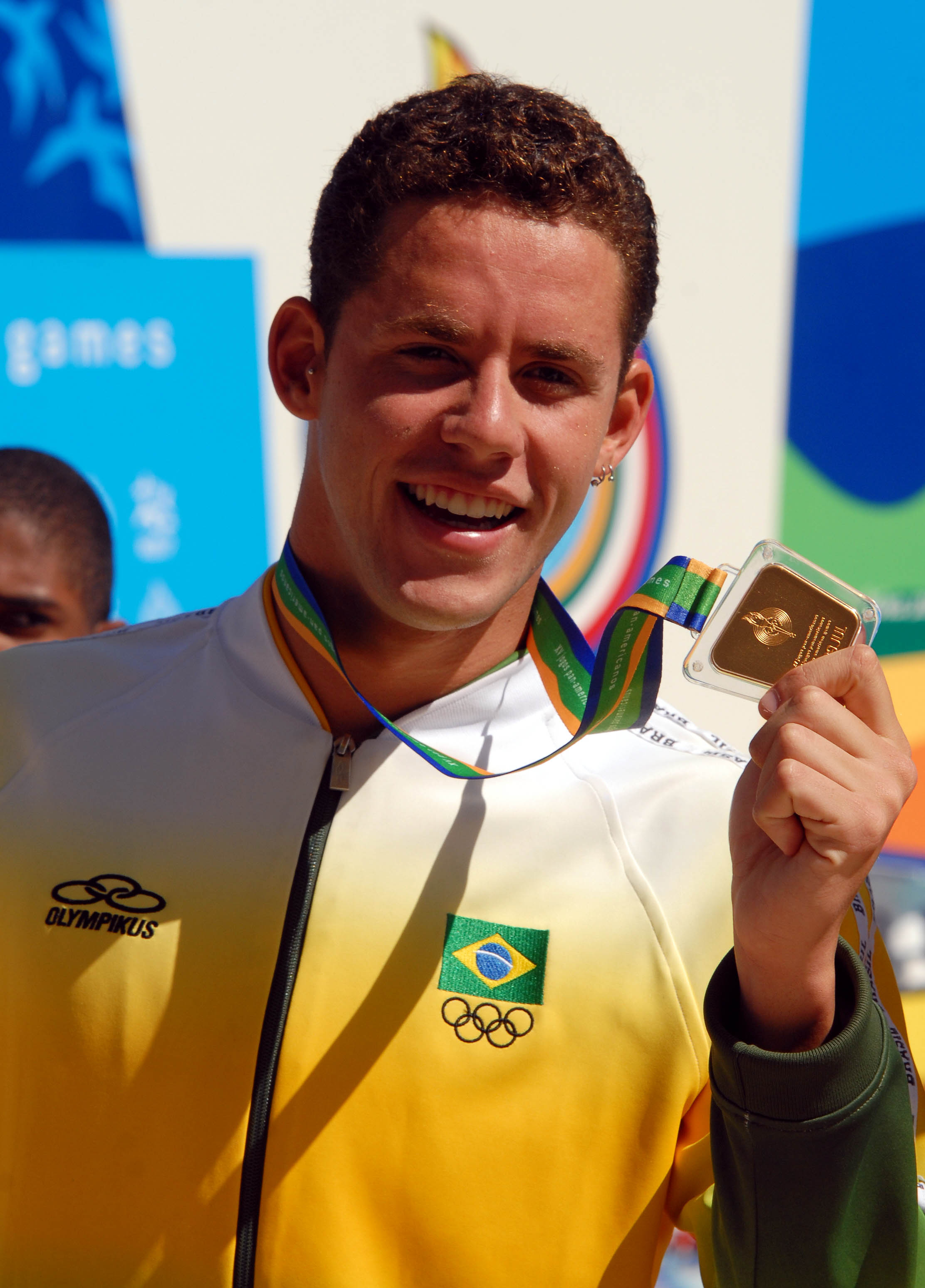
Brazilian swimmer Thiago Pereira set a Pan American record eight medals (6 gold, 1 silver, 1 bronze), seen here after the men's 200 metre individual medley competition.

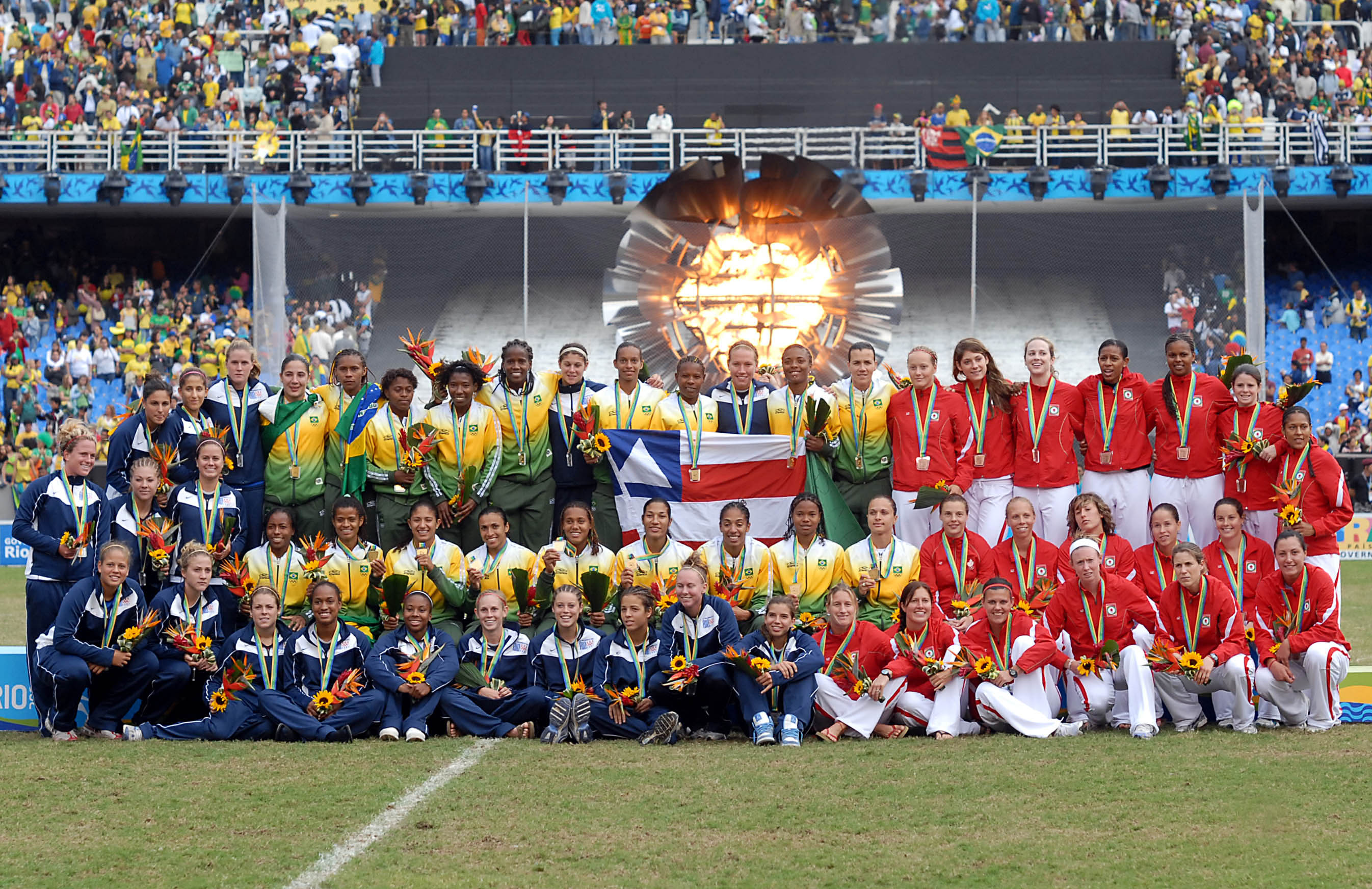
Brazil, the United States and Canada during the award ceremony of the women's football tournament.

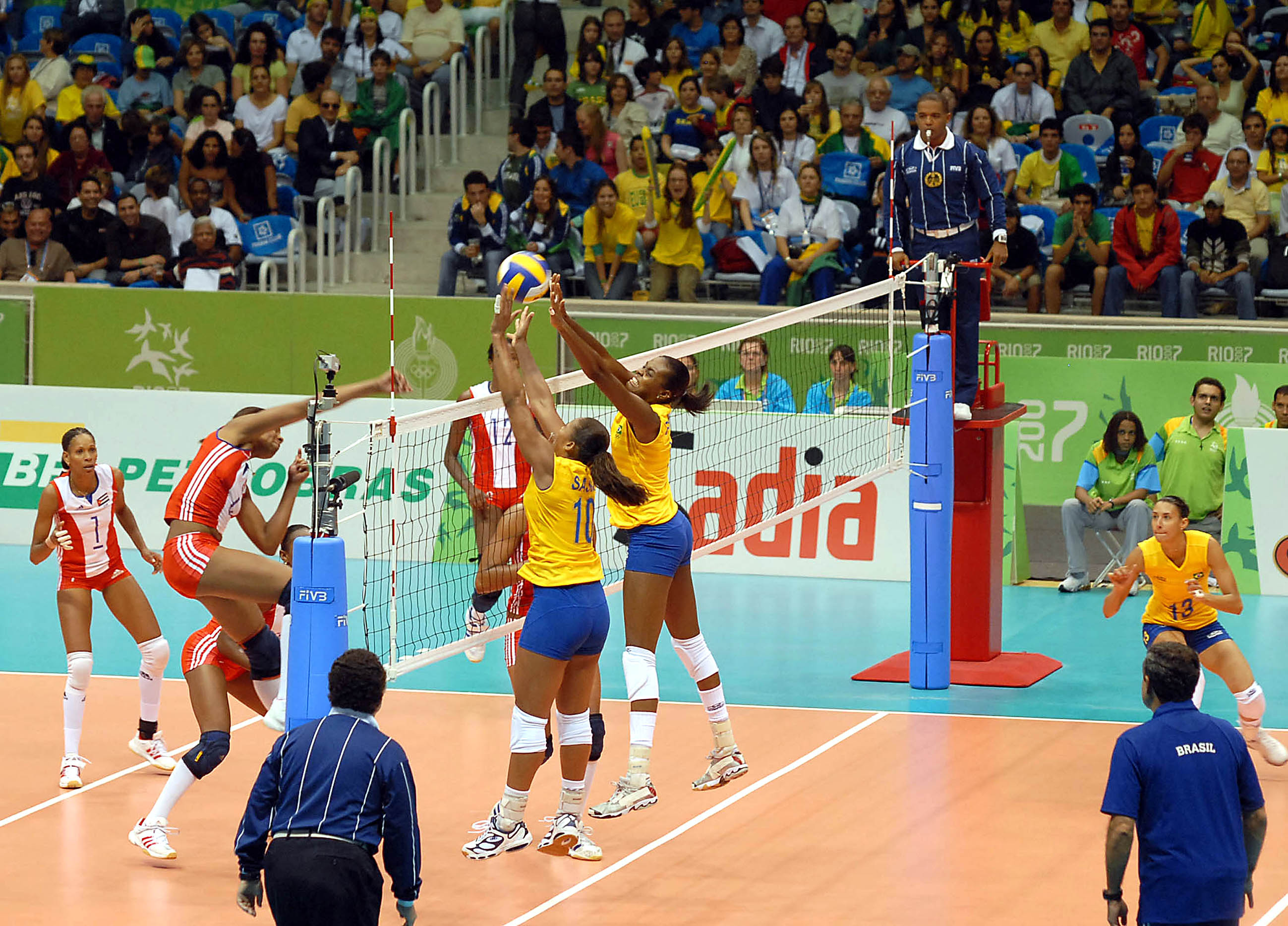
Athletes from the Cuban team and the Brazilian team during the women's volleyball tournament final match, won by Cuba.

The ranking in this table is based on the official medal standings approved by the executive committee of the Pan American Sports Organization (PASO) on December 18, 2007. By default, the table is ordered by the number of gold medals won by the athletes representing a nation. (In this context, a nation is an entity represented by an NOC). The number of silver medals is taken into consideration next and then the number of bronze medals. If nations are still tied, equal ranking is given and they are listed alphabetically by IOC country code.

In boxing, judo, taekwondo and wrestling, two bronze medals were awarded in each weight class. In baseball, atypical rainfall during the games forced the Rio de Janeiro Organizing Committee for the Pan American Games to rearrange the schedule, and the competition for the bronze medal never took place. Mexico had to leave on the previously assigned date without playing for the third position. Therefore, the technical delegate ruled that Mexico and Nicaragua were each to be awarded a bronze medal.

* Host nation (Brazil)

Rank	NOC	Gold	Silver	Bronze	Total
1	United States	97	88	52	237
2	Cuba	59	35	41	135
3	Brazil*	52	40	65	157
4	Canada	39	44	55	138
5	Mexico	18	24	31	73
6	Colombia	14	20	13	47
7	Venezuela	12	23	35	70
8	Argentina	11	16	33	60
9	Dominican Republic	6	6	17	29
10	Chile	6	5	9	20
11	Ecuador	5	4	10	19
12	Puerto Rico	3	6	12	21
13	Jamaica	3	5	1	9
14	Guatemala	2	3	2	7
15	Bahamas	2	2	3	7
16	El Salvador^{[a]}	1	3	6	10
17	Panama	1	1	0	2
18	Antigua and Barbuda^{[a]}	1	0	2	3
19	Netherlands Antilles	1	0	1	2
20	Peru	0	4	8	12
21	Trinidad and Tobago	0	1	3	4
22	Uruguay	0	1	2	3
23	Cayman Islands	0	1	0	1
24	Nicaragua	0	0	2	2
25	Barbados	0	0	1	1
25	Dominica	0	0	1	1
25	Grenada	0	0	1	1
25	Guyana	0	0	1	1
25	Haiti	0	0	1	1
25	Honduras	0	0	1	1
25	Paraguay	0	0	1	1
25	Saint Lucia	0	0	1	1
Totals (32 entries)		333	332	411	1,076

- ^[a] First ever gold medal

=== NOCs without medals ===
- Aruba
- Bermuda
- Belize
- Bolivia
- Costa Rica
- British Virgin Islands
- Virgin Islands
- Saint Kitts and Nevis
- Suriname
- Saint Vincent and the Grenadines

== Changes in medal standings ==
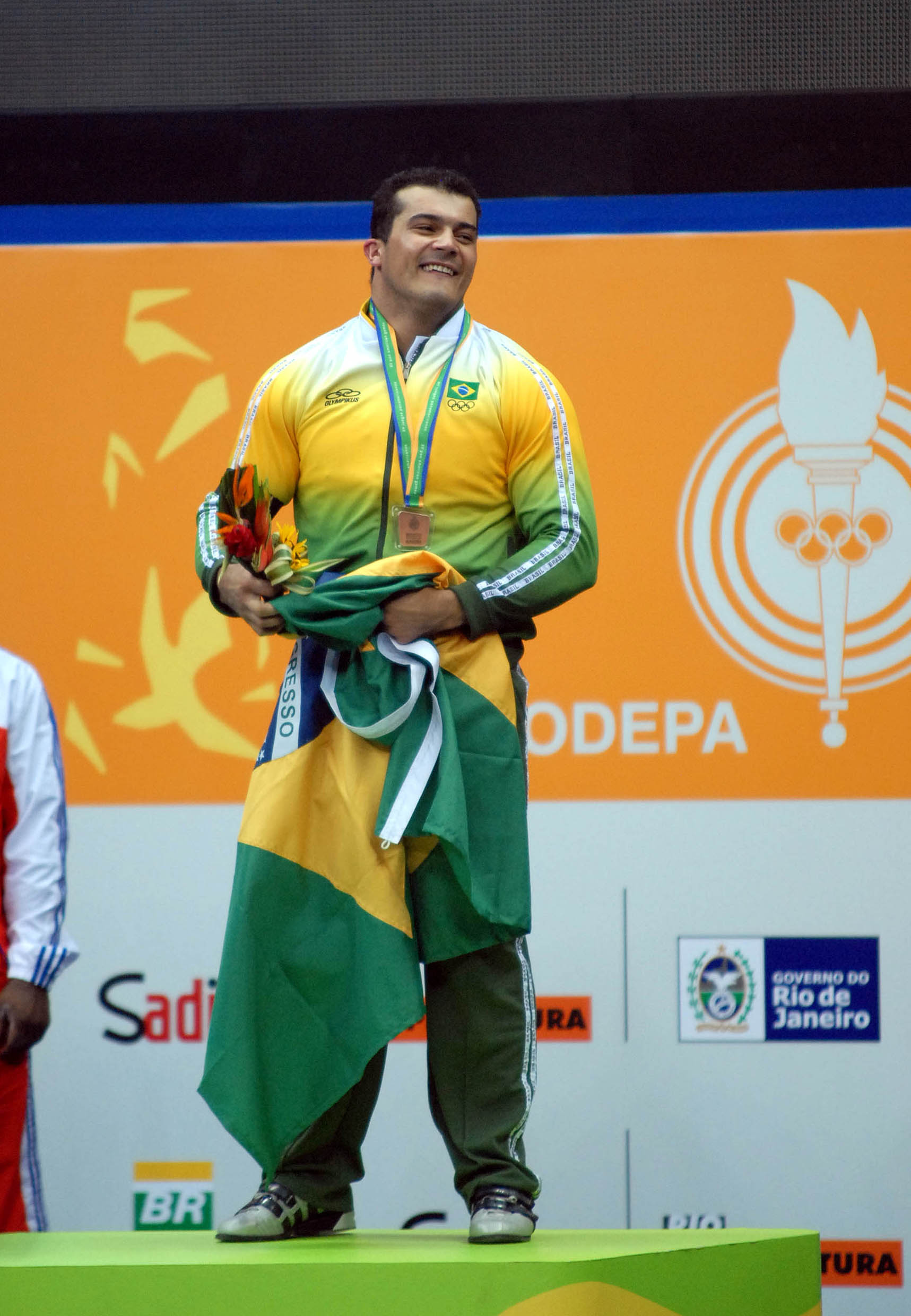
Brazilian weightlifter Fabrício Mafra lost his bronze medal to Damian Abbiate, from Argentina, at the men's 105 kg competition.

The event closed on July 29 without a positive test for illegal drugs. During the closing ceremony of the Games, the Rio de Janeiro Organizing Committee called them the "cleanest [Games] yet". Mario Vazquez Raña, president of PASO, stated at the closing ceremony that the games had been the cleanest in Pan American history. However, shortly after the games ended, prohibited substances were detected in 4 of 1,262 tests. Following procedures recommended by the World Anti-Doping Agency (WADA), the PASO Medical Commission conducted an extensive review and submitted a report to the PASO Executive Committee. On December 18, 2007, the executive committee unanimously approved it, stripping the medals from four athletes and ordering an adjustment of the medal table.

Brazilian swimmer Rebeca Gusmão tested positive for high levels of testosterone and was stripped of her four medals. She had won two gold medals in the 50 metre freestyle and 100 metre freestyle competitions, and another two medals with the Brazilian team; a silver medal at the 4 × 100 metre freestyle relay competition, and a bronze medal at the 4 × 100 metre medley relay competition. Gusmão's gold medal in the 50 metre freestyle went to Arlene Semeco of Venezuela, the silver medal to Vanessa García Vega of Puerto Rico, and the bronze medal to Flávia Delaroli of Brazil. She also lost her gold medal to Semeco in the 100 metre freestyle; Delaroli received the silver medal, and García Vega received the bronze medal. The Brazilian swimming team lost its silver medal in the 4 × 100 metre freestyle relay competition to the Canadian team, which passed the bronze medal to the Venezuelan team; and in the 4 × 100 metre medley relay competition Brazil lost its bronze medal to the Bahamian team.

Brazilian weightlifter Fabrício Mafra lost his bronze medal in the men's 105 kg competition. He tested positive for abnormal levels of testosterone, and Damian Abbiate, the competitor from Argentina, received the medal in his place. Colombian cyclist Libardo Niño Corridor, who won a silver medal in the men's individual road time trial, tested positive for the banned substance erythropoietin (EPO), and consequently the silver medal went to Matias Medici of Argentina and the bronze medal to Dominique Rollin of Canada. Nicaraguan baseball player Pedro Wilder Rayo Rojas tested positive for the banned anabolic steroid boldenone, and lost his bronze medal from the men's baseball competition, but his teammates kept their medals.

Sport	Event	Nation	Gold	Silver	Bronze	Total
Swimming	Women's 50m Freestyle	Brazil	↓ 1	↔	↑ 1	↔
Swimming	Women's 50m Freestyle	Venezuela	↑ 1	↓ 1	↔	↔
Swimming	Women's 50m Freestyle	Puerto Rico	↔	↑ 1	↓ 1	↔
Swimming	Women's 100m Freestyle	Brazil	↓ 1	↑ 1	↓ 1	↓ 1
Swimming	Women's 100m Freestyle	Venezuela	↑ 1	↓ 1	↔	↔
Swimming	Women's 100m Freestyle	Puerto Rico	↔	↔	↑ 1	↑ 1
Swimming	Women's 4 × 100 m freestyle relay	Brazil	↔	↓ 1	↔	↓ 1
Swimming	Women's 4 × 100 m freestyle relay	Canada	↔	↑ 1	↓ 1	↔
Swimming	Women's 4 × 100 m freestyle relay	Venezuela	↔	↔	↑ 1	↑ 1
Swimming	Women's 4 × 100 m medley relay	Brazil	↔	↔	↓ 1	↓ 1
Swimming	Women's 4 × 100 m medley relay	Bahamas	↔	↔	↑ 1	↑ 1
Cycling	Men's Road individual time trial	Colombia	↔	↓ 1	↔	↓ 1
Cycling	Men's Road individual time trial	Argentina	↔	↑ 1	↓ 1	↔
Cycling	Men's Road individual time trial	Canada	↔	↔	↑ 1	↑ 1
Weightlifting	Men's 105 kg category	Brazil	↔	↔	↓ 1	↓ 1
Weightlifting	Men's 105 kg category	Argentina	↔	↔	↑ 1	↑ 1
Total		Argentina	↔	↑ 1	↔	↑ 1
Total		Bahamas	↔	↔	↑ 1	↑ 1
Total		Brazil	↓ 2	↔	↓ 2	↓ 4
Total		Canada	↔	↑ 1	↔	↑ 1
Total		Colombia	↔	↓ 1	↔	↓ 1
Total		Puerto Rico	↔	↑ 1	↔	↑ 1
Total		Venezuela	↑ 2	↓ 2	↑ 1	↑ 1
