= Beach volleyball at the 2007 Pan American Games =

- Venue: Copacabana Arena
- Dates: 16–22 July 2007
- Competitors: 32

The beach volleyball tournaments at the 2007 Pan American Games were held from 16 to 22 July 2007 at the Arena de Copacabana, in Rio de Janeiro, Brazil.

== Medal summary ==
=== Medal table ===
Key

* Host nation (Brazil)

Rank	Nation	Gold	Silver	Bronze	Total
1	Brazil*	2	0	0	2
2	Cuba	0	1	1	2
3	United States	0	1	0	1
4	Mexico	0	0	1	1
Totals (4 entries)		2	2	2	6

== Men's tournament ==
Rank	Final ranking
Gold medal	Emanuel Rego and Ricardo Santos (BRA)
Silver medal	Ty Loomis and Hans Stolfus (USA)
Bronze medal	Francisco Álvarez and Leonel Munder (CUB)
4.	Jason Kruger and Wes Montgomery (CAN)
5.	Lombardo Ontiveros and Ulises Ontiveros (MEX)
5.	Fabio Dalmas and Nicolas Zanotta (URU)
5.	Marcelo Araya and Jonathan Guevara (CRC)
5.	Joaquín Acosta and Joseph Gil (PUR)
9.	Jackson Henríquez and Igor Hernández (VEN)
9.	Juan Carlos Chamy and Mauricio Recabarren (CHI)
9.	Jeovanny Medrano and David Vargas (ESA)
9.	Fabio Perez and Pablo Suarez (ARG)
13.	Julio Bardales García and Daniel Maldonado (ECU)
13.	Rafael Cabrales and Diego Naranjo (COL)
13.	Winston Calderon and Francisco Castro (NCA)
13.	Jorge Bolaños and José Gonzales (GUA)

== Women's tournament ==
Rank	Final ranking
Gold medal	Juliana Felisberta and Larissa França (BRA)
Silver medal	Dalixia Fernández and Tamara Larrea (CUB)
Bronze medal	Bibiana Candelas and Mayra García (MEX)
4.	Marie-Andree Lessard and Sarah Maxwell (CAN)
5.	Karina Cardoza and Mariana Guerrero (URU)
5.	Karina Hernández and Mercedes Mena (ECU)
5.	Angie Akers and Brooke Hanson (USA)
5.	Andrea Galindo and Claudia Galindo (COL)
9.	Laura Molina and Yvonne Soler (ESA)
9.	Heissell Carcache and Heidy Rostrán (NCA)
9.	Nathalia Alfaro and Ingrid Morales (CRC)
9.	María Orellana and Anna Ramírez (GUA)
13.	Maria Elena Evangelista and Jana Ortíz (ARG)
13.	Wilmerys Muñoz and Orquidea Vera (VEN)
13.	Nancy Joseph and Elki Philip (TRI)
13.	Annia Ruiz and Yamileska Yantín (PUR)

== See also ==
- Volleyball at the 2007 Pan American Games
