= Weightlifting at the 2007 Pan American Games – Women's 63 kg =

Weightlifting – Women's 63 kg at the 2007 Pan American Games
- Venue: Complexo Esportivo Riocentro
- Dates: 16 July 2007
- Competitors: 9 from 8 nations
- Winning total weight: 224 kg

Medalists
Gold medal	Leydi Solís	Colombia
Silver medal	Christine Girard	Canada
Bronze medal	Natalie Woolfolk	United States

The Women's 63 kg weightlifting event at the 2007 Pan American Games took place at the Complexo Esportivo Riocentro on 16 July 2007.

== Schedule ==
All times are Brasilia Time (UTC-3)

Date	Time	Event
16 July 2007	16:00	Group A

== Records ==
Prior to this competition, the existing world, Pan American and Games records were as follows:

World record	Snatch	Pawina Thongsuk (THA)	116 kg	Doha, Qatar	12 November 2005
World record	Clean & Jerk	Pawina Thongsuk (THA)	142 kg	Doha, Qatar	4 December 2006
World record	Total	Pawina Thongsuk (THA)	256 kg	Doha, Qatar	12 November 2005
Pan American record	Snatch				
Pan American record	Clean & Jerk				
Pan American record	Total				
Games record	Snatch	Ubaldina Valoyes (COL)	95 kg	Santo Domingo, Dominican Republic	14 August 2003
Games record	Clean & Jerk	Ubaldina Valoyes (COL)	115 kg	Santo Domingo, Dominican Republic	14 August 2003
Games record	Total	Ubaldina Valoyes (COL)	210 kg	Santo Domingo, Dominican Republic	14 August 2003

The following records were established during the competition:

Snatch	97 kg	Leydi Solís (COL)	GR
Snatch	98 kg	Natalie Woolfolk (USA)	GR
Snatch	100 kg	Leydi Solís (COL)	GR
Clean & Jerk	120 kg	Christine Girard (CAN)	GR
Clean & Jerk	124 kg	Leydi Solís (COL)	GR
Clean & Jerk	127 kg	Christine Girard (CAN)	GR
Total	213 kg	Natalie Woolfolk (USA)	GR
Total	214 kg	Christine Girard (CAN)	GR
Total	220 kg	Leydi Solís (COL)	GR
Total	224 kg	Leydi Solís (COL)	GR

== Results ==
Rank	Athlete	Nation	Group	Body weight	Snatch (kg)					Clean & Jerk (kg)					Total
Rank	Athlete	Nation	Group	Body weight	1	2	3	Result	Rank	1	2	3	Result	Rank	Total
1st place, gold medalist(s)	Leydi Solís	Colombia	A	62.75	97	~~100~~	100	100	1	120	~~124~~	124	124	2	224
2nd place, silver medalist(s)	Christine Girard	Canada	A	63.00	~~94~~	~~94~~	94	94	3	120	127	~~131~~	127	1	221
3rd place, bronze medalist(s)	Natalie Woolfolk	United States	A	62.60	~~98~~	98	~~100~~	98	2	110	115	~~117~~	115	3	213
4	Liliane Menezes	Brazil	A	62.55	83	87	90	90	4	102	106	~~110~~	106	5	196
5	Tania Whalen	Canada	A	61.65	83	86	~~88~~	86	5	103	106	109	109	4	195
6	Edilia Amorós	Cuba	A	62.60	68	73	75	75	6	88	93	95	95	6	170
–	Luz Acosta	Mexico	A	62.50	~~97~~	~~97~~	~~97~~	–	–	–	–	–	–	–	–
–	Solsiris Francisco	Puerto Rico	A	62.40	~~92~~	~~92~~	~~92~~	–	–	–	–	–	–	–	–
–	Gaby Gutierrez	Peru	A	62.05	~~67~~	~~70~~	~~70~~	–	–	–	–	–	–	–	–
