= Weightlifting at the 2007 Pan American Games – Men's 77 kg =

Weightlifting – Men's 77 kg at the 2007 Pan American Games
- Venue: Complexo Esportivo Riocentro
- Dates: 16 July 2007
- Competitors: 10 from 8 nations
- Winning total weight: 350 kg

Medalists
Gold medal	Iván Cambar	Cuba
Silver medal	José Ocando	Venezuela
Bronze medal	Octavio Mejías	Venezuela

The Men's 77 kg weightlifting event at the 2007 Pan American Games took place at the Complexo Esportivo Riocentro on 16 July 2007.

== Schedule ==
All times are Brasilia Time (UTC-3)

Date	Time	Event
16 July 2007	14:00	Group A

== Records ==
Prior to this competition, the existing world, Pan American and Games records were as follows:

World record	Snatch	Sergey Filimonov (KAZ)	173 kg	Almaty, Kazakhstan	9 April 2004
World record	Clean & Jerk	Oleg Perepetchenov (RUS)	210 kg	Trenčín, Slovakia	27 April 2001
World record	Total	Plamen Zhelyazkov (BUL)	377 kg	Doha, Qatar	27 March 2002
Pan American record	Snatch	Pablo Lara (CUB)	160 kg	Pinar del Río, Cuba	8 May 1998
Pan American record	Clean & Jerk	Idalberto Aranda (CUB)	205 kg	Winnipeg, Canada	5 August 1999
Pan American record	Total	Idalberto Aranda (CUB)	355 kg	Winnipeg, Canada	5 August 1999
Games record	Snatch		150 kg	Winnipeg, Canada	5 August 1999
Games record	Clean & Jerk	Idalberto Aranda (CUB)	205 kg	Winnipeg, Canada	5 August 1999
Games record	Total	Idalberto Aranda (CUB)	355 kg	Winnipeg, Canada	5 August 1999

The following records were established during the competition:

Snatch	151 kg	Octavio Mejías (VEN)	GR
Snatch	154 kg	Julio Idrovo (ECU)	GR
Snatch	156 kg	Iván Cambar (CUB)	GR

== Results ==
Rank	Athlete	Nation	Group	Body weight	Snatch (kg)					Clean & Jerk (kg)					Total
Rank	Athlete	Nation	Group	Body weight	1	2	3	Result	Rank	1	2	3	Result	Rank	Total
1st place, gold medalist(s)	Iván Cambar	Cuba	A	76.65	150	156	~~161~~	156	1	185	190	194	194	1	350
2nd place, silver medalist(s)	José Ocando	Venezuela	A	76.85	140	145	~~148~~	140	7	184	190	192	192	2	337
3rd place, bronze medalist(s)	Octavio Mejías	Venezuela	A	76.15	~~147~~	147	151	151	3	181	185	~~188~~	185	4	336
4	Carlos Andica	Colombia	A	76.55	148	~~151~~	151	151	4	183	~~186~~	~~187~~	183	5	334
5	Chad Vaughn	United States	A	76.85	141	145	~~148~~	145	6	~~182~~	184	187	187	3	332
6	Matt Bruce	United States	A	76.85	140	145	148	148	5	175	180	~~185~~	180	6	328
7	Julio Idrovo	Ecuador	A	76.25	154	~~157~~	~~157~~	154	2	170	~~175~~	~~175~~	170	8	324
8	Esteban Radilla	Mexico	A	76.40	130	135	~~137~~	135	8	165	170	~~173~~	170	9	305
9	Victor Viquez	Panama	A	76.25	130	~~135~~	~~135~~	130	9	170	~~175~~	~~175~~	170	7	300
10	Mauricio de Marino	Uruguay	A	75.10	114	~~118~~	~~118~~	114	10	143	~~148~~	~~148~~	143	10	257
