= Weightlifting at the 2007 Pan American Games – Women's 58 kg =

Weightlifting – Women's 58 kg at the 2007 Pan American Games
- Venue: Complexo Esportivo Riocentro
- Dates: 15 July 2007
- Competitors: 10 from 10 nations
- Winning total weight: 223 kg

Medalists
| Gold medal | Alexandra Escobar | Ecuador |
| Silver medal | Rusmeris Villar | Colombia |
| Bronze medal | María Cecilia Floriddia | Argentina |

The Women's 58 kg weightlifting event at the 2007 Pan American Games took place at the Complexo Esportivo Riocentro on 15 July 2007.

== Schedule ==
All times are Brasilia Time (UTC-3)

| Date | Time | Event |
|---|---|---|
| 15 July 2007 | 18:00 | Group A |

== Records ==
Prior to this competition, the existing world, Pan American and Games records were as follows:

| World record | Snatch | Chen Yanqing (CHN) | 111 kg | Doha, Qatar | 3 December 2006 |
| World record | Clean & Jerk | Qiu Hongmei (CHN) | 141 kg | Tai'an, China | 23 April 2007 |
| World record | Total | Chen Yanqing (CHN) | 251 kg | Doha, Qatar | 3 December 2006 |
| Pan American record | Snatch | | | | |
| Pan American record | Clean & Jerk | | | | |
| Pan American record | Total | | | | |
| Games record | Snatch | Alexandra Escobar (ECU) | 92 kg | Santo Domingo, Dominican Republic | 13 August 2003 |
| Games record | Clean & Jerk | Alexandra Escobar (ECU) | 117 kg | Santo Domingo, Dominican Republic | 13 August 2003 |
| Games record | Total | Alexandra Escobar (ECU) | 210 kg | Santo Domingo, Dominican Republic | 13 August 2003 |

The following records were established during the competition:

| Snatch | 96 kg | Alexandra Escobar (ECU) | GR |
| Snatch | 98 kg | Alexandra Escobar (ECU) | GR |
| Clean & Jerk | 122 kg | Alexandra Escobar (ECU) | GR |
| Clean & Jerk | 125 kg | Alexandra Escobar (ECU) | GR |
| Total | 215 kg | Alexandra Escobar (ECU) | GR |
| Total | 220 kg | Alexandra Escobar (ECU) | GR |
| Total | 223 kg | Alexandra Escobar (ECU) | GR |

== Results ==
| Rank | Athlete | Nation | Group | Body weight | Snatch (kg) | | | | | Clean & Jerk (kg) | | | | | Total |
| Rank | Athlete | Nation | Group | Body weight | 1 | 2 | 3 | Result | Rank | 1 | 2 | 3 | Result | Rank | Total |
|---|---|---|---|---|---|---|---|---|---|---|---|---|---|---|---|
| 1st place, gold medalist(s) | Alexandra Escobar | Ecuador | A | 57.35 | 92 | 96 | 98 | 98 | 1 | 117 | 122 | 125 | 125 | 1 | 223 |
| 2nd place, silver medalist(s) | Rusmeris Villar | Colombia | A | 57.05 | 88 | 90 | ~~92~~ | 90 | 2 | 110 | ~~114~~ | 114 | 114 | 2 | 204 |
| 3rd place, bronze medalist(s) | María Cecilia Floriddia | Argentina | A | 57.45 | 86 | 90 | ~~92~~ | 90 | 3 | 107 | ~~110~~ | 110 | 110 | 3 | 200 |
| 4 | Gretty Lugo | Venezuela | A | 57.55 | 85 | ~~88~~ | 88 | 88 | 4 | ~~108~~ | 108 | ~~110~~ | 108 | 5 | 196 |
| 5 | Geralee Vega | Puerto Rico | A | 57.80 | ~~85~~ | ~~85~~ | 85 | 85 | 6 | 110 | ~~116~~ | ~~116~~ | 110 | 4 | 195 |
| 6 | Jacquelynn Berube | United States | A | 57.85 | 83 | 86 | ~~88~~ | 86 | 5 | 100 | 105 | ~~108~~ | 105 | 7 | 191 |
| 7 | Wildri de los Santos | Dominican Republic | A | 57.35 | ~~80~~ | 80 | 84 | 84 | 7 | ~~106~~ | ~~106~~ | 106 | 106 | 6 | 190 |
| 8 | Quisia Guicho | Mexico | A | 58.00 | 78 | ~~82~~ | 82 | 82 | 8 | 103 | ~~108~~ | ~~108~~ | 103 | 8 | 185 |
| 9 | Valérie Lefebvre | Canada | A | 57.75 | 75 | ~~78~~ | 78 | 78 | 9 | 93 | 96 | 98 | 98 | 9 | 176 |
| 10 | Eliane Silva | Brazil | A | 57.00 | 70 | 75 | ~~78~~ | 75 | 10 | ~~90~~ | ~~90~~ | 90 | 90 | 10 | 165 |
