= Weightlifting at the 2007 Pan American Games – Women's 53 kg =

Weightlifting – Women's 53 kg at the 2007 Pan American Games
- Venue: Complexo Esportivo Riocentro
- Dates: 15 July 2007
- Competitors: 8 from 7 nations
- Winning total weight: 207 kg

Medalists
Gold medal	Yuderqui Contreras	Dominican Republic
Silver medal	Ana Margot Lemos	Colombia
Bronze medal	Melanie Roach	United States

The Women's 53 kg weightlifting event at the 2007 Pan American Games took place at the Complexo Esportivo Riocentro on 15 July 2007.

== Schedule ==
All times are Brasilia Time (UTC-3)

Date	Time	Event
15 July 2007	14:00	Group A

== Records ==
Prior to this competition, the existing world, Pan American and Games records were as follows:

World record	Snatch	Ri Song-hui (PRK)	102 kg	Busan, South Korea	1 October 2002
World record	Clean & Jerk	Li Ping (CHN)	129 kg	Tai'an, China	22 April 2007
World record	Total	Qiu Hongxia (CHN)	226 kg	Santo Domingo, Dominican Republic	2 October 2006
Pan American record	Snatch				
Pan American record	Clean & Jerk				
Pan American record	Total				
Games record	Snatch	Robin Goad (USA)	85 kg	Winnipeg, Canada	24 July 1999
Games record	Clean & Jerk	Mabel Mosquera (COL)	110 kg	Santo Domingo, Dominican Republic	13 August 2003
Games record	Total	Mabel Mosquera (COL)	195 kg	Santo Domingo, Dominican Republic	13 August 2003

The following records were established during the competition:

Snatch	86 kg	Yuderqui Contreras (DOM)	GR
Snatch	90 kg	Yuderqui Contreras (DOM)	GR
Snatch	95 kg	Yuderqui Contreras (DOM)	GR
Clean & Jerk	112 kg	Yuderqui Contreras (DOM)	GR
Total	202 kg	Yuderqui Contreras (DOM)	GR
Total	207 kg	Yuderqui Contreras (DOM)	GR

== Results ==
Rank	Athlete	Nation	Group	Body weight	Snatch (kg)					Clean & Jerk (kg)					Total
Rank	Athlete	Nation	Group	Body weight	1	2	3	Result	Rank	1	2	3	Result	Rank	Total
1st place, gold medalist(s)	Yuderqui Contreras	Dominican Republic	A	52.75	86	90	95	95	1	107	~~112~~	112	112	1	207
2nd place, silver medalist(s)	Ana Margot Lemos	Colombia	A	52.65	80	~~84~~	84	84	2	102	106	~~111~~	106	3	190
3rd place, bronze medalist(s)	Melanie Roach	United States	A	52.70	74	~~77~~	~~77~~	74	4	101	104	108	108	2	182
4	Inmara Henríquez	Venezuela	A	52.70	75	77	78	78	3	100	103	~~105~~	103	4	181
5	Widalys Arroyo	Puerto Rico	A	52.70	70	~~75~~	~~75~~	70	5	95	100	~~105~~	100	5	170
6	Valdirene Apare Laia	Brazil	A	51.80	63	65	67	67	6	80	83	84	84	6	151
7	Silvia Artola	Nicaragua	A	52.85	65	~~70~~	~~70~~	65	8	~~80~~	80	~~82~~	80	7	145
8	Rosane Santos	Brazil	A	52.15	67	~~71~~	~~71~~	67	7	~~77~~	~~77~~	77	77	8	144
