= Weightlifting at the 2007 Pan American Games – Men's 69 kg =

Weightlifting – Men's 69 kg at the 2007 Pan American Games
- Venue: Complexo Esportivo Riocentro
- Dates: 15 July 2007
- Competitors: 10 from 10 nations
- Winning total weight: 317 kg

Medalists
Gold medal	Yordanis Borrero	Cuba
Silver medal	Edwin Mosquera	Colombia
Bronze medal	Ricardo Flores	Ecuador

The Men's 69 kg weightlifting event at the 2007 Pan American Games took place at the Complexo Esportivo Riocentro on 15 July 2007.

== Schedule ==
All times are Brasilia Time (UTC-3)

Date	Time	Event
15 July 2007	16:00	Group A

== Records ==
Prior to this competition, the existing world, Pan American and Games records were as follows:

World record	Snatch	Georgi Markov (BUL)	165 kg	Sydney, Australia	20 September 2000
World record	Clean & Jerk	Zhang Guozheng (CHN)	197 kg	Qinhuangdao, China	11 September 2003
World record	Total	Galabin Boevski (BUL)	357 kg	Athens, Greece	24 November 1999
Pan American record	Snatch				
Pan American record	Clean & Jerk				
Pan American record	Total				
Games record	Snatch	Yordanis Borrero (CUB)	147 kg	Santo Domingo, Dominican Republic	13 August 2003
Games record	Clean & Jerk	Amílcar Pernía (VEN)	180 kg	Santo Domingo, Dominican Republic	13 August 2003
Games record	Total	Yordanis Borrero (CUB)	317 kg	Santo Domingo, Dominican Republic	13 August 2003

== Results ==
Rank	Athlete	Nation	Group	Body weight	Snatch (kg)					Clean & Jerk (kg)					Total
Rank	Athlete	Nation	Group	Body weight	1	2	3	Result	Rank	1	2	3	Result	Rank	Total
1st place, gold medalist(s)	Yordanis Borrero	Cuba	A	68.55	137	~~141~~	141	141	2	166	172	176	176	1	317
2nd place, silver medalist(s)	Edwin Mosquera	Colombia	A	68.45	138	141	~~142~~	141	1	168	172	~~176~~	172	2	313
3rd place, bronze medalist(s)	Ricardo Flores	Ecuador	A	68.00	130	135	138	138	3	~~170~~	170	~~175~~	170	3	308
4	Santo Rivera	Dominican Republic	A	68.10	~~133~~	133	~~138~~	133	5	170	~~176~~	~~176~~	170	4	303
5	Israel José Rubio	Venezuela	A	67.55	~~137~~	137	~~142~~	137	4	~~163~~	~~163~~	163	163	6	300
6	Welisson Silva	Brazil	A	68.25	125	130	133	133	6	158	165	~~170~~	165	5	298
7	Alexi Batista	Panama	A	68.15	132	~~136~~	~~136~~	132	7	~~160~~	160	~~166~~	160	7	292
8	Roger Couoh	Mexico	A	68.85	110	115	~~120~~	115	9	153	~~157~~	~~157~~	153	8	268
9	Marvín Martínez	El Salvador	A	68.25	~~115~~	115	120	120	8	~~145~~	145	~~150~~	145	9	265
10	Moises Herrera	Nicaragua	A	65.80	90	100	~~105~~	100	10	115	125	~~130~~	125	10	225
