= Weightlifting at the 2007 Pan American Games – Women's 75 kg =

Weightlifting – Women's 75 kg at the 2007 Pan American Games
- Venue: Complexo Esportivo Riocentro
- Dates: 17 July 2007
- Competitors: 6 from 6 nations
- Winning total weight: 250 kg

Medalists
Gold medal	Ubaldina Valoyes	Colombia
Silver medal	Damaris Aguirre	Mexico
Bronze medal	Eva Dimas	El Salvador

The Women's 75 kg weightlifting event at the 2007 Pan American Games took place at the Complexo Esportivo Riocentro on 17 July 2007.

== Schedule ==
All times are Brasilia Time (UTC-3)

Date	Time	Event
17 July 2007	14:00	Group A

== Records ==
Prior to this competition, the existing world, Pan American and Games records were as follows:

World record	Snatch	Natalya Zabolotnaya (RUS)	130 kg	Doha, Qatar	13 November 2005
World record	Clean & Jerk	Liu Chunhong (CHN)	159 kg	Doha, Qatar	13 November 2005
World record	Total	Svetlana Podobedova (RUS)	286 kg	Hangzhou, China	2 June 2006
Pan American record	Snatch	Nora Köppel (ARG)	115 kg	Doha, Qatar	13 November 2005
Pan American record	Clean & Jerk				
Pan American record	Total				
Games record	Snatch	Wanda Rijo (DOM)	107 kg	Santo Domingo, Dominican Republic	16 August 2003
Games record	Clean & Jerk	Wanda Rijo (DOM)	130 kg	Santo Domingo, Dominican Republic	16 August 2003
Games record	Total	Wanda Rijo (DOM)	237 kg	Santo Domingo, Dominican Republic	16 August 2003

The following records were established during the competition:

Snatch	109 kg	Ubaldina Valoyes (COL)	GR
Snatch	112 kg	Ubaldina Valoyes (COL)	GR
Clean & Jerk	135 kg	Damaris Aguirre (MEX)	GR
Clean & Jerk	138 kg	Ubaldina Valoyes (COL)	GR
Total	242 kg	Ubaldina Valoyes (COL)	GR
Total	247 kg	Ubaldina Valoyes (COL)	GR
Total	250 kg	Ubaldina Valoyes (COL)	GR

== Results ==
Rank	Athlete	Nation	Group	Body weight	Snatch (kg)					Clean & Jerk (kg)					Total
Rank	Athlete	Nation	Group	Body weight	1	2	3	Result	Rank	1	2	3	Result	Rank	Total
1st place, gold medalist(s)	Ubaldina Valoyes	Colombia	A	72.50	106	109	112	112	1	130	135	138	138	1	250
2nd place, silver medalist(s)	Damaris Aguirre	Mexico	A	74.85	100	105	~~108~~	105	3	128	135	~~138~~	135	2	240
3rd place, bronze medalist(s)	Eva Dimas	El Salvador	A	74.15	103	106	~~108~~	106	2	125	~~128~~	~~129~~	125	3	231
4	Claret Bellorin	Venezuela	A	74.70	98	~~103~~	~~103~~	98	4	~~125~~	~~125~~	125	125	4	223
5	Natividad Dominguez	Dominican Republic	A	74.30	96	~~102~~	~~102~~	96	5	122	~~130~~	~~130~~	122	5	218
6	Elizabeth Poblete	Chile	A	74.30	~~85~~	~~85~~	85	85	6	105	~~112~~	~~112~~	105	6	190
