= Volleyball at the 2007 Pan American Games =

- Venues: Ginásio do Maracanãzinho (indoor); Copacabana Stadium (beach)
- Dates: 14 July – 28 July

The volleyball competitions at the 2007 Pan American Games were held from 14 to 19 July for the women and from 23 to 28 July for the men. The competitions were held at Ginásio do Maracanãzinho, located near the Estádio do Maracanã.

== Competition format ==
In both the men's and the women's competition eight teams participated of the tournament. The teams were divided in two groups of four teams each. The teams played against each other once within their groups. The two best placed teams of each group advanced to the semifinals. The teams which finished in the third and fourth place of their groups competed for the fifth and seventh places, playing the third-placed team of a group against the fourth-placed team of the other group. The winners competed for the fifth place and the losers competed for the seventh place. The semifinal winners competed for the gold medal while the losers competed for the bronze medal.

== Men's tournament ==
=== Participating teams ===
  - Pool A
- Mexico
- Canada
- Brazil
- Cuba

  - Pool B
- Argentina
- Puerto Rico
- Venezuela
- United States

=== Preliminary round ===
==== Group A ====
Team	Pts	Pld	W	L	SF	SA	Diff
Brazil	6	3	3	0	9	0	+9
Cuba	5	3	2	1	6	3	+3
Canada	4	3	1	2	3	7	-4
Mexico	3	3	0	3	1	9	-8

- 23 July

Mexico	0-3	Cuba	(20-25, 18-25, 20-25)
Brazil	3-0	Canada	(25-19, 25-18, 25-17)

- 24 July

Canada	3-1	Mexico	(17-25, 25-19, 29-27, 25-19)
Cuba	0-3	Brazil	(23-25, 20-25, 20-25)

- 25 July

Mexico	0-3	Brazil	(17-25, 23-25, 21-25)
Canada	0-3	Cuba	(19-25, 17-25, 22-25)

==== Group B ====
Team	Pts	Pld	W	L	SF	SA	Diff
United States	6	3	3	0	9	0	+9
Venezuela	5	3	2	1	6	4	+2
Puerto Rico	4	3	1	2	4	7	-3
Argentina	3	3	0	3	1	9	-8

- 23 July

Argentina	1-3	Puerto Rico	(25-22,24-26,21-25,22-25)
Venezuela	0-3	United States	(19-25, 22-25, 20-25)

- 24 July

Puerto Rico	1-3	Venezuela	(31-29,16-25,18-25,19-25)
United States	3-0	Argentina	(25-17,25-22,25-21)

- 25 July

Venezuela	3-0	Argentina	(25-17,25-21,25-21)
United States	3-0	Puerto Rico	(25-22,25-17,25-23)

=== Consolation round ===
Classification match (5th/8th place)
27 July 2007 – 13:00
Canada	2
Argentina	3
27 July 2007 – 19:00
Puerto Rico	3
Mexico	0

5th place
28 July 2007 – 22:00
Argentina	0
Puerto Rico	3
7th place
28 July 2007 – 19:00
Canada	3
Mexico	0

==== Classification match (5th/8th place) ====
- 27 July

Canada	2-3	Argentina	(25-16, 23-25, 28-30, 25-19, 23-25)
Puerto Rico	3-0	Mexico	(25-19, 25-19, 25-18)

==== Classification match (7th/8th place) ====
- 28 July

Canada	3-0	Mexico	(26-24, 25-22, 25-20)

==== Classification match (5th/6th place) ====
- 28 July

Argentina	0-3	Puerto Rico	(22-25, 22-25, 28-30)

=== Final round ===
Semifinals
27 July 2007 – 22:00
Brazil	3
Venezuela	0
27 July 2007 – 15:00
United States	3
Cuba	1

Gold medal match
28 July 2007 – 22:00
Brazil	3
United States	0
Bronze medal match
28 July 2007 – 17:00
Venezuela	2
Cuba	3

==== Semifinals ====
- 27 July

Brazil	3-0	Venezuela	(30-28, 25-18, 25-16)
United States	3-1	Cuba	(25-23, 25-17, 24-26, 25-23)

==== Bronze medal match ====
- 28 July

Cuba	3-2	Venezuela	(25-16, 23-25, 27-25, 17-25, 18-16)

==== Gold medal match ====
- 28 July

United States	0-3	Brazil	(16-25, 20-25, 22-25)

=== Final standings ===
Position	Team	Campaign (wins-losses)
1st place, gold medalist(s)	Brazil	(5-0)
2nd place, silver medalist(s)	United States	(4-1)
3rd place, bronze medalist(s)	Cuba	(3-2)
4	Venezuela	(2-3)
5	Puerto Rico	(3-2)
6	Argentina	(2-3)
7	Canada	(1-4)
8	Mexico	(0-5)

2007 Pan American Games winners

Brazil
third title

=== Individual awards ===
- Most valuable player
  - (Brazil) Gilberto Godoy
- Best attacker
  - (United States) Sean Rooney
- Best scorer
  - (Puerto Rico) Héctor Soto
- Best defender
  - (Puerto Rico) Gregory Berrios
- Best setter
  - (Brazil) Marcelo Elgarten
- Best server
  - (United States) Delano Thomas
- Best receiver
  - (Brazil) Sérgio Santos
- Best libero
  - (Brazil) Sérgio Santos
- Best blocker
  - (Cuba) Roberlandy Simon

== Women's tournament ==
=== Participating teams ===
  - Pool A
- Brazil
- Dominican Republic
- Mexico
- Peru

  - Pool B
- Costa Rica
- Cuba
- Puerto Rico
- United States

=== Preliminary round ===
==== Group A ====
Team	Pts	Pld	W	L	SF	SA	Diff
Brazil	6	3	3	0	9	0	+9
Peru	5	3	2	1	6	5	+1
Dominican Republic	4	3	1	2	5	6	-1
Mexico	3	3	0	3	0	9	-9

- 14 July

Mexico	0-3	Dominican Republic	(23-25, 16-25, 19-25)
Peru	0-3	Brazil	(15-25, 19-25, 12-25)

- 15 July

Mexico	0-3	Peru	(16-25, 23-25, 17-25)
Dominican Republic	0-3	Brazil	(26-28, 16-25, 15-25)

- 16 July

Brazil	3-0	Mexico	(25-16, 25-15, 25-17)
Dominican Republic	2-3	Peru	(25-14, 13-25, 25-23, 27-29, 8-15)

==== Group B ====
Team	Pts	Pld	W	L	SF	SA	Diff
Cuba	6	3	3	0	9	1	+8
United States	5	3	2	1	6	4	+2
Puerto Rico	4	3	1	2	5	6	-1
Costa Rica	3	3	0	3	0	9	-9

- 14 July

United States	3-0	Costa Rica	(25-9, 25-19, 25-12)
Cuba	3-1	Puerto Rico	(25-18, 25-17, 24-26, 25-23)

- 15 July

Puerto Rico	1-3	United States	(25-21, 18-25, 16-25, 22-25)
Costa Rica	0-3	Cuba	(17-25, 12-25, 25-27)

- 16 July

Costa Rica	0-3	Puerto Rico	(14-25, 19-25, 14-25)
United States	0-3	Cuba	(16-25, 23-25, 15-25)

=== Consolation round ===
Classification match (5th/8th place)
July 18, 2007 – 13:00
Dominican Republic	3
Costa Rica	0
July 18, 2007 – 19:00
Puerto Rico	3
Mexico	0

5th place
July 19, 2007 – 22:00
Dominican Republic	3
Puerto Rico	0
7th place
July 19, 2007 – 19:00
Costa Rica	2
Mexico	3

==== Classification match (5th/8th place) ====
- 18 July

Dominican Republic	3-0	Costa Rica	(25-17, 25-06, 25-15)
Puerto Rico	3-0	Mexico	(25-19, 25-21, 25-18)

==== Classification match (7th/8th place) ====
- 19 July

Costa Rica	2-3	Mexico	(17-25, 25-22, 08-25, 25-16, 12-15)

==== Classification match (5th/6th place) ====
- 19 July

Dominican Republic	3-0	Puerto Rico	(25-18, 25-23, 25-18)

=== Final round ===
Semifinals
18 July 2007 – 15:00
Brazil	3
United States	0
18 July 2007 – 22:00
Cuba	3
Peru	0

Gold medal match
19 July 2007 – 15:00
Brazil	2
Cuba	3
Bronze medal match
19 July 2007 – 13:00
United States	3
Peru	0

==== Semifinals ====
- 18 July

Brazil	3-0	United States	(25-13, 25-20, 25-20)
Cuba	3-0	Peru	(25-14, 25-23, 25-22)

==== Bronze medal match ====
- 19 July

United States	3-0	Peru	(25-22, 25-22, 25-22)

==== Gold medal match ====
- 19 July

Brazil	2-3	Cuba	(27-25, 22-25, 25-22, 32-34, 15-17)

=== Final standings ===
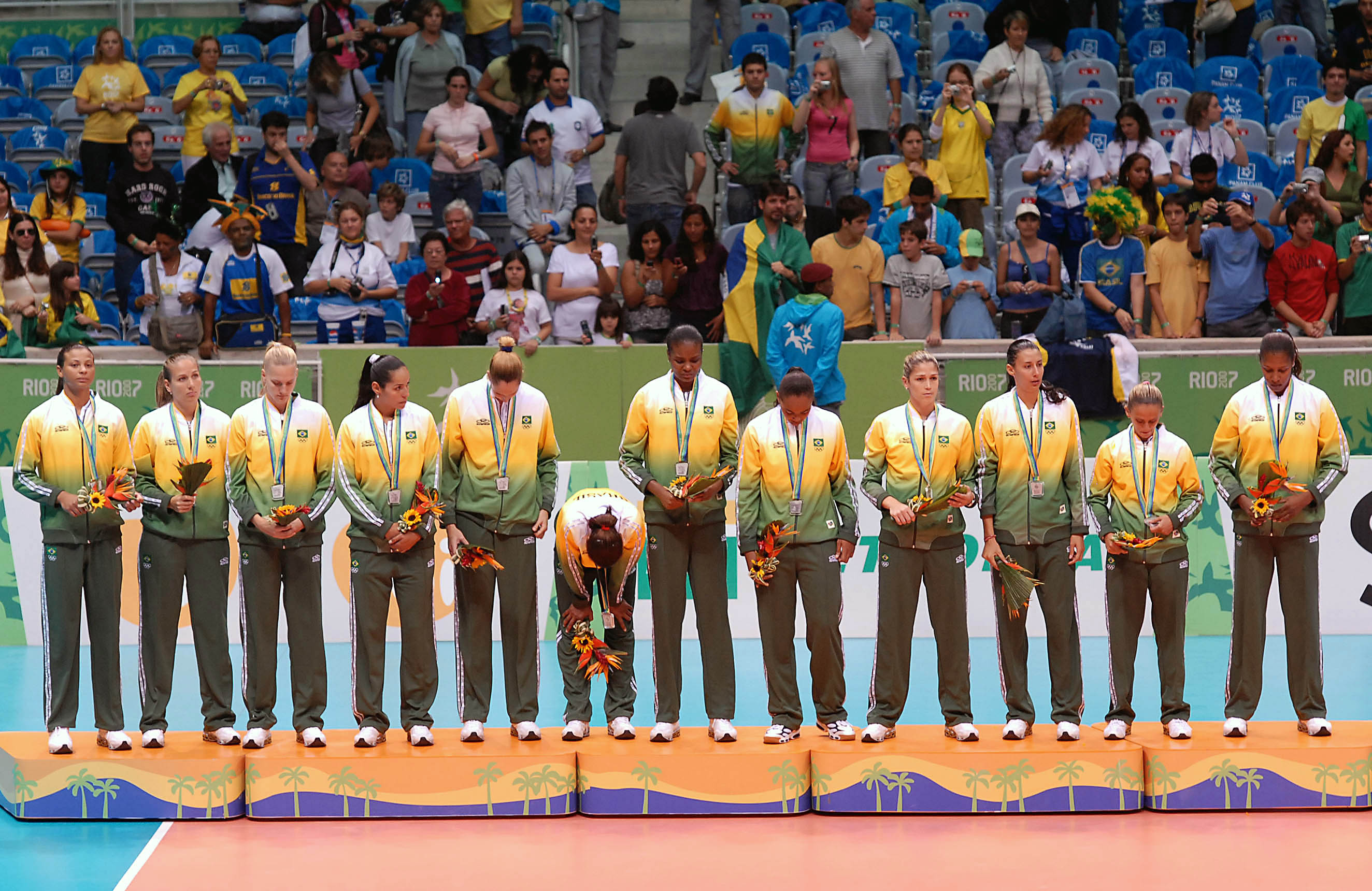
Brazil won the silver medal

Position	Team	Campaign (wins-losses)
1st place, gold medalist(s)	Cuba	(5-0)
2nd place, silver medalist(s)	Brazil	(4-1)
3rd place, bronze medalist(s)	United States	(3-2)
4	Peru	(2-3)
5	Dominican Republic	(3-2)
6	Puerto Rico	(2-3)
7	Mexico	(1-4)
8	Costa Rica	(0-5)

2007 Pan American Games winners

Cuba
eighth title

=== Individual awards ===
- Most valuable player
  - (Cuba) Nancy Carrillo
- Best attacker
  - (Cuba) Daimí Ramírez
- Best scorer
  - (Dominican Republic) Bethania de la Cruz
- Best defender
  - (Puerto Rico) Deborah Seilhamer
- Best setter
  - (Brazil) Hélia Souza
- Best server
  - (United States) Tayyiba Haneef
- Best receiver
  - (Puerto Rico) Áurea Cruz
- Best libero
  - (Dominican Republic) Carmen Rosa Caso
- Best blocker
  - (Dominican Republic) Cindy Rondón

== Notes ==
- The time of each game above, is listed in UTC-3, Brazilian official time.

== Beach ==
=== Men's tournament ===
Rank	Final ranking
Gold medal	Emanuel Rego and Ricardo Santos (BRA)
Silver medal	Ty Loomis and Hans Stolfus (USA)
Bronze medal	Francisco Álvarez and Leonel Munder (CUB)
4.	Jason Kruger and Wes Montgomery (CAN)
5.	Lombardo Ontiveros and Ulises Ontiveros (MEX)
5.	Fabio Dalmas and Nicolas Zanotta (URU)
5.	Marcelo Araya and Jonathan Guevara (CRC)
5.	Joaquín Acosta and Joseph Gil (PUR)
9.	Jackson Henríquez and Igor Hernández (VEN)
9.	Juan Carlos Chamy and Mauricio Recabarren (CHI)
9.	Jeovanny Medrano and David Vargas (ESA)
9.	Fabio Perez and Pablo Suarez (ARG)
13.	Julio Bardales García and Daniel Maldonado (ECU)
13.	Rafael Cabrales and Diego Naranjo (COL)
13.	Winston Calderon and Francisco Castro (NCA)
13.	Jorge Bolaños and José Gonzales (GUA)

=== Women's tournament ===
Rank	Final ranking
Gold medal	Juliana Felisberta and Larissa França (BRA)
Silver medal	Dalixia Fernández and Tamara Larrea (CUB)
Bronze medal	Bibiana Candelas and Mayra García (MEX)
4.	Marie-Andree Lessard and Sarah Maxwell (CAN)
5.	Karina Cardoza and Mariana Guerrero (URU)
5.	Karina Hernández and Mercedes Mena (ECU)
5.	Angie Akers and Brooke Hanson (USA)
5.	Andrea Galindo and Claudia Galindo (COL)
9.	Laura Molina and Yvonne Soler (ESA)
9.	Heissell Carcache and Heidy Rostrán (NCA)
9.	Nathalia Alfaro and Ingrid Morales (CRC)
9.	María Orellana and Anna Ramírez (GUA)
13.	Maria Elena Evangelista and Jana Ortíz (ARG)
13.	Wilmerys Muñoz and Orquidea Vera (VEN)
13.	Nancy Joseph and Elki Philip (TRI)
13.	Annia Ruiz and Yamileska Yantín (PUR)
