= Weightlifting at the 2007 Pan American Games – Women's +75 kg =

Weightlifting – Women's +75 kg at the 2007 Pan American Games
- Venue: Complexo Esportivo Riocentro
- Dates: 18 July 2007
- Competitors: 7 from 7 nations
- Winning total weight: 260 kg

Medalists
Gold medal	Oliba Nieve	Ecuador
Silver medal	Emmy Vargas	United States
Bronze medal	Yinelis Burgos	Dominican Republic

The Women's +75 kg weightlifting event at the 2007 Pan American Games took place at the Complexo Esportivo Riocentro on 18 July 2007.

== Schedule ==
All times are Brasilia Time (UTC-3)

Date	Time	Event
18 July 2007	16:00	Group A

== Records ==
Prior to this competition, the existing world, Pan American and Games records were as follows:

World record	Snatch	Mu Shuangshuang (CHN)	139 kg	Doha, Qatar	6 December 2006
World record	Clean & Jerk	Tang Gonghong (CHN)	182 kg	Athens, Greece	21 August 2004
World record	Total	Jang Mi-ran (KOR)	318 kg	Wonju, South Korea	22 May 2006
Pan American record	Snatch	Cheryl Haworth (USA)	128 kg	Chattanooga, United States	18 May 2003
Pan American record	Clean & Jerk	Cheryl Haworth (USA)	161 kg	Shreveport, United States	27 June 2005
Pan American record	Total	Cheryl Haworth (USA)	287 kg	Shreveport, United States	27 June 2005
Games record	Snatch	Carmenza Delgado (COL)	122 kg	Santo Domingo, Dominican Republic	17 August 2003
Games record	Clean & Jerk	Oliba Nieve (ECU)	145 kg	Santo Domingo, Dominican Republic	17 August 2003
Games record	Total	Carmenza Delgado (COL)	265 kg	Santo Domingo, Dominican Republic	17 August 2003

The following records were established during the competition:

Clean & Jerk	150 kg	Oliba Nieve (ECU)	GR

== Results ==
Rank	Athlete	Nation	Group	Body weight	Snatch (kg)					Clean & Jerk (kg)					Total
Rank	Athlete	Nation	Group	Body weight	1	2	3	Result	Rank	1	2	3	Result	Rank	Total
1st place, gold medalist(s)	Oliba Nieve	Ecuador	A	94.70	~~110~~	110	~~118~~	110	1	139	144	150	150	1	260
2nd place, silver medalist(s)	Emmy Vargas	United States	A	93.50	98	104	~~108~~	104	2	~~125~~	125	~~132~~	125	2	229
3rd place, bronze medalist(s)	Yinelis Burgos	Dominican Republic	A	92.35	92	97	~~103~~	97	3	~~118~~	118	~~132~~	118	4	215
4	Cristina Cornejo	Peru	A	113.15	~~85~~	85	~~90~~	85	6	110	116	120	120	3	205
5	Elizabeth Cortéz	Chile	A	119.00	80	85	88	88	5	105	~~111~~	~~113~~	105	5	193
6	Indira Salinas	Cuba	A	78.45	80	85	88	88	4	100	~~104~~	104	104	6	192
7	Eldy Salazar	Bolivia	A	109.85	75	80	~~85~~	80	7	90	~~95~~	~~95~~	90	7	170
