= Weightlifting at the 2007 Pan American Games – Men's 94 kg =

Weightlifting – Men's 94 kg at the 2007 Pan American Games
- Venue: Complexo Esportivo Riocentro
- Dates: 17 July 2007
- Competitors: 10 from 9 nations
- Winning total weight: 393 kg

Medalists
Gold medal	Yoandry Hernández	Cuba
Silver medal	Julio Luna	Venezuela
Bronze medal	Wilmer Torres	Colombia

The Men's 94 kg weightlifting event at the 2007 Pan American Games took place at the Complexo Esportivo Riocentro on 17 July 2007.

== Schedule ==
All times are Brasilia Time (UTC-3)

Date	Time	Event
17 July 2007	16:00	Group A

== Records ==
Prior to this competition, the existing world, Pan American and Games records were as follows:

World record	Snatch	Akakios Kakiasvilis (GRE)	188 kg	Athens, Greece	27 November 1999
World record	Clean & Jerk	Szymon Kołecki (POL)	232 kg	Sofia, Bulgaria	29 April 2000
World record	Total	World Standard	417 kg	–	1 January 1998
Pan American record	Snatch				
Pan American record	Clean & Jerk	Julio Luna (VEN)	220 kg	Santo Domingo, Dominican Republic	15 August 2003
Pan American record	Total	Julio Luna (VEN)	395 kg	Santo Domingo, Dominican Republic	15 August 2003
Games record	Snatch		175 kg	Winnipeg, Canada	7 August 1999
Games record	Clean & Jerk	Julio Luna (VEN)	220 kg	Santo Domingo, Dominican Republic	15 August 2003
Games record	Total	Julio Luna (VEN)	395 kg	Santo Domingo, Dominican Republic	15 August 2003

The following records were established during the competition:

Clean & Jerk	221 kg	Yoandry Hernández (CUB)	AR GR

== Results ==
Rank	Athlete	Nation	Group	Body weight	Snatch (kg)					Clean & Jerk (kg)					Total
Rank	Athlete	Nation	Group	Body weight	1	2	3	Result	Rank	1	2	3	Result	Rank	Total
1st place, gold medalist(s)	Yoandry Hernández	Cuba	A	92.55	~~165~~	165	172	172	1	207	216	221	221	1	393
2nd place, silver medalist(s)	Julio Luna	Venezuela	A	93.00	165	170	~~173~~	170	2	206	210	~~219~~	210	3	380
3rd place, bronze medalist(s)	Wilmer Torres	Colombia	A	89.90	155	163	166	166	3	200	205	210	210	2	376
4	Eduardo Guadamud	Ecuador	A	93.65	~~165~~	~~165~~	165	165	4	205	~~210~~	~~212~~	205	4	370
5	Jeffrey Wittmer	United States	A	93.05	150	155	158	158	5	192	197	~~202~~	197	5	355
6	Pablo Burla	Argentina	A	93.55	142	147	152	152	6	172	176	180	180	7	332
7	Dalas Santavy	Canada	A	91.35	135	140	~~143~~	140	9	175	180	~~185~~	180	6	320
8	Juan Jimenez	Dominican Republic	A	93.40	135	142	~~146~~	142	7	174	~~180~~	~~182~~	174	8	316
9	Julio Santiago	Brazil	A	93.15	136	140	~~145~~	140	8	~~170~~	170	~~176~~	170	9	310
10	Fernando Reis	Brazil	A	93.80	135	~~140~~	140	140	10	~~164~~	164	~~170~~	164	10	304
