= Weightlifting at the 2007 Pan American Games – Men's 56 kg =

Weightlifting – Men's 56 kg at the 2007 Pan American Games
- Venue: Complexo Esportivo Riocentro
- Dates: 14 July 2007
- Competitors: 5 from 5 nations
- Winning total weight: 271 kg

Medalists
| Gold medal | Sergio Álvarez | Cuba |
| Silver medal | Marvin López | El Salvador |
| Bronze medal | Jaime Iturra | Chile |

The Men's 56 kg weightlifting event at the 2007 Pan American Games took place at the Complexo Esportivo Riocentro on 14 July 2007.

== Schedule ==
All times are Brasilia Time (UTC-3)

| Date | Time | Event |
|---|---|---|
| 14 July 2007 | 14:00 | Group A |

== Records ==
Prior to this competition, the existing world, Pan American and Games records were as follows:

| World record | Snatch | Halil Mutlu (TUR) | 138 kg | Antalya, Turkey | 4 November 2001 |
| World record | Clean & Jerk | Halil Mutlu (TUR) | 168 kg | Trenčín, Slovakia | 24 April 2001 |
| World record | Total | Halil Mutlu (TUR) | 305 kg | Sydney, Australia | 16 September 2000 |
| Pan American record | Snatch | William Vargas (CUB) | 130 kg | Pinar del Río, Cuba | 7 May 1998 |
| Pan American record | Clean & Jerk | Sergio Álvarez (CUB) | 157 kg | Holguín, Cuba | 4 September 2000 |
| Pan American record | Total | William Vargas (CUB) | 285 kg | Pinar del Río, Cuba | 7 May 1998 |
| Games record | Snatch | Nelson Castro (COL) | 117 kg | Santo Domingo, Dominican Republic | 12 August 2003 |
| Games record | Clean & Jerk | Sergio Álvarez (CUB) | 150 kg | Winnipeg, Canada | 23 July 1999 |
| Games record | Total | Sergio Álvarez (CUB) | 265 kg | Winnipeg, Canada | 23 July 1999 |

The following records were established during the competition:

| Snatch | 118 kg | Sergio Álvarez (CUB) | GR |
| Snatch | 120 kg | Sergio Álvarez (CUB) | GR |
| Clean & Jerk | 151 kg | Sergio Álvarez (CUB) | GR |
| Total | 271 kg | Sergio Álvarez (CUB) | GR |

== Results ==
| Rank | Athlete | Nation | Group | Body weight | Snatch (kg) | | | | | Clean & Jerk (kg) | | | | | Total |
| Rank | Athlete | Nation | Group | Body weight | 1 | 2 | 3 | Result | Rank | 1 | 2 | 3 | Result | Rank | Total |
|---|---|---|---|---|---|---|---|---|---|---|---|---|---|---|---|
| 1st place, gold medalist(s) | Sergio Álvarez | Cuba | A | 55.95 | 113 | 118 | 120 | 120 | 1 | 140 | 151 | – | 151 | 1 | 271 |
| 2nd place, silver medalist(s) | Marvin López | El Salvador | A | 55.35 | 105 | 108 | ~~109~~ | 108 | 3 | 135 | 138 | ~~141~~ | 138 | 2 | 246 |
| 3rd place, bronze medalist(s) | Jaime Iturra | Chile | A | 55.60 | 105 | 109 | 111 | 111 | 2 | ~~135~~ | ~~135~~ | 135 | 135 | 3 | 246 |
| 4 | Welinton Pec | Guatemala | A | 55.80 | 92 | 97 | ~~100~~ | 97 | 4 | 127 | 130 | 134 | 134 | 4 | 231 |
| – | Sergio Rada | Colombia | A | 55.55 | ~~110~~ | ~~110~~ | ~~110~~ | – | – | – | – | – | – | – | – |
