= Wrestling at the 2007 Pan American Games =

- Venue: Riocentro Complex
- Dates: July 14–18, 2007

Wrestling competitions at the 2007 Pan American Games in Rio de Janeiro was held from July 14 to July 18 at the Riocentro Complex.

== Medal table ==
* Host nation (Brazil)

| Rank | Nation | Gold | Silver | Bronze | Total |
|---|---|---|---|---|---|
| 1 | Cuba | 9 | 1 | 4 | 14 |
| 2 | United States | 6 | 7 | 4 | 17 |
| 3 | Canada | 2 | 1 | 6 | 9 |
| 4 | Colombia | 1 | 1 | 3 | 5 |
| 5 | Venezuela | 0 | 4 | 8 | 12 |
| 6 | Dominican Republic | 0 | 1 | 3 | 4 |
| 7 | Brazil* | 0 | 1 | 2 | 3 |
| 7 | Peru | 0 | 1 | 2 | 3 |
| 9 | El Salvador | 0 | 1 | 0 | 1 |
| 10 | Puerto Rico | 0 | 0 | 2 | 2 |
| 11 | Ecuador | 0 | 0 | 1 | 1 |
| 11 | Mexico | 0 | 0 | 1 | 1 |
| Totals (12 entries) | | 18 | 18 | 36 | 72 |

== Men's events ==
=== Men's Freestyle ===
| Event | Gold | Silver | Bronze |
|---|---|---|---|
| 55 kg | Henry Cejudo; United States | Andy Moreno; Cuba | Cristian Roberty; Venezuela |
| 55 kg | Henry Cejudo; United States | Andy Moreno; Cuba | Fredy Serrano; Colombia |
| 60 kg | Yandro Quintana; Cuba | Mike Zadick; United States | Tomas Solorzano; Venezuela |
| 60 kg | Yandro Quintana; Cuba | Mike Zadick; United States | Aldo Parimango; Peru |
| 66 kg | Geandry Garzon; Cuba | Edison Hurtado; Colombia | Doug Schwab; United States |
| 66 kg | Geandry Garzon; Cuba | Edison Hurtado; Colombia | Pedro Soto; Puerto Rico |
| 74 kg | Ivan Fundora; Cuba | Joe Heskett; United States | Wilson Medina; Colombia |
| 74 kg | Ivan Fundora; Cuba | Joe Heskett; United States | Matthew Gentry; Canada |
| 84 kg | Roozbeh Banihashemi; Canada | Andy Hrovat; United States | Roylandy Zuniga; Cuba |
| 84 kg | Roozbeh Banihashemi; Canada | Andy Hrovat; United States | Rodrigo Piedrahita; Colombia |
| 96 kg | Michel Batista; Cuba | Luis Vivenes; Venezuela | Daniel Cormier; United States |
| 96 kg | Michel Batista; Cuba | Luis Vivenes; Venezuela | Mike Neufeld; Canada |
| 120 kg | Alexis Rodriguez; Cuba | Tommy Rowlands; United States | Carlos Félix; Dominican Republic |
| 120 kg | Alexis Rodriguez; Cuba | Tommy Rowlands; United States | Arjan Bhullar; Canada |

=== Men's Greco-Roman ===
| Event | Gold | Silver | Bronze |
|---|---|---|---|
| 55 kg | Yagnier Hernández; Cuba | Jorge Cardozo; Venezuela | Angel Lema; Ecuador |
| 55 kg | Yagnier Hernández; Cuba | Jorge Cardozo; Venezuela | Jansel Ramírez; Dominican Republic |
| 60 kg | Roberto Monzon; Cuba | Lindsey Durlacher; United States | Luis Liendo; Venezuela |
| 60 kg | Roberto Monzon; Cuba | Lindsey Durlacher; United States | Mario Molina; Peru |
| 66 kg | Justin Lester; United States | Anyelo Mota; Dominican Republic | Carlos Ramirez (wrestler); Venezuela |
| 66 kg | Justin Lester; United States | Anyelo Mota; Dominican Republic | Alain Milian; Cuba |
| 74 kg | Odelis Herrero; Cuba | Sixto Barrera; Peru | Felipe Macedo; Brazil |
| 74 kg | Odelis Herrero; Cuba | Sixto Barrera; Peru | T.C. Dantzler; United States |
| 84 kg | Bradley Vering; United States | Eddy Bartolozzi; Venezuela | José Arias; Dominican Republic |
| 84 kg | Bradley Vering; United States | Eddy Bartolozzi; Venezuela | Yunior Estrada; Cuba |
| 96 kg | Justin Ruiz; United States | Luiz Fernandes; Brazil | Oscar Aguilar; Mexico |
| 96 kg | Justin Ruiz; United States | Luiz Fernandes; Brazil | Erwin Caraballo; Venezuela |
| 120 kg | Mijaín López; Cuba | Dremiel Byers; United States | Ari Taub; Canada |
| 120 kg | Mijaín López; Cuba | Dremiel Byers; United States | Rafael Barreno; Venezuela |

== Women's events ==
=== Women's Freestyle ===
| Event | Gold | Silver | Bronze |
|---|---|---|---|
| 48 kg | Carol Huynh; Canada | Ingrid Medrano; El Salvador | Stephanie Murata; United States |
| 48 kg | Carol Huynh; Canada | Ingrid Medrano; El Salvador | Mayelis Caripa; Venezuela |
| 55 kg | Jackeline Rentería; Colombia | Marcie Van Dusen; United States | Tonya Verbeek; Canada |
| 55 kg | Jackeline Rentería; Colombia | Marcie Van Dusen; United States | Marcia Andrade; Venezuela |
| 63 kg | Sara McMann; United States | Yoselin Rojas; Venezuela | Megan Dolan; Canada |
| 63 kg | Sara McMann; United States | Yoselin Rojas; Venezuela | Mabel Fonseca; Puerto Rico |
| 72 kg | Kristie Marano; United States | Ohenewa Akuffo; Canada | Rosângela Conceição; Brazil |
| 72 kg | Kristie Marano; United States | Ohenewa Akuffo; Canada | Lisset Echevarria; Cuba |
