= Weightlifting at the 2007 Pan American Games – Women's 69 kg =

Weightlifting – Women's 69 kg at the 2007 Pan American Games
- Venue: Complexo Esportivo Riocentro
- Dates: 17 July 2007
- Competitors: 9 from 8 nations
- Winning total weight: 235 kg

Medalists
Gold medal	Tulia Medina	Colombia
Silver medal	Cinthya Domínguez	Mexico
Bronze medal	Vanessa Nuñez	Venezuela

The Women's 69 kg weightlifting event at the 2007 Pan American Games took place at the Complexo Esportivo Riocentro on 17 July 2007.

== Schedule ==
All times are Brasilia Time (UTC-3)

Date	Time	Event
17 July 2007	14:00	Group A

== Records ==
Prior to this competition, the existing world, Pan American and Games records were as follows:

World record	Snatch	Oxana Slivenko (RUS)	123 kg	Santo Domingo, Dominican Republic	4 October 2006
World record	Clean & Jerk	Zarema Kasayeva (RUS)	157 kg	Doha, Qatar	13 November 2005
World record	Total	Liu Chunhong (CHN)	275 kg	Athens, Greece	19 August 2004
Pan American record	Snatch	Tulia Medina (COL)	112 kg	Vancouver, Canada	19 November 2003
Pan American record	Clean & Jerk				
Pan American record	Total				
Games record	Snatch	Tulia Medina (COL)	107 kg	Santo Domingo, Dominican Republic	16 August 2003
Games record	Clean & Jerk	Tulia Medina (COL)	130 kg	Santo Domingo, Dominican Republic	16 August 2003
Games record	Total	Tulia Medina (COL)	237 kg	Santo Domingo, Dominican Republic	16 August 2003

The following records were established during the competition:

Snatch	108 kg	Tulia Medina (COL)	GR

== Results ==
Rank	Athlete	Nation	Group	Body weight	Snatch (kg)					Clean & Jerk (kg)					Total
Rank	Athlete	Nation	Group	Body weight	1	2	3	Result	Rank	1	2	3	Result	Rank	Total
1st place, gold medalist(s)	Tulia Medina	Colombia	A	68.30	~~103~~	103	108	108	1	122	127	~~130~~	127	1	235
2nd place, silver medalist(s)	Cinthya Domínguez	Mexico	A	69.00	~~95~~	~~95~~	95	95	2	~~110~~	110	115	115	2	210
3rd place, bronze medalist(s)	Vanessa Nuñez	Venezuela	A	63.65	~~90~~	90	~~92~~	90	3	~~108~~	108	109	109	3	199
4	Jaqueline Ferreira	Brazil	A	63.90	85	~~90~~	90	90	4	100	105	109	109	4	199
5	Fabiana Santos	Brazil	A	67.50	83	~~88~~	88	88	6	~~107~~	~~107~~	107	107	5	195
6	Laura Ramsay	Trinidad and Tobago	A	68.70	76	81	84	84	7	92	~~95~~	96	96	7	180
7	Camila Beltran	Chile	A	67.10	~~80~~	~~80~~	80	80	8	97	~~101~~	~~101~~	101	6	177
8	Daymara Rovira	Cuba	A	67.75	70	~~75~~	~~75~~	70	9	88	92	95	95	8	165
–	Marie-Ève Beauchemin-Nadeau	Canada	A	68.55	83	87	90	90	5	~~105~~	~~108~~	~~108~~	–	–	–
