= Weightlifting at the 2007 Pan American Games – Women's 48 kg =

Weightlifting – Women's 48 kg at the 2007 Pan American Games
- Venue: Complexo Esportivo Riocentro
- Dates: 14 July 2007
- Competitors: 5 from 5 nations
- Winning total weight: 168 kg

Medalists
Gold medal	Carolina Valencia	Mexico
Silver medal	Betsi Rivas	Venezuela
Bronze medal	Guillermina Candelario	Dominican Republic

The Women's 48 kg weightlifting event at the 2007 Pan American Games took place at the Complexo Esportivo Riocentro on 14 July 2007.

== Schedule ==
All times are Brasilia Time (UTC-3)

Date	Time	Event
14 July 2007	16:00	Group A

== Records ==
Prior to this competition, the existing world, Pan American and Games records were as follows:

World record	Snatch	Yang Lian (CHN)	98 kg	Santo Domingo, Dominican Republic	1 October 2006
World record	Clean & Jerk	Chen Xiexia (CHN)	120 kg	Tai'an, China	21 April 2007
World record	Total	Yang Lian (CHN)	217 kg	Santo Domingo, Dominican Republic	1 October 2006
Pan American record	Snatch				
Pan American record	Clean & Jerk				
Pan American record	Total	Tara Nott (USA)	185 kg	New Orleans, United States	21 July 2000
Games record	Snatch	Tara Nott (USA)	77 kg	Winnipeg, Canada	23 July 1999
Games record	Clean & Jerk	Tara Nott (USA)	100 kg	Winnipeg, Canada	23 July 1999
Games record	Total	Tara Nott (USA)	177 kg	Winnipeg, Canada	23 July 1999

The following records were established during the competition:

Snatch	78 kg	Carolina Valencia (MEX)	GR

== Results ==
Rank	Athlete	Nation	Group	Body weight	Snatch (kg)					Clean & Jerk (kg)					Total
Rank	Athlete	Nation	Group	Body weight	1	2	3	Result	Rank	1	2	3	Result	Rank	Total
1st place, gold medalist(s)	Carolina Valencia	Mexico	A	47.65	73	~~78~~	78	78	1	90	~~95~~	~~97~~	90	2	168
2nd place, silver medalist(s)	Betsi Rivas	Venezuela	A	47.65	66	68	70	70	2	85	89	92	92	1	162
3rd place, bronze medalist(s)	Guillermina Candelario	Dominican Republic	A	47.25	~~66~~	~~66~~	66	66	4	82	89	~~96~~	89	3	155
–	Aline Campeiro	Brazil	A	47.65	~~67~~	67	70	70	3	~~80~~	–	–	–	–	–
–	Lorena Vargas	Chile	A	47.20	~~64~~	~~64~~	~~64~~	–	–	–	–	–	–	–	–
