= Swimming at the 2007 Pan American Games – Women's 50 metre freestyle =

The Women's 50m Freestyle event at the 2007 Pan American Games took place at the Maria Lenk Aquatic Park in Rio de Janeiro, Brazil, with the final being swum on July 18.

== Medalists ==
Gold	Arlene Semeco; Venezuela
Silver	Vanessa García; Puerto Rico
Bronze	Flávia Delaroli; Brazil

== Records ==
World Record	Inge de Bruijn (NED)	24.13	2000-09-22	(Australia) Sydney
Pan Am Record	Kara Lynn Joyce (USA)	25.24	2003-08-16	(Dominican Republic) Santo Domingo

== Results ==
Rank	Swimmer	Heats		Semifinals		Final
Rank	Swimmer	Time	Rank	Time	Rank	Time
1	Arlene Semeco (VEN)	25.40	2	25.14	1	25.22
2	Vanessa García (PUR)	25.82	6	25.69	4	25.46
3	Flávia Delaroli (BRA)	25.35	1	25.34	3	25.52
4	Maritza Correia (USA)	25.74	5	25.81	6	25.63
5	Samantha Woodward (USA)	25.56	3	25.74	5	25.79
6	Ximena Vilár (VEN)	26.85	15	26.56	8	26.40
7	Seanna Mitchell (CAN)	26.28	7	26.36	7	26.43
—	Rebeca Gusmão (BRA)	25.60	4	25.26	2	~~25.05~~
9	Sharntelle McLean (TRI)	26.64	11	26.57	9	
10	Elizabeth Collins (CAN)	26.77	15	26.73	10	
11	Alia Atkinson (JAM)	26.71	14	26.74	11	
12	Carolina Colorado (COL)	26.69	13	26.75	12	
13	Arianna Vanderpool-Wallace (BAH)	26.67	12	26.80	13	
14	Natasha Moodie (JAM)	26.85	16	26.85	14	
15	Liliana Ibáñez (MEX)	26.57	9	26.89	15	
16	Yamile Cabello (ECU)	26.61	10	26.99	16	
17	Nikia Deveaux (BAH)	27.15	17			
18	Sharon Fajardo (HON)	27.37	18			
19	Kiera Aitken (BER)	27.39	19			
20	Cherelle Thompson (TRI)	27.51	20			
21	Nilshaira Isenia (AHO)	27.67	21			
22	Nishani Cicilson (SUR)	27.74	22			
23	Elsa Pumar (URU)	28.40	23			
