= Weightlifting at the 2010 South American Games – Men's 77kg =

The Men's 77 kg event at the 2010 South American Games was held over March 28 at 14:00. Although there was a tie for first place, Yony Andica, from Colombia, won due to a lower bodyweight.

== Medalists ==
Gold	Silver	Bronze
Yony Andica; Colombia	Jose Ocando; Venezuela	Freddy Tenorio; Ecuador

== Results ==
Rank	Athlete	Bodyweight	Snatch			Clean & Jerk			Total
Rank	Athlete	Bodyweight	1	2	3	1	2	3	Total
1st place, gold medalist(s)	Yony Andica (COL)	75.18	140	144	146	183	185	~~188~~	331
2nd place, silver medalist(s)	Jose Ocando (VEN)	76.85	140	144	146	185	~~186~~	~~187~~	331
3rd place, bronze medalist(s)	Freddy Tenorio (ECU)	75.67	135	140	145	168	175	~~183~~	320
4	Sebastian Espeleta (ARG)	72.91	126	131	~~135~~	155	160	165	296
5	Andres Pennisi (ARG)	76.61	118	122	~~126~~	~~147~~	~~147~~	147	269
6	Mauricio de Marino (URU)	75.91	100	~~106~~	107	125	132	137	244
7	Marcelo Melgar (BOL)	75.00	102	107	~~110~~	115	~~120~~	~~120~~	222
8	Gustavo Abel Aquino (PAR)	74.67	76	79	86	104	107	~~111~~	193

== New Records ==
Clean & Jerk	183 kg	Yony Andica (COL)	GR
Clean & Jerk	185 kg	Jose Ocando (VEN)	GR
Total	331 kg	Jose Ocando (VEN)	GR
