= Swimming at the 2007 Pan American Games – Women's 100 metre freestyle =

The Women's 100m Freestyle event at the 2007 Pan American Games took place at the Maria Lenk Aquatic Park in Rio de Janeiro, Brazil, with the final being swum on July 22.

== Medalists ==
Gold	Arlene Semeco; Venezuela
Silver	Flávia Delaroli; Brazil
Bronze	Vanessa García; Puerto Rico

== Results ==
=== Final ===
Rank	Swimmer	Time
1	Arlene Semeco (VEN)	55.78
2	Flávia Delaroli (BRA)	55.84
3	Vanessa García (PUR)	56.61
4	Lauren Thies (USA)	56.67
5	Elizabeth Collins (CAN)	56.81
6	Seanna Mitchell (CAN)	57.04
7	Liliana Ibáñez (MEX)	57.33
—	Rebeca Gusmão (BRA)	~~55.17~~
