= 2007 Pan American Games opening ceremony =

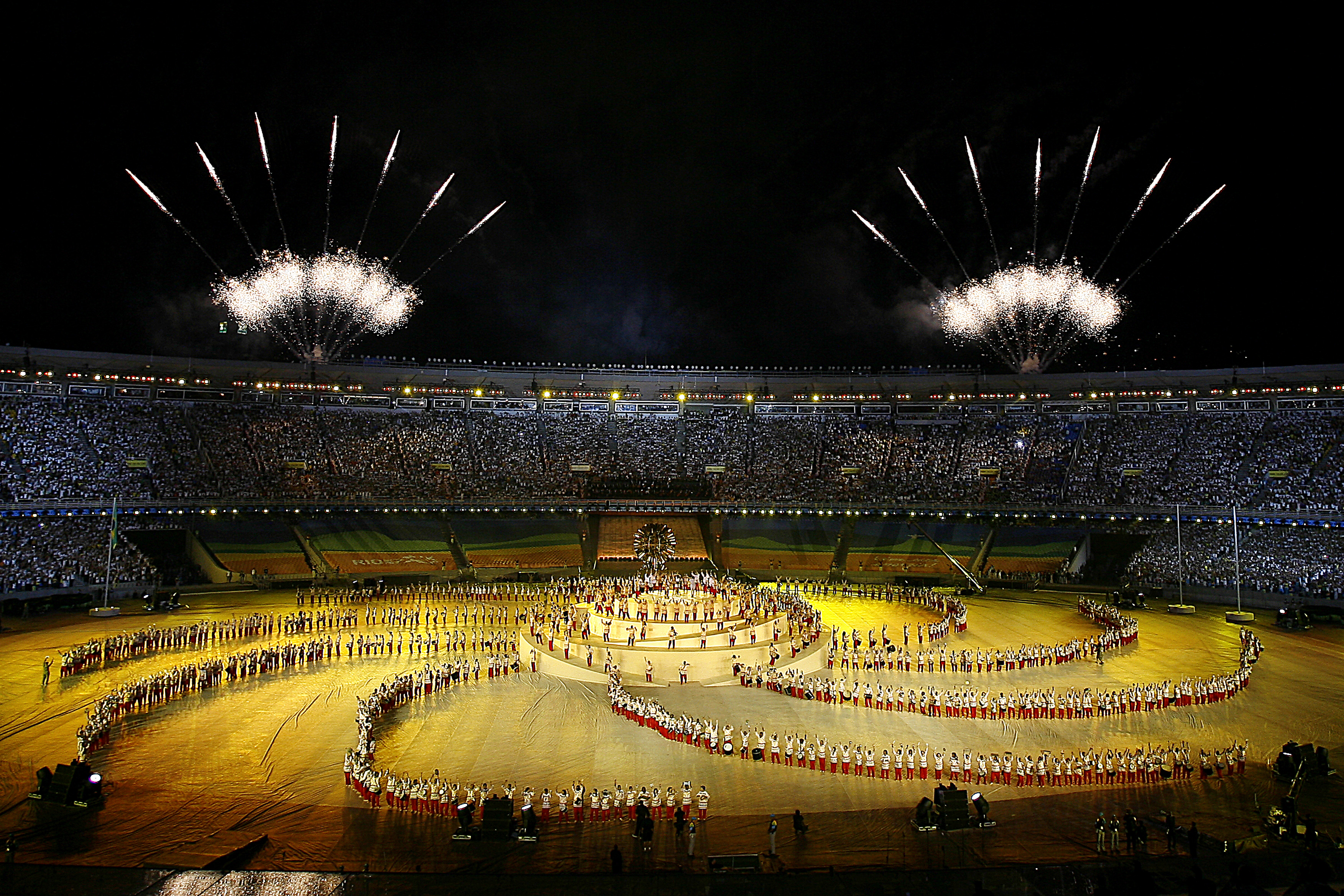
The Opening ceremony.

The Opening Ceremony of the XV Pan American Games took place on 13 July 2007. Considered an audition for the 2014 World Cup and 2016 Olympics, the Opening Ceremony was praised by the media for its creativity and Olympic-style production value. The Los Angeles Times reported:

Brazil's 2nd largest city still must overcome doubts about crime and traffic, among other things, if it hopes to make good on its quixotic bid to play host to the 2016 Olympic Games. But Rio sure has the opening ceremony down pat. On Friday the city inaugurated the 15th Pan American Games with a lavish and creative 3½ -hour show that featured a symphony orchestra, three 100-foot-long coral snakes, Miss Brazil, an alligator the size of a 747, fireworks, a 1,500-piece percussion band and thousands of dancers dressed as everything from ocean waves to water lilies.

Approximately 90,000 spectators and 5,000 athletes packed Rio de Janeiro's Maracanã Stadium for the occasion. The ceremony included a cast of 4,000 and a $17 million (US) budget. The Executive Producer of the Opening Ceremony was Scott Givens. More than 250 people were part of the creative and production teams with another 1,000 backstage volunteers. Scott Givens' team was responsible for the Opening Ceremony, Sports Production, the presentation of 2,252 medals, Sports Production and the Closing Ceremony.

The theme of the show was based on the theme of the Rio 2007 Games: Viva Essa Energia (Share this Energy).

== Proceedings ==
The show began at 17:30 local time (UTC-3) and lasted for two and a half hours.

The beginning had the Dragoons of Independence, the first regiment of the Brazilian army and the official guard of the Republic's president, bringing a Brazilian flag and an execution of the Brazilian national anthem sung by Elza Soares, the former wife of football player Mané Garrincha. The countdown, starting with the number 15, showed the cities which hosted the American event.

The first part was named "Viva essa energia" (Live this energy in Portuguese). And started with an afro-Brazilian boy named Cainan playing a tambour and guiding 1,150 rhythmists from the 17 Samba schools and presenting the official song of the XV Pan American Games, "Viva essa Energia", composed by Arnaldo Antunes, former singer the Brazilian rock band Titãs, and Liminha, singer the Brazilian rock band Os Mutantes, and sung by Ana Costa samba singer.

The parade of the athletes had a rhythm of a samba, chorinho and the bossa nova's rhythm played by the battery of samba schools which made a huge corridor when the athletes from the 42 nations passed between them. There was expectation about the entry of Panama's delegation due to interference by the Panamanian government on their national Olympic committee, the IOC have banned the participation of the country in official events but the PASO required the Panamanian athletes to participate using their organization's flag, so the IOC came back to the decision and authorised the participation of Panama.

At this games were created the PASO's anthem, composed by André Mehmari and performed by Orquestra Sinfônica Brasileira conducted by Roberto Minczuk.

The show were divided in three parts: "A energia do Sol" (The energy of sun), "A energia da água" (the energy of water), and "A energia do homem" (The man's energy). The show was coordinated by Rosa Magalhães from the Rio de Janeiro samba school GRES Imperatriz Leopoldinense.

The oath of the athletes was performed by Brazilian taekwondo athlete Natália Falavigna.

Contrary to plan and tradition, the games were not opened by Brazil's head of state, President Luiz Inácio Lula da Silva, but by the head of the Brazilian Olympic Committee, Carlos Arthur Nuzman. Prior to the official opening, Lula had been repeatedly booed whenever the in-stadium camera showed him on the large screen set up inside the stadium.

== Parade of Nations ==
Order	Nation	Spanish	Brazilian Portuguese	Flag bearer	Sport
1	Argentina	Argentina	Argentina	Luciana Aymar	Field hockey
2	Antigua and Barbuda	Antigua y Barbuda	Antígua e Barbuda	Jerry Williams	
3	Netherlands Antilles	Antillas Neerlandesas	Antilhas Neerlandesas	Rodion Davelaar	Swimming
4	Aruba	Aruba	Aruba	Charlene De Cuba	
5	Bahamas	Bahamas	Bahamas	Jeremy Knowles	Swimming
6	Barbados	Barbados	Barbados	Vera Angela Jones	
7	Belize	Belice	Belize	Alfonso Martínez	Taekwondo
8	Bermuda	Bermuda	Bermudas	Kiera Aitken	Swimming
9	Bolivia	Bolivia	Bolívia	Giovana Irusta	
10	Canada	Canadá	Canadá	Susan Nattrass	Shooting
11	Chile	Chile	Chile	Marco Arriagada	Cycling
12	Colombia	Colombia	Colômbia	Leydi Solís	
13	Costa Rica	Costa Rica	Costa Rica	Katherine Alvarado Araya	
14	Cuba	Cuba	Cuba	Driulis González	
15	Dominica	Dominica	Dominica	Hubert Joseph	
16	Ecuador	Ecuador	Equador	Seledina Nieve	
17	El Salvador	El Salvador	El Salvador	Eva María Dimas	
18	United States	Estados Unidos	Estados Unidos	Danielle Scott-Arruda	
19	Grenada	Granada	Granada	Jewel Lewis	
20	Guatemala	Guatemala	Guatemala	Kevin Cordón	
21	Guyana	Guyana	Guiana	Cleveland Forde	
22	Haiti	Haití	Haiti	Ange Marcie	
23	Honduras	Honduras	Honduras	Luis Alonso Morán	
24	Cayman Islands	Islas Caimán	Ilhas Cayman	Christopher Jackson	
25	Virgin Islands	Islas Vírgenes	Ilhas Virgens Americanas	Josh Laban	
26	British Virgin Islands	Islas Vírgenes Británicas	Ilhas Virgens Britânicas	Dean Greenaway	
27	Jamaica	Jamaica	Jamaica	Alia Atkinson	Swimming
28	Mexico	México	México	Iridia Salazar	
29	Nicaragua	Nicaragua	Nicarágua	Christian Villacencio	
30	Panama	Panamá	Panamá	Irving Saladino	
31	Paraguay	Paraguay	Paraguai	Fabiana Aluan	
32	Peru	Perú	Peru	Víctor Aspillaga	
33	Puerto Rico	Puerto Rico	Porto Rico	Henry Soto	
34	Dominican Republic	República Dominicana	República Dominicana	Yuderqui Contreras	
35	Saint Kitts and Nevis	San Cristóbal y Nieves	São Cristóvão e Névis	Roatter Johnson	
36	Saint Lucia	Santa Lucía	Santa Lúcia	Henry Bailey	
37	Saint Vincent and the Grenadines	San Vicente y las Granadinas	São Vicente e Granadinas	Wayne Williams	
38	Suriname	Surinam	Suriname	Chinyere Pigot	
39	Trinidad and Tobago	Trinidad y Tobago	Trinidad e Tobago	Kwadwane Brown	
40	Uruguay	Uruguay	Uruguai	Andrés Silva	
41	Venezuela	Venezuela	Venezuela	Silvio Fernández	
42	Brazil	Brasil	Brasil	Vanderlei Cordeiro de Lima	

== See also ==
- 2006 Asian Games opening ceremony
- 2008 Summer Olympics opening ceremony
- 2016 Summer Olympics opening ceremony
- 2016 Summer Olympics Parade of Nations
