= Octavio Mejías =

Venezuelan weightlifter (born 1982)

Personal information
- Born: July 21, 1982 (age 43)
Medal record
Pan American Games
Bronze medal – third place	2003 Santo Domingo	– 77 kg
Bronze medal – third place	2007 Rio de Janeiro	– 77 kg

Octavio Antonio Mejías Hernández (born July 21, 1982) is a Venezuelan weightlifter. His personal best is 342.5 kg.

He won the bronze medal at the 2007 Pan American Games in the 77 kg division. Fellow countryman José Ocando won silver.

At the 2004 Summer Olympics he ranked 12th in the men's 77kg weightlifting competition, lifting a total of 342.5 kg. He competed in Weightlifting at the 2008 Summer Olympics in the 77 kg division but did not finish.

He is 5 ft 3 inches tall and weighs 170 lb.

== Notes and references ==
- sports-reference
