= Karate at the 2007 Pan American Games =

This page shows the results of the Karate Competition for men and women at the 2007 Pan American Games, held from July 26 to July 27, 2007 in the Algodão Gymnasium located in the Miécimo da Silva Sports Complex in Rio de Janeiro, Brazil. The gymnasium has a capacity of 4,000 people.

== Men's competition ==
=== Kumite (– 60 kg) ===
RANK	NAME
Gold medal	Francisco Nievas (ARG)
Silver medal	Eynar Tamame (CUB)
Bronze medal	Douglas Brose (BRA)
Bronze medal	Norberto Sosa (DOM)

=== Kumite (– 65 kg) ===
RANK	NAME
Gold medal	Luis Plumacher (VEN)
Silver medal	Carlos Lourenço (BRA)
Bronze medal	Lucio Martínez (ARG)
Bronze medal	Aron Pérez (ESA)

=== Kumite (– 70 kg) ===
RANK	NAME
Gold medal	Saeed Baghbani (CAN)
Silver medal	Jean Carlos Peña (VEN)
Bronze medal	Alberto Mancebo (DOM)
Bronze medal	Vinicius Souza (BRA)

=== Kumite (– 75 kg) ===
RANK	NAME
Gold medal	Dionicio Gustavo (DOM)
Silver medal	Jorge Zaragoza (CUB)
Bronze medal	David Dubó (CHI)
Bronze medal	William Serrano (ESA)

=== Kumite (– 80 kg) ===
RANK	NAME
Gold medal	Diego Bórquez (CHI)
Silver medal	Gilberto Ocoro (COL)
Bronze medal	Philippe Poirier (CAN)
Bronze medal	Nelson Sardenberg (BRA)

=== Kumite (+ 80 kg) ===
RANK	NAME
Gold medal	Juarez Santos (BRA)
Silver medal	Mario Toro (VEN)
Bronze medal	Andrés Heredia (ECU)
Bronze medal	Juan Valdez (DOM)

== Women's competition ==
=== Kumite (– 53 kg) ===
RANK	NAME
Gold medal	Cheili González (GUA)
Silver medal	Valéria Kumizaki (BRA)
Bronze medal	Jennifer Guillette (CAN)
Bronze medal	Jessy Reyes (CHI)

=== Kumite (– 60 kg) ===
RANK	NAME
Gold medal	Heidy Rodríguez (DOM)
Silver medal	Bertha Gutiérrez (MEX)
Bronze medal	Carmen Arias (ECU)
Bronze medal	Susana Bojaico (PER)

=== Kumite (+ 60 kg) ===
RANK	NAME
Gold medal	Lucélia Ribeiro (BRA)
Silver medal	Ana Escandón (COL)
Bronze medal	Yoly Guillen (VEN)
Bronze medal	Yaneya Gutiérrez (CUB)

== Medal table ==
Place	Nation	Gold medal	Silver medal	Bronze medal	Total
1	Brazil	2	2	3	7
2	Dominican Republic	2	0	3	5
3	Venezuela	1	2	1	4
4	Canada	1	0	2	3
4	Chile	1	0	2	3
6	Argentina	1	0	1	2
7	Guatemala	1	0	0	1
8	Cuba	0	2	1	3
9	Colombia	0	2	0	2
10	Mexico	0	1	0	1
11	Ecuador	0	0	2	2
11	El Salvador	0	0	2	2
13	Peru	0	0	1	2
Total		9	9	18	36
