= Natalie Burgener =

American weightlifter (born 1983)

Personal information
- Full name: Natalie Woolfolk-Burgener
- Nationality: United States
- Born: Natalie Woolfolk; November 7, 1983 (age 42) Protection, Kansas, U.S.
- Height: 5 ft 3 in (1.60 m)
- Weight: 139 lb (63 kg)
- Spouse: Casey Burgener

Sport
- Sport: Weightlifting
- Event: 63 kg
- Club: Team Crossfit
- Coached by: Zygmunt Smalcerz (Poland); Kirk Woolfolk (father)
Medal record
Women's weightlifting
Representing United States
Pan American Games
Bronze medal – third place	2007 Rio de Janeiro	63 kg

Natalie Burgener (née Woolfolk, born November 7, 1983) is an American weightlifter. She is a multiple-time American record-holder, a four-time national weightlifting champion (2005–2008), and a resident athlete of the U.S. Olympic Training Center in Colorado Springs, Colorado. She also won a bronze medal for the 63 kg division at the 2007 Pan American Games in Rio de Janeiro, Brazil.

== Weightlifting career ==
Burgener started out her sporting career as a gymnast, until she was encouraged to take up weightlifting by her father Kirk Woolfolk, a strength and conditioning coach at the United States Naval Academy in Annapolis, Maryland. At the age of eighteen, Burgener moved from Maryland to Colorado Springs, Colorado, to work and train as a resident athlete at the U.S. Olympic Training Center (USOC), under her head coach Zygmunt Smalcerz, gold medalist for the flyweight division at the 1972 Summer Olympics in Munich, representing Poland. She also attended the University of Colorado, where she earned a bachelor's degree major in sports management.

At the span of her weightlifting career, Burgener had won four consecutive American weightlifting titles, and held a national record once in the 63 kg division. She was also named USA Weightlifting's Lifter of the Year in 2006 and in 2007, for her outstanding achievement and full commitment to the sport. Following her further successes in weightlifting, Burgener qualified as a member of the U.S. national team for the 2007 Pan American Games in Rio de Janeiro, Brazil, where she captured the bronze medal in the same division, with a total of 213 kg (98 in snatch and 115 in clean and jerk).

Burgener also dated fellow weightlifter Casey Burgener, a two-time super heavyweight champion at the Pan American Games. The two became engaged after competing for their respective classes at the 2007 World Weightlifting Championships in Bangkok, Thailand, when Casey proposed to her while on a sightseeing tour from the back of an elephant.

After winning national championships for three consecutive years, Burgener was named to the U.S. Olympic weightlifting team. Her future husband Casey, on the other hand, was expected to be the third and final male Olympic qualifier from the United States, but the national team decided to grant two slots for male weightlifters instead. Following her fiance's huge disappointment, Burgener qualified for the women's middleweight category (63 kg) at the 2008 Summer Olympics in Beijing, along with her teammate Carissa Gump. She placed twelfth in this event, by successfully lifting 97 kg in the single-motion snatch, and hoisting 114 kg in the two-part, shoulder-to-overhead clean and jerk, for a total of 211 kg.

Three months after the Olympics, Burgener married Casey at his family's home in California. She took a year off from the competition, and consequently, moved to San Diego, where she and her husband worked as assistant strength coaches at the University of San Diego. In 2010, Burgener returned to Colorado Springs, Colorado, and trained full-time at USOC, with the goal of medalling for the 2012 Summer Olympics in London.
