= Taekwondo at the 2007 Pan American Games =

Taekwondo at the 2007 Pan American Games was held in Rio de Janeiro, Brazil, from July 14 to July 17, 2007, at Pavilhão 4A of the Riocentro Sports Complex. There were a total number of eight medal events, four each for men and women.

== Medal summary ==
=== Men's events ===
| Event | Gold | Silver | Bronze |
|---|---|---|---|
| 58 kg | (Dominican Republic) Gabriel Mercedes (DOM) | (Brazil) Márcio Wenceslau (BRA) | (Cuba) Frank Díaz (CUB) (Guatemala) José Rosal (GUA) |
| 68 kg | (Brazil) Diogo Silva (BRA) | (Peru) Peter López (PER) | (Venezuela) Danny Miranda (VEN) (Dominican Republic) Yacomo García (DOM) |
| 80 kg | (Cuba) Ángel Matos (CUB) | (United States) James Moontasri (USA) | (Trinidad and Tobago) Chinedum Osuji (TRI) (Mexico) José Luis Ramírez (MEX) |
| +80 kg | (Cuba) Gerardo Ortiz (CUB) | (United States) Anthony Graf (USA) | (Argentina) Martín Sío (ARG) (Brazil) Leonardo Gomes (BRA) |

=== Women's events ===
| Event | Gold | Silver | Bronze |
|---|---|---|---|
| 49 kg | (Mexico) Alejandra Gaal (MEX) | (Dominican Republic) Yajaira Peguero (DOM) | (Canada) Ivett Gonda (CAN) (Puerto Rico) Zoraida Santiago (PUR) |
| 57 kg | (Mexico) Iridia Salazar (MEX) | (Canada) Shannon Condie (CAN) | (Cuba) Yaimara Rosario (CUB) (Argentina) Rocio Boudy (ARG) |
| 67 kg | (Canada) Karine Sergerie (CAN) | (Guatemala) Heidy Juarez (GUA) | (Puerto Rico) Asunción Ocasio (PUR) (Venezuela) Nohemar Lea (VEN) |
| +67 kg | (Mexico) María del Rosario Espinoza (MEX) | (Brazil) Natália Falavigna (BRA) | (Venezuela) Aura Paez (VEN) (Cuba) Mirna Hechavarria (CUB) |

== Medal table ==
| Rank | Country | Gold medal | Silver medal | Bronze medal | Total |
| 1 | Mexico | 3 | 0 | 1 | 4 |
| 2 | Cuba | 2 | 0 | 3 | 5 |
| 3 | Brazil | 1 | 2 | 1 | 4 |
| 4 | Canada | 1 | 1 | 1 | 3 |
| 4 | Dominican Republic | 1 | 1 | 1 | 3 |
| 6 | United States | 0 | 2 | 0 | 2 |
| 7 | Guatemala | 0 | 1 | 1 | 2 |
| 8 | Peru | 0 | 1 | 0 | 1 |
| 9 | Venezuela | 0 | 0 | 3 | 3 |
| 10 | Argentina | 0 | 0 | 2 | 2 |
| 10 | Puerto Rico | 0 | 0 | 2 | 2 |
| 12 | Trinidad and Tobago | 0 | 0 | 1 | 1 |
| Total | | 8 | 8 | 16 | 32 |

== Events ==
=== July 14 ===
==== Men's Flyweight -58 kg ====
Round of 16
Gregory Figueroa (PUR) | 1
Alfonso Martinez (BIZ) | 0
Jose Rosal (GUA) | 2
Mickael Bernal (PAN) | 1
Mayko Votta (URU) | 0
Mario Leal (VEN) | 4
Frank Diaz (CUB) | 2
Mauro Crismanich (ARG) | 0
Jocelyn Adison (CAN) | 0
Yulis Gabriel Mercedes (DOM) | 3

Quarterfinals
Marcio Ferreira (BRA) | 2
Gregory Figueroa (PUR) | 0
Jose Rosal (GUA) | 4
Mario Leal (VEN) | 3
Tim Thackrey (USA) | 1
Frank Diaz (CUB) | 2
Yulis Gabriel Mercedes (DOM) | 1
Oscar Salazar (MEX) | 1

Semifinals
Marcio Ferreira (BRA) | 5
Jose Rosal (GUA) | 1
Frank Diaz (CUB) | 2
Yulis Gabriel Mercedes (DOM) | 2

Finals
Marcio Ferreira (BRA) | 1
Yulis Gabriel Mercedes (DOM) | 1

==== Women's Flyweight -49 kg ====
Round of 16
Julissa Diez (PER) | 0
Alejandra Gaal (MEX) | 4
Laura Lopez (ARG) | 2
Valderine Ferreira (BRA) | 1
Ivett Gonda (CAN) | 2
Alejandra Mena (CHI) | 0
Yajaira Peguero (DOM) | 3
Charlotte Craig (USA) | 3
Daynellis Montejo (CUB) | 0
Gladys Mora (COL) | 0
Yolanda Castañeda (GUA) | DSQ
Lianne Muller (AHO) | DSQ

Quarterfinals
Dalia Contreras (VEN) | 1
Alejandra Gaal (MEX) | 4
Laura Lopez (ARG) | 2
Ivett Gonda (CAN) | 2
Yajaira Peguero (DOM) | 5
Gladys Mora (COL) | 3
No Contestant
Zoraida Santiago (PUR) | bye

Semifinals
Alejandra Gaal (MEX) | 3
Ivett Gonda (CAN) | 0
Yajaira Peguero (DOM) | 4
Zoraida Santiago (PUR) | 2

Final
Alejandra Gaal (MEX) | 7
Yajaira Peguero (DOM) | 0

=== July 15 ===
==== Men's Featherweight -68 kg ====
Round of 16
Josue Sandoval (ESA) | 1
Peter Lopez (PER) | 3
Danny Miranda (VEN) | 8
Ali Ghafour (CAN) | 1
Kristian Melendez (PUR) | 2
Gino Fernald (SUR) | 2
Gabriel Sagastume (GUA) | 7
Jesus Armendariz (USA) | 0
Bernard Lorde (BAR) | 4
Gessler Viera (CUB) | 6

Quarterfinals
Idulio Islas (MEX) | 5
Peter Lopez (PER) | 6
Danny Miranda (VEN) | 5
Kristian Melendez (PUR) | 0
Diogo Silva (BRA) | 3
Gabriel Sagastume (GUA) | 0
Gessler Viera (CUB) | 2
Yacomo García (DOM) | 4

Semifinals
Peter Lopez (PER) | 5
Danny Miranda (VEN) | 3
Diogo Silva (BRA) | 3
Yacomo García (DOM) | 0

Finals
Peter Lopez (PER) | 1
Diogo Silva (BRA) | 3

==== Women's Featherweight -57 kg ====
Round of 16
Yaimara Rosario (CUB) | 1
Meg Ridnell (NCA) | 1
Iridia Salazar (MEX) | 4
Dinanyiris Furcal (DOM) | 0
Aurora Roman (PUR) | 1
Rocio Boudy (ARG) | 2
Debora Nunes (BRA) | 3
Shannon Condie (CAN) | 3

Quarterfinals
Laura Vazquez (ESA) | 0
Yaimara Rosario (CUB) | 2
Iridia Salazar (MEX) | 2
Miladys Mariño (VEN) | 0
Euda Carias (GUA) | 1
Rocio Boudy (ARG) | 2
Shannon Condie (CAN) | 5
Danielle Holmquist (USA) | 0

Semifinals
Yaimara Rosario (CUB) | 1
Iridia Salazar (MEX) | 2
Rocio Boudy (ARG) | 0
Shannon Condie (CAN) | 4

Finals
Iridia Salazar (MEX) | 4
Shannon Condie (CAN) | 0

=== July 16 ===
==== Men's Welterweight -80 kg ====
Round of 16
Sébastien Michaud (CAN) | 1
José Luis Ramírez (MEX) | 2
David Rajjab (GUY) | 4
Duwal Asprilla (COL) | 1
Carlos Isidoro (BRA) | 1
Ángel Matos (CUB) | 6
Chinedum Osuji (TRI) | 4
Miguel Ferrera (HON) | 1
Richard Alcantara (DOM) | 8
Manuel Erazo (ECU) | 1
Jason Tuitt (ISV) | 0
James Moontasri (USA) | 7
Carlos Vásquez (VEN) | 5
Kenneth Edwards (JAM) | 0

Quarterfinals
Juan Sanchez (PUR) | 1
José Luis Ramírez (MEX) | 3
David Rajjab (GUY) | 1
Ángel Matos (CUB) | 4
Chinedum Osuji (TRI) | 5
Richard Alcantara (DOM) | 3
James Moontasri (USA) | 2
Carlos Vásquez (VEN) | 0

Semifinals
José Luis Ramírez (MEX) | 1
Ángel Matos (CUB) | 3
Chinedum Osuji (TRI) | 1
James Moontasri (USA) | 3

Final
Ángel Matos (CUB) | 7
James Moontasri (USA) | 0

==== Women's Welterweight -67 kg ====
Round of 16
Nohemar Leal (VEN) | 4
Luciana Isoldi (ARG) | 0
Katherine Alvarado (CRC) | 0
Asunción Ocasio (PUR) | 2
Karine Sergerie (CAN) | 4
Erica Ferreira (BRA) | 1

Quarterfinals
Deysy Montes de Oca (DOM) | 1
Nohemar Leal (VEN) | 3
Heidy Juarez (GUA) | 5
Dahiana Morel (PAR) | 3
Jade Lopez (USA) | 2
Asunción Ocasio (PUR) | 3
Karine Sergerie (CAN) | 1
Taimi Castellanos (CUB) | 0

Semifinals
Nohemar Leal (VEN) | 2
Heidy Juarez (GUA) | 3
Asunción Ocasio (PUR) | 0
Karine Sergerie (CAN) | 7

Finals
Heidy Juarez (GUA) | 2
Karine Sergerie (CAN) | 8

=== July 17 ===
==== Men's Heavyweight +80 kg ====
Round of 16
Martin Sio (ARG) | 3
Eric Ahn (CAN) | 2
Luis Noguera (VEN) | 1
Leonardo Santos (BRA) | 3
Anthony Graff (USA) | 3
Salvador Perez (MEX) | 0

Quarterfinals
Tudor Sanon (HAI) | 1
Martin Sio (ARG) | 2
Adrian Spellen (GUY) | 0
Gerardo Ortiz (CUB) | 1
Angel Roman (PUR) | 1
Leonardo Santos (BRA) | 3
Anthony Graff (USA) | 6
Kristopher Moitland (CRC) | 4

Semifinals
Martin Sio (ARG) | 0
Gerardo Ortiz (CUB) | 1
Leonardo Santos (BRA) | 1
Anthony Graff (USA) | 3

Finals
Gerardo Ortiz (CUB) | 1
Anthony Graff (USA) | 1

==== Women's Heavyweight +67 kg ====
Round of 16
Paula Wegscheider (ARG) | 1
Mirna Hechavarria (CUB) | 2
Alcira Ortiz (COL) | 0
Lorena Benites (ECU) | 3
Nancy Urraca (DOM) | 2
Lauren Cahoon (USA) | 3

Quarterfinals
Ineabelle Diaz (PUR) | 2
Mirna Hechevarria (CUB) | 2
María del Rosario Espinoza (MEX) | 1
Dasha Peregoudova (CAN) | 0
Aura Paez (VEN) | 3
Lorena Benites (ECU) | 0
Lauren Cahoon (USA) | -1
Natalia Falavigna (BRA) | 3

Semifinals
Mirna Hechevarria (CUB) | 0
María del Rosario Espinoza (MEX) | 2
Aura Paez (VEN) | 4
Natalia Falavigna (BRA) | 6

Finals
María del Rosario Espinoza (MEX) | 1
Natalia Falavigna (BRA) | 0

== Participating nations ==
A total of 108 taekwondo athletes from 30 countries competed at the 2007 Pan American Games:

- Argentina (6)
- Barbados (1)
- Belize (1)
- Brazil (8)
- Canada (8)
- Chile (1)
- Colombia (3)
- Costa Rica (2)
- Cuba (8)
- Dominican Republic (14)
- Ecuador (2)
- El Salvador (2)
- Guatemala (5)
- Guyana (2)
- Haiti (1)

- Honduras (1)
- Virgin Islands (1)
- Jamaica (1)
- Mexico (7)
- Netherlands Antilles (1)
- Nicaragua (1)
- Panama (1)
- Paraguay (1)
- Peru (2)
- Puerto Rico (9)
- Suriname (1)
- Trinidad and Tobago (1)
- Uruguay (1)
- United States (8)
- Venezuela (8)
