= Melanie Roach =

American weightlifter (born 1974)

Personal information
- Born: Melanie Kosoff; December 15, 1974 (age 51) The Dalles, Oregon
Medal record
Women's weightlifting
Representing United States
Pan American Games
Bronze medal – third place	2007 Rio de Janeiro	53 kg

Melanie Roach (née Kosoff; born December 15, 1974) is an Olympic weightlifter for the United States. She lives in Bonney Lake, Washington, where she owns Roach Gymnastics, Inc.

During high school, Melanie participated in gymnastics, but dislocated her shoulder. After reconstructive surgery, she slowly became interested in weightlifting. She started training in 1994 once meeting coach John Thrush at Calpian Weightlifting Club. By 1998 she was number one in the US, and set the world record, since bested, for the women's clean & jerk by lifting more than twice her weight, 113 kg/250 lbs. She is 5'2" and 117 lbs.

Three weeks before the US Olympic Trials in 2000, she herniated a disc in her back, and became an alternate. She then focused on starting a family with husband Dan Roach, who served as a Republican in the Washington House of Representatives from the 31st legislative district. Dan is the son of Pam Roach, served as a Washington State Senator from the same district. She then started training again in 2005, made it past the Olympic Trials, and into the 2008 Summer Olympics. There, she lifted 83 kg in the snatch, a new personal record, 110 kg in the clean & jerk, and a total of 193 kg, a new personal and American record. She placed 6th out of 9.

Roach is a member of the Church of Jesus Christ of Latter-Day Saints.

== Weightlifting achievements ==
- Gold Medalist in US Nationals (1998–2000, 2003, 2006–2008)
- Participant in World Weightlifting Championships (1998)
- 13th Place in World Weightlifting Championships (1999)
- 12th Place in World Weightlifting Championships (2006)
- 12th Place in World Weightlifting Championships (2007)
- Bronze Medalist in Pan Am Championships (2006)
- Bronze Medalist at the 2007 Pan American Games
- 6th Place in Olympic Games (2008)
