= Casey Burgener =

American weightlifter (born 1982)

Personal information
- Born: August 15, 1982 (age 43)
Medal record
Men's weightlifting
Representing the United States
Pan American Games
Silver medal – second place	2007 Rio de Janeiro	+ 105 kg
Pan American Championships
Gold medal – first place	2008 Callao	+ 105 kg

Casey Burgener (born August 15, 1982) is a weightlifter for the United States. His coaches are Mike Burgener and Paul Fleschler. He was born to Leslie Burgener, who lives in the San Diego area.

Burgener initially was to compete at the 2008 Summer Olympics, but the US unexpectedly lost one of three country slots when lifters from other countries were disqualified, which changed the results of a qualification event.

On April 13, 2012 Burgener was commissioned as an Ensign in the United States Navy. After serving for five years as a submariner, he is now a lieutenant in the United States Navy, and a training officer at the University of Michigan Naval ROTC unit, where he is charged with physically and mentally developing more than 80 young and proud midshipmen.

== Weightlifting achievements ==
- Casey Burgener is one of the strongest weightlifters in the USA and on December 8, 2002, he became the Junior American record holder of 165 kg snatch, 200 kg clean and jerk, and 365 kg total.
- At the 2004 Olympic Trials Casey broke the National record for the snatch in the 105 kg class with a 171 kg lift.
- Competed in four Junior and three Senior World Championships
- Silver in 2007 Pan American Games in +105 kg category.
- Gold in 2008 Pan American Championships in +105 kg category
