= María Cecilia Floriddia =

Argentine weightlifter (born 1980)

Personal information
- Born: 16 July 1980 (age 45)
Medal record
Women's Weightlifting
Representing Argentina
Pan American Games
| Bronze medal – third place | 2007 Rio de Janeiro | – 58 kg |

María Cecilia Floriddia (born 16 July 1980 in Rosario) is a female weightlifter from Argentina. She won the bronze medal at the 2007 Pan American Games for her native South American country in the – 58 kg weight division.
