= Peru at the 2007 Pan American Games =

- IOC code: PER
- NOC: Comité Olímpico Peruano
- Website: www.coperu.org

in Rio de Janeiro 13–29 July 2007
- Competitors: 93
- Flag bearer: Víctor Aspillaga
- Medals Ranked 20th: Gold 0 Silver 4 Bronze 8 Total 12

Pan American Games appearances (overview)
- 1951; 1955; 1959; 1963; 1967; 1971; 1975; 1979; 1983; 1987; 1991; 1995; 1999; 2003; 2007; 2011; 2015; 2019; 2023; 2027

The 15th Pan American Games were held in Rio de Janeiro, Brazil from 13 July to 29 July 2007.

== Medals ==
=== Silver ===
===== Sailing =====
- Men's Sunfish Class: Alexander Zimmermann

===== Taekwondo =====
- Men's – 68 kg: Peter López

===== Weightlifting =====
- Men's – 62 kg: Miñan Mogollon

===== Wrestling =====
- Men's Greco-Roman (– 74 kg): Sixto Barrera

=== Bronze ===
===== Badminton =====
- Men's Singles: Rodrigo Pacheco
- Women's Singles: Claudia Rivero
- Women's Doubles: Jie Meng Jin and Valeria Rivero
- Mixed Doubles: Rodrigo Pacheco and Claudia Rivero

===== Judo =====
- Men's – 100 kg: Carlos Zegarra

===== Karate =====
- Women's – 60 kg: Susana Bojaico

===== Wrestling =====
- Men's Freestyle (– 60 kg): Aldo Parimango
- Men's Greco-Roman (– 60 kg): Mario Molina

== See also ==
- Peru at the 2008 Summer Olympics
