= José Ocando =

Venezuelan weightlifter

Personal information
- Born: c.1986 (age 39–40)
Medal record
Men's Weightlifting
Representing Venezuela
Pan American Games
Silver medal – second place	2007 Rio de Janeiro	– 77 kg
Pan American Championships
Gold medal – first place	2008 Callao	– 77 kg

José Leonardo Ocando (born April 18, 1987 or March 17, 1986) is a Venezuelan weightlifter. His personal best is 342 kg.

He won the silver medal at the 2007 Pan American Games in the 77 kg division with a combined lift of 337 kg, 13 kg behind the winner Iván Cambar of Cuba. He said of his performance and lifting 145 kg in the snatch; "My goal was to win a medal and I gave my best to do so. For me the snatch was the most difficult part, but, gladly, I got a good score."

At the 2008 Pan American Championships he won the gold medal in the 77 kg category, with a total of 342 kg.

He competed in Weightlifting at the 2008 Summer Olympics in the 77 kg division finishing seventeenth with 322 kg.

He is 5 ft 5 inches tall and weighs 172 lb.
