= El Salvador at the 2007 Pan American Games =

- IOC code: ESA
- NOC: El Salvador Olympic Committee

in Rio de Janeiro 13–29 July 2007
- Competitors: 86
- Flag bearer: Eva María Dimas
- Medals Ranked 16th: Gold 1 Silver 3 Bronze 6 Total 10

Pan American Games appearances (overview)
- 1951; 1955; 1959; 1963; 1967; 1971; 1975; 1979; 1983; 1987; 1991; 1995; 1999; 2003; 2007; 2011; 2015; 2019; 2023

The 15th Pan American Games were held in Rio de Janeiro, Brazil from 13 July 2007 to 29 July 2007.

== Medals ==
=== Gold ===
===== Athletics =====
- Women's 20 km Road Walk: Cristina López

=== Silver ===
===== Weightlifting =====
- Men's – 56 kg: Marvin López

===== Wrestling =====
- Women's Freestyle 48 kg: Ingrid Medrano

===== Shooting =====
- Women's 10 metre air pistol: Luisa Maida

=== Bronze ===
===== Judo =====
- Men's Judo Half-middleweight (81 kg): Franklin Cisneros

===== Karate =====
- Men's wrestling (– 65 kg): Aron Pérez
- Men's wrestling (– 69 kg): William Serrano

===== Rowing =====
- Women's Single Sculls: Camila Vargas

===== Weightlifting =====
- Women's – 75 kg: Eva María Dimas

===== Shooting =====
- Women's 25 metre air pistol: Luisa Maida

== Results by event ==
=== Triathlon ===
==== Men's Competition ====
- William serrano
  - 1:57:44.19 &mdash

== See also ==
- El Salvador at the 2008 Summer Olympics
