= Puerto Rico at the 2007 Pan American Games =

- IOC code: PUR
- NOC: Puerto Rico Olympic Committee

in Rio de Janeiro 13–29 July 2007
- Competitors: 209
- Flag bearer: Henry Soto
- Medals Ranked 12th: Gold 3 Silver 6 Bronze 12 Total 21

Pan American Games appearances (overview)
- 1951; 1955; 1959; 1963; 1967; 1971; 1975; 1979; 1983; 1987; 1991; 1995; 1999; 2003; 2007; 2011; 2015; 2019; 2023; 2027

The 15th Pan American Games were held in Rio de Janeiro, Brazil from 13 July to 29 July 2007.

== Medals ==
=== Gold ===
===== Boxing =====
- Men's Flyweight (– 51 kg): McWilliams Arroyo

===== Gymnastics =====
- Men's Team Competition: Rafael Morales, Reinaldo Oquendo, Tommy Ramos, Luis Rivera, Alexander Colón, and Luis Velázquez
- Men's Pommel Horse: Luis Rivera

=== Silver ===
===== Basketball =====
- Men's Team Competition: Puerto Rico national basketball team

===== Bowling =====
- Women's Doubles: Michelle Ayala and Yoselin León

===== Boxing =====
- Men's Featherweight (– 57 kg): Abner Cotto
- Men's Light Welterweight (– 64 kg): Jonathan González

===== Shooting =====
- Women's Trap: Deborah Feliciano

===== Swimming =====
- Women's 50m Freestyle: Vanessa García

=== Bronze ===
===== Boxing =====
- Men's Light Flyweight (– 48 kg): Carlos Ortíz
- Men's Lightweight (– 60 kg): José Pedraza

===== Gymnastics =====
- Men's Parallel Bars: Luis Velázquez
- Men's Pommel Horse: Alexander Colón
- Men's Vault: Luis Rivera

===== Sailing =====
- Mixed Hobie Cat 16: Enrique Figueroa and Carla Malatrasi

===== Shooting =====
- Men's Double Trap: Lucas Bennazar

===== Swimming =====
- Women's 100m Freestyle: Vanessa García

===== Taekwondo =====
- Women's Flyweight (– 49 kg): Zoraida Santiago Gaston
- Women's Middleweight (– 67 kg): Asunción Ocasio

===== Wrestling =====
- Men's Freestyle (– 66 kg): Pedro Soto
- Women's Freestyle (– 63 kg): Mabel Fonseca

== Results by event ==
=== Basketball ===
==== Men's team competition ====
- Team roster

- Peter John Ramos
- José Juan Barea
- Ansel Guzmán
- Miguel Berdiel
- Joel Martin Jones
- Alejandro Carmona
- Gabriel Colon
- Ricardo Sanchez
- Angelo Reyes
- Héctor Velenzuela
- Carmelo Lee
- Manuel Narvaez

- Head coach: Manuel Cintron Vega

=== Triathlon ===
==== Men's Competition ====
- Edgardo Vélez Rivera

- 2:00:03.05 — 25th place

==== Women's Competition ====
- Melissa Ríos la Luz

- 2:09:01.49 — 21st place

== See also ==
- Puerto Rico at the 2006 Central American and Caribbean Games
- Puerto Rico at the 2008 Summer Olympics
- Puerto Rico at the 2010 Central American and Caribbean Games
