= Dominican Republic at the 2007 Pan American Games =

- IOC code: DOM
- NOC: Comité Olímpico Dominicano
- Website: www.colimdo.org

in Rio de Janeiro 13–29 July 2007
- Competitors: 171 in 21 sports
- Flag bearer: Yudelquis Contreras
- Medals Ranked 9th: Gold 6 Silver 6 Bronze 17 Total 29

Pan American Games appearances (overview)
- 1951; 1955; 1959; 1963; 1967; 1971; 1975; 1979; 1983; 1987; 1991; 1995; 1999; 2003; 2007; 2011; 2015; 2019; 2023

The 15th Pan American Games were held in Rio de Janeiro, Brazil from 13 July 2007 to 29 July 2007.

== Medals ==
=== Gold ===
===== Cycling =====
- Men's Individual Road Race: Wendy Cruz

===== Karate =====
- Men's Kumite (– 75 kg): Dionicio Gustavo
- Women's Kumite (– 60 kg): Heidy Rodríguez

===== Table tennis =====
- Men's Singles: Lin Ju

===== Taekwondo =====
- Men's – 58 kg: Gabriel Mercedes

===== Weightlifting =====
- Women's – 53 kg: Yudelquis Contreras

=== Silver ===
===== Boxing =====
- Men's Flyweight (– 51 kg): Juan Carlos Payano
- Men's Bantamweight (– 54 kg): Claudio Marrero
- Men's Middleweight (– 54 kg): Argenis Núñez

===== Table tennis =====
- Women's Singles: Wu Xue

===== Taekwondo =====
- Women's – 49 kg: Yajaira Peguero

===== Wrestling =====
- Men's Greco Roman (– 66 kg): Anyelo Mota

=== Bronze ===
===== Athletics =====
- Men's 4x400 metres: Carlos Santa, Arismendy Peguero, Yoel Tapia, and Félix Sánchez

===== Bowling =====
- Men's Doubles: Rolando Sebelen and Víctor Richards
- Women's Singles: Aumi Guerra

===== Boxing =====
- Men's Light Flyweight (– 48 kg): Wilton Méndez

===== Equestrian =====
- Individual Dressage: Yvonne Losos de Muñiz

===== Judo =====
- Men's – 100 kg: Teófilo Diek
- Women's – 52 kg: María García

===== Karate =====
- Men's Kumite (– 60 kg): Norberto Sosa
- Men's Kumite (– 70 kg): Alberto Mancebo
- Men's Kumite (+ 80 kg): Juan Valdez

===== Table tennis =====
- Women's Team: Johenny Valdez, Wu Xue and Lian Qian

===== Taekwondo =====
- Men's – 68 kg: Yacomo García Fernández

===== Weightlifting =====
- Women's – 48 kg: Guillermina Candelario
- Women's – 75 kg: Yinelis Burgos

===== Wrestling =====
- Men's Freestyle (– 120 kg): Carlos Félix
- Men's Greco-Roman (– 55 kg): Jansel Ramírez
- Men's Greco-Roman (– 84 kg): José Arias

== Results by event ==
=== Triathlon ===
==== Men's Competition ====
- Javier Cuevas
  - 1:54:49.39 — 12th place
- Yean Jiménez
  - 1:55:52.82 — 16th place
- Héctor Hernández
  - 2:03:43.52 — 27th place

== See also ==
- Dominican Republic at the 2008 Summer Olympics
