= Cuba at the 2007 Pan American Games =

- IOC code: CUB
- NOC: Cuban Olympic Committee

in Rio de Janeiro 13–29 July 2007
- Competitors: 470
- Flag bearer: Driulis González
- Medals Ranked 2nd: Gold 59 Silver 35 Bronze 41 Total 135

Pan American Games appearances (overview)
- 1951; 1955; 1959; 1963; 1967; 1971; 1975; 1979; 1983; 1987; 1991; 1995; 1999; 2003; 2007; 2011; 2015; 2019; 2023

The 15th Pan American Games were held in Rio de Janeiro, Brazil from 13 July 2007 to 29 July 2007.

== Medals ==
=== Gold ===
===== Archery =====
- Men's Individual Competition: Adrian Puentes

===== Athletics =====
- Men's 800 metres: Yeimer López
- Men's 110m Hurdles: Dayron Robles
- Men's High Jump: Víctor Moya
- Men's Javelin: Guillermo Martínez
- Women's 200 metres: Roxana Díaz
- Women's Marathon: Mariela González
- Women's 4 × 400 m Relay: Aymée Martínez, Daimy Pernia, Zulia Calatayud, and Indira Terrero
- Women's Triple Jump: Yargelis Savigne
- Women's Shot Put: Misleydis González
- Women's Discus: Yarelis Barrios
- Women's Hammer: Yipsi Moreno
- Women's Javelin: Osleidys Menéndez

===== Baseball =====
- Men's Team Competition: Cuba national baseball team

===== Boxing =====
- Men's Featherweight (– 57 kg): Idel Torriente
- Men's Lightweight (– 60 kg): Yordenis Ugás
- Men's Middleweight (– 75 kg): Emilio Correa
- Men's Heavyweight (– 91 kg): Osmay Acosta
- Men's Super Heavyweight (+ 91 kg): Robert Alfonso

===== Diving =====
- Men's 10m Platform: José Guerra

===== Fencing =====
- Men's Team Épée: Camilo Boris, Andrés Carrilo, David Castillo, and Guillermo Madrigal
- Women's Sabre: Mailyn González
- Women's Team Sabre: Misleydis Compañy, Ana Faez, Mailyn González, and Jennifer Morales

===== Rowing =====
- Men's Double Sculls: Yoennis Hernández and Janier Concepción
- Men's Quadruple Sculls: Yuleydis Cascaret, Janier Concepción, Ángel Fournier, and Yoennis Hernández
- Men's Lightweight Double Sculls: Eyder Batista and Yunior Pérez
- Women's Single Sculls: Mayra González
- Women's Lightweight Double Sculls: Yaima Velázquez and Ismaray Marerro

===== Taekwondo =====
- Men's Middleweight (– 80 kg): Ángel Matos
- Men's Heavyweight (+ 80 kg): Gerardo Ortiz

===== Volleyball =====
- Women's Team Competition: Cuba women's national volleyball team

===== Weightlifting =====
- Men's – 56 kg: Sergio Álvarez
- Men's – 69 kg: Yordanis Borrero
- Men's – 77 kg: Iván Cambar
- Men's – 94 kg: Yoandry Hernández
- Men's – 105 kg: Joel MacKenzie

=== Silver ===
===== Archery =====
- Men's Individual Competition: Juan Carlos Stevens

===== Athletics =====
- Men's Long Jump: Wilfredo Martínez
- Men's Triple Jump: Osniel Tosca
- Men's Decathlon: Yordanis García
- Women's Shot Put: Yumileidi Cumbá
- Women's Discus: Yania Ferrales
- Women's Hammer: Arasay Thondike
- Women's Javelin: Sonia Bisset
- Women's Heptathlon: Gretchen Quintana

===== Boxing =====
- Men's Light-Heavyweight (– 81 kg): Yusiel Nápoles

===== Diving =====
- Men's 3m Springboard Synchronized: Erick Fornaris and Jorge Betancourt
- Men's 10m Platform Synchronized: Erick Fornaris and José Guerra

===== Fencing =====
- Men's Épée: Andrés Carrilo

===== Handball =====
- Women's Team Competition: Cuba women's national handball team

===== Karate =====
- Men's Kumite (– 60 kg): Eynar Tamame
- Men's Kumite (– 75 kg): Jorge Zaragoza

===== Modern Pentathlon =====
- Men's Individual Competition: Yaniel Velazquez

===== Rowing =====
- Men's Single Sculls: Yoennis Hernández

===== Weightlifting =====
- Men's – 85 kg: Jadier Valladares

=== Bronze ===
===== Athletics =====
- Men's 3.000m Steeplechase: José Alberto Sánchez
- Men's 110m Hurdles: Yoel Hernández
- Men's Triple Jump: Yoandri Betanzos
- Men's Shot Put: Carlos Véliz
- Women's 400 metres: Indira Terrero
- Women's 800 metres: Zulia Calatayud
- Women's 4 × 100 m Relay: Virgen Benavides, Roxana Díaz, Misleidys Lazo and Anay Tejeda
- Women's Pole Vault: Yarisley Garcia
- Women's Long Jump: Yargelis Savigne
- Women's Triple Jump: Mabel Gay

===== Basketball =====
- Women's Team Competition: Cuba women's national basketball team

===== Boxing =====
- Men's Flyweight (– 51 kg): Yoandri Salinas
- Men's Light-Welterweight (– 64 kg): Innocente Fiss

===== Fencing =====
- Women's Foil: Misleydis Compañy
- Women's Team Foil: Misleydis Compañy, Eimey Gómez, Annis Hechavarria, and Adriagne Rivot

===== Handball =====
- Men's Team Competition: Cuba men's national handball team

===== Karate =====
- Women's Kumite (+ 60 kg): Yaneya Gutiérrez

===== Rowing =====
- Men's Lightweight Coxless Fours: Eyder Batista, Dixan Massip, Iran González, and Yunior Pérez
- Women's Double Sculls: Yursleydis Venet and Mayra González

===== Taekwondo =====
- Men's Flyweight (– 58 kg): Frank Díaz
- Women's Lightweight (– 57 kg): Yaimara Rosario
- Women's Heavyweight (+ 67 kg): Mirna Hechavarria

===== Volleyball =====
- Men's Team Competition: Cuba men's national volleyball team

===== Water polo =====
- Women's Team Competition: Cuba women's national water polo team

== Results by event ==
=== Basketball ===
==== Women's team competition ====
- Preliminary round (group B)
  - Defeated Argentina (81-79)
  - Defeated Colombia (81-53)
  - Lost to United States (63-78)
- Semifinal
  - Lost to Brazil (60-79)
- Bronze Medal Match
  - Defeated Canada (62-49) → Bronze Medal
- Team Roster
  - Yamara Amargo
  - Suchitel Avila
  - Yaima Boulet
  - Cariola Echevarría
  - Oyanaisis Gelis
  - Yamilé Martínez
  - Clenia Noblet
  - Leidys Oquendo
  - Yaquelín Plutín
  - Arlenys Romero
  - Yolyseny Soria
  - Taimara Suero
- Head coach: Alberto Zabala

=== Triathlon ===
==== Men's Competition ====
- Michel González
  - 1:53:34.57 — 7th place
- Carlos Rodríguez
  - 1:56:08.08 — 17th place
- Ramon Alberich
  - 1:57:05.07 — 22nd place

==== Women's Competition ====
- Yanitza Pérez
  - 2:03:49.24 — 13th place
- Venus Rodríguez
  - 2:05:28.44 — 17th place
- Maydelen Justo
  - 2:11:21.32 — 23rd place

=== Volleyball ===
==== Men's team competition ====
- Team Roster
  - Jorge Sánchez Salgado
  - Tornakeibel Gutierrez
  - Pavel Pimienta (c)
  - Michael Sánchez
  - Rolando Jurquin
  - Pedro Iznaga
  - Robertlandy Simón
  - Raydel Hierrezuelo
  - Oriol Camejo
  - Raydel Corrales
  - Odelvis Dominico
  - Yoandri Díaz
- Head coach: Orlando Samuel

==== Women's team competition ====
- Team Roster
  - Yumilka Ruíz
  - Yanelis Santos
  - Nancy Carrillo
  - Yenisey González
  - Daimí Ramírez
  - Yaima Ortíz
  - Yusleinis Herrera
  - Liana Mesa Luaces
  - Rosir Calderón
  - Kenia Carcaces
  - Yusidey Silié
  - Zoila Barros
- Head coach: Antonio Perdomo

== See also ==
- Cuba at the 2008 Summer Olympics
