= Weightlifting at the Pan American Games =

- No. of events: 14 (men: 7; women: 7)

Weightlifting has been a sport of the Pan American Games since the 1951 games. Women's took place at 1999 edition.

Like the Olympic Games, Clean and press was performed along with Snatch and Cleand and Jerk. Since Clean and Press was eliminated for weightlifting program in 1972, the 1975 Pan American Games were the first held with the present format.

== Medal table ==
Updated after the 2023 Pan American Games.

Rank	Nation	Gold	Silver	Bronze	Total
1	Cuba	161	56	16	233
2	United States	81	74	55	210
3	Colombia	38	42	38	118
4	Canada	18	22	40	80
5	Venezuela	15	37	34	86
6	Ecuador	10	7	12	29
7	Dominican Republic	7	14	36	57
8	Mexico	5	14	26	45
9	Puerto Rico	3	10	12	25
10	Brazil	3	5	16	24
11	Panama	2	10	13	25
12	Chile	2	4	4	10
13	Argentina	1	19	9	29
14	Netherlands Antilles	1	7	5	13
15	Trinidad and Tobago	1	4	4	9
16	Guyana	1	0	2	3
17	Jamaica	0	4	5	9
18	Nicaragua	0	2	4	6
19	El Salvador	0	2	3	5
20	Barbados	0	2	1	3
20	Guatemala	0	2	1	3
22	Peru	0	1	3	4
23	British West Indies	0	1	2	3
24	Haiti	0	1	1	2
25	Uruguay	0	1	0	1
26	Honduras	0	0	2	2
Totals (26 entries)		349	341	344	1,034

== See also ==
- Pan American Weightlifting Championships
