= Venezuela at the 2007 Pan American Games =

- IOC code: VEN
- NOC: Venezuelan Olympic Committee
- Website: www.cov.com.ve

in Rio de Janeiro 13–29 July 2007
- Competitors: 382
- Flag bearer: Silvio Fernández
- Medals Ranked 7th: Gold 12 Silver 23 Bronze 35 Total 70

Pan American Games appearances (overview)
- 1951; 1955; 1959; 1963; 1967; 1971; 1975; 1979; 1983; 1987; 1991; 1995; 1999; 2003; 2007; 2011; 2015; 2019; 2023

The 15th Pan American Games were held in Rio de Janeiro, Brazil, between 13 July 2007 and 29 July 2007.

== Medals ==
=== Gold ===
===== Cycling =====
- Men's Points Race: Andris Hernández

===== Fencing =====
- Men's Épée Individual: Rubén Limardo
- Women's Foil Individual: Mariana González
- Women's Foil Team: Jhohanna Fuenmayor, Mariana González, María Martínez and Yulitza Suárez

===== Gymnastics =====
- Men's Individual All-Around: José Luis Fuentes
- Women's Rings: Regulo Carmona

===== Karate =====
- Men's Kumite (– 65 kg): Luis Plumacher

===== Sailing =====
- Men's Sunfish Class: Eduardo Cordeiro

===== Swimming =====
- Women's 50m Freestyle: Arlene Semeco
- Women's 100m Freestyle: Arlene Semeco

===== Tennis =====
- Women's Singles: Milagros Sequera

=== Silver ===
===== Boxing =====
- Men's Light-Flyweight (– 48 kg): Kevin Betancourt
- Men's Heavyweight (– 91 kg): José Payares

===== Cycling =====
- Men's Team Sprint: Hersony Canelón, Andris Hernández, and César Marcano
- Men's Individual Sprint: Tomás Gil
- Men's BMX: Jonathan Suárez

===== Gymnastics =====
- Men's Pommel Horse: José Luis Fuentes

===== Karate =====
- Men's Kumite (– 70 kg): Jean Carlos Peña
- Men's Kumite (+ 80 kg): Mario Toro

===== Swimming =====
- Men's 1500m Freestyle: Ricardo Monasterio

=== Bronze ===
===== Cycling =====
- Women's Individual Road Race: Danielys García
- Men's Team Pursuit: Tomás Gil, Richard Ochoa, Jaime Rivas, and Franklin Chacón
- Men's Madison: Richard Ochoa and Andris Hernández
- Men's BMX: José Primera
- Women's BMX: Kimmy Diquez

===== Karate =====
- Women's Kumite (+ 60 kg): Yoly Guillen

===== Swimming =====
- Men's 100m Butterfly: Albert Subirats
- Men's 4 × 100 m Freestyle: Albert Subirats, Octavio Alesi, Luis Rojas, and Crox Acuña

===== Taekwondo =====
- Men's – 68 kg: Danny Miranda

== Results by event ==
=== Triathlon ===
==== Men's Competition ====
- José Vivas

- 1:55:31.71 — 14th place

- Gilberto González

- 1:58:23.05 — 24th place

- Camilo González

- 2:00:42.09 — 26th place

==== Women's Competition ====
- Rosemary López

- 2:07:47.64 — 20th place

== See also ==
- Venezuela at the 2008 Summer Olympics
