= 2009 South American U-20 Championship squads =

Below are the rosters for the 2009 South American Youth Championship tournament in Venezuela.

Players name marked in bold have been capped at full international level.

== Argentina ==
Coach: Sergio Batista (Argentina)

No.	Pos.	Player	Date of birth (age)	Caps	Goals	Club
1	GK	Luis Ojeda	March 21, 1990 (aged 18)	1	0	(Argentine Football Association) Unión de Santa Fe
2	DF	Fernando Tobio	October 18, 1989 (aged 19)	1	0	(Argentine Football Association) Vélez Sársfield
3	DF	**Emiliano Insúa**	January 7, 1989 (aged 20)	16	0	(The Football Association) Liverpool
4	DF	Fernando Meza	March 21, 1990 (aged 18)	1	0	(Argentine Football Association) San Lorenzo
5	MF	Exequiel Benavídez	March 5, 1989 (aged 19)	1	0	(Argentine Football Association) Boca Juniors
6	DF	**Federico Fernández**	February 21, 1989 (aged 19)	0	0	(Argentine Football Association) Estudiantes La Plata
7	MF	**Eduardo Salvio**	May 13, 1990 (aged 18)	1	1	(Argentine Football Association) Lanús
8	MF	**Franco Zuculini**	September 5, 1990 (aged 18)	0	0	(Argentine Football Association) Racing Club
9	FW	Juan Neira	February 21, 1989 (aged 19)	1	0	(Argentine Football Association) Gimnasia La Plata
10	MF	Damián Lizio	June 30, 1989 (aged 19)	0	0	(Argentine Football Association) River Plate
11	FW	**Jonathan Cristaldo**	March 5, 1989 (aged 19)	1	0	(Argentine Football Association) Vélez Sársfield
12	GK	Diego Rodríguez	June 25, 1989 (aged 19)	0	0	(Argentine Football Association) Independiente
13	DF	Julián Fernández	July 18, 1989 (aged 19)	1	0	(Argentine Football Association) Atlético Rafaela
14	DF	Maximiliano Oliva	March 24, 1990 (aged 18)	0	0	(Argentine Football Association) Tigre
15	FW	Andrés Ríos	August 1, 1989 (aged 19)	1	0	(Argentine Football Association) River Plate
16	MF	Marcelo Benítez	May 29, 1989 (aged 19)	1	0	(Argentine Football Association) Lanús
17	MF	Cristian Gaitán	January 15, 1990 (aged 19)	0	0	(Argentine Football Association) Estudiantes La Plata
18	MF	Leandro Velázquez	May 10, 1989 (aged 19)	1	0	(Argentine Football Association) Vélez Sársfield
19	MF	Iván Bella	September 13, 1989 (aged 19)	1	0	(Argentine Football Association) Vélez Sársfield
20	FW	Andrés Romero	December 21, 1989 (aged 19)	1	0	(Argentine Football Association) Argentinos Juniors

== Bolivia ==
Coach: Óscar Villegas (Bolivia)

No.	Pos.	Player	Date of birth (age)	Caps	Goals	Club
1	GK	Alex Arancibia	January 28, 1990 (aged 18)			(Bolivian Football Federation) Oriente Petrolero
2	DF	Jorge Toco	January 13, 1992 (aged 17)			(Bolivian Football Federation) Universitario de Sucre
3	DF	Alejandro Méndez	January 11, 1992 (aged 17)			(Bolivian Football Federation) Callejas
4	DF	**Ricardo Verdúguez**	July 28, 1989 (aged 19)			(Bolivian Football Federation) Blooming
5	DF	**Ronald Suárez**	December 5, 1990 (aged 18)			(Football Federation of Chile) Universidad de Chile
6	MF	Amílcar Sánchez	January 23, 1991 (aged 17)			(Bolivian Football Federation) Jorge Wilstermann
7	DF	Eliseo Duri	October 16, 1990 (aged 18)			(Bolivian Football Federation) The Strongest
8	MF	Ronald Rea	March 29, 1989 (aged 19)			(Bolivian Football Federation) Oriente Petrolero
9	FW	Jehanamed Castedo	April 4, 1990 (aged 18)			(Bolivian Football Federation) Real Mamoré
10	FW	**Samuel Galindo**	April 18, 1992 (aged 16)			(Bolivian Football Federation) Real América
11	FW	**Alcides Peña**	January 14, 1989 (aged 20)			(Bolivian Football Federation) Oriente Petrolero
12	GK	Pedro Lusquiño	August 4, 1992 (aged 16)			(Bolivian Football Federation) Callejas
13	MF	Axel Bejarano	November 27, 1989 (aged 19)			(Bolivian Football Federation) Universitario de Sucre
14	MF	Nicolás Tudor	May 4, 1990 (aged 18)			(Bolivian Football Federation) Universitario de Sucre
15	MF	Diego Suárez	October 7, 1992 (aged 16)			(Ukrainian Association of Football) Dynamo Kyiv
16	DF	**Rudy Cardozo**	February 14, 1990 (aged 18)			(Israel Football Association) Ironi Ramat
17	FW	Sebastián Molina	November 20, 1990 (aged 18)			(Bolivian Football Federation) Guabirá
18	MF	Jorge González	January 15, 1990 (aged 19)			(Bolivian Football Federation) Blooming
19	FW	Vladimir Castellón	August 12, 1989 (aged 19)			(Bolivian Football Federation) Aurora
20	MF	**Fernando Saucedo**	March 15, 1990 (aged 18)			(Bolivian Football Federation) Oriente Petrolero

== Brazil ==
Coach: Nélson Rodrigues (Brazil)

No.	Pos.	Player	Date of birth (age)	Caps	Goals	Club
1	GK	Renan Ribeiro	March 23, 1990 (aged 18)			(Brazilian Football Confederation) Atlético Mineiro
2	DF	Patric	March 25, 1989 (aged 19)			(Brazilian Football Confederation) Criciúma
3	DF	Welinton	April 10, 1989 (aged 19)			(Brazilian Football Confederation) Flamengo
4	DF	Rafael Toloi	October 10, 1990 (aged 18)	0	0	(Brazilian Football Confederation) Goiás
5	MF	**Sandro**	March 15, 1989 (aged 19)			(Brazilian Football Confederation) Internacional
6	DF	**Everton Ribeiro**	April 10, 1989 (aged 19)			(Brazilian Football Confederation) São Caetano
7	MF	**Giuliano**	May 31, 1990 (aged 18)			(Brazilian Football Confederation) Paraná
8	FW	**Douglas Costa**	September 14, 1990 (aged 18)			(Brazilian Football Confederation) Grêmio
9	FW	Walter	July 22, 1989 (aged 19)			(Brazilian Football Confederation) Internacional
10	FW	Renan Oliveira	December 29, 1989 (aged 19)			(Brazilian Football Confederation) Atlético Mineiro
11	FW	Dentinho	January 19, 1989 (aged 20)			(Brazilian Football Confederation) Corinthians
12	GK	Rafael Pires	June 23, 1989 (aged 19)			(Brazilian Football Confederation) Cruzeiro
13	DF	Leandro Silva	January 11, 1989 (aged 20)			(Brazilian Football Confederation) Coritiba
14	DF	Dalton	February 5, 1990 (aged 18)			(Brazilian Football Confederation) Fluminense
15	DF	Douglas	August 6, 1990 (aged 18)			(Brazilian Football Confederation) Goiás
16	DF	Diogo Silvestre	December 30, 1989 (aged 19)			(Brazilian Football Confederation) São Paulo
17	MF	Zé Eduardo	August 16, 1991 (aged 17)			(Brazilian Football Confederation) Cruzeiro
18	MF	Maylson	March 6, 1989 (aged 19)			(Brazilian Football Confederation) Grêmio
19	MF	Tales	January 20, 1990 (aged 18)			(Brazilian Football Confederation) Internacional
20	FW	Alan Kardec	January 12, 1989 (aged 20)	0	0	(Brazilian Football Confederation) Vasco da Gama

== Chile ==
Coach: Ivo Basay (Chile)

#	Name	Pos	DOB	Club
1	Gregory Saavedra	GK	11.02.1989	Unión Española (Chile)
2	**Paulo Magalhães**	DF	14.12.1989	Cobreloa (Chile)
3	**Carlos Labrín**	DF	02.12.1990	Huachipato (Chile)
4	Bruno Romo	DF	20.05.1989	Colo-Colo (Chile)
5	Bastián Arce	DF	17.08.1989	Colo-Colo (Chile)
6	**Alfonso Parot**	DF	15.10.1989	Club Deportivo Universidad Católica (Chile)
7	Raúl Gutiérrez	FW	04.10.1989	Everton (Chile)
8	Ariel Salinas	MF	09.03.1989	Colo-Colo (Chile)
9	Mauricio Gómez	FW	05.03.1989	U. de Chile
10	**Francisco Pizarro**	FW	10.05.1989	Club Deportivo Universidad Católica (Chile)
11	**Boris Sagredo**	MF	21.03.1989	Colo-Colo (Chile)
12	Fabián Cerda	GK	07.02.1989	Club Deportivo Universidad Católica (Chile)
13	Fabián Torres	DF	27.04.1989	U. de Chile
14	Sebastián Barrientos	MF	20.01.1989	Club Deportivo Universidad Católica (Chile)
15	**Marco Medel**	MF	30.06.1989	Audax Italiano (Chile)
16	**Charles Aránguiz**	MF	17.04.1989	Cobreloa (Chile)
17	**Rafael Caroca**	MF	19.07.1989	Colo-Colo (Chile)
18	David Llanos	FW	27.07.1989	Huachipato (Chile)
19	Esteban Sáez	MF	06.01.1989	Palestino (Chile)
20	Agustín Parra	DF	10.06.1989	Santiago Wanderers (Chile)

== Colombia ==
Coach: José Hélmer Silva (Colombia)

No.	Pos.	Player	Date of birth (age)	Caps	Goals	Club
1	GK	**Andrés Felipe Mosquera Marmolejo**	October 9, 1991 (aged 17)	1	0	(Colombian Football Federation) Corporación Bogotá
12	GK	**Camilo Vargas**	January 9, 1989 (aged 20)	1	0	(Colombian Football Federation) Club Santa Fe
2	DF	Ricardo Chará	May 24, 1990 (aged 18)	2	0	(Italian Football Federation) Udinese
3	DF	Hernán Pertúz	August 2, 1989 (aged 19)	1	0	(Colombian Football Federation) Independiente Medellín
5	DF	Yamith Cuesta	March 20, 1989 (aged 19)	2	1	(Colombian Football Federation) Expreso Rojo
11	DF	Elkin Blanco	July 27, 1988 (aged 20)	3	0	(Colombian Football Federation) Once Caldas
13	DF	Elvis Perlaza	February 6, 1989 (aged 19)	1	1	(Colombian Football Federation) Envigado
17	DF	Andrés Felipe Mosquera Guardia	February 20, 1990 (aged 18)	0	0	(Colombian Football Federation) Independiente Medellín
4	MF	Alex Díaz	January 13, 1989 (aged 20)	1	2	(Colombian Football Federation) Club Deportivo Los Millonarios
6	MF	Julián Guillermo	May 17, 1988 (aged 20)	0	0	(Colombian Football Federation) Cúcuta
8	MF	Dahwlim Leudo	April 21, 1988 (aged 20)	2	0	(Colombian Football Federation) La Equidad
15	MF	Mauricio Arroyo	September 18, 1990 (aged 18)	2	0	(Colombian Football Federation) Real Cartagena
16	MF	Miguel Julio	April 13, 1989 (aged 19)	2	0	(Colombian Football Federation) Independiente Medellín
18	MF	Javier Reina	January 4, 1989 (aged 20)	6	0	(Brazilian Football Confederation) Cruzeiro
20	MF	**Víctor Ibarbo**	May 19, 1990 (aged 18)	4	0	(Italian Football Federation) Udinese
10	MF	Sherman Cárdenas	August 7, 1989 (aged 19)	2	0	(Colombian Football Federation) Bucaramanga
9	FW	Leonardo Castro	May 12, 1989 (aged 19)	2	0	(Colombian Football Federation) Club Deportivo Los Millonarios
7	FW	Cristian Nazarit	August 13, 1990 (aged 18)	3	0	(Colombian Football Federation) Club Santa Fe
19	FW	Cristian Mejía	January 27, 1990 (aged 18)	1	0	(Colombian Football Federation) Deportes Tolima
14	FW	Marco Pérez	September 19, 1990 (aged 18)	3	2	(Colombian Football Federation) Chicó

== Ecuador ==
Coach: Julio César Rosero (Ecuador)

No.	Pos.	Player	Date of birth (age)	Caps	Goals	Club
1	GK	Manuel Mendoza	January 11, 1989 (aged 20)	?	?	(Ecuadorian Football Federation) LDU Portoviejo
2	DF	Wilson Folleco	September 4, 1989 (aged 19)	?	?	(Ecuadorian Football Federation) Imbabura
3	DF	Deison Méndez	October 27, 1990 (aged 18)	?	?	(Ecuadorian Football Federation) LDU Quito
4	DF	Roberto Michael Castro	July 15, 1989 (aged 19)	?	?	(Ecuadorian Football Federation) Deportivo Quito
5	MF	**Jefferson Pinto**	March 27, 1990 (aged 18)	?	?	(Ecuadorian Football Federation) Emelec
6	DF	Hamilton Chasi	February 12, 1990 (aged 18)	?	?	(Ecuadorian Football Federation) Deportivo Cuenca
7	MF	**Jefferson Montero**	September 1, 1989 (aged 19)	?	?	(Mexican Football Federation) Dorados de Sinaloa
8	MF	Israel Chango	January 16, 1989 (aged 20)	?	?	(Ecuadorian Football Federation) LDU Quito
9	FW	**Marlon de Jesús**	September 4, 1991 (aged 17)	?	?	(Ecuadorian Football Federation) El Nacional
10	MF	**Fidel Martínez**	February 15, 1990 (aged 18)	?	?	(Brazilian Football Confederation) Cruzeiro
11	FW	**Joao Rojas**	June 14, 1989 (aged 19)	?	2	(Ecuadorian Football Federation) Técnico Universitario
12	GK	Jonathan Bonilla	November 14, 1989 (aged 19)	?	?	(Ecuadorian Football Federation) Rocafuerte
13	FW	**Juan Luis Anangonó**	April 13, 1989 (aged 19)	?	?	(Ecuadorian Football Federation) Barcelona
14	DF	Harrinson Gómez	January 6, 1989 (aged 20)	?	?	(Ecuadorian Football Federation) Rocafuerte
15	DF	Juan Carlos Anangonó	March 29, 1989 (aged 19)	?	?	(Ecuadorian Football Federation) El Nacional
16	DF	**Marcos Caicedo**	November 10, 1991 (aged 17)	?	?	(Ecuadorian Football Federation) Emelec
17	MF	Steven Zamora	August 28, 1989 (aged 19)	?	?	(Ecuadorian Football Federation) Deportivo Azogues
18	DF	Mike Rodríguez	April 20, 1989 (aged 19)	?	?	(Ecuadorian Football Federation) Barcelona
19	MF	**Fernando Guerrero**	July 31, 1989 (aged 19)	?	?	(Ecuadorian Football Federation) Independiente José Terán
20	MF	**Fabricio Guevara**	February 16, 1989 (aged 19)	?	?	(Ecuadorian Football Federation) El Nacional

== Paraguay ==
Coach: Adrián Coria (Argentina)

No.	Pos.	Player	Date of birth (age)	Caps	Goals	Club
1	GK	**Joel Silva**	January 13, 1989 (aged 20)			(Paraguayan Football Association) Guaraní
2	DF	**Iván Piris**	March 10, 1989 (aged 19)			(Paraguayan Football Association) Cerro Porteño
3	DF	Jonni Cabrera	June 14, 1989 (aged 19)			(Italian Football Federation) Udinese
4	DF	Diego Ayala	January 9, 1990 (aged 19)			(Paraguayan Football Association) Libertad
5	DF	**Ronald Huth**	August 30, 1989 (aged 19)			(The Football Association) Liverpool
6	MF	**Rodrigo Burgos**	June 21, 1989 (aged 19)			(Paraguayan Football Association) Cerro Porteño
7	MF	**Celso Ortiz**	January 26, 1989 (aged 19)			(Paraguayan Football Association) Cerro Porteño
8	MF	**Hernán Pérez**	February 25, 1989 (aged 19)			(Paraguayan Football Association) Libertad
9	FW	**Robin Ramírez**	November 11, 1989 (aged 19)			(Paraguayan Football Association) Libertad
10	MF	Nicolás Martínez	February 15, 1989 (aged 19)			(Paraguayan Football Association) Olimpia
11	MF	**Gustavo Cristaldo**	May 3, 1989 (aged 19)			(Paraguayan Football Association) Libertad
12	GK	Gerardo Ortiz	March 25, 1989 (aged 19)			(Paraguayan Football Association) 3 de Febrero
13	DF	Francisco Silva	October 18, 1990 (aged 18)			(Paraguayan Football Association) Libertad
14	DF	Rolando García	February 10, 1990 (aged 18)			(Paraguayan Football Association) 2 de Mayo
15	DF	**César Benítez**	May 28, 1990 (aged 18)			(Paraguayan Football Association) Cerro Porteño
16	MF	Freddy Coronel	July 22, 1989 (aged 19)			(Paraguayan Football Association) Libertad
17	MF	Aldo Paniagua	July 12, 1989 (aged 19)			(Paraguayan Football Association) General Caballero ZC
18	FW	**Federico Santander**	June 4, 1989 (aged 19)			(Paraguayan Football Association) Guaraní
19	FW	Luis Páez	December 19, 1989 (aged 19)			(Portuguese Football Federation) Fátima
20	FW	Jorge Sanabria	April 22, 1990 (aged 18)			(Paraguayan Football Association) Sportivo Luqueño

== Peru ==
Coach: Tito Chumpitaz (Peru)

#	Name	Pos	DOB	Club
1	Éder Hermoza	GK	04.04.1990	Alianza Lima (Peru)
2	**Aldo Corzo**	DF	20.05.1989	Alianza Lima (Peru)
3	Manuel Calderón	DF	28.01.1990	Universitario de Deportes (Peru)
4	**Adrián Zela**	DF	20.03.1989	Coronel Bolognesi (Peru)
5	**Néstor Duarte**	DF	08.09.1990	Universitario de Deportes (Peru)
6	Ernesto Salazar	MF	19.09.1990	Alianza Lima (Peru)
7	**Reimond Manco**	FW	23.08.1990	PSV Eindhoven (Netherlands)
8	José Luis Nuñez	MF	25.07.1989	Universitario de Deportes (Peru)
9	Juan José Barros	FW	24.06.1989	Coronel Bolognesi (Peru)
10	Anderson Cueto	MF	24.05.1989	Lech Poznań (Poland)
11	**Luis Trujillo**	DF	27.12.1990	Alianza Lima (Peru)
12	Julio Aliaga	GK	26.07.1989	Sporting Cristal (Peru)
13	**Carlos Zambrano**	DF	10.07.1989	Schalke 04 (Germany)
14	Aurelio Saco Vértiz	DF	30.05.1989	Universidad San Martín de Porres (Peru)
15	Daniel Sanchez	MF	02.05.1990	Sporting Cristal (Peru)
16	**Luis Advíncula**	FW	02.03.1990	Juan Aurich (Peru)
17	Manuel Tejada	FW	18.01.1989	Sporting Cristal (Peru)
18	**Damián Ísmodes**	MF	10.03.1989	Racing Santander (Spain)
19	Christian La Torre	FW	09.03.1990	Sport Boys (Peru)
20	**Joel Sánchez**	MF	11.06.1989	Total Chalaco (Peru)

== Uruguay ==
Coach: Diego Aguirre (Uruguay)

No.	Pos.	Player	Date of birth (age)	Caps	Club
1	GK	Nicola Pérez	February 5, 1990 (aged 18)		(Uruguay) Nacional
2	DF	Robert Herrera	March 1, 1989 (aged 19)		(Uruguay) Defensor Sporting
3	DF	Marcelo Silva	March 21, 1989 (aged 19)		(Uruguay) Danubio
4	DF	Adrián Gunino	February 3, 1989 (aged 19)		(Uruguay) Danubio
5	MF	Facundo Píriz	March 27, 1990 (aged 18)		(Uruguay) Nacional
6	DF	Leandro Cabrera	June 17, 1991 (aged 17)		(Uruguay) Defensor Sporting
7	DF	**Matías Aguirregaray**	April 1, 1989 (aged 19)		(Uruguay) Peñarol
8	DF	Maximiliano Calzada	April 21, 1990 (aged 18)		(Uruguay) Nacional
9	FW	Sebastián Charquero	February 21, 1989 (aged 19)		(Uruguay) Wanderers
10	MF	Tabaré Viudez	September 8, 1989 (aged 19)		(Italy) Milan
11	FW	**Abel Hernández**	August 8, 1990 (aged 18)		(Italy) Palermo
12	GK	Martín Rodríguez	September 20, 1989 (aged 19)		(Uruguay) Wanderers
13	FW	Maximiliano Córdoba	December 17, 1990 (aged 18)		(Uruguay) Liverpool
14	MF	**Nicolás Lodeiro**	January 11, 1989 (aged 20)		(Uruguay) Nacional
15	MF	Mauricio Pereyra	March 15, 1990 (aged 18)		(Uruguay) Nacional
16	DF	**Sebastián Coates**	October 7, 1990 (aged 18)		(Uruguay) Nacional
17	FW	**Jonathan Urretaviscaya**	March 19, 1990 (aged 18)		(Portugal) Benfica
18	MF	Agustín Peña	March 8, 1989 (aged 19)		(Uruguay) Wanderers
19	DF	Diego Rodriguez	September 4, 1989 (aged 19)		(Uruguay) Defensor Sporting
20	FW	Santiago García	September 14, 1990 (aged 18)		(Uruguay) Nacional

== Venezuela ==
Coach: César Farías (Venezuela)

#	Name	Pos	DOB	Club
1	**Rafael Romo**	GK	25.02.1990	Llaneros (Venezuela)
2	Francisco Fajardo	DF	08.07.1990	Aragua (Venezuela)
3	**Carlos Salazar**	DF	15.05.1989	Aragua (Venezuela)
4	**José Manuel Velázquez**	DF	08.09.1990	Deportivo Anzoátegui (Venezuela)
5	**Francisco Flores**	MF	30.04.1990	Guaros FC (Venezuela)
6	Guillermo Ramírez	MF	10.11.1989	Caracas (Venezuela)
7	**Yonathan Del Valle**	FW	28.05.1990	Deportivo Táchira (Venezuela)
8	**José Mauricio Parra**	MF	06.02.1990	Deportivo Táchira (Venezuela)
9	**Salomón Rondón**	FW	16.09.1989	Las Palmas (Spain)
10	**Louis Angelo Peña**	MF	25.12.1989	Estudiantes de Mérida (Venezuela)
11	Carlos Fernandez	MF	01.09.1990	Deportivo Anzoátegui (Venezuela)
12	Virgilio Piñero	GK	30.04.1989	Guaros FC (Venezuela)
13	**Pablo Camacho**	DF	12.12.1990	Deportivo Italia (Venezuela)
14	Oscar Rojas	DF	16.01.90	Portuguesa (Venezuela)
15	Henry Pernia	DF	09.11.1990	Llaneros (Venezuela)
16	Juan Manuel Morales	DF	29.07.1989	Tenerife (Spain)
17	Adrián Lezama	FW	22.07.1989	Deportivo Anzoátegui (Venezuela)
18	**Arquímedes Figuera**	FW	06.10.1989	Atlético Trujillo (Venezuela)
19	Carlos Varela	MF	14.06.1990	Guaros FC (Venezuela)
20	**Rafael Acosta**	MF	13.02.1989	Cagliari (Italy)
