= Football at the 2007 Pan American Games =

- Venues: Rio de Janeiro
- Dates: July 12−27
- No. of events: 2 (1 men, 1 women)

Football competitions at the 2007 Pan American Games in Rio de Janeiro, Brazil were held between July 12 and 27, 2007.

Matches were held at five stadiums in the city.

== Medal summary ==
=== Medal table ===
Rank	Nation	Gold	Silver	Bronze	Total
1	Brazil	1	0	0	1
1	Ecuador	1	0	0	1
3	Jamaica	0	1	0	1
3	United States	0	1	0	1
5	Canada	0	0	1	1
5	Mexico	0	0	1	1
Totals (6 entries)		2	2	2	6

=== Medalists ===
Event	Gold	Silver	Bronze
Men's tournament	Ecuador; Máximo Banguera; Wilson Folleco; Deison Mendez; Roberto Castro; Jefferson Pinto; Hamilton Chasi; Jesus Alcivar; Jefferson Montero; Edmundo Zura; Alex Alcivar; Fabricio Guevara; German Vera; Carlos Delgado; Alex George; Eduardo Bone; Israel Chango; Fidel Martinez; Pablo Ochoa	Jamaica; Dwayne Miller; Andrae Campbell; Ajuran Brown; Jermaine Jarrett; Ricardo Cousins; Eric Vernon; Kemmar Daley; James Thomas; Edward Campbell; Obrian Woodbine; Duwayne Kerr; Alanzo Adlam; Dawyne Smith; John-Ross Doyley; Norman Bailey; Damaine Thompson; Troy Smith; Draion McNain	Mexico; Javier Sergio Arias; Emmanuel Christian Sanchez; Ivan Marco Perez; Hugo Ayala; Oscar Jose Recio; Alejandro Berber; Raul Martinez; Rodolfo Salinas; Alejandro Enrique Esqueda; Adrian Moises Velasco; Emmanuel Cerda; Aaron Fernandez; Arsenio Ever Guzman; Jonathan Jose Piña; Eduardo Barron; Mario Gallegos; Emmanuel Jorge Torres; Rodolfo Real Del
Women's tournament	Brazil; Andréia Suntaque; Simone Jatoba; Aline Pellegrino; Renata Costa; Elaine Moura; Rosana Augusto; Daniela Alves; Miraildes Mota; Kátia Cilene; Marta Silva; Cristiane Silva; Bárbara Barbosa; Delma Gonçalves; Andreia Santos; Tânia Ribeiro; Grazielle Nascimento; Daiane Rodrigues; Ester Santos	United States; Alyssa Naeher; Brittany Taylor; Nikki Washington; Kaley Fountain; Teresa Noyola; Nikki Marshall; Casey Nogueira; Lauren Cheney; Jessica McDonald; Michelle Enyeart; Tobin Heath; Kylie Wright; Lauren Barnes; Gina Dimartino; Becky Edwards; Lauren Wilmoth; Kelley O'Hara; Chantel Jones	Canada; Karina LeBlanc; Kristina Kiss; Melanie Booth; Melissa Tancredi; Andrea Neil; Sasha Andrews; Rhian Wilkinson; Diana Matheson; Candace Chapman; Martina Franko; Randee Hermus; Christine Sinclair; Amy Walsh; Kara Lang; Katie Thorlakson; Brittany Timko; Amy Vermeulen; Taryn Swiatek
