= Ecuador at the 2007 Pan American Games =

- IOC code: ECU
- NOC: Comité Olímpico Ecuatoriano
- Website: www.coe.org.ec

in Rio de Janeiro 13–29 July 2007
- Competitors: 150
- Flag bearer: Seledina Hieves
- Medals Ranked 11th: Gold 5 Silver 4 Bronze 10 Total 19

Pan American Games appearances (overview)
- 1951; 1955; 1959; 1963; 1967; 1971; 1975; 1979; 1983; 1987; 1991; 1995; 1999; 2003; 2007; 2011; 2015; 2019; 2023; 2027

The 15th Pan American Games were held in Rio de Janeiro, Brazil from 13 July 2007 to 29 July 2007.

== Medals ==
=== Gold ===
===== Athletics =====
- Men's 20 km Road Walk: Jefferson Pérez
- Men's 50 km Road Walk: Xavier Moreno

===== Football =====
- Men's Team Competition: Ecuador national football team

===== Weightlifting =====
- Women's – 58 kg: Alexandra Escobar
- Women's – 75 kg: Seledina Nieve

=== Silver ===
===== Athletics =====
- Men's 20 km Road Walk: Rolando Saquipay
- Women's 20 km Road Walk: Miriam Ramón

===== Judo =====
- Men's – 66 kg: Roberto Ibáñez
- Women's + 78 kg: Carmen Chalá

=== Bronze ===
===== Athletics =====
- Men's 1500 metres: Byron Piedra

===== Boxing =====
- Men's Middleweight (– 75 kg): Carlos Góngora
- Men's Light Heavyweight (– 81 kg): Julio Castillo
- Men's Heavyweight (– 91 kg): Jorge Quiñónez

===== Karate =====
- Men's + 80 kg: Andrés Heredia
- Women's – 60 kg: Carmen Arias

===== Judo =====
- Women's – 57 kg: Diana Villavicencio

===== Roller skating =====
- Men's Individual Race: Jorge Bolaños

===== Weightlifting =====
- Men's – 69 kg: Ricardo Flores

===== Wrestling =====
- Men's Greco-Roman – 55 kg: Ángel Lema

== Results by event ==
=== Football ===
==== Men's team competition ====
- Preliminary Round
  - Drew with Costa Rica (1-1)
  - Defeated Honduras (3-2)
  - Defeated Brazil (4-2)
- Semi Finals
  - Defeated Bolivia (1-0)
- Final
  - Defeated Jamaica (2-1) → Gold Medal
- Team Roster
  - Máximo Banguera
  - Wilson Folleco
  - Deison Méndez
  - Michael Castro
  - Jefferson Pinto
  - Hamilton Chasi
  - Jesús Alcívar
  - Jefferson Montero
  - Edmundo Zura
  - Álex Alcívar
  - Fabricio Guevara
  - Germán Vera
  - Carlos Delgado
  - Álex George
  - Eduardo Bone
  - Israel Chango
  - Fidel Martínez
  - Pablo Ochoa

=== Triathlon ===
==== Women's Competition ====
- Paola Bonilla
  - 2:02:16.72 — 11th place
- Elizabeth Bravo
  - 2:11:01.88 — 22nd place

== See also ==
- Ecuador at the 2008 Summer Olympics
