= 2009 in Ecuadorian football =

Football in Ecuador
- Season: 2009

The 2009 season is the 87th season of competitive football in Ecuador.

== National leagues ==
=== Serie A ===
- Champion: Deportivo Quito (4th title)
  - Runner-up: Deportivo Cuenca
- International cup qualifiers:
  - 2009 Copa Sudamericana: Emelec, LDU Quito
  - 2010 Copa Libertadores: Deportivo Quito, Deportivo Cuenca, Emelec
- Relegated: LDU Portoviejo, Técnico Universitario

=== Serie B ===
- Winner: Independiente José Terán (1st title)
  - Runner-up: Universidad Católica
- Promoted: Universidad Católica, Independiente José Terán
- Relegated: Aucas

=== Segunda ===
- Winner: UT Cotopaxi (1st title)
  - Runner-up: River Plate
- Promoted: River Plate, UT Cotopaxi, Universidad Técnica Equinoccial

== Clubs in international competitions ==
Team	2009 Copa Libertadores	2009 Copa Sudamericana	2009 Recopa Sudamericana
Deportivo Cuenca	Eliminated in the Round of 16	N/A	N/A
Deportivo Quito	Eliminated in the Second Stage	N/A	N/A
El Nacional	Eliminated in the First Stage	N/A	N/A
Emelec	N/A	Eliminated in the Round of 16	N/A
LDU Quito	Eliminated in the Second Stage	Winner	Winner

== National team ==
=== Senior team ===
==== 2010 FIFA World Cup qualifiers ====
The senior team finished all their qualifying games this year. They failed to qualify to their third successive FIFA World Cup.

March 29, 2009
16:00 (UTC-5)

Ecuador	1 – 1	Brazil
Noboa 89'	Report	Baptista 72'

Estadio Olímpico Atahualpa, Quito
Attendance: 40,000
Referee: Carlos Chandía (Chile)

April 1, 2009
16:20 (UTC-5)

Ecuador	1 – 1	Paraguay
Noboa 63'	Report	Benítez 90+3'

Estadio Olímpico Atahualpa, Quito
Attendance: 36,853
Referee: Wilmar Roldán (Colombia)

June 7, 2009
15:30 (UTC-5)

Peru	1 – 2	Ecuador
Vargas 52'	Report	Montero 38'; Tenorio 58'

Estadio Monumental "U", Lima
Attendance: 17,050
Referee: Carlos Torres (Paraguay)

June 10, 2009
16:00 (UTC-5)

Ecuador	2 – 0	Argentina
Ayoví 72'; Palacios 83'	Report

Estadio Olímpico Atahualpa, Quito
Attendance: 36,359
Referee: Carlos Chandía (Chile)

September 5, 2009
15:30 (UTC-5)

Colombia	2 – 0	Ecuador
Martínez 82'; Gutiérrez 90+4'	Report

Estadio Atanasio Girardot, Medellín
Attendance: 42,000
Referee: Sergio Pezzotta (Argentina)

September 9, 2009
15:00 (UTC-4)

Bolivia	1 – 3	Ecuador
Yecerotte 85'	Report	Méndez 4'; Valencia 46'; Benítez 56'

Estadio Hernando Siles, La Paz
Attendance: 10,200
Referee: Héctor Baldassi (Argentina)

October 10, 2009
17:00 (UTC-5)

Ecuador	1 – 2	Uruguay
Valencia 67'	Report	Suárez 69'; Forlán 90+4' (pen.)

Estadio Olímpico Atahualpa, Quito
Attendance: 42,700
Referee: Salvio Fagundes (Brazil)

14 October 2009
19:00 UTC-3

Chile	1 – 0	Ecuador
Suazo 51'	Report

Estadio Monumental, Santiago
Attendance: 47,000
Referee: Carlos Torres (Paraguay)

==== Friendlies ====
10 February 2009
21:00 (UTC+1)

Ecuador	3 – 2	England U-21
Guerrón 52'; Palacios 53'; Caicedo 81'	Report	Johnson 13'; Campbell 41'

Estadio La Rosaleda, Málaga, Spain
Referee: Mario Melero López (Spain)

Note: This is an unofficial international friendly.

27 May 2009
20:00 (UTC-7)

Ecuador	1 – 3	El Salvador
Jefferson Montero 8'		Romero 10', 51'; Corrales 45'

Los Angeles Memorial Coliseum, Los Angeles, United States

12 August 2009
20:40 (UTC-4)

Ecuador	0 – 0	Jamaica
	Report

Giants Stadium, East Rutherford, New Jersey, United States
Referee: Jair Marrufo (United States)

=== Under-20 team ===
The under-20 team participated in the 2009 South American Youth Championship in Venezuela. They were eliminated by coin toss.

19 January 2009
18:00 (UTC-4:30)

Peru	1 – 2	Ecuador
Barros 28' (pen.)	Report	Rojas 4', 22'

Estadio Monumental de Maturín, Maturín
Attendance: 30,000
Referee: Líber Prudente (Uruguay)

21 January 2009
20:30 (UTC-4:30)

Ecuador	0 – 0	Venezuela
	Report

Estadio Monumental de Maturín, Maturín
Attendance: 10,000
Referee: Antonio Arias (Paraguay)

23 January 2009
18:00 (UTC-4:30)

Ecuador	0 – 0	Colombia
	Report

Estadio Monumental de Maturín, Maturín
Referee: Salvio Fagundes (Brazil)

27 January 2009
18:00 (UTC-4:30)

Argentina	2 – 2	Ecuador
Gaitán 32'; Bella 79'	Report	Pinto 39'; Anangonó 78'

Estadio Monumental de Maturín, Maturín
Attendance: 2,000
Referee: Salvio Fagundes (Brazil)

=== Under-17 team ===
The 2009 South American Under-17 Football Championship was held in Chile, in which Ecuador's U-17 team participated. They were drawn into Group B, from which they managed to advance to the Final Group. They failed to qualified to the 2009 FIFA U-17 World Cup in Nigeria.
Group B matches

12 April 2009
19:00 (UTC-4)

Venezuela	0 – 2	Ecuador
	Report	Celi 62'; Tello 87'

Estadio Tierra de Campeones, Iquique
Referee: Joaquín Antequera (Bolivia)

24 April 2009
19:00 (UTC-4)

Argentina	1 – 1	Ecuador
Villalba 20'	Report	de la Cruz 58' (pen.)

Estadio Tierra de Campeones, Iquique
Referee: Carlos Galeano (Paraguay)

27 April 2009
22:00 (UTC-4)

Chile	1 – 0	Ecuador
Andia 87'	Report

Estadio Tierra de Campeones, Iquique
Attendance: 5,000
Referee: Joaquín Antequera (Bolivia)

30 April 2009
19:00 (UTC-4)

Uruguay	1 – 1	Ecuador
de los Santos 2'	Report	de la Cruz 23' (pen.)

Estadio Tierra de Campeones, Iquique
Referee: Víctor Hugo Carrillo (Peru)

Final Group matches

3 May 2009
22:00 (UTC-4)

Colombia	3 – 0	Ecuador
Cardona 1', 27', 40' (pen.)	Report

Estadio Tierra de Campeones, Iquique
Attendance: 2,000
Referee: Jorge Osorio (Chile)

6 May 2009
22:00 (UTC-4)

Ecuador	1 – 4	Bolivia
Villaprado 73'	Report	Álvarez 29', 35'; Galindo 65'; Castro 74'

Estadio Tierra de Campeones, Iquique
Attendance: 3,000
Referee: Víctor Hugo Carrillo (Peru)

9 May 2009
19:00 (UTC-4)

Ecuador	1 – 3	Uruguay
Caicedo 79'	Report	Barreto 35' (pen.); Luna 53', 58'

Estadio Tierra de Campeones, Iquique
Attendance: 2,000
Referee: Diego Abal (Argentina)
