= Seba =

Seba or SEBA may refer to:

== People ==
- Sebá (born 1992), Brazilian footballer Sebastião de Freitas Couto Júnior
- Seba (surname)
- Seba (musician), Swedish musician Sebastian Ahrenberg
- Seba Smith (1792–1868), American writer and humorist
- Sebastián Barrientos (born 1989), Chilean former footballer
- Sebastiano Serafini (born 1990), Italian actor, model and musician
- Sebastián Setti (born 1984), Argentine footballer
- Sebastian Sorsa (born 1984), Finnish footballer
- SEBA, Antwerp rapper

== Places ==
- Seba, Indonesia, on the Savu Islands
- Seven Brothers Islands, also known as the Seba Islands, part of the Republic of Djibouti

== SEBA ==
- Secondary Education Board of Assam, India
- Systematic and Evolutionary Biogeography Association

== Other uses ==
- Seba bat, a species of bat
- Seba (biblical figure), a minor figure in the Bible
- Seba language, a Bantu language of the Democratic Republic of Congo
- A Hawu language dialect
- Seba Station, a railway station in Shiojiri City, Japan
- SEBA Book Award (now called Southern Book Prize), an American literary award
- Seba United, former name and current nickname of the Jamaican football club Montego Bay United F.C.
