= Diego Ayala =

Diego Ayala may refer to:

- Diego Ayala (footballer) (born 1990), Paraguayan footballer
- Diego Ayala (tennis) (born 1979), American tennis player
