= Marcelo Benítez =

Marcelo Benítez is the name of two footballers:

- Marcelo Benítez (footballer, born 1989), Argentine footballer
- Marcelo Benítez (footballer, born 1991), Argentine footballer
