= Mike Rodríguez =

Mike Rodríguez may refer to:

- Mike Rodríguez (footballer) (born 1989), Ecuadorian footballer
- Mike Rodríguez (fighter) (born 1988), American mixed martial arts fighter
- Michael Rodriguez (politician), American politician
