= Gregory Saavedra =

Chilean footballer (born 1989)

Personal information
- Full name: Greogry Andrés Saavedra Morales
- Date of birth: 11 February 1989 (age 37)
- Place of birth: Santiago, Chile
- Height: 1.76 m (5 ft 9 in)
- Position: Goalkeeper

Youth career
- Unión Española

Senior career*
Years	Team	Apps	(Gls)
2008–2010	Unión Española	0	(0)
2011	Deportes Temuco	24	(0)
2012–2013	Trasandino	21	(0)
2013	Barnechea	15	(0)
2016–2017	Deportes Melipilla	9	(0)
2017	Deportes Pintana	0	(0)

International career^{‡}
2008	Chile U18		
2008	Chile U23	4	(0)
2009	Chile U20	4	(0)
- * Club domestic league appearances and goals as of 13 October 2021 ‡ National team caps and goals as of 30 January 2009

Gregory Andrés Saavedra Morales (born 11 February 1989) is a Chilean footballer. His last club was Deportes Pintana in the Segunda División Profesional de Chile.

== International career ==
Along with Chile U18 he won the 2008 João Havelange Tournament and also represented Chile U23 at the 2008 Inter Continental Cup in Malaysia.

In 2009, he represented Chile U20 at the 2009 South American U-20 Championship.

== Honours ==
=== Club ===
Trasandino

- Tercera A (1): 2012

=== International ===
Chile U18

- João Havelange Tournament (1): 2008
