= Football at the 2007 Pan American Games – Men's tournament =

Men's football tournament at the 2007 Pan American Games
- Venue: Rio de Janeiro
- Dates: 15 – 27 July
- Competitors: 216 from 12 nations

Medalists
Gold medal	Ecuador
Silver medal	Jamaica
Bronze medal	Mexico

In the men's football tournament of the 2007 Pan American Games, the Pan American Sports Organisation expanded the number of participants from 8 to 12 and set the age limit to the Under-20 level. However, CONMEBOL, representing the South American nations, only accepted to play with Under-17 teams (who qualified through the 2007 South American Under-17 Football Championship), since Under-20 teams had to participate at the U-20 World Cup at the same time.

The United States accepted to play with their Under-18 team. Finally, Peru declined to play because their U-17 team preferred to play friendlies in Asia in preparation for the U-17 World Cup, so Bolivia took their place.

In the final, Ecuador beat Jamaica to win their first gold medal.

== Participants ==
The participating nations were:

- CONCACAF
  - Costa Rica
  - Haiti
  - Honduras
  - Jamaica
  - Mexico
  - United States
- CONMEBOL
  - Argentina
  - Brazil
  - Colombia
  - Ecuador
  - Bolivia (replaced Peru)
  - Venezuela

== Preliminary round ==
=== Group A ===
Pos	Team	Pld	W	D	L	GF	GA	GD	Pts
1	Ecuador	3	2	1	0	8	5	+3	7
2	Brazil	3	2	0	1	7	4	+3	6
3	Honduras	3	1	0	2	4	7	−3	3
4	Costa Rica	3	0	1	2	2	5	−3	1

15 July
11:15

Ecuador	1–1	Costa Rica
Ochoa 32'		Brenes 13'

Estádio Miécimo da Silva, Rio de Janeiro

15 July
15:30

Brazil	3–0	Honduras
Lulinha 22' (pen.), 66', 90' (pen.)

Estádio Olímpico João Havelange, Rio de Janeiro

18 July
15:30

Brazil	2–0	Costa Rica
Maicon 18'; Alex Teixeira 24'

Estádio Olímpico João Havelange, Rio de Janeiro

18 July
18:15

Honduras	2–3	Ecuador
Martínez 10'; Leverón 65' (pen.)		Zura 11'; Castro 20' (o.g.); Chango 67'

Centro de Futebol Zico, Rio de Janeiro

21 July
15:00

Brazil	2–4	Ecuador
Luiz Júnior 37'; Alex Teixeira 71'		Chasi 45'; Zura 47'; Montero 62'; Ochoa 86'

Estádio Jornalista Mário Filho (Maracanã), Rio de Janeiro

21 July
15:00

Costa Rica	1–2	Honduras
Brenes 10'		Leverón 21', 34'

Estádio Miécimo da Silva, Rio de Janeiro

=== Group B ===
Pos	Team	Pld	W	D	L	GF	GA	GD	Pts
1	Bolivia	3	2	1	0	7	3	+4	7
2	Mexico	3	2	1	0	5	1	+4	7
3	United States	3	1	0	2	4	7	−3	3
4	Venezuela	3	0	0	3	1	6	−5	0

15 July
14:00

Mexico	1–1	Bolivia
Esqueda 63'		Gutiérrez 26'

Estádio Miécimo da Silva, Rio de Janeiro

15 July
18:15

United States	2–1	Venezuela
McCarthy 50'; Warshaw 90+3'		Flores 76' (pen.)

Centro de Futebol Zico, Rio de Janeiro

18 July
15:00

Bolivia	4–2	United States
Pinedo 47', 81'; Fierro 56'; Gutiérrez 63'		Gonzalez 34', 41'

Estádio Miécimo da Silva, Rio de Janeiro

18 July
18:15

Mexico	2–0	Venezuela
Velasco 2'; Esqueda 14'

Estádio Olímpico João Havelange, Rio de Janeiro

21 July
10:00

United States	0–2	Mexico
		Del Real 75'; Esqueda 78'

Estádio Jornalista Mário Filho (Maracanã), Rio de Janeiro

21 July
10:00

Venezuela	0–2	Bolivia
		Fierro 7', 34'

Centro de Futebol Zico, Rio de Janeiro

=== Group C ===
Pos	Team	Pld	W	D	L	GF	GA	GD	Pts
1	Jamaica	3	3	0	0	7	0	+7	9
2	Colombia	3	1	1	1	1	1	0	4
3	Argentina	3	0	2	1	1	3	−2	2
4	Haiti	3	0	1	2	1	6	−5	1

15 July
15:30

Colombia	0–1	Jamaica
		Daley 76'

Centro de Futebol Zico, Rio de Janeiro

15 July
18:15

Argentina	1–1	Haiti
Mazzola 37'		Mechack 33'

Estádio Olímpico João Havelange, Rio de Janeiro

18 July
12:30

Jamaica	2–0	Argentina
Daley 80', 90'

Estádio Miécimo da Silva, Rio de Janeiro

18 July
15:30

Haiti	0–1	Colombia
		Nazarith 54'

Centro de Futebol Zico, Rio de Janeiro

21 July
12:30

Jamaica	4–0	Haiti
Thomas 2'; Doyley 18'; Daley 26'; Cousins 67'

Centro de Futebol Zico, Rio de Janeiro

21 July
12:30

Argentina	0–0	Colombia

Estádio Miécimo da Silva, Rio de Janeiro

== Final round ==
Semi-finals
24 July – Rio de Janeiro (Maracanã)
Jamaica	0 (5)
Mexico	0 (4)
24 July – Rio de Janeiro (Maracanã)
Bolivia	0
Ecuador	1

Final
27 July – Rio de Janeiro (Maracanã)
Jamaica	1
Ecuador	2
Third place
27 July – Rio de Janeiro (Maracanã)
Mexico	1
Bolivia	0

=== Semifinals ===
24 July
15:30

Jamaica	0–0	Mexico
Penalties
	5–4

Estádio Jornalista Mário Filho (Maracanã), Rio de Janeiro

24 July
19:00

Bolivia	0–1	Ecuador
		Delgado 64'

Estádio Jornalista Mário Filho (Maracanã), Rio de Janeiro

=== Bronze-medal match ===
27 July
12:00

Mexico	1–0	Bolivia
Esqueda 73'

Estádio Jornalista Mário Filho (Maracanã), Rio de Janeiro

=== Gold-medal match ===
27 July
15:00

Jamaica	1–2	Ecuador
Vernan 5'	Report	Montero 78'; Zura 83' (pen.)

Estádio Jornalista Mário Filho (Maracanã), Rio de Janeiro
Referee: Paulo de Oliveira (BRA)

Jamaica
Ecuador

GK	13	Duwayne Kerr
DF	5	Ajuran Brown
DF	10	Shavar Thomas
DF	17	Norman Bailey
MF	9	Keammar Daley
MF	18	Damaine Thompson
MF	11	Edward Campbell
MF	19	Troy Smith
MF	7	Ricardo Cousins
FW	15	Dawyne Smith
FW	12	Obrian Woodbine
Manager:
Wendell Downswell

GK	1	Máximo Banguera
DF	2	Wilson Folleco
DF	3	Deison Méndez
DF	4	Michael Castro
DF	6	Hamilton Chasi
MF	13	Carlos Delgado
MF	16	Israel Chango
MF	5	Jefferson Pinto
MF	8	Jefferson Montero
FW	9	Edmundo Zura
FW	18	Pablo Ochoa
Manager:
Sixto Vizuete

2007 Pan American Games Men's football tournament
Winners

Ecuador
1st title

== Final ranking ==
Place	Team
Gold medal	Ecuador
Silver medal	Jamaica
Bronze medal	Mexico
4	Bolivia
5	Brazil
6	Colombia
7	Honduras
7	United States
9	Argentina
10	Costa Rica
11	Haiti
12	Venezuela

== Goalscorers ==
4 goals

- (Jamaica) Keammar Daley
- (Mexico) Enrique Esqueda
