= Enrique Esqueda =

Mexican footballer (born 1988)

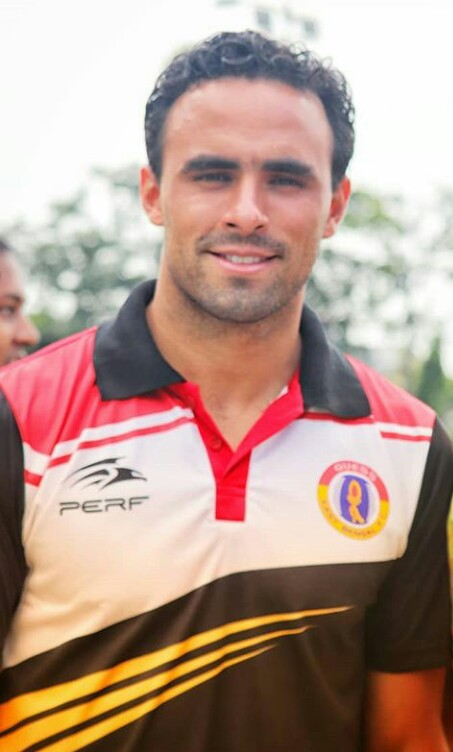
- Esqueda with East Bengal in 2019

Personal information
- Full name: Enrique Alejandro Esqueda Tirado
- Date of birth: 19 April 1988 (age 38)
- Place of birth: Querétaro, Mexico
- Height: 1.80 m (5 ft 11 in)
- Position: Striker

Senior career*
Years	Team	Apps	(Gls)
2005–2011	América	107	(15)
2011–2014	Pachuca	36	(9)
2014	→ Atlas (loan)	16	(3)
2015	Tigres UANL	18	(2)
2016	Veracruz	6	(1)
2017	Juárez	0	(0)
2017	Chiapas	5	(0)
2018	Arka Gdynia	8	(2)
2018–2019	East Bengal	14	(9)
Total		210	(41)

International career
2005	Mexico U17	2	(2)
2007	Mexico U20	2	(1)
2007	Mexico U23	12	(5)
2007–2015	Mexico	9	(1)

Managerial career
- 2021: Cañada CTM (assistant)
- 2024: Peluche Caligari (AQL)
- 2024: Peluche Caligari (AKL)
Medal record
Representing Mexico
Men's Football
FIFA U-17 World Cup
Winner	2005 Peru
Pan American Games
Bronze medal – third place	2007 Rio de Janeiro	Team competition
- * Club domestic league appearances and goals

Enrique Alejandro Esqueda Tirado (born 19 April 1988) is a Mexican former professional footballer who played as a striker. He represented Mexico at the 2015 Copa América. He is popularly known by his nickname "Paleta".

== Club career ==
=== América ===
At club level, he made his debut for América on 4 February 2006 against Atlas. His debut in an international tournament came in 2007, when América participated in the Copa Sudamericana, where they finished runner-up. In 2009, América participated in the World Football Challenge, where he scored in the 2–1 win against AC Milan. In 2011, Esqueda scored against European powerhouses Manchester City in a 1–1 draw and against Real Madrid in a 2–3 loss.

=== Pachuca, Atlas, Tigres UANL, Veracruz and Chiapas ===
On 23 May 2011, he was transferred to C.F. Pachuca. After several years of injuries and ups and downs with Pachuca, he was loaned to Atlas in 2014. Under the command of Tomás Boy, Esqueda scored three goals with Atlas in the season. On 2015, he was loaned again to Tigres UANL. With Tigres, he scored a hat-trick in the Copa Libertadores 2015 victory of 5–4 over Juan Aurich on 15 April 2015. He also scored the last goal of the 3–0 victory in the Clásico Regiomontano against arch-rivals C.F. Monterrey on 18 April, as well as Tigres' first goal in the 2–1 victory over Bolivian side Club Universitario in the round of 16 of the 2015 Copa Libertadores.

After winning his first Liga MX with Tigres UANL as a reserve player, Esqueda was loaned out to Veracruz where he had a discreet stint. In July 2016, Esqueda was loaned out to second division team FC Juárez a move which Esqueda refused to comply with. After an inactive fall 2016 semester, Esqueda was loaned out to Chiapas F.C. His resentment for Tigres UANL is apparent as he has publicly desecrated the Tigres UANL crest on television.

After the disaffiliation of Chiapas F.C., Esqueda became a free agent.

=== Arka Gdynia ===
On 20 January 2018, Esqueda began trials with Ekstraklasa club Arka Gdynia. On 22 January, he made his unofficial debut with the Polish side in a friendly against Romanian side Botoșani, and scored opening goal in a 2–0 win, making Esqueda the 1st Mexican to score for any team in Poland. On 6 February, he signed a contract valid for the rest of 2017–18 season, with an extension option.

=== East Bengal ===
On 20 August 2018, free agent Esqueda joined Indian I-League club East Bengal for the upcoming season. On 27 October, he made his debut, scoring a brace in a 2–0 victory over NEROCA. He went onto score 9 goals in 14 matches as East Bengal finished 2nd in the I-League, with 3 assists and 3 Man of the Match awards. He finished as the highest goal getter for East Bengal along with teammate Joby Justin in the 2018–19 I-League season. On 10 March 2019, Enrique was released from his contract.

== International career ==
Esqueda was a part of the U-17 world champion team in Peru in 2005. He was also part of the U-20 team that represented Mexico at the 2007 FIFA U-20 World Cup, but was cut from the team at the last minute. He formed part of the U-23 team that was to represent Mexico at the 2007 Pan American Games in Rio de Janeiro, Brazil. He helped Mexico achieve a bronze medal, with him scoring four goals, becoming one of the top scorers of the tournament.

He was called up by the Mexico national team for a game against El Salvador. He scored his first goal on 14 October 2009 against Trinidad & Tobago in a 2–2 draw.

His most recent appearance was on 3 June 2015 in a friendly against Peru. He was part of the 2015 Copa America roster, however he did not make any appearances during the tournament.

=== International goals ===
No.	Date	Venue	Opponent	Score	Result	Competition	Ref.
1.	14 October 2009	Hasley Crawford Stadium, Port of Spain, Trinidad and Tobago	Trinidad and Tobago	1–1	2–2	2010 FIFA World Cup qualifiers	

=== International appearances ===
As of 12 October 2010

International appearances
#	Date	Venue	Opponent	Result	Competition
1.	22 August 2007	Dick's Sporting Goods Park, Commerce City, United States	Colombia	0–1	Friendly
2.	24 September 2008	Memorial Coliseum, Los Angeles, United States	Chile	0–1	Friendly
3.	30 September 2009	Cotton Bowl, Dallas, United States	Colombia	1–2	Friendly
4.	14 October 2009	Hasely Crawford Stadium, Port of Spain, Trinidad and Tobago	Trinidad and Tobago	2–2	2010 FIFA World Cup qualification
5.	11 August 2010	Estadio Azteca, Mexico City, Mexico	Spain	1–1	Friendly
6.	4 September 2010	Estadio Omnilife, Zapopan, Mexico	Ecuador	1–2	Friendly
7.	7 September 2010	Estadio Universitario, San Nicolás, Mexico	Colombia	1–0	Friendly
8.	12 October 2010	Estadio Olímpico Benito Juárez, Ciudad Juárez, Mexico	Venezuela	2–2	Friendly
9.	3 June 2015	Estadio Nacional de Lima, Lima, Peru	Peru	1–1	Friendly

== Honours ==
América

- InterLiga: 2008

East Bengal

- I-League: Runner-up 2018–19

Tigres UANL

- Liga MX: Apertura 2015

Mexico U-17

- FIFA U-17 World Championship: 2005
- Pan American Games: Bronze medal 2007
