= Diego Ayala (footballer) =

Paraguayan footballer (born 1990)

Personal information
- Full name: Diego Andres Ayala Santa Cruz
- Date of birth: 9 January 1990 (age 36)
- Place of birth: Asunción, Paraguay
- Height: 1.77 m (5 ft 10 in)
- Positions: Left back; midfielder

Team information
- Current team: Nybergsund
- Number: 11

Senior career*
Years	Team	Apps	(Gls)
2008–2010	Club Libertad	2	(0)
2010–2011	All Boys	0	(0)
2012	General Caballero	0	(0)
2013–	Nybergsund	0	(0)

International career
2009	Paraguay U20		
- * Club domestic league appearances and goals as of 5 April 2013

Diego Andres Ayala Santa Cruz (born 9 January 1990) is a Paraguayan footballer who currently plays for Nybergsund.

He played for the Paraguay Under-20s in the South American Youth Championship Venezuela 2009.

== Teams ==
- Libertad 2008–2010
- All Boys 2010–2012
