= Mike Rodríguez (footballer) =

Ecuadorian footballer (born 1989)

Personal information
- Full name: Mike Davis Rodríguez Sornoza
- Date of birth: April 20, 1989 (age 37)
- Place of birth: Guayaquil
- Height: 1.71 m (5 ft 7 in)
- Position: Midfielder

Team information
- Current team: Deportivo Quito

Youth career
- 2003–2009: Barcelona

Senior career*
Years	Team	Apps	(Gls)
2006–2012	Barcelona	68	(8)
2013–2014	Deportivo Cuenca		
2015–	Deportivo Quito		
- * Club domestic league appearances and goals as of 04 April 2010

Mike Davis Rodríguez Sornoza (born April 20, 1989) is an Ecuadorian footballer. He currently plays for Ecuadorian Deportivo Quito. He is considered to be one of the young promises of Ecuadorian football along with Jefferson Pinto, Fernando Guerrero, Michael Arroyo, Jefferson Montero, and Felipe Caicedo.

== International career ==
Rodriguez made his appearance internationally in the 2007 South American Youth Championship. In May 2008 he scored a double against Deportivo Quito in Quito, making him an important figure for his club.
