= Jorge Sanabria =

Argentine footballer

Personal information
- Full name: Jorge Armando Sanabria
- Date of birth: 8 September 1952 (age 74)
- Place of birth: Paso de los Libres, Argentina
- Position: Forward

Senior career*
Years	Team	Apps	(Gls)
1975-1979	Huracán	133	(52)
1980	Vélez	20	(6)
1980	Independiente (Avellaneda)	10	(4)
1981	Argentinos Juniors	8	(1)
1982	Quilmes	13	(3)
1982	Central Norte	7	(2)
- AmaZulu
- Águila
- * Club domestic league appearances and goals

Jorge Armando Sanabria (born 8 September 1952) is an Argentine retired footballer who is last known to have played as a attacker for Águila.

== Career ==
Sanabria started his career with Argentine side Huracán, where he made 133 league appearances and scored 52 goals. After that, Sanabria signed for AmaZulu in South Africa, where he said, "I go to a team where they were all black. Football there, in general, was black. I arrived and, first, the look ..., a certain rejection ..., I tried to touch them and they moved away as if one were an animal. They ran. When I approached a little boy, he thought I was going to hit him."

After that, Sanabria signed for Salvadoran club Águila, where he said, "They [guerrillas] stopped the bus. "Collaboration for the cause...", they said and asked you for money. They were from the MLN. We had a Brazilian on the team. And once they wanted to take it away. "You, Brazilian, you come with us to the mountain." The guy started crying, but nothing. "You come". And we, at that time, had the player who had scored the only goal for El Salvador in the World Cup in Spain: Zapata. He spoke with the guerrilla so that they would not take the Brazilian."
