= Hernán Pertúz =

Colombian footballer (born 1989)

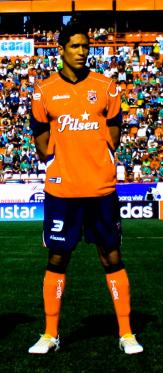

Personal information
- Full name: Hernán Enrique Pertúz Ortega
- Date of birth: March 31, 1989 (age 37)
- Place of birth: Barranquilla, Colombia
- Height: 6 ft 0 in (1.83 m)
- Position: Defender

Youth career
- Medellín

Senior career*
Years	Team	Apps	(Gls)
2009–2020	Medellín	201	(6)
2012	→ FC Dallas (loan)	30	(1)

International career
2009	Colombia U20	8	(3)
- * Club domestic league appearances and goals as of 15:56, 25 October 2020 (UTC)

Hernán Enrique Pertúz Ortega (born March 31, 1989) is a Colombian footballer who currently plays as a defender for Cucuta Deportivo.

== Club career ==
Pertúz began his career in the youth ranks of top Colombian club Independiente Medellín. He made his first team debut on November 27, 2011, in a 3–4 loss to Once Caldas. During the 2009 season Pertúz helped Medellín to a first-place finish in the Torneo Finalización and a Copa Mustang II title. On January 3, 2011, Pertúz signed with FC Dallas of Major League Soccer.

On December 20, 2012, after making 30 appearances and scoring one goal in what turned out to be his loan stint with Dallas, it was announced that Pertúz had not come into terms with Dallas and would be returning to Independiente. After a spinal injury in June 2018, Pertúz was out for a year and one week. In May 2020 the club confirmed, that Partúz wouldn't get his contract extended and would leave the club on 30 June 2020.

== International career ==
Hernán Pertúz was a member of the Colombia national under-20 football team that participated in the 2009 South American Youth Championship. He was a key player for the side scoring three goals in the competition.

== Career statistics ==
Appearances and goals by club, season and competition
Club	Season	League		Cup		Continental		Total	
Club	Season	Apps	Goals	Apps	Goals	Apps	Goals	Apps	Goals
Medellín	2008	5	0	5	1	-		10	1
Medellín	2009	10	1	1	1	0	0	11	2
Medellín	2010	23	0	6	0	1	0	30	0
Medellín	2011	19	1	4	0	-		23	1
FC Dallas	2012	30	1	-		-		30	1
Medellín	2013	19	0	4	0	-		23	0
Medellín	2014	19	1	4	1	-		23	2
Medellín	2015	23	0	2	0	-		25	0
Medellín	2016	28	0	5	0	5	0	38	0
Medellín	2017	18	2	5	0	4	0	27	2
Medellín	2018	39	1	1	0	2	1	42	2
Medellín	2019	2	0	0	0	-		2	0
Medellín	2020	1	0	-		-		1	0
Medellín	Total	206	6	37	3	12	1	255	10
Career total		236	7	37	3	12	1	285	11
