= Seba (surname) =

Seba is the surname of:

- Albertus Seba (1665 – 1736), Dutch pharmacist, zoologist and collector
- Cesar Augusto Seba, Brazilian former basketball player, member of the 1967 world bronze medal team
- Jun Seba (1974 – 2010), Japanese DJ/Musician. His stage name "Nujabes" being an anadrome of his real name when ordered as is common in Japan
- Jesús Seba (born 1974), Spanish retired footballer
- Süleyman Seba (1926 – 2014), Turkish retired footballer
