= Steven Zamora =

Ecuadorian footballer (born 1989)

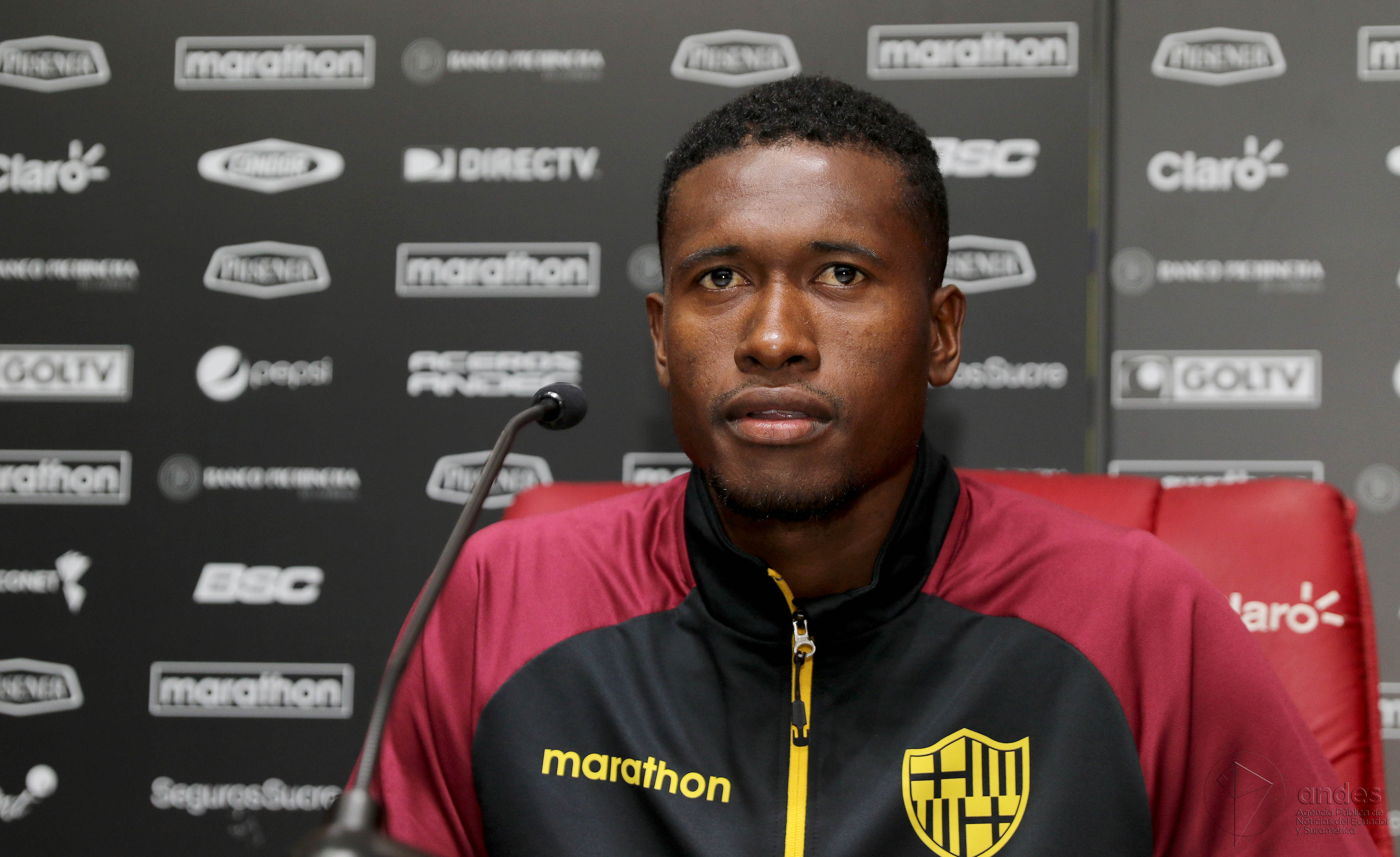

Personal information
- Full name: Steven Yilmar Zamora Palomino
- Date of birth: 20 August 1989 (age 37)
- Place of birth: Guayaquil, Guayas, Ecuador
- Position: Center midfielder

Team information
- Current team: C.D. El Nacional

Youth career
- 2007–2008: Azogues

Senior career*
Years	Team	Apps	(Gls)
2009–2010	Macará	6	(0)
2010–2013	Independiente del Valle	48	(0)
2013	L.D.U. Portoviejo	0	(0)
2014	Macará	0	(0)
2015–	Fuerza Amarilla	33	(2)
2018	→ Barcelona S.C. (loan)	11	(1)
2019–	→ C.D. El Nacional (loan)	1	(0)
- * Club domestic league appearances and goals as of 17 October 2009 ‡ National team caps and goals as of 17 October 2009

Steven Yilmar Zamora Palomino (born August 20, 1989) is an Ecuadorian footballer who plays for C.D. El Nacional.

== Club career ==
Zamora's career started when he played for Azogues in youth level. After Azogues' disappointing 2008 season, they were relegated to the Serie B of Ecuador with Zamora not even playing one game for the first team.

On July 14, 2009, Zamora signed with Macará on loan until the end of the season. His debut game came against Barcelona in his team's 3–1 loss.

== International career ==
Zamora played in the Ecuador U-20 team for the 2009 South American Youth Championship in Venezuela.
