= Eduardo Bone =

Ecuadorian footballer (born 1990)

Eduardo Boné
Personal information
- Full name: Eduardo Andrés Boné Saá
- Date of birth: February 22, 1990 (age 36)
- Place of birth: Esmeraldas, Ecuador
- Position: Midfielder

Team information
- Current team: Mushuc Runa

Youth career
- 2004–2006: Barcelona
- 2007–2009: LDU Quito

Senior career*
| Years | Team | Apps | (Gls) |
| 2008–2012 | LDU Quito | 5 | (0) |
| 2010 | → UT Equinoccial (loan) | 34 | (7) |
| 2011 | → Macará (loan) | 32 | (5) |
| 2012 | UT Equinoccial | 16 | (5) |
| 2012 | Macará | 13 | (1) |
| 2013 | Aucas | 19 | (0) |
| 2014 | Patria | 13 | (5) |
| 2015 | Clan Juvenil | 32 | (11) |
| 2016 | Patria | 13 | (3) |
| 2016 | ESPOLI | 16 | (5) |
| 2017– | Mushuc Runa | 6 | (0) |

International career
- Ecuador U-20
Medal record
Representing Ecuador
Men's Football
Pan American Games
| Gold medal – first place | 2007 Rio de Janeiro | Team competition |
- * Club domestic league appearances and goals as of July 29, 2017

Eduardo Andrés Boné Saá (born February 22, 1990, in Esmeraldas) is an Ecuadorian footballer who plays for Mushuc Runa.

== Honors ==
=== National team ===
- Ecuador U-20
  - Pan American Games: Gold Medal
