= Máximo Banguera =

Ecuadorian footballer (born 1985)

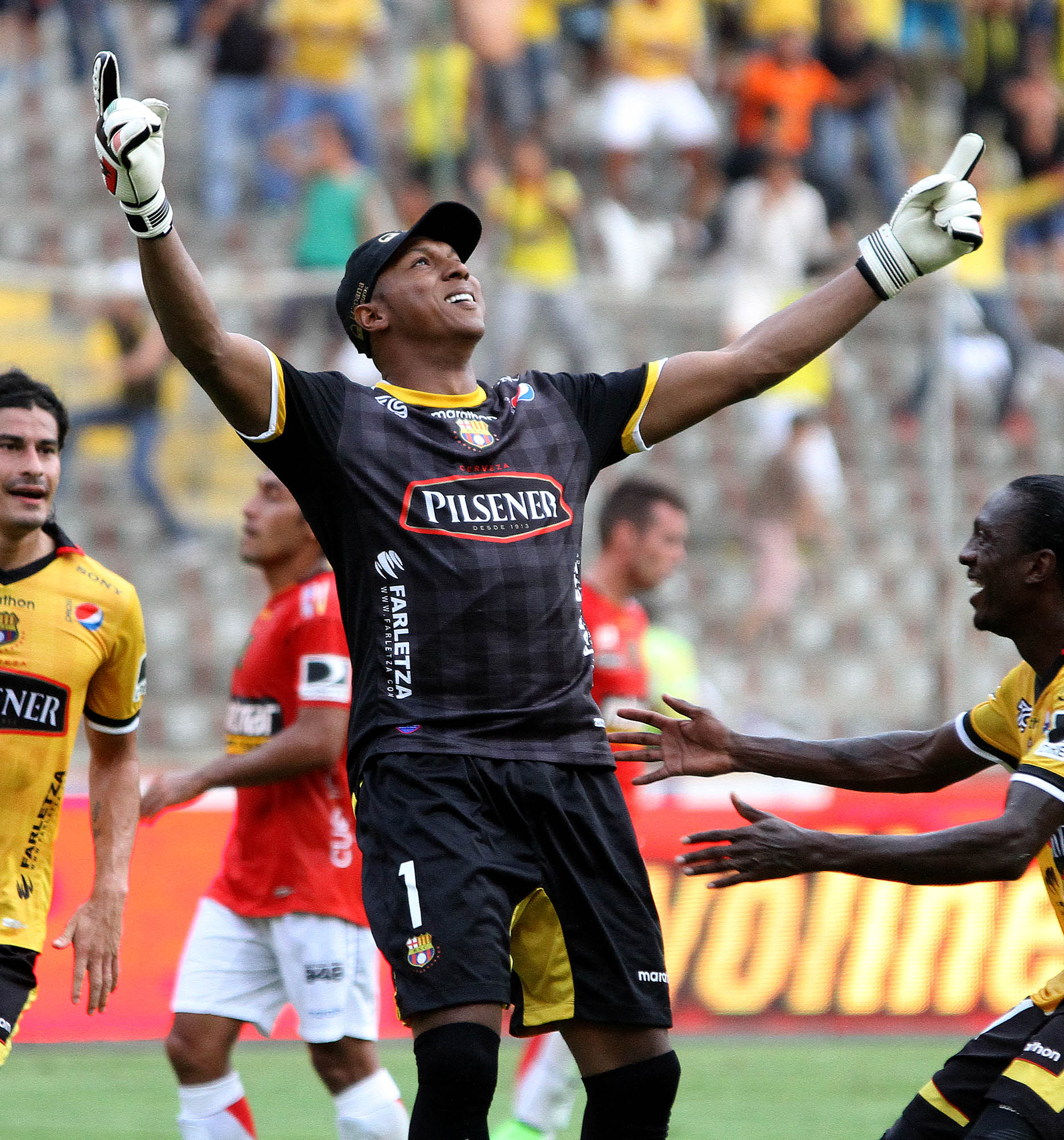
- Banguera with Barcelona in 2014

Personal information
- Full name: Máximo Orlando Banguera Valdivieso
- Date of birth: 16 December 1985 (age 40)
- Place of birth: Guayaquil, Ecuador
- Height: 1.87 m (6 ft 2 in)
- Position: Goalkeeper

Youth career
- 2003–2004: ESPOLI

Senior career*
Years	Team	Apps	(Gls)
2004–2008	ESPOLI	118	(0)
2009–2019	Barcelona	403	(4)
2020	El Nacional	0	(0)
2020–2023	Delfín	35	(0)
2021	→ Guayaquil City (loan)	18	(0)
2023	Naranja Mekánica	0	(0)

International career^{‡}
2008–2019	Ecuador	36	(0)
Medal record
Men's Football
Representing Ecuador
Pan American Games
Gold medal – first place	2007 Brazil	Team
- * Club domestic league appearances and goals as of 10 August 2019 ‡ National team caps and goals as of 26 March 2019

Máximo Orlando Banguera Valdivieso (born 16 December 1985) is an Ecuadorian former professional footballer who played as a goalkeeper.

== Club career ==
Banguera attracted attention early in his career while playing for ESPOLI in the Ecuadorian Serie B. He then played with Ecuadorian Serie A side Barcelona from 2009 to 2019, making over 400 appearances and winning league titles in 2012 and 2016.

Banguera signed with El Nacional ahead of the 2020 season after 10 years with Barcelona. However, he failed to make an appearance for the club and served as a backup to Johan Padilla. Banguera joined Delfín in September of that year.

In September 2022, Banguera was given a three-game suspension for a physical altercation with Mushuc Runa player Franklin Carabalí.

== International career ==
Bannguera won a gold medal with Ecuador at the 2007 Pan American Games.

Banguera was called up to play against Mexico in November 2008. He played all of the ninety minutes and performed well.

After Marcelo Elizaga's retirement following the 2011 Copa América, Banguera was consolidated as the first choice Goalkeeper for Ecuador. Due to injuries, he was only able to start a few games at the 2014 FIFA World Cup Qualifiers. Eventually losing his starting spot to Velez Sarfield's Alexander Domínguez.

Due to his declining performances even before the 2014 FIFA World Cup, he was eventually replaced by Ecuadorian-naturalized Goalkeepers, Librado Azcona and Esteban Dreer. Subsequently, Banguera was left out of the 2015 Copa América squad.

== Career statistics ==
As of match played 24 May 2019

Club	Season	League		Cup		Continental		Total	
Club	Season	Apps	Goals	Apps	Goals	Apps	Goals	Apps	Goals
ESPOLI
ESPOLI	2005	32	0	-		-		32	0
ESPOLI	2006	23	0	-		-		23	0
ESPOLI	2007	37	0	-		-		37	0
ESPOLI	2008	26	0	-		-		26	0
ESPOLI	Total	118	0	-		-		118	0
Barcelona
Barcelona	2009	33	0	-		-		33	0
Barcelona	2010	41	1	-		4	0	45	1
Barcelona	2011	39	0	-		-		39	0
Barcelona	2012	33	1	-		6	0	39	1
Barcelona	2013	39	0	-		5	0	44	0
Barcelona	2014	41	1	-		-		41	1
Barcelona	2015	39	0	-		6	0	45	0
Barcelona	2016	41	1	-		2	0	43	1
Barcelona	2017	40	0	-		12	0	52	0
Barcelona	2018	43	0	-		1	0	44	0
Barcelona	2019	14	0	-		-		14	0
Barcelona	Total	403	4	-		36	0	439	4
Total		521	4	-		36	0	557	4

== Honours ==
=== Club ===
Barcelona

- Serie A: 2012, 2016

=== National ===
- Pan American Games: 2007

== Personal life ==
Banguera is the uncle of AFC Bournemouth youth players Malcom and Michael Dacosta.
