= Miécimo da Silva Sports Complex =

Multi-sport complex in Rio

Coordinates: 22°58′31″S 43°23′25″W

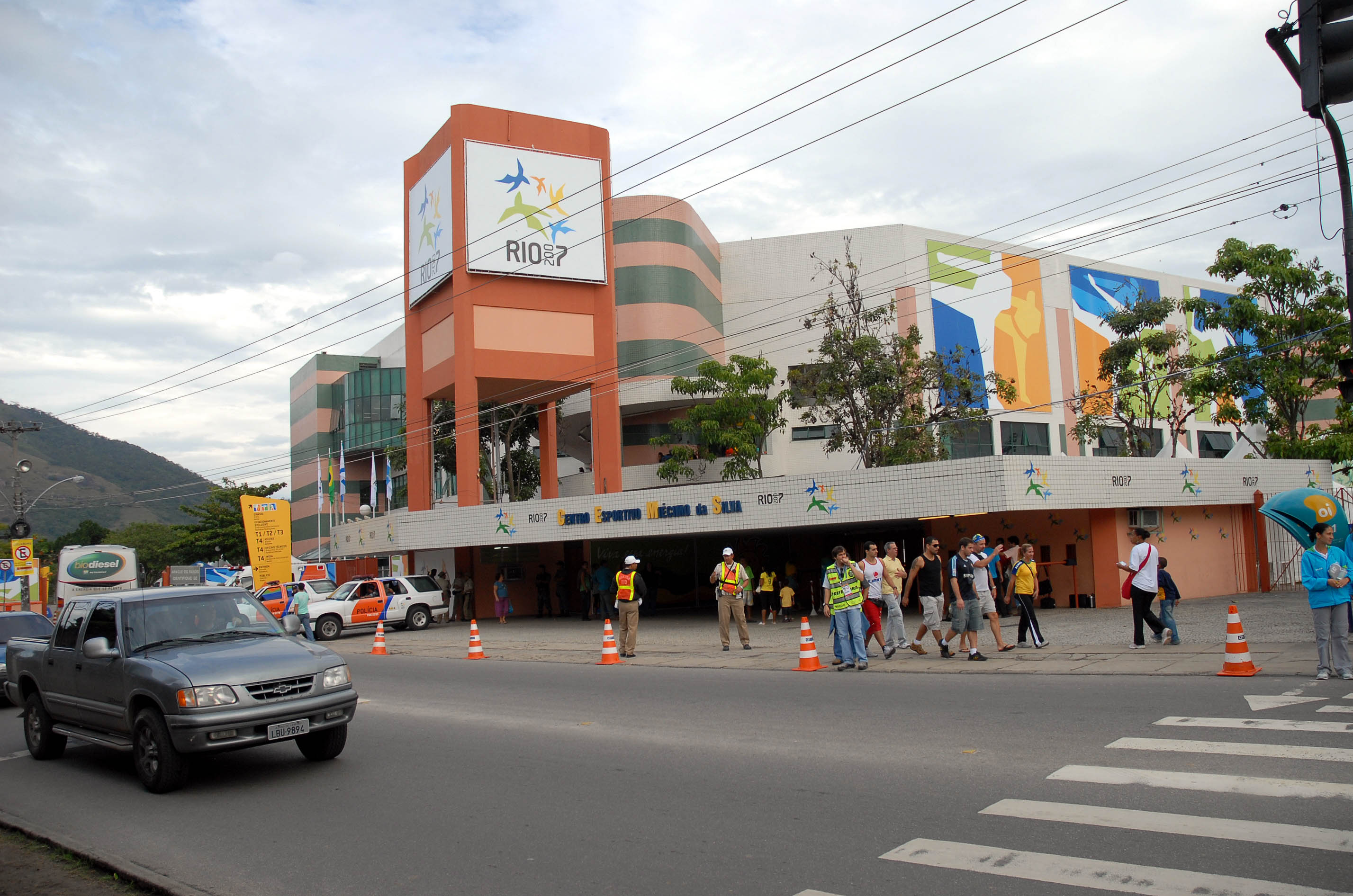
Miécimo da Silva Sports Complex

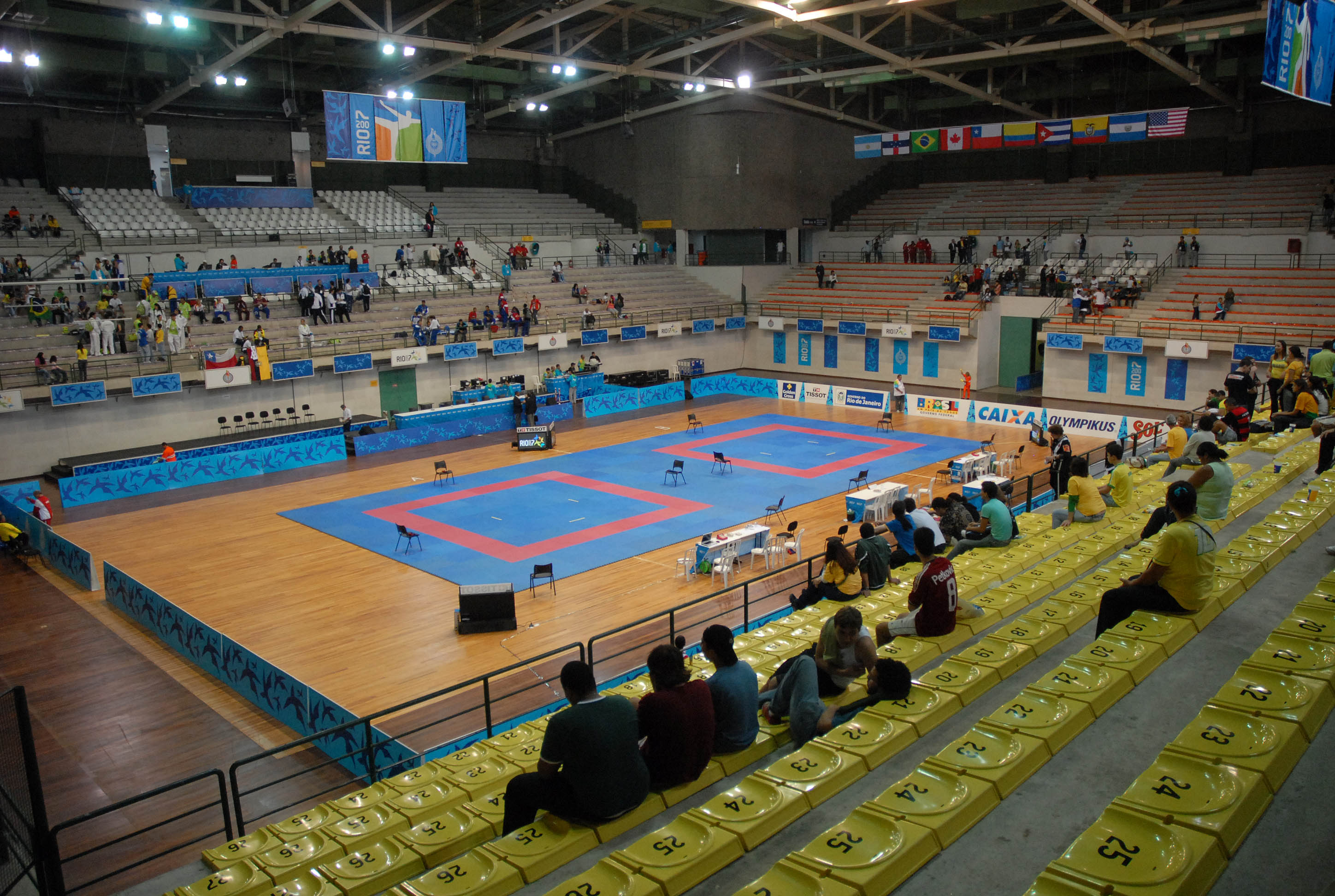
Pan American Games 2007 in Miécimo da Silva.

The Miécimo da Silva Olympic Boulevard, originally Miécimo da Silva Sports Center (in Portuguese: "Centro Esportivo Miécimo da Silva"), is a city-owned Olympic-grade multi-sports complex in Campo Grande, Rio de Janeiro. Sporting swimming pools, multi-sport building complex, an indoor arena, a small stadium, and over 9 outdoor sports fields, Miécimo is one of the largest sports centers in Latin America.

Since its opening in 1982, the center has been host to several events, including the 2007 Pan American Games and the 2016 Summer Olympics mega events, as well as tournaments, concerts, Sports Days, summer camps, talent shows and other small and large cultural and religious events.

Along with hosting events, the center also offers its spaces to the community for practice and leisure at no cost. They also offer classes to the general public as well as special classes for kids, elders and people with disabilities, also free of charge.

Classes include: swimming, water polo, hydrogymnastics, stretching, Yoga, Pilates, Functional training, HIIT, step aerobics, rebound with trampolines, artistic gymnastics, rhythmic gymnastics, Ballet, Jazz dance, tap dance, ballroom dance, "Rhythms" (Zumba, FitDance and Ritbox), Capoeira, Brazilian jiu-jitsu, Karate, Judo, Taekwondo, Muay Thai, Boxing, Athletics, Association football, Flag football, Futsal, Handball, Basketball, Volleyball, Tennis, Badminton and Table tennis, among others.
