= Cristian Mejía =

Colombian footballer (born 1990)

Personal information
- Full name: Cristian de Jesús Mejía Martínez
- Date of birth: 11 October 1990 (age 36)
- Place of birth: Barranquilla, Colombia
- Height: 1.67 m (5 ft 6 in)
- Positions: Attacking midfielder; striker

Senior career*
Years	Team	Apps	(Gls)
2008–2009	Deportes Tolima	14	(1)
2009–2010	Politehnica Timișoara	6	(0)
2010	Peñarol	14	(2)
2011	Danubio	7	(0)
2011	Atlético Junior	7	(0)
2012–2013	Envigado	10	(0)
2013	Estudiantes Tecos	8	(1)
2013–2014	Atlético Huila	22	(0)
2014	Alebrijes de Oaxaca	6	(0)
2015	Uniautónoma	19	(1)
2016–2019	Deportivo Pereira	113	(8)
Total		226	(13)

International career^{‡}
2009	Colombia U20	7	(0)
- * Club domestic league appearances and goals as of 17 October 2021 ‡ National team caps and goals as of 12 October 2015

Cristian de Jesús Mejía Martínez (born 11 October 1990, in Barranquilla) is a former Colombian football midfielder.

== Honours ==
Atlético Junior

- Categoría Primera A: 2011–II
