= Pablo Camacho =

Venezuelan footballer (born 1990)

Personal information
- Full name: Pablo Jesús Camacho Figueira
- Date of birth: December 12, 1990 (age 35)
- Place of birth: Caracas, Venezuela
- Height: 1.78 m (5 ft 10 in)
- Position: Right back

Team information
- Current team: Deportivo Táchira
- Number: 13

Senior career*
Years	Team	Apps	(Gls)
2007–2012	Caracas	26	(1)
2008–2009	→ Deportivo Italia (loan)	18	(0)
2009–2010	→ Espanyol B (loan)	0	(0)
2012–2013	Aragua	17	(0)
2013–2014	Deportivo Anzoategui	8	(0)
2014–2015	Deportivo La Guaira	12	(0)
2015–	Deportivo Táchira	214	(6)
2018	Lincoln Red Imps (loan)	13	(0)

International career^{‡}
2007–2009	Venezuela U-20	14	(1)
2009–	Venezuela	5	(0)
- * Club domestic league appearances and goals as of 10 March 2026 ‡ National team caps and goals as of 17:03, 04 June 2017

Pablo Jesús Camacho Figueira (born 12 December 1990) is a Venezuelan footballer who plays for Deportivo Táchira and Venezuela national football team.

== Career ==
Camacho began his career with Deportivo Italia and signed in May 2009 with FC Caracas, before moved on 13 June 2009 to R.C.D. Espanyol the Venezuelan defender joined on loan from FC Caracas, the loan deal runs between 30 June 2010.

== International career ==
Camacho is also member of the Venezuela national under-20 football team and was presented in his homeland at 2009 FIFA U-20 World Cup in Egypt.
