= Iván Bella =

Argentine footballer

Personal information
- Full name: Iván Gonzalo Bella
- Date of birth: September 13, 1989 (age 37)
- Place of birth: Buenos Aires, Argentina
- Height: 1.79 m (5 ft 10 in)
- Position: Winger

Team information
- Current team: Gimnasia Jujuy

Youth career
- Vélez Sársfield

Senior career*
Years	Team	Apps	(Gls)
2008–2013	Vélez Sársfield	99	(7)
2013–2015	Chiapas	1	(0)
2014	→ Puebla (loan)	5	(0)
2014	→ Lanús (loan)	6	(0)
2015	→ Godoy Cruz (loan)	9	(0)
2015–2017	Vélez Sársfield	13	(0)
2017–2018	Arsenal de Sarandí	3	(0)
2018–2019	Santamarina	17	(1)
2020–	Gimnasia Jujuy	5	(0)

International career
2009	Argentina U-20	8	(1)
- * Club domestic league appearances and goals as of 21:34, 9 June 2020 (UTC)

Iván Gonzalo Bella (born 13 September 1989) is an Argentine football winger who plays for Gimnasia Jujuy.

== Club career ==
Bella made his league debut for Vélez Sársfield on a 0–0 draw against Independiente on 8 June 2008, during the penultimate fixture of that year's Clausura tournament. In 2009, the Argentine winger won with Vélez the 2009 Clausura, although only playing one game (a 1–1 draw against River Plate on the sixth fixture).

Bella played 13 games in Vélez' 2010 Apertura runner-up campaign, mainly replacing Augusto Fernández on the right wing when the former was injured. However, coach Ricardo Gareca also used him as a left back to replace injured Emiliano Papa on the last fixtures of the tournament. Bella improved his goal-scoring ability in the first semester of 2012, scoring five times in 18 games between the 2012 Clausura and Copa Libertadores.

Upon Augusto Fernández's departure from Vélez, Bella became a regular starter for Vélez and played 15 games (scoring once) in the team's 2012 Inicial title-winning campaign. In 2013, the winger suffered an epilepsy seizure on the field, but quickly recovered and started for Vélez in the 2012–13 Superfinal victory against Newell's Old Boys.

In July 2013, Bella moved to Mexican club Chiapas F.C., that purchased 50% of his transfer rights from Vélez for a fee of approximately US$2 million. After a six-month period, he joined Puebla F.C. on loan.

In July 2014, Bella returned to Argentina for Lanús, signed a one-and-a-half-year deal. However, the midfielder left the club after only six months, joining Godoy Cruz for the 2015 Argentine Primera División.

After another 6-month period with Godoy Cruz, the winger returned to his first team, Vélez Sarsfield, signing a two-year contract. In Vélez' first team he joined his brother Rodrigo.

== International career ==
In January 2009, Bella played the South American Youth Championship with the Argentine under-20 national team. In 2012, Bella was called by coach Alejandro Sabella for a senior national team formed solely by local league players, although he did not play any games.

== Honours ==
Vélez Sársfield

- Argentine Primera División (4): 2009 Clausura, 2011 Clausura, 2012 Inicial, 2012–13 Superfinal
