= Hamilton Chasi =

Ecuadorian footballer (born 1990)

Personal information
- Full name: Hamilton Chasi Guerrero
- Date of birth: 12 February 1990 (age 36)
- Place of birth: Ecuador
- Position: Wing back

Team information
- Current team: Barcelona SC

Senior career*
Years	Team	Apps	(Gls)
2007	Macará	5	(0)
2008	Deportivo Cuenca (loan)	0	(0)
2009	Macará (loan)		
2010–present	→ Barcelona SC (loan)		

International career^{‡}
2007–	Ecuador U-20	10	(1)
- * Club domestic league appearances and goals as of 4 February 2009 ‡ National team caps and goals as of 4 February 2009

Hamilton Chasi Guerrero (born 12 February 1990) is an Ecuadorian footballer currently playing for Barcelona SC.

== International career ==
Chasi played for the under 20 Ecuador national football team since 2007. He was a starter and he helped Ecuador win the 2007 Pan American Games. He also participated in the 2009 South American Youth Championship, where Ecuador was eliminated in the group stage, because of loss in a coin toss decider.

== Honours ==
=== National team ===
- Ecuador U-20
  - Pan American Games: Gold Medal
