= Deison Méndez =

Ecuadorian footballer (born 1990)

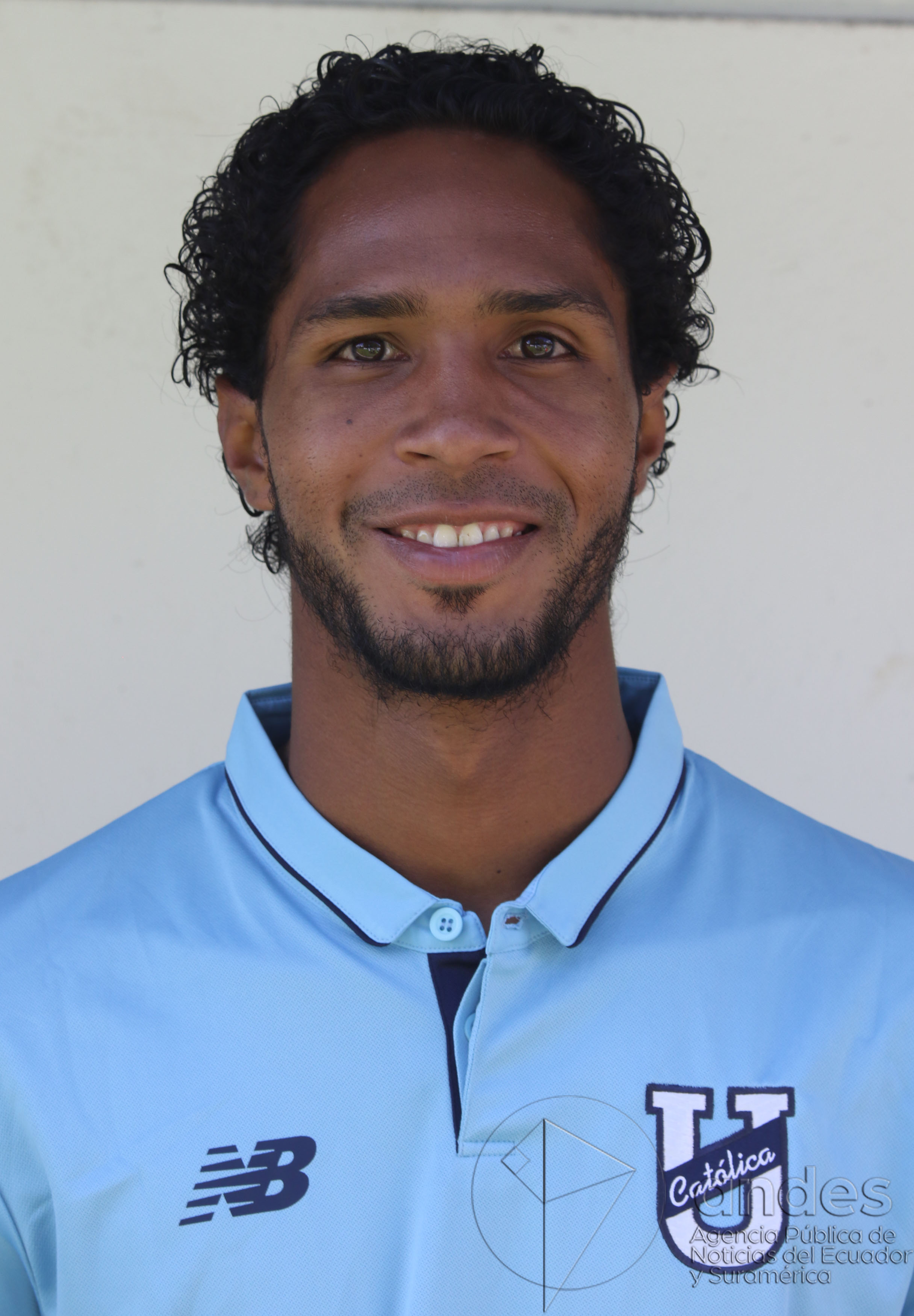

Personal information
- Full name: Deison Adolfo Méndez Rosero
- Date of birth: 27 October 1990 (age 36)
- Place of birth: Muisne, Ecuador
- Height: 1.85 m (6 ft 1 in)
- Position: Central defender

Team information
- Current team: Juventud Minerva

Youth career
- 2004–2008: Liga de Quito

Senior career*
| Years | Team | Apps | (Gls) |
| 2009 | Espoli | 16 | (0) |
| 2010–2011 | Emelec | 4 | (0) |
| 2013–2015 | Deportivo Cuenca | 0 | (0) |
| 2016–2017 | Universidad Católica del Ecuador | 0 | (0) |
| 2018 | Olmedo | 3 | (0) |
| 2019–2020 | Mushuc Runa | 11 | (0) |
- * Club domestic league appearances and goals as of 31 December 2009

Deison Adolfo Méndez Rosero (born 27 October 1990) is an Ecuadorian footballer who plays for CD Juventud and the Ecuador national football team.

== Club career ==
Méndez started out at LDU Quito. There, he has attracted interest from European teams like PSV Eindhoven, Ajax, Internazionale, and Sampdoria. In 2006, he was on trial with Inter. Inter had the intentions of signing him but Méndez did not have Italian citizenship. Within the 09 campaign of Ecuadoran football, Mendez played for Espoli. In 2010, he signed for Emelec.

== International career ==
Méndez was called up to play in the 2007 Pan American Games with Ecuador. He will be called up to play the 2009 South American Youth Championship in Venezuela. On 10 February 2009 Méndez made his first full international appearance for Ecuador starting and playing the entire 90 minutes against England's U-21.

== Honours ==
=== National team ===
- Ecuador U-20
  - Pan American Games: Gold Medal
