= Gustavo Cristaldo =

Paraguayan footballer (born 1989)

Personal information
- Full name: Gustavo Alberto Cristaldo Brítez
- Date of birth: 1 May 1989 (age 37)
- Place of birth: Caacupé, Paraguay
- Height: 1.69 m (5 ft 7 in)
- Position: Midfielder

Team information
- Current team: Independiente Petrolero
- Number: 19

Youth career
- Libertad

Senior career*
Years	Team	Apps	(Gls)
2009–2010	Libertad	10	(0)
2010	Sol de América	18	(2)
2011	Rubio Ñu	20	(2)
2011	Sportivo Luqueño	16	(0)
2012	Nacional	9	(5)
2012	Libertad	7	(1)
2013	Nacional	30	(1)
2014–2015	Cobreloa	45	(8)
2015–2016	U. de Concepción	11	(0)
2016	→ River Plate (loan)	10	(3)
2017	Libertad	5	(0)
2018–2019	Deportivo Santaní	31	(4)
2019	Fuerza Amarilla	15	(0)
2019–2020	General Díaz	25	(3)
2021	Independiente Petrolero	27	(6)
2022	Always Ready	39	(7)
2023–2024	Nacional Potosí	36	(4)
2024–	Independiente Petrolero	51	(8)

International career
2009	Paraguay U-20		
2011	Paraguay	1	(0)
- * Club domestic league appearances and goals as of 30 December 2025

Gustavo Alberto Cristaldo Brítez (born 31 May 1989) is a Paraguayan international footballer who plays for Independiente Petrolero, as a midfielder.

== Career ==
Cristaldo has played for Libertad, Sol de América and Rubio Ñu.

He made his international debut for Paraguay in 2011, and participated at the 2009 FIFA U-20 World Cup.
