= Marcelo Benítez (footballer, born 1989) =

Argentine footballer

Personal information
- Full name: Marcelo Fabián Benítez
- Date of birth: 29 May 1989 (age 37)
- Place of birth: Santa Fe, Argentina
- Height: 1.77 m (5 ft 9 1/2 in)
- Position: Midfielder

Team information
- Current team: Gimnasia Concepción

Senior career*
Years	Team	Apps	(Gls)
2008–2010	Lanús	0	(0)
2010	Real Zaragoza B	12	(0)
2011	General Lamadrid	6	(0)
2011–2013	Real Zaragoza B	29	(0)
2013–2014	Deportivo Armenio	18	(0)
2014–2015	Tiro Federal	12	(0)
2015–2016	Talleres	3	(0)
2016–2020	Atlético Camioneros	62	(2)
2020	Racing de Córdoba	3	(0)
2021	Fénix de Pilar	8	(0)
2021	Ciudad de Bolívar	18	(0)
2022–	Gimnasia Concepción	2	(0)

International career
2009	Argentina U20	5	(1)
- * Club domestic league appearances and goals as of 14:56, 24 April 2022 (UTC)

Marcelo Fabián Benítez (born 29 May 1989) is an Argentine footballer who plays as a midfielder for Gimnasia Concepción.

== Club career ==
Benítez started his career with Argentine Primera División side Lanús in 2008, but left two years later without featuring. In 2010, Benítez joined Spanish club Real Zaragoza B. He made forty-one appearances, including twenty-nine in the 2011–12 Segunda División B season, either side of a spell back in Argentina with General Lamadrid. He left Zaragoza in June 2013 to join Deportivo Armenio of Primera B Metropolitana. His first appearance came on 18 September in a draw against Deportivo Merlo. He played eighteen times for the club. On 28 August 2014, Benítez joined Torneo Federal A club Tiro Federal.

Twelve appearances followed for Tiro Federal during the 2014 campaign. He subsequently joined fellow Torneo Federal A outfit Talleres in January 2015. Benítez played a total of three times for Talleres in 2015, which included a red card in his second match versus Juventud Unida Universitario. Talleres won the league title that season which secured promotion to Primera B Nacional. Benítez was let go to join Atlético Camioneros of Torneo Federal B soon after. They won promotion to Torneo Federal A in 2017. He stayed for two more seasons, scoring his first tier three goal on 6 October 2019 versus Sportivo Desamparados.

On 21 August 2020, Benítez signed for Torneo Regional Federal Amateur team Racing de Córdoba. However, on 9 September, Benítez joined Primera B Metropolitana's Fénix due to uncertainty of the fourth tier caused by the COVID-19 pandemic.

== International career ==
He played five times and scored one goal for the Argentina U20 team at the 2009 South American U-20 Championship, with the goal coming in a final stage draw with Venezuela.

== Career statistics ==
As of 7 October 2020.

Appearances and goals by club, season and competition
Club	Season	League			Cup		League Cup		Continental		Other		Total	
Club	Season	Division	Apps	Goals	Apps	Goals	Apps	Goals	Apps	Goals	Apps	Goals	Apps	Goals
Racing de Córdoba	2020	Torneo Amateur	0	0	0	0	—		—		0	0	0	0
Fénix	2020–21	Primera B Metropolitana	0	0	0	0	—		—		0	0	0	0
Career total			0	0	0	0	—		—		0	0	0	0

== Honours ==
Talleres

- Torneo Federal A: 2015
