= Estadio Monumental de Maturín =

Stadium in Maturín, Venezuela

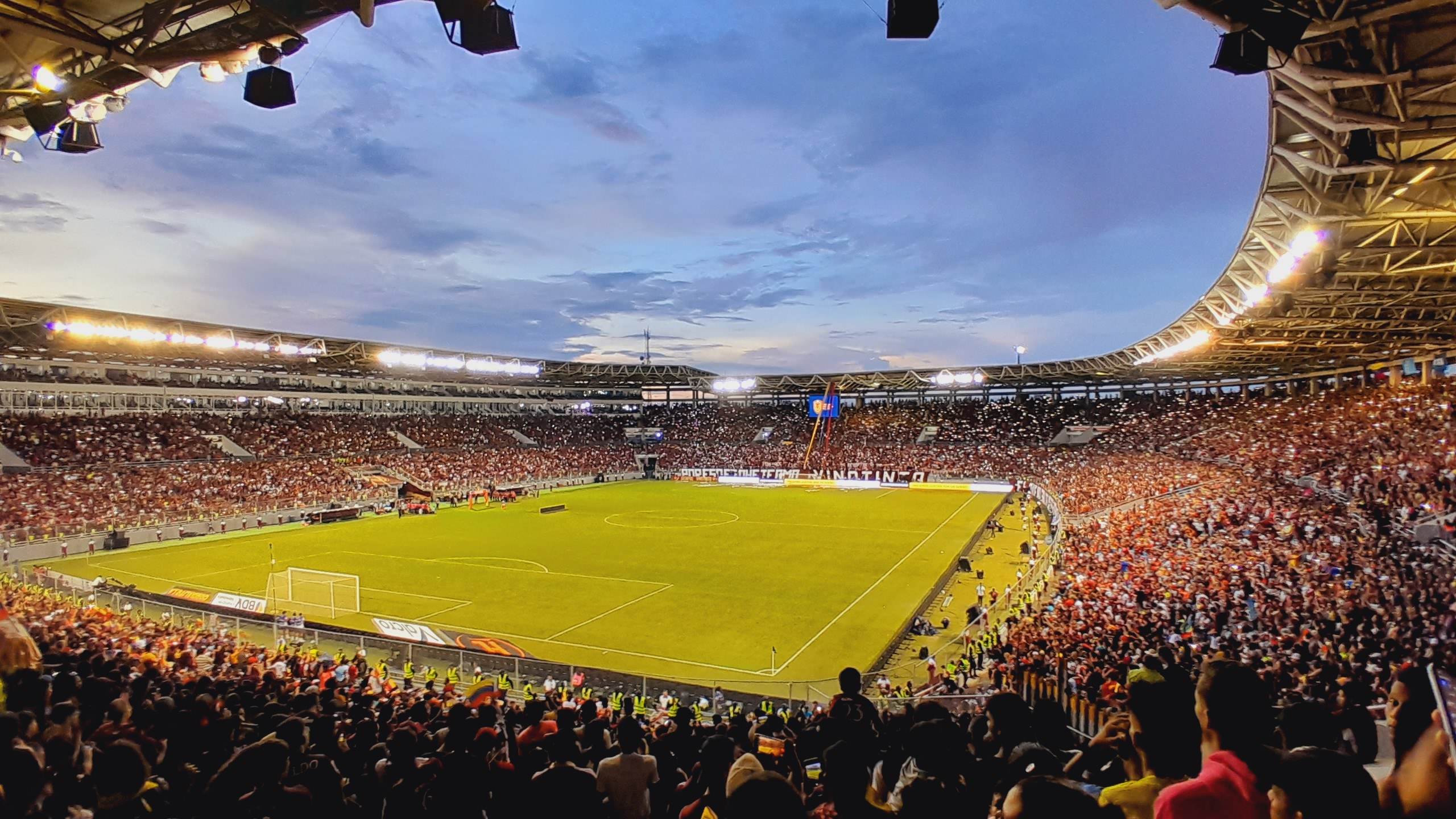
- Interactive map of Estadio Monumental de Maturín
- Location: Maturín, Venezuela
- Coordinates: 9.709933341820792°N 63.2677446053749°W
- Operator: Monagas Sport Club
- Capacity: 52,000

Construction
- Opened: 2007
- Cost: US$85 million

Tenant
- Monagas S.C. (2007–present)

The Estadio Monumental de Maturín (Monumental Stadium of Maturin) is the largest stadium in Venezuela by seating capacity, with 52,000 spectators. It was one of the venues of the 2007 Copa America. It is also the home stadium of the Monagas Sport Club.

It is located in the Industrial Zone of Maturin.

== Capacity ==
The entire stadium is covered with individual seating. It has a parking for 3,786 vehicles, a commercial area of 26,381 square metres, 44 radio booths, 8 television studios, suites and presidential box, delegates' lounge, anti doping control room and press room, three elevators, a parking only authorities and players, two dressing rooms, dressing and locker rooms for referees for the security forces, ballboys and musical band.

Their positions are distributed as follows:

- Western Sector: 8,116
- Western Sector 3 Left: 2,977
- Western Sector 3 Right: 2,966
- North Sector: 7,719
- South Sector: 7,719
- Eastern Sector: 11,389
- Eastern Sector 3 Left: 3,892
- Eastern Sector 3 Right: 3,891

Total laid down: 48,669

- Written press: 506
- Radio and TV booths: 300
- Suite level 1: 560
- Suite level 2: 1,337
- Presidential box: 220
- Disabled: 204

Total capacity of this stadium: 52,000

== Copa América 2007 ==
The stadium was one of the venues of the Copa América 2007, and held the following matches:

Date	Time(EDT)	Team #1	Res.	Team #2	Round
2007-07-01	16.00	Brazil	3-0	Chile	Group B
2007-07-01	18.15	Mexico	2-1	Ecuador	Group B
2007-07-08	16.00	Mexico	6-0	Paraguay	Quarter Finals
