= UTC−04:30 =

Time zone

- Time zone
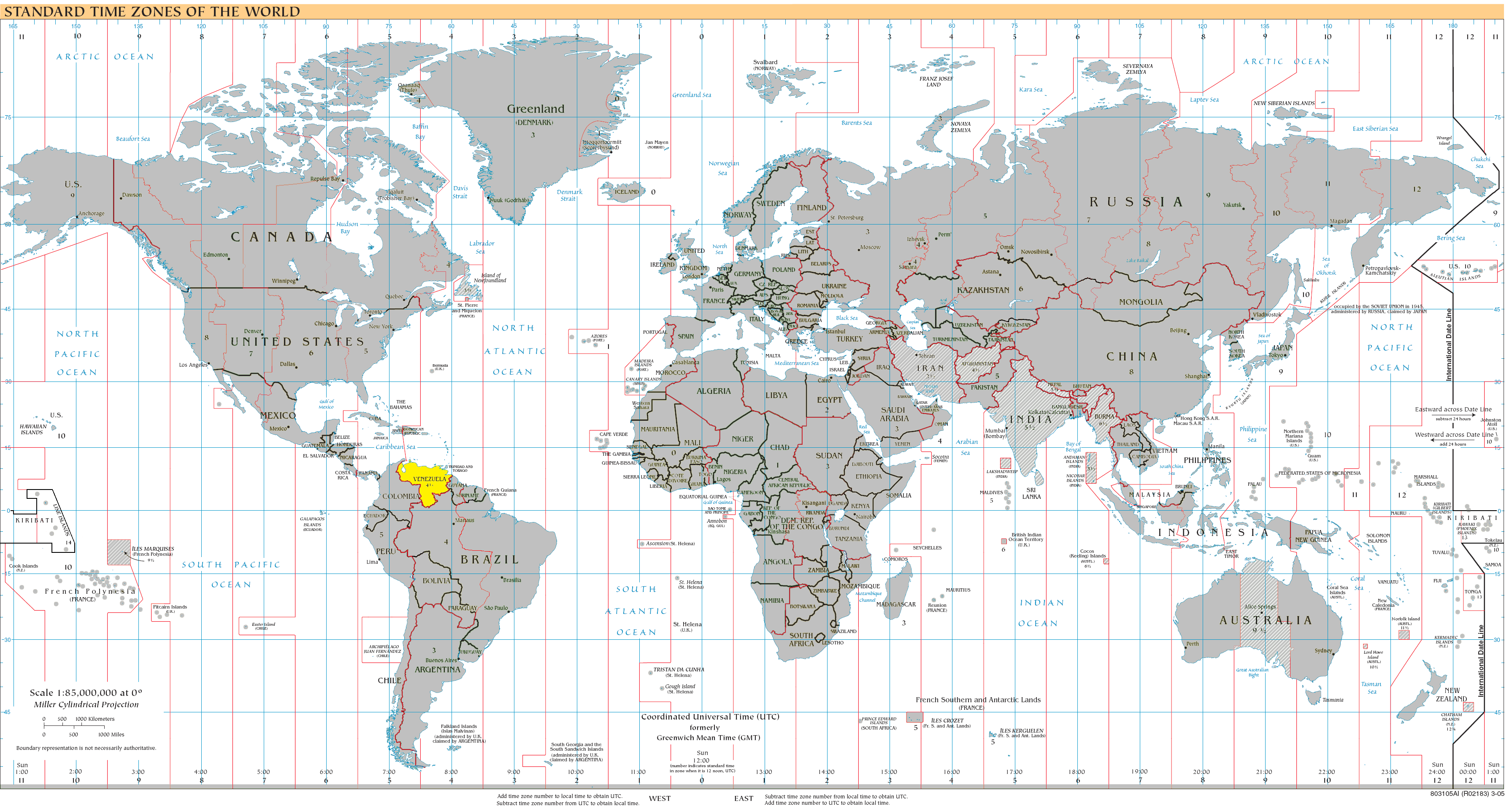
- World map with the time zone highlighted

UTC offset
- UTC: UTC−04:30

Current time
- 12:46, 22 March 2026 UTC−04:30 [refresh]

Central meridian
- 67.5 degrees W

UTC−04:30 is an identifier for a time offset from UTC of −04:30.

== History ==
It was used only in Venezuela, first between February 12, 1912, and January 1, 1965, and again from December 9, 2007 to May 1, 2016. Currently, Venezuela's time zone is UTC−04:00.

== See also ==
- Time in Venezuela
