= 2009 South American U-20 Championship =

2009 Sudamericano Sub-20

Tournament details
- Host country: Venezuela
- Dates: 19 January – 8 February
- Teams: 10 (from 1 confederation)
- Venue: 3 (in 3 host cities)

Final positions
- Champions: Brazil (10th title)
- Runners-up: Paraguay
- Third place: Uruguay
- Fourth place: Venezuela

Tournament statistics
- Matches played: 35
- Goals scored: 101 (2.89 per match)
- Top scorer(s): (Brazil) Walter (Paraguay) Robin Ramírez (Paraguay) Hernán Pérez (Uruguay) Abel Hernández (5 goals)

The 2009 South American Youth Championship (Sudamericano sub-20) was a football competition for national teams U-20 who are associated with the football federation CONMEBOL. It was the 24th time the tournament was held and took place in Venezuela from 19 January to 8 February. It also served as qualification for the 2009 FIFA U-20 World Cup. Brazil won the tournament, becoming champions for the tenth time.

The tournament was initially hosted in Peru, however following FIFA sanctions over Peruvian Government's investigation of the FPF's corruption, it was moved to Venezuela.

== Teams ==
- Argentina
- Bolivia
- Brazil
- Chile
- Colombia
- Ecuador
- Paraguay
- Peru
- Uruguay
- Venezuela (host)

== First Group Stage ==
=== Group A ===
Team	Pld	W	D	L	GF	GA	GD	Pts
Venezuela	4	1	3	0	5	3	+2	6
Argentina	4	1	3	0	7	6	+1	6
Colombia*	4	1	3	0	4	3	+1	6
Ecuador	4	1	3	0	4	3	+1	6
Peru	4	0	0	4	3	8	-5	0

(*) Colombia qualified to the following round after winning a coin toss

==== Match schedule ====
2009-01-19
18:00 UTC-4:30

Peru	1 – 2	Ecuador
Barros 28' (pen.)	Report	Rojas 4', 22'

Estadio Monumental de Maturín, Maturín
Attendance: 30,000
Referee: Líber Prudente (Uruguay)

2009-01-19
20:00 UTC-4:30

Venezuela	1 – 1	Argentina
Rondón 2'	Report	Salvio 23'

Estadio Monumental de Maturín, Maturín
Attendance: 30,000
Referee: Enrique Osses (Chile)

2009-01-21
18:00 UTC-4:30

Colombia	1 – 0	Peru
Cuesta 34'	Report

Estadio Monumental de Maturín, Maturín
Attendance: 4,000
Referee: Joaquín Antequera (Bolivia)

2009-01-21
20:30 UTC-4:30

Ecuador	0 – 0	Venezuela
	Report

Estadio Monumental de Maturín, Maturín
Attendance: 10,000
Referee: Antonio Arias (Paraguay)

2009-01-23
18:00 UTC-4:30

Ecuador	0 – 0	Colombia
	Report

Estadio Monumental de Maturín, Maturín
Referee: Salvio Fagundes (Brazil)

2009-01-23
20:00 UTC-4:30

Argentina	2 – 1	Peru
Cristaldo 25'; Salvio 76'	Report	Trujillo 3'

Estadio Monumental de Maturín, Maturín
Attendance: 4,000
Referee: Líber Prudente (Uruguay)

2009-01-25
16:00 UTC-4:30

Colombia	2 – 2	Argentina
Pérez 1', 23'	Report	Velázquez 35'; Salvio 52'

Estadio Monumental de Maturín, Maturín
Attendance: 5,000
Referee: Antonio Arias (Paraguay)

2009-01-25
18:00 UTC-4:30

Peru	1 – 3	Venezuela
Barros 83'	Report	Peña 22'; Camacho 51'; Del Valle 87' (pen.)

Estadio Monumental de Maturín, Maturín
Attendance: 15,000
Referee: Joaquín Antequera (Bolivia)

2009-01-27
18:00 UTC-4:30

Argentina	2 – 2	Ecuador
Gaitán 32'; Bella 79'	Report	Pinto 39'; Anangonó 78'

Estadio Monumental de Maturín, Maturín
Attendance: 2,000
Referee: Salvio Fagundes (Brazil)

2009-01-27
20:00 UTC-4:30

Venezuela	1 – 1	Colombia
Rondón 42'	Report	Nazarith 63' (pen.)

Estadio Monumental de Maturín, Maturín
Attendance: 18,000
Referee: Enrique Osses (Chile)

=== Group B ===
Team	Pld	W	D	L	GF	GA	GD	Pts
Uruguay	4	4	0	0	12	6	+6	12
Paraguay	4	2	1	1	10	7	+3	7
Brazil	4	2	1	1	7	5	+2	7
Chile	4	1	0	3	5	7	-2	3
Bolivia	4	0	0	4	2	11	-9	0

==== Match schedule ====
2009-01-20
18:00 UTC-4:30

Bolivia	0 – 2	Uruguay
	Report	Lodeiro 53', 90'

Polideportivo Cachamay, Puerto Ordaz
Attendance: 7,000
Referee: Juan Soto (Venezuela)

2009-01-20
20:00 UTC-4:30

Brazil	1 – 1	Paraguay
Walter 8'	Report	Pérez 78'

Polideportivo Cachamay, Puerto Ordaz
Attendance: 15,000
Referee: Saúl Laverni (Argentina)

2009-01-22
18:00 UTC-4:30

Uruguay	3 – 2	Chile
Viudez 1'; Peña 41'; García 70'	Report	Aránguiz 6'; Sagredo 9' (pen.)

Polideportivo Cachamay, Puerto Ordaz
Attendance: 3,000
Referee: Wilmar Roldán (Colombia)

2009-01-22
20:00 UTC-4:30

Brazil	2 – 1	Bolivia
Walter 35'; Tales 51'	Report	Castedo 24'

Polideportivo Cachamay, Puerto Ordaz
Attendance: 7,000
Referee: Georges Buckley (Peru)

2009-01-24
16:00 UTC-4:30

Chile	2 – 0	Bolivia
Gómez 80' 85'	Report

Polideportivo Cachamay, Puerto Ordaz
Attendance: 2,000
Referee: Carlos Vera (Ecuador)

2009-01-24
18:00 UTC-4:30

Paraguay	2 – 4	Uruguay
Ramirez 21'; Santander 90+2'	Report	Cabrera 52'; Garcia 54'; Lodeiro 77'; Urretavizcaya 79'

Polideportivo Cachamay, Puerto Ordaz
Attendance: 5,000
Referee: Saúl Laverni (Argentina)

2009-01-26
18:00 UTC-4:30

Bolivia	1 – 5	Paraguay
Tudor 23'	Report	Cristaldo 8'; Ramirez 21' 74' 84'; Ortiz 90+1'

Polideportivo Cachamay, Puerto Ordaz
Attendance: 1,000
Referee: Juan Soto (Venezuela)

2009-01-26
20:00 UTC-4:30

Chile	0 – 2	Brazil
	Report	Dentinho 10'; Maylson 77'

Polideportivo Cachamay, Puerto Ordaz
Attendance: 7,000
Referee: Wilmar Roldán (Colombia)

2009-01-28
18:00 UTC-4:30

Paraguay	2 – 1	Chile
Santander 56' 58'	Report	Gómez 6'

Polideportivo Cachamay, Puerto Ordaz
Attendance: 4,000
Referee: Georges Buckley (Peru)

2009-01-28
20:00 UTC-4:30

Uruguay	3 – 2	Brazil
Córdoba 22'; Hernández 69' 85'	Report	Douglas Costa 34'; Alan Kardec 64'

Polideportivo Cachamay, Puerto Ordaz
Attendance: 9,000
Referee: Carlos Vera (Ecuador)

== Final Group ==
Team	Pld	W	D	L	GF	GA	GD	Pts
Brazil	5	4	0	1	10	4	+6	12
Paraguay	5	2	2	1	8	5	+3	8
Uruguay	5	2	1	2	9	10	-1	7
Venezuela	5	2	1	2	6	9	-3	7
Colombia	5	2	0	3	6	7	-1	6
Argentina	5	0	2	3	3	7	-4	2

2009-01-31
16:00 UTC-4:30

Argentina	1 – 1	Paraguay
Cristaldo 48'	Report	Pérez 61'

Polideportivo Cachamay, Puerto Ordaz
Attendance: 3,000
Referee: Wilmar Roldán (Colombia)

2009-01-31
18:15 UTC-4:30

Uruguay	2 – 3	Brazil
García 40'; Hernández 90+5'	Report	Walter 20' 31'; Douglas Costa 78'

Polideportivo Cachamay, Puerto Ordaz
Attendance: 8,000
Referee: Enrique Osses (Chile)

2009-01-31
20:30 UTC-4:30

Venezuela	2 – 1	Colombia
Del Valle 36' (pen.); Fernandez 61'	Report	Blanco 14'

Estadio José Antonio Anzoátegui, Puerto La Cruz
Attendance: 15,000
Referee: Saúl Laverni (Argentina)

2009-02-02
16:00 UTC-4:30

Brazil	2 – 0	Argentina
Alan Kardec 66' (pen.); Giuliano 86'	Report

Estadio Monumental de Maturín, Maturín
Attendance: 1,000
Referee: Líber Prudente (Uruguay)

2009-02-02
18:15 UTC-4:30

Uruguay	2 – 1	Colombia
Aguirregaray 58'; Charquero 78'	Report	Pertúz 10'

Estadio Monumental de Maturín, Maturín
Attendance: 3,000
Referee: Salvio Fagundes (Brazil)

2009-02-02
20:30 UTC-4:30

Paraguay	3 – 0	Venezuela
Santander 6'; Pérez 67'; Ramírez 85'	Report

Estadio José Antonio Anzoátegui, Puerto La Cruz
Attendance: 12,000
Referee: Carlos Vera (Ecuador)

2009-02-04
16:00 UTC-4:30

Colombia	2 – 1	Paraguay
Pertúz 1'; Cárdenas 17' (pen.)	Report	Pérez 48'

Estadio José Antonio Anzoátegui, Puerto La Cruz
Attendance: 500
Referee: Georges Buckley (Peru)

2009-02-04
18:15 UTC-4:30

Argentina	1 – 2	Uruguay
Salvio 85'	Report	Urretavizcaya 71'; Hernández 77'

Estadio José Antonio Anzoátegui, Puerto La Cruz
Attendance: 5,000
Referee: Carlos Vera (Ecuador)

2009-02-04
20:30 UTC-4:30

Venezuela	0 – 3	Brazil
	Report	Maylson 35'; Giuliano 46'; Sandro 57'

Estadio José Antonio Anzoátegui, Puerto La Cruz
Attendance: 22,000
Referee: Antonio Arias (Paraguay)

2009-02-06
16:00 UTC-4:30

Colombia	1 – 2	Brazil
Pertúz 73' (pen.)	Report	Walter 31'; Douglas Costa 35'

Estadio José Antonio Anzoátegui, Puerto La Cruz
Attendance: 1,000
Referee: Carlos Vera (Ecuador)

2009-02-06
18:15 UTC-4:30

Uruguay	2 – 2	Paraguay
Urretavizcaya 13'; Hernández 74'	Report	Paniagua 15' 34'

Estadio José Antonio Anzoátegui, Puerto La Cruz
Attendance: 5,000
Referee: Joaquín Antequera (Bolivia)

2009-02-06
20:30 UTC-4:30

Venezuela	1 – 1	Argentina
Rondon 81'	Report	Benítez 90+3'

Estadio José Antonio Anzoátegui, Puerto La Cruz
Attendance: 10,000
Referee: Georges Buckley (Peru)

2009-02-08
16:00 UTC-4:30

Argentina	0 – 1	Colombia
	Report	Chará 65'

Estadio José Antonio Anzoátegui, Puerto La Cruz
Attendance: 5,000
Referee: Joaquín Antequera (Bolivia)

2009-02-08
18:15 UTC-4:30

Venezuela	3 – 1	Uruguay
Velásquez 14'; Peña 54' (o.g.); Acosta 69'	Report	García 45'

Estadio José Antonio Anzoátegui, Puerto La Cruz
Attendance: 15,000
Referee: Salvio Fagundes (Brazil)

2009-02-08
20:30 UTC-4:30

Paraguay	1 – 0	Brazil
Pérez 56'	Report

Estadio José Antonio Anzoátegui, Puerto La Cruz
Attendance: 3,000
Referee: Georges Buckley (Peru)

== Winners ==
2009 South American Youth Championship winners

Brazil
Tenth title

== Goal scorers ==
5 goals

- (Brazil) Walter
- (Paraguay) Robin Ramírez
- (Paraguay) Hernán Pérez
- (Uruguay) Abel Hernández

4 goals

- (Argentina) Eduardo Salvio
- (Paraguay) Federico Santander

3 goals

- (Brazil) Douglas Costa
- (Chile) Mauricio Gómez
- (Colombia) Hernán Pertúz
- (Uruguay) Nicolás Lodeiro
- (Uruguay) Jonathan Urretavizcaya
- (Uruguay) Santiago García
- (Venezuela) Salomón Rondón

2 goals

- (Argentina) Jonathan Cristaldo
- (Brazil) Alan Kardec
- (Brazil) Giuliano
- (Brazil) Maylson
- (Colombia) Marco Perez
- (Ecuador) Joao Rojas
- (Paraguay) Aldo Andrés Paniagua
- (Peru) Juan José Barros
- (Venezuela) Yonathan Del Valle

1 goal

- (Argentina) Leandro Velázquez
- (Argentina) Marcelo Benítez
- (Argentina) Cristian Gaitán
- (Argentina) Iván Bella
- (Bolivia) Jehanamed Castedo
- (Bolivia) Nicolás Darío Tudor
- (Brazil) Tales
- (Brazil) Dentinho
- (Brazil) Sandro
- (Chile) Boris Sagredo
- (Chile) Charles Aránguiz
- (Colombia) Yamith Cuesta
- (Colombia) Cristian Nazarith
- (Colombia) Elkin Blanco
- (Colombia) Sherman Cárdenas
- (Ecuador) Juan Luis Anangonó
- (Ecuador) Jefferson Pinto
- (Paraguay) Gustavo Cristaldo
- (Paraguay) Celso Ortiz
- (Peru) Luis Trujillo
- (Uruguay) Tabaré Viudez
- (Uruguay) Alejandro Peña
- (Uruguay) Leandro Cabrera
- (Uruguay) Marcelo Andrés Silva
- (Uruguay) Maximiliano Córdoba
- (Uruguay) Matías Aguirregaray

1 goal cont.

- (Uruguay) Jonathan Charquero
- (Venezuela) Louis Ángelo Peña
- (Venezuela) Carlos Enrique Fernández
- (Venezuela) Pablo Camacho
- (Venezuela) José Manuel Velázquez
- (Venezuela) Rafael Acosta

own goals

- (Uruguay) Alejandro Peña (from Venezuela)

== Qualified for the 2009 FIFA U-20 World Cup ==
Brazil
Paraguay
Uruguay
Venezuela

== See also ==
- 2009 FIFA U-20 World Cup
- 2009 South American Under 17 Football Championship
