= Michael Castro (footballer) =

Ecuadorian footballer (born 1989)

Personal information
- Full name: Roberto Michael Castro
- Date of birth: July 15, 1989 (age 37)
- Place of birth: Quito, Ecuador
- Height: 1.76 m (5 ft 9 in)
- Position: Center back

Team information
- Current team: América de Quito

Senior career*
Years	Team	Apps	(Gls)
2006–2016	Deportivo Quito	98	(2)
2016	ESPOLI	?	(?)
2016	Delfín	6	(0)
2017–	América de Quito	?	(?)

International career
2007–2008	Ecuador U-20	7	(0)
- * Club domestic league appearances and goals as of 9 November 2017

Roberto Michael Castro (born 15 July 1989) is an Ecuadorian footballer who plays for América de Quito.

== Club career ==
Castro has always played for Deportivo Quito. Castro first broke into the first team squad in 2006. In the 2006 and 2007 seasons, he was used a lot because of his great ability to defend. However, in the 2008 season, he helped Deportivo Quito win the Copa Pilsener 2008. He was a key player in that season and he did start a lot of matches including coming in as a substitute. He started 28 matches and only came as a substitute 1 time in the season.

== International career ==
Castro was part of Ecuador's squad in the 2007 Pan American Games. He was one of the key figures in his country's gold medal win of the tournament. He was also called up to participate in the 2009 South American Youth Championship where Ecuador was eliminated early by a coin toss.
