= Sebastián Barrientos =

Chilean footballer (born 1989)

Personal information
- Full name: Sebastián Andrés Barrientos Olivares
- Date of birth: 20 January 1989 (age 37)
- Place of birth: Osorno, Chile
- Height: 1.70 m (5 ft 7 in)
- Position: Forward

Youth career
- Universidad Católica

Senior career*
Years	Team	Apps	(Gls)
2007–2010	Universidad Católica	30	(4)

International career
2008	Chile U18	2	(1)

Managerial career
- 2025–: Universidad Católica (assistant)
- * Club domestic league appearances and goals

Sebastián Andrés Barrientos Olivares (born 20 January 1989), commonly known as Seba Barrientos, is a Chilean former footballer who played as striker for Universidad Católica in the Chilean Primera División.

== International career ==
Along with Chile U18 he won the 2008 João Havelange Tournament, scoring a goal.

Barrientos was also used recurrently by Marcelo Bielsa as "sparring" for the senior national team.

== Coaching career ==
In May 2025, Barrientos assumed as assistant coach of Rodrigo Valenzuela in Universidad Católica.

== Personal life ==
Sebastián is the son of the former footballer Leonel Barrientos. In addition, his brother, Leonel Jr., was with the Universidad Católica youth ranks.

== Honours ==
Chile U18

- João Havelange Tournament (1): 2008
