= Fabricio Guevara =

Ecuadorian footballer (born 1989)

Personal information
- Full name: Fabricio Jonathan Guevara Cangá
- Date of birth: 16 February 1989 (age 37)
- Place of birth: Esmeraldas, Ecuador
- Height: 1.72 m (5 ft 8 in)
- Position: Winger

Team information
- Current team: El Nacional
- Number: 11

Youth career
- 2006–2007: El Nacional U-19

Senior career*
Years	Team	Apps	(Gls)
2007–2012	El Nacional	122	(3)
2013–2014	LDU Loja	52	(2)

International career
2008	Ecuador	1	(0)
- * Club domestic league appearances and goals as of 27 October 2008

Fabricio Jonathan Guevara Cangá (born February 16, 1989) is an Ecuadorian former footballer who played for Club Deportivo El Nacional.

== International career ==
On November 12, 2008, he was called up to play a friendly match against Mexico. He came on as a substitute on one of the last minutes of the game.

== Honours ==
=== National team ===
- Ecuador U-20
  - Pan American Games: Gold Medal
