= Israel Chango =

Ecuadorian footballer (born 1989)

Personal information
- Full name: Israel Fernando Chango Jaramillo
- Date of birth: June 16, 1989 (age 37)
- Place of birth: Mera, Pastaza, Ecuador
- Height: 1.67 m (5 ft 6 in)
- Position: Midfielder

Youth career
- 2003–2005: 12 de Febrero
- 2005–2010: LDU Quito

Senior career*
Years	Team	Apps	(Gls)
2006–2010	LDU Quito	64	(1)
2010	→ LDU Loja (loan)	39	(2)
2011	LDU Loja	14	(1)
2012–2014	Macará	69	(0)
2016	Sarayacu	1	(0)

International career
2006	Ecuador U-20	7	(1)
Medal record
Representing Ecuador
Men's Football
Pan American Games
Gold medal – first place	2007 Rio de Janeiro	Team competition
- * Club domestic league appearances and goals as of June 15, 2016

Israel Fernando Chango Jaramillo (born January 16, 1989) is an Ecuadorian footballer. He is a midfielder. He was part of the squad who won the 2008 Copa Libertadores with LDU Quito.

== Club career ==
Chango started out in the youth ranks of LDU Quito. In 2007, he received a promotion to the regular team and is now used several times. He is seen as a future starter for his club. Although he did not play any games for Liga in the tournament, his team went on to win the title by penalties. His team is the first Ecuadorian team to win the Copa Libertadores in history.

== International career ==
Chango played a key role for the U-20 national team for Ecuador. He played in the 2007 Pan American Games in Group A. The team won Group A and were the only ones to qualify from that group. He scored his only goal for the U-20 side in a game against Honduras. Ecuador went on to defeat Bolivia 1–0 in the semifinal and later Jamaica 2–1 to claim Ecuador's first ever international title. He will be called up once again to participate in the 2009 South American Youth Championship in Venezuela as one of the key players.

== Honours ==
=== Club ===
- Liga de Quito
  - Copa Libertadores: 2008

=== National team ===
- Ecuador U-20
  - Pan American Games: Gold Medal
