= Wilson Folleco =

Ecuadorian footballer (born 1989)

Personal information
- Full name: Wilson Adalberto Folleco Morales
- Date of birth: 4 September 1989 (age 37)
- Place of birth: Imbabura, Ecuador
- Positions: Wing back; winger

Team information
- Current team: Imbabura

Senior career*
Years	Team	Apps	(Gls)
2006–2011	Imbabura	127	(5)
2008	→ Deportivo Cuenca (loan)	12	(3)
2009	→ Barcelona SC (loan)	7	(0)
2010	→ Macará (loan)	30	(1)
2012	Deportivo Quito	10	(1)
2013	El Nacional	5	(0)
2013	Técnico Universitario		
2014	Manta		
2016-2017	Imbabura		(2)
2018	LDU Portoviejo		(2)
2018	Imbabura		
2018	LDU Portoviejo		
2019-2021	Gualaceo		(9)
2023–	Imbabura		

International career^{‡}
2006–2009	Ecuador U-20	6	(0)
- * Club domestic league appearances and goals as of 1 May 2013 ‡ National team caps and goals as of 10 January 2009

Wilson Adalberto Folleco Morales (born 4 September 1989) is an Ecuadorian footballer currently playing for Imbabura.

== Club career ==
Folleco started playing professionally for Imbabura. He spent about a year playing there and already got interest from many teams because of his versatile position. He was loaned out to Deportivo Cuenca in the 2008 season. He had a spectacular season with Cuenca even though they did not do very well in the liguilla final.

He played seven times for Barcelona Sporting Club during the 2009 season.

In 2019, Folleco joined Gualaceo Sporting Club.

== International career ==
Folleco played in the 2007 Pan American Games with Ecuador. He was called up for the 2009 South American Youth Championship.

== Honours ==
=== National team ===
- Ecuador U-20
  - Pan American Games: Gold Medal
