= Edmundo Zura =

Ecuadorian footballer (born 1983)

Personal information
- Full name: Edmundo Salomón Zura de Jesús
- Date of birth: 12 January 1983 (age 43)
- Place of birth: Pimampiro, Ecuador
- Height: 1.82 m (6 ft 0 in)
- Position: Striker

Team information
- Current team: Deportivo Quito

Youth career
- 2000–2001: LDU Quito
- 2001: Imbabura SC

Senior career*
Years	Team	Apps	(Gls)
2001–2002	El Nacional	0	(0)
2002–2009	Imbabura SC	54	(23)
2004	→ Macará (loan)	7	(0)
2007–2008	→ Barcelona SC (loan)	5	(1)
2008	→ Newcastle Jets (loan)	9	(0)
2009–2013	El Nacional	45	(14)
2011	→ San Jose Earthquakes (loan)	1	(0)
2013	Deportivo Quito		
2013-2015	Mushuc Runa		
2015-2015	C.D. Técnico Universitario		
2015-2016	Deportivo Otavalo		
2016-2017	SD Rayo		
2019	Carchi 04 FC		

International career^{‡}
2006–2009	Ecuador	11	(1)
- * Club domestic league appearances and goals as of 15 August 2011 ‡ National team caps and goals as of 1 August 2008

Edmundo Salomón Zura de Jesús (born 12 January 1983 in Pimampiro, Imbabura), is an Ecuadorian professional footballer who plays for El Nacional. Zura is a centre forward who is known for his superb heading, powerful shooting and ruthless finishing.

Zura celebrates his goals by donning a blue Spider-Man style wrestling mask as a tribute to Otilino Tenorio who was killed in a car accident. His brother Rommel Zura is also a professional footballer and playing for Emelec.

== Club career ==
Zura started out playing with the LDU Quito under-18 side before joining Imbabura SC where he played in the lower divisions. He then moved to El Nacional for six months before rejoining Imbabura SC. He is currently under contract with Imbabura SC until 2011.

Zura was loaned out to Macará for a short period in 2004 where he played in the top division of Campeonato Ecuatoriano de Fútbol before returning to play for Imbabura in the Serie B. He helped Imbabura secure its promotion to the Serie A during the 2006 Clausura where he was the league's top scorer with 18 goals.

Following his impressive displays at the 2007 Pan American Games, Zura was again loaned out, this time to Barcelona SC of Guayaquil. He joined the Ecuadorian giants in December 2007 but his contract was not extended when it expired on 30 June 2008. He returned to Imbabura after only playing five games for Barcelona SC, having been given only limited opportunities by manager Ever Hugo Almeida. After his return to Imbabura he played several games in the Serie B but made it clear that he intended to leave and play abroad.

On 31 July 2008 Zura joined the reigning Australian champions Newcastle Jets as a marquee player. Zura has joined the Newcastle Jets from Imbabura on a one-year loan deal. He had to travel to Santiago, Chile to obtain an Australian tourist visa which was to be converted to a sporting visa before he could make his A-League debut. As with most imports coming to the A-League, he tried to get his fitness levels up to compete in the physical and up-tempo A-League style of play.

On 3 November 2008, Newcastle Jets and the striker parted ways. The Ecuadorean requested a mutual termination of his one-year loan deal, citing personal reasons.

Zura joined Major League Soccer club San Jose Earthquakes via loan on 15 August 2011. The loan was terminated by San Jose on 31 August 2011 due to Zura's lack of fitness. Zura returned to El Nacional.

In December 2012, Zura moved to Deportivo Quito, where he played with his older brother Romel.

Following a short stint with Muchuc Runa, Zura was moved to Club Deportivo Tecnico Universitario, which played in the Ecuadorian Serie B at the time.

Zura retired in 2019.

== International career ==
Zura earned his first cap for Ecuador against Brazil on 10 October 2006 after being called up by Colombia coach Luis Fernando Suárez. He scored his first international goal on 21 January 2007 against Sweden.

Zura captained Ecuador's under-23 side to victory as an overage player at the 2007 Pan American Games. He scored three goals including the match winning penalty in the final as Ecuador won their first international tournament. He was regarded as Ecuador's most impressive player of the tournament.

== Career statistics ==
=== Club ===
(Correct as of 7 October 2008)

Club	League	Season	League			Finals			Asia			Total		
Club	League	Season	Apps	Goals	Assists	Apps	Goals	Assists	Apps	Goals	Assists	Apps	Goals	Assists
Macará	Campeonato Serie A	2004	7	0	-	-	-	-	-	-	-	7	0	-
Imbabura SC	Campeonato Serie B	2006	32	18	-	-	-	-	-	-	-	32	18	-
Imbabura SC	Campeonato Serie A	2007	20	5	-	-	-	-	-	-	-	20	5	-
Barcelona SC	Campeonato Serie A	2008	5	1	-	-	-	-	-	-	-	5	1	-
Imbabura SC	Campeonato Serie B	2008	2	0	-	-	-	-	-	-	-	2	0	-
Newcastle Jets	A-League	2008–09	7	0	1	0	0	0	0	0	0	4	0	1
Total												67	23	0

== Honours ==
=== Club ===
Imbabura

- Campeonato Ecuatoriano de Fútbol (2ª division) Clausura: 2006

=== International ===
Ecuador U-20

- Pan American Games: Gold Medal
