= Ricardo Cousins =

Jamaican footballer (born 1987)

Personal information
- Full name: Ricardo Cousins
- Date of birth: 7 August 1987 (age 39)
- Place of birth: Jamaica
- Height: 1.76 m (5 ft 9 1/2 in)
- Position: Midfielder

Team information
- Current team: Humble Lions FC
- Number: 7

Youth career
- 2003–2005: Sporting Central Academy

Senior career*
Years	Team	Apps	(Gls)
2005–2012	Portmore United	106	(21)
2012–2013	Väsby United	8	(4)
2013–2014	Sheikh Russel KC	?	(?)
2014–	Humble Lions FC	?	(?)

International career^{‡}
2008–	Jamaica	7	(0)
- * Club domestic league appearances and goals as of 2 January 2014 ‡ National team caps and goals as of 3 March 2011

Ricardo Cousins (born 10 August 1987) is a Jamaican footballer, who currently plays for Humble Lions FC.

== Youth career ==
Ricardo Cousins came up through the youth system of Sporting Central Academy and Glenmiur High School in Clarendon, Jamaica.

== Club career ==
In 2008, he led Portmore United F.C to the Jamaica National Premier League title. For 2010/2011 season, Cousins has once again stabilized the central midfield for Portmore United. In 2012 Cousins captained Portmore United to the Red Stripe Premiere League title. In 2013, he has joined Bangladesh Premier League (football) club Sheikh Russel KC.

== International career ==
In 2007, he led Jamaica U20 national team to the 2007 Pan Am Games Finals. In 2008, Cousins made his senior international debut against Trinidad and Tobago after impressing then Technical Director, Rene Simoes. Cousins earned a national team recall in April 2010 for a match versus South Africa.

== Honours ==
=== Portmore United ===
- Winner (2): 2008, 2012 Jamaica National Premier League
- Winner (1): 2007 JFF Champions Cup

=== Jamaica ===
- Runner-up(1): 2007 Pan Am Games
