= Cristián Gaitán =

Argentine footballer

Personal information
- Full name: Cristián Iván Gaitán
- Date of birth: 15 January 1990 (age 36)
- Place of birth: Capitán Bermudez, Santa Fe, Argentina
- Position: Midfielder

Team information
- Current team: Lynx
- Number: 14

Senior career*
Years	Team	Apps	(Gls)
2009–2010	Estudiantes de La Plata	8	(0)
2010–2011	Unión de Santa Fe	17	(0)
2011–2012	Instituto de Córdoba	14	(0)
2013–2015	Cobreloa	64	(5)
2016	General Díaz	11	(1)
2017–2018	Unión de Sunchales	17	(0)
2018–2019	General Díaz	35	(1)
2020	Deportes Concepción	17	(1)
2022	Sportivo Ameliano	19	(1)
2023	Douglas Haig	6	(0)
2024	Sol de América	2	(0)
2024–2025	Boyacá Chicó	11	(0)
2025–	Lynx	13	(0)
- * Club domestic league appearances and goals as of 6 December 2025

Cristián Iván Gaitán (born January 15, 1990) is an Argentine footballer. He previously played for Estudiantes de La Plata (2004–2010), Unión de Santa Fe (2010–2011), Instituto de Córdoba (2011–2012) in Argentina and for Cobreloa (2013–2015) in Chile.

World Cup's participations

World Cup	Place	Year
World Cup U-17	South Korea	2007

National selection

Competition	Host country	Year
South American U-17	Ecuador	2007
South American U-20	Venezuela	2009

Honours

Achievements	Team	Season
Earned promotion Primera division Argentina	Unión de Santa Fe	2010–2011
