= Juan José Barros =

Colombian-born Peruvian footballer (born 1989)

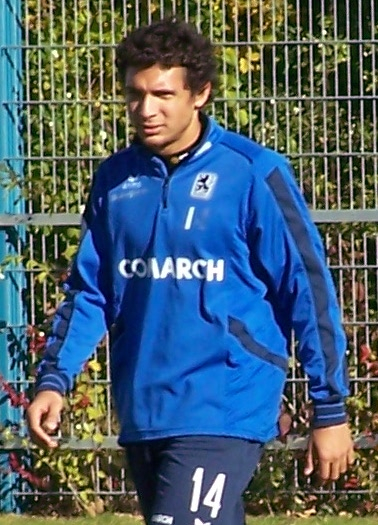
- Barros with 1860 München in 2010

Personal information
- Full name: Juan José Barros Araujo
- Date of birth: 24 June 1989 (age 37)
- Place of birth: Barranquilla, Colombia
- Height: 1.84 m (6 ft 1/2 in)
- Position: Midfielder

Youth career
- –1997: Deportivo Cali
- 1997–1999: Centro Iqueño
- 2000: Deportivo Zúñiga
- 2001–2004: Academia Cantolao
- 2005–2006: Circolo Sportivo Italiano
- 2006: Coronel Bolognesi

Senior career*
Years	Team	Apps	(Gls)
2006–2011	Coronel Bolognesi	70	(14)
2010	→ Universitario (loan)	12	(1)
2010	→ 1860 München (loan)	1	(0)
2011	Melgar	20	(1)
2012	Sporting Cristal	4	(0)
2012	Cobreloa	11	(3)
2013	Unión Comercio	41	(2)
2014	UTC	7	(0)
Total		166	(21)

International career
2008–2010	Peru U20	6	(2)
- * Club domestic league appearances and goals

Juan José Barros Araujo (born 24 June 1989 in Barranquilla, Colombia) is a Colombian-born Peruvian former footballer.

== Club career ==
At the club level, Barros played for Coronel Bolognesi from 2006 to 2009. He helped Bolognesi win the 2007 Torneo Clausura.

In 2012, Barros had a stint with Chilean club Cobreloa.

His last club was Universidad Técnica de Cajamarca (UTC) in 2014.

== International career ==
He also played six games for the Peru national under-20 football team and scored two goals.

== Personal life ==
Born in Barranquilla, Colombia, Barros moved to Peru along with his family at the age of 8. He naturalized Peruvian at the age of 18.

== Honours ==
Coronel Bolognesi

- Torneo Clausura: 2007
