= Jefferson Pinto =

Ecuadorian footballer (born 1990)

Personal information
- Full name: Jefferson David Pinto Quiróz
- Date of birth: March 23, 1990 (age 36)
- Place of birth: Buena Fe, Los Ríos, Ecuador
- Height: 1.74 m (5 ft 9 in)
- Position: Defensive midfielder

Team information
- Current team: Emelec

Youth career
- 2004–2008: Emelec

Senior career*
Years	Team	Apps	(Gls)
2007–present	Emelec	25	(1)

International career^{‡}
2008–present	Ecuador	1	(0)
- * Club domestic league appearances and goals as of 7 February 2009 ‡ National team caps and goals as of 7 February 2009

Jefferson David Pinto Quiróz (born March 23, 1990) is an Ecuadorian footballer who plays as a defensive midfielder for Emelec in Serie A de Ecuador.

== Club career ==
He came from Emelec's youth system and has played for Emelec as a regular starter throughout his career.

== International career ==
Pinto received his first call-up with the national team against Haiti in a 3–1 win for Ecuador.

== Honours ==
=== National team ===
- Ecuador U-20
  - Pan American Games: Gold Medal
