= Argentina at the 2007 Pan American Games =

- IOC code: ARG
- NOC: Comité Olímpico Argentino

in Rio de Janeiro 13–29 July 2007
- Competitors: 441 in 30 sports
- Flag bearer: Luciana Aymar
- Medals Ranked 7th: Gold 11 Silver 16 Bronze 33 Total 60

Pan American Games appearances (overview)
- 1951; 1955; 1959; 1963; 1967; 1971; 1975; 1979; 1983; 1987; 1991; 1995; 1999; 2003; 2007; 2011; 2015; 2019; 2023; 2027

Argentina participated at the 2007 Pan American Games in Rio de Janeiro, Brazil. The Argentine delegation counted a total number of 441 athletes. Argentina competed in all events, except for baseball and diving. The delegation's main bet was the Field hockey women's team, Las Leonas, led by Luciana Aymar, who carried the Argentine flag at the opening ceremony.

== Medalists ==
Medal	Name	Sport	Event	Date
Gold	Juan Curuchet; Walter Pérez	Cycling	Men's madison	19 July
Gold	Gabriela Díaz	Cycling	Women's BMX	19 July
Gold	Argentina women's national field hockey team: Belén Succi; Magdalena Aicega; Rosario Luchetti; Alejandra Gulla; Luciana Aymar; Agustina Bouza; Carla Rebecchi; Mariana González Oliva; Mercedes Margalot; Daniela Maloberti; Paola Vukojicic; Mariné Russo; Gabriela Aguirre; Claudia Burkart; Giselle Kañevsky; Noel Barrionuevo	Field Hockey	Women's tournament	24 July
Gold	Miguel Albarracín	Judo	Men's 60 kg	22 July
Gold	Francisco Nievas	Karate	Men's 60 kg	27 July
Gold	Leila Vanzulli	Roller sports	Women's free skating	22 July
Gold	Santiago Fernández	Rowing	Men's single sculls	17 July
Gold	Joaquín Iwan; Diego López; Maximiliano Martínez; Horacio Sicilia	Rowing	Men's coxless four	17 July
Gold	Juan Carlos Dasque	Shooting	Men's trap	15 July
Gold	Eduardo Schwank; Horacio Zeballos	Tennis	Men's doubles	29 July
Gold	Jorgelina Cravero; Betina Jozami	Tennis	Women's doubles	29 July
Silver	Juan Pablo Bergero; Pablo de Torres	Canoeing	Men's K-2 1000 m	27 July
Silver	Fernanda Lauro	Canoeing	Women's K-1 500 m	28 July
Silver	Matías Médici	Cycling	Men's time trial	15 July
Silver	Argentina national futsal team: José Mandayo; Leandro Planas; José Luis Costas; Diego Giustozzi; Carlos Sánchez; Leandro Cuzzolino; Fernando Wilhelm; Hernán Garcias; Edgardo Amas; Matías Lucuix; Esteban Sánchez; Santiago Elías	Futsal		28 July
Silver	Argentina men's national handball team: Matías Schulz; Sergio Crevatin; Federico Pizarro; Matías Lima; Mariano CastroCastro; Maximiliano Ferro; Alejo Carrara; Bruno Civelli; Facundo Torres; Fernando García; Emiliano la Rosa; Gonzalo Carou; Germán Pardales; Damián Migueles	Handball	Men's tournament	22 July
Silver	Argentina men's national field hockey team: Juan Manuel Vivaldi; Juan Ignacio Gilardi; Pedro Ibarra; Mariano Chao; Mario Almada; Lucas Rey; Rodrigo Vila; Jorge Lombi; Fernando Zilberberg; Matías Paredes; Tomás Argento; Matías Rey; Lucas Argento; Lucas Rossi; Ricardo Bergner	Field Hockey	Men's tournament	25 July
Silver	Daniel Arriola	Roller sports	Men's free skating	21 July
Silver	Rodrigo Murillo; Ariel Suárez	Rowing	Men's double sculls	18 July
Silver	Víctor Claus; Santiago Fernández; Ariel Suárez; Cristian Rosso	Rowing	Men's quadruple sculls	19 July
Silver	Gabriela Best	Rowing	Women's single sculls	17 July
Silver	Sebastián Brusa; Joaquín Duarte; Gustavo González	Sailing	J/24	28 July
Silver	José Meolans	Swimming	Men's 100 m freestyle	18 July
Silver	Liu Song	Table tennis	Men's singles	28 July
Silver	Juan Frery; Liu Song; Pablo Tabachnik	Table tennis	Men's team	24 July
Silver	Pedro Stetsiuk	Weightlifting	Men's 105 kg	18 July
Silver	Mariano Reutemann	Sailing	Men's Sailboard	July
Bronze	Germán Chiaraviglio	Athletics	Men's pole vault	28 July
Bronze	Juan Ignacio Cerra	Athletics	Men's hammer throw	25 July
Bronze	Jennifer Dahlgren	Athletics	Women's hammer throw	23 July
Bronze	Luis Rueda	Boxing	Lightweight	27 July
Bronze	Diego Chaves	Boxing	Welterweight	27 July
Bronze	Lucas Legnani	Bowling	Men's individual	26 July
Bronze	Juan Pablo Bergero; Pablo de Torres	Canoeing	Men's K-2 500 m	28 July
Bronze	Darío Gasco	Cycling	Men's cross-country	14 July
Bronze	Fernando Antogna	Cycling	Men's individual pursuit	16 July
Bronze	Leandro Bottasso	Cycling	Men's keirin	19 July
Bronze	Alexander Achten; Ricardo Bustamante; José Félix Domínguez; Diego Drajer	Fencing	Men's team sabre	21 July
Bronze	Argentina women's national handball team: Silvina Schlesinger; María del Carmen Alejandre; Cinthya Basile; Georgina Constantino; Bibiana Ferrea; Antonela Mena; Magdalena Decilio; Lucía Haro; María Emilia Acosta; Sonia Meyer; Silvana Totolo; Valentina Kogan; Lucía Fernández; Solange Tagliavini; Mariana Sanguinetti	Handball	Women's tournament	21 July
Bronze	Paula Pareto	Judo	Women's 48 kg	22 July
Bronze	Daniela Krukower	Judo	Women's 63 kg	21 July
Bronze	Lorena Briceño	Judo	Women's 78 kg	20 July
Bronze	Lucio Martínez	Karate	Men's 65 kg	25 July
Bronze	Damián Fernández	Roller sports	Men's combined sprint	25 July
Bronze	Melisa Bonnet	Roller sports	Women's combined sprint	25 July
Bronze	Silvina Posada	Roller sports	Women's combined distance	25 July
Bronze	Marcelo Bronca; Joel Infante; Joaquín Iwan; Diego López; Maximiliano Martínez; Damian Ordás; Mariano Palermo; Alan San Martín; Horacio Sicilia	Rowing	Men's eight	19 July
Bronze	María Laura Abalo; Gabriela Best; Lucía Palermo; Carolina Schiffmacher	Rowing	Women's quadruple sculls	19 July
Bronze	Julio Alsogaray	Sailing	Men's Laser	28 July
Bronze	Florencia Gutiérrez	Sailing	Women's RS:X	28 July
Bronze	Juan Angeloni	Shooting	Men's 50 metre rifle three positions	19 July
Bronze	Melisa Gil	Shooting	Women's skeet	19 July
Bronze	Georgina Bardach	Swimming	Women's 400 m individual medley	17 July
Bronze	Martín Sío	Taekwondo	Men's 80 kg	16 July
Bronze	Rocío Boudi	Taekwondo	Women's 57 kg	15 July
Bronze	Eduardo Schwank	Tennis	Men's singles	28 July
Bronze	Betina Jozami	Tennis	Women's singles	22 July
Bronze	Edgardo Martín	Water skiing	Men's wakeboard	23 July
Bronze	María Cecilia Floriddia	Weightlifting	Women's 58 kg	15 July

== Basketball ==
=== Men's team competition ===
- Preliminary Round (Group B)
  - Defeated Panama (76-71)
  - Defeated Uruguay (71-69)
  - Lost to United States (71-74)
- Semi Finals
  - Lost to Puerto Rico (80-89)
- Bronze Medal Match
  - Lost to Uruguay (93-99) → Fourth place
- Team Roster
  - Facundo Sucatzky
  - Diego García
  - Gabriel Mikulas
  - Diego Logrippo
  - Luis Cequeira
  - Matías Sandes
  - Román González
  - Martin Leiva
  - Patricio Prato
  - Javier Bulfoni
  - Leonardo Mainoldi
  - Mariano Byro
- Head coach: Gonzalo García

=== Women's team competition ===
- Preliminary Round (Group B)
  - Lost to Cuba (79-81)
  - Lost to United States (54-85)
  - Lost to Colombia (66-68)
- Classification Matches
  - 5th/8th place: Defeated Jamaica (73-61)
  - 5th/6th place: Lost to Colombia (58-59) → Sixth place
- Team Roster
  - Constanza Landra
  - Marina Cava
  - Paula Gatti
  - Marcela Paoletta
  - Celeste Cabañez
  - Florencia Fernández
  - Alejandra Fernández
  - Anastasia Sáenz
  - Sandra Pavón
  - Laura Nicolini
  - Valentina Maggi
  - Alejandra Chesta

== Tennis ==
=== Men's singles ===
- Juan Martin Aranguren
  - First Round — Bye
  - Second Round — Defeated Federico Sansonetti (URU), 6-3 6-1
  - Third Round — Defeated Carlos Salamanca (COL), 7-5 6-1
  - Quarterfinals — Lost to Flávio Saretta (BRA), 2-6 2-6
- Eduardo Schwank
  - First Round — Bye
  - Second Round — Defeated Juan Carlos Ramirez (PAR), 6-2 6-3
  - Third Round — Defeated Jorge Aguilar (CHI), 3-6 6-2 2-6
  - Quarterfinals — Defeated Marcos Daniel (BRA), 2-6 7-6(3) 7-5
  - Semifinals — Lost to Flávio Saretta (BRA), 6-3 5-7 0-6
  - Bronze Medal Match — Defeated Michael Quintero (COL), 6-4 6-0 → Bronze Medal
- Horacio Zeballos
  - First Round — Bye
  - Second Round — Lost to Guillermo Hormazábal (CHI), 6-3 4-6 6-3

=== Men's doubles ===
- Eduardo Schwank and Horacio Zeballos
  - First Round — Bye
  - Second Round — Defeated Cristian Paiz and Sebastien Vidal (GUA), 6-2 6-1
  - Quarterfinals — Defeated Michael Quintero and Carlos Salamanca (COL), 6-2 6-4
  - Semifinals — Defeated Víctor Estrella and Jhonson García (DOM), 6-1 6-0
  - Gold Medal Match — Defeated Jorge Aguilar and Adrián García (CHI), 6-3 6-4 → Gold Medal

== Triathlon ==
=== Men's Competition ===
- Velmar Bianco
  - 1:55:40.29 — 15th place
- Luciano Farías
  - 1:57:03.47 — 21st place
- Lucas Cocha
  - did not finish — no ranking

=== Women's Competition ===
- Pamela Geijo
  - 2:04:37.89 — 16th place
- Nidia Kondratavicius
  - 2:15:46.76 — 26th place
- Paulina Abrego
  - did not finish — no ranking

== See also ==
- Argentina at the 2008 Summer Olympics
