= Chile at the 2007 Pan American Games =

- IOC code: CHI
- NOC: Comité Olímpico de Chile

in Rio de Janeiro 13–29 July 2007
- Competitors: 229
- Flag bearer: Marco Arriagada
- Medals Ranked 10th: Gold 6 Silver 5 Bronze 9 Total 20

Pan American Games appearances (overview)
- 1951; 1955; 1959; 1963; 1967; 1971; 1975; 1979; 1983; 1987; 1991; 1995; 1999; 2003; 2007; 2011; 2015; 2019; 2023; 2027

The 15th Pan American Games were held in Rio de Janeiro, Brazil from 13 July 2007 to 29 July 2007. Chile participated with 228 athletes (144 men, 84 women).

== Medalists ==
Medal	Name	Sport	Event	Date
Gold	Enzo Cesario	Cycling	Men's individual pursuit	July 16
Gold	Soraya Jadue; María Orellana	Rowing	Women's Pairs Lightweight	July 17
Gold	Luis Sepúlveda; Gonzalo Miranda; Enzo Cesario; Marco Arriagada	Cycling	Men's team pursuit	July 18
Gold	Cristián Escalante	Weightlifting	Men's +105 kg	July 18
Gold	Diego Bórquez	Karate	Men's -80 kg	July 26
Gold	Alberto González Abraham; Cristian Herman; Diego González	Sailing	Lightning	July 28
Silver	Felipe Alvear	Fencing	Men's individual foil	July 14
Silver	Tomás González	Gymnastics	Men's vault	July 17
Silver	Carolina Santibáñez	Roller sports	Women's Combined Sprint	July 25
Silver	Adrián García	Tennis	Men's singles	July 28
Silver	Jorge Aguilar; Adrián García	Tennis	Men's doubles	July 28
Bronze	Jaime Iturra	Weightlifting	56 kg	July 14
Bronze	Paris Inostroza	Fencing	Men's individual épée	July 16
Bronze	Miguel Cerda; Felipe Leal	Rowing	Men's double sculls lightweight	July 17
Bronze	Tomás González	Gymnastics	Men's floor	July 17
Bronze	Felipe Miranda	Water skiing	Men's slalom	July 23
Bronze	Rodrigo Miranda	Water skiing	Men's jump	July 24
Bronze	Chile men's national field hockey team	Field hockey	Men's tournament	July 25
Bronze	David Dubó	Karate	Men's -75 kg	July 26
Bronze	Jessy Reyes	Karate	Men's -53 kg	July 26

Medals by sport
Sport	1st place, gold medalist(s)	2nd place, silver medalist(s)	3rd place, bronze medalist(s)	Total
Cycling	2	0	0	2
Karate	1	0	2	3
Rowing	1	0	1	2
Weightlifting	1	0	1	2
Sailing	1	0	0	1
Tennis	0	2	0	2
Fencing	0	1	1	2
Gymnastics	0	1	1	2
Roller sports	0	1	0	1
Water skiing	0	0	2	2
Field hockey	0	0	1	1
Total	6	5	9	20

Medals by day
Day	1st place, gold medalist(s)	2nd place, silver medalist(s)	3rd place, bronze medalist(s)	Total
July 14	0	1	1	2
July 15	0	0	0	0
July 16	1	0	1	2
July 17	1	1	2	4
July 18	2	0	0	2
July 19	0	0	0	0
July 20	0	0	0	0
July 21	0	0	0	0
July 22	0	0	0	0
July 23	0	0	1	1
July 24	0	0	1	1
July 25	0	1	1	2
July 26	1	0	2	3
July 27	0	0	0	0
July 28	1	2	0	3
July 29	0	0	0	0
Total	6	5	9	20

Medals by gender
Gender	1st place, gold medalist(s)	2nd place, silver medalist(s)	3rd place, bronze medalist(s)	Total
Male	5	4	8	17
Female	1	1	1	3
Total	6	5	9	20

Multiple medalists
Name	Sport	1st place, gold medalist(s)	2nd place, silver medalist(s)	3rd place, bronze medalist(s)	Total
Enzo Cesario	Cycling	2	0	0	2
Adrian Garcia	Tennis	0	2	0	2
Tomás González	Gymnastics	0	1	1	2

== Results by event ==
=== Tennis ===
Chile nominated three male and three female tennis players to compete in the tournament.

Men

Athlete	Event	Round of 64	Round of 32	Round of 16	Quarterfinals	Semifinals	Final / BM	
Athlete	Event	Opposition Score	Opposition Score	Opposition Score	Opposition Score	Opposition Score	Opposition Score	Rank
Jorge Aguilar	Singles	BYE	Mullings (BAH); W 6–4, 6–3	Schwank (ARG); L 3–6, 6–2, 2–6	did not advance			
Adrián García	Singles	BYE	Estrella (DOM); W 6–3, 6–3	Romero (VEN); W 6–3, 7–5	Miranda (PER); W 6–2, 7–6^{(7–5)}	Quintero (COL); W 6–4, 7–5	Saretta (BRA); L 3–6, 6–4, 6–7^{(2–7)}	2nd place, silver medalist(s)
Guillermo Hormazábal	Singles	Medina (VEN); W 6–1, 4–6, 6–2	Zeballos (ARG); W 6–3, 4–6, 6–3	Quintero (COL); L 4–6, 1–6	did not advance			
Jorge Aguilar; Adrián García	Doubles	—N/a	BYE	Bedminster / Gardner (ANT); W 6–0, 6–1	Helgeson / Paul (USA); W 7–5, 6–2	González / Romero (MEX); W 6–3, 6–1	Schwank / Zeballos (ARG); L 3–6, 4–6	2nd place, silver medalist(s)

Women

Athlete	Event	Round of 32	Round of 16	Quarterfinals	Semifinals	Final / BM	
Athlete	Event	Opposition Score	Opposition Score	Opposition Score	Opposition Score	Opposition Score	Rank
Catalina Arancibia	Singles	Morales (GUA); L 5–7, 6–7^{(1–7)}	did not advance				
Andrea Koch Benvenuto	Singles	de los Ríos (PAR); L 2–6, 0–6	did not advance				
Melisa Miranda	Singles	Muci (VEN); L 2–6, 6–4, 4–6	did not advance				
Andrea Koch Benvenuto; Melisa Miranda	Doubles	—N/a	Castiblanco / Duque (COL); L 0–6, 6–3, 3–6	did not advance			

=== Triathlon ===
==== Men's Competition ====
- Felipe van de Wyngard
  - 1:56:53.86 — 20th place
- Benjamin Muñizaga
  - 2:07:41.01 — 30th place

==== Women's Competition ====
- Bárbara Riveros
  - 2:01:42.89 — 8th place

== See also ==
- Chile at the Pan American Games
- Events at the 2007 Pan American Games
- Chile at the 2008 Summer Olympics
