= Tennis at the 2007 Pan American Games – Men's doubles =

Men's doubles
- Tennis at the 2007 Pan American Games

Final
- Champions: Eduardo Schwank; (Argentina) Horacio Zeballos (ARG)
- Runners-up: Jorge Aguilar; (Chile) Adrián García (CHI)
- Score: 6–3, 6–4

Events
Singles	men	women
Doubles	men	women
← 2003 ·	Pan American Games	· 2011 →

The men's doubles tournament in tennis at the 2007 Pan American Games was played from July 23 to July 28.

== Medals ==
Gold	Eduardo Schwank / Horacio Zeballos; Argentina
Silver	Jorge Aguilar / Adrián García; Chile
Bronze	Santiago González / Víctor Romero; Mexico

== Seeds ==
1. Jorge Aguilar / Adrián García (CHI) (final, silver medal)
2. Eduardo Schwank / Horacio Zeballos (ARG) (champions, gold medal)
3. Marcos Daniel / Flávio Saretta (BRA) (quarterfinals)
4. Santiago González / Víctor Romero (MEX) (semifinals, bronze medal)
5. Michael Quintero / Carlos Salamanca (COL) (quarterfinals)
6. Jhonnatan Medina-Álvarez / Román Recarte (VEN) (second round)
7. Víctor Estrella / Jhonson García (DOM) (semifinals, fourth place)
8. Gustavo Ramírez / Juan Carlos Ramírez (PAR) (second round)

== Draw ==
=== Key ===
- Q = Qualifier
- WC = Wild card
- LL = Lucky loser
- Alt = Alternate
- ITF = ITF entry
- PR = Protected ranking
- SR = Special ranking
- SE = Special exempt
- JE = Junior exempt
- JR = Junior Accelerator Programme entrant
- CO = College Accelerator Programme entrant
- NG = Next Gen Accelerator Program entrant
- w/o = Walkover
- r = Retired
- d = Defaulted

=== Finals ===
Semifinals
1	J Aguilar (CHI); A García (CHI)	6	6
4	S Gonzalez (MEX); V Romero (MEX)	3	1
7	V Estrella (DOM); J García (DOM)	1	0
2	E Schwank (ARG); H Zeballos (ARG)	6	6

Final
1	J Aguilar (CHI); A García (CHI)	3	4
2	E Schwank (ARG); H Zeballos (ARG)	6	6
Bronze medal match
4	S Gonzalez (MEX); V Romero (MEX)	7	6
7	V Estrella (DOM); J García (DOM)	6^{4}	2

=== Top half ===
First round

Second round
1	J Aguilar (CHI); A García (CHI)	6	6
C Bedminster (ANT); K Gardner (ANT)	0	1
T Helgeson (USA); T Paul (USA)	6	7
8	G Ramírez (PAR); JC Ramírez (PAR)	3	5
4	S Gonzalez (MEX); V Romero (MEX)	6	6
K Elien (ISV); E Highfield (ISV)	4	2
M Felder (URU); F Sansonetti (URU)	3	6	[10]
6	J Medina-Álvarez (VEN); R Recarte (VEN)	6	2	[7]

Quarterfinals
1	J Aguilar (CHI); A García (CHI)	7	6
T Helgeson (USA); T Paul (USA)	5	3
4	S Gonzalez (MEX); V Romero (MEX)	7	6
M Felder (URU); F Sansonetti (URU)	6^{4}	2

Semifinals
1	J Aguilar (CHI); A García (CHI)	6	6
4	S Gonzalez (MEX); V Romero (MEX)	3	1

=== Bottom half ===
First round
C Paiz (GUA); S Vidal (GUA)	6	6
R Arévalo (ESA); M Arévalo (ESA)	4	3

Second round
7	V Estrella (DOM); J García (DOM)	6^{7}	6	[10]
D Mullings (BAH); M Rolle (BAH)	7	3	[8]
E Campbell (JAM); D Pagon (JAM)	2	1
3	M Daniel (BRA); F Saretta (BRA)	6	6
5	M Quintero (COL); C Salamanca (COL)	6^{4}	7	[10]
LJ Cuellar (CUB); S Martínez (CUB)	7	6^{3}	[6]
C Paiz (GUA); S Vidal (GUA)	2	1
2	E Schwank (ARG); H Zeballos (ARG)	6	6

Quarterfinals
7	V Estrella (DOM); J García (DOM)	1	6	[11]
3	M Daniel (BRA); F Saretta (BRA)	6	3	[9]
5	M Quintero (COL); C Salamanca (COL)	2	4
2	E Schwank (ARG); H Zeballos (ARG)	6	6

Semifinals
7	V Estrella (DOM); J García (DOM)	1	0
2	E Schwank (ARG); H Zeballos (ARG)	6	6
