= Tennis at the 2007 Pan American Games – Women's singles =

Women's singles
- Tennis at the 2007 Pan American Games

Final
- Champion: Milagros Sequera (VEN)
- Runner-up: Mariana Duque Mariño (COL)
- Score: 3–6, 7–6^{(6–4)}, 6–1

Events
Singles	men	women
Doubles	men	women
← 2003 ·	Pan American Games	· 2011 →

The women's singles tournament in tennis at the 2007 Pan American Games was held at Marapendi Club in Rio de Janeiro from July 18 to July 22.

== Medalists ==
Gold	Milagros Sequera; Venezuela
Silver	Mariana Duque Mariño; Colombia
Bronze	Betina Jozami; Argentina

== Draw ==
=== Finals ===
Semifinals
1	Milagros Sequera (VEN)	1	6	6
Melissa Torres Sandoval (MEX)	6	0	4
7	Betina Jozami (ARG)	3	2
Mariana Duque Mariño (COL)	6	6

Finals
1	Milagros Sequera (VEN)	3	7^{7}	6
Mariana Duque Mariño (COL)	6	6^{4}	1
Bronze medal match
Melissa Torres Sandoval (MEX)	4	6^{4}
7	Betina Jozami (ARG)	6	7^{7}

=== Top half ===
First round
1	M Sequera (VEN)	6	6
V Castellvi (PUR)	2	2
M Morales (GUA)	7	7^{7}
C Arancibia (CHI)	5	6^{1}
K Castiblanco (COL)	2	0
Y Núñez (CUB)	6	6
A Cohen (USA)	5	6	6
6	M-È Pelletier (CAN)	7	4	1
3	J Cravero (ARG)	6	6
N Frazier (USA)	2	4
V Cepede (PAR)	1	0
J Cortez (BRA)	6	6
V Núñez (COL)	2	0
M Torres Sandoval (MEX)	6	6
M Giral Lores (VEN)	3	6	4
8	E Craciún (URU)	6	3	6

Second round
1	M Sequera (VEN)	6	6
M Morales (GUA)	1	2
Y Núñez (CUB)	6	7^{7}
A Cohen (USA)	4	6^{3}
3	J Cravero (ARG)	6	6
J Cortez (BRA)	2	4
M Torres Sandoval (MEX)	4	7^{9}	6
8	E Craciún (URU)	6	6^{7}	3

Quarterfinals
1	M Sequera (VEN)	6	6
Y Núñez (CUB)	3	1
3	J Cravero (ARG)	2	7	3
M Torres Sandoval (MEX)	6	5	6

Semifinals
1	M Sequera (VEN)	1	6	6
M Torres Sandoval (MEX)	6	0	4

=== Bottom half ===
First round
7	B Jozami (ARG)	7^{7}	6
M Falcon (USA)	6^{0}	4
MJ Arechavaleta (URU)	0	0
J Widjaja (BRA)	6	6
D Múñoz Gallegos (MEX)	1	7	1
Y Fors (CUB)	6	5	6
A Koch (CHI)	2	0
4	R de los Ríos (PAR)	6	6
5	K Brandi (PUR)	6	6
AW Andaluz (GUA)	2	0
M Miranda (CHI)	2	6	4
M Muci (VEN)	6	4	6
M Duque Mariño (COL)	6	6
E Clarke (MEX)	4	3
T Pereira (BRA)	3	6	0
2	A Wozniak (CAN)	6	0	6

Second round
7	B Jozami (ARG)	6	3	7
J Widjaja (BRA)	2	6	5
Y Fors (CUB)	7^{8}	3	7
4	R de los Ríos (PAR)	6^{6}	6	5
5	K Brandi (PUR)	6	6
M Muci (VEN)	2	0
M Duque Mariño (COL)	6	6
2	A Wozniak (CAN)	2	2

Quarterfinals
7	B Jozami (ARG)	6	4	6
Y Fors (CUB)	3	6	1
5	K Brandi (PUR)	7^{7}	5	0
M Duque Mariño (COL)	6^{0}	7	6

Semifinals
7	(Argentina) Jozami (ARG)	3	2
M Duque Mariño (COL)	6	6
