= Weightlifting at the 2007 Pan American Games – Men's 105 kg =

Weightlifting – Men's 105 kg at the 2007 Pan American Games
- Venue: Complexo Esportivo Riocentro
- Dates: 18 July 2007
- Competitors: 11 from 9 nations
- Winning total weight: 380 kg

Medalists
Gold medal	Joel Mackenzie	Cuba
Silver medal	Pedro Stetsiuk	Argentina
Bronze medal	Damián Abbiate	Argentina

The Men's 105 kg weightlifting event at the 2007 Pan American Games took place at the Complexo Esportivo Riocentro on 18 July 2007.

== Schedule ==
All times are Brasilia Time (UTC-3)

Date	Time	Event
18 July 2007	14:00	Group A

== Records ==
Prior to this competition, the existing world, Pan American and Games records were as follows:

World record	Snatch	Marcin Dołęga (POL)	199 kg	Władysławowo, Poland	7 May 2006
World record	Clean & Jerk	World Standard	242 kg	–	1 January 1998
World record	Total	World Standard	440 kg	–	1 January 1998
Pan American record	Snatch				
Pan American record	Clean & Jerk	Ernesto Montoya (CUB)	227 kg	Pinar del Río, Cuba	10 May 1998
Pan American record	Total				
Games record	Snatch	Boris Burov (ECU)	185 kg	Santo Domingo, Dominican Republic	16 August 2003
Games record	Clean & Jerk	Boris Burov (ECU)	215 kg	Winnipeg, Canada	8 August 1999
Games record	Total	Boris Burov (ECU)	397 kg	Winnipeg, Canada	8 August 1999

== Results ==
Rank	Athlete	Nation	Group	Body weight	Snatch (kg)					Clean & Jerk (kg)					Total
Rank	Athlete	Nation	Group	Body weight	1	2	3	Result	Rank	1	2	3	Result	Rank	Total
1st place, gold medalist(s)	Joel Mackenzie	Cuba	A	101.40	167	175	—	175	1	190	205	~~216~~	205	1	380
2nd place, silver medalist(s)	Pedro Stetsiuk	Argentina	A	102.45	~~160~~	160	~~165~~	160	2	~~180~~	180	~~184~~	180	5	340
3rd place, bronze medalist(s)	Damián Abbiate	Argentina	A	104.45	~~150~~	150	~~155~~	150	5	180	188	~~189~~	188	2	338
4	Bruno Brandão	Brazil	A	99.10	150	157	~~160~~	157	3	~~180~~	~~180~~	180	180	4	337
5	Christian López	Guatemala	A	104.70	153	~~158~~	~~158~~	153	4	~~182~~	~~182~~	182	182	3	335
6	Víctor Osorio	Chile	A	103.05	140	~~146~~	~~146~~	140	6	170	~~176~~	176	176	6	316
—	Ivorn Mcknee	Barbados	A	103.25	140	~~150~~	~~150~~	140	7	~~185~~	~~185~~	~~200~~	–	–	–
—	Boris Burov	Ecuador	A	100.40	~~170~~	–	–	–	–	–	–	–	–	–	–
—	Akos Sandor	Canada	A	104.95	~~150~~	~~150~~	~~150~~	–	–	–	–	–	–	–	–
—	Maycol Espinoza	Nicaragua	A	99.40	~~110~~	~~110~~	~~110~~	–	–	–	–	–	–	–	–
DSQ ^{1}	Fabrício Mafra	Brazil	A	100.75	146	151	~~154~~	151	—	175	187	~~188~~	187	—	338

^{1} Mafra originally won bronze medal, but was disqualified after he tested positive for abnormal levels of testosterone.
