= Tennis at the 2007 Pan American Games – Men's singles =

Men's singles
- Tennis at the 2007 Pan American Games

Final
- Champion: Flávio Saretta (BRA)
- Runner-up: Adrián García (CHI)
- Score: 6–3, 4–6, 7–6^{(7–2)}

Events
Singles	men	women
Doubles	men	women
- Pan American Games

The men's singles tournament in tennis at the 2007 Pan American Games was held at Marapendi Club in Rio de Janeiro from July 23 to July 28.

== Medalists ==
Gold	Flávio Saretta; Brazil
Silver	Adrián García; Chile
Bronze	Eduardo Schwank; Argentina

== Seeds ==
1. Flávio Saretta (BRA) (gold medalist)
2. Adrián García (CHI) (final, silver medalist)
3. Thiago Alves (BRA) (third round)
4. Marcos Daniel (BRA) (quarterfinals)
5. Horacio Zeballos (ARG) (second round)
6. Iván Miranda (PER) (quarterfinals)
7. Eduardo Schwank (ARG) (semifinals, bronze medalist)
8. Carlos Salamanca (COL) (third round)
9. Michael Quintero (COL) (semifinals, fourth place)
10. Marcel Felder (URU) (third round)
11. Juan-Martín Aranguren (ARG) (quarterfinals)
12. Jorge Aguilar (CHI) (third round)
13. Pablo González (COL) (second round)
14. Santiago González (MEX) (quarterfinals)
15. Víctor Romero (MEX) (second round)
16. Daniel Garza (MEX) (second round)

== Draw ==
=== Key ===
- INV = Tripartite Invitation
- IP = ITF place
- ALT = Alternate
- r = Retired
- w/o = Walkover

=== Finals ===
Quarterfinals
1	Flávio Saretta (BRA)	6	6
11	Juan-Martín Aranguren (ARG)	2	2
4	Marcos Daniel (BRA)	6	6^{3}	5
7	Eduardo Schwank (ARG)	2	7^{7}	7
9	Michael Quintero (COL)	6	6^{1}	6
14	Santiago González (MEX)	4	7^{7}	3
6	Iván Miranda (PER)	2	6^{5}
2	Adrián García (CHI)	6	7^{7}

Semifinals
1	Flávio Saretta (BRA)	3	7	6
7	Eduardo Schwank (ARG)	6	5	0
9	Michael Quintero (COL)	4	5
2	Adrián García (CHI)	6	7

Final (gold medal match)
1	Flávio Saretta (BRA)	6	4	7^{7}
2	Adrián García (CHI)	3	6	6^{2}
Bronze medal match
7	Eduardo Schwank (ARG)	6	6
9	Michael Quintero (COL)	4	0

=== Top half ===
==== Section 1 ====
First round
WC	D Pagon (JAM)	4	3
S Vidal (GUA)	6	6
M Doria-Medina (BOL)	1	0
R Arévalo (ESA)	6	6
F Sansonetti (URU)	6	6
S Martínez (CUB)	1	3
WC	Kristeper Elien (ISV)	1	3
Travis Helgeson (USA)	6	6

Second round
1	F Saretta (BRA)	6	6
S Vidal (GUA)	1	1
R Arévalo (ESA)	3	6	6
16	D Garza (MEX)	6	1	2
11	J-M Aranguren (ARG)	6	6
F Sansonetti (URU)	3	1
T Helgeson (USA)	6	0	4
8	C Salmanca (COL)	1	6	6

Third round
1	F Saretta (BRA)	6	6
R Arévalo (ESA)	2	3
11	J-M Aranguren (ARG)	7	6
8	C Salmanca (COL)	5	1

Quarterfinals
1	F Saretta (BRA)	6	6
J-M Aranguren (ARG)	2	2

==== Section 2 ====
First round
J Hernández (DOM)	3	4
R Winklaar (AHO)	6	6
R Recarte (VEN)	2	5
LJ Cuéllar (CUB)	6	7
H Lewis (BAR)	1	3
D Mullings (BAH)	6	6
WC	Keven Gardner (ANT)	1	2
J-C Ramirez (PAR)	6	6

Second round
4	M Daniel (BRA)	6	6
R Winklaar (AHO)	2	0
L J Cuéllar (CUB)	6	6
15	V Romero (MEX)	1	3
12	J Aguilar (CHI)	6	6
D Mullings (BAH)	4	3
J-C Ramirez (PAR)	2	3
7	E Schwank (ARG)	6	6

Third round
4	M Daniel (BRA)	6	6
L J Cuéllar (CUB)	1	4
12	J Aguilar (CHI)	3	6	2
7	E Schwank (ARG)	6	2	6

Quarterfinals
4	M Daniel (BRA)	6	6^{3}	5
7	E Schwank (ARG)	2	7^{7}	7

=== Bottom half ===
==== Section 3 ====
First round
G Hormazábal (CHI)	6	4	6
J Medina-Álvarez (VEN)	2	6	2
M Rolle (BAH)	2	2
S Bass (USA)	6	6
E Hernandez-Perez (CUB)	2	3
J García (DOM)	6	6
C Piaz (GUA)	6	6
M Date (BAH)	0	2

Second round
5	H Zeballos (ARG)	3	6	3
G Hormazábal (CHI)	6	4	6
S Bass (USA)	3	6^{0}
9	M Quintero (COL)	6	7^{7}
14	S González (MEX)	6	6
J García (DOM)	1	0
C Piaz (GUA)	6^{4}	3
3	T Alves (BRA)	7^{7}	6

Third round
9	G Hormazábal (CHI)	4	1
M Quintero (COL)	6	6
14	S González (MEX)	6	6
3	T Alves (BRA)	4	1

Quarterfinals
9	M Quintero (COL)	6	6^{1}	6
14	S González (MEX)	4	7^{7}	3

==== Section 4 ====
First round
T Paul (USA)	6	6
G Ramírez (PAR)	1	3
M Arévalo (ESA)	7	6
WC	E Heifield (ISV)	5	2
WC	C Bedminster (ANT)	2	2
Y Romero (VEN)	6	6
WC	E Campbell (JAM)	3	1
V Estrella (DOM)	6	6

Second round
6	I Miranda (PER)	7^{7}	6
T Paul (USA)	6^{5}	4
M Arévalo (ESA)	0	2
10	M Felder (URU)	6	6
13	P González (COL)	6	4	3
Y Romero (VEN)	2	6	6
V Estrella (DOM)	3	3
2	A García (CHI)	6	6

Third round
6	I Miranda (PER)	6	6
10	M Felder (URU)	0	4
Y Romero (VEN)	3	5
2	A García (CHI)	6	7

Quarterfinals
6	I Miranda (PER)	2	6^{5}
2	A García (CHI)	6	7^{7}
