= Tennis at the 2007 Pan American Games – Women's doubles =

Women's doubles
- Tennis at the 2007 Pan American Games

Final
- Champions: Jorgelina Cravero; (Argentina) Betina Jozami (ARG)
- Runners-up: Kari Castiblanco; (Colombia) Mariana Duque Mariño (COL)
- Score: 6–2, 6–4

Events
Singles	men	women
Doubles	men	women
- Pan American Games

The women's doubles tournament in tennis at the 2007 Pan American Games was played from July 18 to July 22. Jorgelina Cravero and Betina Jozami of Argentina were the champions.

== Medals ==
Gold	Jorgelina Cravero / Betina Jozami; Argentina
Silver	Kari Castiblanco / Mariana Duque Mariño; Colombia
Bronze	Joana Cortez / Teliana Pereira; Brazil

== Seeds ==
1. Jorgelina Cravero / Betina Jozami (ARG) (champions, gold medal)
2. Mariana Muci / Milagros Sequera (VEN) (quarterfinals)
3. Joana Cortez / Teliana Pereira (BRA) (semifinals, bronze medal)
4. Marie-Ève Pelletier / Aleksandra Wozniak (CAN) (quarterfinals)

== Draw ==
First round
V Cepede (Paraguay) R de los Ríos (PAR)	6	6
MJ Arechavaleta (Uruguay) E Craciún (URU)	3	2
4	M-È Pelletier (Canada) A Wozniak (CAN)	6	6
K Brandi (Puerto Rico) V Castellvi (PUR)	4	3
E Clarke (Mexico) M Torres Sandoval (MEX)	4	4
A Cohen (United States) M Falcon (USA)	6	6
M Morales (Guatemala) AW Andaluz (GUA)	1	2
Y Fors (Cuba) Y Núñez (CUB)	6	6
A Koch (Chile) M Miranda (CHI)	0	6	3
K Castiblanco (Colombia) M Duque Mariño (COL)	6	3	6

Quarterfinals
1	J Cravero (Argentina) B Jozami (ARG)	7	6
V Cepede (Paraguay) R de los Ríos (PAR)	5	3
4	M-È Pelletier (Canada) A Wozniak (CAN)	1	4
A Cohen (United States) M Falcon (USA)	6	6
Y Fors (Cuba) Y Núñez (CUB)	7	5	4
3	J Cortez (Brazil) T Pereira (BRA)	5	7	6
K Castiblanco (Colombia) M Duque Mariño (COL)	7	2	6
2	M Muci (Venezuela) M Sequera (VEN)	5	6	2

Semifinals
1	J Cravero (Argentina) B Jozami (ARG)	6	6
A Cohen (United States) M Falcon (USA)	3	3
3	J Cortez (Brazil) T Pereira (BRA)	6	3	2
K Castiblanco (Colombia) M Duque Mariño (COL)	2	6	6

Final
1	J Cravero (Argentina) B Jozami (ARG)	6	6
K Castiblanco (Colombia) M Duque Mariño (COL)	2	4
Bronze medal game
A Cohen (United States) M Falcon (USA)	5	0
3	J Cortez (Brazil) T Pereira (BRA)	7	6
