= Tennis at the 2007 Pan American Games =

- Date: 18–28 July
- Edition: 14
- Location: Marapendi Club

Champions

Men's singles
- Flávio Saretta (BRA)

Women's singles
- Milagros Sequera (VEN)

Men's doubles
- Horacio Zeballos / Eduardo Schwank (ARG)

Women's doubles
- Jorgelina Cravero / Betina Jozami (ARG)
- Pan American Games

Tennis at the 2007 Pan American Games was played at the Marapendi Club, which has previously hosted Davis Cup ties. Due to the 2007 Davis Cup, the men's competition was delayed one week. The women's events took place from July 18 to 22, while the men competed between July 23 and July 28.

== Medal summary ==
Event:	Gold	Silver	Bronze
Men
Men's singles	Flávio Saretta; Brazil	Adrián García; Chile	Eduardo Schwank; Argentina
Men's doubles	Horacio Zeballos / Eduardo Schwank; Argentina	Adrián García / Jorge Aguilar; Chile	Santiago González / Víctor Romero; Mexico
Women
Women's singles	Milagros Sequera; Venezuela	Mariana Duque Mariño; Colombia	Betina Jozami; Argentina
Women's doubles	Jorgelina Cravero / Betina Jozami; Argentina	Kari Castiblanco / Mariana Duque Mariño; Colombia	Joana Cortez / Teliana Pereira; Brazil

== Medal table ==
Place	Nation	Gold medal	Silver medal	Bronze medal	Total
1	Argentina	2	0	2	4
2	Brazil	1	0	1	2
3	Venezuela	1	0	0	1
4	Chile	0	2	0	2
5	Colombia	0	2	0	2
6	Mexico	0	0	1	1
Total		4	4	4	12
