= Water skiing at the 2007 Pan American Games =

Water skiing competitions at the 2007 Pan American Games in Rio de Janeiro was held from July 21 to July 24 at the Caiçaras Club.

Wakeboarding was added to the sports program, with the men's competition being contested.

== Medal summary ==
=== Medal table ===
* Host nation (Brazil)

Rank	Nation	Gold	Silver	Bronze	Total
1	Canada	5	3	1	9
2	United States	1	3	3	7
3	Brazil*	1	0	0	1
4	Colombia	0	1	0	1
5	Chile	0	0	2	2
6	Argentina	0	0	1	1
Totals (6 entries)		7	7	7	21

=== Medalists ===
==== Men's events ====
Event	Gold	Silver	Bronze
Tricks	Jaret Llewellyn; Canada	Cory Pickos; United States	Ryan Dodd; Canada
Slalom	Drew Ross; Canada	José Mesa; Colombia	Felipe Miranda; Chile
Jump	Jaret Llewellyn; Canada	Ryan Dodd; Canada	Rodrigo Miranda; Chile
Wakeboard	Marcelo Giardi; Brazil	Brad Buskas; Canada	Edgardo Martín; Argentina

==== Women's events ====
Event	Gold	Silver	Bronze
Tricks	Whitney McClintock; Canada	Mandy Nightingale; United States	Regina Jaquess; United States
Slalom	Whitney McClintock; Canada	Regina Jaquess; United States	Mandy Nightingale; United States
Jump	Regina Jaquess; United States	Whitney McClintock; Canada	Mandy Nightingale; United States
