= Weightlifting at the 2010 South American Games – Men's 105kg =

The Men's 105 kg event at the 2010 South American Games was held over March 29 at 18:00.

== Medalists ==
Gold	Silver	Bronze
Jorge David Valdez; Ecuador	Julio Luna; Venezuela	Leonel Albarran; Venezuela

== Results ==
Rank	Athlete	Bodyweight	Snatch			Clean & Jerk			Total
Rank	Athlete	Bodyweight	1	2	3	1	2	3	Total
1st place, gold medalist(s)	Jorge David Valdez (ECU)	100.61	163	170	175	182	190	200	375
2nd place, silver medalist(s)	Julio Luna (VEN)	102.12	160	~~165~~	165	~~206~~	206	~~211~~	371
3rd place, bronze medalist(s)	Leonel Albarran (VEN)	103.22	152	157	~~160~~	~~203~~	~~203~~	203	360
4	Emerson Burla (ARG)	103.30	135	142	147	171	176	~~180~~	323
5	Denny Robert Cabrera (BOL)	101.22	85	90	97	~~115~~	115	–	212
	Bruno Brandão (BRA)	104.19	155	~~160~~	~~160~~	~~183~~	~~191~~	~~191~~	DNF
	Jorge Eduardo Bustos (CHI)	103.81	~~135~~	~~135~~	~~135~~	160	170	177	DNF
	Pedro Stetsiuk (ARG)	104.33							DNS

== New Records ==
Sntach	175 kg	Jorge David Valdez (ECU)	GR
