= Roller sports at the 2007 Pan American Games =

Roller skating competitions at the 2007 Pan American Games in Rio de Janeiro will be held in July 2007 at the Miécimo da Silva Complex.

== Events ==
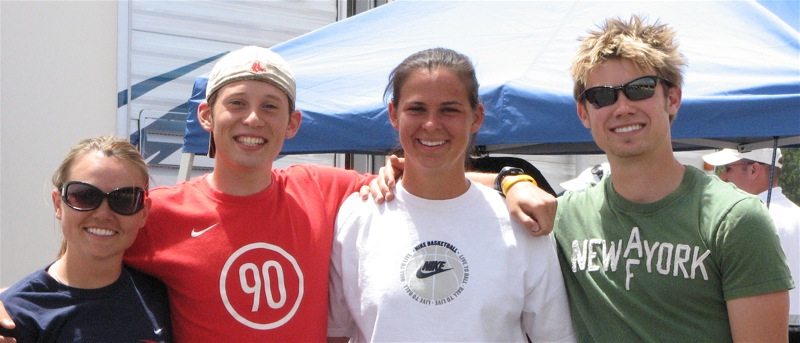
The United States roller skating team (left to right): Jessica Smith, Jonathan Garcia, Brittany Bowe, and Joey Mantia.

=== Men ===
Speed

Event	Gold	Silver	Bronze
Combined sprint	Joey Mantia; United States	Juan Jardines; Venezuela	Damian Fernandez; Argentina
Combined distance	Jorge Luis Cifuentes; Colombia	Javier Oyalvis; Venezuela	Jorge Bolanos; Ecuador

Artistic

Event	Gold	Silver	Bronze
Free skating	Marcel Stürmer; Brazil	Daniel Arriola; Argentina	Josh Rhoads; United States

=== Women ===
Speed

Event	Gold	Silver	Bronze
Combined sprint	Brittany Bowe; United States	Carolina Santibanez; Chile	Melisa Bonnet; Argentina
Combined distance	Jessica Smith; United States	Alexandra Vivas; Colombia	Silvina Posada; Argentina

Artistic

Event	Gold	Silver	Bronze
Free skating	Leila Vanzulli; Argentina	Abigail Burris; United States	Juliana Almeida; Brazil

== Medal table ==
* Host nation (Brazil)

Rank	Nation	Gold	Silver	Bronze	Total
1	United States	3	1	1	5
2	Argentina	1	1	3	5
3	Colombia	1	1	0	2
4	Brazil*	1	0	1	2
5	Venezuela	0	2	0	2
6	Chile	0	1	0	1
7	Ecuador	0	0	1	1
Totals (7 entries)		6	6	6	18
