= Weightlifting at the 2007 Pan American Games – Men's +105 kg =

Weightlifting – Men's +105 kg at the 2007 Pan American Games
- Venue: Complexo Esportivo Riocentro
- Dates: 18 July 2007
- Competitors: 6 from 6 nations
- Winning total weight: 401 kg

Medalists
Gold medal	Cristián Escalante	Chile
Silver medal	Casey Burgener	United States
Bronze medal	Victor Heredia	Venezuela

The Men's +105 kg weightlifting event at the 2007 Pan American Games took place at the Complexo Esportivo Riocentro on 18 July 2007.

== Schedule ==
All times are Brasilia Time (UTC-3)

Date	Time	Event
18 July 2007	18:00	Group A

== Records ==
Prior to this competition, the existing world, Pan American and Games records were as follows:

World record	Snatch	Hossein Rezazadeh (IRI)	213 kg	Qinhuangdao, China	14 September 2003
World record	Clean & Jerk	Hossein Rezazadeh (IRI)	263 kg	Athens, Greece	25 August 2004
World record	Total	Hossein Rezazadeh (IRI)	472 kg	Sydney, Australia	26 September 2000
Pan American record	Snatch	Shane Hamman (USA)	197 kg	Warsaw, Poland	26 November 2002
Pan American record	Clean & Jerk	Shane Hamman (USA)	237 kg	Athens, Greece	25 August 2004
Pan American record	Total	Shane Hamman (USA)	430 kg	Athens, Greece	25 August 2004
Games record	Snatch	Shane Hamman (USA)	175 kg	Winnipeg, Canada	8 August 1999
Games record	Clean & Jerk	Hidelgar Morillo (VEN)	210 kg	Santo Domingo, Dominican Republic	16 August 2003
Games record	Total	Shane Hamman (USA)	382 kg	Winnipeg, Canada	8 August 1999

The following records were established during the competition:

Snatch	177 kg	Cristián Escalante (CHI)	GR
Snatch	180 kg	Cristián Escalante (CHI)	GR
Clean & Jerk	211 kg	Julio Arteaga (ECU)	GR
Clean & Jerk	215 kg	Casey Burgener (USA)	GR
Clean & Jerk	221 kg	Cristián Escalante (CHI)	GR
Total	387 kg	Cristián Escalante (CHI)	GR
Total	392 kg	Casey Burgener (USA)	GR
Total	395 kg	Cristián Escalante (CHI)	GR
Total	401 kg	Cristián Escalante (CHI)	GR

== Results ==
Rank	Athlete	Nation	Group	Body weight	Snatch (kg)					Clean & Jerk (kg)					Total
Rank	Athlete	Nation	Group	Body weight	1	2	3	Result	Rank	1	2	3	Result	Rank	Total
1st place, gold medalist(s)	Cristián Escalante	Chile	A	125.15	170	177	180	180	1	207	215	221	221	1	401
2nd place, silver medalist(s)	Casey Burgener	United States	A	119.55	~~170~~	170	177	177	2	205	215	~~223~~	215	2	392
3rd place, bronze medalist(s)	Victor Heredia	Venezuela	A	123.45	161	166	~~170~~	166	3	206	211	215	215	3	381
4	Julio Arteaga	Ecuador	A	128.60	152	160	165	165	5	205	211	~~215~~	211	4	376
5	Lauri Blair	Brazil	A	122.40	160	165	~~170~~	165	4	~~200~~	200	~~209~~	200	5	365
6	Francisco Durán	Dominican Republic	A	174.10	~~150~~	150	~~162~~	150	6	175	185	~~195~~	185	6	335
