= Hernán Garcias =

Argentine futsal player and coach

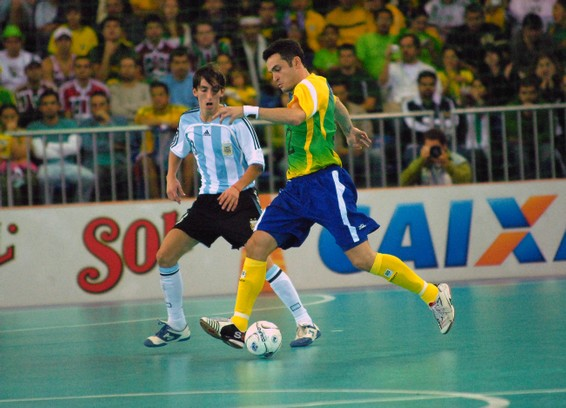
- Garcias in action wearing the Argentina jersey

Personal information
- Full name: Hernán José Garcias
- Date of birth: 2 June 1978 (age 48)
- Place of birth: Buenos Aires, Argentina
- Height: 1.77 m (5 ft 10 in)
- Position: Winger

Senior career*
Years	Team	Apps	(Gls)
- Fénix
- River Plate
2001	Torino		
2001–2006	Nepi		
2006–2007	Lazio Nepi		
2007–2012	Montesilvano		
2012–2014	Asti Calcio a 5		
2015	Boca Juniors		

International career
1998–2012	Argentina	100+	

Managerial career
- 2014–2015: Asti Calcio a 5 (assistant)
- 2016–2018: Boca Juniors
- 2019: Boca Juniors (coordinator)
- 2020–2024: Boca Juniors
- 2026–: United States
Medal record
Men's futsal
Representing Argentina Copa América
Gold medal – first place	Copa América	2003 Paraguay
Bronze medal – third place	Copa América	2008 Uruguay Pan American Games
Silver medal – second place	Pan American	2007 Rio de Janeiro
- * Club domestic league appearances and goals

Hernán José Garcias (born 2 June 1978) is an Argentine futsal coach and former player who is the head coach of the United States men's national futsal team. He played as an ala (winger) in the Argentine and Italian domestic leagues and for the Argentina national futsal team at four FIFA Futsal World Cup tournaments.

== Club career ==
Garcias began his career in Argentina with Fénix and River Plate. He moved to Italy in 2001, where he played for over a decade in Serie A with clubs including Torino, Nepi, Lazio Nepi, Montesilvano, and Asti Calcio a 5.

With Montesilvano, he won the Italian championship in 2009–10 and the UEFA Futsal Cup in 2010–11. With Asti, he won the Winter Cup in 2013–14.

He announced his retirement after the 2013–14 season but made a brief comeback with Boca Juniors in 2015.

== International career ==
Garcias represented the Argentina national futsal team from 1998 to 2012. He participated in four FIFA Futsal World Cups: 2000, 2004, 2008 and 2012.

He represented Argentina in five different Copa América de Futsal tournaments. He won in 2003 and earned a silver medal at the 2007 Pan American Games.

== Coaching career ==
Garcias began his transition to coaching during the 2014–15 season in Italy, leading Serie A side Club Asti Calcio to both the Coppa Italia and Winter Cup titles.

In 2016, Garcias returned to Argentina to take over as head coach and overall Futsal Manager for Boca Juniors, a role he maintained across two separate tenures from 2016 to 2018 and from 2020 to 2024. In his capacity as Futsal Manager, he oversaw the club's broader organizational infrastructure, which encompassed 36 teams and over 1,000 male and female athletes across youth and adult tiers, while additionally directing operations for Boca Juniors' men's and women's professional squads. The senior men's team won two Argentine Primera División titles (2017 and 2020) and three Supercopa Argentina championships (2018, 2022, and 2023), alongside securing qualification for the Copa Libertadores de Futsal in 2018 and 2022.

=== U.S. Soccer (2026–) ===
On 22 June 2026, the United States Soccer Federation announced the appointment of Garcias as the head coach of the United States men's national futsal team.

The appointment marked the first time in the 40-year history of the program that a head coach was hired on a full-time basis, with the federation tasking Garcias to oversee the national team cycle leading into the 2028 CONCACAF Futsal Championship and the subsequent FIFA Futsal World Cup.

== Honours ==
=== As player ===
==== Club ====
- Italian Championship: 1 (Montesilvano, 2009–10)
- UEFA Futsal Cup: 1 (Montesilvano, 2010–11)
- Winter Cup: 1 (Asti, 2013–14)

==== International ====
- Copa América: 1 (2003)
