= Boris Burov =

Ecuadorian weightlifter (born 1970)

Personal information
- Nationality: Ecuadorian
- Born: 1 August 1970 (age 55) Moscow, USSR

Sport
- Sport: Weightlifting
Medal record
Representing Ecuador
Pan American Games
Gold medal – first place	1999 Winnipeg	-105kg
Gold medal – first place	2003 Santo Domingo	-105kg

Boris Alexandrovich Burov (born 1 August 1970) is an Ecuadorian weightlifter. He competed in the men's heavyweight event at the 2000 Summer Olympics.
