= Mariana Duque Mariño =

Colombian tennis player (born 1989)

Mariana Duque
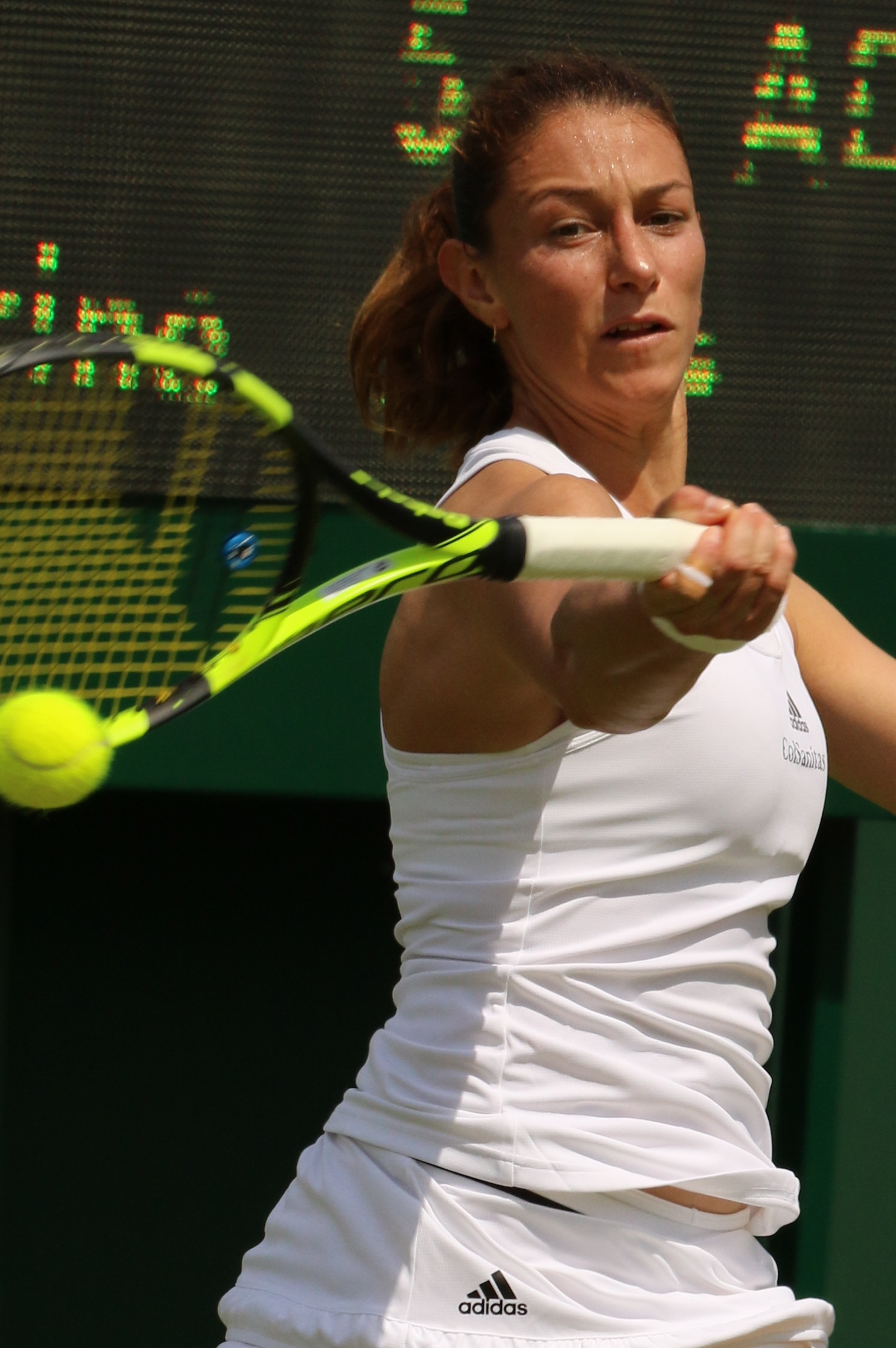
- Duque at the 2016 Wimbledon Championships
- Full name: Mariana Duque Mariño
- Country (sports): Colombia
- Residence: Bogotá, Colombia
- Born: 12 August 1989 (age 36) Bogotá
- Height: 1.69 m (5 ft 7 in)
- Turned pro: 2005
- Retired: 2019
- Plays: Right-handed (two-handed backhand)
- Coach: Emiliano Redondi
- Prize money: $1,936,260

Singles
- Career record: 431–284
- Career titles: 1
- Highest ranking: No. 66 (12 October 2015)

Grand Slam singles results
- Australian Open: 1R (2009, 2014, 2016, 2017, 2018)
- French Open: 3R (2017)
- Wimbledon: 2R (2013, 2015)
- US Open: 3R (2015)

Other tournaments
- Olympic Games: 1R (2012, 2016)

Doubles
- Career record: 161–93
- Career titles: 1
- Highest ranking: No. 96 (11 June 2018)

Grand Slam doubles results
- Australian Open: 1R (2016)
- Wimbledon: 2R (2016)
- US Open: 1R (2016)

Grand Slam mixed doubles results
- Wimbledon: QF (2016)

Team competitions
- BJK Cup: 42–22
Medal record
Representing Colombia
Women's tennis
Event	1st	2nd	3rd
Pan American Games	1	2	1
CAC Games	1	2	0
Total	2	4	1
Pan American Games
Gold medal – first place	2015 Toronto	Singles
Silver medal – second place	2007 Rio de Janeiro	Singles
Silver medal – second place	2007 Rio de Janeiro	Doubles
Bronze medal – third place	2011 Guadalajara	Doubles
Central American and Caribbean Games
Gold medal – first place	2018 Barranquilla	Team
Silver medal – second place	2018 Barranquilla	Singles
Silver medal – second place	2018 Barranquilla	Doubles

Mariana Duque Mariño (Spanish pronunciation: [maˈɾjana ˈðuke maˈriɲo]; (Note: In isolation, Duque is pronounced [ˈduke].) born 12 August 1989) is a Colombian former tennis player. Having turned professional in 2005, she reached a career-high singles ranking of world No. 66 in October 2015.

Duque debuted on the ITF Junior Circuit in 2004. As a junior, she reached the final of the girls' singles tournament at the 2007 French Open. She defeated the tenth-seeded Ksenia Pervak in the first round, and ousted juniors' world No. 1, Anastasia Pavlyuchenkova, in the semifinals. Duque lost in the final to Alizé Cornet in three sets. She had some setbacks during the tournament, due to losing her tennis rackets at the airport. Without money to buy replacements, she had to play with borrowed rackets.

She won her first professional tournament in May 2006, in Mazatlán, Mexico. Her biggest win in senior competition is defeating 26th seed Anna Chakvetadze in the opening round of the 2009 French Open, in three sets.

== Career ==
=== 2005–2006: Turning professional ===
In 2005, she appeared in her first WTA Tour qualifying in Bogotá and also played on the ITF Women's Circuit. In the 2005 Bolivarian Games, she won the silver medal in singles and in doubles.

Duque fell 2006 in the qualifying in Bogotá, won three singles and three doubles titles on the ITF Circuit.

=== 2007 ===
In her third full season on the tour, she arrived in the first round defeating compatriot Viky Núñez Fuentes and was beaten in the second by Flavia Pennetta. The same year, she won three singles titles on the ITF Circuit. At the Junior French Open, in her first appearance in a Grand Slam tournament, she finished runner-up, making history for Colombia as the first tennis player to reach such instance.

In Pan American Games, she arrived at the end confronting Venezuelan Milagros Sequera; the top-seed and favorite took home the gold medal for Venezuela and Mariana the silver medal, being one of the best achievements in her career. She also got the silver medal in doubles with compatriot Karen Castiblanco.

=== 2008 ===
At the US Open, Duque Mariño advanced to the second round by coming back to beat Tamarine Tanasugarn, ranked 19th in the world, after having lost the first set 0–6. In the second round, she lost in straight sets to Agnieszka Radwańska, ranked No. 9 in the world. Thanks to this presentation, she got into the top 100 players in the world for the first time by moving up two sports: 101 to 99.

She was also present at the WTA Tour event of Bogotá, where in the first round she confronted Jelena Kostanić Tošić, winning in straight sets. In the second round, she faced Yvonne Meusburger being the fifth seed in the tournament and against which Mariana Duque wins, in straight sets. In the quarterfinals, she confronted María Emilia Salerni to which Mariana fell in three sets.

In the first round of the Portugal Open, she won in straight sets against Monica Niculescu. In the second round, she fell to Karin Knapp who was seeded No. 3 in the tournament.

Duque Mariño won two singles titles and two doubles titles on the ITF Circuit.

=== 2010–2014 ===
Playing in her home country, Duque Mariño claimed her very first WTA Tour title at the Copa Colsanitas defeating Gréta Arn, Kristina Antoniychuk, seventh seed Klára Zakopalová, eighth seed Arantxa Parra Santonja, and fifth seed Angelique Kerber. Duque Mariño became the second Colombian woman to claim this title since Fabiola Zuluaga did it in 2004.

At the 2012 Summer Olympics, she competed in the women's singles, but was knocked out in the first round by Maria Kirilenko.

=== 2015: Gold at Pan Am Games, and career-high WTA ranking ===
On 11 through 16 July, Duque Mariño became the first Colombian tennis player to win a gold medal at the Pan American Games, defeating Mexico's Victoria Rodríguez in the final.

Duque Mariño reached for the first time in her career the third round of a Grand Slam championship at the US Open, where she beat American wildcard Sofia Kenin in the first round and Océane Dodin in the second. Duque is the second Colombian player to reach third round at the US Open, after Fabiola Zuluaga. In the third round, she faced former world No. 11, Roberta Vinci, and fell in three sets.

Duque Mariño kicked off the Asian swing at the Korea Open where she advanced to the second round defeating Kiki Bertens, before losing to fifth seed Mona Barthel, in straight sets. At the Wuhan Open, she qualified by defeating Casey Dellacqua and Christina McHale but failed to keep her momentum going when she lost to rising star Anna Karolína Schmiedlová, in straight sets. At the China Open, Duque Mariño breezed through qualifying by defeating wildcard Xu Yifan and Magda Linette both in straight sets. She set up a first-round match against former Wimbledon semifinalist Tsvetana Pironkova and defeated her in straight sets. She lost to eventual runner-up and No. 12 seed, Timea Bacsinszky. With her result at the China Open, Duque Mariño moved up the rankings to No. 66, making it her highest ranking.

=== 2016: Second WTA Tour final since 2010, and quarterfinals at Mallorca Open ===
Duque Mariño reached final at the Nürnberger Versicherungscup by defeating Carina Witthöft, Laura Siegemund, Varvara Lepchenko, and Annika Beck. She lost her final match against Kiki Bertens, in straight sets.

In June at the Mallorca Open, she defeated No. 134 Alison Van Uytvanck, and then 2013-Wimbledon finalist and ex-No. 12, Sabine Lisicki, in three sets. However, in the third round she lost to Anastasija Sevastova.

At the 2016 Summer Olympics in August, she lost in the first round of the singles draw to Angelique Kerber.

== Performance timelines ==
Key
W	F	SF	QF	#R	RR	Q#	DNQ	A	NH

(W) winner; (F) finalist; (SF) semifinalist; (QF) quarterfinalist; (#R) rounds 4, 3, 2, 1; (RR) round-robin stage; (Q#) qualification round; (DNQ) did not qualify; (A) absent; (NH) not held; (SR) strike rate (events won / competed); (W–L) win–loss record.

=== Singles ===
Tournament	2008	2009	2010	2011	2012	2013	2014	2015	2016	2017	2018	SR	W–L
Grand Slam tournaments
Australian Open	A	1R	A	Q1	Q1	Q1	1R	Q1	1R	1R	1R	0 / 5	0–5
French Open	A	2R	1R	A	Q1	2R	Q1	Q2	2R	3R	2R	0 / 6	6–6
Wimbledon	A	Q1	1R	A	Q1	2R	Q1	2R	1R	Q3	1R	0 / 5	2–5
US Open	2R	Q3	Q1	A	A	1R	Q2	3R	1R	Q3	Q1	0 / 4	3–4
Win–loss	1–1	1–2	0–2	0–0	0–0	2–3	0–1	3–2	1–4	2–2	1–3	0 / 20	11–20
National representation
Summer Olympics	A	Not Held			1R	Not Held			1R	NH		0 / 2	0–2
Premier M & 5
Dubai/Qatar	NP	A	A	A	A	A	A	A	A	A	A	0 / 0	0–0
Indian Wells	A	A	A	A	A	Q1	Q1	Q2	1R	2R	Q1	0 / 2	1–2
Miami Open	A	1R	Q2	A	A	A	Q1	Q1	Q1	Q2	Q1	0 / 1	0–1
Madrid Open	NH	1R	Q2	Q1	Q2	A	1R	2R	Q2	2R	A	0 / 4	2–4
Italian Open	A	1R	A	A	A	Q1	A	A	2R	Q2	A	0 / 2	1–2
Rogers Cup	A	A	A	A	A	A	A	1R	1R	1R		0 / 3	0–3
Cincinnati Open	A	A	Q1	A	A	Q1	A	Q2	Q2	Q2		0 / 0	0–0
Wuhan Open	Not Held						A	1R	A	A		0 / 1	0–1
China Open	NH	A	A	A	A	A	A	2R	A	A		0 / 1	1–1
Career statistics
Year-end ranking	110	191	128	190	140	101	137	75	107	103	112		

=== Doubles ===
Tournament	2012	2013	2014	2015	2016	2017	W–L
Grand Slam tournaments
Australian Open	A	A	A	A	1R	A	0–1
French Open	A	A	A	A	A	A	0–0
Wimbledon	Q1	Q2	Q1	A	2R	A	1–1
US Open	A	A	A	A	1R	A	0–1
Premier M & 5
Italian Open	A	2R	A	A	A	A	1–1
Career statistics
Year-end ranking	139	105	115	229	241	107	

== WTA Tour finals ==
=== Singles: 2 (1 title, 1 runner-up) ===
Legend Grand Slam WTA 1000 / Premier M & Premier 5 WTA 500 / Premier WTA 250 / International (1–1)	Finals by surface Hard Clay (1–1) Grass	Finals by setting Outdoor (1–1) Indoor

Result	W–L	Date	Tournament	Tier	Surface	Opponent	Score
Win	1–0	Feb 2010	Copa Colsanitas, Colombia	International (Note: The WTA International tournaments were reclassified as WTA 250 tournaments in 2021.)	Clay	(Germany) Angelique Kerber	6–4, 6–3
Loss	1–1	May 2016	Nuremberg Cup, Germany	International	Clay	(Netherlands) Kiki Bertens	2–6, 2–6

=== Doubles: 4 (1 title, 3 runner-ups) ===
Legend Grand Slam WTA 1000 / Premier M & Premier 5 WTA 500 / Premier WTA 250 / International (1–3)	Finals by surface Hard (0–1) Clay (1–2) Grass	Finals by setting Outdoor (1–3) Indoor

Result	W–L	Date	Tournament	Tier	Surface	Partner	Opponents	Score
Win	1–0	Jul 2012	Swedish Open, Sweden	International	Clay	(Colombia) Catalina Castaño	(Czech Republic) Eva Hrdinová (Bosnia and Herzegovina) Mervana Jugić-Salkić	4–6, 7–5, [10–5]
Loss	1–1	Mar 2013	Mexican Open, Mexico	International	Clay	(Colombia) Catalina Castaño	(Spain) Lourdes Domínguez Lino (Spain) Arantxa Parra Santonja	4–6, 6–7^{(1–7)}
Loss	1–2	Mar 2017	Mexican Open, Mexico	International	Hard	(Paraguay) Verónica Cepede Royg	(Croatia) Darija Jurak (Australia) Anastasia Rodionova	3–6, 2–6
Loss	1–3	Apr 2018	Copa Colsanitas, Colombia	International	Clay	(Argentina) Nadia Podoroska	(Slovenia) Dalila Jakupović (Russia) Irina Khromacheva	3–6, 4–6

== WTA Challenger finals ==
=== Doubles: 2 (2 titles) ===
Result	W–L	Date	Tournament	Surface	Partner	Opponents	Score
Win	1–0	Feb 2013	Copa Bionaire, Colombia	Clay	(Colombia) Catalina Castaño	(Argentina) Florencia Molinero (Brazil) Teliana Pereira	3–6, 6–1, [10–5]
Win	2–0	Jun 2018	Bol Open, Croatia	Clay	(China) Wang Yafan	(Spain) Sílvia Soler Espinosa (Czech Republic) Barbora Štefková	6–3, 7–5

== ITF Circuit finals ==
=== Singles: 28 (19 titles, 9 runner-ups) ===
Legend $100,000 tournaments $75/80,000 tournaments $50/60,000 tournaments $25,000 tournaments $10,000 tournaments	Finals by surface Hard (7–5) Clay (12–4)

Result	W–L	Date	Tournament	Tier	Surface	Opponent	Score
Win	1–0	Mar 2006	ITF Mazatlán, Mexico	10,000	Hard	(United States) Andrea Remynse	6–2, 6–4
Win	2–0	Mar 2006	ITF Los Mochis, Mexico	10,000	Clay	(Argentina) Agustina Lepore	6–2, 6–1
Loss	2–1	May 2006	ITF Monterrey, Mexico	10,000	Hard	(Argentina) Betina Jozami	3–6, 3–6
Loss	2–2	Aug 2006	ITF Bogotá, Colombia	10,000	Clay	(Argentina) Jesica Orselli	5–7, 3–6
Loss	2–3	Sep 2006	ITF Caracas, Venezuela	10,000	Hard	(United States) Story Tweedie-Yates	3–6, 3–6
Win	3–3	Sep 2006	ITF Caracas, Venezuela	10,000	Clay	(Argentina) Florencia Molinero	3–4 ret.
Loss	3–4	Mar 2007	ITF Toluca, Mexico	10,000	Hard	(Italy) Stella Menna	1–6, 5–7
Win	4–4	Mar 2007	ITF Xalapa, Mexico	10,000	Hard	(Argentina) Vanina García Sokol	6–3, 7–6
Win	5–4	Sep 2007	ITF Puerto Juárez, Mexico	25,000	Clay	(Argentina) Soledad Esperón	6–3, 7–5
Win	6–4	Oct 2007	ITF San Luis Potosí, Mexico	25,000	Hard	(Netherlands) Arantxa Rus	3–6, 6–4, 6–3
Win	7–4	May 2008	ITF Irapuato, Mexico	25,000	Hard	(Czech Republic) Nikola Fraňková	6–4, 3–6, 6–3
Win	8–4	Jul 2008	Open Seguros Bolívar, Colombia	25,000	Clay	(Bolivia) María Fernanda Álvarez Terán	6–0, 6–4
Loss	8–5	Feb 2010	Copa Bionaire, Colombia	75,000	Clay	(Slovenia) Polona Hercog	4–6, 7–5, 2–6
Win	9–5	Jul 2011	ITF Bogotá, Colombia	25,000	Clay	(Bolivia) María Fernanda Álvarez Terán	7–6^{(8)}, 4–6, 6–3
Win	10–5	Aug 2011	Reinert Open, Germany	25,000	Clay	(Germany) Scarlett Werner	7–6^{(7)}, 7–5
Loss	10–6	Sep 2011	Internazionale di Biella, Italy	100,000	Clay	(Romania) Alexandra Cadanțu	4–6, 3–6
Win	11–6	May 2012	Open Saint-Gaudens, France	50,000	Clay	(France) Claire Feuerstein	4–6, 6–3, 6–2
Win	12–6	Oct 2012	ITF Florence, United States	25,000	Hard	(Canada) Stéphanie Dubois	4–6, 6–2, 6–1
Loss	12–7	Nov 2012	John Newcombe Challenge, United States	50,000	Hard	(United States) Melanie Oudin	1–6, 1–6
Win	13–7	Mar 2013	Osprey Challenger, US	50,000	Clay	(Spain) Estrella Cabeza Candela	7–6^{(7)}, 6–1
Win	14–7	Apr 2013	ITF Pelham, US	25,000	Clay	(Japan) Kurumi Nara	1–6, 6–3, 6–4
Win	15–7	Oct 2013	ITF Rock Hill, US	25,000	Hard	(Georgia (country)) Anna Tatishvili	6–3, 6–4
Win	16–7	Jun 2014	ITF Stuttgart, Germany	25,000	Clay	(Germany) Carina Witthöft	5–7, 6–2, 6–2
Win	17–7	Oct 2014	Abierto Tampico, Mexico	50,000	Hard	(Belgium) An-Sophie Mestach	6–3, 1–6, 6–7^{(4)}
Loss	17–8	Jul 2017	Internazionale di Roma, Italy	60,000	Clay	(Ukraine) Kateryna Kozlova	6–7^{(6)}, 4–6
Loss	17–9	Apr 2018	Dothan Pro Classic, US	80,000	Clay	(United States) Taylor Townsend	2–6, 6–2, 1–6
Win	18–9	Apr 2018	Clay Court Classic, US	80,000	Clay	(Ukraine) Anhelina Kalinina	0–6, 6–1, 6–2
Win	19–9	Jun 2018	Hódmezővásárhely Ladies Open, Hungary	60,000	Clay	(Romania) Irina Bara	4–6, 7–5, 6–2

=== Doubles: 21 (14 titles, 7 runner-ups) ===
Legend $100,000 tournaments $50,000 tournaments $25,000 tournaments $10,000 tournaments	Finals by surface Hard (5–1) Clay (9–5) Carpet (0–1)

Result	W–L	Date	Tournament	Tier	Surface	Partner	Opponents	Score
Loss	0–1	Sep 2004	ITF Bogotá, Colombia	10,000	Clay	(Colombia) Viky Núñez Fuentes	(Ecuador) Estefania Balda Álvarez (Colombia) Karen Castiblanco	6–7^{(2)}, 5–7
Win	1–1	May 2006	ITF Los Mochis, México	10,000	Clay	(Colombia) Viky Núñez Fuentes	(Argentina) Agustina Lepore (Argentina) María Irigoyen	7–5, 6–3
Win	2–1	May 2006	ITF León, México	10,000	Hard	(Colombia) Viky Núñez Fuentes	(Mexico) Erika Clarke (United States) Courtney Nagle	7–6^{(3)}, 7–6^{(4)}
Loss	2–2	Aug 2006	ITF Bogotá, Colombia	10,000	Clay	(Colombia) Viky Núñez Fuentes	(Colombia) Karen Castiblanco (Brazil) Roxane Vaisemberg	4–6, 6–7^{(4)}
Win	3–2	Aug 2006	ITF Bogotá, Colombia	10,000	Clay	(Colombia) Viky Núñez Fuentes	(Argentina) Vanesa Furlanetto (Argentina) María Irigoyen	6–4, 6–2
Loss	3–3	May 2007	ITF Fuerteventura, Spain	25,000	Carpet	(Brazil) Roxane Vaisemberg	(Portugal) Neuza Silva (Netherlands) Nicole Thyssen	1–6, 2–6
Win	4–3	Jun 2008	Grado Tennis Cup, Italy	25,000	Clay	(Austria) Melanie Klaffner	(Mauritius) Marinne Giraud (Australia) Christina Wheeler	6–1, 6–2
Win	5–3	Jul 2008	ITF Bogotá, Colombia	25,000	Clay	(Colombia) Viky Núñez Fuentes	(Argentina) Mailen Auroux (Italy) Nicole Clerico	6–3, 6–4
Win	6–3	Oct 2010	ITF Rock Hill, US	25,000	Clay	(Brazil) Maria Fernanda Alves	(United States) Sanaz Marand (United States) Caitlin Whoriskey	6–1, 4–6, [10–4]
Loss	6–4	Jul 2011	ITF Bad Saulgau, Germany	25,000	Clay	(Colombia) Catalina Castaño	(Croatia) Maria Abramović (Italy) Nicole Clerico	3–6, 7–5, [7–10]
Loss	6–5	Nov 2012	John Newcombe Challenge, US	50,000	Hard	(Venezuela) Adriana Pérez	(Russia) Elena Bovina (Croatia) Mirjana Lučić-Baroni	3–6, 6–4, [8–10]
Win	7–5	Oct 2013	ITF Rock Hill, US	25,000	Hard	(Argentina) María Irigoyen	(United States) Allie Kiick (United States) Asia Muhammad	4–6, 7–6^{(5)}, [12–10]
Loss	7–6	Feb 2014	ITF São Paulo, Brazil	25,000	Clay	(Brazil) Paula Cristina Gonçalves	(Spain) Beatriz García Vidagany (Germany) Dinah Pfizenmaier	6–7, 6–4, [8–10]
Win	8–6	Jul 2014	Reinert Open, Germany	50,000	Clay	(Canada) Gabriela Dabrowski	(Paraguay) Verónica Cepede Royg (Liechtenstein) Stephanie Vogt	6–4, 6–2
Win	9–6	Sep 2014	ITF Juárez, México	25,000	Clay	(Brazil) Laura Pigossi	(Romania) Ioana Loredana Roșca (Slovakia) Lenka Wienerová	6–1, 3–6, [10–4]
Win	10–6	Oct 2014	Internacional de Monterrey, México	50,000	Hard	(Spain) Lourdes Domínguez Lino	(Belgium) Elise Mertens (Netherlands) Arantxa Rus	6–3, 7–6^{(4)}
Win	11–6	Nov 2014	John Newcombe Challenge, US	50,000	Hard	(Paraguay) Verónica Cepede Royg	(United States) Alexa Glatch (United States) Bernarda Pera	6–0, 6–3
Loss	11–7	Apr 2015	Open Medellín, Colombia	50,000	Clay	(Israel) Julia Glushko	(Spain) Lourdes Domínguez Lino (Luxembourg) Mandy Minella	5–7, 6–4, [5–10]
Win	12–7	May 2015	Open Saint-Gaudens, France	50,000	Clay	(Israel) Julia Glushko	(Brazil) Beatriz Haddad Maia (United States) Nicole Melichar	1–6, 7–6^{(5)}, [10–4]
Win	13–7	Feb 2017	ITF Surprise, US	25,000	Hard	(Argentina) Nadia Podoroska	(United States) Usue Maitane Arconada (United States) Sofia Kenin	4–6, 6–0, [10–5]
Win	14–7	Jul 2017	Hungarian Pro Open, Hungary	100,000	Clay	(Argentina) María Irigoyen	(Serbia) Aleksandra Krunić (Serbia) Nina Stojanović	7–6^{(3)}, 7–5

== Significant finals ==
=== Pan American Games ===
==== Singles: 2 (1 gold, 1 silver medal) ====
Result	W–L	Date	Location	Surface	Opponent	Score
Loss	0–1	2007	Rio de Janeiro	Hard	(Venezuela) Milagros Sequera	6–3, 6–7^{(4)}, 1–6
Win	1–1	2015	Toronto	Hard	(Mexico) Victoria Rodríguez	6–4, 6–4

==== Doubles: 2 (1 silver, 1 bronze medal) ====
Result	W–L	Date	Location	Surface	Partner	Opponents	Score
Loss	0–1	2007	Rio de Janeiro	Hard	(Colombia) Karen Castiblanco	(Argentina) Jorgelina Cravero (Argentina) Betina Jozami	2–6, 4–6
Win	1–1	2011	Guadalajara	Hard	(Colombia) Catalina Castaño	(Brazil) Teliana Pereira (Brazil) Vivian Segnini	6–7^{(2)}, 6–4, [10–7]

== Junior Grand Slam tournament finals ==
=== Singles: 1 (runner-up) ===
Result	Year	Tournament	Surface	Opponent	Score
Loss	2007	French Open	Clay	(France) Alizé Cornet	6–4, 1–6, 0–6

== Playing style ==
Duque-Mariño has a playing style similar to Gabriela Sabatini. Her serve has a more complicated motion than most women, but her athleticism allows her to keep the parts working together pretty smoothly. Her forehand is a heavy-topspin forehand that she hits at shoulder level while falling backward. The weakest, and the most un-Sabatini-like, element of Duque-Mariño's game is her backhand. She has a two-hander, and most of its power and spin is generated with her left hand. This makes the stroke a little flippy and rushed; for what is essentially her rally shot, it's not all that safe.

== Head to head ==
=== Record against top-10 players ===
Player	Record	Win%	Hard	Clay	Grass	Last match
Number 1 ranked players						
(Germany) Angelique Kerber	1–1	50%	1–0	0–1	0–0	Lost (3–6, 5–7) at 2016 Rio Olympics
(Serbia) Jelena Janković	0–1	0%	0–0	0–1	0–0	Lost (3–6, 2–6) at 2013 Copa Colsanitas
(Russia) Maria Sharapova	0–2	0%	0–1	0–1	0–0	Lost (1–6, 2–6) at 2015 Madrid Open
Number 2 ranked players						
(Poland) Agnieszka Radwańska	0–1	0%	0–1	0–0	0–0	Lost (0–6, 6–7^{(3)}) at 2011 Madrid Open
(Romania) Simona Halep	0–1	0%	0–0	0–1	0–0	Lost (3–6, 6–7^{(6)}) at 2016 Cincinnati Open
Number 3 ranked players						
(Russia) Nadia Petrova	0–1	0%	0–0	0–1	0–0	Lost (1–6, 2–6) at 2012 Family Circle Cup
Number 4 ranked players						
(Italy) Francesca Schiavone	0–1	0%	0–0	0–1	0–0	Lost (4–6, 6–4, 5–7) at 2016 Rio Open
Number 5 ranked players						
(Czech Republic) Lucie Šafářová	0–1	0%	0–0	0–1	0–0	Lost (6–3, 3–6, 3–6) at 2016 Prague Open
(Canada) Eugenie Bouchard	0–1	0%	0–0	0–1	0–0	Lost (3–6, 3–6) at 2013 Acapulco
Number 6 ranked players						
(Spain) Carla Suárez Navarro	0–2	0%	0–1	0–1	0–0	Lost (6–3, 1–6, 4–6) at 2007 ITF Gran Canaria
(Italy) Flavia Pennetta	0–3	0%	0–0	0–3	0–0	Lost (2–6, 6–3, 1–6) at 2013 Swedish Open
Number 7 ranked players						
(Italy) Roberta Vinci	0–2	0%	0–1	0–1	0–0	Lost (1–6, 7–5, 2–6) at 2015 US Open
(France) Marion Bartoli	0–1	0%	0–0	0–1	0–0	Lost (6–7^{(5)}, 5–7) at 2013 French Open
Number 9 ranked players						
(United States) Madison Keys	0–1	0%	0–0	0–1	0–0	Lost (6–3, 6–2) at 2016 Miami
(Germany) Andrea Petkovic	0–1	0%	0–0	0–0	0–1	Lost (3–6, 1–6) at 2015 French Open
(Switzerland) Timea Bacsinszky	1–3	25%	0–1	1–1	0–1	Lost (5–7, 2–6) at 2015 China Open
Number 10 ranked players						
(Russia) Maria Kirilenko	0–1	0%	0–0	0–0	0–1	Lost (0–6, 1–1 ret.) at 2012 London Olympics
(Slovakia) Dominika Cibulková	0–1	0%	0–1	0–0	0–0	Lost (2–6, 2–6) at 2016 Rogers Cup
Total	2–25	7%	1–6	1–16	0–3	
