= Pedro Stetsiuk =

Ukrainian-born Argentine weightlifter

Personal information
- Nationality: Argentine
- Born: 17 November 1980 (age 45) Lviv, Ukrainian SSR, Soviet Union
- Weight: 104 kg (229 lb)

Sport
- Sport: Weightlifting
- Event: 105 kg
Medal record
Men's weightlifting
Representing Argentina
Pan American Games
Silver medal – second place	2007 Rio de Janeiro	105 kg

Pedro Stetsiuk (born 17 November 1980) is a Ukrainian born Argentine weightlifter. His best result was the silver medal at the 2007 Pan American Games at the men's 105 kg event.

== Major results ==
Year	Venue	Weight	Snatch (kg)				Clean & Jerk (kg)				Total	Rank
Year	Venue	Weight	1	2	3	Rank	1	2	3	Rank	Total	Rank
Representing Argentina
Pan American Games
2011	Guadalajara, Mexico	105 kg	150	158	~~166~~	6	~~180~~	180	~~187~~	7	338	7
2007	Rio de Janeiro, Brazil	105 kg	~~160~~	160	~~165~~	2	~~180~~	180	~~184~~	5	340	2nd place, silver medalist(s)
Pan American Championships
2009	Chicago, United States	105 kg	~~160~~	~~160~~	~~160~~	—	181	~~192~~	~~192~~	6	—	—
2008	Callao, Peru	105 kg	~~150~~	150	155	3rd place, bronze medalist(s)	171	182	~~191~~	3rd place, bronze medalist(s)	337	4

== Personal life ==
Stetsiuk was born in Lviv at the Soviet Union, from Ukrainian father and Argentine mother. In 1993 the family moved to Argentina. From 2001 Stetsiuk lived in the United States until beginning of 2007, when he back to Argentina.
