= Adrián García (tennis) =

Chilean tennis player

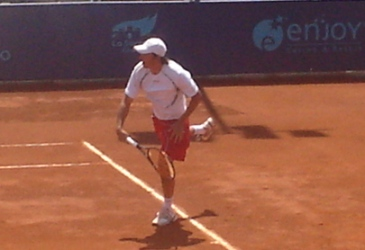
- Country (sports): Chile
- Born: May 25, 1978 (age 47) Concepción, Chile
- Height: 1.75 m (5 ft 9 in)
- Turned pro: 1998
- Retired: 2011
- Plays: Right-handed
- Prize money: US$ 605,753

Singles
- Career record: 13–28 (at ATP Tour level, Grand Slam level and in Davis Cup)
- Career titles: 0
- Highest ranking: No. 103 (13 September 2004)

Grand Slam singles results
- Australian Open: Q2 (2005)
- French Open: Q1 (2007)
- Wimbledon: 1R (2005)
- US Open: Q3 (2007)

Doubles
- Career record: 12–23 (at ATP Tour level, Grand Slam level and in Davis Cup)
- Career titles: 0
- Highest ranking: No. 124 (23 April 2007)
Medal record
Representing Chile
Pan American Games
Silver medal – second place	2003 Santo Domingo	Men's doubles
Silver medal – second place	2007 Rio de Janeiro	Men's singles
Silver medal – second place	2007 Rio de Janeiro	Men's doubles

Adrián Alonso García Sobarzo (born May 25, 1978) is a former professional tennis player from Chile.

Born in Concepción, Chile, García achieved a career-high singles ranking of world No. 103 in September 2004. His best achievement in singles was reaching the quarterfinals of the 2004 Sopot Open, where he lost to Félix Mantilla in straight sets.

García also achieved three silver medals in the Pan American Games during his career: one at Santo Domingo 2003 and two at Rio de Janeiro 2007.

== Performance timeline ==
Key
W	F	SF	QF	#R	RR	Q#	DNQ	A	NH

(W) winner; (F) finalist; (SF) semifinalist; (QF) quarterfinalist; (#R) rounds 4, 3, 2, 1; (RR) round-robin stage; (Q#) qualification round; (DNQ) did not qualify; (A) absent; (NH) not held; (SR) strike rate (events won / competed); (W–L) win–loss record.

=== Singles ===
Tournament	2000	2001	2002	2003	2004	2005	2006	2007	2008	SR	W–L	Win%
Grand Slam tournaments
Australian Open	A	A	A	A	A	Q2	Q1	A	A	0 / 0	0–0	–
French Open	A	A	A	A	A	A	A	Q1	A	0 / 0	0–0	–
Wimbledon	Q1	Q1	A	A	Q1	1R	Q2	A	A	0 / 1	0–1	0%
US Open	Q2	A	A	A	Q2	Q2	A	Q3	A	0 / 0	0–0	–
Win–loss	0–0	0–0	0–0	0–0	0–0	0–1	0–0	0–0	0–0	0 / 1	0–1	0%
ATP Tour Masters 1000
Indian Wells	A	A	A	A	A	A	Q2	Q1	Q1	0 / 0	0–0	–
Miami	A	A	A	A	A	Q2	Q1	A	A	0 / 0	0–0	–
Rome Masters	A	A	A	A	A	A	A	A	Q1	0 / 0	0–0	–
Win–loss	0–0	0–0	0–0	0–0	0–0	0–0	0–0	0–0	0–0	0 / 0	0–0	100%

== ATP Challenger and ITF Futures finals ==
=== Singles: 23 (11–12) ===
Legend ATP Challenger (3–8) ITF Futures (8–4)	Finals by surface Hard (1–1) Clay (10–11) Grass (0–0) Carpet (0–0)

Result	W–L	Date	Tournament	Tier	Surface	Opponent	Score
Win	1–0	Sep 1999	Peru F1, Arequipa	Futures	Clay	(Brazil) Júlio Silva	7–5, 6–1
Loss	1–1	Oct 1999	Paraguay F2, Asunción	Futures	Clay	(Argentina) Diego Moyano	3–6, 4–6
Win	2–1	Dec 1999	Chile F6, Santiago	Futures	Clay	(Italy) Leonardo Azzaro	3–6, 6–0, 6–2
Loss	2–2	May 2000	Chile F6, Santiago	Futures	Clay	(Argentina) Sergio Roitman	3–6, 3–6
Win	3–2	Oct 2002	Chile F4, Santiago	Futures	Clay	(Argentina) Francisco Cabello	3–6, 6–3, 6–3
Win	4–2	Oct 2002	Chile F6, Santiago	Futures	Clay	(Chile) Sergio Elias-Musalem	7–5, 7–5
Win	5–2	Sep 2003	Mexico City, Mexico	Challenger	Hard	(Mexico) Santiago González	7–5, 6–3
Loss	5–3	Jan 2004	São Paulo, Brazil	Challenger	Hard	(Argentina) Juan Mónaco	4–6, 6–7^{(4–7)}
Loss	5–4	Mar 2004	Bogotá, Colombia	Challenger	Clay	(Colombia) Alejandro Falla	6–4, 1–6, 2–6
Loss	5–5	Mar 2004	Mexico City, Mexico	Challenger	Clay	(Germany) Florian Mayer	4–6, 3–6
Win	6–5	May 2004	Zagreb, Croatia	Challenger	Clay	(Spain) Rubén Ramírez Hidalgo	6–3, 7–5
Loss	6–6	Jan 2005	Santiago, Chile	Challenger	Clay	(Germany) Tomas Behrend	6–7^{(3–7)}, 6–4, 2–6
Win	7–6	May 2005	Ettlingen, Germany	Challenger	Clay	(Spain) Marc López	6–4, 6–4
Loss	7–7	Jul 2005	Poznań, Poland	Challenger	Clay	(Russia) Teymuraz Gabashvili	4–6, 2–6
Loss	7–8	Aug 2006	Manerbio, Italy	Challenger	Clay	(Sweden) Andreas Vinciguerra	6–7^{(3–7)}, 1–6
Loss	7–9	Apr 2007	Mexico City, Mexico	Challenger	Clay	(Paraguay) Ramón Delgado	3–6, 3–6
Loss	7–10	May 2007	Forest Hills, United States	Challenger	Clay	(United States) Paul Goldstein	walkover
Win	8–10	Aug 2008	Germany F16, Wahlstedt	Futures	Clay	(Portugal) Leonardo Tavares	6–3, 4–6, 6–0
Win	9–10	Aug 2008	Germany F17, Überlingen	Futures	Clay	(Germany) Dieter Kindlmann	6–1, 6–2
Win	10–10	Sep 2008	Germany F18, Kempten	Futures	Clay	(Germany) Julian Reister	6–2, 5–7, 6–3
Win	11–10	Nov 2009	Chile F6, Concepción	Futures	Clay	(Argentina) Agustin Picco	6–3, 6–2
Loss	11–11	May 2010	Poland F2, Kraków	Futures	Clay	(Czech Republic) Dušan Lojda	2–6, 5–7
Loss	11–12	Jun 2010	Poland F3, Koszalin	Futures	Clay	(Poland) Jerzy Janowicz	7–6^{(7–2)}, 3–6, 3–6

=== Doubles: 27 (13–14) ===
Legend ATP Challenger (7–8) ITF Futures (6–6)	Finals by surface Hard (2–1) Clay (11–13) Grass (0–0) Carpet (0–0)

Result	W–L	Date	Tournament	Tier	Surface	Partner	Opponents	Score
Loss	0–1	Aug 1998	Ecuador F2, Quito	Futures	Clay	(Chile) Raúl Valdés	(Brazil) Pedro Braga (Colombia) Juan-Camilo Gamboa	6–3, 4–6, 4–6
Win	1–1	Oct 1999	Bolivia F2, Cochabamba	Futures	Clay	(Chile) Jaime Fillol Jr.	(Argentina) Rodrigo Pena (Argentina) Sergio Roitman	6–3, 4–6, 6–3
Loss	1–2	Oct 1999	Bolivia F3, Santa Cruz	Futures	Clay	(Chile) Jaime Fillol Jr.	(Argentina) Martín Vassallo Argüello (Argentina) Walter Grinovero	2–6, 0–6
Win	2–2	Oct 1999	Paraguay F2, Asunción	Futures	Clay	(Chile) Jaime Fillol Jr.	(Argentina) Daniel Caracciolo (Hungary) Gergely Kisgyörgy	4–6, 6–0, 6–1
Win	3–2	Nov 1999	Chile F3, Valparaíso	Futures	Clay	(Chile) Jaime Fillol Jr.	(Argentina) Daniel Caracciolo (Chile) Luis Hormazábal	6–3, 2–6, 6–4
Win	4–2	Dec 1999	Chile F6, Santiago	Futures	Clay	(Chile) Jaime Fillol Jr.	(Argentina) Daniel Caracciolo (Argentina) Ignacio González King	walkover
Loss	4–3	May 2000	Chile F6, Santiago	Futures	Clay	(Chile) Jaime Fillol Jr.	(Argentina) Juan Pablo Guzmán (Chile) Sebastian Contador	6–3, 4–6, 1–6
Win	5–3	Dec 2000	San Jose, Costa Rica	Challenger	Hard	(Argentina) Guillermo Cañas	(United States) Devin Bowen (United States) Brandon Coupe	7–6^{(7–5)}, 6–1
Loss	5–4	Jun 2002	Eisenach, Germany	Challenger	Clay	(Brazil) Marcos Daniel	(Netherlands) Edwin Kempes (Netherlands) Martin Verkerk	3–6, 4–6
Win	6–4	Jul 2002	Budaörs, Hungary	Challenger	Clay	(Chile) Hermes Gamonal	(Czech Republic) Jiří Vaněk (Czech Republic) Robin Vik	6–3, 0–6, 6–3
Loss	6–5	Oct 2002	Chile F4, Santiago	Futures	Clay	(Argentina) Francisco Cabello	(Brazil) Márcio Carlsson (Sweden) Robert Lindstedt	3–6, ret.
Loss	6–6	Nov 2002	Mexico F17, Zacatecas	Futures	Hard	(Argentina) Ignacio González King	(Mexico) Bruno Echagaray (Mexico) Santiago González	6–7^{(0–7)}, 1–6
Loss	6–7	Apr 2003	Chile F1, Santiago	Futures	Clay	(Argentina) Francisco Cabello	(Argentina) Patricio Arquez (Argentina) Sebastián Decoud	2–6, 6–7^{(6–8)}
Win	7–7	Apr 2003	Chile F3, Santiago	Futures	Clay	(Argentina) Francisco Cabello	(Chile) Paul Capdeville (Spain) David Marrero	6–3, 6–1
Loss	7–8	May 2004	Turin, Italy	Challenger	Clay	(Chile) Hermes Gamonal	(Italy) Leonardo Azzaro (Italy) Giorgio Galimberti	1–6, 3–6
Win	8–8	Jun 2004	Furth, Germany	Challenger	Clay	(Serbia and Montenegro) Janko Tipsarević	(United States) Graydon Oliver (Sweden) Simon Aspelin	6–4, 6–4
Loss	8–9	Aug 2004	San Marino, San Marino	Challenger	Clay	(Spain) Álex López Morón	(Italy) Massimo Bertolini (Belgium) Tom Vanhoudt	2–6, 4–6
Loss	8–10	Jul 2005	Poznań, Poland	Challenger	Clay	(Italy) Tomas Tenconi	(Poland) Łukasz Kubot (Poland) Filip Urban	7–6^{(7–5)}, 3–6, 2–6
Loss	8–11	Oct 2005	Quito, Ecuador	Challenger	Clay	(Chile) Paul Capdeville	(United States) Hugo Armando (United States) Glenn Weiner	3–6, 1–6
Win	9–11	Jul 2006	Montauban, France	Challenger	Clay	(Uruguay) Pablo Cuevas	(France) Marc Gicquel (France) Édouard Roger-Vasselin	6–3, 4–6, [10–8]
Loss	9–12	Sep 2006	Kranj, Slovenia	Challenger	Clay	(Argentina) Damián Patriarca	(Spain) Antonio Baldellou-Esteva (Spain) Héctor Ruiz-Cadenas	6–0, 2–6, [7–10]
Win	10–12	Jan 2007	São Paulo, Brazil	Challenger	Hard	(Uruguay) Pablo Cuevas	(Brazil) Marcelo Melo (Brazil) Alexandre Simoni	6–4, 6–2
Loss	10–13	Oct 2007	Belo Horizonte, Brazil	Challenger	Clay	(Argentina) Leonardo Mayer	(Spain) Marcel Granollers (Spain) Santiago Ventura	3–6, 3–6
Loss	10–14	Nov 2007	Asunción, Paraguay	Challenger	Clay	(Spain) Bartolomé Salvá Vidal	(Argentina) Martín Vassallo Argüello (Argentina) Carlos Berlocq	5–7, 7–6^{(7–5)}, [11–13]
Win	11–14	Apr 2008	Florianópolis, Brazil	Challenger	Clay	(Argentina) Leonardo Mayer	(Brazil) Thomaz Bellucci (Brazil) Bruno Soares	6–2, 6–0
Win	12–14	Jun 2009	Constanța, Romania	Challenger	Clay	(Spain) David Marrero	(Romania) Adrian Cruciat (Romania) Florin Mergea	7–6^{(7–5)}, 6–2
Win	13–14	May 2010	Poland F1, Katowice	Futures	Clay	(Chile) Hans Podlipnik Castillo	(Russia) Denis Matsukevich (Chile) Cristóbal Saavedra Corvalán	7–5, 7–5

=== Team competitions (3 runner-ups) ===
Singles

Result	Date	Championship	Surface	Opponent	Score
Loss	Jul 2007	Pan American Games, Rio de Janeiro, Brazil	Clay	(Brazil) Flávio Saretta	3–6, 6–4, 6–7^{(2–7)}

Doubles

Result	Date	Championship	Surface	Partner	Opponents	Score
Loss	Aug 2003	Pan American Games; Santo Domingo, Dominican Republic	Hard	(Chile) Marcelo Ríos	(Mexico) Santiago González (Mexico) Alejandro Hernández	7–6^{(7–5)}, 2–6, 3–6
Loss	Jul 2007	Pan American Games; Rio de Janeiro, Brazil	Clay	(Chile) Jorge Aguilar	(Argentina) Eduardo Schwank (Argentina) Horacio Zeballos	3–6, 4–6
