= Federico Sansonetti =

Uruguayan tennis player

Federico Sansonetti Anker
- Country (sports): Uruguay
- Residence: Montevideo, Uruguay
- Born: 6 November 1986 (age 38); Montevideo, Uruguay
- Plays: Right-handed (one-handed backhand)
- Prize money: $22,423

Singles
- Career record: 5–5
- Career titles: 0
- Highest ranking: No. 525 (10 December 2009)
- Current ranking: No. 853 (6 September 2010)

Grand Slam singles results
- Australian Open: -
- French Open: -
- Wimbledon: -
- US Open: -

Doubles
- Career titles: 0

Grand Slam doubles results
- Australian Open: -
- French Open: -
- Wimbledon: -
- US Open: -
- Last updated on: July 27, 2009.

Federico Sansonetti Anker (born 6 November 1986) is a Uruguayan professional tennis player.

== ATP Tournaments Finals ==
=== Runner-Up (2) ===
Legend
ITF Futures Series

No.	Date	Tournament	Surface	Opponent in the final	Score in the final
1.	06.10.2008	Chile F1, Chile	Clay	(Chile) Jorge Aguilar	2–6, 1–6
2.	13.10.2008	Chile F2, Chile	Clay	(Chile) Jorge Aguilar	2–6, 2–6
