= Betina Jozami =

Argentine tennis player

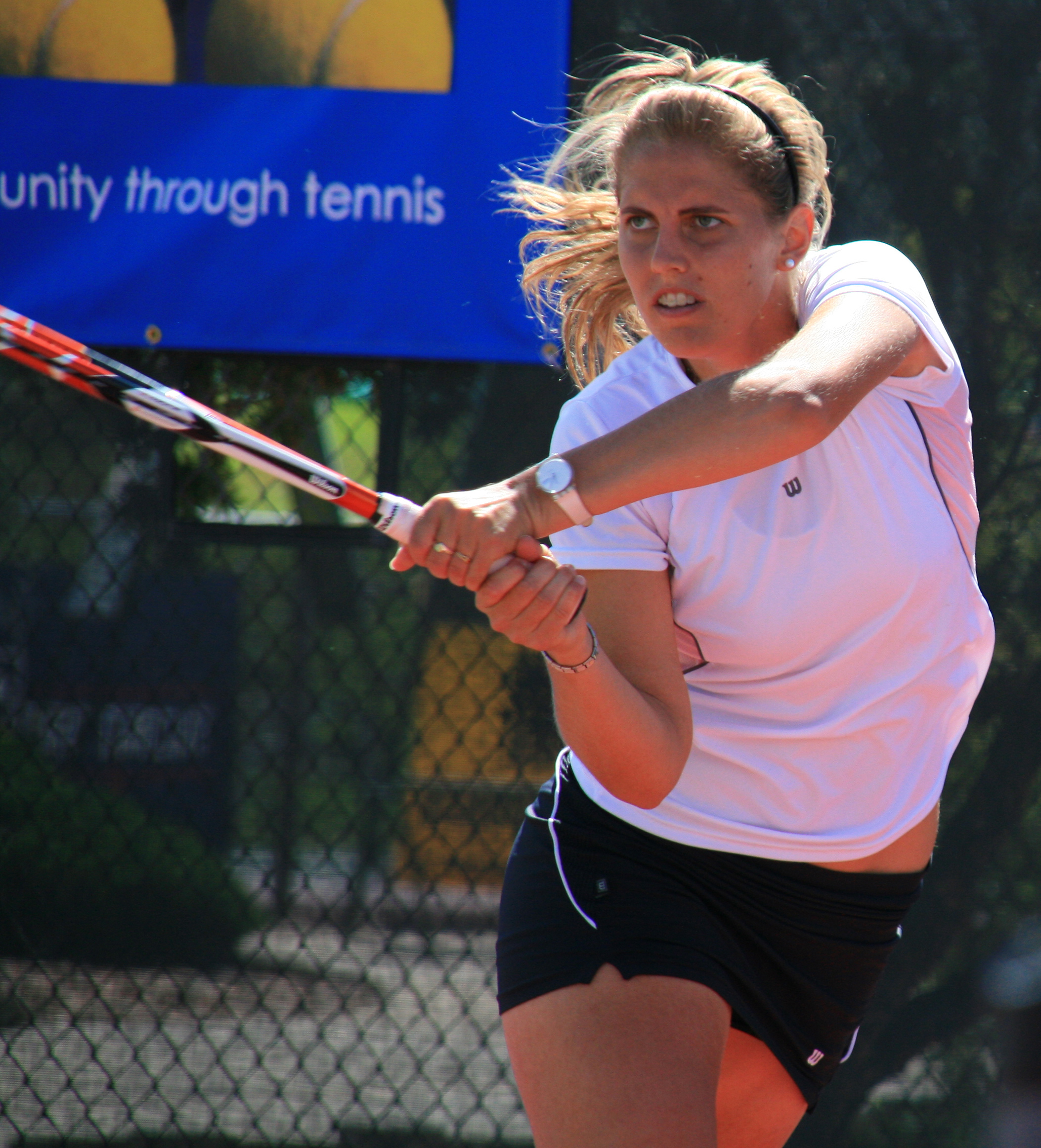
- Betina at Albuquerque, 2008
- Country (sports): Argentina
- Born: 8 September 1988 (age 37) Paraná, Argentina
- Height: 1.80 m (5 ft 11 in)
- Retired: 2011
- Plays: Right-handed (two-handed backhand)
- Prize money: $155,059

Singles
- Career record: 153–115
- Career titles: 7 ITF
- Highest ranking: No. 132 (9 February 2009)

Grand Slam singles results
- Australian Open: Q3 (2009)
- French Open: Q3 (2008)
- Wimbledon: Q1 (2007–2008)
- US Open: Q1 (2007, 2008, 2009)

Doubles
- Career record: 153–82
- Career titles: 15 ITF
- Highest ranking: No. 96 (19 May 2008)

Grand Slam doubles results
- Wimbledon: 1R (2008)

Betina Jozami (born 8 September 1988) is a retired tennis player from Argentina. In her career, she won seven singles and 15 doubles titles on the ITF Circuit.

Jozami participated at the 2007 Pan American Games where she won the gold medal with Jorgelina Cravero in doubles and the bronze medal in singles. She also represented her country at the 2008 Summer Olympics. Betina has a degree on Business Administration.

== Career ==
Betina started playing tennis when she was eight years in Paraná, her hometown, at the Urquiza Tennis Club with her coach Alejandro Rudi. She comes from a sports family of Lebanese descent.

She represented her country in several occasions, the South American Tournament in 2000, the Orange Bowl in 2003, and the Junior Davis Cup in 2004.

Betina obtained the gold medal in doubles with Jorgelina Cravero, and the bronze medal in singles at the 2007 Pan American Games.

In 2008, Betina managed to access the second round of doubles at the 2008 Summer Olympics with Gisela Dulko. Betina also represented her country in Fed Cup competition (win/loss record 2–4).

In addition to her sports career, Betina is business administrator graduated in the University of San Martín.

She represented the University of San Martin and the Argentine National Team of Tennis at the 2011 Summer Universiade in Shenzhen, China where she met her current husband Emerson Burla. Two years later, they represented their country at the 2013 Universiade in Kazan, Russia.

Between 2015 and 2017, she lived and worked as a consultant in Mexico City. During this period, Betina held a tennis exhibition with Andy Roddick, Melisa Torres and James Blake.

Currently, she works at Weymouth Club as a High Performance Coach and as a freelance in the field of eCommerce. Since 2018, Betina has resided in Boston, Massachusetts.

== ITF Circuit finals ==
$100,000 tournaments
$75,000 tournaments
$50,000 tournaments
$25,000 tournaments
$10,000 tournaments

=== Singles: 10 (7 titles, 3 runner-ups) ===
Outcome	No.	Date	Tournament	Surface	Opponent	Score
Runner-up	1.	27 July 2003	ITF Puerto Ordaz, Venezuela	Hard	(Czech Republic) Zuzana Černá	0–6, 0–6
Runner-up	2.	12 September 2004	ITF Santiago, Chile	Clay	(Argentina) María José Argeri	4–6, 5–7
Winner	3.	28 May 2006	ITF Monterrey, Mexico	Hard	(Colombia) Mariana Duque	6–3, 6–3
Winner	4.	4 June 2006	ITF León, Mexico	Hard	(Argentina) Agustina Lepore	6–3, 6–1
Runner-up	5.	23 July 2006	ITF Campos do Jordão, Brazil	Hard	(Argentina) María José Argeri	6–4, 2–6, 3–6
Winner	6.	17 September 2006	ITF Tampico, Mexico	Hard	(Mexico) Daniela Múñoz Gallegos	6–3, 6–0
Winner	7.	24 September 2006	ITF Guadalajara, Mexico	Clay	(Uruguay) Estefanía Craciún	6–3, 6–4
Winner	8.	1 October 2006	ITF Juárez, Mexico	Clay	(Uruguay) Estefanía Craciún	6–1, 0–6, 6–2
Winner	9.	6 April 2008	ITF Civitavecchia, Italy	Clay	(Slovenia) Polona Hercog	6–2, 6–2
Winner	10.	5 October 2008	ITF Juárez, Mexico	Clay	(Argentina) Jorgelina Cravero	2–2 ret.

=== Doubles: 27 (15 titles, 12 runner-ups) ===
Outcome	Date	Tournament	Surface	Partner	Opponents	Score
Runner–up	20 July 2003	ITF Puerto Ordaz, Venezuela	Hard	(Argentina) Virginia Donda	(Argentina) Soledad Esperón (Argentina) Flavia Mignola	4–6, 4–6
Runner–up	3 May 2004	ITF Mérida, Mexico	Hard	(Argentina) Andrea Benítez	(Mexico) Erika Clarke (Republic of Ireland) Anne Mall	5–7, 5–7
Winner	5 September 2004	ITF Asunción, Paraguay	Clay	(Argentina) Verónica Spiegel	(Brazil) Bruna Colósio (Uruguay) Ana Lucía Migliarini de León	7–5, 6–4
Runner–up	15 November 2005	ITF Puebla, Mexico	Hard	(Argentina) Verónica Spiegel	(Croatia) Ivana Abramović (Croatia) Maria Abramović	6–4, 4–6, 6–7
Winner	12 February 2006	ITF Mérida, Mexico	Hard	(Argentina) Agustina Lepore	(Mexico) Erika Clarke (Mexico) Daniela Múñoz Gallegos	6–1, 6–2
Winner	28 May 2006	ITF Monterrey, Mexico	Hard	(Argentina) Agustina Lepore	(Canada) Valérie Tétreault (Mexico) Lorena Villalobos Cruz	4–6, 6–1, 6–2
Winner	11 June 2006	Jalapa, Mexico	Hard	(Mexico) Daniela Múñoz Gallegos	(Argentina) María Irigoyen (Argentina) Flavia Mignola	7–6^{(8)}, 3–6, 6–1
Winner	16 July 2006	Caracas, Venezuela	Hard	(Chile) Andrea Koch Benvenuto	(Argentina) María Irigoyen (Argentina) Flavia Mignola	4–6, 6–2, 6–2
Winner	17 September 2006	Tampico, Mexico	Hard	(Mexico) Daniela Múñoz Gallegos	(Mexico) Erika Clarke (United States) Courtney Nagle	w/o
Winner	24 September 2006	Guadalajara, Mexico	Clay	(Mexico) Daniela Múñoz Gallegos	(Romania) Alexandra Dulgheru (Mexico) Valeria Pulido	7–5, 6–4
Winner	1 October 2006	Ciudad Juárez, Mexico	Clay	(Uruguay) Estefanía Craciún	(Mexico) Erika Clarke (United States) Courtney Nagle	6–1, 6–1
Runner–up	15 May 2007	Palm Beach Gardens, United States	Clay	(Uruguay) Estefanía Craciún	(Australia) Monique Adamczak (United States) Aleke Tsoubanos	5–7, 6–2, 3–6
Winner	10 June 2007	Madrid, Spain	Clay	(Argentina) Jorgelina Cravero	(Russia) Nina Bratchikova (Portugal) Neuza Silva	6–4, 6–4
Winner	5 August 2007	Washington, United States	Hard	(Argentina) Jorgelina Cravero	(United States) Julie Ditty (South Africa) Natalie Grandin	1–6, 6–1, 6–2
Runner–up	8 October 2007	San Francisco, United States	Hard	(Argentina) Jorgelina Cravero	(United States) Angela Haynes (United States) Raquel Kops-Jones	6–3, 4–6, [7–10]
Runner–up	15 October 2007	San Luis Potosí, Mexico	Hard	(Uruguay) Estefanía Craciún	(Belgium) Debbrich Feys (South Africa) Chanelle Scheepers	1–6, 4–6
Runner–up	14 January 2008	Surprise, United States	Hard	(Brazil) Maria Fernanda Alves	(United States) Carly Gullickson (United States) Shenay Perry	4–6, 5–7
Winner	27 January 2008	Waikoloa Village, United States	Hard	(Brazil) Maria Fernanda Alves	(United States) Angela Haynes (United States) Mashona Washington	7–5, 6–4
Winner	5 April 2008	Civitavecchia, Italy	Clay	(Argentina) Jorgelina Cravero	(Italy) Stefania Chieppa (Belarus) Darya Kustova	4–6, 6–3, [10–6]
Runner–up	7 April 2008	Biarritz, France	Clay	(Argentina) Jorgelina Cravero	(Germany) Martina Müller (Australia) Christina Wheeler	6–7, 6–3, [8–10]
Runner–up	15 September 2008	Albuquerque, United States	Clay	(Argentina) Jorgelina Cravero	(United States) Julie Ditty (United States) Carly Gullickson	3–6, 4–6
Winner	29 September 2008	Ciudad Juárez, Mexico	Clay	(Argentina) Jorgelina Cravero	(Argentina) Soledad Esperón (Argentina) Florencia Molinero	6–0, 7–6^{(8)}
Winner	29 September 2008	Cali, Colombia	Clay	(Spain) Arantxa Parra Santonja	(Portugal) Frederica Piedade (Belarus) Anastasiya Yakimova	6–3, 6–1
Runner–up	14 September 2009	Naples, Italy	Clay	(Argentina) María Irigoyen	(Russia) Nina Bratchikova (Georgia (country)) Oksana Kalashnikova	6–7, 6–2, [8–10]
Runner–up	28 September 2009	ITF Granada, Spain	Hard	(Russia) Valeria Savinykh	(Russia) Nina Bratchikova (Russia) Arina Rodionova	1–6, 6–3, [5–10]
Winner	6 June 2011	ITF Rosario, Argentina	Clay	(Argentina) Jorgelina Cravero	(Argentina) Florencia Di Biasi (Argentina) Vanesa Furlanetto	6–2, 7–6^{(7)}
Runner–up	13 June 2011	ITF Santa Fe, Argentina	Clay	(Argentina) Agustina Lepore	(Argentina) Florencia Di Biasi (Argentina) Vanesa Furlanetto	6–3, 4–6, 4–10
