= Colombia at the 2007 Pan American Games =

- IOC code: COL
- NOC: Colombian Olympic Committee
- Website: www.olimpicocol.co (in Spanish)

in Rio de Janeiro 13–29 July 2007
- Competitors: 307
- Flag bearer: Leydi Solís
- Medals Ranked 6th: Gold 14 Silver 20 Bronze 13 Total 47

Pan American Games appearances (overview)
- 1951; 1955; 1959; 1963; 1967; 1971; 1975; 1979; 1983; 1987; 1991; 1995; 1999; 2003; 2007; 2011; 2015; 2019; 2023; 2027

The 15th Pan American Games were held in Rio de Janeiro, Brazil from 13 July 2007 to 29 July 2007.

== Medals ==
=== Gold ===
===== Archery =====
- Women's Team Competition: Ana Rendón, Sigrid Romero and Natalia Sánchez

===== Boxing =====
- Men's Middleweight (– 81 kg): Eleider Alvarez

===== Cycling =====
- Men's Individual Time Trial: Santiago Botero
- Men's Keirin: Leonardo Narváez
- Women's Sprint: Diana Orrego
- Women's Individual Pursuit: María Luisa Calle

===== Roller Skating =====
- Men's Distance: Jorge Cifuentes

===== Squash =====
- Men's Team Competition: Miguel Rodríguez, Bernardo Samper, and Javier Castilla

===== Weightlifting =====
- Men's 62 kg division: Diego Fernando Salazar
- Men's 85 kg division: José Oliver Ruíz
- Women's 63 kg division: Leydi Solís
- Women's 69 kg division: Tulia Angela Medina
- Women's 75 kg division: Ubaldina Valoyes

===== Wrestling =====
- Women's Freestyle (55 kg division): Jackeline Rentería

=== Silver ===
===== Athletics =====
- Women's 800 metres: Rosibel García

===== Boxing =====
- Men's Super Heavyweight (+ 91 kg): Óscar Rivas

===== Cycling =====
- Men's Team Pursuit: Carlos Alzate, Juan Pablo Forero, Arles Castro and Jairo Pérez
- Men's Madison: Alexander González and José Serpa
- Men's Points Race: José Pérez
- Women's Points Race: María Luisa Calle

===== Karate =====
- Men's 80 kg division: Gilbert Ocoro
- Women's 60 kg division: Ana Escandón

===== Water Ski =====
- Men's Slalom: José Mesa

===== Gymnastics =====
- Men's Individual Competition: Jorge Hugo Giraldo
- Men's Horizontal Bars: Jorge Hugo Giraldo
- Men's Parallel Bars: Jorge Hugo Giraldo

===== Judo =====
- Men's 81 kg division: Mario Valles

===== Roller Skating =====
- Women's Distance: Alexandra Vivas

===== Tennis =====
- Women's Singles: Mariana Duque
- Women's Doubles: Mariana Duque and Karen Castiblanco

===== Weightlifting =====
- Men's 69 kg division: Edwin Mosquera
- Women's 53 kg division: Ana Margot Lemos
- Women's 58 kg division: Rusmeris Villar

===== Wrestling =====
- Men's Freestyle (66 kg division): Edison Hurtado

=== Bronze ===
===== Archery =====
- Women's Individual Competition: Ana Rendón

===== Athletics =====
- Men's 20 km Walk: Gustavo Restrepo
- Women's 1500 metres: Rosibel García

===== Cycling =====
- Men's Team Sprint: Leonardo Narváez, Hernán Sánchez, and Marzuki Mejia

===== Diving =====
- Men's 10m Platform Synchronized: Juan Urán and Víctor Ortega

===== Fencing =====
- Men's Foil: Carlos Rodríguez

===== Judo =====
- Women's 70 kg division: Yuri Alvear

===== Squash =====
- Men's Individual Competition: Miguel Rodríguez
- Women's Team Competition: Silvia Angulo, María Isabel Restrepo and Catalina Peláez

===== Weightlifting =====
- Men's 94 kg division: Wilmer Torres

===== Wrestling =====
- Men's Freestyle (55 kg division): Fredy Serrano
- Men's Freestyle (74 kg division): Wilson Medina
- Men's Freestyle (84 kg division): Rodrigo Piedrahita

== Results by event ==
=== Archery ===
- Natalia Sánchez
- Ana Rendón
- Sigrid Romero
- Diego Alejandro Torres

=== Athletics ===
==== Men's Competition ====
Men's 200 metres

- Daniel Grueso
  - Heat 4 — 20.92
  - Semifinal 1 — 20.96 → did not advance

Men's 5,000 metres

- William Naranjo
  - Final — 13:56.45 → 7th place
- Javier Guarín
  - Final — 14:27.89 → 8th place

Men's 10,000 metres

- William Naranjo
  - Final — 29:13.93 → 7th place
- Javier Guarín
  - Final — 30:02.59 → 9th place

Men's 20 km Walk

- Gustavo Restrepo
  - Final — 01:24.51 → Bronze Medal
- Luis Fernando López
  - Final — DSQ → no ranking

Men's 50 km Walk

- Fredy Hernández
  - Final — 04:03.10 → 6th place

Men's Marathon

- Diego Colorado
  - Final — 02:20.01 → 7th place

Men's High Jump

- Gilmar Mayo
  - Final — 2.10m → 13th place

Men's Shot Put

- Carlos García Córdoba
  - Final — 17.61m → 9th place

Men's Discus Throw

- Julián Angulo
  - Final — 50.79m → 8th place

Men's Javelin Throw

- Noraldo Palacios
  - Final — 71.14m → 5th place

==== Women's Competition ====
Women's 200 metres

- Felipa Palacios
  - Heat 1 — 23.11
  - Semifinal 1 — 23.03
  - Final — 23.34 → 6th place
- Darlenys Obregón
  - Heat 2 — 23.96
  - Semifinal 1 — 23.76 → did not advance

Women's 400 metres

- María Idrobo
  - Semifinal 2 — 54.29 → did not advance

Women's 800 metres

- Rosibel García
  - Semifinal 2 — 2:01.60
  - Final — 2:00.02 → Silver Medal

Women's 1,500 metres

- Rosibel García
  - Final — 4:15.78 → Bronze Medal

Women's 5,000 metres

- Bertha Sánchez
  - Final — 15:49.97 → 6th place

Women's 4 × 100 m Relay

- Briggite Merlano, Felipa Palacios, Mirtha Brock, and Darlenys Obregón
  - Semifinal 2 — 44.53
  - Final — did not start → no ranking

Women's 100 m Hurdles

- Briggite Merlano
  - Semifinal 1 — 13.35 → did not advance

Women's 3,000 m Steeplechase

- Angela María Figueroa
  - Final — 10:14.92 → 6th place

Women's 20 km Walk

- Sandra Zapata
  - Final — 01:43.44 → 6th place

Women's Marathon

- Ruby Riativa
  - Final — 02:51.35 → 6th place

Women's High Jump

- Caterine Ibargüen
  - Final — 1.87m → 4th place

Women's Javelin Throw

- Zuleima Araméndiz
  - Final — 47.95m → 9th place

Women's Hammer Throw

- Eli Johana Moreno
  - Final — 62.77m → 8th place

=== Basketball ===
==== Women's team competition ====
- Preliminary round (Group B)
  - Lost to United States (41-95)
  - Lost to Cuba (53-81)
  - Defeated Argentina (68-66)
- Classification Matches
  - 5th/8th place: Defeated Mexico (62-55)
  - 5th/6th place: Defeated Argentina (59-58) → 5th place
- Team Roster
  - Yaneth Arias
  - Luisa Atehortua
  - Elena Díaz
  - Laura Estrada
  - Mabel Martínez
  - Nancy Mesa
  - Glency Mosquera
  - Tathiana Mosquera
  - Monica Palacios
  - Yenny Pinilla
  - Heissy Robledo
  - Levis Torres

=== Bowling ===
- Rocio Del Pilar
- Paola Rocio Gomez
- Jaime Andrés Gómez
- Jorge David Romero

=== Boxing ===
- Eleider Álvarez
- Darley Pérez
- Óscar Rivas
- William Urina
- Ramiro Nose Rojas
- Oscar Negrete
- Deibis Blanco
- Miguel Angel Escandón

=== Canoeing ===
- Aura Maria Escamilla
- José Miller Cabanzo
- Carlos Andres Escamilla

=== Cycling ===
==== BMX ====
- Andrea Zuluaga
- Augusto Castro
- Andres Eduardo Jimenez

==== MTB ====
- Viviana Maya Tabares
- John Jairo Botero
- Mario Rojas

==== Track ====
- María Luisa Calle
- Diana Maria García
- Carlos Alzate
- Arles Castro
- Juan Pablo Forero
- Alexander González
- Jairo Pérez
- Hernán Sánchez
- José Serpa
- Leonardo Narváez
- Marsuki Mejia

==== Road ====
- Elizabeth Agudelo
- Ana Paola Madriñan
- Sandra Patricia Gómez
- Santiago Botero
- Libardo Niño

=== Diving ===
- Diana Pineda
- Juan Urán
- Víctor Ortega

=== Equestrian ===
- Marco Antonio Bernal
- Carlos Hernando Ramírez
- Ricardo Alberto Villa
- Edgar Mauricio Ruiz

=== Fencing ===
- Laskmy Lozano
- Nancy Vanegas
- Dimitri Clairet
- Javier Orlando Suarez
- Carlos Andres Valencia

=== Football ===
==== Men's team competition ====
- Mauricio Acosta
- Ricardo Chará
- Julian Rojas
- Miguel Angel Julio
- Charles Monsalvo
- Andrés Mosquera Guardia
- Andrés Mosquera Marmolejo
- Cristian Nazarith
- Edgar Pardo
- Charles Arley Quinto
- José Gabriel Ramirez
- Carlos Julio Ramos
- James David Rodríguez
- Junior Javier Romero
- Ricardo Serna Medina
- Santiago Tréllez
- Sebastian Carabalí
- Edward Estivinson

=== Gymnastics ===
- Jessica Gil
- Natalia Sánchez
- Bibiana Velez
- Jorge Hugo Giraldo
- James José Brochero
- Deyvi Castellanos
- Didier Lugo
- Fabian Arley Meza
- William Castellanos

=== Judo ===
- Yuri Alvear
- Lisseth Orozco
- Yadinis Amaris
- Any Cortez
- Yulieth Sánchez
- Mario Valles

=== Karate ===
- Ana Maria Escandón
- Gilber Ocoro

=== Roller Skating ===
- Laura Catalina Zapata
- Diego Duque
- Jennifer Caicedo
- Alexandra Vivas
- Jorge Cifuentes
- Oswaldo Aramis

=== Sailing ===
- Paula Douat
- Juan Camilo Bustos
- Nicolás Deep
- Sebastián Higuera
- Camilo Marmol
- Andrey Quintero
- Monica Villegas

=== Shooting ===
- Amanda Cuellar
- Adriana Rendón
- Paola Murillo
- Natalia Tobar
- Diego Duarte
- Danilo Caro
- Jorge Enrique Peralta
- Luis Alfredo Reina
- Héctor Libardo Devia
- Hernando Ignacio Vega
- Carlos Fernando Solís

=== Softball ===
==== Women's team competition ====
- Yadira Conrado
- Beatriz Cudriz
- Eugenia Fernandez
- Monica García
- Melisa García
- Vianys García
- Durley Giraldo
- Kerling Guzmán
- Livis Hurtado
- Ketty Milian
- Ana Pusey
- Zunilda Mendoza
- Ana Olivo
- Janey Peñata
- Yomara Olivero
- Luz Pérez
- Ibeth Pérez

=== Squash ===
- Silvia Angulo
- Catalina Peláez
- María Restrepo
- Miguel Ángel Rodríguez
- Bernardo Samper
- Javier Castilla

=== Swimming ===
- Carolina Colorado Henao
- Camilo Becerra
- Julio Galofre
- Carlos Viveros
- Omar Pinzón

=== Synchronized Swimming ===
- Asly Alegria
- Margarita Betancourt
- Jennifer Cerquera
- Ingrid Cubillos
- Maria Reyna
- Zully Pérez
- Ibeth Echeverry
- Paula Arcila
- Maritza Valencia

=== Table Tennis ===
- Johana Araque
- Paula Medina
- Luisa Zuluaga

=== Taekwondo ===
- Gladys Mora
- Duwal Asprilla
- Alcira Ortíz

=== Tennis ===
- Karen Emilia Castiblanco
- Mariana Duque
- Viky Núñez
- Pablo José González
- Michael Quintero
- Carlos Salamanca

=== Triathlon ===
==== Men's Competition ====
- Jorge Arías
  - 1:53:53.76 — 10th place
- Ricardo Cardeño
  - did not finish — no ranking

==== Women's Competition ====
- Fiorella D'Croz Brusatin
  - 2:05:53.79 — 18th place
- Maria Morales
  - did not finish — no ranking

=== Volleyball ===
==== Beach ====
- Andrea Galindo
- Claudia Galindo
- Rafael Cabrales
- Diego Naranjo

=== Water Polo ===
==== Men's team competition ====
- Jhon Andrade
- Nelson Bejarano
- Elkin Buitrago
- Sergio Correa
- Juan Echeverry
- Juan Giraldo
- Germán Guarnizo
- Iván Idárraga
- Jairo Lizarazo
- Alex Monroy
- Jorge Montoya
- Guillermo Reina
- Jorge Soto Roldán

=== Water Ski ===
- Maria Camila Linares
- Natalia Hernández
- José Fernando Mesa
- Esteban Siegert

=== Weightlifting ===
- Mercedes Pérez
- Leydi Solís
- Tulia Angela Medina
- Ubaldina Valoyes
- Rusmeris Villar
- Ana Margot Lemos
- Monica Picon
- Diego Fernando Salazar
- Sergio Rada
- José Oliver Ruíz
- Carlos Andica
- Edison Angulo
- Óscar Figueroa
- Edwin Mosquera

=== Wrestling ===
==== Greco-Roman ====
- Cristhian Mosquera
- Iván de Jesus

==== Freestyle ====
- Jackeline Rentería
- Gelmis Alzate
- Fredy Serrano
- Nelson García
- Wilson Medina
- Rodrigo Piedrahita
- Arnulfo Hernández
- Edison Hurtado

== See also ==
- Colombia at the 2008 Summer Olympics
