= Flávio Saretta =

Brazilian tennis player (born 1980)

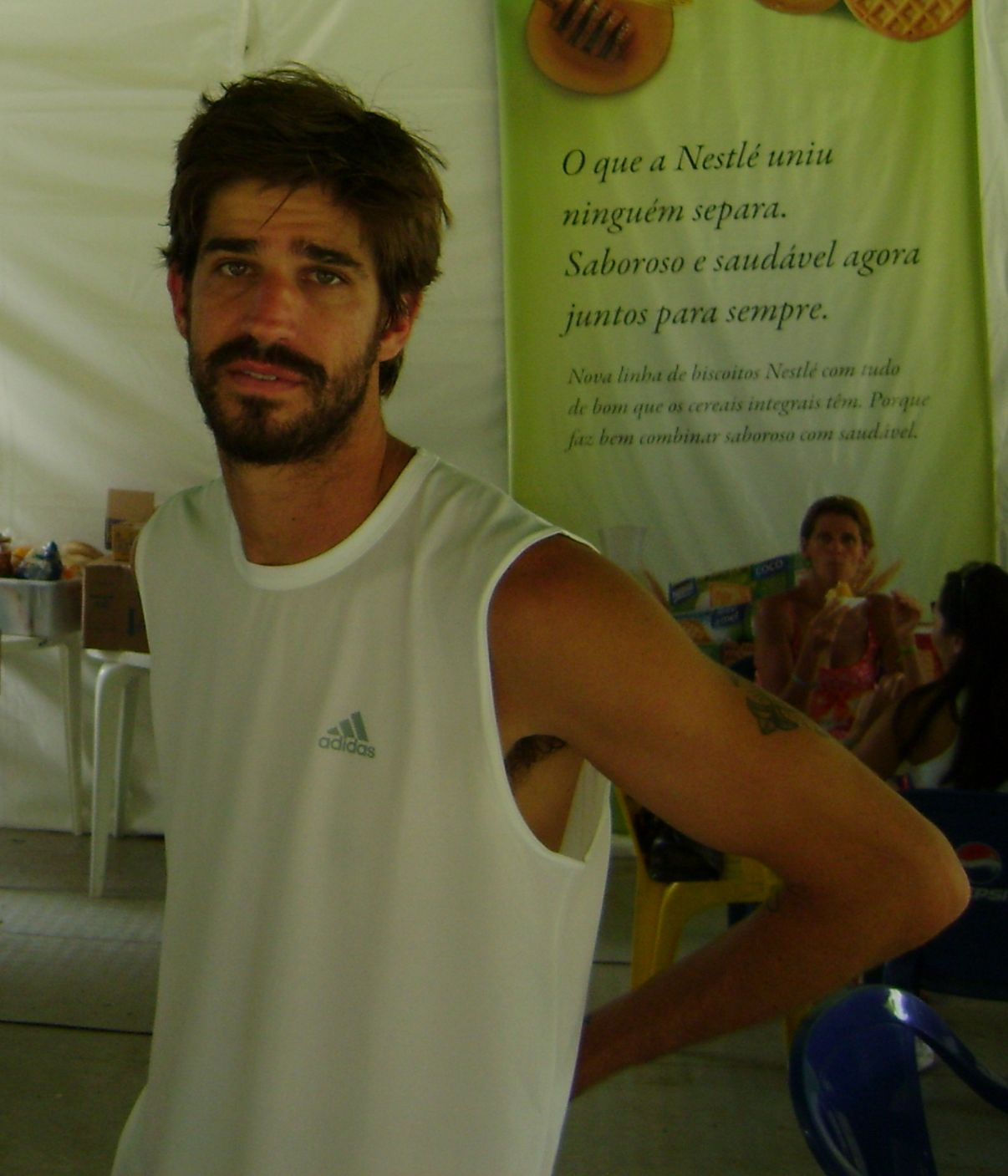
- Country (sports): Brazil
- Residence: Americana, Brazil
- Born: June 28, 1980 (age 46) Americana, Brazil
- Height: 1.82 m (6 ft 0 in)
- Turned pro: 1998
- Retired: 2014
- Plays: Right-handed (two-handed backhand)
- Prize money: $1,239,319

Singles
- Career record: 77–80 (at ATP Tour-level, Grand Slam-level, and in Davis Cup)
- Career titles: 0
- Highest ranking: No. 44 (September 15, 2003)

Grand Slam singles results
- Australian Open: 1R (2002, 2003, 2004, 2005)
- French Open: 4R (2003)
- Wimbledon: 3R (2002, 2003)
- US Open: 3R (2003)

Doubles
- Career record: 19–24 (at ATP Tour-level, Grand Slam-level, and in Davis Cup)
- Career titles: 1
- Highest ranking: No. 78 (July 26, 2004)

Grand Slam doubles results
- Australian Open: QF (2004)
- French Open: 1R (2003, 2004)
- Wimbledon: 2R (2004)

Flávio Saretta
Medal record

Representing Brazil

Men's Tennis

Pan American Games
Gold medal – first place	Rio de Janeiro 2007	Singles

Flávio Saretta Filho (born June 28, 1980) is a former professional tennis player from Brazil who turned professional in 1998.

== Tennis career ==
Saretta has won one ATP Tour doubles title, the 2004 Croatia Open Umag with José Acasuso, defeating Czech players Jaroslav Levinský and David Škoch in the final.

In 2004 he competed in the Tennis Olympic Tournament in both the singles and doubles tournaments. He was eliminated by Andy Roddick in the singles tournament round of 64 and, playing together with André Sá, he reached the doubles tournament round of 16, where he was eliminated by Wayne Black and Kevin Ullyett, from Zimbabwe.

He reached his highest singles ATP-ranking on September 15, 2003, when he became the number 44 of the world, capping what would be the best season of his professional career. He had his best results in all 4 of the Grand Slam tournaments, reaching the Round of 16 at Roland Garros. His clay court prowess was also evident when he was successful in defending his crown at the Bermuda Challenger tournament in April.

During the Hamburg Masters in 2006, Saretta scored one of his biggest wins against the Russian former World No. 1 Marat Safin, 5–7, 6–0, 6–4.

Flávio Saretta won the Rio Pan-American Games 2007, after saving 2 match-points at semi and at final against, respectively, Eduardo Schwank and Adrián García. In the end of 2007 Saretta had one of the biggest injuries of his entire career and he is out of the circuit since then.

In 2009, Saretta announced that he will stop playing professionally because he is tired of "fighting against the pain" of his injuries. He had an unsuccessful comeback in 2014, losing all his matches that year in three tournaments played in Brazilian soil.

In 2015 Saretta became a tennis commentator for BandSports, a Brazilian sports cable channel.

== Titles (12) ==
=== Singles (7) ===
Legend Grand Slam (0) Tennis Masters Cup (0) ATP Masters Series (0) ATP Tour (0) Challengers (7)	Titles by surface Hard (4) Grass (0) Clay (3) Carpet (0)

No.	Date	Tournament	Surface	Opponent in the final	Score
1.	January 1, 2001	São Paulo, Brazil	Hard	(Argentina) Guillermo Coria	7–6^{(7)}, 6–2
2.	September 4, 2001	Curitiba, Brazil	Clay	(Peru) Luis Horna	7–6^{(3)}, 6–1
3.	April 15, 2002	Bermuda, Bermuda	Clay	(United States) Vince Spadea	6–3, 7–5
4.	December 30, 2002	São Paulo, Brazil	Hard	(Argentina) Andres Dellatorre	7–6^{(5)}, 6–3
5.	April 14, 2003	Bermuda, Bermuda	Clay	(Chile) Nicolás Massú	6–1, 6–4
6.	August 8, 2005	Gramado, Brazil	Hard	(Sweden) Jacob Adaktusson	6–1, 6–3
7.	January 2, 2006	São Paulo, Brazil	Hard	(Brazil) Thiago Alves	7–6^{(2)}, 6–3

=== Doubles (5) ===
Legend Grand Slam (0) Tennis Masters Cup (0) ATP Masters Series (0) ATP Tour (1) Challengers (4)	Titles by surface Hard (1) Grass (0) Clay (4) Carpet (0)

No.	Date	Tournament	Surface	Partnering	Opponents in the final	Score
1.	September 2, 2001	Campinas, Brazil	Clay	(Argentina) Edgardo Massa	(Brazil) Adriano Ferreira (Brazil) Antonio Prieto	1–6, 7–6^{(5)}, 6–4
2.	July 19, 2004	Umag, Croatia	Clay	(Argentina) José Acasuso	(Czech Republic) Jaroslav Levinský (Czech Republic) David Škoch	4–6, 6–2, 6–4
3.	January 8, 2006	São Paulo, Brazil	Hard	(Brazil) Thiago Alves	(Brazil) Lucas Engel (Brazil) André Ghem	7–6^{(10)}, 6–3
4.	November 12, 2006	Buenos Aires, Argentina	Clay	(Brazil) André Ghem	(Germany) Tomas Behrend (Spain) Marcel Granollers	6–1, 6–4
5.	October 19, 2008	Montevideo, Uruguay	Clay	(Brazil) Franco Ferreiro	(Spain) Daniel Gimeno Traver (Spain) Rubén Ramírez Hidalgo	6–3, 6–2

== Runners-up (14) ==
=== Singles (6) ===
Legend Grand Slam (0) Tennis Masters Cup (0) ATP Masters Series (0) ATP Tour (0) Challengers (6)	Finals by surface Hard (1) Grass (0) Clay (5) Carpet (0)

No.	Date	Tournament	Surface	Opponent in the final	Score
1.	July 30, 2001	Belo Horizonte, Brazil	Hard	(United States) Eric Taino	5–7, 6–1, 6–2
2.	April 4, 2005	Mexico City, Mexico	Clay	(France) Florent Serra	6–1, 6–4
3.	June 6, 2005	Lugano, Switzerland	Clay	(Spain) Albert Montañés	7–5, 6–7^{(4)}, 7–6^{(5)}
4.	November 7, 2005	Guayaquil, Ecuador	Clay	(Brazil) Marcos Daniel	6–2, 1–6, 6–0
5.	November 13, 2006	Asunción, Paraguay	Clay	(Argentina) Guillermo Cañas	6–4, 6–1
6.	March 12, 2007	Bogotá, Colombia	Clay	(Colombia) Santiago Giraldo	7–6^{(4)}, 6–2

=== Doubles (8) ===
Legend Grand Slam (0) Tennis Masters Cup (0) ATP Masters Series (0) ATP Tour (0) Challengers (8)	Finals by surface Hard (2) Grass (0) Clay (6) Carpet (0)

No.	Date	Tournament	Surface	Partnering	Opponents in the final	Score
1.	October 9, 2000	Guadalajara, Mexico	Clay	(Brazil) Fernando Meligeni	(United States) Hugo Armando (Germany) Alexander Waske	7–6^{(4)}, 4–6, 7–6^{(7)}
2.	January 1, 2001	São Paulo, Brazil	Hard	(France) Cedric Kauffmann	(Israel) Noam Okun (Brazil) André Sá	6–4, 1–6, 6–4
3.	March 12, 2001	Salinas, Ecuador	Hard	(Brazil) Daniel Melo	(Peru) Luis Horna (Argentina) David Nalbandian	6–4, 0–6, 6–1
4.	July 9, 2001	Campinas, Brazil	Clay	(Venezuela) José de Armas	(Argentina) Edgardo Massa (Argentina) Leonardo Olguín	6–7^{(6)}, 6–2, 7–5
5.	April 4, 2005	Mexico City, Mexico	Clay	(Brazil) Marcos Daniel	(Czech Republic) Lukáš Dlouhý (Czech Republic) Pavel Šnobel	5–7, 6–4, 6–3
6.	July 3, 2007	Turin, Italy	Clay	(Spain) Pablo Andújar	(Uruguay) Pablo Cuevas (Argentina) Horacio Zeballos	6–3, 6–1
7.	September 8, 2008	Seville, Spain	Clay	(Brazil) Rogério Dutra da Silva	(Spain) David Marrero (Spain) Pablo Santos	2–6, 6–2, [10–8]
8.	March 9, 2009	Santiago, Chile	Clay	(Brazil) Rogério Dutra da Silva	(Argentina) Sebastián Prieto (Argentina) Horacio Zeballos	7–6^{(2)}, 6–2
