= Triathlon at the 2003 Pan American Games =

This page shows the results of the triathlon competition at the 2003 Pan American Games, held on August 10, 2003 in Santo Domingo, Dominican Republic. For the third time the sport was a part of the multi-sports event of the America's.

== Qualifying ==
- 3 spots to be awarded at the ITU Regional Championship in Rio de Janeiro, September 15, 2002
- 3 spots to be awarded at the Central American and Caribbean Games, El Salvador, November 28, 2002
- 3 spots to be awarded at the ITU points race in La Paz, Argentina, 2003
- 20 spots to be awarded through the Patco rankings (which is extracted from the ITU rankings, with events in the Americas only). If countries have filled the maximum 3 spots by previous event criteria, the spots roll down in the rankings
- 5 spots to be awarded as wild cards
- 1 spot for the host country Dominican Republic

== Men's competition ==
Rank	Name	Swim	Bike	Run	Time
Gold medal	Hunter Kemper (USA)	19:57.90	57:45.30	33:22.40	1:52:00
Silver medal	Vigilio de Castilho (BRA)	19:56.30	57:48.10	34:12.30	1:52:50
Bronze medal	Oscar Galíndez (ARG)	20:57.60	56:45.90	34:16.20	1:52:59
4	Doug Friman (USA)	19:49.60	57:54.70	34:49.90	1:53:11
5	Daniel Fontana (ARG)	19:59.10	57:46.70	35:18.50	1:53:28
6	Paulo Miyashiro (BRA)	19:32.90	58:11.30	35:39.30	1:54:01
7	José Zepeda (MEX)	20:03.80	57:28.70	36:14.20	1:54:17
8	Brent McMahon (CAN)	19:58.80	57:46.00	36:14.20	1:54:46
9	Leandro Macedo (BRA)	20:51.80	58:43.40	34:20.80	1:54:55
10	Eligio Cervantes (MEX)	20:58.00	58:34.50	34:30.70	1:55:00
11	Javier Rosas (MEX)	20:05.90	59:33.30	35:35.10	1:56:04
12	Gilberto González (VEN)	20:05.50	59:27.50	35:47.20	1:56:16
13	Felipe van de Wyngard (CHI)	19:56.80	57:49.40	38:23.80	1:57:11
14	Yean Jiménez (DOM)	20:57.20	58:38.50	36:54.80	1:57:24
15	Victor Plata (USA)	20:06.60	59:28.80	36:45.10	1:57:24
16	Leonardo Chacón (CRC)	20:49.80	58:44.40	37:31.90	1:58:06
17	Yaccery Leal (CUB)	20:59.10	58:39.00	37:59.60	1:58:33
18	Paul Tichelaar (CAN)	20:02.10	57:13.80	40:40.40	1:58:52
19	Matias Optiz (CHI)	22:07.00	1:00:50.50	36:19.70	2:00:15
20	Sean Bechtel (CAN)	20:01.90	57:13.30	42:05.50	2:00:17
21	Ezequiel Morales (ARG)	22:05.30	1:00:55.60	37:21.50	2:01:17
22	Carlos Friely (GUA)	23:12.50	1:00:29.40	37:01.00	2:01:48
23	Agustin Fontes (VEN)	20:57.10	58:36.90	41:16.40	2:02:00
24	Carlos Loor (ECU)	20:04.20	59:31.60	41:46.90	2:02:26
25	Gabriel Rojas (VEN)	20:50.10	58:40.90	44:40.70	2:05:20
26	Anthony van Lierop (SUR)	21:02.00	1:01:57.10	41:38.90	2:05:35
27	Robert Nuñéz (DOM)	22:01.90	1:00:56.20	43:11.20	2:07:12
28	Guillermo Nantes (URU)	21:37.10	1:01:27.30	44:07.90	2:08:04
29	Fabio Campo (CRC)	23:11.30	1:00:25.90	43:15.50	2:08:12
30	Roberto Machado (CRC)	23:11.70	1:00:33.40	43:54.50	2:08:41
31	Daniel de Montreuil (PER)	22:01.90	1:01:39.50	49:22.50	2:14:14
—	Cristian Bustos (CHI)	23:18.800	1:00:20.20	—	DNF
—	Juan Enderica (ECU)	21:00.80	—	—	DNF
—	Angel Mogrovejo (ECU)	21:32.70	—	—	DNF
—	Jonathan Monsanto (DOM)	24:55.70	—	—	DNF
—	Carlos Doce (PAR)	25:00.50	—	—	DNF
—	Ricardo Cardeño (COL)	—	—	—	DNS

== Women's competition ==
Rank	Name	Swim	Bike	Run	Time
Gold medal	Jill Savege (CAN)	18:33.60	1:02:16.80	37:38.70	1:59:30
Silver medal	Sheila Taormina (USA)	18:30.50	1:02:15.30	39:26.20	2:00:12
Bronze medal	Becky Gibbs (USA)	18:36.20	1:02:12.30	39:48.20	2:00:36
4	Carla Moreno (BRA)	18:49.80	1:05:06.60	37:55.10	2:01:51
5	Sandra Soldan (BRA)	18:49.70	1:05:10.80	38:14.00	2:02:14
6	Mariana Ohata (BRA)	19:52.50	1:04:04.50	39:18.00	2:03:15
7	Gillian Moody (CAN)	19:53.90	1:04:08.80	39:32.70	2:03:35
8	Julie Swail (USA)	18:52.30	1:05:05.30	40:22.10	2:04:19
9	Nancy Álvarez (ARG)	19:59.40	1:04:00.70	40:59.60	2:04:59
10	Natasha Filliol (CAN)	21:11.10	1:06:27.60	38:26.60	2:06:05
11	Esther Aguayo (MEX)	19:54.30	1:03:59.40	42:17.10	2:06:10
12	Yaricel Romero (CUB)	22:00.40	1:06:57.90	41:50.30	2:10:48
13	Niurka Guirola (CUB)	22:00.00	1:07:01.50	43:43.90	2:12:45
14	María Soledad Omar (ARG)	22:00.80	1:06:55.80	44:59.80	2:13:56
15	Maria Barrera (MEX)	21:53.70	1:09:34.00	43:34.00	2:15:02
16	Fiorella d'Croz (COL)	21:34.60	1:07:24.00	47:51.80	2:16:50
17	Monica Umaña (CRC)	21:59.40	1:10:47.70	48:37.90	2:21:25
18	Anabel Mateo (DOM)	20:52.90	1:08:05.40	55:14.20	2:24:12
—	Melissa Duran (DOM)	21:49.80	—	—	DNF
—	Viviana Chavarria (CRC)	21:52.90	—	—	DNF
—	Ana Paula Ortega (ARG)	22:00.10	—	—	DNF
—	Agnes Eppers (BOL)	26:58.50	—	—	DNF
—	Maria Morales (COL)	—	—	—	DNS

== Medal table ==
Rank	Nation	Gold	Silver	Bronze	Total
1	United States	1	1	1	3
2	Canada	1	0	0	1
3	Brazil	0	1	0	1
4	Argentina	0	0	1	1
Totals (4 entries)		2	2	2	6

== See also ==
- Triathlon at the 2002 Central American and Caribbean Games
- Triathlon at the 2002 South American Games
