= 2001 ITU Triathlon World Championships =

International sports competition

ITU Triathlon World Championships
- Location: Edmonton, Alberta, Canada
- Date: July 22 2001

Champions
- Men: Peter Robertson (AUS)
- Women: Siri Lindley (USA)

The 2001 ITU Triathlon World Championships was a triathlon competition held in Edmonton, Alberta in Canada on July 22 2001 and organized by the International Triathlon Union, now World Triathlon. This was the 13th edition of the competition inaugurated in 1989. The event crowned the world champions in elite and junior elite triathlon for the 2001 season.

All races for men and women consisted of a 1.5 km (0.93 mi) swim, 40 km (25 mi) bike and 20 km (12 mi) run, referred to as 'Standard' or 'Olympic' distance triathlon, significantly shorter than the classic Ironman Triathlon event.

== Medal Summary ==
Event	Gold		Silver		Bronze	
Elite
Men	Peter Robertson; Australia	1:48:00	Chris Hill; Australia	1:48:11	Craig Watson; New Zealand	1:48:13
Women	Siri Lindley; United States	1:58:50	Michellie Jones; Australia	1:59:41	Joanna Zeiger; United States	1:59:55
Junior elite
Junior men	Sebastian Dehmer; Germany	1:51:22	Emilio D'Aquino; Italy	1:51:30	Luke McKenzie; Australia	1:52:06
Junior women	Nicola Spirig; Switzerland	2:04:11	Beatrice Lanza; Italy	2:04:25	Jodie Swallow; Great Britain	2:04:44

== Results ==
The following are the results of the elite races:

=== Men ===
Rank	Athlete	Nation	Swim	T1	Bike	T2	Run	Overall time
1st place, gold medalist(s)	Peter Robertson	Australia (AUS)	18:25	0:53	56:25	0:24	31:55	1:48:00
2nd place, silver medalist(s)	Chris Hill	Australia (AUS)	18:42	0:51	56:34	0:26	31:35	1:48:11
3rd place, bronze medalist(s)	Craig Watson	New Zealand (NZL)	18:04	0:54	57:13	0:27	31:32	1:48:13
4	Ivan Raña	Spain (ESP)	18:38	0:48	56:44	0:28	31:45	1:48:26
5	Andrew Johns	Great Britain (GBR)	18:18	0:53	57:00	0:26	31:57	1:48:36
6	Simon Whitfield	Canada (CAN)	18:27	0:48	56:57	0:28	31:59	1:48:41
7	Bevan Docherty	New Zealand (NZL)	18:15	0:53	57:05	0:28	32:00	1:48:42
8	Reto Hug	Switzerland (SUI)	18:18	0:53	56:57	0:26	32:10	1:48:46
9	Miles Stewart	Australia (AUS)	18:12	0:51	56:36	0:26	32:49	1:48:52
10	Stephane Poulat	France (FRA)	18:00	0:53	57:15	0:31	32:20	1:48:58
11	Joe Umphenour	United States (USA)	18:17	0:56	57:01	0:28	32:22	1:49:06
12	Filip Ospaly	Czech Republic (CZE)	18:30	0:54	56:53	0:34	32:20	1:49:09
13	Tim Don	Great Britain (GBR)	18:14	0:51	57:12	0:32	32:31	1:49:21
14	Trent Chapman	Australia (AUS)	18:02	0:51	57:22	0:26	32:41	1:49:22
15	Hunter Kemper	United States (USA)	18:09	0:51	57:12	0:26	32:42	1:49:22
16	Marc Jenkins	Great Britain (GBR)	18:07	0:53	57:20	0:32	32:39	1:49:31
17	Sylvain Dodet	France (FRA)	18:38	0:48	56:45	0:28	32:51	1:49:33
18	Martin Krnavek	Czech Republic (CZE)	18:41	0:51	56:42	0:32	32:49	1:49:37
19	Brian Fleischmann	United States (USA)	18:32	0:53	56:51	0:34	32:54	1:49:44
20	Javier Rosas Sierra	Mexico (MEX)	18:31	0:54	56:47	0:28	33:12	1:49:55
21	Frederic Belaubre	France (FRA)	18:00	0:57	57:19	0:37	33:02	1:49:57
22	Andrey Glushenko	Kazakhstan (KAZ)	18:13	0:48	57:10	0:28	33:20	1:50:01
23	Daniel Unger	Germany (GER)	18:29	0:56	56:50	0:26	33:21	1:50:01
24	Maik Petzold	Germany (GER)	18:17	0:48	57:05	0:28	33:21	1:50:02
25	Eneko Llanos Burguera	Spain (ESP)	18:37	0:53	56:42	0:26	33:28	1:50:09
26	Joachim Willen	Sweden (SWE)	18:26	0:53	56:55	0:37	33:21	1:50:12
27	Stephan Bignet	France (FRA)	18:05	0:58	57:10	0:36	33:28	1:50:19
28	Richard Allen	Great Britain (GBR)	18:23	0:53	56:59	0:26	33:44	1:50:25
29	Xavier Llobet Sallent	Spain (ESP)	18:12	0:51	57:15	0:34	33:34	1:50:28
30	Kris Gemmel	New Zealand (NZL)	18:13	0:53	57:04	0:24	33:58	1:50:31
31	Craig Alexander	Australia (AUS)	18:24	0:53	57:00	0:31	33:45	1:50:33
32	Frank Bignet	France (FRA)	17:59	0:53	57:24	0:36	33:45	1:50:36
33	Eligio Cervantes Islas	Mexico (MEX)	18:27	0:48	56:57	0:31	33:53	1:50:39
34	Csaba Kuttor	Hungary (HUN)	18:04	0:56	57:16	0:32	33:55	1:50:43
35	Andy Kelsey	United States (USA)	18:10	0:54	57:12	0:36	34:01	1:50:55
36	Spencer Smith	Great Britain (GBR)	18:24	0:57	56:54	0:28	34:35	1:51:17
37	Richard Stannard	Great Britain (GBR)	18:13	0:57	56:28	0:26	35:23	1:51:27
38	Daniel Fontana	Italy (ITA)	18:41	0:57	58:47	0:28	32:37	1:51:34
39	Nathan Richmond	New Zealand (NZL)	18:13	0:54	57:09	0:31	34:52	1:51:38
40	Junichi Yamamoto	Japan (JPN)	18:40	0:53	56:42	0:37	35:20	1:52:13
41	Gilberto Gonzalez	Venezuela (VEN)	18:53	0:58	58:38	0:31	33:32	1:52:32
42	Volodymyr Polikarpenko	Ukraine (UKR)	18:40	0:54	58:56	0:28	33:34	1:52:34
43	Vasilis Krommidas	Greece (GRE)	18:55	0:53	58:35	0:28	33:45	1:52:40
44	Matthew Reed	United States (USA)	18:00	0:53	57:21	0:28	36:08	1:52:51
45	Jose Maria Merchan Illanes	Spain (ESP)	19:06	0:51	58:30	0:34	33:52	1:52:53
46	Hamish Carter	New Zealand (NZL)	18:04	0:53	57:13	0:26	36:24	1:53:00
47	Michael Smedley	United States (USA)	18:23	0:51	57:05	0:31	36:18	1:53:09
48	Juraci Moreira	Brazil (BRA)	18:50	0:53	58:46	0:31	34:12	1:53:12
49	Brad Storm	South Africa (RSA)	18:27	0:53	56:55	0:31	36:31	1:53:16
50	Hiroyuki Nishiuchi	Japan (JPN)	18:51	0:53	58:43	0:27	34:42	1:53:37
51	Arturo Garza Heiras	Mexico (MEX)	19:08	0:54	58:24	0:28	34:54	1:53:50
52	Dirk Bockel	Luxembourg (LUX)	18:45	0:56	58:45	0:26	35:07	1:54:01
53	Jarmo Hast	Finland (FIN)	19:04	0:57	58:30	0:31	35:06	1:54:07
54	Fedor Filipov	Russia (RUS)	18:48	0:53	58:52	0:34	36:25	1:55:31
55	Hektor Llanos Burguera	Spain (ESP)	18:49	1:03	58:40	0:31	36:37	1:55:38
56	Teppei Takeuchi	Japan (JPN)	18:55	0:56	58:39	0:31	37:03	1:56:05
57	Carl Storm	South Africa (RSA)	18:32	0:54	56:52	0:31	39:32	1:56:21
58	Marcus Ornellas	Brazil (BRA)	19:06	0:56	58:24	0:34	37:37	1:56:38
59	Brent Perdrizet	United States (USA)	20:28	0:58	1:02:27	0:31	34:09	1:58:32
60	Jose Uzziel Valderrabano	Mexico (MEX)	19:11	0:54	1:03:43	0:32	34:24	1:58:49
61	Ryosuke Yamamoto	Japan (JPN)	18:54	0:56	58:48	0:34	39:55	1:59:07
62	Daniel Lee Chi Wo	Hong Kong (HKG)	20:30	0:53	1:02:28	0:28	35:27	1:59:48
63	Carlos Gil Sojo	Spain (ESP)	19:26	0:54	1:03:35	0:32	35:46	2:00:14
64	Esteban Kahs-Garay	Chile (CHI)	19:18	1:00	1:03:32	0:31	36:54	2:01:16
65	Dimitris Kasimis	Greece (GRE)	19:56	1:08	1:02:50	0:37	38:15	2:02:45
66	John Freddy Tibocha	Colombia (COL)	19:26	0:56	1:03:31	0:34	38:52	2:03:19
-	Chris McCormack	Australia (AUS)	18:30	0:51	56:21	0:25	-	-
-	Dmitriy Gaag	Kazakhstan (KAZ)	19:26	0:56	-	-	-	-
-	Paulo Armando Barcellos Saraiva	Brazil (BRA)	20:30	0:54	-	-	-	-
-	Jose Luis Zepeda	Mexico (MEX)	18:44	0:56	58:51	0:33	-	-
-	Eric Van Der Linden	Netherlands (NED)	19:05	0:52	58:45	-	-	-
-	Stefan Jakobsen	Canada (CAN)	20:30	0:55	-	-	-	-
-	Lieuw Boonstra	South Africa (RSA)	19:28	0:51	-	-	-	-
-	Kelly Guest	Canada (CAN)	19:22	0:52	1:03:18	0:29	-	-
Key : DNF - did not finish ; DNS - did not start

=== Women ===
Rank	Athlete	Nation	Swim	T1	Bike	T2	Run	Overall time
1st place, gold medalist(s)	Siri Lindley	United States (USA)	19:33	0:58	1:02:59	0:29	34:54	1:58:50
2nd place, silver medalist(s)	Michellie Jones	Australia (AUS)	19:21	0:58	1:03:09	0:31	35:44	1:59:41
3rd place, bronze medalist(s)	Joanna Zeiger	United States (USA)	18:53	0:59	1:03:39	0:34	35:50	1:59:55
4	Natasha Hilgeholt	New Zealand (NZL)	19:20	0:58	1:03:15	0:31	36:19	2:00:25
5	Kathleen Smet	Belgium (BEL)	19:35	0:58	1:02:52	0:36	36:42	2:00:46
6	Jill Savege	Canada (CAN)	19:19	0:59	1:03:12	0:29	36:53	2:00:50
7	Silvia Gemignani	Italy (ITA)	19:13	1:03	1:03:13	0:37	36:48	2:00:54
8	Loretta Harrop	Australia (AUS)	18:45	0:54	1:03:53	0:27	36:56	2:00:58
9	Evelyn Williamson	New Zealand (NZL)	19:48	0:58	1:02:40	0:32	37:10	2:01:11
10	Christiane Pilz	Germany (GER)	19:34	0:53	1:02:56	0:34	37:19	2:01:17
11	Lenka Kovarova	Czech Republic (CZE)	19:22	0:58	1:03:13	0:34	37:18	2:01:24
12	Carol Montgomery	Canada (CAN)	20:28	0:56	1:04:55	0:34	34:52	2:01:44
13	Joelle Tesche	Germany (GER)	19:48	0:54	1:02:45	0:31	37:50	2:01:48
14	Barbara Lindquist	United States (USA)	18:46	0:56	1:03:52	0:34	37:44	2:01:53
15	Becky Gibbs Lavelle	United States (USA)	19:17	1:03	1:03:12	0:34	38:12	2:02:16
16	Sandra Soldan	Brazil (BRA)	19:33	0:58	1:02:57	0:34	38:29	2:02:32
17	Leanda Cave	Great Britain (GBR)	19:20	0:58	1:03:10	0:37	38:31	2:02:36
18	Sharon Donnelly	Canada (CAN)	19:19	1:01	1:03:09	0:32	38:42	2:02:43
19	Lucie Zelenkova	Czech Republic (CZE)	19:20	0:58	1:03:12	0:34	38:42	2:02:47
20	Wieke Hoogzaad	Netherlands (NED)	19:50	0:58	1:05:28	0:34	36:18	2:03:08
21	Laura Bennett	United States (USA)	18:46	0:56	1:03:51	0:29	39:32	2:03:35
22	Michelle Dillon	Great Britain (GBR)	21:14	0:54	1:04:08	0:34	36:54	2:03:45
23	Andrea Whitcombe	Great Britain (GBR)	20:31	1:04	1:04:55	0:34	37:10	2:04:15
24	Sheila Taormina	United States (USA)	18:44	0:56	1:03:48	0:31	40:39	2:04:39
25	Carla Moreno	Brazil (BRA)	20:05	0:58	1:05:12	0:32	38:01	2:04:50
26	Melissa Ashton	Australia (AUS)	20:07	0:58	1:05:22	0:31	38:01	2:04:56
27	Heather Evans	New Zealand (NZL)	20:38	0:58	1:04:44	0:36	38:09	2:05:06
28	Renata Berkova	Czech Republic (CZE)	19:53	1:01	1:05:43	0:34	38:19	2:05:34
29	Stephanie Deanaz	France (FRA)	20:39	1:01	1:04:35	0:36	39:14	2:06:07
30	Nina Anisimova	Russia (RUS)	20:13	0:58	1:05:26	0:51	38:49	2:06:16
31	Ana Burgos Acuña	Spain (ESP)	21:43	0:59	1:06:11	0:36	36:55	2:06:26
32	Machiko Nakanishi	Japan (JPN)	20:36	1:03	1:04:37	0:34	39:46	2:06:37
33	Heather Williams	Great Britain (GBR)	20:02	1:01	1:05:11	0:37	39:57	2:06:49
34	Jennifer Gutierrez	United States (USA)	19:36	0:59	1:05:42	0:34	40:22	2:07:17
35	Dominique Donner	South Africa (RSA)	19:17	1:08	1:03:08	0:39	43:16	2:07:28
36	Natasha Filliol	Canada (CAN)	21:43	0:59	1:06:08	0:34	38:11	2:07:34
37	Pilar Hidalgo Iglesias	Spain (ESP)	20:27	1:01	1:04:59	0:31	41:10	2:08:07
38	Samantha Mcglone	Canada (CAN)	21:47	1:01	1:06:03	0:32	38:49	2:08:13
39	Tereza Macel	Czech Republic (CZE)	19:48	0:58	1:05:42	0:41	42:01	2:09:10
40	Liz Blatchford	Great Britain (GBR)	20:13	0:56	1:05:04	0:37	42:37	2:09:28
41	Nancy Alvarez	Argentina (ARG)	21:44	1:01	1:06:09	0:34	40:01	2:09:28
42	Fiorella D'Croz	Colombia (COL)	20:10	1:01	1:05:10	0:32	42:56	2:09:49
43	Agnes Eppers	Bolivia (BOL)	25:38	1:01	1:06:35	0:37	37:40	2:11:33
44	Nóra Edöcsény	Hungary (HUN)	21:13	1:06	1:10:19	0:36	40:51	2:14:06
45	Miyuki Biwata	Japan (JPN)	21:44	1:03	1:09:52	0:32	42:15	2:15:24
46	Donna Phelan	Canada (CAN)	21:41	1:03	1:10:31	0:34	41:55	2:15:45
47	Rowena Curr	South Africa (RSA)	21:45	0:58	1:10:36	0:37	45:07	2:19:02
-	Nicole Hackett	Australia (AUS)	18:46	0:56	-	-	-	DNF
-	Stefanie Forester	Great Britain (GBR)	21:14	0:56	1:11:24	-	-	DNF
-	Akiko Sekine	Japan (JPN)	21:13	0:59	-	-	-	DNF
-	Sibylle Matter Bruegger	Switzerland (SUI)	20:39	0:58	1:04:41	-	-	DNF
-	Mieke Suys	Belgium (BEL)	20:14	0:59	1:05:05	0:33	-	DNF
-	Nathalie Daumas	France (FRA)	19:59	1:03	-	-	-	DNF
-	Nadia Cortassa	Italy (ITA)	22:21	1:08	-	-	-	DNF
-	Pamela Geijo	Argentina (ARG)	21:40	1:05	-	-	-	DNF
Key : DNF - did not finish ; DNS - did not start

=== Junior ===
==== Junior men ====
(Top 10 only)

Rank	Athlete	Nation	Swim	T1	Bike	T2	Run	Overall time
1st place, gold medalist(s)	Sebastian Dehmer	Germany (GER)	19:55	0:46	57:36	0:22	32:41	1:51:22
2nd place, silver medalist(s)	Emilio D'Aquino	Italy (ITA)	19:05	0:56	58:15	0:26	32:49	1:51:30
3rd place, bronze medalist(s)	Luke Mckenzie	Australia (AUS)	18:59	0:49	58:25	0:24	33:30	1:52:06
4	Rory Mackie	Zimbabwe (ZIM)	19:56	0:53	57:24	0:26	33:43	1:52:21
5	Paul Tichelaar	Canada (CAN)	19:04	0:51	58:16	0:29	34:08	1:52:47
6	Christian Prochnow	Germany (GER)	19:36	1:01	57:38	0:31	34:03	1:52:51
7	Daniel Hayes	Great Britain (GBR)	18:16	0:53	59:02	0:26	34:25	1:53:04
8	Sylvain Sudrie	France (FRA)	19:02	0:56	58:14	0:31	34:25	1:53:09
9	Sven Riederer	Switzerland (SUI)	19:21	0:54	57:55	0:24	34:37	1:53:11
10	Daniele Fiorentini	Italy (ITA)	18:54	0:53	58:27	0:29	34:28	1:53:11
Key : DNF - did not finish ; DNS - did not start

==== Junior Women ====
(Top 10 only)

Rank	Athlete	Nation	Swim	T1	Bike	T2	Run	Overall time
1st place, gold medalist(s)	Nicola Spirig	Switzerland (SUI)	20:56	1:01	1:04:44	0:34	36:56	2:04:11
2nd place, silver medalist(s)	Beatrice Lanza	Italy (ITA)	20:50	1:01	1:04:48	0:31	37:13	2:04:25
3rd place, bronze medalist(s)	Jodie Swallow	Great Britain (GBR)	19:32	0:58	1:06:19	0:34	37:22	2:04:44
4	Ricarda Lisk	Germany (GER)	20:39	1:01	1:05:02	0:34	37:46	2:05:01
5	Catherine Hare	Great Britain (GBR)	20:32	1:03	1:05:06	0:34	37:53	2:05:08
6	Janine Härtel	Germany (GER)	19:34	1:01	1:06:08	0:31	38:01	2:05:16
7	Annabel Luxford	Australia (AUS)	19:33	0:59	1:06:09	0:34	38:28	2:05:43
8	Saori Ohmatsu	Japan (JPN)	20:43	1:01	1:05:02	0:31	38:50	2:06:08
9	Jessica Mayon	Belgium (BEL)	20:52	1:01	1:04:55	0:32	38:52	2:06:12
10	Kathy Tremblay	Canada (CAN)	20:43	0:58	1:05:01	0:34	38:58	2:06:14
Key : DNF - did not finish ; DNS - did not start
