= Triathlon at the 2007 Pan American Games =

The triathlon competition at the 2007 Pan American Games was held on July 15, 2007, in Rio de Janeiro, Brazil, the fourth time the event had been held at the Pan American Games. The male and female winners qualified directly for the 2008 Summer Olympics in Beijing, China.

== Men's competition ==
RANK	FINAL	TIME	DIFFERENCE
Gold medal	Andy Potts (USA)	1:52:31.51	—
Silver medal	Brent McMahon (CAN)	1:52:38.19	+0:06.68
Bronze medal	Juraci Moreira (BRA)	1:52:54.79	+0:23.28
4	Kyle Jones (CAN)	1:53:05.25	+0:33.74
5	Leonardo Chacón (CRC)	1:53:13.75	+0:42.24
6	Jarrod Shoemaker (USA)	1:53:32.74	+1:01.23
7	Michel González (CUB)	1:53:34.57	+1:03.06
8	Brian Fleischmann (USA)	1:53:37.36	+1:05.85
9	Arturo Garza (MEX)	1:53:43.51	+1:12.00
10	Jorge Arias (COL)	1:53:53.76	+1:22.25
11	Paul Tichelaar (CAN)	1:54:03.16	+1:31.65
12	Javier Cuevas (DOM)	1:54:49.39	+2:17.88
13	Virgílio de Castilho (BRA)	1:55:17.24	+2:45.73
14	José Vivas (VEN)	1:55:31.71	+3:00.20
15	Velmar Bianco (ARG)	1:55:40.29	+3:08.78
16	Yean Jiménez (DOM)	1:55:52.82	+3:21.31
17	Carlos Rodríguez (CUB)	1:56:08.08	+3:36.57
18	Leonardo Saucedo (MEX)	1:56:26.50	+3:54.99
19	Javier Rosas (MEX)	1:56:49.99	+4:18.48
20	Felipe van de Wyngard (CHI)	1:56:53.86	+4:22.35
21	Luciano Farias (ARG)	1:57:03.47	+4:31.96
22	Ramon Alberich (CUB)	1:57:05.07	+4:33.56
23	Carlos Hernández (ESA)	1:57:44.19	+5:12.68
24	Gilberto González (VEN)	1:58:23.05	+5:51.54
25	Edgardo Vélez Rivera (PUR)	2:00:03.05	+7:31.54
26	Camilo González (VEN)	2:00:42.09	+8:10.58
27	Héctor Hernández (DOM)	2:03:43.52	+11:12.01
28	Guillermo Nantes (URU)	2:04:16.84	+11:45.33
29	Antônio Marcos (BRA)	2:06:50.94	+14:19.43
30	Benjamin Munizaga (CHI)	2:07:41.01	+15:09.50
—	Ricardo Cardeño (COL)	DNF	—
—	Luis Torrico (BOL)	DNF	—
—	Lucas Cocha (ARG)	DNF	—
—	Roberto Machado (CRC)	DNF	—
—	Marc DeCaul (GRN)	DNF	—
—	Carlos Friely (GUA)	DNF	—

== Women's competition ==
RANK	FINAL	TIME	DIFFERENCE
Gold medal	Julie Ertel (USA)	1:57:23.21	—
Silver medal	Sarah Haskins (USA)	1:57:46.23	+0:23.02
Bronze medal	Lauren Groves (CAN)	1:59:50.38	+2:27.17
4	Kathy Tremblay (CAN)	2:00:25.90	+3:02.69
5	Melody Angel Ramírez (MEX)	2:00:44.24	+3:21.03
5	Mariana Ohata (BRA)	2:00:51.28	+3:28.07
7	Adriana Corona (MEX)	2:01:00.46	+3:37.25
8	Barbara Riveros (CHI)	2:01:42.89	+4:19.68
9	Carla Moreno (BRA)	2:02:03.29	+4:40.08
10	Sara McLarty (USA)	2:02:07.68	+4:44.47
11	Paola Bonilla (ECU)	2:02:16.72	+4:53.51
12	Flora Duffy (BER)	2:03:13.92	+5:50.71
13	Yanitza Pérez (CUB)	2:03:49.24	+6:26.03
14	Alia Cardinale (CRC)	2:03:59.86	+6:36.65
15	Dunia Gómez Tirado (MEX)	2:04:20.30	+6:57.09
16	Pamela Geijo (ARG)	2:04:37.89	+7:14.68
17	Venus Rodríguez (CUB)	2:05:28.44	+8:05.23
18	Fiorella D'Croz (COL)	2:05:53.79	+8:30.58
19	Sandra Soldan (BRA)	2:06:35.99	+9:12.78
20	Rosemary López (VEN)	2:07:47.64	+10:24.43
21	Melissa Ríos la Luz (PUR)	2:09:01.49	+11:38.28
22	Elizabeth Bravo (ECU)	2:11:01.88	+13:38.67
23	Maydelen Justo (CUB)	2:11:21.32	+13:58.11
24	Monica Umana (CRC)	2:12:08.31	+14:45.10
25	Virginia López Argenta (URU)	2:15:18.67	+17:55.46
26	Nidia Kondratavicius (ARG)	2:15:46.76	+18:23.55
—	Maria Morales (COL)	DNF	—
—	Paulina Abrego (ARG)	DNF	—
—	Agnes Eppers (BOL)	DNF	—

== Medal table ==
Rank	Nation	Gold	Silver	Bronze	Total
1	United States	2	1	0	3
2	Canada	0	1	1	2
3	Brazil	0	0	1	1
Totals (3 entries)		2	2	2	6
