= Triathlon at the 2008 Summer Olympics – Qualification =

Eight National Olympic Committees could have a maximum of three eligible athletes per event, all other NOCs could have a maximum of two eligible athletes per event. Here follows the detailed attribution of the qualification places:

Event	Date	Location	Men	Women
Pan American Continental Olympic Qualifier	July 14, 2007	(Brazil) Rio de Janeiro	(United States) Andy Potts	(United States) Julie Ertel
African Continental Olympic Qualifier	March 8, 2008	(Tunisia) Hammamet	(South Africa) Hendrik De Villiers	(South Africa) Mari Rabie
Oceania Continental Olympic Qualifier	March 9, 2008	(New Zealand) Wellington	(New Zealand) Shane Reed	(Australia) Emma Moffatt
Asian Continental Olympic Qualifier	May 3, 2008	(China) Guanzhou	(Japan) Ryosuke Yamamoto	(Japan) Ai Ueda
European Continental Olympic Qualifier	May 10, 2008	(Portugal) Lisbon	(France) Frédéric Belaubre	(Portugal) Vanessa Fernandes
2008 Triathlon World Championships	June 8, 2008	(Canada) Vancouver	(Spain) Javier Gómez (New Zealand) Bevan Docherty (Switzerland) Reto Hug	(United Kingdom) Helen Tucker (United States) Sarah Haskins (New Zealand) Samantha Warriner
ITU Olympic Qualification Rankings	June 15, 2008	N/A	(Australia) Brad Kahlefeldt (Canada) Simon Whitfield (New Zealand) Kris Gemmell (United Kingdom) Tim Don (Ukraine) Volodymyr Polikarpenko (Germany) Maik Petzold (Germany) Jan Frodeno (Switzerland) Sven Riederer (United Kingdom) William Clarke (Germany) Daniel Unger (United Kingdom) Alistair Brownlee (France) Tony Moulai (Canada) Paul Tichelaar (Spain) Iván Raña (Russia) Igor Sysoev (Russia) Alexander Brukhankov (France) Cedric Fleureton (Czech Republic) Filip Ospalý (United States) Jarrod Shoemaker (Portugal) Bruno Pais (United States) Matthew Reed (Japan) Hirokatsu Tayama (Switzerland) Olivier Marceu (Russia) Dmitri Polyansky (Australia) Courtney Atkinson (Canada) Brent McMahon (Kazakhstan) Dmitriy Gaag (Poland) Marek Jaskolka (Denmark) Rasmus Henning (Italy) Daniel Fontana (Brazil) Reinaldo Colucci (Kazakhstan) Danyl Sapunov (Belgium) Peter Croes (Portugal) Duarte Marques (Belgium) Axel Zeebroek (Netherlands) Sander Berk (Austria) Simon Agoston (Estonia) Marko Albert (Luxembourg) Dirk Bockel (Italy) Emilio D'Aquino (Brazil) Juraci Moreira	(Australia) Emma Snowsill (New Zealand) Debbie Tanner (United States) Laura Bennett (Germany) Anja Dittmer (Germany) Joelle Franzman (United Kingdom) Hollie Avil (New Zealand) Andrea Hewitt (Switzerland) Nicola Spirig (Canada) Lauren Groves (Luxembourg) Elizabeth May (France) Jessica Harrison (Switzerland) Magali di Marco (Germany) Ricarda Lisk (Australia) Erin Densham (France) Carole Péon (Austria) Eva Dollinger (Japan) Kiyomi Niwata (Japan) Juri Ide (Italy) Nadia Cortassa (Sweden) Lisa Nordén (Switzerland) Daniela Ryf (Canada) Kathy Tremblay (Canada) Kirsten Sweetland (Czech Republic) Vendula Frintová (Spain) Ainhoa Murua (Russia) Irina Abyssova (South Africa) Kate Roberts (Brazil) Mariana Ohata (Austria) Tania Haiböck (Czech Republic) Lenka Zemanova (Spain) Ana Burgos (Austria) Kate Allen (Poland) Ewa Dederko (Republic of Ireland) Emma Davis (China) Xing Lin (Netherlands) Lisa Mensik (China) Wang Hongni (Poland) Maria Czesnik (Ukraine) Yuliya Spunova (Russia) Olga Zaousailova (Italy) Charlotte Bonin (Hungary) Zita Szabó (Netherlands) Birgitta Berk
ITU Continental Rankings^{[b]}	July 15, 2008	N/A	(Zimbabwe) Christopher Felgate (Mexico) Eligio Cervantes (Hong Kong) Daniel Lee Chi Wo (Slovakia) Pavel Simko	(Chile) Barbara Rivero Diaz (Hong Kong) Tania Mak So Ning (Greece) Deniz Dimaki
Host nation^{[a]}	N/A	N/A	(China) Zhang Yiming	
Tripartite Commission	Jan 31, 2008	N/A	(Syria) Omar Tayara	(Bermuda) Flora Duffy^{[c]}
Total	-	-	55	55

== Notes and references ==
Notes

- ^{a} China achieved qualification for the women's event through the ITU Olympic Qualification Ranking, therefore the host nation's Olympic place was given to another best placed athlete in the ITU Olympic Qualification Rankings;
- ^{b} Oceanian NOCs did not qualify any eligible male and female competitors through the Continental Olympic Ranking; the same situation was verified with African NOCs for the women's event. Thus, each of these qualification places were given to the next best placed athletes in the ITU Olympic Qualification Rankings;
- ^{c} Flora Duffy would qualify through her place in the ITU Olympic Qualification Ranking. Since she received an invitation from the tripartite commission, her slot was given to the next best placed athlete in the ITU Olympic Qualification Rankings.
