= Triathlon at the 2008 Summer Olympics – Men's =

Men's Triathlon at the Games of the XXIX Olympiad
- Venue: Triathlon Venue at the Ming Tomb Reservoir
- Date: 19 August
- Competitors: 55 from 31 nations
- Winning time: 1:48:53.28

Medalists
1st place, gold medalist(s)		Jan Frodeno	Germany
2nd place, silver medalist(s)		Simon Whitfield	Canada
3rd place, bronze medalist(s)		Bevan Docherty	New Zealand

The men's triathlon was part of the Triathlon at the 2008 Summer Olympics programme. It was the event's third appearance, established in 2000. The competition was held on Tuesday, August 19, 2008 at the Triathlon Venue at the Ming Tomb Reservoir in Shisanling. Fifty-five triathletes from 31 nations competed.

The men's triathlon was won by Jan Frodeno of Germany with a time of 1:48:53.28. Simon Whitfield of Canada, who previously won this event in 2000, claimed the silver, while New Zealand's Bevan Docherty, silver medalist at the 2004 Athens, took the bronze. For the first time in Olympic history, two athletes had won more than a single medal in triathlon.

== Competition format ==
The race was held over the "international distance" (also called "Olympic distance") and consisted of 1,500 metres (0.93 mi) swimming, 40 kilometres (25 mi), of road cycling, and 10 kilometres (6.2 mi) of road running.

== Results ==
Rank	#	Triathlete	Swimming	Cycling	Running	Total time^{*}	Difference
1st place, gold medalist(s)	32	Jan Frodeno (GER)	18:14	59:01	30:46	1:48:53.28	—
2nd place, silver medalist(s)	16	Simon Whitfield (CAN)	18:18	58:56	30:48	1:48:58.47	+5.19
3rd place, bronze medalist(s)	27	Bevan Docherty (NZL)	18:23	58:51	30:57	1:49:05.59	+12.31
4	30	Javier Gómez Noya (ESP)	18:08	59:06	31:03	1:49:13.92	+20.64
5	31	Iván Raña (ESP)	18:22	58:52	31:14	1:49:22.03	+28.75
6	34	Daniel Unger (GER)	18:25	58:49	31:35	1:49:43.78	+50.50
7	21	Hunter Kemper (USA)	18:04	59:06	31:40	1:49:48.75	+55.47
8	41	Rasmus Henning (DEN)	18:18	58:57	31:48	1:49:57.47	+1:04.19
9	26	Igor Sysoyev (RUS)	18:02	59:15	31:41	1:49:59.38	+1:06.10
10	38	Frédéric Belaubre (FRA)	18:03	59:11	31:48	1:50:00.30	+1:07.02
11	11	Courtney Atkinson (AUS)	18:06	59:08	32:00	1:50:10.02	+1:16.74
12	35	Alistair Brownlee (GBR)	18:11	59:05	32:07	1:50:19.62	+1:26.34
13	18	Axel Zeebroek (BEL)	18:30	57:48	33:15	1:50:30.90	+1:37.62
14	36	William Clarke (GBR)	18:53	58:23	32:18	1:50:32.07	+1:38.79
15	33	Christian Prochnow (GER)	18:23	58:56	32:21	1:50:33.90	+1:40.62
16	12	Brad Kahlefeldt (AUS)	18:17	58:56	32:26	1:50:36.00	+1:42.72
17	54	Bruno Pais (POR)	18:28	58:47	32:32	1:50:40.22	+1:46.94
18	23	Jarrod Shoemaker (USA)	18:19	59:03	32:27	1:50:46.39	+1:53.11
19	44	Olivier Marceau (SUI)	18:55	58:18	32:37	1:50:50.07	+1:56.79
20	42	Filip Ospaly (CZE)	18:17	58:56	32:41	1:50:53.69	+2:00.41
21	52	Danylo Sapunov (KAZ)	18:11	59:05	32:42	1:50:58.98	+2:05.70
22	25	Dmitry Polyanski (RUS)	18:15	59:07	32:53	1:51:11.61	+2:18.33
23	45	Sven Riederer (SUI)	18:14	58:52	33:11	1:51:19.45	+2:26.17
24	24	Alexander Brukhankov (RUS)	18:10	59:08	33:01	1:51:22.59	+2:29.31
25	55	Dirk Bockel (LUX)	18:26	57:52	34:19	1:51:31.01	+2:37.73
26	8	Juraci Moreira (BRA)	18:24	58:50	33:22	1:51:35.57	+2:42.29
27	17	Peter Croes (BEL)	18:26	58:51	33:25	1:51:40.94	+2:47.66
28	15	Paul Tichelaar (CAN)	18:24	58:51	33:34	1:51:46.81	+2:53.53
29	43	Reto Hug (SUI)	18:55	58:20	33:53	1:52:04.93	+3:11.65
30	6	Ryosuke Yamamoto (JPN)	18:27	58:53	33:56	1:52:11.98	+3:18.70
31	2	Sander Berk (NED)	18:13	59:06	33:57	1:52:18.09	+3:24.81
32	22	Matthew Reed (USA)	18:25	58:48	34:19	1:52:30.44	+3:37.16
33	10	Daniel Fontana (ITA)	18:22	58:55	34:26	1:52:39.21	+3:45.93
34	29	Shane Reed (NZL)	18:00	59:19	34:34	1:52:48.16	+3:54.88
35	19	Volodymyr Polikarpenko (UKR)	18:23	58:58	34:32	1:52:51.74	+3:58.46
36	40	Laurent Vidal (FRA)	18:49	58:24	34:51	1:53:02.79	+4:09.51
37	7	Reinaldo Colucci (BRA)	18:52	58:28	34:56	1:53:13.94	+4:20.66
38	47	Simon Agoston (AUT)	18:20	59:00	35:02	1:53:23.98	+4:30.70
39	28	Kris Gemmell (NZL)	18:41	58:34	35:42	1:53:49.47	+4:56.19
40	9	Emilio D'Aquino (ITA)	18:22	58:56	35:43	1:53:58.22	+5:04.94
41	4	Marko Albert (EST)	18:09	59:12	35:54	1:54:13.58	+5:20.30
42	20	Chris Felgate (ZIM)	18:21	59:00	36:09	1:54:31.61	+5:38.33
43	50	Daniel Lee Chi Wo (HKG)	18:54	58:24	36:22	1:54:40.78	+5:47.50
44	3	Francisco Serrano (MEX)	18:56	58:08	36:42	1:54:46.09	+5:52.81
45	53	Duarte Marques (POR)	18:20	59:06	36:47	1:55:06.57	+6:13.29
46	56	Wang Daqing (CHN)	18:06	59:15	37:17	1:55:41.87	+6:48.59
47	51	Csaba Kuttor (HUN)	18:09	59:13	37:27	1:55:53.38	+7:00.10
48	5	Hirokatsu Tayama (JPN)	18:04	59:12	37:58	1:56:13.68	+7:20.40
49	48	Omar Tayara (SYR)	18:23	58:56	38:19	1:56:40.54	+7:47.26
50	14	Colin Jenkins (CAN)	18:12	58:59	38:39	1:56:50.85	+7:57.57
—	39	Tony Moulai (FRA)	18:27	58:49	Did not finish		
—	37	Tim Don (GBR)	18:54	LAP			
—	49	Marek Jaskolka (POL)	18:55	LAP			
—	1	Andriy Glushchenko (UKR)	18:59	LAP			
—	46	Pavel Šimko (SVK)	Did not finish				

- * Including Transition 1 (swimming-to-cycling) and T2 (cycling-to-running), roughly a minute.
- No one is allotted the number 13.
- LAP – Lapped by the leader on the cycling course.
