= Triathlon at the 1999 Pan American Games =

This page shows the results of the triathlon competition at the 1999 Pan American Games in Winnipeg, Manitoba, Canada. The men's and the women's race were both held on Saturday July 24, 1999.

== Men's competition ==
| RANK | FINAL | TIME |
|---|---|---|
| Gold medal | Gilberto González (VEN) | 01:48:17 |
| Silver medal | Hunter Kemper (USA) | 01:48:49 |
| Bronze medal | Simon Whitfield (CAN) | 01:49:17 |
| 4 | Armando Barcellos (BRA) | 01:49:48 |
| 5 | Tim DeBoom (USA) | 01:49:50 |
| 6 | Mark Bates (CAN) | 01:49:55 |
| 7 | Daniel Fontana (ARG) | 01:50:04 |
| 8 | Javier Rosas (MEX) | 01:50:12 |
| 9 | Leandro Macedo (BRA) | 01:50:25 |
| 10 | Tony DeBoom (USA) | 01:50:31 |
| 11 | Uzziel Valderrabano (MEX) | 01:50:33 |
| 12 | Oscar Galíndez (ARG) | 01:50:49 |
| 13 | Ricardo Cardeno (COL) | 01:51:52 |
| 14 | Matias Brain (CHI) | 01:52:19 |
| 15 | Roland Melis (AHO) | 01:52:19 |
| 16 | Raul Lemir (ARG) | 01:53:01 |
| 17 | José Luis Zepeda (MEX) | 01:53:32 |
| 18 | Mario Santana (CUB) | 01:53:40 |
| 19 | José Rodriquez (CRC) | 01:53:41 |
| 20 | Luis Pérez (CUB) | 01:56:01 |

== Women's competition ==
| RANK | FINAL | TIME |
|---|---|---|
| Gold medal | Sharon Donnelly (CAN) | 01:59:14 |
| Silver medal | Carla Moreno (BRA) | 01:59:32 |
| Bronze medal | Carol Montgomery (CAN) | 02:00:14 |
| 4 | Jennifer Gutierrez (USA) | 02:00:57 |
| 5 | Jill Newman (USA) | 02:01:24 |
| 6 | Mariana Ohata (BRA) | 02:02:26 |
| 7 | Karen Smyers (USA) | 02:02:45 |
| 8 | Sandra Soldan (BRA) | 02:02:58 |
| 9 | Maria Morales (COL) | 02:04:16 |
| 10 | Isabelle Turcotte Baird (CAN) | 02:05:55 |
| 11 | Maria Luisa Martínez (MEX) | 02:06:13 |
| 12 | Nidia Kondratavicius (ARG) | 02:06:58 |
| 13 | Iona Wynter (JAM) | 02:07:29 |
| 14 | Yadira González (CUB) | 02:09:12 |
| 15 | Laura Leutich (ARG) | 02:10:14 |
| 16 | Agnes Eppers (BOL) | 02:11:00 |
| 17 | Maria Omar (ARG) | 02:13:18 |
| 18 | Karina Fernández (CRC) | 02:14:11 |
| 19 | Lara Mata (CRC) | 02:15:42 |
| 20 | Anmary Lopez (CUB) | 02:15:42 |

=== Medal table ===
* Host nation (Canada)

| Rank | Nation | Gold | Silver | Bronze | Total |
|---|---|---|---|---|---|
| 1 | Canada | 1 | 0 | 2 | 3 |
| 2 | Venezuela | 1 | 0 | 0 | 1 |
| 3 | Brazil | 0 | 1 | 0 | 1 |
| 3 | United States | 0 | 1 | 0 | 1 |
| Totals (4 entries) | | 2 | 2 | 2 | 6 |
