= Triathlon at the 2006 Central American and Caribbean Games =

- Location: Cartagena
- Dates: 28 July

This page shows the results of the triathlon competition at the 2006 Central American and Caribbean Games, held on July 28, 2006 in Cartagena, Colombia.

== Medal summary ==
=== Men's events ===
Event	Gold	Silver	Bronze
Individual	Eligio Cervantes (MEX)	Francisco Serrano (MEX)	Yean C. Veras (DOM)
Team	Mexico; Eligio Cervantes; Francisco Serrano	Dominican Republic; Yean C. Veras; Javier Cuevas	Venezuela; Camilo Gonzalez; Jose Vivas

=== Women's events ===
Event	Gold	Silver	Bronze
Individual	Adriana Corona (MEX)	Melody Ramirez (MEX)	Yarisel Romero (CUB)
Team	Mexico; Adriana Corona; Melody Ramirez	Cuba; Yarisel Romero; Yanitza Perez	Colombia; Carmenza Morales; Ibeth Aguiar

== Men's competition ==
Rank	Name	Time
Gold medal	Eligio Cervantes (MEX)	1:59:47
Silver medal	Francisco Serrano (MEX)	2:00:05
3	Arturo Garza (MEX)	2:00:41
Bronze medal	Yean C. Veras (DOM)	2:01:12
5	Javier Cuevas (DOM)	2:01:40
6	Leonardo Chacón (CRC)	2:01:44
7	Jorge Arias (COL)	2:01:54
8	Camilo González (VEN)	2:01:57
9	José Vivas (VEN)	2:02:29
10	Carlos Rafael Rodríguez (CUB)	2:02:59
11	Michel González (CUB)	2:03:34
12	Yacceri Leal (CUB)	2:04:32
13	Ricardo Cardeno (COL)	2:05:33
14	Manuel Ignacio Basterrechea (GUA)	2:06:10
15	Gerardo Basterrechea (GUA)	2:08:33
16	Julio César Ballestero (CRC)	2:11:09
17	Ernesto Cuevas (DOM)	2:11:36
18	Anthony Van Lierop (SUR)	2:11:44
19	Roberto Estuardo Vergara (GUA)	2:12:01
20	Roberto Machado (CRC)	2:15:15
21	Jean Paul Driessen (AHO)	2:21:23
22	Iwan Jonker (AHO)	2:24:16
23	Elliot Mason (ATG)	2:30:18
–	Marc DeCaul (GRN)	DNF
–	Oscar Fernandez Reyes (COL)	DNF
–	Gabriel Rojas (VEN)	DNF

Legend: DNF - Did not finish

== Women's competition ==
Rank	Name	Time
Gold medal	Adriana Corona (MEX)	2:17:27
Silver medal	Melody Ramírez (MEX)	2:18:25
Bronze medal	Yarisel Romero (CUB)	2:18:38
4	Maria Morales (COL)	2:19:36
5	Yanitza Perez (CUB)	2:20:01
6	Rosemary Lopez (VEN)	2:20:22
7	Dunia Gomez (MEX)	2:21:00
8	Venus Rodríguez (CUB)	2:23:15
9	Anahi Amado (GUA)	2:24:06
10	Gabriela Bolaños (GUA)	2:24:09
11	Ibeth Aguiar (COL)	2:24:36
12	Monica Umaña (CRC)	2:26:25
13	Patricia Marquez (VEN)	2:27:17
14	Maria Cristina Amador (GUA)	2:28:41
15	Rosmi Montero (VEN)	2:29:54
16	Alia Cardinale Villalobos (CRC)	2:30:33
17	Viviana Chavarria (CRC)	2:31:40
18	Natividad Torres (PUR)	2:36:05
–	Natalia Rodríguez (COL)	DNF
–	Marcía Rosario (PUR)	DNF

Legend: DNF - Did not finish
