= 2011 ITU Long Distance Triathlon World Championships =

International sports competition

World Long Distance Triathlon Championships
- Location: Henderson, Nevada, United States
- Date: 5 November 2011
- Competitors: 49 (26 men and 23 women)

Champions
- Men: Jordan Rapp (United States)
- Women: Rachel Joyce (United Kingdom)

The 2011 ITU Long Distance Triathlon World Championships was a bike-run competition held in Henderson, Nevada in United States on November 5 2011 and organized by the International Triathlon Union, now World Triathlon. The Elite races for men and consisted of a 120 km (75 mi) bike and 30 km (19 mi) run, longer than the standard 1.5 km swim, 40 km bike and 10 km run associated with the World Triathlon Championship Series and the Olympic Games, but shorter than the classic Ironman Triathlon event.

The swim leg and first transition of the original triathlon course were cancelled due to water temperatures, and organisers chose not include a compensatory second run leg to create a full duathlon. The bike leg was held as a partial time trial, with riders released at five second intervals.

A series of bike-runs were also held for age-group athletes.

== Medal Summary ==
Event	Gold		Silver		Bronze	
Men	Jordan Rapp; United States	5:00:15	Joe Gambles; Australia	5:02:57	Sylvain Sudrie; France	5:03:23
Women	Rachel Joyce; Great Britain	5:34:15	Leanda Cave; Great Britain	5:37:35	Meredith Kessler; United States	5:40:45

== Results ==
The following are the results of the elite races:

=== Men ===
29 male athletes enrolled, but three withdrew following the cancellation of the swim leg. A further three started but failed to complete the course, leaving 23 finishers, led home by home athlete Jordan Rapp.

Rank	Athlete	Nation	Swim	T1	Bike	T2	Run	Overall time
1st place, gold medalist(s)	Jordan Rapp	United States	—N/a	—N/a	3:09:20	1:23	1:49:31	5:00:15
2nd place, silver medalist(s)	Joe Gambles	Australia	—N/a	—N/a	3:09:17	1:12	1:52:28	5:02:57
3rd place, bronze medalist(s)	Sylvain Sudrie	France	—N/a	—N/a	3:09:13	1:45	1:52:25	5:03:23
4	Martin Jensen	Denmark	—N/a	—N/a	3:03:33	1:34	2:00:15	5:05:23
5	Nicholas Thompson	United States	—N/a	—N/a	3:18:51	1:50	1:50:58	5:11:38
6	Michael Raelert	Germany	—N/a	—N/a	3:12:42	1:12	1:57:47	5:11:41
7	Massimo Cigana	Italy	—N/a	—N/a	3:11:04	1:30	2:00:40	5:13:14
8	Esben Hovgaard	Denmark	—N/a	—N/a	3:19:45	1:58	1:55:06	5:16:49
9	Scott Neyedli	Great Britain	—N/a	—N/a	3:21:02	1:47	1:54:33	5:17:22
10	Petr Vabrousek	Czech Republic	—N/a	—N/a	3:23:57	1:31	1:53:19	5:18:47
11	Julien Loy	France	—N/a	—N/a	3:22:05	2:24	1:55:25	5:19:54
12	Miquel Blanchart	Spain	—N/a	—N/a	3:26:40	1:22	1:52:42	5:20:43
13	Nicholas Ward Munoz	Denmark	—N/a	—N/a	3:21:09	1:42	2:00:04	5:22:54
14	Dejan Patrcevic	Croatia	—N/a	—N/a	3:25:52	1:21	1:56:50	5:24:02
15	Richard Calle Martinez	Spain	—N/a	—N/a	3:20:09	1:22	2:03:07	5:24:37
16	Stephane Poulat	France	—N/a	—N/a	3:21:10	2:46	2:04:20	5:28:16
17	Clemens Coenen	Germany	—N/a	—N/a	3:18:32	1:50	2:08:27	5:28:48
18	Guilherme Manocchio	Brazil	—N/a	—N/a	3:28:05	3:01	2:02:24	5:33:29
19	Jaroslav Kovacic	Slovenia	—N/a	—N/a	3:32:38	1:27	1:59:37	5:33:41
20	Jordan Bryden	Canada	—N/a	—N/a	3:32:22	2:44	2:01:55	5:36:59
21	Kelmerson Henri Buck	Brazil	—N/a	—N/a	3:31:55	2:37	2:02:48	5:37:19
22	Rj Ross	Canada	—N/a	—N/a	3:34:04	2:47	2:02:24	5:39:15
23	Gerhard De Bruin	South Africa	—N/a	—N/a	3:25:47	1:38	2:13:50	5:41:15
-	Charles Perreault	Canada	—N/a	—N/a	3:30:49	1:39	-	DNF
-	Matteo Annovazzi	Italy	—N/a	—N/a	3:31:04	1:58	-	DNF
-	Peru Alfaro San Ildefonso	Spain	—N/a	—N/a	3:50:53	5:06	-	DNF
-	Karl-Johan Danielsson	Sweden	—N/a	—N/a	-	-	-	DNS
-	David Dellow	Australia	—N/a	—N/a	-	-	-	DNS
-	Felipe Manente	Brazil	—N/a	—N/a	-	-	-	DNS
Key : DNF - did not finish ; DNS - did not start

=== Women ===
26 athletes enrolled, but two withdrew following the cancellation of the swim leg, and a further three failed to complete the course, leaving 21 finishers, led home by Briton Rachel Joyce.

Rank	Athlete	Nation	Swim	T1	Bike	T2	Run	Overall time
1st place, gold medalist(s)	Rachel Joyce	Great Britain	—N/a	—N/a	3:33:09	1:36	1:59:31	5:34:15
2nd place, silver medalist(s)	Leanda Cave	Great Britain	—N/a	—N/a	3:36:42	1:34	1:59:20	5:37:35
3rd place, bronze medalist(s)	Meredith Kessler	United States	—N/a	—N/a	3:35:15	1:37	2:03:54	5:40:45
4	Nikki Butterfield	Australia	—N/a	—N/a	3:31:13	1:23	2:11:58	5:44:34
5	Malaika Homo	United States	—N/a	—N/a	3:36:41	1:23	2:08:34	5:46:37
6	Erika Csomor	Hungary	—N/a	—N/a	3:42:39	1:42	2:07:20	5:51:39
7	Tenille Hoogland	Canada	—N/a	—N/a	3:42:39	1:30	2:11:46	5:55:54
8	Michelle Vesterby	Denmark	—N/a	—N/a	3:39:32	1:57	2:15:06	5:56:34
9	Janine Sax	New Zealand	—N/a	—N/a	3:44:21	1:52	2:16:31	6:02:43
10	Ewa Bugdol	Poland	—N/a	—N/a	3:53:20	1:34	2:12:12	6:07:06
11	Danelle Kabush	Canada	—N/a	—N/a	3:53:42	1:37	2:14:28	6:09:47
12	Amanda Lovato	United States	—N/a	—N/a	3:52:42	1:54	2:15:46	6:10:21
13	Vanessa Gianinni	Brazil	—N/a	—N/a	3:56:03	2:02	2:13:31	6:11:36
14	Edith Niederfriniger	Italy	—N/a	—N/a	3:51:11	2:51	2:19:23	6:13:24
15	Margaret Bailey	Canada	—N/a	—N/a	3:54:00	1:46	2:19:42	6:15:28
16	Saori Ohmatsu	Japan	—N/a	—N/a	4:01:01	2:43	2:14:30	6:18:13
17	Yasuko Miyazaki	Japan	—N/a	—N/a	4:03:34	2:07	2:14:39	6:20:19
18	Natasha Gorie	South Africa	—N/a	—N/a	3:49:37	2:39	2:29:10	6:21:25
19	Christine Hemphill	Australia	—N/a	—N/a	3:55:25	1:29	2:26:44	6:23:37
20	Riana De Lange	South Africa	—N/a	—N/a	3:59:01	3:36	2:29:42	6:32:18
21	Talita Saab	Brazil	—N/a	—N/a	4:18:38	2:08	2:40:32	7:01:18
-	Caroline Steffen	Switzerland	—N/a	—N/a	3:29:40	1:58	-	DNF
-	Camilla Pedersen	Denmark	—N/a	—N/a	3:33:57	1:31	-	DNF
-	Tara Ross	Canada	—N/a	—N/a	4:07:45	1:46	-	DNF
-	Martina Dogana	Italy	—N/a	—N/a	-	-	-	DNS
-	Nike Zalokar Matanza	Slovenia	—N/a	—N/a	-	-	-	DNS
Key : DNF - did not finish ; DNS - did not start
