= Triathlon at the 2002 South American Games =

This page shows the results of the triathlon competition at the 2002 South American Games, held on August 10, 2002 in Rio de Janeiro, Brazil. For the second time the sport was a part of the multi-sports event. The race (1.5 km swimming, 40 km cycling and 10 km running) started at the Copacabana Beach (Posto 6).

== Men's competition ==
| Rank | Name | Swim | Bike | Run | Time |
|---|---|---|---|---|---|
| 1st place, gold medalist(s) | Leandro Macedo (BRA) | 20.57 | 58.31 | 32.03 | 1.51.32 |
| 2nd place, silver medalist(s) | Juraci Moreira (BRA) | 19.05 | 1.00.05 | 33.09 | 1.52.20 |
| 3rd place, bronze medalist(s) | Santiago Ascenco (BRA) | 21.40 | 57.43 | 33.35 | 1.53.00 |
| 4 | Daniel Fontana (ARG) | 19.31 | 59.56 | 34.07 | 1.53.36 |
| 5 | Ezequiel Morales (ARG) | 21.38 | 57.49 | 34.31 | 1.53.59 |
| 6 | Matias Optiz (CHI) | 20.58 | 58.31 | 35.46 | 1.55.16 |
| 7 | Velmar Bianco (ARG) | 20.56 | 58.33 | 36.08 | 1.55.38 |
| 8 | Felipe Teran (CHI) | 21.37 | 58.00 | 36.52 | 1.56.30 |
| 9 | Camilo González (VEN) | 21.41 | 1.01.31 | 34.11 | 1.57.24 |
| 10 | Guillermo Nantes (URU) | 21.23 | 58.08 | 38.18 | 1.57.50 |
| 11 | Juan Fernando Enderica (ECU) | 19.05 | 1.00.24 | 39.28 | 1.58.58 |
| 12 | Felipe van de Wyngard (CHI) | 19.03 | 1.00.33 | 40.10 | 1.59.48 |
| 13 | Agustin Fontes (VEN) | 21.24 | 1.01.51 | 36.50 | 2.00.06 |
| 14 | Ramiro Osorio (URU) | 20.55 | 58.46 | 41.02 | 2.00.44 |
| 15 | Melle van Schaik (ARU) | 25.16 | 1.03.27 | 37.00 | 2.05.44 |
| 16 | Victor Hugo Arevalo (ECU) | 21.17 | 1.09.02 | 39.31 | 2.09.51 |
| 17 | Alberto Snead (PAR) | 25.10 | 1.05.12 | 40.45 | 2.11.07 |
| 18 | Gelnnon Eights (ARU) | 21.39 | 1.08.31 | 43.24 | 2.13.35 |
| 19 | Ernesto Quintana (PAR) | 25.18 | 1.11.01 | 47.01 | 2.23.21 |
| 20 | Víctor Fernández (PAR) | 29.42 | 1.16.37 | 43.26 | 2.29.46 |
| — | Charles Sinchi-Roca (PER) | 27.46 | 1.03.10 | 42.26 | DSQ |
| — | Gabriel Boce (VEN) | — | — | — | DNS |

== Women's competition ==
| Rank | Name | Swim | Bike | Run | Time |
|---|---|---|---|---|---|
| 1st place, gold medalist(s) | Sandra Soldan (BRA) | 20.46 | 1.06.30 | 37.13 | 2.04.28 |
| 2nd place, silver medalist(s) | Nancy Álvarez (ARG) | 21.28 | 1.05.50 | 40.50 | 2.08.08 |
| 3rd place, bronze medalist(s) | Agnes Eppers (BOL) | 26.29 | 1.06.00 | 36.45 | 2.09.15 |
| 4 | Gisele Bertucci (BRA) | 21.27 | 1.05.47 | 43.23 | 2.10.37 |
| 5 | Ana Herrera (VEN) | 22.39 | 1.10.48 | 41.35 | 2.15.03 |
| 6 | Gabriela Tupayachi (PER) | 21.29 | 1.11.44 | 42.44 | 2.15.58 |
| 7 | María Soledad Omar (ARG) | 22.45 | 1.10.22 | 43.13 | 2.16.21 |
| 8 | Andrea Paola Bonilla (ECU) | 22.37 | 1.10.33 | 46.14 | 2.19.25 |
| 9 | Ligia Mora (VEN) | 24.59 | 1.18.29 | 37.01 | 2.20.30 |
| 10 | Claudia Pérez (ECU) | 21.54 | 1.11.21 | 47.15 | 2.20.32 |
| 11 | Paula Salazar (CHI) | 26.24 | 1.12.27 | 43.31 | 2.22.24 |
| 12 | Naula Rosa Susana (ECU) | 27.40 | 1.17.38 | 47.16 | 2.32.35 |
| 13 | Cecilia Ruiz Díaz (PAR) | 36.13 | 1.23.01 | 46.58 | 2.46.14 |
| — | Ana Paula Ortega (ARG) | — | — | — | DNF |

== See also ==
- Triathlon at the 2002 Central American and Caribbean Games
- Triathlon at the 2003 Pan American Games
