= Colin Jenkins =

Canadian triathlete

Personal information
- Born: March 2, 1983 (age 43) Hamilton, Ontario, Canada
- Home town: Brampton, Ontario, Canada
- Height: 1.88 m (6 ft 2 in)
- Weight: 75 kg (165 lb)

Sport
- Country: Canada

Colin Jenkins (born March 2, 1983) is a triathlete from Canada. He competed at the 2006 Commonwealth Games in Melbourne, and at the 2008 Summer Olympics in Beijing, along with his teammates Paul Tichelaar and Simon Whitfield. In his sporting career, Jenkins had won a silver medal at the 2006 ITU Pan American Cup in Brampton, Ontario, and achieved his first top eight finish at the 2007 ITU World Cup in Vancouver.

Jenkins was born in Hamilton, Ontario. He was selected to the Canadian triathlon team for the 2008 Summer Olympics in Beijing, with a plan to designate him as Whitfield's "domestique" – someone who keeps his competitor close during the early phases of the game. In the men's event, he allowed his teammate Whitfield to maintain pace over the 1.5 km swim course, and repeatedly chased down the breakaways of the 40-km cycling race, with the latter drafting behind. Whitfield moved on to capture the silver medal at the end of the course. Jenkins, however, finished in last place, with the time of 1:56:50, just nearly eight minutes behind the former Olympic champion. His placement in the men's triathlon later became regarded as one of the greatest fiftieth-place finishes in Summer Olympic history, after playing a critical role in helping Canada win its second-ever Olympic medal.

After the Olympics, Jenkins retired from triathlon to work as a firefighter in Toronto. In November 2010, he was elected to Triathlon Canada's Board of Directors by the organization's national elite athletes, and served his major role as an athlete's representative.
