= Gilberto González =

Gilberto González may refer to:

- Gilberto González (actor) (1906–1954), Mexican actor
- Gilberto González (triathlete) (born 1970), triathlete from Venezuela
