= Duarte Marques =

Duarte Marques may refer to:

- Duarte Marques (politician) (born 1981), Portuguese consultant and politician
- Duarte Marques (triathlete) (born 1983), Portuguese triathlete
