= Siri Lindley =

American triathlon coach (born 1968 or 1969)

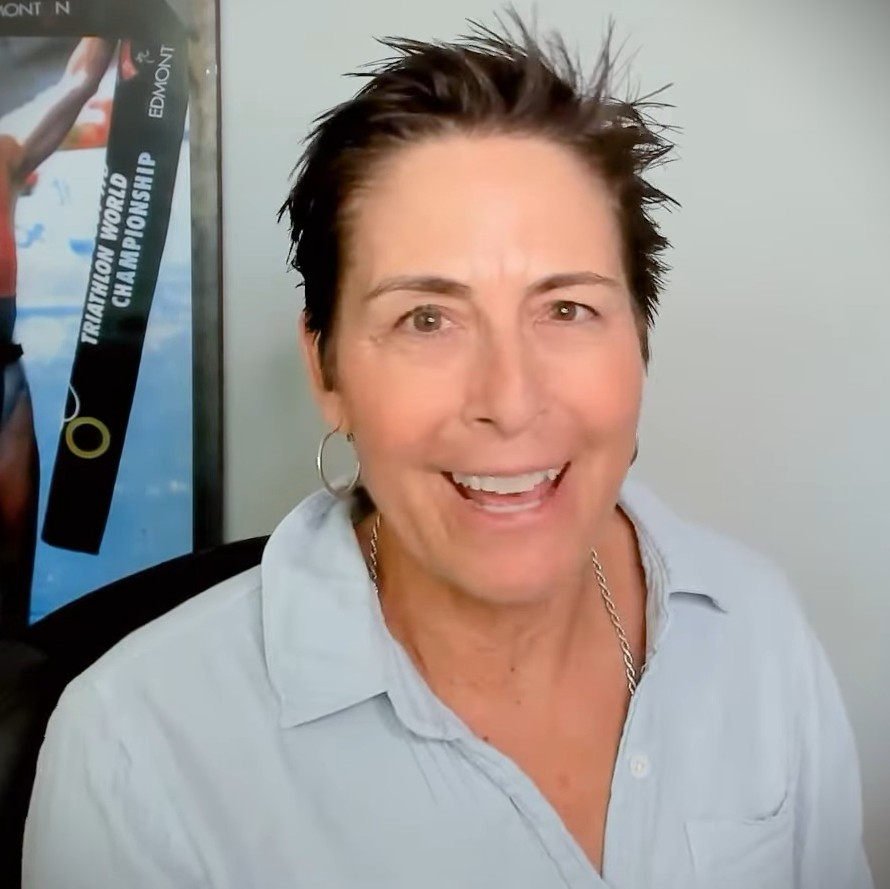
- Lindley in 2024

Personal information
- Full name: Siri Elizabeth Lindley
- Born: 1968 or 1969 (age 56–57) Greenwich, Connecticut, U.S.
- Occupation: Triathlon coach/Keynote Speaker/Animal Welfare Activist

Sport
- Sport: Triathlon
- Team: Team Sirius
- Turned pro: 1996
Medal record
Representing United States
Women's triathlon
ITU World Championships
Gold medal – first place	2001 Edmonton	Elite
ITU Triathlon World Cup
Gold medal – first place	2001	Elite
Gold medal – first place	2002	Elite
ITU Duathlon World Championships
Silver medal – second place	2000	Elite
ITU Aquathlon World Championships
Gold medal – first place	2001	Elite

Siri Lindley (born 1968 or 1969) is an American triathlon coach and former professional triathlete. She is the 2001 ITU Triathlon World Champion as well as the winner of the 2001 and 2002 ITU Triathlon World Cup series and 2001 ITU Aquathlon World Championships. She has coached a number of Olympic and Ironman athletes and champions, including Mirinda Carfrae, Leanda Cave, Sarah True, and Susan Williams. In 2014, she was selected to be a member of the inaugural International Triathlon Union (ITU) Hall of Fame class.

In addition to her athletic and coaching career, Lindley works as a public speaker. She has also worked as a television sports analyst covering triathlon and field hockey events for NBC during the 2004 Summer Olympics. She has reported on NCAA Field Hockey, the NCAA Final Four, and the Big 10 Tournament for NBC, CSTV, and TVNZ.

== Career ==
=== Triathlon ===
Lindley grew up in Greenwich, Connecticut, as an athletic and shy child. She attended Greenwich High School, where she played field hockey, ice hockey, and lacrosse. She later attended Brown University, where she played at the varsity level in the same three sports and graduated with a degree in psychology. Following graduation, she spent two years coaching field hockey and lacrosse – one year at Princeton University and one year at Lehigh University.

In 1992 Lindley competed in her first triathlon without having much prior knowledge or training in swimming. She trained while working 60-hour weeks at a local YMCA in Worcester, Massachusetts.

In 1996 she began competing in ITU World Cup races and was consistently producing top-10 finishes in 1999 under coach Jack Ralston. By 2000 she was focusing on qualifying for the 2000 Summer Olympics, the year the triathlon was making its first appearance in the Olympic program. At the U.S. Olympic Trials in Dallas, Lindley failed to take one of the top two spots in the race to qualify, but instead took third and accompanied the team to Sydney as an alternate. Thereafter, she made some changes in her training, including joining coach Brett Sutton's squad at the suggestion of Loretta Harrop. Soon after joining his squad, Sutton had her race in the 2000 ITU Duathlon World Championships, where she took second place.

In 2001, she won six consecutive ITU World Cup races and captured the ITU World Championship title, accumulating enough points to be ranked as the top female ITU triathlete in the world. The next year, in 2002, she maintained her No. 1 ranking while repeating as the winner of the World Cup series. After that year, she decided to retire from triathlon competition to pursue what she considered her true career calling as a coach. She credits much of her success in 2001 and 2002, when she won 11 World Cup races, as well as her success as a coach, to Sutton.

=== Post-racing ===
Among her accomplishments as a coach is coaching Susan Williams to an Olympic Bronze medal at the 2004 Olympics, and Mirinda Carfrae to three Ironman World Championships. and one 70.3 World Championship 2007. In 2012, Lindley also coached Leanda Cave to an Ironman World Championship and a 70.3 World Championship in the same year.

Lindley is the author of Surfacing: From the Depths of Self-Doubt to Winning Big and Living Fearlessly. Additionally, she is a speaker with Carter Global Speakers as well as being involved in speaking engagements with Tony Robbins. She is the co-founder of Believe Ranch and Rescue, a non-profit focused on rescuing horses from slaughter. For this work Denver7 awarded Lindley and her spouse Keat the 7Everyday Heroes Award for their work saving horses from slaughter and caring for them or finding them homes.

== Personal ==
Lindley is married to former professional triathlete Rebekah Keat. In November 2019 she was diagnosed with acute myeloid leukemia and participated in a clinical trial at the University of Colorado Anschutz Medical Campus. The following year she was declared cancer-free after receiving results from her latest bone marrow biopsy.

== ITU results ==
Results list

Date	Position	Event	Venue	Total time
November 9, 2002	13	ITU Triathlon World Championships	Cancún	2:04:10
September 7, 2002	2	ITU Triathlon World Cup	Hamburg	1:57:56
August 31, 2002	1	ITU Triathlon World Cup	Lausanne	2:02:42
August 18, 2002	1	ITU Triathlon European Cup	Geneva	2:18:07
July 28, 2002	1	ITU Triathlon World Cup	Tiszaujvaros	1:57:04
July 21, 2002	1	ITU Triathlon World Cup	Corner Brook	2:05:43
July 14, 2002	1	ITU Triathlon World Cup	Edmonton	2:01:33
May 19, 2002	7	ITU Triathlon World Cup	Ishigaki	2:02:17
March 31, 2002	3	ITU Triathlon World Cup	Geelong	2:03:05
March 17, 2002	1	ITU Triathlon Oceania Cup	Devonport	2:02:21
September 2, 2001	4	ITU Triathlon Oceania Cup	Brisbane	2:02:42
August 25, 2001	1	ITU Triathlon World Cup	Lausanne	2:07:08
August 18, 2001	1	ITU Triathlon World Cup	Tiszaújváros	1:56:47
July 29, 2001	1	ITU Triathlon World Cup	Corner Brook	2:03:16
July 22, 2001	1	ITU Triathlon World Championship	Edmonton	1:58:50
July 7, 2001	1	ITU Triathlon World Cup	Toronto	2:00:04
May 13, 2001	1	ITU Triathlon World Cup	Rennes	1:59:32
April 22, 2001	3	ITU Triathlon World Cup	Ishigaki	1:58:15
April 15, 2001	6	ITU Triathlon World Cup	Gamagori	1:58:26
November 5, 2000	1	ITU Triathlon World Cup	Cancún	1:57:52
October 8, 2000	2	ITU Triathlon World Cup	Calais	2:02:03
August 12, 2000	1	ITU Triathlon World Cup	Lausanne	2:05:22
August 6, 2000	2	ITU Triathlon World Cup	Tiszaújváros	1:55:16
July 8, 2000	6	ITU Triathlon World Cup	Toronto	1:58:48
April 30, 2000	10	ITU Triathlon World Championships	Perth	1:56:01
November 7, 1999	4	ITU Triathlon World Cup	Noosa	1:56:40
August 8, 1999	8	ITU Triathlon World Cup	Tiszaújváros	1:59:04
June 20, 1999	5	ITU Triathlon World Cup	Monte Carlo	2:03:02
June 13, 1999	5	ITU Triathlon World Cup	Kapelle-op-den-Bos	1:57:36
May 2, 1999	4	ITU Triathlon World Cup	Sydney	2:04:24
April 18, 1999	4	ITU Triathlon World Cup	Gamagori	1:55:26
April 11, 1999	10	ITU Triathlon World Cup	Ishigaki	2:02:29
November 8, 1998	13	ITU Triathlon World Cup	Noosa	2:04:13
November 1, 1998	7	ITU Triathlon World Cup	Auckland	2:01:43
September 27, 1998	6	ITU Triathlon World Cup	Cancún	2:05:15
August 30, 1998	15	ITU Triathlon World Championships	Lausanne	2:12:35
July 18, 1998	7	PATCO Triathlon North American Championships	Los Cabos	2:15:01
November 16, 1997	22	ITU Triathlon World Championships	Perth	2:04:10
October 12, 1997	12	ITU Triathlon World Cup	Cancún	2:04:21
November 3, 1996	14	ITU Triathlon World Cup	Noosa	2:05:08
August 24, 1996	29	ITU Triathlon World Championships	Cleveland	1:58:45
June 30, 1996	16	ITU Triathlon World Cup	Hamilton	1:56:58

== Awards ==
- 2023 World Triathlon Hall of Fame
- 2018 Boulder Colorado Sports Hall of Fame
- 2016 USA Triathlon Hall of Fame
- 2014 International Triathlon Union Hall of Fame
- 2007 Brown Athletic Hall of Fame
- 2001 Female Duathlete of the Year
- 2001 Triathlon Magazine's Triathlete of the Year
