= Triathlon at the 2002 Central American and Caribbean Games =

This page shows the results of the triathlon competition at the 2002 Central American and Caribbean Games, held on November 28, 2002, in San Salvador, El Salvador. For the second time the sport was a part of the multi-sports event.

== Men's individual competition ==
Rank	Name	Swim	Bike	Run	Time
1st place, gold medalist(s)	Javier Rosas (MEX)	20:49	57:11	35:18	1:54:50
2nd place, silver medalist(s)	Eligio Cervantes (MEX)	20:59	58:58	34:13	1:55:36
3rd place, bronze medalist(s)	Gilberto González (VEN)	20:19	59:30	34:38	1:56:02
4	Leonardo Chacón (CRC)	20:49	57:14	37:15	1:56:51
5	Ricardo Cardeño (COL)	21:43	58:18	35:36	1:57:07
6	José Luis Zepeda (MEX)	20:23	59:32	36:25	1:57:54
7	Carlos Friedly (GUA)	23:38	58:42	35:13	1:59:03
8	José Rodríguez (CRC)	20:59	59:00	38:39	2:00:08
9	Yean Jiménez (DOM)	20:53	58:59	39:11	2:00:39
10	Octavio Salazar (COL)	20:56	59:09	39:07	2:00:50
11	Roberto Machado (CRC)	21:44	1:00:37	37:10	2:00:59
12	Carlos Hernández Gómez (ESA)	21:04	58:50	39:46	2:01:15
13	Carlos Alberto Lomba (PUR)	20:47	59:06	40:04	2:01:34
14	David Gonzales Paniagua (GUA)	23:36	58:41	37:58	2:01:46
15	Anthony van Lierop (SUR)	20:51	57:03	42:23	2:02:00
16	Agustin Fontes (VEN)	21:39	1:00:41	38:11	2:02:01
17	Carlos Rivera Alfaro (ESA)	21:45	1:00:33	39:04	2:03:01
18	Jonathan Monsanto (DOM)	24:06	1:00:50	38:26	2:05:09
19	José Daniel Vivas (VEN)	20:16	59:42	47:34	2:09:16
20	Juan Carlos Padró (PUR)	24:08	1:01:01	42:35	2:09:34

== See also ==
- Triathlon at the 2002 South American Games
- Triathlon at the 2003 Pan American Games
