= Wang Daqing =

Chinese triathlete

Wang Daqing (born October 13, 1989 in Lianyungang, Jiangsu) is a triathlete from China, who solely competed in the men's event at the 2008 Summer Olympics in Beijing. He finished forty-sixth in the event with the time of 1:55:40, just seven minutes behind the winner.

At the peak of his career, Wang took part in ten ITU and Asian Cup competitions, and has achieved seven top ten finishes. His best result happened at the 2009 ASTC Triathlon Asian Championships in Incheon, South Korea, where he placed third.
