= Adriana Corona =

Mexican triathlete (born 1980)

Personal information
- Full name: Adriana Fabiola Corona García
- Born: 7 April 1980 (age 46) Guadalajara, Jalisco
- Height: 1.70 m (5 ft 7 in)
- Weight: 60 kg (132 lb)

Sport
- Country: Mexico
Medal record
Women's triathlon
Representing Mexico
Central American and Caribbean Games
Gold medal – first place	2006 Cartagena	Women's individual
Gold medal – first place	2006 Cartagena	Women's team

Adriana Fabiola Corona García (Note: In this Spanish name, the first or paternal surname is Corona and the second or maternal family name is García.) (born April 7, 1980), known as Adriana Corona, is a Mexican triathlete, who won two gold medals at the 2006 Central American and Caribbean Games in Cartagena, Colombia.

Corona started out her sporting career as an adventurer and cross-country racer in 2000, until she began with triathlon at the ITU Triathlon Pan American Cup in Puerto Vallarta two years later. In 2005, she finally reached into the international scene, and made a comeback in triathlon after pursuing her full-time sporting career in mountain biking. In the same year, she had also achieved her first medal, by claiming the silver at the ITU Triathlon Pan American Cup in Ixtapa. Corona competed at the 2006 Central American and Caribbean Games, where she won gold medals in the women's individual and team events, along with her compatriot Melody Ramirez. Corona's best result in these games contributed to her qualifying place for the 2007 Pan American Games in Rio de Janeiro, where she placed seventh in the women's event, and consequently, for the 2008 Summer Olympics in Beijing. At the Olympics, Corona maintained her pace in a field of fifty-five competitors during the swimming leg, but she got lapped by the leader in the road cycling course.
