= Sebastian Dehmer =

German triathlete (born 1982)

Sebastian Dehmer (born February 14, 1982, in Darmstadt) is a German triathlete. Dehmer competed at the second Olympic triathlon at the 2004 Summer Olympics. He placed twenty-sixth with a total time of 1:57:39.28.
