= Margaret Bailey =

Margaret Bailey may refer to:

- Margaret Ann Montgomery Bailey (1879–1955), Australian headmistress
- Margaret E. Bailey (1915–2014), first black United States Army Nurse Corps colonel
- Margaret Jewett Smith Bailey (c.1812–1882), American pioneer, missionary, and author from Oregon
- Margaret Bailey Chandler (1929–1997), American community leader
- Margaret L. Bailey (1812-1888), American journalist and anti-slavery activist
