= Jennifer Gutierrez (triathlete) =

American triathlete

Personal information
- Full name: Jennifer Ann Gutierrez
- Born: April 28, 1967 (age 58); San Antonio, Texas, U.S.
- Height: 5 ft 2 in (157 cm)
- Weight: 115 lb (52 kg)

Jennifer Ann Gutierrez (born April 28, 1967) is a triathlete from the United States.

Gutierrez competed at the first Olympic triathlon at the 2000 Summer Olympics and she was the first American to qualify as a triathlete for the 2000 Olympics. She took thirteenth place with a total time of 2:03:38.48.

Gutierrez graduated from Oliver Wendell Holmes High School in San Antonio, Texas. She is a graduate of Pepperdine University where she was a four-year letter winner in swimming. She did her first triathlon in 1994 and became a professional in 1995. She placed fourth at the 1999 Pan American Games.
