= Jordan Rapp =

American triathlete

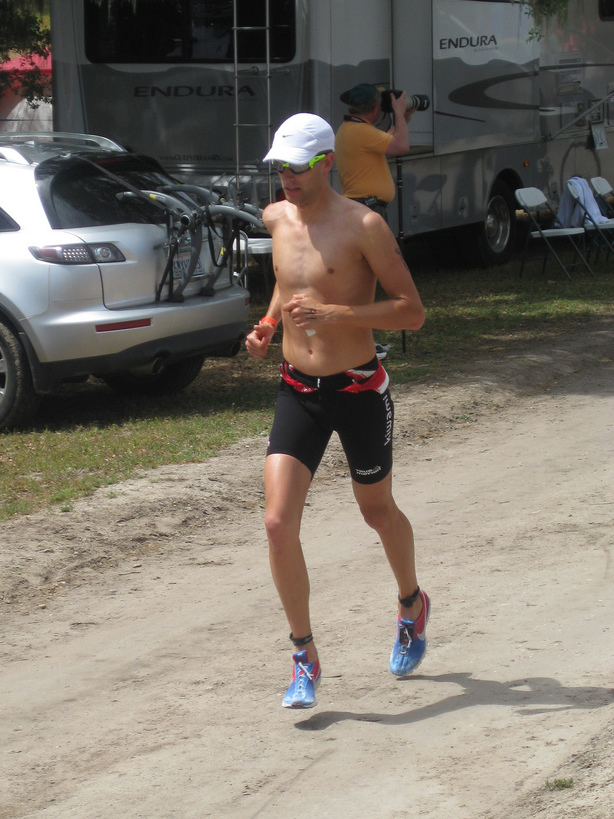
- Rapp running in the 2009 Wildflower Triathlon

Personal information
- Nickname: Rappstar
- Born: July 28, 1980 (age 45)
- Height: 6 ft 3 in (1.91 m)
- Weight: 155 lb (70 kg)

Sport
- Country: United States
- Sport: Triathlon
- Turned pro: 2005
- Coached by: Michael Kruger
Medal record
Representing United States
Triathlon
ITU Long Distance World Championships
Gold medal – first place	2011	Individual

Jordan Rapp (born July 28, 1980) is an American professional triathlete. He is the 2011 ITU Long Distance Triathlon world champion. He has won 8 long distance, multi-sport events, including five Ironman Triathlon competitions.

== Athletic career ==
Rapp was born in New York City. He spent time growing up in Tokyo, Japan and a small cabin in upstate New York during the summers. At age 9 Rapp's family moved permanently to the suburbs north of New York City along the Hudson River. In high school he played sports such as squash and lacrosse. He attended Princeton University, where he was on the rowing team. After an injury training for the U.S. National Team, he began competing in triathlons.

He had already won two Ironman competitions when, on March 23, 2010, when he was a victim of a hit and run car accident while out riding his bike. Rapp suffered numerous broken bones including his clavicle and scapula, as well as contusions and lacerations about the head and neck. Rapp lost between two and three liters of blood as a result of the accident. His life was saved by Chief Petty Officer Thomas Sanchez, who came across the accident and put pressure on Rapp's severed jugular. The suspect, Marco Garcia-Ortiz, 27, was thought to have fled to Mexico.

Recovery took months, but Rapp returned to win Ironman Canada in August 2011, followed by several other long distance multisport events.

== Personal life ==
Rapp resides in Thousand Oaks, CA & Penticton, BC with his wife, Jill Savege and son, Quentin Thomas Rapp (born Jun 21, 2011). In addition to his career as a professional triathlete, he is Chief Technology Officer for Slowtwitch.com.

Every year, as part of his participation in World Bicycle Relief, he gives away his bike to a worthy applicant as well as raising funds for the charity.

== Notable results ==
Rapp's notable achievements include:

- 2019: Masters National Track Cycling Championships 3k Individual Pursuit - 1st
- 2015: Ironman Mont-Tremblant - 1st
- 2012: Leadman Epic 250, Bend, OR - 1st
- 2012: Ironman New York - U.S. Championships - 1st
- 2012: Ironman Texas - 1st§
- 2011: ITU Long Distance World Championships - 1st
- 2011: Ironman Canada - 1st
- 2011: Leadman Epic 250, Las Vegas - 1st
- 2009: Ironman Arizona - 1st∞‡
- 2009: Ironman Canada - 1st

‡ bike course record
∞ course record
§ run course record
