= Omar Tayara =

Spanish-born aquathlete and triathlete (born 1979)

Personal information
- Full name: Omar Tayara Rodríguez
- Born: 13 August 1979 (age 46) Madrid, Spain
- Height: 1.75 m (5 ft 9 in)
- Weight: 65 kg (143 lb)

Sport
- Country: Spain; Syria
- Team: Trialandalus Mijas (ESP), Syrian National Team (SYR)
- Coached by: Ricardo Claveria Grimaldos

Omar Tayara Rodríguez (born August 13, 1979 in Madrid) is a Spanish-born aquathlete and triathlete, who trains and holds a dual citizenship with Syria.

Tayara started out his triathlon career in 2001, and first competed at the 2002 ITU Triathlon European Cup in Palermo, Italy. He eventually made his international debut at the 2004 ITU World Cup in his home turf, followed by his other sporting appearances in Cancun and in Hamburg. While competing for Spain, Tayara had won the ITU Aquathlon World Championships in Lausanne, Switzerland, and achieved a third-place finish at the Pan American Cup in Roatán, Honduras. In 2006, Tayara officially gained Syrian citizenship.

While competing for Syria, Tayara had achieved top six finishes in two Asian cups, and held Olympic qualifying points. He was selected for the national team to compete for the men's triathlon at the 2008 Summer Olympics in Beijing. Tayara was not sufficiently enough to keep up his pace, as he finished only in forty-ninth place, with a time of 1:56:40.
