= Sharon Donnelly =

Canadian triathlete (born 1967)

Personal information
- Born: July 29, 1967 (age 59) Toronto, Ontario, Canada

Sport
- Sport: Triathlon
Medal record
Women's Triathlon
Representing Canada
Pan American Games
Gold medal – first place	1999 Winnipeg	Individual

Sharon Lynn Donnelly (born July 29, 1967) is an athlete from Canada, who competed in triathlon (1.5-km swim, 40-km cycle, 10-km run).

Donnelly graduated from the Royal Military College of Canada in 1990, (17324) with a B.A. (Commerce), and served as an Army Logistics Officer for 5 years. She won the gold medal at the 1999 Pan American Games in Winnipeg, Manitoba, Canada.

To pursue a spot on the 2000 Olympic team, Donnelly transferred to the Reserves in 1995 and competed at the first Olympic triathlon at the 2000 Summer Olympics. She took thirty-eighth place with a total time of 2:14:35.59. She continued racing with an aim of making a second Olympic team in 2004 but missed inclusion by 22 seconds. She was a Team Alternate for Athens 2004 Olympics.

In the fall of 2004, Donnelly retired from the sport and the Reserves. She was Race Director for the inaugural Canadian Forces Base triathlon in Kingston, Ontario in May 2004. She taught physical education at Saint Lawrence College, and coached local junior, age group triathletes.

Since moving to Colorado Springs in 2006, Donnelly has worked at the United States Olympic Training Centre as assistant National Triathlon Team coach.
