= Christian Prochnow =

German duathlete and triathlete (born 1982)

Personal information
- Nickname: Paule
- Born: 19 June 1982 (age 44)
- Height: 1.89 m (6 ft 2 1/2 in)
- Weight: 78 kg (172 lb)

Sport
- Country: Germany
- Team: ASICS Team Witten, Deutsche Triathlon Union
- Turned pro: 2002
- Coached by: Ron Schmid

Christian Prochnow (born 19 June 1982 in Potsdam) is a duathlete and triathlete from Germany. He is currently ranked no. 23 in the world by the International Triathlon Union (ITU), and also, a member of Deutsche Triathlon Union since 2002. Prochnow started out his sporting career in 1997, and then, he had won several local and national duathlon and triathlon championships, including the 2001 European Junior Triathlon Championship title for his national team.

Prochnow was selected to the German national triathlon team, along with his teammates Daniel Unger and Jan Frodeno, for the 2008 Summer Olympics in Beijing. He placed fifteenth in men's triathlon with a time of 1:50:33, just nearly two minutes from Frodeno, who won gold in this event.
