= Julie Ertel =

American water polo player (born 1972)

Personal information
- Nationality: American
- Born: Julie Swail -Ertel; December 27, 1972 (age 53) Anaheim, California
- Height: 68 in (173 cm)
- Weight: 134 lb (61 kg)

Sport
- Sport: Water Polo, Triathlon
- Position: Driver/Attacker (WP)
- College team: University of California San Diego
- Coached by: Denny Harper (U. Cal San Diego); Guy Baker (2000 Olympics)
Medal record
Women's water polo
Representing the United States
Olympic Games
Silver medal – second place	2000 Sydney	Team competition
Women's triathlon
Representing the United States
Pan American Games
Gold medal – first place	2007 Rio de Janeiro	Individual race

Julie Ertel (née Swail; born December 27, 1972) is an American water polo player who competed for the University of California San Diego, and was the team captain of the US Women's National Team that captured the silver medal at the 2000 Summer Olympics. She competed in Triathlon at the 2008 Beijing Olympics.

Julie Swail was born December 27, 1972 in Anaheim, California and attended and graduated Valencia High School in Placentia, California. She competed on Valencia's swim team, and later played and acted as team captain on the Boy's Water Polo team.

== University of California San Diego ==
Ertel is a graduate of the University of California, San Diego where she played water polo from 1992-1995 under USA Water Polo Hall of Fame Coach Denny Harper, who coached at U. Cal. San Diego for forty-two years. Playing water polo for U. Cal San Diego, at the time of her graduation, she was first in career goals with 245, and first in shooting percentage with a .460 average in goals per shot. As team captain in 1993–1995, she helped lead the U. Cal San Diego water polo team to national championships in both 1992, and 1994. During her four year playing tenure, the team had a record of 89-17. In 1995, Ertel was voted the U. Cal San Diego Outstanding Senior Student-Athlete, and in 2002 won the Distinguished Alumni Award.

She later received an M.Ed. in Physical Education from Azusa Pacific University.

From 1993-2001, Swail competed for the U.S. National Water Polo Team.

== 2000, 2008 Olympics ==
Swail Ertel was captain of the US Women's National Team that won the silver medal at the 2000 Sydney Olympic Water Polo Team competition, where she was trained and mentored by Hall of Fame Olympic Head Coach Guy Baker. The Australian team took the gold medal, and the Russian Federation team took the bronze.

She competed in the triathlon at the 2008 Summer Olympics in Beijing, taking 19th place crossing the finish line in a time of 2:02:39.22, 4:11.56 behind the gold medalist. In 2002, she won the World triathlon championship, and was a U.S. triathlon champion three times.

=== Honors ===
Swail Ertel was voted to the University of California San Diego Hall of Fame Class of 2013.

=== Careers ===
Ertel has coached water polo at U.C. Irvine, and has been a Physical Education teacher at Orange Coast Community College. She has more recently served on the advisory board for MODe Sports Nutrition.

== See also ==
- List of Olympic medalists in water polo (women)
