= Jill Savege =

Canadian triathlete (born 1974)

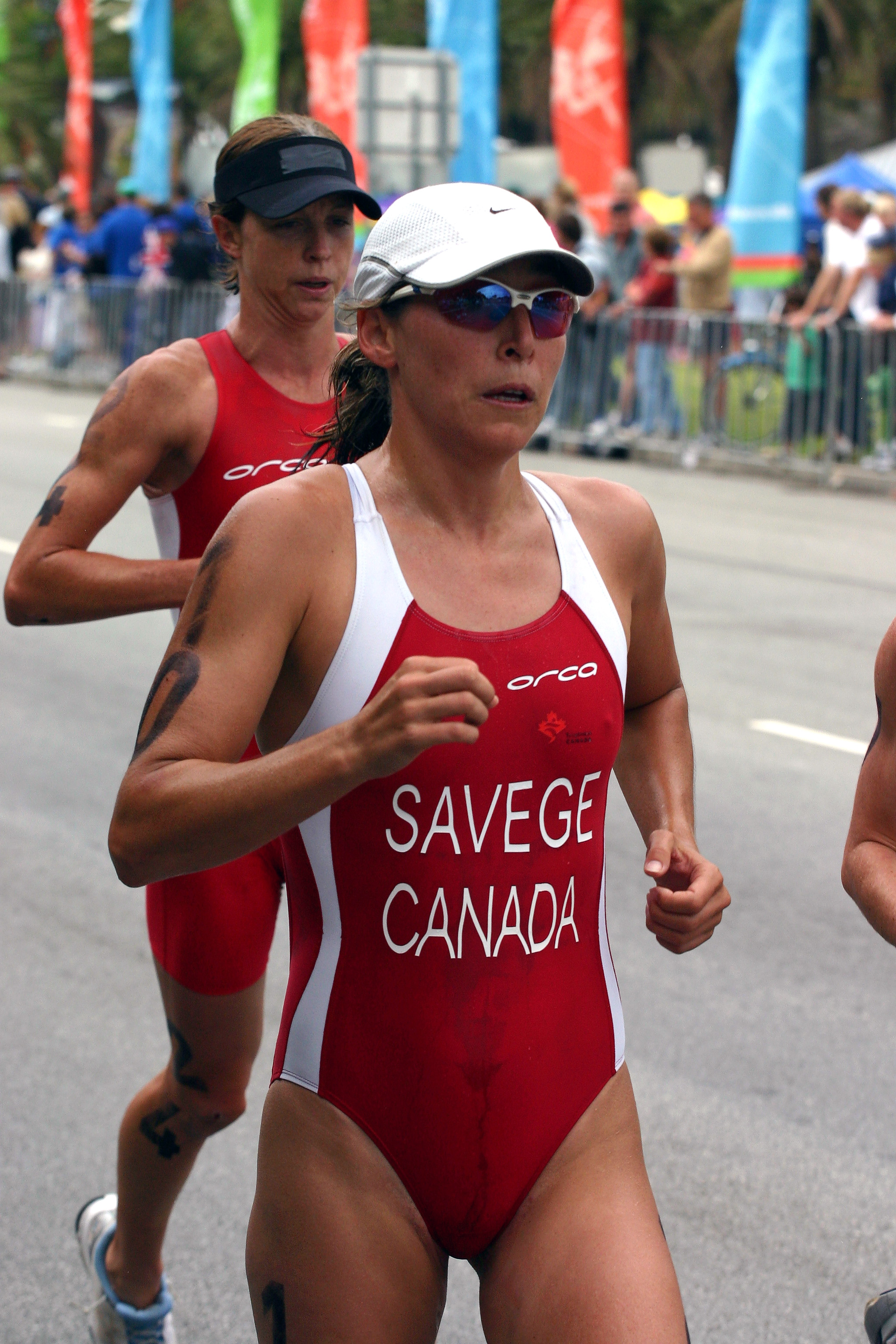
- Savege at the 2006 Commonwealth Games.

Personal information
- Born: March 17, 1974 (age 52) Toronto, Ontario, Canada
Medal record
Women's Triathlon
Representing Canada
Pan American Games
Gold medal – first place	2003 Santo Domingo	Individual Race

Jill Savege (born March 17, 1974) is a Canadian triathlete. Born in Toronto, Ontario, Savege now lives in Thousand Oaks, California. A graduate of Simon Fraser University, she was a swimmer while a student and only turned to triathlon after graduation.

In 2003 Savege had an excellent year capturing a number of world circuit titles and winning gold at the Pan-American Games. She was ranked as one of the best in the world. However, a number of injuries have since deprived her of top form. She was still considered a medal contender at the 2004 Summer Olympics and was going in ranked fourth in the world. However, early in the cycling stage of the Olympic triathlon she crashed and only finished 39th with a time of 2:18:10.99.

== Personal life ==
Savege is married to Jordan Rapp, the 2011 ITU Long Distance Triathlon world champion.
