= Axel Zeebroek =

Belgian triathlete (born 1978)

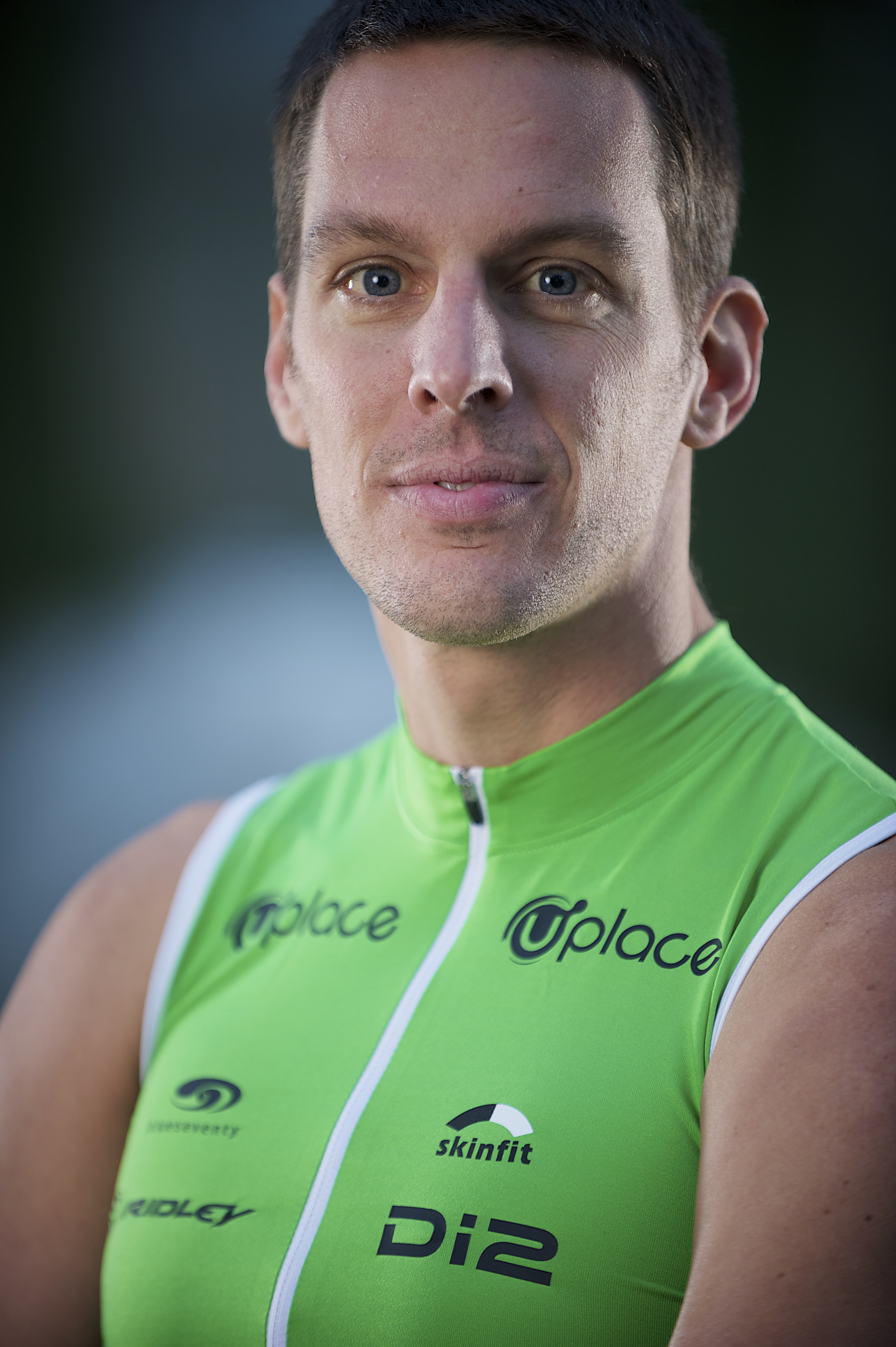
- Axel Zeebroek in 2011

Personal information
- Born: 25 July 1978 (age 47)
- Height: 1.83 m (6 ft 0 in)
- Weight: 72 kg (159 lb)

Sport
- Country: Belgium
- Team: Pro Uplace Triathlon Team
- Turned pro: 2002
- Coached by: Bart Decru

Axel Zeebroek (born 25 July 1978) is a triathlete from Belgium. He has won two triathlon race in his career, including the 2009 Ironman 70.3 Monaco. He is a member of the Pro Uplace Triathlon Team, coached by Bart Decru.

Born in Dinant, Zeebroek started out as a swimmer at the very young age. He had won several Belgian league titles for the 400 m freestyle and individual medley, and the 1500 m freestyle. At age 17, Zeebroek advised his coach and his personal doctor to begin with triathlon. Zeebroek made his international debut in triathlon when he won the Belgian Junior Triathlon Championships in 1998, and finished sixth at the European Junior Championships in Velden on the same year. In 2002, Zeebroek became a professional triathlete.

During his career, Zeebroek took part in 65 ITU and ETU competitions, and achieved eight Top 10 positions. His best result was in the 2003 ITU Triathlon World Cup in Athens, where he finished fifth at a duration of 1:54:46. He qualified for the 2008 Summer Olympics in Beijing, along with his teammate Peter Croes, after finishing eighth at the European Triathlon Championships in Lisbon. Zeebroek placed thirteenth in the men's triathlon at the time of 1:50:30.90, a few minutes behind Germany's Jan Frodeno, who won the event.

After the Olympics, Zeebroek won the 2009 Ironman 70.3 Monaco, and in the following year, he added three of his best placements in a long-distance triathlon, including a second-place finish at the 2011 Ironman 70.3 Antwerp.
