= Peter Croes =

Belgian triathlete

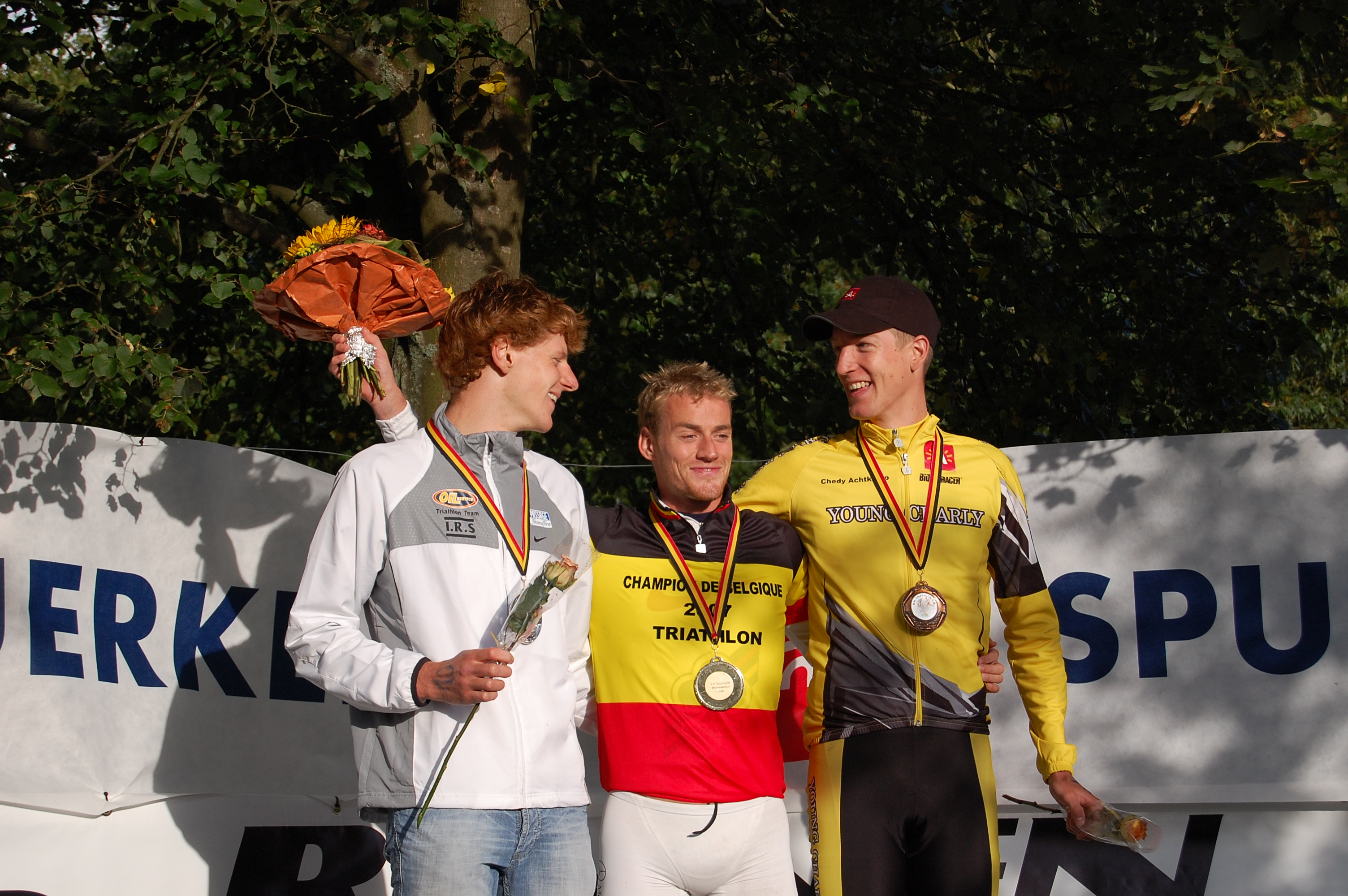
- Peter Croes (middle)

Personal information
- Nationality: Belgium
- Born: March 16, 1984 (age 42) Bonheiden, Belgium
- Height: 1.72 m (5 ft 7 1/2 in)
- Weight: 61 kg (134 lb)

Peter Croes (born March 16, 1984) is a triathlete from Belgium, specialized in the Olympic distance. He is a double titleholder at the European Junior Triathlon Championships, and is also currently ranked no. 73 in the world by the International Triathlon Union.

Born in Bonheiden, Croes started out his sporting career as a football player in his early childhood, until he discovered triathlon at age twelve in a local school. From then on, he began competing in various local and national triathlon championships at the peak of his career. His first major success happened when he came third at the 2001 European Junior Triathlon Championships in Karlovy Vary, Czech Republic, followed by his winning triumphs at the same event twice, in 2002 and in 2003. Because of his repeated successes in the championships, Croes eventually made his international debut in triathlon for the ITU World Cup in Madrid, where he finished fifth.

Croes was also selected for the national team, together with his teammate Axel Zeebroek, at the 2008 Summer Olympics in Beijing. According to the International Triathlon Union, he was ranked no. 52 on the list of Olympic qualifiers, which guaranteed him a place for the Olympics, because of his fifth-place finish at the ITU World Cup in New Plymouth, New Zealand. In the men's triathlon, he finished only in twenty-seventh place with a time of 1:51:40.

== Results ==
=== Triathlon ===
- 2001: (bronze) EC Juniors in Karlsbad
- 2002: (gold) EC Juniors in Győr
- 2003: (gold) EC Juniors in Karlovy Vary
- 2003: 5th WC Juniors in Queenstown
- 2004: 5th ITU World Cup in Madrid
- 2005: 17th WC Olympic distance in Gamagori - 1:51.16
- 2006: (bronze) European Cup in San Remo
- 2006: 6th ITU World Cup in Corner Brook
- 2006: 19th EC Olympic distance in Autun - 2:00.52
- 2006: 63rd WC Olympic distance in Lausanne - 2:02.02
- 2007: 31st EC Olympic distance in Copenhagen - 1:54.41
- 2008: 5th ITU World Cup in New Plymouth
- 2008: 16th EC Olympic distance in Lisbon - 1:55.45
- 2008: 27th Olympic Games in Beijing - 1:51.40.94
- 2009: 12th EC Olympic distance in Holten - 1:45.35
- 2009: 19th ITU World Cup in Madrid - 1:54.44
- 2009: 20th ITU World Cup in Washington D.C. - 1:52.27
- 2010: 5th ITU Triathlon World Cup Huatulco - 01:50:22
- 2010: 14th ITU Elite Sprint Triathlon World Championships Lausanne - 0:53:59
- 2010: 6th ITU Triathlon Premium European Cup Brasschaat - 1:45:13
- 2011: 8th ITU Triathlon Pan American Cup Ixtapa - 1:57:55
- 2011: 9th Cremona ITU Sprint Triathlon European Cup Cremona - 0:55:54

=== Duathlon ===
- 2003: (gold) WC Juniors in Affoltern
- 2004: 4th WC under-23 in Geel
