= Eligio Cervantes =

Mexican triathlete (born 1974)

Personal information
- Full name: Eligio Cervantes Islas
- Born: December 17, 1974 (age 51) Mexico City, Mexican Federal District, Mexico
Medal record
Men's Triathlon
Representing Mexico
Central American and Caribbean Games
Gold medal – first place	2006 Cartagena	Individual Race
Silver medal – second place	2002 San Salvador	Individual Race

Eligio Cervantes Islas (born December 17, 1974, in Mexico City, Mexican Federal District) is an athlete from Mexico, who competes in triathlon. Cervantes competed at the second Olympic triathlon at the 2004 Summer Olympics. He placed thirty-eighth with a total time of 1:59:27.81.
