= Duarte Marques (triathlete) =

Portuguese triathlete

Personal information
- Full name: Duarte da Silva Marques
- Born: 3 December 1983 (age 42) Rio Maior, Portugal
- Height: 1.72 m (5 ft 7 1/2 in)
- Weight: 61 kg (134 lb)

Sport
- Country: Portugal

Duarte da Silva Marques (born December 3, 1983, in Rio Maior) is a triathlete from Portugal. He competed at the 2008 Summer Olympics in Beijing, where he placed forty-fifth in the men's triathlon, with a time of 1:55:06.

At the peak of his career, Marques has achieved 14 top ten finishes in over fifty competitions, including his championship triumph at the 2007 ITU European Cup in Split, Croatia.
