= Nancy Álvarez (triathlete) =

Argentine triathlete (born 1976)

Personal information
- Born: June 3, 1976 (age 50) Buenos Aires, Argentina

Sport
- Sport: Triathlon
Medal record
Women's triathlon
Representing Argentina
South American Games
Silver medal – second place	2002 Rio de Janeiro	Individual

Nancy Judith Álvarez (born June 3, 1976) is an Argentine triathlete who represented her country in the second Olympic triathlon at the 2004 Summer Olympics.

Born in Buenos Aires, Nancy Álvarez is a native of the Buenos Aires Province town of San Justo, the capital of La Matanza Partido. She studied public accountancy at the National University of La Matanza and has been competing in the triathlon since 1996. She became Argentina's national champion in the sport three times—in 2001, 2003 and 2004, winning at the games held in La Paz. Her final standing in the 2004 Olympic competition, however, was forty-third, with a total time of 2:21:38.66.
