= Brent McMahon =

Canadian triathlete (born 1980)

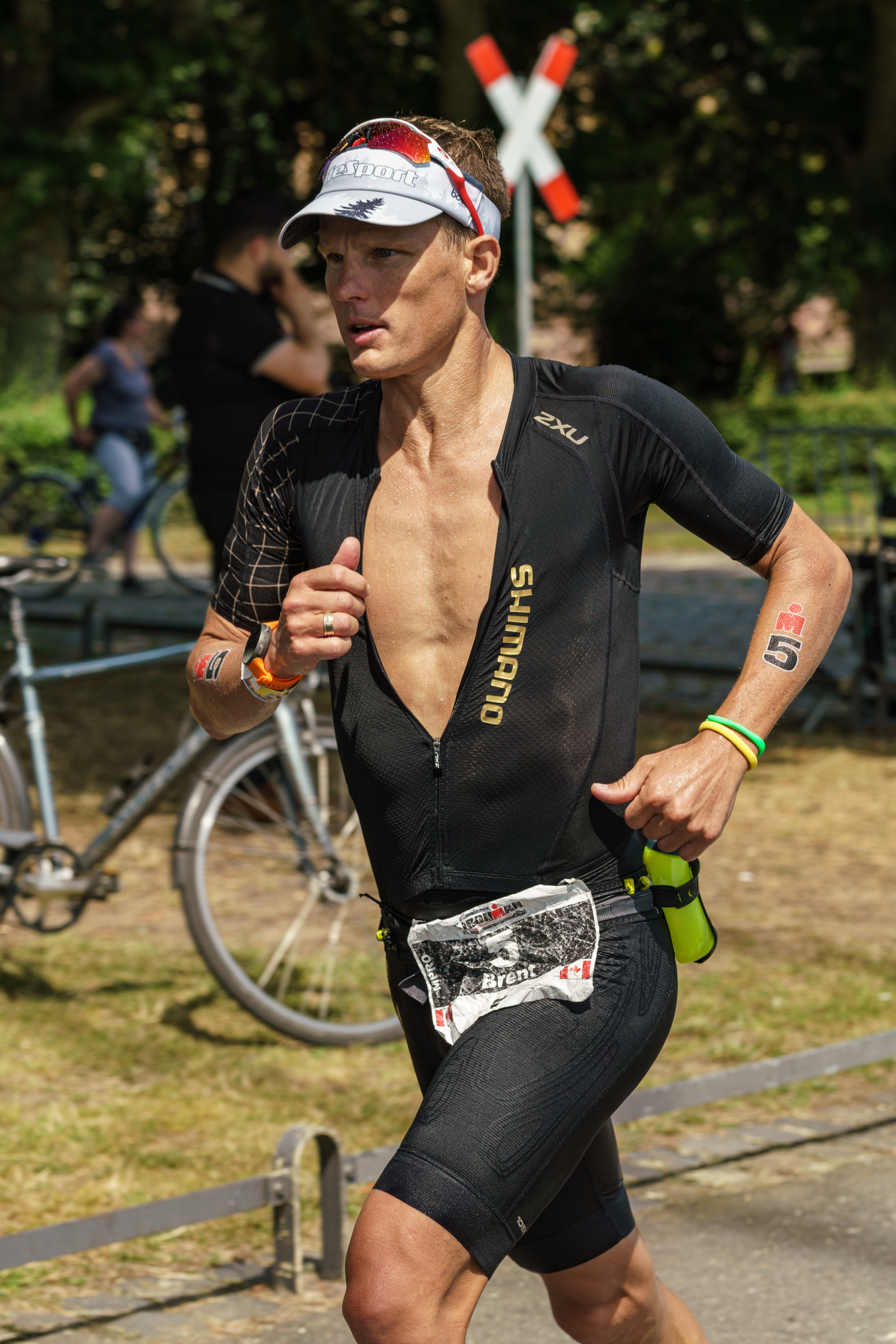

Personal information
- Born: September 17, 1980 (age 45) Kelowna, British Columbia
- Height: 5 ft 9 in (1.75 m)
- Weight: 155 lb (70 kg; 11 st)
- Spouse: Carolyn Cooper

Sport
- Country: Canada
Medal record
Representing Canada
Pan American Games
| Silver medal – second place | 2007 Rio de Janeiro | Men's |
| Bronze medal – third place | 2011 Guadalajara | Men's |

Brent McMahon (born September 17, 1980 in Kelowna, British Columbia) is a triathlete from Canada.

McMahon competed in the second Olympic triathlon at the 2004 Summer Olympics. He was hampered by injuries, and placed thirty-ninth with a total time of 1:59:44.57.

At the 2007 Pan American Games, McMahon won the silver medal, after being narrowly beaten by American Andy Potts.

On August 14, 2011, Brent won his first Triathlon World Cup event in Tiszaújváros, Hungary.

At the 2012 Summer Olympics, he finished in 27th place.

McMahon went to Handsworth Secondary School in the District of North Vancouver, British Columbia.

== See also ==
- List of Canadian sports personalities
