= Fiorella D'Croz =

Colombian triathlete and cross-country skier

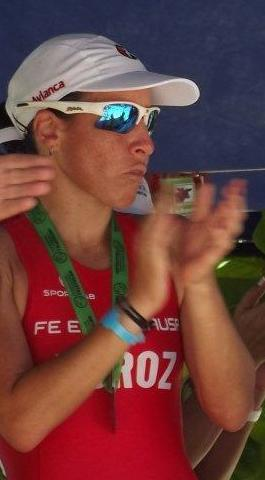
- D'Croz in 2012

Personal information
- Full name: Fiorella D'Croz Brusatin
- Born: 19 April 1979 (age 46) Cali, Colombia

Sport
- Country: Colombia
- Sport: Triathlon, cross-country skiing

Fiorella D'Croz Brusatin (born 19 April 1979 in Cali) is an athlete from Colombia, who competes in triathlon and cross-country skiing. Brusatin competed at the second Olympic triathlon at the 2004 Summer Olympics. She took forty-second place with a total time of 2:21:03.46.
