= Felipe Van de Wyngard =

Chilean triathlete (born 1981)

Personal information
- Born: 11 May 1981 (age 44) Santiago, Chile

Sport
- Sport: Triathlon

Felipe Van de Wyngard (born 11 May 1981) is a Chilean triathlete of Dutch descent. At the 2012 Summer Olympics men's triathlon, he placed 50th.
