= Camilo González =

Camilo González Posso
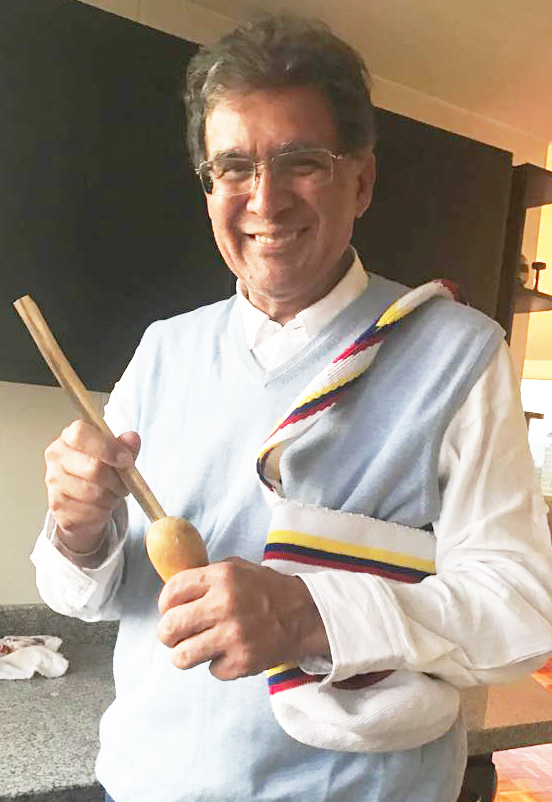

Colombian Minister of Health
- In office October 26, 1990 – July 12, 1992
- President: César Gaviria Trujillo
- Preceded by: Antonio Navarro Wolff
- Succeeded by: Gustavo de Roux

Personal details
- Born: June 27, 1947 (age 78) Popayán, Cauca, Colombia
- Party: Independent Democratic Pole
- Other political affiliations: 19th of April Movement
- Profession: Chemical Engineer

Camilo González Posso (born 1947) is a Colombian chemical engineer, historian, economist and political activist. He began his career as a teacher at different universities in Cali and Bogotá, Colombia, including the National University of Colombia, remaining at the academy for more than 20 years.

Gonzalez is the author of several books on political theory and Colombian economy, including Colombian History - 20th Century, Popular Participative Planning, Social Security Reforms: Health, Pensions and Professional Risks Politics, The End of Neo-liberalism: Neo-structuralism and Alternative Developmentand Constitution and Democracy, among others.

Gonzalez is the promoter, founder and president of several Colombian political parties such as the 1968 Socialist Block, the 1975 Socialist Party of the Workers, the 1989 Democratic Alliance M-19. He also co-founded the Independent Democratic Pole (Polo Democratico Independiente) in 2002.

He has collaborated on several peace processes both within and outside Colombia. Between 1975 and 1981 he participated with the International Fourth, collaborating with revolutionary movements in Nicaragua, Peru, Brazil, France and Poland. From 1984 he took part in peace negotiations involving the guerrilla organizations in Colombia, working as Carlos Pizarro's successor to negotiate demobilization of the M19 guerrillas. He served as negotiator for the accord of the Constitutional Assembly of 1991. He was also one of the coordinators of the Mandate for Peace, which received 10 million votes in 1997 and called for a peace initiative seeking social justice and an end to civil war in Colombia.

Gonzalez was elected Minister of State for Health under Cesar Gaviria's government. Currently he is the president of INDEPAZ, the Institute for Peace and Development ("Instituto de estudios para el desarrollo y la paz").
