= Javier Rosas =

Mexican triathlete (born 1974)

Personal information
- Born: September 25, 1974 (age 51) Santa Catarina
Medal record
Men's Triathlon
Representing Mexico
Central American and Caribbean Games
Gold medal – first place	2002 San Salvador	Individual Race

Javier Rosas Sierra (born September 25, 1974, in Guadalajara) is a male athlete from Mexico. He competes in the triathlon.

Rosas competed at the second Olympic triathlon at the 2004 Summer Olympics. He placed forty-fourth with a total time of 2:04:03.97.
