= Emilio D'Aquino =

Italian triathlete

Personal information
- Born: 26 March 1982 (age 44) Novara, Italy
- Height: 1.85 m (6 ft 1 in)
- Weight: 69 kg (152 lb)

Sport
- Country: Italy
- Team: CS Carabinieri

Emilio D'Aquino (born 26 March 1982) is a triathlete from Italy, who competed at the 2008 Summer Olympics in Beijing. He is also the runner-up in junior championships for both duathlon and triathlon.

== Sporting career ==
D'Aquino started out his sporting career in 1997, and has won national championship titles for all youth categories. He made his international debut in 2001, when he took silver medals at the ITU World Junior Triathlon Championships in Edmonton, Alberta, Canada, and at the ITU World Junior Duathlon Championships in Rimini. As a member of CS Carabinieri, D'Aquino repeated his success in triathlon by winning ten Italian titles, including four in the Olympic distance. He was also selected for the Italian team in triathlon, and guaranteed his qualifying berth for the 2008 Summer Olympics in Beijing, along with his teammate Daniel Fontana, a former competitor from Argentina at the previous games in Athens. D'Aquino finished only in fortieth place with a time of 1:53:58.

D'Aquino continued to participate in European and World championships at the peak of his career, despite fulfilling his economics degree. In December 2010, he decided to retire from triathlon to focus on his professional business career in the financial sector.
