= María Morales (triathlete) =

Colombian triathlete (born 1966)

Personal information
- Born: July 21, 1966 (age 60) Itagüí, Antioquia Colombia

Sport
- Sport: Triathlon
Medal record
Representing Colombia
Central American and Caribbean Games
Gold medal – first place	1998 Maracaibo	Team
Silver medal – second place	2002 San Salvador	Team
Silver medal – second place	2010 Mayaguez	Team
Bronze medal – third place	2002 San Salvador	Individual

María Carmenza Morales Rendón (born July 21, 1966) is an athlete from Colombia, who competes in triathlon. Morales competed at the first Olympic triathlon at the 2000 Summer Olympics. She took thirty-seventh place with a total time of 2:13:43.38.
