= Carla Moreno =

Brazilian triathlete (born 1976)

Personal information
- Born: September 19, 1976 (age 50) São Carlos, Brazil

Sport
- Sport: Triathlon
Medal record
Women's Triathlon
Representing Brazil
Pan American Games
| Silver medal – second place | 1999 Winnipeg | Individual |

Carla Priscile Moreno (born September 19, 1976) is Brazilian athlete who competes in triathlons. She won the silver medal at the 1999 Pan American Games, won the International Triathlon Union Mazatlan World Cup in 2004 and competed in the 2000 and 2004 Olympic Games.

== Career ==
Moreno began her career in 1996. She won the silver medal at the 1999 Pan American Games in Winnipeg, Manitoba, Canada. Before travelling to the Pan American Games, she had her bicycle stolen, but managed to recover it before the start of the games.

Moreno won the International Triathlon Union Mazatlan World Cup in 2004.

Moreno competed at the first Olympic triathlon at the 2000 Summer Olympics. She was one of two Brazilian athletes, along with Mariana Ohata, not to finish the competition. At the 2004 Summer Olympics, Moreno again competed in the triathlon. Again, she did not finish, making her the only athlete to start in both of the first two Olympic triathlons but finish neither.

In November 2006, Moreno qualified for the Pan American Games in Rio de Janeiro, finishing in ninth place. Four years later, she qualified for her fourth edition of the Pan American Games, but an injury prevented her from competing.
