= Juraci Moreira =

Brazilian triathlete (born 1979)

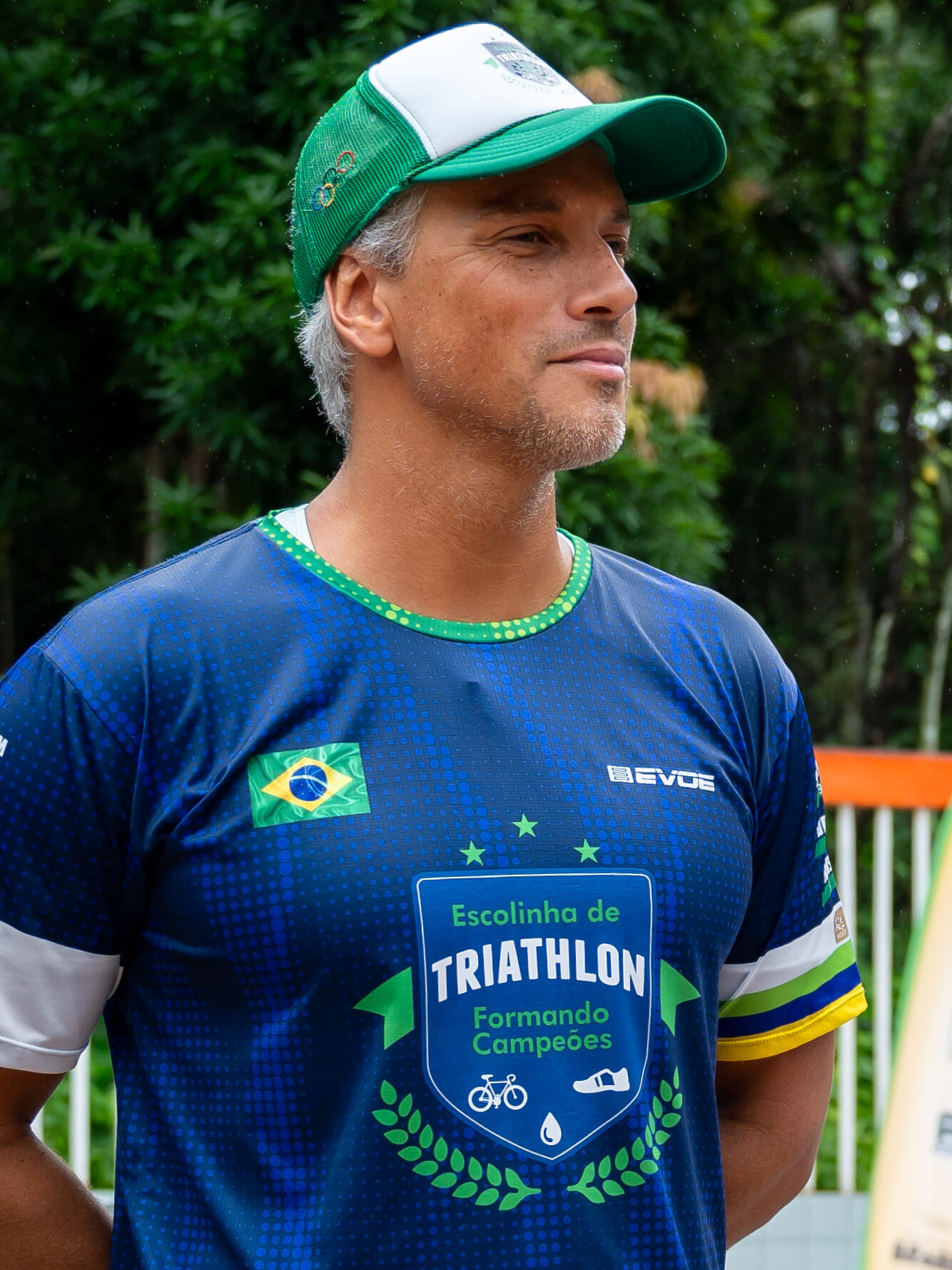
- 2024 Juraci Moreira

Personal information
- Born: May 2, 1979 (age 47)
Medal record
Men's Triathlon
Representing Brazil
South American Games
Silver medal – second place	2002 Rio de Janeiro	Individual

Juraci Moreira (born May 2, 1979 in Curitiba) is a triathlete from Brazil.

Moreira competed at the first Olympic triathlon at the 2000 Summer Olympics. He took 22nd place with a total time of 1:50:44.79. Four years later, at the 2004 Summer Olympics, Moreira competed again. He fell to 41st in the ranking with a time of 2:02:35.99. He returned to triathlon at the 2008 Summer Olympics where he finished 26th with a time of 1:51:35.57.
