= Sandra Soldan =

Brazilian triathlete (born 1973)

Personal information
- Born: December 27, 1973 (age 52) Niterói, Rio de Janeiro, Brazil
- Education: Federal University of Rio de Janeiro
- Years active: 1995–present
- Height: 165 cm (65 in)
- Weight: 55 kg (121 lb)
- Spouse: Carlos Eugênio Ferraro
- Other interests: reading, travelling

Sport
- Sport: Triathlon
- Club: Club de Regatas Vasco da Gama
- Coached by: Carlos Eugênio Ferraro
Medal record
Women's Triathlon
Representing Brazil
South American Games
Gold medal – first place	2002 Rio de Janeiro	Individual

Sandra Soldan (born December 27, 1973, in Niterói) is an athlete from Brazil, who competes in triathlon.

Soldan competed at the first Olympic triathlon at the 2000 Summer Olympics. She took eleventh place with a total time of 2:03:19.86. Four years later, Soldan competed at the 2004 Summer Olympics. This time, she did not finish the competition.
