= Gilberto González (triathlete) =

Venezuelan triathlete (born 1970)

Personal information
- Born: December 15, 1970 (age 55) Caracas, Venezuela
Medal record
Men's Triathlon
Representing Venezuela
Pan American Games
Gold medal – first place	1999 Winnipeg	Individual Race
Central American and Caribbean Games
Bronze medal – third place	2002 San Salvador	Individual Race

Gilberto Carlos González Parra (born December 15, 1970, in Caracas, Distrito Capital) is a triathlete from Venezuela.

== Career ==
González competed at the first Olympic triathlon at the 2000 Summer Olympics. He took thirty-seventh place with a total time of 1:52:13.03. Four years later, at the 2004 Summer Olympics, González again competed. He placed thirty-sixth with a time of 1:59:12.20. González won the gold medal at the 1999 Pan American Games in Winnipeg (Canada) in 1999.

He has taught mathematics in the University of the Andes (ULA) since 1996, and has an Msc degree in applied mathematics from ULA. He has a doctorate in applied mathematics from the Polytechnic University of Valencia (UPV).

== Career achievements ==
=== Major results ===
1995
35th Elite Overall 1995 Cancun ITU Triathlon World Championships

1997
20th Elite Overall 1997 Stockholm ITU Triathlon World Cup
6th Elite Overall 1997 Tiszaujvaros ITU Triathlon World Cup
7th Elite Overall 1997 Perth ITU Triathlon World Championships

1998
1st Elite Overall 1998 Cancun ITU Triathlon World Cup
1st Elite Overall 1998 Noosa ITU Triathlon World Cup
10th Elite Overall 1998 Gamagori ITU Triathlon World Cup
15th Elite Overall 1998 Ishigaki ITU Triathlon World Cup
17th Elite Overall 1998 Auckland ITU Triathlon World Cup

1999
Gold medalist at 1999 Winnipeg Pan American Games.
5th Elite Overall 1999 Noosa ITU Triathlon World Cup
6th Elite Overall 1999 Corner Brook ITU Triathlon World Cup
8th Elite Overall 1999 Cancun ITU Triathlon World Cup
3rd Elite Overall 1999 Margarita Island PATCO Triathlon South American Championships
15th Elite Overall 1999 Lausanne ITU Triathlon World Cup

2000
2nd Elite Overall 2000 Toronto ITU Triathlon World Cup
3rd Elite Overall 2000 Corner Brook ITU Triathlon World Cup
12th Elite Overall 2000 Rio de Janeiro ITU Triathlon World Cup
37th 2000 Sydney Olympic Games

2001
1st Elite Overall 2001 Bogota ITU Triathlon Pan American Cup
1st Elite Overall 2001 Guatemala ITU Triathlon Pan American Cup
12th Elite Overall 2001 St. Petersburg ITU Triathlon World Cup
27th 2001 Toronto ITU Triathlon World Cup

2001
1st Elite Overall 2001 Bogota ITU Triathlon Pan American Cup
1st Elite Overall 2001 Guatemala ITU Triathlon Pan American Cup
12th Elite Overall 2001 St. Petersburg ITU Triathlon World Cup
17th Elite Overall 2001 Cancun ITU Triathlon World Cup
27th Elite Overall 2001 Toronto ITU Triathlon World Cup

2002
2nd Elite Overall 2002 La Paz ITU Triathlon Pan American Cup
2nd Elite Overall 2002 Rincon ITU Triathlon Pan American Cup
4th Elite Overall 2002 Boston ITU Triathlon Pan American Cup
14th Elite Overall 2002 St. Petersburg ITU Triathlon World Cup
20th Elite Overall 2002 Makuhari ITU Triathlon World Cup

2003
1st Elite Overall 2003 Bogota ITU Triathlon Pan American Cup
2nd Elite 2003 Margarita Island PATCO Triathlon South American Championships
3rd Elite Overall 2003 Amatique ITU Triathlon Pan American Cup
12th Elite Overall 2003 Santo Domingo Pan American Games
20th Elite Overall 2003 Corner Brook ITU Triathlon World Cup

2004
1st Elite Overall 2004 Rincon ITU Triathlon Pan American Cup
3rd Elite 2004 Valle de Bravo ITU Triathlon Pan American Cup
15th Elite Overall 2004 Corner Brook ITU Triathlon World Cup
36th Elite Overall 2004 Athens Olympic Games
40th Elite Overall 2004 Mazatlan ITU Triathlon World Cup

2005
1st Elite Overall 2005 Panama ITU Triathlon Pan American Cup
4th Elite Overall 2005 Bogota PATCO Triathlon Pan American Championships
7th Elite Overall 2005 Rincon ITU Triathlon Pan American Cup

2006
1st Elite Overall 2006 Bogota ITU Triathlon Pan American Cup
2nd Elite Overall 2006 Lecheria ITU Triathlon Pan American Cup
45th Elite Overall 2006 Lausanne ITU Triathlon World Championships

2007
24th Elite Overall 2007 Rio de Janeiro Pan American Games

2011
43rd Elite Overall 2011 Guatape ITU Triathlon World Cup
