= Mariana Ohata =

Brazilian triathlete

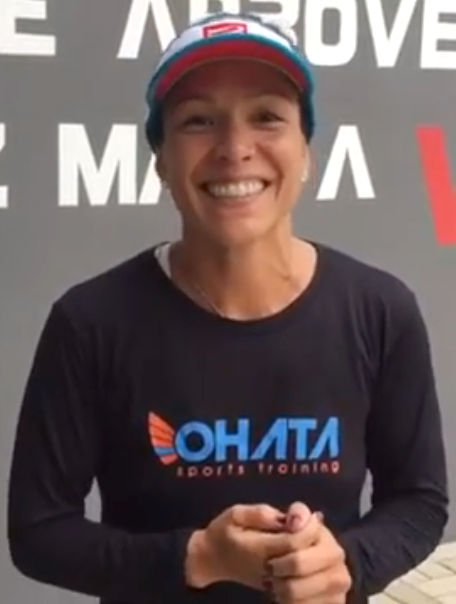
- In a 2016 video
- Born: October 26, 1978 (age 47)
- Occupation: Athlete

Mariana Ohata (born October 26, 1978) is an athlete from Brazil, who competes in triathlon.

A former member of the Brazilian National Swim Team, Ohata competed in the first Olympic triathlon at the 2000 Summer Olympics. She was one of two Brazilian athletes, and Carla Moreno, who did not finish the competition.

She competed again at the 2004 Summer Olympics four years later. This time, she finished with a time of 2:16:52.97 in thirty-seventh place.

== Doping bans ==
In 2002, Ohata was banned from competition for 60 weeks by the Brazilian Triathlon Confederation. In June 2009, Ohata tested positive for furosemide, a result confirmed by the "B" sample. In October 2009, Ohata was banned from competition for six years, the minimum penalty for a second doping offence under ITU rules. As a result of the ban, she was unable to compete in her "home" Olympics in Rio de Janeiro.
