= Ricardo Cardeño =

Colombian triathlete (born 1971)

Personal information
- Born: January 8, 1971 (age 55) Medellín, Colombia

Sport
- Sport: Triathlon

Ricardo José Cardeño Restrepo (born January 8, 1971) is a triathlete from Colombia who won the 2005 Pan American Triathlon Championships, and who has represented his native country three times at the Pan American Games: 1995, 1999 and 2007. Cardeno has competed at the international level since 1991. He won the 2002 and 2007 Pan American Duathlon Championships in Colombia.
