= Paul Tichelaar =

Canadian triathlete

Personal information
- Born: November 13, 1982 (age 42); Edmonton, Alberta, Canada

Sport
- Sport: Triathlon

Paul ("Tish") Tichelaar (born November 13, 1982) was a member of the 2006 Canadian National Triathlon team for Olympic distance triathlon. He has competed in events such as the 2006 Commonwealth Games, the 2005 and 2006 World Triathlon Championships and many ITU World Cup races. In 2006 he won the U-23 national Championship race in Kelowna, British Columbia, and the Pan American Cup race in Caledon, Ontario. He completed his degree in electrical engineering from the University of Alberta in 2005.

In June 2008, Tichelaar was named to the 2008 Summer Olympics team.
