= List of flag bearers for Grenada at the Olympics =

Grenada at the Olympics
- IOC code: GRN
- NOC: Grenada Olympic Committee
- Website: www.grenadaolympic.com
- Medals: Gold 1 Silver 1 Bronze 3 Total 5

Summer appearances
- 1984; 1988; 1992; 1996; 2000; 2004; 2008; 2012; 2016; 2020; 2024

This is a list of flag bearers who have represented Grenada at the Olympics.

Flag bearers carry the national flag of their country at the opening ceremony of the Olympic Games.

#	Event year	Season	Flag bearer	Sport
1	1984	Summer	Bernard Wilson	Boxing
2	1988	Summer	unknown	
3	1992	Summer	Eugene Licorish	Athletics
4	1996	Summer	Jason Charter	Athletics
5	2000	Summer	Hazel-Ann Regis	Athletics
6	2004	Summer	Alleyne Francique	Athletics
7	2008	Summer	Alleyne Francique	Athletics
8	2012	Summer	Kirani James	Athletics
9	2016	Summer	Kirani James	Athletics
10	2020	Summer	Delron Felix	Swimming
10	2020	Summer	Kimberly Ince	Swimming
11	2024	Summer	Tilly Collymore	Swimming
11	2024	Summer	Lindon Victor	Athletics

== See also ==
- Grenada at the Olympics
