= Grenada at the 2012 Summer Olympics =

- IOC code: GRN
- NOC: Grenada Olympic Committee
- Website: www.grenadaolympic.com

in London
- Competitors: 10 in 3 sports
- Flag bearers: Kirani James (opening); Neisha Bernard-Thomas (closing)
- Medals Ranked 50th: Gold 1 Silver 0 Bronze 0 Total 1

Summer Olympics appearances (overview)
- 1984; 1988; 1992; 1996; 2000; 2004; 2008; 2012; 2016; 2020; 2024

Grenada competed at the 2012 Summer Olympics in London, United Kingdom from 27 July to 12 August 2012. This was the nation's eighth consecutive appearance at the Olympics. Few weeks before the Games, Grenadian athletes trained at Broadbridge Heath Leisure Centre near Horsham, West Sussex.

Grenada Olympic Committee sent the nation's largest delegation to the Games, with a total of 10 athletes (6 men and 4 women), competing in 4 different sports. Taekwondo jin Andrea St. Bernard, who competed for the nation's Olympic debut in her sport, was the oldest athlete of the team, at age 32. Track runner and world junior champion Kirani James, the youngest athlete at age 19, was Grenada's flag bearer at the opening ceremony, and subsequently, became the nation's first Olympic medalist when he took the gold medal in the Men's 400 metres.

== Medalists ==
Medal	Name	Sport	Event	Date
Gold	Kirani James	Athletics	Men's 400 metres	6 August

== Athletics ==
Athletes from Grenada have so far achieved qualifying standards in the following athletics events (up to a maximum of 3 athletes in each event at the 'A' Standard, and 1 at the 'B' Standard):

=== Men's 100 m ===
Paul Williams was the only Grenadan participant in the 2012 Olympic Men's 100m sprint event. He participated in the fifth heat of the 4 August qualification match against seven other competitors, including Jamaican finalist Asafa Powell. Williams ran his event in 10.65 seconds, ranking seventh place. He completed the event 0.61 seconds slower than Jamaican runner Asafa Powell, who ranked first in the heat. Overall, Williams ranked 54th out of the 65 athletes who ranked in the qualification round. Ryan Bailey of the United States of America, who ranked first in the qualification round, was 0.77 seconds faster than Williams, who did not advance to further rounds.

=== Men's 400 m ===
Grenada sent two athletes, Rondell Bartholomew and Kirani James, as part of their delegation to represent it in the Men's 400m sprint. James won the country's first Olympic gold in a personal best of 43.94 seconds. He becomes the eighth fastest man in history over one lap and sets a new national record. Bartholomew did pull out of the race, so he didn't progress to do the heat.

=== Women's 200 m ===
Grenada sent Janelle Redhead, as part of their delegation to represent it in the Women's 200m sprint. Redhead participated in the second heat during the 6 August qualification round, ranking third of nine athletes. Redhead earned a time of 23.08 seconds. Overall, Redhead ranked 22nd of 57 athletes. She did progress to the quarterfinals.

=== Women's 400 m ===
Kanika Beckles was the only Grenadan participant in the 2012 Olympic women's 400m sprint event. Beckles did not start the race, so she didn't progress to do the heat

=== Records ===
Men
Track & road events

Athlete	Event	Heat		Quarterfinal		Semifinal		Final	
Athlete	Event	Result	Rank	Result	Rank	Result	Rank	Result	Rank
Rondell Bartholomew	400 m	DNS		—		Did not advance			
Kirani James	400 m	45.23	1 Q	—		44.59	1 Q	43.94	1st place, gold medalist(s)
Joel Redhead	200 m	21.22	8	—		Did not advance			
Paul Williams	100 m	Bye		10.65	7	Did not advance			

Combined events – Decathlon

Athlete	Event	100 m	LJ	SP	HJ	400 m	110H	DT	PV	JT	1500 m	Final	Rank
Kurt Felix	Result	11.12	7.63	13.28	2.05	50.17	DNS	—	—	—	—	DNF	
Kurt Felix	Points	834	967	684	850	807	0	—	—	—	—	DNF	

Women
Track & road events

Athlete	Event	Heat		Semifinal		Final	
Athlete	Event	Result	Rank	Result	Rank	Result	Rank
Kanika Beckles	400 m	DNS		Did not advance			
Neisha Bernard-Thomas	800 m	2:03.23	6 q	2:00.68	8	Did not advance	
Janelle Redhead	200 m	23.08	3 Q	23.51	8	Did not advance	

Key

- Note–Ranks given for track events are within the athlete's heat only
- Q = Qualified for the next round
- q = Qualified for the next round as a fastest loser or, in field events, by position without achieving the qualifying target
- NR = National record
- N/A = Round not applicable for the event
- Bye = Athlete not required to compete in round

== Swimming ==
Esau Simpson was the sole Grenadan participant in the 2012 Olympic Men's 100 metre freestyle. He participated in the second heat of the 31 July qualification round. Simpson finished his event in 53.26 seconds, ranking first among the other competitors in his heat. Overall, Simpson was ranked 43rd, of the 49 athletes who swam in the qualification round. As a result, Esau Simpson did not advance to any further rounds of competition.

Men

Athlete	Event	Heat		Semifinal		Final	
Athlete	Event	Time	Rank	Time	Rank	Time	Rank
Esau Simpson	100 m freestyle	53.26	43	Did not advance			

== Taekwondo ==
Grenanda has qualified 1 woman.

Athlete	Event	Round of 16	Quarterfinals	Semifinals	Repechage	Bronze Medal	Final	
Athlete	Event	Opposition Result	Opposition Result	Opposition Result	Opposition Result	Opposition Result	Opposition Result	Rank
Andrea St. Bernard	Women's −67 kg	Tatar (TUR); L 1–5	Did not advance		McPherson (USA); L 2–15	Did not advance		
