= Grenada at the 2020 Summer Olympics =

- Flag of Grenada
- IOC code: GRN
- NOC: Grenada Olympic Committee
- Website: www.grenadaolympic.com

in Tokyo, Japan July 23 – August 8, 2021
- Competitors: 6 in 2 sports
- Flag bearers (opening): Kimberly Ince; Delron Felix
- Flag bearer (closing): Kirani James
- Medals: Gold 0 Silver 0 Bronze 1 Total 1

Summer Olympics appearances (overview)
- 1984; 1988; 1992; 1996; 2000; 2004; 2008; 2012; 2016; 2020; 2024

Grenada competed at the 2020 Summer Olympics in Tokyo, Japan, from 23 July to 8 August 2021. It was the nation's tenth consecutive appearance at the Summer Olympics, since its debut at the 1984 Summer Olympics in Los Angeles. The Grenadian delegation consisted of six athletes competing in two sports. Kirani James won the lone bronze medal for the country at the Games.

== Background ==
The Grenada Olympic Committee was founded in 1982 and recognized by the International Olympic Committee on 25 July 1984 at the IOC session in Los Angeles, enabling Grenada to make its Olympic debut at the 1984 Summer Olympics. Grenada has competed at every subsequent Summer Olympics. 2020 Summer Olympics was the nation's tenth consecutive appearance at the Summer Olympics.

The 2020 Summer Olympics was held in Tokyo, Japan, between 23 July and 8 August 2021. Originally scheduled to take place from 24 July to 9 August 2020, the Games were postponed due to the COVID-19 pandemic. For the first time, the International Olympic Committee invited each National Olympic Committee to select one female and one male athlete to jointly carry their flag during the opening ceremony. Swimmers Kimberly Ince and Delron Felix jointly served as Grenada's flag-bearers at the opening ceremony. Kirani James, who won a bronze medal, carried the flag at the closing ceremony.

== Medals ==
Kirani James won the country's lone bronze medal in the Games, in the men's 400 metres event. He had won the nation's first Olympic medal at the 2012 Summer Olympics in London, taking gold in the men's 400 metres, and followed it with silver at the 2016 Summer Olympics in Rio de Janeiro.

| Medal | Name | Sport | Event | Date |
|---|---|---|---|---|
| Bronze | Kirani James | Athletics | Men's 400 metres | August 5 |

== Competitors ==
The Grenadian delegation consisted of four track and field athletes — Kirani James, Meleni Rodney, Anderson Peters, and Lindon Victor — and two swimmers, Kimberly Ince and Delron Felix.

| Sport | Men | Women | Total |
|---|---|---|---|
| Athletics | 3 | 1 | 4 |
| Swimming | 1 | 1 | 2 |
| Total | 4 | 2 | 6 |

== Athletics ==
As per the governing body World Athletics (WA), a NOC was allowed to enter up to three qualified athletes in each individual event if the Olympic Qualifying Standards (OQS) for the respective events had been met during the qualifying period. The remaining places were allocated based on the World Athletics Rankings which were derived from the average of the best five results for an athlete over the designated qualifying period, weighted by the importance of the meet. Four athletes represented Grenada in the athletics events at the Games.

The athletics events were held at the Japan National Stadium in Tokyo. Kirani James advanced through the heats of the men's 400 metres, and won his semifinal heat with a time of 43.88 seconds. He went on to win a bronze medal in the final with a time of 44.19 seconds, finishing behind gold medallist Steven Gardiner of the Bahamas (43.85) and silver medallist Anthony Zambrano of Colombia (44.08). Competing in his third consecutive Olympics, this was James' third medal at the Summer Olympics, after his gold in the 2012 Summer Olympics and silver in the 2016 Summer Olympics. He has been Grenada's only medal winner at the Summer Olympics till the Games, and the first Olympic multi-medalist from the country. He also became the first man to earn three Olympic medals in the 400 metres.

Lindon Victor, who made his Olympic debut in the 2016 Summer Olympics, completed the men's decathlon with 8,414 points, finishing seventh overall amongst the 23 participants. In the men's javelin throw, Anderson Peters, the reigning 2019 world champion, registered a best throw of 80.42 m in Group B of the qualification and did not advance to the final. Meleni Rodney did not finish the heats of the women's 400 metres after withdrawing from the race with a hamstring injury. This was the first and only participation for her in the Summer Olympics.

Key

- Note–Ranks given for track events are within the athlete's heat only
- Q = Qualified for the next round
- q = Qualified for the next round as a fastest loser or, in field events, by position without achieving the qualifying target
- NR = National record
- N/A = Round not applicable for the event
- Bye = Athlete not required to compete in round

Track & road events

| Athlete | Event | Heat | | Semifinal | | Final | |
| Athlete | Event | Result | Rank | Result | Rank | Result | Rank |
|---|---|---|---|---|---|---|---|
| Kirani James | Men's 400 m | 45.09 | 2 Q | 43.88 | 1 Q | 44.19 | 3rd place, bronze medalist(s) |
| Meleni Rodney | Women's 400 m | DNF | | Did not advance | | | |

Field events

| Athlete | Event | Qualification | | Final | |
| Athlete | Event | Distance | Position | Distance | Position |
|---|---|---|---|---|---|
| Anderson Peters | Men's javelin throw | 80.42 | 15 | Did not advance | |

Combined events – Men's decathlon

| Athlete | Event | 100 m | LJ | SP | HJ | 400 m | 110H | DT | PV | JT | 1500 m | Final | Rank |
|---|---|---|---|---|---|---|---|---|---|---|---|---|---|
| Lindon Victor | Result | 10.67 SB | 7.24 | 15.39 | 2.02 | 49.21 | 14.83 SB | 49.75 | 4.90 | 71.56 | 4:54.32 | 8414 | 7 |
| Lindon Victor | Points | 935 | 871 | 814 | 822 | 851 | 870 | 865 | 880 | 913 | 593 | 8414 | 7 |

== Swimming ==
As per the Fédération internationale de natation (FINA) guidelines, a NOC was permitted to enter a maximum of two qualified athletes in each individual event, who have achieved the Olympic Qualifying Time (OQT). If the quota was not filled, one athlete per event was allowed to enter per NOC, provided they achieved the Olympic Selection Time (OST) in competitions approved by World Aquatics in the period between 1 March 2019 to 27 June 2021. If the overeall quota was not met, FINA allowed NOCs to enter one swimmer per gender under a universality place even if they have not achieved the standard entry times (OQT/OST). Grenada received a universality invitation from FINA to send two top-ranked swimmers (one per gender) in their respective individual events to the Olympics, based on the FINA points as on 28 June 2021.

The swimming events were held at the Tokyo Aquatics Centre. Kimberly Ince competed in the women's 100 m backstroke, making her Olympic debut. Delron Felix competed in the men's 100 m freestyle, also making his Olympic debut. Neither advanced past the heats, were classified as 41st and 58th in their respective events.

| Athlete | Event | Heat | | Semifinal | | Final | |
| Athlete | Event | Time | Rank | Time | Rank | Time | Rank |
|---|---|---|---|---|---|---|---|
| Delron Felix | Men's 100 m freestyle | 52.99 | 58 | Did not advance | | | |
| Kimberly Ince | Women's 100 m backstroke | 1:10.24 | 41 | Did not advance | | | |

== See also ==
- Grenada at the 2016 Summer Olympics
- Grenada at the 2024 Summer Olympics
