= Grenada at the 2000 Summer Olympics =

- IOC code: GRN
- NOC: Grenada Olympic Committee
- Website: www.grenadaolympic.com

in Sydney
- Competitors: 3 (2 men and 1 woman) in 2 sports
- Flag bearer: Hazel-Ann Regis
- Medals: Gold 0 Silver 0 Bronze 0 Total 0

Summer Olympics appearances (overview)
- 1984; 1988; 1992; 1996; 2000; 2004; 2008; 2012; 2016; 2020; 2024

Grenada competed at the 2000 Summer Olympics in Sydney, Australia, which were held from 15 September to 1 October 2000. The country's participation in Sydney marked its fifth appearance at the Summer Olympics since its debut in 1984. The athlete delegation of the nation consisted of three athletes: sprinters Rudy Sylvan and Hazel-Ann Regis, who would be designated as the flag bearer for Grenada, and swimmer Omar Hughes.

Hughes would first compete for the nation, competing in the men's 50 metre freestyle. There, he would place fifth in his heat and would not advance further. Sylvan and Regis would compete in the same day, competing in the heats of the men's 400 metres and women's 400 metres, respectively. Both of them would place seventh in their heats, not advancing further.

== Background ==
The 2000 Summer Olympics were held in Sydney, Australia, from 15 September to 1 October 2000. This edition of the games marked Grenada's fifth appearance at the Summer Olympics since its debut at the 1984 Summer Olympics in Los Angeles, United States. The nation had never won a medal at the Olympic Games up to this point, with its best finish coming from boxers Bernard Wilson and Chris Collins placing equal ninth in their respective divisions. Hazel-Ann Regis was designated as the flag bearer for Grenada at the opening ceremony.

== Athletics ==
The athletics events were held at Stadium Australia. Rudy Sylvan competed in the heats of the men's 400 metres on 22 September against seven other athletes. There, he would place seventh with a time of 48.17 seconds and did not advance further. Regis would compete in the same say, competing in the heats of the women's 400 metres against six other athletes. There, she would place last with a time of 55.11 seconds and did not advance further.

Track and road events
Athlete	Event	Heat		2nd round		Semifinal		Final	
Athlete	Event	Result	Rank	Result	Rank	Result	Rank	Result	Rank
Rudy Sylvan	Men's 400 m	48.17	7	did not advance					
Hazel-Ann Regis	Women's 400 m	55.11	7	did not advance					

== Swimming ==
The swimming events were held at the Sydney International Aquatic Centre. Omar Hughes would compete in the heats of the men's 50 metre freestyle on 21 September against seven other athletes. There, he would place fifth in the heat with a time of 25.05 seconds and did not advance further.

Swimming events
Athlete	Event	Heat		Semifinal		Final	
Athlete	Event	Time	Rank	Time	Rank	Time	Rank
Omar Hughes	Men's 50 m freestyle	25.05	5	Did not advance			
