= List of Grenadian records in swimming =

The Grenadian records in swimming are the fastest ever performances of swimmers from Grenada, which are recognised and ratified by the Grenada Amateur Swimming Association (GASA).

== Long Course (50 m) ==
=== Men ===
Event	Time		Name	Club	Date	Meet	Location	Ref
50 m freestyle	23.87		Esau Simpson	Grenada	23 June 2016	Bahamas National Championships	Nassau, Bahamas	
100 m freestyle	52.91		Delron Felix	Grenada	2 May 2021	UANA Tokyo Qualifier	Clermont, United States	
200 m freestyle	2:00.10		Nicholas Coard	Fort Lauderdale Aquatics	6 August 2011	FL Southern Zone Senior	Orlando, United States	
400 m freestyle	4:22.05		Nicholas Coard	Fort Lauderdale Aquatics	23 June 2011	FG FLA International Invitational	Fort Lauderdale, United States	
800 m freestyle	9:24.13		Nicholas Coard	Fort Lauderdale Aquatics	15 June 2010	FG Invite	Fort Lauderdale, United States	
1500 m freestyle	18:02.01		Nicholas Coard	Grenada	1 April 2009	CARIFTA Championships	Savaneta, Aruba	
50 m backstroke	26.80	tt	Zackary Gresham	Azura Florida Aquatics	1 May 2025	TYR Pro Swim Series	Fort Lauderdale, United States	
100 m backstroke	57.94	h	Zackary Gresham	Grenada	28 July 2026	Commonwealth Games	Glasgow, United Kingdom	
200 m backstroke	2:13.21		Zackary Gresham	Azura Florida Aquatics	13 April 2024	Puerto Rico International Open	Salinas, Puerto Rico	
50 m breaststroke	29.17		Corey Ollivierre	Grenada	30 June 2017	CCCAN	Couva, Trinidad and Tobago	
100 m breaststroke	1:07.28		Corey Ollivierre	Grenada	2 July 2017	CCCAN	Couva, Trinidad and Tobago	
200 m breaststroke	2:28.92		Martin Renwick	Fort Lauderdale Aquatics	18 March 2008	Southern Zone Sectional Championships	United States	
50m butterfly	25.20	h	Zackary Gresham	Grenada	28 July 2026	Commonwealth Games	Glasgow, United Kingdom	
100m butterfly	55.26	tt	Zackary Gresham	Azura Florida Aquatics	2 May 2025	TYR Pro Swim Series	Fort Lauderdale, United States	
200m butterfly	2:15.75		Dajenel Williams	Grenada	25 May 2019	Annual Aquatic Centre International	Christ Church, Barbados	
200m individual medley	2:11.10		Zackary Gresham	Azura Florida Aquatics	19 May 2024	FG POMP Jesse Vassallo Invitational	Pompano Beach, United States	
400m individual medley	5:00.03		Martin Renwick	Grenada	18 July 2008	CISC	Kingston, Jamaica	
4×100m freestyle relay	4:26.93			-	2002			
4×200m freestyle relay								
4×100m medley relay	4:31.91			-	2002			

Legend: # – Record awaiting ratification by GASA; WR – World record; AM – Americas record; e – equalled existing record;
Records not set in finals: h – heat; sf – semifinal; r – relay 1st leg; rh – relay heat 1st leg; b – B final; † – en route to final mark; so – swim-off; tt – time trial

=== Women ===
Event	Time		Name	Club	Date	Meet	Location	Ref
50 m freestyle	26.42	h	Tilly Collymore	Grenada	2 August 2025	World Championships	Singapore, Singapore	
100 m freestyle	57.06	h, so	Tilly Collymore	Millfield	1 February 2026	Euro Meet	Luxembourg, Luxembourg	
200 m freestyle	2:06.23	h	Tilly Collymore	Grenada	25 July 2026	Commonwealth Games	Glasgow, United Kingdom	
400 m freestyle	4:31.03		Tilly Collymore	Grenada	22 April 2025	CARIFTA Championships	Couva, Trinidad and Tobago	
800 m freestyle	9:32.10		Tilly Collymore	Grenada	19 April 2025	CARIFTA Championships	Couva, Trinidad and Tobago	
1500 m freestyle	19:40.63		Tilly Collymore	Grenada	2 June 2022	PanAm Age Group Swimming Championship	Couva, Trinidad and Tobago	
50 m backstroke	31.44		Kimberly Ince	Grenada	23 February 2020	UANA Swimming Cup	Lima, Peru	
100 m backstroke	1:09.22		Kimberly Ince	Grenada	22 February 2020	UANA Swimming Cup	Lima, Peru	
200 m backstroke	2:33.66	h	Sophia Noel	Grenada	31 July 2009	World Championships	Rome, Italy	
50m breaststroke	33.92	h	Oreoluwa Cherebin	Grenada	22 July 2018	CAC Games	Barranquilla, Colombia	
100m breaststroke	1:15.74		Anaika Otway	Grenada	9 April 2023	CARIFTA Championships	Willemstad, Curaçao	
200m breaststroke	2:49.53		Oreoluwa Cherebin	Grenada	29 June 2019	CCCAN	Bridgetown, Barbados	
50 m butterfly	28.44	h	Tilly Collymore	Millfield	17 April 2026	British Championships	London, United Kingdom	
100 m butterfly	1:04.45		Gabrielle Hyson	Unattached	19 June 2025	Bahamian Championships	Nassau, Bahamas	
200 m butterfly	2:30.37		Gabrielle Hyson	Unattached	21 June 2025	Bahamian Championships	Nassau, Bahamas	
200m individual medley	2:32.33		Gabrielle Hyson	Unattached	21 June 2025	Bahamian Championships	Nassau, Bahamas	
400m individual medley	5:20.49	b	Sara Dowden	Grenada	13 August 2025	Junior Pan American Games	Asunción, Paraguay	
4×50m freestyle relay	1:54.88		Tilly Collymore (28.49); Sara Dowden; Gabrielle Hyson; Kimberly Ince	Grenada	19 April 2022	CARIFTA Championships	Bridgetown, Barbados	
4×100m freestyle relay	4:16.00		Tilly Collymore (1:03.29); Kimberly Ince; Sara Dowden; Gabrielle Hyson	Grenada	16 April 2022	CARIFTA Championships	Bridgetown, Barbados	
4×200m freestyle relay	9:29.30		Tilly Collymore; Anaika Otway; Gabrielle Hyson; Sara Dowden	Grenada	8 April 2023	CARIFTA Championships	Willemstad, Curaçao	
4×100m medley relay	4:54.42		Kimberly Ince; Gabrielle Hyson; Sara Dowden; Tilly Collymore	Grenada	17 April 2022	CARIFTA Championships	Bridgetown, Barbados	

Legend: # – Record awaiting ratification by GASA; WR – World record; AM – Americas record; e – equalled existing record;
Records not set in finals: h – heat; sf – semifinal; r – relay 1st leg; rh – relay heat 1st leg; b – B final; † – en route to final mark; so – swim-off; tt – time trial

== Short Course (25 m) ==
=== Men ===
Event	Time		Name	Club	Date	Meet	Location	Ref
50m freestyle	23.41	h	Esau Simpson	Grenada	13 December 2012	World Championships	Istanbul, Turkey	
100m freestyle	51.35	h	Delron Felix	Grenada	15 December 2018	World Championships	Hangzhou, China	
200m freestyle	2:00.42		Delron Felix	Grenada	9 November 2019	OECS Championships	Ratho Mill, Saint Vincent and the Grenadines	
400 m freestyle								
800 m freestyle								
1500 m freestyle								
50m backstroke	26.54		Marco Bagnasco	Edmonton Keyano	15 December 2017	JP Fiset Invitational	Edmonton, Canada	
100m backstroke	58.73		Marco Bagnasco	Edmonton Keyano	9 December 2016	Rapids FastSwim Classic	Richmond, British Columbia, Canada	
200m backstroke	2:11.06		Marco Bagnasco	Edmonton Keyano	12 December 2015	JP Fiset Invitational	Edmonton, Canada	
50m breaststroke	28.48		Corey Ollivierre	Grenada	10 December 2016	Barbadian Championships	Bridgetown, Barbados	
100m breaststroke	1:03.24		Corey Ollivierre	Grenada	11 December 2016	Barbadian Championships	Bridgetown, Barbados	
200m breaststroke	2:24.04	h	Martin Renwick	Grenada	11 April 2008	World Championships	Manchester, Great Britain	
50m butterfly	25.81		Delron Felix	Grenada	10 November 2019	OECS Championships	Ratho Mill, Saint Vincent and the Grenadines	
100m butterfly	58.02		Delron Felix	Grenada	9 November 2019	OECS Championships	Ratho Mill, Saint Vincent and the Grenadines	
200 m butterfly								
100m individual medley	1:00.79	h	Martin Renwick	Grenada	12 April 2008	World Championships	Manchester, Great Britain	
200 m individual medley								
400m individual medley	5:05.56	h	Martin Renwick	Grenada	10 April 2008	World Championships	Manchester, Great Britain	
4×50 m freestyle relay								
4×100 m freestyle relay								
4×200 m freestyle relay								
4×50 m medley relay								
4×100 m medley relay								

Legend: # – Record awaiting ratification by GASA; WR – World record; AM – Americas record; e – equalled existing record;
Records not set in finals: h – heat; sf – semifinal; r – relay 1st leg; rh – relay heat 1st leg; b – B final; † – en route to final mark; so – swim-off; tt – time trial

=== Women ===
Event	Time		Name	Club	Date	Meet	Location	Ref
50 m freestyle	25.39		Tilly Collymore	Millfield School	11 December 2026	Swim England National Winter Championships	Sheffield, Great Britain	
100 m freestyle	55.35		Tilly Collymore	Millfield School	25 October 2025	CWSC+Millfield School International Open	Millfield, Great Britain	
200 m freestyle	2:02.74		Tilly Collymore	Millfield School	27 October 2025	CWSC+Millfield School International Open	Millfield, Great Britain	
400 m freestyle	4:21.91		Tilly Collymore	Millfield School	26 October 2025	CWSC+Millfield School International Open	Millfield, Great Britain	
800 m freestyle								
1500 m freestyle								
50 m backstroke	30.09		Tilly Collymore	Grenada	8 November 2026	OECS Championships	Castries, Saint Lucia	
100 m backstroke	1:05.60		Tilly Collymore	Grenada	6 November 2026	OECS Championships	Castries, Saint Lucia	
200 m backstroke	2:34.72	h	Grenada	9 April 2008	World Championships	Manchester, Great Britain		
50 m breaststroke	34.35	h	Oreoluwa Cherebin	Grenada	10 September 2011	Commonwealth Youth Games	Douglas, Isle of Man	
100 m breaststroke	1:14.98	h	Oreoluwa Cherebin	Grenada	5 December 2014	World Championships	Doha, Qatar	
200 m breaststroke								
50 m butterfly	30.09		Tilly Collymore	Millfield School	25 October 2025	CWSC+Millfield School International Open	Millfield, Great Britain	
100m butterfly	1:01.94		Tilly Collymore	Millfield School	26 October 2025	CWSC+Millfield School International Open	Millfield, Great Britain	
200 m butterfly								
100 m individual medley								
200 m individual medley	2:27.69		Tilly Collymore	Grenada	6 November 2026	OECS Championships	Castries, Saint Lucia	
400 m individual medley								
4×50 m freestyle relay								
4×100 m freestyle relay								
4×200 m freestyle relay								
4×50 m medley relay								
4×100 m medley relay								

Legend: # – Record awaiting ratification by GASA; WR – World record; AM – Americas record; e – equalled existing record;
Records not set in finals: h – heat; sf – semifinal; r – relay 1st leg; rh – relay heat 1st leg; b – B final; † – en route to final mark; so – swim-off; tt – time trial

== Short Course (25 yd) ==
=== Men ===
Event	Time		Name	Club	Date	Meet	Location	Ref
50yd freestyle	20.31		Esau Simpson	Nova Southeastern University	12 March 2014	NCAA Division II Championships	Geneva, United States	
100yd freestyle	45.10		Esau Simpson	Nova Southeastern University	22 February 2014	Sunshine State Conference Championships	Clearwater, United States	
200yd freestyle	1:42.38		Esau Simpson	Nova Southeastern University	7 March 2013	NCAA Division II Championships	Birmingham, United States	
500yd freestyle	4:57.86		Nicholas Coard	Fort Lauderdale Aquatics	26 January 2011	FG SAS January Scotty Invite	Fort Lauderdale, United States	
1000yd freestyle	10:22.73		Nicholas Coard	Fort Lauderdale Aquatics	26 September 2008	FG Open Invite	Fort Lauderdale, United States	
1650yd freestyle	17:26.58		Nicholas Coard	Fort Lauderdale Aquatics	27 February 2009	FG Open Invite	Fort Lauderdale, United States	
50yd backstroke	24.05		Nicholas Coard	Fort Lauderdale Aquatics	17 November 2011	FG Speedo Winter Champs	Fort Lauderdale, United States	
100yd backstroke	51.70		Zackary Gresham	Grenfin Swim Club	5 June 2021	GASA Mini Meet National Competition	St George's, Grenada	
200yd backstroke	2:00.90		Nicholas Coard	Fort Lauderdale Aquatics	26 January 2011	FG SAS January Scotty Invite	Fort Lauderdale, United States	
50yd breaststroke	25.59	†	Corey Ollivierre	Florida Institute of Technology	18 November 2017	Panther Invite	Melbourne, United States	
100yd breaststroke	56.03		Corey Ollivierre	Florida Institute of Technology	24 February 2018	Sunshine State Champs	Clearwater, United States	
200yd breaststroke	2:07.74		Corey Ollivierre	Florida Institute of Technology	18 November 2017	Panther Invite	Melbourne, United States	
50yd butterfly	23.87		Dajenel Williams	-	28 September 2019	Grenfin Invitational Swim Meet	St George's, Grenada	
100yd butterfly	52.05		Dajenel Williams	-	29 September 2019	Grenfin Invitational Swim Meet	St George's, Grenada	
200yd butterfly	1:55.97		Dajenel Williams	-	6 September 2019	Grenfin Invitational Swim Meet	St George's, Grenada	
200yd individual medley	2:02.84		Eli Zerpa	Gator Swim Club	13 March 2021	Florida Senior Championship North	Orlando, United States	
400yd individual medley	4:26.89		Eli Zerpa	Florida Club Swim	7 November 2021	CCS Southern Regionals	Gainesville, United States	

Legend: # – Record awaiting ratification by GASA; WR – World record; AM – Americas record; e – equalled existing record;
Records not set in finals: h – heat; sf – semifinal; r – relay 1st leg; rh – relay heat 1st leg; b – B final; † – en route to final mark; so – swim-off; tt – time trial

=== Women ===
Event	Time		Name	Club	Date	Meet	Location	Ref
50yd freestyle	25.52		Oreoluwa Cherebin	Fairfield University	14 February 2019	Metro Atlantic Athletic Conference Championships	Buffalo, United States	
100yd freestyle	55.01		Kimberly Ince	Grenfin Swim Club	29 September 2019	Grenfin Invitational Swim Meet	St George's, Grenada	
200yd freestyle	2:01.53		Anaika Charles	Grenfin Swim Club	27 September 2019	Grenfin Invitational Swim Meet	St George's, Grenada	
500yd freestyle	5:26.21		Anaika Charles	Grenfin Swim Club	26 September 2019	Grenfin Invitational Swim Meet	St George's, Grenada	
1000yd freestyle	11:30.97		Anaika Charles	Grenfin Swim Club	15 February 2019	GASA National Championships	St George's, Grenada	
1650yd freestyle	-		-	-	-			
50yd backstroke	28.67		Kimberly Ince	Grenfin Swim Club	29 September 2019	Grenfin Invitational Swim Meet	St George's, Grenada	
100yd backstroke	1:02.04		Kimberly Ince	Grenfin Swim Club	22 February 2018	GASA National Championships	St George's, Grenada	
200yd backstroke	2:15.82		Kimberly Ince	Grenfin Swim Club	16 February 2019	GASA National Championships	St George's, Grenada	
50yd breaststroke	30.45	†	Oreoluwa Cherebin	Fairfield University	15 February 2019	Metro Atlantic Athletic Conference Championships	Buffalo, United States	
100yd breaststroke	1:04.96		Oreoluwa Cherebin	Fairfield University	15 February 2019	Metro Atlantic Athletic Conference Championships	Buffalo, United States	
200yd breaststroke	2:23.05		Oreoluwa Cherebin	Fairfield University	16 February 2019	Metro Atlantic Athletic Conference Championships	Buffalo, United States	
50yd butterfly	27.42		Ariann Williams	Grenfin Swim Club	28 September 2019	Grenfin Invitational Swim Meet	St George's, Grenada	
100yd butterfly	58.95		Oreoluwa Cherebin	-	20 March 2016	PA YMCA State Championships	State College, United States	
200yd butterfly	2:17.59		Oreoluwa Cherebin	-	9 January 2016	Grenfin Invitational Swim Meet	College Park, United States	
200yd individual medley	2:16.61		Kimberly Ince	Grenfin Swim Club	29 September 2019	Grenfin Invitational Swim Meet	St George's, Grenada	
400yd individual medley	5:00.51		Gabrielle Hyson	Grenfin Swim Club	16 February 2019	GASA National Championships	St George's, Grenada	

Legend: # – Record awaiting ratification by GASA; WR – World record; AM – Americas record; e – equalled existing record;
Records not set in finals: h – heat; sf – semifinal; r – relay 1st leg; rh – relay heat 1st leg; b – B final; † – en route to final mark; so – swim-off; tt – time trial
