= Grenada at the Olympics =

- IOC code: GRN
- NOC: Grenada Olympic Committee
- Website: www.grenadaolympic.com
- Medals Ranked 105th: Gold 1 Silver 1 Bronze 3 Total 5

Summer appearances
- 1984; 1988; 1992; 1996; 2000; 2004; 2008; 2012; 2016; 2020; 2024

Grenada first competed at the Olympic Games in 1984, and has participated in each Summer Olympic Games since then. Grenada won its first medal in 2012, a gold in athletics. The Grenada Olympic Committee was formed in 1984 and recognized in the same year.

Grenada has not competed in any Winter Olympic Games yet. After 28 years of competing in the Summer Olympic Games, Grenada won its first medal at the London 2012 Olympics, when Kirani James clocked a new national record of 43.94 seconds on 6 August 2012 to win gold in the Men's 400 meters. It was the smallest country in the history to win a Summer Olympic gold medal until Bermuda won one in 2021, and the smallest sovereign state to win one until Dominica won one in 2024.

At the Rio 2016 Olympics James again won another medal in the Men's 400 meters, this time a silver, with a time of 43.76s. At the Tokyo 2020 Olympics James won a bronze in the same event.

== Medal tables ==
=== Medals by Summer Games ===
Games	Athletes	Gold	Silver	Bronze	Total	Rank
1984 Los Angeles	6	0	0	0	0	–
1988 Seoul	6	0	0	0	0	–
1992 Barcelona	4	0	0	0	0	–
1996 Atlanta	5	0	0	0	0	–
2000 Sydney	3	0	0	0	0	–
2004 Athens	5	0	0	0	0	–
2008 Beijing	9	0	0	0	0	–
2012 London	10	1	0	0	1	50
2016 Rio de Janeiro	7	0	1	0	1	69
2020 Tokyo	6	0	0	1	1	86
2024 Paris	6	0	0	2	2	80
2028 Los Angeles	future event					
2032 Brisbane	future event					
Total		1	1	3	5	105

=== Medals by sport ===
Sport	Gold	Silver	Bronze	Total
Athletics	1	1	3	5
Totals (1 entries)	1	1	3	5

== List of medalists ==
Medal	Name	Games	Sport	Event
Gold	Kirani James	2012 London	Athletics	Men's 400 meters
Silver	Kirani James	2016 Rio de Janeiro	Athletics	Men's 400 meters
Bronze	Kirani James	2020 Tokyo	Athletics	Men's 400 meters
Bronze	Lindon Victor	2024 Paris	Athletics	Men's decathlon
Bronze	Anderson Peters	2024 Paris	Athletics	Men's javelin throw

== See also ==
- List of flag bearers for Grenada at the Olympics
- Grenada at the Commonwealth Games
