= Amanda Crawford (sprinter) =

American-born, Grenadian sprinter

Personal information
- Nationality: Grenada
- Born: 15 May 1999 (age 27) Brooklyn, New York, United States

Sport
- Country: Grenada
- Sport: Track and field
- Event: 400m
- College team: St. Augustine's

Achievements and titles
- Personal best(s): 400 m (Indoor): 54.46; 400 m (Outdoor):52.90; 200 m (Indoor): 24.83; 200 m (Outdoor): 24.16
Medal record
Women's athletics
Representing Grenada
CARIFTA Games(U18)
Silver medal – second place	2016 St. George's	400 m
OECS Track and Field Championships
Silver medal – second place	2016 Tortola	4x400m Relay
Bronze medal – third place	2017 St.George's, Grenada	4x100m Relay
Silver medal – second place	2017 St.George's, Grenada	4x400m Relay

Amanda Crawford (born 15 May 1999) is an American-born, Grenadian sprinter who specializes in the 400 metres. In 2016, she represented Grenada at the CARIFTA Games and earned a silver medal in the 400m, in the under-18 girls' category. She was also a part of the women's 4X400m Relay team which secured a silver medal at the 2016 OECS Track & Field Championships with teammates Meleni Rodney, Kenisha Pascal and Kanika Beckles.

She returned to Grenada in 2017 for the OECS athletics championship and was a part of two relay teams which earned a medal. She anchored the 4 x100m Relay team which placed third and ran the third leg for the 4 x 400m women's Relay team which earned a silver medal while still running faster than the previously established games record.

Amanda's 2018 season was highlighted by a second-place finish in the 400m finals at the NCAA Division II Outdoor Track & Field Championships in a personal best time of 52.90 seconds. She was selected to represent Grenada in the 2018 IAAF World U20 Championships at Tampere Stadium in Tampere, Finland. She placed second in the fifth heat of the women's 400m with a time of 54.37 seconds. She then advanced to the semi-finals but was unable to progress to final due to her 6th-place finish in the third semi finals in a time of 54.36 Seconds.

In July 2018 Amanda's school team, Saint Augustine's University, was named the NCAA Division II Women's Scholar Team of the Year for the 2017–18 outdoor track and field season by the U.S. Track & Field and Cross Country Coaches Association (USTFCCCA). On December 13 of the same year it was announced that Saint Augustine's University won two Accusplit Relay Awards for running the fastest NCAA Division II times in the women's 4x200 and 4x400 relays in 2018. Amanda was a participant on both teams.

== Competition record ==
Year	Competition	Venue	Position	Event	Notes
Representing Grenada
2016	CARIFTA Games	St. George's, Grenada	2nd	400 m (U18)	54.16
2016	OECS Track and Field Championships	Tortola, British Virgin Islands	2nd	4x400m Relay	3:41.75
2017	CARIFTA Games	Willemstad, Curacao	7th	400 m (U20)	56.81
2017	OECS Track and Field Championships	Kirani James Athletic Stadium, Grenada	4th	200m	25.05
2017	OECS Track and Field Championships	Kirani James Athletic Stadium, Grenada	3rd	4 x 100m	47.24
2017	OECS Track and Field Championships	Kirani James Athletic Stadium, Grenada	2nd	4 × 400 m Relay	3:37.48
2018	World U20 Championships in Athletics	Tampere, Finland	6th sf	400 m	54.36
