= Meleni Rodney =

Grenadian sprinter

Personal information
- Born: 27 June 1998 (age 28) Grenada

Sport
- College team: UCLA Bruins
Medal record
Athletics
Representing Grenada
Summer Youth Olympics
Bronze medal – third place	2014 Nanjing	400m

Meleni Rodney, OLY (born 27 June 1998) is a Grenadian sprinter who specialises in the 400 metres.

She participated at the Summer Youth Olympics in 2014 and received a bronze medal. In that same year she was named athlete of the year along with Kirani James. In 2016, she was a part of the women's 4×400m Relay team which secured a Silver Medal at the 2016 OECS Track & Field Championships with teammates Amanda Crawford, Kenisha Pascal and Kanika Beckles.

In 2017 Meleni experience a return to form resulting in improvements in her personal best in the 200m at the Norcal finals as well in the 400m dash at the CCCAA California State Championships.

After recording a personal best time in the 400m at the 2019 Rafer Johnson/Jackie Joyner-Kersee Invitational Meleni was named Pac-12 Athlete of the Week

On 26 May 2020 Meleni was one of 12 UCLA Bruins who received USTFCCCA Indoor All-America Accolades as part of the Women's 4x400m Relay team.

== Competition record ==
Year	Competition	Venue	Position	Event	Notes
Representing Grenada
2014	CARIFTA Games	Fort-de-France, Martinique	3rd	400 m (U18)	54.45
2014	Summer Youth Olympics	Nanjing, China	3rd	400 m	53.33
2015	CARIFTA Games	Basseterre, Saint Kitts and Nevis	3rd	400 m (U18)	54.56
2015	World Youth Championships in Athletics	Cali, Colombia	8th (sf)	400 m (U18)	56.36
2015	Commonwealth Youth Games	Apia, Samoa	5th (h)	400 m	59.00
2016	OECS Track and Field Championships	Tortola, British Virgin Islands	6th	400m	57.14
2016	OECS Track and Field Championships	Tortola, British Virgin Islands	2nd	4×400m RELAY	3:41.75
2017	OECS Track and Field Championships	Kirani James Athletic Stadium, Grenada	1st	400m	53.55
2017	OECS Track and Field Championships	Kirani James Athletic Stadium, Grenada	2nd	4 × 400 m RELAY	3:37.48

== Personal bests ==
Outdoor

- 200 metres – 23.25 (De Anza – Cupertino, CA 2017)
- 400 metres – 51.32 (Drake Stadium – Los Angeles, CA 2021)
- 200 (Indoor) metres – 23.92 (Dempsey Indoor, Seattle WA, USA 2018)
- 400 (Indoor) metres – 53.80 (Dempsey Indoor, Seattle WA, USA 2018)
