= Grenada at the 2016 Summer Olympics =

- IOC code: GRN
- NOC: Grenada Olympic Committee
- Website: www.grenadaolympic.com

in Rio de Janeiro
- Competitors: 7 in 2 sports
- Flag bearer: Kirani James
- Medals Ranked 69th: Gold 0 Silver 1 Bronze 0 Total 1

Summer Olympics appearances (overview)
- 1984; 1988; 1992; 1996; 2000; 2004; 2008; 2012; 2016; 2020; 2024

Grenada competed at the 2016 Summer Olympics in Rio de Janeiro, Brazil, from 5 to 21 August 2016. This was the nation's ninth consecutive appearance at the Summer Olympics.

Grenada Olympic Committee sent a total of seven athletes, five men and two women, to the Games, competing only in athletics and swimming. The Grenadian team featured two returning athletes from London 2012; decathlete Kurt Felix and track sprinter Kirani James, who became the nation's first ever Olympic champion, earning the gold in the men's 400 metres. As the most successful athlete of the Games, James was selected to carry the Grenadian flag for the second consecutive time in the opening ceremony.

Grenada left Rio de Janeiro with an Olympic silver medal won by James in the men's 400 metres, unable to defend his title from the previous Games.

== Medalists ==
| Medal | Name | Sport | Event | Date |
|---|---|---|---|---|
| Silver | Kirani James | Athletics | Men's 400 m | 14 August |

== Athletics (track and field) ==
Grenadian athletes have so far achieved qualifying standards in the following athletics events (up to a maximum of 3 athletes in each event):

Key

- Note–Ranks given for track events are within the athlete's heat only
- Q = Qualified for the next round
- q = Qualified for the next round as a fastest loser or, in field events, by position without achieving the qualifying target
- NR = National record
- N/A = Round not applicable for the event
- Bye = Athlete not required to compete in round

Track & road events

| Athlete | Event | Heat | | Semifinal | | Final | |
| Athlete | Event | Result | Rank | Result | Rank | Result | Rank |
|---|---|---|---|---|---|---|---|
| Kirani James | Men's 400 m | 44.93 | 1 Q | 44.02 | 1 Q | 43.76 | 2nd place, silver medalist(s) |
| Bralon Taplin | Men's 400 m | 45.15 | 1 Q | 44.44 | 1 Q | 44.45 | 7 |
| Kanika Beckles | Women's 400 m | 52.41 | 5 | Did not advance | | | |

Combined events – Men's decathlon

| Athlete | Event | 100 m | LJ | SP | HJ | 400 m | 110H | DT | PV | JT | 1500 m | Final | Rank |
|---|---|---|---|---|---|---|---|---|---|---|---|---|---|
| Kurt Felix | Result | 10.93 | 7.42 | 14.77 | 2.07 | 49.14 SB | 14.79 | 45.10 | 4.50 | 69.92 PB | 4:30.53 PB | 8323 | 9 |
| Kurt Felix | Points | 876 | 915 | 776 | 868 | 855 | 875 | 769 | 760 | 888 | 741 | 8323 | 9 |
| Lindon Victor | Result | 10.83 | 7.11 | 14.80 | 1.98 | 49.80 | 15.74 | 53.24 | 4.40 | 63.54 | 4:44.73 | 7998 | 16 |
| Lindon Victor | Points | 899 | 840 | 777 | 785 | 824 | 762 | 938 | 731 | 791 | 651 | 7998 | 16 |

== Swimming ==
Grenada has received a Universality invitation from FINA to send two swimmers (one male and one female) to the Olympics.

| Athlete | Event | Heat | | Semifinal | | Final | |
| Athlete | Event | Time | Rank | Time | Rank | Time | Rank |
|---|---|---|---|---|---|---|---|
| Corey Ollivierre | Men's 100 m breaststroke | 1:08.68 | 46 | Did not advance | | | |
| Oreoluwa Cherebin | Women's 100 m butterfly | 1:10.40 | 41 | Did not advance | | | |

== See also ==
- Grenada at the 2015 Pan American Games
