= Grenada at the 2019 World Aquatics Championships =

- Flag of Grenada
- FINA code: GRN
- National federation: Grenada Amateur Swimming Association

in Gwangju, South Korea
- Competitors: 3 in 1 sport
- Medals: Gold 0 Silver 0 Bronze 0 Total 0

World Aquatics Championships appearances
- 1973; 1975; 1978; 1982; 1986; 1991; 1994; 1998; 2001; 2003; 2005; 2007; 2009; 2011; 2013; 2015; 2017; 2019; 2022; 2023; 2024

Grenada competed at the 2019 World Aquatics Championships in Gwangju, South Korea from 12 to 28 July.

== Swimming ==
Grenada entered three swimmers.

Men

Athlete	Event	Heat		Semifinal		Final	
Athlete	Event	Time	Rank	Time	Rank	Time	Rank
Delron Felix	100 m freestyle	53.08	85	did not advance			
Delron Felix	50 m backstroke	28.15	58	did not advance			
Kerry Ollivierre	50 m freestyle	24.23	81	did not advance			
Kerry Ollivierre	50 m butterfly	26.93	70	did not advance			

Women

Athlete	Event	Heat		Semifinal		Final	
Athlete	Event	Time	Rank	Time	Rank	Time	Rank
Kimberly Ince	50 m backstroke	32.27	36	did not advance			
Kimberly Ince	100 m backstroke	1:09.85	56	did not advance			
