= Grenada at the 1984 Summer Olympics =

- IOC code: GRN
- NOC: Grenada Olympic Committee

in Los Angeles
- Competitors: 7 (6 men and 1 woman) in 2 sports
- Flag bearer: Bernard Wilson
- Medals: Gold 0 Silver 0 Bronze 0 Total 0

Summer Olympics appearances (overview)
- 1984; 1988; 1992; 1996; 2000; 2004; 2008; 2012; 2016; 2020; 2024; 2028

Grenada was represented at the 1984 Summer Olympics in Los Angeles, California, United States by the Grenada Olympic Committee. It was the nation's first appearance at the Olympics.

In total, seven athletes including six men and one woman represented Grenada in two different sports including athletics and boxing.

== Background ==
The Grenada Olympic Committee was founded in 1982 and it was fully recognised by the International Olympic Committee in Los Angeles on 25 July 1984. As a result, Grenada were able to make their Olympic debut at the 1984 Summer Olympics in Los Angeles, California, United States.

== Competitors ==
In total, seven athletes represented Grenada at the 1984 Summer Olympics in Los Angeles, California, United States across two different sports.

Sport	Men	Women	Total
Athletics	1	1	2
Boxing	5	—	5
Total	6	1	7

== Athletics ==
In total, two Grenadian athletes participated in the athletics events – Jacinta Bartholomew in the women's long jump and Samuel Sawny in the men's 800 m.

The athletics events took place at the Los Angeles Memorial Coliseum in Exposition Park, Los Angeles from 3 to 12 August 1984.

== Boxing ==
In total, five Grenadian athletes participated in the boxing events – Chris Collins in the middleweight category, Tad Joseph in the flyweight, Anthony Longdon in the light heavyweight category, Emrol Phillip in the lightweight category and Bernard Wilson in the welterweight category.

The boxing events took place at the Los Angeles Memorial Sports Arena in Exposition Park, Los Angeles from 29 July to 11 August 1984.

Athlete	Event	Round of 32	Round of 16	Quarterfinals	Semifinals	Final	
Athlete	Event	Opposition Result	Opposition Result	Opposition Result	Opposition Result	Opposition Result	Rank
Chris Collins	Middleweight	Tuvale (SAM); L RSC-1	did not advance				
Anthony Longdon	Light heavyweight	Salman (IRQ); L KO-2	did not advance				
Emrol Phillip	Lightweight	Bye	Chinyanta (ZAM); L RSC-2	did not advance			
Bernard Wilson	Welterweight	Bye	Omoruyi (NGR); W RSC-3	Koskela (SWE); L KO-3	did not advance		

== Aftermath ==
Following their Olympic debut, Grenada became a regular competitor at the Olympics. They sent six athletes to the subsequent 1988 Summer Olympics in Seoul, South Korea and record delegation of nine athletes to the 2008 Summer Olympics in Beijing, China. They won their first Olympic medal at the 2012 Summer Olympics in London, England, United Kingdom.
