= Grenada at the 2024 Summer Olympics =

- Flag of Grenada
- IOC code: GRN
- NOC: Grenada Olympic Committee
- Website: www.grenadaolympic.com

in Paris, France 26 July 2024 – 11 August 2024
- Competitors: 6 (4 men and 2 women) in 2 sports
- Flag bearers (opening): Lindon Victor & Tilly Collymore
- Flag bearers (closing): Halle Hazzard & Kirani James
- Medals Ranked 80th: Gold 0 Silver 0 Bronze 2 Total 2

Summer Olympics appearances (overview)
- 1984; 1988; 1992; 1996; 2000; 2004; 2008; 2012; 2016; 2020; 2024

Grenada competed at the 2024 Summer Olympics in Paris from 26 July to 11 August 2024. It was the nation's eleventh consecutive appearance at the Summer Olympics since its official debut at the 1984.

== Medalists ==
Medal	Name	Sport	Event	Date
Bronze	Lindon Victor	Athletics	Men's decathlon	3 August
Bronze	Anderson Peters	Athletics	Men's javelin throw	8 August

== Competitors ==
The following is the list of a number of competitors in the Games.

Sport	Men	Women	Total
Athletics	3	1	4
Swimming	1	1	2
Total	4	2	6

== Athletics ==
Grenadian track and field athletes achieved the entry standards for Paris 2024, either by passing the direct qualifying mark (or time for track and road races) or by world ranking, in the following events (a maximum of 3 athletes each):

Key

- Note–Ranks given for track events are within the athlete's heat only
- Q = Qualified for the next round
- q = Qualified for the next round as the fastest loser or, in field events, by position without achieving the qualifying target
- NR = National record
- N/A = Round not applicable for the event
- Bye = Athlete not required to compete in round

Track and road events

Athlete	Event	Preliminary		Heat		Repechage		Semifinal		Final	
Athlete	Event	Result	Rank	Result	Rank	Result	Rank	Result	Rank	Result	Rank
Kirani James	Men's 400 m	—		44.78	1 Q	Bye		43.78 SB	1 Q	43.87	5
Halle Hazzard	Women's 100 m	11.88	2 Q	11.70	8	—		Did Not Advance			

Field events

Athlete	Event	Qualification		Final	
Athlete	Event	Result	Rank	Result	Rank
Anderson Peters	Men's javelin throw	88.63	2 Q	88.54	3rd place, bronze medalist(s)

Combined events – Men's decathlon

Athlete	Event	100 m	LJ	SP	HJ	400 m	110H	DT	PV	JT	1500 m	Final	Rank
Lindon Victor	Result	10.56	7.48	15.71 SB	2.02	47.84	14.62 SB	53.91 ODB	4.90 SB	68.22 SB	4:43.53 SB	8,711	3rd place, bronze medalist(s)
Lindon Victor	Points	961	930	833	822	917	896	952	880	862	658	8,711	3rd place, bronze medalist(s)

== Swimming ==
Grenada sent two swimmers to compete at the 2024 Paris Olympics.

Athlete	Event	Heat		Semifinal		Final	
Athlete	Event	Time	Rank	Time	Rank	Time	Rank
Zackary Gresham	Men's 100 m backstroke	58.92	44	Did not advance			
Tilly Collymore	Women's 100 m freestyle	58.84	26	Did not advance			

== See also ==
- Grenada at the 2023 Pan American Games
