= Grenada at the 2008 Summer Olympics =

- IOC code: GRN
- NOC: Grenada Olympic Committee
- Website: www.grenadaolympic.com

in Beijing
- Competitors: 9 in 2 sports
- Flag bearers: Alleyne Francique (opening); Neisha Bernard-Thomas (closing)
- Medals: Gold 0 Silver 0 Bronze 0 Total 0

Summer Olympics appearances (overview)
- 1984; 1988; 1992; 1996; 2000; 2004; 2008; 2012; 2016; 2020; 2024

Grenada competed in the 2008 Summer Olympics, held in Beijing, People's Republic of China from 8 to 24 August 2008. Nine athletes represented the country, eight track and field athletes and one boxer. Of the eight track and field competitors, five were women, and three were men. Although none of the athletes would win a medal, runners Allison George and Neisha Bernard-Thomas progressed past the qualification rounds, and participated on behalf of Grenada in the quarterfinals of their events. Grenada's Beijing delegation was their biggest at nine athletes, and marked the seventh consecutive appearance of Grenada at the Olympics.

Despite controversy surrounding Chinese activities in Tibet, Grenada continued to support the upholding of the Chinese Olympic Games. As thanks, the People's Republic of China constructed a new cricket stadium on the island, among other activities.

== Background ==
Grenada's debut was at the 1984 Summer Olympics in Los Angeles, where it entered six athletes (five men and one woman) across two sports; since its 1984 Los Angeles Olympics appearance and up to the 2008 Beijing appearance, Grenada sent athletes to seven consecutive Olympic Games. Its appearance in Beijing marked its largest appearance yet, with nine Olympic participants; additionally, more women participated in the Beijing Olympics on behalf of Grenada than any previous year, with five female athletes. This accounts for slightly less than half of all women who have participated in the Olympics between the 2008 Games and the Grenadan debut. Although the majority of athletes competing on Grenada's behalf participated in track and field (athletics) events, Rolande Moses participated as a boxer in the welterweight category. Although Neisha Bernard-Thomas and Allison George progressed to the semifinals in their respective events, further than the seven other athletes, no Grenadans medaled during the 2008 Summer Olympics.

== Athletics ==
=== Women's 100 m ===
Sherry Fletcher was the only Grenadan participant in the 2008 Olympic women's 100m sprint event. She participated in the second heat of the 15 August qualification match against seven other competitors, including American finalist Lauryn Williams. Fletcher ran her event in 11.65 seconds, ranking fifth place. She completed the event 0.28 seconds slower than French runner Christine Arron, who ranked first in the heat. Overall, Fletcher ranked 40th out of the 85 athletes who ranked in the qualification round, tying with British runner Laura Turner and Vietnamese runner Thi Huong Vu. Damola Osayomi of Nigeria, who ranked first in the qualification round, was 0.52 seconds faster than Fletcher, who did not advance to further rounds.

=== Women's 200 m ===
Allison George competed for Grenada in the women's 200 meter sprint on behalf of its delegation to the 2008 Beijing Olympics. She was placed in the sixth heat of six during the 18 August qualification round. George completed the event in 23.45 seconds, ranking sixth in her heat. Semifinalist Nataliia Pygyda of Ukraine ranked first in the heat, finishing 0.54 seconds ahead of George. Out of the 46 athletes who ranked during the qualification round, Allison George ranked 30th place. She qualified for semifinals.

George was placed in heat four of four during the 19 August semifinals round. She completed the event in 23.77 seconds, ranking eighth of eighth in her heat, 1.17 seconds behind finalist Sherone Simpson of Jamaica, who lead the heat. Overall, George ranked last of 31 ranking athletes during the semifinal round, tying with Eleni Artymata of Cyprus. George did not advance to finals.

=== Men's 400 m ===
Grenada sent two athletes, Alleyne Francique and Joel Phillip, as part of their delegation to represent it in the Men's 400m sprint. Francique participated in the fifth heat during the 17 August qualification round, ranking sixth of eight athletes. Francique earned a time of 46.15 seconds, which was 1.19 seconds slower than American runner LaShawn Merritt, the first-place runner in the heat, who would later earn gold in the event. Overall, Francique ranked 35th of 55 athletes. He did not progress to quarterfinals.

Meanwhile, Joel Phillip was placed in the sixth heat during the 17 August qualification race. Phillip also ranked sixth out of eight athletes in his heat, scoring a time of 46.30 seconds, which was 1.36 seconds behind heat leader Andrew Steele of the United Kingdom. Overall during the qualification match, Phillip ranked 39th of 55 athletes. He did not progress to quarterfinals.

=== Women's 400 m ===
Trish Bartholomew represented Grenada in the women's 400 meter run. During the 16 August qualification round, Bartholomew participated in the sixth of seven heats. She completed her event in 52.88 seconds, taking fifth place out of eight athletes. Bartholomew was one millisecond behind Kineke Alexander of St. Vincent and the Grenadines, who ranked fourth; and was 1.36 seconds behind Jamaica's Novelene Williams, who took first in the heat. Bartholomew tied with India's Mandeep Kaur for 33rd place out of 50 athletes. She did not advance to semifinals.

=== Men's triple jump ===
Randy Lewis was the only athlete who represented Grenada in the men's triple jump event of track and field during the 2008 Olympics. Lewis was placed in the second heat of two during the 17 August qualification round. During the round, Lewis completed his event with a final distance of 17.06 meters, ranking fifth in a heat of 18 competitors. Lewis was 0.24 meters short of Chinese triple jumper Li Yanxi, who ranked first in the heat and later ranked tenth in finals. Overall, Lewis ranked 15th out of 37 competitors in the qualification round, and did not proceed to finals.

=== Women's 800 m ===
Neisha Bernard-Thomas represented Grenada in the women's 800 meter event during the Beijing Olympics. Placed in heat four of the 14 August qualification round, Bernard-Thomas ranked fifth place out of six with a time of 2:00.09. She was within a second of British runner Marilyn Okoro, Slovakian Lucia Klocova, and Australian Tamsyn Lewis, who respectively ranked second, third, and fourth place in the event. Finalist Maria Mutola of Mozambique, who ranked first in the heat, was 1.18 seconds faster than Bernard-Thomas. Overall, Bernard-Thomas ranked 7th out of 40 qualifying runners.

Progressing to the semifinal round, Bernard-Thomas was placed in the third heat of three on 16 August. She completed the run in 2:01.84, ranking last in her heat and falling 4.56 seconds behind heat leader Janeth Jepkosgei Busienei of Kenya. Overall, Neisha Bernard-Thomas ranked 21st out of 23 semifinalist runners, and did not advance to the final round.

=== Women's long jump ===
Patricia Sylvester represented Grenada in the women's long jump event during the 2008 Summer Olympics. Placed in the first of two heats during the 18 August qualification round, Sylvester jumped a distance of 6.44 meters. This placed her at 11th of 19 ranking athletes in her heat. Sylvester's performance was 0.35 meters shorter than Maurren Higa Maggi of Brazil, who ranked first in the heat. Of 38 athletes, Patricia Sylvester tied the time of Viorica Țigău of Romania, ranking 21st. She did not advance to semifinals.

Men
Track & road events

| Athlete | Event | Heat | | Semifinal | | Final | |
| Athlete | Event | Result | Rank | Result | Rank | Result | Rank |
|---|---|---|---|---|---|---|---|
| Alleyne Francique | 400 m | 46.15 | 6 | Did not advance | | | |
| Joel Phillip | 400 m | 46.30 | 6 | Did not advance | | | |

Field events

| Athlete | Event | Qualification | | Final | |
| Athlete | Event | Distance | Position | Distance | Position |
|---|---|---|---|---|---|
| Randy Lewis | Triple jump | 17.06 | 15 | Did not advance | |

Women
Track & road events

| Athlete | Event | Heat | | Quarterfinal | | Semifinal | | Final | |
| Athlete | Event | Result | Rank | Result | Rank | Result | Rank | Result | Rank |
|---|---|---|---|---|---|---|---|---|---|
| Trish Bartholomew | 400 m | 52.88 | 5 | — | | Did not advance | | | |
| Neisha Bernard-Thomas | 800 m | 2:00.09 NR | 5 q | — | | 2:01.84 | 7 | Did not advance | |
| Sherry Fletcher | 100 m | 11.65 | 5 | Did not advance | | | | | |
| Allison George | 200 m | 23.45 | 6 q | 23.77 | 8 | Did not advance | | | |

Field events

| Athlete | Event | Qualification | | Final | |
| Athlete | Event | Distance | Position | Distance | Position |
|---|---|---|---|---|---|
| Patricia Sylvester | Long jump | 6.44 | 21 | Did not advance | |

Key

- Note–Ranks given for track events are within the athlete's heat only
- Q = Qualified for the next round
- q = Qualified for the next round as a fastest loser or, in field events, by position without achieving the qualifying target
- NR = National record
- N/A = Round not applicable for the event
- Bye = Athlete not required to compete in round

== Boxing ==
Grenada sent one boxer to the Olympic boxing tournament. Rolande Moses had fought nine boxing matches, including one at the 2007 World Championships for boxing in Chicago, since starting before he attempted the Olympic qualification event in Trinidad and Tobago. He lost in the qualifying event, although was selected by the Tripartite Commission to attend the Beijing Olympics to supplement the Grenada Olympic team, which historically had had less than six people and thus qualified for the aid.

Rolande Moses participated in the 10 August preliminaries, and was placed in the second bout versus Toureano Johnson of the Bahamas. As Olympic boxing rounds are scored by the number of successful punches scored, the end score of Moses' bout was 18 to 3 punches, with Moses scoring only 3 punches. Because Moses lost the bout, he did not progress to the Round of 16, which took place between 14 and 16 August.

| Athlete | Event | Round of 32 | Round of 16 | Quarterfinals | Semifinals | Final | |
| Athlete | Event | Opposition Result | Opposition Result | Opposition Result | Opposition Result | Opposition Result | Rank |
|---|---|---|---|---|---|---|---|
| Rolande Moses | Welterweight | Johnson (BAH); L 3–18 | Did not advance | | | | |

== See also ==
- Grenada at the 2007 Pan American Games
- Grenada at the 2010 Central American and Caribbean Games
