= Grenada at the 1992 Summer Olympics =

- IOC code: GRN
- NOC: Grenada Olympic Committee

in Barcelona
- Competitors: 4 (3 men and 1 woman) in 1 sport
- Flag bearer: Eugene Licorish
- Medals: Gold 0 Silver 0 Bronze 0 Total 0

Summer Olympics appearances (overview)
- 1984; 1988; 1992; 1996; 2000; 2004; 2008; 2012; 2016; 2020; 2024

Grenada competed at the 1992 Summer Olympics in Barcelona, Spain with four athletes, all competing in track and field.

== Competitors ==
The following is the list of number of competitors in the Games.

Sport	Men	Women	Total
Athletics	3	1	4
Total	3	1	4

== Results by event ==
=== Athletics ===
Men's 100m metres

- Gabriel Simeon

- Heat — 11.10 (→ did not advance, 65th place)

Men's Long Jump

- Eugene Licorish

- Qualification — 7.60 m (→ did not advance, 13th place)

Men's 400m metres

- Delon Felix

- Heat — 47.39 (→ did not advance, 5th place)

Women's 400m metres

- Shermaine Ross

- Heat — 55.49 (→ did not advance, 6th place)

== See also ==
- Grenada at the 1991 Pan American Games

== Sources ==
- Official Olympic Reports
- sports-reference
