= Grenada at the 1988 Summer Olympics =

- IOC code: GRN
- NOC: Grenada Olympic Committee

in Seoul
- Competitors: 6 (4 men and 2 women) in 2 sports
- Medals: Gold 0 Silver 0 Bronze 0 Total 0

Summer Olympics appearances (overview)
- 1984; 1988; 1992; 1996; 2000; 2004; 2008; 2012; 2016; 2020; 2024

Grenada competed at the 1988 Summer Olympics in Seoul, South Korea.

== Competitors ==
The following is the list of number of competitors in the Games.

| Sport | Men | Women | Total |
|---|---|---|---|
| Athletics | 0 | 2 | 2 |
| Boxing | 4 | – | 4 |
| Total | 4 | 2 | 6 |

== Athletics ==
Key
Note–Ranks given for track events are within the athlete's heat only
Q = Qualified for the next round
q = Qualified for the next round as a fastest loser or, in field events, by position without achieving the qualifying target
NR = National record
N/A = Round not applicable for the event
Bye = Athlete not required to compete in round

Women
Track & road events

Women's marathon

- Arlene Vincent Mark — 3:25:32 (→ 62nd place)

| Athlete | Event | Heat | | Semifinal | | Final | |
| Athlete | Event | Result | Rank | Result | Rank | Result | Rank |
|---|---|---|---|---|---|---|---|
| Agnes Griffith | 400 m | 57.09 | 7th(h) | did not advance | | | |
| Agnes Griffith | 200 m | 24.79 | 7th(h) | did not advance | | | |

== Boxing ==
Grenada sent four boxers to the Olympic boxing tournament.

| Athlete | Event | Round of 32 | Round of 16 | Quarterfinals | Semifinals | Final | |
| Athlete | Event | Opposition Result | Opposition Result | Opposition Result | Opposition Result | Opposition Result | Rank |
|---|---|---|---|---|---|---|---|
| Christopher "Chris" Collins | Light heavyweight | Bye | El-Naggar (EGY) | did not advance | | | |
| Garth Felix | Light heavyweight | Nieroba (FRG); L KO-1 | did not advance | | | | |
| Taddeus "Tad" Joseph | Bantamweight | García (MEX); L RSC-1 | did not advance | | | | |
| John Tobin | Welterweight | Bye | Ayed (SWE); L 5–0 | did not advance | | | |

== See also ==
- Grenada at the 1987 Pan American Games
