= Bruce Henderson (disambiguation) =

Bruce Henderson may refer to:

- Bruce Henderson (1915–1992), American entrepreneur
- Bruce Henderson (author) (born 1946), American journalist and writer
- Bruce Henderson (philatelist) (born 1950), New Zealand anarchist and hoaxer
