= Delron =

Delron is a given name. Notable people with the given name include:

- Delron Buckley (born 1977), South African former professional footballer
- Delron Felix (born 2000), Grenadian swimmer
