= Grenada at the Commonwealth Games =

- CGF code: GRN
- CGA: Grenada Olympic Committee
- Website: grenadaolympic.com
- Medals Ranked 37th: Gold 3 Silver 2 Bronze 2 Total 7

Commonwealth Games appearances (overview)
- 1970; 1974; 1978; 1982; 1986–1994; 1998; 2002; 2006; 2010; 2014; 2018; 2022; 2026; 2030

Grenada have competed in eleven Commonwealth Games. The first Games for the nation was in 1970. They attended the next three Games, but did not appear between 1982 and 1998. Grenada have only won 7 Commonwealth Games medal to date: in 2006, a silver in the men's 400 metres from Alleyne Francique, in 2014 they won a bronze medal in the men's decathlon from Kurt Felix and their first ever gold medal: Kirani James in the men's 400 metres. This made the Glasgow 2014 the most successful Commonwealth Games in their history. They repeated the achievement in the Gold Coast 2018 when Lindon Victor won their second gold medal, this time in the decathlon and Javelin Thrower Anderson Peters won the bronze medal in his event.

== All-time medal tally ==
	(gold)	(silver)	(bronze)	Total
Grenada	3	2	2	7

== Medals ==
Games	Gold	Silver	Bronze	Total
1970 Edinburgh	0	0	0	0
1974 Christchurch	0	0	0	0
1978 Edmonton	0	0	0	0
1982 Brisbane	0	0	0	0
1986 Edinburgh	did not attend			
1990 Auckland	did not attend			
1994 Victoria	did not attend			
1998 Kuala Lumpur	0	0	0	0
2002 Manchester	0	0	0	0
2006 Melbourne	0	1	0	1
2010 Delhi	0	0	0	0
2014 Glasgow	1	0	1	2
2018 Gold Coast	1	0	1	2
2022 Birmingham	1	1	0	2
Total	3	2	2	7
