= List of Grenadian records in athletics =

The following are the national records in athletics in Grenada maintained by its national athletics federation: Grenada Athletic Association (GAA).

== Outdoor ==
Key to tables: Awaiting ratification Record not kept by GAA Not ratified or later rescinded by GAA

=== Men ===
Event	Record	Athlete	Date	Meet	Place	Ref.
100 m	10.11 (+0.6 m/s)	Nazzio John	20 May 2023	NJCAA Championships	Hobbs, United States	
200 m	20.27 (+1.8 m/s)	Nazzio John	12 July 2025	Ed Murphey Classic	Memphis, United States	
300 m	31.20+	Kirani James	14 August 2016	Olympic Games	Rio de Janeiro, Brazil	
400 m	43.74	Kirani James	3 July 2014	Athletissima	Lausanne, Switzerland	
800 m	1:47.57	D'Angelo Brown	8 May 2026	Billy Hayes Invitational	Bloomington, United States	
1500 m	3:50.3 h	Donald Pierre	19 March 1972		Pointe-à-Pierre, Trinidad and Tobago	
3000 m	9:20.50	Neilon Joseph	20 April 2003	CARIFTA Games	Port-of-Spain, Trinidad and Tobago	
5000 m	14:58.23	Maurice Williams	20 April 1981	CARIFTA Games	Nassau, The Bahamas	
10,000 m	31:31.1 h	Emerald Frederick	8 March 1991		St. George’s, Grenada	
Half marathon	1:18:01	Reon Radix	30 April 2016		Les Abymes, Guadeloupe	
Marathon	2:46:50	Findlay O'Neal	4 June 1995		Port of Spain, Trinidad and Tobago	
110 m hurdles	13.52 (+1.2 m/s)	Alleyne Lett	6 June 2007	NCAA Division I Championships	Sacramento, United States	
400 m hurdles	49.51	Shane Charles	14 May 2006	Pac-10 Championships	Eugene, United States	
3000 m steeplechase						
High jump	2.21 m	Paul Caraballo	26 April 1997	Drake Relays	Des Moines, United States	
Pole vault	4.92 m (Note: record set during decathlon competition)	Lindon Victor	26 April 2021	High Performance #2	Chula Vista, United States	
Long jump	8.09 m (±0.0 m/s)	Eugene Licorish	5 May 1989		Port of Spain, Trinidad and Tobago	
Triple jump	17.49 m (±0.0 m/s)	Randy Lewis	22 May 2008		São Paulo, Brazil	
Shot put	18.70 m	Josh Boateng	3 May 2019	Lone Star Championships	Portales, United States	
Discus throw	61.56 m	Josh Boateng	28 April 2022		Commerce, United States	
Hammer throw	56.51 m	Kellon Alexis	21 April 2017	Bobcat Twilight	San Marcos, United States	
Javelin throw	93.07 m	Anderson Peters	13 May 2022	Doha Diamond League	Doha, Qatar	
Decathlon	8539 pts	Lindon Victor	11–12 May 2017	SEC Championships	Columbia, United States	
Decathlon	100m / Long jump / Shot put / High jump / 400m / 110m H / Discus / Pole vault / Javelin / 1500m; 10.64 (+3.6 m/s) / 7.35 m (+2.1 m/s) / 15.18 m / 2.05 m / 48.74 / 14.45 (+1.8 m/s) / 55.22 m / 4.80 m / 66.01 m / 4:55.91					
Decathlon	8550 pts	Lindon Victor	17–18 September 2022	Décastar	Talence, France	
Decathlon	100m / Long jump / Shot put / High jump / 400m / 110m H / Discus / Pole vault / Javelin / 1500m; 10.61 (+3.1 m/s) / 7.49 m (+1.1 m/s) / 15.75 m / 2.02 m / 48.20 / 14.70 (−0.7 m/s) / 51.00 m / 4.70 m / 68.97 m / 4:43.74					
Decathlon	8756 pts	Lindon Victor	25–26 August 2023	World Championships	Budapest, Hungary	
Decathlon	100m / Long jump / Shot put / High jump / 400m / 110m H / Discus / Pole vault / Javelin / 1500m; 10.60 (+0.1 m/s) / 7.55 m (+1.0 m/s) / 15.94 m / 2.02 m / 48.05 / 14.47 (+0.2 m/s) / 54.97 m / 4.80 m / 68.05 m / 4:39.67					
20 km walk (road)						
50 km walk (road)						
4 × 100 m relay	40.13	Grenada; Andon Mitchell; Bruce Swan; Ferron McIntosh; Aldin Alexander	5 July 2003	Central American and Caribbean Championships	St. George’s, Grenada	
4 × 100 m relay	39.16	Grenada; Samuel Green; Troy Mason; Ethan Sam; Nazzio John	5 July 2025	Barbados Grand Prix	Bridgetown, Barbados	
4 × 400 m relay	3:04.27	Grenada; Joel Redhead; Kirani James; J. Charles; Rondell Bartholomew	17 July 2011		Mayagüez, Puerto Rico	

=== Women ===
Event	Record	Athlete	Date	Meet	Place	Ref.
100 m	11.18 (+0.9 m/s)	Sherry Fletcher	23 July 2007	Pan American Games	Rio de Janeiro, Brazil	
200 m	22.67 (+1.7 m/s)	Sherry Fletcher	9 June 2007	NCAA Division I Championships	Sacramento, United States	
400 m	50.64	Hazel-Ann Regis	16 May 2004		Oxford, United States	
800 m	1:59.60	Neisha Bernard-Thomas	1 May 2010	Jamaica Invitational	Kingston, Jamaica	
1500 m	4:23.00	Neisha Bernard-Thomas	13 June 2009		Waltham, United States	
3000 m	10:08.2 h	Geraldine McQueen	31 March 1991	CARIFTA Games	Port of Spain, Trinidad and Tobago	
5000 m						
10,000 m						
Half marathon	2:02:28	Kenisha Pascal	6 July 2003	Central American and Caribbean Championships	St. George's, Grenada	
Marathon	3:22:40	Jenifer Boca	4 November 1990	New York City Marathon	New York, United States	
100 m hurdles	13.76	Ruthlyn Granger	12 May 2001		Columbia, United States	
400 m hurdles	58.37	Kishara George	29 May 2004		Baton Rouge, United States	
3000 m steeplechase						
High jump	1.86 m	Patricia Sylvester	11 June 2013	3rd International Track and Field Games	Toronto, Canada	
Pole vault						
Long jump	6.71 m (±0.0 m/s)	Patricia Sylvester	29 March 2008		Atlanta, United States	
Triple jump	14.06 m (−0.1 m/s)	Patricia Sylvester	7 June 2008		Athens, United States	
Shot put	18.33 m	Kelsie Murrell	30 March 2024	Battle on the Bayou	Baton Rouge, United States	
Discus throw	57.56 m	Jamora Alves	30 May 2026	NCAA East First Round	Lexington, United States	
Hammer throw	58.85 m	Sheba George	5 May 2002		Storrs, United States	
Javelin throw	51.13 m	Candesha Scott	28 March 2016	CARIFTA Games	St. George’s, Grenada	
Heptathlon	5254 pts	Joniar Thomas	1–2 December 2021	Junior Pan American Games	Cali, Colombia	
Heptathlon	100m H / High jump / Shot put / 200m / Long jump / Javelin / 800m; 13.83 (±0.0 m/s) / 1.68 m / 10.07 m / 24.33 (−0.4 m/s) / 5.59 m (+0.8 m/s) / 42.55 m / 2:46.93					
20 km walk (road)						
4 × 100 m relay	44.95	Grenada; Sherine Wells; Janelle Redhead; Lucy Fortune; Trish Bartholomew	10 June 2012	OECS Invitational	Basseterre, Saint Kitts	
4 × 400 m relay	3:32.99	Grenada; Kishara George; Neisha Bernard-Thomas; Jackie-Ann Morain; Hazel-Ann Regis	6 July 2003	Central American and Caribbean Championships	St. George's, Grenada	

=== Mixed ===
Event	Record	Athlete	Date	Meet	Place	Ref.
4 × 400 m relay	3:27.22	Grenada; Cheffonia Houston; Jayden Phillip; Taigon Peterkin; Jamara Patterson	9 April 2023	CARIFTA Games	Nassau, Bahamas	

== Indoor ==
=== Men ===
Event	Record	Athlete	Date	Meet	Place	Ref.	Video
55 m	6.19	Sean Lambert	21 February 2003		Knoxville, United States		
60 m	6.62	Nazzio John	9 January 2026	UK Rod McCravy Memorial	Louisville, United States		
200 m	20.58 A	Kirani James	21 January 2011	Cherry & Silver Invitational	Albuquerque, United States		
300 m	31.97	Bralon Taplin	14 February 2017	Czech Indoor Gala	Ostrava, Czech Republic		
400 m	44.80 WJR	Kirani James	27 February 2011	SEC Championships	Fayetteville, United States		
600 m	1:17.69 OT	Nathan Hood	2 March 2019	NJCAA Championships	Pittsburg, United States		
800 m	1:49.72	Nathan Hood	13 March 2021	NCAA Division II Championships	Birmingham, United States		
800 m	1:49.59 OT	Shane Charles	25 February 2005		Seattle, United States		
1000 m	2:26.72	D'Angelo Brown	15 February 2025	CHSAA Championships	Staten Island, United States		
1500 m							
3000 m	9:22.29	Nathan Hood	12 January 2019	Jim Green Track & Field Invitational	Lexington, United States		
60 m hurdles	7.70 (heat)	Alleyne Lett	9 March 2007	NCAA Division I Championships	Fayetteville, United States		
60 m hurdles	7.70 (final)	Alleyne Lett	9 March 2007	NCAA Division I Championships	Fayetteville, United States		
High jump	2.17 m	Kurt Felix	24 February 2011	Western Athletic Conference Championships	Nampa, United States		
High jump	2.18 m	Nishorn Pierre	13 January 2023	Spartan Invitational	Staten Island, United States		
Pole vault	4.76 m	Lindon Victor	11 March 2017	NCAA Division I Championships	College Station, United States		
Long jump	7.69 m	Keron Francis	24 February 2006		Nampa, United States		
Triple jump	17.27 m	Randy Lewis	10 February 2008	BW-Bank Meeting	Karlsruhe, Germany		
Shot put	17.77 m	Josh Boateng	9 February 2019	Gorilla Classic	Pittsburg, United States		
Weight throw	18.01 m	Kellon Alexis	28 January 2017	Pittsburg State Invitational	Pittsburg, United States		
Heptathlon	5986 pts	Kurt Felix	18–19 March 2016	World Championships	Portland, United States		
Heptathlon	60m / Long jump / Shot put / High jump / 60m H / Pole vault / 1000m; 7.00 / 7.45 m / 15.02 m / 2.11 m / 8.34 / 4.50 m / 2:44.23						
Heptathlon	6029 pts	Lindon Victor	18–19 March 2022	World Championships	Belgrade, Serbia		
Heptathlon	60m / Long jump / Shot put / High jump / 60m H / Pole vault / 1000m; 6.91 / 7.56 m / 15.65 m / 2.05 m / 8.41 / 4.70 m / 2:48.21						
5000 m walk							
4 × 400 m relay							

=== Women ===
Event	Record	Athlete	Date	Meet	Place	Ref.
55 m	6.97	Halle Hazzard	16 December 2017		Staten Island, United States	
60 m	7.23	Halle Hazzard	12 March 2021		Fayetteville, United States	
200 m	23.02	Hazel-Ann Regis	27 February 2005	SEC Championships	Fayetteville, United States	
400 m	50.92	Hazel-Ann Regis	12 March 2005	NCAA Division I Championships	Fayetteville, United States	
800 m	2:03.93	Neisha Bernard-Thomas	12 March 2005	NCAA Division I Championships	Fayetteville, United States	
1500 m	4:47.62 y	Neisha Bernard-Thomas	5 March 2010		Baton Rouge, United States	
Mile	4:47.62	Neisha Bernard-Thomas	5 March 2010		Baton Rouge, United States	
3000 m						
60 m hurdles	8.76	Colleen Felix	20 February 2009		Levelland, United States	
High jump	1.89 m (Note: outdoor mark ratified as absolute record)	Patricia Sylvester	9 March 2007	NCAA Division I Championships	Fayetteville, United States	
Pole vault						
Long jump	6.46 m	Jacinta Bartholomew	23 February 1990		New York City, United States	
Long jump	6.56 m	Joniar Thomas	20 January 2024	Ted Nelson Invitational	College Station, United States	
Triple jump	13.60 m	Patricia Sylvester	27 January 2007		Gainesville, United States	
Shot put	15.13 m (Note: outdoor mark ratified as absolute record)	Sheba George	2 March 2002		Boston, United States	
Shot put	16.30 m	Kelsie Murrel-Ross	18 February 2023	Region VI Championships	Pittsburg, United States	
Pentathlon	2902 pts OT	Colleen Felix	7 February 2009		Lubbock, United States	
Pentathlon	60m H / High jump / Shot put / Long jump / 800m; 8.48 (55m Hurdles) / 1.55 m / 12.90 m / 4.95 m / 3:42.71					
3000 m walk						
4 × 400 m relay						
