= Grenada at the 2023 World Aquatics Championships =

- Flag of Grenada
- FINA code: GRN
- National federation: Grenada Amateur Swimming Association

in Fukuoka, Japan
- Competitors: 2 in 1 sport
- Medals: Gold 0 Silver 0 Bronze 0 Total 0

World Aquatics Championships appearances
- 1973; 1975; 1978; 1982; 1986; 1991; 1994; 1998; 2001; 2003; 2005; 2007; 2009; 2011; 2013; 2015; 2017; 2019; 2022; 2023; 2024

Grenada is set to compete at the 2023 World Aquatics Championships in Fukuoka, Japan from 14 to 30 July.

== Swimming ==
Grenada entered 2 swimmers.

Men

| Athlete | Event | Heat | | Semifinal | | Final | |
| Athlete | Event | Time | Rank | Time | Rank | Time | Rank |
|---|---|---|---|---|---|---|---|
| Zackary Gresham | 100 metre backstroke | 59.68 | 57 | Did not advance | | | |
| Zackary Gresham | 100 metre butterfly | 56.91 | 60 | Did not advance | | | |

Women

| Athlete | Event | Heat | | Semifinal | | Final | |
| Athlete | Event | Time | Rank | Time | Rank | Time | Rank |
|---|---|---|---|---|---|---|---|
| Tilly Collymore | 50 metre freestyle | 27.35 | 60 | Did not advance | | | |
| Tilly Collymore | 100 metre freestyle | 59.85 | 45 | Did not advance | | | |
