= Kellon Alexis =

Grenadian athlete (born 1992)

Personal information
- Nationality: Grenadian
- Born: 19 November 1992 (age 33)

Sport
- Sport: Track and field

Achievements and titles
- Personal best(s): Hammer Throw: 56.51m NR; Weight Throw: 18.01m NR; Discus: 56.57m

Kellon Alexis (born 19 November 1992) is a Grenadian athlete who specializes in throwing events. In 2014 he set a National Record in the Hammer throw with a distance of 54.22 m. He also set a record in the men's Weight throw with a distance of 17.06m.

On 20 January 2017, he further improved the national record with a throw of 17.34m at the MSSU OPEN at the Missouri Southern State University. On 28 January he further improved on his Personal Best and the National Record with a throw of 18.01 meters at the Pittsburg state invitational. Kellon's Record breaking season would continue with a Hammer Throw of 56.51m at the Bobcat Twilight in San Marcos, Texas on 21 April. He also went on to receive all regional honors in Discus, Hammer and Javelin throw in that season.

== Competition record ==
Year	Competition	Venue	Position	Event	Notes
Representing Grenada
2011	CARIFTA Games	Montego Bay, Jamaica	3rd	Discus throw (U20)	50.60 m
2014	2014 NACAC Under-23 Championships in Athletics	British Columbia, Canada	5th	Discus throw	51.09m
2014	2014 NACAC Under-23 Championships in Athletics	British Columbia, Canada	7th	Hammer throw	53.59m
