= Grenada at the 2015 World Aquatics Championships =

- Flag of Grenada
- FINA code: GRN
- National federation: Grenada Amateur Swimming Association
- Website: www.grenadaswimming.org

in Kazan, Russia
- Competitors: 3 in 1 sport
- Medals: Gold 0 Silver 0 Bronze 0 Total 0

World Aquatics Championships appearances
- 1973; 1975; 1978; 1982; 1986; 1991; 1994; 1998; 2001; 2003; 2005; 2007; 2009; 2011; 2013; 2015; 2017; 2019; 2022; 2023; 2024

Grenada competed at the 2015 World Aquatics Championships in Kazan, Russia from 24 July to 9 August 2015.

== Swimming ==
Grenadian swimmers have achieved qualifying standards in the following events (up to a maximum of 2 swimmers in each event at the A-standard entry time, and 1 at the B-standard):

Men

Athlete	Event	Heat		Semifinal		Final	
Athlete	Event	Time	Rank	Time	Rank	Time	Rank
Corey Ollivierre	50 m breaststroke	30.61	58	did not advance			
Corey Ollivierre	100 m breaststroke	1:08.39	69	did not advance			
Kerry Ollivierre	50 m freestyle	25.37	78	did not advance			
Kerry Ollivierre	50 m backstroke	30.42	62	did not advance			

Women

Athlete	Event	Heat		Semifinal		Final	
Athlete	Event	Time	Rank	Time	Rank	Time	Rank
Oreoluwa Cherebin	50 m breaststroke	35.39	55	did not advance			
Oreoluwa Cherebin	100 m breaststroke	1:21.06	63	did not advance			
