= Grenada at the 2017 World Aquatics Championships =

- Flag of Grenada
- FINA code: GRN
- National federation: Grenada Amateur Swimming Association
- Website: www.grenadaswimming.org

in Budapest, Hungary
- Competitors: 3 in 1 sport
- Medals: Gold 0 Silver 0 Bronze 0 Total 0

World Aquatics Championships appearances
- 1973; 1975; 1978; 1982; 1986; 1991; 1994; 1998; 2001; 2003; 2005; 2007; 2009; 2011; 2013; 2015; 2017; 2019; 2022; 2023; 2024

Grenada competed at the 2017 World Aquatics Championships in Budapest, Hungary from 14 July to 30 July.

== Swimming ==
Grenada has received a Universality invitation from FINA to send three swimmers (two men and one woman) to the World Championships.

| Athlete | Event | Heat | | Semifinal | | Final | |
| Athlete | Event | Time | Rank | Time | Rank | Time | Rank |
|---|---|---|---|---|---|---|---|
| Corey Ollivierre | Men's 50 m breaststroke | 29.94 | 54 | did not advance | | | |
| Corey Ollivierre | Men's 100 m breaststroke | 1:08.17 | 67 | did not advance | | | |
| Kerry Ollivierre | Men's 50 m freestyle | 24.90 | 94 | did not advance | | | |
| Kerry Ollivierre | Men's 100 m freestyle | 55.91 | 90 | did not advance | | | |
| Oreoluwa Cherebin | Women's 50 m breaststroke | 34.88 | 37 | did not advance | | | |
| Oreoluwa Cherebin | Women's 100 m breaststroke | 1:18.91 | 48 | did not advance | | | |
