= Agnes Griffith =

Grenadian sprinter

Personal information
- Full name: Agnes Geraldine Griffith
- Nationality: Grenadian
- Born: 6 March 1969 Woodlands, St. George's, Grenada
- Died: 25 February 2015 (aged 45) Bristol, Pennsylvania, United States

Sport
- Sport: Sprinting
- Event: 200 metres

Agnes "Aggie" Geraldine Griffith (6 March 1969 – 25 February 2015) was a Grenadian sprinter. As an athlete, she was selected to compete for Grenada at the 1988 Summer Olympics She competed in the women's 200 metres and women's 400 metres, and failed to advance further from the preliminary heats of both events.

== Biography ==
Agnes "Aggie" Geraldine Griffith was born on 6 March 1969 in Woodlands in St. George's, Grenada. As an athlete, she competed internationally for Grenada in sprinting. She was selected to compete for Grenada at the 1988 Summer Olympics held in Seoul, South Korea.

Griffith first competed in the preliminary rounds of the women's 400 metres held on 23 September. She competed in the seventh heat against six other competitors. There, she recorded a time of 57.09 seconds and placed last, failing to advance to the quarterfinals held the following day. She then competed in the preliminary rounds of the women's 200 metres held on 28 September. She competed in the second heat against seven other competitors. There she recorded a time of 24.79 seconds and placed seventh, again failing to advance to the quarterfinals of the event held the following day. Although she failed to qualify for the quarterfinals, she set a new personal best time in the distance. The following year, she set a new personal best time in the 400 metres with a time of 56.2 seconds.

Griffith later moved to the United States. She later died on 25 February 2015 in Bristol, Pennsylvania, United States, at the age of 45.
