= Grenada at the 1996 Summer Olympics =

- IOC code: GRN
- NOC: Grenada Olympic Committee
- Website: www.grenadaolympic.com

in Atlanta
- Competitors: 5 (5 men and 0 women) in 1 sport
- Flag bearer: Jason Charter
- Medals: Gold 0 Silver 0 Bronze 0 Total 0

Summer Olympics appearances (overview)
- 1984; 1988; 1992; 1996; 2000; 2004; 2008; 2012; 2016; 2020; 2024

Grenada competed at the 1996 Summer Olympics in Atlanta, United States with five athletes, all competing in track and field.

== Competitors ==
The following is the list of number of competitors in the Games.

| Sport | Men | Women | Total |
|---|---|---|---|
| Athletics | 5 | 0 | 5 |
| Total | 5 | 0 | 5 |

== Athletics ==
Men
Track and road events

| Athlete | Event | Heats | | Quarterfinal | | Semifinal | | Final | |
| Athlete | Event | Result | Rank | Result | Rank | Result | Rank | Result | Rank |
|---|---|---|---|---|---|---|---|---|---|
| Richard Britton; Rufus Jones; Alleyne Francique; Clint Williams | 4 × 400 metres relay | DQ | | —N/a | | Did not advance | | | |

Field events

| Athlete | Event | Qualification | | Final | |
| Athlete | Event | Distance | Position | Distance | Position |
|---|---|---|---|---|---|
| Kenny Lewis | Long jump | 7.41 | 39 | Did not advance | |

== See also ==
- Grenada at the 1995 Pan American Games
