= Shane Charles =

Grenadian retired athlete

Personal information
- Nationality: Grenadian
- Born: August 30, 1983 (age 42) St. George's, Grenada

Sport
- Country: Grenada
- Sport: Track and field

Achievements and titles
- Personal best: 400 m hurdles: 49.51
Medal record
Men's athletics
Representing Grenada
CARIFTA Games (U20)
Bronze medal – third place	2001 Bridgetown	400 m hurdles
Silver medal – second place	2002 Nassau	400 m hurdles

Shane Charles (born 30 August 1983) is a Grenadian retired athlete who specialized in the 400 metres hurdles. In 2001 he set the junior national record with a time of 53.89. On 14 May 2006 he made a time of 49.51 in the 400 m hurdles, the senior national record in this event. He also set an indoor 800 metres national record with a time of 1:49.59 (on an oversized track).

== Competition record ==
Year	Competition	Venue	Position	Event	Notes
Representing Grenada
2001	CARIFTA Games	Bridgetown, Barbados	3rd	400 m hurdles (U20)	53.89
2002	CARIFTA Games	Nassau, Bahamas	2nd	400 m hurdles (U20)	52.08
2002	World Junior Championships	Kingston, Jamaica	6th (h)	400 m hurdles	53.49
2003	Pan American Games	Bridgetown, Barbados	8th	4 × 400 m relay	3:09.50
