= Grenada at the 2004 Summer Olympics =

- IOC code: GRN
- NOC: Grenada Olympic Committee
- Website: www.grenadaolympic.com

in Athens
- Competitors: 5 in 2 sports
- Flag bearer: Alleyne Francique
- Medals: Gold 0 Silver 0 Bronze 0 Total 0

Summer Olympics appearances (overview)
- 1984; 1988; 1992; 1996; 2000; 2004; 2008; 2012; 2016; 2020; 2024

Grenada competed at the 2004 Summer Olympics in Athens, Greece, from 13 to 29 August 2004. This was the nation's sixth consecutive appearance at the Olympics.

Grenada Olympic Committee sent a total of five athletes (three men and two women), competing only in athletics and swimming. Track runner and world indoor champion Alleyne Francique was appointed by the committee to become the nation's flag bearer in the opening ceremony. A top favorite in the men's 400 metres, Francique narrowly missed a chance to grab the nation's first ever Olympic medal with a fantastic fourth-place finish.

== Athletics ==
Grenadan athletes have so far achieved qualifying standards in the following athletics events (up to a maximum of 3 athletes in each event at the 'A' Standard, and 1 at the 'B' Standard).

Men
Track & road events

Athlete	Event	Heat		Semifinal		Final	
Athlete	Event	Result	Rank	Result	Rank	Result	Rank
Alleyne Francique	400 m	45.32	1 Q	45.08	3 q	44.66	4

Field events

Athlete	Event	Qualification		Final	
Athlete	Event	Distance	Position	Distance	Position
Randy Lewis	Triple jump	16.33	28	did not advance	

Women
Track & road events

Athlete	Event	Heat		Semifinal		Final	
Athlete	Event	Result	Rank	Result	Rank	Result	Rank
Hazel-Ann Regis	400 m	51.66	3 Q	51.47	7	did not advance	

Key

- Note–Ranks given for track events are within the athlete's heat only
- Q = Qualified for the next round
- q = Qualified for the next round as a fastest loser or, in field events, by position without achieving the qualifying target
- NR = National record
- N/A = Round not applicable for the event
- Bye = Athlete not required to compete in round

== Swimming ==
Men

Athlete	Event	Heat		Semifinal		Final	
Athlete	Event	Time	Rank	Time	Rank	Time	Rank
Johnathan Steele	50 m freestyle	26.40	65	did not advance			

Women

Athlete	Event	Heat		Semifinal		Final	
Athlete	Event	Time	Rank	Time	Rank	Time	Rank
Melissa Ashby	100 m breaststroke	1:22.67	45	did not advance			

== See also ==
- Grenada at the 2003 Pan American Games
