= Kishara George =

Medal record

Women's athletics

Representing Grenada

CAC Championships
Silver medal – second place	CAC Junior Championships	4×400 m

CAC Junior Championships
Bronze medal – third place	CAC Junior Championships	400 m
Silver medal – second place	CAC Junior Championships	4×400 m

CARIFTA Games (U17)
Bronze medal – third place	1998 Port of Spain	400 m
Silver medal – second place	1999 Fort-de-France	400 m

CARIFTA Games (U20)
Silver medal – second place	2002 Nassau, Bahamas	400 m

Kishara George (born 22 September 1983) is a retired Grenadian sprinter. On 6 July 2003 at the Central American and Caribbean Championships in Athletics she was part of a 4×400 m relay team that placed second to Jamaica but still managed to set a new National Record time of 3:32.99 minutes in the event. On 28 May 2004, this time competing in the 400 m hurdles she was again able to set a national record with a time of 58.37.

== Competition record ==
Year	Competition	Venue	Position	Event	Notes
Representing Grenada
1998	CARIFTA Games	Port of Spain, Trinidad and Tobago	3rd	400 m (U17)	54.80
1998	Central American and Caribbean Junior Championships	San Juan, Puerto Rico	3rd	400 m	56.47
1999	CARIFTA Games	Fort-de-France, Martinique	2nd	400 m (U17)	54.88
2000	Central American and Caribbean Junior Championships (U20)	San Juan, Puerto Rico	2nd	4x400 m	3:40.24
2002	CARIFTA Games	Nassau, Bahamas	2nd	400 m (U20)	54.87
2002	CARIFTA Games	Nassau, Bahamas	7th	200 m (U20)	24.96(-1.5 )
2003	Central American and Caribbean Championships	St. George's, Grenada	2nd	4x400 m	3:32.99
