= Kenisha Pascal =

Personal information
- Nickname: 'Bones'
- Born: St. George's, Grenada

Sport
- Country: Grenada
- Sport: Track and field
- Club: St. David's Track Blazers

Achievements and titles
- Personal bests: Half marathon: 2:14.18; 3000m :10:16.04
Medal record
Women's athletics
Representing Grenada
Central American and Caribbean Championships
Bronze medal – third place	2003 St. George's	Half Marathon
OECS Track And Field Championships
Gold medal – first place	2016 Tortola	800m
Gold medal – first place	2016 Tortola	1500m
Gold medal – first place	2016 Tortola	3000m
Silver medal – second place	2016 Tortola	4x400m

Kenisha Pascal (born 1987) is a Grenadian middle- and long-distance runner. She set the Grenadian national record for the half marathon in 2003 with a time of 2:14.18. After winning three Gold and one Silver medal at the 2016, Kenisha was awarded the Veda Bruno Award for most outstanding female at the OECS Championship. On 4 November 2018 Kenisha won the second leg of the South American 10K which was held in Guyana.

== Competition record ==
Year	Competition	Venue	Position	Event	Notes
Representing Grenada
2003	Central American and Caribbean Championships in Athletics	St. George's, Grenada	3rd	Half marathon	2:02:28
2016	OECS Track and Field Championships	Tortola, British Virgin Islands	1st	3000m	10:30.03
2016	OECS Track and Field Championships	Tortola, British Virgin Islands	1st	800m	2:17.26
2016	OECS Track and Field Championships	Tortola, British Virgin Islands	1st	1500m	4:45.51
2016	OECS Track and Field Championships	Tortola, British Virgin Islands	2nd	4 × 400 m RELAY	3:41.75
2017	Grenada Invitational	St. George's, Grenada	3rd	3000m	10:16.04
2017	Whitsuntide Games	St. George's, Grenada	1st	800m	2:15.67
2017	Whitsuntide Games	St. George's, Grenada	1st	1500m	4:47.09
2017	OECS Track And Field Championships	Kirani James Athletic Stadium, Grenada	1st	3000m	10:54.85
2017	OECS Track And Field Championships	Kirani James Athletic Stadium, Grenada	1st	800m	2:14.38
2017	OECS Track And Field Championships	Kirani James Athletic Stadium, Grenada	1st	1500m	4:49.51
2017	OECS Track And Field Championships	Kirani James Athletic Stadium, Grenada	2nd	4 × 400 m RELAY	3:37.48
