= Paul Williams (sprinter) =

Personal information
- Born: 5 April 1986 (age 40) Saint Patrick, Grenada

Sport
- Country: Grenada
- Sport: Athletics
- Event: Sprint
- Updated on 12 December 2014

Paul Williams (born 5 April 1986) is a Grenadian sprinter. He competed in the Men's 100m event at the 2012 Summer Olympics but was eliminated in the first round.

== Personal bests ==
=== Outdoor ===
- 100 m: 10.49 s (wind: NWI) – New York City, United States, 29 May 2014

10.23 s (wind: +0.1 m/s) – Holmdel, United States, 16 June 2012 (doubtful timing)

- 200 m: 21.62 s (wind: +0.1 m/s) – Greensboro, United States, 15 May 2011

=== Indoor ===
- 60 m: 6.69 s – Albuquerque, United States, 8 February 2014

== Achievements ==
Year	Competition	Venue	Position	Event	Notes
Representing Grenada
2012	Olympic Games	London, United Kingdom	7th (h)	100m	10.65 (wind: 0.0 m/s)
2013	Central American and Caribbean Championships	Morelia, Mexico	27th (h)	100m	10.64 A (wind: +1.4 m/s)
2014	World Indoor Championships	Sopot, Poland	33rd (h)	60m	6.82
2014	Commonwealth Games	Glasgow, United Kingdom	6th (h)	100m	10.70 (wind: +0.2 m/s)
2014	Central American and Caribbean Games	Xalapa, Mexico	7th (h)	100m	10.93 A (wind: -0.7 m/s)
