= Rudy Sylvan =

American football player (born 1984)

No. 46
- Position: Tight end

Personal information
- Born: December 23, 1984 (age 41); San Francisco, California
- Listed height: 6 ft 4 in (1.93 m)
- Listed weight: 272 lb (123 kg)

Career information
- College: Ohio
- NFL draft: 2007: undrafted

Career history
- Detroit Lions (2007)
- Stats at Pro Football Reference

Rudy Sylvan (born December 23, 1984) is an American former football tight end. He was originally signed by the Detroit Lions as an undrafted free agent in 2007. He played college football at Ohio.

== College career ==
In 2004, Sylvan played in all 11 games for the Ohio Bobcats and turned his first catch into a 25-yard touchdown in the season opener against VMI. His second catch produced similar results, an eight-yard touchdown pass versus Buffalo. He kept the streak alive with a 17-yard touchdown catch against Marshall on his third reception of the season. His touchdown streak was broken, however, when he caught a pass for 11 yards versus Bowling Green that did not result in points. In his senior season, Sylvan played in all 11 games. He finished second among Ohio tight ends with five catches for 24 yards and had career highs in catches with two during three occasions. Also during his senior season, Sylvan helped lead the Bobcats to a MAC East Division title, a MAC Championship Game appearance, and a 2007 GMAC Bowl appearance. However, Sylvan was academically ineligible for the GMAC bowl game and was forced to sit out.

== Junior college career ==
Sylvan attended Solano College in Fairfield, California. While there, he had 18 catches for 350 yards as a freshman prior to transferring to Ohio.

== High school career ==
Sylvan attended Armijo and Vanden High Schools, earning all-conference, all-county and all-city honors on the defensive line during his senior season. He led Vanden his senior year with 115 total tackles, adding 1.5 sacks and an interception. Sylvan was voted a share of the team's Most Valuable Defensive Player Award and helped the Vikings to a 9–3 record and their ninth straight playoff appearance as a senior.
