= Bruce Henderson (philatelist) =

New Zealand anarchist, hoaxer and producer of artistamps

Bruce Ronald Henderson, also known as Bruce Grenville and Martin Renwick (born 1950), is a New Zealand anarchist, hoaxer and producer of artistamps. He is particularly known for the creation of the fictional Sultanate of Occussi-Ambeno.

== Early life ==
Bruce Henderson was born in Wellington, New Zealand, in 1950.

== Sultanate of Occussi-Ambeno ==
In the 1970s and 1980s he gained notoriety for a hoax involving the fabrication of the utopian Sultanate State of Occussi-Ambeno, located as an exclave on the Island of Timor at Oecusse, with himself as the self-proclaimed Sultan. Stamps were produced for the "Sultanate". The Sultanate was the subject of a documentary film made by Barry Thomas with filming done in New Zealand and Australia. Henderson wrote a 200 page history of the utopian state with its own airline "Swift Air," a fleet of blimps as there were no roads, cars or pollution.

== Doctor Who ==
In January 1999, he came to notice for the discovery of the long missing first episode of the 1965 Doctor Who story The Crusade, discovered in a garage sale in Napier. After loaning the episode to the BBC for restoration, Henderson auctioned the film print on eBay.

== Selected publications ==
- "Voyages to Imaginary Countries" in Artistamps Francobolli D'Artista, James Warren Felter (Ed.), AAA Edizioni, Bertiolo, Italy, 2000. ISBN 978-8886828253
- Lloyd, Charles. "The 2005 South Kasai stamp issues and the activities of their colourful creator" (PDF). Dundee & District Philatelic Society. Archived from the original (PDF) on 11 November 2022.
