= Bernard Wilson (boxer) =

Grenadian boxer (born 1962)

Personal information
- Full name: Bernard Wilson
- Born: 8 April 1962 (age 64)
- Weight: 67 kg (148 lb)

Sport
- Country: Grenada
- Sport: Boxing

Bernard Wilson (born 8 April 1962) is retired male amateur boxer from Grenada, who fought at the 1984 Summer Olympics in the men's welterweight division. He was the first Olympic Flag bearer for the island at the games. He also represented Grenada at the 1987 Pan American Games and at the 1982 Central American and Caribbean Games.
