= Chris Collins (boxer) =

Grenadian boxer (born 1960)

Christopher "Chris" Collins
Personal information
- Full name: Christopher Collins
- Nickname: "Chris"
- Born: January 25, 1960 (age 66)
- Weight: 81 kg (179 lb)

Sport
- Country: Grenada
- Sport: Boxing

Christopher "Chris" Collins (born 25 January 1960) is retired male amateur boxer from Grenada who fought at the 1984 Summer Olympics in the men's Middleweight division, and later at the 1988 Summer Olympics as a Light Heavyweight. He represented Grenada at the 1987 Pan American Games.

== 1984 Olympic results ==
Below is the record of Chris Collins, a middleweight boxer from Grenada who competed at the 1984 Los Angeles Olympics:

- Round of 32: lost to Paulo Tuvale (Samoa) referee stopped contest in the first round
