= Neisha Bernard-Thomas =

Grenadian middle-distance runner (born 1981)

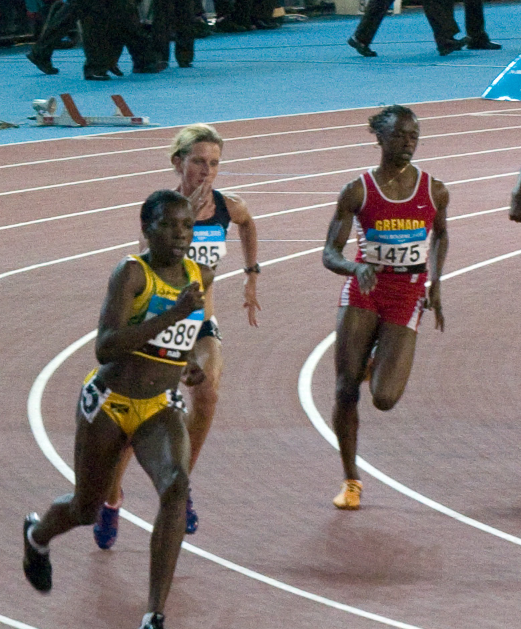
- Bernard-Thomas (right) 2006 Commonwealth Games 800 metres semi-final

Personal information
- Born: 21 January 1981 (age 45)
- Height: 1.65 m (5 ft 5 in)
- Weight: 57 kg (126 lb)

Sport
- Country: Grenada
- Sport: Athletics
- Event: 800 metres

Achievements and titles
- Personal bests: 400 metres - 53.32s 800 metres - 1:59.60 min. 1,000 metres - 2:42.71 min. 1,500 metres - 4:29.10 min.
- Updated on 22 July 2012

Neisha Bernard-Thomas (born 21 January 1981) is a Grenadian middle-distance runner who specializes in the 800 metres. She also ran collegiately at Louisiana State University (LSU).

Her personal best is 2:00.09 minutes, achieved at the 2008 Summer Olympics in Beijing. This is the Grenadian record. She also holds the 1500 metres record with 4:23.24 minutes, achieved in March 2008 in Baton Rouge.

== Competition record ==
Year	Competition	Venue	Position	Event	Notes
1997	CARIFTA Games (U17)	Bridgetown, Barbados	6th	800 m	2:25.66
1997	CARIFTA Games (U17)	Bridgetown, Barbados	7th	1500 m	5:13.83
2000	Central American and Caribbean Junior Championships (U20)	San Juan, Puerto Rico	6th	800 m	2:14.18
2000	Central American and Caribbean Junior Championships (U20)	San Juan, Puerto Rico	2nd	4 × 400 m	3:40.24
2003	Central American and Caribbean Championships	St. George's, Grenada	1st	800 m	2:04.12
2003	Central American and Caribbean Championships	St. George's, Grenada	2nd	4 × 400 m	3:32.99
2003	Pan American Games	Santo Domingo, Dominican Republic	9th (h)	800 m	2:04.22
2005	Central American and Caribbean Championships	Nassau, Bahamas	1st	800 m	2:03.56
2005	World Championships	Helsinki, Finland	23rd (h)	800 m	2:02.50
2006	Commonwealth Games	Melbourne, Australia	8th	800 m	2:01.96
2008	Olympic Games	Beijing, China	21st (sf)	800 m	2:01.84
2009	World Championships	Berlin, Germany	28th (sf)	800 m	2:04.55
2011	Central American and Caribbean Championships	Mayagüez, Puerto Rico	4th	800 m	2:03.56
2012	Olympic Games	London, United Kingdom	16th (sf)	800 m	2:00.68
