= Kimberly Ince =

Grenadian swimmer (born 2004)

Personal information
- Nationality: Grenadian
- Born: 10 October 2004 (age 21)

Sport
- Sport: Swimming

Kimberly Ince (born 10 October 2004) is a Grenadian swimmer. She competed in the women's 50 metre backstroke event at the 2018 FINA World Swimming Championships (25 m), in Hangzhou, China. She competed at the 2020 Summer Olympics.

Olympic Games
Preceded by Kirani James	Flagbearer for Grenada; Tokyo 2020 with Delron Felix	Succeeded by Tilly Collymore; Lindon Victor
