= Eugene Licorish =

Grenadian long jumper (born 1964)

Personal information
- Born: 28 November 1964 (age 61)

Sport
- Sport: Track and field
Medal record
Representing Grenada
CARIFTA Games Junior (U20)
Bronze medal – third place	1983 Fort-de-France	Long Jump

Eugene Licorish (born 28 November 1964) is a retired Grenadian long jumper.

He competed at the 1992 Olympic Games and the 1993 World Championships, but without reaching the final round.

His personal best jump is 8.09 metres, achieved in May 1989 in Port of Spain, which is the Grenadian record.

== Links ==
- Eugene Licorish at World Athletics
- Eugene Licorish at Olympics.com
- Eugene Licorish at Olympedia
- Eugene Licorish at InterSportStats
