= Kanika Beckles =

Trinidadian-born Grenadian sprinter

Personal information
- Born: October 3, 1991 (age 34) St. Joseph, Trinidad and Tobago
- Height: 1.72 m (5 ft 8 in)
- Weight: 59 kg (130 lb)

Sport
- Country: Grenada
- Sport: Athletics
- Event(s): 400m, 200m
Medal record
Women's athletics
Representing Grenada
CARIFTA Games(U20)
Bronze medal – third place	2010 Cayman Islands	400 m
OECS Track and Field Championships
Bronze medal – third place	2016 Tortola	400m
Silver medal – second place	2016 Tortola	4x400m
Silver medal – second place	2017 Grenada	400m
Silver medal – second place	2017 Grenada	4x400m

Kanika Alana Beckles (born 3 October 1991, in Saint Joseph) is a Trinidadian-born Grenadian sprinter who specializes in the 400 metres. She represented Grenada at the 2012 Summer Olympics but did not start. She reached the semifinals of the 2014 Commonwealth Games, after missing large parts of the 2012 and 2013 seasons with a torn hamstring and ACL surgery. At the 2016 Summer Olympics she represented Grenada but placed fifth in her heat with a time 52.41 Seconds (a season's best) and with an overall ranking of 32nd. She did not advance to the semifinals.

== Competition record ==
Year	Competition	Venue	Position	Event	Notes
Representing Grenada
2010	CARIFTA Games	George Town, Cayman Islands	3rd	400 m (U20)	54.04
2011
2011	2011 Pan American Games	Guadalajara, Mexico	7th (h)	400m	56.43s
2015
2015	2015 Pan American Games	Toronto, Canada	8th (s/f)	200m	28.14
2016
2016	Trinidad & Tobago National Championships	Port of Spain, Trinidad and Tobago	2nd	400m	52.61s
2016	OECS Track and Field Championships	Tortola, British Virgin Islands	4th	200m	23.78s (0.2 m/s)
2016	OECS Track and Field Championships	Tortola, British Virgin Islands	3rd	400m	53.37s
2016	OECS Track and Field Championships	Tortola, British Virgin Islands	2nd	4 × 400 m relay	3:41.75
2016	2016 Rio Summer Olympics	Rio de Janeiro, Brazil	32nd (h)	400m	52.41s
2017	OECS Track and Field Championships	Kirani James Athletic Stadium, Grenada	2nd	400m	53.90
2017	OECS Track and Field Championships	Kirani James Athletic Stadium, Grenada	2nd	4 × 400 m RELAY	3:37.48
2018	Commonwealth Games	Gold Coast, Australia	6th sf	400m	53.80
2018	Central American and Caribbean Games	Barranquilla, Colombia	4th	400m	53.75
