= Delron Felix =

Grenadian swimmer (born 2000)

Personal information
- Nationality: Grenadian
- Born: 20 October 2000 (age 25)

Sport
- Sport: Swimming

Delron Felix (born 20 October 2000) is a Grenadian swimmer. He competed in the men's 100 metre freestyle at the 2020 Summer Olympics.

Olympic Games
Preceded by Kirani James	Flagbearer for Grenada; Tokyo 2020 with Kimberly Ince	Succeeded by Tilly Collymore; Lindon Victor
