= Lindon Victor =

Grenadian athletics competitor

Lindon Victor OBE
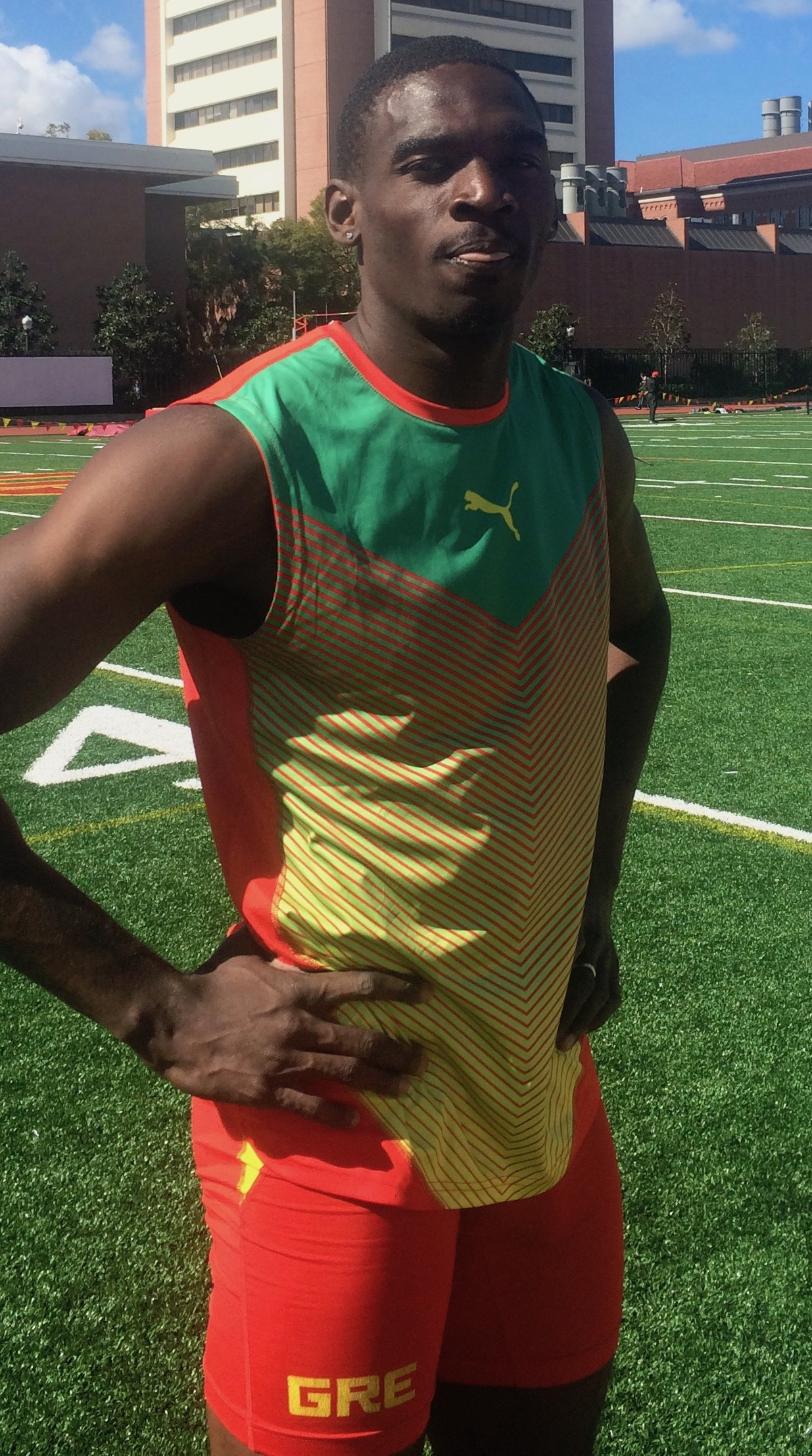
- Victor in 2018

Personal information
- Born: 28 February 1993 (age 33) St. George's, Grenada
- Height: 1.85 m (6 ft 1 in)

Sport
- Country: Grenada
- Sport: Athletics
- Event: Combined events
- University team: Texas A&M Aggies

Achievements and titles
- Personal bests: Decathlon: 8,756 (2023) NR; Heptathlon: 6,029 (2022)
Medal record
Men's athletics
Representing Grenada
Olympic Games
Bronze medal – third place	2024 Paris	Decathlon
World Championships
Bronze medal – third place	2023 Budapest	Decathlon
Commonwealth Games
Gold medal – first place	2018 Gold Coast	Decathlon
Gold medal – first place	2022 Birmingham	Decathlon
Gold medal – first place	2026 Glasgow	Decathlon
Pan American Games
Silver medal – second place	2019 Lima	Decathlon
CARIFTA Games (U17)
Silver medal – second place	2009 Vieux Fort	Discus throw
Bronze medal – third place	2009 Vieux Fort	Shot put
CARIFTA Games (U20)
Bronze medal – third place	2010 George Town	Heptathlon
Bronze medal – third place	2011 Montego Bay	Heptathlon
Gold medal – first place	2012 Hamilton	Heptathlon

Lindon Victor OBE (born 28 February 1993) is a Grenadian athlete who competes in the decathlon. He is the 2023 World and 2024 Olympic bronze medalist and a three-time Commonwealth Games champion (2018–2026).

== Career ==
Victor began his college career at Benedictine College in Atchison, Kansas, later transferring to Texas A&M University. In 2016, he scored 8446 points with nine personal bests at the Southeastern Conference Championship decathlon, breaking both the SEC record and the Grenadian National Record, the latter of which was set by his brother, Kurt Felix, at the 2015 IAAF World Championships. Victor was named 2016 SEC Field Athlete of the Year.

Victor qualified for and represented Grenada at the 2016 Summer Olympics in Rio de Janeiro, Brazil, in the decathlon. He placed sixteenth with a score of 7998 points. Victor was the flag bearer for Grenada for the closing of the games. In that same year, he was credited as having the second-best discus throw in decathlon history and the best discus throw in NCAA decathlon history.

Lindon started his 2017 season with indoor events. He improved his personal best performances in the (indoor) 60 meter sprint, High Jump, Shot Put, Pole Vault and 1000 Meter run. He also set a personal best in the Heptathlon indoor with an overall score of 5976, this was 10 points shy of the national record held by Kurt Felix. On 29 March 2017, Lindon set the highest collegiate first day score in the decathlon with a total of 4,516 points in Texas Relays decathlon. On the next day Victor completed with a score of 8472. This was not only yet another National and OECS Record for Victor, but it was also a new Collegiate Outdoor Decathlon Record, erasing the old mark of 8465, which was set by Trey Hardee, in 2006. On 11–12 May, Lindon remarked on the defense of his SEC Champions Decathlon title and was successful in the defense and bettered the National Record in the Pole Vault. He was also able to improve on his Collegiate record with a new mark of 8539 points. He was subsequently named the SEC Men's Field athlete of the year for the second year in a row.

The end of 2017 found Lindon being among the final three nominees for that year's Bowerman Award, which is an annual track and field award that is the highest accolade given to the year's best student-athlete in American collegiate track and field. He eventually lost out to American Sprinter Christian Coleman.

On 5 January 2018, at the National Sports Awards, Lindon was named 2017 Sportsman of the Year.

Victor was competing at his second major international meet since graduating from Texas A&M, where he set an all-time collegiate record with 8,539 points and was a two-time NCAA Division I decathlon champion – Victor won the decathlon to earn a gold medal for Grenada scoring 8,303 points. On 30 April, during Texas A&M Athletics' fifth-annual Building Champions Awards gala held in the Hall of Champions at Kyle Field. Athlete of the Year honor(male) was awarded to Lindon.

Victor was appointed Officer of the Order of the British Empire (OBE) in the 2024 New Year Honours for services to sports.

== Personal bests ==
Information from World Athletics profile unless otherwise noted.

Outdoor

As of 29 October 2025

Individual events
Event	Performance	Location	Date	Ref.
Long jump	7.24 m (23 ft 9 in) (+0.4 m/s)	St. George's	25 June 2016	
High jump	1.98 m (6 ft 5 3/4 in)	St. George's	25 June 2016	
Pole vault	4.80 m (15 ft 8 3/4 in)	Santa Barbara	30 January 2021	
100 metres	10.91 (+0.3 m/s)	Beaverton	3 May 2019	
200 metres	22.91	Baldwin City	5 April 2014	
400 metres	49.04	Baton Rouge	30 April 2016	
110 metres hurdles	14.64 (+1.2 m/s)	Long Beach	7 March 2020	
Shot put	16.27 m (53 ft 4 1/2 in)	Santa Barbara	30 January 2021	
Discus throw	55.87 m (183 ft 3 1/2 in)	Azusa	18 April 2019	
Javelin throw	71.23 m (233 ft 8 1/4 in)	Emporia	29 March 2014	

Combined events
Event	Performance	Location	Date	Score
Decathlon	—N/a	Budapest	25–26 August 2023	8,756 points
100 metres	10.48 (+1.3 m/s)	Götzis	18 May 2024	980 points
Long jump	7.73 m (25 ft 4 1/4 in) (+1.4 m/s)	Götzis	18 May 2024	992 points
Shot put	16.52 m (54 ft 2 1/4 in)	Austin	29 March 2017	883 points
High jump	2.09 m (6 ft 10 1/4 in)	Austin	29 March 2017	887 points
400 metres	48.05	Wetzlar	20 July 2024	907 points
110 meters hurdles	14.45 (+1.8 m/s)	Columbia	12 May 2017	917 points
Discus throw	55.22 m (181 ft 2 in)	Columbia	12 May 2017	980 points
Pole vault	4.92 m (16 ft 1 1/2 in)	Chula Vista	25 April 2021	886 points
Javelin throw	71.56 m (234 ft 9 1/4 in)	Tokyo	5 August 2021	913 points
1500 metres	4:39.67	Budapest	26 August 2023	682 points
Virtual Best Performance				9,027 points

Indoor

As of 29 October 2025

Individual events
Event	Performance	Location	Date
Long jump	7.38 m (24 ft 2 1/2 in)	College Station	17 February 2018
High jump	1.90 m (6 ft 2 3/4 in)	College Station	23 January 2016
Pole vault	4.57 m (14 ft 11 3/4 in)	Seattle	26 January 2019
55 metres	6.64	Highland	15 February 2014
60 metres	7.11	Warrensburg	8 February 2014
60 metres hurdles	8.31	College Station	17 February 2018
Shot put	15.24 m (50 ft 0 in)	Clemson	11 February 2017

Combined events
Event	Performance	Location	Date	Score
Heptathlon	—N/a	Belgrade	18–19 March 2022	6,029 points
60 metres	6.91	Belgrade	18 March 2022	915 points
Long jump	7.56 m (24 ft 9 1/2 in)	Belgrade	18 March 2022	950 points
Shot put	16.55 m (54 ft 3 1/2 in)	College Station	10 March 2017	885 points
High jump	2.07 m (6 ft 9 1/4 in)	College Station	10 March 2017	868 points
60 metres hurdles	8.24	Fayetteville	27 February 2016	922 points
Pole vault	4.76 m (15 ft 7 1/4 in)	College Station	11 March 2017	837 points
1000 metres	2:48.21	Belgrade	19 March 2022	784 points
Virtual Best Performance				6,161 points

== Competition record ==
Year	Competition	Venue	Position	Event	Notes
Representing Grenada
2009	CARIFTA Games	Vieux Fort	3rd	Shot put	13.90 m
2009	CARIFTA Games	Vieux Fort	2nd	Discus throw	45.27 m
2010	CARIFTA Games	George Town	3rd	Heptathlon	4,234 pts
2010	Summer Youth Olympics	Singapore	13th	Javelin throw	51.61 m
2011	CARIFTA Games	Montego Bay	3rd	Heptathlon	4,544 pts
2012	CARIFTA Games	Hamilton	1st	Heptathlon	4,572 pts
2014	NACAC Under-23 Championships	British Columbia	6th	Javelin throw	65.28 m
2015	Pan American Games	Toronto	7th	Decathlon	7,453 pts
2016	OECS Track & Field Championships	Tortola	10th	Long jump	6.51 m
2016	OECS Track & Field Championships	Tortola	3rd	Shot put	14.73 m
2016	OECS Track & Field Championships	Tortola	2nd	Discus throw	48.50 m
2016	Olympic Games	Rio de Janeiro	16th	Decathlon	7,998 pts
2017	World Championships	London	–	Decathlon	DNF
2018	World Indoor Championships	Birmingham	DNF	Heptathlon	DNF
2018	Commonwealth Games	Gold Coast	1st	Decathlon	8,303 pts
2019	Pan American Games	Lima	2nd	Decathlon	8,240 pts
2019	World Championships	Doha	–	Decathlon	DNF
2021	Olympic Games	Tokyo	7th	Decathlon	8,414 pts
2022	World Indoor Championships	Belgrade	–	Heptathlon	DNF
2022	World Championships	Eugene	5th	Decathlon	8,474 pts
2022	Commonwealth Games	Birmingham	1st	Decathlon	8,233 pts
2023	World Championships	Budapest	3rd	Decathlon	8,756 pts
2024	Olympic Games	Paris	3rd	Decathlon	8,711 pts
2025	World Championships	Tokyo, Japan	–	Decathlon	DNF
2026	Commonwealth Games	Glasgow, United Kingdom	1st	Decathlon	8,096 pts

Olympic Games
Preceded by Delron Felix; Kimberly Ince	Flagbearer for Grenada; Paris 2024 with Tilly Collymore	Succeeded by Incumbent
