= Esau Simpson =

Grenadian swimmer (born 1990)

Personal information
- Born: October 6, 1990 (age 35) Brooklyn, United States

Sport
- Sport: Swimming

Esau Walter Simpson (born 6 October 1990) is a Grenadian swimmer. At the 2012 Summer Olympics, he competed in the Men's 100 metre freestyle, finishing in 43rd place overall in the heats, failing to qualify for the semifinals. He also competed in the 100 m event at the 2013 World Aquatics Championships. Born in Brooklyn, he competed at the collegiate level for the NCAA Division II Nova Southeastern University Sharks.
