= OECS Track and Field Championships =

Annual track and field competition

- Inaugurated: 1986
- Most recent: 2017
- Organiser: Organisation of Eastern Caribbean States

The OECS Track and Field Championships was an annual track and field competition between athletes representing one of the member states of the Organisation of Eastern Caribbean States (OECS). This event started in 1986 and was first held at Queen's Park, in Grenada. The second was also held in Grenada and thereafter moved around the OECS until 1992. Under the auspices of the OECS Athletics Congress (OAC) the first edition of the revived OECS Track and Field Championships was held in St. Kitts in 2014.

== Editions ==
Edition	Year	City	Country	Dates	Venue	No. of events	No. of athletes	Winner
—	1986	St. George's	Grenada		Queen's Park			
—	1987	St. George's	Grenada		Queen's Park			
—	1988							
—	1989							
—	1990							
—	1991							
—	1992							
I	2014	Basseterre	Saint Kitts and Nevis	July 2014				British Virgin Islands
II	2016	Road Town	British Virgin Islands	2–3 July 2016	A.O. Shirley Recreation Ground			British Virgin Islands
III	2017	St. George's	Grenada	1–2 July 2017	Kirani James Athletic Stadium			British Virgin Islands

== Championships records ==
=== Men ===
Event	Record	Athlete	Nationality	Date	Meet	Place	Ref.
1500 m	3:53.90	Edgar Marbeq	Saint Lucia	3 July 2016	2016 Championships	Road Town, British Virgin Islands	
Javelin throw	84.81 m	Anderson Peters	Grenada	2 July 2017	2017 Championships	St. George's, Grenada	

=== Women ===
Event	Record	Athlete	Nationality	Date	Meet	Place	Ref.
400 m	52.29	Ashley Kelly	British Virgin Islands	2 July 2016	2016 Championships	Road Town, British Virgin Islands	
4 × 100 m relay	43.43	Beatriz Cruz; Celiangeli Morales; Ginoiska Cancel; Carol Rodriguez	Puerto Rico	2 July 2016	2016 Championships	Road Town, British Virgin Islands	
