= Grenada at the 2011 World Aquatics Championships =

Sporting event delegation

Flag of Grenada

Grenada competed at the 2011 World Aquatics Championships in Shanghai, China between July 16 and 31, 2011.

== Swimming ==
Grenada qualified 2 swimmers.

Men

Athlete	Event	Heats		Semifinals		Final	
Athlete	Event	Time	Rank	Time	Rank	Time	Rank
Esau Simpson	Men's 50m Freestyle	24.72	60	did not advance			
Esau Simpson	Men's 100m Freestyle	53.85	68	did not advance			
Nicholas Coard	Men's 50m Freestyle	24.78	61	did not advance			
Nicholas Coard	Men's 100m Freestyle	53.94	70	did not advance			
