= Kirani James =

Grenadian sprinter (born 1992)

Sir Kirani James GCNG CBE COG
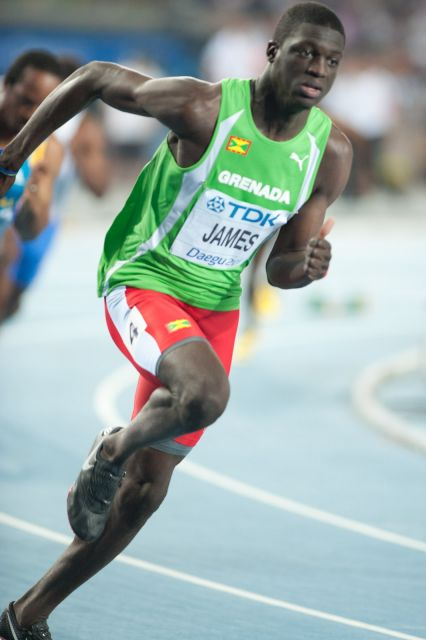
- James at the 2011 World Championships in Athletics

Personal information
- Nationality: Grenadian
- Born: 1 September 1992 (age 34) Gouyave, Saint John, Grenada
- Height: 1.91 m (6 ft 3 in)
- Weight: 80 kg (176 lb)

Sport
- Sport: Track and field
- Event: Sprinting
- College team: Alabama Crimson Tide

Achievements and titles
- Olympic finals: 2012 London; 400 m, Gold; 2016 Rio de Janeiro; 400 m, Silver; 2020 Tokyo; 400 m, Bronze
- World finals: 2011 Daegu; 400 m, Gold; 2013 Moscow; 400 m, 7th; 2015 Beijing; 400 m, Bronze; 2019 Doha; 400 m, 5th; 2022 Eugene; 400 m, Silver
- Highest world ranking: 1 (weeks 54)
- Personal bests: Outdoor; 200 m: 20.41 NR (El Paso 2011); 400 m: 43.74 NR (Lausanne 2014); Indoor; 200 m: 20.58i NR (Albuquerque 2011); 400 m: 44.80i NR (Fayetteville, AR 2011)
Medal record
Men's athletics
Representing Grenada
Olympic Games
Gold medal – first place	2012 London	400 m
Silver medal – second place	2016 Rio de Janeiro	400 m
Bronze medal – third place	2020 Tokyo	400 m
World Championships
Gold medal – first place	2011 Daegu	400 m
Silver medal – second place	2022 Eugene	400 m
Bronze medal – third place	2015 Beijing	400 m
Diamond League
First place	2022	400 m
First place	2023	400 m
Commonwealth Games
Gold medal – first place	2014 Glasgow	400 m
NACAC Championships
Gold medal – first place	2025 Freeport	400 m
World Junior Championships
Gold medal – first place	2010 Moncton	400 m
Silver medal – second place	2008 Bydgoszcz	400 m
Pan American Junior Championships
Gold medal – first place	2011 Miramar	200 m
Gold medal – first place	2009 Port of Spain	400 m
CARIFTA Games (U-20)
Gold medal – first place	2010 Georgetown	400 m
Gold medal – first place	2010 Georgetown	200 m
Gold medal – first place	2009 Vieux Fort	400 m
Bronze medal – third place	2009 Vieux Fort	4 × 400 m relay
World Youth Championships
Gold medal – first place	2009 Brixen	200 m
Gold medal – first place	2009 Brixen	400 m
Silver medal – second place	2007 Ostrava	400 m
Commonwealth Youth Games
Gold medal – first place	2008 Pune	400 m
CARIFTA Games (U-17)
Gold medal – first place	2009 Basseterre	400 m
Gold medal – first place	2007 Providenciales	400 m
Silver medal – second place	2009 Basseterre	200 m

Sir Kirani Zeno James GCNG CBE COG (born 1 September 1992) is a Grenadian professional sprinter who specializes in the 400 metres. He won the 400 m at the World Championships in 2011 and won the gold medal at the 2012 London Olympics. In the 400 metres, James also won the silver medal at the 2016 Rio Olympics and a bronze medal at the 2020 Tokyo Olympics, thus becoming the first man to earn the full set of three medals in the centennial history of the event. He is Grenada's first Olympic medalist. He holds the Grenadian national record in both the 200 metres and 400 metres.

As a junior, James also specialized in the 200 metres. Prodigious from a young age, he ran the fastest 400 m times ever by a 14-year-old and a 15-year-old. He won a series of gold medals at the CARIFTA Games and the Commonwealth Youth Games and rose on the international stage with 400 m silver medals at the 2007 World Youth and 2008 World Junior Championships. James became the first athlete to run a 200/400 double at the 2009 World Youth Championships and was the 2010 World Junior Champion.

James received an athletic scholarship at the University of Alabama and won back-to-back NCAA Outdoor Championship titles in his first two years. He is the third fastest of all-time indoors (44.80 seconds) and ran a personal best of 43.74 at a 2014 Diamond League event in Lausanne. James is one of only eleven athletes (along with Valerie Adams, Usain Bolt, Veronica Campbell Brown, Armand Duplantis, Jacques Freitag, Yelena Isinbayeva, Faith Kipyegon, Jana Pittman, Dani Samuels, and David Storl) to win World Championship titles at the youth, junior, and senior levels of an athletic event.

== Career ==
=== Youth career ===
Kirani James attended the Grenada Boys' Secondary School at age 12. He has always been considered a promising athlete since he first arrived at the scenes in the 400 and 200 m in the Intercol games. At the age of 14 James won the gold medal in the 400 m at the 2007 CARIFTA Games in the under 17 category with a time of 47.86 seconds. He went on to win silver medals at the 2007 World Youth Championships with a time of 46.96 s, a time which is the fastest run by a 14-year-old.

In April 2008, he defended his CARIFTA 400 m title, winning the 200 metres with a time of 21.38 s. In July of that year, he won a silver medal at the 2008 World Junior Championships with a time of 45.70 s, which was his personal best, and a national youth and junior record. In October, he won the gold medal at the 2008 Commonwealth Youth Games with a new games record of 46.66 s.

James made his third CARIFTA Games appearance in 2009 and, in his under-20 debut, he defeated the defending 400 m champion and fellow Grenadian Rondell Bartholomew to win in a personal best of 45.45 s. This easily set a new championship record, beating Usain Bolt's six-year-old mark of 46.35 s. In consequence, he was awarded the Austin Sealy Trophy for the most outstanding athlete of the games.

James became the first youth athlete to complete a 200/400 metres double gold at the 2009 World Youth Championships in Athletics. Noting that he would be a junior athlete for a further two years, he focused on upcoming events, pinpointing the 2010 World Junior Championships in Athletics and the 2012 Summer Olympics as future goals. Following this, he won the 400 m at the 2009 Pan American Junior Championships. He was declared the 2009 Grenada Sportsman of the Year.

=== College athletics ===
At least ten colleges in the United States had expressed strong interest in recruiting James for their track team, including Baylor, Alabama, South Carolina, Florida State, and Arizona State. He accepted a scholarship offer from Alabama and in his first-ever appearance on an indoor track he ran a 45.79 in the 400 meters, placing first and breaking the 10-year-old school record of 46.46 held by Cori Loving.

James ran a new indoor personal best of 20.94 in the 200 m dash at the Texas A&M Challenge at Gilliam Indoor Track Stadium in College Station, Texas on 13 February 2010. He was runner-up at the NCAA Indoor Championships, finishing behind Torrin Lawrence. James lowered his 400 m personal best to 45.02 s at the 2010 CARIFTA Games, where he took a 200/400 m double, and improved further to 45.01 in winning the SEC Championships 400 m title. He claimed the gold medal over 400 m at the 2010 World Junior Championships in Athletics, but stated he was only running for times and was not satisfied with his winning performance of 45.89 seconds. He won the NCAA Outdoor Championship title in his first year of collegiate competition.

James moved up to third on the all-time indoor lists in February 2011, recording 44.80 seconds to win at the SEC Indoor Championships. This left only Michael Johnson and Kerron Clement as the faster athletes indoors, and also bettered LaShawn Merritt's previous world best junior time of 44.93 seconds. He failed to reach the podium at the NCAA Indoor meet as he clashed with another athlete and fell mid-race. He managed to repeat as the collegiate champion outdoors, however, as he edged ahead of Gil Roberts by one-hundredth of a second. After the end of the college season, he made his professional debut at the London Grand Prix Diamond League meeting and established himself among the world's best with a personal best run of 44.61 seconds – a time which made him the fastest man that year.

=== Professional career ===
At the 2011 World Championships in Daegu, South Korea, both James and fellow Grenadian runner Rondell Bartholomew made the finals of the 400 metres event. James won the event in a personal best of 44.60 seconds, becoming the youngest 400 metres world champion at the age of 18. The medal was the first for Grenada in any event at the World Championships in Athletics. Nine days later, James won the 400 metres at the 2011 IAAF Diamond League meet in Zürich with a new personal best of 44.36 seconds.

At the London 2012 Olympics, James won the second 400 metres semi-final, achieving a season-best of 44.59 seconds. At the end of the race, James exchanged name tags with double-amputee runner Oscar Pistorius as a sign of respect for him.

On 6 August 2012, James won the 400 metres Olympic gold in a time of 43.94, a national record, earning Grenada its first-ever Olympic medal and becoming the first non-US runner to break the 44-second mark. World record holder Michael Johnson said, following the race, that James stood a chance of beating his record if he was able to deal with the remaining flaws in his technique. James described his win as "a huge step for our country in terms of stepping up to the plate in track and field, just going out there and putting us on the map".

His domestic reception proved to be a euphoric one. Thousands lined the streets in preparation of his return, and he was greeted with an emphatic and vociferous national pride. Also upon his arrival the Prime Minister, Keith Mitchell announced Mr. James would be bequeathed government bonds totaling up to EC500,000, a commemorative stamp be crafted in his honor, a new stadium be named for him, and that he would be appointed a tourism ambassador.

In December 2012, James and Jamaica's Usain Bolt were named co-sportsmen of the year by Caribbean Journal.

On 3 July 2014, at the Athletissima meet in Lausanne, Switzerland, he improved his personal best to 43.74, equaling the fifth fastest time in history, and the fastest by a non-U.S.A. athlete.

On 17 November 2014, James and Jamaica's Kaliese Spencer were named the sportsman and sportswoman of the year respectively by the Caribbean Sports Journalists' Association.

At the 2015 World Championships, James won a bronze medal in the first World Championship 400 metres race, in which three men broke 44 seconds.

At the Rio 2016 Olympics, he won the silver medal in the 400 metres in a time of 43.76, behind Wayde van Niekerk's world record 43.03. The following year, James raced sparingly and was diagnosed with Graves' disease.

At the 2020 Tokyo Olympics, Kirani James earned a bronze medal in the Men's 400 m finals, finishing 3rd behind Colombia's Anthony Zambrano (Silver) and Steven Gardiner of The Bahamas (Gold). In doing so, he denied U.S.A. favorite Michael Norman a place on the podium.

== Honours ==
He was appointed Commander of the Order of the British Empire (CBE) in the 2022 New Year Honours for services to Sport. In 2024, following the end of Paris summer Olympics, he was appointed a Companion of the Order of Grenada (COG).

In 2025 James was conferred with an honorary Doctor of Laws degree by the University of the West Indies. He was subsequently knighted to mark Grenada's 51st independence anniversary, being made a Knight Grand Cross of the Order of the Nation (GCNG).

In July 2026 the Eastern Caribbean Central Bank announced that James would feature on the new 5 dollar banknote alongside Robert Milton Cato. He was the only living person to be featured across the issue of banknotes.

== Statistics ==
=== Personal bests ===
Event	Time	Competition	Venue	Date	Notes	References
200 metres	20.41	UTEP Invitational	El Paso, United States	16 April 2011	A NR	
200 metres	20.58	Cherry & Silver Invitational	Albuquerque, United States	21 January 2011	i A NR	
400 metres	43.74	Athletissima	Lausanne, Switzerland	3 July 2014	WL NR	
400 metres	44.80	SEC Championships	Fayetteville, United States	27 February 2011	i WJR WL NR	
4 × 400 metres relay	3:04.27	CAC Championships	Mayagüez, Puerto Rico	17 July 2011	NR	

=== International competitions ===
Year	Competition	Venue	Position	Event	Notes
Representing Grenada
2007	CARIFTA Games (U-17)	Providenciales, Turks and Caicos Islands	6th	200 m	22.10 (+1.2 m/s)
2007	CARIFTA Games (U-17)	Providenciales, Turks and Caicos Islands	1st	400 m	47.86 PB
2007	World Youth Championships	Ostrava, Czech Republic	2nd	400 m	46.96 PB
2008	CARIFTA Games (U-17)	Basseterre, Saint Kitts and Nevis	1st	200 m	21.38 (+2.0 m/s)
2008	CARIFTA Games (U-17)	Basseterre, Saint Kitts and Nevis	1st	400 m	47.87
2008	World Junior Championships	Bydgoszcz, Poland	2nd	400 m	45.70 PB
2008	Commonwealth Youth Games	Pune, India	1st	400 m	46.66 GR
2009	CARIFTA Games (U-20)	Vieux Fort, Saint Lucia	DQ (h1)	200 m	False start
2009	CARIFTA Games (U-20)	Vieux Fort, Saint Lucia	1st	400 m	45.45 PB GR
2009	CARIFTA Games (U-20)	Vieux Fort, Saint Lucia	DQ (h1)	4 × 100 m relay	Out of zone
2009	CARIFTA Games (U-20)	Vieux Fort, Saint Lucia	3rd	4 × 400 m relay	3:11.93 PB
2009	World Youth Championships	Brixen, Italy	1st	200 m	21.05 (−0.9 m/s) PB
2009	World Youth Championships	Brixen, Italy	1st	400 m	45.24 PB CR
2009	Pan American Junior Championships	Port of Spain, Trinidad and Tobago	1st	400 m	45.43
2009	Pan American Junior Championships	Port of Spain, Trinidad and Tobago	5th	4 × 400 m relay	3:11.91 PB
2010	CARIFTA Games (U-20)	George Town, Cayman Islands	1st	200 m	20.76 (+0.8 m/s) SB
2010	CARIFTA Games (U-20)	George Town, Cayman Islands	1st	400 m	45.02 PB GR
2010	World Junior Championships	Moncton, Canada	1st	400 m	45.89
2011	CAC Championships	Mayagüez, Puerto Rico	5th	4 × 400 m relay	3:04.27 NR PB
2011	Pan American Junior Championships	Miramar, Florida	1st	200 m	20.53 w (+2.2 m/s)
2011	World Championships	Daegu, South Korea	1st	400 m	44.60 PB
2012	World Indoor Championships	Istanbul, Turkey	6th	400 m	46.21
2012	Olympic Games	London, England	1st	400 m	43.94 WL NR PB
2013	World Championships	Moscow, Russia	7th	400 m	44.99
2014	Commonwealth Games	Glasgow, Scotland	1st	400 m	44.24 GR
2015	World Championships	Beijing, China	3rd	400 m	43.78 SB
2016	Olympic Games	Rio de Janeiro, Brazil	2nd	400 m	43.76 SB
2019	World Championships	Doha, Qatar	5th	400 m	44.54
2021	Olympic Games	Tokyo, Japan	3rd	400 m	44.19
2022	World Championships	Eugene, United States	2nd	400 m	44.48
2023	World Championships	Budapest, Hungary	5th (sf)	400 m	44.58^{1}
2024	Olympic Games	Paris, France	5th	400 m	43.87
2025	NACAC Championships	Freeport, Bahamas	1st	400 m	44.48
2025	World Championships	Tokyo, Japan	19th (sf)	400 m	44.97
2026	Central American and Caribbean Games	Santo Domingo, Dominican Republic	4th	400 m	45.32

^{1}Disqualified in the final

=== Circuit wins ===
400 metres

- Diamond League: 2011, 2015, 2022
  - London Grand Prix: 2011, 2012, 2013
  - Weltklasse Zürich: 2011, 2022
  - Athletissima: 2012, 2014
  - Shanghai Golden Grand Prix: 2013, 2015
  - Meeting de Paris: 2013
  - Prefontaine Classic: 2014, 2015, 2016
  - Birmingham Grand Prix: 2014, 2016
  - BAUHAUS-galan: 2021

== Legacy ==
Kirani's athletic accomplishments have inspired many Grenadians and led to many objects on the island being named after him, including Kirani James Athletic Stadium and Kirani James Boulevard, both of which are located in the parish of St. George.

Olympic Games
Preceded by Alleyne Francique	Flagbearer for Grenada; London 2012; Rio de Janeiro 2016	Succeeded by Kimberly Ince; Delron Felix
