= Grenada Olympic Committee =

National Olympic Committee of Grenada

- Country: Grenada
- [[|]]
- Code: GRN
- Created: 1984
- Recognized: 1984
- Continental Association: PASO
- President: Royston La Hee
- Secretary General: Veda Bruno-Victor
- Website: gocgrenada.com

The Grenada Olympic Committee (IOC code: GRN) is the National Olympic Committee representing Grenada.

== See also ==
- Grenada at the Olympics
- Grenada at the Commonwealth Games
