= Saint Lucia at the 2027 Pan American Games =

- IOC code: LCA
- NOC: Saint Lucia Olympic Committee

in Lima, Peru 2027 – 2027
- Competitors: 1 in 1 sport
- Medals: Gold 0 Silver 0 Bronze 0 Total 0

Pan American Games appearances (overview)
- 1995; 1999; 2003; 2007; 2011; 2015; 2019; 2023

Saint Lucia is scheduled to compete at the 2027 Pan American Games in Lima, Peru from July 23 to August 8, 2027. This will be Saint Lucia's 9th appearance at the Pan American Games, having competed at every edition of the Games since 1995.

== Competitors ==
The following is the list of number of competitors (per gender) participating at the games per sport/discipline.

| Sport | Men | Women | Total |
|---|---|---|---|
| Sailing | 1 | 0 | 1 |
| Total | 1 | 0 | 1 |

== Sailing ==
Saint Lucia has qualified 1 boat for a total of 1 sailor.

Men

| Athlete | Event | Opening series | | | | | | | | | | | | | | | | | | Finals | | | | |
| Athlete | Event | 1 | 2 | 3 | 4 | 5 | 6 | 7 | 8 | 9 | 10 | 11 | 12 | 13 | 14 | 15 | 16 | Points | Rank | QF | SF | M / F | Points | Rank |
|---|---|---|---|---|---|---|---|---|---|---|---|---|---|---|---|---|---|---|---|---|---|---|---|---|
| | ILCA 7 | | | | | | | | | | | —N/a | | | | | | | | —N/a | | | | |
