= Sailing at the 2027 Pan American Games – Qualification =

The following is the qualification system and summary of the sailing at the 2027 Pan American Games competition.

== Qualification system ==
A total of 189 sailors (89 men and 100 women) will qualify to compete at the games. A nation may enter a maximum of one boat in each of the 14 events and a maximum of 21 athletes (ten men and eleven women). Each event had different qualifying events that began in 2025. The host nation (Peru) automatically qualified in all 14 events (21 athletes). More women will qualify to compete for the second time, after the lightning class maintained a two women and one man format for each boat. The winner of each sailing event at the 2025 Junior Pan American Games, directly qualified as well. Countries earning a spot at the 2025 Junior Pan American Games, can earn another boat in that respective event. The slot awarded at the games is to the athlete, and cannot be transferred to another athlete. A total of four universality quotas were available (two each in the laser and laser radial events).

Original allocation

Event	Host NOC	Cali 2021	Other NOC's	Boats	Athletes
IQFoil men	1	1	7	9	9
Kites men	1	1	7	9	9
ILCA 7 men	1	1	15	17	17
49er men	1	—N/a	7	8	16
Sunfish men	1	—N/a	7	8	8
IQFoil women	1	1	7	9	9
Kites women	1	—N/a	7	8	8
ILCA 6 women	1	1	15	17	17
49er women	1	—N/a	7	8	16
Sunfish women	1	—N/a	7	8	8
470 mixed	1	—N/a	7	8	16
Nacra 17 mixed	1	—N/a	7	8	16
Snipe mixed	1	—N/a	7	8	16
Lightning mixed	1	—N/a	7	8	24
TOTAL	14	4	107	133	189

== Qualification summary ==
A total of 18 countries qualified boats. The qualification summary is as of October 18, 2026.

Nation	Men					Women					Mixed				Total	
Nation	IQFoil	Kites	ILCA 7	49er	Sunfish	IQFoil	Kites	ILCA 6	49erFX	Sunfish	470	Nacra 17	Snipe	Lightning	Boats	Athletes
Argentina	X	X	X	X		X	X	X	X			X		X	10	15
Aruba	X					X									2	2
Bahamas								X							1	1
Bermuda			X					X							2	2
Brazil	X	X	X					X					X	X	6	9
Canada		X	X	X			X	X	X		X	X		X	9	15
Cayman Islands								X							1	1
Chile			X					X						X	3	5
Colombia					X									X	2	4
Ecuador										X				X	2	4
Guatemala					X					X					2	2
Mexico	X	X	X	X		X		X							6	7
Peru	X	X	X	X	X	X	X	X	X	X	X	X	X	X	14	21
Puerto Rico			X	X	X	X		X	X		X		X		8	12
Saint Lucia			X												1	1
Trinidad and Tobago										X					1	1
United States	XX	X	XX	X		X	X	X	X		X	X		X	13	19
Uruguay				X		X									2	3
Total: 18 NOCs	9	9	17	8	8	9	8	17	8	8	8	8	8	8	133	189

== Qualified boats ==
=== IQFoil men ===
Event	Location	Date	Boats	Qualified
Host nation	—N/a	—N/a	1	Peru
2025 Junior Pan American Games	(Paraguay) Asunción	August 15–17	1	Makani Andrews (USA)
2026 Long Beach Olympic Classes Regatta	(United States) Long Beach	July 13–16	2	United States; Brazil
2026 Central American and Caribbean Games	(Dominican Republic) Santo Domingo	August 1–8	1	Mexico
2026 South American Championship	(Peru) Paracas	August 12–16	1	Argentina
2026 South American Games	(Argentina) Rosario	September 12–26	1	Aruba
2027 World Sailing Championships	(Brazil) Fortaleza	January 15–23	2	
TOTAL			9	

=== Kites men ===
Event	Location	Date	Boats	Qualified
Host nation	—N/a	—N/a	1	Peru
2025 Junior Pan American Games	(Paraguay) Asunción	August 15–17	1	Lucas Fonseca (BRA)
2026 Long Beach Olympic Classes Regatta	(United States) Long Beach	July 13–16	4	United States; Canada; Mexico; Argentina
2027 World Sailing Championships	(Brazil) Fortaleza	January 15–23	3	
TOTAL			9	

=== ILCA 7 men ===
Event	Location	Date	Boats	Qualified
Host nation	—N/a	—N/a	1	Peru
2025 Junior Pan American Games	(Paraguay) Asunción	August 15–17	1	Charles barclay (USA)
2026 San Pedro Olympic Classes Regatta	(United States) San Pedro	July 20–25	3	Bermuda; Chile; United States
2026 Central American and Caribbean Games	(Dominican Republic) Santo Domingo	August 1–8	2	Puerto Rico; Saint Lucia
2026 South American Games	(Argentina) Rosario	September 12–26	2	Brazil; Argentina
2026 Cork Olympic Classes Regatta	(Canada) Kingston	September 25–27	2	Canada; Mexico
2027 World Sailing Championships	(Brazil) Fortaleza	January 15–23	2	
2027 Central American and South American ILCA Championships	(Uruguay) TBD	March 15–28	2	
Universality	—N/a	—N/a	2	
TOTAL			17	

=== 49er men ===
Event	Location	Date	Boats	Qualified
Host nation	—N/a	—N/a	1	Peru
2026 San Pedro Olympic Classes Regatta	(United States) San Pedro	August 3–8	6	Argentina; Canada; Mexico; Puerto Rico; United States; Uruguay
2026 South American Championship	(Brazil) Rio de Janeiro	November 14–18	1	
TOTAL			8	

=== Sunfish men ===
Event	Location	Date	Boats	Qualified
Host nation	—N/a	—N/a	1	Peru
2026 Central American and Caribbean Games	(Dominican Republic) Santo Domingo	August 1–8	1	Puerto Rico
2026 South American Championship	(Peru) Paracas	August 12–16	1	Guatemala
2026 South American Games	(Argentina) Rosario	September 12–26	1	Colombia
2026 World Sunfish Championships	(United States Virgin Islands) Saint Croix	November 14–18	1	
2027 Central American and South American Championships	(Ecuador) TBD	TBD	1	
2027 Sunfish Midwinters	(United States) Pensacola	March 17–20	2	
TOTAL			8	

=== IQFoil women ===
Event	Location	Date	Boats	Qualified
Host nation	—N/a	—N/a	1	Peru
2025 Junior Pan American Games	(Paraguay) Asunción	August 15–17	1	Zara Rozeboom (ARU)
2026 Long Beach Olympic Classes Regatta	(United States) Long Beach	July 13–16	2	United States; Mexico
2026 Central American and Caribbean Games	(Dominican Republic) Santo Domingo	August 1–8	1	Puerto Rico
2026 South American Championship	(Peru) Paracas	August 12–16	1	Argentina
2026 South American Games	(Argentina) Rosario	September 12–26	1	Uruguay
2027 World Sailing Championships	(Brazil) Fortaleza	January 15–23	2	
TOTAL			9	

=== Kites women ===
Event	Location	Date	Boats	Qualified
Host nation	—N/a	—N/a	1	Peru
2026 Long Beach Olympic Classes Regatta	(United States) Long Beach	July 13–16	~~4~~ 3	United States; Argentina; Canada
2027 World Sailing Championships	(Brazil) Fortaleza	January 15–23	3	
TOTAL			8	

=== ILCA 6 women ===
Event	Location	Date	Boats	Qualified
Host nation	—N/a	—N/a	1	Peru
2025 Junior Pan American Games	(Paraguay) Asunción	August 15–17	1	Eliza Denning (BAH)
2026 San Pedro Olympic Classes Regatta	(United States) San Pedro	July 20–25	3	United States; Argentina; Bermuda
2026 Central American and Caribbean Games	(Dominican Republic) Santo Domingo	August 1–8	2	Mexico; Puerto Rico
2026 South American Games	(Argentina) Rosario	September 12–26	2	Brazil; Chile
2026 Cork Olympic Classes Regatta	(Canada) Kingston	September 25–27	2	Canada; Cayman Islands
2027 World Sailing Championships	(Brazil) Fortaleza	January 15–23	2	
2027 Central American and South American ILCA Championships	(Uruguay) TBD	March 15–28	2	
Universality	—N/a	—N/a	2	
TOTAL			17	

=== 49er FX women ===
Event	Location	Date	Boats	Qualified
Host nation	—N/a	—N/a	1	Peru
2026 San Pedro Olympic Classes Regatta	(United States) San Pedro	August 3–8	~~6~~ 4	Argentina; Canada; Puerto Rico; United States
2026 South American Championship	(Brazil) Rio de Janeiro	November 14–18	1	
TOTAL			8	

=== Sunfish women ===
Event	Location	Date	Boats	Qualified
Host nation	—N/a	—N/a	1	Peru
2026 Central American and Caribbean Games	(Dominican Republic) Santo Domingo	August 1–8	1	Trinidad and Tobago
2026 South American Championship	(Peru) Paracas	August 12–16	1	Guatemala
2026 South American Games	(Argentina) Rosario	September 12–26	1	Ecuador
2026 World Sunfish Championships	(United States Virgin Islands) Saint Croix	November 14–18	1	
2027 Central American and South American Championships	(Ecuador) TBD	TBD	1	
2027 Sunfish Midwinters	(United States) Pensacola	March 17–20	2	
TOTAL			8	

=== 470 mixed ===
Event	Location	Date	Boats	Qualified
Host nation	—N/a	—N/a	1	Peru
2026 San Pedro Olympic Classes Regatta	(United States) San Pedro	July 20–25	~~4~~ 3	United States; Canada; Puerto Rico
2026 South American Championships	(Brazil) Rio de Janeiro	November 14–18	3	
TOTAL			8	

=== Nacra 17 mixed ===
Event	Location	Date	Boats	Qualified
Host nation	—N/a	—N/a	1	Peru
2026 San Pedro Olympic Classes Regatta	(United States) San Pedro	August 3–8	~~6~~ 3	Argentina; Canada; United States
2026 South American Championship	TBD	TBD	1	
TOTAL			8	

=== Snipe mixed ===
Event	Location	Date	Boats	Qualified
Host nation	—N/a	—N/a	1	Peru
2026 Central American and Caribbean Games	(Dominican Republic) Santo Domingo	August 1–8	1	Puerto Rico
2026 South American Games	(Argentina) Rosario	September 12–26	1	Brazil
2027 South American Snipe Championships	TBD	March	2	
2027 Don Q Regatta	(United States) Miami	March - April	3	
TOTAL			8	

=== Lightning mixed ===
Event	Location	Date	Boats	Qualified
Host nation	—N/a	—N/a	1	Peru
2026 Canadian Open	(Canada) Ridgeway	July 11–12	4	Chile; United States; Brazil; Canada
2026 South American Championship	(Peru) Paracas	August 3–9	2	Colombia; Ecuador
2026 Salinas Sailing Week	(Ecuador) Salinas	September 1–5	1	Argentina
TOTAL			8	
