= Swimming at the 2015 Pan American Games – Men's 50 metre freestyle =

Men's 50 metre freestyle at the 2015 Pan American Games
- Venue: CIBC Pan Am/Parapan Am Aquatics Centre and Field House
- Dates: July 17 (preliminaries and finals)
- Competitors: 22 from 18 nations
- Winning time: 21.86

Medalists
Gold medal	Josh Schneider	United States
Silver medal	Bruno Fratus	Brazil
Bronze medal	George Bovell	Trinidad and Tobago

The men's 50 metre freestyle competition of the swimming events at the 2015 Pan American Games took place on July 17 at the CIBC Pan Am/Parapan Am Aquatics Centre and Field House in Toronto, Canada. The defending Pan American Games champion was César Cielo Filho of Brazil.

This race consisted of one length of the pool in freestyle. The top eight swimmers from the heats would qualify for the A final (where the medals would be awarded), while the next best eight swimmers would qualify for the B final.

== Records ==
Prior to this competition, the existing world and Pan American Games records were as follows:

World record	César Cielo Filho (BRA)	20.91	São Paulo, Brazil	December 18, 2009
Pan American Games record	César Cielo Filho (BRA)	21.58	Guadalajara, Mexico	October 20, 2011

== Qualification ==
Each National Olympic Committee (NOC) was able to enter up to two entrants providing they had met the A standard (22.71) in the qualifying period (January 1, 2014 to May 1, 2015). NOCs were also permitted to enter one athlete providing they had met the B standard (24.07) in the same qualifying period. All other competing athletes were entered as universality spots.

== Schedule ==
All times are Eastern Time Zone (UTC-4).

Date	Time	Round
July 17, 2015	11:45	Heats
July 17, 2015	12:25	Swim-off
July 17, 2015	21:12	Final B
July 17, 2015	21:16	Final A

== Results ==
KEY:	q	Fastest non-qualifiers	Q	Qualified	GR	Games record	NR	National record	PB	Personal best	SB	Seasonal best

=== Heats ===
The first round was held on July 17.

Rank	Heat	Lane	Name	Nationality	Time	Notes
1	1	4	Josh Schneider	United States	21.97	QA
2	2	4	Cullen Jones	United States	22.12	QA
3	2	6	Federico Grabich	Argentina	22.25	QA
4	3	6	Renzo Tjon A Joe	Suriname	22.31	QA
5	3	4	Bruno Fratus	Brazil	22.33	QA
6	1	5	George Bovell	Trinidad and Tobago	22.34	QA
7	3	3	Oleksandr Loginov	Canada	22.37	QA
8	2	3	Erik Risolvato	Puerto Rico	22.48	?
8	1	3	Dylan Carter	Trinidad and Tobago	22.48	?
10	2	5	Karl Krug	Canada	22.55	QB
11	1	6	Brett Fraser	Cayman Islands	22.71	QB
12	3	5	Nicholas Santos	Brazil	22.74	QB
13	3	2	Cristian Quintero	Venezuela	22.77	QB
14	2	2	Jordan Augier	Saint Lucia	23.17	QB
15	2	7	Charles Hockin	Paraguay	23.57	QB
16	1	2	Allan Gutiérrez Castro	Honduras	23.62	QB
17	1	7	Miguel Mena	Nicaragua	23.71	
18	3	7	Jordy Groters	Aruba	23.93	
19	3	1	Nikolas Sylvester	Saint Vincent and the Grenadines	26.14	
20	3	8	Omar Adams	Guyana	26.58	
21	1	1	Corey Ollivierre	Grenada	26.61	
22	2	1	Frantz Dorsainvil	Haiti	33.83	

=== Swim-off ===
A swim-off was contested between Erik Risolvato and Dylan Carter to determine who would advance as the eighth seed to the A Final, while the loser would advance to the B Final.

Rank	Lane	Name	Nationality	Time	Notes
1	5	Erik Risolvato	Puerto Rico	22.33	QA
2	4	Dylan Carter	Trinidad and Tobago	22.39	QB

=== B Final ===
The B final was also held on July 17.

Rank	Lane	Name	Nationality	Time	Notes
9	4	Dylan Carter	Trinidad and Tobago	22.39	
10	6	Nicholas Santos	Brazil	22.55	
11	5	Karl Krug	Canada	22.59	
12	2	Cristian Quintero	Venezuela	22.76	
13	3	Brett Fraser	Cayman Islands	22.93	
14	7	Jordan Augier	Saint Lucia	23.08	
15	8	Allan Gutiérrez Castro	Honduras	23.61	
16	1	Charles Hockin	Paraguay	23.76	

=== A Final ===
The A final was also held on July 17.

Rank	Lane	Name	Nationality	Time	Notes
1st place, gold medalist(s)	4	Josh Schneider	United States	21.86	
2nd place, silver medalist(s)	2	Bruno Fratus	Brazil	21.91	
3rd place, bronze medalist(s)	7	George Bovell	Trinidad and Tobago	22.17	
4	8	Erik Risolvato	Puerto Rico	22.22	
5	5	Cullen Jones	United States	22.23	
6	3	Federico Grabich	Argentina	22.29	
7	6	Renzo Tjon A Joe	Suriname	22.30	
8	1	Oleksandr Loginov	Canada	22.47	
