= Beach volleyball at the 2015 Pan American Games – Qualification =

== Qualification system ==
A total of sixteen teams per gender qualified to compete at the games. The host nation (Canada) qualified in each event, along with the top five ranked nations in South America and the top ten nations ranked in North, Central America and the Caribbean. The rankings on January 1, 2015 were used to determine the teams.

== Qualification summary ==
NOC	Men	Women	Athletes
Aruba	X		2
Argentina	X	X	4
Brazil	X	X	4
Canada	X	X	4
Cayman Islands		X	2
Chile	X	X	4
Colombia		X	2
Costa Rica		X	2
Cuba	X	X	4
El Salvador	X	X	4
Guatemala	X	X	4
Mexico	X	X	4
Nicaragua	X	X	4
Puerto Rico	X	X	4
Saint Lucia	X		2
Trinidad and Tobago	X	X	4
United States	X	X	4
Uruguay	X	X	4
Venezuela	X		2
Total: 19 NOC's	16	16	64

== Men ==
North, Central America and the Caribbean

Rank	NOC	Total
1	United States	5600
2	Canada	5560
3	Puerto Rico	5310
4	Mexico	5110
5	Guatemala	3220
6	Costa Rica	2740
7	Cuba	2710
8	Dominican Republic	2506
9	Trinidad and Tobago	2270
10	El Salvador	2090
11	Saint Lucia	1751
12	Aruba	1685
13	Nicaragua	1555
14	Virgin Islands	989
15	Cayman Islands	765
16	Barbados	490
17	Honduras	440
18	Jamaica	421
19	Saint Kitts and Nevis	325
20	Bahamas	280
21	Antigua and Barbuda	185
22	Grenada	150
23	Dominica	70
23	Belize	70
25	Panama	60
26	Saint Vincent and the Grenadines	35
27	British Virgin Islands	10
28	Suriname	5

South America

Rank	NOC	Total
1	Brazil	1640
2	Chile	1580
3	Argentina	1460
4	Uruguay	1080
5	Venezuela	1000
6	Colombia	740
7	Paraguay	700
8	Bolivia	540
9	Peru	400
10	Ecuador	200

- As the host nation Canada, was ranked among the top ten nations, the eleventh nation (Saint Lucia) qualified as well. The Dominican Republic and Costa Rica declined their quotas. Their spots were given to the twelfth and thirteenth nations (Aruba and Nicaragua respective).

== Women ==
North, Central America and the Caribbean

Rank	NOC	Total
1	United States	6420
2	Mexico	5730
3	Canada	5645
4	Costa Rica	4475
5	Puerto Rico	3120
6	Guatemala	3000
7	Cuba	2280
8	Dominican Republic	2205
9	Trinidad and Tobago	2085
10	El Salvador	1615
11	Nicaragua	1435
12	Cayman Islands	1135
13	Honduras	1110
14	Saint Lucia	750
15	Saint Kitts and Nevis	695
16	Virgin Islands	671
17	Jamaica	470
18	Barbados	340
19	Saint Vincent and the Grenadines	240
20	Grenada	35
21	Bahamas	25

South America

Rank	NOC	Total
1	Brazil	1680
2	Argentina	1600
3	Colombia	1180
4	Uruguay	1120
5	Chile	1080
6	Venezuela	980
7	Paraguay	900
8	Bolivia	620
9	Peru	620
10	Ecuador	300

- As the host nation Canada, was ranked among the top ten nations, the eleventh nation (Nicaragua) qualified as well. The Dominican Republic declined its quota.
