= Grenada at the Pan American Games =

- IOC code: GRN
- NOC: Grenada Olympic Committee
- Website: www.olympic.org/grenada
- Medals Ranked 36th: Gold 1 Silver 3 Bronze 2 Total 6

Pan American Games appearances (overview)
- 1987; 1991; 1995; 1999; 2003; 2007; 2011; 2015; 2019; 2023

Grenada has competed at every edition of the Pan American Games since the tenth edition of the multi-sport event in 1987. Sprinter Hazel-Ann Regis won the country's first Pan Am medal in 2003, a silver in the women's 400 metres. To date, all four of Grenada's medals have been won in the sport of track and field. Grenada did not compete at the first and only Pan American Winter Games in 1990.

The country won its first ever gold medal at the 2019 Pan American Games in Lima, with Anderson Peters winning gold in the javelin throw event.

== Pan American Games ==
=== Medals by games ===
Year	Host city	Gold	Silver	Bronze	Total
1987	(United States) Indianapolis	0	0	0	0
1991	(Cuba) Havana	0	0	0	0
1995	(Argentina) Mar del Plata	0	0	0	0
1999	(Canada) Winnipeg	0	0	0	0
2003	(Dominican Republic) Santo Domingo	0	1	1	2
2007	(Brazil) Rio de Janeiro	0	0	1	1
2011	(Mexico) Guadalajara	0	0	0	0
2015	(Canada) Toronto	0	1	0	1
2019	(Peru) Lima	1	1	0	2
2023	(Chile) Santiago	0	0	0	0
Total		1	3	2	6

== Junior Pan American Games ==
=== Medals by games ===
Games	Gold	Silver	Bronze	Total	Rank
(Colombia) 2021 Cali-Valle	0	1	0	1	22nd
(Paraguay) 2025 Asunción	Future event				
Total	0	1	0	1	22nd

=== Medals by sport ===
Sport	Gold	Silver	Bronze	Total
Athletics	0	1	0	1
Totals (1 entries)	0	1	0	1

=== Medalists ===
Medal	Name	Games	Sport	Event
Silver	Joniar Thomas	2021 Cali-Valle	Athletics	Women's heptathlon
