= 2015 Pan American Games closing ceremony =

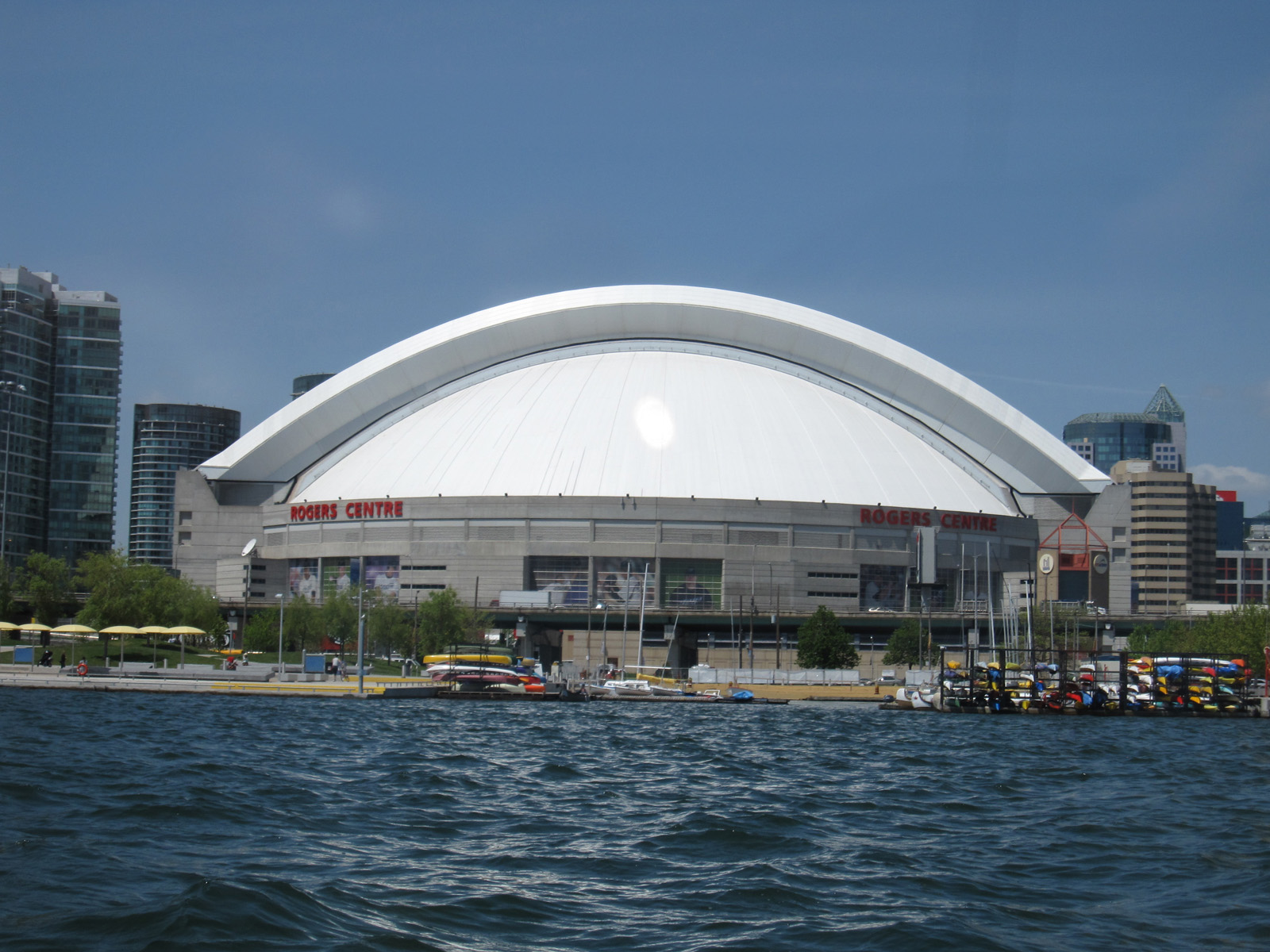
The closing ceremony was hosted at Rogers Centre

The closing ceremony of the 2015 Pan American Games took place on Sunday July 26, 2015, beginning at 8:00 p.m. EDT at the Rogers Centre (Pan Am Dome) in Toronto, Ontario, Canada. The closing ceremony was produced and directed jointly by three companies B5C Productions, BaAM Productions and FiveCurrents.

The tickets for the ceremony ranged between CA$90 and CA$200.

== Production ==
In 2014 Live Nation was announced as a sponsor of the games; organizers stated that the company would leverage its resources to invite Canadian and international acts to perform at the ceremony. On July 15, 2015, organizers confirmed that American hip-hop artist Kanye West would headline the closing ceremony, joined by Pitbull and Serena Ryder. The announcement of West's participation was controversial, as critics and others believed that the closing ceremony should have been headlined by a Canadian artist; over 30,000 signatures were made on a Change.org petition to have him replaced. Mayor of Toronto John Tory, was also criticized for mistakenly referring to West as being a "proud product" of Toronto, despite actually being born in Atlanta.

== Program ==
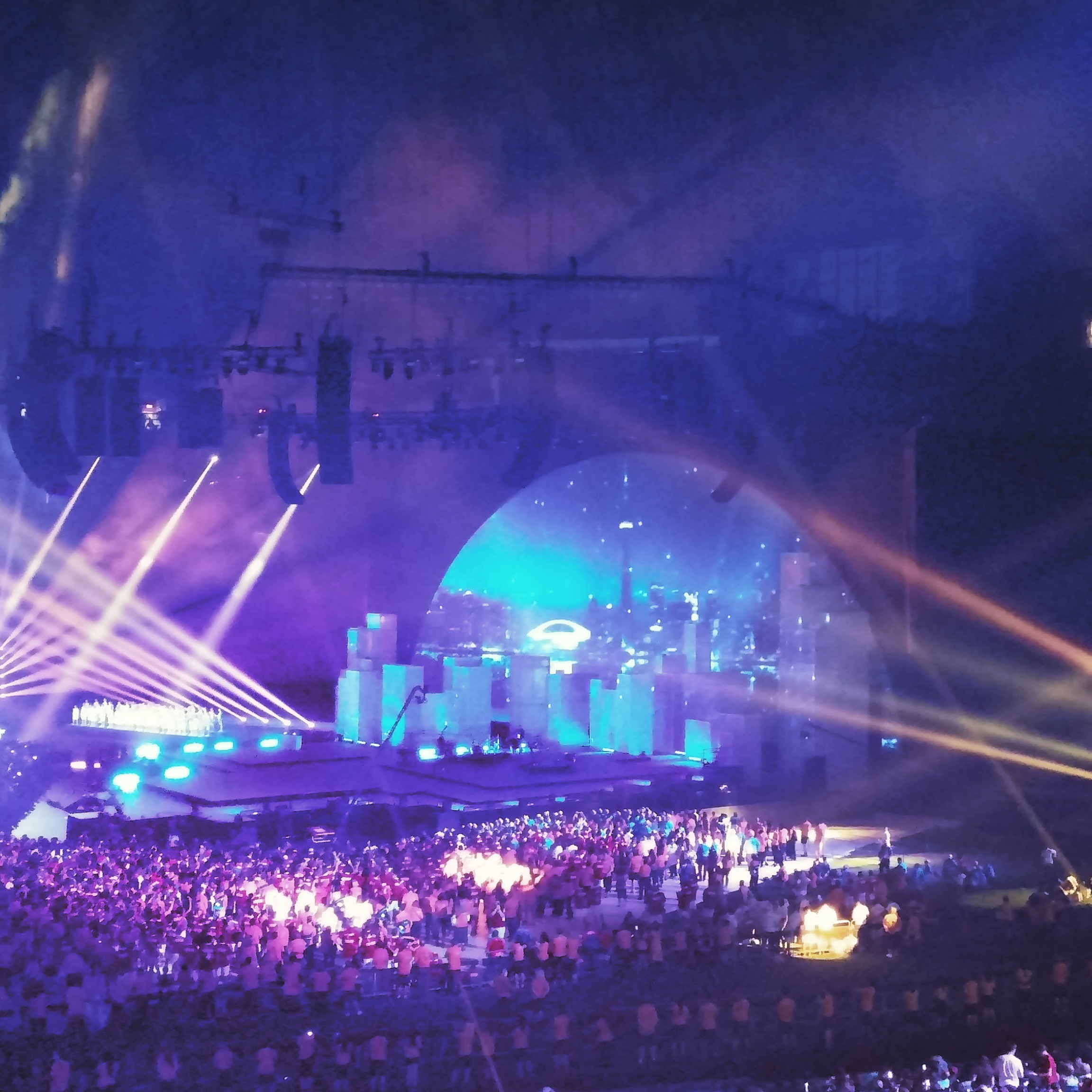
A scene from the ceremony

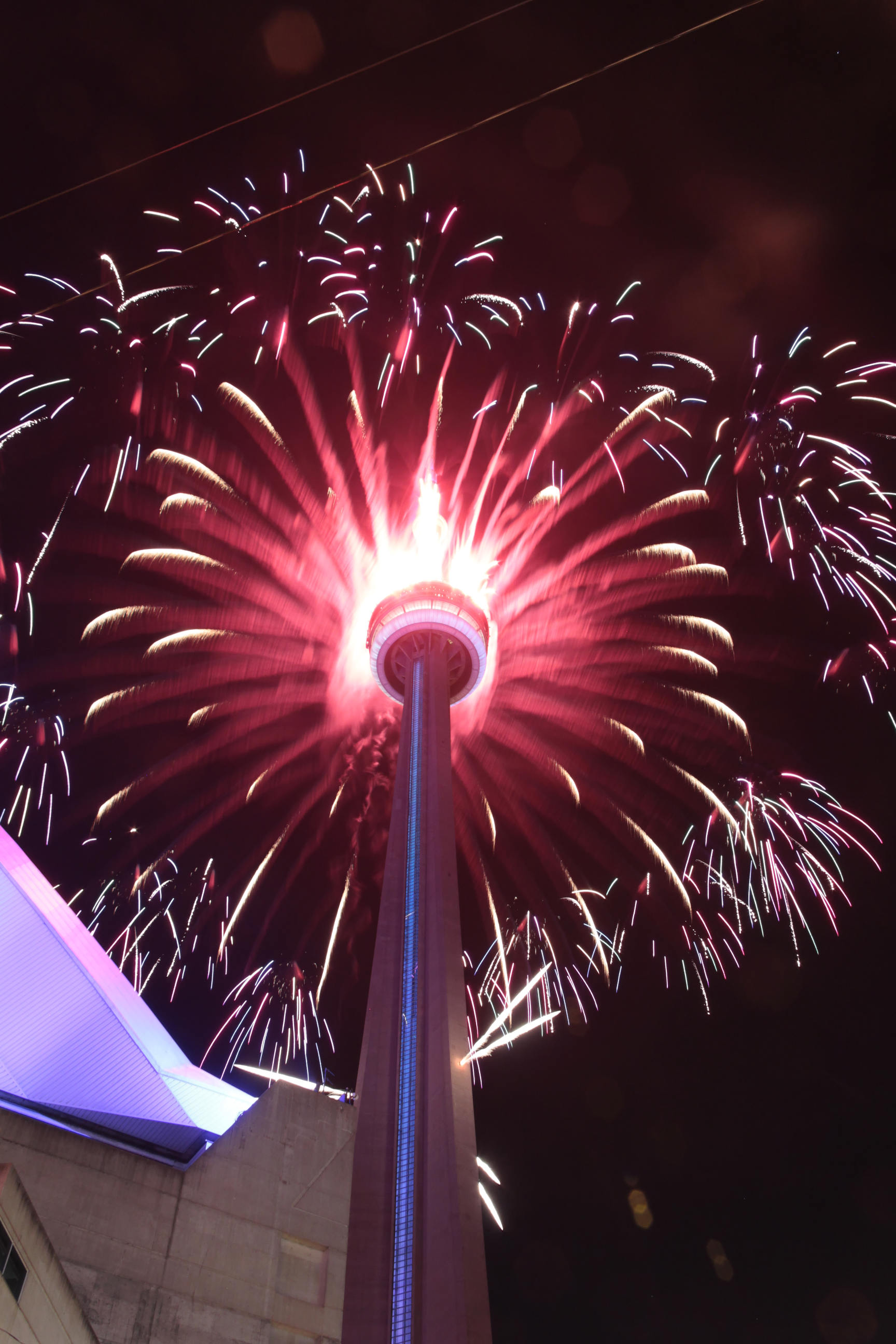
Fireworks at the conclusion of the ceremony.

The cultural portion of the ceremony took place on a stage with a scale model of Toronto's skyline, featuring a medley of dances representing various ethnic communities and music styles of Toronto. Following closing speeches by Ivar Sisniega, vice president of PASO, and Saad Rafi, president of the Toronto 2015 Organizing Committee, as per protocol, the Pan American Sports Organization flag was handed over by John Tory to Luis Castañeda Lossio, Mayor of Lima, Peru, host of the 2019 Pan American Games. This was followed by a cultural presentation by Peru, culminating with a sequence set to La Sarita's song "Carnaval".

Serena Ryder performed "Together We Are One", the official theme of the 2015 Pan American Games, along with her own hit "Stompa". Pitbull's segment featured songs such as "Fireball" and "Give Me Everything". Kanye West opened his set with "Stronger". After calling upon the lights to be turned on, he continued on with a set that included "Power, "Black Skinhead", "Gold Digger", "Touch the Sky", "All Of The Lights" and "Good Life". During his performance of "Good Life", West abruptly threw his microphone up in the air and walked off the stage; his performance had been afflicted by audio issues that caused his microphone to only be audible to television audiences. The ceremony concluded with a fireworks display on the CN Tower.

== Flagbearers ==
Order	Nation	Spanish	French	Flag bearer	Sport
1	Argentina	Argentina	Argentine	Julian Pinzas	Karate
2	Antigua and Barbuda	Antigua y Barbuda	Antigue et Barbude	Miguel Francis	Athletics
3	Aruba	Aruba	Aruba	Thashaina Seraus	Bowling
4	Bahamas	Bahamas	Bahamas	Ramon Miller	Athletics
5	Barbados	Barbados	Barbade	Ramon Gittens	Athletics
6	Belize	Belice	Belize	Mark Anderson	Athletics
7	Bermuda	Bermuda	Bermudes	Patrick Nisbett	Equestrian
8	Bolivia	Bolivia	Bolivie	Conrrado Moscoso	Racquetball
9	Brazil	Brasil	Brésil	Miraildes Formiga	Football
10	Chile	Chile	Chili	Érika Olivera	Athletics
11	Colombia	Colombia	Colombie	Caterine Ibargüen	Athletics
12	Costa Rica	Costa Rica	Costa Rica	David Jiménez	Boxing
13	Cuba	Cuba	Cuba	Mijaín López	Wrestling
14	Dominica	Dominica	Dominique	Yordanys Durañona	Athletics
15	Ecuador	Ecuador	Equateur	Maria Sotomayor	Racquetball
16	El Salvador	El Salvador	Salvador	Jorge Merino	Karate
17	United States	Estados Unidos de América	États-Unis D'Amerique	Claressa Shields	Boxing
18	Grenada	Granada	Grenade	Kurt Felix	Athletics
19	Guatemala	Guatemala	Guatemala	Erick Barrondo	Athletics
20	Guyana	Guyana	Guyana	Priyanna Ramdhani	Badminton
21	Haiti	Haití	Haïti	Marlena Wesh	Athletics
22	Honduras	Honduras	Honduras	Rolando Palacios	Athletics
23	Cayman Islands	Islas Caimán	Îles Caïmans	Kemar Hyman	Athletics
24	British Virgin Islands	Islas Vírgenes Británicas	Îles Vierges britanniques	Chantel Malone	Athletics
25	Virgin Islands	Islas Vírgenes de los Estados Unidos	Îles Vierges des États-Unis	Clayton Laurent	Boxing
26	Jamaica	Jamaica	Jamaïque	Rasheed Dwyer	Athletics
27	Mexico	México	Mexique	Paola Longoria	Racquetball
28	Nicaragua	Nicaragua	Nicaragua	Dalila Rugama	Athletics
29	Panama	Panamá	Panama	Eileen Grench	Fencing
30	Paraguay	Paraguay	Paraguay	Camila Pirelli	Athletics
31	Peru	Perú	Perou	Alexandra Grande	Karate
32	Puerto Rico	Puerto Rico	Porto Rico	Mónica González Rivera	Boxing
33	Dominican Republic	República Dominicana	République dominicaine	Ana Villanueva	Karate
34	Saint Kitts and Nevis	San Cristóbal y Nieves	Saint-Christophe-et-Niévès	Shenel Crooke	Athletics
35	Saint Vincent and the Grenadines	San Vicente y las Granadinas	Saint-Vincent-et-les-Grenadines	Kineke Alexander	Athletics
36	Saint Lucia	Santa Lucía	Sainte-Lucie	Stephanie Devaux-Lovell	Sailing
37	Suriname	Surinam	Suriname	Konstantinos Panagiotidis	NOC assistant (volunteer)
38	Trinidad and Tobago	Trinidad y Tobago	Trinité-et-Tobago	Mikel Thomas	Athletics
39	Uruguay	Uruguay	Uruguay	Fabricio Formiliano	Football
40	Venezuela	Venezuela	Venezuela	Rosa Rodríguez	Athletics
41	Canada	Canadá	Canada	Kia Nurse	Basketball

== Anthems ==
- Layla Claire, Ben Heppner and Children's Choirs – "O Canada"
- Instrumental Version – Anthem of PASO
- Estefania Castilla Pajares – National Anthem of Peru
