= Saint Lucia at the 2015 Pan American Games =

- IOC code: LCA
- NOC: Saint Lucia Olympic Committee
- Website: www.slunoc.org

in Toronto, Canada 10–26 July 2015
- Competitors: 6 in 4 sports
- Flag bearer (opening): Jordan Augier
- Flag bearer (closing): Stephanie Devaux-Lovell
- Medals: Gold 1 Silver 0 Bronze 0 Total 1

Pan American Games appearances (overview)
- 1995; 1999; 2003; 2007; 2011; 2015; 2019; 2023

Saint Lucia competed at the 2015 Pan American Games in Toronto, Canada from July 10 to 26, 2015.

Swimmer Jordan Augier was the flagbearer for the team during the opening ceremony.

High jumper Levern Spencer won St. Lucia's first ever Pan American Games gold medal.

== Competitors ==
The following table lists Saint Lucia's delegation per sport and gender.

Sport	Men	Women	Total
Athletics	0	2	2
Beach volleyball	2	0	2
Sailing	0	1	1
Swimming	1	0	1
Total	3	3	6

== Medalists ==
The following competitors from Saint Lucia won medals at the games. In the by discipline sections below, medalists' names are bolded.

Medal	Name	Sport	Event	Date
Gold	Levern Spencer	Athletics	Women's high jump	July 22

**Medals by sport**
**Sport**	1st place, gold medalist(s)	2nd place, silver medalist(s)	3rd place, bronze medalist(s)	**Total**
Athletics	1	0	0	1
**Total**	**1**	**0**	**0**	**1**

**Medals by day**
**Day**	1st place, gold medalist(s)	2nd place, silver medalist(s)	3rd place, bronze medalist(s)	**Total**
July 22	1	0	0	1
**Total**	**1**	**0**	**0**	**1**

== Athletics ==
Saint Lucia qualified two female athletes.

Key

- Note – Ranks given for track events are for the entire round

Women
Field events

Athlete(s)	Event	Final	
Athlete(s)	Event	Result	Rank
Jeanelle Scheper	High jump	1.88	5
**Levern Spencer**	High jump	1.94	1st place, gold medalist(s)

== Beach volleyball ==
Saint Lucia qualified a men's pair.

Athlete	Event	Preliminary Round			13th to 16th Round	13th to 14th Round	Finals
Athlete	Event	Opposition Score	Opposition Score	Opposition Score	Opposition Score	Opposition Score	Rank
Julian Bissette; Joseph Clercent	Men's tournament	Evans / Satterfield (USA); **L** 18–21, 11–21	Capogrosso / Mehamed (ARG); **L** 17–21, 17–21	Díaz / González (CUB); **L** 13–21, 12–21	Daniel / de Cuba (ARU); **W** 18–21, 21–18, 19–17	Talavera / Vargas (ESA); **L** 20–22, 21–17, 10–15	14

== Sailing ==
Saint Lucia qualified one sailor.

Athlete	Event	Race													Total Points	Net Points	Final Rank
Athlete	Event	1	2	3	4	5	6	7	8	9	10	11	12	M*	Total Points	Net Points	Final Rank
Stephanie Devaux-Lovell	Laser Radial	7	8	12	14	(16)	5	10	11	11	7	6	4	—N/a	111	95	11

== Swimming ==
Saint Lucia qualified one male swimmer.

Athlete	Event	Heat		Final	
Athlete	Event	Time	Rank	Time	Rank
Jordan Augier	Men's 50 m freestyle	23.17 **QB**	5	23.08	14
Jordan Augier	Men's 100 m backstroke	DNS		—N/a	
Jordan Augier	Men's 100 m freestyle	50.82 **QB**	5	50.83	12

== See also ==
- Saint Lucia at the 2016 Summer Olympics
