= Saint Lucia at the Pan American Games =

- IOC code: LCA
- NOC: Saint Lucia Olympic Committee
- Website: www.slunoc.org
- Medals Ranked 29th: Gold 1 Silver 0 Bronze 2 Total 3

Pan American Games appearances (overview)
- 1995; 1999; 2003; 2007; 2011; 2015; 2019; 2023

Saint Lucia has competed at every edition of the Pan American Games since the twelfth edition of the multi-sport event in 1995. Track and field athlete Dominic Johnson won the country's first Pan Am medal in 2003, a bronze in the men's pole vault. To date, all three of Saint Lucia's medals have been won in the sport of track and field. As of the last Pan American Games in 2015, Saint Lucia is twenty-ninth on the all time medals list. Saint Lucia did not compete at the first and only Pan American Winter Games in 1990.

High jumper Levern Spencer won St. Lucia's first ever Pan American Games gold medal, in 2015.

== Pan American Games ==
=== Medals by games ===
Year	Host city	Gold	Silver	Bronze	Total
1995	(Argentina) Mar del Plata	0	0	0	0
1999	(Canada) Winnipeg	0	0	0	0
2003	(Dominican Republic) Santo Domingo	0	0	1	1
2007	(Brazil) Rio de Janeiro	0	0	1	1
2011	(Mexico) Guadalajara	0	0	0	0
2015	(Canada) Toronto	1	0	0	1
2019	(Peru) Lima	1	0	1	2
2023	(Chile) Santiago	0	0	0	0
Total		2	0	3	5

== Junior Pan American Games ==
=== Medals by games ===
Games	Gold	Silver	Bronze	Total	Rank
(Colombia) 2021 Cali-Valle	0	0	1	1	28th
(Paraguay) 2025 Asunción	Future event				
Total	0	0	1	1	28th

=== Medals by sport ===
Sport	Gold	Silver	Bronze	Total
Sailing	0	0	1	1
Totals (1 entries)	0	0	1	1

=== Medalists ===
Medal	Name	Games	Sport	Event
Bronze	Luc Chevrier	2021 Cali-Valle	Sailing	Men's ILCA 7
