= Athletics at the 2019 Pan American Games – Men's decathlon =

Men's decathlon at the 2019 Pan American Games
- Venue: Athletics Stadium
- Dates: August 6 – August 7
- Competitors: 13 from 9 nations
- Winning score: 8513

Medalists
Gold medal	Damian Warner	Canada
Silver medal	Lindon Victor	Grenada
Bronze medal	Pierce LePage	Canada

The men's decathlon competition of the athletics events at the 2019 Pan American Games will take place between the 6 and 7 of August at the 2019 Pan American Games Athletics Stadium. The defending Pan American Games champion is Damian Warner from Canada.

== Records ==
Prior to this competition, the existing world and Pan American Games records were as follows:

World record	Kevin Mayer (FRA)	9126	Talence, France	September 16, 2018
Pan American Games record	Damian Warner (CAN)	8659	Toronto, Canada	July 23, 2015

== Schedule ==
Date	Time	Round
August 6, 2019	14:00	100 metres
August 6, 2019	14:40	Long jump
August 6, 2019	16:10	Shot put
August 6, 2019	17:22	High jump
August 6, 2019	19:33	400 metres
August 7, 2019	14:00	110 metres hurdles
August 7, 2019	14:45	Discus throw
August 7, 2019	16:35	Pole vault
August 7, 2019	18:35	Javelin throw
August 7, 2019	19:40	1500 metres
August 7, 2019	19:40	Final standings

== Results ==
All times shown are in seconds.

KEY:	PR	Pan Am record	NR	National record	PB	Personal best	SB	Seasonal best	DB	Decathlon best

=== 100 m ===
Wind: -0.5 m/s (Heat 1), +1.6 m/s (Heat 2)

Rank	Heat	Name	Nationality	Time	Points	Notes
1	1	Damian Warner	Canada	10.32	1018	
2	1	Pierce LePage	Canada	10.51	973	
3	1	Lindon Victor	Grenada	10.82	901	
4	1	Geormi Jaramillo	Venezuela	10.87	890	
5	1	Nathan Hite	United States	10.96	870	PB
6	1	Ken Mullings	Bahamas	11.09	841	
7	2	Gerson Izaguirre	Venezuela	11.21	814	PB
8	2	Jefferson Santos	Brazil	11.25	806	
9	2	Briander Rivero	Cuba	11.32	791	
10	2	Leonel Suárez	Cuba	11.38	778	PB
11	1	Kurt Felix	Grenada	11.40	774	
12	2	Andy Preciado	Ecuador	11.42	769	PB
13	2	José Lemos	Colombia	11.58	736	

=== Long jump ===
Rank	Group	Name	Nationality	#1	#2	#3	Mark	Points	Notes	Total
1	A	Damian Warner	Canada	7.50	7.74	x	7.74	995	SB	2013
2	B	Pierce LePage	Canada	7.35	7.53	7.64	7.64	970		1943
3	B	Lindon Victor	Grenada	7.05	7.39	7.02	7.39	908		1809
4	A	Gerson Izaguirre	Venezuela	7.29	7.06	x	7.29	883	=SB	1697
5	B	Geormi Jaramillo	Venezuela	7.18	x	6.89	7.18	857		1747
6	A	Ken Mullings	Bahamas	7.07	6.52	6.96	7.07	830	SB	1671
7	B	Jefferson Santos	Brazil	6.93	7.05	6.98	7.05	826		1632
8	B	Briander Rivero	Cuba	6.94	x	6.97	6.97	807		1598
9	A	Leonel Suárez	Cuba	6.73	6.79	6.89	6.89	788		1566
10	A	Nathan Hite	United States	6.69	6.82	6.85	6.85	778		1648
11	B	Andy Preciado	Ecuador	x	6.84	x	6.84	776		1545
12	B	José Lemos	Colombia	6.48	6.45	6.24	6.48	693		1429
	A	Kurt Felix	Grenada	x	–	–	NM	0		774

=== Shot put ===
Rank	Group	Name	Nationality	#1	#2	#3	Mark	Points	Notes	Total
1	B	José Lemos	Colombia	14.50	15.84	16.36	16.36	873		2302
2	B	Geormi Jaramillo	Venezuela	15.37	15.84	x	15.84	841		2588
3	B	Lindon Victor	Grenada	15.04	x	x	15.04	792		2601
4	B	Damian Warner	Canada	14.65	15.01	14.38	15.01	790		2803
5	A	Jefferson Santos	Brazil	14.44	14.00	13.97	14.44	755		2387
6	A	Pierce LePage	Canada	13.86	x	14.35	14.35	750	SB	2693
7	A	Leonel Suárez	Cuba	13.19	13.90	14.08	14.08	733	SB	2299
8	B	Andy Preciado	Ecuador	14.08	13.05	x	14.08	733		2278
9	A	Nathan Hite	United States	13.20	13.06	13.72	13.72	711		2359
10	B	Briander Rivero	Cuba	13.26	12.46	13.18	13.26	683		2281
11	A	Ken Mullings	Bahamas	12.42	12.64	12.86	12.86	659		2330
12	A	Gerson Izaguirre	Venezuela	11.87	11.65	12.28	12.28	623		2320
	A	Kurt Felix	Grenada	x	–	–	NM	0		774

=== High jump ===
Rank	Group	Name	Nationality	1.70	1.73	1.76	1.79	1.82	1.85	1.88	1.91	1.94	1.97	2.00	2.03	2.06	2.09	Mark	Points	Notes	Total
1	A	Andy Preciado	Ecuador	–	–	–	–	–	–	–	xo	–	o	–	xo	–	xxx	2.03	831		3109
2	A	Ken Mullings	Bahamas	–	–	–	–	–	–	–	o	–	xxo	xo	xo	xxx		2.03	831		3161
3	A	Pierce LePage	Canada	–	–	–	–	–	–	–	–	–	–	o	r			2.00	803		3496
4	B	Lindon Victor	Grenada	–	–	–	–	–	–	o	o	xxo	o	o	xxx			2.00	803	=SB	3404
5	A	Jefferson Santos	Brazil	–	–	–	–	o	–	o	–	xxo	o	xxx				1.97	776		3163
6	B	Briander Rivero	Cuba	–	–	–	–	–	xo	o	xxo	o	o	xxx				1.97	776		3057
7	A	Damian Warner	Canada	–	–	–	–	–	–	–	xo	o	xo	xxx				1.97	776		3579
8	A	Leonel Suárez	Cuba	–	–	–	–	–	o	–	xo	o	xxo	xxx				1.97	776		3075
9	A	Gerson Izaguirre	Venezuela	–	–	–	xo	–	o	o	o	xxo	xxx					1.94	749		3069
10	B	José Lemos	Colombia	–	–	–	xo	–	xo	xxo	xxx							1.88	696	SB	2998
11	B	Geormi Jaramillo	Venezuela	–	–	o	xo	o	o	xxx								1.85	670	SB	3258
12	B	Nathan Hite	United States	–	–	–	o	o	xo	xxx								1.85	670		3029
	B	Kurt Felix	Grenada															NM	0		774

=== 400 metres ===
Rank	Heat	Name	Nationality	Time	Points	Notes	Total
1	1	Pierce LePage	Canada	47.74	922	SB	4418
2	1	Damian Warner	Canada	47.77	920		4499
3	1	Nathan Hite	United States	48.74	874		3903
4	1	Geormi Jaramillo	Venezuela	48.91	866	SB	4124
5	1	Lindon Victor	Grenada	49.28	848		4252
6	2	Briander Rivero	Cuba	50.26	803	SB	3860
7	1	Gerson Izaguirre	Venezuela	50.78	779		3848
8	1	Leonel Suárez	Cuba	50.79	779		3854
9	2	Ken Mullings	Bahamas	50.88	774	SB	3935
10	2	Jefferson Santos	Brazil	51.01	769	SB	3932
11	2	José Lemos	Colombia	52.70	694		3692
	2	Andy Preciado	Ecuador	DNF	0		3109
	2	Kurt Felix	Grenada			DNS	DNF

=== 110 metres hurdles ===
Wind:
Heat 1: -0.6 m/s, Heat 2: +1.4 m/s

Rank	Heat	Name	Nationality	Time	Points	Notes	Total
1	1	Damian Warner	Canada	13.68	1016		5515
2	1	Pierce LePage	Canada	14.15	955		5373
3	1	Geormi Jaramillo	Venezuela	14.27	940		5064
4	1	Ken Mullings	Bahamas	14.42	921		4856
5	1	Gerson Izaguirre	Venezuela	14.54	906		4754
6	1	Briander Rivero	Cuba	14.66	891		4751
7	2	Leonel Suárez	Cuba	14.81	873	SB	4727
8	2	José Lemos	Colombia	15.00	850		4542
9	2	Lindon Victor	Grenada	15.01	848		5100
10	2	Nathan Hite	United States	15.04	845		4748
11	1	Jefferson Santos	Brazil	15.37	805		4737
	2	Andy Preciado	Ecuador			DNS	DNF

=== Discus throw ===
Rank	Name	Nationality	#1	#2	#3	Mark	Points	Notes	Total
1	Lindon Victor	Grenada	x	x	50.83	50.83	888		5988
2	Damian Warner	Canada	48.82	46.65	45.81	48.82	846	SB	6361
3	José Lemos	Colombia	48.82	x	x	48.82	846	SB	5388
4	Geormi Jaramillo	Venezuela	45.36	44.60	43.45	45.36	774	SB	5838
5	Leonel Suárez	Cuba	41.39	43.25	x	43.25	731		5458
6	Jefferson Santos	Brazil	42.51	42.95	x	42.95	725		5462
7	Ken Mullings	Bahamas	40.15	x	41.25	41.25	690	SB	5546
8	Briander Rivero	Cuba	x	41.05	x	41.05	686		5437
9	Gerson Izaguirre	Venezuela	40.40	39.33	38.40	40.40	673	SB	5427
10	Nathan Hite	United States	39.47	x	34.06	39.47	654		5402
11	Pierce LePage	Canada	33.46	38.85	36.39	38.85	641		6014
	Andy Preciado	Ecuador						DNS	DNF

=== Pole vault ===
Rank	Group	Name	Nationality	3.60	3.70	3.80	3.90	4.00	4.10	4.20	4.30	4.40	4.50	4.60	4.70	4.80	4.90	5.00	5.10	5.20	Mark	Points	Notes	Total
1	A	Pierce LePage	Canada	–	–	–	–	–	–	–	–	–	o	–	xo	–	o	xo	o	xxx	5.10	941		6955
2	A	Lindon Victor	Grenada	–	–	–	–	–	–	–	–	o	o	o	o	xo	xo	xxx			4.90	880	=PB	6868
3	A	Gerson Izaguirre	Venezuela	–	–	–	–	–	–	–	o	–	o	xxo	xxx						4.60	790	PB	6217
4	A	Leonel Suárez	Cuba	–	–	–	–	–	–	–	o	o	o	xxx							4.50	760		6218
5	A	Nathan Hite	United States	–	–	–	–	–	–	o	o	xo	xo	xxx							4.50	760		6162
6	A	Geormi Jaramillo	Venezuela	–	–	–	–	–	–	–	o	o	xxx								4.40	731	=SB	6569
6	A	Damian Warner	Canada	–	–	–	–	–	–	–	–	o	–	xxx							4.40	731		7092
8	B	Ken Mullings	Bahamas	o	–	xo	–	xo	o	xo	o	o	xxx								4.40	731	PB	6277
9	B	José Lemos	Colombia	–	–	o	–	xo	xo	o	xxx										4.20	673	=PB	6061
10	B	Jefferson Santos	Brazil	–	–	–	–	–	–	xo	–	xxx									4.20	673	=SB	6135
11	B	Briander Rivero	Cuba	–	–	–	xo	o	xo	xxx											4.10	645		6082
	B	Andy Preciado	Ecuador																				DNS	DNF

=== Javelin throw ===
Rank	Name	Nationality	#1	#2	#3	Mark	Points	Notes	Total
1	Leonel Suárez	Cuba	66.45	67.60	69.15	69.15	876		7094
2	José Lemos	Colombia	62.69	64.23	59.21	64.23	802		6863
3	Lindon Victor	Grenada	57.24	55.26	62.26	62.26	772		7640
4	Geormi Jaramillo	Venezuela	59.86	56.02	55.30	59.86	736	SB	7305
5	Damian Warner	Canada	56.34	59.48	x	59.48	730		7822
6	Ken Mullings	Bahamas	51.11	57.18	54.55	57.18	696	SB	6973
7	Pierce LePage	Canada	51.31	52.13	54.57	54.57	656		7611
8	Gerson Izaguirre	Venezuela	47.33	51.74	54.23	54.23	651		6868
9	Jefferson Santos	Brazil	51.49	49.19	51.85	51.85	616		6751
10	Nathan Hite	United States	46.35	51.64	49.03	51.64	613		6775
11	Briander Rivero	Cuba	50.72	x	45.53	50.72	599		6681
	Andy Preciado	Ecuador						DNS	DNF

=== 1500 metres ===
Rank	Name	Nationality	Time	Points	Notes	Total
1	Leonel Suárez	Cuba	4:36.16	705		7799
2	Damian Warner	Canada	4:38.31	691		8513
3	Nathan Hite	United States	4:50.81	614		7389
4	Geormi Jaramillo	Venezuela	4:51.77	608	SB	7913
5	Lindon Victor	Grenada	4:53.15	600	SB	8240
6	Jefferson Santos	Brazil	4:58.96	566		7317
7	Briander Rivero	Cuba	5:00.24	558		7239
8	Pierce LePage	Canada	5:01.67	550		8161
9	Gerson Izaguirre	Venezuela	5:02.21	547		7415
10	José Lemos	Colombia	5:02.53	545	SB	7408
11	Ken Mullings	Bahamas	5:02.79	544		7517
	Andy Preciado	Ecuador			DNS	DNF

=== Final standings ===
Rank	Athlete	Nationality	Points	Notes
1st place, gold medalist(s)	Damian Warner	Canada	8513	
2nd place, silver medalist(s)	Lindon Victor	Grenada	8240	
3rd place, bronze medalist(s)	Pierce LePage	Canada	8161	
4	Geormi Jaramillo	Venezuela	7913	SB
5	Leonel Suárez	Cuba	7799	
6	Ken Mullings	Bahamas	7517	PB
7	Gerson Izaguirre	Venezuela	7415	
8	José Lemos	Colombia	7408	
9	Nathan Hite	United States	7389	
10	Jefferson Santos	Brazil	7317	
11	Briander Rivero	Cuba	7239	
	Andy Preciado	Ecuador		DNF
	Kurt Felix	Grenada		DNF
