= Saint Lucia at the 2023 Pan American Games =

- IOC code: LCA
- NOC: Saint Lucia Olympic Committee

in Santiago, Chile 20 October 2023 – 5 November 2023
- Competitors: 4 in 3 sports
- Flag bearer (opening): Luc Chevrier
- Flag bearer (closing): Luc Chevrier
- Medals: Gold 0 Silver 0 Bronze 0 Total 0

Pan American Games appearances (overview)
- 1995; 1999; 2003; 2007; 2011; 2015; 2019; 2023

Saint Lucia competed at the 2023 Pan American Games in Santiago, Chile from October 20 to November 5, 2023. This was Saint Lucia's 8th appearance at the Pan American Games, having competed at every edition of the Games since 1995.

On October 13, the Saint Lucia Olympic Committee announced a team of four athletes (three men and one woman) competing in three sports. Sailor athlete Luc Chevrier was the country's flagbearers during the opening ceremony. Meanwhile, Chevrier was also the country's flagbearer during the closing ceremony.

== Competitors ==
The following is the list of number of competitors (per gender) participating at the games per sport/discipline.

Sport	Men	Women	Total
Athletics	1	1	2
Sailing	1	0	1
Swimming	1	0	1
Total	3	1	4

== Athletics ==
Saint Lucia qualified two track and field athletes, one per gender.

Key

- Note–Ranks given for track events are within the athlete's heat only
- Q = Qualified for the next round
- q = Qualified for the next round as a fastest loser
- Bye = Athlete not required to compete in round

Track and road events

Athlete	Event	Semifinals		Final	
Athlete	Event	Result	Rank	Result	Rank
Delan Edwin	Men's 200 m	21.62	14	Did not advance	
Naomi London	Women's 200 m	24.33	12	Did not advance	

== Sailing ==
Saint Lucia qualified one boat (one male sailor).

Men

Athlete	Event	Opening series												Finals		
Athlete	Event	1	2	3	4	5	6	7	8	9	10	Points	Rank	M	Points	Rank
Luc Chevrier	Laser	12	4	10	11	10	5	10	12	9	~~14~~	83	10	Did not advance		

== Swimming ==
Saint Lucia qualified one male swimmer.

Key

- Note – Ranks given are for the entire round
- NR – National record
- Q – Qualified to the medal final
- q – Qualified to the non-medal final

Men

Athlete	Event	Heat		Final	
Athlete	Event	Time	Rank	Time	Rank
Jayhan Odlum-Smith	100 m freestyle	52.01	21	Did not advance	
Jayhan Odlum-Smith	100 m butterfly	56.56	22	Did not advance	

== Non-competing sports ==
=== Table tennis ===
Saint Lucia received a wildcard to send one male table tennis athlete. Ultimately this quota was not used.

== See also ==
- Saint Lucia at the 2024 Summer Olympics
