= Taekwondo at the 2011 Pan American Games – Qualification =

Qualification was done at the 2011 Pan American Games Qualification Tournament in Lima, Peru between March 25 and 26, 2011. The tournament was a knockout tournament, in which the final placements were not determined. There is also a further eight spots available as wildcards.

== Qualification summary ==
The following countries qualified athletes:

Nation	58kg Men	68kg Men	80kg Men	80+kg Men	49kg Women	57kg Women	67kg Women	67+kg Women	Total
Argentina		X	X	X		X	X	X	6
Aruba	X		X						2
Barbados		X							1
Bolivia					X				1
Brazil	X	X	X		X		X	X	6
Canada	X	X	X	X	X	X	X	X	8
Chile		X	X			X	X		4
Colombia	X		X	X	X	X	X	X	7
Costa Rica	X			X			X		3
Cuba	X	X	X	X	X	X	X	X	8
Dominican Republic	X	X	X		X	X	X	X	7
Ecuador		X			X				2
El Salvador						X			1
Grenada							X		1
Guatemala	X	X	X	X	X	X			6
Guyana				X					1
Haiti				X					1
Honduras				X	X				2
Jamaica		X		X					2
Mexico	X	X	X	X	X	X	X	X	8
Netherlands Antilles	X								1
Nicaragua			X						1
Panama	X				X				2
Paraguay		X							1
Peru		X			X	X			3
Puerto Rico		X		X	X	X	X	X	6
Suriname				X					1
Trinidad and Tobago			X						1
United States	X	X	X	X	X	X	X	X	8
Uruguay	X								1
Venezuela	X	X	X	X		X	X		6
Virgin Islands			X						1
Total athletes	14	16	15	15	14	13	13	9	109
Total NOCs	14	16	15	15	14	13	13	9	32 NOCs

== Qualification category ==
=== -58kg Men ===
Competition	Location	Vacancies	Qualified
Host Nation	-	1	Mexico
2011 Pan American Games Qualification Tournament	(Peru) Lima	12	Aruba; Brazil; Canada; Colombia; Costa Rica; Cuba; Dominican Republic; Guatemala; Panama; Uruguay; United States; Venezuela
Wild Card	-	1	Netherlands Antilles
TOTAL		14	

=== -68kg Men ===
Competition	Location	Vacancies	Qualified
Host Nation	-	1	Mexico
2011 Pan American Games Qualification Tournament	(Peru) Lima	12	Argentina; Brazil; Canada; Chile; Cuba; Dominican Republic; Ecuador; Guatemala; Jamaica; Puerto Rico; United States; Venezuela
Wild Card	-	3	Barbados; Paraguay; Peru
TOTAL		16	

=== -80kg Men ===
Competition	Location	Vacancies	Qualified
Host Nation	-	1	Mexico
2011 Pan American Games Qualification Tournament	(Peru) Lima	12	Argentina; Aruba; Brazil; Canada; Chile; Colombia; Cuba; Dominican Republic; Guatemala; Trinidad and Tobago; United States; Venezuela
Wild Card	-	2	Virgin Islands; Nicaragua
TOTAL		15	

=== -80+kg Men ===
Competition	Location	Vacancies	Qualified
Host Nation	-	1	Mexico
2011 Pan American Games Qualification Tournament	(Peru) Lima	12	Argentina; Canada; Colombia; Costa Rica; Cuba; Ecuador; Guatemala; Guyana; Jamaica; Puerto Rico; United States; Venezuela
Wild Card	-	2	Haiti; Suriname
TOTAL		15	

=== -49kg Women ===
Competition	Location	Vacancies	Qualified
Host Nation	-	1	Mexico
2011 Pan American Games Qualification Tournament	(Peru) Lima	12	Brazil; Canada; Colombia; Cuba; Dominican Republic; Ecuador; Guatemala; Honduras; Panama; Peru; Puerto Rico; United States
Wild Card	-	1	Bolivia
TOTAL		14	

=== -57kg Women ===
Competition	Location	Vacancies	Qualified
Host Nation	-	1	Mexico
2011 Pan American Games Qualification Tournament	(Peru) Lima	12	Argentina; Canada; Chile; Colombia; Cuba; Dominican Republic; El Salvador; Guatemala; Peru; Puerto Rico; United States; Venezuela
TOTAL		13	

=== -67kg Women ===
Competition	Location	Vacancies	Qualified
Host Nation	-	1	Mexico
2011 Pan American Games Qualification Tournament	(Peru) Lima	12	Argentina; Brazil; Canada; Chile; Colombia; Costa Rica; Cuba; Dominican Republic; Grenada; Puerto Rico; United States; Venezuela
TOTAL		13	

=== 67+kg Women ===
Competition	Location	Vacancies	Qualified
Host Nation	-	1	Mexico
2011 Pan American Games Qualification Tournament	(Peru) Lima	8	Argentina Brazil; Canada; Colombia; Cuba; Dominican Republic; Puerto Rico; United States
TOTAL		9	

- Due to the nature of the tournament, in which the final placements are not determined, the nations are listed in alphabetical order.
