= Saint Lucia at the 2019 Pan American Games =

- IOC code: LCA
- NOC: Saint Lucia Olympic Committee

in Lima, Peru 26 July–11 August, 2019
- Competitors: 7 in 3 sports
- Flag bearer: Luc Chevrier
- Medals Ranked 22nd: Gold 1 Silver 0 Bronze 1 Total 2

Pan American Games appearances (overview)
- 1995; 1999; 2003; 2007; 2011; 2015; 2019; 2023

Saint Lucia competed at the 2019 Pan American Games in Lima, Peru from July 26 to August 11, 2019.

David Christopher of Saint Lucia's boxing federation's president served as the chef de mission.

On July 18, 2019, the Saint Lucia Olympic Committee named a team of seven athletes (three men and four women) competing in three sports.

During the opening ceremony of the games, sailor Luc Chevrier carried the flag of the country as part of the parade of nations.

== Competitors ==
The following is the list of number of competitors (per gender) participating at the games per sport/discipline.

Sport	Men	Women	Total
Athletics (track and field)	1	3	4
Sailing	1	1	1
Swimming	1	0	1
Total	3	4	7

== Medalists ==
The following competitors from Saint Lucia won medals at the games. In the by discipline sections below, medalists' names are bolded.

Medal	Name	Sport	Event	Date
Gold	Levern Spencer	Athletics	Women's high jump	August 8
Bronze	Albert Reynolds	Athletics	Men's javelin	August 10

== Athletics (track and field) ==
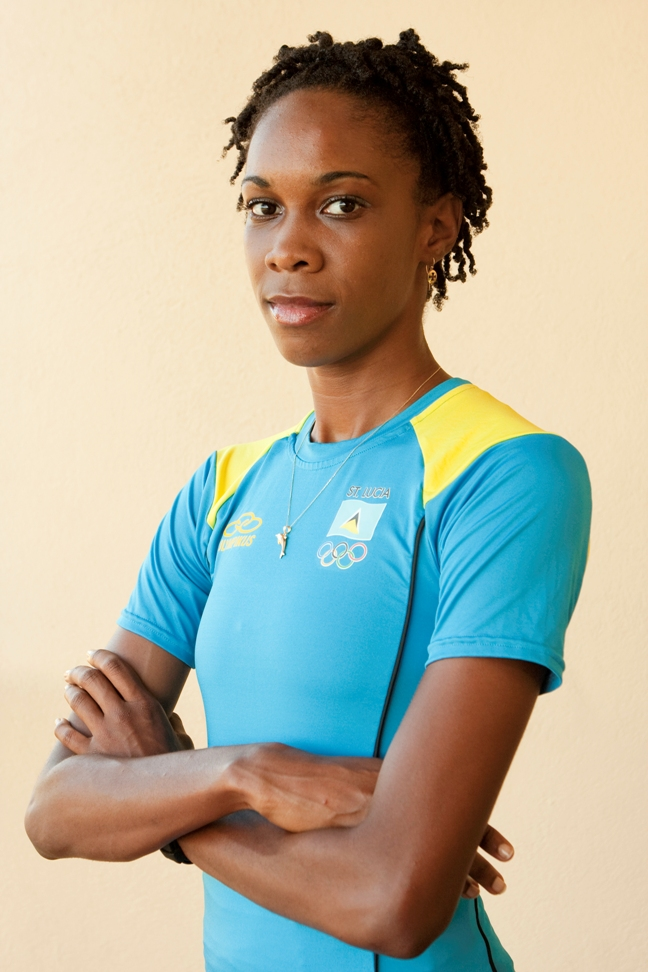
Levern Spencer defended her title from four years prior in Toronto.

Saint Lucia qualified four track and field athletes (one man and three women). Both of Saint Lucia's medals were won in the sport. Levern Spencer defended her title from four years prior in Toronto. While Albert Reynolds won bronze in the javelin throw on the penultimate day of competition. Both athletes were awarded with cash prizes for their performances after the games.

Key

- Note–Ranks given for track events are for the entire round
- **NR** = National record

Field events

Athlete	Event	Final	
Athlete	Event	Distance	Position
**Albert Reynolds**	Men's javelin throw	82.19 **NR**	3rd place, bronze medalist(s)
Jeanelle Scheper	Women's high jump	1.84	4
**Levern Spencer**	Women's high jump	1.87	1st place, gold medalist(s)
Sandisha Antoine	Women's triple jump	13.15	12

== Sailing ==
Saint Lucia qualified two sailors (one male and one female).

Athlete	Event	Race											Net points	Final rank
Athlete	Event	1	2	3	4	5	6	7	8	9	10	M	Net points	Final rank
Luc Chevrier	Men's laser	14	11	7	16	15	17	14	14	17	15	Did not advance	123	15
Stephanie Devaux-Lovell	Women's laser radial	3	6	5	13	12	8	12	15	10	11	Did not advance	80	11

== Swimming ==
Saint Lucia received one universality spot in swimming to enter one man.

Key

- Note – Ranks given are for the entire round
- **QB** – Qualified for the B final

Men

Athlete	Event	Heat		Final	
Athlete	Event	Time	Rank	Time	Rank
Jean-Luc Zephir	50 m freestyle	23.84	23	Did not advance	
Jean-Luc Zephir	100 m freestyle	51.77	18 **QB**	51.94	15

== See also ==
- Saint Lucia at the 2020 Summer Olympics
