= Sailing at the 2023 Pan American Games – ILCA 7 =

ILCA 7 at the 2023 Pan American Games
- Venue: Cofradia Nautica del Pacifico
- Dates: October 28 - November 4
- Competitors: 22 from 21 nations

Medalists
Gold medal	Stefano Peschiera	Peru
Silver medal	Clemente Seguel	Chile
Bronze medal	Juan Maegli	Independent Athletes Team

The ILCA 7 competition of the sailing events at the 2023 Pan American Games in Santiago was held from October 28 to November 4 at the Cofradia Nautica del Pacifico.

Points were assigned based on the finishing position in each race (1 for first, 2 for second, etc.). The points were totaled from the top 9 results of the first 10 races, with lower totals being better. If a sailor was disqualified or did not complete the race, 23 points were assigned for that race (as there were 22 sailors in this competition). The top 5 sailors at that point competed in the final race, with placings counting double for final score. The sailor with the lowest total score won.

Stefano Peschiera from Peru dominated the regatta to finish ahead of his opponents for the title. Clemente Seguel from Chile was the runner-up and Juan Maegli received the bronze medal.

== Schedule ==
All times are (UTC-3).

Date	Time	Round
October 28, 2023	13:56	Races 1 and 2
October 30, 2023	12:57	Races 3, 4 and 5
October 31, 2023	14:53	Race 6
November 1, 2023	14:06	Races 7 and 8
November 2, 2023	15:54	Races 9 and 10
November 4, 2023	12:05	Medal race

== Results ==
The results were as below.
Race M is the medal race.

Rank	Athlete	Nation	Race											Total Points	Net Points
Rank	Athlete	Nation	1	2	3	4	5	6	7	8	9	10	M	Total Points	Net Points
1st place, gold medalist(s)	Stefano Peschiera	Peru	2	8	1	2	2	4	1	7	2	1	4	34	26
2nd place, silver medalist(s)	Clemente Seguel	Chile	7	(16)	2	1	4	3	8	2	3	2	8	56	40
3rd place, bronze medalist(s)	Juan Maegli	Independent Athletes Team	4	5	(7)	4	3	7	3	1	5	3	6	48	41
4	Francisco Rigonat	Argentina	(8)	6	6	3	1	1	7	4	8	6	2	52	44
5	Bruno Fontes	Brazil	5	1	4	6	6	2	(9)	6	4	4	11; STP	58	49
6	Pedro Gamboa	Puerto Rico	1	3	5	7	7	8	5	9	(11)	5	—N/a	61	50
7	Just van Aanholt	Aruba	9	2	12	(15)	15	6	12	3	1	7	—N/a	82	67
8	Fillah Karim	Canada	3	10	13	9	5	9	(15)	8	7	8	—N/a	87	72
9	Matías Dyck	Ecuador	10	12	8	10	8	12	(17)	5	6	10	—N/a	98	81
10	Luc Chevrier	Saint Lucia	12	4	10	11	10	5	10	12	9	(14)	—N/a	97	83
11	Enrique Arathoon	El Salvador	13	9	3	5	9	(16)	16	10	10	9	—N/a	100	84
12	Campbell Patton	Bermuda	6	7	9	12	12	10	4	13	(15)	11	—N/a	99	84
13	Chapman Petersen	United States	11	11	11	8	11	11	2	11	(14)	13	—N/a	103	89
14	Thad Lettsome	British Virgin Islands	14	(17)	16	14	13	15	6	14	13	12	—N/a	134	117
15	Ricardo Seguel	Chile	15	13	14	13	14	13	13	17	16	21	—N/a	149	128
16	Jules Mitchell	Antigua and Barbuda	(19); STP	14	15	16	16	14	18	16	12	19	—N/a	159	140
17	Joshua Higgins	Bahamas	17	15	17	19	19	20	(23); DSQ	15	17	15	—N/a	177	154
18	Mathieu Dale	Virgin Islands	(20)	20; STP	20	17	17	18	12; STP	18	20	18	—N/a	180	160
19	Dennier Pupo	Cuba	16	(21)	18	18	18	17	20	21	18	16	—N/a	183	162
20	Scott Gittens	Barbados	19	20	(22)	21	22	21	14	20	22	17	—N/a	198	176
21	Stéfano Morel	Uruguay	(22); STP	22	21	20	20	19	19	19	21	22	—N/a	205	183
22	Trent Hardwick	Belize	22	18	19	22	21	(23); RET	21	22	19	20	—N/a	207	184
