= Keron =

Keron is both a given name and a surname.

Notable people with the given name include:

- Keron Cottoy (born 1989), Vincentian cricketer
- Keron Cummings (born 1988), Trinidad and Tobago soccer player
- Keron DeShields (born 1992), American basketball player in the Israeli National League
- Keron Grant (born 1976), Jamaican-American comic book artist
- Keron Henry (born 1982), American football player
- Keron Thomas (1975–2013), Trinidad and Tobago motorman
- Keron Toussaint (born 1989), Grenadian sprinter
- Keron Williams (born 1984), Jamaican football player

Notable people with the surname include:

- Neil Keron (born 1953), British rower

== See also ==
- Keroun, Kanepokhari
