= Sailing at the 2019 Pan American Games – Qualification =

The following is the qualification system and summary of the sailing at the 2019 Pan American Games competition.

== Qualification system ==
On January 17, 2019, it was announced that an 11th medal event (the 49er for men) was added to the list of medal events, with two additional boats being added in the Nacra 17 event. This meant the total quota rose to 168 sailors and 116 boats overall, with each nation allowed to enter a maximum of 17 athletes. The host nation (Peru) automatically qualified in all eleven events (17 athletes). Each event will have different qualifying events that began in 2017.

Originally, a total of 148 sailors and 106 boats were scheduled to qualify to compete at the games. A nation was allowed to enter a maximum of one boat in each of the ten events and a maximum of 15 athletes.

| Event | Host NOC | Other NOC's | Boats | Athletes |
|---|---|---|---|---|
| RS:X men | 1 | 7 | 8 | 8 |
| Laser standard men | 1 | 21 | 21 | 22 |
| 49er men | 1 | 7 | 8 | 16 |
| RS:X women | 1 | 7 | 8 | 8 |
| Laser radial women | 1 | 17 | 18 | 18 |
| 49erFX women | 1 | 4 | 5 | 10 |
| Sunfish open | 1 | 12 | 13 | 13 |
| Kites open | 1 | 9 | 10 | 10 |
| Snipe mixed | 1 | 9 | 10 | 20 |
| Lightning mixed | 1 | 6 | 7 | 21 |
| Nacra 17 mixed | 1 | 10 | 11 | 22 |
| TOTAL | 11 | 105 | 116 | 168 |

== Qualification summary ==
The following qualification summary and countries qualified per event are as of May 15, 2019 (after all spots have been allocated). A total of 26 nations qualified for the sailing competitions, the most ever for one single edition of the games.

| Nation | Men | | | Women | | | Open | | | | | Total | |
| Nation | RS:X | Laser | 49er | RS:X | Laser Radial | 49erFX | Sunfish | Kites | Snipe | Lightning | Nacra 17 | Boats | Athletes |
|---|---|---|---|---|---|---|---|---|---|---|---|---|---|
| Antigua and Barbuda | | X | | | X | | | X | | | | 3 | 3 |
| Argentina | X | X | X | X | X | X | X | X | X | X | X | 11 | 17 |
| Aruba | X | X | | | X | | | | | | | 3 | 3 |
| Barbados | | | | | X | | | | | | | 1 | 1 |
| Bermuda | | X | | | | | | | | | X | 2 | 3 |
| Brazil | X | X | X | X | X | X | X | X | X | X | X | 11 | 17 |
| British Virgin Islands | | X | | | | | | | | | | 1 | 1 |
| Canada | | X | X | X | X | X | X | X | | X | X | 9 | 14 |
| Cayman Islands | | X | | | | | | | | | | 1 | 1 |
| Chile | | X | X | | X | | X | | X | X | X | 7 | 12 |
| Colombia | | X | | | | | X | X | | X | | 4 | 6 |
| Cuba | X | X | | X | X | | X | | X | | | 6 | 7 |
| Dominican Republic | | | | | | | X | X | | | | 2 | 2 |
| Ecuador | | X | | | X | | X | | X | X | | 5 | 8 |
| El Salvador | | X | | | | | | | | | | 1 | 1 |
| Guatemala | | X | | | X | | X | | X | | X | 5 | 7 |
| Mexico | X | X | X | X | X | | X | X | | | | 7 | 8 |
| Paraguay | | X | | | | | | | | | | 1 | 1 |
| Peru | X | X | X | X | X | X | X | X | X | X | X | 11 | 17 |
| Puerto Rico | | | | | | | X | | X | | X | 3 | 5 |
| Saint Lucia | | X | | | X | | | | | | | 2 | 2 |
| Trinidad and Tobago | | X | | | X | | | | | | | 2 | 2 |
| United States | X | X | X | X | X | X | X | X | X | X | X | 11 | 17 |
| Uruguay | | X | X | | X | | | X | X | | X | 6 | 9 |
| Venezuela | X | X | | X | X | | | | | | X | 5 | 6 |
| Virgin Islands | | | | | X | | | | | | | 1 | 1 |
| Total: 26 NOCs | 8 | 22 | 8 | 8 | 18 | 5 | 13 | 10 | 10 | 7 | 11 | 120 | 168 |

== Qualified boats ==
=== RS:X men ===
| Event | Location | Date | Boats | Qualified |
|---|---|---|---|---|
| Host nation | —N/a | —N/a | 1 | Peru |
| 2018 South American Championship | (Peru) Paracas | March 1 – March 4 | 4 | Aruba; Brazil; Argentina; Venezuela |
| 2018 North American Championship | (Mexico) Cancun | May 23 – May 27 | ~~4~~ 3 | Mexico; United States; ~~Canada~~ |
| Universality | —N/a | —N/a | 1 | Cuba |
| TOTAL | | | 8 | |

- Canada declined its quota, and it was awarded to Cuba as a universality spot.

=== Laser standard men ===
| Event | Location | Date | Boats | Qualified |
|---|---|---|---|---|
| Host nation | —N/a | —N/a | 1 | Peru |
| 2018 South American Championship | (Chile) Rapel Lake | February 21 – February 25 | 2 | Argentina; Brazil; Trinidad and Tobago |
| 2018 North American Championship | (United States) Alamitos Bay | July 12 – July 15 | 6 | United States; Guatemala; Canada; Mexico; El Salvador; Saint Lucia |
| 2019 South American Championship | (Peru) Paracas | March 4 – March 9 | 3 | Ecuador; Colombia; Uruguay; Chile |
| Universality | —N/a | April 11, 2019 | ~~2~~ 8 | Aruba; Bermuda; British Virgin Islands; Paraguay; Antigua and Barbuda; Cayman Islands; Cuba; Venezuela |
| TOTAL | | | 22 | |

- 4 additional universality spots were awarded after reallocation to the last four nations listed above.

=== 49er men ===
| Event | Location | Date | Boats | Qualified |
|---|---|---|---|---|
| Host nation | —N/a | —N/a | 1 | Peru |
| 2019 North American Championship | (United States) Miami | January 27 – February 3 | 3 | Canada; United States; Mexico |
| Universality | —N/a | —N/a | ~~5~~4 | Argentina; Brazil; Chile; ~~Trinidad and Tobago~~; Uruguay |
| TOTAL | | | 8 | |

- Trinidad and Tobago declined its spot and the two athlete spots were reallocated to the men's laser event.

=== RS:X women ===
| Event | Location | Date | Boats | Qualified |
|---|---|---|---|---|
| Host nation | —N/a | —N/a | 1 | Peru |
| 2018 South American Championship | (Peru) Paracas | March 1 – March 4 | 2 | Argentina; Brazil |
| 2018 North American Championship | (Mexico) Cancun | May 23 – May 27 | ~~5~~ 4 | Mexico; United States; Cuba; Canada |
| Reallocation | —N/a | April 11, 2019 | 1 | Venezuela |
| TOTAL | | | 8 | |

- Only 4 eligible countries competed at the 2018 North American Championship, meaning the last spot is yet to be determined.

=== Laser radial women ===
| Event | Location | Date | Boats | Qualified |
|---|---|---|---|---|
| Host nation | —N/a | —N/a | 1 | Peru |
| 2018 South American Championship | (Chile) Rapel Lake | February 21 – February 25 | 2 | Argentina; Uruguay |
| 2018 North American Championship | (United States) Alamitos Bay | July 12 – July 15 | ~~7~~ 6 | Canada; United States; Mexico; Guatemala; Saint Lucia; ~~Puerto Rico~~; Cuba |
| 2019 South American Championship | (Peru) Paracas | February 27 – March 3 | 3 | Brazil; Trinidad and Tobago; Chile; Venezuela |
| Universality | —N/a | April 11, 2019 | ~~2~~ 5 | Barbados; ~~Colombia~~; Ecuador; Virgin Islands; Aruba; Antigua and Barbuda |
| TOTAL | | | 18 | |

- Puerto Rico and Colombia declined their spots. These two spots were awarded as universality spots to Aruba and Antigua and Barbuda

=== 49erFX women ===
| Event | Location | Date | Boats | Qualified |
|---|---|---|---|---|
| Host nation | —N/a | —N/a | 1 | Peru |
| 2019 Pan-American Championship | (United States) Miami | January 27 – February 3 | ~~7~~ 4 | Argentina; Brazil; Canada; United States |
| Universality | —N/a | —N/a | ~~2~~ | —N/a |
| TOTAL | | | ~~8~~ 5 | |

- No eligible boat competed in the 2018 South American Championship, therefore the quotas are transferred to the other qualifying tournament.
- The eighth boat was reallocated to the Nacra event.
- Two additional boat spots were allocated, with two athlete quotas each being reallocated to the laser and laser radial events as universality spots.

=== Sunfish open ===
| Event | Location | Date | Boats | Qualified |
|---|---|---|---|---|
| Host nation | —N/a | —N/a | 1 | Peru |
| 2018 Midwinter Championship | (United States) Panama City | March 21 – March 23 | 3 | Guatemala; Argentina; Ecuador |
| 2018 South American & Caribbean Championship | (Colombia) Barranquilla | April 28 – May 1 | 2 | Puerto Rico; Cuba |
| 2018 North American Championship | (United States) Waukegan | August 1 – August 4 | 3 | United States; Mexico; Colombia |
| 2019 South American Championship | (Peru) Paracas | February 27 – March 3 | 3 | Canada; Brazil; Chile |
| Universality | —N/a | May 15, 2019 | 1 | Dominican Republic |
| TOTAL | | | 13 | |

=== Kites open ===
| Event | Location | Date | Boats | Qualified |
|---|---|---|---|---|
| Host nation | —N/a | —N/a | 1 | Peru |
| 2018 North American Championship | (United States) San Diego | November 8 – November 11 | 5 | Canada; Mexico; Dominican Republic; Antigua and Barbuda** |
| 2018 North American Championship | (United States) San Diego | November 8 – November 11 | 5 | United States |
| 2018 South American Championship | (Brazil) Florianópolis | November 18 – November 24 | 4 | —N/a |
| 2018 South American Championship | (Brazil) Florianópolis | November 18 – November 24 | 4 | Uruguay; Brazil; Argentina; Colombia |
| Reallocation | —N/a | —N/a | ~~2~~ | —N/a |
| TOTAL | | | 10 | |

- For the North American Championship the top four in the men's competition will qualify, along with the top two women. Only one woman competed and was eligible for a spot.
- For the South American Championship the top three in the men's competition will qualify, along with the top two women. Only two eligible nations competed at the event.
- If a country qualifies in both events, the men's competition will take precedence.
- ** Antigua and Barbuda was awarded an additional spot as the only non-qualified country at the conclusion of qualifiers.
- The last two quotas were reallocated as one boat to the 49er event.

=== Snipe mixed ===
| Event | Location | Date | Boats | Qualified |
|---|---|---|---|---|
| Host nation | —N/a | —N/a | 1 | Peru |
| 2018 South American Championship | (Brazil) Porto Alegre | March 24 – March 31 | 6 | Brazil; Uruguay; Argentina; Puerto Rico; Chile; Ecuador |
| 2018 North American Championship | (United States) San Diego | October 6 – October 8 | 3 | United States; Guatemala |
| 2018 Western Hemisphere Championship | (Argentina) Buenos Aires | October 20 – October 27 | 1 | Cuba |
| TOTAL | | | 10 | |

=== Lightning mixed ===
| Event | Location | Date | Boats | Qualified |
|---|---|---|---|---|
| Host nation | —N/a | —N/a | 1 | Peru |
| 2017 South American Championship | (Ecuador) Salinas | November 17 – November 20 | 1 | Argentina |
| 2018 North American Championship | (United States) San Diego | July 25 – July 28 | 4 | United States; Chile; Ecuador; Canada |
| 2018 South American Championship | (Chile) Pucón | January 3–6, 2019 | 2 | Brazil; Colombia |
| TOTAL | | | 8 | |

=== Nacra 17 mixed ===
| Event | Location | Date | Boats | Qualified |
|---|---|---|---|---|
| Host nation | —N/a | —N/a | 1 | Peru |
| 2018 South American Championship | (Brazil) Florianópolis | November 18 – November 24 | 3 | Brazil; Argentina; Uruguay |
| 2019 North American Championship | (United States) Miami | January 27 – February 3 | 5 | Bermuda; Canada; Guatemala; Puerto Rico; United States |
| Universality | —N/a | —N/a | 2 | Chile; Venezuela |
| TOTAL | | | 11 | |

- An extra universality spot was awarded as a boat quota was reallocated from the women's 49erfx event.
