= Grenada at the 2019 Pan American Games =

- IOC code: GRN
- NOC: Grenada Olympic Committee
- Website: www.olympic.org/grenada

in Lima, Peru 26 July–11 August, 2019
- Competitors: 11 in 3 sports
- Flag bearer: Anderson Peters (opening)
- Medals Ranked 20th: Gold 1 Silver 1 Bronze 0 Total 2

Pan American Games appearances (overview)
- 1987; 1991; 1995; 1999; 2003; 2007; 2011; 2015; 2019; 2023

Grenada competed at the 2019 Pan American Games in Lima, Peru from July 26 to August 11, 2019.

On July 16, 2019 the Grenada Olympic Committee announced a team of 11 athletes (seven men and four women) in three sports (athletics, swimming and tennis). The team will also consist of seven officials.

During the opening ceremony of the games, javelin thrower Anderson Peters carried the flag of the country as part of the parade of nations. Peters would later go on to win the country's first ever Pan American Games gold medal.

== Competitors ==
The following is the list of number of competitors (per gender) participating at the games per sport/discipline.

| Sport | Men | Women | Total |
|---|---|---|---|
| Athletics (track and field) | 6 | 2 | 8 |
| Swimming | 1 | 1 | 2 |
| Tennis | 0 | 1 | 1 |
| Total | 7 | 4 | 11 |

== Medalists ==
The following competitors from Grenada won medals at the games. In the by discipline sections below, medalists' names are bolded.

| Medal | Name | Sport | Event | Date |
|---|---|---|---|---|
| Gold | Anderson Peters | Athletics | Men's javelin throw | August 10 |
| Silver | Lindon Victor | Athletics | Men's decathlon | August 7 |

== Athletics (track and field) ==
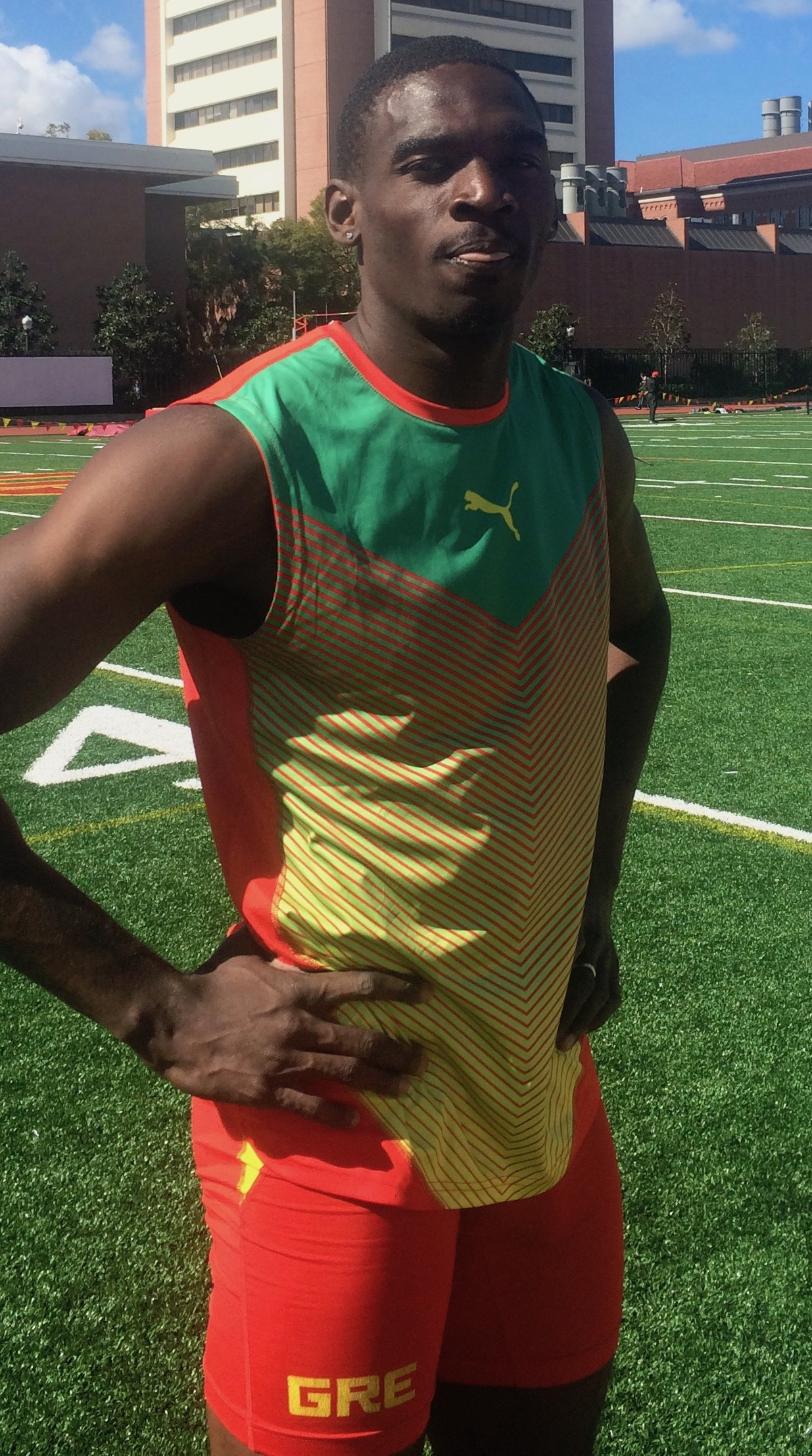
Lindon Victor took silver in the decathlon

Grenada qualified eight track and field athletes (six men and two women). The team won two medals, with Anderson Peters picking up gold in the javelin throw, and Lindon Victor picking up silver in the decathlon.

Key

- Note–Ranks given for track events are for the entire round
- **Q** = Qualified for the next round
- **NR** = National record
- **GR** = Games record
- DNF = Did not finish
- DNS = Did not start
- NM = No mark

Track

| Athlete | Event | Semifinals | | Final | |
| Athlete | Event | Result | Rank | Result | Rank |
|---|---|---|---|---|---|
| Bralon Taplin | Men's 400 m | 45.38 | 4 **Q** | 46.01 | 8 |
| Halle Hazzard | Women's 100 m | 11.70 | 12 | did not advance | |
| Halle Hazzard | Women's 200 m | 24.03 | 17 | did not advance | |
| Kanika Beckles | Women's 200 m | 23.99 | 16 | did not advance | |
| Kanika Beckles | Women's 400 m | 54.64 | 16 | did not advance | |

Field events
Men

| Athlete | Event | Final | |
| Athlete | Event | Distance | Position |
|---|---|---|---|
| Josh Boateng | Discus throw | 56.92 | 7 |
| Markim Felix | Javelin throw | 77.18 | 5 |
| **Anderson Peters** | Javelin throw | 87.31 **GR**, **NR** | 1st place, gold medalist(s) |

Combined events – Decathlon

| Athlete | Event | 100 m | LJ | SP | HJ | 400 m | 110H | DT | PV | JT | 1500 m | Final | Rank |
|---|---|---|---|---|---|---|---|---|---|---|---|---|---|
| Kurt Felix | Result | 11.40 | NM | NM | NM | DNS | | | | | | DNF | DNF |
| Kurt Felix | Points | 774 | 0 | 0 | 0 | DNF | | | | | | DNF | DNF |
| **Lindon Victor** | Result | 10.82 | 7.39 | 15.04 | 2.00 | 49.28 | 15.01 | 50.83 | 4.90 | 62.26 | 4:53.15 | 8240 | 2nd place, silver medalist(s) |
| **Lindon Victor** | Points | 901 | 908 | 792 | 803 | 848 | 848 | 888 | 880 | 772 | 600 | 8240 | 2nd place, silver medalist(s) |

== Swimming ==
Grenada received two universality spots in swimming to enter one man and one woman.

Key

- Note – Ranks given are for the entire round

| Athlete | Event | Heat | | Final | |
| Athlete | Event | Time | Rank | Time | Rank |
|---|---|---|---|---|---|
| Delron Felix | Men's 50 m freestyle | 24.84 | 30 | did not advance | |
| Delron Felix | Men's 100 m freestyle | 53.46 | 26 | did not advance | |
| Kimberly Ince | Women's 50 m freestyle | 28.72 | 26 | did not advance | |
| Kimberly Ince | Women's 100 m backstroke | 1:10.48 | 23 | did not advance | |

== Tennis ==
Grenada received one wild card to enter one female tennis player.

Women

| Athlete | Event | Round of 32 | Round of 16 | Quarterfinals | Semifinals | Final / BM | |
| Athlete | Event | Opposition Score | Opposition Score | Opposition Score | Opposition Score | Opposition Score | Rank |
|---|---|---|---|---|---|---|---|
| Akilah James | Singles | Schaefer (PER); **L** 5–7, 5–7 | did not advance | | | | |

== See also ==
- Grenada at the 2020 Summer Olympics
