= Sailing at the 2026 Central American and Caribbean Games =

- Venue: Salinas Beach
- Location: Santo Domingo, Dominican Republic
- Start date: 1 August 2026
- End date: 7 August 2026

The sailing competition at the 2026 Central American and Caribbean Games was held in Santo Domingo, Dominican Republic, from 1 to 7 August 2026 at Salinas Beach.

== Medal table ==
* Host nation (Dominican Republic)

Rank	Nation	Gold	Silver	Bronze	Total
1	Puerto Rico (PUR)	4	1	1	6
2	Aruba (ARU)	2	0	0	2
3	Mexico (MEX)	1	3	1	5
4	Venezuela (VEN)	1	0	2	3
5	Bermuda (BER)	1	0	1	2
5	Dominican Republic (DOM)*	1	0	1	2
7	Guatemala (GUA)	0	1	2	3
8	Colombia (COL)	0	1	1	2
9	Antigua and Barbuda (ATG)	0	1	0	1
9	Cuba (CUB)	0	1	0	1
9	Saint Lucia (LCA)	0	1	0	1
9	Trinidad and Tobago (TTO)	0	1	0	1
13	Bahamas (BAH)	0	0	1	1
Totals (13 entries)		10	10	10	30

== Medal summary ==
=== Men's events ===
Event	Gold	Silver	Bronze
ILCA 7	Pedro Fernández; Puerto Rico	Luc Chevrier; Saint Lucia	Sebastian Kempe; Bermuda
Sunfish	Sebastián Medina; Puerto Rico	Simón Gómez; Colombia	David Hernández; Guatemala
iQFoil	Ethan Westera; Aruba	Jerónimo Abogado; Mexico	Samuel Pérez; Dominican Republic
Formula Kite	Deury Corniel; Dominican Republic	Tiger Tyson; Antigua and Barbuda	Alec Vázquez; Mexico

=== Women's events ===
Event	Gold	Silver	Bronze
ILCA 6	Adriana Penruddocke; Bermuda	Elena Oetling; Mexico	Marina Escudero; Puerto Rico
Sunfish	Daniela Rivera; Venezuela	Kelly-Ann Arrindell; Trinidad and Tobago	Ana Sofía Bermúdez; Colombia
iQFoil	Zara Rozeboom; Aruba	Mariana Aguilar; Mexico	Carenys Salazar; Venezuela

=== Mixed events ===
Event	Gold	Silver	Bronze
i420	Mexico; Álvaro Ramírez; Sofía Baeza	Puerto Rico; Osabel Rivera; Diego Marrero	Bahamas; Mary Nash; Patrick Tomlinson
Snipe	Puerto Rico; Ramón González; Virginia Carrero	Cuba; Nélido Manso; Erika Ibáñez	Guatemala; Juan Carlos Canizalez; Marisleysis Cedeño
Hobie 16	Puerto Rico; Enrique Figueroa; Paula Figueroa	Guatemala; Jason Hess; Irene Abascal	Venezuela; Yamil Saba; Andrea Saba
