= Grenada at the 2011 Pan American Games =

- IOC code: GRN
- NOC: Grenada Olympic Committee
- Website: www.olympic.org/grenada

in Guadalajara 14–30 October 2011
- Competitors: 5 in 3 sports
- Flag bearer: Joel Redhead
- Medals: Gold 0 Silver 0 Bronze 0 Total 0

Pan American Games appearances (overview)
- 1987; 1991; 1995; 1999; 2003; 2007; 2011; 2015; 2019; 2023; 2027

Grenada competed at the 2011 Pan American Games in Guadalajara, Mexico from October 14 to 30, 2011. Grenada competed with six, later reduced to five athletes from three sports.

== Athletics ==
Grenada has qualified three athletes.

=== Track and road events ===
Event	Athletes	Heats		Semifinal		Final	
Event	Athletes	Time	Rank	Time	Rank	Time	Rank
200 m	Joel Redhead	21.60	6th	did not advance			
400 m	Keron Toussaint			1:37.36	8th	did not advance	

=== Track and road events ===
Event	Athletes	Semifinal		Final	
Event	Athletes	Result	Rank	Result	Rank
400 m	Kanika Beckles	56.43	7th	did not advance	

== Swimming ==
Grenada sent only one swimmer.

Men

Athlete	Event	Heats		Final	
Athlete	Event	Time	Rank	Time	Rank
100 m freestyle	Esau Simpson	54.73	22nd	did not advance	

== Taekwondo ==
Grenada has qualified a team of 1 female athlete.

Women

Athlete	Event	Round of 16	Quarterfinals	Semifinals	Final
Athlete	Event	Opposition Result	Opposition Result	Opposition Result	Opposition Result
Andrea St. Bernard	Flyweight (-67kg)	Carolina Acosta (MEX); L 2 - 11	did not advance		
