= Grenada at the 2003 Pan American Games =

- IOC code: GRN
- NOC: Grenada Olympic Committee
- Website: www.olympic.org/grenada

in Santo Domingo 1–17 August 2003
- Flag bearer: Hazel-Ann Regis
- Medals Ranked 22nd: Gold 0 Silver 1 Bronze 1 Total 2

Pan American Games appearances (overview)
- 1987; 1991; 1995; 1999; 2003; 2007; 2011; 2015; 2019; 2023

The 14th Pan American Games were held in Santo Domingo, Dominican Republic from August 1 to August 17, 2003.

== Medals ==
=== Silver ===
===== Athletics =====
- Women's 400 metres: Hazel-Ann Regis

=== Bronze ===
===== Athletics =====
- Men's 400 metres: Alleyne Francique

== Results by event ==
=== Athletics ===
Track

| Athlete | Event | Heat | | Final | |
| Athlete | Event | Time | Rank | Time | Rank |
|---|---|---|---|---|---|
| Shane Charles | Men's 400 m hurdles | 51.15 | 11 | — | 11 |

Field

| Athlete | Event | Throws | | | | | | Total | |
| Athlete | Event | 1 | 2 | 3 | 4 | 5 | 6 | Distance | Rank |
|---|---|---|---|---|---|---|---|---|---|
| Alleyne Lett | Men's Discus | X | 47.22 | 40.84 | — | — | — | 47.22 m | 10 |

=== Boxing ===
| Athlete | Event | Round of 16 | Quarterfinals | Semifinals | Final |
| Athlete | Event | Opposition Result | Opposition Result | Opposition Result | Opposition Result |
|---|---|---|---|---|---|
| Rayon O'Neil | Middleweight | Almonte (PUR); L 10-18 | did not advance | | |
| Andy Grant | Heavyweight | Bye | Douglas (CAN); L RSC-1 | did not advance | |

== See also ==
- Grenada at the 2004 Summer Olympics
