= Sailing at the 2026 South American Games =

Sailing competitions at the 2026 South American Games

- Venue: Club de Niños Manuel Belgrano
- Dates: September 16–20
- Competitors: 49 from 10 nations

Sailing competitions at the 2026 South American Games in Rosario, Santa Fe, and Rafaela, Argentina, were held between September 16 and 20 at Club de Niños Manuel Belgrano, located within Laguna Setúbal in Santa Fe.

A total of 7 events were contested (three men's, three women's and one mixed). The games gave qualifying quotas for the 2027 Pan American Games sailing competitions to the top two NOCs in the laser events as well as the best placed NOC for the rest of the events.

== Medal summary ==
=== Medal table ===
* Host nation (Argentina)

Rank	Nation	Gold	Silver	Bronze	Total
1	Peru	3	2	1	6
2	Brazil	2	1	1	4
3	Argentina*	1	1	4	6
4	Colombia	1	0	0	1
5	Aruba	0	2	0	2
6	Ecuador	0	1	0	1
7	Chile	0	0	1	1
Totals (7 entries)		7	7	7	21

=== Medalists ===
==== Men's events ====
Event	Gold	Silver	Bronze
Laser Standard (ILCA 7)	Stefano Peschiera; Peru	Philipp Grochtmann; Brazil	Francisco Guaragna; Argentina
Sunfish	Simón Gómez; Colombia	Jean Paul de Trazegnies; Peru	Martín Alsogaray; Argentina
IQFoil 95	Guilherme Trainini; Brazil	Kaj Rozeboom; Aruba	Joaquín Reutemann; Argentina

==== Women' events ====
Event	Gold	Silver	Bronze
Laser Radial (ILCA 6)	Lucía Falasca; Argentina	Caterina Romero; Peru	Valentina Guimarães; Brazil
Sunfish	Sophie Zimmermann; Peru	María José Cucalón; Ecuador	Constanza Olivares; Chile
IQFoil 95	María Belén Bazo; Peru	Zara Rozeboom; Aruba	Chiara Ferretti; Argentina

==== Mixed events ====
Event	Gold	Silver	Bronze
Snipe	Juliana Duque; Rafael Martins; Brazil	Luciano Pesci; Florencia Galimberti; Argentina	Ismael Muelle; María Gracia Vegas; Peru

== Participation ==
Ten nations participated in the sailing events of the 2026 South American Games.

- Argentina (8)
- Aruba (2)
- Brazil (7)
- Chile (6)
- Colombia (2)
- Ecuador (4)
- Paraguay (2)
- Peru (8)
- Uruguay (8)
- Venezuela (2)

== Results ==
=== Men's laser ===
Rank	Athlete	Nation	Race									Total Points	Net Points
Rank	Athlete	Nation	1	2	3	4	5	6	7	8	M	Total Points	Net Points
1st place, gold medalist(s)	Stephano Peschiera	Peru	1	2	1	2	1	2	1	(4)	1	11	15
2nd place, silver medalist(s)	Philipp Grochtmann	Brazil	2	1	3	3	3	3	(5)	1	3	19	24
3rd place, bronze medalist(s)	Francisco Guaragna	Argentina	3	3	2	1	2	4	2	3	(5)	20	25
4	Clemente Seguel	Chile	(5)	4	4	4	5	1	3	2	2	25	30
5	Stefano Caiafa	Uruguay	4	5	5	(6)	4	5	4	5	4	36	42
6	Joaquín Frutos	Paraguay	(6)	6	6	5	6	6	6	6	6	47	53

=== Men's sunfish ===
Rank	Athlete	Nation	Race									Total Points	Net Points
Rank	Athlete	Nation	1	2	3	4	5	6	7	8	M	Total Points	Net Points
1st place, gold medalist(s)	Simón Gómez	Colombia	(4)	3	1	2	4	2	1	1	1	15	19
2nd place, silver medalist(s)	Jean Paul de Trazegnies	Peru	6	2	2	1	(7)	1	2	5	3	22	29
3rd place, bronze medalist(s)	Martín Alsogaray	Argentina	1	1	4	3	3	6	4	2	(7)	24	31
4	Renato Brito	Chile	3	6	(8)	5	6	3	5	3	2	33	41
5	Tadas Koreiva	Ecuador	2	5	(7)	6	2	4	7	4	4	34	41
6	Felipe Franquelli	Brazil	(7)	4	3	4	1	5	6	6	6	35	42
7	Alan Mathisson	Uruguay	5	7	5	7	(8)	8	3	7	5	47	55
8	Marx Chirinos	Venezuela	8	8	6	8	5	7	(9); RET	8	8	58	67

=== Men's IQFoil 95 ===
Rank	Athlete	Nation	Race								Total Points	Net Points
Rank	Athlete	Nation	1	2	3	4	5	6	7	M	Total Points	Net Points
1st place, gold medalist(s)	Guilherme Trainini	Brazil	1	2	1.33; RDG	1	1	(6); UFD	3	1	10.33	16.33
2nd place, silver medalist(s)	Kaj Rozeboom	Aruba	2	1	2	2	2	(6); UFD	4	2	15	21
3rd place, bronze medalist(s)	Joaquín Reutemann	Argentina	4	(5)	3	3	3	1	2	3	19	24
4	Mariano Mendoza	Peru	3	4	1	4	(5)	3	1	4	20	25
5	Máximo Ortíz	Uruguay	(5)	3	4	5	4	2	5	5	28	33

=== Women's laser ===
Rank	Athlete	Nation	Race									Total Points	Net Points
Rank	Athlete	Nation	1	2	3	4	5	6	7	8	M	Total Points	Net Points
1st place, gold medalist(s)	Lucía Falasca	Argentina	2	1	(3)	1	2	2	1	2	1	12	15
2nd place, silver medalist(s)	Caterina Romero	Peru	1	3	1	3	1	1	2	1	(4)	13	17
3rd place, bronze medalist(s)	Valentina Guimaraes	Brazil	4	2	2	5	(7); DNF	7 NSC	4	5	2	31	38
4	María José Poncell	Chile	(6)	4	4	4	3	3	5	4	5	32	38
5	Paula Defazio	Uruguay	5	5	6	2	(7); DNF	4	6	3	3	34	41
6	Martina Vera	Paraguay	3	6	5	6	(7); DNF	7 NSC	3	6	6	42	49

=== Women's sunfish ===
Rank	Athlete	Nation	Race								Total Points	Net Points
Rank	Athlete	Nation	1	2	3	4	5	6	7	M	Total Points	Net Points
1st place, gold medalist(s)	Sophie Zimmermann	Peru	4	2	1	2	3	(9); OCS	3	2	17	26
2nd place, silver medalist(s)	María José Cucalón	Ecuador	(5)	3	2	1	1	2	4	5	18	23
3rd place, bronze medalist(s)	Constanza Olivares	Chile	2	1	(6)	6	5	3	2	1	20	26
4	Luciana Cardozo	Argentina	1	7	4	4	4	4	1	(8)	25	33
5	Daniela Rivera	Venezuela	6	6	(8)	3	2	1	5	6	29	37
6	Ana Sofía Bermúdez	Colombia	3	4	5	7	(9); DNF	5	6	3	33	42
7	Lucía Köster	Uruguay	(8)	8	7	5	6	6	7	4	43	51
8	Ana Carolina Roth	Brazil	7	5	3	8	(9); DNF	7	8	7	45	54

=== Women's IQFoil 95 ===
Rank	Athlete	Nation	Race							Total Points	Net Points
Rank	Athlete	Nation	1	2	3	4	5	6	M	Total Points	Net Points
1st place, gold medalist(s)	María Belén Bazo	Peru	(1)	1	1	1	1	1	1	6	7
2nd place, silver medalist(s)	Zara Rozeboom	Aruba	3	2	2	(5); OCS	2	3	2	14	19
3rd place, bronze medalist(s)	Chiara Ferretti	Argentina	2	(3)	3	2	3	2	3	15	18
4	Catalina Limogni	Uruguay	(5); DNF	5 DNC	5 DNF	5 DNC	5 DNC	5 DNC	5 DNF	30	35

=== Mixed snipe ===
Rank	Athlete	Nation	Race									Total Points	Net Points
Rank	Athlete	Nation	1	2	3	4	5	6	7	8	M	Total Points	Net Points
1st place, gold medalist(s)	Juliana Duque / Rafael Martins	Brazil	1	1	1	1	4	5	1	1	(7); DNC	15	22
2nd place, silver medalist(s)	Luciano Pesci / Florencia Galimberti	Argentina	(6)	6	2	2	1	3	3	3	2	22	28
3rd place, bronze medalist(s)	Ismael Muelle / María Gracia Vargas	Peru	4	3	3	(5)	5	4	2	4	1	26	31
4	Jonathan Martinetti / Alisson Haon	Ecuador	5	5	(6)	4	2	1	5	2	4	28	34
5	Ricardo Fabini / Marina Fabini	Uruguay	3	4	4	(6)	3	2	4	6	5	31	37
6	Matías Poncell / Trinidad Prieto	Chile	2	2	5	3	(6)	6	6	5	3	32	38
