= Grenada at the 2007 Pan American Games =

- IOC code: GRN
- NOC: Grenada Olympic Committee
- Website: www.olympic.org/grenada

in Rio de Janeiro 13–29 July 2007
- Competitors: 7
- Flag bearer: Jewel Lewis
- Medals Ranked 25th: Gold 0 Silver 0 Bronze 1 Total 1

Pan American Games appearances (overview)
- 1987; 1991; 1995; 1999; 2003; 2007; 2011; 2015; 2019; 2023

The 15th Pan American Games were held in Rio de Janeiro, Brazil from 13 July 2007 to 29 July 2007. Sprinter Sherry Fletcher won the nation's first ever medal at the Pan American Games, claiming bronze in the women's 200 metres.

== Medals ==
=== Bronze ===
===== Athletics =====
- Women's 200 metres: Sherry Fletcher

== Results by event ==
=== Triathlon ===
==== Men's Competition ====
- Marc DeCaul

- did not finish – no ranking

== See also ==
- Grenada at the 2006 Commonwealth Games
- Grenada at the 2008 Summer Olympics
