= Saint Lucia at the 2007 Pan American Games =

- IOC code: LCA
- NOC: Saint Lucia Olympic Committee
- Website: www.slunoc.org

in Rio de Janeiro 13–29 July 2007
- Competitors: 14
- Flag bearer: Henry Bailey
- Medals Ranked 25th: Gold 0 Silver 0 Bronze 1 Total 1

Pan American Games appearances (overview)
- 1995; 1999; 2003; 2007; 2011; 2015; 2019; 2023

The 15th Pan American Games were held in Rio de Janeiro, Brazil, between 13 July 2007 and 29 July 2007.

== Medals ==
=== Bronze ===
===== Athletics =====
- woman's High Jump: Levern Spencer

== See also ==
- Saint Lucia at the 2008 Summer Olympics
