= Saint Lucia at the 2003 Pan American Games =

- IOC code: LCA
- NOC: Saint Lucia Olympic Committee
- Website: www.slunoc.org

in Santo Domingo 1–17 August 2003
- Medals Ranked 28th: Gold 0 Silver 0 Bronze 1 Total 1

Pan American Games appearances (overview)
- 1995; 1999; 2003; 2007; 2011; 2015; 2019; 2023

The 14th Pan American Games were held in Santo Domingo, Dominican Republic from August 1 to August 17, 2003.

== Medals ==
=== Bronze ===
===== Athletics =====
- Men's Pole Vault: Dominic Johnson

== Results by event ==
=== Swimming ===
==== Men's Competition ====
Athlete	Event	Heat		Final	
Athlete	Event	Time	Rank	Time	Rank
Jamie Peterkin	50 m freestyle	24.59	25	did not advance	
Jamie Peterkin	100 m freestyle	54.73	33	did not advance	

== See also ==
- Saint Lucia at the 2002 Central American and Caribbean Games
- Saint Lucia at the 2004 Summer Olympics
