= Saint Lucia at the 2011 Pan American Games =

- IOC code: LCA
- NOC: Saint Lucia Olympic Committee
- Website: www.slunoc.org

in Guadalajara 14–30 October 2011
- Competitors: 4 in 3 sports
- Flag bearer: Levern Spencer
- Medals: Gold 0 Silver 0 Bronze 0 Total 0

Pan American Games appearances (overview)
- 1995; 1999; 2003; 2007; 2011; 2015; 2019; 2023

Saint Lucia competed at the 2011 Pan American Games in Guadalajara, Mexico from October 14 to 30, 2011. The Saint Lucia team was made up of four athletes in three different sports.

== Athletics ==
Saint Lucia has qualified two athletes.

=== Men ===
Field events

Event	Athletes	Semifinal		Final	
Event	Athletes	Result	Rank	Result	Rank
Pole vault	Rick Valcin			NM	

=== Women ===
Field events

Event	Athletes	Semifinal		Final	
Event	Athletes	Result	Rank	Result	Rank
High jump	Levern Spencer			1.81 m.	7th

== Cycling ==
Saint Lucia has received a wildcard to send one male cyclist.

=== Road cycling ===
Men

Athlete	Event	Time	Rank
Fidel Mangal	Men's road race	DNF	

== Swimming ==
Saint Lucia has qualified one female athlete.

Women

Athlete	Event	Heats		Final	
Athlete	Event	Time	Rank	Time	Rank
Danielle Beaubrun	100 m breaststroke	1:13.29	12th QB	1:10.63	1st B
