= Grenada at the 2023 Pan American Games =

- IOC code: GRN
- NOC: Grenada Olympic Committee

in Santiago, Chile 20 October 2023 – 5 November 2023
- Competitors: 7 in 3 sports
- Flag bearers (opening): Zackary Gresham & Tilly Collymore
- Flag bearers (closing): Denise Williams & Amanda John
- Medals: Gold 0 Silver 0 Bronze 0 Total 0

Pan American Games appearances (overview)
- 1987; 1991; 1995; 1999; 2003; 2007; 2011; 2015; 2019; 2023

Grenada is scheduled to compete at the 2023 Pan American Games in Santiago, Chile from October 20 to November 5, 2023. This was Grenada's tenth appearance at the Pan American Games, having competed at every Games since 1987.

A team of seven athletes competing in three sports represented Grenada. Swimmers Zackary Gresham and Tilly Collymore were the country's flagbearers during the opening ceremony. Meanwhile two female delegation members, Denise Williams (chef de mission) and Amanda John (press attache) were the country's flagbearers during the closing ceremony.

== Competitors ==
The following is the list of number of competitors (per gender) participating at the games per sport/discipline.

| Sport | Men | Women | Total |
|---|---|---|---|
| Athletics (track and field) | 1 | 2 | 3 |
| Boxing | 2 | 0 | 2 |
| Swimming | 1 | 1 | 2 |
| Total | 4 | 3 | 7 |

== Athletics (track and field) ==
Grenada qualified three athletes (one man and two women).

Key

- Note–Ranks given for track events are within the athlete's heat only
- Q = Qualified for the next round
- q = Qualified for the next round as a fastest loser
- Bye = Athlete not required to compete in round

Track & road events

| Athlete | Event | Semifinal | | Final | |
| Athlete | Event | Result | Rank | Result | Rank |
|---|---|---|---|---|---|
| Halle Hazzard | Women's 100 m | 11.77 | 4 | Did not advance | |

Field events

| Athlete | Event | Final | |
| Athlete | Event | Distance | Position |
|---|---|---|---|
| Kelsie Murrell-Ross | Women's shot put | 15.88 | 10 |

Combined events – Men's decathlon

| Athlete | Event | 100 m | LJ | SP | HJ | 400 m | 110H | DT | PV | JT | 1500 m | Final | Rank |
|---|---|---|---|---|---|---|---|---|---|---|---|---|---|
| Lindon Victor | Result | DNF | | | | | | | | | | DNF | DNF |
| Lindon Victor | Points | DNF | | | | | | | | | | DNF | DNF |

== Boxing ==
Grenada entered two male boxers.

Men

| Athlete | Event | Round of 32 | Round of 16 | Quarterfinal | Semifinal | Final | |
| Athlete | Event | Opposition Result | Opposition Result | Opposition Result | Opposition Result | Opposition Result | Rank |
|---|---|---|---|---|---|---|---|
| Tyshawn Jones | –63.5 kg | Bye | Falcão (BRA); L RSC R3 | Did not advance | | | |
| Nikita Borisik | –80 kg | Bye | Did not start | | | | |

== Swimming ==
Grenada qualified two swimmers (one man and one woman).

| Athlete | Event | Heat | | Final | |
| Athlete | Event | Time | Rank | Time | Rank |
|---|---|---|---|---|---|
| Zackary Gresham | 50 m freestyle | 24.89 | 32 | Did not advance | |
| Zackary Gresham | Men's 100 m backstroke | 1:00.42 | 24 | Did not advance | |
| Zackary Gresham | Men's 100 m butterfly | 56.91 | 24 | Did not advance | |
| Zackary Gresham | Men's 200 m individual medley | 2:12.50 | 23 | Did not advance | |
| Tilly Collymore | Women's 50 m freestyle | 27.34 | =26 | Did not advance | |
| Tilly Collymore | Women's 100 m freestyle | 59.87 | 33 | Did not advance | |
| Tilly Collymore | Women's 200 m freestyle | 2:10.91 | 20 | Did not advance | |

Qualification legend: Q – Qualify to the medal final; q – Qualify to the non-medal final

== See also ==
- Grenada at the 2023 Parapan American Games
- Grenada at the 2024 Summer Olympics
