= Oleksandr Loginov =

Canadian swimmer

Personal information
- Nationality: Canadian
- Born: 25 June 1992 (age 34)

Sport
- Sport: Swimming
- Strokes: Freestyle

Oleksandr Loginov (born 25 June 1992) is a Canadian swimmer. He competed in the men's 50 metre freestyle event at the 2018 FINA World Swimming Championships (25 m), in Hangzhou, China.
