= Grenada at the 2015 Pan American Games =

- IOC code: GRN
- NOC: Grenada Olympic Committee
- Website: www.olympic.org/grenada

in Toronto, Canada 10–26 July 2015
- Competitors: 7 in 3 sports
- Flag bearer (opening): Oreoluwa Cherebin
- Flag bearer (closing): Kurt Felix
- Medals Ranked =25th: Gold 0 Silver 1 Bronze 0 Total 1

Pan American Games appearances (overview)
- 1987; 1991; 1995; 1999; 2003; 2007; 2011; 2015; 2019; 2023; 2027

Grenada competed at the 2015 Pan American Games in Toronto, Ontario, Canada from July 10 to 26, 2015.

On July 2, 2015 the Grenada Olympic Committee announced a team of 7 athletes in 3 sports (athletics, swimming and tennis). Swimmer Oreoluwa Cherebin was the flagbearer for the team during the opening ceremony.

After winning zero medals at the last edition of the games in 2011, Grenada won a silver medal at this edition through Kurt Felix's silver medal in the men's decathlon. This left the country tied for 25th on the medal table.

== Competitors ==
The following table lists Grenada's delegation per sport and gender.

Sport	Men	Women	Total
Athletics	3	1	4
Swimming	1	1	2
Tennis	1	0	1
Total	5	2	7

== Medalists ==
The following competitors from Grenada won medals at the games. In the by discipline sections below, medalists' names are bolded.

Medal	Name	Sport	Event	Date
Silver	Kurt Felix	Athletics	Men's Decathlon	July 23

**Medals by sport**
**Sport**	1st place, gold medalist(s)	2nd place, silver medalist(s)	3rd place, bronze medalist(s)	**Total**
Athletics	0	1	0	1
**Total**	**0**	**1**	**0**	**1**

**Medals by day**
**Day**	1st place, gold medalist(s)	2nd place, silver medalist(s)	3rd place, bronze medalist(s)	**Total**
July 23	0	1	0	1
**Total**	**0**	**1**	**0**	**1**

**Medals by gender**
**Gender**	1st place, gold medalist(s)	2nd place, silver medalist(s)	3rd place, bronze medalist(s)	**Total**
Male	0	1	0	0
Female	0	0	0	1
**Total**	**0**	**1**	**0**	**1**

== Athletics ==
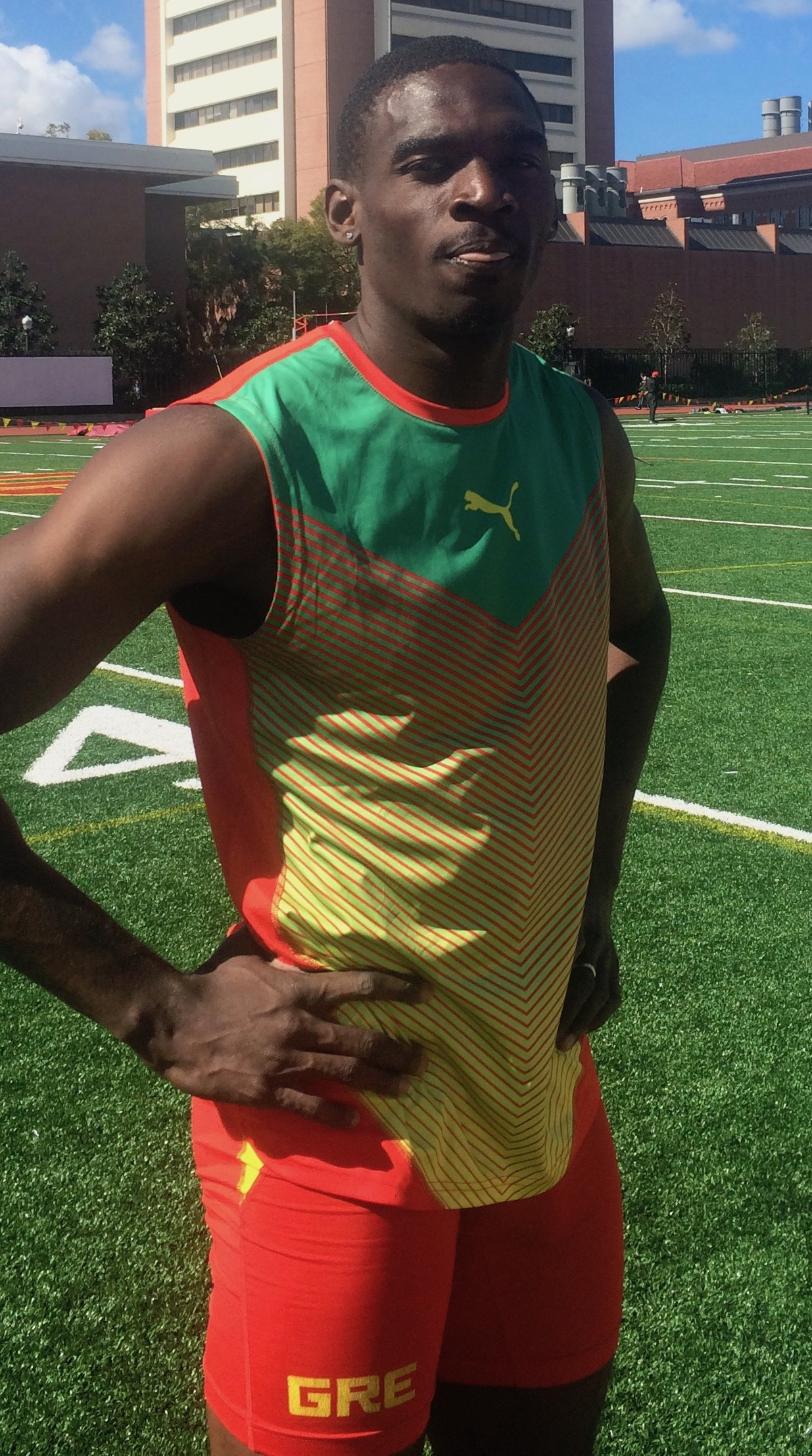
Lindon Victor took seventh place in the decathlon

Grenada qualified a team of four athletes (three men and one woman). An original team of nine athletes were entered, but the team size was reduced after the organizing committee has to reduce the entries to the quota limit of 680.

Key

- Note–Ranks given for track events are for the entire round
- **q** = Qualified for the next round as a fastest loser or, in field events, by position without achieving the qualifying target
- **PB** = Personal best

Men
Track

Athlete	Event	Semifinal		Final	
Athlete	Event	Result	Rank	Result	Rank
Bralon Taplin	400 m	47.61	15	did not advance	

Combined events – Decathlon

Athlete	Event	100 m	LJ	SP	HJ	400 m	110H	DT	PV	JT	1500 m	Final	Rank
**Kurt Felix**	Result	10.91	7.54	15.23	2.09	49.67	14.71	44.54	4.60	64.10	4:38.39	8269 **PB**	2nd place, silver medalist(s)
**Kurt Felix**	Points	881	945	804	887	830	885	757	790	800	690	8269 **PB**	2nd place, silver medalist(s)
Lindon Victor	Result	10.99	6.91	14.75	1.94	52.18	15.85	49.80	4.00	66.97	5:14.03	7453 **PB**	7
Lindon Victor	Points	863	792	774	749	717	750	866	617	843	482	7453 **PB**	7

Women
Track

Athlete	Event	Round 1		Semifinal		Final	
Athlete	Event	Result	Rank	Result	Rank	Result	Rank
Kanika Beckles	200 m	23.48 **PB**	15 **q**	28.14	16	did not advance	

== Swimming ==
Grenada received two universality spots (one male and one female).

Athlete	Event	Heat		Final	
Athlete	Event	Time	Rank	Time	Rank
Corey Ollivierre	Men's 50 m freestyle	26.61	13	did not advance	
Corey Ollivierre	Men's 100 m breaststroke	1:10.96	19	did not advance	
Corey Ollivierre	Men's 200 m breaststroke	2:41.52	22	did not advance	
Oreoluwa Cherebin	Women's 50 m freestyle	28.28	26	did not advance	
Oreoluwa Cherebin	Women's 100 m breaststroke	1:21.52	18	did not advance	
Oreoluwa Cherebin	Women's 100 m butterfly	1:10.05	21	did not advance	

== Tennis ==
Grenada received one wildcard spot in the men's singles event.

Men

Athlete	Event	First round	Round of 32	Round of 16	Quarterfinals	Semifinals	Final / BM	
Athlete	Event	Opposition Score	Opposition Score	Opposition Score	Opposition Score	Opposition Score	Opposition Score	Rank
Yannik James	Singles	Major (BAH); **W** 6-4, 4–6, 6–3	Struvay (COL); **L** 5–7, 2–6	did not advance				

== See also ==
- Grenada at the 2016 Summer Olympics
