= Jefferson Santos =

Brazilian athlete

Personal information
- Born: 30 August 1995 (age 30)
- Height: 1.79 m (5 ft 10 1/2 in)
- Weight: 76 kg (168 lb)

Sport
- Country: Brazil
- Sport: Athletics
- Event: Decathlon
- Club: G.C. Pinheiros
- Coached by: José Cordeiro

Achievements and titles
- Personal best: 8187 pts w

Jefferson de Carvalho Santos (born August 30, 1995) is a Brazilian athlete, a combined events specialist. A native of São Paulo, he won the men's decathlon competition at the 2017 South American Championships in Athletics with a personal best score of 8,187 points; due to strong winds in three of the ten events, the result is labelled wind assisted in official records.
