= Athletics at the 2019 Pan American Games – Men's javelin throw =

Men's javelin throw at the 2019 Pan American Games
- Venue: Athletics Stadium
- Dates: August 10
- Competitors: 10 from 6 nations
- Winning distance: 87.31

Medalists
Gold medal	Anderson Peters; Grenada
Silver medal	Keshorn Walcott; Trinidad and Tobago
Bronze medal	Albert Reynolds; Saint Lucia

The men's javelin throw competition of the athletics events at the 2019 Pan American Games took place on the 10 of August at the 2019 Pan American Games Athletics Stadium. The defending Pan American Games champion was Keshorn Walcott from Trinidad and Tobago.

Anderson Peters' win at the event earned him Grenada's first ever Pan American Games gold medal.

== Records ==
Prior to this competition, the existing world and Pan American Games records were as follows:

World record	Jan Železný (CZE)	98.48	Jena, Germany	May 25, 1996
Pan American Games record	Guillermo Martínez (CUB)	87.20	Guadalajara, Mexico	October 28, 2011

== Schedule ==
Date	Time	Round
August 10, 2019	15:45	Final

== Results ==
All times shown are in meters.

KEY:	q	Fastest non-qualifiers	Q	Qualified	NR	National record	PB	Personal best	SB	Seasonal best	DQ	Disqualified

=== Final ===
The results were as follows:

Rank	Name	Nationality	#1	#2	#3	#4	#5	#6	Mark	Notes
1st place, gold medalist(s)	Anderson Peters	Grenada	87.31	81.78	78.92	85.90	81.21	x	87.31	GR, NR
2nd place, silver medalist(s)	Keshorn Walcott	Trinidad and Tobago	83.55	82.92	82.92	x	x	75.54	83.55	
3rd place, bronze medalist(s)	Albert Reynolds	Saint Lucia	76.91	75.93	77.51	73.64	77.56	82.19	82.19	NR
4	Michael Shuey	United States	x	73.21	78.02	80.35	x	80.72	80.72	
5	Markim Felix	Grenada	77.18	72.47	74.77	69.26	71.18	72.30	77.18	
6	Shakeil Waithe	Trinidad and Tobago	71.80	x	76.15	x	x	–	76.15	
7	Arley Ibargüen	Colombia	72.51	74.85	74.46	70.69	x	67.97	74.85	
8	Dayron Márquez	Colombia	73.15	73.99	71.88	73.17	71.58	72.71	73.99	
9	Francisco Muse	Chile	69.33	72.84	72.84				72.84	
10	Curtis Thompson	United States	64.28	x	65.39				65.39	
