= Clemente Seguel =

Chilean sailor

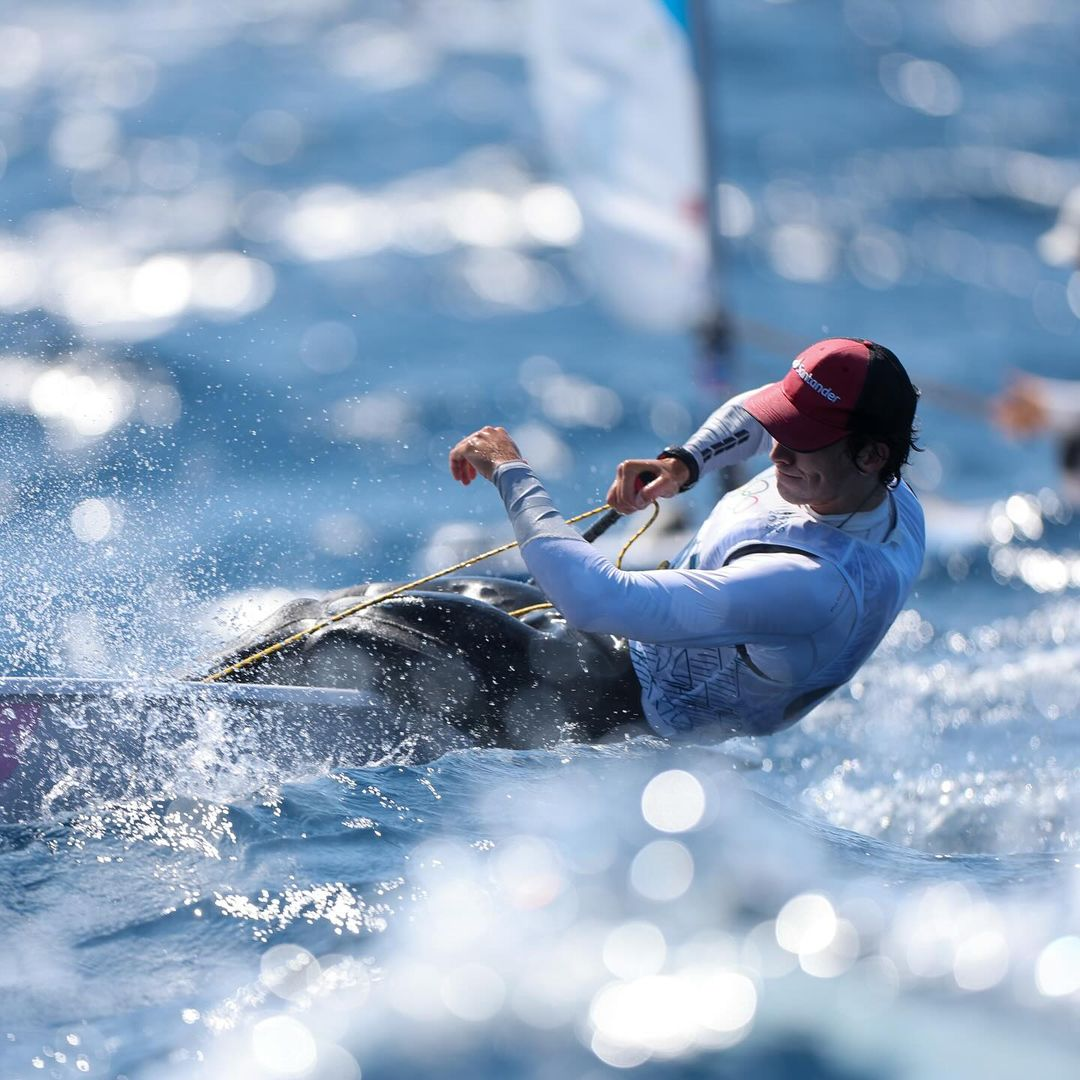
- Seguel in 2024

Personal information
- Full name: Clemente Seguel Lacámara
- Born: 23 November 1999 (age 26) Temuco, Chile

Sport
- Sport: Sailing
Medal record
Men's sailing
Representing Chile
Pan American Games
Silver medal – second place	2023 Santiago	Laser
Laser Under 21 World Championships
Silver medal – second place	2019 Split	Laser

Clemente Seguel Lacámara (Note: In this Spanish name, the first or paternal surname is Seguel and the second or maternal family name is Lacámara.) (born 23 November 1999) is a Chilean sailor. He has competed at the Summer Olympics twice, in 2020 and 2024, finishing twenty second, and eighth respectively, both times in the ILCA 7. He has also competed in two Pan American Games, winning a silver medal in 2023 in the ILCA 7.

He also competed in the Byte CII competition at the 2014 Summer Youth Olympics in Nanjing, China, where he placed 12th.
