= Jordan Augier =

Saint Lucian swimmer (born 1994)

Personal information
- Nationality: Saint Lucian
- Born: 14 November 1994 (age 31)
- Height: 1.93 m (6 ft 4 in)
- Weight: 91.17 kg (201 lb)

Sport
- Country: Saint Lucia
- Sport: Swimming

Jordan Augier (born 14 November 1994) is a Saint Lucian Olympic swimmer who also swam for the University of Tampa Spartans as a student athlete. He represented his country at the 2016 Summer Olympics in the Men's 50 metre freestyle event where he ranked at #45 with a time of 23.28 seconds. He did not advance to the semifinals.

Augier was nominated as Saint Lucia's 2013 Swimmer of the Year by one of the island country's newspapers, The St. Lucia Star.
