= Keron Toussaint =

Grenadian sprinter (born 1989)

Personal information
- Nationality: Grenadian
- Born: February 10, 1989 (age 37)

Sport
- Country: Grenada
- Sport: Track and field
- Event: Sprints

Achievements and titles
- Personal best: 400m: 46.80

Keron Toussaint (born 10 February 1989) is a Grenadian sprinter who competes in the 100 metres and 200 metres. He represented Grenada in the 2011 Pan American Games) and suffered an injury during the semi-finals of the men's 400 thus resulting with a time of 1:37.36 and a rank of 23rd. He has since attempted to be a part of the Grenadian Olympic team for the 2012 and 2016 without success.

== International competitions ==
Year	Competition	Venue	Position	Event	Notes
Representing Grenada
2011	Pan Am Games	Guadalajara, Mexico	8th (sf)	400 m	1:37.36
