= Stephanie Devaux-Lovell =

Saint Lucian sailor

Stephanie Devaux-Lovell (born September 8, 1995) is a Saint Lucian sailor. She placed 29th in the Laser Radial event at the 2016 Summer Olympics.
