= Luc Chevrier =

Saint Lucian sailor (born 1999)

Personal information
- Full name: Luc Franck Leo Chevrier
- Nationality: Saint Lucian
- Born: 30 June 1999 (age 26) La Rochelle, France

Sport

Sailing career
- Class(es): ILCA 7, Byte, ILCA 6

Luc Franck Leo Chevrier (born 30 June 1999) is a French-born Saint Lucian sailor. Born in France, he represents Saint Lucia internationally. He competed in the Laser event at the 2020 Summer Olympics.
