= Saint Lucia Olympic Committee =

National Olympic Committee

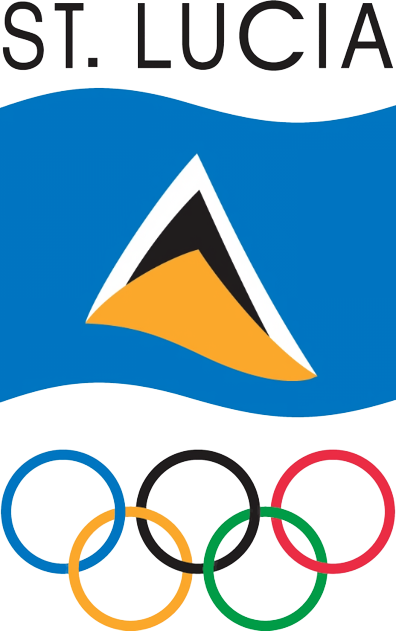
- Country/Region: Saint Lucia
- Code: LCA
- Created: 1987
- Recognized: 1993
- Continental Association: PASO
- Headquarters: Castries, Saint Lucia
- President: Alfred Emmannuel
- Secretary General: Theodore Matthews
- Website: www.slunoc.org

Saint Lucia Olympic Committee (IOC code: LCA) is the National Olympic Committee representing Saint Lucia. It is also the body responsible for Saint Lucia's representation at the Olympic Games.

== History ==
Saint Lucia Olympic Committee was founded in 1987 and recognised by the International Olympic Committee in 1993.

== See also ==
- Saint Lucia at the Olympics
- Saint Lucia at the Commonwealth Games
