= Cayman Islands at the 2027 Pan American Games =

- IOC code: CAY
- NOC: Cayman Islands Olympic Committee

in Lima, Peru 2027 – 2027
- Competitors: 1 in 1 sport
- Medals: Gold 0 Silver 0 Bronze 0 Total 0

Pan American Games appearances (overview)
- 1987; 1991; 1995; 1999; 2003; 2007; 2011; 2015; 2019; 2023

The Cayman Islands is scheduled to compete at the 2027 Pan American Games in Lima, Peru from July 23 to August 8, 2027. This will be Cayman Islands's 11th appearance at the Pan American Games, having competed at every edition of the Games since 1987.

== Competitors ==
The following is the list of number of competitors (per gender) participating at the games per sport/discipline.

| Sport | Men | Women | Total |
|---|---|---|---|
| Sailing | 0 | 1 | 1 |
| Total | 0 | 1 | 1 |

== Sailing ==
The Cayman Islands qualified 1 boat for a total of 1 sailor at the 2026 Cork Olympic Classes Regatta.

| Athlete | Event | Opening series | | | | | | | | | | | | | | | | | | Finals | | | | |
| Athlete | Event | 1 | 2 | 3 | 4 | 5 | 6 | 7 | 8 | 9 | 10 | 11 | 12 | 13 | 14 | 15 | 16 | Points | Rank | QF | SF | M / F | Points | Rank |
|---|---|---|---|---|---|---|---|---|---|---|---|---|---|---|---|---|---|---|---|---|---|---|---|---|
| | ILCA 6 | | | | | | | | | | | —N/a | | | | | | | | —N/a | | | | |
