= Swimming at the 2011 Pan American Games – Men's 100 metre butterfly =

Men's 100 metre butterfly at the 2011 Pan American Games
- Venue: Scotiabank Aquatics Center
- Dates: October 20 (preliminaries and finals)
- Competitors: 17 from 11 nations

Medalists
Gold medal	Albert Subirats	Venezuela
Silver medal	Eugene Godsoe	United States
Bronze medal	Christopher Brady	United States

The men's 100 metre butterfly competition of the swimming events at the 2011 Pan American Games took place on 20 October at the Scotiabank Aquatics Center. The defending Pan American Games champion was Kaio de Almeida of Brazil.

This race consisted of two lengths of the pool, all in butterfly.

== Records ==
Prior to this competition, the existing world and Pan American Games records were as follows:

World record	Michael Phelps (USA)	49.82	Rome, Italy	August 1, 2009
Pan American Games record	Kaio de Almeida (BRA)	52.05	Rio de Janeiro, Brazil	July 18, 2007

== Qualification ==
Each National Olympic Committee (NOC) was able to enter up to two entrants providing they had met the A standard (54.6) in the qualifying period (January 1, 2010 to September 4, 2011). NOCs were also permitted to enter one athlete providing they had met the B standard (56.2) in the same qualifying period.

== Results ==
All times are in minutes and seconds.

KEY:	q	Fastest non-qualifiers	Q	Qualified	GR	Games record	NR	National record	PB	Personal best	SB	Seasonal best

=== Heats ===
The first round was held on October 20.

Rank	Heat	Lane	Name	Nationality	Time	Notes
1	2	5	Gabriel Mangabeira	Brazil	52.95	QA
2	3	5	Christopher Brady	United States	53.67	QA
3	3	3	Omar Pinzón	Colombia	53.76	QA
4	1	3	Shaune Fraser	Cayman Islands	53.83	QA
5	3	4	Albert Subirats	Venezuela	53.84	QA
6	2	3	Benjamin Hockin	Paraguay	53.87	QA
7	2	4	Kaio de Almeida	Brazil	53.88	QA
8	1	4	Eugene Godsoe	United States	54.21	QA
9	1	5	Octavio Alesi	Venezuela	54.51	QB
10	3	2	Mauricio Fiol	Peru	54.56	QB
11	1	2	Israel Duran	Mexico	55.18	QB
12	2	2	Pablo Marmolejo	Mexico	55.27	QB
13	3	7	Alex Hernandez	Cuba	55.28	QB
14	3	6	Marcos Barale	Argentina	55.31	QB
15	1	6	Jose Lobo	Paraguay	57.18	QB
	2	6	Brett Fraser	Cayman Islands		DNS
	2	7	Niall Roberts	Guyana		DNS

=== B Final ===
The B final was also held on October 20.

Rank	Lane	Name	Nationality	Time	Notes
9	4	Octavio Alesi	Venezuela	54.15	
10	5	Mauricio Fiol	Peru	54.26	
11	7	Marcos Barale	Argentina	54.77	
12	3	Israel Duran	Mexico	54.94	
13	6	Pablo Marmolejo	Mexico	55.00	
14	2	Alex Hernandez	Cuba	55.63	
15	1	Jose Lobo	Paraguay	56.10	

=== A Final ===
The A final was held on October 20.

Rank	Lane	Name	Nationality	Time	Notes
1st place, gold medalist(s)	2	Albert Subirats	Venezuela	52.37	
2nd place, silver medalist(s)	8	Eugene Godsoe	United States	52.67	
3rd place, bronze medalist(s)	5	Christopher Brady	United States	52.95	
4	6	Shaune Fraser	Cayman Islands	52.96	
5	3	Omar Pinzón	Colombia	53.17	
6	4	Gabriel Mangabeira	Brazil	53.24	
7	7	Benjamin Hockin	Paraguay	53.43	
8	1	Kaio de Almeida	Brazil	53.62	
