= Swimming at the 2011 Pan American Games – Men's 50 metre freestyle =

Men's 50 metre freestyle at the 2011 Pan American Games
- Venue: Scotiabank Aquatics Center
- Dates: October 20 (preliminaries and finals)
- Competitors: 20 from 16 nations

Medalists
Gold medal	César Cielo	Brazil
Silver medal	Bruno Fratus	Brazil
Bronze medal	Hanser García	Cuba

The men's 50 metre freestyle competition of the swimming events at the 2011 Pan American Games took place on October 20 at the Scotiabank Aquatics Center in the municipality of Zapopan, near Guadalajara, Mexico. The defending Pan American Games champion was César Cielo Filho of Brazil.

This race consisted of one length of the pool in freestyle.

== Records ==
Prior to this competition, the existing world and Pan American Games records were as follows:

World record	César Cielo Filho (BRA)	20.91	São Paulo, Brazil	December 18, 2009
Pan American Games record	César Cielo Filho (BRA)	21.84	Rio de Janeiro, Brazil	July 22, 2007

== Qualification ==
Each National Olympic Committee (NOC) was able to enter up to two entrants providing they had met the A standard (23.1) in the qualifying period (January 1, 2010 to September 4, 2011). NOCs were also permitted to enter one athlete providing they had met the B standard (23.8) in the same qualifying period.

== Results ==
All times are in minutes and seconds.

KEY:	q	Fastest non-qualifiers	Q	Qualified	GR	Games record	NR	National record	PB	Personal best	SB	Seasonal best

=== Heats ===
The first round was held on October 20.

Rank	Heat	Lane	Name	Nationality	Time	Notes
1	3	4	César Cielo	Brazil	22.17	QA
2	2	5	Hanser García	Cuba	22.37	QA
3	2	4	Bruno Fratus	Brazil	22.44	QA
4	1	5	Brett Fraser	Cayman Islands	22.73	QA
5	1	4	William Copeland	United States	22.75	QA
6	3	5	Bryan Lundquist	United States	22.77	QA
7	3	6	Federico Grabich	Argentina	22.87	QA
8	3	3	Roy-Allan Burch	Bermuda	22.96	QA
8	1	6	Gabriel Melconian	Uruguay	22.96	QB
10	1	3	Lucas del Piccolo	Argentina	23.02	QB
11	2	6	Roberto Gomez	Venezuela	23.11	QB
12	2	3	Elvis Burrows	Bahamas	23.36	QB
13	1	7	Alejandro Escudero	Mexico	23.48	QB
14	2	2	Perry Lindo	Netherlands Antilles	23.60	QB
15	3	2	Rory Biskupski	Canada	23.64	QB
16	1	2	Martyn Forde	Barbados	23.71	QB
17	2	7	Antonio Cisneros	Mexico	23.72	
18	3	7	Oliver Elliot	Chile	23.74	
19	3	1	Tolga Akcayli	Saint Vincent and the Grenadines	25.65	
	2	1	Niall Roberts	Guyana		DNS

=== Swim-off ===
A swim-off was contested between Roy-Allan Burch and Gabriel Melconián to determine who would advance as the eighth seed to the A Final.

Rank	Lane	Name	Nationality	Time	Notes
1	5	Roy-Allan Burch	Bermuda	22.76	QA
2	4	Gabriel Melconian	Uruguay	23.07	QB

=== B Final ===
The B final was also held on October 20.

Rank	Lane	Name	Nationality	Time	Notes
9	6	Elvis Burrows	Bahamas	23.05	
10	5	Lucas del Piccolo	Argentina	23.07	
11	4	Gabriel Melconian	Uruguay	23.10	
12	3	Roberto Gomez	Venezuela	23.12	
13	1	Rory Biskupski	Canada	23.58	
14	2	Alejandro Escudero	Mexico	23.61	
15	7	Perry Lindo	Netherlands Antilles	23.65	
16	8	Martyn Forde	Barbados	23.67	

=== A Final ===
The A final was also held on October 20.

Rank	Lane	Name	Nationality	Time	Notes
1st place, gold medalist(s)	4	César Cielo	Brazil	21.58	PR
2nd place, silver medalist(s)	3	Bruno Fratus	Brazil	22.05	
3rd place, bronze medalist(s)	5	Hanser García	Cuba	22.15	
4	2	William Copeland	United States	22.30	
5	6	Brett Fraser	Cayman Islands	22.60	
6	7	Bryan Lundquist	United States	22.67	
7	8	Roy-Allan Burch	Bermuda	22.82	
8	1	Federico Grabich	Argentina	22.97	
