= Swimming at the 2015 Pan American Games – Men's 100 metre freestyle =

Men's 100 metre freestyle at the 2015 Pan American Games
- Venue: CIBC Pan Am/Parapan Am Aquatics Centre and Field House
- Dates: July 14 (preliminaries and finals)
- Competitors: 24 from 21 nations
- Winning time: 48.26

Medalists
Gold medal	Federico Grabich	Argentina
Silver medal	Santo Condorelli	Canada
Bronze medal	Marcelo Chierighini	Brazil

The men's 100 metre freestyle competition of the swimming events at the 2015 Pan American Games took place on July 14 at the CIBC Pan Am/Parapan Am Aquatics Centre and Field House in Toronto, Canada. The defending Pan American Games champion was César Cielo Filho of Brazil.

This race consisted of two lengths of the pool, both lengths in freestyle. The top eight swimmers from the heats would qualify for the A final (where the medals would be awarded), while the next best eight swimmers would qualify for the B final.

== Records ==
Prior to this competition, the existing world and Pan American Games records were as follows:

World record	César Cielo Filho (BRA)	46.91	Rome, Italy	July 30, 2009
Pan American Games record	César Cielo Filho (BRA)	47.84	Guadalajara, Mexico	October 16, 2011

== Qualification ==
Each National Olympic Committee (NOC) was able to enter up to two entrants providing they had met the A standard (50.05) in the qualifying period (January 1, 2014 to May 1, 2015). NOCs were also permitted to enter one athlete providing they had met the B standard (53.05) in the same qualifying period. All other competing athletes were entered as universality spots.

== Schedule ==
All times are Eastern Time Zone (UTC-4).

Date	Time	Round
July 14, 2015	10:18	Heats
July 14, 2015	19:15	Final B
July 14, 2015	19:20	Final A

== Results ==
KEY:	q	Fastest non-qualifiers	Q	Qualified	GR	Games record	NR	National record	PB	Personal best	SB	Seasonal best

=== Heats ===
The first round was held on July 14.

Rank	Heat	Lane	Name	Nationality	Time	Notes
1	2	5	Federico Grabich	Argentina	48.60	QA, NR
2	1	4	Santo Condorelli	Canada	48.88	QA
3	2	4	Marcelo Chierighini	Brazil	48.92	QA
4	3	6	Cristian Quintero	Venezuela	49.07	QA
4	1	5	Yuri Kisil	Canada	49.07	QA
6	1	3	Dylan Carter	Trinidad and Tobago	49.29	QA
7	2	6	Renzo Tjon-A-Joe	Suriname	49.47	QA, NR
8	3	4	Matheus Santana	Brazil	49.52	QA
9	3	5	Brett Fraser	Cayman Islands	49.58	QB
10	3	3	Darian Townsend	United States	49.88	QB
11	2	3	Cullen Jones	United States	50.09	QB
12	1	6	Benjamin Hockin	Paraguay	50.14	QB
13	2	1	Jordan Augier	Saint Lucia	50.82	QB
14	3	2	Luis Campos	Mexico	51.29	QB
15	3	7	Jordy Groters	Aruba	51.71	QB
16	2	2	Allan Gutiérrez Castro	Honduras	52.16	QB
17	1	7	Miguel Mena	Nicaragua	52.55	
18	1	2	Timothy Wynter	Jamaica	52.59	
19	1	1	Noah Mascoll-Gomes	Antigua and Barbuda	52.90	
20	3	1	Alex Sobers	Barbados	52.92	
21	2	7	Marcelo Acosta	El Salvador	53.40	
22	3	8	Gustavo Gutierrez	Peru	55.66	
23	1	8	Omar Adams	Guyana	58.01	
24	2	8	Nikolas Sylvester	Saint Vincent and the Grenadines	58.29	

=== B Final ===
The B final was also held on July 14.

Rank	Lane	Name	Nationality	Time	Notes
9	4	Brett Fraser	Cayman Islands	49.56	
10	3	Benjamin Hockin	Paraguay	49.88	
11	5	Darian Townsend	United States	49.97	
12	6	Jordan Augier	Saint Lucia	50.83	
13	2	Luis Campos	Mexico	51.70	
14	8	Timothy Wynter	Jamaica	52.23	
15	7	Allan Gutiérrez Castro	Honduras	52.59	
15	1	Miguel Mena	Nicaragua	52.59	

=== A Final ===
The A final was also held on July 14.

Rank	Lane	Name	Nationality	Time	Notes
1st place, gold medalist(s)	4	Federico Grabich	Argentina	48.26	
2nd place, silver medalist(s)	5	Santo Condorelli	Canada	48.57	
3rd place, bronze medalist(s)	3	Marcelo Chierighini	Brazil	48.80	
4	6	Cristian Quintero	Venezuela	49.06	
5	7	Dylan Carter	Trinidad and Tobago	49.10	
6	2	Yuri Kisil	Canada	49.26	
7	8	Matheus Santana	Brazil	49.58	
8	1	Renzo Tjon-A-Joe	Suriname	49.60	
