= Swimming at the 2011 Pan American Games – Men's 200 metre freestyle =

Men's 200 metre freestyle at the 2011 Pan American Games
- Venue: Scotiabank Aquatics Center
- Dates: October 18 (preliminaries and finals)
- Competitors: 20 from 15 nations

Medalists
Gold medal	Brett Fraser	Cayman Islands
Silver medal	Shaune Fraser	Cayman Islands
Bronze medal	Benjamin Hockin	Paraguay

The men's 200 metre freestyle competition of the swimming events at the 2011 Pan American Games took place on October 18 at the Scotiabank Aquatics Center in the municipality of Zapopan, near Guadalajara, Mexico. The defending Pan American Games champion was Matthew Owen of the United States

This race consisted of four lengths of the pool, all in freestyle.

At this race, Benjamin Hockin gave Paraguay its first medal in the history of swimming at the Pan American Games.

== Records ==
Prior to this competition, the existing world and Pan American Games records were as follows:

World record	Paul Biedermann (GER)	1:42.00	Rome, Italy	July 28, 2009
Pan American Games record	Gustavo Borges (BRA)	1:48.49	Mar del Plata, Argentina	March 12, 1995

== Qualification ==
Each National Olympic Committee (NOC) was able to enter up to two entrants providing they had met the A standard (1:51.6) in the qualifying period (January 1, 2010 to September 4, 2011). NOCs were also permitted to enter one athlete providing they had met the B standard (1:54.7) in the same qualifying period.

== Results ==
All times are in minutes and seconds.

KEY:	q	Fastest non-qualifiers	Q	Qualified	GR	Games record	NR	National record	PB	Personal best	SB	Seasonal best

=== Heats ===
The first round was held on October 18.

Rank	Heat	Lane	Name	Nationality	Time	Notes
1	1	5	Matthew Patton	United States	1:50.09	QA
2	2	4	Shuane Fraser	Cayman Islands	1:50.27	QA
3	2	3	Benjamin Hockin	Paraguay	1:50.52	QA
4	2	5	Cristian Quintero	Venezuela	1:50.67	QA
5	3	4	Brett Fraser	Cayman Islands	1:50.75	QA
6	1	3	André Schultz	Brazil	1:50.96	QA
6	3	3	Daniele Tirabassi	Venezuela	1:50.96	QA
8	3	5	Douglas Robison	United States	1:51.29	QA
9	1	4	Nicolas Oliveira	Brazil	1:52.65	QB
10	1	6	Martin Kutscher	Uruguay	1:53.32	QB
11	1	7	Gerardo Bañuelos	Mexico	1:53.92	QB
12	3	7	Rual Martinez	Puerto Rico	1:54.04	QB
13	1	2	Gustavo Berretta	Mexico	1:54.10	QB
14	3	6	Mateo de Angulo	Colombia	1:54.55	QB
15	2	7	Francis Despond	Canada	1:54.70	QB
15	2	2	Mario Montoya	Costa Rica	1:54.70	QB
17	3	1	Sebastian Jahnsen	Peru	1:55.10	
18	3	2	Shawn Clarke	Barbados	1:55.77	
19	2	6	Federico Grabich	Argentina	1:55.77	
20	2	1	Kevin Avila	Guatemala	2:00.47	

=== B Final ===
The B final was also held on October 18.

Rank	Lane	Name	Nationality	Time	Notes
9	1	Mario Montoya	Costa Rica	1:53.13	
10	6	Gustavo Berretta	Mexico	1:53.16	
11	5	Gerardo Bañuelos	Mexico	1:53.26	
12	7	Francis Despond	Canada	1:53.65	
13	2	Mateo de Angulo	Colombia	1:53.72	
14	4	Martin Kutscher	Uruguay	1:53.89	
15	3	Raúl Martínez	Puerto Rico	1:54.19	
16	8	Sebastian Jahnsen	Peru	1:55.26	

=== A Final ===
The A final was also held on October 18.

Rank	Lane	Name	Nationality	Time	Notes
1st place, gold medalist(s)	2	Brett Fraser	Cayman Islands	1:47.18	GR
2nd place, silver medalist(s)	5	Shaune Fraser	Cayman Islands	1:48.29	
3rd place, bronze medalist(s)	3	Benjamin Hockin	Paraguay	1:48.48	
4	4	Matthew Patton	United States	1:48.64	
5	8	Douglas Robison	United States	1:48.71	
6	6	Cristian Quintero	Venezuela	1:49.44	
7	1	André Schultz	Brazil	1:50.04	
8	7	Daniele Tirabassi	Venezuela	1:52.31	
