= Swimming at the 2007 Pan American Games – Men's 50 metre freestyle =

The Men's 50m Freestyle event at the 2007 Pan American Games took place at the Maria Lenk Aquatic Park in Rio de Janeiro, Brazil, with the final being held on July 22.

== Medalists ==
Gold	César Cielo; Brazil
Silver	Nicholas Santos; Brazil
Bronze	George Bovell; Trinidad and Tobago

== Results ==
Rank	Swimmer	Heats		Semifinals		Final
Rank	Swimmer	Time	Rank	Time	Rank	Time
1	César Cielo (BRA)	22.88	5	22.18	1	21.84
2	Nicholas Santos (BRA)	22.20	1	22.42	2	22.18
3	George Bovell (TRI)	22.79	3	22.55	3	22.36
4	Gabriel Woodward (USA)	22.75	2	23.11	8	22.49
5	José Meolans (ARG)	23.03	7	22.71	5	22.52
5	Gary Hall, Jr. (USA)	22.85	4	22.86	6	22.52
7	Camilo Becerra (COL)	23.00	6	22.63	4	22.74
8	Octavio Alesi (VEN)	23.18	10	22.99	7	22.88
9	Albert Subirats (VEN)	23.09	8	23.14	9	
10	Paul Kutscher (URU)	23.38	12	23.22	10	
11	Joe Bartoch (CAN)	23.16	9	23.24	11	
12	Richard Hortness (CAN)	23.38	12	23.38	12	
13	Gabriel Melconian (URU)	23.36	11	23.38	12	
14	Terrence Haynes (BAR)	23.55	14	23.70	14	
15	Josh Laban (ISV)	23.68	16	23.71	15	
16	Jan Roodzant (ARU)	23.65	15	23.75	16	
17	Vereance Burrows (BAH)	23.74	17			
18	Roy-Allan Burch (BER)	23.77	18			
19	Oliver Elliot (CHI)	23.78	19			
20	Shaune Fraser (CAY)	23.93	20			
21	Matias Aguilera (ARG)	24.19	21			
22	Carlos Alberto Viveros (COL)	24.40	22			
23	Naji Ferguson (GRN)	25.19	23			
—	Rodion Davelaar (AHO)	DNS	—			
