= Cayman Islands at the 2011 Pan American Games =

- IOC code: CAY
- NOC: Cayman Islands Olympic Committee
- Website: www.caymanolympic.org.ky

in Guadalajara 14–30 October 2011
- Competitors: 12 in 4 sports
- Flag bearer: Jessica McTaggart
- Medals Ranked 15th: Gold 1 Silver 1 Bronze 1 Total 3

Pan American Games appearances (overview)
- 1987; 1991; 1995; 1999; 2003; 2007; 2011; 2015; 2019; 2023

The Cayman Islands competed at the 2011 Pan American Games in Guadalajara, Mexico, October 14–30, 2011. The Cayman Islands sent twelve athletes in four sports, the same number as from the 2007 Pan American Games in Rio de Janeiro. The Chef de Mission of the team is general secretary of the Cayman Islands Football Association, Bruce Blake.

The Cayman Islands won its first ever gold medal at the Pan American Games.

== Medalists ==
Medal	Name	Sport	Event	Date
Gold	Brett Fraser	Swimming	Men's 200 metre freestyle	October 18
Silver	Shaune Fraser	Swimming	Men's 200 metre freestyle	October 18
Bronze	Shaune Fraser	Swimming	Men's 100 metre freestyle	October 16

== Athletics ==
Cayman Islands sent an athletics team of seven athletes.

Men

Event	Athletes	Heats		Semifinal		Final	
Event	Athletes	Result	Rank	Result	Rank	Result	Rank
800 m	Jon Rankin			2:21.36	15th Q^{*}	1:52.72	7th
1500 m	Jon Rankin					3:54.79	4th
400 m hurdles	Junior Hines			52.36	5th	did not advance	
Long jump	Carl Morgan	7.54 m.	7th q			7.38 m.	10th
Carlos Morgan	Long jump	6.65 m.	11th			did not advance	
Michael Letterlough	Hammer throw					57.72 m.	12th

^{*}Jon Rankin was advanced to the final due to interference.

== Equestrian ==
For the first time ever the Cayman Islands has qualified one athlete in equestrian.

Dressage

Athlete	Horse	Event	Grand Prix		Grand Prix Special		Grand Prix Freestyle		Final Score	Rank
Athlete	Horse	Event	Score	Rank	Score	Rank	Score	Rank	Final Score	Rank
Jessica McTaggart	Ray of Light	Individual	60.921	38th	did not advance					

== Shooting ==
Cayman Islands sent a shooting team of two trap shooters.

Men

Event	Athlete	Qualification		Final	
Event	Athlete	Score	Rank	Score	Rank
Eddison McLean	Skeet	110	25th	did not advance	
Christopher Jackson	Trap	107	24th	did not advance	

== Swimming ==
Cayman Islands sent a swimming team. The team includes the only medalist for the Cayman Islands at the 2007 Pan American Games, Shaune Fraser.

Men

Athlete	Event	Heats		Final	
Athlete	Event	Time	Rank	Time	Rank
Brett Fraser	50 m Freestyle	22.73	4th QA	22.60	5th
Brett Fraser	100 m Freestyle	49.16	5th QA	49.07	5th
Brett Fraser	200 m Freestyle	1:50.75	5th QA	1:47.18 RP	1st place, gold medalist(s)
Brett Fraser	100 m Butterfly	DNS		did not advance	
Shaune Fraser	100 m Freestyle	49.00	2nd QA	48.63	3rd place, bronze medalist(s)
Shaune Fraser	200 m Freestyle	1:50.27	2nd QA	1:48.29	2nd place, silver medalist(s)
Shaune Fraser	100 m Butterfly	53.83	4th QA	52.96	4th
Shaune Fraser	200 m Butterfly	DNS		did not advance	

Women

Athlete	Event	Heats		Final	
Athlete	Event	Time	Rank	Time	Rank
Tori Flowers	800 m Freestyle	9:41.51	16th	did not advance	
Lara Butler	100 m Butterfly	1:08.34	22nd qB	1:06.97	8th B
Lara Butler	200 m Butterfly	2:35.44	12th	did not advance	
Lara Butler	200 m Individual Medley	2:34.86	21st	did not advance	
Lara Butler	400 m Individual Medley	5:35.96	23rd	did not advance	
