= Swimming at the 2012 Summer Olympics – Men's 100 metre freestyle =

Men's 100 metre freestyle at the Games of the XXX Olympiad
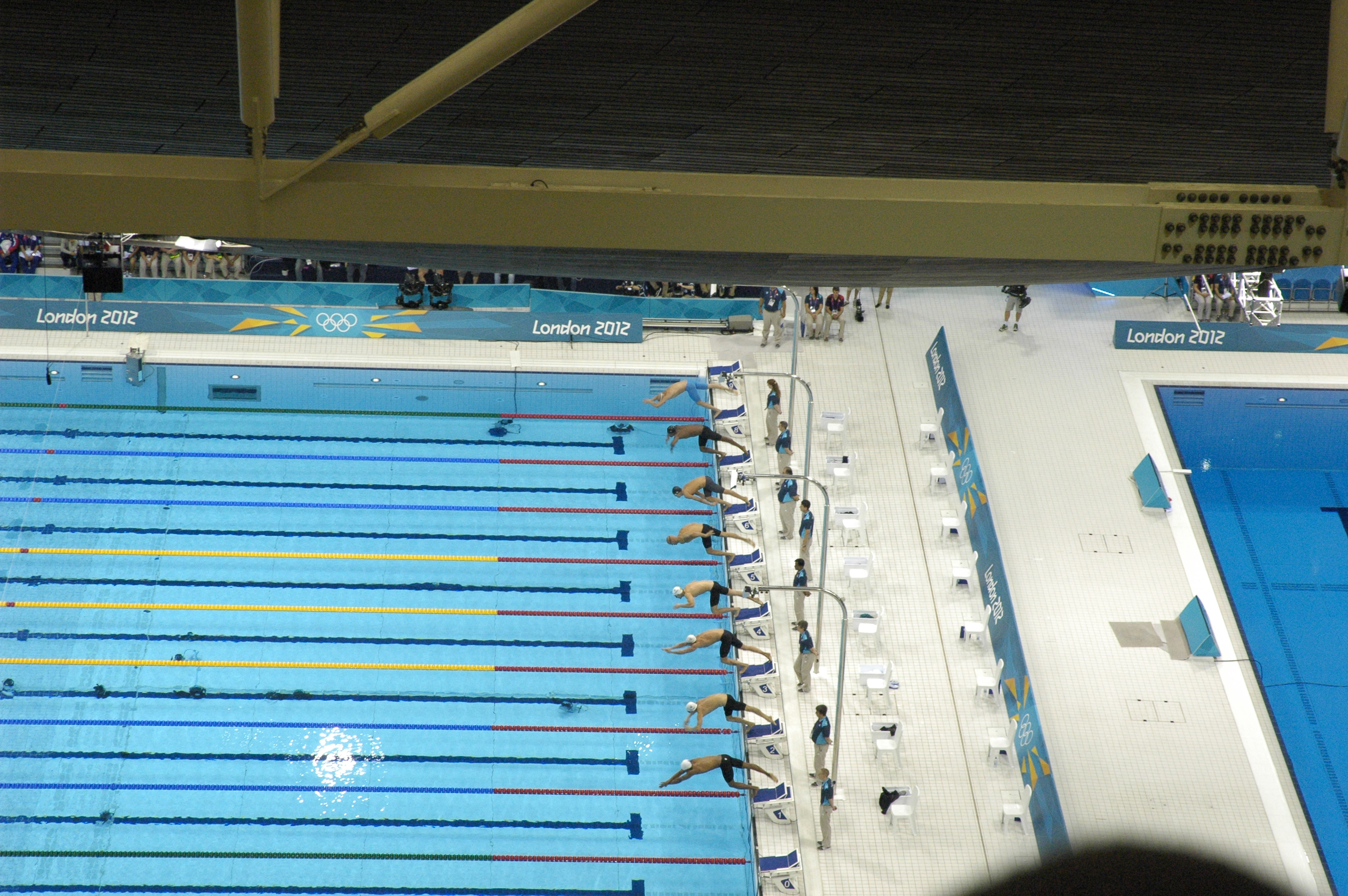
- Start of the men's 100 metre freestyle heat 8
- Venue: London Aquatics Centre
- Dates: July 31, 2012 (heats & semifinals); August 1, 2012 (final)
- Competitors: 56 from 49 nations
- Winning time: 47.52

Medalists
1st place, gold medalist(s)		Nathan Adrian; United States
2nd place, silver medalist(s)		James Magnussen; Australia
3rd place, bronze medalist(s)		Brent Hayden; Canada

The men's 100 metre freestyle event at the 2012 Summer Olympics took place on 31 July and 1 August at the London Aquatics Centre in London, United Kingdom. There were 56 competitors from 49 nations. The event was won by Nathan Adrian of the United States.

== Summary ==
In one of the closest finishes in Olympic history, Nathan Adrian touched out Australia's favorite James Magnussen at the wall by a fingertip to win the event at the Olympics for the Americans for the first time since Matt Biondi topped the podium in 1988. Coming from third at the halfway turn, Adrian powered home on the final stretch, finishing in 47.52 to edge out Magnussen, also known as "The Missile", by a hundredth of a second (0.01). Meanwhile, Magnussen won a second straight silver for the Aussies in 47.53, adding more than four tenths of a second from his best time of 47.10 at the 2012 Australian Championships. Canada's Brent Hayden picked up the bronze in 47.80, winning his first Olympic medal and handing the Canadians their first ever medal in the event's history.

After claiming two golds and a silver in the past four days, France's Yannick Agnel could not produce his similar effort with a fourth-place time in 47.84. Meanwhile, Netherlands' Sebastiaan Verschuren pulled off a fifth-place finish in 47.88. Heading into the halfway turn with an early lead, Brazil's world record holder César Cielo dropped to sixth in 47.92. Cuba's Hanser García (48.04) and Russia's Nikita Lobintsev (48.44) rounded out a historic finale.

== Background ==
This was the twenty-sixth appearance of the men's 100 metre freestyle. The event has been held at every Summer Olympics except 1900 (when the shortest freestyle was the 200 metres), though the 1904 version was measured in yards rather than metres.

Two of the eight finalists from the 2008 Games returned: bronze medalist César Cielo of Brazil and eighth-place finisher Stefan Nystrand of Sweden. The favorite coming into the event was James Magnussen of Australia, the 2011 world champion and textile-suit world best holder. Cielo had been the 2009 world champion; his world record (set in a skinsuit) still stands as of 2020. Canadian Brent Hayden was the runner-up in the 2011 world championships. French relay anchor Yannick Agnel was also a contender.

Grenada, Mali, Paraguay, Tanzania, and Turkmenistan each made their debut in the event. The United States made its 25th appearance, most of any nation, having missed only the boycotted 1980 Games.

== Qualification ==
Each National Olympic Committee (NOC) could enter up to two swimmers if both met the Olympic Qualifying Time (or "OQT"). An NOC with no swimmers meeting the OQT but at least one swimmer meeting the Olympic Selection Time (or "OST") was not guaranteed a place, but was eligible for selection to fill the overall 900 swimmer quota for the Games. For 2012, the OQT was 48.82 seconds while the OST was 50.53 seconds. The qualifying window was 1 March 2011 to 3 July 2012; only approved meets (generally international competitions and national Olympic trials) during that period could be used to meet the standards. There were also universality places available; if no male swimmer from a nation qualified in any event, the NOC could enter one male swimmer in an event.

Eight nations (Australia, Brazil, the Cayman Islands, France, Italy, Russia, South Africa, and the United States) had two swimmers meet the OQT. Five more (Canada, Cuba, Germany, the Netherlands, and Poland) had one swimmer qualify through the OQT. 18 NOCs received a place through OST selection. 21 nations used universality places in the men's 100 metre freestyle.

The two swimmers per NOC limit had been in place since the 1984 Games.

== Competition format ==
This freestyle swimming competition consisted of three rounds: heats, semifinals, and a final. The swimmers with the best 16 times in the heats advanced to the semifinals. The swimmers with the best 8 times in the semifinals advanced to the final. Swim-offs were used as necessary to break ties for advancement to the next round.

== Records ==
Prior to this competition, the existing world and Olympic records were as follows.

World record	César Cielo (BRA)	46.91	Rome, Italy	30 July 2009
Olympic record	Eamon Sullivan (AUS)	47.05	Beijing, China	13 August 2008

No new world or Olympic records were set during the competition. It was the first Olympics where non-textile suits were banned.

== Schedule ==
The competition returned to a two-day schedule, with heats and semifinals on the same day.

All times are British Summer Time (UTC+1)

Date	Time	Round
Tuesday, 31 July 2012	10:00; 19:30	Heats; Semifinals
Wednesday, 1 August 2012	20:20	Final

== Results ==
=== Heats ===
Rank	Heat	Lane	Swimmer	Nation	Time	Notes
1	6	5	Nathan Adrian	United States	48.19	Q
2	6	1	Gideon Louw	South Africa	48.29	Q
3	8	2	Sebastiaan Verschuren	Netherlands	48.37	Q
4	8	4	James Magnussen	Australia	48.38	Q
5	8	5	Brent Hayden	Canada	48.51	Q
6	6	7	Brett Fraser	Cayman Islands	48.54	Q
6	7	8	Pieter Timmers	Belgium	48.54	Q, NR
8	6	3	Nikita Lobintsev	Russia	48.60	Q
9	8	7	Cullen Jones	United States	48.61	Q
10	7	7	Konrad Czerniak	Poland	48.63	Q
11	6	4	César Cielo	Brazil	48.67	Q
12	7	4	James Roberts	Australia	48.93	Q
12	7	5	Yannick Agnel	France	48.93	Q
14	8	3	Fabien Gilot	France	48.95	Q
15	7	2	Hanser García	Cuba	48.97	Q
16	8	1	Shaune Fraser	Cayman Islands	48.99	Q
17	5	4	Norbert Trandafir	Romania	49.02	
18	7	6	Marco di Carli	Germany	49.03	
19	6	2	Filippo Magnini	Italy	49.18	
20	6	8	Adam Brown	Great Britain	49.20	
21	7	3	Graeme Moore	South Africa	49.29	
22	8	6	Luca Dotto	Italy	49.43	
23	5	2	Martin Verner	Czech Republic	49.49	
24	7	1	Nicolas Oliveira	Brazil	49.51	
25	8	8	Stefan Nystrand	Sweden	49.55	
26	5	6	David Dunford	Kenya	49.60	
27	4	5	Kemal Arda Gürdal	Turkey	49.71	
28	5	7	Mindaugas Sadauskas	Lithuania	49.78	
29	5	8	Dominik Meichtry	Switzerland	49.95	
30	4	7	Uvis Kalniņš	Latvia	49.96	
31	5	1	Kristian Golomeev	Greece	50.08	
32	4	6	Benjamin Hockin	Paraguay	50.12	
33	4	3	Nabil Kebbab	Algeria	50.37	
34	4	4	Yauhen Tsurkin	Belarus	50.53	
35	4	1	Gabriel Melconian Alvez	Uruguay	50.68	
36	4	8	Branden Whitehurst	Virgin Islands	51.04	
37	3	4	Sidni Hoxha	Albania	51.11	NR
38	3	2	Kevin Avila Soto	Guatemala	51.44	
39	3	5	Andrew Chetcuti	Malta	51.67	NR
40	3	3	Jemal le Grand	Aruba	51.86	
41	3	7	Andrew Rutherfurd	Bolivia	52.57	
42	3	6	Mohammed Bidarian	Iran	52.93	
43	2	4	Esau Simpson	Grenada	53.26	
44	3	8	Christopher Duenas	Guam	53.37	
45	3	1	Mikael Koloyan	Armenia	53.82	
46	2	2	Sergeý Krowýakow	Turkmenistan	54.43	NR
47	2	3	Paul Elaisa	Fiji	54.87	
48	2	5	Niall Roberts	Guyana	55.66	
49	2	1	Tamir Andryei	Mongolia	56.37	
50	2	6	Shane Mangroo	Seychelles	56.46	
51	2	7	Omar Núñez	Nicaragua	57.11	
52	1	4	Mamadou Soumare	Mali	57.32	
53	1	5	Ahmed Husam	Maldives	57.53	
54	2	8	Israr Hussain	Pakistan	57.86	
55	1	6	Ammaar Ghadiyali	Tanzania	1:01.07	
56	1	3	Beni Bertrand Binobagira	Burundi	1:04.57	
—	4	2	George Bovell	Trinidad and Tobago	DNS	
—	5	3	Lü Zhiwu	China	DNS	
—	5	5	Dominik Kozma	Hungary	DNS	
—	6	6	Danila Izotov	Russia	DNS	

=== Semifinals ===
Rank	Heat	Lane	Swimmer	Nation	Time	Notes
1	1	5	James Magnussen	Australia	47.63	Q
2	2	4	Nathan Adrian	United States	47.97	Q
3	2	8	Hanser García	Cuba	48.04	Q, NR
4	2	5	Sebastiaan Verschuren	Netherlands	48.13	Q
5	1	2	César Cielo	Brazil	48.17	Q
6	2	3	Brent Hayden	Canada	48.21	Q
7	2	1	Yannick Agnel	France	48.23	Q
8	1	6	Nikita Lobintsev	Russia	48.38	Q
9	2	7	Konrad Czerniak	Poland	48.44	
9	1	4	Gideon Louw	South Africa	48.44	
11	1	1	Fabien Gilot	France	48.49	
12	1	7	James Roberts	Australia	48.57	
12	2	6	Pieter Timmers	Belgium	48.57	
14	2	2	Cullen Jones	United States	48.60	
15	1	3	Brett Fraser	Cayman Islands	48.92	
16	1	8	Shaune Fraser	Cayman Islands	49.07	

=== Final ===
Rank	Lane	Swimmer	Nation	Time	Notes
1st place, gold medalist(s)	5	Nathan Adrian	United States	47.52	
2nd place, silver medalist(s)	4	James Magnussen	Australia	47.53	
3rd place, bronze medalist(s)	7	Brent Hayden	Canada	47.80	
4	1	Yannick Agnel	France	47.84	
5	6	Sebastiaan Verschuren	Netherlands	47.88	
6	2	César Cielo	Brazil	47.92	
7	3	Hanser García	Cuba	48.04	=NR
8	8	Nikita Lobintsev	Russia	48.44	
