= Hanser García =

Cuban swimmer

Personal information
- Full name: Hanser García Hernández
- Nicknames: "El Pollo", (The Chicken)
- Nationality: Cuba
- Born: 10 October 1988 (age 37) Caibarién, Cuba
- Height: 1.92 m (6 ft 4 in)
- Weight: 80 kg (176 lb; 12 st 8 lb)

Sport
- Sport: Swimming
- Strokes: Freestyle,
- Club: Escuela de Natacion Marcelo Salado
Medal record
Men's swimming, water polo
Representing Cuba
Pan American Games
Silver medal – second place	2011 Guadalajara	100 m freestyle
Bronze medal – third place	2011 Guadalajara	50 m freestyle

Hanser García Hernández (born 10 October 1988 in Caibarién, Cuba) is a Cuban whose original sport was water polo but later on became a swimmer and freestyle specialist. He competed in the 50 m event and the 100 m event at the 2012 Summer Olympics and placed 23rd and 7th respectively. At the 2011 Pan American Games, García won the silver medal in the 100m freestyle and the bronze in the 50m freestyle.
