= Cayman Islands at the 2015 Pan American Games =

- IOC code: CAY
- NOC: Cayman Islands Olympic Committee
- Website: www.caymanolympic.org.ky

in Toronto, Canada 10–26 July 2015
- Competitors: 7 in 4 sports
- Flag bearer (opening): Brett Fraser
- Flag bearer (closing): Kemar Hyman
- Medals: Gold 0 Silver 0 Bronze 0 Total 0

Pan American Games appearances (overview)
- 1987; 1991; 1995; 1999; 2003; 2007; 2011; 2015; 2019; 2023; 2027

The Cayman Islands competed at the 2015 Pan American Games in Toronto, Ontario, Canada from July 10 to 26, 2015. For the first time ever the country had a national house at a multi-sport event. The offices of FUSE Marketing Group, in Downtown Toronto served as the location of the house.

Swimmer Brett Fraser was the flagbearer for the team during the opening ceremony.

== Competitors ==
The following table lists Cayman Island's delegation per sport and gender.

Sport	Men	Women	Total
Athletics	2	0	2
Beach volleyball	0	2	2
Gymnastics	0	1	1
Swimming	1	1	2
Total	3	4	7

== Athletics ==
The Cayman Islands qualified two athletes. Originally the country had qualified more athletes including a 4×100 metres relay team. However organizers had to reduce the quota in athletics as too many athletes had qualified.

Key

- Note–Ranks given for track events are for the entire round
- Q = Qualified for the next round

Men
Track

Athlete	Event	Heat		Semi-final		Final	
Athlete	Event	Time	Rank	Time	Rank	Time	Rank
Kemar Hyman	100 m	10.14	=9 Q	10.17	=9	did not advance	
Ronald Forbes	110 m hurdles	—N/a		13.78	15	did not advance	

== Beach volleyball ==
The Cayman Islands qualified a women's pair.

Athlete	Event	Preliminary Round			13th to 16th Round	15th to 16th Round	Final
Athlete	Event	Opposition Score	Opposition Score	Opposition Score	Opposition Score	Opposition Score	Rank
Ileann Powery; Chante Smith-Johnson	Women's	Humana-Paredes / Pischke (CAN); L (8–21, 10–21)	Gómez / Nieto (URU); L (7–21, 7–21)	Bernier Colon / Torruella (PUR); L (5–21, 11–21)	Davidson / Dyette (TRI); L (18–21, 18–21)	Machado / Rodríguez (NIC); L (7–21, 16–21)	16

== Gymnastics ==
The Cayman Islands qualified one female gymnast. This will be the first time ever the country has competed in the sport at the Pan American Games.

Artistic
Women

Athlete	Event	Qualification						Final					
Athlete	Event	Apparatus				Total	Rank	Apparatus				Total	Rank
Athlete	Event	F	V	UB	BB	Total	Rank	F	V	UB	BB	Total	Rank
Morgan Lloyd	All-Around	11.750	7.450	10.750	10.100	40.050	30 R	11.550	8.750	10.550	10.300	41.150	23

Qualification Legend: R = Qualified to apparatus final since two athletes per country can qualify for finals and United States and Brazil had reached the maximum number of athletes qualified into the finals.

== Swimming ==
The Cayman Islands qualified two swimmers (one male and one female).

Key

- Note – Ranks given for swimming events are for all heats
- FB = Qualified for the B Final
- NR = National record

Athlete	Event	Heat		Final	
Athlete	Event	Time	Rank	Time	Rank
Brett Fraser	Men's 50 m freestyle	22.71	11 FB	22.93	13
Brett Fraser	Men's 100 m freestyle	49.58	9 FB	49.56	9
Lara Butler	Women's 200 m backstroke	2:26.43	17	did not advance	
Lara Butler	Women's 200 m butterfly	2:22.81	15 FB	2:21.52	15
Lara Butler	Women's 200 m individual medley	2:26.50	14 FB	2:24.64 NR	13

== See also ==
- Cayman Islands at the 2016 Summer Olympics
