= Gymnastics at the 2015 Pan American Games – Qualification =

== Qualification ==
A total of 176 gymnasts are allowed to compete (114 in artistic, 46 in rhythmic and 16 in trampoline). A nation may enter a maximum of 22 athletes across all disciplines (five in each gender for artistic, six athletes in rhythmic group, two in individual and two in each trampoline event).

== Qualification timeline ==
Event	Date	Venue
2014 Pan American Gymnastics Championships	August 19 – September 1, 2014	(Canada) Mississauga

== Qualification summary ==
*In Artistic Gymnastics, NOCs with 5 entered gymnasts may also enter the team competition.

Nation	Artistic		Rhythmic		Trampoline		Total
Nation	Men	Women	Individual	Group	Men	Women	Total
Argentina	3	5	2		1	1	12
Bahamas		1					1
Bermuda		1					1
Bolivia	1	1					2
Brazil	5	5	2	6	1	1	20
Canada	5	5	2	6	2	2	22
Cayman Islands		1					1
Chile	5	3	1				9
Colombia	5	5	1		1		12
Costa Rica	1						1
Cuba	5	5	1	6			17
Dominican Republic	1	1					2
Ecuador	1	1	1				3
El Salvador	1						1
Guatemala	1	1					2
Honduras		1					1
Mexico	5	5	2	6	1	1	20
Panama	1	1					2
Peru	2	2					4
Puerto Rico	5	2					7
Trinidad and Tobago	1	1					2
United States	5	5	2	6	2	2	22
Uruguay	1						1
Venezuela	3	5	2			1	11
Total: 24 NOCs	57	57	16	30	8	8	176

== Artistic ==
The top eight teams in each event qualified five gymnasts each. Teams 9-13 each qualified two gymnasts each. A further seven spots were available (per gender) for individual qualification (with a maximum of one quota per gender per nation). However, only 12 nations entered the men's team event. This meant that the two additional quotas were allocated to the individual qualification (bringing the total to nine available spots). However, only eight nations had entered the individual event and thus the ninth-place finishing team received an additional quota (three total). In the women's event only eleven nations entered the team event which mean an additional four quotas were available in the individual event. However, only ten nations were entered in that event, meaning the ninth place team also got three spots.

=== Men ===
Event	Criterion	Qualified	Gymnasts per NOC	Total
2014 Pan American Championship	Teams places 1–8	United States; Colombia; Brazil; Puerto Rico; Canada; Cuba; Chile; Mexico	5	40
2014 Pan American Championship	Team placed 9-10	Argentina; Venezuela	3	6
2014 Pan American Championship	Teams places 10–12	Peru	2	2
2014 Pan American Championship	Individual all around top 9 countries not already qualified	Costa Rica; Ecuador; Dominican Republic; Guatemala; Uruguay; El Salvador; Bolivia; Trinidad and Tobago; Panama	1	9
TOTAL				57

- Costa Rica qualified two men, but declined one spot, which was awarded to Venezuela.

=== Women ===
Event	Criterion	Qualified	Gymnasts per NOC	Total
2014 Pan American Championship	Teams places 1–8	United States; Brazil; Mexico; Cuba; Canada; Colombia; Venezuela; Argentina	5	40
2014 Pan American Championship	Team placed 9th	Chile	3	3
2014 Pan American Championship	Teams places 10–11	Puerto Rico; Peru	2	4
2014 Pan American Championship	Individual all around top 10 countries not already qualified	Guatemala; Panama; Trinidad and Tobago; Honduras; Bolivia; Dominican Republic; Ecuador; Bermuda; Cayman Islands; Bahamas	1	10
TOTAL				57

== Rhythmic ==
The top six nations in the individual event at the Pan American Championship qualified two gymnasts. The last four spots went to the top four nations in the individual event, that have not earned any quotas. The top five nations in the group event also qualified.

=== Individual ===
Event	Gymnasts per NOC	Qualified
2014 Pan American Championship individual event	2	United States; Brazil; Canada; Mexico; Argentina; Venezuela
2014 Pan American Championship individual event	1	Colombia; Ecuador; Chile; Cuba
TOTAL	16	

=== Group ===
Event	Criterion	Qualified
2014 Pan American Championship group event	Top 5	Brazil; United States; Mexico; Cuba; Canada
TOTAL	5	

== Trampoline ==
The top two teams in the team event at the Pan American Championship qualified two gymnasts in each respective event. The last four spots in each event went to the top two nations in the individual event, that have not earned any quotas.

Event	Gymnasts per NOC	Qualified Men	Qualified Women
2014 Pan American Championship team event	2	Canada; United States	Canada; United States
2014 Pan American Championship individual event	1	Mexico; Colombia; Argentina; Brazil	Mexico; Brazil; Venezuela; Argentina
TOTAL		8	8
