= Cayman Islands at the 2003 Pan American Games =

- IOC code: CAY
- NOC: Cayman Islands Olympic Committee
- Website: www.caymanolympic.org.ky

in Santo Domingo 1–17 August 2003
- Flag bearer: Olney Thompson
- Medals Ranked 24th: Gold 0 Silver 1 Bronze 0 Total 1

Pan American Games appearances (overview)
- 1987; 1991; 1995; 1999; 2003; 2007; 2011; 2015; 2019; 2023; 2027

The 14th Pan American Games were held in Santo Domingo, Dominican Republic from August 1 to August 17, 2003.

== Medals ==
=== Silver ===
===== Athletics =====
- Women's 200 metres: Cydonie Mothersille

== Results by event ==
=== Swimming ===
==== Women's Competition ====
| Athlete | Event | Heat | | Final | |
| Athlete | Event | Time | Rank | Time | Rank |
|---|---|---|---|---|---|
| Kaitlyn Elphinstone | 200 m freestyle | 2:10.23 | 15 | 2:08.90 | 14 |
| Kaitlyn Elphinstone | 400 m freestyle | 4:30.25 | 12 | 4:28.73 | 12 |
| Heather Roffey | 400 m freestyle | 4:31.35 | 13 | 4:29.57 | 13 |
| Kaitlyn Elphinstone | 800 m freestyle | — | | 9:25.06 | 10 |

== See also ==
- Cayman Islands at the 2002 Commonwealth Games
- Cayman Islands at the 2004 Summer Olympics
