= Cayman Islands at the 2019 Pan American Games =

- IOC code: CAY
- NOC: Cayman Islands Olympic Committee

in Lima, Peru 26 July–11 August 2019
- Competitors: 6 in 4 sports
- Flag bearer: Kemar Hyman (opening)
- Medals: Gold 0 Silver 0 Bronze 0 Total 0

Pan American Games appearances (overview)
- 1987; 1991; 1995; 1999; 2003; 2007; 2011; 2015; 2019; 2023

The Cayman Islands competed at the 2019 Pan American Games in Lima, Peru from July 26 to August 11, 2019.

The Cayman Islands Olympic Committee officially named the team of six athletes (four men and two women) competing in four sports (athletics, gymnastics, sailing and swimming) on June 28, 2019. The team also consisted of eight officials, coaches and managers.

During the opening ceremony of the games, sprinter Kemar Hyman carried the flag of the country as part of the parade of nations.

== Competitors ==
The following is the list of number of competitors (per gender) participating at the games per sport/discipline.

Sport	Men	Women	Total
Athletics (track and field)	1	0	1
Gymnastics	0	1	1
Sailing	1	0	1
Swimming	2	1	3
Total	4	2	6

== Athletics (track and field) ==
Cayman Islands qualified one male track athlete.

Key

- Note–Ranks given for track events are for the entire round

Men
Track event

Athlete	Event	Semifinal		Final	
Athlete	Event	Result	Rank	Result	Rank
Kemar Hyman	100 m	10.44	13	Did not advance	

== Gymnastics ==
The Cayman Islands qualified one female artistic gymnast.

=== Artistic ===
Women
Individual Qualification

Athlete	Event	Apparatus				Total	Rank
Athlete	Event	V	UB	BB	F	Total	Rank
Raegan Rutty	Individual all-around	12.075	9.600	9.400	9.900	40.975	38

== Sailing ==
The Cayman Islands received a universality spot in the men's laser event.

Men

Athlete	Event	Race											Net points	Final rank
Athlete	Event	1	2	3	4	5	6	7	8	9	10	M	Net points	Final rank
Jesse Jackson	Laser	21	20	18	22	22	22	22	21	19	21	Did not qualify	186	21

== Swimming ==
Cayman Islands qualified three swimmers (two men and one woman).

Athlete	Event	Heat		Final	
Athlete	Event	Time	Rank	Time	Rank
John Bodden	Men's 400 m freestyle	4:04.34	15 FB	4:10.70	16
John Bodden	Men's 1500 m freestyle	—N/a		16:16.31	16
John Bodden	Men's 200 m butterfly	2:08.22	21	did not advance	
Brett Fraser	Men's 50 m freestyle	22.74	9 FB	23.42	16
Brett Fraser	Men's 100 m freestyle	49.68	7 FA	49.97	8
Lauren Hew	Women's 50 m freestyle	27.13	21	did not advance	
Lauren Hew	Women's 100 m freestyle	1:01.38	25	did not advance	
Lauren Hew	Women's 200 m freestyle	2:14.50	21	did not advance	

== See also ==
- Cayman Islands at the 2020 Summer Olympics
