= Cayman Islands at the Pan American Games =

- IOC code: CAY
- NOC: Cayman Islands Olympic Committee
- Website: www.caymanolympic.org.ky
- Medals Ranked 27th: Gold 1 Silver 4 Bronze 1 Total 6

Pan American Games appearances (overview)
- 1987; 1991; 1995; 1999; 2003; 2007; 2011; 2015; 2019; 2023

The Cayman Islands has competed at every edition of the Pan American Games since the ninth edition of the multi-sport event in 1987. The Cayman Islands did not compete at the first and only Pan American Winter Games in 1990.

== Medal count ==
To sort the tables by host city, total medal count, or any other column, click on the icon next to the column title.

=== Summer ===
Year	Ref.	Edition	Host city	Rank	Gold	Silver	Bronze	Total
1951		I	(Argentina) Buenos Aires	Did not participate				
1955		II	Mexico City	Did not participate				
1959		III	(United States) Chicago	Did not participate				
1963		IV	(Brazil) São Paulo	Did not participate				
1967		V	(Canada) Winnipeg	Did not participate				
1971		VI	(Colombia) Cali	Did not participate				
1975		VII	Mexico City	Did not participate				
1979		VIII	(Puerto Rico) San Juan	—	0	0	0	0
1983		IX	(Venezuela) Caracas	—	0	0	0	0
1987		X	(United States) Indianapolis	—	0	0	0	0
1991		XI	(Cuba) Havana	—	0	0	0	0
1995		XII	(Argentina) Mar del Plata	—	0	0	0	0
1999		XIII	(Canada) Winnipeg	23rd	0	1	0	1
2003		XIV	(Dominican Republic) Santo Domingo	23rd	0	1	0	1
2007		XV	(Brazil) Rio de Janeiro	23rd	0	1	0	1
2011		XVI	(Mexico) Guadalajara	15th	1	1	1	3
2015		XVII	(Canada) Toronto	—	0	0	0	0
2019		XVIII	(Peru) Lima	—	0	0	0	0
2023		XIX	(Chile) Santiago	—	0	0	0	0
Total				27th	1	4	1	6

=== Winter ===
Year	Ref.	Edition	Host city	Rank	Gold	Silver	Bronze	Total
1990		I	(Argentina) Las Leñas	Did not participate				
Total				—	0	0	0	0
