= Swimming at the 2011 Pan American Games – Men's 100 metre freestyle =

Men's 100 metre freestyle at the 2011 Pan American Games
- Venue: Scotiabank Aquatics Center
- Dates: October 16 (preliminaries and finals)

Medalists
Gold medal	César Cielo	Brazil
Silver medal	Hanser García	Cuba
Bronze medal	Shaune Fraser	Cayman Islands

The men's 100 metre freestyle competition of the swimming events at the 2011 Pan American Games took place on October 16 at the Scotiabank Aquatics Center in the municipality of Zapopan, near Guadalajara, Mexico. The defending Pan American Games champion was César Cielo Filho of the Brazil.

This race consisted of two lengths of the pool, both lengths in freestyle.

== Records ==
Prior to this competition, the existing world and Pan American Games records were as follows:

World record	César Cielo Filho (BRA)	46.91	Rome, Italy	July 30, 2009
Pan American Games record	César Cielo Filho (BRA)	48.79	Rio de Janeiro, Brazil	July 18, 2007

== Qualification ==
Each National Olympic Committee (NOC) was able to enter up to two entrants providing they had met the A standard (50.4) in the qualifying period (January 1, 2010 to September 4, 2011). NOCs were also permitted to enter one athlete providing they had met the B standard (51.9) in the same qualifying period.

== Results ==
All times are in minutes and seconds.

KEY:	q	Fastest non-qualifiers	Q	Qualified	GR	Games record	NR	National record	PB	Personal best	SB	Seasonal best

=== Heats ===
The first round was held on October 16.

Rank	Heat	Lane	Name	Nationality	Time	Notes
1	3	4	César Cielo	Brazil	48.89	QA
2	3	3	Shaune Fraser	Cayman Islands	49.00	QA
3	3	5	Hanser García	Cuba	49.08	QA
4	2	5	Douglas Robison	United States	49.09	QA
5	1	4	Brett Fraser	Cayman Islands	49.16	QA
6	1	5	Robert Savulich	United States	49.58	QA
7	1	6	Cristian Quintero	Venezuela	49.87	QA
8	2	3	Benjamin Hockin	Paraguay	49.91	QA
9	1	3	Federico Grabich	Argentina	50.20	QB
10	3	6	Crox Acuña	Venezuela	50.35	QB
11	2	4	Bruno Fratus	Brazil	50.51	QB
12	2	6	Gabriel Melconian	Uruguay	51.02	QB
13	3	2	Rory Biskupski	Canada	51.12	QB
14	3	7	Shawn Clarke	Barbados	51.18	QB
15	2	1	Alejandro Escudero	Mexico	51.38	QB
16	1	7	Mario Montoya	Costa Rica	51.86	QB
17	2	7	Raúl Martínez	Puerto Rico	52.06	
18	3	1	Antonio Cisneros	Mexico	52.42	
19	2	2	Branden Whitehurst	U.S. Virgin Islands	52.45	
20	1	2	Roy-Allan Burch	Bermuda	52.87	
21	3	8	Perry Lindo	Netherlands Antilles	53.32	
22	1	1	Esau Simpson	Grenada	54.73	
23	1	8	Niall Roberts	Guyana	55.45	
24	2	8	Orel Jeffrey	Antigua and Barbuda	1:03.84	

=== B Final ===
The B final was also held on October 16.

Rank	Lane	Name	Nationality	Time	Notes
9	4	Federico Grabich	Argentina	49.95	
10	5	Gabriel Melconian	Uruguay	50.30	
11	6	Shawn Clarke	Barbados	51.00	
12	3	Rory Biskupski	Canada	51.15	
13	2	Alejandro Escudero	Mexico	51.66	
14	7	Mario Montoya	Costa Rica	51.83	
15	1	Raúl Martínez	Puerto Rico	51.94	
16	8	Antonio Cisneros	Mexico	52.55	

=== A Final ===
The A final was also held on October 16.

Rank	Lane	Name	Nationality	Time	Notes
1st place, gold medalist(s)	4	César Cielo	Brazil	47.84	GR
2nd place, silver medalist(s)	3	Hanser García	Cuba	48.34	
3rd place, bronze medalist(s)	5	Shaune Fraser	Cayman Islands	48.63	
4	6	Douglas Robison	United States	48.98	
5	2	Brett Fraser	Cayman Islands	49.07	
6	7	Robert Savulich	United States	49.62	
7	1	Cristian Quintero	Venezuela	49.75	
8	8	Benjamin Hockin	Paraguay	50.03	
