= 2011 Pan American Games opening ceremony =

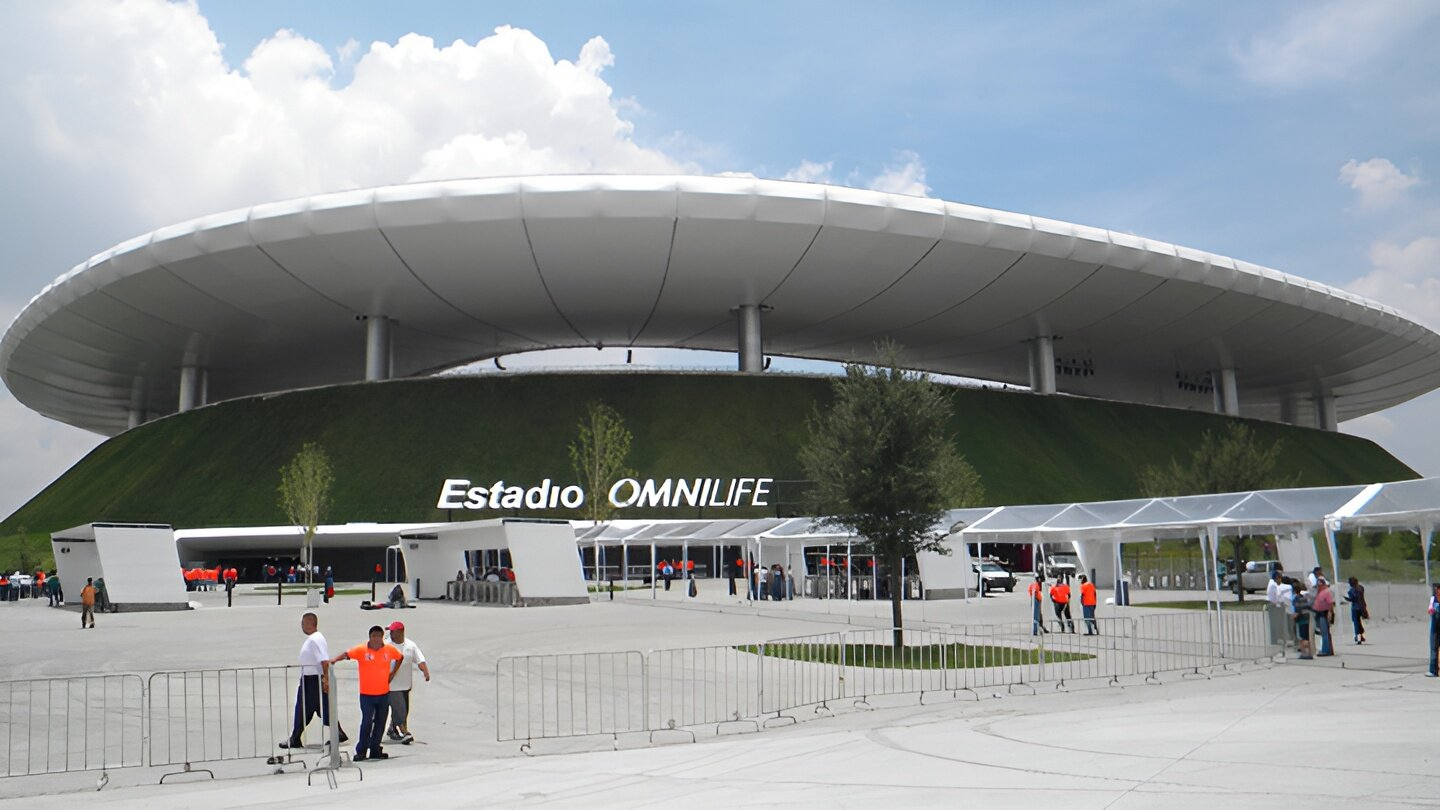
The Omnilife Stadium hosted the Opening Ceremony.

The opening ceremony of the 2011 Pan American Games took place on October 14, 2011, beginning at 20:00 CDT (1:00 UTC, October 15) at Omnilife Stadium in Zapopan, a suburb of Guadalajara, Jalisco, Mexico. The opening ceremony was directed and produced by Five Currents, which also produced the ceremonies at the 2002 Winter Olympics and the 2007 Pan American Games.

== Production ==
The opening ceremony was originally scheduled to be held at Jalisco Stadium. However, the organizing committee for the Games (COPAG) changed the venue to Omnilife Stadium, because of its superior infrastructure and technological capability to host the event. Also, its proximity to the athletes village helped expedite the transportation of athletes and helped ensure their safety.

== Program ==
Vicente Fernández performed the first act, singing the Mexican anthem at the games. Colombian singer Juanes performed as did Mexican singer Alejandro Fernández, Vicente’s son, who performed the song "El Mismo Sol" the official theme of the Games at the ceremony.

=== Parade of the Nations ===
The participating countries marched in, beginning with Argentina and ending with the host nation, Mexico. Excluding Argentina and Mexico, the delegations entered by Spanish alphabetical order as per Pan American Sports Organization protocols, which also happened to be the official languages of the host nation.

== Dignitaries and other officials in attendance ==
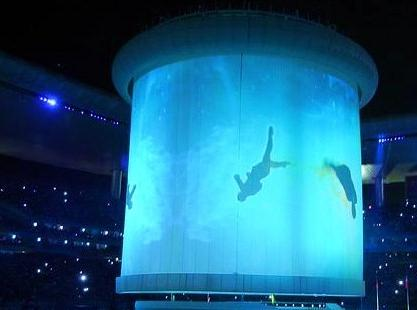
Opening ceremony.

- Felipe Calderón, President of Mexico
- Jacques Rogge, President of the International Olympic Committee
- Mario Vázquez Raña, President of the Pan American Sports Organization and Association of National Olympic Committees
- Emilio González Márquez, Governor of Jalisco
- Bal Gosal, Canadian Minister of Sport
- Andrade Garin, Head of the Guadalajara 2011 Organizing committee for the 2011 Pan and Parapan American Games (COPAG)
- Jorge Aristóteles Sandoval, Mayor of Guadalajara
- Earl Anthony Wayne, United States Ambassador to Mexico
- Julie Ertel, former water polo and triathlon athlete (United States)
- Allyson Felix, track and field athlete (United States)
- Julio Maglione, member of the IOC representing Uruguay and the president of FINA
- Rafael Márquez, Mexican footballer
- Julio César Chávez, Mexican boxer
- Michael Fennell, President of the Commonwealth Games Federation
- Julio Maglione, President of FINA

== Reception ==
An estimated 130 million people across the Americas and the world were expected to watch the opening ceremony.

== See also ==
- 2011 Pan American Games closing ceremony
