= Cayman Islands at the 2023 Pan American Games =

- IOC code: CAY
- NOC: Cayman Islands Olympic Committee

in Santiago, Chile 20 October 2023 – 5 November 2023
- Competitors: 7 in 4 sports
- Flag bearers (opening): James Allison & Sierrah Broadbelt
- Flag bearers (closing): Justin Hastings & Noel Squire
- Medals: Gold 0 Silver 0 Bronze 0 Total 0

Pan American Games appearances (overview)
- 1987; 1991; 1995; 1999; 2003; 2007; 2011; 2015; 2019; 2023; 2027

The Cayman Islands competed at the 2023 Pan American Games in Santiago, Chile from October 20 to November 5, 2023. This was the Cayman Islands's 10th appearance at the Pan American Games, having competed at every edition of the Games since 1987.

The Cayman Islands team consisted of seven athletes competing in four sports. Swimmers James Allison and Sierrah Broadbelt were the country's flagbearers during the opening ceremony. Meanwhile two male members of the delegation were the flagbearers during the closing ceremony. Golfer Justin Hastings and Noel Squire competing in the concurrently occurring Pan American E-sports Championships were the flagbearers.

== Competitors ==
The following is the list of number of competitors (per gender) participating at the games per sport/discipline.

Sport	Men	Women	Total
Athletics (track and field)	1	0	1
Golf	1	0	1
Sailing	0	1	1
Swimming	1	3	4
Total	3	4	7

== Athletics (track and field) ==
The Cayman Islands qualified a male track athlete.

Key

- Note–Ranks given for track events are within the athlete's heat only
- Q = Qualified for the next round
- q = Qualified for the next round as a fastest loser
- Bye = Athlete not required to compete in round

Track & road events

Athlete	Event	Semifinal		Final	
Athlete	Event	Result	Rank	Result	Rank
Rasheem Brown	Men's 110 m hurdles	—N/a		14.11	5

== Golf ==
The Cayman Islands qualified one male golfer.

Athlete	Event	Round 1	Round 2	Round 3	Round 4	Total		
Athlete	Event	Score	Score	Score	Score	Score	Par	Rank
Justin Hastings	Men's individual	72	71	63	74	280	−8	=11

== Sailing ==
The Cayman Islands qualified one boat for a total of one sailor.

Women

Athlete	Event	Opening series												Finals		
Athlete	Event	1	2	3	4	5	6	7	8	9	10	Points	Rank	M	Points	Rank
Charlotte Webster	Laser radial	12	12	~~13~~	12	11	12	13	12	12	12	108	12	Did not advance		

== Swimming ==
The Cayman Islands qualified four swimmers (one man and three women).

Key

- Note – Ranks given are for the entire round
- NR – National record
- Q – Qualified to the medal final
- q – Qualified to the non-medal final

Men

Athlete	Event	Heat		Final	
Athlete	Event	Time	Rank	Time	Rank
James Allison	50 m freestyle	24.00	24	Did not advance	
James Allison	100 m freestyle	52.05	23	Did not advance	
James Allison	200 m freestyle	1:55.45	15 q	1:53.19	13
James Allison	400 m freestyle	4:07.94	18 q	4:11.92	16

Women

Athlete	Event	Heat		Final	
Athlete	Event	Time	Rank	Time	Rank
Kyra Rabess	50 m freestyle	Did not start		Did not advance	
Kyra Rabess	100 m freestyle	59.81	32	Did not advance	
Kyra Rabess	400 m freestyle	4:32.60	12 q	4:28.49	11
Kyra Rabess	1500 m freestyle	—N/a		17:35.40	10
Harper Barrowman	100 m freestyle	1:02.28	37	Did not advance	
Harper Barrowman	200 m freestyle	2:11.95	22	Did not advance	
Harper Barrowman	400 m freestyle	4:32.65	13 q	4:28.38	10
Harper Barrowman	800 m freestyle	—N/a		9:18.17	11
Sierrah Broadbelt	100 m butterfly	1:04.48	24	Did not advance	
Sierrah Broadbelt	200 m butterfly	2:20.90	14 q	2:20.10	11
Sierrah Broadbelt	200 m individual medley	2:29.56	19	Did not advance	
Sierrah Broadbelt	400 m individual medley	5:15.81	17 q	5:17.56	15

== Demonstration sports ==
=== Esports ===
The Cayman Islands qualified one male athlete.

Men

- Noel Squire

== See also ==
- Cayman Islands at the 2024 Summer Olympics
