= Estadio Akron =

Sports stadium in Guadalajara, Jalisco, Mexico

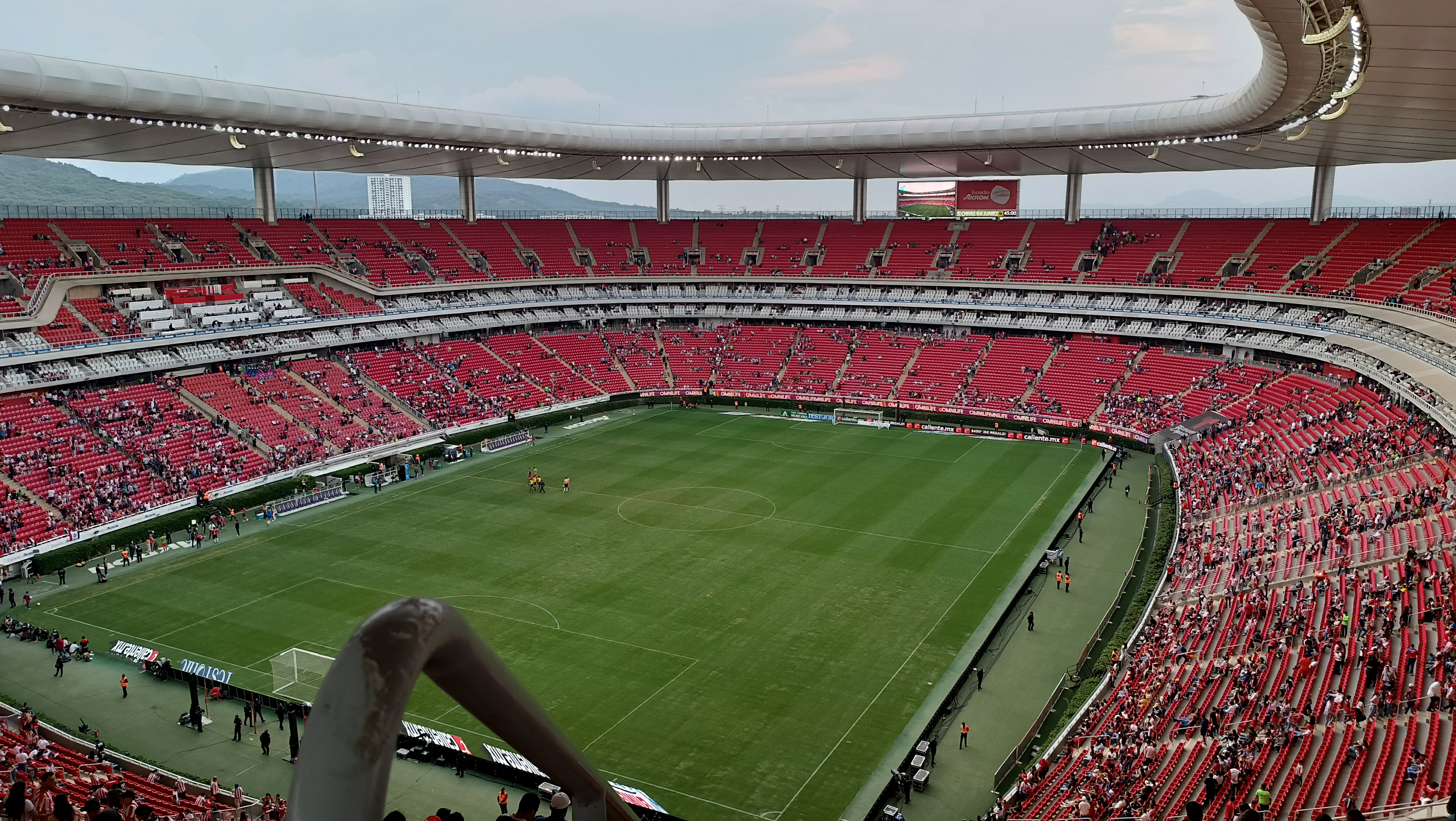
- View from southeast in 2022
- Interactive map of Estadio Akron
- Former names: Estadio Omnilife (2010–16); Estadio Chivas (2016–17); Estadio Guadalajara (2026 FIFA World Cup)
- Location: Zapopan, Jalisco, Mexico
- Coordinates: 20°40′54″N 103°27′46″W
- Elevation: 1,670 m (5,480 ft) AMSL
- Owner: Amaury Vergara
- Capacity: 49,813; 45,664 (2026 FIFA World Cup)
- Executive suites: 133
- Surface: Natural grass (2012–present); Artificial turf (2010–2012)
- Public transit: Estadio Chivas

Construction
- Groundbreaking: February 2004
- Opened: 30 July 2010; 16 years ago
- Cost: US$200 million ($295 million in 2025 dollars)
- Architects: Concept design: Jean Marie Massaud & Daniel Pouzet; Sports architects: Populous (formerly HOK Sport); Architect of Record: VFO architects

Tenants
- C.D. Guadalajara (2010–present); Mexico national football team (selected matches)

Website
- estadioakron.mx

Estadio Akron, formerly known as Estadio Omnilife and Estadio Chivas (Estadio Chivas, Spanish pronunciation: [esˈtaðjo ˈtʃiβas]), is a multipurpose stadium in Mexico, located in Zapopan, Jalisco, a suburb west of Guadalajara. Used mostly for football matches, it is the home of Liga MX side Guadalajara. The stadium is named for Grupo Akron, a Mexican lubricant and fuel company.

The stadium hosted its first major international event with the first leg of the 2010 Finals of the Copa Libertadores, and hosted the 2011 Pan American Games opening and closing ceremonies. The stadium's artificial field caused great controversy, drawing criticism from many notable players, and in May 2012, it was announced that the stadium would replace the artificial turf with natural grass. The stadium hosted four group stage matches during the 2026 FIFA World Cup.

== History ==
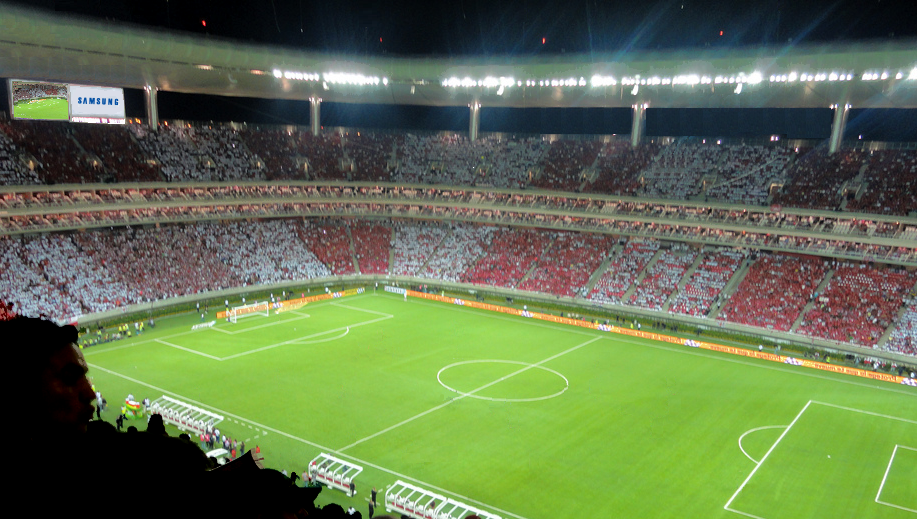
Inaugural match of the Omnilife Stadium vs. Manchester United

In February 2004, C.D. Guadalajara announced that it would construct a new stadium of its own, intending to leave Estadio Jalisco. After delays, construction on the stadium began in May 2007.

The third public football match at the stadium was a friendly between Guadalajara and Manchester United on 30 July 2010. Guadalajara won the game 3–2, with the first goal at the stadium scored by Javier "Chicharito" Hernández playing for Guadalajara. This match was held to represent Hernández's transfer from Guadalajara to Manchester United, with Hernández playing the first half for Guadalajara and switching sides to Manchester United in the second half, thus symbolically sealing his transfer contract that had been signed in March 2010.

The stadium hosted eight matches of the 2011 FIFA U-17 World Cup, including a semifinal, between Uruguay and Brazil.

It was also the venue of the opening and closing ceremonies of the 2011 Pan American Games, where it also hosted all the matches of both men's and women's football tournament.

In May 2012, following criticism regarding the artificial field, it was announced that the stadium would replace the artificial turf with natural grass. The replacement was complete by July.

In December 2017, the stadium changed its name from Estadio Omnilife to Estadio Akron, after signing a sponsorship deal with a car lubricants firm for 10 years.

The venue hosted the Canelo Álvarez vs. John Ryder boxing fight in 2023.

The Weeknd performed during his After Hours til Dawn Tour on 25 October 2023.

Shakira performed during her Las Mujeres Ya No Lloran World Tour on 16 and 17 March 2025.

=== 2026 FIFA World Cup ===
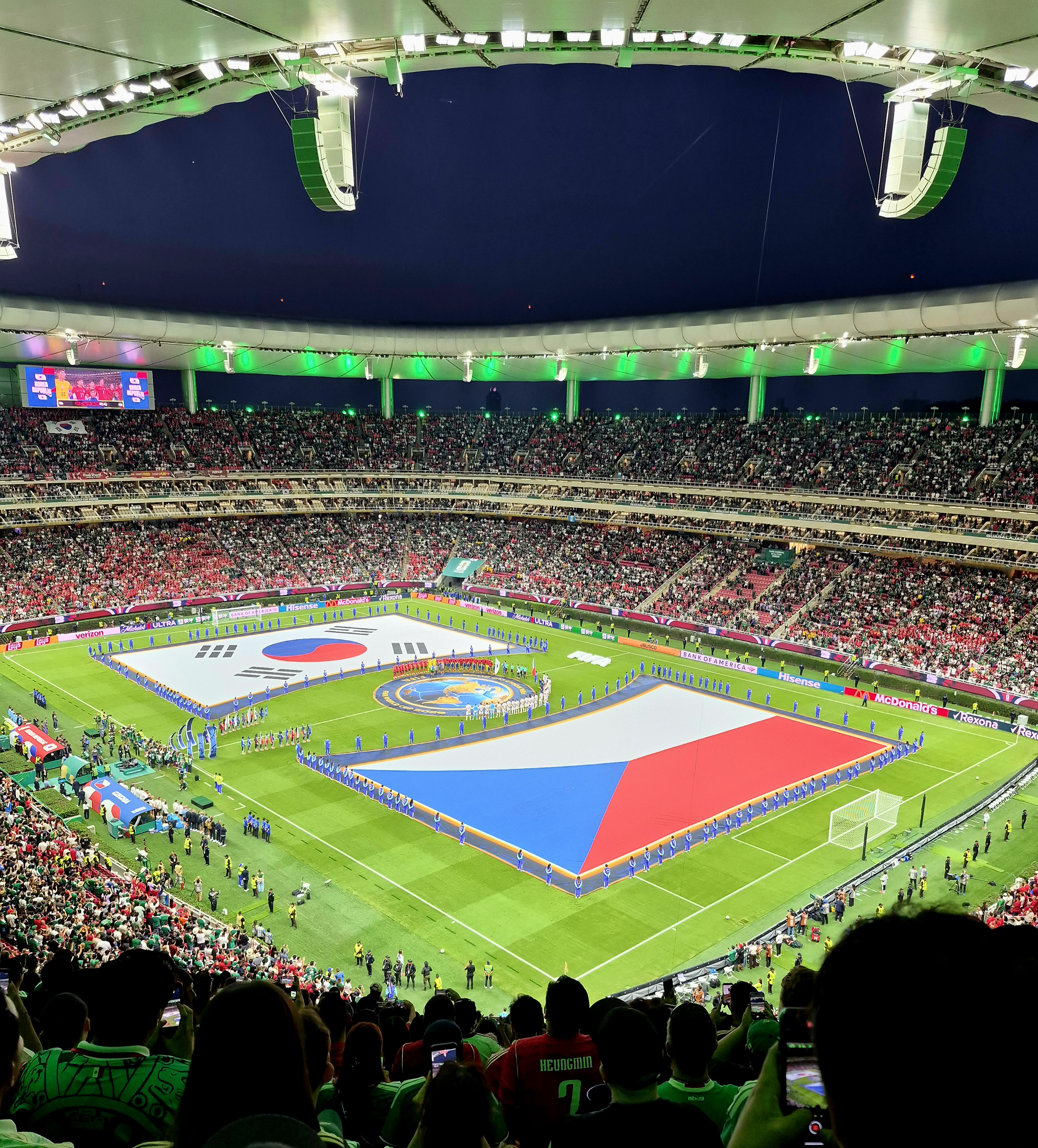
Inside the stadium prior to the South Korea vs. Czechia match during the 2026 FIFA World Cup

Estadio Akron hosted matches during the 2026 FIFA World Cup. During the event, the stadium was temporarily renamed to "Estadio Guadalajara" in accordance with FIFA's policy on corporate sponsored names. The stadium hosted four matches, all in the group stage, making it the only stadium to not host any knockout games. The venue also hosted Pathway 1 of the inter-confederation play-offs.

== Green space ==
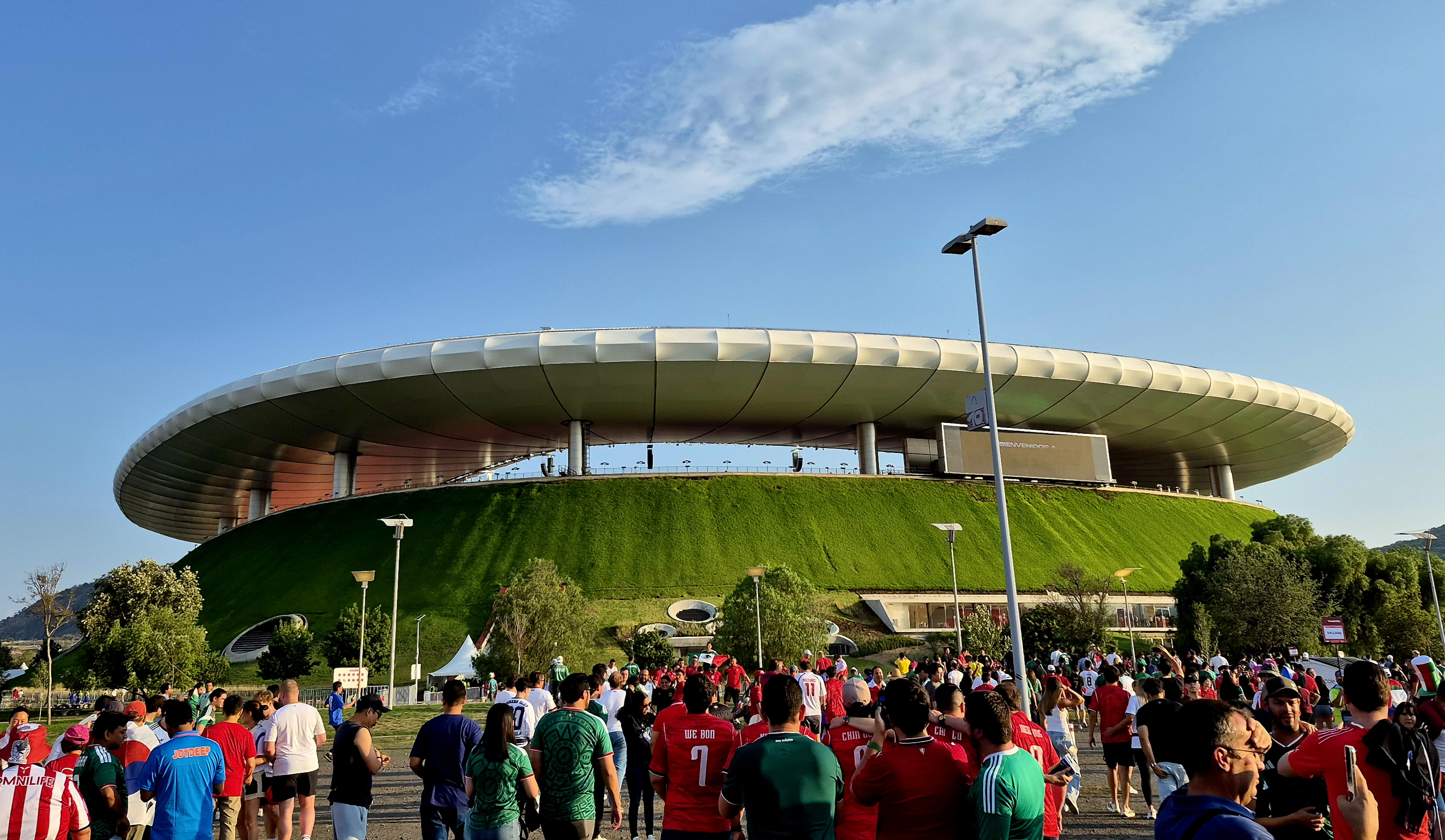
The exterior of the stadium showing the distinctive grass berm.

The stadium complex has more than 7 hectares of dedicated green space and a "green skin" covering the outer edges of the stadium berm. This creates an architectural motif of a cloud over a volcano, hence the stadium's nickname as the "Volcano Stadium". Native species, like oak varieties, are used to evoke the flora of La Primavera forest. The intention is to extend the forest into the stadium complex from the nearby natural reserve.

The use of natural grass creates a distinctive architectural element extending around the entire berm of the stadium. This maintains a year-round green surface and helps manage maintenance costs. Rainwater is collected from the complex, including from the roof and playfield, and directed to a storage tank to be filtered for non-potable use. This system can collect and filter over 30,000 m^{3} (7,900,000 U.S. gal) a year, which is used for irrigation, cleaning bleachers, and flushing toilets. Wastewater is transported by a sewer system to the JVC Center's treatment plant and then used for the complex's irrigation and other non-potable uses.

== International matches ==
=== Mexico national football team ===
Date	Team #1	Result	Team #2	Competition
4 September 2010	Mexico	1–2	Ecuador	Friendly
15 October 2024	Mexico	2–0	United States	Friendly
14 October 2025	Mexico	1–1	Ecuador	Friendly
18 June 2026	Mexico	1–0	South Korea	2026 FIFA World Cup

=== 2026 FIFA World Cup inter-confederation play-offs ===
Date	Time	Team #1	Result	Team #2	Attendance
26 March 2026	21:00	New Caledonia	0–1	Jamaica	40,983
31 March 2026	15:00	DR Congo	1–0 (a.e.t.)	Jamaica	39,983

=== 2026 FIFA World Cup ===
#	Date	Time	Team #1	Result	Team #2	Group	Attendance
2	11 June 2026	20:00	South Korea	2–1	Czech Republic	Group A	44,985
28	18 June 2026	19:00	Mexico	1–0	South Korea	Group A	45,522
48	23 June 2026	20:00	Colombia	1–0	DR Congo	Group K	45,358
66	26 June 2026	18:00	Uruguay	0–1	Spain	Group H	45,065

== Images ==
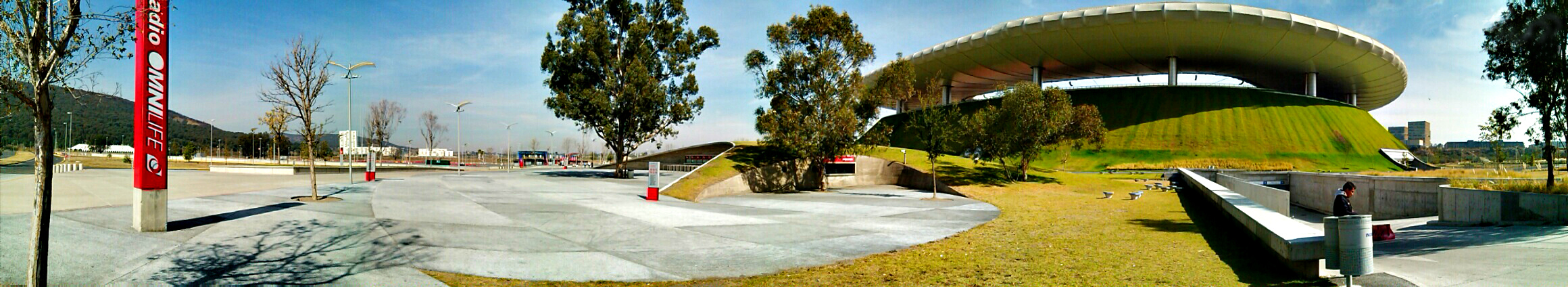
Side view of the stadium

Preceded by Estádio do Maracanã; Rio de Janeiro	Pan American Games; Opening and Closing Ceremonies; 2011	Succeeded by Rogers Centre; Toronto

Events and tenants
Preceded by Estadio Ciudad de La Plata (La Plata) ————————————————————— Mineirão (Belo Horizonte)	Copa Libertadores; Final Venues; 2010 * Estádio Beira-Rio (Porto Alegre)	Succeeded by TBA
