= Beni Bertrand Binobagira =

Burundian swimmer

Personal information
- Born: April 5, 1989 (age 37) Bujumbura, Burundi

Sport
- Sport: Swimming

Beni Bertrand Binobagira (born 5 April 1989) is a Burundian swimmer. At the 2012 Summer Olympics, he competed in the Men's 100 metre freestyle, finishing in 56th place overall in the heats, failing to qualify for the semifinals.
