= Gabriel Melconian Alvez =

Uruguayan swimmer

Gabriel Melconian
Personal information
- Full name: José Gabriel Melconian Alvez
- Nationality: Uruguay
- Born: July 7, 1987 (age 39) Montevideo, Uruguay
- Height: 1.82 m (6 ft 0 in)
- Weight: 74 kg (163 lb)

Sport
- Sport: Swimming
- Strokes: Freestyle
- Club: Club Biguá

Jose Gabriel Melconian Alvez (born July 7, 1987) is an Olympic freestyler swimmer from Uruguay, with Armenian background.

Melconian competed at the 2011 Pan American Games in the Men's 50 metre freestyle, Men's 100 metre freestyle and at the Men's 4 × 100 metre freestyle relay, finishing 9th, 12th and 5th respectively.

At the 2012 Summer Olympics, he competed in the Men's 100 metre freestyle, finishing in 35th place overall in the heats, failing to qualify for the semifinals.

His brother Martin Melconian is also a swimmer.
