= Cayman Islands at the 2007 Pan American Games =

- IOC code: CAY
- NOC: Cayman Islands Olympic Committee
- Website: www.caymanolympic.org.ky

in Rio de Janeiro 13–29 July 2007
- Competitors: 12
- Flag bearer: Christopher Jackson
- Medals Ranked 23rd: Gold 0 Silver 1 Bronze 0 Total 1

Pan American Games appearances (overview)
- 1987; 1991; 1995; 1999; 2003; 2007; 2011; 2015; 2019; 2023; 2027

The Cayman Islands competed in the 15th Pan American Games which were held in Rio de Janeiro, Brazil, between 13 July 2007 and 29 July 2007.

== Medals ==
=== Silver ===
===== Swimming =====
- Men's 200m Freestyle: Shaune Fraser

== See also ==
- Cayman Islands at the 2006 Commonwealth Games
- Cayman Islands at the 2008 Summer Olympics
