= Cayman Islands at the 1991 Pan American Games =

- IOC code: CAY
- NOC: Cayman Islands Olympic Committee
- Website: www.caymanolympic.org.ky

in Havana 8–18 August 1991
- Medals Ranked 27th: Gold 0 Silver 0 Bronze 0 Total 0

Pan American Games appearances (overview)
- 1987; 1991; 1995; 1999; 2003; 2007; 2011; 2015; 2019; 2023

The 11th Pan American Games were held in Havana, Cuba from August 2 to August 18, 1991.

== See also ==
- Cayman Islands at the 1990 Commonwealth Games
- Cayman Islands at the 1992 Summer Olympics
