= Cayman Islands at the 1987 Pan American Games =

- IOC code: CAY
- NOC: Cayman Islands Olympic Committee
- Website: www.caymanolympic.org.ky

in Indianapolis 7–23 August 1987
- Medals Ranked 27th: Gold 0 Silver 0 Bronze 0 Total 0

Pan American Games appearances (overview)
- 1987; 1991; 1995; 1999; 2003; 2007; 2011; 2015; 2019; 2023

The 10th Pan American Games were held in Indianapolis, Indiana, United States from 7 to 23 August 1987. The Caymans Islands made its debut at this edition of the Pan American Games.

== See also ==
- Cayman Islands at the 1986 Commonwealth Games
- Cayman Islands at the 1988 Summer Olympics
