= Donald McLean (sailor) =

Caymanian sailor

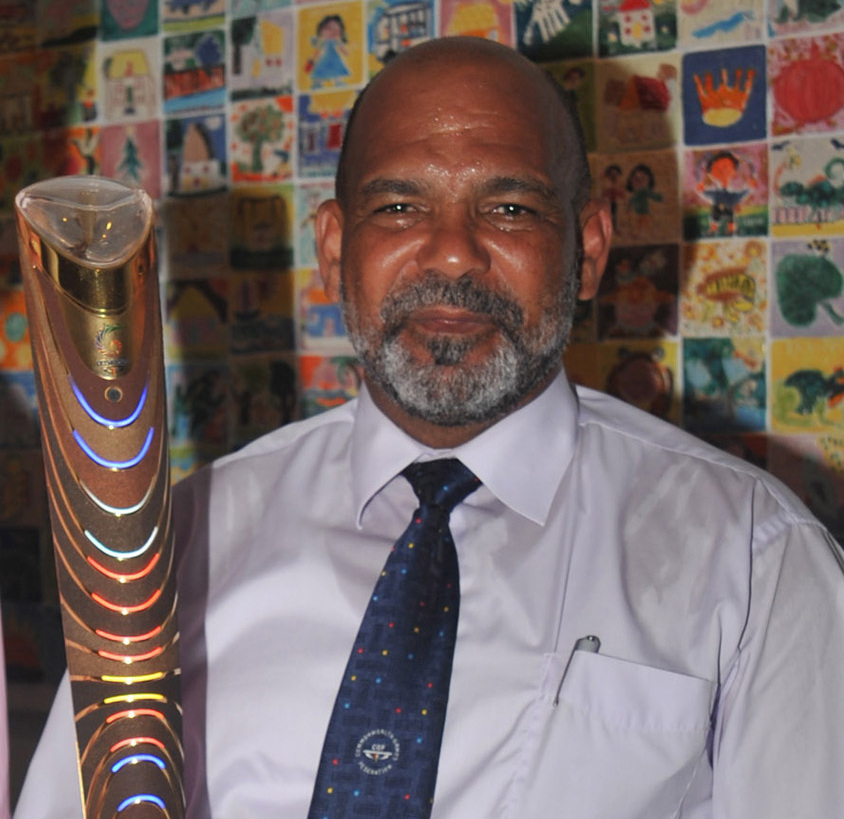
- McLean with the Queen's Baton 2010

Personal information
- Nationality: Caymanian
- Born: 20 September 1955 (age 69)

Sport
- Sport: Sailing

Donald McLean (born 20 September 1955) is a Caymanian sailor. He competed in the Star event at the 1996 Summer Olympics. He was the president of the Cayman Islands Olympic Committee from 2005 to 2020.
