= Swimming at the 2007 Pan American Games – Men's 200 metre freestyle =

The Men's 200m Freestyle at the 2007 Pan American Games occurred at the Maria Lenk Aquatic Park in Rio de Janeiro, Brazil, with the final being swum on July 20.

At this race, Shaune Fraser won the first medal of his country in swimming at Pan American Games at all times.

== Medalists ==
Gold	Matthew Owen; United States
Silver	Shaune Fraser; Cayman Islands
Bronze	Adam Sioui; Canada

== Results ==
=== Finals ===
Place	Swimmer	Country	Time	Note
1	Matthew Owen	United States	1:48.78	
2	Shaune Fraser	Cayman Islands	1:48.95	
3	Adam Sioui	Canada	1:48.97	
4	Nicolas Oliveira	Brazil	1:49.49	
5	Rodrigo Castro	Brazil	1:49.60	
6	Chad Hankewich	Canada	1:50.11	
7	Robert Margalis	United States	1:50.49	
8	Amauri Rodriguez	Mexico	1:52.18	
