= 2011 Pan American Games closing ceremony =

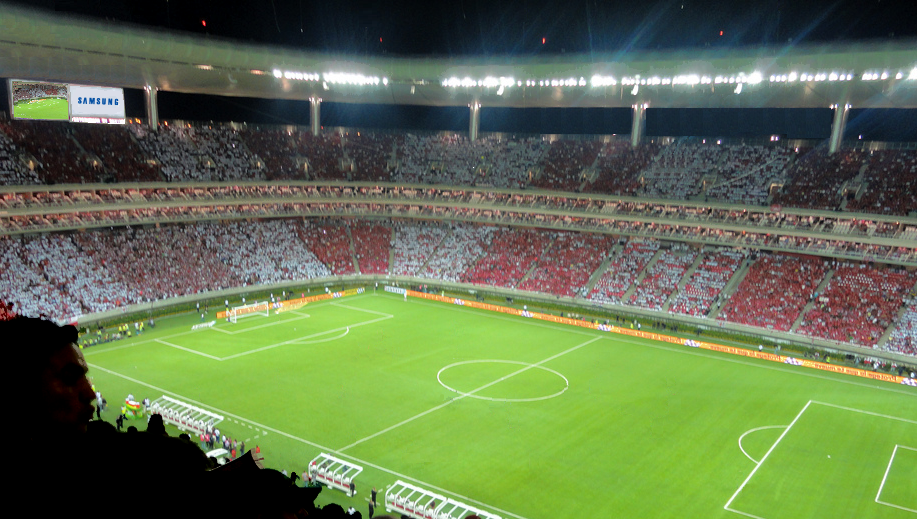
The Omnilife Stadium hosted the Closing Ceremony.

The Closing Ceremony of the 2011 Pan American Games took place on October 30, 2011, beginning at 6:00 pm CST (00:30 UTC, October 31) at Omnilife Stadium in Guadalajara, Jalisco, Mexico.

The closing ceremony was originally scheduled to be held at Jalisco Stadium. However, the organizing committee for the Games (COPAG) changed the venue to Omnilife Stadium, because of its superior infrastructure and technological capability to host the event. Also, its proximity to the athletes village helped expedite the transportation of athletes and helped ensure their safety.

As per tradition, the Pan American Sports Organization flag was presented to the mayor of the next host city, Rob Ford of Toronto.

Puerto Rican singer Ricky Martin and The Wailers performed at the ceremony.

== Dignitaries and other officials in attendance ==
- David Johnston, Governor General of Canada
- Bal Gosal, Canadian Minister of Sport
- Charles Sousa, Ontario Minister of Labour and minister responsible for the 2015 Pan and Parapan Games
- Rob Ford, Mayor of Toronto

== National anthems ==
- Ely Guerra, national anthem of Mexico
- Florence K, national anthem of Canada
