= Shaune Fraser =

Swimmer (born 1988)

Shaune David Fraser
Personal information
- Full name: Shaune David Fraser
- National team: Cayman Islands
- Born: March 29, 1988 (age 38) George Town, Cayman Islands
- Height: 1.86 m (6 ft 1 in)
- Weight: 86 kg (190 lb)
- Website: http://www.fraserpllc.com

Sport
- Sport: Swimming
- Strokes: Freestyle, butterfly, individual medley
- Club: Stingray Swim Club
- College team: University of Florida
Medal record
Men's swimming
Representing Cayman Islands
Pan American Games
Silver medal – second place	2007 Rio de Janeiro	200 m freestyle
Silver medal – second place	2011 Guadalajara	200 m freestyle
Bronze medal – third place	2011 Guadalajara	100 m freestyle
Central American and Caribbean Games
Gold medal – first place	2006 Cartagena	200 m freestyle
Silver medal – second place	2006 Cartagena	100 m freestyle
Silver medal – second place	2006 Cartagena	200 m medley
Gold medal – first place	2010 Mayagüez	200 m freestyle
Bronze medal – third place	2010 Mayagüez	100 m freestyle

Shaune David Fraser (born March 29, 1988) is an attorney the founder of Fraser Immigration Law, PLLC. He was also a former competitive swimmer and Pan American Games silver medalist from the Cayman Islands. Fraser represented the Cayman Islands at the 2004, 2008, and 2012 Summer Olympics where he qualified for the Semi-Finals.^{[1]}

Based in Miami, FL, Fraser Immigration Law, PLLC is a U.S. immigration law firm specialized in extraordinary ability visas and green card applications for entrepreneurs, professional athletes, Olympians, researchers and scientists, multinational executives, and professionals across a wide range of fields. Fraser Immigration Law, PLLC specializes in strategic immigration representation for individuals and corporations in the fields of financial technology, software engineering, corporate executives, athletics, competitive swimming, the arts, and the music and entertainment industries, among others.

Fraser graduated from the Bolles School, a private high school located in Jacksonville, Florida, known for its excellent prep swim teams. He received an athletic scholarship to attend the University of Florida in Gainesville, Florida, where he was a finance major and swam for coach Gregg Troy's Florida Gators swimming and diving team in National Collegiate Athletic Association (NCAA) competition from 2006 to 2010. At the 2009 Men's NCAA Division I Championships, he set a school record in winning the 200-yard freestyle (1:31.70) and an NCAA record in winning the 200-yard butterfly (1:40.75). Fraser earned twenty-seven All-American accolades in his four years as a Gator swimmer, one fewer than the maximum number possible, and the most of any male swimmer in Gators history.

Fraser's younger brother, Brett Fraser, swam for the Cayman Islands at the 2008 Summer Olympics, and also swam for the University of Florida, where he graduated a year behind his brother.

At the 2006 Central American and Caribbean Games in Cartagena, Colombia, he set the Games record in the 200-meter freestyle (1:49.84), bettering the 24-year-old mark of 1:51.71 set by Venezuela's Alberto Mestre at the 1982 Games. At the 2007 Pan American Games in Rio de Janeiro, Fraser garnered a silver medal in the 200-meter freestyle. Four years later at the 2011 Pan American Games in Guadalajara, Mexico, Fraser again won the silver medal in the men's 200-meter freestyle, finishing second behind his brother Brett.

== See also ==
- List of University of Florida alumni
- List of University of Florida Olympians
