= 2011 Pan American Games =

16th edition of the Pan American Games

XVI Pan American Games
- Host: Guadalajara, Mexico
- Motto: The Party of the Americas; Spanish: La Fiesta de las Américas
- Nations: 42
- Athletes: 5,996
- Events: 361 in 36 sports
- Opening: October 14
- Closing: October 30
- Opened by: President Felipe Calderón
- Cauldron lighter: Paola Espinosa
- Main venue: Estadio Omnilife

The 2011 Pan American Games, officially the XVI Pan American Games (Spanish: XVI Juegos Panamericanos) and commonly known as Guadalajara 2011, were an international multi-sport event held from October 14–30, 2011, in Guadalajara, Mexico. Some events were held in the nearby cities of Ciudad Guzmán, Puerto Vallarta, Lagos de Moreno and Tapalpa. It was the largest multi-sport event of 2011, with approximately 6,000 athletes from 42 nations participating in 36 sports. Both the Pan American and Parapan American Games were organized by the Guadalajara 2011 Organizing Committee (COPAG). The 2011 Pan American Games were the third Pan American Games hosted by Mexico (the first country to do so) and the first held in the state of Jalisco. Previously, Mexico hosted the 1955 Pan American Games and the 1975 Pan American Games, both in Mexico City. The 2011 Parapan American Games were held 20 days after the Pan American Games had ended.

Following PASO tradition, Jalisco governor Emilio González Márquez and then Guadalajara mayor Alfonso Petersen Farah received the Pan American Sports Organization flag during the closing ceremony of the 2007 Pan American Games in Rio de Janeiro, Brazil. The event was officially opened by the President of Mexico Felipe Calderón. Brett Fraser, a swimmer from the Cayman Islands, won the first Pan American Games gold medal for his country, while Saint Kitts and Nevis won its first ever Pan American Games medal of any kind.

== Organization ==
=== Bidding process ===
PASO selected the city unanimously as the host for 16th Pan American Games on Friday, June 2, 2006, at its 44th general assembly held in Buenos Aires, Argentina. Guadalajara was the only city to officially bid for the 2011 Pan American Games. This may have been in part due to no announced and/or open candidature period for the event. Guadalajara initially bid for the 2003 Pan American Games which were held in Santo Domingo, Dominican Republic. San Antonio, United States, which bid for the 2007 Games, declined to bid for the 2011 games.

=== Infrastructure and budget ===
Inspired by the 1992 Summer Olympic Games, Guadalajara used the Games as a clear way to build sports infrastructure, according to Ivar Sisniega, Guadalajara 2011 international relations and sports director. Guadalajara, a metropolitan area of five million people, is a destination for cultural and business travellers.

Horacio de la Vega, marketing director for Guadalajara 2011, cited the 1992 Summer Olympics in Barcelona as the inspiration for infrastructure improvements, saying that "Barcelona wasn't Barcelona before it got the Olympic Games. In a more modest sense, we are doing the same in Guadalajara". The budget was estimated at US$200 million, of which $180 million was reserved for sports infrastructure. Some of the funding went to general street improvements and public transportation. Dr. Carlos Andrade was the head of the organizing committee.

However, as the Games drew closer to starting, it was revealed that the costs of building the venues and the athletes' village had more than tripled to US$750 million.

The city planned to build a new convention center and undertake road improvements. Additional plans called for transit improvements, a performing arts theater (Auditorio Telmex) and a new public library. Guadalajara increased the number of available hotel rooms by 5,000 for the games.

By April, the Games had made over US$50 million revenue from television rights and sponsors, which was more than the previous Games in Rio de Janeiro. The organizing committee had aimed for a revenue of about $70 million by the end of the Games. The organizing committee also expected to sell about one million tickets, which went on sale on May 13, 2011.

In June 2011, four months before the Games, Carlos Andrade stated that no construction concerns remained for Guadalajara. He said that all 23 stadiums being built would be ready for the start of the games.

=== Venues ===
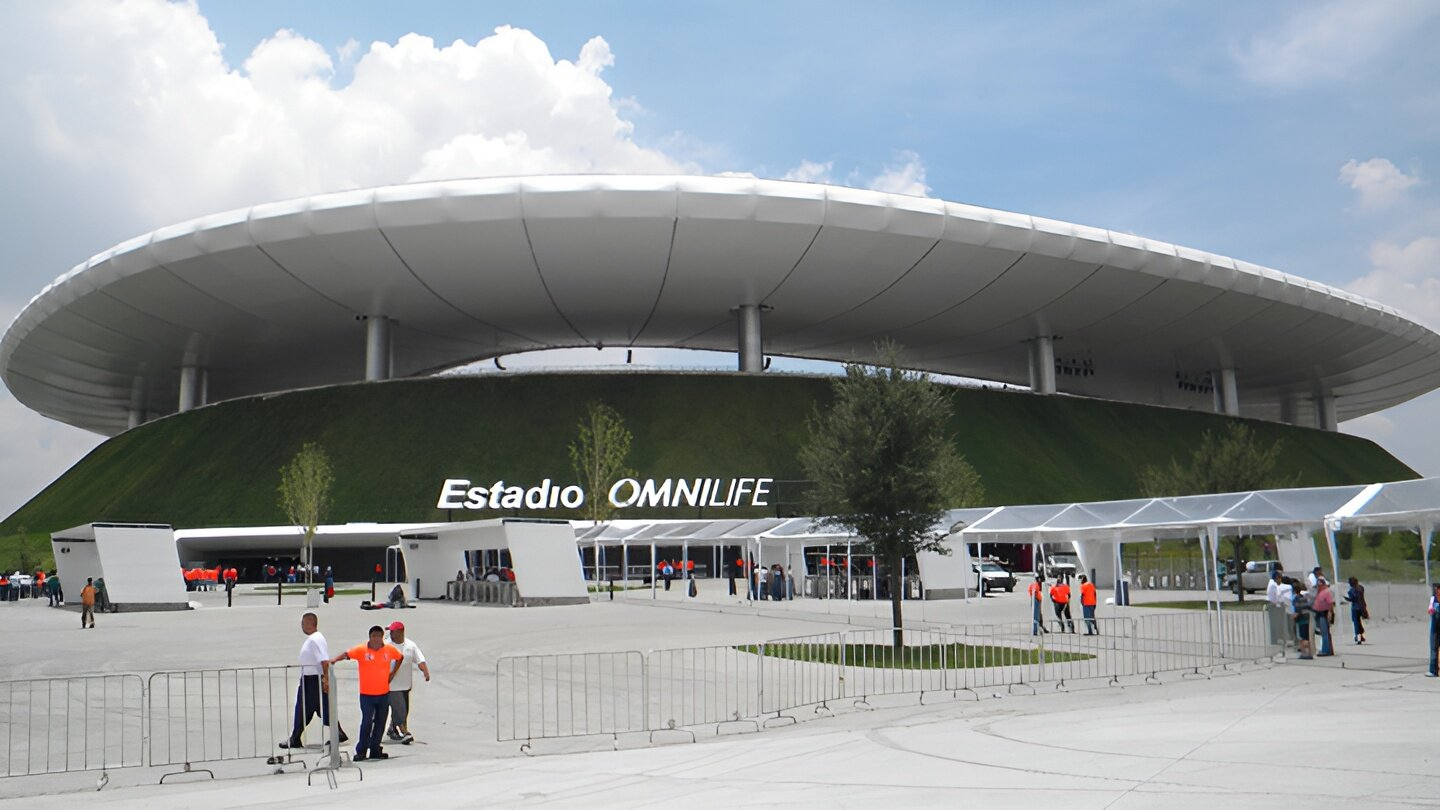
The Estadio Omnilife hosted the opening and closing ceremonies.

The aquatic centre has two Olympic-size pools and a diving platform. The athletic facility was expanded to 15,000 during the Games and then was converted back to 5,000 seats. Puerto Vallarta was the main subsite when hosted the sailing, marathon swimming, triathlon, and beach volleyball.

Other cities that co-hosted the event are Tapalpa (mountain biking), Ciudad Guzmán (rowing and canoeing) and Lagos de Moreno (baseball).

The opening and closing ceremonies were held at the Estadio Omnilife, which was constructed in 2010 for the C.D. Guadalajara football team (colloquially known as "Chivas"). Originally, the bigger and older Estadio Jalisco was scheduled to host the ceremonies, but the organizing committee decided to move to the newer and more technologically advanced Estadio Omnilife. The change of ceremonies venue to the Estadio Omnilife organizers also held a parade to be held through the streets of Guadalajara and an increase in the use of modern technologies and a better use of the fire. Other venues that already existed in Guadalajara included the Weightlifting Forum and the CODE Dome. Most other venues for the games had to be constructed or expanded temporarily to host the games.

10 new venues were planned, including a volleyball arena, covered velodrome, shooting range, and a basketball arena. The 3,500-seat gymnastics stadium, which cost $5.5 million, was the first venue specifically built for the Games to open in March 2008.

In total about 35 different venues were used, with a majority of them being newly built specifically for the Games.

=== Torch relay ===
The Pan American Torch Relay brought the torch from Mexico City to the Estadio Omnilife for the opening ceremony.

The relay took the torch through all 32 Mexican states on a 50-day route starting on August 26 at the pyramids of Teotihuacan outside Mexico City. About 3,500 runners carried the torch on the 15,000-kilometer route. The torch arrived in Puerto Vallarta on October 9, Ciudad Guzmán on October 11, Tapalpa on October 12, Lagos de Moreno on October 13 and Guadalajara on October 14. The torch relay was sponsored by local nutrition company Grupo Omnilife.

The torch design depicted agave leaves protecting the Pan American flame. It was designed by Vatti, the same company that designed the torch for the 2008 Summer Olympics. The torch relay was organized by the Mexican Olympic Committee.

== The Games ==
=== Opening ceremony ===
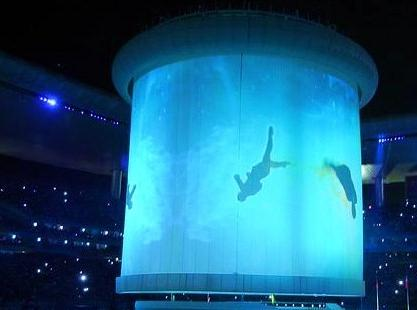
A scene from the Opening ceremony.

The opening ceremony of the Games took place on October 14, 2011, at 8:00 pm CDT (01:00 UTC, October 15) at Estadio Omnilife. The opening ceremony was produced by Five Currents, who also produced the 2002 Winter Olympics Opening Ceremony.

=== Participating teams ===
All 41 members of PASO competed at the Games. The Netherlands Antilles Olympic Committee, which had planned to continue functioning after the dissolution of the Netherlands Antilles, had its membership withdrawn by the IOC Executive Committee at the 123rd IOC Session in July 2011. However, it took steps to allow athletes to compete under the PASO flag.

The number of competitors qualified by each delegation is indicated in parentheses.

Participating countries.

Participating National Olympic Committees
- Antigua and Barbuda (7)
- Argentina (486)
- Aruba (17)
- Bahamas (22)
- Barbados (52)
- Belize (10)
- Bermuda (14)
- Bolivia (34)
- Brazil (519)
- British Virgin Islands (3)
- Canada (492)
- Cayman Islands (12)
- Chile (308)
- Colombia (284)
- Costa Rica (90)
- Cuba (443)
- Dominica (5)
- Dominican Republic (214)
- Ecuador (167)
- El Salvador (78)
- Grenada (5)
- Guatemala (140)
- Guyana (19)
- Haiti (12)
- Honduras (22)
- Jamaica (61)
- Mexico (638)
- Netherlands Antilles (11)
- Nicaragua (31)
- Panama (47)
- Paraguay (28)
- Peru (137)
- Puerto Rico (254)
- Saint Lucia (4)
- Saint Kitts and Nevis (6)
- Saint Vincent and the Grenadines (4)
- Suriname (11)
- Trinidad and Tobago (94)
- United States (618)
- Uruguay (113)
- Virgin Islands (16)
- Venezuela (385)

=== Sports ===
36 sports were contested at the Games. With sports such as diving, a sub-discipline of aquatics, included, the number goes up to 40 sports. Futsal, which was added as a sport for the 2007 Pan American Games was dropped from the program. Rugby sevens replaced futsal at the games, appearing on the games program for the first time. Racquetball and basque pelota also returned to the program after missing the last games in Rio de Janeiro. There were 361 medal events in total. The 2011 Pan American Games had qualification standards for every sport just like the Olympic Games. 15 out of the 26 current Summer Olympic sports, including canoeing, handball, and modern pentathlon, will use the Pan American Games as a qualifier for the 2012 Summer Olympics in London.

Numbers in parentheses indicate the number of medal events contested in each sport.

- Aquatics
  - Diving (8)
  - Swimming (34)
  - Synchronized swimming (2)
  - Water polo (2)
- Archery (4)
- Athletics (47)
- Badminton (5)
- Baseball (1)
- Basketball (2)
- Basque pelota (10)
- Bowling (4)
- Boxing (13)
- Canoeing (12)
- Cycling
  - BMX (2)
  - Mountain biking (2)
  - Road (4)
  - Track (10)
- Equestrian (6)
- Fencing (12)
- Field hockey (2)
- Football (2)
- Gymnastics
  - Artistic (14)
  - Rhythmic (8)
  - Trampoline (2)
- Handball (2)
- Judo (14)
- Karate (10)
- Modern pentathlon (2)
- Racquetball (6)
- Roller skating (8)
- Rowing (14)
- Rugby sevens (1)
- Sailing (9)
- Shooting (15)
- Softball (1)
- Squash (6)
- Table tennis (4)
- Taekwondo (8)
- Tennis (5)
- Triathlon (2)
- Volleyball (4)
- Water skiing (9)
- Weightlifting (15)
- Wrestling (18)

=== Calendar ===
OC	Opening ceremony	●	Event competitions	1	Event finals	EG	Exhibition gala	CC	Closing ceremony

October	14th Fri	15th Sat	16th Sun	17th Mon	18th Tue	19th Wed	20th Thu	21st Fri	22nd Sat	23rd Sun	24th Mon	25th Tue	26th Wed	27th Thu	28th Fri	29th Sat	30th Sun	Events
Ceremonies	OC																CC	
Archery				●	●	●	●	2	2									4
Athletics										3	5	6	9	10	12	1	1	47
Badminton		●	●	●	●	2	3											5
Baseball						●	●	●	●		●	1						1
Basketball								●	●	●	●	1	●	●	●	●	1	2
Basque pelota								●	●	●	●	●	4	6				10
Bowling											●	2	●	2				4
Boxing								●	●	●	●	●	●		6	7		13
Canoeing													1	1	5	5		12
Cycling		2	2	3	2	2	3	2	2									18
Diving													2	2	2	2		8
Equestrian			1	●		1		●	●	2			●	1		1		6
Fencing											2	2	2	2	2	2		12
Field hockey						●	●	●	●	●	●		●	●	1	1		2
Football					●	●	●	●	●	●		●	●	1	1			2
Gymnastics		1	1	3	5						1	1	2	5	5	EG		24
Handball		●	●	●	●	●	●	●	●	1	1							2
Judo													3	4	4	3		14
Karate														2	4	4		10
Modern pentathlon		1	1															2
Racquetball				●	●	●	●	●	4	●	●	2						6
Roller skating										●	2		2	4				8
Rowing		●	●	4	5	5												14
Rugby sevens																●	1	1
Sailing				●	●	●		●	●	9								9
Shooting			2	2	2	3	1	2	3									15
Softball				●	●	●	●	●	●	1								1
Squash		●	●	4	●	●	●	2										6
Swimming		5	5	4	5	5	4	4	2									34
Synchronized swimming					●	●	1	1										2
Table tennis		●	●	2	●	●	2											4
Taekwondo		2	2	2	2													8
Tennis				●	●	●	●	3	2									5
Triathlon										2								2
Volleyball		●	●	●	●	●	1	1	1		●	●	●	●	●	1		4
Water polo										●	●	●	●	●	1	1		2
Water skiing							●	●	3	6								9
Weightlifting										3	3	3	3	3				15
Wrestling							4	3	4	4	3							18
Total events		11	14	24	21	18	19	20	23	31	17	18	28	43	43	28	3	361
Cumulative total		11	25	49	70	88	107	127	150	181	198	216	244	287	330	358	361	
October	14th Fri	15th Sat	16th Sun	17th Mon	18th Tue	19th Wed	20th Thu	21st Fri	22nd Sat	23rd Sun	24th Mon	25th Tue	26th Wed	27th Thu	28th Fri	29th Sat	30th Sun	Events

=== Medal table ===
The top ten listed NOCs by number of gold medals are listed below with the host nation, Mexico, being highlighted. The design of the medals is intended to represent the heart of the agave plant and thus represent the Jalisco region.

* Host nation (Mexico)

Rank	NOC	Gold	Silver	Bronze	Total
1	United States	92	79	66	237
2	Cuba	58	35	43	136
3	Brazil	48	35	58	141
4	Mexico*	42	41	50	133
5	Canada	30	40	49	119
6	Colombia	24	25	35	84
7	Argentina	21	19	34	74
8	Venezuela	11	27	33	71
9	Dominican Republic	7	9	17	33
10	Ecuador	7	8	9	24
11–29	Remaining	21	45	59	125
Totals (29 entries)		361	363	453	1,177

=== Closing ceremony ===
The closing ceremony of the games took place on October 30, 2011, beginning at 8:00 pm CST (02:00 UTC, October 31) at Estadio Omnilife. As per tradition, the Pan American Sports Organization flag was handed over to the mayor of the next host city, Rob Ford of Toronto.

== Marketing ==
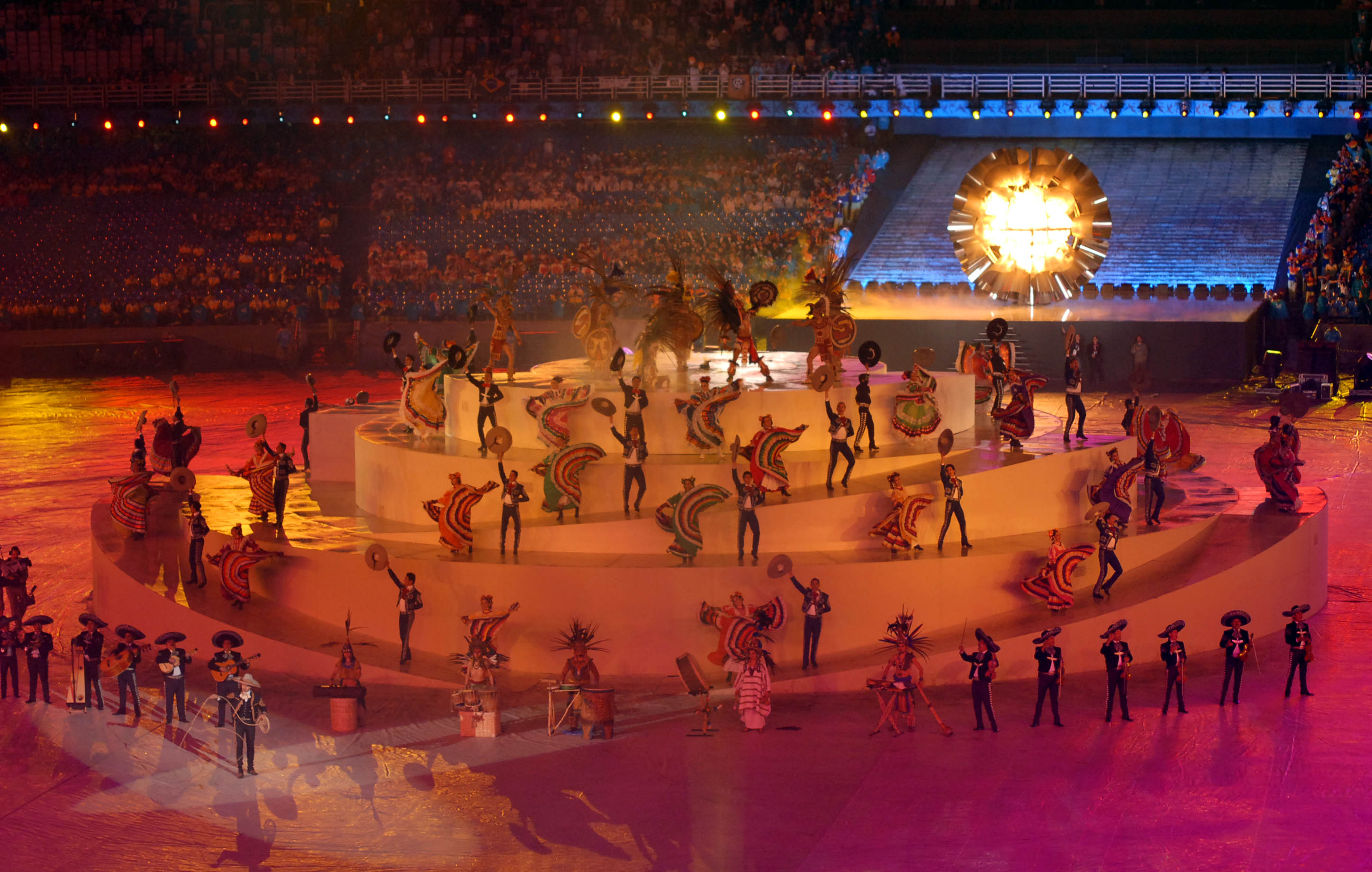
The handover presentation during the 2007 Pan American Games closing ceremony.

Marketing for the Games began in 2007 at the closing ceremony of the 2007 Pan American Games in Rio de Janeiro with a handover ceremony to the next host city. The state and national governments arranged for signs and billboards. Two TV networks, Televisa and TV Azteca, signed contracts to broadcast the Games and to advertise them. Famous athletes from Mexico, including diver Fernando Platas and golfer Lorena Ochoa, were also named ambassadors to promote the games. The organizing committee also signed a marketing deal with SKY México, which operates in several countries. The network created a channel dedicated to the games. Classes were suspended in Guadalajara during the games to give students the chance to attend.

=== Sponsors ===
There were four official sponsors for the Games: Scotiabank, Telcel, Nissan and Telmex. Accordingly, some of the venues were named after these sponsors, such as the Scotiabank Aquatics Center, Nissan Gymnastics Stadium, Telcel Tennis Complex and the Telmex Athletics Stadium. Children International was also an official benefactor of the Pan American Games. "Second tier" and "third tier" sponsors included Technogym and others.

Sponsors of the 2011 Pan American Games
Official Partners
- América Móvil (Telcel, Telmex)
- Expo Guadalajara
- Nissan
- Scotiabank
Official Suppliers
- Bonafont
- Comex Group
- Dormimundo
- Galerías Guadalajara
- Grupo Aeroportuario del Pacífico
- Grupo Martí
- Grupo Omnilife
- ManpowerGroup
- MaxiGas Natural
- PepsiCo (Gatorade)
- Technogym
Official Collaborators
- Alsea
- AM-PM
- Arena
- Atletica
- Embutidos Corona
- Grupo Bajo Cero
- Gymnova
- La Moderna
- Molten Corporation
- Myvame
- Quesos Cremas Esmeralda
- SaniRent
- Santo Coyote
- Tequila Herradura
- Voit
- Volaris
- Witen Sports
- Grupo AlEn (Cloralex, Pinol)

=== Theme song ===
The song El mismo Sol (The Same Sun) was the official theme song of the Games. It was written by Peruvian singer-songwriter Gian Marco, produced by Chilean Humberto Gatica in Los Angeles, and performed by Mexican singer Alejandro Fernández.

=== Mascots ===
From left to right: Huichi, Leo and Gavo.

The mascots for the 2011 Pan American Games and the 2011 Parapan American Games were Huichi, Gavo, and Leo. The organizing committee unveiled the mascots at the Plaza Andares Amphitheater in Guadalajara on November 28, 2009, and the mascots were officially named on February 10, 2010.

The co-creators of the mascots were José Luis Andrade (Leo), Ángel Barba Barrera (Huichi), and Fernando Sanchez (Gavo). Each received $2,584. The mascots represented the state of Jalisco and the city of Guadalajara.

- Gavo — A blue agave (agave azul) plant that is representative of the region which is famous for its tequila production.
- Huichi — A deer, to represent the southern part of the state
- Leo — A lion, to represents the strong people of Guadalajara. The lion is present in the city's coat of arms.

== Concerns and controversies ==
=== Security ===
Guadalajara, due to the ongoing Mexican drug war, had seen escalating violence. Some countries, including the United States and Canada, expressed concerns about the safety and security of the region. Scott Backmun of the United States Olympic Committee (USOC) raised concerns about the city's ability to host the games in light of the drug war. Due to the increased safety issues the USOC had its own security plan for the games. During a meeting of the USOC in March 2011, chief security officer Larry Buendorf gave a report to the rest of the committee in which he said, "We’re going to prepare for Guadalajara like we would any other Games. A lot of that is just preparing your athletes for the individual environments that they’re going into. Everybody is quite aware of the violence that has happened. We’re obviously concerned about it, and at the end of the day, I think we have a good security plan in place to try to protect our athletes". After grenades were thrown near a nightclub entrance in two separate incidents in February 2011, organizers said they were making security a priority and arranged for police and members of the armed forces to patrol in Guadalajara throughout the Games.

=== Athletes' village ===
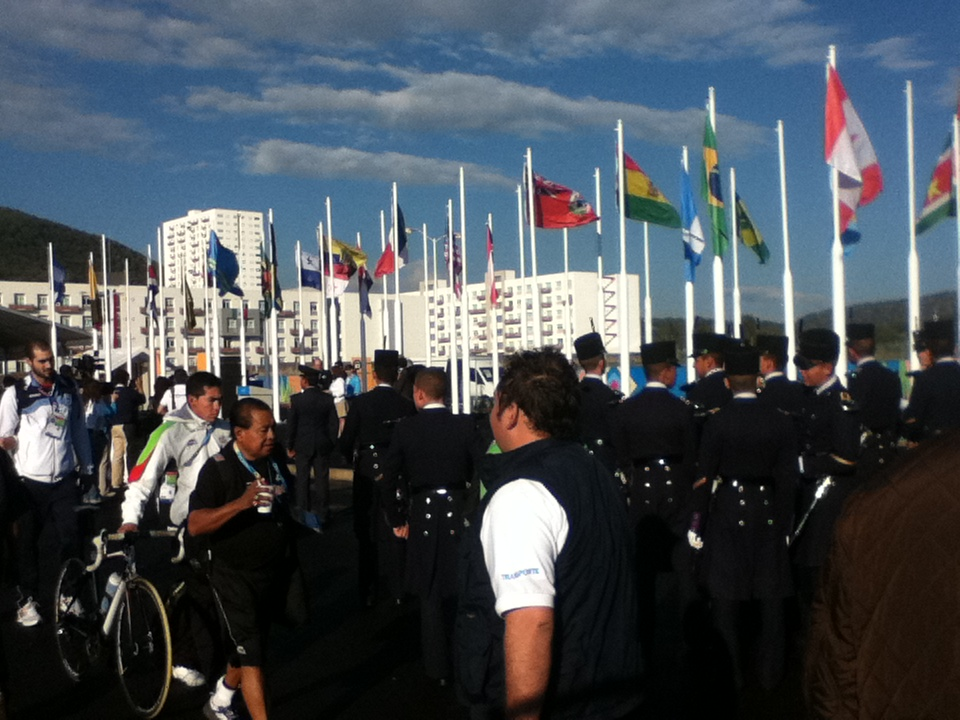
The Pan American Games village during the games.

The athletes' village was behind schedule for the entire time it was under construction, and in May 2011, about five months before the start of the games, the courts ordered work on the village to halt when residents of Zapopan said the construction would adversely affect their drinking water supply. Carlos Andrade Garin, the director of the organizing committee, said even a short delay in construction would mean the games would have to be canceled.

According to Garin, "we have some crabs [people who don't want to go forward] who don't like our state to grow, who don't like us having a great event, whose own related interests are more important than those of the community. Unfortunately, you can't do anything against this kind of people, except get on with our own job."

After many delays, organizers finally asserted that the athletes' village would be finished no later than September, only a month before the Games were to begin. The village was expected to be handed over to COPAG by August 22, 2011.

=== Venue delays ===
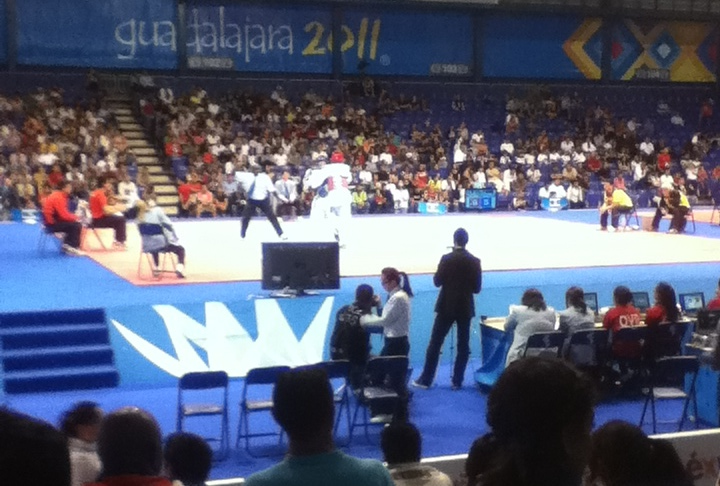
The Taekwondo competition at the 2011 Pan American Games.

Another concern with the Games was that venue construction had fallen behind. In 2009, two years before the start of the games, the athletes' village was still not under construction and the aquatics and athletics stadiums fell way behind schedule. Some venues and the athletes village were finished only a few weeks before the start of the games, including the Telcel Athletics Stadium and the beach volleyball stadium in Puerto Vallarta. This meant that not all disciplines could have a test event before the games began. Organizers guaranteed that all the sports venues being built for the games would be ready before September 2011. Many of the venues were scaled down, including the Telmex athletics stadium, which had the number of seats halved. During the election of the host city of the 2015 Pan American Games, PASO president Mario Vázquez Rana said that if Guadalajara did not address the delays, Toronto, the host of the next games, would step in and replace Guadalajara as host. In August 2011, the athletics stadium was further delayed by constant rain which prevented the installation of the track. This development put the test event scheduled for September at risk of being cancelled. Several days before the opening ceremony, the organizing committee announced that they were optimistic that the venues would be ready by the start of the games.

=== Allegation of tainted meat ===
The German National Anti-Doping Agency warned athletes that some meat in Mexico had tested positive for the stimulant clenbuterol. However, Games officials said that food served at the athletes' village would be tested to ensure it contained no drugs or contaminants.

== See also ==
- 2011 Parapan American Games

Preceded by Rio de Janeiro	XVI Pan American Games; Guadalajara (2011)	Succeeded by Toronto
