= Brett Fraser =

Caymanian swimmer

Personal information
- Full name: Brett Michael Fraser
- National team: Cayman Islands
- Born: 28 August 1989 (age 37) George Town, Cayman Islands
- Height: 6 ft 2 in (188 cm)
- Weight: 185 lb (84 kg)

Sport
- Sport: Swimming
- Strokes: Freestyle
- Club: Stingray Swim Club
- College team: University of Florida
Medal record
Men's swimming
Representing Cayman Islands
Pan American Games
Gold medal – first place	2011 Guadalajara	200 m freestyle
Central American and Caribbean Games
Silver medal – second place	2010 Mayagüez	200 m freestyle
Silver medal – second place	2010 Mayagüez	200 m backstroke

Brett Michael Fraser (born 28 August 1989) is a Caymanian former competitive swimmer and real estate agent. Representing the Cayman Islands, he was a Pan American Games gold medalist. He represented the Cayman Islands at three Summer Olympic Games and won gold in the 200 m freestyle at the 2011 Pan American Games.

== Early and personal life ==
Fraser was born and raised in the Cayman Islands, and afterward, for his bachelor's degree studied finance and economics at the University of Florida. According to a 2016 interview with the New York Post, Fraser lives in the SoHo neighborhood of New York in Manhattan.

== Sports career ==
Fraser made his Olympic debut at the 2008 Summer Olympics in Beijing, where he competed in the men's 200 m backstroke, recording 2:01.17 in the heats. At the 2012 Summer Olympics, he competed in the 50 m, 100 m and 200 m freestyle events. He was a semi-finalist in the 100m and 200m freestyle, placing 14th and 12th overall, respectively.

At the 2014 Commonwealth Games, he competed in the 50 m butterfly and the 50 m freestyle. At the 2020 Summer Olympics in Tokyo, Fraser competed in the men's 50 m freestyle, finishing in 22.46 seconds.

Like his older brother, Fraser accepted an athletic scholarship to attend the University of Florida in Gainesville, Florida, United States, where he swam for coach Gregg Troy's Florida Gators swimming and diving team in National Collegiate Athletic Association (NCAA) and Southeastern Conference (SEC) competition from 2008 to 2011.

At the 2011 Pan American Games in Guadalajara, Mexico, Fraser won the gold medal in the men's 200-meter freestyle with a time of 1:47.18. He has also since then encouraged black people participating in swimming, decrying the lack of encouragement for people of color in swimming in the United States, and congratulating Simone Manuel and Lia Neal who swam for the United States at the Olympics and said that swimming had nothing to do with color. He was the flagbearer for the Cayman Islands at the 2012 Summer Olympics in London and the 2020 Summer Olympics in Tokyo.

As of 2023, he is the chief athletes officer of Enhanced Games.

== Real estate ==
Fraser has worked in global real estate advisory after his swimming career, working for ONE Sotheby's in Florida's east coast.

== See also ==
- Florida Gators
- List of University of Florida Olympians

Olympic Games
Preceded by Ronald Forbes	Flagbearer for Cayman Islands; Tokyo 2020 with Jillian Crooks	Succeeded by Jordan Crooks; Charlotte Webster
