= Cayman Islands Olympic Committee =

National Olympic Committee

- Country: Cayman Islands
- Code: CAY
- Created: 1973
- Recognized: 1976
- Continental Association: PASO
- President: Lorette Powell (acting)
- Secretary General: Carson Ebanks, MBE, JP
- Website: www.caymanolympic.org.ky

The Cayman Islands Olympic Committee was founded in 1973 and was recognised by the IOC (International Olympic Committee) in 1976. From the beginning as a fledgling association, undertaking but a few tasks, it has now developed to a body representative of 22 member-sports, with significant undertakings at home and abroad. It is also the body responsible for the representation of the Cayman Islands at the Commonwealth Games. Donald McLean, who competed at the 1996 Summer Olympics, became the committee's president in 2005.

== History ==
The plans to establish the Cayman Islands Olympic Committee started in 1972, it was founded the next year. In 1976, they received an invite to participate in the 1976 Summer Olympics in Montreal, Canada by the International Olympic Committee (IOC). The fellow British Overseas Territories of Bermuda and the British Virgin Islands also gained membership of the IOC. Despite a 1996 revision to the Olympic Charter that stated that membership could only be held by independent nations, the Cayman Islands retained their membership due to having been members before the amendment was made. In addition to administering the Cayman Islands Olympics teams, they also govern the teams representing the Cayman Islands at the Commonwealth Games.

The Cayman Islands Olympic Committee use the national song "Beloved Isle Cayman" as their gold medal anthem instead of the British national anthem "God Save the King". In 2018, they opened their first Olympic House.

== See also ==
- Cayman Islands at the Olympics
- Cayman Islands at the Commonwealth Games
- National Olympic Committee
