= Sport in Mexico =

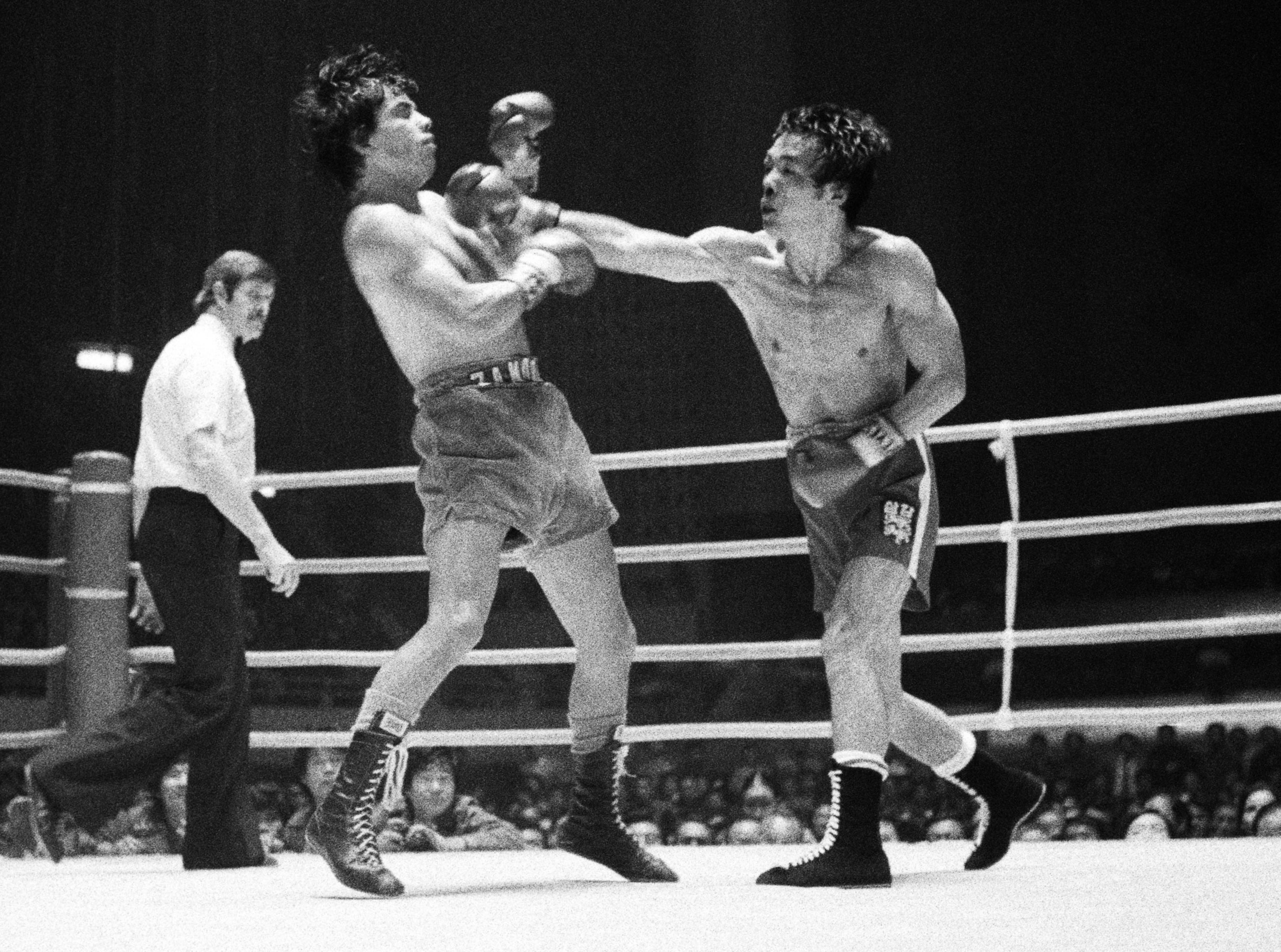
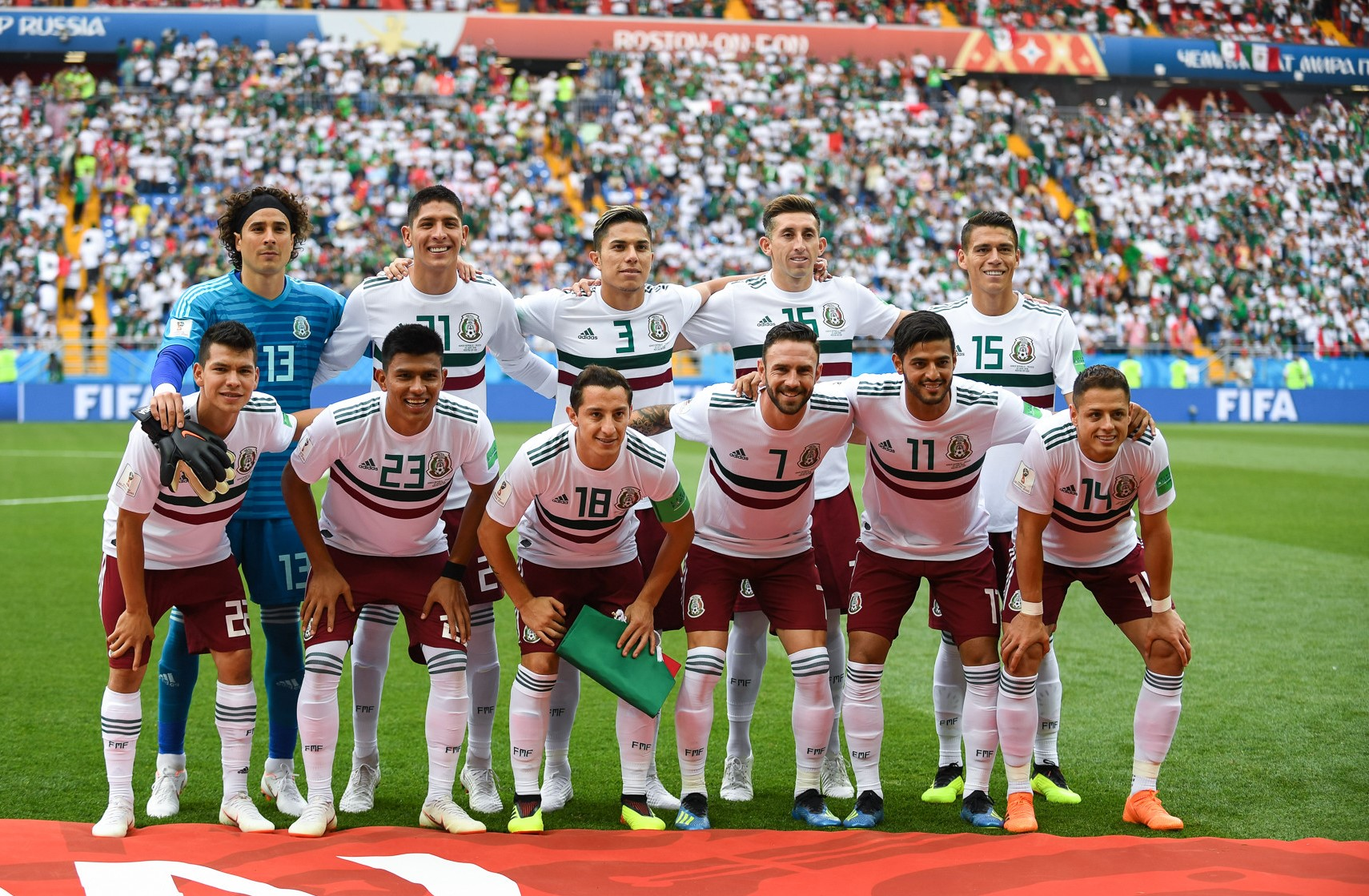
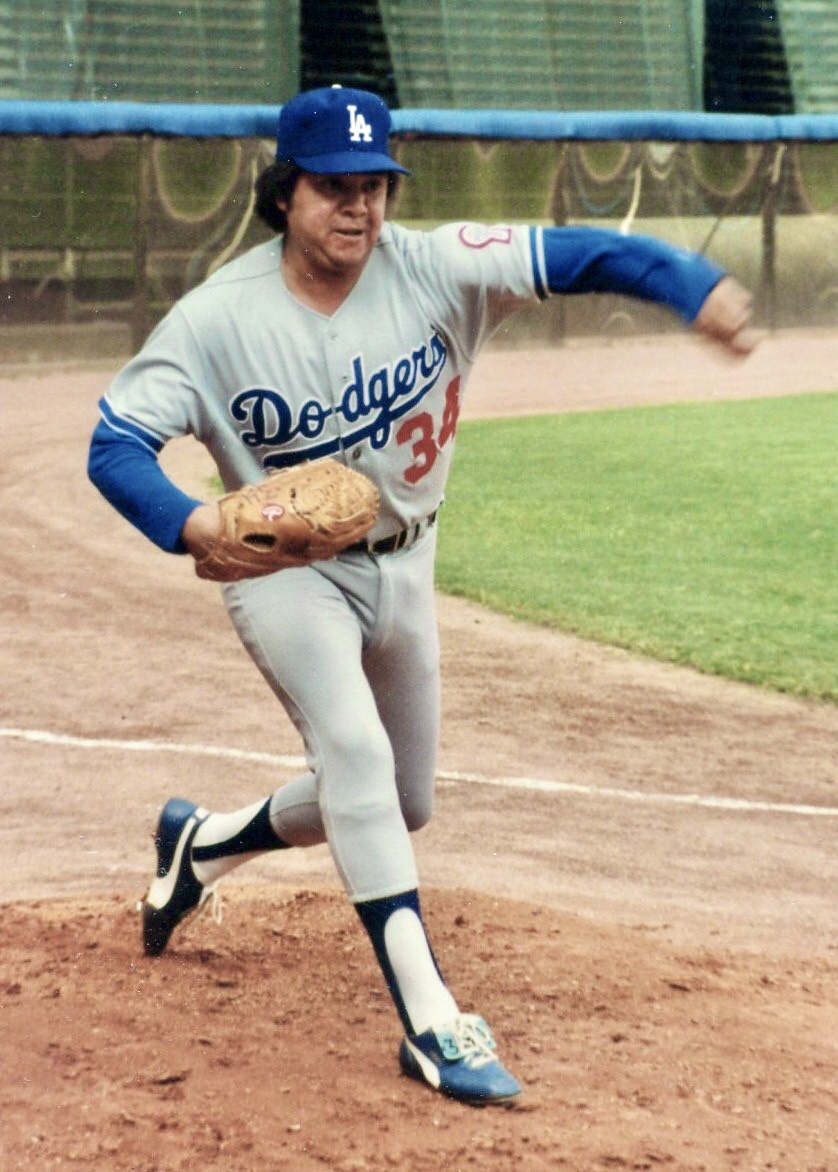
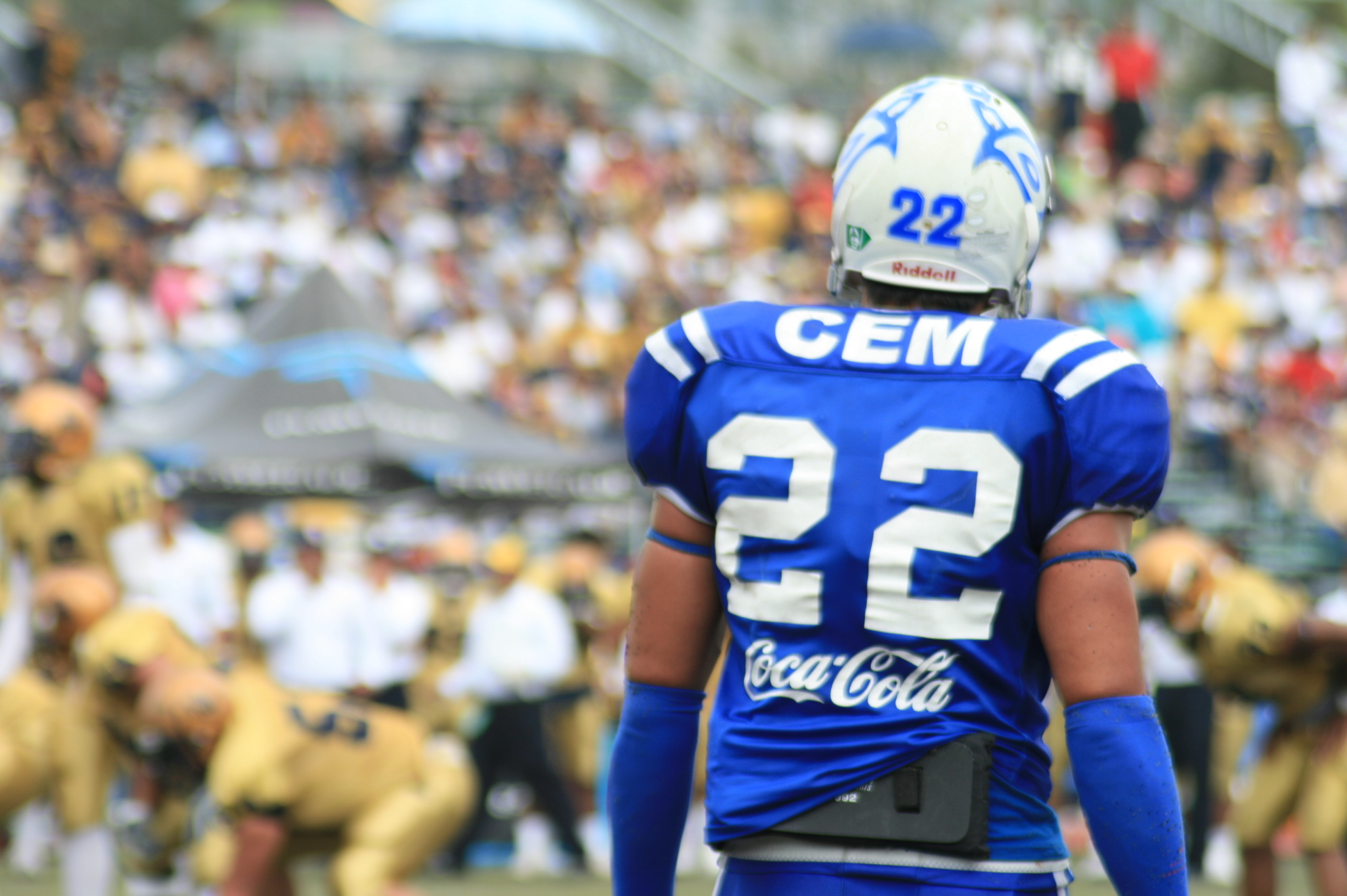
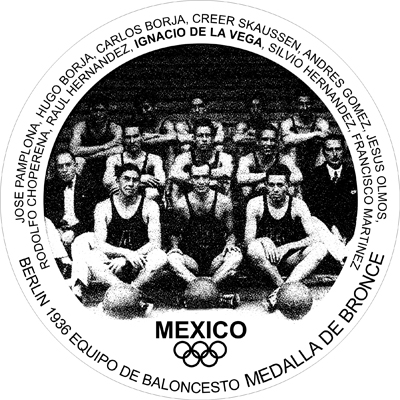
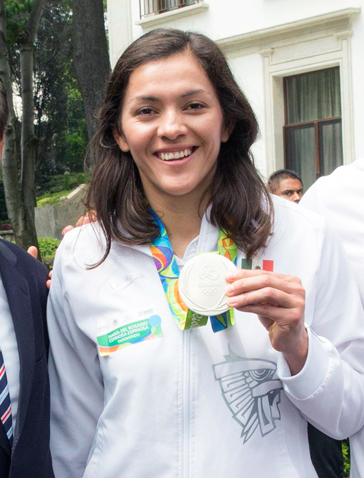
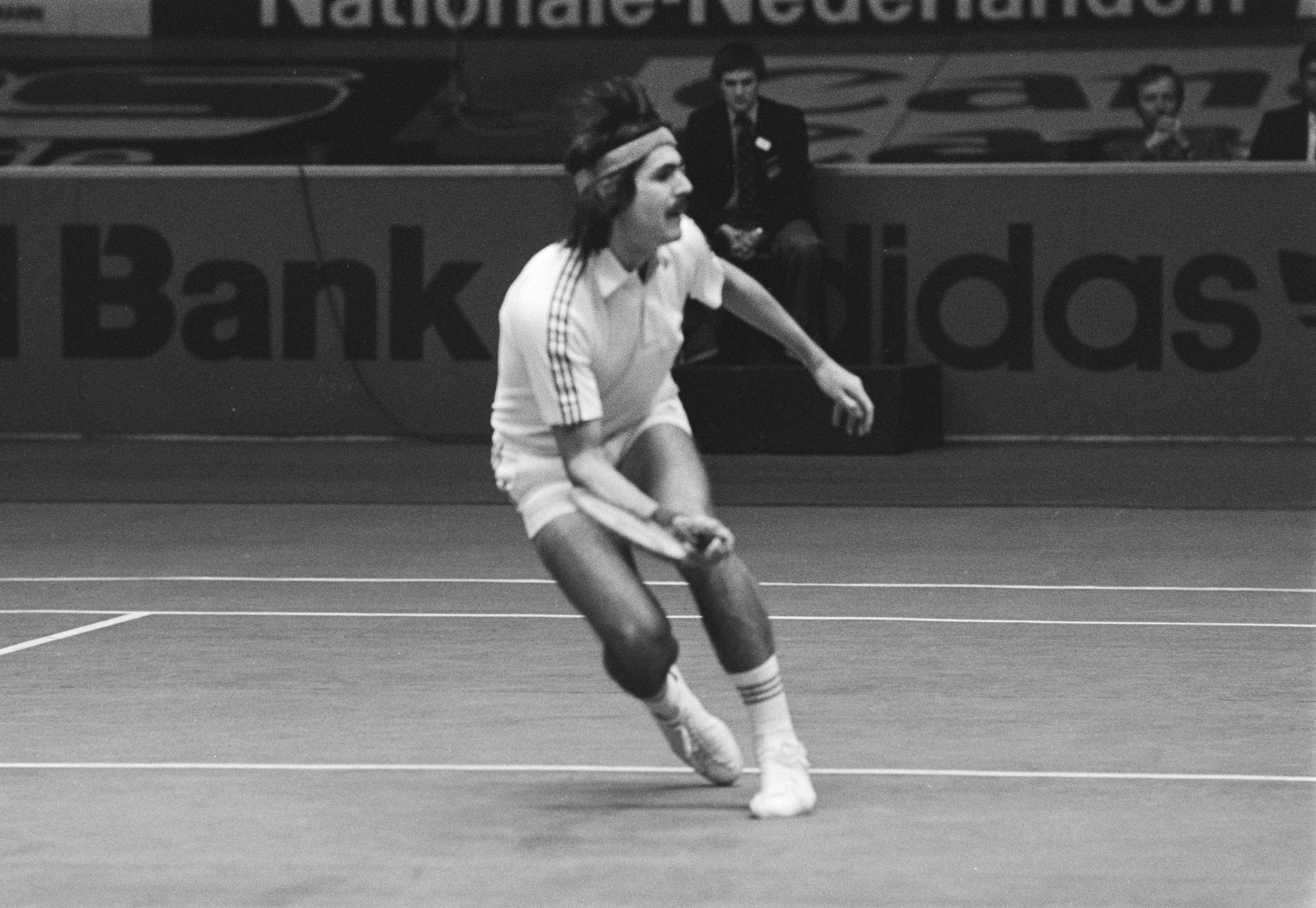
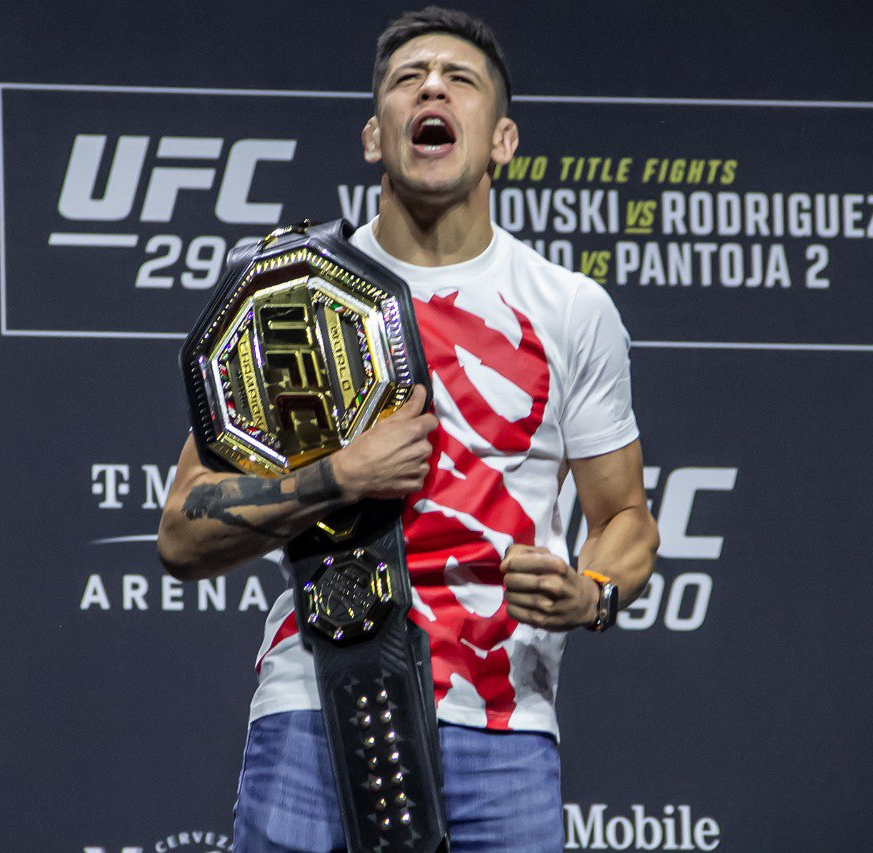
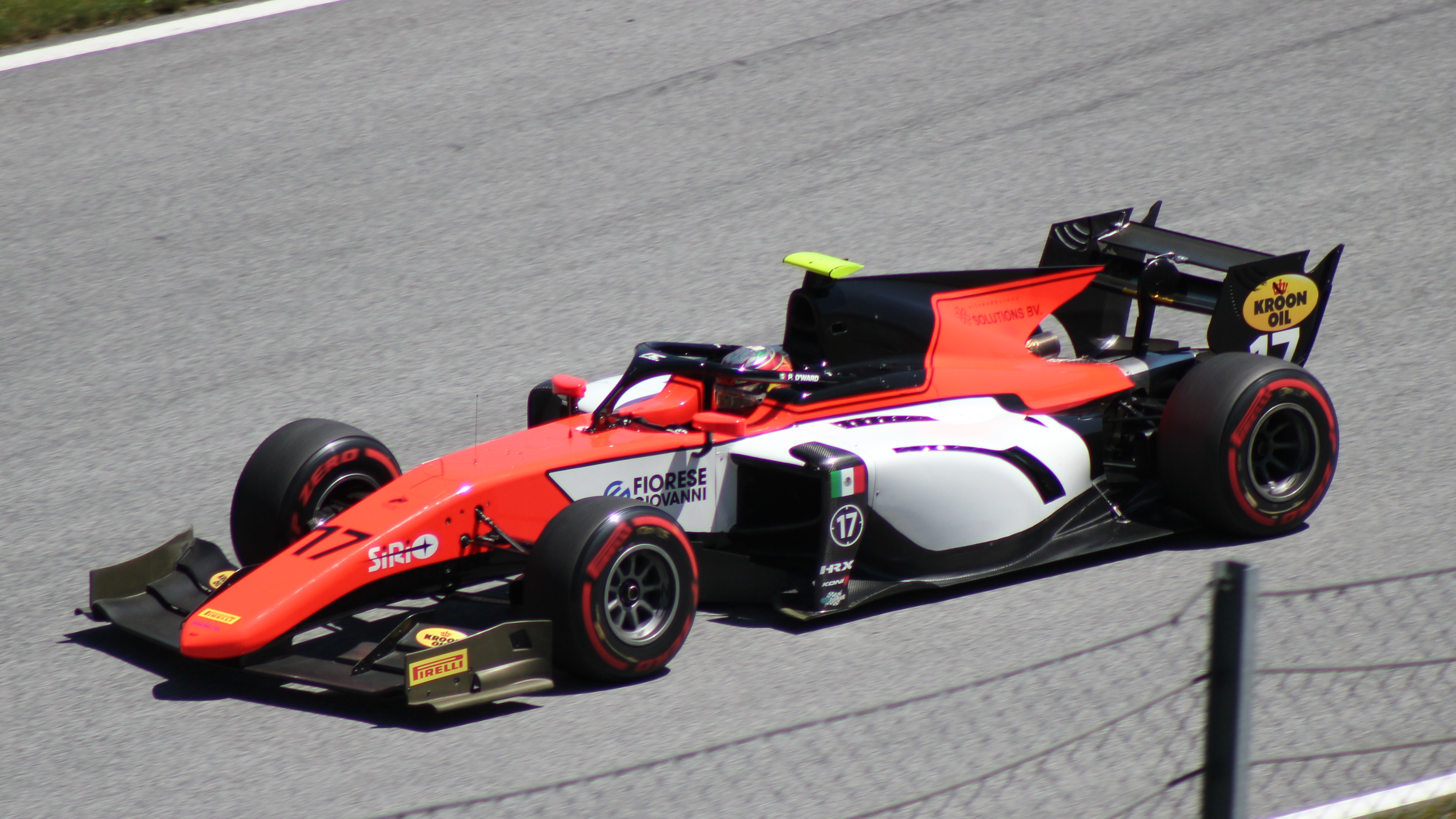
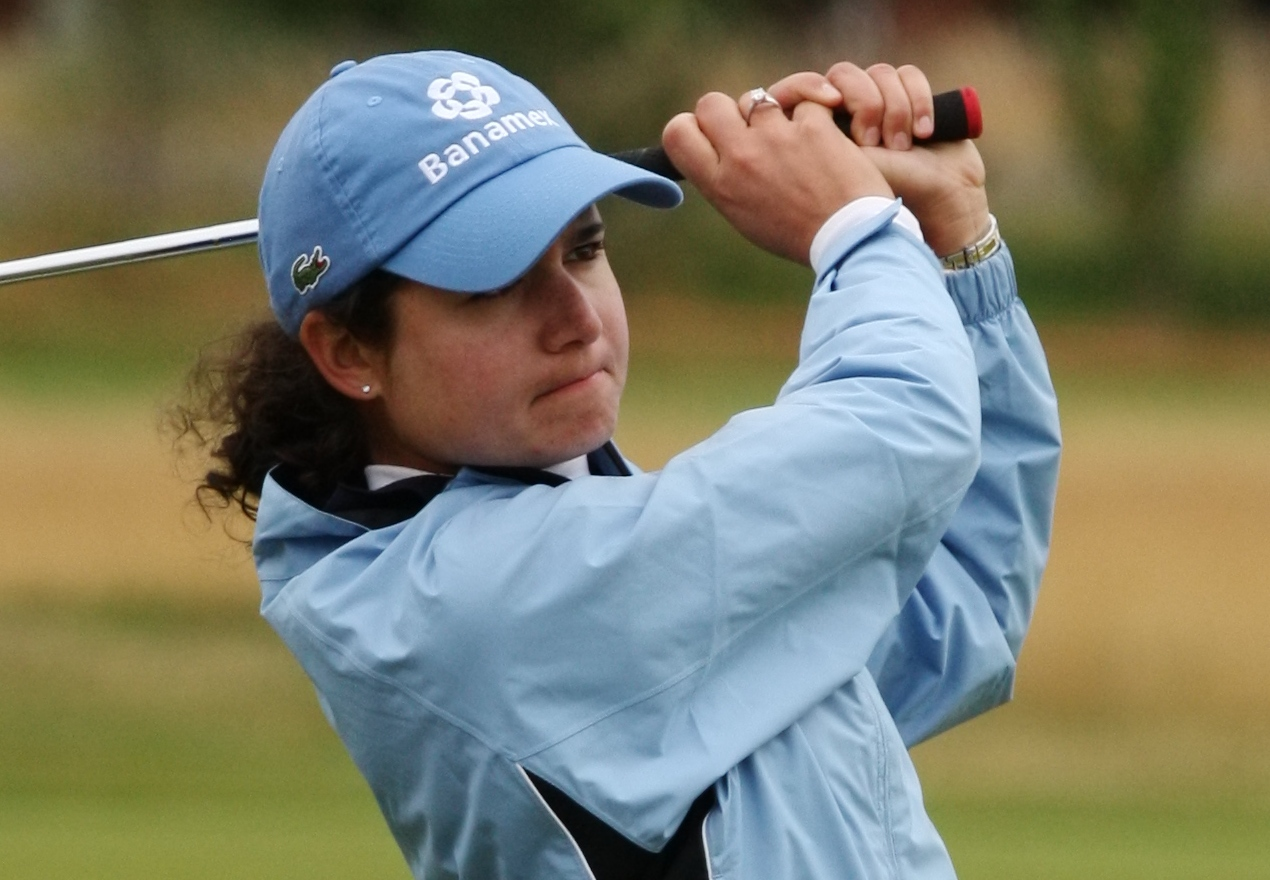
From top, left to right:Alfonso Zamora in a boxing match; the Mexico men's national football team; the baseball player Fernando Valenzuela; an American football player with the Borrejos Salvajes de Monterrey; the Mexico men's national basketball team at the 1936 Olympic Games; the taekwondo athlete María Espinoza with her silver medal; the tennis player Raúl Ramírez; the MMA fighter Brandon Moreno as UFC Flyweight Champion; Pato O'Ward driving in the Red Bull Ring; the golf player Lorena Ochoa.

The most popular sport in Mexico currently is association football (fútbol) followed by boxing. Historically, football has been the dominant sport in Mexico shaping the national sports scene. The Liga MX (Mexican Primera División) is one of the top football leagues globally. Baseball also holds a notable place in Mexican sports culture, particularly in the northwest and southeast regions of the country, particularly in states such as Sonora and Sinaloa, and in the southeast, notably in Yucatán and Quintana Roo. The Mexican Baseball League (Liga Mexicana de Béisbol) serves as a major league in this sport, with a strong regional following. The country has produced many renowned combat sport athletes (especially boxers), and major fights generate considerable interest and viewership.

In recent decades, American football, basketball, sport wrestling, auto racing, mixed martial arts (MMA), and cycling have also gained traction in Mexico. Basketball and American football have seen growing followings. Basketball has seen growing popularity in urban centers and northern regions, cities such as Monterrey and Guadalajara. American football tends to have a more localized following, particularly in the states of Nuevo León and Tamaulipas, where the sport is popular among college teams. Mixed martial arts is also popular in the northern regions, as they have produced the most Mexican MMA world champions.

Charrería (Mexican rodeo) holds cultural significance and is recognized as the national sport of Mexico. American rodeo is also practiced in Mexico, particularly in the country's northern-border states. It is held in high regard especially in Chihuahua and Coahuila. American bull riding is practiced in Mexico's northern and central regions, while jaripeo, a Mexican-born form of bull riding is traditionally practiced in the country's central and southern regions.

The country's prominence in global football is underscored by its hosting of the FIFA World Cup in 1970 and 1986, with Mexico set to co-host the 2026 FIFA World Cup with the United States and Canada. While college sports in Mexico do not enjoy the same level of commercialization, there is growing interest in university-level competitions. Internationally, Mexico has achieved notable success in various sports at the Olympic Games, including boxing, diving, and athletics. The country also excels in taekwondo, with Mexican athletes performing well in international competitions. As the markets for youth and junior players expand, the extreme racquet sport of racquetball is seeing steady growth and development. Meanwhile, in the southern part of Mexico City, the amateur practice of Paleta frontón and Basque pelota holds significant cultural importance and has enhanced the international reputation of Mexican sports.

In terms of exercising sports discipline, a distinction must be made between organized sport (high-competition and federated) and amateur sport (primarily individual and for physical culture purposes). In the first case, the second most practiced sport (after association football) at the national level is taekwondo, followed by basketball and baseball. In the second case, physical conditioning disciplines such as walking, running, swimming or those linked to gyms are the most practiced.

== History ==
=== Mesoamerican ball game ===
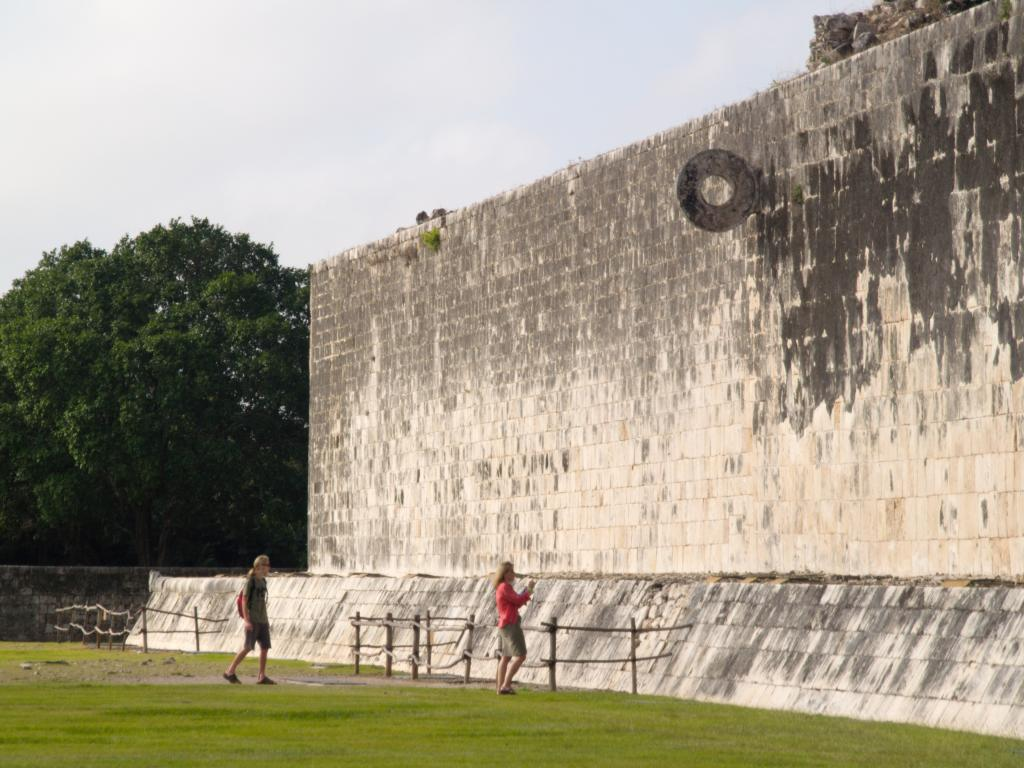
A stone ring located 9 m (30 ft) above the floor of the Great Ballcourt, Chichen Itza

The Pre-Columbian people of Mesoamerica have played the Mesoamerican ball game for over 3,000 years. Archaeologists found the oldest ballcourt yet discovered – dated to approximately 1400 BC – at Paso de la Amada in Mexico. The exact rules of the traditional ballgame remain unknown. Researchers believe that the sport probably resembled racquetball or volleyball, where the object is to keep the ball in play. In some regions in later periods, the losing team faced human sacrifice.

=== 18th century ===
By the 18th-century Spanish colonialists had introduced new sports such as horse racing and bullfighting, which quickly gained popularity among the elite and became significant social events. Additionally, activities like fencing and swordplay were adopted from European martial traditions, particularly among the upper classes. Cultural festivals often featured a variety of athletic competitions, blending local customs with colonial practices, and reflecting the rich, hybrid nature of Mexican society during this period.

=== 19th century ===
In the 19th century, British influences brought sports such as tennis and cricket to Mexico. By the end of the century, the growing American presence introduced baseball, with the sport taking root in Mexico City before growing in prominence throughout the rest of the country.

== International Games competitions ==
=== Olympic Games ===
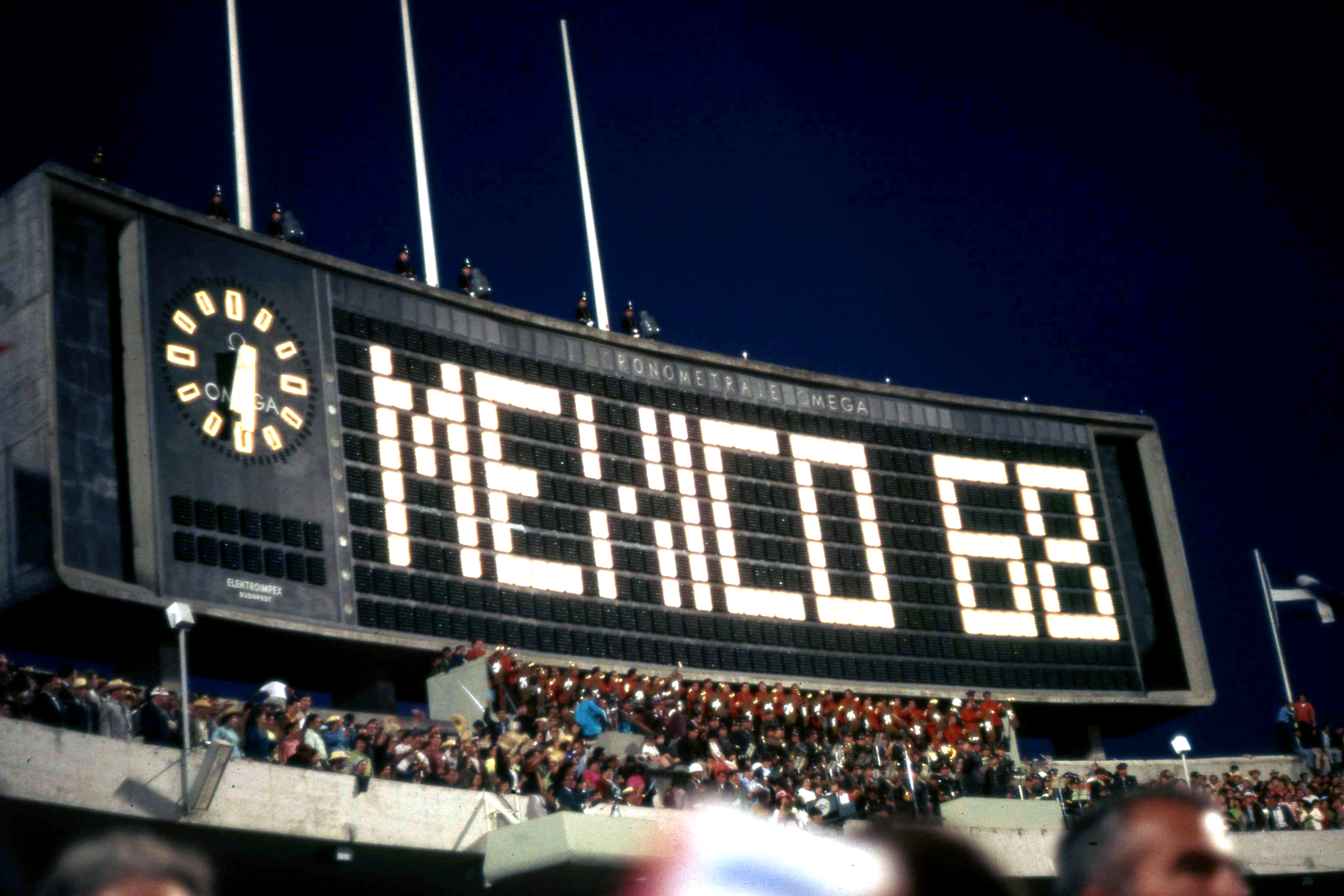
Opening of the 1968 Summer Olympics at the Estadio Olímpico Universitario in Mexico City

Mexico City hosted the 1968 Summer Olympics, the first time that the event was held in Latin America. Since then, the only edition of the Olympic Games held in the region was in 2016, in Rio de Janeiro, Brazil.

Mexico first participated at the Olympic Games in 1900 and has sent athletes to compete in every Summer Olympic Games since 1924. Mexico has also participated in several Winter Olympic Games since 1928. Mexico has performed best in athletics, boxing, equestrian, diving, and Swimming events, and more recently taekwondo and football.

Enriqueta Basilio made history by being the first woman to light the Olympic Cauldron at 19th Summer Olympics in Mexico City on 12 October 1968.

In diving, Mexico is the best Latin American representative with a long tradition of diving founded by Joaquín Capilla, a Mexican diver who won the largest number of Olympic medals among Mexican athletes. Many others who have excelled in World Championships and Olympics are Carlos Girón, Fernando Platas and Paola Espinosa who is the first Latina woman to become world champion. Soraya Jiménez became the first ever female athlete from Mexico to win an Olympic gold medal in 2000.

At the 2012 Summer Olympics, Mexico finished in thirty-ninth place; the Mexico team brought home seven medals, including their first gold medal won in football, and the rest of the medals in archery, diving, and taekwondo.

Donovan Carrillo is the first Mexican figure skater to compete at the Olympics in 30 years in 2022, and after scoring a personal best in the short program became the first ever Mexican skater to advance to the free skate.

=== Pan American Games ===
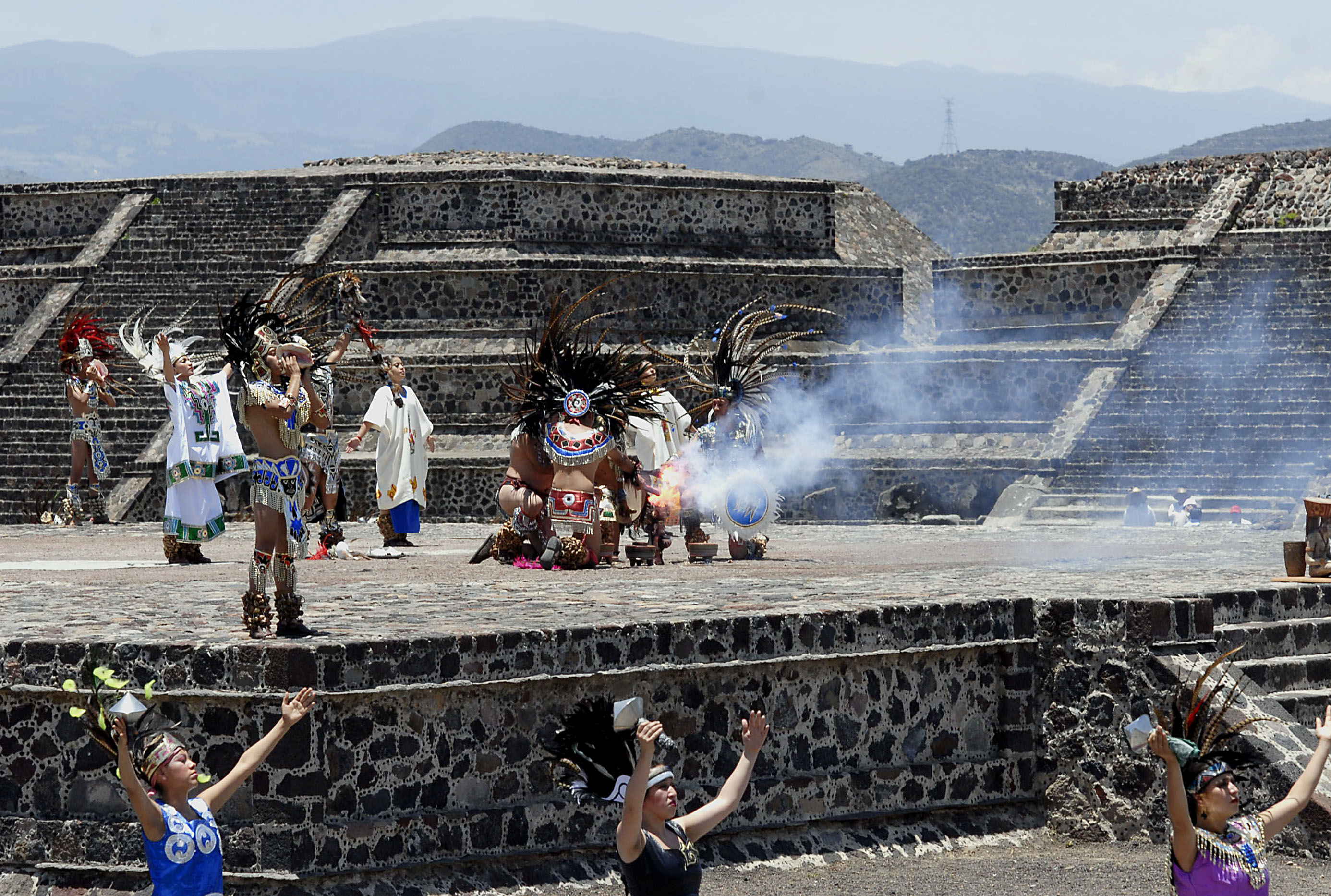
The Pan American Games torch being lit in Teotihuacan

The Pan American Games competition is held among athletes from nations of the Americas, every four years in the year before the Summer Olympic Games. Mexico ranks sixth in the top ten nations all time at the Pan American Games (minus medals won at the Winter Pan American Games). Mexico and Canada have hosted three Pan American Games each, more than any other nation. Among cities, only Winnipeg and Mexico City have played host to the Pan American Games more than once, each holding that honor twice.

Similar to the Olympic flame, the Pan American Games flame is lit well before the Games are to commence. The flame was lit for the first games in Olympia, Greece. For subsequent games, the torch has been lit by Aztec people in ancient temples, first in the Cerro de la Estrella and later at the Pyramid of the Sun at the Teotihuacan Pyramids. The only exception was for the São Paulo games in 1963, when the torch was lit in Brasília by the indigenous Guaraní people. An Aztec then lights the torch of the first relay bearer, thus initiating the Pan American Games torch relay that will carry the flame to the host city's main stadium, where it plays an important role in the opening ceremony. The 2011 Pan American Games were the third Pan American Games hosted by Mexico (the first country to do so) and the first held in the state of Jalisco in the city of Guadalajara.

=== Central American and Caribbean Games ===
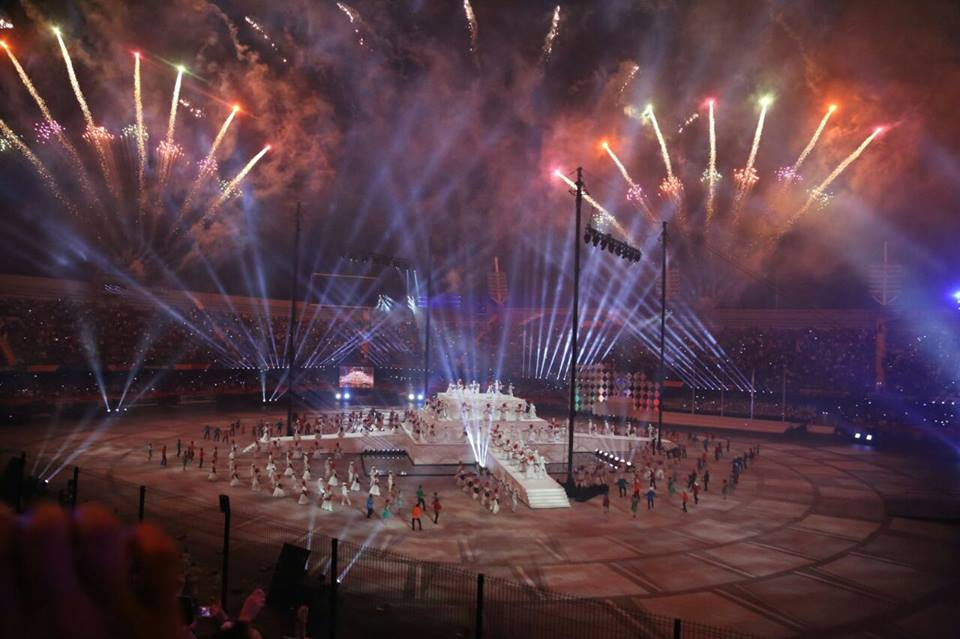
XXII Opening ceremony, the pyramid is representative of the archaeological zone of El Tajín Estadio Luis "Pirata" Fuente

The Central American and Caribbean Games is a multi-sport regional championship event, held quadrennially (once every four years), typically in the middle (even) year between Summer Olympics. The Games are for countries in Central America, the Caribbean, Mexico, and the South American Caribbean countries of Colombia, Guyana, Suriname, and Venezuela. They are designed to provide a step between sub-CACG-region Games held the first year following a Summer Olympics (e.g. Central American Games) and the Continental Championships, the Pan American Games, held the year before the Summer Olympics. The CACGs are the oldest continuing regional games in the world. As of 2014, Mexico has hosted the CACG games four times, three in Mexico City and one in Veracruz. Mexico is also one of the three countries present at the first games and the first organizer of the Games. Mexico is the only country that has attended all editions, without a single absence and has the most medals and second most gold medals as of 2019.

== Individual sports ==
=== Boxing ===
Mexican sport is also known for its boxing tradition. Boxing is the most popular individual sport in Mexico. Mexico is also the second in total number of world champions produced, after the United States, and has recently produced more World Champions in the last 30 years. The first boxing champion Mexico produced was Battling Shaw when he became the Light Welterweight Champion by outpointing Johnny Jadick in 1933. Fourteen Olympic boxing medals have been won by Mexico.

International Boxing Hall of Fame members include Julio César Chávez, Sr., Salvador Sánchez, Ricardo Lopez, José Nápoles, Rubén Olivares, Baby Arizmendi, Pipino Cuevas, Chiquita González, Sugar Ramos, Daniel Zaragoza, Miguel Canto, Vicente Saldivar, Carlos Palomino, and Carlos Zárate. Other prominent Mexican boxers include World Boxing Hall of Fame members, Kid Azteca, Jesús Pimentel, Lupe Pintor, Juan Zurita, Jorge Paez and José Luis Ramírez. More recent champions include Canelo Álvarez, Julio César Chávez Jr., Marco Antonio Barrera, Érik Morales, Juan Manuel Márquez, Rafael Márquez, Israel Vázquez and Juan Francisco Estrada.

Mexico's biggest rival in the sport of boxing is Puerto Rico. There have been many classic match ups between the two such as Salvador Sánchez–Wilfredo Gómez, Gómez–Carlos Zárate Serna and many more. Other great match ups are between two Mexican fighters and Mexican vs. Mexican-American. Good examples of fighting between two Mexicans are the Barrera vs. Morales trilogy and the Márquez–Vázquez rivalry. A good example of a Mexican vs a Mexican-American are Julio César Chávez vs. Oscar De La Hoya, Bobby Chacon vs. Rafael Limón, Chiquita González vs Carbajal, (particularly so Michael Carbajal vs. Humberto González) Márquez vs Díaz, and Castillo versus Corrales.

=== Taekwondo ===
Taekwondo was introduced to Mexico in 1969 by Korean Mexican Dai Won Moon. With over 1.5 million taekwondo practitioners and 3,500 schools throughout the country, taekwondo is one of the most popular sports in the nation. Mexico has also been competitive on the international level in the sport of taekwondo. Over forty Mexican taekwondo practitioners have medaled at the World Taekwondo Championships.

Taekwondo made its official debut at the 2000 Summer Olympics and Mexican athletes have medaled in the sport in every Olympics since then. Mexican athletes won a bronze medal in taekwondo at the 2000 Summer Olympics, a silver and bronze medal at the 2004 Summer Olympics, two gold medals at the 2008 Summer Olympics, a bronze medal at the 2012 Summer Olympics and a silver medal at the 2016 Summer Olympics. María Espinoza has medaled at the 2008, 2012 and 2016 Olympics. Mexico currently ranks fourth on the total medal count for taekwondo, its best performance for any Olympic sport. Jackie Galloway was an alternate for the Mexican team at the 2012 Olympics.

=== Mixed martial arts ===
Mixed martial arts has achieved popularity in the early 21st century. Many companies promote MMA cards, with the Ultimate Fighting Championship (UFC) the most dominant. Mexico is, along with Brazil, the only two Latin American countries to have world champions in the major MMA leagues, although the country retains the honor of being the first Spanish-speaking country to achieve such a feat.

Some prominent fighters include Yair "Pantera" Rodríguez, Brandon Moreno, Erik "Goyito" Pérez, José "Teco" Quiñónez, Manuel "Loco" Torres, Raul Rosas Jr., and Daniel Zellhuber. Like boxing, women's MMA emerged after the men's, with martial artists such as Alexa Grasso, Loopy Godínez, Irene Aldana, Yazmin Jauregui, and Jessica Aguilar.

In IMMAF, Mexico has won a total of 7 medals in the World Championships, five bronze and two silver. The two silver medals were won by Nora Ochoa Pérez in the 2019 Manama and 2023 Belgrade editions, marking the best result for a Mexican fighter in the competition.

=== Tennis ===
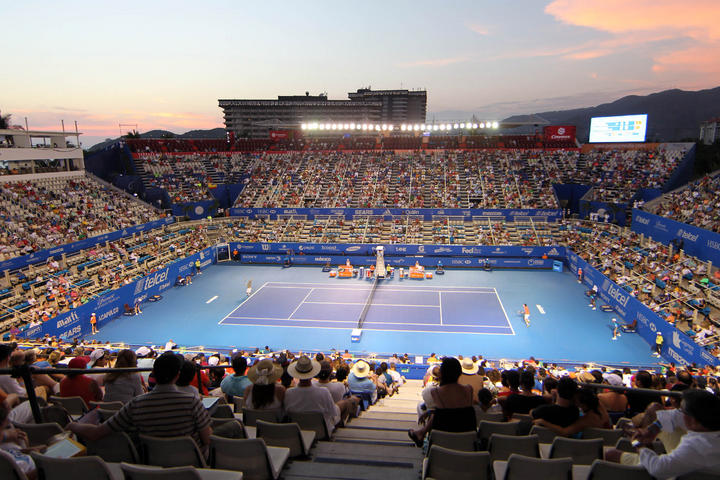
An open shot from the Acapulco Open, 2015.

The Abierto Mexicano Telcel is a tennis tournament held in Acapulco, Mexico. It is an event on both the ATP Tour (International Series Gold event) and the WTA Tour (Tier III).

Rafael Osuna is the best tennis player to come out of Mexico. He was ranked number one in 1963 when he won the U.S. Open Championship. Osuna led Mexico to the 1962 Davis Cup, becoming the first team from Latin America to compete for the trophy. Osuna would go on to win a Grandslam singles championship in 1963. He also won the U.S. Open Doubles Championship in 1962, the Wimbledon double's championship in 1960 and 1963, and a doubles tennis Olympic gold medal in 1968. Osuna was killed in a plane crash in 1969 at the age of 30. In 1969, the Intercollegiate Tennis College Association NCAA instituted "The Rafael Osuna Sportsmanship Award" in his honor. Later that year, the Chapultepec Club, renamed its stadium "Rafael Osuna Stadium". He was inducted into the International Tennis Hall of Fame in 1979.

Raúl Ramírez was the first player to finish first in both singles and doubles Grand Prix point standings, accomplishing the feat in 1976. Raúl Zurutuza is the director of Mextenis, which organizes Mexico's Acapulco and Los Cabos tennis tourneys. Plaza de Toros México become a tennis court and hosted, as Roger Federer faced Germany's Alexander Zverev on November 23, 2019. A record tennis crowd of more than 42,000 watched, the attendance figure smashed an almost decade-old record of 35,681, set in 2010.

=== Auto racing ===
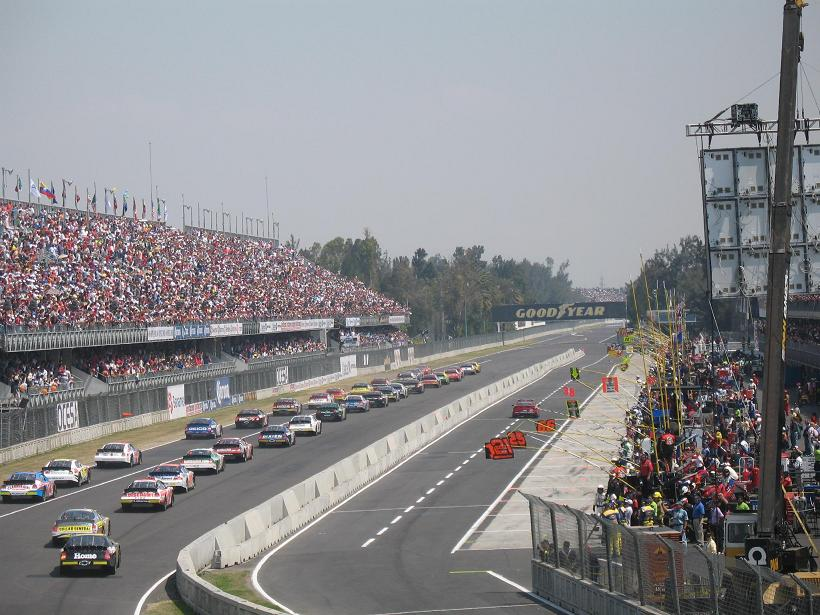
Autódromo Hermanos Rodríguez. A NASCAR race in the photo.

The most notable Mexican professional auto racers have been Pedro Rodríguez, who was the winner of the 1968 24 Hours of Le Mans, and his brother Ricardo Rodríguez, who at age 18 finished second at the 1960 24 Hours of Le Mans, becoming the youngest ever to stand on the podium. He was also the youngest F1 driver at that time. They were both considered among the top drivers before their untimely deaths.

The Mexico City racetrack Autódromo Hermanos Rodríguez ("Rodríguez Brothers Racetrack") was named in their honor. Autódromo Hermanos Rodríguez has hosted several racing events including the Formula 1 (1962–1970, 1986–1992, 2015–present), Champ Car World Series (1980–1981 and 2002–2007), World Sportscar Championship, Grand-Am, Trans-Am, IMSA, A1 Grand Prix, NASCAR Nationwide Series, Formula BMW World Finals, Champ Car Atlantic Series, Panam GP Series and NASCAR Mexico Corona Series.

More recently Sergio Pérez and Esteban Gutiérrez have re-established a Mexican presence in F1. Before them, Héctor Rebaque competed in the F1 between 1977 and 1981, their best position was tenth in the 1981 season, and Jo Ramírez worked for a number of F1 teams, most notably as team co-ordinator for McLaren in the 1980s and 1990s.

The A1 Team Mexico is the Mexican team of A1 Grand Prix, the World Cup of Motorsport; Salvador Durán has earned two victories for the team.

Adrián Fernández has become a popular driver in Mexico since the 1990s and reached his climax when he finished in second place during the 2000 CART season. Fernández co-founded the Fernández Racing with which he championed the American Le Mans Series and previously won in Champ Car, the IRL IndyCar Series, and Grand-Am. Memo Rojas and Luis Díaz have also been successful in formula racing and sports car racing.

Carlos Contreras was the first Mexican-born driver racing full-time in any NASCAR national series. Daniel Suárez won the 2016 NASCAR Xfinity Series championship. Daniel Suarez becomes first Mexican-Born driver to win in NASCAR Cup Series.

Since 2004, Rally Mexico is a round of the FIA World Rally Championship, held in the state of Guanajuato, and over time it has become one of the most popular rounds of the championship.

Other auto racing events currently held in Mexico include the Baja 1000, the World's most important off-road race, taking place on Mexico's Baja California Peninsula and with the Mexicans normally winning various categories. Racing events formerly held in Mexico include the Tecate/Telmex Grand Prix of Monterrey and the Carrera Panamericana, which is now held as one of the premiere vintage racing events of the World.

=== Golf ===
Golf is a popular sport in Mexico. There are over 150 golf courses in the country. Lorena Ochoa, who was the number-one-ranked female golf player in the world before abruptly retiring in 2010, has helped increase the popularity of golf in the country. On 10 November 2018, Gaby López won her first LPGA Tour event at the Blue Bay LPGA and was the flag bearer for Mexico at the opening 2020 Summer Olympics.

In the early days of Mexican golf, there were not many Mexicans playing golf at these Mexican golf clubs. The introduction of golf came from Anglo-American business owners. These individuals used their power, influence, and money to develop the land. This in turn made it possible for these clubs to be erected, such an extravagant oasis in the middle of these cities. For example, the Monterey Club had connections in North American smelting, refining and mining companies. Furthermore, the Oro golf Club in contrast was controlled by London-based executives who held positions in El Oro Mining and Railways. The explosion of capitalist society as well as the extreme wealth being accrued by many around the world paved the way for enormous changes in infrastructure. In the early days of golf in Mexico, the MGA was composed of immigrants only. This means that the Metropolitan Golf Association of Mexico had no individuals of Mexican descent.

Additionally, the modernity of golf was evidence of the vast possibilities that can be achieved by hard work. These new construction projects were palpable evidence that humans can sculpt the world around them into something new adding lakes, forests, and lush hills in the middle of an area that previously had a completely different complexion previous to this renovation. The Mexican Golf Association was originally started by Anglo-Americans although it is the Mexican Golf Association.

In Mexico, they still refer to it in English rather than in Spanish which reflects the members who belonged. These men were all interested in the inherent battle with nature, risk-taking, calculation, and resilience in the face of defeat. These characteristics were all seen as applicable to these individuals' daily lives.

Professional golf tournaments held in Mexico includes, the Corona Championship, MasterCard Classic, Lorena Ochoa Invitational, Mayakoba Golf Classic at Riviera Maya-Cancún, and the Mexican Open.

=== Track and field ===
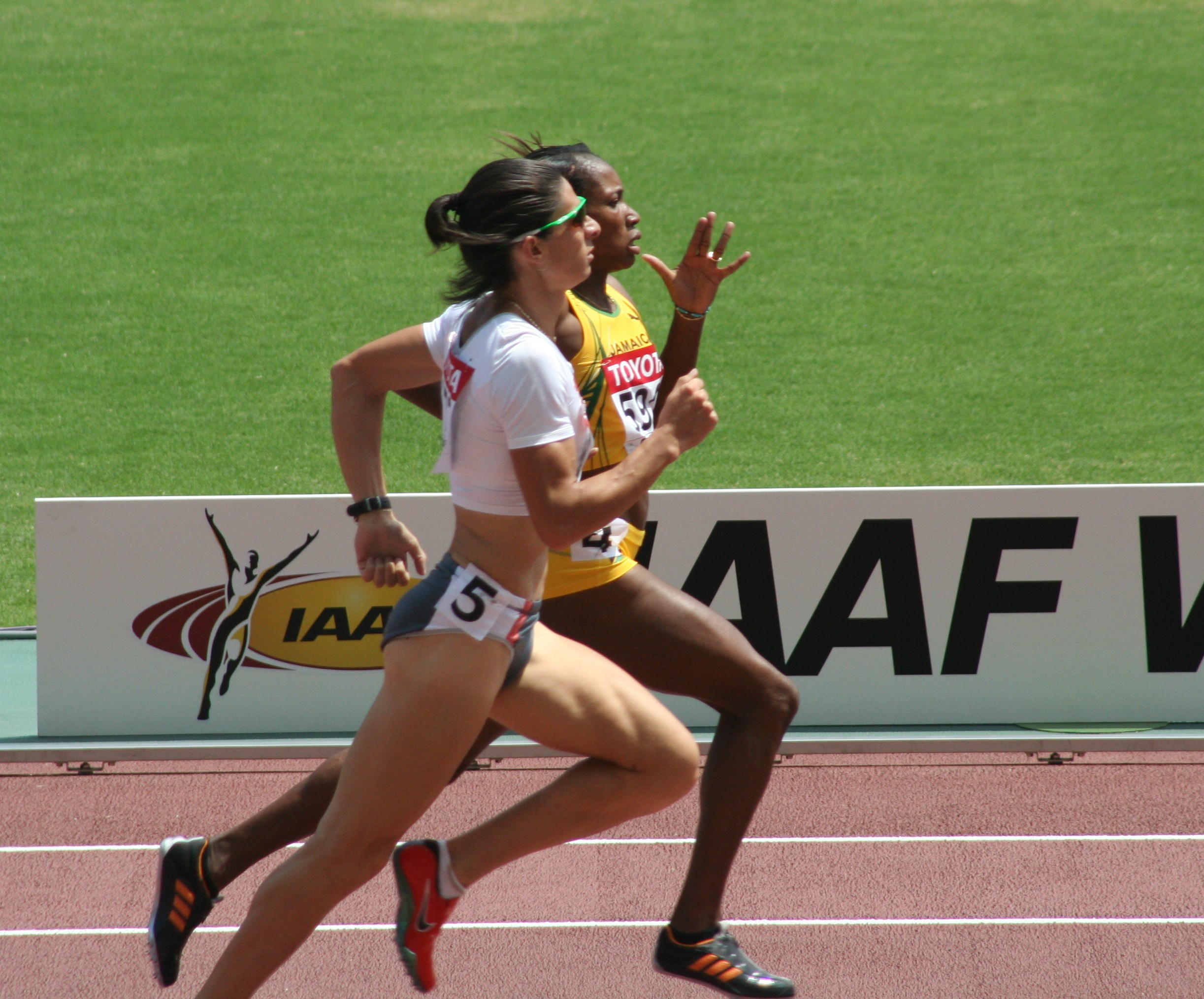
Ana Guevara

The 400-meter event became popular when Ana Guevara became world champion in 2003. Raúl González set the world record in the 50-kilometres racewalk twice in 1978 (3:45:52 and 3:41:20). As of October 2011, it was still the North American record.

María Lorena Ramírez Hernández, a Mexican long-distance and ultra-fund runner, became known worldwide after having won the 2017 UltraTrail Cerro Rojo ultra-distance race of 50 kilometers, in a time of 07:20:00, and for having done it wearing huaraches and a long skirt, without sports footwear or equipment. Her story was depicted in a documentary film, Lorena, Light-Footed Woman, for Netflix.

=== Skiing and figure skating ===
Rodolfo Dickson was the first Mexican alpine skier representing Mexico to win an international ski race, winning in Super-G in January 2015.

== Sports entertainment ==
=== Professional wrestling ===
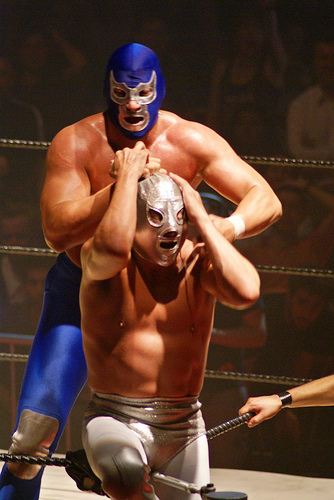
El Hijo del Santo vs. Blue Demon Jr.

Professional wrestling has been a popular form of sports entertainment in Mexico since 1933, when promoter Salvador Lutteroth founded Empresa Mexicana de Lucha Libre (EMLL). Unlike competitive sports, forms of sports entertainment, like professional wrestling, feature predetermined outcomes and choreographed performances, emphasizing entertainment value and storytelling. Throughout the 20th century, professional wrestling had established itself as one of the most popular sports in Mexico, so much so that it has played an important role in national popular culture. Currently, the two most prominent wrestling promotions in the country are Consejo Mundial de Lucha Libre (CMLL) and Lucha Libre AAA Worldwide (AAA).

Notable Mexican wrestlers include El Santo, Blue Demon, and Mil Máscaras, who are collectively known as the Tres Grandes ("Big Three") of the Mexican wrestling tradition. Other legendary figures in Mexican wrestling include Médico Asesino, Perro Aguayo, El Canek, Cavernario Galindo, El Solitario, Místico, La Parka, Tinieblas, Rayo de Jalisco, and Huracán Ramírez, among others.

The professional wrestling style that originated and gained popularity in Mexico is called lucha libre (translated as "freestyle wrestling"), distinguishing it from Japanese puroresu and traditional American professional wrestling styles. Lucha libre is characterized by its colorful wrestling masks, rapid sequences of holds and moves, and spectacular high-flying techniques—many of which have been adopted internationally.

Mexico is the Hispanic America country that has produced the most world champions in foreign wrestling promotions. In 2008, Blue Demon Jr. became the first Mexican wrestler to hold the NWA World Heavyweight Championship. In WWE, Mexican wrestler Alberto Del Rio held both the WWE Championship and the World Heavyweight Championship twice each. While wrestling in Impact Wrestling, Alberto also unified the GFW Global Championship with the Impact Wrestling World Heavyweight Championship. Mexico's Pentagón Jr. has also held the Impact championship. El Hijo de Dr. Wagner Jr., a member of the Mexican Wagner and Moreno wrestling families, held the GHC Heavyweight Championship in the Japanese promotion Pro Wrestling Noah. Mexican wrestlers Rush and Bandido have both held the World Championship in Ring of Honor. Thunder Rosa, a native of Tijuana, became the first Mexican woman to hold a world title in American wrestling promotions, having held the NWA World Women's Championship and the AEW Women's World Championship.

== Popular team sports ==
Most popular team sports in Mexico:

=== Association football ===
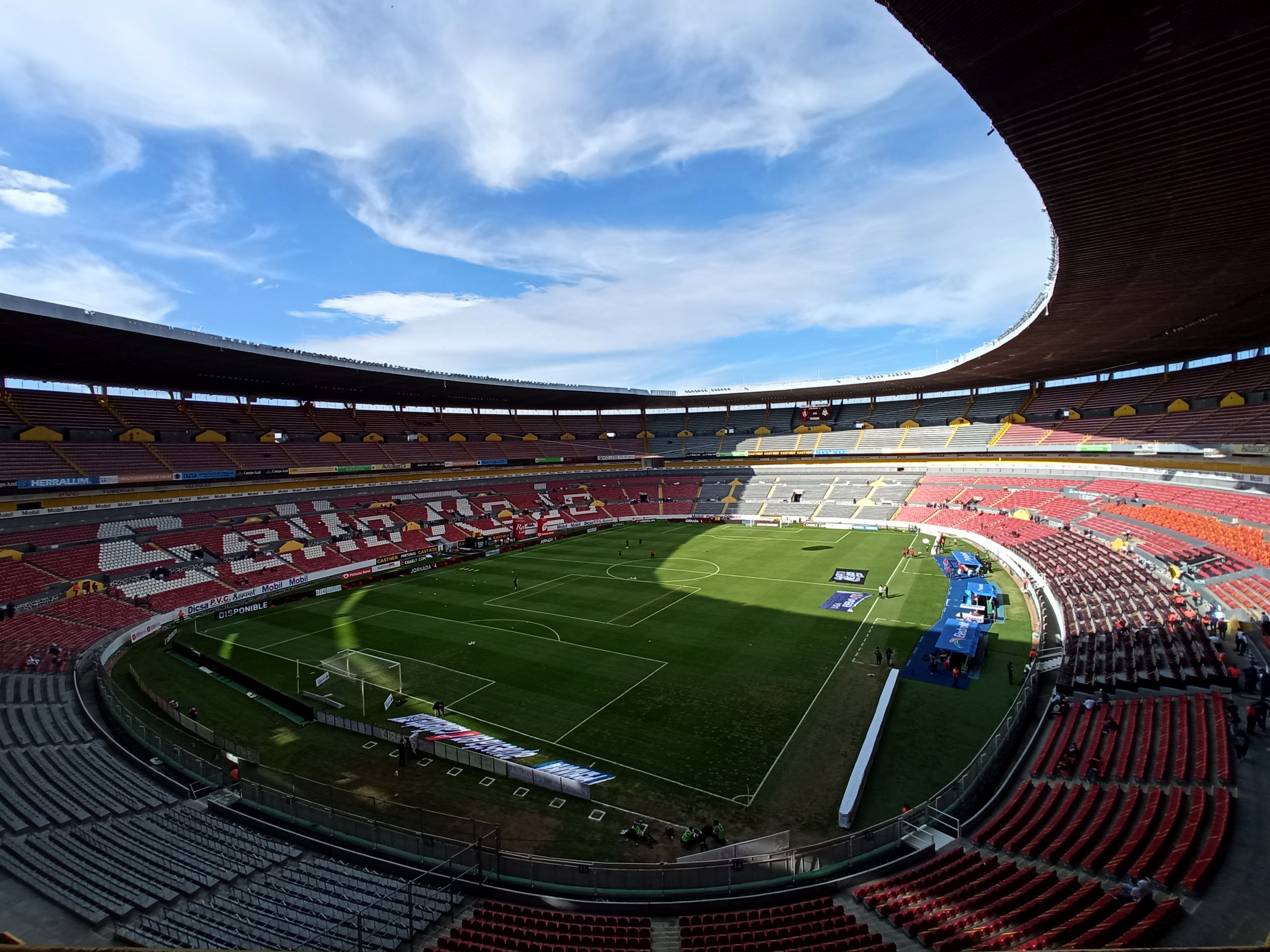
Estadio Jalisco in Guadalajara, Jalisco, Mexico, is one of the country's largest and most historic football stadiums, serving as a venue for club matches and international fixtures.

Mexico's most popular team sport is association football. Football is widely followed and practiced all over the country and it is considered the most popular sport in most states. It is believed that football was introduced in Mexico by English Cornish miners at the end of the 19th century. By 1902 a five-team league emerged with a strong English influence. Football became a professional sport in 1943. The main football clubs are América, Guadalajara, Cruz Azul and Pumas, known collectively as the Big Four.

Mexico has hosted three FIFA World Cup tournaments (1970, 1986 and 2026). Many of the stadiums in use in the league have a World Cup history. Sites such as Estadio Jalisco in Guadalajara, and Estadio Azteca in Mexico City are renowned for their national and international history. The legendary Estadio Azteca, for example, is one of the only two stadiums in the world to have hosted two men's World Cup finals (the other being the Maracana) and is one of the highest capacity stadiums in the world. Mexican's biggest stadiums are Estadio Azteca, Estadio Jalisco, Estadio BBVA Bancomer, Estadio Olímpico Universitario and Estadio Cuauhtémoc.

The 1986 FIFA World Cup in Mexico was broadcast to a global audience, and the wave or the Mexican wave was popularized worldwide after featuring during the tournament.

==== Men's national team ====
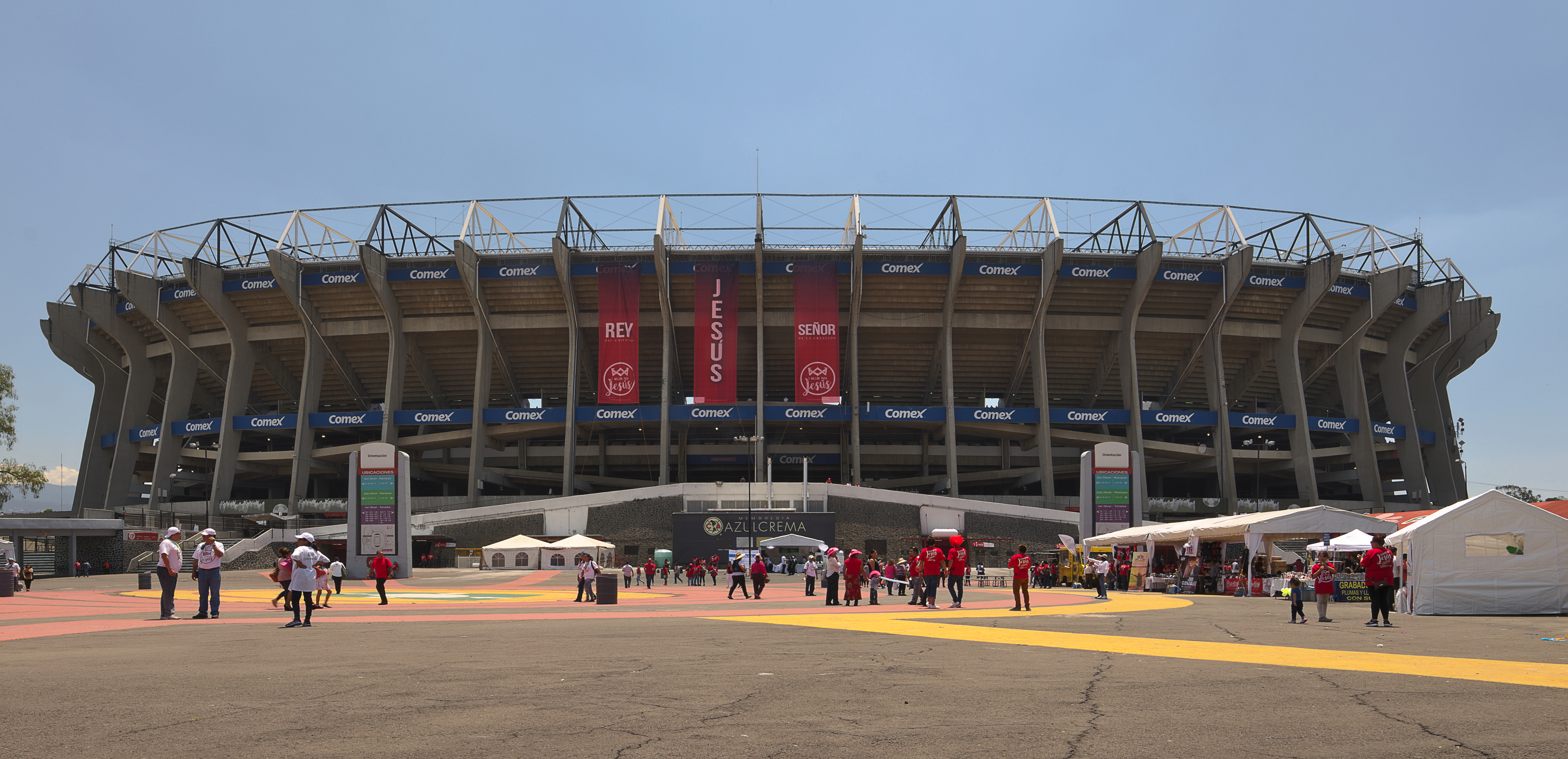
Azteca Stadium, Mexico City's iconic venue and one of the largest stadiums in the world, home to the Mexican men's national football team

The Mexico national football team (Spanish: Selección de fútbol de México) represents Mexico in association football and is governed by the Mexican Football Federation (FMF, from the native name of Federación Mexicana de Fútbol Asociación), the governing body for football in Mexico. Mexico's home stadium is the Estadio Azteca and their head coach is Jaime Lozano. The team is currently ranked 20th in the World Football Elo Ratings.

Mexico has qualified for seventeen FIFA World Cup tournaments and is among six countries to have qualified consecutively since 1994. Mexico played France at the first World Cup on 13 July 1930. Mexico's best progression was reaching the quarter-finals in the 1970 and 1986 World Cups, both of which were staged on Mexican soil, and will host once again in 2026 sharing with Canada and United States.

Mexico won the 1999 FIFA Confederations Cup and the gold medal at the London 2012 Olympics, finished twice as runners-up at the Copa América, won the 2005 FIFA U-17 World Championship, and have reached the quarter-finals twice at the World Cup. Recently, some players from Mexico have moved on to European clubs, including Rafael Márquez, Carlos Salcido, Ricardo Osorio, Pável Pardo, Andrés Guardado, Guillermo Franco, Carlos Vela, Giovani dos Santos, Omar Bravo, Aaron Galindo, Héctor Moreno, Francisco Javier Rodríguez and others.

Mexico is historically the most successful national team in the CONCACAF region, holding thirteen CONCACAF championships, including ten CONCACAF Gold Cups, one CONCACAF Nations League, one North American Nations Cup and three NAFC Championships. Mexico is the only team from CONCACAF to have won an official FIFA competition, the 1999 FIFA Confederations Cup. Although Mexico is under the jurisdiction of CONCACAF, the national football team has been regularly invited to compete in the Copa América since 1993 finishing as runner-up twice and obtaining the third place medal on three occasions.

==== Men's Professional leagues ====
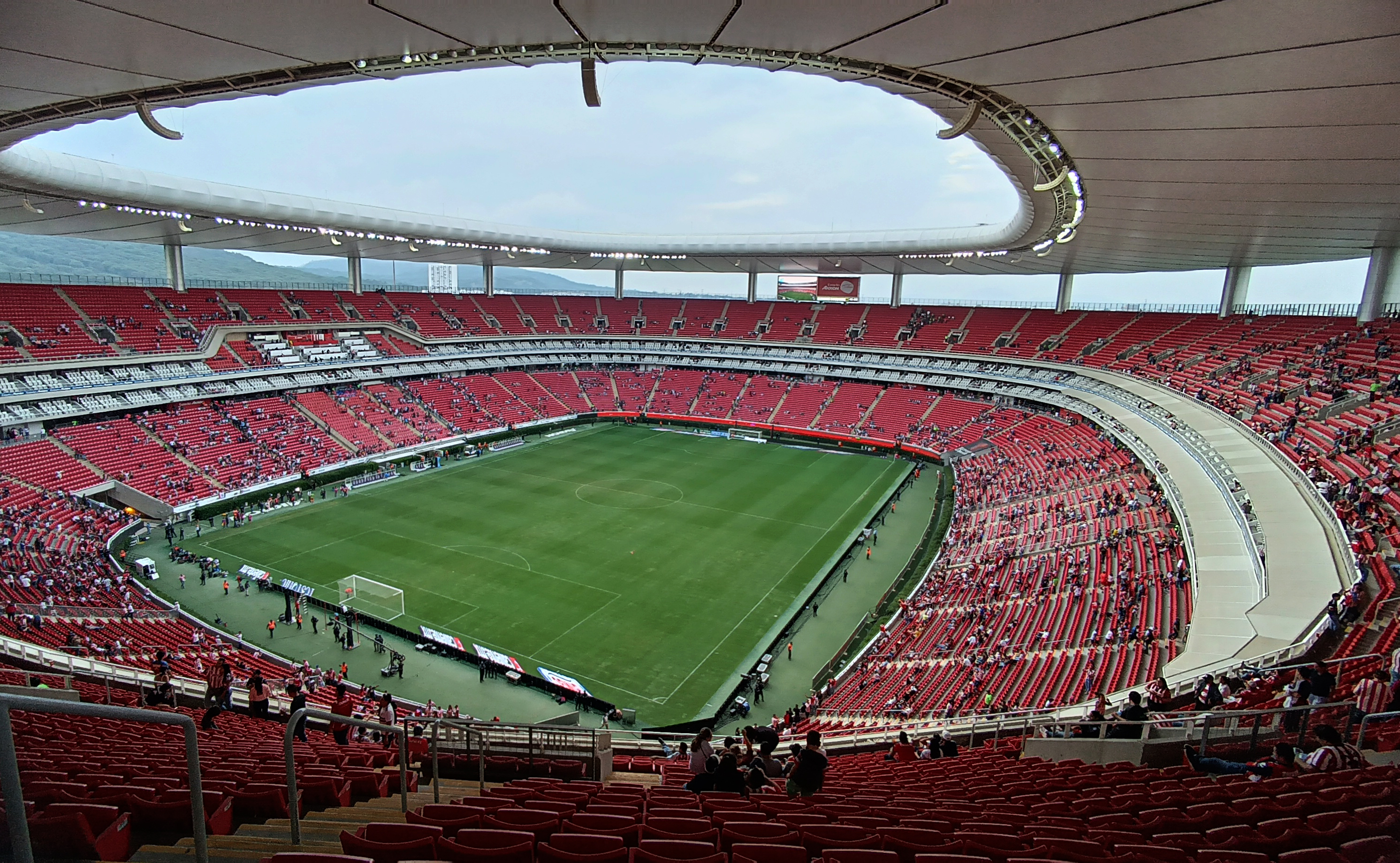
Estadio Akron, The stadium hosted its first major international event with the first leg of the 2010 Finals of the Copa Libertadores, and hosted the 2011 Pan American Games opening and closing ceremonies.

The first Mexican club, C.F. Pachuca, survives. Since 1996, the country has played two split seasons instead of a traditional long season. There are two separate playoff and league divisions. This system is common throughout Latin America. After many years of calling the regular seasons as "Verano" (Summer) and "Invierno" (Winter); the top-level Liga MX, formerly the Primera División, has changed the names of the competition, and has opted for a traditional name of "Apertura" (opening) and "Clausura" (closing) events. The Apertura division begins in the middle of Mexico's summer and ends before the official start of winter. The Clausura division begins during the New Year, and concludes in the spring season.

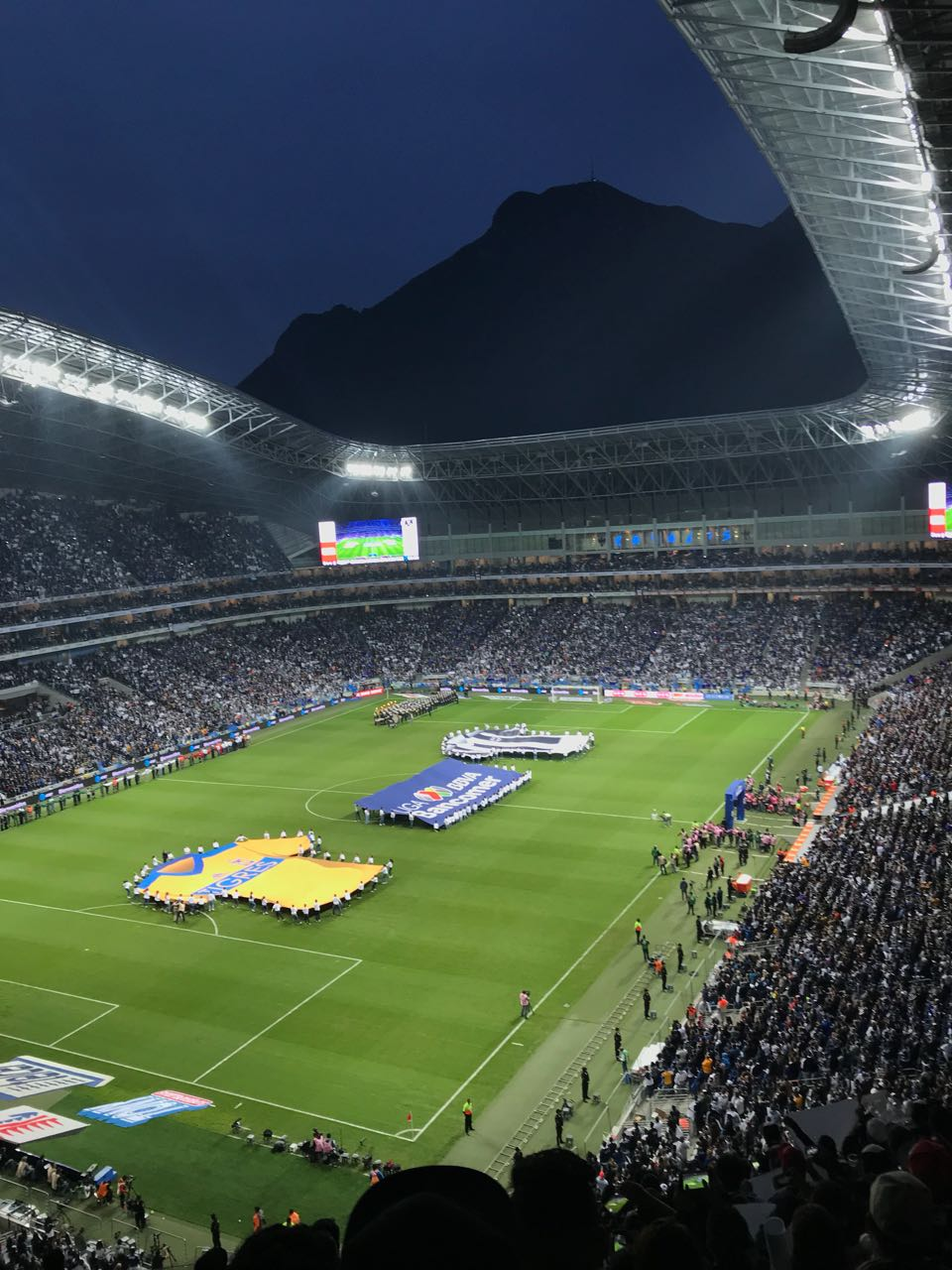
Inside Estadio BBVA during a Clásico Regiomontano derby game.

Mexican football is divided into four divisions, beginning with Liga MX and followed by Liga de Expansión MX, the Liga Premier, and Tercera División. The bottom two leagues translate literally as "Second Division" and "Third Division"; their names reflect their former positions in the league hierarchy before the Segunda División was split into two leagues, with the league now known as Ascenso MX becoming the new second level.

The teams are promoted and relegated by the FMF based on percentage calculations. Relegation is a common practice in Mexican football. There is a club exchange of each tier with the adjacent tiers so that a division's least successful team is relegated (transferred) to the next lower tier and the most successful club of the lower tier is promoted to the tier above. By the placement of each, the top tier cannot promote and the bottom tier cannot relegate.

The relegation system does not punish clubs for producing a single poor season. Mexican clubs are assessed on their previous five campaigns. Points are accumulated for five seasons, and are divided by the number of matches played. The club with the lowest percentage in the Apertura is relegated to a lower division. Each team must earn their promotions.

Since 1943, Mexico's five most successful clubs in Mexican football league system matches have been América (13 championships), Chivas (12), Toluca (10), Cruz Azul (8) and Pumas (7). America is the historical arch-nemesis of Chivas, so a match between the two is the Clásico Nacional derby that the entire country awaits. Another noted derby in Mexico is the Clásico Regiomontano between crosstown rival teams Monterrey and Tigres. Whereas the Clásico Nacional involves two teams from cities in different states the Clásico Regiomontano game involves two neighboring cities. Chivas are renowned for using only Mexican players in their squad. Consequently, they have long fed players to the Mexico national football team.

=== Women's football in Mexico ===
The Mexico women's national football team boasts one silver (1971) and one bronze (1970) in the Women's World Cup, though these accomplishments are not officially recognized, as they took place prior to FIFA's recognition of the women's game.

Mexico stopped allocating players to the NWSL management of the United States, having established its own women's league the Liga MX Femenil in 2017, and the numbers of allocated players and international players on each team vary each year due to trades. Maribel Domínguez was a noted captain and leading scorer of the Mexico women's national football team. She is known internationally as "Marigol" for her record of 46 goals scored in 49 matches for the Mexico women's national team.

==== Variants of association football ====
Beach football is a variant of the sport of association football which was invented in Brazil. It is played on beaches, and emphasizes skill, agility and goal scoring. The FIFA Beach Football World Cup has been held annually since 2005. Mexico finished as runners up to Brazil in its first appearance at the 2007 Beach Football World Cup.

Recently indoor association football has become a popular sport in Mexico, being included as part of the Universiada (University National Games) and the "CONADEIP" (Private School Tournament), which match University school teams from all over Mexico. In Mexico, "indoor" football fields are commonly built outdoors, and the sport is known as "fútbol rápido" (fast football).

The Mexican team Monterrey La Raza joined the Major Indoor football League in 2007 and finished the season in second place during its inaugural year. A previous version of Monterrey La Raza won three championships in the now defunct organizations Continental Indoor Soccer League and World Indoor Soccer League.

=== American football ===
American football (gridiron) has been played in Mexico since the early 1920s, and is a strong sport at Mexican colleges and universities, mainly in Monterrey. American football is the second most popular team sport in Mexico and the third most popular sport overall (behind only association football and boxing). The maximum competition is the Liga de Fútbol Americano Profesional (LFA). The Liga de Fútbol Americano Profesional was founded in 2016 with 4 initial teams (Raptors, Eagles, Condors and Mayas), all based in Mexico City. On February 21 it held the first game and the championship game was held on April 10, leaving the Mayas as champions and the Raptors as runners-up. The LFA has since expanded to eight members as of 2019. There are plans to expand the league and increase the number of teams and the number of participating states. Funded in 2018, the Fútbol Americano de México (FAM) is considered as a rival to the LFA given they compete for television spaces, players, coaches and in general for the same market segment. The team that became champion of the first season are the Pioneros de Querétaro (Pioneers of Querétaro).

Before this professional league was founded, the maximum competition of American football in Mexico was at the college level. American football has been played in Mexico since the early 1920s in different colleges and universities, mainly in Mexico City. In 1928 the first college championship was played, organized by Jorge Braniff. Over successive decades, more universities and colleges joined the championship, and four categories, called "Fuerzas", were created. The First Fuerza became the National League in 1970. In 1978, this was reorganized under the name "Organización Nacional Estudiantil de Fútbol Americano" (ONEFA). In 2010 a breakaway league, CONADEIP, was formed by the Monterrey Tech system, UDLAP and additional private universities.

The Aztec Bowl is an NCAA sanctioned college division post-season bowl in which American Division III college All-stars face off against a team of Mexican all-stars.

The Mexico national American football team has competed in the IFAF World Cup, which has been held every four years since 1999. Mexico participated in 1999 and 2003, finishing second in both competitions.

Raul Allegre is a former football placekicker in the National Football League (NFL); he played for the Baltimore Colts, the Indianapolis Colts, the New York Giants, and the New York Jets. Later eventually leading to his current work as color commentator for Monday Night Football with Álvaro Martín for ESPN in Latin America. He also appears on NFL32 and contributes to other ESPN programs. Isaac Alarcón was signed by the Dallas Cowboys in 2020 as a part of the league's International Player Pathway program.

Mexico's Estadio Azteca is also notable as being the venue of the NFL-game with the all-time record attendance of 103,467 on October 2, 2005. Mexico defeated the United States in the Women's gold-medal game at the Women's tournament in Flag football at the 2022 World Games. Flag football made its international debut at the World Games 2022.

=== Basketball ===
==== Men's basketball ====
Basketball is the third most popular team sport in Mexico. Mexico has a few professional basketball leagues, the top professional league is the Liga Nacional de Baloncesto Profesional where the Fuerza Regia de Monterrey are the most successful team of the league, having won the competition five times. The best teams of the LNBP advance to the FIBA Americas League. In the northwestern states is the CIBACOPA competition, with professional basketball players from Mexico and U.S. universities. This regional league have a stake in the rest months of the LNBP.

Manuel Raga is the first and only Mexican inducted in the FIBA Hall of Fame. In 1996 Horacio Llamas made history by becoming the first Mexican to participate in an NBA game. Since then, several Mexicans followed, including Eduardo Nájera, Earl Watson, Gustavo Ayón and Jorge Gutiérrez; also, Manuel Raga and Gustavo Ayón had notable triumphs in the European Basket, as the only Mexican champions in the EuroLeague.

The best results of the National team is the first place in the 2013 Americas Championship, for qualify to the 2014 Basketball World Cup, where it reached the playoffs, the team also won the bronze medal in Berlin 1936. The nation hosted the FIBA AmeriCup in 1989 and 2015.

Gimnasio Nuevo León Independiente one of the most modern multipurpose venue located in the city of Monterrey, Nuevo León, Mexico. It was inaugurated on October 7, 2013, and is home to Fuerza Regia de Monterrey.

In December 2019, commissioner Adam Silver of the National Basketball Association (NBA) announced Capitanes de la Ciudad de México, a Mexican professional basketball team based in Mexico City, were joining the NBA G League. The Capitanes join the NBA G League for the 2021–22 season, initial plan was starting from the 2020–21 season, the team would play in the G League for five seasons and be the first team outside the United States and Canada. Juan Toscano-Anderson became the 2nd Mexican American basketball player to win an NBA title when he won an NBA championship with the Warriors in 2022. Juan had played for the Fuerza Regia de Monterrey and the Soles de Mexicali.

==== Women's basketball ====
Blanca Burns became the first Mexican-born woman to referee an NBA game in 2021. She officiated her first NBA game in December. Before entering the NBA, she worked as a college basketball referee. Burns began her NBA refereeing career in 2021 at the San Antonio Spurs vs. Utah Jazz game. Previously, she worked as a referee in the NBA G-League. The first Mexican-born player to be drafted into the WNBA was Lou Lopez Sénéchal. She previously played for the Fairfield Stags and was named MAAC Player of the Year as a senior. She was selected 5th overall in the 2023 WNBA draft by the Dallas Wings.

Mexico has two main leagues to support women's basketball.

- LNBPF (Liga Nacional de Baloncesto Profesional Femenil): Founded in April 2022 out of the men's organisation the LNBP. In its inaugural season it had eight teams spread across two zones:

LNBPF initial clubs
Zone North	Zone South
Abejas de León Femenil	Fuerza Regia de Monterrey
Astros de Jalisco Femenil	Plateras de Fresnillo
Panteras de Aguascalientes Femenil	Halcones de Xalapa Femenil
Libertadores de Querétaro	Las Adelitas de Chihuahua

- LMBPF (Liga Mexicana de Baloncesto Profesional Femenil) was founded in 2014 out of a dispute within the LMPB surrounding a previous attempt to set up a women's league entitled the "Liga Nacional de Baloncesto Profesional Femenil". The league was formed with ten original teams who had been members of the 2014 version of the LNBPF: Mieleras de Guanajuato, Lobas de Aguascalientes, Mexcaltecas de Nayarit, Tapatias de Jalisco, Rieleras de Aguascalientes, Gamos de la Universidad Marista, Quetzales Sajoma, Nueceras from the State of Mexico, Leonas Cenhies and Bengalis. It operates, in 2022, with two conferences of seven teams each:

Conferencia Nacional	Conferencia Mexicana
Barreteras	Algodoneras
Escaramuzas	Atléticas
Mexcaltecas	Leñadoras
Mieleras	Lobas
Phoenix	Racers
Plebes	Regias
Quetzales	Temporacas

=== Baseball ===
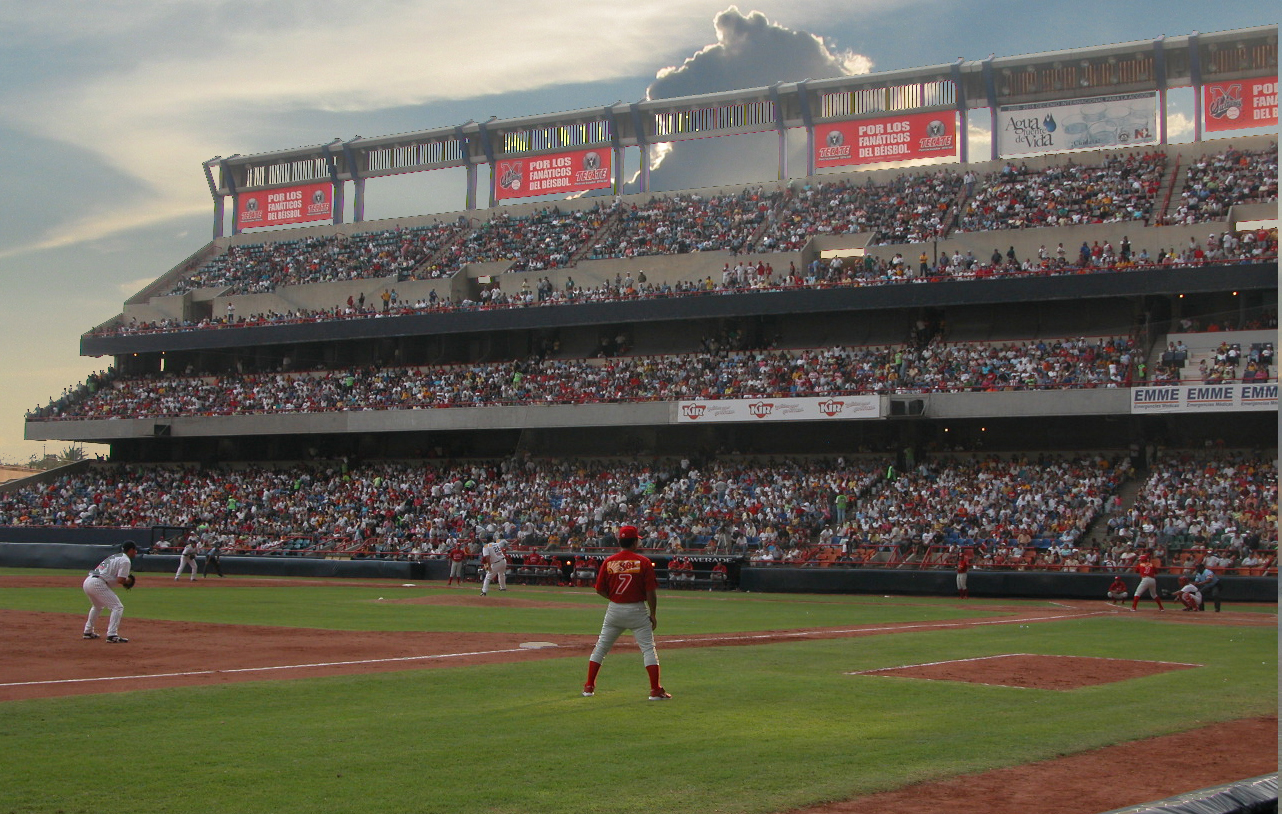
Estadio de Béisbol Monterrey is the largest baseball stadium in Mexico and the third largest in Latin America. It is the home field of the Sultanes Monterrey.

Baseball has been practiced throughout all Mexico across time. It has been traditionally known as the most popular sport in some regions of Mexico, mainly in Sonora and Sinaloa, and arguably in Campeche, Yucatán, Durango, Chihuahua, Nayarit and Tabasco, where it rivals football in popularity. Other states where baseball has had a strong traditional legacy include Baja California, Oaxaca, Coahuila, Veracruz, Puebla, Nuevo León, Tamaulipas, Quintana Roo and Mexico City. Baseball is currently the fourth most popular team sport in Mexico. Historically it was the third in popularity behind football and boxing, and Mexico has had relative success in the sport, probably just behind boxing and comparable to the success obtained in football.

Although there is some dispute about exactly when and where baseball started in Mexico, baseball has a long and colorful history in Mexico, particularly in the north, with historians placing its origin there as early as the 1840s. Today, baseball flourishes in Mexico, where it is played professionally in both summer and winter.

Over 100 Mexicans have played in the major leagues in the United States, including Cy Young Award winner Fernando Valenzuela, top 300 home run hitter Vinny Castilla, Gold Glove Award winner Aurelio Rodríguez, and AL batting champion Bobby Ávila. The first Mexican to play in Major League Baseball in the United States was Mel Almada, who participated with the Boston Red Sox in 1933. Most recently Benji Gil, Esteban Loaiza, Julio Urías, José Urquidy, and Cuban defector, now a Cuban-Mexican Randy Arozarena.

The Mexican Baseball League ("Liga Mexicana de Béisbol" or "LMB") was founded in 1925, establishing six teams, and playing all their matches in Mexico City. In the 1930s and 1940s, African-Americans from the United States – who were still barred from Major League Baseball until Jackie Robinson broke the color barrier in 1947 – played alongside Mexicans and Cubans in the Mexican League. In 1937, legendary Negro leagues' stars Satchel Paige and "Cool Papa Bell" left the Pittsburgh Crawfords to play in Latin America. After playing a year in Santo Domingo, Dominican Republic, Paige and Bell joined the Mexican League.

In the 1940s, multi-millionaire Jorge Pasquel attempted to turn the Mexican League into a first-rate rival to the major leagues in the United States. In 1946, Pasquel traveled north of the border to pursue the top players in the Negro and major leagues. Pasquel signed up close to twenty major leaguers, including such well known names as Mickey Owen and Sal Maglie, and a number of Negro league players. Ultimately, Pasquel's dream faded, as financial realities led to decreased salaries and his high-priced foreign stars returned home.

Currently, 16 teams divided into North and South Divisions play in the Mexican Baseball League in a summer season, which ends in a 7-game championship series between the winners of the two divisions. Since 1967, the league has been sanctioned as an AAA minor league, though no team has an affiliation with any team in the United States.

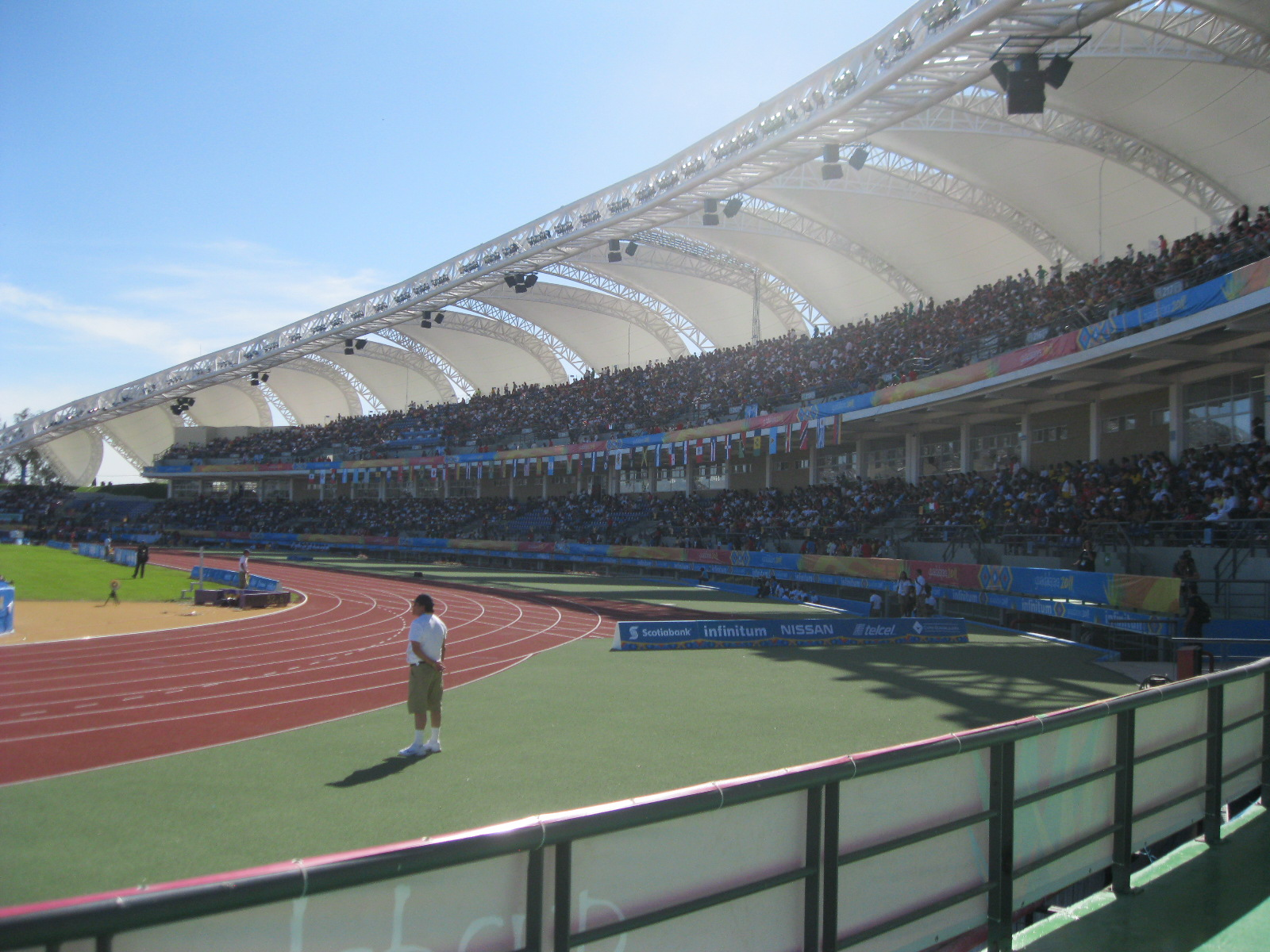
Estadio Panamericano de Béisbol used by the Mexican Baseball League team Mariachis de Guadalajara. The stadium hosted Pool D of the first round of the 2017 World Baseball Classic.

In the winter, 10 teams play in the Mexican Pacific League ("Liga Mexicana del Pacífico" or "LMP"), whose winner advances to the Caribbean Series against other Latin American champions. Although the Mexican League has a longer history, the Mexican Pacific League is the premier baseball league in Mexico today. It is played during the Major League Baseball (MLB) off-season, so many MLB players also compete in the LMP.

The Mexican Professional Baseball Hall of Fame has inducted 167 players, consisting of 138 Mexicans, 16 Cubans, 12 from the United States, and one Puerto Rican. Distinguished players include MLB stars Roy Campanella and Monte Irvin, who played in the Mexican League in the 1940s. Nicknamed "El Bambino Mexicano", or the Mexican Babe Ruth, Héctor Espino was inducted in the Mexican Hall of Fame in 1988, after playing with San Luis Potosí, and Tampico from 1962 to 1984. His 453 home runs remained the record until Nelson Barrera surpassed him in 2001. Espino still holds the all-time records in many offensive categories.

The Mexico national baseball team represents Mexico in international tournaments, most notably the World Baseball Classic. In the Bronze Medal Game of the Premier12 tournament in Tokyo, Mexico defeated USA, 3–2, in 10 innings to earn a spot in the 2020 Olympic Games. At the 2023 World Baseball Classic Mexico placed third in the tournament after losing to Japan.

The country's softball team, finished fourth with a 3–2 loss to Canada in the bronze-medal game at The Tokyo Olympics. The games were Mexico's first foray into Olympic softball.

== Other team sports ==
=== Rugby ===
Rugby in Mexico has a long tradition dating back to the early 1900s when Europeans were migrating to Mexico. Though rugby has been a minor sport in Mexico, the Mexican Rugby Federation was established, and the sport has been steadily increasing in popularity, with around twelve teams competing in the top league. The Mexican national rugby sevens team have achieved some good results in international tournaments, including taking third place at the 2015 NACRA Sevens.

=== Ice hockey ===
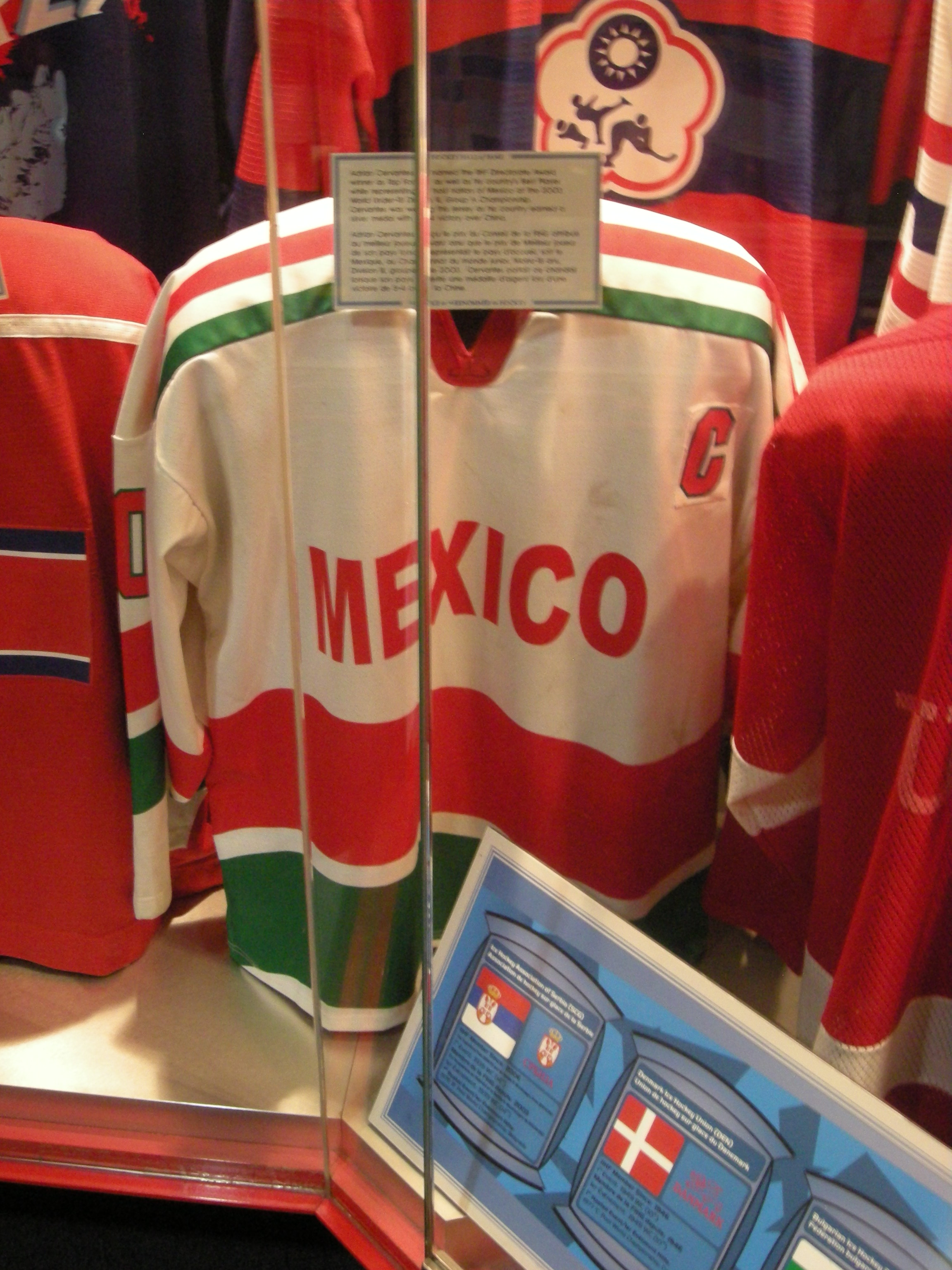
A Mexico men's national ice hockey team jersey at the Hockey Hall of Fame in Toronto, Canada.

Pelota purépecha (Spanish for "Purépecha ball"), called Uárukua Ch'anakua (literally "a game with sticks") in the Purépecha language, is an Indigenous Mexican sport similar to those in the Hockey family. Although not a mainstream sport in Mexico, ice hockey is played in larger cities like Monterrey, Guadalajara, Villahermosa, Culiacán, León, Cancun and Mexico City.

The Mexican Elite League is the top level of ice hockey in Mexico. The Mexican Elite League, was inaugurated on 2 October 2010 with the aim to establish Mexico as a high-level international competitor in ice hockey. Currently it has 4 professional teams and 17 associated equipment.

The "Federación Deportiva de Mexico de Hockey Sobre Hielo" (Mexico National Ice Hockey Federation) regulates all tournaments in Mexico. The Mexican hockey league includes 7 federation clubs and 8 independent clubs. Mexico is also the only Latin American full member of the International Ice Hockey Federation and competes in international tournaments. Claudia Téllez, at 32 became the first Mexican national to sign for the Canadian Women's Hockey League and Jorge Perez, became the first Mexican-born player at the Junior A level in Canada for Rayside-Balfour.

Although American born and trained, National Hockey League (NHL) center Auston Matthews is of Mexican heritage through his mother, and grew up in Scottsdale, Arizona. In the 2016 NHL entry draft Matthews was drafted first overall by the Toronto Maple Leafs, and began his NHL career by scoring four goals against the Ottawa Senators in his NHL debut, becoming the only rookie in modern history to achieve such a feat.

Guadalajara born Xavier A. Gutierrez serves as the CEO and President of the Arizona Coyotes, and is the first Latino team President & CEO in NHL history. Notable former NHL players of Mexican descent include former Montreal Canadiens forward Scott Gomez and retired San Jose Sharks winger Raffi Torres.

In 2017 the Mexican women's ice hockey team won a gold in Iceland, in their six-team division of the women's world championship. It was the first gold-medal win for Mexico at a full International Ice Hockey Federation (IIHF) world championship event. The team formed in 2012. The team's win this past week in Akureyri, Iceland, which left it in 27th place in the women's championships, earned it a promotion from Group B to Group A in Division II for next year.

=== Polo ===
Polo was first popularized by the Escandon-Barron family in the late nineteenth century. Three members of the Escandon-Barron family would win a bronze medal at the 1900 Olympics. The Mexican polo team also won an Olympic bronze medal in 1936, the last Olympic Games which featured polo.

Mexico hosted the World Polo Championship in 2008. The World Polo Championship has been held every three years by the Federation of International Polo since 1987. Mexico's best finishes have been second place in 1987, and third place in 1995 and 2008.

The best Mexican polo player is Carlos Gracida, who is also considered to be one of the best polo players in the sport. He has accumulated more tournament wins than any other athlete in the history of the sport, winning the Abierto Argentino de Palermo tournament five times, the British Open Gold Cup ten times, and the US Open nine times. Carlos' brother, Memo Gracida, is a polo player of international renown as well and a member of the Polo Hall of Fame. The two have teamed together to win numerous tournaments worldwide.

=== Basque pelota ===
Basque pelota is the name for a variety of court sports played with a ball using one's hand, a racket, a wooden bat, or a basket propulsor, against a wall. Since 1952, the International Federation of Basque Pelota has organized the World Championships of Basque pelota every four years. Mexico hosted the world championships in 1982, 1998 and 2006. Mexico gave its best performance at the 2006 games when they led all nations with six gold medals.

Frontenis is a variation of the Basque pelota game, itself a derivation of real tennis. It was created in 1916 in Mexico, when the idea of merging tennis and the traditional Basque pilota emerged. It is played in one of the largest courts in racquet sports with a tennis racquet that contains an optional custom double string called "doble encordado" and a tiny frontenis ball.

=== Racquetball ===
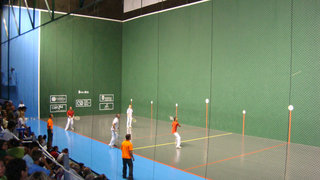
Players in a game of frontenis

Racquetball is a popular sport that is played in Mexico. The Racquetball World Championships were first held in 1981 and have been played every two years since 1984. San Luis Potosí hosted the championships in 1994 and 2000. Álvaro Beltrán was World Champion in 2000, and Mexican men have won the doubles titles four times: in 2000 (Luis Bustillos & Javier Moreno), 2002 (Polo Gutierrez & Gilberto Mejia), 2006 (Moreno & Beltran), and in 2012 (Moreno & Beltran). while the Mexican teams have finished among the top three in men's and top four in women's since 1986.

Paola Longoria was the No. 1 player on the Women's Professional Racquetball Organization tour at the end of its 2008–2009 season, becoming the first woman not from Canada or the US to do so. She also won gold at the 2009 and 2013 World Games, and again is the first non-American woman to do so. Additionally, in 2012, she became the first player to win both the singles and doubles Racquetball World Championship.

Racquetball will be included in the 2011 Pan American Games in Guadalajara.

=== Volleyball and Beach volleyball ===
The 1974 FIVB Women's World Championship was the seventh edition of the tournament, organised by the world's governing body, the FIVB. It was held from 13 to 27 October 1974 in Mexico. Mexico featured national teams in beach volleyball that competed at the 2018–2020 NORCECA Beach Volleyball Continental Cup in both the women's and the men's sections.

== Sports leagues in Mexico ==
=== Major sports leagues ===
The following table shows the professional sports leagues in Mexico and that have a national TV contract that pays rights fees.

League	Sport	Teams	National TV contract	Average Attendance	Total Annual Attendance	Ref
Liga MX	Association football	18	Claro, ESPN, Fox, Televisa, TV Azteca	21,548	8,325,487	
Mexican Baseball League (LMB)	Baseball	20	AYM Sports, Canal Once, Claro, ESPN, Fox, Imagen Televisión, Televisa, TV Azteca, TVC Deportes	5,525	5,137,817	
Mexican Pacific League (LMP)	Baseball	10	Fox, Megacable, TVC Deportes, YouTube TV	16,987	3,618,157	
Liga Nacional de Baloncesto Profesional (LNBP)	Basketball	14	AYM Sports, Canal 26, Canal 66, Capital 21, Hi Sports, Multimedios, Nación Deportes, TV4, TVC Deportes	4,688	1,200,000	
Liga Femenil	Association football	18	ESPN, Fox, Televisa, TV Azteca	2,067	1,027,673	
Liga de Expansión MX	Association football	16	AYM Sports, ESPN	3,410	989,182	
Liga Mexicana de Básquetbol CIBACOPA	Basketball	11	ESPN, Megacable, TVC Deportes	1,594	220,000	

=== Team sports leagues ===
- Circuito de Baloncesto del Pacífico (CIBAPAC)
- Kings League Mexico (KLM)
- Liga del Norte de Coahuila (LNC)
- Liga de Básquetbol Estatal de Chihuahua (LBE)
- Liga Estatal de Béisbol de Chihuahua (LEB)
- Liga de Fútbol Americano Profesional (LFA)
- Liga Invernal Mexicana (LIM)
- Liga Mayor de Béisbol de La Laguna (LMBL)
- Liga Meridana de Invierno (LMI)
- Liga Mexicana de Baloncesto Profesional Femenil (LMBPF)
- Liga MXA Independiente
- Liga Nacional de Baloncesto Profesional Femenil (LNBPF)
- Liga Norte de México (LNM)
- Liga Peninsular de Béisbol (LPB)
- Liga Premier de México
- Liga TDP
- Liga de Voleibol Profesional de México (LVP)
- Major Arena Soccer League 2 (M2, MASL2)
- Mexican Major Rugby League
- Mexican Roller Hockey National League
- Mexican Softball League (LMS)
- NBA G League (G League)
- National Student Organization of American football (ONEFA)
- National Student Sports Commission of Private Institutions (CONADEIP)
- Queens League Mexico (QLM)

=== Individual sports leagues ===
- Consejo Mundial de Lucha Libre
- Lucha Libre AAA Worldwide
- LUX Fight League
- Ultimate Warrior Challenge Mexico
- Budo Sento Championship
- Jasaji Fighting League
- World Boxing Council
- Federación Mexicana de Charrería (FMCH)
- Federación Mexicana de Rodeo (FMR)
- Cuernos Chuecos (CCH)
- NASCAR Mexico Series

=== Calendar of the major men's and women's professional sports leagues in Mexico ===
January	February	March	April	May	June	July	August	September	October	November	December
Liga MX (Soccer)						Liga MX (Soccer)					
Liga de Expansión MX (Soccer)						Liga de Expansión MX (Soccer)					
Liga MX Femenil (Soccer)						Liga MX Femenil (Soccer)					
			LMB (Baseball)								
LMP									LMP (Baseball)		
LMS (Softball)											
						LNBP (Basketball)					
	CIBACOPA (Basketball)										
		LNBPF (Basketball)									
			LFA (American football)								

==== Association Football and Baseball teams by City/Metro Area ====
Association Football and Baseball are the two most popular team sports in Mexico. Liga MX is the most important and highest level league (Football). Mexico has two Baseball leagues (winter and summer) which, historically, have been comparable to Triple-A in the U.S.; Liga Mexicana del Pacífico (winter) and Liga Mexicana de Beisbol (summer). Liga de Expansión MX (formerly Ascenso MX) is Mexico's second division in Football. The following table shows the teams of these leagues and the cities/metro areas they're based in.

Key to colors and symbols

Metro areas with 3 teams in league
Metro areas with 2 teams in league
Metro areas larger than 500,000 population without a team in these leagues

Region	Metro area	Population	Football Liga MX	Baseball LMP or LMB	Football (Div2) Expansión MX
Central South	Greater Mexico City	21,804,515	Club América Cruz Azul Pumas	Diablos Rojos (LMB)	Atlante F.C.
North East	Monterrey, Nuevo León	5,341,177	C.F. Monterrey Tigres UANL	Sultanes de Monterrey (both LMB and LMP)	Raya2
West	Guadalajara, Jalisco	5,268,642	Atlas F.C. C.D. Guadalajara	Charros de Jalisco (LMP) Mariachis de Guadalajara (LMB)	Leones Negros UdeG C.D. Tapatío
East	Puebla-Tlaxcala, Puebla/Tlaxcala	3,199,530	Club Puebla	Pericos de Puebla (LMB)	
Central South	Toluca, State of Mexico	2,353,924	C.D. Toluca		
North West	Tijuana, Baja California	2,157,853	Club Tijuana	Toros de Tijuana (LMB)	
North East	León, Guanajuato	1,924,771	Club León	Bravos de León (LMB)	
Central North	Querétaro, Querétaro	1,594,212	Querétaro F.C.		
North West	Juárez, Chihuahua	1,512,450	F.C. Juárez		
North West	La Laguna, Coahuila/Durango	1,434,283	Santos Laguna	Algodoneros (LMB)	
South East	Mérida, Yucatán	1,316,088		Leones de Yucatán (LMB)	Venados F.C.
Central North	San Luis Potosí, San Luis Potosí	1,271,366	Atlético San Luis		
Central North	Aguascalientes, Aguascalientes	1,140,916	Club Necaxa	Rieleros de Aguascalientes (LMB)	
North West	Mexicali, Baja California	1,049,792		Águilas de Mexicali (LMP)	
North East	Saltillo, Coahuila	1,031,779		Saraperos de Saltillo (LMB)	
Central South	Cuernavaca, Morelos	1,028,589			
North West	Culiacán, Sinaloa	1,003,530		Tomateros de Culiacán (LMP)	Dorados de Sinaloa
West	Morelia, Michoacán	988,704			Atlético Morelia
North West	Chihuahua, Chihuahua (state)	988,065			
East	Veracruz, Veracruz	939,046		El Águila de Veracruz (LMB)	
North West	Hermosillo, Sonora	936,263		Naranjeros de Hermosillo (LMP)	Cimarrones de Sonora
South East	Cancún, Quintana Roo	934,189		Tigres de Quintana Roo (LMB)	Cancún F.C.
East	Tampico, Tamaulipas/Veracruz	927,379			
South West	Acapulco, Guerrero	852,622			
South West	Tuxtla Gutiérrez, Chiapas	848,274			
North East	Reynosa, Tamaulipas	837,251			
South East	Villahermosa, Tabasco	833,907		Olmecas de Tabasco (LMB)	Pumas Tabasco
East	Xalapa, Veracruz	789,157			
Central North	Celaya, Guanajuato	767,104			Celaya F.C.
South West	Oaxaca, Oaxaca	713,925		Guerreros de Oaxaca (LMB)	Alebrijes de Oaxaca
North West	Durango, Durango	688,697		Generales de Durango (LMB)	Alacranes de Durango
East	Pachuca, Hidalgo	665,929	C.F. Pachuca		
Central North	Irapuato, Guanajuato	592,953			
East	Tlaxcala–Apizaco, Tlaxcala	570,308			Tlaxcala F.C.
North West	Ensenada, Baja California	561,375			
North East	Matamoros, Tamaulipas	541,979			
East	Poza Rica, Veracruz	521,530			
North West	Mazatlán, Sinaloa	501,441	Mazatlán F.C.	Venados de Mazatlán (LMP)	
North West	Ahome (Los Mochis), Sinaloa	459,310		Cañeros de Los Mochis (LMP)	
North West	Cajeme (Ciudad Obregón), Sonora	436,484		Yaquis de Obregón (LMP)	
North East	Nuevo Laredo, Tamaulipas	425,058		Tecolotes de los Dos Laredos (LMB)	
Central North	Zacatecas-Guadalupe, Zacatecas	405,285			Mineros de Zacatecas
North East	Monclova-Frontera, Coahuila	374,247		Acereros de Monclova (LMB)	
North East	Ciudad Victoria, Tamaulipas	349,688			Correcaminos UAT
South East	Campeche, Campeche	294,077		Piratas de Campeche (LMB)	
North West	La Paz, Baja California Sur	292,241			Club Atlético La Paz (2023)
North West	Guasave, Sinaloa	289,370		Algodoneros de Guasave (LMP)	
North West	Navojoa, Sonora	164,387		Mayos de Navojoa (LMP)	
West	Tepatitlán, Morelos	150,190			Tepatitlán F.C.

== International sporting events hosted by Mexico ==
=== Olympics ===
- 1968 Summer Olympics

=== Pan American Games ===
- 1955 Pan American Games
- 1975 Pan American Games
- 2011 Pan American Games

=== Central American and Caribbean Games ===
- 1926 Central American and Caribbean Games
- 1954 Central American and Caribbean Games
- 1990 Central American and Caribbean Games
- 2014 Central American and Caribbean Games

=== FIFA tournaments ===
- 1970 FIFA World Cup
- 1986 FIFA World Cup
- 1983 FIFA World Youth Championship
- 1999 FIFA Confederations Cup
- 2011 FIFA U-17 World Cup
- 2026 FIFA World Cup (co-hosted with Canada and United States)
- 2031 FIFA Women's World Cup (co-hosted with the United States)

=== Volleyball ===
- 1974 FIVB Men's Volleyball World Championship
- 1974 FIVB Women's Volleyball World Championship

=== Other Major International Events ===
- 1969 World Judo Championships
- 1979 Summer Universiade
- 1993 CONCACAF Gold Cup
- 2003 CONCACAF Gold Cup
- 2007–08 FIBA Americas League
- 2008–09 FIBA Americas League
- 2007 World Chess Championship
- 2008 World Polo Championship
- 2009 World Baseball Classic (Pool B)
- 2013 World Taekwondo Championships
- 2014 World Cup Taekwondo Team Championships
- 2015 World Cup Taekwondo Team Championships

== Motorsport ==
Sergio "Checo" Pérez finished as Formula One world runner-up in the 2023 season, becoming the first Mexican driver to achieve that result. Pérez finished 2023 with 285 points, compared with 305 points in 2022. His podium total also fell from eleven in 2022 to nine in 2023, although he took two pole positions in 2023 compared with one in 2022. Pérez won the 2023 Saudi Arabian Grand Prix from pole position, while his Red Bull teammate and reigning world champion Max Verstappen recovered from 15th place to finish second after a driveshaft problem in qualifying.

== See also ==
- People:
  - Prince Hubertus of Hohenlohe-Langenburg
  - Gilberto Hernández Guerrero
  - Manuel León Hoyos
- Sport rivalries:
  - Football: (Brazil • Costa Rica • United States)
  - Baseball: (Cuba)
  - Boxing: (Puerto Rico)
- Others:
  - List of Mexican UFC fighters
  - List of Mexican records in swimming
  - Siquitibum
