= Lorena, Light-Footed Woman =

2019 documentary film

- Film poster
- Directed by: Juan Carlos Rulfo
- Starring: Lorena Ramirez; Mario Ramírez; Santiago Ramírez
- Production company: No Ficción
- Distributed by: Netflix
- Release date: November 20, 2019
- Running time: 28 minutes
- Country: Mexico
- Languages: Spanish; Tarahumara

Lorena, Light-Footed Woman is a 2019 documentary film directed by Juan Carlos Rulfo and starring Lorena Ramirez, Mario Ramírez and Santiago Ramírez. The premise revolves around Lorena, a long-distance runner from Mexico.

== Cast ==
- Lorena Ramirez
- Mario Ramírez
- Santiago Ramírez
- Juana Ramírez
- Talina Ramírez
- Diego Ramírez
- Yolanda Ramírez
- Rubén Ramírez
- María de Jesús Hernández

== Release ==
Lorena, Light-Footed Woman was released on November 20, 2019, on Netflix.
