= Mexican Major Rugby League =

Mexican rugby union league

- Sport: Rugby union
- Founded: 2000
- No. of teams: 21
- Country: Mexico
- Most recent champion: Tazmania RFC

The Mexican Major Rugby League was Mexico's premier rugby union league, consisting of 21 teams at the height of its existence.

== History ==
In 2000 the Mexican Rugby Federation (FMRU) decided to create a professional rugby league. It has since dissolved, though the FMRU is in talks with America's premier Rugby league, Major League Rugby, to add a Mexican expansion team, particularly in Monterrey due to its economic ties with the United States and its proximity to the border. The main proponents of this movement are the Azcárraga family, a wealthy Mexican media dynasty, rumoured to have made an offer to Major League Rugby and Super Rugby Americas for $250 million, but were turned down due to their demand for two clubs.

== Teams ==
- Aztecas Rugby Club
- Black Thunder Rugby Football Club
- Rugby Borregos Chihuahua
- Universidad de Celaya Rugby Club
- Cumiyais Monterrey Rugby Club
- Dragones Rugby Club
- Eek´Baalam Rugby Club
- Universidad de Guanajuato Rugby Club
- Hammerheads Cancún Rugby Club
- IPN Hell Sharks Rugby Team
- Jaguares Football Rugby Club
- Legion de Cuervos Rugby Club
- Leones Rugby Club Colima
- Lobos Rugby Club
- Maori Rugby Football Club
- Miquiztli Rugby Club
- Queretaro Rugby Club
- Rhinos Rugby Club Guadalajara
- Tazmania Rugby Club
- Templarios Rugby Football Club
- Tomas Moro Rugby Club
- Pumas Rugby UNAM
- Wallabies Rugby Football Club
- University of Monterrey (UDEM) Troyanos (as) Rugby Club
