= María Lorena Ramírez =

Mexican long-distance runner

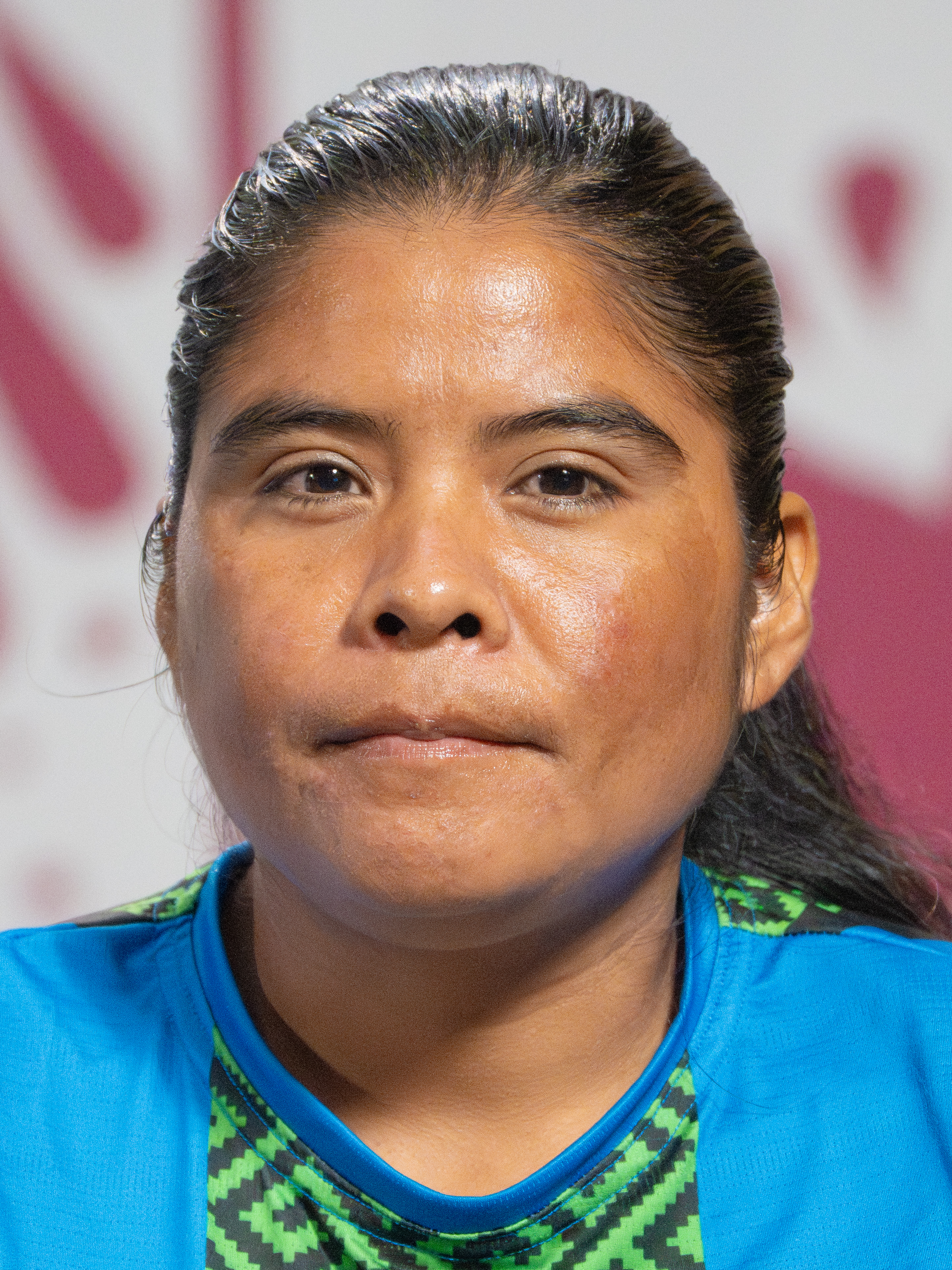
- María Lorena Ramírez in 2025

Personal information
- Born: 1 January 1995 (age 31) Guachochi, Chihuahua

Sport
- Country: Mexico
- Sport: Marathon, ultramarathon

María Lorena Ramírez Hernández (born January 1, 1995) is an indigenous long-distance runner belonging to the Rarámuri ethnic group. She lives in Rejocochi, a small community in the state of Chihuahua, Mexico. She became internationally known after winning the Cerro Rojo UltraTrail in 2017, an ultra-distance race of 50 kilometers while wearing huaraches. She finished with a time of 07:20. She competes wearing traditional garb including her trademark long skirt.

== Biography ==
Ramírez was born and has resided in the locality of Ciénaga de Noragachi, in the municipality of Guachochi. She takes care of her family's goats, walking between 10 and 15 kilometers every day with them. She belongs to a Mexican Indigenous community, the Rarámuri, historically known for their endurance and for their aptitude in long-distance running; in fact, the term Rarámuri means "light feet".

Her brother, her father, and her grandfather have also been runners. Her brother, Mario, participates in the same races as she does. Ramírez even participates in races at greater distances (100 km) and, in some, has been among the first.

In 2019 Ramírez was the subject of a Netflix documentary, Lorena, Light-Footed Woman. In October 2019, she appeared on the cover of Vogue Mexico. She was featured in the music video for Jorge Drexler’s song “Movimiento”.
