= 2004 South American Swimming Championships =

Sporting event

XXXVII South American Swimming Championships
- Host city: Maldonado, Uruguay
- Date(s): March 25–28, 2004
- Events: 40

The 2004 South American Swimming Championships were swum March 25-28 in Maldonado, Uruguay. The championships featured competition in 40 long course (50m) events.

== Participating nations ==
As an event organized by CONSANAT, the confederation that oversees Aquatics in South America, the meet featured its members, including: Argentina, Bolivia, Brazil, Chile, Colombia, Ecuador, Paraguay, Peru, Suriname, Uruguay and Venezuela.

== Results ==
=== Men ===
Event	Gold		Silver		Bronze	
50 free	Jader Souza; Brazil	22.93	Luis Rojas; Venezuela	22.96	Julio Santos; Ecuador	23.15
100 free	Luis Rojas; Venezuela	50.22	Jader Souza; Brazil	50.61	Gustavo Borges; Brazil	51.11
200 free	Rodrigo Castro; Brazil	1:52.79	Giancarlo Zolezzi; Chile; Albert Subirats; Venezuela	1:53.40	not awarded	
400 free	Felipe Araujo; Brazil	3:54.92	Juan Martín Pereyra; Argentina	3:57.82	Giancarlo Zolezzi; Chile	3:59.91
800 free	Juan Martín Pereyra; Argentina	8:12.37	Giancarlo Zolezzi; Chile	8:12.62	Luiz Lima; Brazil	8:16.14
1500 free	Luiz Lima; Brazil	15:42.16	Juan Martín Pereyra; Argentina	15:43.98	Bruno Bonfim; Brazil	16:05.61
50 back	Eduardo Otero; Argentina	26.57	Paulo Machado; Brazil	27.16	Alexandre Massura; Brazil	27.29
100 back	Eduardo Otero; Argentina	56.36	Alexandre Massura; Brazil	58.04	Paulo Machado; Brazil	58.32
200 back	Rogério Romero; Brazil	2:02.02	Lucas Salatta; Brazil	2:05.02	Omar Pinzón; Colombia	2:06.20
50 breast	Eduardo Fischer; Brazil	29.26	Walter Arciprete; Argentina	29.31	Felipe Santos; Brazil	29.42
100 breast	Eduardo Fischer; Brazil	1:03.63	Walter Arciprete; Argentina	1:04.47	Ramiro Palmar; Venezuela	1:05.17
200 breast	Eduardo Fischer; Brazil	2:18.66	Leopoldo Andara; Venezuela	2:24.68	Ramiro Palmar; Venezuela	2:25.29
50 fly	Luis Rojas; Venezuela	24.48	Kaio Almeida; Brazil	24.59	Jader Souza; Brazil	24.80
100 fly	Kaio Almeida; Brazil	54.02	Luis Rojas; Venezuela	54.61	Albert Subirats; Venezuela	54.91
200 fly	Kaio Almeida; Brazil	1:59.19	Juan Pablo Valdivieso; Peru	2:02.33	Lucas Salatta; Brazil	2:03.92
200 IM	Thiago Pereira; Brazil	2:00.19	Lucas Salatta; Brazil	2:05.32	Francisco Picasso; Uruguay	2:09.41
400 IM	Thiago Pereira; Brazil	4:21.27	Lucas Salatta; Brazil	4:22.50	Agustín Fiorilli; Argentina	4:37.13
4×100; Free Relay	Brazil	3:24.89	Venezuela	3:27.24	Argentina	3:27.46
4×200; Free Relay	Brazil	7:35.31	Chile	7:39.87	Argentina	7:41.24
4×100; Medley Relay	Brazil	3:54.40	Argentina	3:56.38	Venezuela	4:00.41

=== Women ===
Event	Gold		Silver		Bronze	
50 free	Flávia Delaroli; Brazil	25.39	Rebeca Gusmão; Brazil	25.74	Manuela Morano; Argentina	26.77
100 free	Rebeca Gusmão; Brazil	56.69	Flávia Delaroli; Brazil	57.41	Diana Lopez; Venezuela	58.78
200 free	Monique Ferreira; Brazil	2:03.17	Mariana Brochado; Brazil	2:04.03	Cecilia Biagioli; Argentina	2:05.13
400 free	Monique Ferreira; Brazil	4:16.74	Cecilia Biagioli; Argentina	4:17.29	Mariana Brochado; Brazil	4:18.16
800 free	Kristel Köbrich; Chile	8:46.63	Cecilia Biagioli; Argentina	9:01.38	Paola Duguet; Colombia	9:02.77
1500 free	Kristel Köbrich; Chile	16:24.39	Cecilia Biagioli; Argentina	17:07.92	Nayara Ribeiro; Brazil	17:13.65
50 back	Fabíola Molina; Brazil	29.78	Serrana Fernández; Uruguay	30.07	Laura Crespo; Brazil	31.32
100 back	Fabíola Molina; Brazil	1:03.74	Serrana Fernández; Uruguay	1:06.05	Laura Crespo; Brazil	1:06.27
200 back	Georgina Bardach; Argentina	2:21.08	Laura Crespo; Brazil	2:23.25	Laura Gomez; Colombia	2:25.32
50 breast	Valeria Silva Merea; Peru	33.30	Agustina de Giovanni; Argentina	33.36	Rebeca Gusmão; Brazil	33.60
100 breast	Javiera Salcedo; Argentina	1:12.18	Agustina de Giovanni; Argentina	1:12.50	Valeria Silva Merea; Peru	1:13.58
200 breast	Javiera Salcedo; Argentina	2:36.42	Agustina de Giovanni; Argentina	2:37.78	Monica Alvarez; Colombia	2:40.28
50 fly	Natalia Grava; Brazil	28.69	Yamilé Bahamonde; Ecuador	28.80	Manuela Morano; Argentina	28.96
100 fly	Fabíola Molina; Brazil	1:02.80	Ivi Monteiro; Brazil	1:03.49	Maria Rodriguez; Venezuela	1:04.38
200 fly	Georgina Bardach; Argentina	2:14.58	Monique Ferreira; Brazil	2:16.69	Vanessa Dueñas; Colombia	2:18.56
200 IM	Georgina Bardach; Argentina	2:16.92	Joanna Maranhão; Brazil	2:17.23	Javiera Salcedo; Argentina	2:22.97
400 IM	Georgina Bardach; Argentina	4:45.70	Joanna Maranhão; Brazil	4:46.01	Lilian Cerroni; Brazil	5:00.43
4×100; Free Relay	Brazil	3:54.40	Argentina	3:56.38	Venezuela	4:00.41
4×200; Free Relay	Brazil	8:29.34	Argentina	8:40.41	Venezuela	8:44.32
4×100; Medley Relay	Brazil	4:16.16	Peru	4:28.65	Venezuela	4:28.89
