= 2012 South American Swimming Championships =

International swimming competition

XLI South American Swimming Championships
- Host city: Belém, Brazil
- Date: March 11–25, 2012
- Nations: 12
- Events: 40

The 41st South American Swimming Championships were held March 11–25, 2012 in Belém, Brazil.

== Participating countries ==
Countries which sent teams were:

- Argentina
- Bolivia
- Brazil
- Chile
- Colombia
- Ecuador
- Panama
- Paraguay
- Peru
- Suriname
- Uruguay
- Venezuela

== Results ==
=== Men ===
Games	Gold		Silver		Bronze	
50m Free	César Cielo Filho; Brazil	21.85	Bruno Fratus; Brazil	22.13	Federico Grabich; Argentina	22.50
100m Free	César Cielo Filho; Brazil	48.70	Bruno Fratus; Brazil	49.69	Federico Grabich; Argentina	49.77
200m Free	Benjamin Hockin; Paraguay	1'48.57	Cristian Quintero; Venezuela	1'48.65	Daniele Tirabassi; Venezuela	1'51.56
400m Free	Martin Naidich; Argentina	3'52.17	Lucas Kanieski; Brazil	3'54.34	Cristian Quintero; Venezuela	3'54.80
800m Free	Juan Martin Pereyra; Argentina	8'03.23	Lucas Kanieski; Brazil	8'04.63	Luiz Arapiraca; Brazil	8'17.40
1500m Free	Lucas Kanieski; Brazil	15'28.23	Juan Martin Pereyra; Argentina	15'34.63	Esteban Paz; Argentina	15'43.60
50m Back	Daniel Orzechowski; Brazil	25.56	Federico Grabich; Argentina	25.62	Omar Pinzón; Colombia	26.19
100m Back	Thiago Pereira; Brazil	55.29	Omar Pinzón; Colombia	55.60	Federico Grabich; Argentina	56.06
200m Back	Omar Pinzón; Colombia	1'59.67	Thiago Pereira; Brazil	2'00.35	Leonardo de Deus; Brazil	2'00.93
50m Breast	Felipe Silva; Brazil	27.39	João Luiz Gomes Júnior; Brazil	28.03	Jorge Murillo; Colombia	28.16
100m Breast	Felipe Silva; Brazil	1'00.76	João Luiz Gomes Júnior; Brazil	1'02.11	Jorge Murillo; Colombia	1'02.84
200m Breast	Jorge Murillo; Colombia	2'14.88	Henrique Barbosa; Brazil	2'15.33	Facundo Miguelena; Argentina	2'17.98
50m Fly	César Cielo Filho; Brazil	23.26	Glauber Silva; Brazil	23.64	Albert Subirats; Venezuela	23.78
100m Fly	Glauber Silva; Brazil	52.80	Albert Subirats; Venezuela	52.96	Benjamin Hockin; Paraguay	53.21
200m Fly	Kaio de Almeida; Brazil	1'58.15	Leonardo de Deus; Brazil	1'58.38	Mauricio Fiol; Peru	2'00.85
200m IM	Thiago Pereira; Brazil	1'58.49	Henrique Rodrigues; Brazil	2'02.35	Omar Pinzón; Colombia	2'02.77
400m IM	Thiago Pereira; Brazil	4'24.49	Esteban Enderica; Ecuador	4'24.97	Esteban Paz; Argentina	4'31.09
4 × 100 m Free Relay	Brazil	3'20.07	Venezuela	3'21.00	Argentina	3'25.25
4 × 200 m Free Relay	Venezuela	7'27.35	Brazil	7'30.13	Argentina	7'32.54
4 × 100 m Medley Relay	Brazil	3'40.34	Paraguay	3'44.99	Colombia	3'45.15
Water polo	Argentina		Brazil		Venezuela	

=== Women ===
Games	Gold		Silver		Bronze	
50m Free	Arlene Semeco; Venezuela	25.21	Graciele Herrmann; Brazil	25.31	Daynara Ferreira; Brazil	25.64
100m Free	Tatiana Lima; Brazil	56.74	Arlene Semeco; Venezuela	56.77	Daynara Ferreira; Brazil	57.25
200m Free	Manuella Lyrio; Brazil	2'00.58	Andreina Pinto; Venezuela	2'00.83	Larissa Oliveira; Brazil	2'01.03
400m Free	Andreina Pinto; Venezuela	4'10.24	Manuella Lyrio; Brazil	4'12.14	Cecilia Biagioli; Argentina	4'12.69
800m Free	Andreina Pinto; Venezuela	8'33.80	Cecilia Biagioli; Argentina	8'35.23	Yanel Adriana Pinto; Venezuela	8'49.02
1500m Free	Cecilia Biagioli; Argentina	16'40.24	Carolina Bilich; Brazil	17'02.20	Samantha Arevalo; Ecuador	17'15.65
50m Back	Etiene Medeiros; Brazil	28.79	Carolina Colorado Henao; Colombia	29.81	Jeserik Pinto; Venezuela	29.84
100m Back	Carolina Colorado Henao; Colombia	1'02.57	Natalia Diniz; Brazil	1'03.19	Etiene Medeiros; Brazil	1'03.75
200m Back	Carolina Colorado Henao; Colombia	2'16.99	Fernanda Alvarenga; Brazil	2'19.34	Elimar Barrios; Venezuela	2'20.64
50m Breast	Ana Carla Carvalho; Brazil	31.89	Mercedes Toledo; Venezuela	32.72	Julia Sebastian; Argentina	32.77
100m Breast	Ana Carla Carvalho; Brazil	1'10.93	Julia Sebastian; Argentina	1'11.19	Mercedes Toledo; Venezuela	1'11.82
200m Breast	Julia Sebastian; Argentina	2'31.59	Mijail Asis; Argentina	2'34.99	Mercedes Toledo; Venezuela	2'38.43
50m Fly	Carolina Colorado Henao; Colombia	26.74 NR	Daynara de Paula; Brazil	26.88	Jeserik Pinto; Venezuela	27.08
100m Fly	Daynara de Paula; Brazil	59.30	Gabriella Silva; Brazil	1'01.30	Carolina Colorado Henao; Colombia	1'01.41
200m Fly	Joanna Maranhão; Brazil	2'11.03	Virginia Bardach; Argentina	2'15.68	Jessica Camposano; Colombia	2'16.65
200m IM	Joanna Maranhão; Brazil	2'16.76	Georgina Bardach; Argentina	2'18.41	Virginia Bardach; Argentina	2'21.07
400m IM	Joanna Maranhão; Brazil	4'41.39	Georgina Bardach; Argentina	4'51.89	Julia Arino; Argentina	4'58.54
4 × 100 m Free Relay	Brazil	3'45.03	Venezuela	3'49.79	Colombia	3'50.32
4 × 200 m Free Relay	Brazil	8'11.60	Venezuela	8'16.41	Colombia	8'29.10
4 × 100 m Medley Relay	Brazil	4'10.50	Venezuela	4'15.54	Argentina	4'15.72
Water polo	Brazil		Argentina		Venezuela	

== Medal standings ==
Final medal standings for the 2012 South American Swimming Championships are:

* Host nation (Brazil)

Rank	Nation	Gold	Silver	Bronze	Total
1	Brazil (BRA)*	25	19	6	50
2	Colombia (COL)	5	2	8	15
3	Argentina (ARG)	4	8	13	25
4	Venezuela (VEN)	4	8	9	21
5	Paraguay (PAR)	1	1	1	3
6	Ecuador (ECU)	0	1	1	2
7	Peru (PER)	0	0	1	1
Totals (7 entries)		39	39	39	117
