= List of Argentine records in swimming =

The Argentine records in swimming are the fastest ever performances of swimmers from Argentina, which are recognised and ratified by Argentina's national swimming federation: CADDA (or C.A.D.D.A.). CADDA stands for la Confederación Argentina de Deportes Acuáticos—the Argentine Aquatic Sports Confederation.

All records were set in finals unless noted otherwise.

== Long course (50 m) ==
=== Men ===
Event	Time		Name	Club	Date	Meet	Location	Ref
50 m freestyle	22.11	h	Guido Buscaglia	Club Deportivo Nados Castellón	20 June 2024	Spanish Championships	Palma de Mallorca, Spain	
100 m freestyle	48.11	r	Federico Grabich	Argentina	14 July 2015	Pan American Games	Toronto, Canada	
200 m freestyle	1:47.39		Federico Grabich	Argentina	30 March 2016	South American Championships	Asunción, Paraguay	
400 m freestyle	3:51.03	h	Juan Martin Pereyra	Argentina	24 July 2011	World Championships	Shanghai, China	
400 m freestyle	3:50.62	#	Lucas Alba	Argentina	16 September 2026	South American Games	Santa Fe, Argentina	
800 m freestyle	7:57.60		Martin Naidich	Argentina	25 April 2013	Maria Lenk Trophy	Rio de Janeiro, Brazil	
800 m freestyle	7:55.78	#	Lucas Alba	Argentina	13 September 2026	South American Games	Santa Fe, Argentina	
1500 m freestyle	15:10.24		Martin Naidich	Argentina	23 April 2013	Maria Lenk Trophy	Rio de Janeiro, Brazil	
50 m backstroke	24.66		Ulises Saravia	C.D. Nados Castellon	15 June 2025	Spanish Championships	Palma de Mallorca, Spain	
100 m backstroke	53.26		Ulises Saravia	C.D. Nados Castellon	11 June 2025	Spanish Championships	Palma de Mallorca, Spain	
200 m backstroke	2:01.82		Juan Ignacio Méndez	Sociedad Alemana de Gimnasia de Villa Ballester	24 February 2021	2nd Selective Evaluation	Buenos Aires, Argentina	
50 m breaststroke	28.25		Gabriel Morelli	IronSwim-AK	12 May 2022	Chilean Championships	Santiago, Chile	
100 m breaststroke	1:01.42		Facundo Miguelena	-	17 May 2014	Argentine Championships	Mar del Plata, Argentina	
200 m breaststroke	2:12.56		Gabriel Morelli	Argentina	11 December 2020	Maria Lenk Trophy	Rio de Janeiro, Brazil	
50m butterfly	23.57		Santiago Grassi	Club Atletico Union DE Santafe	27 July 2023	-		
50m butterfly	23.44	h, #	Santiago Grassi	Argentina	14 September 2026	South American Games	Santa Fe, Argentina	
100m butterfly	51.78		Santiago Grassi	Beach	17 May 2024	Atlanta Classic	Atlanta, United States	
200m butterfly	1:58.18		Andres Jose Gonzalez	Argentina	8 May 2009	-	Rio de Janeiro, Brazil	
200m individual medley	2:01.47		Joaquin Gonzalez Piñero	Sociedad Alemana de Gimnasia de Villa Ballester	7 December 2020	-	Dubai, United Arab Emirates	
400m individual medley	4:21.47	h	Joaquin Gonzalez Piñero	Gator Swim Club	31 March 2022	TYR Pro Swim Series	San Antonio, United States	
4×50m freestyle relay (national)	1:34.28		Santiago Grassi (24.38); Marcos Barale (23.66); Facundo Miguelena (23.76); Guido Buscaglia (22.56)	Argentina	6 April 2015	Maria Lenk Trophy	Rio de Janeiro, Brazil	
4×50m freestyle relay (club)	1:34.60		Fernandez; Rusiecki; Ahmed; Rodriguez	MAVEL	21 October 2023			
4×100m freestyle relay (national)	3:17.41		Federico Grabich (48.11); Matías Aguilera (49.79); Lautaro Rodríguez (49.72); Guido Buscaglia (49.79)	Argentina	14 July 2015	Pan American Games	Toronto, Canada	
4×100m freestyle relay (club)	3:23.97		Martin; Ludueña; Saravia; Buscaglia	Club Atlético Once Unidos	28 April 2023			
4×200m freestyle relay (national)	7:22.82		Federico Grabich (1:48.34); Juan Pereyra (1:51.80); Guido Buscaglia (1:52.15); Martín Naidich (1:50.53)	Argentina	15 July 2015	Pan American Games	Toronto, Canada	
4×200m freestyle relay (club)	7:36.04		Sales Rubio; Pereyra; Agustín Fiorilli; José Meolans	Club Atlético Riberas Del Paraná	9 December 2005			
4×50m medley relay (club)	1:44.03		Eduardo Otero; Walter Arciprete; Santiago Cavanagh; José Meolans	Club Atlético Riberas Del Paraná	25 October 2006	-	Buenos Aires, Argentina	
4×100m medley relay (national)	3:36.53		Ulises Saravia (53.76); Dante Nicola Rho (1:01.72); Ulises Cazau (52.23); Matias Santiso (48.82)	Argentina	14 August 2025	Junior Pan American Games	Asunción, Paraguay	
4×100m medley relay (club)	3:45.94		Hernandez; Morelli; Deferrari; Ghione	Club Atlético Unión de Santa Fe	25 April 2023			

Legend: # – Record awaiting ratification by C.A.D.D.A.; WR – World record; AM – Americas record; e – equalled existing record;
Records not set in finals: h – heat; sf – semifinal; r – relay 1st leg; rh – relay heat 1st leg; b – B final; † – en route to final mark; so – swim-off; tt – time trial

=== Women ===
Event	Time		Name	Club	Date	Meet	Location	Ref
50m freestyle	25.47		Andrea Berrino	JUSC	22 May 2026	Maria Lenk Trophy	Rio de Janeiro, Brazil	
100m freestyle	55.56		Nadia Colovini	-	30 April 2009	-	Buenos Aires, Argentina	
200m freestyle	1:58.79		Agostina Hein	Argentina	17 April 2026	South American Youth Games	Panama City, Panama	
400m freestyle	4:02.99		Agostina Hein	Argentina	30 May 2026	Mare Nostrum	Barcelona, Spain	
800m freestyle	8:22.01		Agostina Hein	Argentina	16 April 2026	South American Youth Games	Panama City, Panama	
1500m freestyle	15:51.68		Delfina Pignatiello	Argentina	15 June 2019	Mare Nostrum	Barcelona, Spain	
50m backstroke	27.80	sf	Andrea Berrino	Argentina	26 July 2017	World Championships	Budapest, Hungary	
100m backstroke	1:00.42		Cecilia Dieleke	Argentina	17 April 2026	South American Youth Games	Panama City, Panama	
200m backstroke	2:10.36		Malena Santillan	Argentina	11 August 2025	Junior Pan American Games	Asunción, Paraguay	
200m backstroke	2:10.05	#	Cecilia Dieleke	Argentina	1 November 2026	Youth Olympic Games	Dakar, Senegal	
50m breaststroke	30.56	sf	Macarena Ceballos	Argentina	2 August 2025	World Championships	Singapore, Singapore	
100m breaststroke	1:06.69	h	Macarena Ceballos	Argentina	24 July 2023	World Championships	Fukuoka, Japan	
200m breaststroke	2:24.92		Julia Sebastián	Minas TC	17 April 2019	Maria Lenk Trophy	Rio de Janeiro, Brazil	
50m butterfly	27.09		Iara Fernandez	Club Atletico River Plate	22 April 2026	Argentine Junior Championships	Buenos Aires, Argentina	
50m butterfly	27.04	#	Iara Fernandez	Argentina	14 September 2026	South American Games	Santa Fe, Argentina	
100m butterfly	58.82		Agostina Hein	SER Natación de Zárate	19 December 2025	Argentine Open	Buenos Aires, Argentina	
200m butterfly	2:10.80		Virginia Bardach	Argentina	9 November 2018	South American Championships	Trujillo, Peru	
200m individual medley	2:10.63		Agostina Hein	SER Natación de Zárate	6 May 2026	Argentine Championships	Buenos Aires, Argentina	
400m individual medley	4:34.34		Agostina Hein	Argentina	19 August 2025	World Junior Championships	Otopeni, Romania	
400m individual medley	4:32.54	#	Agostina Hein	Argentina	13 August 2026	Pan Pacific Championships	Irvine, United States	
4×50m freestyle relay (national)	1:46.15		Belén Díaz (26.98); Cecilia Bertoncello (26.76); Julia Arino (27.38); Aixa Triay (25.03)	Argentina	6 April 2015	Maria Lenk Trophy	Rio de Janeiro, Brazil	
4×50m freestyle relay (club)	1:47.57		Dias; Pons; Almeida; Panzini	Club Municipalidad Córdoba	11 January 2019			
4×100m freestyle relay (national)	3:47.72		María Ruggiero (56.98); Lucía Gauna (56.83); Macarena Ceballoso (56.98); Andrea Berrino (56.93)	Argentina	4 October 2022 (Note: by official result source; 4 November 2022 by federation source, a typo)	South American Games	Asunción, Paraguay	
4×100m freestyle relay (club)	3:50.50		Macarena Ceballos; Fernandini; Magdalena Portela Walter; Andrea Berrino	Sociedad Alemana de Gimnasia de Villa Ballester	28 April 2023			
4×200m freestyle relay (national)	8:09.83		Delfina Pignatiello (2:01.72); Virginia Bardach (2:01.36); Delfina Dini (2:04.80); Andrea Berrino (2:01.95)	Argentina	10 November 2018	South American Championships	Trujillo, Peru	
4×200m freestyle relay (club)	8:28.87		Jativa Rivero; Pedreira Vico; Riggiero; Gauna	Club Atlético Once Unidos	26 April 2023			
4×50m medley relay (national)	1:59.72		Arce; Marcantonio; Julieta Lema; Delfina Pignatiello	Argentina	19 January 2018	-		
4×50m medley relay (club)	2:01.65		Valentini; Presumido; Cecilia Bertoncello; Peroni	Club Atlético Riberas Del Paraná	10 December 2016	-		
4×100m medley relay (national)	4:07.48		Andrea Berrino (1:00.45); Macarena Ceballos (1:08.70); Virginia Bardach (1:00.80); Maria Belen Diaz (57.53)	Argentina	3 April 2016	South American Championships	Asunción, Paraguay	
4×100m medley relay (club)	4:14.59		Andrea Berrino; Macarena Ceballos; Magdalena Portela Walter; Fernandini	Sociedad Alemana de Gimnasia de Villa Ballester	25 April 2023	-		

Legend: # – Record awaiting ratification by CADDA; WR – World record; AM – Americas record; e – equalled existing record;
Records not set in finals: h – heat; sf – semifinal; r – relay 1st leg; rh – relay heat 1st leg; b – B final; † – en route to final mark; so – swim-off; tt – time trial

=== Mixed relay ===
Event	Time	Name	Club	Date	Meet	Location	Ref
4×100 m freestyle relay	3:31.24	Guido Buscaglia (49.81); Matias Santiso (49.08); Guillermina Ruggiero (56.12); Lucia Gauna (56.23)	Argentina	22 October 2023	Pan American Games	Santiago, Chile	
4×100 m medley relay	3:50.53	Andrea Berrino (1:02.61); Julia Sebastián (1:07.55); Santiago Grassi (51.65); Federico Grabich (48.72)	Argentina	8 August 2019	Pan American Games	Lima, Peru	

Legend: # – Record awaiting ratification by CADDA; WR – World record; AM – Americas record; e – equalled existing record;
Records not set in finals: h – heat; so – swim-off

== Short course (25 m) ==
=== Men ===
Event	Time		Name	Club	Date	Meet	Location	Ref
50m freestyle	21.36		José Meolans	Argentina	5 April 2002	-	Moscow, Russia	
100m freestyle	47.09		José Meolans	Argentina	7 April 2002	-	Moscow, Russia	
200m freestyle	1:45.55		Federico Grabich	Argentina	1 September 2014	José Finkel Trophy	Guaratinguetá, Brazil	
400m freestyle	3:47.20		Lucas Alba	Atletico River Plate	20 October 2022	Torneo 53 Aniversario FENABA	Buenos Aires, Argentina	
800m freestyle	7:49.53		Lucas Alba	Argentina	17 December 2022	World Championships	Melbourne, Australia	
1500m freestyle	14:50.33		Martín Naidich	Sociedad Alemana de Gimnasia de Villa Ballester	16 May 2015	Argentine Championships	Santa Fe, Argentina	
50m backstroke	23.63	r	Ulises Saravia	Club Deportivo Nados Castellon	21 December 2023	Spanish Club Cup Division of Honor	Barcelona, Spain	
100m backstroke	51.67		Ulises Saravia	Club Deportivo Nados Castellon	21 December 2023 (Note: by official result source; 23 December 2023 by C.A.D.D.A. source, a typo)	Spanish Club Cup Division of Honor	Barcelona, Spain	
200m backstroke	1:55.83		Ulises Saravia	C.D. Nados Castellon	30 March 2025	Autonomous Cup Clubs Honor Division	Castellón de la Plana, Spain	
50m breaststroke	27.14		Facundo Rusiecki	Mavel	29 October 2021			
100m breaststroke	59.49		Gabriel Morelli	Atletico Union Santa Fe	22 October 2022	Torneo 53 Aniversario FENABA	Buenos Aires, Argentina	
200m breaststroke	2:07.39		Gabriel Morelli	Atletico Union Santa Fe	20 October 2022	Torneo 53 Aniversario FENABA	Buenos Aires, Argentina	
50m butterfly	23.26	h	Santiago Grassi	Argentina	19 December 2021	World Championships	Abu Dhabi, United Arab Emirates	
100m butterfly	51.32	h	Santiago Grassi	Argentina	17 December 2021	World Championships	Abu Dhabi, United Arab Emirates	
200m butterfly	1:56.26		Joaquin Gonzalez Piñero	University of Florida	18 October 2024	Virginia vs Florida Dual Meet	Charlottesville, United States	
100m individual medley	54.40		Guido Buscaglia	Atlético Once Unidos	30 October 2021	-		
200m individual medley	1:57.63		Joaquin Gonzalez Piñero	University of Florida	18 October 2024	Virginia vs Florida Dual Meet	Charlottesville, United States	
400m individual medley	4:14.35		Joaquín González Piñero	Sociedad Alemana de Gimnasia de Villa Ballester	27 November 2020	Speedo Invitational Gala	Dubai, United Arab Emirates	
4×50m freestyle relay (club)	1:32.40		Melconian; Agustín Fiorilli; Eduardo Otero; José Meolans	Club Atlético Riberas Del Paraná	1 July 2007	-		
4×100m freestyle relay (national)	3:14.91	h	Matías Aguilera (48.78); Guido Buscaglia (49.75); Joaquín Belza (49.03); Federico Grabich (47.35)	Argentina	3 December 2014	World Championships	Doha, Qatar	
4×100m freestyle relay (club)	3:21.74		Aguilera; Sales Rubio; Zarate; José Meolans	Club Atlético Riberas Del Paraná	16 June 2005	-		
4×200m freestyle relay (national)	7:13.53	h	Guido Buscaglia (1:49.69); Martín Naidich (1:50.04); Matías Aguilera (1:47.19); Federico Grabich (1:46.61)	Argentina	4 December 2014	World Championships	Doha, Qatar	
4×200m freestyle relay (club)	7:22.27		Lupacchini; Cassini; Martín Naidich; Vera	Sociedad Alemana de Gimnasia de Villa Ballester	15 May 2015	-		
4×50m medley relay (club)	1:37.90		Eduardo Otero; Walter Arciprete; Santiago Cavanagh; José Meolans	Club Atlético Riberas Del Paraná	16 March 2006	-	La Rioja, Argentina	
4×100m medley relay (national)	3:39.92	h	Eduardo Otero; Sergio Ferreyra; Gustavo Paschetta; Matias Aguilera	Argentina	13 April 2008	World Championships	Manchester, Great Britain	
4×100m medley relay (club)	3:40.97		Di Paolo; Morelli; Hernandez; Mendez Brandt	Club Atlético Unión de Santa Fe	21 October 2022			

Legend: # – Record awaiting ratification by C.A.D.D.A.; WR – World record; AM – Americas record; e – equalled existing record;
Records not set in finals: h – heat; sf – semifinal; r – relay 1st leg; rh – relay heat 1st leg; b – B final; † – en route to final mark; so – swim-off; tt – time trial

=== Women ===
Event	Time		Name	Club	Date	Meet	Location	Ref
50m freestyle	24.84		Andrea Berrino	Associacao Santa	14 September 2016	José Finkel Trophy	Santos, Brazil	
100m freestyle	54.16		Agostina Hein	Argentina	12 December 2025	São Paulo Summer Open	São Paulo, Brazil	
200m freestyle	1:56.30		Agostina Hein	Ser Natacion	6 September 2025	Copa España	Santiago, Chile	
400m freestyle	4:04.17		Agostina Hein	Argentina	15 November 2024	São Paulo Summer Championships	São Paulo, Brazil	
800m freestyle	8:22.76		Delfina Pignatiello	Municipalidad DE San Isidro	23 September 2018	Argentine Championships	Santa Fe, Argentina	
1500m freestyle	15:48.32		Delfina Pignatiello	Argentina	21 July 2018	Murrays All Saints Preparation Meet	Gold Coast, Australia	
50m backstroke	27.03	h	Andrea Berrino	Argentina	9 December 2016	World Championships	Windsor, Canada	
100m backstroke	57.88	h	Andrea Berrino	Argentina	6 December 2016	World Championships	Windsor, Canada	
200m backstroke	2:05.06	h	Andrea Berrino	Argentina	5 December 2014	World Championships	Doha, Qatar	
50m breaststroke	30.04		Macarena Ceballos	Corinthians	15 September 2022	José Finkel Trophy	Recife, Brazil	
100m breaststroke	1:05.06		Julia Sebastian	LA Current	22 November 2020	International Swimming League	Budapest, Hungary	
200m breaststroke	2:20.51		Julia Sebastian	LA Current	21 November 2020	International Swimming League	Budapest, Hungary	
50m butterfly	26.98	b	Macarena Ceballos	Corinthians	16 September 2022	José Finkel Trophy	Recife, Brazil	
100m butterfly	58.90		Agostina Hein	Ser Natacion	5 September 2025	Spain Cup	Santiago, Chile	
200m butterfly	2:10.56		Georgina Bardach	Argentina	17 October 2009	World Cup	Durban, South Africa	
200m butterfly	2:10.06	#	Agostina Hein	Ser Natacion	25 October 2026	Sierras Cup	San Luis, Argentina	
100m individual medley	1:01.04		Macarena Ceballos	Corinthians	17 September 2022	José Finkel Trophy	Recife, Brazil	
200m individual medley	2:10.57		Agostina Hein	Argentina	13 December 2025	São Paulo Summer Open	São Paulo, Brazil	
200m individual medley	2:08.70		Agostina Hein	Argentina	15 October 2026	FENABA Anniversary Tournament	Buenos Aires, Argentina	
400m individual medley	4:35.56		Georgina Bardach	Argentina	9 September 2004	-	Santos, Brazil	
400m individual medley	4:32.73		Agostina Hein	Ser Natacion	24 October 2026	Sierras Cup	San Luis, Argentina	
4×50m freestyle relay (national)	1:44.73		Aixa Triay (25.8); Cecilia Bertoncello (26.5); Fiorencia Panzini (27.2); Maria Belen Díaz (25.7)	Argentina	1 September 2014	José Finkel Trophy	Guaratinguetá, Brazil	
4×50m freestyle relay (club)	1:48.43		de Landa; Ferrari; Presumido; Virginia Bardach	Sociedad Alemana de Gimnasia de Villa Ballester	17 May 2015			
4×100m freestyle relay (national)	3:45.44		Cecilia Bertoncello (57.66); Aixa Triay (54.77); Virginia Bardach (56.25); Maria Belen Díaz (56.25)	Argentina	5 September 2014	José Finkel Trophy	Guaratinguetá, Brazil	
4×100m freestyle relay (club)	3:49.46		Ruggiero; Pons; Pedreira; Gauna	Club Atlético Once Unidos	20 October 2022			
4×200m freestyle relay (national)	8:17.82		Ariana Ghirard; Nazarena Metti; Nicole Marmol Gilbert; Cecilia Biagioli	-	27 August 2009	-	Santa Fe, Argentina	
4×200m freestyle relay (club)	8:26.29		Ferrari; de Landa; Berraud; Virginia Bardach	Sociedad Alemana de Gimnasia de Villa Ballester	14 May 2015			
4×50m medley relay (club)	1:57.63		Cecilia Bertoncello; Javiera Salcedo; Manuela Morano; Nadia Colovini	Club Atlético Riberas Del Paraná	24 May 2007	-	Buenos Aires, Argentina	
4×100m medley relay (national)	4:06.03		Cecilia Bertoncello (1:01.01); Macarena Ceballos (1:08.25); Maria Belen Díaz (1:01.50); Aixa Triay (55.27)	Argentina	6 September 2014	José Finkel Trophy	Guaratinguetá, Brazil	
4×100m medley relay (club)	4:08.64		Andrea Berrino; Macarena Ceballos; Castro; ?	Sociedad Alemana de Gimnasia de Villa Ballester	21 October 2022			

Legend: # – Record awaiting ratification by C.A.D.D.A.; WR – World record; AM – Americas record; e – equalled existing record;
Records not set in finals: h – heat; sf – semifinal; r – relay 1st leg; rh – relay heat 1st leg; b – B final; † – en route to final mark; so – swim-off; tt – time trial

=== Mixed relay ===
Event	Time		Name	Club	Date	Meet	Location	Ref
4×50 m freestyle relay								
4×50 m medley relay	1:44.00	h	Gaston Hernandez (24.97); MacArena Ceballos (30.88); Marcos Barale (23.54); Andrea Berrino (24.61)	Argentina	8 December 2016	World Championships	Windsor, Canada	
4×100 m medley relay	3:52.11		Materano Martinez; MacArena Ceballos; G. Toledo; Andrea Berrino	Sociedad Alemana de Gimnasia de Villa Ballester	26 October 2024	-		

Legend: # – Record awaiting ratification by C.A.D.D.A.; WR – World record; AM – Americas record; e – equalled existing record;
Records not set in finals: h – heat; so – swim-off
