= Swimming at the 2006 South American Games =

The swimming competition at the 2006 South American Games consisted of 44 events held November 15–18, 2006 in Buenos Aires, Argentina.

== Results ==
=== Men's events ===
Event	Gold		Silver		Bronze	
50m freestyle	José Meolans; Argentina	22.66 RS	Arthur Rocha; Brazil	23.28	Jader Souza; Brazil	23.40
100m freestyle	José Meolans; Argentina	49.48 RS	Matias Aguilera; Argentina	50.56	Jose Melconian; Uruguay	51.33
200m freestyle	Martín Kutscher; Uruguay	1:52.35 RS	Crox Acuña; Venezuela	1:52.71	Raphael Bydlowski; Brazil	1:53.6
400m freestyle	Erwin Maldonado; Venezuela	3:59.57 RS	Juan Pereyra; Argentina	4:00.09	Alejandro Gomez; Venezuela	4:00.34
800m freestyle	Luiz Arapiraca; Brazil	8:11.87 RS	Erwin Maldonado; Venezuela	8:11.88	Juan Pereyra; Argentina	8:15.59
1500m freestyle	Luiz Arapiraca; Brazil	15:38.98 RS	Esteban Paz; Argentina	15:43.90	Erwin Maldonado; Venezuela	15:51.57
50m backstroke	Eduardo Otero; Argentina	26.25 RS	Arthur Rocha; Brazil	26.97	Daniel Orzechowski; Brazil	26.98
100m backstroke	Joaquin Belza; Argentina	57.13 RS	Daniel Orzechowski; Brazil	57.19	Guilherme Guido; Brazil	57.39
200m backstroke	Joaquin Belza; Argentina	2:05.00 RS	Guilherme Guido; Brazil	2:07.51	Reymer Vezga; Venezuela	2:07.70
50m breaststroke	Eduardo Fischer; Brazil	28.69 RS	Édgar Crespo; Panama	29.48	Felipe Silva; Brazil	29.50
100m breaststroke	Eduardo Fischer; Brazil	1:03.34 RS	Felipe Silva; Brazil	1:04.16	Sergio Ferreyra; Argentina	1:04.22
200m breaststroke	Thiago Parravicini; Brazil	2:17.15 RS	Sergio Ferreyra; Argentina	2:19.31	Diego Bonilla; Colombia	2:22.17
50m butterfly	Jader Souza; Brazil	24.80 RS	Gustavo Paschetta; Argentina	24.81	Arthur Rocha; Brazil	25.31
100m butterfly	Julio Galofre; Colombia	55.41 RS	Mariano Caviglia; Argentina	55.70	Gordon Touw Ngie Tjou; Suriname	55.73
200m butterfly	Gaston Rodríguez; Argentina	2:03.04 RS	Julio Galofre; Colombia	2:04.56	Jose Crescimbeni; Peru	2:05.48
200m I.M.	Joaquin Belza; Argentina	2:05.85 RS	Diogo Yabe; Brazil	2:06.09	Diego Bonilla; Colombia	2:07.39
400m I.M.	Diogo Yabe; Brazil	4:31.91 RS	Ricardo Kojima; Brazil	4:32.14	Leopoldo Andara; Venezuela	4:32.49
4 × 100 m freestyle relay	Argentina; Meolans, Otero, Belza, Aguilera	3:24.16 RS	Brazil; Bydlowski, Souza, Yabe, Rocha	3:25.84	Uruguay; Melconian, Mafio, Queipo, Kutscher	3:28.85
4 × 200 m freestyle relay	Venezuela; Morales, Acuña, Maldonado, Gomez	7:35.09 RS	Chile; Zolezzi, Schnettler, Guzman, Mallat	7:37.17	Brazil; Bydlowski, Yabe, Fim, Arapiraca	7:38.92
4 × 100 m medley relay	Argentina; Belza, Ferreyra, Caviglia, Meolans	3:46.46 RS	Brazil; Orzechowski, Fischer, Alves, Souza	3:47.37	Venezuela; Vezga, Pinto, Andara, Acuña	3:54.79
5K	Allan do Carmo; Brazil		Fabio Lima; Brazil		Roberto Peñalillo; Chile	
10K	Roberto Peñalillo; Chile	1:14:10	Erwin Maldonado; Venezuela	1:14:18	Francisco Sales; Argentina	1:14:19

=== Women's events ===
Event	Gold		Silver		Bronze	
50m freestyle	Arlene Semeco; Venezuela	25.82 RS	Natalia Grava; Brazil	26.41	Yamilé Bahamonde; Ecuador	26.62
100m freestyle	Arlene Semeco; Venezuela	57.18 RS	Monique Ferreira; Brazil	58.38	Michelle Lenhardt; Brazil	58.47
200m freestyle	Cecilia Biagioli; Argentina	2:02.70 RS	Monique Ferreira; Brazil	2:04.31	Monick Perez; Brazil	2:04.75
400m freestyle	Cecilia Biagioli; Argentina	4:13.63 RS	Kristel Köbrich; Chile	4:18.77	Monique Ferreira; Brazil	4:20.69
800m freestyle	Kristel Köbrich; Chile	8:43.79 RS	Cecilia Biagioli; Argentina	8:48.62	Yanel Pinto; Venezuela	8:55.71
1500m freestyle	Kristel Köbrich; Chile	16:30.55 RS	Cecilia Biagioli; Argentina	16:56.67	Yanel Pinto; Venezuela	17:17.67
50m backstroke	Carolina Colorado Henao; Colombia	30.14 RS	Jeserik Pinto; Venezuela	30.35	Fernanda Alvarenga; Brazil	31.00
100m backstroke	Carolina Colorado Henao; Colombia	1:04.73	Erin Volcán; Venezuela	1:05.30	Fernanda Alvarenga; Brazil	1:05.92
200m backstroke	Georgina Bardach; Argentina	2:17.82	Erin Volcán; Venezuela	2:18.27	Rebeca Bretanha; Brazil	2:22.17
50m breaststroke	Javiera Salcedo; Argentina	33.12 RS	Mariana Katsuno; Brazil	33.80	Malena Coschiza; Argentina	34.22
100m breaststroke	Javiera Salcedo; Argentina	1:12.24 RS	Gloria González; Venezuela	1:14.96	Mariana Katsuno; Brazil	1:15.06
200m breaststroke	Georgina Bardach; Argentina	2:35.48 RS	Agustina De Giovanni; Argentina	2:37.20	Nora Miro; Peru	2:41.23
50m butterfly	Gabriella Silva; Brazil	27.95 RS	Natalia Grava; Brazil	28.09	Yamilé Bahamonde; Ecuador	28.45
100m butterfly	Gabriella Silva; Brazil	1:01.54 RS	Florencia Ghione; Argentina	1:03.30	Alejandra Rodriguez; Venezuela	1:03.66
200m butterfly	Florencia Ghione; Argentina	2:16.11 RS	Andreina Pinto; Venezuela	2:17.63	Alejandra Rodrguez; Venezuela	2:18.47
200m I.M.	Georgina Bardach; Argentina	2:17.49 RS	Agustina De Giovanni; Argentina	2:21.47	Larissa Cieslak; Brazil	2:23.05
400m I.M.	Georgina Bardach; Argentina	4:53.42 RS	Larissa Cieslak; Brazil	5:02.96	Silvia Perez; Venezuela	5:03.22
4 × 100 m freestyle relay	Brazil; Lenhardt, Grava, Ribeiro, Ferreira	3:53.16 RS	Venezuela; Pinto, Volcán, Pinto, Semeco	3:54.09	Argentina; Colovini, De Giovanni, Bardach, Biagioli	3:55.21
4 × 200 m freestyle relay	Argentina; Colovini, Biagioli, De Giovanni, Bardach	8:27.26 RS	Brazil; Perez, Jatoba, Ribeiro, Ferreira	8:29.32	Venezuela; Marquez, Pinto, Pinto, Volcán	8:30.76
4 × 100 m medley relay	Venezuela; Volcán, González, Rodriguez, Semeco	4:18.47 RS	Argentina; Bardach, Salcedo, Ghione, Biagioli	4:19.87		
5K	Ana Marcela Cunha; Brazil		Pilar Geijo; Argentina		Celeste Punet; Argentina	
10K	Ana Marcela Cunha; Brazil	1:17:26	Pilar Geijo; Argentina	1:17:47	Pamela Barbosa Engel; Brazil	1:19:07

== Medal table ==
Rank	Nation	Gold	Silver	Bronze	Total
1	Argentina (ARG)	19	16	6	41
2	Brazil (BRA)	12	15	16	43
3	Venezuela (VEN)	5	9	11	25
4	Chile (CHI)	3	2	1	6
5	Colombia (COL)	3	1	2	6
6	Uruguay (URU)	1	0	2	3
7	Panama (PAN)	0	1	0	1
8	Ecuador (ECU)	0	0	2	2
8	Peru (PER)	0	0	2	2
10	Suriname (SUR)	0	0	1	1
Totals (10 entries)		43	44	43	130
