= Swimming at the 2011 Pan American Games =

- Venue: Scotiabank Aquatics Center
- Dates: October 15–22
- Competitors: 274 from 36 nations

The Swimming competition at the XVI Pan American Games was October 15–22, 2011 at the Scotiabank Aquatics Center in Guadalajara, Mexico. The open water events swam in the waters off API Maritime Terminal in Puerto Vallarta.

== Participating countries ==
274 athletes from 36 countries were entered in Swimming and Open Water events at the Games (note: 13 countries were entered in Open Water, but all those countries were also entered in pool events as well):

- Antigua and Barbuda (2)
- Argentina (18)
- Aruba (3)
- Bahamas (5)
- Barbados (4)
- Bermuda (3)
- Bolivia (2)
- Brazil (38)
- Canada (19)
- Cayman Islands (4)
- Chile (5)
- Colombia (6)
- Costa Rica (2)
- Cuba (6)
- Dominican Republic (1)
- Ecuador (2)
- El Salvador (2)
- Grenada (1)
- Guatemala (2)
- Guyana (2)
- Honduras (5)
- Jamaica (3)
- Mexico (28)
- Netherlands Antilles (2)
- Nicaragua (2)
- Panama (2)
- Paraguay (6)
- Peru (10)
- Puerto Rico (8)
- Saint Lucia (1)
- Saint Vincent and the Grenadines (1)
- Suriname (2)
- United States (43)
- Uruguay (6)
- Venezuela (27)
- Virgin Islands (1)

Benjamin Hockin gave Paraguay its first medal in the history of swimming at the Pan American Games, a bronze in the men's 200 m freestyle.

== Event schedule ==
The Amateur Swimming Union of the Americas (ASUA) originally proposed an 8-day format for the Games, mimicking the Olympic order format with prelims/semifinals/finals. However, this was changed in June 2010 at the bequest of the local organizers to a 7-day format, changing to a prelims/finals only (with A&B finals). The shortening was to allow for the Open Water races, which were the day following the Swimming competition, to move from Sunday, October 23, 2011, to Saturday, October 22 in Puerto Vallarta. As part of the formatting change, the men's 1500 free and women's 800 free were also moved from the last two days of the schedule to earlier in the program to distance them from the open water swim.

Sat. 10/15	Sun. 10/16	Mon. 10/17	Tue. 10/18	Wed. 10/19	Thu. 10/20	Fri. 10/21	Sat. 10/22
100 fly (w); 400 IM (m); 400 IM (w); 400 free (m); 4 × 100 free relay (w)	100 back (w); 100 free (m); 200 free (w); 100 breast (m); 4 × 100 free relay (m)	400 free (w); 1500 free (m)-prelims 200 fly (m); 100 breast (w); 100 back (m)	200 free (m); 200 IM (w); 800 free (w)-prelims 1500 free (m); 200 breast (m); 4 × 200 free relay (w)	100 free (w); 200 IM (m); 800 free (w); 200 fly (w); 4 × 200 free relay (m)	50 free (m); 200 breast (w); 100 fly (m); 200 back (w)	50 free (w); 200 back (m); 4 × 100 medley relay (w); 4 × 100 medley relay (M)	10 km open water(w); 10 km open water(m)

== Results ==
=== Men ===
Event	Gold		Silver		Bronze	
50 m freestyle	César Cielo; Brazil	21.58 GR	Bruno Fratus; Brazil	22.05	Hanser García; Cuba	22.15; NR
100 m freestyle	César Cielo; Brazil	47.84 GR	Hanser García; Cuba	48.34; NR	Shaune Fraser; Cayman Islands	48.64
200 m freestyle	Brett Fraser; Cayman Islands	1:47.18 GR	Shaune Fraser; Cayman Islands	1:48.29	Benjamin Hockin; Paraguay	1:48.48
400 m freestyle	Charlie Houchin; United States	3:50.95	Matt Patton; United States	3:51.25	Cristian Quintero; Venezuela	3:52.51
1500 m freestyle	Arthur Frayler; United States	15:19.59	Joseph Feely; United States	15:22.19	Juan Pereyra; Argentina	15:26.20
100 m backstroke	Thiago Pereira; Brazil	54.56	Eugene Godsoe; United States	54.61	Guilherme Guido; Brazil	54.81
200 m backstroke	Thiago Pereira; Brazil	1:57.19 GR, NR	Omar Pinzón; Colombia	1:58.31	Ryan Murphy; United States	1:58.50
100 m breaststroke	Felipe França Silva; Brazil	1:00.34	Felipe Lima; Brazil	1:00.99	Marcus Titus; United States	1:01.12
200 m breaststroke	Sean Mahoney; United States	2:11.62 GR	Clark Burckle; United States	2:12.60	Thiago Pereira; Brazil	2:13.58
100 m butterfly	Albert Subirats; Venezuela	52.37	Eugene Godsoe; United States	52.67	Chris Brady; United States	52.95
200 m butterfly	Leonardo de Deus; Brazil	1:57.92	Daniel Madwed; United States	1:58.52	Kaio Almeida; Brazil	1:58.78
200 m individual medley	Thiago Pereira; Brazil	1:58.07	Conor Dwyer; United States	1:58.64	Henrique Rodrigues; Brazil	2:03.41
400 m individual medley	Thiago Pereira; Brazil	4:16.68	Conor Dwyer; United States	4:18.22	Robert Margalis; United States	4:24.88
4 × 100 m freestyle relay	Brazil; César Cielo; Bruno Fratus; Nicholas Santos; Nicolas Oliveira; Gabriel Mangabeira*; Thiago Pereira*; Henrique Rodrigues*	3:14.65 GR	United States; William Copeland; Chris Brady; Bobby Savulich; Scot Robison; Eugene Godsoe*; Conor Dwyer*	3:15.62	Venezuela; Octavio Alesi; Crox Acuña; Cristian Quintero; Albert Subirats; Luis Rojas*; Roberto Gomez*; Daniele Tirabassi*	3:19.92
4 × 200 m freestyle relay	United States; Conor Dwyer; Scot Robison; Charlie Houchin; Matt Patton; Daniel Madwed*; Ryan Feeley*; Rex Tullius*; Robert Margalis*	7:15.07	Brazil; André Schultz; Nicolas Oliveira; Leonardo de Deus; Thiago Pereira; Giuliano Rocco*; Lucas Kanieski*; Diogo Yabe*	7:21.96	Venezuela; Daniele Tirabassi; Cristian Quintero; Crox Acuña; Marcos Lavado; Eddy Marin*; Ricardo Monasterio*; Alejandro Gomez*	7:23.41
4 × 100 m medley relay	Brazil; Guilherme Guido; Felipe França Silva; Gabriel Mangabeira; César Cielo; Thiago Pereira*; Felipe Lima*; Kaio Almeida*; Bruno Fratus*	3:34.58	United States; Eugene Godsoe; Marcus Titus; Chris Brady; Scot Robison; David Russell*; Kevin Swander*; Bobby Savulich*	3:37.17	Argentina; Federico Grabich; Lucas Peralta; Marcos Barale; Lucas Del Piccolo	3:44.51
10 km marathon	Richard Weinberger; Canada	1:57:31.0	Arthur Frayler; United States	1:57:31.3	Guillermo Bertola; Argentina	1:57:33.9

* Swimmers who participated in the heats only and received medals.

=== Women's events ===
Event	Gold		Silver		Bronze	
50 m freestyle	Lara Jackson; United States	25.09 GR	Graciele Herrmann; Brazil	25.23	Madison Kennedy; United States	25.24
100 m freestyle	Amanda Kendall; United States	54.75	Erika Erndl; United States	55.04	Arlene Semeco; Venezuela	55.43
200 m freestyle	Catherine Breed; United States	2:00.08	Chelsea Nauta; United States	2:00.62	Andreina Pinto; Venezuela	2:00.79
400 m freestyle	Gillian Ryan; United States	4:11.58	Andreina Pinto; Venezuela	4:11.81	Kristel Köbrich; Chile	4:13.31
800 m freestyle	Kristel Köbrich; Chile	8:34.71	Ashley Twichell; United States	8:38.38	Andreina Pinto; Venezuela	8:44.55
100 m backstroke	Rachel Bootsma; United States	1:00.37 GR	Elizabeth Pelton; United States	1:01.12	Fernanda González; Mexico	1:02.00
200 m backstroke	Elizabeth Pelton; United States	2:08.99 GR	Bonnie Brandon; United States	2:12.57	Fernanda González; Mexico	2:13.56
100 m breaststroke	Annie Chandler; United States	1:07.90	Ashley Wanland; United States	1:08.55	Ashley McGregor; Canada	1:08.96
200 m breaststroke	Ashley McGregor; Canada	2:28.04	Haley Spencer; United States	2:29.30	Michelle McKeehan; United States	2:30.51
100 m butterfly	Claire Donahue; United States	58.73	Daynara de Paula; Brazil	59.30	Elaine Breeden; United States	59.81
200 m butterfly	Kim Vandenberg; United States	2:10.54	Lyndsay De Paul; United States	2:12.34	Rita Medrano; Mexico	2:12.43
200 m I.M.	Julia Smit; United States	2:13.73	Alia Atkinson; Jamaica	2:14.75	Joanna Maranhão; Brazil	2:15.08
400 m I.M.	Julia Smit; United States	4:46.15	Joanna Maranhão; Brazil	4:46.33	Allysa Vavra; United States	4:48.05
4 × 100 m freestyle relay	United States; Madison Kennedy; Elizabeth Pelton; Amanda Kendall; Erika Erndl	3:40.66 GR	Brazil; Michelle Lenhardt; Flávia Delaroli; Tatiana Barbosa; Daynara de Paula; Graciele Herrmann*	3:44.62	Canada; Jennifer Beckberger; Caroline Lapierre; Ashley McGregor; Paige Schultz; Gabrielle Soucisse*	3:48.37
4 × 200 m freestyle relay	United States; Catherine Breed; Elizabeth Pelton; Chelsea Nauta; Amanda Kendall; Kim Vandenberg*; Erika Erndl*	8:01.18 GR	Brazil; Joanna Maranhão; Jéssica Cavalheiro; Manuella Lyrio; Tatiana Barbosa; Sarah Correa*; Gabriela Rocha*; Larissa Cieslak*; Thamy Ventorin*	8:09.89	Mexico; Liliana Ibáñez; Patricia Castañeda; Fernanda González; Susana Escobar; Martha Beltrán*; Rita Medrano*	8:12.19
4 × 100 m medley relay	United States; Rachel Bootsma; Annie Chandler; Claire Donahue; Amanda Kendall; Elizabeth Pelton*; Ashley Wanland*; Elaine Breeden*; Erika Erndl*	4:01.00 GR	Canada; Ashley McGregor; Gabrielle Soucisse; Erin Miller; Jennifer Beckberger; Brenna MacLean*; Kierra Smith*; Samantha Corea*; Caroline Lapierre*	4:07.04	Brazil; Fabíola Molina; Tatiane Sakemi; Daynara de Paula; Tatiana Barbosa	4:07.12
10 km marathon	Cecilia Biagioli; Argentina	2:04:11.5	Poliana Okimoto; Brazil	2:05:51.3	Christine Jennings; United States	2:05:52.2

* Swimmers who swam in preliminary heats and received medals.

== Medal standings ==
* Host nation (Mexico)

Rank	Nation	Gold	Silver	Bronze	Total
1	United States	18	19	9	46
2	Brazil	10	9	6	25
3	Canada	2	1	2	5
4	Venezuela	1	1	6	8
5	Cayman Islands	1	1	1	3
6	Argentina	1	0	3	4
7	Chile	1	0	1	2
8	Cuba	0	1	1	2
9	Colombia	0	1	0	1
9	Jamaica	0	1	0	1
11	Mexico*	0	0	4	4
12	Paraguay	0	0	1	1
Totals (12 entries)		34	34	34	102

The host country is highlighted in lavender blue

== Qualifying ==
On May 26, 2010, the qualification standards for the Swimming portion of the 2011 Pan Am Games were set.

- a B standard which qualifies up to one swimmer per event, or
- an A standard which qualifies up to two swimmers per event, where both swimmers must meet this faster standard.

The time standards for the 2011 Pan American Games were:

Men		Event	Women	
A standard (2 entries)	B standard (1 entry)	Event	A standard (2 entries)	B standard (1 entry)
23.1	23.8	50 freestyle	26.4	27.2
50.4	51.9	100 freestyle	57.6	59.3
1:51.6	1:54.7	200 freestyle	2:05.0	2:08.8
4:00.1	4:07.2	400 freestyle	4:19.9	4:27.7
N/A	N/A	800 freestyle	9:05.8	9:22.2
15:50.4	16:18.9	1500 freestyle	N/A	N/A
56.7	58.6	100 backstroke	1:05.3	1:07.3
2:04.1	2:07.8	200 backstroke	2:22.8	2:27.1
1:04.7	1:06.6	100 breaststroke	1:13.3	1:15.5
2:21.7	2:26.0	200 breaststroke	2:37.6	2:41.3
54.6	56.2	100 butterfly	1:03.7	1:05.6
2:02.0	2:05.7	200 butterfly	2:19.9	2:24.1
2:07.2	2:11.0	200 individual medley	2:25.7	2:30.1
4:34.2	4:41.5	400 individual medley	5:19.0	5:28.6
