= Swimming at the 2010 South American Games =

- Dates: March 23, 25 and 26-29

The swimming events at the 2010 South American Games were held from March 23, 25 and 26-29; and were grouped into two disciplines: (pool) swimming and open water swimming.

Events were contested at:

- Open water (4 events): a reservoir next to Guatapé, (just west of Medellín);
- Swimming (40 events): March 26–29 at the Complejo Acuatico (trans: "Aquatic Complex") in Medellín.

== Event schedule ==
=== Open Water schedule ===
- Tuesday, March 23: 5-kilometer race (5K)
- Thursday, March 25: 10-kilometer race (10K)

=== Pool finals schedule ===
Date	Thursday; March 26	Friday; March 27	Saturday; March 28	Sunday; March 29
E v e n t s	50 fly (M); 50 breast (W); 800 free (M); 400 free (W); 200 back (M); 100 fly (W); 100 breast (M); 200 IM (W); 200 free (M); 4x200 free relay (W)	50 fly (W); 50 breast (M); 800 free (W); 200 fly (M); 200 back (W); 400 free (M); 100 free (W); 100 back (M); 400 IM (W); 4x200 free relay (M)	50 free (M); 50 back (W); 1500 free (M); 200 breast (W); 100 fly (M); 200 free (W); 200 IM (M); 200 fly (W); 4x100 medley relay (M); 4x100 free relay (W)	50 free (W); 50 back (M); 1500 free (W); 200 breast (M); 100 back (W); 100 free (M); 100 breast (W); 400 IM (M); 4x100 medley relay (W); 4x100 free relay (M)

== Results ==
=== Men's events ===
Event	Gold		Silver		Bronze	
50 m freestyle	Crox Acuña; Venezuela	22.99	Nicolas Oliveira; Brazil	23.00	Federico Grabich; Argentina	23.10
100 m freestyle	Crox Acuña; Venezuela	50.29	Ben Hockin; Paraguay; Nicolas Oliveira; Brazil	50.50	not awarded	
200 m freestyle	Federico Grabich; Argentina	1:50.81	Ben Hockin; Paraguay	1:51.48	Nicolas Oliveira; Brazil	1:51.51
400 m freestyle	Alejandro Gómez; Venezuela	3:58.41 GR	Lucas Kanieski; Brazil	3:58.58	Julio Galofre; Colombia	3:58.78
800 m freestyle	Lucas Kanieski; Brazil	8:09.81	Luiz Arapiraca; Brazil	8:16.93	Alejandro Gómez; Venezuela	8:17.68
1500 m freestyle	Luiz Arapiraca; Brazil	15:41.91	Lucas Kanieski; Brazil	15:43.69	Alejandro Gómez; Venezuela	15:53.07
50 m backstroke	Guilherme Guido; Brazil	25.09	Federico Grabich; Argentina	25.69	Daniel Orzechowski; Brazil	26.05
100 m backstroke	Guilherme Guido; Brazil	55.14	Federico Grabich; Argentina	55.53	Albert Subirats; Venezuela	55.57
200 m backstroke	Leonardo de Deus; Brazil	2:02.00	Thiago Pereira; Brazil	2:02.13	Juan López Nieto; Colombia	2:06.36
50 m breaststroke	Felipe Silva; Brazil	27.90	João Gomes Jr. Brazil	28.06	Martin Melconian; Uruguay	28.88
100 m breaststroke	Felipe Silva; Brazil	1:02.87 GR	Jorge Murillo; Colombia	1:03.49	João Gomes Jr. Brazil	1:03.82
200 m breaststroke	Thiago Pereira; Brazil	2:16.89 GR	Jorge Murillo; Colombia	2:17.71	Rodrigo Frutos; Argentina	2:20.84
50 m butterfly	Albert Subirats; Venezuela	23.66	Glauber Silva; Brazil	24.22	Ben Hockin; Paraguay	24.33
100 m butterfly	Albert Subirats; Venezuela	52.86	Ben Hockin; Paraguay	54.90	Gustavo Daniel Paschetta; Argentina	54.99
200 m butterfly	Leonardo de Deus; Brazil	2:01.20 GR	Andres Montoya; Colombia	2:03.88	Andres Jose Gonzalez; Argentina	2:04.45
200 m I.M.	Thiago Pereira; Brazil	2:03.16 GR	Leopoldo Andara; Venezuela	2:08.27	Diego Bonilla; Colombia	2:08.61
400 m I.M.	Thiago Pereira; Brazil	4:28.79 GR	Esteban Enderica; Ecuador	4:30.41	Cristhian Orjuela; Colombia	4:35.24
4×100 m freestyle relay	Venezuela; Albert Subirats; Christian Quintero; Daniele Tirabassi; Crox Acuña	3:22.89 GR	Brazil; Nicolas Oliveira; Guilherme Roth; Rodrigo Castro; Thiago Pereira	3:24.56	Colombia; Juan Cambindo; Daniel Cuellar; Julio Galofre; Marco González	3:26.16
4×200 m freestyle relay	Venezuela; Daniele Tirabassi; Crox Acuña; Alejandro Gómez; Christian Quintero	7:29.12	Brazil; Thiago Pereira; Rodrigo Castro; Leonardo de Deus; Nicolas Oliveira	7:29.92	Colombia; Javier Molina; Mateo de Angulo; Juan David Pérez; Julio Galofre	7:38.55
4×100 m medley relay	Brazil; Guilherme Guido; Felipe Silva; Gabriel Mangabeira; Nicolas Oliveira	3:43.73 GR	Venezuela; Luis Rojas; Leopoldo Andara; Albert Subirats; Crox Acuña	3:46.78	Colombia; Juan David Pérez; Jorge Murillo; Juan López Nieto; Julio Galofre	3:46.88
5 km Open Water	Ivan Alejandro Ochoa; Ecuador	57:12.3	Allan do Carmo; Brazil	57:14.3	Damián Blaum; Argentina; Erwin Maldonado; Venezuela	57:16.4
10 km Open Water	Ivan Alejandro Ochoa; Ecuador	1:50:31.5	Erwin Maldonado; Venezuela	1:50:33.4	Damián Blaum; Argentina	1:50:35.1

=== Women's events ===
Event	Gold		Silver		Bronze	
50 m freestyle	Flavia Cazziolato; Brazil		Arlene Semeco; Venezuela		Daynara de Paula; Brazil	
100 m freestyle	Arlene Semeco; Venezuela		Tatiana Barbosa; Brazil		Nadia Soledad Colovini; Argentina	
200 m freestyle	Cecilia Biagioli; Argentina		Tatiana Barbosa; Brazil		Yanel Pinto; Venezuela	
400 m freestyle	Joanna Maranhão; Brazil		Kristel Köbrich; Chile		Cecilia Biagioli; Argentina	
800 m freestyle	Andreina Pinto; Venezuela		Kristel Köbrich; Chile		Joanna Maranhão; Brazil	
1500 m freestyle	Kristel Köbrich; Chile		Andreina Pinto; Venezuela		Yanel Pinto; Venezuela	
50 m backstroke	Fabíola Molina; Brazil		Jeserik Pinto; Venezuela		Carolina Colorado Henao; Colombia	
100 m backstroke	Fabíola Molina; Brazil		Carolina Colorado Henao; Colombia		Jeserik Pinto; Venezuela	
200 m backstroke	Fernanda Alvarenga; Brazil		Isabella Arcila; Colombia		Georgina Bardach; Argentina	
50 m breaststroke	Ana Carvalho; Brazil		Alessandra Marchioro; Brazil		Agustina De Giovanni; Argentina	
100 m breaststroke	Agustina De Giovanni; Argentina		Tatiane Sakemi; Brazil		Carolina Mussi; Brazil	
200 m breaststroke	Carolina Mussi; Brazil		Tatiane Sakemi; Brazil		Mijal Asis; Argentina	
50 m butterfly	Daynara de Paula; Brazil		Daniele Jesus; Brazil		Jeserik Pinto; Venezuela	
100 m butterfly	Daynara de Paula; Brazil		Carolina Colorado Henao; Colombia		Daiene Dias; Brazil	
200 m butterfly	Joanna Maranhão; Brazil		Andreina Pinto; Venezuela		Georgina Bardach; Argentina	
200 m I.M.	Joanna Maranhão; Brazil		Georgina Bardach; Argentina		Erika Stewart; Colombia	
400 m I.M.	Joanna Maranhão; Brazil		Larissa Cieslak; Brazil		Samantha Arévalo; Ecuador	
4×100 m freestyle relay	Brazil; Daynara de Paula; Flavia Cazziolato; Alessandra Marchioro; Tatiana Barbosa		Argentina; Manuela Morano; Cecilia Biagioli; Aixa Jazmin Triay; Nadia Colovini		Venezuela; Jeserik Pinto; Ximena Vilar; Yanel Pinto; Arlene Semeco	
4×200 m freestyle relay	Brazil; Tatiana Barbosa; Daynara de Paula; Sarah Correa; Joanna Maranhão		Argentina; Nadia Colovini; Georgina Bardach; Virginia Bardach; Cecilia Biagioli		Venezuela; Yanel Pinto; Elimar Barrios; Darneyis Orozco; Andreina Pinto	
4×100 m medley relay	Brazil; Fabíola Molina; Tatiane Sakemi; Daynara de Paula; Tatiana Barbosa	4:13.97	Argentina; Cecilia Bertoncello; Agustina de Giovanni; Georgina Bardach; Nadia Colovini	4:18.10	Colombia; Carolina Colorado Henao; Monica Álvarez; María Clara Sosa; Erika Stewart	4:20.53
5 km Open Water	Ana Marcela Cunha; Brazil; Andreina Pinto; Venezuela	1:01:56.0	not awarded		Nataly Rosalta Calle; Ecuador	1:01:59.0
10 km Open Water	Andreina Pinto; Venezuela	1:58:10.1	Ana Marcela Cunha; Brazil	1:58:10.3	Antonella Bogarin; Argentina	1:58:15.5

== Medal standings ==
Rank	Nation	Gold	Silver	Bronze	Total
1	Brazil (BRA)	28	19	7	54
2	Venezuela (VEN)	11	7	10	28
3	Argentina (ARG)	3	6	13	22
4	Ecuador (ECU)	2	1	2	5
5	Chile (CHI)	1	2	0	3
6	Colombia (COL)	0	7	9	16
7	Paraguay (PAR)	0	3	1	4
8	Uruguay (URU)	0	0	1	1
Totals (8 entries)		45	45	43	133
