= Diogo Yabe =

Brazilian swimmer (born 1980)

Personal information
- Full name: Diogo de Oliveira Yabe
- Nationality: Brazil
- Born: August 8, 1980 (age 45) Londrina, Paraná, Brazil
- Height: 1.86 m (6 ft 1 in)
- Weight: 80 kg (176 lb)

Sport
- Sport: Swimming
- Strokes: Medley
Medal record
Men's swimming
Representing Brazil
Pan American Games
Silver medal – second place	2011 Guadalajara	4x200 m freestyle
South American Games
Gold medal – first place	2006 Buenos Aires	400 m medley
Silver medal – second place	2006 Buenos Aires	200 m medley
Silver medal – second place	2006 Buenos Aires	4x100 m freestyle
Bronze medal – third place	2006 Buenos Aires	4x200 m freestyle

Diogo de Oliveira Yabe (born August 8, 1980, in Londrina, Paraná, Brazil), is a Brazilian competitive swimmer who specializes in medley events.

Married with Fabíola Molina.

He swam at the 2002 Pan Pacific Swimming Championships, where he finished 12th in the 200-metre individual medley.

In May 2003, Yabe achieved fame for breaking the Ricardo Prado's South American record in the 200-metre individual medley, a record that stood since 1983.

At the 2003 World Aquatics Championships, Yabe was in the 200-metre individual medley, but was disqualified.

Yabe was at the 2003 Pan American Games in Santo Domingo, where he ranked 6th place in the 200-metre individual medley and in the 400-metre individual medley.

Participated in the 2004 Summer Olympics in the 200-metre individual medley, where he earned a 26th-place finish.

At the 2006 South American Games in Buenos Aires, Yabe won a gold medal in the 400-metre individual medley, two silver medals in the 200-metre individual medley and 4×100-metre freestyle, and a bronze medal in the 4×200-metre freestyle.

At the 2007 Pan American Games in Rio de Janeiro, ranked 4th in the 400-metre individual medley, and 8th in the 200-metre individual medley

He was at the 2010 Pan Pacific Swimming Championships in Irvine, where he finished 14th in the 200-metre individual medley, and 15th in the 400-metre individual medley.

He was at the 2010 FINA World Swimming Championships (25 m), where he finished 25th place in the 200-metre individual medley, and in 17th place in the 400-metre individual medley.

As one of the representatives of Brazil in the 2011 Pan American Games in Guadalajara, won the silver medal in the 4×200-metre freestyle by participate at heats.

At the 2011 Military World Games, held in Rio de Janeiro, Diogo won the gold medal in the 200-metre individual medley and in the 400-metre individual medley.
