= Daniel Orzechowski =

Brazilian swimmer (born 1985)

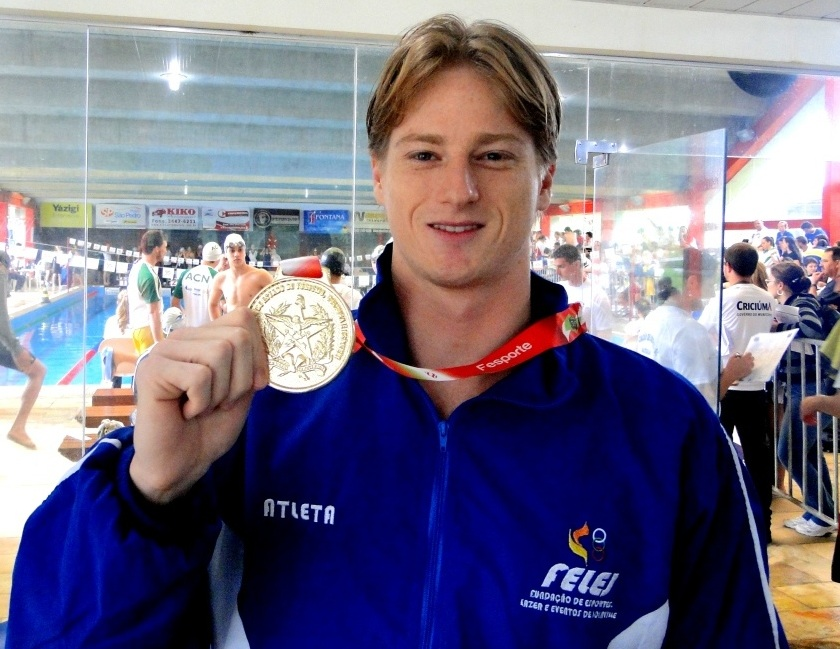

Personal information
- Full name: Daniel Orzechowski
- Nationality: Brazil
- Born: June 1, 1985 (age 41) Joinville, Santa Catarina, Brazil
- Height: 1.90 m (6 ft 3 in)
- Weight: 87 kg (192 lb)

Sport
- Sport: Swimming
- Strokes: Backstroke
Medal record
Men's swimming
Representing Brazil
South American Games
Silver medal – second place	2006 Buenos Aires	100 m backstroke
Silver medal – second place	2006 Buenos Aires	4x100 m medley
Bronze medal – third place	2006 Buenos Aires	50 m backstroke
Bronze medal – third place	2010 Medellín	50 m backstroke
South American Championships
Gold medal – first place	2012 Belém	50 m backstroke

Daniel Orzechowski (born 1 June 1985) is a Brazilian swimmer who has competed at World and Olympic level.

At the 2006 South American Games, he got the silver medal in the 100-metre backstroke, in the 4×100-metre medley, and bronze in the 50-metre backstroke.

At the 2010 South American Games, Daniel won the bronze medal in the 50-metre backstroke.

In April 2012, at the Maria Lenk Trophy, he broke the South American record of 50-metre backstroke, with the best time in the world at that stage of the year, 24.44 seconds.

He qualified for the 2012 Summer Olympics in London, in the 100-metre backstroke. Daniel finished in 28th place in the heats, failing to make the semi-finals.

At the 2012 FINA World Swimming Championships (25 m) in Istanbul, he reached the final of the 50-metre backstroke, placing 7th. He also ranked 18th in the 100-metre backstroke. Daniel also competed for the Brazilian 4×100-metre medley relay team, which qualified for the finals, finishing in 4th place.

At the 2013 World Aquatics Championships in Barcelona, he finished 6th in the 50-metre backstroke final and 21st in the 100-metre backstroke.
