= Geijo =

Geijo is a Spanish surname. Notable people with the name include:

- Alexandre Geijo (born 1982), Swiss-Spanish footballer
- Pilar Geijo (born 1984), Argentine swimmer
