= Swimming at the 2010 South American Games – Women's 100 metre breaststroke =

The Women's 100m breaststroke event at the 2010 South American Games was held on March 29, with the heats at 10:54 and the Final at 18:20.

== Medalists ==
Gold	Silver	Bronze
Agustina de Giovanni; Argentina	Tatiane Sakemi; Brazil	Carolina Mussi; Brazil

== Records ==
Standing records prior to the 2010 South American Games
World record	Jessica Hardy (USA)	1:04.45	Federal Way, United States	7 August 2009
Competition Record	Javiera Salcedo (ARG)	1:12.24	Buenos Aires, Argentina	18 November 2006
South American record	Tatiane Sakemi (BRA)	1:07.67	Rio de Janeiro, Brazil	9 May 2009

== Results ==
=== Heats ===
Rank	Heat	Lane	Athlete	Result	Notes
1	2	5	Agustina de Giovanni (ARG)	1:10.37	Q CR
2	1	4	Tatiane Sakemi (BRA)	1:12.87	Q
3	2	4	Carolina Mussi (BRA)	1:13.17	Q
4	2	2	Mercedes Toledo (VEN)	1:14.87	Q
5	1	5	Mijal Asis (ARG)	1:16.07	Q
6	2	3	Daniela Victoria (VEN)	1:16.66	Q
7	1	3	Monica Álvarez (COL)	1:16.95	Q
8	2	6	Ashley Bransford (PER)	1:18.65	Q
9	1	6	Laura Galarza (COL)	1:19.16	
10	2	7	Camila Isabel Espinosa (ECU)	1:20.17	
11	1	7	Patricia Mariana San Martin (PER)	1:20.62	
12	1	2	Raysa Malu Ruiz (PER)	1:20.93	
13	1	1	Carla Silvana Torres (ECU)	1:21.54	
14	1	8	Nilshaira Isenia (AHO)	1:22.10	
15	2	8	LujanAmarilla Vargas (PAR)	1:23.59	
16	2	1	Maria Laura Britez (PAR)	1:27.68	

=== Final ===
Rank	Lane	Athlete	Result	Notes
1st place, gold medalist(s)	4	Agustina de Giovanni (ARG)	1:10.00	CR
2nd place, silver medalist(s)	5	Tatiane Sakemi (BRA)	1:12.47	
3rd place, bronze medalist(s)	3	Carolina Mussi (BRA)	1:12.78	
4	1	Monica Álvarez (COL)	1:12.86	
5	7	Daniela Victoria (VEN)	1:14.79	
6	6	Mercedes Toledo (VEN)	1:15.10	
7	2	Mijal Asis (ARG)	1:15.78	
8	8	Ashley Bransford (ARU)	1:18.17	
