= Sergio Ferreyra =

Argentine swimmer (born 1977)

Personal information
- Full name: Sergio Andrés Ferreyra
- National team: Argentina
- Born: 21 May 1977 (age 49)
- Height: 1.82 m (6 ft 0 in)
- Weight: 80 kg (176 lb)

Sport
- Sport: Swimming
- Strokes: Breaststroke
- Club: Regatas Corrientes
- Coach: Sergio Oscar Sainz
Medal record
Men's swimming
Representing Argentina
South American Games
Silver medal – second place	2006 Buenos Aires	200 m breaststroke
Bronze medal – third place	2006 Buenos Aires	100 m breaststroke

Sergio Andrés Ferreyra (born May 21, 1977) is an Argentine former swimmer, who specialized in breaststroke events. He is a multiple-time Argentine record holder, and a two-time medalist in the breaststroke (both 100 and 200 m) at the 2006 South American Games in Buenos Aires. He is also a member of Club Regatas Corrientes, and is coached and trained by Sergio Oscar Sainz.

Ferreyra made his first Argentine team, as a 23-year-old, at the 2000 Summer Olympics in Sydney, competing in two swimming events. In the 100 m breaststroke, Ferreyra rounded out the fifth heat to last place and fifty-third overall by less than 0.19 of a second behind Belarus' Aliaksandr Hukau in 1:05.75. He also placed eighteenth as a member of the Argentine team in the 4 × 100 m medley relay (3:43.61). Teaming with Eduardo Germán Otero, Pablo Martín Abal, and José Meolans, Ferreyra swam a breaststroke leg in a split of 1:02.73.

Eight years after competing in his last Olympics, Ferreyra qualified for his second Argentine team as a 31-year-old at the 2008 Summer Olympics in Beijing. He cleared FINA B-standard entry times of 1.03.06 (100 m breaststroke) and 2.18.01 (200 m breaststroke) from the national trials. In the 100 m breaststroke, Ferreyra challenged seven other swimmers on the third heat, including three-time Olympians Malick Fall of Senegal and Alwin de Prins of Luxembourg. He cruised to sixth place and fifty-second overall by a hundredth of a second (0.01) behind de Prins, outside his record time of 1:03.65. In his second event, 200 m breaststroke, Ferreyra recorded a slowest time of 2:20.10 on the first heat, finishing last out of 52 swimmers in the preliminaries.
