= Larissa Cieslak =

Brazilian swimmer (born 1987)

Personal information
- Full name: Larissa Freitas Cieslak
- Born: October 26, 1987 (age 38) Sobradinho, Federal District, Brazil
- Height: 1.70 m (5 ft 7 in)
- Weight: 68 kg (150 lb)

Sport
- Sport: Swimming
- Strokes: Freestyle
Medal record
Women's swimming
Representing Brazil
Pan American Games
Silver medal – second place	2011 Guadalajara	4x200 m freestyle
South American Games
Silver medal – second place	2010 Medellín	400 m medley
Bronze medal – third place	2006 Buenos Aires	200 m medley

Larissa Freitas Cieslak (born October 26, 1987) is a Brazilian competitive swimmer.

In 2006 South American Games, she won a bronze medal in the 200-metre individual medley.

At 20 years old, in 2007 Pan American Games in Rio de Janeiro, she went to the 400-metre individual medley final, finishing in 8th place.

In 2010 South American Games, she won a silver medal in the 400-metre individual medley.

She was at the 2010 Pan Pacific Swimming Championships in Irvine, where she finished 15th in the 400-metre individual medley, and 26th in the 200-metre individual medley.

Integrating Brazil national delegation that disputed the 2011 Pan American Games in Guadalajara, Mexico, she won the silver medal in 4×200-metre freestyle by participating at heats. She was also ranked 12th in the 400-metre individual medley and 13th in the 200-metre individual medley.
