= Carolina Colorado Henao =

Colombian swimmer (born 1987)

Personal information
- Full name: Carolina Colorado Henao
- Nationality: Colombia
- Born: 7 September 1987 (age 38) Caldas, Colombia
- Height: 1.70 m (5 ft 7 in)
- Weight: 64 kg (141 lb)

Sport
- Sport: Swimming
- Strokes: Backstroke, Butterfly
Medal record
Women's swimming
Representing Colombia
South American Games
Gold medal – first place	2006 B.Aires	50 m backstroke
Gold medal – first place	2006 B.Aires	100 m backstroke
Gold medal – first place	2014 Santiago	100 m backstroke
Gold medal – first place	2014 Santiago	200 m backstroke
Silver medal – second place	2010 Medellín	100 m backstroke
Silver medal – second place	2010 Medellín	100 m butterfly
Silver medal – second place	2014 Santiago	100 m butterfly
Bronze medal – third place	2010 Medellín	50 m backstroke
Bronze medal – third place	2010 Medellín	4x100 m medley
Bronze medal – third place	2014 Santiago	4x200 m freestyle
Bronze medal – third place	2014 Santiago	4x100 m medley
Central American and Caribbean Games
Silver medal – second place	2014 Veracruz	100 m backstroke
Silver medal – second place	2014 Veracruz	200 m backstroke
Silver medal – second place	2014 Veracruz	50 m butterfly
Silver medal – second place	2014 Veracruz	4x100 m freestyle
Silver medal – second place	2014 Veracruz	4x100 m medley
Bronze medal – third place	2006 Cartagena	100 m backstroke
Bronze medal – third place	2010 Mayagüez	50 m backstroke
Bronze medal – third place	2014 Veracruz	100 m butterfly

Carolina Colorado Henao (born 7 September 1987 in Caldas, Antioquia, Colombia) is an Olympic and national record-holding swimmer from Colombia. She swam for Colombia at the 2008 and 2012 Olympics.
