= Jader Souza =

Brazilian swimmer (born 1982)

Personal information
- Full name: Jader José da Silva Souza
- Nationality: Brazil
- Born: March 13, 1982 (age 44) Macapá, Amapá, Brazil
- Height: 1.93 m (6 ft 4 in)
- Weight: 90 kg (198 lb)

Sport
- Sport: Swimming
- Strokes: Freestyle
Medal record
Men's swimming
Representing Brazil
Pan American Games
Gold medal – first place	2003 Santo Domingo	4×100 m free
South American Games
Gold medal – first place	2006 Buenos Aires	50 m butterfly
Silver medal – second place	2006 Buenos Aires	4x100 m free
Bronze medal – third place	2006 Buenos Aires	50 m free

Jader José da Silva Souza (born March 13, 1982, in Macapá) is a Brazilian swimmer.

He started swimming at age 6, when he asked his mother to enter in a swimming school. Away from the major centres of the national sport, Jader has always struggled to participate in competitions and consequently improve his performance. In 2002, discouraged with the situation in his hometown, dropped everything to pursue a dream in Brasilia. But then he began to reap the rewards of their dedication.

He was at the 2003 World Aquatics Championships in Barcelona, where he finished 31st in the 50-metre freestyle, 30th in the 100-metre freestyle and 12th in the 4×100-metre freestyle.

At the 2003 Pan American Games, in Santo Domingo, Jader won the gold medal in the 4×100-metre freestyle, along with Gustavo Borges, Fernando Scherer and Carlos Jayme. He also finished 6th in the 50-metre freestyle, and 5th in the 100-metre freestyle.

Jader competed in the 2004 Summer Olympics, in Athens, where he finished 12th in the 4×100-metre freestyle, 15th in the 4×100-metre medley, and 33rd in the 100-metre freestyle. In the 4×100-metre freestyle, the Brazilian legend Gustavo Borges said goodbye to swimming at the age of 31.

After the Olympics, he lost his sponsorship and stopped swimming. However, he returned in 2005.

At the 2006 South American Games held in Buenos Aires, Souza won the gold medal in the 50-metre butterfly , the silver medal in the 4×100-metre freestyle, and the bronze medal in the 50-metre freestyle.

In January 2009, he retired from professional swimming.
