= Eduardo Germán Otero =

Argentine swimmer (born 1980)

Personal information
- Full name: Eduardo Germán Otero
- National team: Argentina
- Born: 4 February 1980 (age 46) Necochea, Buenos Aires, Argentina
- Height: 1.85 m (6 ft 1 in)
- Weight: 85 kg (187 lb)

Sport
- Sport: Swimming
- Strokes: Backstroke, butterfly
- Club: CN Rio Plata
- Coach: Marcelo Quaglia
Medal record
Men's swimming
Representing Argentina
South American Games
Gold medal – first place	2002 Rio de Janeiro	50 m backstroke
Gold medal – first place	2006 Buenos Aires	50 m backstroke
Gold medal – first place	2006 Buenos Aires	4×100 m freestyle

Eduardo Germán Otero (born February 4, 1980) is an Argentine former swimmer, who specialized in backstroke and butterfly events. He is a three-time Olympian, a multiple-time national record holder, and a two-time champion for the 50 m backstroke at the South American Games. He is also a member of Club Nadadores del Rio Plata, and is coached and trained by Marcelo "Yuri" Quaglia.

Otero's Olympic debut came at the 2000 Summer Olympics in Sydney. There, he failed to reach the top 16 in any of his individual events, finishing fortieth in the 100 m backstroke (58.09), and thirty-fourth in the 200 m backstroke (2:05.51). He also placed eighteenth as a member of the Argentine team in the 4 × 100 m medley relay (3:43.61). Teaming with Sergio Ferreyra, Pablo Martín Abal, and José Meolans, Otero swam a backstroke leg with a split of 58.00 seconds.

On his second Olympic appearance in Athens 2004, Otero decided to drop his specialty event, the 200 m backstroke, and experiment with the 100 m butterfly. He also qualified for the 100 m backstroke by clearing a FINA B-standard entry time of 56.36 from the South American Championships in Maldonado, Uruguay. Otero repeated his luck from Sydney, as he rounded out to last place in heat three and thirty-third overall with a time of 57.28. In the 100 m butterfly, Otero placed forty-fourth on the morning's preliminaries. Swimming in the same heat, he posted a lifetime best of 55.24 to earn a fourth spot by nearly half a second (0.50) behind winner Jeong Doo-Hee of South Korea.

Eight years after competing in his first Olympics, Otero qualified for his third Argentine team as a 28-year-old at the 2008 Summer Olympics in Beijing. He achieved an Olympic B-cut of 56.38 seconds from the national trials in Buenos Aires. He challenged seven other swimmers on the third heat, including fellow three-time Olympian and former finalist Örn Arnarson of Iceland. Otero raced to seventh place by 0.19 of a second behind Ukraine's Oleksandr Isakov in 56.74. Otero failed to advance into the semifinals, as he matched his position from Sydney in the preliminaries.
