= Fernanda Alvarenga =

Brazilian swimmer (born 1986)

Personal information
- Full name: Fernanda Nunes Alvarenga
- Born: August 20, 1986 (age 39) Brasília, DF, Brazil

Sport
- Sport: Swimming
- Strokes: Backstroke
Medal record
Women's swimming
Representing Brazil
South American Games
Gold medal – first place	2010 Medellín	200m backstroke
Bronze medal – third place	2006 Buenos Aires	50m backstroke
Bronze medal – third place	2006 Buenos Aires	100m backstroke

Fernanda Nunes Alvarenga (born August 20, 1986) is a Brazilian competitive swimmer.

At the 2006 South American Games, she obtained the bronze medal in the 50-metre backstroke and 100-metre backstroke.

At the 2007 Pan American Games, in Rio de Janeiro, Alvarenga won bronze in the 4×100-metre medley by participate in heats. Subsequently, this result was impeached due to Rebeca Gusmao's doping. She also attended the 100-metre backstroke, where she went to the semifinal, but at her battery, came in 6th place and got no vacancy to the finals, finishing in 12th place overall. Alvarenga was also in the 200-metre backstroke, where she went to the semifinals, finishing 4th on her battery and got no time to qualify to the final.

On September 4, 2008, she broke the Brazilian record in the 200-metre backstroke (long course), with a time of 2:15.43. On May 7, 2009, she broke the South American record in the 200-metre backstroke (long course), making 2:12.32. Improved by more than two seconds her own record, 2:14.88 made in December 2008.

At the 2010 South American Games, she obtained the gold medal in the 200-metre backstroke.

She was at the 2010 Pan Pacific Swimming Championships in Irvine, where she finished 19th in the 50-metre backstroke, 23rd in the 100-metre backstroke, and 23rd in the 200-metre backstroke.

Integrating Brazilian national delegation that disputed the 2011 Pan American Games in Guadalajara, Alvarenga was at the 200-metre backstroke final, finishing in 8th place.
