= Pilar Geijo =

Argentine swimmer (born 1984)

Personal information
- Born: September 19, 1984 (age 41) Buenos Aires, Argentina

Sport
- Sport: Swimming
Medal record
Representing Argentina
South American Games
Silver medal – second place	2006 Buenos Aires	5km open water
Silver medal – second place	2006 Buenos Aires	10km open water

Pilar Geijo (born 19 September 1984 in Buenos Aires) is a Marathon swimmer from Argentina. She has won most of the world's greatest ultra-marathon swimming competitions: the 2010 Traversée Internationale du Lac Memphrémagog (34K event), the 2011 Maratona del Golfo Capri Napoli Marathon (36K), the 2010 16K FINA Open Water Swimming Grand Prix in Sumidero Canyon in Mexico, and the longest race in the world, the 88K Hernandarias-Parana FINA Grand Prix event (88K) in Argentina. She has won the FINA Grand Prix circuit in 2010 and 2011.
