= Yamilé Bahamonde =

Ecuadorian swimmer (born 1987)

Personal information
- Full name: Loren Yamilé Bahamonde Cabello
- National team: Ecuador
- Born: 4 June 1987 (age 39) Guayaquil, Ecuador
- Height: 1.72 m (5 ft 8 in)
- Weight: 66 kg (146 lb)

Sport
- Sport: Swimming
- Strokes: Freestyle, butterfly
- Club: Federación Provincial de Guayas
- Coach: Rafael Herbas
Medal record
Women's swimming
Representing Ecuador
South American Games
Bronze medal – third place	2002 Belém	50 m freestyle
Bronze medal – third place	2006 Buenos Aires	50 m freestyle
Bronze medal – third place	2006 Buenos Aires	50 m butterfly

Loren Yamilé Bahamonde Cabello (born June 4, 1987) is an Ecuadorian swimmer, who specialized in freestyle and butterfly events. She represented her nation Ecuador at the 2008 Summer Olympics, and has won a career total of three bronze medals in a major international competition, spanning the two editions of the South American Games (2002 and 2006). Moreover, she collected a total of sixteen national records in three freestyle events (50, 100, and 200).

Bahamonde competed for the Ecuadorian squad in the women's 50 m freestyle at the 2008 Summer Olympics in Beijing. Leading up to the Games, she cleared a FINA B-standard entry time of 26.32 from the Speedo Grand Challenge in Irvine, California, United States. Swimming in heat six, Bahamonde touched out Christel Simms of the Philippines to snatch a third spot by a tenth-second deficit (0.10), in a time of 26.54 seconds. Bahamonde failed to advance into the semifinals, as she shared a forty-fourth-place tie with Hong Kong's Elaine Chan in the prelims.
