= Luiz Arapiraca =

Brazilian swimmer (born 1987)

Personal information
- Full name: Luiz Rogério Lima Arapiraca
- Nationality: Brazil
- Born: 26 December 1987 (age 38) Feira de Santana, Bahia, Brazil
- Height: 1.77 m (5 ft 10 in)
- Weight: 72 kg (159 lb)

Sport
- Sport: Swimming
- Strokes: Freestyle
Medal record
Men's swimming
Representing Brazil
South American Games
Gold medal – first place	2006 Buenos Aires	800 m freestyle
Gold medal – first place	2006 Buenos Aires	1500 m freestyle
Gold medal – first place	2010 Medellín	1500 m freestyle
Silver medal – second place	2010 Medellín	800 m freestyle
Bronze medal – third place	2006 Buenos Aires	4×200 m freestyle

Luiz Rogério Lima Arapiraca (born 26 December 1987 in Feira de Santana) is a Brazilian competitive swimmer.

Arapiraca won the gold medal in the 1500-metre freestyle and the bronze medal in the 400-metre freestyle Juvenile B, at the 2005 South American Youth Championships.

At the 2006 South American Games, he won the gold medal in the 800-metre freestyle, in the 1500-metre freestyle, and bronze in the 4×200-metre freestyle

Arapiraca competed at the 2007 Pan American Games, in Rio de Janeiro, where he went to the 1500-metre freestyle final, finishing in fifth place.

In 2009, at the Maria Lenk Aquatic Center, Arapiraca distinguished himself by breaking two old Brazilian swimming records: Luiz Lima's 1500-metre freestyle record, that existed 11 years ago, and Djan Madruga's 800-metre freestyle record, which lingered since 1980, and finally fell after 29 years.

At the 2009 Jose Finkel Trophy, he broke the South American record of Venezuelan Ricardo Monasterio, 15:15.05, with a time of 15:13.13.

He was at the 2010 South American Games, where he earned the gold medal in the 1500-metre freestyle, and silver in the 800-metre freestyle

He was at the 2010 Pan Pacific Swimming Championships in Irvine, where he finished 20th in the 800-metre freestyle, and 17th in the 1500-metre freestyle.

On 3 May 2011, Arapiraca broke again the South American record of the 1500-metre freestyle, with a time of 15:12.69.

At the 2011 Pan American Games, he finished 13th in the 1500-metre freestyle.

In 2012, Arapiraca became the champion of the Travessia dos Fortes. He had already won the race in 2010.

Arapiraca classified to participate in the 5 km marathon swimming at the 2013 World Aquatics Championships in Barcelona. He finished 30th in the race.
