= Andreina Pinto =

Venezuelan swimmer (born 1991)

Personal information
- Full name: Andreina del Valle Pinto Pérez
- Nationality: Venezuela
- Born: 10 September 1991 (age 34) Maracay, Aragua
- Height: 1.78 m (5 ft 10 in)
- Weight: 68 kg (150 lb)
- Spouse: Wilfredo Mejia

Sport
- Sport: Swimming
Medal record
Pan American Games
| Silver medal – second place | 2011 Guadalajara | 400 m freestyle |
| Silver medal – second place | 2015 Toronto | 400 m freestyle |
| Bronze medal – third place | 2011 Guadalajara | 200 m freestyle |
| Bronze medal – third place | 2011 Guadalajara | 800 m freestyle |
| Bronze medal – third place | 2015 Toronto | 800 m freestyle |
South American Games
| Gold medal – first place | 2010 Medellín | 800 m freestyle |
| Gold medal – first place | 2010 Medellín | 5 km marathon |
| Gold medal – first place | 2010 Medellín | 10 km marathon |
| Gold medal – first place | 2014 Santiago | 200 m freestyle |
| Gold medal – first place | 2014 Santiago | 400 m freestyle |
| Gold medal – first place | 2014 Santiago | 800 m freestyle |
| Gold medal – first place | 2014 Santiago | 200 m butterfly |
| Gold medal – first place | 2014 Santiago | 400 m medley |
| Silver medal – second place | 2006 B.Aires | 200 m butterfly |
| Silver medal – second place | 2010 Medellín | 1500 m freestyle |
| Silver medal – second place | 2010 Medellín | 200 m butterfly |
| Silver medal – second place | 2014 Santiago | 4x100 m freestyle |
| Silver medal – second place | 2014 Santiago | 4x200 m freestyle |
| Bronze medal – third place | 2006 B.Aires | 4x200 m freestyle |
| Bronze medal – third place | 2010 Medellín | 100 m backstroke |
| Bronze medal – third place | 2010 Medellín | 4x200 m freestyle |
Central American and Caribbean Games
| Gold medal – first place | 2010 Mayagüez | 200 m freestyle |
| Gold medal – first place | 2010 Mayagüez | 400 m freestyle |
| Gold medal – first place | 2010 Mayagüez | 800 m freestyle |
| Gold medal – first place | 2010 Mayagüez | 4x200 m freestyle |
| Gold medal – first place | 2014 Veracruz | 200 m freestyle |
| Gold medal – first place | 2014 Veracruz | 400 m freestyle |
| Gold medal – first place | 2014 Veracruz | 800 m freestyle |
| Gold medal – first place | 2014 Veracruz | 200 m butterfly |
| Gold medal – first place | 2014 Veracruz | 200 m medley |
| Gold medal – first place | 2014 Veracruz | 400 m medley |
| Silver medal – second place | 2006 Cartagena | 4x200 m freestyle |
| Silver medal – second place | 2010 Mayagüez | 1500 m freestyle |
| Bronze medal – third place | 2006 Cartagena | 800 m freestyle |
| Bronze medal – third place | 2006 Cartagena | 200 m butterfly |
| Bronze medal – third place | 2010 Mayagüez | 200 m butterfly |
| Bronze medal – third place | 2014 Veracruz | 4x100 m freestyle |

Andreina del Valle Pinto Pérez (born 10 September 1991) is an Olympic and National Record holding swimmer from Venezuela. She swam for Venezuela at the 2008 Olympics.

== Career ==
She also swam at the:

- 2007 World Championships
- 2007 Pan American Games
- 2008 Open Water Worlds
- 2009 World Championships
- 2010 Central American and Caribbean Games

At the 2009 World Championships, she swam to new Venezuelan Records in the 200, 400, and 1500 free (2:02.15, 4:11.29, and 16:22.29). The 200 free record came in leading off Venezuela's 4x200 Free Relay, which also lowered the national record.

At the 2008 Olympics, she set the Venezuelan Record in the 800 free at 8:30.30; and she also holds the national mark in the 200 fly (2:14.74).

Pinto was named the flag bearer for the Venezuela delegation at the 2011 Pan American Games.
