= Ben Hockin =

British-Paraguayan swimmer (born 1986)

Benjamin Hockin OLY
Personal information
- Full name: Benjamin Thomas Hockin Brusquetti
- Nickname: Benji
- National team: Great Britain (before 2008); Paraguay (since 2010)
- Born: 27 September 1986 (age 39) Barranquilla, Colombia
- Height: 2.05 m (6 ft 9 in)
- Weight: 92 kg (203 lb)

Sport
- Sport: Swimming
- Strokes: Freestyle
- Club: Swansea Performance
Medal record
Representing Paraguay
Pan American Games
Bronze medal – third place	2011 Guadalajara	200 m freestyle
South American Games
Silver medal – second place	2010 Medellín	100 m freestyle
Silver medal – second place	2010 Medellín	200 m freestyle
Silver medal – second place	2010 Medellín	100 m butterfly
Bronze medal – third place	2010 Medellín	50 m butterfly
Bronze medal – third place	2018 Cochabamba	200 m freestyle
South American Championships
Gold medal – first place	2012 Belém	200 m freestyle
Gold medal – first place	2014 Mar del Plata	200 m freestyle
Gold medal – first place	2014 Mar del Plata	50 m butterfly
Gold medal – first place	2018 Trujillo	50 m butterfly
Silver medal – second place	2012 Belém	4×100 m medley
Silver medal – second place	2016 Asunción	50 m butterfly
Silver medal – second place	2016 Asunción	4×100 m mixed medley
Bronze medal – third place	2012 Belém	100 m butterfly
Bronze medal – third place	2014 Mar del Plata	100 m freestyle
Bronze medal – third place	2014 Mar del Plata	4×100 m freestyle
Bronze medal – third place	2014 Mar del Plata	4×200 m freestyle
Bronze medal – third place	2018 Trujillo	100 m freestyle

Benjamin Hockin Brusquetti (born 27 September 1986) is an Olympic freestyle swimmer who has swum internationally for both Great Britain and Paraguay (his father is British, his mother is Paraguayan).

Hockin represented Great Britain at the 2008 Summer Olympics in the 4 × 100 m freestyle relay swimming events, where his team finished eighth.

He swam for Paraguay at the 2010 South American Games, where he won 3 silver medals and a bronze medal. However, Hockin did not follow the proper steps to switch his sport nationality and has been banned for one year (retroactive to 23 May 2010).

In September 2011, Hockin was named the flag bearer for Paraguayan team at the 2011 Pan American Games in Guadalajara, Mexico.

At the 2012 Summer Olympics, he was Paraguay's flagbearer and competed in the 100 and 200 m freestyle and the 100 m butterfly.

He competed again in the 2016 Summer Olympics held in Rio de Janeiro in the 100 m freestyle category, and finished 44th.

Olympic Games
Preceded by Víctor Fatecha	Flagbearer for Paraguay; London 2012	Succeeded by Julia Marino
