= Arlene Semeco =

Venezuelan swimmer (born 1984)

Personal information
- Full name: Arlene Iradie Semeco Arismendi
- Nationality: VEN
- Born: January 11, 1984 (age 42) Caracas, Venezuela
- Height: 1.75 m (5 ft 9 in)
- Weight: 63 kg (139 lb)

Sport
- Club: Coral Springs Swim Club; South Florida Aquatic Club; Alabama Crimson Tide
Medal record
Women's swimming
Representing Venezuela
Pan American Games
| Gold medal – first place | 2007 Rio de Janeiro | 50 m freestyle |
| Gold medal – first place | 2007 Rio de Janeiro | 100 m freestyle |
| Bronze medal – third place | 2011 Guadalajara | 100 m freestyle |
Central American and Caribbean Games
| Bronze medal – third place | 2010 Mayagüez | 100 m freestyle |
South American Games
| Gold medal – first place | 2002 Belém | 50 m freestyle |
| Gold medal – first place | 2002 Belém | 100 m freestyle |
| Gold medal – first place | 2006 Buenos Aires | 50 m freestyle |
| Gold medal – first place | 2006 Buenos Aires | 100 m freestyle |
| Gold medal – first place | 2006 Buenos Aires | 4x100 m medley |
| Gold medal – first place | 2010 Medellín | 100 m freestyle |
| Silver medal – second place | 2002 Belém | 4x100 m free |
| Silver medal – second place | 2006 Buenos Aires | 4x100 m free |
| Silver medal – second place | 2010 Medellín | 50 m freestyle |
| Silver medal – second place | 2014 Santiago | 4x100 m free |
| Bronze medal – third place | 2002 Belém | 4x100 m medley |
| Bronze medal – third place | 2010 Medellín | 4x100 m free |
| Bronze medal – third place | 2014 Santiago | 100 m freestyle |

Arlene Iradie Semeco Arismendi (born January 11, 1984) is a female freestyle swimmer from Venezuela

== Career ==
She represented her native country in three consecutive Summer Olympics, starting in 2004. She won two gold medals at the 2007 Pan American Games. She attended the University of Alabama.

== See also ==
- Venezuelan records in swimming
