= 2002 FINA World Swimming Championships (25 m) =

- Host city: Moscow
- Country: Russian Federation
- Opening: 3 April 2002
- Closing: 7 April 2002
- Main venue: Olympiiski

The 6th FINA Short Course World Championships were held in Moscow, Russia on April 3–7, 2002. The event took place in the 25m-pool of the Olympiiski-complex, which also hosted the swimming event at the 1980 Summer Olympics. A record 599 swimmers from 92 countries competed at these championships, which resulted in seven world records.

== Medal table ==
Rank	Nation	Gold	Silver	Bronze	Total
1	Australia (AUS)	9	7	1	17
2	United States (USA)	8	9	9	26
3	Sweden (SWE)	7	2	1	10
4	Ukraine (UKR)	5	0	2	7
5	China (CHN)	3	4	5	12
6	Slovakia (SVK)	2	1	0	3
7	Great Britain (GBR)	1	2	3	6
8	Slovenia (SVN)	1	2	2	5
9	Czech Republic (CZE)	1	2	0	3
10	Finland (FIN)	1	1	2	4
11	Argentina (ARG)	1	1	1	3
11	Canada (CAN)	1	1	1	3
13	Japan (JPN)	1	1	0	2
14	Russia (RUS)	0	2	5	7
15	Brazil (BRA)	0	1	1	2
15	Israel (ISR)	0	1	1	2
15	Romania (ROU)	0	1	1	2
18	Croatia (CRO)	0	1	0	1
18	Portugal (POR)	0	1	0	1
18	South Africa (RSA)	0	1	0	1
21	Denmark (DEN)	0	0	2	2
22	Algeria (ALG)	0	0	1	1
22	Austria (AUT)	0	0	1	1
22	Germany (GER)	0	0	1	1
22	Italy (ITA)	0	0	1	1
22	Switzerland (SUI)	0	0	1	1
Totals (26 entries)		41	41	42	124

== Results ==
=== Freestyle ===
M/V	Event	Gold	Time	Silver	Time	Bronze	Time
Men	50 m	(Argentina) José Meolans	21.36 CR	(United Kingdom) Mark Foster	21.44	(Ukraine) Oleksandr Volynets (Russia) Alexander Popov	21.55
Men	100 m	(Australia) Ashley Callus	46.99	(Argentina) José Meolans	47.09	(Algeria) Salim Iles	47.66
Men	200 m	(United States) Klete Keller	1:44.36	(Brazil) Gustavo Borges	1:45.67	(Canada) Mark Johnston	1:45.88
Men	400 m	(Australia) Grant Hackett	3:38.29	(Czech Republic) Květoslav Svoboda	3:41.97	(United States) Chad Carvin	3:43.55
Men	1500 m	(Australia) Grant Hackett	14:33.94	(United States) Chris Thompson	14:39.43	(Italy) Christian Minotti	14:45.41
Men	4 × 100 m	United States; Scott Tucker; Peter Marshall; Jason Lezak; Klete Keller	3:10.64	Sweden; Eric Lafleur; Stefan Nystrand; Lars Frölander; Mathias Ohlin	3:11.14	Russia; Leonid Khokhlov; Alexander Popov; Denis Pimankov; Andrey Kapralov; Dmitriy Chernichev*; Dmitriy Talepov*	3:11.24
Men	4 × 200 m	Australia; Todd Pearson; Ray Hass; Leon Dunne; Grant Hackett	7:00.36 CR	Russia; Denis Rodkin; Yuri Prilukov; Ilya Nikitin; Andrey Kapralov	7:05.36	United States; Chad Carvin; Erik Vendt; Scott Tucker; Klete Keller	7:08.73
Women	50 m	(Sweden) Therese Alshammar	24.16	(United Kingdom) Alison Sheppard	24.28	(United States) Tammie Stone	24.65
Women	100 m	(Sweden) Therese Alshammar	52.89	(Slovakia) Martina Moravcová	52.96	(China) Xu Yanwei	53.35
Women	200 m	(United States) Lindsay Benko	1:54.04 WR	(China) Yang Yu	1:55.34	(China) Xu Yanwei	1:55.63
Women	400 m	(Ukraine) Yana Klochkova	4:01.26	(China) Chen Hua	4:03.81	(United States) Rachel Komisarz	4:06.30
Women	800 m	(China) Chen Hua	8:16.34 CR	(Russia) Irina Ufimtseva	8:21.91	(Switzerland) Flavia Rigamonti	8:23.38
Women	4 × 100 m	Sweden; Josefin Lillhage; Therese Alshammar; Johanna Sjöberg; Anna-Karin Kammerling	3:35.09	Australia; Sarah Ryan; Petria Thomas; Giaan Rooney; Elka Graham	3:35.97	China; Yang Yu; Tang Jingzhi; Zhu Yingwen; Xu Yanwei	3:36.18
Women	4 × 200 m	China; Xu Yanwei; Zhu Yingwen; Tang Jingzhi; Yang Yu	7:46.30 WR	United States; Lindsay Benko; Gabrielle Rose; Colleen Lanne; Rachel Komisarz	7:47.55	Australia; Elka Graham; Petria Thomas; Lori Munz; Giaan Rooney	7:49.50

=== Backstroke ===
M/V	Event	Gold	Time	Silver	Time	Bronze	Time
Men	50 m	(Australia) Matt Welsh	23.66	(United States) Peter Marshall	24.04	(Germany) Toni Helbig	24.17
Men	100 m	(Australia) Matt Welsh	51.26	(United States) Aaron Peirsol	51.71	(United States) Peter Marshall	51.84
Men	200 m	(United States) Aaron Peirsol	1:51.17 WR	(Croatia) Marko Strahija	1:53.08	(Slovenia) Blaž Medvešek	1:53.66
Women	50 m	(Canada) Jennifer Carroll	27.38 CR	(United States) Haley Cope	27.44	(United States) Diana MacManus	27.60
Women	100 m	(United States) Haley Cope	59.07	(Czech Republic) Ilona Hlaváčková	59.13	(United States) Diana MacManus	59.45
Women	200 m	(United States) Lindsay Benko	2:04.97 CR	(Japan) Reiko Nakamura	2:07.30	(Ukraine) Irina Amshennikova	2:07.71

=== Breaststroke ===
M/V	Event	Gold	Time	Silver	Time	Bronze	Time
Men	50 m	(Ukraine) Oleg Lisogor	26.42	(Portugal) José Couto	27.22	(Brazil) Eduardo Fischer	27.26
Men	100 m	(Ukraine) Oleg Lisogor	58.33 CR	(Japan) Kosuke Kitajima	59.10	(Finland) Jarno Pihlava	59.22
Men	200 m	(Australia) Jim Piper	2:07.16 CR	(United States) David Denniston	2:07.42	(Finland) Jarno Pihlava	2:07.61
Women	50 m	(Sweden) Emma Igelström	29.96 WR	(China) Luo Xuejuan	30.17	(United Kingdom) Zoë Baker	30.56
Women	100 m	(Sweden) Emma Igelström	1:05.38 WR	(South Africa) Sarah Poewe	1:06.16	(China) Luo Xuejuan	1:06.36
Women	200 m	(China) Qi Hui	2:20.91	(Sweden) Emma Igelström	2:21.60	(Austria) Mirna Jukić	2:21.63

=== Butterfly ===
M/V	Event	Gold	Time	Silver	Time	Bronze	Time
Men	50 m	(Australia) Geoff Huegill	22.89 CR	(Australia) Adam Pine	23.29	(United Kingdom) Mark Foster	23.36
Men	100 m	(Australia) Geoff Huegill	50.95	(Australia) Adam Pine	51.27	(Russia) Igor Marchenko	51.41
Men	200 m	(United Kingdom) James Hickman	1:53.14	(Australia) Justin Norris	1:54.07	(Romania) Ioan Gherghel	1:54.16
Women	50 m	(Sweden) Anna-Karin Kammerling	25.55 CR	(Australia) Petria Thomas	26.36	(Israel) Vered Borochovski	26.38
Women	100 m	(Slovakia) Martina Moravcová	57.04	(Australia) Petria Thomas	57.91	(Sweden) Anna-Karin Kammerling	58.12
Women	200 m	(Australia) Petria Thomas	2:05.76 CR	(China) Yang Yu	2:06.10	(United States) Mary Descenza	2:06.17

=== Medley ===
M/V	Event	Gold	Time	Silver	Time	Bronze	Time
Men	100 m	(Slovenia) Peter Mankoč	52.90	(Finland) Jani Sievinen	53.78	(Denmark) Jakob Andersen	54.31
Men	200 m	(Finland) Jani Sievinen	1:55.45 CR	(Slovenia) Peter Mankoč	1:56.13	(United States) Tom Wilkens	1:57.34
Men	400 m	(United States) Tom Wilkens	4:04.82 CR	(Canada) Brian Johns	4:06.85	(Denmark) Jacob Carstensen	4:08.92
Men	4 × 100 m	United States; Aaron Peirsol; David Denniston; Peter Marshall; Jason Lezak	3:29.00 WR	Australia; Geoff Huegill; Jim Piper; Adam Pine; Ashley Callus	3:29.35	Russia; Evgueni Alechine; Dmitri Komornikov; Igor Marchenko; Denis Pimankov	3:30.21
Women	100 m	(Slovakia) Martina Moravcová	59.91	(United States) Gabrielle Rose	1:00.68	(United Kingdom) Alison Sheppard	1:00.88
Women	200 m	(Ukraine) Yana Klochkova	2:08.82	(United States) Gabrielle Rose	2:09.77	(Russia) Oxana Verevka	2:11.25
Women	400 m	(Ukraine) Yana Klochkova	4:30.63	(Slovenia) Alenka Kejžar	4:35.44	(Argentina) Georgina Bardach	4:36.36
Women	4 × 100 m	Sweden; Therese Alshammar; Emma Igelström; Anna-Karin Kammerling; Johanna Sjöberg	3:55.78 WR	United States; Haley Cope; Amanda Beard; Rachel Komisarz; Lindsay Benko	3:57.17	People's Republic of China; Zhan Shu; Luo Xuejuan; Zheng Xi; Xu Yanwei	3:57.29
