= Martín Naidich =

Argentine swimmer

Personal information
- Born: 17 December 1990 (age 35) Buenos Aires, Argentina

Sport
- Sport: Swimming
Medal record
Representing Argentina
South American Games
Gold medal – first place	2014 Santiago	400m freestyle
Gold medal – first place	2014 Santiago	800m freestyle

Martín Naidich (born 17 December 1990) is an Argentine swimmer. He competed in the men's 400 metre freestyle event at the 2016 Summer Olympics.
