= Juan Pereyra =

Argentine swimmer

Personal information
- Full name: Juan Martín Pereyra
- Nationality: Argentina
- Born: August 10, 1980 (age 45) Buenos Aires, Argentina
- Height: 1.91 m (6 ft 3 in)
- Weight: 84 kg (185 lb)

Sport
- Sport: Swimming
- Strokes: Freestyle
Medal record
Men's swimming
Pan American Games
Bronze medal – third place	2011 Guadalajara	1500 m freestyle
South American Games
Silver medal – second place	2006 Buenos Aires	400 m freestyle
Silver medal – second place	2014 Santiago	400 m freestyle
Bronze medal – third place	2006 Buenos Aires	800 m freestyle

Juan Martín Pereyra is an Argentine swimmer. He has represented Argentina at three consecutive Summer Olympics.

At the 2004 Summer Olympics, he competed in the men's 200 metre freestyle, 400 metre freestyle and the 1500 metre freestyle, finishing in 40th, 27th and 26th respectively.

At the 2008 and 2012 Summer Olympics, he competed in the 400 and 1500 metres. In 2008, he finished in 35th and 34th respectively, while in 2012 he finished in 24th and 29th.
