= Walter Arciprete =

Argentine swimmer

Personal information
- Full name: Walter Dario Arciprete
- National team: Argentina
- Born: 25 May 1979 (age 47) Arroyo Seco, Santa Fe, Argentina
- Height: 1.85 m (6 ft 1 in)
- Weight: 80 kg (176 lb)

Sport
- Sport: Swimming
- Strokes: Breaststroke, medley

Walter Dario Arciprete (born May 25, 1979) is an Argentine former swimmer, who specialized in breaststroke and in individual medley events. He represented Argentina at the 2000 Summer Olympics, and achieved numerous Argentine titles and records from the national championships, including his 50 m breaststroke standard (27.81) that stood for more than a decade.

Arciprete competed only in the men's 200 m individual medley at the 2000 Summer Olympics in Sydney. He achieved a FINA B-cut of 2:07.52 from the Argentine Long Course Nationals in Buenos Aires. He challenged seven other swimmers in heat two, including Kazakhstan's 29-year-old Grigoriy Matuzkov. Coming out strongly from a breaststroke leg, Arciprete faded shortly on the final lap to a fifth seed in 2:08.89, just 3.44 seconds behind winner Matuzkov. Arciprete failed to advance into the semifinals, as he placed forty-fifth overall in the prelims.
