= Cecilia Biagioli =

Argentine swimmer (born 1985)

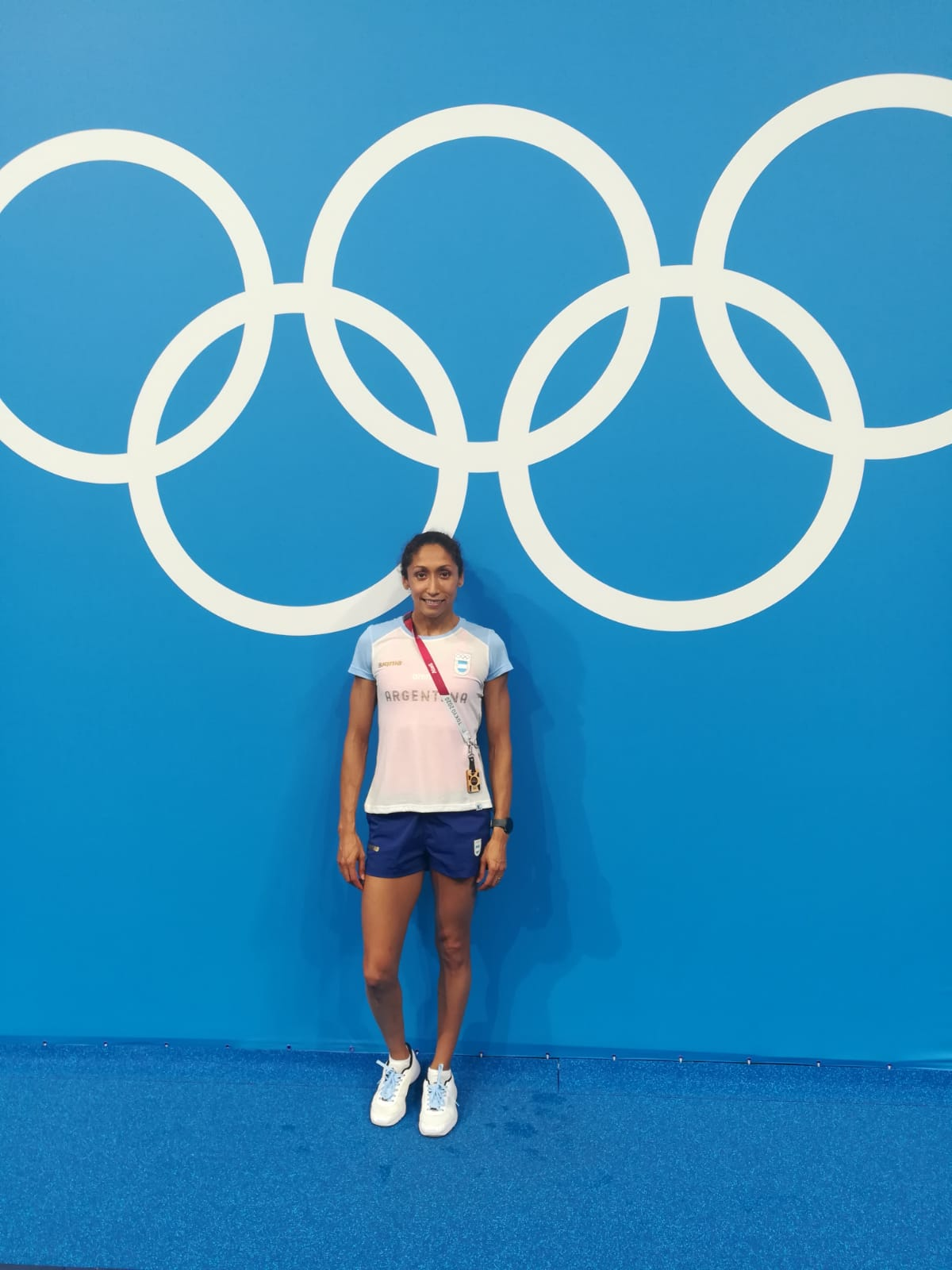
- Biagioli at the 2020 Summer Olympics

Personal information
- Full name: Cecilia Elizabeth Biagioli
- Born: 3 January 1985 (age 41) Córdoba, Argentina
- Height: 1.68 m (5 ft 6 in)

Sport
- Country: Argentina
- Sport: Swimming
- Strokes: Freestyle
Medal record
Pan American Games
| Gold medal – first place | 2011 Guadalajara | 10 km open water |
| Silver medal – second place | 2019 Lima | 10 km open water |
South American Games
| Gold medal – first place | 2002 Belém | 400 m freestyle |
| Gold medal – first place | 2002 Belém | 800 m freestyle |
| Gold medal – first place | 2006 Buenos Aires | 200 m freestyle |
| Gold medal – first place | 2006 Buenos Aires | 400 m freestyle |
| Gold medal – first place | 2006 Buenos Aires | 4×200 m freestyle |
| Gold medal – first place | 2010 Medellín | 200 m freestyle |
| Silver medal – second place | 2002 Belém | 200 m freestyle |
| Silver medal – second place | 2006 Buenos Aires | 800 m freestyle |
| Silver medal – second place | 2006 Buenos Aires | 1500 m freestyle |
| Silver medal – second place | 2006 Buenos Aires | 4×100 m medley |
| Silver medal – second place | 2010 Medellín | 4×200 m freestyle |
| Silver medal – second place | 2014 Santiago | 10 km open water |
| Bronze medal – third place | 2002 Belém | 4×100 m freestyle |
| Bronze medal – third place | 2006 Buenos Aires | 4×100 m freestyle |
| Bronze medal – third place | 2010 Medellín | 400 m freestyle |
| Bronze medal – third place | 2014 Santiago | 800 m freestyle |
| Bronze medal – third place | 2014 Santiago | 1500 m freestyle |
| Bronze medal – third place | 2014 Santiago | 4×100 m freestyle |

Cecilia Elizabeth Biagioli (born 3 January 1985 in Córdoba, Argentina) is an Olympic and national record-holding swimmer from Argentina. She swam for Argentina at the 2000, 2004, 2008 and 2012 Olympics. She represented Argentina at the 2020 Summer Olympics.

== Career ==
At the 2009 World Championship she set the South American Record in the 400 free (4:10.16).

At the 2011 Pan American Games she won the gold medal in the open water swimming 10 km event.

In 2019, she won the silver medal in the women's marathon 10 kilometres at the 2019 Pan American Games held in Lima, Peru.

== Family ==
Her sister is triathlete Romina Biagioli.
