= Eduardo Fischer =

Brazilian swimmer (born 1980)

Personal information
- Full name: Eduardo Aquiles Fischer
- Nationality: Brazil
- Born: March 25, 1980 (age 46) Joinville, Santa Catarina, Brazil
- Height: 1.81 m (5 ft 11 in)
- Weight: 76 kg (168 lb)

Sport
- Sport: Swimming
- Strokes: Breaststroke
Medal record
Men's swimming
Representing Brazil
World Championships (SC)
| Bronze medal – third place | 2002 Moscow | 50m breaststroke |
Pan American Games
| Silver medal – second place | 2003 S.Domingo | 4×100 medley |
| Bronze medal – third place | 2003 S.Domingo | 100 breaststroke |

Eduardo Aquiles Fischer (born March 25, 1980, in Joinville, Santa Catarina, Brazil) is an Olympic breaststroke swimmer from Brazil. He swam for Brazil at the 2000 and 2004 Olympics.

== Early years ==
Eduardo began swimming at the age of seven, but only started competing at 11. The motivation came from his older brother, who has practiced the sport. His first club was the Joinville Tênis Clube, where he stayed for ten years. In 1999, he went to Minas Tênis Clube, where he went to defend the CR Vasco da Gama until 2002, when he returned to Joinville.

The first major title came at the 1997 Brazilian Winter Championship, with the gold medal in the 100-metre breaststroke.

== International career ==
Fischer participated in the 2000 Summer Olympics in Sydney, finishing 31st in the 100-metre breaststroke and 12th in the 4×100-metre medley.

In 2001, he already held the South American record in the 50-metre breaststroke and 100-metre breaststroke.

At the 2002 FINA World Swimming Championships (25 m) in Moscow, Fischer turned in his best performance in an international tournament, getting the bronze medal in the 50-metre breaststroke. In addition, he was in the 100-metre breaststroke final, finishing in 6th place, and in the 4×100-metre medley final, finishing in 7th place. In this competition, he beat the South American short-course record twice in the 50-metre breaststroke (27.51 seconds in qualifying and 27.23 seconds in the semifinal), and twice in the 100-metre breaststroke (59.64 seconds in qualifying and 59.60 seconds in the final), beating the South American record in the 4×100-metre medley final (3:35.59). The South American record in the 50-metre breaststroke was not broken again until 2008 (by Felipe França).

Participating in the 2003 World Aquatics Championships in Barcelona, Fischer finished 21st in the 50-metre breaststroke, 23rd in the 100-metre breaststroke, and 17th in the 4×100-metre medley.

At the 2003 Pan American Games in Santo Domingo, Fischer won the silver medal in the 4×100-metre medley and bronze in the 100-metre breaststroke. In the 100-metre breaststroke, he broke the South American Olympic pool record, and still hit the index for the 2004 Summer Olympics with a time of 1:01.88.

In 2003, Fischer broke the South American Olympic pool record in the 50-metre breaststroke with a time of 28.21 seconds. This record was not broken again until 2007 (by Felipe Lima).

At the 2004 Summer Olympics in Athens, Fischer finished 15th in the 100-metre breaststroke semifinals. He also swam the 200-metre breaststroke, finishing 24th, and the 4×100-metre medley, placing 15th. In the 100-metre breaststroke heats, he broke the South American record with a time of 1:01.84.

At the 2004 FINA World Swimming Championships (25 m) in Indianapolis, Fischer was close to winning a medal on three occasions. He finished 4th in the 50-metre breaststroke (10 hundredths short of bronze), 4th in the 100-metre breaststroke, and 4th in the 4×100-metre medley with teammates Guilherme Guido, Kaio Almeida, and César Cielo. The medley performance broke the South American record with a time of 3:33.02. This 4×100-metre medley area record was not broken again until 2008.

Fischer swam in the 2006 FINA World Swimming Championships (25 m) in Shanghai, where he made the semifinals, finishing 16th in the 50-metre breaststroke, 22nd in the 100-metre breaststroke, and 9th in the 4×100-metre medley.

At the 2008 FINA World Swimming Championships (25 m) in Manchester, Fischer made the 50-metre breaststroke semifinal, but was disqualified. He finished 17th in the 100-metre breaststroke.

In May 2009, Fischer beat the South American record in the short-course 100-metre breaststroke, with a time of 58.14 seconds. He also broke the 50-metre breaststroke record with a time of 26.73 seconds.

Fischer attended the 2010 Pan Pacific Swimming Championships in Irvine, where he was disqualified in the 50-metre breaststroke and finished 18th in the 100-metre breaststroke.

== After professional swimming ==
At the end of 2011, the 31-year-old Eduardo Fischer announced his retirement from professional swimming. Graduated in Law, began to devote himself to his career in tax consultancy.

== See also ==
- List of South American records in swimming
