= Agustín Fiorilli =

Argentine swimmer (born 1978)

Personal information
- Full name: Agustín Ignacio Fiorilli
- Born: October 8, 1978 (age 47) Rosario, Argentina

Sport
- Sport: Swimming

Agustín Ignacio Fiorilli (born October 8, 1978) is a freestyle swimmer from Argentina, who represented his native country at the two consecutive Summer Olympics, starting in 1996 (Atlanta, Georgia)

In 2015, Fiorilli was honoured on the Olympic Walk in Rosario for his Olympic accomplishments.

== See also ==
- Club Atlético River Plate
