= Fabíola Molina =

Brazilian swimmer (born 1975)

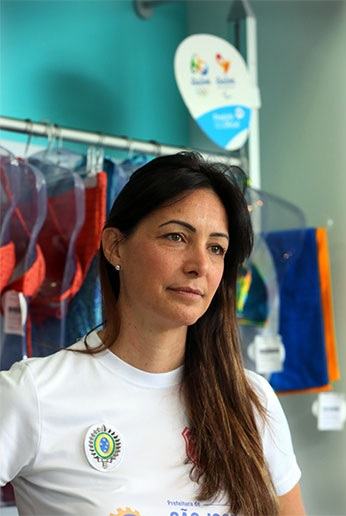

Personal information
- Full name: Fabíola Pulga Molina
- Born: May 22, 1975 (age 51) São José dos Campos, São Paulo, Brazil
- Height: 1.77 m (5 ft 10 in)
- Weight: 62 kg (137 lb)

Sport
- Sport: Swimming
- Strokes: Backstroke
Medal record
Women's swimming
Representing Brazil
Pan Pacific Championships
Bronze medal – third place	2010 Irvine	50 m backstroke
Pan American Games
Silver medal – second place	2007 Rio de Janeiro	100 m backstroke
Bronze medal – third place	1995 Mar del Plata	100 m backstroke
Bronze medal – third place	1995 Mar del Plata	4x100 m medley
Bronze medal – third place	1999 Winnipeg	4x100 m medley
Bronze medal – third place	2011 Guadalajara	4x100 m medley
Summer Universiade
Silver medal – second place	1997 Sicily	100 m backstroke
South American Games
Gold medal – first place	2010 Medellín	50 m backstroke
Gold medal – first place	2010 Medellín	100 m backstroke
Gold medal – first place	2010 Medellín	4x100 m medley

Fabíola Pulga Molina (born May 25, 1975 in São José dos Campos, São Paulo, Brazil) is a butterfly and backstroke swimmer from Brazil, who competed at the 2000, 2008 and 2012 Olympics.

A resident of Coral Springs, Florida, she twice won the bronze medal with the women's relay team in the 4×100-metre medley at the Pan American Games (1995 and 1999).

Molina trained at The Race Club, a summer swimming camp founded by Olympic Swimmers Gary Hall, Jr. and his father, Gary Hall, Sr. The Race Club, originally known as "The World Team," was designed to serve as a training group for elite swimmers across the world in preparation for the 2000 Sydney Olympic Games. To be able to train with the Race Club, one must either have been ranked in the top 20 in the world the past 3 calendar years or top 3 in their nation in the past year. The Race Club included such well known swimmers as Roland Mark Schoeman, Mark Foster, Ryk Neethling, and Therese Alshammar.

== International career ==
=== Olympic Games ===
At the 2000 Summer Olympics in Sydney, Molina finished 24th in the 100-metre backstroke, and 36th in the 100-metre butterfly.

At the 2008 Summer Olympics in Beijing, Molina finished 10th in the 4×100-metre medley, and 18th in the 100-metre backstroke. She broke the South American record of the 100-metre backstroke at heats, with a time of 1:00.71, and in the 4×100-metre medley, doing 4:02.61.

At the 2012 Summer Olympics in London, Molina finished 24th in the 100-metre backstroke.

=== World Championships ===
Molina participated in the 1995 FINA World Swimming Championships (25 m) in Rio de Janeiro. She finished 6th in the 4×100-metre medley, with a time of 4:12.76, and 13th in the 200-metre backstroke, with a time of 2:13.96. She also swam the 100-metre backstroke.

At the 1998 World Aquatics Championships in Perth, she finished 11th in the 100-metre backstroke, and 16th in the 200-metre backstroke.

Molina participated in the 1999 FINA World Swimming Championships (25 m) in Hong Kong, where she finished 9th in the 100-metre individual medley, 10th in the 400-metre individual medley (breaking the South American record, with a time of 4:46.16), 12th in the 200-metre backstroke, and 13th in the 50-metre and 100-metre backstroke.

At the 2002 FINA World Swimming Championships (25 m) in Moscow, Molina finished 24th in the 50-metre backstroke, and 27th in the 100-metre backstroke.

Swimming at the 2004 FINA World Swimming Championships (25 m) in Indianapolis, Molina finished 6th in the 50-metre backstroke final, her best position in World Championships, breaking the South American record with a time of 28.03 seconds. She also finished 12th in the 100-metre backstroke and 14th in the 100-metre butterfly.

At the 2005 World Aquatics Championships, in Montreal, she finished 14th in the 50-metre backstroke, and 19th in the 100-metre backstroke.

At the 2006 FINA World Swimming Championships (25 m) in Shanghai, Molina finished 13th in the 50-metre backstroke, and 16th in the 100-metre backstroke.

At the 2007 World Aquatics Championships, in Melbourne, she finished 13th in the 50-metre backstroke, 18th in the 100-metre backstroke, and 35th in the 100-metre butterfly. She broke the South American record in the 50-metre backstroke (29.02 seconds) and 100-metre backstroke (1:02.43).

At the 2008 FINA World Swimming Championships (25 m) in Manchester, Molina finished 11th in the 50-metre backstroke, and 14th in the 100-metre backstroke.

At the 2009 World Aquatics Championships in Rome, she went to the 50-metre backstroke final, and finished in eighth place. She was also a finalist in the 4×100-metre medley, finishing 8th, and obtained the 14th place in the 100-metre backstroke. She broke the South American record of the 50-metre backstroke (27.70 seconds in semifinals), 100-metre backstroke (1:00.07 at 4×100-metre medley final, opening relay) and 4×100-metre medley (3:58.49 at heats).

Participating in the 2010 FINA World Swimming Championships (25 m) in Dubai, Molina reached the 50-metre backstroke final, finishing 8th. She was also a finalist in the 4×100-metre medley, finishing 8th and breaking the South American record, with a time of 3:59.45.; and placed 11th in the 100-metre backstroke.

Molina was at the 2012 FINA World Swimming Championships (25 m) in Istanbul, where she finished 7th in the 50-metre backstroke final, 10th in the 4×100-metre medley, and 22nd in the 100-metre backstroke.

=== Pan Pacific Swimming Championships ===
At the 2006 Pan Pacific Swimming Championships in Victoria, Molina finished 14th in the 100-metre butterfly and 22nd in the 100-metre backstroke.

At the 2010 Pan Pacific Swimming Championships in Irvine, Molina won a bronze medal in the 50-metre backstroke, in a rare result in swimming, where 3 players tied with the same time of 28.44 seconds. She also finished 8th in the 100-metre backstroke and dropped the 100-metre butterfly.

=== Pan American Games ===
At 16 years old, Molina participated in the 1991 Pan American Games in Havana, where she finished 8th in the 100-metre backstroke.

At the 1995 Pan American Games in Mar del Plata, Molina won two bronze medals, in the 100-metre backstroke and in the 4×100-metre medley. She also finished 4th in the 200-metre backstroke, and 5th in the 400-metre individual medley.

At the 1999 Pan American Games in Winnipeg, Molina won a bronze medal in the 4×100-metre medley. She also finished 4th in the 400-metre individual medley, 5th in the 100-metre backstroke, 6th in the 200-metre backstroke, and 6th in the 200-metre individual medley.

At 32 years old, in the 2007 Pan American Games in Rio de Janeiro, she won the silver medal in the 100-metre backstroke, breaking the South American record. She also won bronze in the 4×100-metre medley, but the result was annulled due to Rebeca Gusmão's doping, who participated in the relay.

Already 36 years old, she went to the 2011 Pan American Games in Guadalajara, where she won a bronze medal in the 4×100-metre medley, and ranked 4th place in the 100-metre backstroke.

=== University ===
Molina participated in the 1995 Summer Universiade in Fukuoka, not winning medals.

At the 1997 Summer Universiade in Messina, Molina won a silver medal in the 100-metre backstroke. She also finished 5th in the 200-metre backstroke, breaking the South American record, with a time of 2:17.39.

Molina participated in the 2001 Summer Universiade in Beijing, not winning medals. She finished 8th in the 200-metre backstroke, 9th in the 100-metre backstroke, and 11th in the 50-metre backstroke.

=== South American Games ===
At the 2010 South American Games in Medellín, Molina won three gold medals in the 50-metre backstroke, 100-metre backstroke and 4×100-metre medley.

=== Military World Games ===
At the 2011 Military World Games in Rio de Janeiro, she won the gold medal in the 100-metre backstroke, and four silver medals in the 50-metre and 200-metre backstroke, 50-metre butterfly and 4×100-metre medley.

== Personal bests ==
Fabíola Molina is the current holder, or former holder, of the following records:

Long Course (50 meters):

- Former Americas record holder of the 50m backstroke: 27.70, time obtained on July 29, 2009
- South American record holder of the 100m backstroke: 1:00.07, time obtained on August 1, 2009
- South American record holder of the 4 × 100 m medley: 3:58.49, time obtained on August 1, 2009 with Carolina Mussi, Gabriella Silva and Tatiana Lemos

Short course (25 meters):

- Former South American record holder of the 50m backstroke: 26.61, time obtained on October 6, 2009
- Former South American record holder of the 100m backstroke: 57.63, time obtained on November 15, 2009
- South American record holder of the 100m medley: 1:00.66, time obtained on October 17, 2009
- South American record holder of the 4 × 100 m medley: 3:57.66, time obtained on December 14, 2012 with Beatriz Travalon, Daynara de Paula and Larissa Oliveira

== See also ==
- List of Americas records in swimming
- List of South American records in swimming
- List of Brazilian records in swimming
- The Race Club
