= José Meolans =

Argentine swimmer (born 1978)

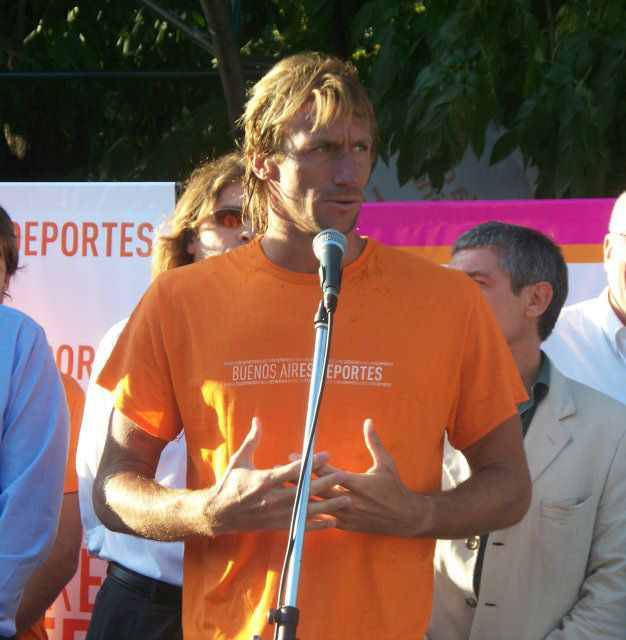
- Meolans in 2012.

Personal information
- Full name: José Martín Meolans
- Nationality: Argentina
- Born: 22 June 1978 (age 48) Córdoba, Argentina
- Height: 1.95 m (6 ft 5 in)
- Weight: 88 kg (194 lb)

Sport
- Sport: Swimming
- Strokes: Freestyle
- Club: Academia Natacion Gabriel Taborin; River Plate
Medal record
World Championships (SC)
Gold medal – first place	2002 Moscow	50 m freestyle
Silver medal – second place	1999 Hong Kong	50 m freestyle
Silver medal – second place	2002 Moscow	100 m freestyle
Bronze medal – third place	2006 Shanghai	100 m freestyle
Pan American Games
Gold medal – first place	2003 Santo Domingo	100 m freestyle
Silver medal – second place	1999 Winnipeg	50 m freestyle
Silver medal – second place	1999 Winnipeg	100 m freestyle
Silver medal – second place	2003 Santo Domingo	50 m freestyle
Silver medal – second place	2003 Santo Domingo	100 m butterfly
Silver medal – second place	2007 Rio de Janeiro	100 m freestyle
Bronze medal – third place	1999 Winnipeg	100 m butterfly

José Martin Meolans (born 22 June 1978 in Córdoba) is a freestyle swimmer from Argentina, who won the world title in the 50 metre freestyle at the 2002 FINA Short Course World Championships in Moscow, Russia.

A year later he won 100m freestyle at the 2003 Pan American Games. Meolans, a member of the swimming team at the Club Atlético River Plate, is trained by Orlando Moccagatta. He competed in three consecutive Summer Olympics for his native country, starting in 1996.

In the 24th International Championship held on 2006 in Porto, Portugal, he won two gold medals in freestyle: 50 metres (23.14 sec) and 100 (50.66 sec). He also finished third at the 2006 FINA Short Course World Championships in 100 metre freestyle.

== See also ==
- Argentine records in swimming
- South American records in swimming

Awards
Preceded by (Argentina) Carlos Espinola	Olimpia de Oro; 1997	Succeeded by (Argentina) Andrea Noemí González
