= Agustina de Giovanni =

Argentine swimmer (born 1985)

Agustina De Giovanni
Personal information
- National team: Argentina
- Born: 16 July 1985 (age 40) Santa Fe, Argentina
- Height: 1.84 m (6 ft 0 in)
- Weight: 73 kg (161 lb)

Sport
- Sport: Swimming
- Strokes: Breaststroke
- Club: Club Regatas, Santa Fe; Gimnasia y Esgrima Santa Fe
- College team: University of Alabama (U.S.)
- Coach: Raul Strnad; Sonja Porter; Don Gambril (U.S.)

Agustina De Giovanni (born July 16, 1985) is an Argentine former swimmer, who specialized in breaststroke events. She is a twelve-time Argentine champion and two-time record holder in the breaststroke (both 100 and 200 m): records in her possession for 15 years. She also holds a South American record of 2:26.17 in the 200 m breaststroke at the 2010 Jose Finkel Trophy Meet in Rio de Janeiro, Brazil. De Giovanni won the World Cup in Belo Horizonte 2005 in the 200 m breaststroke and bronze in the 100m breaststroke.

De Giovanni was the captain of her National Team when she competed for Argentina.

== Olympic Career ==
De Giovanni's Olympic debut came as Argentina's youngest swimmer (aged 19) at the 2004 Summer Olympics in Athens, swimming in the 200 m breaststroke. She represented Argentina at the Pan American Games in 2 events: 2003 in Santo Domingo and 2007 in Rio de Janeiro, Brazil, in the 100 and 200 breaststroke.

At the 2008 Summer Olympics in Beijing, de Giovanni qualified again for the women's 200 m breaststroke by breaking a new Argentine record with a time of 2:31.15 from the Ohio State Post-NCAA Long Course Invite in Columbus, Ohio.

== The University of Alabama, USA ==
De Giovanni is also a former member of the swimming team for Alabama Crimson Tide where she was the MVP of the white and crimson team for 3 years in a row. She also held the school record in more than one event, (100 - 200 Breastroke - 400 Individual Medley - 1650 Free - 500 Free - 4 x 100 Individual Medley Relay). Agustina is an All - American student athlete, graduating in International Relations, part of the SEC Honor Roll 4 years in a row and she is a Hall of Fame Member for the University of Alabama Swimming and Diving.

On the upcoming years after her graduation, De Giovanni got an MBA at Austral University and Master Program on Mental Performance Training for Elite Athletes. Currently, has worked as a Mental Performance Coach with professional athletes and teams all over the world.

== TV Hosting ==
As part of her multi- faceted career, Agustina worked as a TV Host and commentator for different TV signals in Argentina - South America from 2014 until 2020. Her most remarkable work was on ESPN for the Olympic Games, swimming tournaments and soccer events. She has also hosted the news on IP Investigacion Periodistica and Telefe Santa Fe, as well had a column on Gol Inclusive, a radio show broadcast on Club 947.
