= Georgina Bardach =

Argentine swimmer (born 1983)

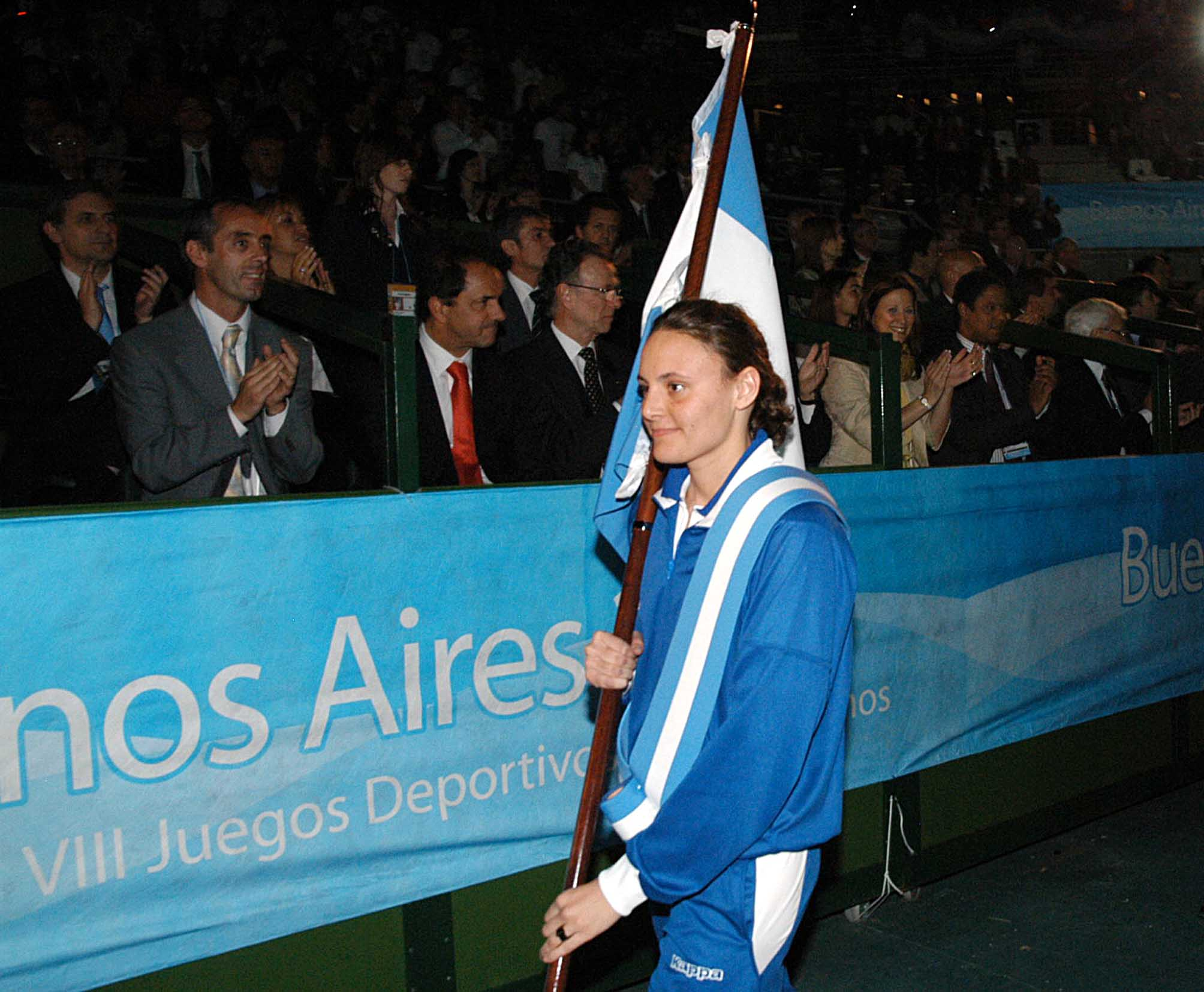

Personal information
- Full name: Georgina Bardach Martin
- Nationality: Argentina
- Born: August 18, 1983 (age 42) Córdoba, Argentina
- Height: 1.71 m (5 ft 7 in)
- Weight: 68 kg (150 lb)

Sport
- Sport: Swimming
- Strokes: Individual Medley
Medal record
Women's swimming
Representing Argentina
Olympic Games
Bronze medal – third place	2004 Athens	400 m medley
World Championships (SC)
Bronze medal – third place	2002 Moscow	400 m medley
Pan American Games
Gold medal – first place	2003 Santo Domingo	400 m medley
Bronze medal – third place	2007 Rio	400 m medley

Georgina Bardach Martin (born August 18, 1983 in Córdoba) is a swimmer from Argentina. At the 2002 FINA Short Course World Championships in Moscow, she finished third in the 400 m Individual Medley race. She also won the gold medal at the 2003 Pan American Games in Santo Domingo.

At the 2004 Summer Olympics in Athens, she won the bronze medal in the Women's 400 m Individual Medley competition. Her time was 4:37.51. Bardach also competed at the 2000 Summer Olympics in Sydney, 2008 Olympics in Beijing and 2012 Olympics in London but did not advance out of the preliminary heats.

Georgina won the bronze medal at the 2007 Pan American Games in Rio de Janeiro.

At the Brazilian Swimming Championship of May 2006, Georgina broke the South American record for 200 meters backstroke in long course swim pools with 2:17.033 seconds, 6 milliseconds ahead of Fabíola Molina's 1997 mark.

In 2010 she was granted the Platinum Konex Award as the best swimmer of the last decade in Argentina.

== See also ==
- Swimming at the 2004 Summer Olympics
