= 2006 South American Games =

Multi-sport event in Buenos Aires, Argentina

VIII South American Games
- The official logo of the Buenos Aires South American Games.
- Host city: Buenos Aires
- Country: Argentina
- Nations: 15
- Athletes: 2,770
- Events: 464 in 28 sports
- Opening: November 9, 2006
- Closing: November 19, 2006
- Opened by: Daniel Scioli
- Torch lighter: Carlos Espínola
- Main venue: Estadio del Parque Roca

The VIII South American Games (Spanish: Juegos Sudamericanos; Portuguese: Jogos Sul-Americanos) were a multi-sport event held from 9 to 19 November 2006 in Buenos Aires, Argentina, with some events taking place in Mar del Plata (canoeing, cycling, futsal, handball, roller sports, rowing, triathlon). An appraisal of the games and detailed medal lists were published elsewhere, emphasizing the results of the Argentinian teams.

The Games were organized by the South American Sports Organization (ODESUR), who awarded the Games to the city with 10 votes over the bids by previous hosts Cuenca, Ecuador (3 votes) and Lima, Peru (1 vote).

The Games were originally awarded to the first edition host La Paz, Bolivia, but this decision was retracted following domestic instability in Bolivia during 2005. This country did not participate in the subsequent selection process after ODESUR denied its request to reconsider the decision.

Torch lighter at the Estadio del Parque Roca was multiple Olympic medalist, windsurfer Carlos Espínola.

== Participants ==
15 ODESUR members participated on the games. Colombia returned from the games because it did not participate in the Previous games. Argentina had the most athletes (544) along with Brazil (424) and Chile (360). Guyana had the least athletes (4).

- Argentina (544) (Hosts)
- Aruba (41)
- Bolivia (122)
- Brazil (424)
- Chile (360)
- Colombia (252)
- Ecuador (170)
- Guyana (4)
- Netherlands Antilles (22)
- Panama (15)
- Paraguay (138)
- Peru (144)
- Suriname (15)
- Uruguay (265)
- Venezuela (328)

== Venues ==
=== Buenos Aires ===
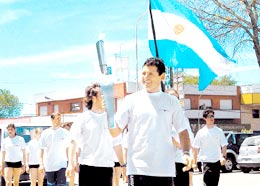
Cyclist Juan Curuchet with the South American Torch in Mar del Plata.

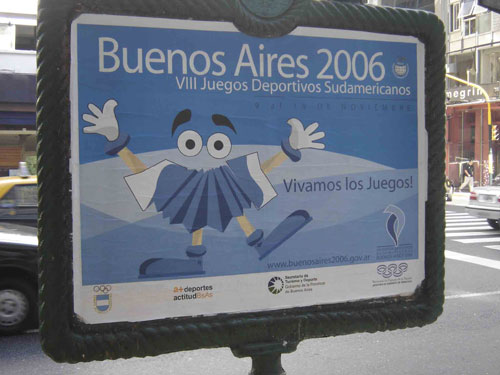
Bandoneonito, mascot of the 2006 South American Games.

- CeNARD - Athletics, Weightlifting, Judo, Wrestling, Taekwondo, Field Hockey and Swimming.
- Club Atlético River Plate - Table Tennis.
- Federación Argentina de Boxeo - Boxing.
- Estadio Mary Terán de Weiss - Tennis.
- Gimnasia y Esgrima de Buenos Aires - Fencing.
- Tiro Federal - Shooting.
- Parque Polideportivo Roca - Archery
- Buenos Aires Yacht Club - Sailing.
- Club Atlético Vélez Sarsfield - Karate, Bocce.
- Club Ciudad de Buenos Aires - Gymnastics.
- San Lorenzo de Almagro - Artistic roller skating.
- Lake of the Autódromo Juan y Oscar Gálvez - Waterskiing.

=== Mar del Plata ===
- Polideportivo Islas Malvinas - Handball and Futsal.
- Laguna de los Padres - Canoeing and Rowing.
- Patinódromo Municipal - Inline speed skating.

=== Other areas ===
- Capilla del señor - Equestrian.
- Avellaneda - Bowling.
- Zarate - Open water swimming.

== Medal Count ==
The medal count for these Games is tabulated below. This table is sorted by the number of gold medals earned by each country. The number of silver medals is taken into consideration next, and then the number of bronze medals.

* Host nation (Argentina)

Rank	Nation	Gold	Silver	Bronze	Total
1	Argentina (ARG)*	107	96	93	296
2	Venezuela (VEN)	98	85	101	284
3	Colombia (COL)	97	72	74	243
4	Brazil (BRA)	96	105	101	302
5	Chile (CHL)	37	42	58	137
6	Ecuador (ECU)	14	27	38	79
7	Peru (PER)	8	13	22	43
8	Uruguay (URY)	4	9	13	26
9	Paraguay (PRY)	2	4	5	11
10	Guyana (GUY)	1	1	0	2
11	Bolivia (BOL)	0	2	5	7
12	Panama (PAN)	0	2	1	3
13	Aruba (ABW)	0	1	1	2
14	Netherlands Antilles (ANT)	0	0	2	2
15	Suriname (SUR)	0	0	1	1
Totals (15 entries)		464	459	515	1,438

== Sports ==
- Archery
- Athletics^{†}
- Badminton
- Baseball
- Boxing
- Canoeing
- Cycling
- Equestrian
- Fencing
- Field Hockey
- Football
- Gymnastics
- Handball
- Judo
- Karate
- Softball
- Rowing
- Modern Pentathlon
- Sailing
- Shooting
- Swimming
- Table Tennis
- Taekwondo
- Tennis^{‡}
- Triathlon
- Volleyball
- Weightlifting
- Wrestling

=== Notes ===
^{†}: The competition was reserved to representatives aged under 23.

^{‡}: The competition was reserved to junior representatives (U-20).
