= Swimming at the 2006 Central American and Caribbean Games – Men's 50 metre butterfly =

The men's 50m Butterfly event at the 2006 Central American and Caribbean Games occurred on Monday, 17 July 2006 at the S.U. Pedro de Heredia Aquatic Complex in Cartagena, Colombia.

== Records ==
World Record	Roland Schoeman (RSA)	22.96	2005-07-25	Montreal, Canada
CAC Record	—	—	—	—

== Results ==
=== Final ===
Place	Swimmer	Country	Time	Note
1	Albert Subirats	Venezuela	24.09	GR
2	Octavio Alesi	Venezuela	24.38	
3	Ricardo Busquets	Puerto Rico	24.69	
3	José Manuel Sotomayor	Mexico	24.69	
5	Jeremy Knowles	Bahamas	24.94	
6	Shaune Fraser	Cayman Islands	25.22	
7	Jacinto Ayala	Dominican Republic	25.37	
8	Julio Galofre	Colombia	25.69	

=== Preliminaries ===
Rank	Swimmer	Country	Time	Note
1	Albert Subirats	Venezuela	24.11	Q
2	Octavio Alesi	Venezuela	24.53	Q
3	José Sotomayor	Mexico	24.73	Q
4	Ricardo Busquets	Puerto Rico	24.86	Q
5	Shaune Fraser	Cayman Islands	25.26	Q
6	Jeremy Knowles	Bahamas	25.31	Q
7	Julio Galofre	Colombia	25.52	Q
8	Jacinto Ayala	Dominican Republic	25.54	Q
9	Carlos Vivero	Colombia	25.61	
10	Elvis Burrows	Bahamas	25.68	
11	Shawn Clarke	Barbados	25.71	
12	César David Uribe	Mexico	25.75	
13	Jorge Arturo Arce	Costa Rica	25.81	
14	Ismael Ortiz	Panama	25.88	
15	Brad Hamilton	Jamaica	26.18	
16	Gustavo Guadalupe	Puerto Rico	26.33	
17	Roy Barahona	Honduras	26.39	
18	Anthony Schamber	Trinidad and Tobago	26.44	
19	Rodrigo Díaz	Guatemala	26.55	
20	Marcelino Richaards	Suriname	26.86	
20	Martyn Forde	Barbados	26.86	
22	Scott Hensley	Virgin Islands	26.97	
23	Travis Forte	Jamaica	27.23	
24	Naji Ferguson	Grenada	27.24	
