= Swimming at the 2006 Central American and Caribbean Games – Men's 100 metre freestyle =

The Men's 100m Freestyle event at the 2006 Central American and Caribbean Games occurred on Friday, July 21, 2006 at the S.U. Pedro de Heredia Aquatic Complex in Cartagena, Colombia.

== Records ==
World Record	Pieter van den Hoogenband (NED)	47.84	2000-09-19	(Australia) Sydney
CAC Record	Ricardo Busquets (PUR)	50.00	1998-08-11	(Venezuela) Maracaibo

== Results ==
=== Final ===
Rank	Swimmer	Country	Time	Note
1	Albert Subirats	Venezuela	49.55	GR
2	Shaune Fraser	Cayman Islands	50.02	
3	George Bovell	Trinidad and Tobago	50.19	
4	Octavio Alesi	Venezuela	50.74	
5	Juan Yeh	Mexico	51.29	
6	Ricardo Busquets	Puerto Rico	51.43	
7	Antonio Hernández	Cuba	51.86	
8	Ismael Ortiz	Panama	52.65	

=== Preliminaries ===
Rank	Swimmer	Country	Time	Note
1	George Bovell	Trinidad and Tobago	51.30	Q
2	Shaune Fraser	Cayman Islands	51.41	Q
3	Albert Subirats	Venezuela	51.49	Q
4	Ricardo Busquets	Puerto Rico	51.66	Q
5	Antonio Hernández	Cuba	51.72	Q
6	Juan Yeh	Mexico	51.75	Q
7	Ismael Ortiz	Panama	51.97	Q
8	Octavio Alesi	Venezuela	52.64	Q
9	Terrence Haynes	Barbados	52.82	
10	Josh Laban	Virgin Islands	52.86	
11	Rodrigo Díaz	Guatemala	53.12	
12	Martyn Forde	Barbados	53.18	
13	Mario Montoya	Costa Rica	53.20	
14	Brad Hamilton	Jamaica	53.38	
15	Jan Roodzant	Aruba	53.48	
16	Carolos Vivero	Colombia	53.51	
17	Daniel Cuellar	Colombia	53.53	
18	Jonathon Wong	Jamaica	54.98	
19	Horacio Carcamo	Honduras	55.90	
20	Elvis Burrows	Bahamas	55.92	
21	Brett Fraser	Cayman Islands	56.67	
22	Jacinto Ayala	Dominican Republic	57.60	
23	Morgan Locke	Virgin Islands	58.33	
24	Kian Ashby	Grenada	1:00.14	
--	Rodion Davelaar	Netherlands Antilles	DNS	
--	Jose Sotomayor	Mexico	DNS	
--	Nicholas Bovell	Trinidad and Tobago	DNS	
