= Swimming at the 2006 Central American and Caribbean Games – Men's 50 metre freestyle =

The men's 50m Freestyle event at the 2006 Central American and Caribbean Games occurred on Wednesday, July 19, 2006, at the S.U. Pedro de Heredia Aquatic Complex in Cartagena, Colombia.

== Records ==
World Record	Alexander Popov (RUS)	21.64	2000-07-16	Moscow, Russia
CAC Record	Ricardo Busquets (PUR)	22.55	2002-11-28	(El Salvador) San Salvador

== Results ==
=== Final ===
Place	Swimmer	Country	Time	Note
1	George Bovell	Trinidad and Tobago	22.67	
2	Albert Subirats	Venezuela	22.92	
3	Ricardo Busquets	Puerto Rico	23.01	
4	Octavio Alesi	Venezuela	23.21	
5	Jacinto Ayala	Dominican Republic	23.21	
6	Rodrigo Díaz	Guatemala	23.52	
7	José Sotomayor	Mexico	23.70	
7	Terrence Haynes	Barbados	23.70	

=== Preliminaries ===
Rank	Swimmer	Country	Time	Note
1	George Bovell	Trinidad and Tobago	23.07	Q
2	Ricardo Busquets	Puerto Rico	23.14	Q
3	Albert Subirats	Venezuela	23.41	Q
4	José Sotomayor	Mexico	23.50	Q
5	Jacinto Ayala	Dominican Republic	23.55	Q
6	Terrence Haynes	Barbados	23.56	Q
7	Octavio Alesi	Venezuela	23.59	Q
8	Rodrigo Díaz	Guatemala	23.77	Q
9	Antonio Hernández	Cuba	23.80	
10	Josh Laban	Virgin Islands	23.88	
11	Martyn Forde	Barbados	24.00	
12	Gustavo Guadalupe	Puerto Rico	24.06	
13	Jan Roodzant	Aruba	24.13	
14	Onan Orlando	Guyana	24.17	
15	Ismael Ortiz	Panama	24.39	
16	Daniel Cuellár	Colombia	24.45	
17	Elvis Burrows	Bahamas	24.49	
18	Alejandro Siqueiros	Mexico	24.53	
19	Carlos Vivero	Colombia	24.58	
20	Kieran Locke	Virgin Islands	24.59	
21	Naji Ferguson	Grenada	25.02	
22	Horacio Carcamo	Honduras	25.05	
23	Kian Ashby	Grenada	25.24	
24	Travis Forte	Jamaica	25.27	
25	Brad Hamilton	Jamaica	25.61	
26	Jonathan Calderon	Saint Lucia	25.98	
27	Joel Refos	Suriname	26.04	
28	Brett Fraser	Cayman Islands	26.08	
29	Stephenson Wallace	Saint Vincent and the Grenadines	27.00	
--	Rodion Davelaar	Netherlands Antilles	DNS	
