= Swimming at the 2005 World Aquatics Championships – Men's 50 metre butterfly =

Men's 50m Butterfly at the 2005 FINA World Aquatics Championships
- Dates: 26 July 2005 (preliminaries and semifinals); 27 July 2005 (final)
- Competitors: 108 from 83 nations
- Winning time: 22.96 WR

Medalists
gold medal	Roland Schoeman	South Africa
silver medal	Ian Crocker	United States
bronze medal	Sergiy Breus	Ukraine

The Men's 50 Butterfly event at the 11th FINA World Aquatics Championships swam 26–-27 July 2005 in Montreal, Canada. Preliminary and Semifinal heats swam on 26 July, with the Final on 27 July.

Prior to the competition, the existing World (WR) and Championship (CR) records were:

- WR: 23.30 swum by Ian Crocker (United States) on 29 Feb 2004 in Swimming at the 2004 Big 12 Time Trials, Austin, United States.
- CR: 23.43 swum by Matt Welsh (Australia) on 21 Jul 2003 in Swimming at the 2003 FINA World Aquatic Championships Barcelona, Spain.

== Results ==
=== Final ===
Place	Swimmer	Nation	Time	Notes
1	Roland Schoeman	South Africa	22.96	WR
2	Ian Crocker	USA	23.12	
3	Sergiy Breus	Ukraine	23.38	
4	Ryk Neethling	South Africa	23.48	
5	Fernando Scherer	Brazil	23.74	
6	Evgeny Korotyshkin	Russia	23.84	
7	Duje Draganja	Croatia	23.96	
8	Mike Mintenko	Canada	23.99	

=== Semifinals ===
Rank	Heat+Lane	Swimmer	Nation	Time	Notes
1	S1 L4	Roland Schoeman	South Africa	23.01	q, WR
2	S2 L4	Ian Crocker	USA	23.32	q
3	S1 L5	Sergiy Breus	Ukraine	23.53	q
4	S1 L3	Fernando Scherer	Brazil	23.55	q
5	S2 L5	Ryk Neethling	South Africa	23.62	q
6	S1 L2	Duje Draganja	Croatia	23.71	q
7	S2 L3	Evgeny Korotyshkin	Russia	23.82	q
8	S2 L2	Mike Mintenko	Canada	23.85	q
9	S1 L7	Oliver Wenzel	Germany	23.93	
10	S1 L8	Milorad Čavić	Serbia and Montenegro	24.03	
10	S2 L1	Nikolay Skvortsov	Russia	24.03	
12	S1 L6	Thomas Rupprath	Germany	24.04	
13	S1 L1	Thomas Kindler	Canada	24.07	
14	S2 L6	Jakob Andkjær	Denmark	24.09	
15	S2 L8	Frédérick Bousquet	France	24.14	
16	S2 L7	Andriy Serdinov	Ukraine	24.18	

=== Preliminaries ===
Rank	Heat+Lane	Swimmer	Nation	Time	Notes
1	H14 L4	Ian Crocker	United States	23.50	q
2	H11 L7	Roland Schoeman	South Africa	23.57	q
3	H14 L3	Ryk Neethling	South Africa	23.74	q
4	H14 L2	Sergiy Breus	Ukraine	23.77	q
5	H14 L5	Evgeny Korotyshkin	Russia	23.87	q
6	H12 L3	Fernando Scherer	Brazil	23.96	q
6	H13 L2	Jakob Andkjær	Denmark	23.96	q
8	H13 L4	Thomas Rupprath	Germany	24.07	q
9	H13 L7	Mike Mintenko	Canada	24.08	q
9	H14 L1	Duje Draganja	Croatia	24.08	q
11	H13 L3	Andriy Serdinov	Ukraine	24.09	q
12	H12 L5	Oliver Wenzel	Germany	24.10	q
13	H14 L6	Nikolay Skvortsov	Russia	24.11	q
14	H12 L7	Thomas Kindler	Canada	24.15	q
14	H13 L6	Frédérick Bousquet	France	24.15	q
16	H12 L6	Kaio Almeida	Brazil	24.22	swim-off
16	H14 L7	Milorad Čavić	Serbia and Montenegro	24.22	swim-off, q
18	H12 L2	Ryo Takayasu	Japan	24.23	
19	H11 L4	Jernej Godec	Slovenia	24.25	
20	H12 L8	Ryan Pini	Papua New Guinea	24.35	
21	H10 L7	Jayme Cramer	United States	24.36	
22	H13 L5	Brett Hawke	Australia	24.45	
23	H11 L3	Matt Welsh	Australia	24.46	
24	H14 L8	Matti Rajakylä	Finland	24.51	
25	H10 L5	Örn Arnarson	Iceland	24.56	
25	H12 L4	Corney Swanepoel	New Zealand	24.56	
27	H11 L1	Hjoertur Mar Reynisson	Iceland	24.83	
28	H10 L1	Jose Mafio	Uruguay	24.90	
29	H11 L2	Jernej Mencinger	Slovenia	24.96	
30	H12 L1	Rustam Khudiyev	Kazakhstan	24.98	
31	H10 L8	Georgi Palazov	Bulgaria	25.05	
31	H13 L8	Matias Aguilera	Argentina	25.05	
33	H9 L4	Roman Krolov	Estonia	25.08	
34	H11 L8	Ravil Nachev	Uzbekistan	25.11	
35	H9 L6	Lukas Harnol	Czech Republic	25.13	
36	H8 L6	Paulius Viktoravicius	Lithuania	25.17	
37	H8 L3	Jeong Nam Yu	South Korea	25.20	
38	H10 L4	Hidemasa Sano	Japan	25.23	
39	H10 L6	Michal Rubáček	Czech Republic	25.25	
40	H11 L5	Moss Burmester	New Zealand	25.27	
41	H9 L7	Ľuboš Križko	Slovakia	25.36	
42	H8 L5	Stavros Michailidis	Cyprus	25.41	
42	H10 L3	Oleg Lyashko	Uzbekistan	25.41	
44	H11 L6	Andy Wibowo	Indonesia	25.43	
45	H6 L7	Erez Feren	Israel	25.47	
46	H9 L2	Jacinto Ayala	Dominican Republic	25.50	
47	H7 L4	Gordon Touw Ngie Tjouw	Suriname	25.64	
48	H8 L4	Wing Cheun Wong	Macau	25.65	
49	H9 L3	Nadav Kochavi	Israel	25.69	
50	H8 L7	Shawn Clarke	Barbados	25.80	
51	H8 L1	Mansoor Al-Mansoor	Kuwait	25.82	
51	H9 L1	Romāns Miloslavskis	Latvia	25.82	
53	H8 L8	Michael O'Connor	Bermuda	25.84	
54	H8 L2	Stepan Pinciuc	Moldova	25.85	
55	H7 L6	Aghiles Slimani	Algeria	25.86	
56	H6 L3	Julio Galofre	Colombia	25.89	
57	H9 L5	Jason Dunford	Kenya	25.92	
58	H6 L8	Kuan Fong Lao	Macau	25.96	
59	H5 L4	Josh Laban	Virgin Islands	26.16	
60	H4 L2	James Walsh	Philippines	26.22	
61	H9 L8	Cheng Xun Ng	Singapore	26.27	
62	H6 L5	Rama Vyombo	Kenya	26.28	
63	H7 L5	Yong Chung	South Korea	26.33	
64	H6 L2	Miguel Navarro	Bolivia	26.37	
65	H4 L4	Zurab Khoasuridze	Georgia	26.38	
66	H6 L1	Gregory Arkhurst	Ivory Coast	26.43	
67	H5 L8	Basil Kaaki	Lebanon	26.52	
68	H6 L6	Daniel Carrillo	Paraguay	26.58	
69	H6 L4	Bader Almuhana	Saudi Arabia	26.63	
69	H7 L7	Jeffrey Su	Singapore	26.63	
71	H4 L6	Sean Dehere	Barbados	26.66	
72	H5 L7	Erik Rajohnson	Madagascar	26.67	
73	H4 L7	Rodrigo Díaz	Guatemala	26.72	
74	H7 L1	Fernando Medrano	Nicaragua	26.85	
75	H7 L3	Nguyen Thanh Hai	Vietnam	26.89	
76	H1 L6	Yan Lin Aung	Myanmar	26.90	
77	H5 L3	Brad Hamilton	Jamaica	26.93	
78	H4 L5	Marc Dansou	Benin	26.97	
79	H4 L1	Khaly Ciss	Senegal	27.01	
79	H5 L1	Tunui Cowan	Tahiti	27.01	
81	H4 L8	Alexander Ray	Namibia	27.07	
82	H5 L6	Matias Rementeria Perez	Uruguay	27.09	
83	H1 L2	Tamatoa Ellacott	Tahiti	27.10	
84	H5 L5	Scott Hensley	Virgin Islands	27.11	
85	H3 L3	Rony Bakale	Republic of the Congo	27.16	
85	H5 L2	Madicke Mbengue	Senegal	27.16	
87	H4 L3	Sunny Ayejoh	Nigeria	27.17	
88	H3 L8	Alain Brigion-Tobe	Cameroon	27.62	
89	H3 L5	Marcelo Alba	Bolivia	27.80	
90	H7 L8	Milinda Wickramasinghe	Sri Lanka	27.87	
91	H3 L4	Connor Keith	Guam	28.07	
92	H1 L1	Earlando McRae	Guyana	28.26	
93	H2 L4	Reginaldo Panting	Honduras	28.43	
94	H2 L5	Hesham Fadhul	Bahrain	28.50	
95	H1 L8	Aung Kyaw Moe	Myanmar	28.62	
96	H3 L1	Jonathan Calderon	Saint Lucia	28.86	
97	H1 L3	Tony D. Augustine	Federated States of Micronesia	29.56	
98	H2 L6	Sadeq Damrah	Palestine	30.24	
99	H2 L7	Ian Taylor	Marshall Islands	30.29	
100	H2 L2	Gilbert Kaburu	Uganda	30.41	
101	H1 L7	Kerson Hadley	Federated States of Micronesia	30.50	
102	H2 L8	Joshua Marfleet	Samoa	33.35	
103	H1 L4	Hassan Shah	Maldives	34.74	
-	H3 L2	Bayarerdene Soninerdene	Mongolia	DQ	
-	H1 L5	Gibrilla Bamba	Sierra Leone	DNS	
-	H2 L1	Kodjovi Mawuena Kowouvi	Togo	DNS	
-	H2 L3	Leonel Matonse	Mozambique	DNS	
-	H3 L6	Ibrahim Maliki Amadou	Niger	DNS	
-	H3 L7	Remigio Chilanle	Mozambique	DNS	
-	H7 L2	Ahmed Md Jewel	Bangladesh	DNS	
-	H10 L2	Ahmed Salah	Egypt	DNS	
-	H13 L1	Alexei Puninski	Croatia	DNS	

Swim-off for 16th Results from the swim-off for 16th place, between Milorad Cavic and Kaio Almeida were:

- 24.02 – Milorad Cavic (Serbia & Montenegro)
- 24.22 – Kaio Almeida (Brazil)
