= 2010 FINA World Swimming Championships (25 m) – Men's 100 metre butterfly =

Men's 100m Butterfly at the 2010 Short Course Worlds
- Dates: 15 December 2010 (heats and semifinals); 16 December 2010 (final)
- Competitors: 92
- Winning time: 50.23

Medalists
| gold medal | Yevgeny Korotyshkin | Russia |
| silver medal | Albert Subirats | Venezuela |
| bronze medal | Kaio Almeida | Brazil |

The Men's 100 Butterfly at the 10th FINA World Swimming Championships (25m) was swum 15–16 December 2010 in Dubai, United Arab Emirates. On 15 December, 92 individuals swam the Preliminary heats in the morning, with the top-16 finishers advancing to the Semifinals that evening. The top-8 finishers from the Semifinal then advanced to the Final then next evening.

At the start of the event, the existing World (WR) and Championship records (CR) were:

| | Name | Nation | Time | Location | Date |
|---|---|---|---|---|---|
| WR | Evgeny Korotyshkin | Russia | 48.48 | Berlin | 15 November 2009 |
| CR | Peter Mankoc | Slovenia | 50.04 | Manchester | 10 April 2008 |

== Results ==
=== Heats ===
| Rank | Heat | Lane | Name | Time | Notes |
|---|---|---|---|---|---|
| 1 | 10 | 1 | Jason Dunford (KEN) | 50.38 | Q |
| 2 | 9 | 4 | Albert Subirats (VEN) | 50.63 | Q |
| 3 | 11 | 2 | Konrad Czerniak (POL) | 50.70 | Q |
| 4 | 12 | 5 | Masayuki Kishida (JPN) | 50.85 | Q |
| 5 | 12 | 6 | Tyler McGill (USA) | 50.91 | Q |
| 6 | 9 | 6 | Geoff Huegill (AUS) | 50.93 | Q |
| 7 | 12 | 4 | Yevgeny Korotyshkin (RUS) | 50.95 | Q |
| 8 | 11 | 4 | Peter Mankoč (SVN) | 51.03 | Q |
| 8 | 11 | 6 | Lars Frölander (SWE) | 51.03 | Q |
| 10 | 10 | 3 | Kaio de Almeida (BRA) | 51.14 | Q |
| 11 | 10 | 2 | Nikita Konovalov (RUS) | 51.16 | Q |
| 12 | 11 | 5 | Joeri Verlinden (NED) | 51.17 | Q |
| 13 | 10 | 6 | Chris Wright (AUS) | 51.35 | Q |
| 13 | 11 | 3 | Ryo Takayasu (JPN) | 51.35 | Q |
| 15 | 11 | 7 | Tim Phillips (USA) | 51.45 | Q |
| 16 | 2 | 1 | László Cseh (HUN) | 51.51 | Q |
| 17 | 10 | 4 | Ivan Lendjer (SER) | 51.54 | |
| 18 | 12 | 3 | Benjamin Starke (GER) | 51.55 | |
| 19 | 1 | 6 | Wu Peng (CHN) | 51.62 | |
| 20 | 10 | 6 | Glauber Silva (BRA) | 51.68 | |
| 21 | 10 | 5 | Steffen Deibler (GER) | 51.72 | |
| 21 | 12 | 7 | Mario Todorović (CRO) | 51.72 | |
| 23 | 7 | 6 | Marcin Cieślak (POL) | 51.80 | |
| 24 | 8 | 8 | Fabien Gilot (FRA) | 51.87 | |
| 25 | 12 | 2 | Jan Šefl (CZE) | 51.88 | |
| 26 | 2 | 2 | Chen Weiwu (CHN) | 51.94 | |
| 27 | 7 | 5 | Joe Bartoch (CAN) | 52.05 | |
| 28 | 12 | 1 | Duarte Mourão (POR) | 52.23 | |
| 29 | 9 | 2 | Dinko Jukić (AUT) | 52.32 | |
| 30 | 1 | 5 | Alon Mandel (ISR) | 52.34 | |
| 31 | 12 | 8 | Rustam Khudiyev (KAZ) | 52.36 | |
| 32 | 1 | 4 | Clément Lefert (FRA) | 52.54 | |
| 32 | 8 | 7 | Rafael Muñoz Pérez (ESP) | 52.54 | |
| 34 | 11 | 1 | Andrejs Dūda (LAT) | 52.57 | |
| 35 | 9 | 7 | Dominik Straga (CRO) | 52.58 | |
| 36 | 8 | 3 | Garth Virgil Tune (RSA) | 52.70 | |
| 37 | 11 | 8 | Martin Spitzer (AUT) | 52.78 | |
| 38 | 8 | 4 | Paolo Facchinelli (ITA) | 52.81 | |
| 39 | 6 | 3 | Velimir Stjepanović (SRB) | 53.09 | |
| 40 | 9 | 1 | Joshua McLeod (TRI) | 53.15 | |
| 41 | 9 | 8 | Octavio Alesi (VEN) | 53.16 | |
| 42 | 7 | 4 | Hsu Chi-Chieh (TPE) | 53.29 | |
| 43 | 8 | 2 | Gustavo Paschetta (ARG) | 53.32 | |
| 44 | 9 | 3 | Elvis Burrows (BAH) | 53.40 | |
| 45 | 7 | 1 | Norbert Trudman (SVK) | 53.51 | |
| 46 | 7 | 8 | Harawan Hellal (EGY) | 53.55 | |
| 47 | 8 | 6 | Julio Galofre (COL) | 53.67 | |
| 48 | 9 | 5 | Nuno Quintanilha (POR) | 53.73 | |
| 49 | 8 | 5 | Michal Navara (SVK) | 54.12 | |
| 50 | 7 | 7 | Aleksey Derlyugov (UZB) | 54.31 | |
| 51 | 5 | 5 | Mauricio Fiol (PER) | 54.42 | |
| 52 | 7 | 2 | Alexander Broberg Skeltved (NOR) | 54.51 | |
| 53 | 6 | 4 | Grant Beahan (ZIM) | 54.53 | |
| 54 | 6 | 1 | Dávid Verrasztó (HUN) | 54.61 | |
| 55 | 6 | 6 | Alexandre Bakhtiarov (CYP) | 54.63 | |
| 56 | 6 | 5 | Yousef Alaskari (KUW) | 54.85 | |
| 57 | 6 | 8 | Saeed Malekae Ashtiani (IRI) | 54.96 | |
| 58 | 5 | 7 | Javier Hernández (HON) | 55.71 | |
| 59 | 5 | 4 | Rehan Jehangir Poncha (IND) | 55.84 | |
| 60 | 8 | 1 | Vo Thai Nguyen (VIE) | 56.07 | |
| 61 | 4 | 3 | Pedro Miguel Pinotes (ANG) | 56.33 | |
| 61 | 6 | 2 | Obaid Al-Jasmi (UAE) | 56.33 | |
| 63 | 5 | 1 | Jean Luis Apolinar Gómez Nuñez (DOM) | 56.40 | |
| 64 | 4 | 4 | Andrew Chetcuti (MLT) | 56.98 | |
| 65 | 5 | 6 | Edvin Angjeli (ALB) | 57.37 | |
| 66 | 4 | 1 | Quinton Delie (NAM) | 57.48 | |
| 67 | 5 | 3 | Yellow Yeiyah (NGR) | 57.74 | |
| 68 | 4 | 6 | Kevin Avila (GUA) | 57.78 | |
| 69 | 6 | 7 | Bakheet Al Jasmi (UAE) | 57.87 | |
| 70 | 5 | 8 | Sofyan El Gadi (LBA) | 58.16 | |
| 71 | 4 | 7 | Farid Haji-Zada (AZE) | 58.88 | |
| 72 | 4 | 2 | Chong Cheok Kuan (MAC) | 59.18 | |
| 73 | 4 | 8 | Neil Agius (MLT) | 59.34 | |
| 74 | 3 | 4 | Colin Bensadon (GIB) | 1:00.07 | |
| 75 | 3 | 5 | James Sanderson (GIB) | 1:00.20 | |
| 76 | 4 | 5 | Nuno Miguel Rola (ANG) | 1:00.41 | |
| 77 | 3 | 3 | Omar Núñez (NCA) | 1:00.65 | |
| 78 | 5 | 2 | Egzon Braho (ALB) | 1:01.05 | |
| 79 | 3 | 1 | Daniel Joshua Runako (LCA) | 1:01.07 | |
| 80 | 3 | 8 | Edwin Boit (KEN) | 1:01.09 | |
| 81 | 2 | 5 | Julien Brice (LCA) | 1:02.20 | |
| 82 | 3 | 2 | Mark Thompson (ZAM) | 1:02.41 | |
| 83 | 3 | 6 | Adama Ouedraogo (BUR) | 1:02.99 | |
| 84 | 3 | 7 | Anderson Lim Chee Wei (BRU) | 1:03.17 | |
| 85 | 2 | 6 | Lim Jyh Jye (BRU) | 1:03.54 | |
| 86 | 2 | 3 | Khalid Abdulla Baba (BRN) | 1:08.15 | |
| 87 | 2 | 8 | Giordan Harris (MHL) | 1:13.62 | |
| 88 | 2 | 7 | Mohamed Coulibaly (MLI) | 1:16.36 | |
| - | 1 | 3 | Ralph Benjamin Teiko Quaye (GHA) | DNS | |
| - | 2 | 4 | Tano Pierre Claver Atta (CIV) | DNS | |
| - | 7 | 3 | Shaune Fraser (CAY) | DNS | |
| - | 10 | 8 | Robert Žbogar (SLO) | DNS | |

=== Semifinals ===
Semifinal 1

| Rank | Lane | Name | Time | Notes |
|---|---|---|---|---|
| 1 | 4 | Albert Subirats (VEN) | 50.51 | Q |
| 2 | 5 | Masayuki Kishida (JPN) | 50.58 | Q |
| 3 | 2 | Kaio de Almeida (BRA) | 50.62 | Q |
| 4 | 6 | Peter Mankoč (SVN) | 50.90 | Q |
| 5 | 7 | Joeri Verlinden (NED) | 50.91 | Q |
| 6 | 8 | László Cseh (HUN) | 51.29 | |
| 7 | 1 | Ryo Takayasu (JPN) | 51.31 | |
| 8 | 3 | Geoff Huegill (AUS) | 51.68 | |

Semifinal 2

| Rank | Lane | Name | Time | Notes |
|---|---|---|---|---|
| 1 | 5 | Konrad Czerniak (POL) | 50.77 | Q |
| 2 | 6 | Yevgeny Korotyshkin (RUS) | 50.78 | Q |
| 3 | 4 | Jason Dunford (KEN) | 50.98 | Q |
| 4 | 1 | Chris Wright (AUS) | 51.02 | |
| 5 | 3 | Tyler McGill (USA) | 51.15 | |
| 6 | 2 | Lars Frölander (SWE) | 51.42 | |
| 7 | 8 | Tim Phillips (USA) | 51.50 | |
| 8 | 7 | Nikita Konovalov (RUS) | 51.70 | |

=== Final ===
| Rank | Lane | Name | Time | Notes |
|---|---|---|---|---|
| 1st place, gold medalist(s) | 2 | Yevgeny Korotyshkin (RUS) | 50.23 | |
| 2nd place, silver medalist(s) | 4 | Albert Subirats (VEN) | 50.24 | |
| 3rd place, bronze medalist(s) | 3 | Kaio Almeida (BRA) | 50.33 | |
| 4 | 5 | Masayuki Kishida (JPN) | 50.64 | |
| 5 | 6 | Konrad Czerniak (POL) | 50.75 | |
| 6 | 1 | Joeri Verlinden (NED) | 50.78 | |
| 7 | 8 | Jason Dunford (KEN) | 50.79 | |
| 8 | 7 | Peter Mankoc (SLO) | 50.85 | |
