= Swimming at the 2005 World Aquatics Championships – Men's 100 metre butterfly =

Men's 100m Butterfly at the 2005 FINA World Aquatics Championships
- Dates: 29 July 2005 (heats, semifinals); 30 July 2005 (final)
- Competitors: 89 from 65 nations
- Winning time: 50.40 WR

Medalists
gold medal	Ian Crocker	United States
silver medal	Michael Phelps	United States
bronze medal	Andriy Serdinov	Ukraine

The Men's 100 Butterfly at the 2005 FINA World Aquatics Championships was swum 29 – 30 July 2005 in Montreal, Canada. Preliminary and Semifinals heats were held on 29 July, with the top-16 finishers from the Prelims in the mornings advancing to swim again in Semifinals that evening. The top-8 swimmers from the Semifinals then advanced to swim the race a third time in the Final the next evening (30 July).

This race consists of 2 lengths of butterfly, in the long course (50m) pool the event was swum in.

At the start of the event, the existing World (WR) and Championships (CR) records were:

Record	Time	Swimmer	Location	Date
WR	50.76	Ian Crocker, USA	Long Beach, USA	13 July 2004
CR	50.98	Ian Crocker, USA	Barcelona, Spain	26 July 2003

The following records were established during the competition:

Date	Round	Swimmer	Time	WR	CR
July 30	Final	Ian Crocker, USA	50.40	WR	CR

== Results ==
=== Final ===
Place	Swimmer	Nation	Time	Notes
1st place, gold medalist(s)	Ian Crocker	USA	50.40	WR
2nd place, silver medalist(s)	Michael Phelps	USA	51.65	
3rd place, bronze medalist(s)	Andriy Serdinov	Ukraine	52.08	
4	Igor Marchenko	Russia	52.35	
5	Evgeny Korotyshkin	Russia	52.87	
5	Mike Mintenko	Canada	52.87	
7	Kaio Almeida	Brazil	53.13	
8	Ryo Takayasu	Japan	53.28	

=== Semifinals ===
Place	Heat+Lane	Swimmer	Nation	Time	Notes
1	S2 L4	Ian Crocker	USA	51.08	q
2	S1 L4	Michael Phelps	USA	52.02	q
3	S2 L5	Igor Marchenko	Russia	52.23	q
4	S1 L1	Evgeny Korotyshkin	Russia	52.68	q
5	S1 L5	Andriy Serdinov	Ukraine	52.75	q
6	S1 L2	Ryo Takayasu	Japan	52.84	q
7	S2 L2	Kaio Almeida	Brazil	52.92	q
7	S2 L7	Mike Mintenko	Canada	52.92	q
9	S2 L8	Moss Burmester	New Zealand	53.00	
10	S1 L3	Milorad Čavić	Serbia and Montenegro	53.06	
11	S1 L8	Romain Barnier	France	53.17	
12	S2 L3	Thomas Rupprath	Germany	53.20	
13	S1 L6	Gabriel Mangabeira	Brazil	53.25	
14	S1 L7	Ryuichi Shibata	Japan	53.34	
15	S2 L1	Ryan Pini	Papua New Guinea	53.36	
16	S2 L6	Peter Mankoč	Slovenia	53.51	

=== Preliminaries ===
Rank	Heat+Lane	Swimmer	Nation	Time	Notes
1	H11 L4	Ian Crocker	United States	51.19	q
2	H12 L4	Michael Phelps	United States	52.32	q
3	H11 L6	Igor Marchenko	Russia	52.76	q
4	H10 L4	Andriy Serdinov	Ukraine	52.94	q
5	H10 L3	Thomas Rupprath	Germany	53.03	q
6	H11 L5	Milorad Čavić	Serbia and Montenegro	53.07	q
7	H11 L8	Peter Mankoč	Slovenia	53.13	q
8	H12 L5	Gabriel Mangabeira	Brazil	53.15	q
9	H10 L6	Kaio Almeida	Brazil	53.21	q
9	H12 L6	Ryo Takayasu	Japan	53.21	q
11	H11 L2	Mike Mintenko	Canada	53.26	q
12	H12 L1	Ryuichi Shibata	Japan	53.37	q
13	H12 L2	Ryan Pini	Papua New Guinea	53.39	q
14	H10 L5	Evgeny Korotyshkin	Russia	53.41	q
15	H10 L7	Moss Burmester	New Zealand	53.42	q
16	H12 L7	Romain Barnier	France	53.43	q
17	H11 L7	Andrew Richards	Australia	53.55	
18	H12 L3	Corney Swanepoel	New Zealand	53.62	
19	H11 L1	Andrew Lauterstein	Australia	53.74	
20	H10 L1	Ioan Gherghel	Romania	53.77	
21	H10 L2	Denys Sylantyev	Ukraine	54.02	
22	H11 L3	Helge Meeuw	Germany	54.13	
23	H10 L8	Dzianis Silkov	Belarus	54.49	
24	H9 L4	Rustam Khudiyev	Kazakhstan	54.65	
25	H7 L7	Guntars Deicmans	Latvia	54.67	
26	H12 L8	Jakob Andkjær	Denmark	54.72	
27	H9 L6	Georgi Palazov	Bulgaria	54.74	
28	H9 L8	Thomas Kindler	Canada	54.79	
29	H9 L3	Ravil Nachaev	Uzbekistan	54.82	
30	H9 L2	Romāns Miloslavskis	Latvia	54.88	
31	H9 L5	Jernej Mencinger	Slovenia	55.07	
32	H7 L3	Gordon Touw Ngie Tjouw	Suriname	55.12	
33	H8 L1	Roman Krolov	Estonia	55.15	
34	H8 L8	Erez Feren	Israel	55.36	
35	H8 L3	Jeong Nam Yu	South Korea	55.37	
35	H9 L7	Hjoertur Mar Reynisson	Iceland	55.37	
37	H7 L2	Julio Galofre	Colombia	55.46	
38	H6 L6	Jacob Carstensen	Denmark	55.70	
39	H8 L4	Nadav Kochavi	Israel	55.73	
40	H8 L5	Mansoor Al-Mansoor	Kuwait	55.95	
41	H8 L7	Oleg Lyashko	Uzbekistan	56.12	
42	H7 L8	Yong Chung	South Korea	56.20	
43	H7 L1	Wing Cheun Wong	Macau	56.24	
44	H6 L5	Shaune Fraser	Cayman Islands	56.26	
45	H8 L6	Aghiles Slimani	Algeria	56.46	
46	H8 L2	Andy Wibowo	Indonesia	56.57	
47	H5 L4	Jacinto Ayala	Dominican Republic	56.93	
48	H5 L5	Jason Dunford	Kenya	56.95	
49	H4 L6	Miguel Navarro	Bolivia	57.20	
50	H7 L6	Cheng Xun Ng	Singapore	57.41	
51	H5 L3	James Walsh	Philippines	57.59	
51	H6 L1	Waleed Al-Qahtani	Kuwait	57.59	
53	H6 L8	Shawn Clarke	Barbados	57.74	
54	H4 L4	Michael O'Connor	Bermuda	58.02	
55	H6 L7	Nguyen Thanh Hai	Vietnam	58.05	
56	H5 L7	Zurab Khomasuridze	Georgia	58.06	
57	H5 L6	Basil Kaaki	Lebanon	58.10	
58	H6 L3	Gary Tan	Singapore	58.17	
59	H7 L4	Ioannis Drymonakos	Greece	58.33	
60	H7 L5	Chi-Chieh Hsu	Chinese Taipei	58.38	
61	H3 L4	Khaly Ciss	Senegal	58.57	
62	H5 L1	Scott Hensley	Virgin Islands	58.82	
63	H6 L2	Joao Matias	Angola	58.93	
64	H4 L5	Daniel Carrillo	Paraguay	58.96	
65	H5 L8	Bader Almuhana	Saudi Arabia	59.14	
66	H4 L1	Alexander Ray	Namibia	59.19	
67	H6 L4	Édgar Crespo	Panama	59.23	
68	H3 L3	Jared Heine	Marshall Islands	59.30	
69	H3 L5	Sean Ehere	Barbados	59.41	
70	H1 L5	Yan Lin Aung	Myanmar	59.53	
71	H3 L7	Rama Vyombo	Kenya	59.55	
72	H3 L8	Sunny Ayejoh	Nigeria	59.69	
73	H2 L4	Morgan Locke	Virgin Islands	59.84	
74	H4 L3	Brad Hamilton	Jamaica	1:00.13	
75	H4 L2	Fernando Medrano	Nicaragua	1:00.15	
76	H4 L8	Francisco Montenegro	Guatemala	1:00.51	
77	H1 L3	Tamatoa Ellacott	Tahiti	1:00.66	
78	H3 L1	Graham Smith	Bermuda	1:00.71	
79	H3 L6	Tunui Cowan	Tahiti	1:01.03	
80	H3 L2	Reginaldo Panting	Honduras	1:01.09	
81	H2 L5	Marcelo Alba	Bolivia	1:01.78	
82	H4 L7	Antonio Tong	Macau	1:01.96	
83	H2 L3	Hisham Fadhul	Bahrain	1:02.53	
84	H2 L6	Alain Brigion-Tobe	Cameroon	1:04.63	
85	H2 L2	Jonathan Calderon	Saint Lucia	1:06.56	
86	H1 L4	Remigio Chilanle	Mozambique	1:08.96	
-	H2 L7	Earlando McRae	Guyana	DQ	
-	H5 L2	Ahmed Md Jewel	Bangladesh	DNS	
-	H9 L1	Ahmed Salah	Egypt	DNS	
