= Swimming at the 2006 Central American and Caribbean Games – Men's 100 metre butterfly =

The men's 100m Butterfly event at the 2006 Central American and Caribbean Games took place on Friday, July 21, 2006, at the S.U. Pedro de Heredia Aquatic Complex in Cartagena, Colombia.

At the time of the event, the following records were in place:

- World Record: 50.40, set by Ian Crocker (USA), on July 30, 2007, in Montreal, Canada.
- Games Record: 53.86, set by Francisco Sánchez (Venezuela), 1998 Games in Maracaibo (Aug.12.1998).

== Results ==
=== Final ===
Place	Swimmer	Country	Time	Note
1	Albert Subirats	Venezuela	52.39	GR
2	Pablo Marmolejo	Mexico	54.63	
3	Jeremy Knowles	Bahamas	54.70	
4	Julio Galofre	Colombia	54.98	
5	Manuel Sotomayor	Mexico	55.44	
6	Luis Rojas	Venezuela	55.59	
7	Douglas Lennox-Silva	Puerto Rico	55.74	
8	Jorge Arturo Arce Aita	Costa Rica	56.17	

=== Preliminaries ===
Rank	Swimmer	Country	Time	Note
1	Albert Subirats	Venezuela	54.60	Q
2	Pablo Marmolejo	Mexico	55.07	Q
3	Julio Galofre	Colombia	55.33	Q
4	Jeremy Knowles	Bahamas	55.47	Q
5	Manuel Sotomayor	Mexico	55.73	Q
6	Luis Rojas	Venezuela	55.78	Q
7	Douglas Lennox-Silva	Puerto Rico	56.25	Q
8	Jorge Arturo Arce	Costa Rica	56.27	Q
9	Roy Felipe Barahona Fuentes	Honduras	57.55	
10	Brad Hamilton	Jamaica	57.64	
11	Javier Hernández Maradiaga	Honduras	58.27	
12	Elvis Burrows	Bahamas	58.68	
13	Anthony Schamber	Trinidad and Tobago	59.76	
14	Scott Hensley	Virgin Islands	1:00.45	
15	Travis Forte	Jamaica	1:00.59	
16	Marcelino Richaards	Suriname	1:01.04	
17	Naji Ferguson	Grenada	1:01.69	
18	Shawn Clarke	Barbados	1:04.57	
--	Jacinto Ayala	Dominican Republic	DNS	
--	Édgar Crespo	Panama	DNS	
--	Shaune Fraser	Cayman Islands	DNS	
--	Morgan Locke	Virgin Islands	DQ	
