= Swimming at the 2014 South American Games – Men's 100 metre butterfly =

Men's 100 metre butterfly at the 2014 South American Games
- Venue: Estadio Nacional
- Dates: March 9, 2014 (heats & finals)
- Competitors: 17 from 10 nations
- Winning time: 52.26

Medalists
gold medal	Albert Subirats	Venezuela
silver medal	Mauricio Fiol	Peru
bronze medal	Fernando Silva	Brazil

The men's 100 metre butterfly competition at the 2014 South American Games took place on March 9 at the Estadio Nacional. The last champion was Albert Subirats of Venezuela.

This race consisted of two lengths of the pool, all in butterfly.

== Records ==
Prior to this competition, the existing world and Pan Pacific records were as follows:

World record	Michael Phelps (USA)	49.82	Rome, Italy	August 1, 2009
South American Games record	Albert Subirats (VEN)	52.86	Medellín, Colombia	March 28, 2010

== Results ==
All times are in minutes and seconds.

KEY:	q	Fastest non-qualifiers	Q	Qualified	CR	Championships record	NR	National record	PB	Personal best	SB	Seasonal best

=== Heats ===
The first round was held on March 9, at 11:34.

Rank	Heat	Lane	Name	Nationality	Time	Notes
1	1	5	Marcos Barale	Argentina	54.13	Q
2	3	4	Albert Subirats	Venezuela	54.17	Q
3	1	4	Nicholas Santos	Brazil	54.36	Q
4	3	3	Andres Montoya	Colombia	54.60	Q
5	2	5	Fernando Silva	Brazil	54.81	Q
6	2	4	Mauricio Fiol	Peru	54.89	Q
6	3	5	Benjamin Hockin	Paraguay	54.89	Q
8	2	6	Joaquin Belza	Argentina	55.54	Q
9	1	6	Zuhayr Pigot	Suriname	55.58	
10	2	3	Maximiliano Abreu	Paraguay	55.77	
11	3	6	Cristian Delgado	Venezuela	55.83	
12	1	3	Julio Galofre	Colombia	56.10	
13	3	2	Tyrone Alvarado Cervantes	Ecuador	56.48	
14	2	2	Joaquin Sepulveda Parra	Chile	57.02	
15	1	2	Byron Franco Zambrano	Ecuador	58.27	
16	2	7	Aldo Castillo Sulca	Bolivia	58.35	
17	3	7	Javier Vazquez Gonzalez	Chile	58.39	

=== Final ===
The final was held on March 9, at 18:48.

Rank	Lane	Name	Nationality	Time	Notes
1st place, gold medalist(s)	5	Albert Subirats	Venezuela	52.26	CR
2nd place, silver medalist(s)	1	Mauricio Fiol	Peru	53.24	
3rd place, bronze medalist(s)	2	Fernando Silva	Brazil	53.88	
4	6	Andres Montoya	Colombia	53.97	
5	4	Marcos Barale	Argentina	54.14	
6	3	Nicholas Santos	Brazil	54.34	
7	7	Benjamin Hockin	Paraguay	54.50	
8	8	Joaquin Belza	Argentina	55.37	
