= Swimming at the 2006 Central American and Caribbean Games – Men's 4x100 metre medley relay =

The men's 4 × 100 m Medley Relay event at the 2006 Central American and Caribbean Games occurred on Saturday, July 22, 2006 at the S.U. Pedro de Heredia Aquatic Complex in Cartagena, Colombia.

Only 8 relays were entered in the event, and consequently, it was only swum once (in finals).

Records at the time of the event were:

- World Record: 3:30.68, (United States) USA (Peirsol, Hansen, Crocker, Lezak), Athens, Greece, August 21, 2004.
- Games Record: 3:44.61, Cuba (Falcón, González, Garcia, Hernandez), 1998 Games in Maracaibo (Aug.14.1998).

== Results ==
Place	Country	Swimmers	Time	Note
1	Venezuela	Albert Subirats; Rohan Ian Pinto Ramnarine; Octavio Alesi Gonzlez; Luis Rojas	3:45.98	NR
2	Mexico	Jose Enrique Bayata Villa; Alfredo Jacobo; Pablo Marmolejo; Juan Yeh	3:46.12	
3	Barbados	Nicholas Neckles; Andrei Cross; Bradley Ally; Terrence Haynes	3:48.65	NR
4	Colombia	Omar Pinzón; Diego Bonilla; Julio Galofre; Sebastián Arango	3:48.95	NR
5	Guatemala	Juan Montenegro Abascal; Alvaro Fortuny; Rodrigo Díaz; Evan Marcus	3:59.78	
6	Virgin Islands	Kieran Locke; Kevin Hensley; Josh Laban; Morgan Locke	4:02.12	
7	Honduras	Javier Hernandez Maradiaga; Juan Ramon Lopez Valadares; Roy Felipe Barahona Fuentes; Horacio Humberto Carcamo Saldago	4:06.44	
8	Jamaica	Travis Forte; Dominic Lee; Brad Hamilton; Jonathon Wong	4:06.46	
