= Swimming at the 2006 Central American and Caribbean Games – Men's 4x100 metre freestyle relay =

The men's 4 × 100 m Freestyle Relay event at the 2006 Central American and Caribbean Games occurred on Wednesday, July 19, 2006, at the S.U. Pedro de Heredia Aquatic Complex in Cartagena, Colombia.

Only 8 relays were entered in the event, and consequently, it was only swum once (in finals).

Records at the time of the event were:

- World Record: 3:13.17, South Africa (Schoeman, Ferns, Townsend, Neethling), Athens, Greece, August 15, 2004.
- Games Record: 3:23.49, Venezuela (Quevedo, Paez, Rojas, Sánchez), 1998 Games in Maracaibo (Aug.18.1998).

== Results ==
Place	Country	Swimmers	Time	Note
1	Venezuela	Albert Subirats; Crox Acuña; Octavio Alesi Gonzalez; Luis Rojas	3:22.58	GR
2	Mexico	Jose Manuel Sotomayor Landecho; Juan Yeh; Alejandro Siqueiros Quiroz; Ivan de Jesus Lopez Ramos	3:25.85	NR
3	Puerto Rico	Raúl Martínez Colomer; Arsenio Lopez; Douglas Lennox-Silva; Ricardo Busquets	3:27.76	
4	Barbados	Terrence Haynes; Martyn Forde; Shawn Clarke; Bradley Ally	3:29.74	NR
5	Colombia	Carlos Vivero; Daniel Cuellar; Sebastián Arango; Guillermo Ramírez	3:30.35	
6	Jamaica	Dominic Lee; Jonathon Wong; Travis Forte; Brad Hamilton	3:34.12	NR
7	Trinidad and Tobago	Nicholas Bovell; Anthony Schamber; John Littlepage; George Bovell	3:34.66	
8	Virgin Islands	Kieran Locke; Branden Whitehurst; Morgan Locke; Josh Laban	3:35.38	
