= Swimming at the 2007 Pan American Games – Men's 100 metre butterfly =

The Men's 100m Butterfly event at the 2007 Pan American Games took place at the Maria Lenk Aquatic Park in Rio de Janeiro, Brazil on 16 July, 17 July, and 18 July.

Three first round heats were raced, with a total of 20 swimmers. The fastest 16 swimmers from this group qualified to move on to the semifinals stage. The 16 swimmers who advanced then raced in two semifinals of eight swimmers each, the results being pooled and the fastest eight swimmers advancing to the final.

== Medalists ==
Gold	Kaio Almeida; Brazil
Silver	Gabriel Mangabeira; Brazil
Bronze	Albert Subirats; Venezuela

== Records ==
Record	Athlete	Time	Date	Venue
World Record	Ian Crocker (USA)	50.40	2005-07-30	(Canada) Montreal
Pan Am Record	Ben Michaelson (USA)	53.04	2003-08-12	(Dominican Republic) Santo Domingo

== Results ==
Rank	Swimmer	Heats		Semifinals		Final
Rank	Swimmer	Time	Rank	Time	Rank	Time
1	Kaio Almeida (BRA)	53.05	3	53.02	2	52.05
2	Gabriel Mangabeira (BRA)	53.21	4	52.94	1	52.43
3	Albert Subirats (VEN)	54.05	9	53.02	2	52.78
4	Octavio Alesi (VEN)	52.54	1	53.46	6	52.95
5	Ricky Berens (USA)	53.01	2	53.66	8	52.98
6	Joe Bartoch (CAN)	53.94	8	53.32	4	53.18
7	Adam Sioui (CAN)	53.62	7	53.52	7	53.47
8	Pat O'Neil (USA)	53.40	5	53.44	5	53.49
9	Juan Veloz (MEX)	53.59	6	53.99		
10	Jeremy Knowles (BAH)	54.54	10	54.11		
11	Nicholas Bovell (TRI)	54.75	13	54.97		
12	Camillo Becerra (COL)	54.58	11	55.02		
13	Emmanuel Crescimbeni (PER)	55.16	14	55.11		
14	Julio Galofre (COL)	55.34	15	55.50		
15	Gordon Touw Ngie Tjouw (SUR)	54.71	12	55.61		
16	Mariano Caviglia (ARG)	55.59	16	55.73		
17	Jorge Arce (CRC)	56.57				
18	Brad Hamilton (JAM)	57.07				
19	Roy Barahona (HON)	57.20				
20	Gaston Rodriguez (ARG)	57.92				
