= 2010 FINA World Swimming Championships (25 m) – Men's 50 metre butterfly =

Men's 50m Butterfly at the 2010 Short Course Worlds
- Dates: 17 December 2010 (heats and semifinals); 18 December 2010 (final)
- Competitors: 119
- Winning time: 22.40

Medalists
gold medal	Albert Subirats	Venezuela
silver medal	Andrii Govorov	Ukraine
bronze medal	Steffen Deibler	Germany

The Men's 50 Butterfly at the 10th FINA World Swimming Championships (25m) was swum 17–18 December 2010 in Dubai, United Arab Emirates. On 17 December 119 individuals swam in the Preliminary heats in the morning, with the top-16 finishers advancing to swim again in the Semifinals that evening. The top-8 from the Semifinals then advanced to swim the Final the next evening.

At the start of the event, the existing World (WR) and Championship records (CR) were:

	Name	Nation	Time	Location	Date
WR	Steffen Deibler	Germany	21.80	Berlin	14 November 2009
CR	Adam Pine	Australia	22.70	Manchester	11 April 2008

The following records were established during the competition:

Date	Round	Name	Nation	Time	WR	CR
17 December 2010	Semifinals	Steffen Deibler	Germany	22.57		CR
18 December 2010	Final	Albert Subirats	Venezuela	22.40		CR

== Results ==
=== Heats ===
Rank	Heat	Lane	Name	Time	Notes
1	12	2	Albert Subirats (VEN)	22.79	Q
2	14	8	Jason Dunford (KEN)	22.80	Q
3	13	6	Glauber Silva (BRA)	22.85	Q
4	14	5	Nicholas Santos (BRA)	22.87	Q
5	14	6	Geoff Huegill (AUS)	22.92	Q
6	15	5	Masayuki Kishida (JPN)	22.98	Q
7	15	6	Andrii Govorov (UKR)	23.05	Q
8	15	4	Steffen Deibler (GER)	23.10	Q
9	1	7	Wu Peng (CHN)	23.12	Q
9	13	3	Nikita Konovalov (RUS)	23.12	Q
11	12	1	Tyler McGill (USA)	23.16	Q
12	13	4	Roland Schoeman (RSA)	23.22	Q
12	15	1	Mario Todorović (CRO)	23.22	Q
14	13	2	Rafael Muñoz (ESP)	23.25	Q
15	15	7	Lars Frölander (SWE)	23.27	Q
16	14	4	Evgeny Korotyshkin (RUS)	23.35	Q
17	12	5	Graeme Moore (RSA)	23.36	
18	13	5	Joeri Verlinden (NED)	23.37	
19	2	7	Alon Mandel (ISR)	23.39	
20	2	5	Chen Weiwu (CHN)	23.40	
21	13	1	Tim Phillips (USA)	23.47	
22	15	2	Martin Spitzer (AUT)	23.48	
23	14	1	Chris Wright (AUS)	23.49	
24	15	3	Ivan Lendjer (SRB)	23.52	
25	12	4	Aleksander Hetland (NOR)	23.53	
26	12	7	Octavio Alesi (VEN)	23.55	
27	13	7	Paolo Facchinelli (ITA)	23.57	
28	14	7	Andrejs Dūda (LAT)	23.74	
29	14	3	Michal Rubáček (CZE)	23.77	
30	13	8	Joshua McLeod (TRI)	23.78	
31	14	2	Ryo Takayasu (JPN)	23.83	
32	12	8	Victor Vabishchevich (BLR)	23.87	
33	11	4	Rustam Khudiyev (KAZ)	23.88	
34	11	3	Joe Bartoch (CAN)	23.89	
35	12	3	Elvis Burrows (BAH)	23.96	
36	10	5	Roman Kucik (SVK)	24.01	
36	11	6	Gustavo Paschetta (ARG)	24.01	
38	10	4	Robert Zgobar (SLO)	24.06	
38	12	6	Michal Navara (SVK)	24.06	
40	11	2	Romāns Miloslavskis (LAT)	24.08	
41	11	5	Ryan Pini (PNG)	24.19	
42	2	3	Daniel Coakley (PHI)	24.23	
43	10	7	Serghei Golban (MDA)	24.25	
44	10	2	Hsu Chi-Chieh (TPE)	24.40	
45	11	7	Jan Šefl (CZE)	24.45	
45	15	8	Omar Pinzón (COL)	24.45	
47	8	5	Velimir Stjepanović (SRB)	24.56	
48	10	1	Marawan Hellal (EGY)	24.60	
49	8	4	Grant Beahan (ZIM)	24.62	
50	9	2	Andres Montoya (COL)	24.63	
51	11	8	Chan Wing Lim Eric (HKG)	24.65	
52	10	6	Alexandre Bakhtiarov (CYP)	24.72	
53	9	4	Ramadhan Vyombo (KEN)	24.74	
54	9	6	Pjotr Degtjarjov (EST)	24.75	
55	9	1	Lao Kuan Fong (MAC)	24.83	
56	8	6	Andrew Chetcuti (MLT)	24.99	
57	10	3	Yellow Yeiyah (NGR)	25.07	
58	7	3	Javier Hernández (HON)	25.20	
59	9	8	Yan Ho Chun (HKG)	25.33	
60	8	2	Mohammed Al Ghaferi (UAE)	25.34	
61	9	7	Édgar Crespo (PAN)	25.39	
62	9	3	Rehan Jehangir Poncha (IND)	25.51	
62	10	8	Timothy Ferris (ZIM)	25.51	
64	8	3	Bakheet Al Jasmi (UAE)	25.78	
65	7	5	Kevin Avila (GUA)	26.01	
66	7	1	José Montoya (CRC)	26.06	
67	7	4	Sofyan El Gadi (LBA)	26.16	
68	9	5	Vo Thai Nguyen (VIE)	26.23	
69	7	7	Hycinth Cijntje (AHO)	26.30	
70	6	6	Mohammed Aqelah (JOR)	26.37	
71	7	6	Chong Cheok Kuan (MAC)	26.44	
72	6	1	Mark Sammut (MLT)	26.55	
73	7	8	Erik Rajohnson (MAD)	26.70	
74	5	5	Martín Tomasin (BOL)	26.72	
75	7	2	Farid Haji-Zada (AZE)	26.73	
76	6	3	Dulguun Batsaikhan (MGL)	26.75	
77	8	7	Abdoul Khadre Mbaye Niane (SEN)	26.81	
78	6	4	Samer Kamal (JOR)	26.92	
79	4	4	Ahmed Ajwad Abdouh Alkarem (IRQ)	26.95	
80	8	8	Gezim Hyka (ALB)	27.17	
81	6	8	Colin Bensadon (GIB)	27.25	
82	5	3	Julien Brice (LCA)	27.32	
82	6	2	Mark Thompson (ZAM)	27.32	
84	3	1	Mohamed Alkhadhuri (OMA)	27.33	
85	2	8	Adama Ouedraogo (BUR)	27.34	
86	5	6	James Sanderson (GIB)	27.38	
87	5	4	Nuno Miguel Rola (ANG)	27.52	
88	5	2	Daniel Joshua Runako (LCA)	27.61	
88	8	1	Egzon Braho (ALB)	27.61	
90	6	7	Andrey Molchanov (TKM)	27.65	
91	5	8	Lim Jyh Jye (BRU)	27.71	
92	4	7	Ronaldo Rodrigues (GUY)	27.91	
93	5	7	Omar Núñez (NCA)	27.91	
94	1	1	Aung Zaw Phyo (MYA)	27.96	
95	1	4	Tepaia Payne (COK)	28.36	
96	4	2	Alejandro Atoigue (GUM)	28.41	
97	4	8	Ahmad Dumairi (PLE)	28.43	
98	4	5	Anderson Lim Chee Wei (BRU)	28.72	
99	4	1	Conrad Gaira (UGA)	28.82	
100	6	5	Tano Pierre Claver Atta (CIV)	28.91	
101	4	3	Muhammad Abbas Hussain (PAK)	29.82	
102	3	3	Inayath Hassan (MDV)	29.86	
103	5	1	Belete Fiseha Hailu (ETH)	29.89	
104	1	5	Ralph Benjamin Teiko Quaye (GHA)	30.00	
105	3	4	Khalid Abdulla Baba (BRN)	30.10	
106	2	4	Dionisio Augustine II (FSM)	30.47	
106	4	6	Ron Albert Roucou (SEY)	30.47	
108	3	7	Chinzigov Alisher (TJK)	30.65	
109	1	3	Rhudii Ayi Mensah Quaye (GHA)	31.01	
110	2	2	Giordan Harris (MHL)	31.21	
111	1	6	Sergey Sihanouvong (LAO)	31.28	
112	3	5	Max Kanyerezi (UGA)	31.37	
113	2	6	Mohamed Coulibaly (MLI)	31.46	
114	3	6	Nelson Masang (PLW)	34.51	
115	3	2	Godonou Wilfrid Tevoedjre (BEN)	35.73	
116	1	2	Sergelen Tegshee (MGL)	42.25	
-	2	1	Teddy Mbolidi (CAF)	DNS	
-	3	8	Kwame Apenteng (GHA)	DNS	
-	11	1	Peter Mankoč (SLO)	DNS	

=== Semifinals ===
Semifinal 1

Rank	Lane	Name	Time	Notes
1	6	Steffen Deibler (GER)	22.57	Q, CR
2	5	Nicholas Santos (BRA)	22.64	Q
3	3	Masayuki Kishida (JPN)	22.88	Q
3	1	Rafael Muñoz (ESP)	22.88	Q
5	7	Roland Schoeman (RSA)	22.98	
6	8	Evgeny Korotyshkin (RUS)	22.99	
6	4	Jason Dunford (KEN)	22.99	
8	2	Nikita Konovalov (RUS)	23.08	

Semifinal 2

Rank	Lane	Name	Time	Notes
1	4	Albert Subirats (VEN)	22.68	Q
2	2	Geoff Huegill (AUS)	22.87	Q
3	5	Andrii Govorov (UKR)	22.93	Q
4	3	Glauber Silva (BRA)	22.93	Q
5	6	Wu Peng (CHN)	22.97	
6	7	Lars Frölander (SWE)	23.08	
7	1	Tyler McGill (USA)	23.21	
8	8	Mario Todorović (CRO)	23.30	

=== Final ===
Rank	Lane	Name	Time	Notes
1st place, gold medalist(s)	3	Albert Subirats (VEN)	22.40	CR
2nd place, silver medalist(s)	1	Andrii Govorov (UKR)	22.43	
3rd place, bronze medalist(s)	4	Steffen Deibler (GER)	22.44	
4	5	Nicholas Santos (BRA)	22.45	
5	6	Geoff Huegill (AUS)	22.75	
6	7	Rafael Muñoz (ESP)	22.77	
7	2	Masayuki Kishida (JPN)	22.79	
8	8	Glauber Silva (BRA)	22.87	
