= Swimming at the 2013 Bolivarian Games =

Swimming (Spanish:Natación), for the 2013 Bolivarian Games, took place from 17 November to 20 November 2013.

== Medal table ==
Key:

* Host nation (Peru)

Rank	Nation	Gold	Silver	Bronze	Total
1	Venezuela (VEN)	23	13	11	47
2	Colombia (COL)	10	14	7	31
3	Ecuador (ECU)	2	4	7	13
4	Paraguay (PAR)	2	4	2	8
5	Chile (CHI)	2	2	1	5
6	Panama (PAN)	1	2	1	4
7	Peru (PER)*	1	1	10	12
Totals (7 entries)		41	40	39	120

== Medal summary ==
=== Men ===
Event	Gold		Silver		Bronze	
50 metre freestyle	Jesús Casanova (VEN); Oliver Elliot (CHI)	23.25			Manuel González (PAN)	23.49
100 metre freestyle	Ben Hockin (PAR)	50.08	Cristian Quintero (VEN)	50.20	Mauricio Fiol (PER)	50.80
200 metre freestyle	Cristian Quintero (VEN)	1:50.10	Ben Hockin (PAR)	1:50.50	Mauricio Fiol (PER)	1:50.64
400 metre freestyle	Cristian Quintero (VEN)	3:54.96	Mateo de Angulo (COL)	3:56.35	Andy Arteta (VEN)	3:56.69
800 metre freestyle	Mateo de Angulo (COL)	8:05.39	Andy Arteta (VEN)	8:05.45	Alejandro Gómez (VEN)	8:07.14
1500 metre freestyle	Esteban Enderica (ECU)	15:24.12	Andy Arteta (VEN)	15:28.00	Mateo de Angulo (COL)	15:33.43
50 metre backstroke	Albert Subirats (VEN)	25.60	Robinson Molina (VEN); Juan Pablo Botero (COL)	26.84		
100 metre backstroke	Charles Hockin (PAR)	56.71	Juan David Molina (COL)	57.18	Luis Rojas (VEN)	57.82
200 metre backstroke	David Cespedes (COL)	2:03.76	Juan David Molina (COL)	2:04.16	Charles Hockin (PAR)	2:05.23
50 metre breaststroke	Édgar Crespo (PAN)	28.75	Jorge Murillo (COL)	28.83	Miguel Ferreira (VEN)	28.91
100 metre breaststroke	Jorge Murillo (COL)	1:01.80	Édgar Crespo (PAN)	1:02.25	Miguel Ferreira (VEN)	1:02.73
200 metre breaststroke	Jorge Murillo (COL)	2:14.68	Édgar Crespo (PAN)	2:19.02	Gerardo Huidobro (PER)	2:19.49
50 metre butterfly	Albert Subirats (VEN)	24.07	Ben Hockin (PAR)	24.39	Mauricio Fiol (PER)	24.80
100 metre butterfly	Albert Subirats (VEN)	52.44	Ben Hockin (PAR)	53.36	Mauricio Fiol (PER)	53.43
200 metre butterfly	Mauricio Fiol (PER)	1:59.24	Marcos Lavado (VEN)	1:59.60	Julio Galofre (COL)	2:01.55
200 metre individual medley	Juan Carlos Sequera (VEN)	2:04.68	Esteban Enderica (ECU)	2:06.54	Christian Orjuela (COL)	2:08.01
400 metre individual medley	Esteban Enderica (ECU)	4:25.41	Juan Carlos Sequera (VEN)	4:30.25	Christian Orjuela (COL)	4:32.07
4 × 100 metre freestyle relay	Venezuela; Albert Subirats; Jesús Daniel Lopez; Roberto Goméz; Cristian Quintero	3:22.13	Paraguay; Matías Basualo; Jose Enmanuel Lobo; Charles Hockin; Ben Hockin	3:26.53	Colombia; Julio Galofre; Mateo de Angulo; Juan Pablo Botero; Alberto Morales	3:26.72
4 × 200 metre freestyle relay	Venezuela; Daniele Tirabassi; Miguel Angel Perez; Luis Rojas; Cristian Quintero	7:27.84	Colombia; Julio Galofre; Alberto Morales; Juan Pablo Botero; Mateo de Angulo	7:28.34 NR	Paraguay; Ben Hockin; Carlos Orihuela; Jose Enmanuel Lobo; Charles Hockin	7:42.57
4 × 100 metre medley relay	Venezuela; Cristian Quintero; Albert Subirats; Miguel Ferreira; Luis Rojas	3:42.19	Colombia; Alberto Morales; Andres Montoya; Jorge Murillo; Juan David Molina	3:45.33	Peru; Nicholas Magana; Mauricio Fiol; Gerardo Huidobro; Daniel Mitsumasu	3:50.32

=== Women ===
Event	Gold		Silver		Bronze	
50 metre freestyle	Wendy Rodríguez (VEN)	26.36	Jeserik Pinto (VEN)	26.51	Yamilé Bahamonde (ECU)	26.64
100 metre freestyle	Jessica Camposano (COL)	56.43	Erika Torreallas (VEN)	56.83	Yamilé Bahamonde (ECU)	57.37
200 metre freestyle	Andreina Pinto (VEN)	2:00.85	Jessica Camposano (COL)	2:02.91	Andrea Cedrón (PER)	2:03.62
400 metre freestyle	Andreina Pinto (VEN)	4:13.93	Kristel Köbrich (CHI)	4:17.09	Andrea Cedrón (PER)	4:19.53
800 metre freestyle	Andreina Pinto (VEN)	8:34.05	Kristel Köbrich (CHI)	8:35.02	Samantha Arévalo (ECU)	8:42.11
1500 metre freestyle	Kristel Köbrich (CHI)	16:10.97	Samantha Arévalo (ECU)	16:49.41	Andrea Cedrón (PER)	17:07.56
50 metre backstroke	Jeserik Pinto (VEN)	29.47	Carolina Colorado Henao (COL)	29.62	Erika Torreallas (VEN)	30.29
100 metre backstroke	Carolina Colorado Henao (COL)	1:02.57	Erika Torreallas (VEN)	1:04.03	Jeserik Pinto (VEN)	1:04.90
200 metre backstroke	Carolina Colorado Henao (COL)	2:18.46	Marcela Gramcko (VEN)	2:21.30	Domenica Vallejo (PER)	2:23.97
50 metre breaststroke	Mercedes Toledo (VEN)	32.75	Salome Cataño (COL)	33.63	Luisa Fernanda Mesa (COL)	34.05
100 metre breaststroke	Mercedes Toledo (VEN)	1:11.30	Karina Vivas (VEN)	1:12.29	Salome Cataño (COL)	1:12.38
200 metre breaststroke	Salome Cataño (COL)	2:33.20 NR	Mercedes Toledo (VEN)	2:34.98	Larismar Arcela (VEN)	2:37.79
50 metre butterfly	Jeserik Pinto (VEN)	27.31	Carolina Colorado Henao (COL)	27.56	Yamilé Bahamonde (ECU)	27.86
100 metre butterfly	Carolina Colorado Henao (COL)	1:00.45	Jessica Camposano (COL)	1:00.80	Jeserik Pinto (VEN)	1:01.55
200 metre butterfly	Andreina Pinto (VEN)	2:15.06	Lizzy Nolasco (PER)	2:20.15	Vanessa Fernandez (VEN)	2:20.50
200 metre individual medley	Andreina Pinto (VEN)	2:18.37	Samantha Arévalo (ECU)	2:18.63	Mercedes Toledo (VEN)	2:23.23
400 metre individual medley	Andreina Pinto (VEN)	4:49.45	Samantha Arévalo (ECU)	4:51.04	Kristel Köbrich (CHI)	5:02.79
4 × 100 metre freestyle relay	Venezuela; Jeserik Pinto; Andreina Pinto; Wendy Rodríguez; Erika Torreallas	3:48.18	Colombia; Carolina Colorado Henao; Laura Galarza; María Muñoz; Jessica Camposano	3:49.73	Ecuador; Sharon Bravo; Nicole Marmol; Samantha Arévalo; Yamilé Bahamonde	3:54.39
4 × 200 metre freestyle relay	Venezuela; Wendy Rodríguez; Yennifer Mendoza; Erika Torreallas; Andreina Pinto	8:24.79	Colombia; Jessica Camposano; Laura Galarza; María Álvarez; María Muñoz	8:31.17	Ecuador; Nicole Marmol; Yamilé Bahamonde; Sharon Bravo; Samantha Arévalo	8:32.53
4 × 100 metre medley relay	Colombia; Carolina Colorado Henao; Salome Cataño; Jessica Camposano; Laura Galarza	4:13.09	Venezuela; Jeserik Pinto; Mercedes Toledo; Erika Torreallas; Andreina Pinto	4:14.35	Ecuador; Nicole Marmol; Samantha Arévalo; Sharon Bravo; Yamilé Bahamonde	4:27.85
