= Swimming at the 2014 South American Games – Men's 4 × 100 metre medley relay =

Men's 4 x 100 metre medley relay at the 2014 South American Games
- Venue: Estadio Nacional
- Dates: March 9, 2014 (heats & finals)
- Winning time: 3:37.95

Medalists
gold medal	Fernando dos Santos, Felipe Lima, Nicholas Santos and Matheus Santana	Brazil
silver medal	Federico Grabich, Gabriel Morelli, Marcos Barale and Matías Aguilera	Argentina
bronze medal	Albert Subirats, Carlos Claverie, Cristian Delgado and Roberto Goméz	Venezuela

The men's 4 x 100 metre medley relay competition at the 2014 South American Games took place on March 9 at the Estadio Nacional. The last champion was Brazil.

== Records ==
Prior to this competition, the existing world and Pan Pacific records were as follows:

World record	United States (USA); Aaron Peirsol (52.19); Eric Shanteau (58.57); Michael Phelps (49.72); David Walters (46.80)	3:27.28	Rome, Italy	August 2, 2009
South American Games record	Brazil (BRA); Guilherme Guido (55.21); Felipe França (1:02.72); Gabriel Mangabeira (55.21); Nicolas Oliveira (50.59)	3:43.73	Medellín, Colombia	March 28, 2010

== Results ==
All times are in minutes and seconds.

KEY:	q	Fastest non-qualifiers	Q	Qualified	CR	Championships record	NR	National record	PB	Personal best	SB	Seasonal best

=== Heats ===
Heats weren't performed, as only eight teams had entered.

=== Final ===
The final was held on March 9, at 19:46.

Rank	Lane	Name	Nationality	Time	Notes
1st place, gold medalist(s)	4	Fernando dos Santos (55.46); Felipe Lima (1:00.50); Nicholas Santos (52.95); Matheus Santana (49.04)	Brazil	3:37.95	CR
2nd place, silver medalist(s)	5	Federico Grabich (55.59); Gabriel Morelli (1:02.42); Marcos Barale (53.58); Matías Aguilera (48.92)	Argentina	3:40.51	NR
3rd place, bronze medalist(s)	6	Albert Subirats (54.57); Carlos Claverie (1:02.19); Cristian Delgado (55.32); Roberto Goméz (50.58)	Venezuela	3:42.66	
4	1	David Céspedes (58.39); Carlos Mahecha (1:02.55); Andres Montoya (54.40); Alberto Morales (50.93)	Colombia	3:46.27	
5	3	Charles Hockin (58.59); Matías López (1:06.90); Maximiliano Abreu (55.32); Ben Hockin (51.33)	Paraguay	3:52.14	
6	2	Gabriel Melconian Alvez (1:00.80); Martin Melconian Alvez (1:02.95); Gabriel Fleitas Lago (58.23); Enzo Martinez Scarpe (51.59)	Uruguay	3:53.57	
7	7	Benjamin Quintanilla Arias (1:00.47); José Galvez Engels (1:08.37); Joaquin Sepulveda Parra (57.28); Oliver Elliot (51.65)	Chile	3:57.77	NR
8	8	Carlos Polit Carvajal (1:00.57); Alex Solorzano Castro (1:08.45); Tyrone Alvarado Cervantes (57.11); Byron Franco Zambrano (56.12)	Ecuador	4:02.25	
