= Swimming at the 2010 South American Games – Men's 100 metre backstroke =

The Men's 100m backstroke event at the 2010 South American Games was held on March 27, with the heats at 11:13 and the Final at 18:25.

== Medalists ==
Gold	Silver	Bronze
Guilherme Guido; Brazil	Federico Grabich; Argentina	Albert Subirats; Venezuela

== Records ==
Standing records prior to the 2010 South American Games
World record	Aaron Peirsol (USA)	51.94	Indianapolis, United States	8 July 2009
Competition Record	Joaquin Belza (ARG)	57.13	Buenos Aires, Argentina	16 November 2006
South American record	Guilherme Guido (BRA)	53.24	Palhoça, Brazil	6 September 2009

== Results ==
=== Heats ===
Rank	Heat	Lane	Athlete	Result	Notes
1	2	4	Federico Grabich (ARG)	56.74	Q CR
2	3	3	Luis Rojas Martinez (VEN)	57.89	Q
3	1	4	Gabriel Mangabeira (BRA)	58.50	Q
4	1	6	Charles Hockin (PAR)	58.83	Q
5	3	4	Guilherme Guido (BRA)	58.85	Q
6	3	5	Albert Subirats (VEN)	58.86	Q
7	2	5	Gustavo Adolfo Taricco (ARG)	59.17	Q
8	1	5	Juan David Pérez (COL)	59.41	Q
9	2	3	Andres Montoya (COL)	59.46	
10	2	2	Carlos Enrique Carvajal (ECU)	1:00.17	
11	1	3	Nicolas Francia (URU)	1:00.23	
12	3	6	Alan Abarca Cortez (CHI)	1:02.71	
13	1	2	Marcelino Richaards (SUR)	1:02.80	
14	3	2	Ricardo Javier Ramirez (PAR)	1:03.21	
15	2	7	Victor Mauricio Garcia (PER)	1:04.76	
16	3	7	Ivan Marcelo Zavala (ECU)	1:04.98	
17	3	1	Armando Esteban Claure (BOL)	1:06.16	
	1	7	Jair Boerenveen (SUR)	DNS	
	2	6	Mauricio Fiol (PER)	DNS	

=== Final ===
Rank	Lane	Athlete	Result	Notes
1st place, gold medalist(s)	2	Guilherme Guido (BRA)	55.14	CR
2nd place, silver medalist(s)	4	Federico Grabich (ARG)	55.53	
3rd place, bronze medalist(s)	7	Albert Subirats (VEN)	55.57	
4	3	Gabriel Mangabeira (BRA)	57.97	
5	5	Luis Rojas Martinez (VEN)	58.31	
6	8	Juan David Pérez (COL)	58.77	
7	6	Charles Hockin (PAR)	59.07	
8	1	Gustavo Adolfo Taricco (ARG)	59.38	
