= Swimming at the 2010 South American Games – Men's 100 metre butterfly =

The Men's 100m butterfly event at the 2010 South American Games was held on March 28, with the heats at 10:45 and the Final at 18:10.

== Medalists ==
Gold	Silver	Bronze
Albert Subirats; Venezuela	Ben Hockin; Paraguay	Gustavo Daniel Paschetta; Argentina

== Records ==
Standing records prior to the 2010 South American Games
World record	Michael Phelps (USA)	49.82	Rome, Italy	1 August 2009
Competition Record	Julio Galofre (BRA)	55.41	Buenos Aires, Argentina	17 November 2006
South American record	Albert Subirats (VEN)	50.65	Rome, Italy	31 July 2009

== Results ==
=== Heats ===
Rank	Heat	Lane	Athlete	Result	Notes
1	3	4	Albert Subirats (VEN)	55.51	Q
2	1	4	Gustavo Paschetta (ARG)	55.57	Q
3	2	3	Ben Hockin (PAR)	55.78	Q
4	1	5	Juan López Nieto (COL)	55.92	Q
5	3	5	Marcos Barale (ARG)	56.26	Q
6	3	6	Mauricio Fiol (PER)	56.28	Q
7	1	3	Jesus Casanova (VEN)	56.71	Q
8	3	3	Andres Montoya (COL)	56.79	Q
9	2	5	Jose Barrantes (PER)	56.89	
10	1	2	Marcelino Richaards (SUR)	56.96	
11	2	4	Gabriel Mangabeira (BRA)	57.19	
12	3	2	Philippe Rodriguez (CHI)	57.80	
13	2	6	Favio Alessandro Segovia (PAR)	58.11	
14	1	6	Joel Romeu (URU)	58.19	
15	2	2	Diego Eugenio Macias (ECU)	58.41	
16	2	7	Ivan Marcelo Zavala (ECU)	1:00.21	
17	3	7	Alejandro Madde (BOL)	1:01.72	
18	1	7	Niall Roberts (GUY)	1:02.41	

=== Final ===
Rank	Lane	Athlete	Result	Notes
1st place, gold medalist(s)	4	Albert Subirats (VEN)	52.86	CR
2nd place, silver medalist(s)	3	Ben Hockin (PAR)	54.90	
3rd place, bronze medalist(s)	5	Gustavo Daniel Paschetta (ARG)	54.99	
4	6	Juan López Nieto (COL)	55.58	
5	2	Marcos Barale (ARG)	56.46	
6	8	Andres Montoya (COL)	56.91	
7	1	Jesus Casanova (VEN)	57.00	
8	7	Mauricio Fiol (PER)	57.79	
