= Swimming at the 2010 South American Games – Men's 50 metre backstroke =

The Men's 50m backstroke event at the 2010 South American Games was held on March 29, with the heats at 10:06 and the Final at 18:00.

== Medalists ==
Gold	Silver	Bronze
Guilherme Guido; Brazil	Federico Grabich; Argentina	Daniel Orzechowski; Brazil

== Records ==
Standing records prior to the 2010 South American Games
World record	Liam Tancock (GBR)	24.04	Rome, Italy	2 August 2009
Competition Record	German Otero (ARG)	26.25	Buenos Aires, Argentina	18 November 2006
South American record	Guilherme Guido (BRA)	24.49	Rome, Italy	1 August 2009

== Results ==
=== Heats ===
Rank	Heat	Lane	Athlete	Result	Notes
1	3	4	Guilherme Guido (BRA)	25.47	Q CR
2	2	4	Daniel Orzechowski (BRA)	26.05	Q
3	1	4	Federico Grabich (ARG)	26.37	Q
4	3	5	Albert Subirats (VEN)	26.71	Q
5	2	5	Juan David Pérez (COL)	26.77	Q
6	3	3	Oliver Banados (CHI)	27.20	Q
7	2	6	Ben Hockin (PAR)	27.19	Q
8	2	3	Gustavo Adolfo Taricco (ARG)	27.48	Q
9	1	5	Daniel Cuellar (COL)	27.69	
10	1	6	Luis Rojas Martinez (VEN)	27.74	
11	1	3	Raul Pereira de Souza (PAR)	27.94	
12	3	2	Carlos Carvajal (ECU)	27.99	
13	3	6	Nicolas Francia (URU)	28.41	
14	1	2	Mauricio Villanueva (PER)	28.65	
15	2	7	Marcelino Richaards (SUR)	29.04	
16	2	2	Alan Abarca Cortez (CHI)	29.09	
17	3	7	Ivan Zavala (ECU)	30.03	
18	1	7	Armando Zayas Claure (BOL)	30.88	

=== Final ===
Rank	Lane	Athlete	Result	Notes
1st place, gold medalist(s)	4	Guilherme Guido (BRA)	25.09	CR
2nd place, silver medalist(s)	3	Federico Grabich (ARG)	25.69	
3rd place, bronze medalist(s)	5	Daniel Orzechowski (BRA)	26.05	
4	2	Juan David Pérez (COL)	26.35	
4	6	Albert Subirats (VEN)	26.35	
6	1	Ben Hockin (PAR)	26.97	
7	7	Oliver Banados (CHI)	27.62	
8	8	Gustavo Adolfo Taricco (ARG)	28.07	
