= Swimming at the 2010 South American Games – Men's 50 metre butterfly =

The Men's 50m butterfly event at the 2010 South American Games was held on March 26, with the heats at 10:00 and the Final at 18:00.

== Medalists ==
Gold	Silver	Bronze
Albert Subirats; Venezuela	Glauber Silva; Brazil	Ben Hockin; Paraguay

== Records ==
Standing records prior to the 2010 South American Games
World record	Rafael Muñoz (ESP)	22.43	Málaga, Spain	5 April 2009
Competition Record	Jader Silva (BRA)	24.80	Buenos Aires, Argentina	15 November 2006
South American record	Nicholas Santos (BRA)	22.87	Palhoça, Brazil	4 September 2009

== Results ==
=== Heats ===
Rank	Athlete	Result	Notes
1	Albert Subirats (VEN)	24.03	Q CR
2	Glauber Silva (BRA)	24.18	Q
3	Ben Hockin (PAR)	24.46	Q
4	Gustavo Daniel Paschetta (ARG)	24.76	Q
5	Daniel Cuellar (COL)	25.11	Q
6	Jesus Casanova (VEN)	25.13	Q
7	Guilherme Roth (BRA)	25.15	Q
8	Marcelino Richaards (SUR)	25.27	Q
9	Marcos Barale (ARG)	25.36	
10	Rodrigo Caceres (URU)	25.40	
11	Diego Zambrano Macias (ECU)	25.48	
12	Juan Cambindo (COL)	25.51	
13	Manuel Alonso Ericsson (PER)	26.19	
14	Philippe Rodriguez (CHI)	26.30	
15	Perry Lindo (AHO)	26.33	
15	Favio Segovia (PAR)	26.33	
17	Niall Roberts (GUY)	26.60	
18	Hycinth Cijntje (AHO)	26.84	
19	Joel Romeu (URU)	26.93	
20	Alejandro Madde (BOL)	27.20	
21	Mauricio Fiol (PER)	27.21	
22	Martin Manattini (BOL)	27.45	
23	Fabian Binns (GUY)	27.89	

=== Final ===
Rank	Athlete	Result	Notes
1st place, gold medalist(s)	Albert Subirats (VEN)	23.66	CR
2nd place, silver medalist(s)	Glauber Silva (BRA)	24.22	
3rd place, bronze medalist(s)	Ben Hockin (PAR)	24.33	
4	Guilherme Roth (BRA)	24.72	
5	Gustavo Daniel Paschetta (ARG)	24.86	
6	Jesus Casanova (VEN)	25.32	
7	Daniel Cuellar (COL)	25.45	
8	Marcelino Richaards (SUR)	25.53	
