= Mauricio Garcia (disambiguation) =

Mauricio Garcia is a mass murderer who died at the scene of a mass shooting he perpetrated at a mall in Texas in May 2023

Mauricio Garcia may also refer to:

== Patrilineal surname: Garcia ==
- Mauricio García Araujo (1930–2012), Venezuelan economist
- Mauricio García Ezcurra (soldier), first commander of the Spanish Republican Army 138th Mixed Brigade
- Mauricio García Vega (born 1944), Mexican painter
- Mauricio García Villegas, Colombian columnist and writer who cofounded the non-profit legal organization Dejusticia
- Mauricio Garcia (18th century), South American artist, and member of the Cusco School
- Mauricio Garcia (sport shooter), airsoft rifle shooter for Chile at Shooting at the 2006 South American Games
- Mauricio García (skater), a rollerskater for the Dominican Republic at the 2015 Pan American Games
- Mauricio Garcia (flautist), U.S. musician and member of the Boston Musica Viva
- Mauricio Garcia (guitarist), Mexican musician and member of the Disco Ruido
- Mauricio García (American football), Mexican player of American football for the Galgos de Tijuana
- Carlos Mauricio García (alias "Doble Cero" ("Double Zero") or "Rodrigo"), a 1980s Colombian paramilitary leader for the United Self-Defense Forces of Colombia (AUC)
- Victor Mauricio Garcia, a swimmer for Peru at Swimming at the 2010 South American Games – Men's 100 metre backstroke

== Matrilineal surname: Garcia ==
- José Maurício Nunes Garcia (1767–1830), Brazilian composer
