= Swimming at the 2010 South American Games – Men's 4 × 100 metre medley relay =

The Men's 4 × 100 m freestyle relay event at the 2010 South American Games was held on March 29 at 18:35.

== Medalists ==
Gold	Silver	Bronze
Albert Subirats; Christian Quintero; Daniele Tirabasi; Crox Acuña; Venezuela	Nicolas Oliveira; Guilherme Roth; Rodrigo Castro; Thiago Pereira; Brazil	Juan David Pérez; Jorge Murillo; Juan López Nieto; Julio Galofre; Colombia

== Records ==
Standing records prior to the 2010 South American Games
World record	United States	3:08.24	Beijing, China	11 August 2008
Competition Record	Argentina	3:24.16	Buenos Aires, Argentina	18 November 2006
South American record	Brazil	3:10.80	Rome, Italy	26 July 2009

== Results ==
=== Final ===
Rank	Lane	Athlete	Result	Notes
1st place, gold medalist(s)	5	Venezuela	3:22.89	CR
1st place, gold medalist(s)	5	Albert Subirats	50.71	CR
1st place, gold medalist(s)	5	Christian Quintero	51.35	CR
1st place, gold medalist(s)	5	Daniele Tirabasi	51.18	CR
1st place, gold medalist(s)	5	Crox Acuña	49.65	CR
2nd place, silver medalist(s)	4	Brazil	3:24.56	
2nd place, silver medalist(s)	4	Nicolas Oliveira	50.99	
2nd place, silver medalist(s)	4	Guilherme Roth	51.62	
2nd place, silver medalist(s)	4	Rodrigo Castro	50.83	
2nd place, silver medalist(s)	4	Thiago Pereira	51.12	
3rd place, bronze medalist(s)	6	Colombia	3:26.16	
3rd place, bronze medalist(s)	6	Juan David Pérez	52.60	
3rd place, bronze medalist(s)	6	Jorge Murillo	51.84	
3rd place, bronze medalist(s)	6	Juan López Nieto	51.14	
3rd place, bronze medalist(s)	6	Julio Galofre	50.58	
4	7	Paraguay	3:29.62	
4	7	Jose Enmanuel Martinez	53.03	
4	7	Favio Segovia	54.24	
4	7	Charles Hockin	52.21	
4	7	Ben Hockin	50.14	
5	3	Argentina	3:29.71	
5	3	Martin Naidich	53.09	
5	3	Federico Grabich	50.28	
5	3	Juan Lisandro Monzon	53.10	
5	3	Gustavo Daniel Paschetta	53.24	
6	1	Peru	3:55.11	
6	1	Sabastian Silva	54.22	
6	1	Jose Manuel Barrantes	52.36	
6	1	Manuel Alonso Ericsson	53.39	
6	1	Sebastian Madico	52.95	
7	2	Uruguay	3:34.07	
7	2	Rodrigo Caceres	53.14	
7	2	Nicolas Francia	53.83	
7	2	Joel Romeu	51.96	
7	2	Martin Kutscher	55.14	
8	8	Ecuador	3:40.72	
8	8	Mario Navas Navarro	54.96	
8	8	Iván Enderica	54.82	
8	8	Carlos Carvajal	55.71	
8	8	Diego Macias	55.23	
