= Jessica Camposano =

Colombian swimmer

Sport
- Sport: Swimming
- Strokes: Butterfly, freestyle
Medal record
Women's swimming
Representing Colombia
Central American and Caribbean Games
Silver medal – second place	2014 Veracruz	200 m freestyle
Silver medal – second place	2014 Veracruz	100 m butterfly
Silver medal – second place	2014 Veracruz	4×100 m freestyle
Silver medal – second place	2014 Veracruz	4×100 m medley
Bronze medal – third place	2014 Veracruz	200 m butterfly
Bolivarian Games
Gold medal – first place	2013 Trujillo	100 m freestyle
Gold medal – first place	2013 Trujillo	4×100 m medley
Silver medal – second place	2013 Trujillo	200 m freestyle
Silver medal – second place	2013 Trujillo	100 m butterfly
Silver medal – second place	2013 Trujillo	4×100 m freestyle
Silver medal – second place	2013 Trujillo	4×200 m freestyle

Jessica Camposano is a Colombian swimmer that competed in the women's 200 metre freestyle event at the 2017 World Aquatics Championships, and has set multiple national records.
