= Swimming at the 1999 Pan American Games – Men's 100 metre butterfly =

Men's 100 metre butterfly at the 1999 Pan American Games
- Venue: Pan Am Pool
- Dates: August 3 (preliminaries and finals)
- Competitors: from - nations

Medalists
Gold medal	Francisco Sánchez	Venezuela
Silver medal	Shamek Pietucha	Canada
Bronze medal	José Meolans	Argentina

The men's 100 metre butterfly competition of the swimming events at the 1999 Pan American Games took place on 3 August at the Pan Am Pool. The last Pan American Games champion was Mark Henderson of US.

This race consisted of two lengths of the pool, all in butterfly.

== Results ==
All times are in minutes and seconds.

KEY:	q	Fastest non-qualifiers	Q	Qualified	GR	Games record	NR	National record	PB	Personal best	SB	Seasonal best

=== Heats ===
The first round was held on August 3.

Rank	Name	Nationality	Time	Notes
1	Francisco Sánchez	Venezuela	53.63	Q
2	-	-	-	Q
3	-	-	-	Q
4	-	-	-	Q
5	-	-	-	Q
6	-	-	-	Q
7	-	-	-	Q
8	-	-	-	Q
11	Jarod Schroeder	United States	55.89	
17	Sabir Muhammad	United States	57.20	

=== B Final ===
The B final was held on August 3.

Rank	Name	Nationality	Time	Notes
9	Oswaldo Quevedo	Venezuela	54.62	
10	Jarod Schroeder	United States	55.11	
11	Gabriel Mangabeira	Brazil	55.81	
12	Stephen Fahy	Bermuda	56.41	
13	Sabir Muhammad	United States	56.41	
14	Ruben Piñeda	El Salvador	56.68	
15	Roberto Delgado	Ecuador	56.89	
16	Nicholas Rees	Bahamas	57.07	

=== A Final ===
The A final was held on August 3.

Rank	Name	Nationality	Time	Notes
1st place, gold medalist(s)	Francisco Sánchez	Venezuela	53.33	GR
2nd place, silver medalist(s)	Shamek Pietucha	Canada	53.40	
3rd place, bronze medalist(s)	José Meolans	Argentina	54.03	
4	Jesus González	Mexico	54.68	
5	Yohan García	Cuba	54.85	
6	Andrew Livingston	Puerto Rico	54.97	
7	Collin Sood	Canada	55.12	
8	Pablo Abal	Argentina	55.27	
