= List of Barbadian records in swimming =

This is a list of national swimming records for Barbados. These are the fastest times ever swum by a swimmer representing the country.

These records are kept by Barbados's national swimming federation: the Barbados Amateur Swimming Association (BASA).

All records were set in finals unless noted otherwise.

== Long Course (50 m) ==
=== Men ===
| Event | Time | | Name | Club | Date | Meet | Location | Ref |
|---|---|---|---|---|---|---|---|---|
| 50 m freestyle | 22.68 | h | Jack Kirby | Irvine Novaquatics | 13 April 2024 | TYR Pro Swim Series | San Antonio, United States | |
| 100 m freestyle | 49.31 | h | Jack Kirby | Barbados | 22 June 2024 | Bahamian Championships | Nassau, Bahamas | |
| 200 m freestyle | 1:48.09 | h | Alex Sobers | Barbados | 25 July 2021 | Olympic Games | Tokyo, Japan | |
| 400 m freestyle | 3:53.19 | | Alex Sobers | Eagle Aquatics | 25 March 2021 | ISCA International Senior Cup | St. Petersburg, United States | |
| 800 m freestyle | 8:19.20 | | Damian Alleyne | - | March 2000 | USA Nationals | Federal Way, United States | |
| 1500 m freestyle | 16:08.33 | | Damian Alleyne | - | March 2000 | Regional IV | United States | |
| 50 m backstroke | 26.07 | | Jack Kirby | Barbados | 24 July 2018 | CAC Games | Barranquilla, Colombia | |
| 100 m backstroke | 55.42 | h | Jack Kirby | University of Southern California | 22 November 2019 | Art Adamson Invitational | College Station, United States | |
| 200 m backstroke | 2:00.85 | | Nicholas Neckles | Barbados | 17 July 2006 | Central American and Caribbean Games | Cartagena, Colombia | |
| 50 m breaststroke | 28.48 | | Andrei Cross | - | December 2007 | Dutch Open | Eindhoven, Netherlands | |
| 100 m breaststroke | 1:03.38 | sf | Bradley Ally | Barbados | March 2006 | Commonwealth Games | Melbourne, Australia | |
| 200 m breaststroke | 2:14.52 | | Bradley Ally | Pine Crest Swimming | 20 July 2008 | Southern Zone Sectional Championships | Fort Lauderdale, United States | |
| 50m butterfly | 25.65 | h | Shawn Clarke | Barbados | 22 July 2010 | Central American and Caribbean Games | Mayagüez, Puerto Rico | |
| 100m butterfly | 52.73 | | Bradley Ally | - | July 2009 | Southern Zone Sectional Championships | United States | |
| 200m butterfly | 2:03.68 | | Bradley Ally | - | 3 June 2007 | Mel Zajac Junior International | Vancouver, Canada | |
| 200m individual medley | 1:58.57 | h | Bradley Ally | Barbados | 13 August 2008 | Olympic Games | Beijing, China | |
| 400m individual medley | 4:14.01 | h | Bradley Ally | Barbados | 9 August 2008 | Olympic Games | Beijing, China | |
| 4×50m freestyle relay | 1:38.79 | | Damian Alleyne; Terrence Haynes; Martyn Forde; Cliff Gittens | Barbados | April 2001 | CARIFTA Swimming Championships | Nassau, Bahamas | |
| 4×100m freestyle relay | 3:27.15 | h | Shawn Clarke (50.40); Martyn Forde (51.85); Terrence Haynes (50.67); Vaughn Forsythe (54.23) | Barbados | 26 July 2009 | World Championships | Rome, Italy | |
| 4×200m freestyle relay | 7:55.24 | | Damian Alleyne; Terrence Haynes; Andrei Cross; Cliff Gittens | Barbados | July 2001 | Central American and Caribbean Championships | Santo Domingo, Dominican Republic | |
| 4×50m medley relay | 2:02.88 | | D Durant; D Clarke; Shawn Clarke; C Moseley | Barbados | April 1993 | CARIFTA Swimming Championships | Barbados | |
| 4×100m medley relay | 3:48.65 | | Nicholas Neckles; Andrei Cross; Bradley Ally; Terrence Haynes | Barbados | 22 July 2006 | Central American and Caribbean Games | Cartagena, Colombia | |

Legend: # – Record awaiting ratification by BASA; WR – World record; AM – Americas record;
Records not set in finals: h – heat; sf – semifinal; r – relay 1st leg; rh – relay heat 1st leg; b – B final; † – en route to final mark; so – swim-off; tt – time trial

=== Women ===
| Event | Time | | Name | Club | Date | Meet | Location | Ref |
|---|---|---|---|---|---|---|---|---|
| 50m freestyle | 25.49 | | Leah Martindale | Barbados | 26 July 1996 | Olympic Games | Atlanta, United States | |
| 100m freestyle | 56.03 | b | Leah Martindale | Barbados | 20 July 1996 | Olympic Games | Atlanta, United States | |
| 200m freestyle | 2:03.25 | | Heidi Stoute | Barbados | 1 August 2026 | CAC Games | Santo Domingo, Dominican Republic | |
| 400m freestyle | 4:23.31 | | Lani Cabrera | Davie Nadadores Swim Team | 12 May 2012 | GCST Trials Qualifier | Fort Myers, United States | |
| 800m freestyle | 9:00.09 | | Lani Cabrera | Davie Nadadores Swim Team | 18 March 2012 | Spring Southern Zone South Sectional | Orlando, United States | |
| 1500m freestyle | 17:14.37 | | Lani Cabrera | Davie Nadadores Swim Team | 12 July 2012 | Summer Southern Zone South Sectional | Ft. Lauderdale, United States | |
| 50m backstroke | 29.65 | | Danielle Titus | Tulane Aquatics | 29 April 2021 | UANA Tokyo Qualifier | Clermont, United States | |
| 100m backstroke | 1:03.15 | h | Danielle Titus | Tulane Aquatics | 15 May 2021 | Atlanta Classic | Atlanta, United States | |
| 200m backstroke | 2:19.18 | d | Danielle Titus | Tulane Aquatics | 16 May 2021 | Atlanta Classic | Atlanta, United States | |
| 50m breaststroke | 34.60 | | Adara Stoddard | HighTide | 26 May 2024 | Annual Aquatic Centre International | Christ Church, Barbados | |
| 100m breaststroke | 1:14.67 | h | Adara Stoddard | Barbados | 25 July 2026 | Commonwealth Games | Glasgow, United Kingdom | |
| 200m breaststroke | 2:42.59 | | Adara Stoddard | Barbados | 11 July 2022 | CCCAN Championships | Christ Church, Barbados | |
| 50m butterfly | 28.18 | | Leah Martindale | Barbados | July 2002 | Commonwealth Games | Manchester, United Kingdom | |
| 100m butterfly | 1:03.49 | | Leah Martindale | - | July 1997 | - | | |
| 200m butterfly | 2:22.33 | | Amara Gibbs | - | April 2011 | | | |
| 200m individual medley | 2:26.79 | | Zabrina Holder | Barbados | April 2011 | CARIFTA Championships | Wildey, Barbados | |
| 400m individual medley | 5:14.52 | | Lani Cabrera | Barbados | 24 April 2011 | CARIFTA Championships | Wildey, Barbados | |
| 4×50m freestyle relay | 1:53.67 | | Keilani Talma (28.30); Adara Stoddard; Toni Walrond; Amelia Mayers | Barbados | 19 April 2022 | CARIFTA Championships | Bridgetown, Barbados | |
| 4×100m freestyle relay | 4:04.02 | | Sariyah Sherry; Alexis Clarke; Inayah Sherry; Zabrina Holder | Barbados | July 2014 | CISC | Bridgetown, Barbados | |
| 4×200m freestyle relay | 8:54.15 | | Alexis Clarke; Sariyah Sherry; Zabrina Holder; Amara Gibbs | Barbados | July 2014 | CISC | Bridgetown, Barbados | |
| 4×50m medley relay | 2:08.74 | | Inayah Sherry; Deandre Small; Amara Gibbs; Zabrina Holder | Alpha Sharks | March 2011 | Barbadian Championships | Barbados | |
| 4×100m medley relay | 4:38.28 | | Amara Gibbs; Deandre Small; Zabrina Holder; Lee-Ann Rose | Alpha Sharks | March 2011 | Barbadian Championships | Barbados | |

Legend: # – Record awaiting ratification by BASA; WR – World record; AM – Americas record;
Records not set in finals: h – heat; sf – semifinal; r – relay 1st leg; rh – relay heat 1st leg; b – B final; † – en route to final mark; so – swim-off; tt – time trial

=== Mixed relay ===
| Event | Time | | Name | Club | Date | Meet | Location | Ref |
|---|---|---|---|---|---|---|---|---|
| 4×50 m freestyle relay | 1:44.67 | | Deandre Small (27.95); Christian Selby (23.83); Russell Oliver (25.05); Lani Cabrera (27.84) | Barbados | 29 June 2016 | CISC | Nassau, Bahamas | |
| 4×100 m freestyle relay | 3:48.16 | h | Victor Ashby (55.93); Jaiya Simmons (58.99); Heidi Stoute (58.89); Joshua Ross (54.35) | Barbados | 11 August 2025 | Junior Pan American Games | Asunción, Paraguay | |
| 4×50 m medley relay | | | | | | | | |
| 4×100 m medley relay | 4:08.59 | h | Danielle Titus (1:05.06); Luis Sebastian Weekes (1:04.84); Adara Stoddard (1:07.82); Jack Kirby (50.87) | Barbados | 2 August 2022 | Commonwealth Games | Birmingham, Great Britain | |

Legend: # – Record awaiting ratification by BASA; WR – World record; AM – Americas record;
Records not set in finals: h – heat; so – swim-off

== Short Course (25 m) ==
=== Men ===
| Event | Time | | Name | Club | Date | Meet | Location | Ref |
|---|---|---|---|---|---|---|---|---|
| 50m freestyle | 22.35 | | Martyn Forde | University of Toronto | 20 February 2010 | CIS Championships | Toronto, Canada | |
| 100m freestyle | 48.83 | h | Alex Sobers | Barbados | 20 December 2021 | World Championships | Abu Dhabi, United Arab Emirates | |
| 200m freestyle | 1:46.91 | h | Alex Sobers | Barbados | 17 December 2021 | World Championships | Abu Dhabi, United Arab Emirates | |
| 400m freestyle | 3:52.79 | | Damian Alleyne | - | December 2001 | Barbadian Championships | Barbados | |
| 800m freestyle | 8:25.81 | | Alex Sobers | Alpha Sharks | December 2015 | Barbadian Championships | Bridgetown, Barbados | |
| 1500m freestyle | 16:09.22 | | Christian Selby | Barbados | 16 December 2012 | World Championships | Istanbul, Turkey | |
| 50m backstroke | 24.71 | h | Jack Kirby | Barbados | 18 December 2021 | World Championships | Abu Dhabi, United Arab Emirates | |
| 100m backstroke | 52.82 | h | Jack Kirby | Barbados | 16 December 2021 | World Championships | Abu Dhabi, United Arab Emirates | |
| 200m backstroke | 1:58.02 | | Nicholas Neckles | - | December 2009 | Barbadian Championships | Barbados | |
| 50m breaststroke | 27.87 | | Luis Weekes | Bath University | 15 December 2023 | Swim England National Winter Championships | Sheffield, United Kingdom | |
| 100m breaststroke | 1:00.93 | h | Bradley Ally | Barbados | 15 December 2010 | World Championships | Dubai, United Arab Emirates | |
| 200m breaststroke | 2:09.35 | | Bradley Ally | - | 4 December 2010 | French Championships | Chartres, France | |
| 50m butterfly | 25.04 | | Shawn Clarke | - | December 2009 | Barbadian Championships | Barbados | |
| 100m butterfly | 53.55 | | Bradley Ally | - | 23 October 2010 | Meeting National d'Automne | Compiègne, France | |
| 200m butterfly | 2:04.21 | | Damian Alleyne | - | December 2001 | Barbadian Championships | Barbados | |
| 100m individual medley | 53.12 | sf | Bradley Ally | Barbados | 18 December 2010 | World Championships | Dubai, United Arab Emirates | |
| 200 m individual medley | 1:56.11 | h | Bradley Ally | Barbados | 17 December 2010 | World Championships | Dubai, United Arab Emirates | |
| 400m individual medley | 4:13.84 | | Bradley Ally | Barbados | 30 January 2004 | World Cup | East Meadow, United States | |
| 4×50m freestyle relay | 1:37.99 | | Damon St.Prix; Kent Mullins; Akeem Nurse; Alex Sobers | Alpha Sharks | December 2015 | Barbadian Championships | Bridgetown, Barbados | |
| 4×100m freestyle relay | 3:53.32 | | T Trotman; Kevin Cadogan; M Alexander; A Burton | Barbados | August 2007 | Goodwill Swim Meet | Trinidad and Tobago | |
| 4×200 m freestyle relay | 9:31.09 | | | Stingrays | April 1992 | - | | |
| 4×50m medley relay | 1:54.91 | | Nicholas Neckles; S Robertson; D Durant; E McConney | Heatwave | April 1994 | - | | |
| 4×100m medley relay | 4:29.96 | | M McConney; C Moseley; Nicholas Neckles; Shawn Clarke | Barbados | April 1992 | CARIFTA Swimming Championships | | |

Legend: # – Record awaiting ratification by BASA; WR – World record; AM – Americas record;
Records not set in finals: h – heat; sf – semifinal; r – relay 1st leg; rh – relay heat 1st leg; b – B final; † – en route to final mark; so – swim-off; tt – time trial

=== Women ===
| Event | Time | | Name | Club | Date | Meet | Location | Ref |
|---|---|---|---|---|---|---|---|---|
| 50m freestyle | 24.97 | | Leah Martindale | - | December 1995 | Barbadian Championships | Barbados | |
| 100m freestyle | 54.75 | | Leah Martindale | - | December 1995 | Barbadian Championships | Barbados | |
| 200m freestyle | 2:04.10 | h | Lani Cabrera | Barbados | 7 December 2014 | World Championships | Doha, Qatar | |
| 400m freestyle | 4:20.78 | h | Lani Cabrera | Barbados | 14 December 2012 | World Championships | Istanbul, Turkey | |
| 800m freestyle | 8:56.23 | | Hannah Gill | - | November 2017 | | | |
| 1500m freestyle | 17:45.79 | | Hannah Gill | - | December 2013 | - | | |
| 50m backstroke | 29.22 | | Danielle Titus | Alpha | 5 December 2019 | Barbadian Championships | Bridgetown, Barbados | |
| 100m backstroke | 1:01.52 | | Danielle Titus | Alpha | 7 December 2019 | Barbadian Championships | Bridgetown, Barbados | |
| 200m backstroke | 2:12.86 | h | Danielle Titus | Barbados | 15 December 2024 | World Championships | Budapest, Hungary | |
| 50m breaststroke | 34.69 | | Lanielle Weekes | - | November 1998 | - | | |
| 100m breaststroke | 1:14.32 | | Adara Stoddard | Hightide Stingrays | 6 December 2020 | Barbadian Championships | Wildey, Barbados | |
| 200m breaststroke | 2:40.52 | | Adara Stoddard | Hightide Stingrays | 5 December 2020 | Barbadian Championships | Wildey, Barbados | |
| 50m butterfly | 27.04 | | Leah Martindale | - | January 1998 | - | | |
| 100m butterfly | 1:02.51 | | Zabrina Holder | Barbados | 11 September 2011 | Commonwealth Youth Games | Douglas, Isle of Man | |
| 200m butterfly | 2:20.34 | | Zabrina Holder | - | December 2010 | Barbadian Championships | Barbados | |
| 100m individual medley | 1:06.25 | | Danielle Titus | - | November 2017 | | | |
| 200m individual medley | 2:22.64 | | Zabrina Holder | - | December 2011 | Barbadian Championships | Barbados | |
| 400m individual medley | 5:04.14 | | Zabrina Holder | - | December 2010 | Barbadian Championships | Barbados | |
| 4×50m freestyle relay | 1:54.52 | | Ashley Weekes; Shannan Smith; Shirkeitha Hunte; Destiny Harding | Barbados | 19 August 2018 | Goodwill Swim Meet | Bridgetown, Barbados | |
| 4×100m freestyle relay | 4:09.58 | | Keilani Talma; Kathryn Ford; Amelie Baker; Adia Deane | Pirates | 5 December 2019 | Barbadian Championships | Bridgetown, Barbados | |
| 4×200m freestyle relay | 9:02.50 | | Adia Deane; Keilani Talma; Amelie Baker; Kathryn Ford | Pirates | 8 December 2019 | Barbadian Championships | Bridgetown, Barbados | |
| 4×50m medley relay | 2:12.30 | | Amelie Baker; Keilani Talma; Adia Deane; Kathryn Ford | Pirates | 4 December 2019 | Barbadian Championships | Bridgetown, Barbados | |
| 4×100m medley relay | 4:49.70 | | Keilani Talma; Kathryn Ford; Amelie Baker; Adia Deane | Pirates | 3 December 2019 | Barbadian Championships | Bridgetown, Barbados | |

Legend: # – Record awaiting ratification by BASA; WR – World record; AM – Americas record;
Records not set in finals: h – heat; sf – semifinal; r – relay 1st leg; rh – relay heat 1st leg; b – B final; † – en route to final mark; so – swim-off; tt – time trial
