= Steffen Deibler =

German swimmer (born 1987)

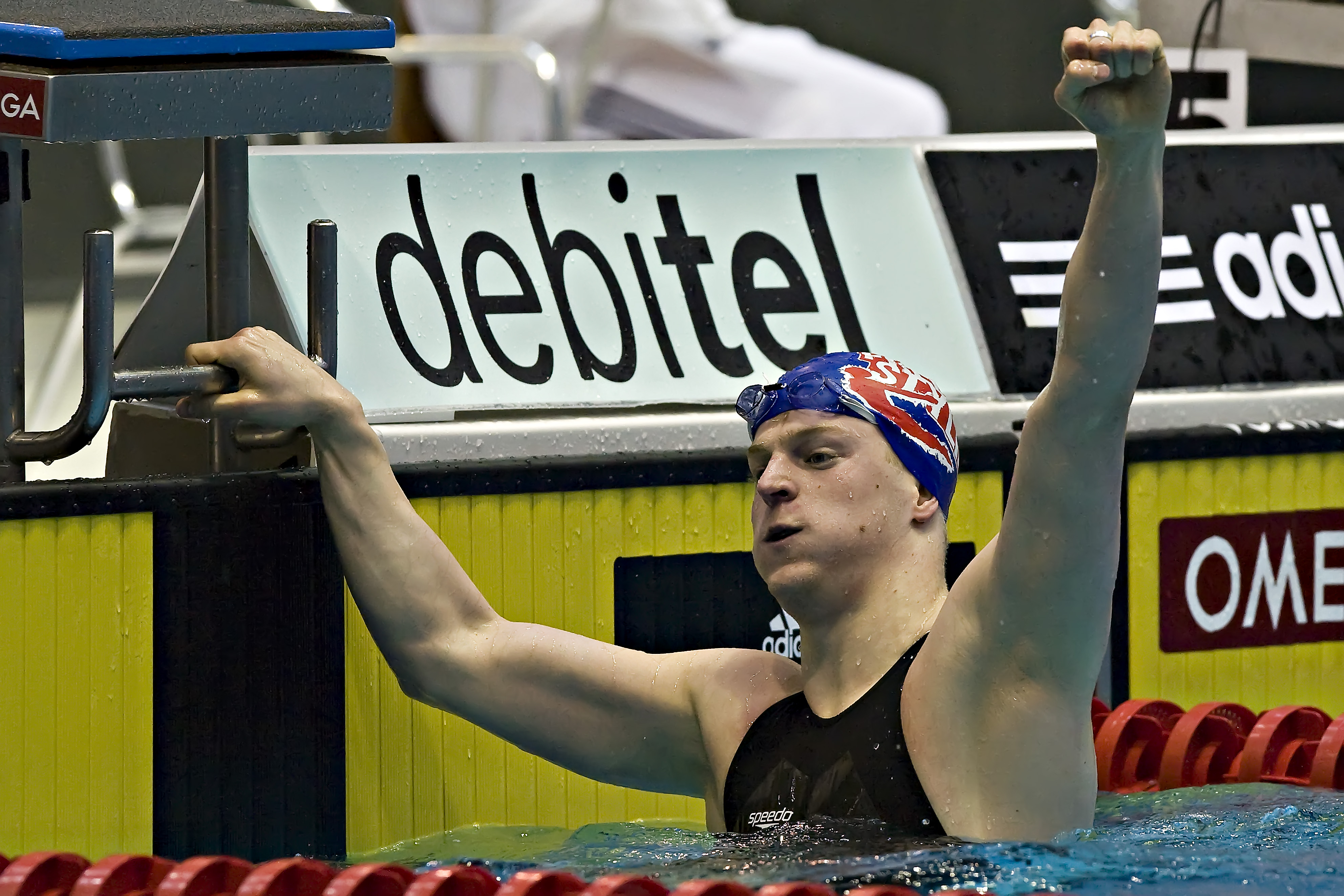
- Deibler in 2008

Personal information
- Nationality: Germany
- Born: 10 July 1987 (age 38) Biberach an der Riß, West Germany
- Height: 1.86 m (6 ft 1 in)
- Weight: 81 kg (179 lb)

Sport
- Sport: Swimming
- Strokes: Butterfly, freestyle
- Club: Hamburger Schwimm-Club
Medal record
World Championships (SC)
Bronze medal – third place	2010 Dubai	50 m butterfly
European Championships (LC)
Silver medal – second place	2012 Debrecen	4×100 m medley
European Championships (SC)
Gold medal – first place	2005 Trieste	4×50 m medley
Gold medal – first place	2007 Debrecen	4×50 m medley
Gold medal – first place	2010 Eindhoven	50 m freestyle
Gold medal – first place	2010 Eindhoven	50 m butterfly
Gold medal – first place	2010 Eindhoven	100 m butterfly
Gold medal – first place	2010 Eindhoven	4×50 m medley
Silver medal – second place	2005 Trieste	100 m freestyle
Silver medal – second place	2010 Eindhoven	4×50 m freestyle
Silver medal – second place	2013 Herning	4×50 m mixed medley
Silver medal – second place	2013 Herning	50 m butterfly
Bronze medal – third place	2007 Debrecen	4×50 m freestyle
Bronze medal – third place	2011 Szczecin	4×50 m medley
Bronze medal – third place	2013 Herning	100 m butterfly
Bronze medal – third place	2013 Herning	4×50 m medley

Steffen Deibler (born 10 July 1987) is a German former competitive swimmer from Biberach an der Riß. From 2009 to 2018 he was the world record holder for the 50 m butterfly (short course).

== Swimming career ==
Deibler specialized in short distances in the butterfly and freestyle. He graduated in 2007 at Pestalozzi-Gymnasium Biberach and started to study environment engineering in October 2008. As a teenager, Deibler trained at the TG Biberach under coach Gerold Seifert. The study was the reason to change is training base to Hamburg. At the 2008 German swimming championships, he won 50 m and 100 m freestyle and qualified for the 2008 Summer Olympics. He was second behind Paul Biedermann in the 200 m freestyle. In November 2009, Deibler set a new 50 meter butterfly short course world record in Aachen, with a time of 22.06, beating the previous record of Amaury Leveaux by 0.12 seconds. At the FINA World Cup 2009 in Berlin, he became the first person to swim 50 m butterfly within 22 seconds in a 25 m pool, when he improved his world record to 21.80 seconds.

At the 2008 Summer Olympics, Deibler finished in 38th, 33rd and 15th place in the 50 m, 100 m, and 4 × 100 m freestyle events. He improved at the 2012 Olympics, finishing fourth in the 100 m butterfly and sixth in the 4 × 100 m medley relay. At the 2016 Summer Olympics in Rio de Janeiro, he competed in the 100 m butterfly where he finished 18th in the heats and did not qualify for the semifinals. He also competed as a member of the 4 x 100 m medley relay team that finished in 7th place.

== International career ==
European Junior Swimming Championships 2004 in Lisbon:

- 2nd place in the 4 × 100 m freestyle relay

European Junior Swimming Championships 2005 in Budapest:

- 1st in the 50 m freestyle (0:22.26 min)
- 1st in the 100 m freestyle (0:49.26 min)
- 1st in the 4 × 100 m freestyle
- 1st in the 4 × 100 m medley swimming

European Short Course Swimming Championships 2005 in Trieste:

- 1st in the 4×50 m medley swimming
- 2nd in the 100 m freestyle 0:47.43 min)
- 4th in the 50 m freestyle (0:21.56 min)

European Short Course Swimming Championships 2007 in Debrecen:

- 1st in the 4×50 m medley swimming
- 3rd in the 4×50m freestyle

German swimming championships 2008 in Berlin

- 1st in the 100 m freestyle (0:48.55 min – German record – qualification for the 2008 Summer Olympics)

Aachener Schwimmfest 2009 in Aachen:

- 50 m butterfly (00:22.06 min) world record

World cup Berlin 2009:

- 1st in the 50 m butterfly (00:21.80 min) world record
- 2nd in the 100 m butterfly (00:49.23 min)
- 3rd in the 50 m freestyle (00:20.73 min)

== Personal bests ==
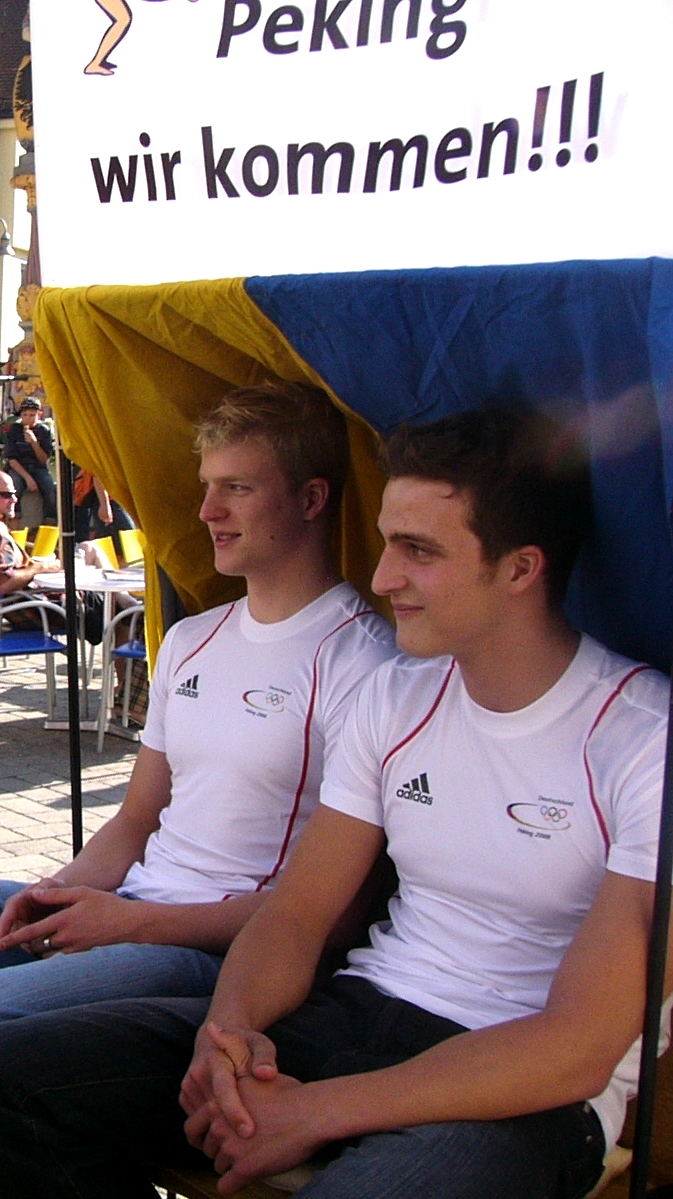
Steffen (left) and Markus Deibler in 2008

Stroke	Distance	Time LC	Time SC
Freestyle	50 m	21.99	20.73
Freestyle	100 m	48.43	45.91
Freestyle	200 m	1:47.71	1:42.74
Butterfly	50 m	23.02	21.80 Former WR
Butterfly	100 m	51.19	49.23

Key: WR = World record

== Personal life ==
His younger brother Markus also competed in swimming at the 2008 and 2012 Olympics.

Records
Preceded by (France) Amaury Leveaux	Men's 50 metre butterfly world record holder (short course); 14 November 2009 – 6 October 2018	Succeeded by (Brazil) Nicholas Santos
