= Luis Rojas Martinez =

Venezuelan swimmer (born 1990)

Luis Rojas
Personal information
- Full name: Luis Rafael Rojas Martinez
- Born: 14 September 1990 (age 35) Caracas, Venezuela
- Height: 1.82 m (6 ft 0 in)
- Weight: 192 lb (87 kg)

Sport
- Sport: Swimming
- Strokes: Backstroke, freestyle
- College team: Florida Southern Moccasins
Medal record
Bronze medal – third place	2011 Guadalajara	4x100 Freestyle relay

Luis Rafael Rojas Martinez (born 14 September 1990) is a Venezuelan swimmer and National Record holder from Venezuela. He swam for Venezuela at the 2011 Pan American Games. He currently swims collegiately in the United States at Florida Southern College. He comes into his senior year having earned 21 All-American awards in his career (12 individual and nine relay), with seven each season.

He also swam at the:

- 2009 Bolivarian Games
- 2010 South American Games
- 2010 Central American Games
