= Gabriel Mangabeira =

Brazilian swimmer (born 1982)

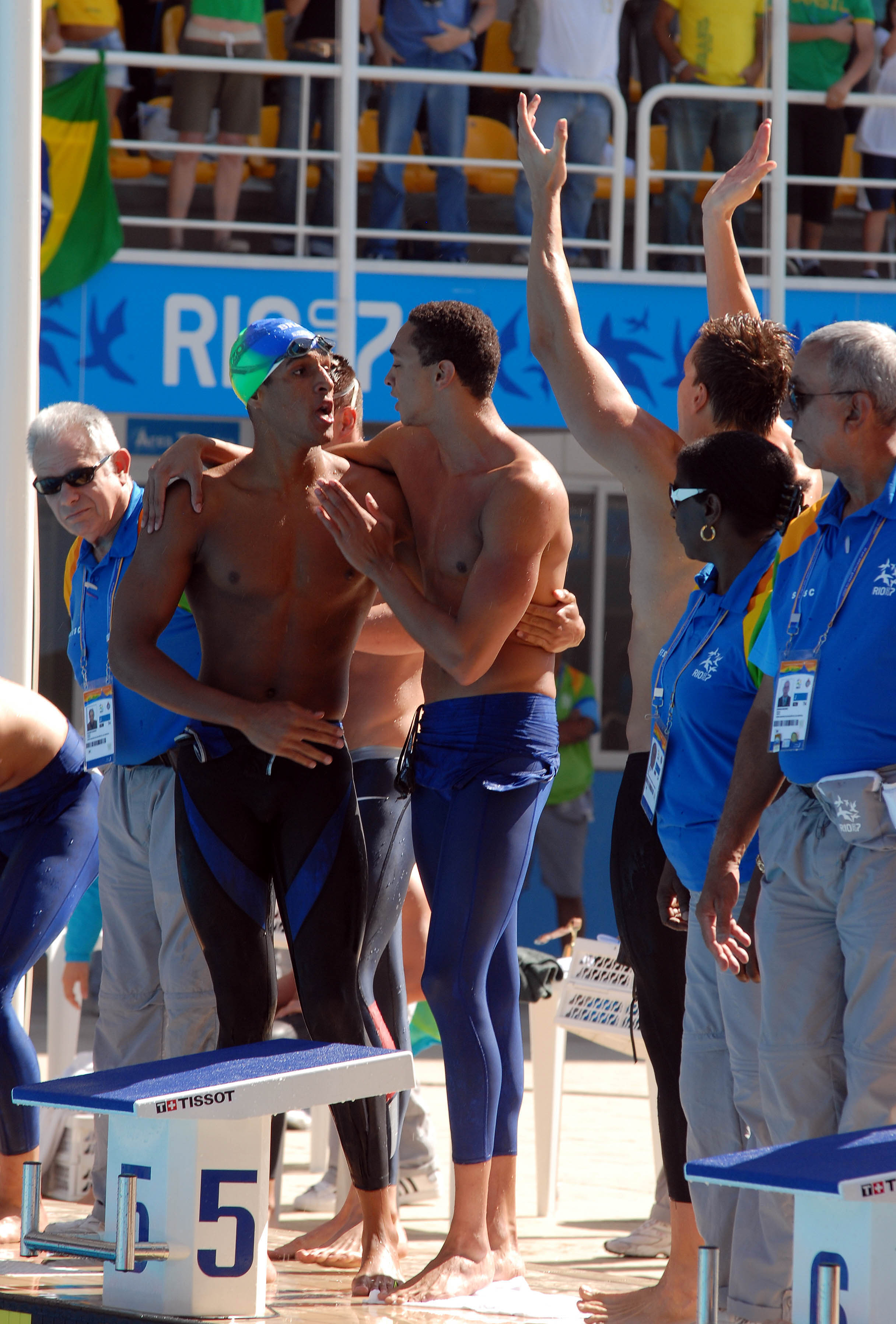
- Mangabeira and Fernando Silva in 4x100m medley at 2007 Pan Am Games

Personal information
- Full name: Gabriel Semain Vasconcellos Mangabeira
- Nickname: "Manga"
- National team: Brazil
- Born: 31 January 1982 (age 44) Rio de Janeiro, Brazil
- Height: 1.93 m (6 ft 4 in)
- Weight: 88 kg (194 lb)

Sport
- Sport: Swimming
- Strokes: Butterfly
- Club: AEAA/PMC, Rio de Janeiro
- College team: University of Florida
Medal record
Men's swimming
Representing Brazil
Pan American Games
Gold medal – first place	2011 Guadalajara	4×100 m freestyle
Gold medal – first place	2011 Guadalajara	4×100 m medley
Silver medal – second place	2007 Rio	100 m butterfly
Silver medal – second place	2007 Rio	4×100 m medley
South American Games
Gold medal – first place	2010 Medellín	4×100 m medley

Gabriel Samain Vasconcellos Mangabeira (born 31 January 1982) is a Brazilian competition swimmer who qualified for the men's 100-metre butterfly at both the 2004 Summer Olympics and the 2008 Summer Olympics. Mangabeira also won a silver medal in the 100-metre butterfly at the 2007 Pan American Games.

== Early years ==
Mangabeira was born in Rio de Janeiro in 1982.

== College career ==
Mangabeira attended the University of Florida in Gainesville, Florida, where he swam for coach Gregg Troy's Florida Gators swimming and diving team in the National Collegiate Athletic Association (NCAA) competition from 2001 to 2004. As a Gator swimmer, he received eighteen All-American honors. Mangabeira graduated from the University of Florida with a bachelor's degree in food and resource economics in 2004.

== International career ==
He started swimming at the instigation of his grandfather, who was a swimming teacher, at the age of two years. He tried judo at 10 years old, but left due to his mother. His first club was the Canto do Rio in Niterói. At age 13, he moved to Fluminense. Three years later, he moved to Vasco, where he stayed until 2000.

He participated at the 1999 Pan American Games in Winnipeg, where he finished 11th in the 100-metre butterfly, and 11th in the 200-metre individual medley. He was at the 2003 World Aquatics Championships in Barcelona, where he finished 37th in the 100-metre butterfly.

Prior to the 2004 Olympics, he came to the United States, where he was trained by the Olympic champion Anthony Nesty. At the 2004 Summer Olympics, Mangabeira made it to the finals of the 100-metre butterfly where he finished in sixth place, beating the South American record, and swimming alongside well-known swimmers like Ian Crocker and Michael Phelps.

Mangabeira was a semifinalist at the 2005 World Aquatics Championships in Montreal, in the 100-metre butterfly, where he finished in 13th place, and in the 50-metre backstroke, where he came in at 16th place. He was at the 2006 FINA World Swimming Championships (25 m) in Shanghai, where he finished 19th in the 100-metre butterfly, 20th in the 50-metre backstroke and 9th in the 4×100-metre medley. He swam at the 2006 Pan Pacific Swimming Championships, where he finished 5th in the 100-metre butterfly and 7th in the 4×100-metre medley.

Mangabeira also qualified to compete in the 2007 World Aquatics Championships in the 100-metre butterfly and 50-metre backstroke, but did not make it past the initial heats. He ranked 17th in the 100-metre butterfly and 9th in the 4×100-metre medley, helping the Brazilian relay to qualify for the 2008 Olympics.

At the 2007 Pan American Games in Rio de Janeiro, he won the silver medal in the 100-metre butterfly, and also helped the Brazilian 4×100-metre medley relay in heats, winning the silver medal in the event. Mangabeira returned to the Olympics in 2008 to compete in the 100-metre butterfly, but did not advance beyond the first heats. He finished 23rd.

In 2009, Mangabeira competed in the 2009 World Aquatics Championships in the 100-metre butterfly and 4×100-metre medley relay, and reached the finals in both events, finishing eighth in the individual race and fourth in the relay, which he swam with Guilherme Guido (backstroke), Henrique Barbosa (breaststroke) and César Cielo Filho (freestyle). He swam the butterfly leg for the Brazilian medley relay team, in a race where the first 4 relays beat the U.S. world record from Beijing 2008.

At the 2010 South American Games in Medellín, Mangabeira won a gold medal in the 4×100-metre medley. He was at the 2010 Pan Pacific Swimming Championships in Irvine, where he finished 4th in the 4×100-metre medley, 15th in the 100-metre butterfly, and 15th in the 100-metre backstroke.

At the 2011 Pan American Games in Guadalajara, Mangabeira won gold in the 4×100-metre medley and in the 4×100-metre freestyle.

== Post-career ==
After retiring from competitive swimming in 2013, Mangabeira joined the Brazilian Olympic Committee’s Athlete Support Program, participating in educational and youth development initiatives connected to the Jogos Escolares da Juventude.

In 2014, he was hired by The Coca-Cola Company in Brazil to contribute to the company’s strategic planning for the Rio 2016 Olympic Games, leveraging his experience as an Olympic athlete in sports-related projects.

Since leaving professional sport, Mangabeira has worked in marketing and technology, serving as a campaign manager at the digital agency Russell Marketing and collaborating on projects with brands such as Coca-Cola, Canon and Panasonic, as well as emerging technology startups.

== See also ==
- List of University of Florida alumni
- List of University of Florida Olympians
