= Ismael Ortiz =

Panamanian swimmer

Personal information
- Full name: Ismael Jafet Ortiz Zuñiga
- Nickname: Da Ish
- Nationality: Panama
- Born: October 22, 1982 (age 43) Panama City, Panama
- Height: 6 ft 1 in (1.85 m)
- Weight: 73 kg (161 lb)

Sport
- Sport: Swimming
- Strokes: Freestyle
- Club: Pine Crest Swim Club (USA)
- College team: Drury University (2005-'07)

Ismael Jafet Ortiz Zuñiga (born October 22, 1982, in Panama City) is a swimmer from Panama. He participated in the 2004 Summer Olympics in Athens, competing in the Men's 100-meter Freestyle. His heat time was 51.74 seconds, which was not enough to advance to the semi-finals. Ortiz also represented his native country at the World Championships (long course) in 2001 and 2003.

"...I found out I wasn’t going when I read the newspaper! How do you think one feels when your own country doesn’t even tell you that you’re not going?"

— Ismael Ortiz, on the 2008 Olympic controversy

Despite qualifying to represent Panama in the 2008 Olympics with a time below 23.00 seconds, domestic political circumstances prevented him from competing in the games, causing a small public outcry in his home country.

He swam for the USA's Drury University from 2005 to 2007. He graduated with a degree in Fine Art in 2008, and currently teaches youth swimming in Miami.

== Trivia ==
- Ortiz is known affectionately by teammates and fans as "The Ish."
- He is also a successful sculpture artist in his own right, having had many shows in both the United States and in Panama. His found-object artwork is reminiscent of the sculptures of Robert Rauschenberg and Jean Tinguely.
- Ortiz is a noted fan of the manga series Naruto, admittedly spending hours on end watching pirated YouTube transcriptions of the comics. Playful attempts at coining the nickname "Pablo Naruto" (cf. Chilean love poet Pablo Neruda), a pun derived from his characteristic romantic Latin machismo and his aforementioned otaku tendencies, never stuck.

Ortiz is also an avid sailor according to the Denver post.
