= Yevgeny Korotyshkin =

Russian swimmer

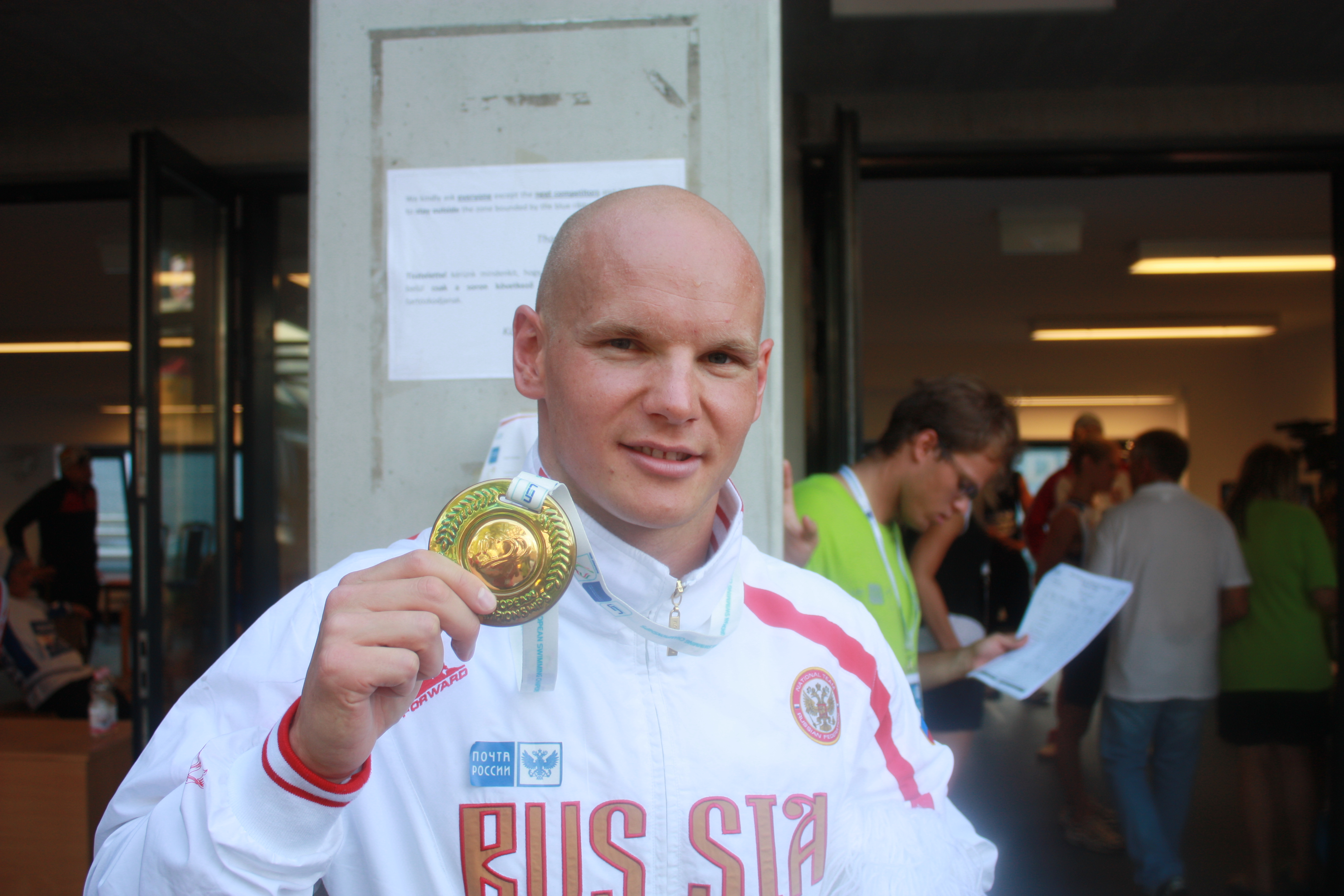
- Yevgeny Korotyshkin in 2010

Personal information
- Full name: Yevgeny Korotyshkin
- Nationality: Russia
- Born: 30 April 1983 (age 43) Moscow, Soviet Union
- Height: 1.86 m (6 ft 1 in)
- Weight: 85 kg (187 lb)

Sport
- Sport: Swimming
- Strokes: Butterfly
Medal record
Olympic Games
Silver medal – second place	2012 London	100m butterfly
World Championships (LC)
Silver medal – second place	2003 Barcelona	4×100 m medley
Silver medal – second place	2005 Montreal	4×100 m medley
Bronze medal – third place	2003 Barcelona	50 m butterfly
World Championships (SC)
Gold medal – first place	2008 Manchester	4×100 m medley
Gold medal – first place	2010 Dubai	100 m butterfly
Gold medal – first place	2014 Doha	4×50 m freestyle
Silver medal – second place	2010 Dubai	4×100 m medley
Bronze medal – third place	2004 Indianapolis	4×100 m medley
Bronze medal – third place	2008 Manchester	50 m butterfly
European Championships (LC)
Gold medal – first place	2006 Budapest	4×100 m medley
Gold medal – first place	2008 Eindhoven	100 m butterfly
Gold medal – first place	2008 Eindhoven	4×100 m medley
Gold medal – first place	2010 Budapest	100 m butterfly
Silver medal – second place	2010 Budapest	4×100 m medley
Bronze medal – third place	2010 Budapest	50 m butterfly
European Championships (SC)
Gold medal – first place	2009 Istanbul	100 m butterfly
Gold medal – first place	2009 Istanbul	4×50 m medley
Gold medal – first place	2012 Chartres	100 m butterfly
Gold medal – first place	2013 Herning	100 m butterfly
Silver medal – second place	2005 Trieste	100 m butterfly
Silver medal – second place	2007 Debrecen	50 m butterfly
Silver medal – second place	2007 Debrecen	100 m butterfly
Silver medal – second place	2007 Debrecen	4×50 m medley
Silver medal – second place	2008 Rijeka	4×50 m medley
Silver medal – second place	2011 Szczecin	100 m butterfly
Silver medal – second place	2011 Szczecin	4×50 m medley
Silver medal – second place	2012 Chartres	4×50 m freestyle
Silver medal – second place	2012 Chartres	4×50 m medley
Bronze medal – third place	2009 Istanbul	50 m butterfly
Summer Universiade
Gold medal – first place	2007 Bangkok	4×100 m medley
Silver medal – second place	2003 Daegu	100 m butterfly
Silver medal – second place	2003 Daegu	4×100 m medley
Silver medal – second place	2005 Izmir	50 m butterfly
Bronze medal – third place	2003 Daegu	50 m butterfly
Bronze medal – third place	2007 Bangkok	50 m butterfly

Yevgeny Yevgeniyevich Korotyshkin, occasionally spelled "Evgeny", (Russian: Евгений Евгеньевич Коротышкин) (born 30 April 1983) is a Russian swimmer from Moscow. He specialises in the butterfly stroke, winning the silver medal in the 100 m butterfly at the 2012 Summer Olympics.
