= Terrence Haynes =

Barbadian swimmer (born 1984)

Personal information
- Full name: Terrence Elton Haynes
- Nationality: Barbados
- Born: October 5, 1984 (age 41) Toronto, Ontario, Canada
- Height: 6 ft 0 in (1.83 m)
- Weight: 78 kg (172 lb)

Sport
- Sport: Swimming
- Strokes: Freestyle
- Club: Toronto Swim Club
- College team: University of Toronto Varsity Blues

Terrence Elton Haynes (born October 5, 1984) is a two-time Olympic swimmer from Barbados. He represented Barbados at the 2004 and 2008 Olympics. He currently resides in Toronto, as a member of the Varsity Blues swim team at the University of Toronto.

He holds the Barbadian record in the 50m and 100m freestyle events.
