= Martyn Forde =

Barbadian swimmer

Personal information
- Full name: Martyn Forde
- Nationality: Barbados

Sport
- Sport: Swimming
- Strokes: Freestyle
- Club: Toronto Swim Club (Canada)
- College team: University of Toronto (Canada)

Martyn Forde is an Olympic-swimmer from Barbados. He swam for Barbados at the 2008 Olympics and the 2007 World Championships.

He holds the Barbadian Records in the short-course 50 and 100 freestyles.
