= Rodrigo Díaz (swimmer) =

Guatemalan swimmer (born 1984)

Personal information
- Full name: Rodrigo Eduardo Díaz Alarcón
- Nationality: Guatemala
- Born: 12 March 1984 (age 42)
- Height: 1.82 m (5 ft 11 1/2 in)
- Weight: 54 kg (119 lb)

Sport
- Sport: Swimming
- Strokes: Freestyle

Rodrigo Eduardo Díaz Alarcón (born March 12, 1984) is a retired Guatemalan swimmer, who specialized in sprint freestyle events. Diaz qualified for the men's 50 m freestyle at the 2004 Summer Olympics in Athens, by achieving a FINA B-standard of 23.60 from the Central American and Mexican Championships in Panama City, Panama. He challenged seven other swimmers in heat four, including two-time Olympian Gregory Arkhurst of Côte d'Ivoire. He raced to third place by 0.11 of a second behind winner José Mafio of Uruguay, outside his entry time of 23.69. Diaz failed to advance into the semifinals, as he placed fifty-third out of 86 swimmers in the preliminaries.
