= Jacinto Ayala =

Dominican swimmer (born 1987)

Personal information
- Born: Jacinto de Jesus Ayala Benjamin; January 13, 1987 (age 39)

Sport
- Sport: Swimming

Jacinto de Jesus Ayala Benjamin (born January 13, 1987) is a Dominican swimmer. He competed at the 2008 Summer Olympics.
