= Mauricio Fiol =

Peruvian swimmer (born 1994)

Personal information
- Full name: Mauricio Fiol Villanueva
- Nationality: Peru
- Born: March 26, 1994 (age 32) Lima, Peru
- Height: 1.78 m (5 ft 10 in)
- Weight: 72 kg (159 lb)

Sport
- Sport: Swimming
- Strokes: Butterfly, Freestyle
Medal record
Men's swimming
Pan American Games
Disqualified	2015 Toronto	200 m butterfly
South American Games
Silver medal – second place	2014 Santiago	100 m butterfly
Silver medal – second place	2014 Santiago	200 m butterfly
Bronze medal – third place	2014 Santiago	200 m freestyle
FINA Swimming World Cup
Bronze medal – third place	2012 Moscow	1500 m freestyle

Mauricio Fiol Villanueva (born March 26, 1994) is a former Peruvian swimmer. At the 2012 Summer Olympics, he competed in the Men's 200 metre butterfly, finishing in 25th place overall in the heats, failing to qualify for the semifinals. He has also won a bronze medal in 1500 metre free in the 2012 Swimming World Cup in Moscow, Russia.

Although Fiol was initially awarded the silver medal at the 2015 Pan American Games in the 200 meter butterfly event, he tested positive for stanozolol after the race. Fiol was stripped of his silver medal and disqualified from participating in the 2016 Olympics by the FINA and was banned for four years to run to 11 July 2019.

Immediately after returning to competition in 2019, Fiol tested positive for stanozolol on six separate tests. He was subsequently served with an 8-year competition ban to run to 2027.
