= Octavio Alesi =

Venezuelan swimmer (born 1986)

Personal information
- Born: December 10, 1986 (age 39) Barinas, Venezuela

Sport
- Sport: Swimming
Medal record
Representing Venezuela
Pan American Games
Silver medal – second place	2003 Santo Domingo	4x100m freestyle relay
Bronze medal – third place	2007 Rio de Janeiro	4x100m freestyle relay
Bronze medal – third place	2011 Guadalajara	4x100m freestyle relay
Central American and Caribbean Games
Gold medal – first place	2006 Cartagena	4x100m freesryle relay
Gold medal – first place	2006 Cartagena	4x100m medley relay
Gold medal – first place	2010 Mayagüez	50m butterfly
Gold medal – first place	2010 Mayagüez	4x100m freestyle relay
Gold medal – first place	2010 Mayagüez	4x100m medley relay
Silver medal – second place	2006 Cartagena	50m butterfly
Silver medal – second place	2010 Mayagüez	100m butterfly

Octavio Andrés Alesi Gonzaléz (born 10 December 1986) is an Olympic swimmer from Venezuela.

== Participation ==
He swam for Venezuela at the:

- Olympics: 2008, 2012
- World Championships: 2003, 2007, 2009
- Pan American Games: 2003, 2007, 2011
- Central American & Caribbean Games: 2006
