= Albert Subirats =

Venezuelan swimmer (born 1986)

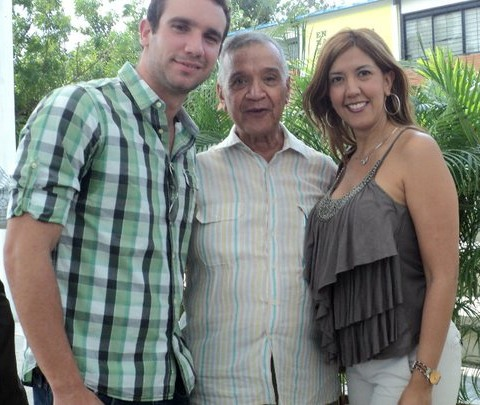
- Albert Subirats (left) in 2013

Personal information
- Full name: Albert Subirats Altes
- Nickname: "El Torpedo"
- National team: Venezuela
- Born: 25 September 1986 (age 40) Valencia, Carabobo, Venezuela
- Height: 1.90 m (6 ft 3 in)
- Weight: 85 kg (187 lb)

Sport
- Sport: Swimming
- Strokes: Butterfly, freestyle
- College team: University of Arizona (2004–'07)
Medal record
Men's swimming
Representing Venezuela
World Championships (LC)
| Bronze medal – third place | 2007 Melbourne | 100 m butterfly |
World Championships (SC)
| Gold medal – first place | 2010 Dubai | 50 m butterfly |
| Silver medal – second place | 2006 Shanghai | 100 m butterfly |
| Silver medal – second place | 2010 Dubai | 100 m butterfly |
Pan American Games
| Gold medal – first place | 2011 Guadalajara | 100 m butterfly |
| Bronze medal – third place | 2007 Rio | 100 m butterfly |
| Bronze medal – third place | 2007 Rio | 4×100 m free |
| Bronze medal – third place | 2011 Guadalajara | 4×100 m free |
Central American and Caribbean Games
| Gold medal – first place | 2006 Cartagena | 100 m freestyle |
| Gold medal – first place | 2006 Cartagena | 50 m butterfly |
| Gold medal – first place | 2006 Cartagena | 100 m butterfly |
| Gold medal – first place | 2006 Cartagena | 4×100 m free |
| Gold medal – first place | 2006 Cartagena | 4×100 m medley |
| Gold medal – first place | 2010 Mayagüez | 100m freestyle |
| Gold medal – first place | 2010 Mayagüez | 100m backstroke |
| Gold medal – first place | 2010 Mayagüez | 100m butterfly |
| Gold medal – first place | 2010 Mayagüez | 4×100 m free |
| Gold medal – first place | 2010 Mayagüez | 4×100 m medley |
| Gold medal – first place | 2014 Veracruz | 50 m backstroke |
| Gold medal – first place | 2014 Veracruz | 50 m butterfly |
| Gold medal – first place | 2014 Veracruz | 100 m butterfly |
| Gold medal – first place | 2014 Veracruz | 4x100 m free |
| Gold medal – first place | 2014 Veracruz | 4x100 m medley |
| Silver medal – second place | 2006 Cartagena | 50 m freestyle |
| Silver medal – second place | 2006 Cartagena | 4x200 m free |
| Silver medal – second place | 2010 Mayagüez | 50m freestyle |
| Silver medal – second place | 2010 Mayagüez | 50m butterfly |
| Silver medal – second place | 2014 Veracruz | 100 m backstroke |
| Bronze medal – third place | 2010 Mayagüez | 50m backstroke |
| Bronze medal – third place | 2014 Veracruz | 100 m freestyle |
South American Games
| Gold medal – first place | 2002 Belém | 100 m freestyle |
| Gold medal – first place | 2002 Belém | 400 m freestyle |
| Gold medal – first place | 2010 Medellin | 50 m butterfly |
| Gold medal – first place | 2010 Medellin | 100 m butterfly |
| Gold medal – first place | 2010 Medellin | 4×100 m free |
| Gold medal – first place | 2010 Medellin | 4×200 m free |
| Gold medal – first place | 2014 Santiago | 100 m backstroke |
| Gold medal – first place | 2014 Santiago | 100 m butterfly |
| Silver medal – second place | 2002 Belém | 4×100 m free |
| Silver medal – second place | 2002 Belém | 4×100 m medley |
| Bronze medal – third place | 2002 Belém | 50 m freestyle |
| Bronze medal – third place | 2002 Belém | 200 m freestyle |
| Bronze medal – third place | 2014 Santiago | 100 m freestyle |
| Bronze medal – third place | 2014 Santiago | 4×100 m free |
| Bronze medal – third place | 2014 Santiago | 4×100 m medley |

Albert Subirats Altes (Note: In this Spanish name, the first or paternal surname is Subirats and the second or maternal family name is Altes.) (born 25 September 1986) is an Olympic and national record holding swimmer from Venezuela.

== Career ==
He represented his homeland at the 2004, 2008 and 2012 Olympics. At the 2007 World Championships, Subirats won Venezuela's first (long course) World Championships medal.

Collegiately, he attended the University of Arizona in the United States, where he swam for the Arizona Wildcats swimming and diving team from 2004 to 2007. While at Arizona, he was a 3-time individual NCAA champion, winning the 100 yd fly his junior and senior years (2006, 2007) and the 100 back (2006).

As of June 2009, he holds the Venezuelan records in the 50 m and 100 m freestyle, 50 m and 100 m backstroke and 50 & 100 m butterfly (long course) and was part of the 4 × 100 m freestyle and 4 × 100 m medley teams that hold those record. In the short course, he holds the 50 m backstroke and 50 m and 100 m butterfly records. He also holds the South American long course 100 m butterfly record, and the short course 50 m backstroke record.

At the 2006 Central American and Caribbean Games, he set a Games Record in winning the men's 100 m freestyle (49.55); bettering the record of 50.00 set by fellow Venezuelan Francisco Sánchez on 11 August 1998, at the 1998 Games in Maracaibo.

== See also ==
- List of South American records in swimming
