= Elvis Burrows =

Bahamian swimmer (born 1989)

Personal information
- Full name: Elvis Vereance Burrows
- National team: Bahamas
- Born: 24 February 1989 (age 37) Freeport, Bahamas
- Height: 1.83 m (6 ft 0 in)
- Weight: 82 kg (181 lb)

Sport
- Sport: Swimming
- Strokes: Freestyle, butterfly
- College team: University of Kentucky (U.S.)
- Coach: Gary Conelly
Medal record
Men's swimming
Representing Bahamas
Central American and Caribbean Games
Bronze medal – third place	2010 Mayagüez	50 m butterfly

Elvis Vereance Burrows (born 24 February 1989) is a Bahamian swimmer who specializes in sprint freestyle and butterfly events. He is a four-time national record holder in his respective swimming events, and is a member of Kentucky Wildcats swimming team, upon his admission at the University of Kentucky.

== Biography ==
Elvis Vereance Burrows born in Freeport, Bahamas on 24 February 1989.

== Career ==
Burrows started out his swimming career, when he and his family moved to the United States to pursue his father's education with a doctorate of philosophy in theology. He won a state championship title for the sprint freestyle in 2005, and later emerged as the most valuable swimmer of the year at Seneca High School MCA in Louisville, Kentucky. With his outstanding achievements, he was eventually recruited by Gary Conelly, a coach and a relay swimmer who competed at the 1972 Summer Olympics in Munich, Germany, to play for the Kentucky Wildcats swimming team. As a member of the team, Burrows earned two All-American honors for the freestyle and medley relays at the NCAA championships.

Burrows made into the international scene, when he represented his homeland Bahamas at the 2008 Summer Olympics in Beijing. He competed for the men's 50 m freestyle, and swam against contenders, including Switzerland's Flori Lang and Lithuania's Rolandas Gimbutis, in the eighth heat of the competition. Burrows completed his event, with a time of 23.19 seconds, finishing seventh in the heats, but placing fifty-second in the overall standings. Despite his disappointing result at the Olympics, Burrows eventually emerged as one of Bahamas' most prominent swimmers in the late 2000s. At the 2009 FINA World Championships in Rome, Italy, he had set four national records in the men's sprint freestyle and butterfly events, which were all previously held by former Olympic swimmer Allan Murray. He also competed at the 2010 Central American and Caribbean Games in Mayagüez, Puerto Rico, and won a bronze medal in the men's 50 m butterfly event, with an impressive time of 24.30 seconds.

In 2010, Burrows graduated with a bachelor's degree of hospitality management and tourism with majors in nutrition and food science. He is currently working as a music producer and a songwriter. Burrows also tried out for the 2012 Olympics but he missed the qualification standard.
