= Brad Hamilton =

Jamaican swimmer (born 1989)

Personal information
- Nationality: Jamaica
- Born: November 20, 1989 (age 36)
- Height: 6 ft 2 in (1.88 m)

Sport
- Sport: Swimming
- Strokes: Freestyle, Butterfly, Breaststroke
- College team: University of North Carolina at Chapel Hill

Brad Hamilton (born 1989) is a Jamaican swimmer.

He holds Jamaican records in the 50 and 100 M Breaststroke, the 50, 100, and 200 M Butterfly, and the 400 and 800 M Freestyle Relays.
