= Julio Galofre =

Colombian swimmer (born 1987)

Personal information
- Full name: Julio César Galofre Montes
- Nationality: Colombia
- Born: July 27, 1987 (age 38) Barranquilla, Colombia
- Height: 1.83 m (6 ft 0 in)
- Weight: 68 kg (150 lb)

Sport
- Sport: Swimming
- Strokes: Freestyle
Medal record
Men's swimming
South American Games
Gold medal – first place	2006 B.Aires	100 m butterfly
Silver medal – second place	2006 B.Aires	200 m butterfly
Silver medal – second place	2014 Santiago	4x200 m freestyle
Bronze medal – third place	2010 Medellín	400 m freestyle
Bronze medal – third place	2010 Medellín	4x100 m freestyle
Bronze medal – third place	2010 Medellín	4x200 m freestyle
Bronze medal – third place	2010 Medellín	4x100 m medley

Julio César Galofre Montes (born 27 July 1987) is a Colombian swimmer who competed in the 2008 Summer Olympics.
