= Swimming at the 2014 South American Games – Women's 4 × 100 metre freestyle relay =

Women's 4 x 100 metre freestyle relay at the 2014 South American Games
- Venue: Estadio Nacional
- Dates: March 9, 2014 (heats & finals)
- Winning time: 3:44.19

Medalists
gold medal	Daynara de Paula, Larissa Oliveira, Alessandra Marchioro and Graciele Herrmann	Brazil
silver medal	Wendy Crespo, Erika Torrellas, Arlene Semeco and Andreina Pinto	Venezuela
bronze medal	Andrea Berrino, Aixa Triay, Cecilia Biagioli and Maria Belen Diaz	Argentina

The women's 4 x 100 metre freestyle relay competition at the 2014 South American Games took place on March 9 at the Estadio Nacional. The last champion was Brazil.

This race consisted of eight lengths of the pool. Each of the four swimmers completed two lengths of the pool. The first swimmer had to touch the wall before the second could leave the starting block.

== Records ==
Prior to this competition, the existing world and Pan Pacific records were as follows:

World record	Netherlands (NED); Inge Dekker (53.61); Ranomi Kromowidjojo (52.30); Femke Heemskerk (53.03); Marleen Veldhuis (52.78)	3:31.72	Rome, Italy	July 26, 2009
South American Games record	Brazil (BRA); Daynara de Paula (57.10); Flávia Delaroli (56.58); Alessandra Marchioro (56.36); Tatiana Barbosa (57.30)	3:48.34	Medellín, Colombia	March 28, 2010

== Results ==
All times are in minutes and seconds.

KEY:	q	Fastest non-qualifiers	Q	Qualified	CR	Championships record	NR	National record	PB	Personal best	SB	Seasonal best

=== Heats ===
Heats weren't performed, as only eight teams had entered.

=== Final ===
The final was held on March 9, at 19:54.

Rank	Lane	Name	Nationality	Time	Notes
1st place, gold medalist(s)	4	Daynara de Paula (56.15); Larissa Oliveira (55.61); Alessandra Marchioro (56.01); Graciele Herrmann (56.42)	Brazil	3:44.19	CR
2nd place, silver medalist(s)	5	Wendy Rodriguez Crespo (57.65); Erika Torrellas (57.24); Arlene Semeco (56.67); Andreina Pinto (57.22)	Venezuela	3:48.78	
3rd place, bronze medalist(s)	3	Andrea Berrino (57.46); Aixa Triay (56.84); Cecilia Biagioli (58.52); Maria Belen Diaz (57.21)	Argentina	3:50.03	NR
4	7	Carolina Colorado Henao (56.80); María Álvarez (58.46); Jessica Camposano (57.66); María Muñoz (58.18)	Colombia	3:51.10	
5	8	Sharon Bravo Rivas (58.46); Nicole Marmol Gilbert (58.93); Adriana Parra Chiriboga (1:01.43); Loren Bahamonde Cabello (1:00.03)	Ecuador	3:58.85	
6	2	Karen Riveros (59.78); Laura Orihuela Gianotti (1:01.69); Sofia López Chaparro (1:00.19); Maria Arrua Villagra (1:00.50)	Paraguay	4:02.16	NR
7	6	Catalina Aguilar Bosshardt (1:02.98); Katarina Blanco Rosbotham (1:00.51); Courtney Schultz Donlan (58.88); Isabel Riquelme Díaz (1:01.01)	Chile	4:03.38	
8	1	Jessica Cattaneo Paulista (1:00.72); Andrea Cedrón (1:00.27); Domenica Vallejo Jauslin (1:01.18); Daniela Miyahara Coello (1:01.82)	Peru	4:03.99	
