= Swimming at the 2014 South American Games – Women's 50 metre freestyle =

Women's 50 metre freestyle at the 2014 South American Games
- Venue: Estadio Nacional
- Dates: March 10, 2014 (heats & finals)
- Competitors: 17 from 10 nations
- Winning time: 25.26

Medalists
gold medal	Graciele Herrmann	Brazil
silver medal	Alessandra Marchioro	Brazil
bronze medal	Chinyere Pigot	Suriname

The women's 50 metre freestyle competition at the 2014 South American Games took place on March 10 at the Estadio Nacional. The last champion was Flávia Delaroli of Brazil.

This race consisted of one length of the pool in freestyle.

== Records ==
Prior to this competition, the existing world and Pan Pacific records were as follows:

World record	Britta Steffen (GER)	23.73	Rome, Italy	August 2, 2009
South American Games record	Flávia Delaroli (BRA)	25.37	Medellín, Colombia	March 29, 2010

== Results ==
All times are in minutes and seconds.

KEY:	q	Fastest non-qualifiers	Q	Qualified	CR	Championships record	NR	National record	PB	Personal best	SB	Seasonal best

=== Heats ===
The first round was held on March 10, at 11:30.

Rank	Heat	Lane	Name	Nationality	Time	Notes
1	3	4	Graciele Herrmann	Brazil	25.40	Q
2	2	4	Alessandra Marchioro	Brazil	25.77	Q
3	3	5	Chinyere Pigot	Suriname	26.05	Q
4	1	4	Arlene Semeco	Venezuela	26.10	Q
5	1	3	Aixa Triay	Argentina	26.43	Q
6	2	5	Carolina Colorado Henao	Colombia	26.58	Q
7	1	5	Loren Bahamonde Cabello	Ecuador	26.59	Q
8	3	3	Wendy Rodriguez Crespo	Venezuela	26.61	Q
9	2	3	Maria Belen Diaz	Argentina	27.02	
10	2	7	Karen Torrez Guzman	Bolivia	27.03	
11	3	6	Sharon Bravo Rivas	Ecuador	27.49	
12	3	7	Maria Rivera Pinto	Bolivia	27.59	
12	2	6	Courtney Schultz Dolan	Chile	27.59	
14	3	2	Karen Riveros	Paraguay	28.00	
15	1	2	Sofia Usher Grua	Uruguay	28.05	
16	1	6	Lucia Ramos Sanchez	Uruguay	28.08	
17	2	2	Katarina Blanco Rosbotham	Chile	28.25	

=== Final ===
The final was held on March 10, at 19:30.

Rank	Lane	Name	Nationality	Time	Notes
1st place, gold medalist(s)	4	Graciele Herrmann	Brazil	25.26	CR
2nd place, silver medalist(s)	5	Alessandra Marchioro	Brazil	25.43	
3rd place, bronze medalist(s)	3	Chinyere Pigot	Suriname	26.05	
4	6	Arlene Semeco	Venezuela	26.19	
5	7	Loren Bahamonde Cabello	Ecuador	26.32	
6	2	Aixa Triay	Argentina	26.54	
7	1	Wendy Rodriguez Crespo	Venezuela	26.78	
8	8	Maria Belen Diaz	Argentina	27.08	
