= Swimming at the 2011 Pan American Games – Women's 4 × 100 metre freestyle relay =

Women's 4 × 100 metre freestyle relay at the 2011 Pan American Games
- Venue: Scotiabank Aquatics Center
- Dates: October 15 (preliminaries and finals)
- Winning score: 3:40.66

Medalists
Gold medal	Madison Kennedy, Elizabeth Pelton, Amanda Kendall, Erika Erndl	United States
Silver medal	Michelle Lenhardt, Tatiana Barbosa, Flavia Delaroli-Cazziolato, Daynara de Paula	Brazil
Bronze medal	Jennifer Beckberger, Caroline Lapierre, Ashley McGregor, Paige Schultz	Canada

The women's 4 × 100 metre freestyle relay competition of the swimming events at the 2011 Pan American Games took place on the 15 of October at the Scotiabank Aquatics Center. The defending Pan American Games champion is the United States (Samantha Woodward, Julia Smit, Emily Kukors and Maritza Correia).

This race consisted of eight lengths of the pool. Each of the four swimmers completed two lengths of the pool. The first swimmer had to touch the wall before the second could leave the starting block.

== Records ==
Prior to this competition, the existing world and Pan American Games records were as follows:

World record	Netherlands (NED); Inge Dekker (53.61); Ranomi Kromowidjojo (52.30); Femke Heemskerk (53.03); Marleen Veldhuis (52.78)	3:31.72	Rome, Italy	July 26, 2009
Pan American Games record	United States (USA); Amanda Weir (54.46); Christina Swindle (55.75); Colleen Lanne (55.99); Courtney Shealy (55.73)	3:41.93	Santo Domingo, Dominican Republic	August 13, 2003

== Results ==
All times shown are in minutes.

KEY:	q	Fastest non-qualifiers	Q	Qualified	GR	Games record	NR	National record	PB	Personal best	SB	Seasonal best	PR	Pan American Games record

=== Heats ===
The first round was held on October 15.

Rank	Heat	Lane	Name	Nationality	Time	Notes
1	2	4	Madison Kennedy (55.63); Elizabeth Pelton (55.47); Amanda Kendall (54.49); Erika Erndl (55.26)	United States	3:40.85	Q, GR
2	2	6	Graciele Herrmann (56.55); Michelle Lenhardt (58.32); Flavia Delaroli-Cazziolato (56.33); Tatiana Barbosa (56.92)	Brazil	3:48.12	Q
3	2	2	Caroline Lapierre (57.29); Gabrielle Soucisse (59.40); Ashley McGregor (58.06); Jennifer Beckberger (56.44)	Canada	3:51.19	Q
4	2	5	Maria Fernanda Gonzalez (57.18); Martha Beltran (58.54); Gabriela Verdugo (1:00.73); Liliana Ibáñez (56.98)	Mexico	3:53.43	Q
5	1	4	Jeserik Pinto (58.34); Mercedes Toledo (59.40); Ximena Vilar (58.06); Wendy Rodriguez (58.54)	Venezuela	3:54.34	Q
6	1	6	Ariel Weech (59.00); Alicia Lightbourne (59.82); McKayla Lightbourne (1:00.59); Alana Dillette (58.72)	Bahamas	3:58.13	Q
7	1	5	Virginia Bardach (59.80); Florencia Perotti (1:01.09); Nadia Colovini (57.19); Cecilia Biagioli (1:00.53)	Argentina	3:58.61	Q
8	2	3	Andrea Cedron (1:00.99); Oriele Espinoza (1:02.35); Daniela Miyahara (1:02.14); Mariangela Macchiavello (59.40)	Peru	4:04.88	Q
	1	3		Uruguay	DNS	

=== Final ===
The final was held on October 15.

Rank	Lane	Name	Nationality	Time	Notes
1st place, gold medalist(s)	4	Madison Kennedy (55.55); Elizabeth Pelton (55.25); Amanda Kendall (54.62); Erika Erndl (55.24)	United States	3:40.66	GR
2nd place, silver medalist(s)	5	Michelle Lenhardt (57.06); Tatiana Barbosa (55.52); Flavia Delaroli-Cazziolato (55.83); Daynara de Paula (56.21)	Brazil	3:44.62	
3rd place, bronze medalist(s)	3	Jennifer Beckberger (56.27); Caroline Lapierre (56.86); Ashley McGregor (58.16); Paige Schultz (57.08)	Canada	3:48.37	
4	2	Jeserik Pinto (57.62); Wendy Rodriguez (57.92); Erika Torellas (58.00); Arlene Semeco (55.01)	Venezuela	3:48.55	NR
5	6	Maria Fernanda Gonzalez (57.12); Martha Beltran (58.18); Arantxa Medina (58.97); Liliana Ibáñez (55.60)	Mexico	3:49.87	NR
6	1	Nadia Colovini (56.55); Cecilia Bertoncello (58.62); Virginia Bardach (58.76); Cecilia Biagioli (57.97)	Argentina	3:51.90	NR
7	7	Ariel Weech (57.98); Alicia Lightbourne (58.72); McKayla Lightbourne (59.66); Alana Dillette (57.92)	Bahamas	3:54.28	
8	8	Andrea Cedron (59.93); Maria Alejandra Torres (1:01.56); Daniela Miyahara (1:00.34); Mariangela Macchiavello (58.81)	Peru	4:00.64	NR
