= Swimming at the 2014 South American Games – Women's 100 metre butterfly =

Women's 100 metre butterfly at the 2014 South American Games
- Venue: Estadio Nacional
- Dates: March 7, 2014 (heats & finals)
- Competitors: 15 from 9 nations
- Winning time: 59.35

Medalists
gold medal	Daynara de Paula	Brazil
silver medal	Carolina Colorado Henao	Colombia
bronze medal	Etiene Medeiros	Brazil

The women's 100 metre butterfly competition at the 2014 South American Games took place on March 7 at the Estadio Nacional. The last champion was Daynara de Paula of Brazil.

This race consisted of two lengths of the pool, all in butterfly.

== Records ==
Prior to this competition, the existing world and Pan Pacific records were as follows:

World record	Dana Vollmer (USA)	55.98	London, Great Britain	July 29, 2012
South American Games record	Daynara de Paula (BRA)	1:00.44	Medellín, Colombia	March 26, 2010

== Results ==
All times are in minutes and seconds.

KEY:	q	Fastest non-qualifiers	Q	Qualified	CR	Championships record	NR	National record	PB	Personal best	SB	Seasonal best

=== Heats ===
The first round was held on March 7, at 11:40.

Rank	Heat	Lane	Name	Nationality	Time	Notes
1	2	4	Daynara de Paula	Brazil	1:00.45	Q
2	1	5	Carolina Colorado Henao	Colombia	1:00.87	Q
3	2	5	Etiene Medeiros	Brazil	1:01.42	Q
4	1	4	Jessica Camposano	Colombia	1:01.91	Q
5	2	6	Maria Belen Diaz	Argentina	1:02.06	Q
6	1	3	Isabella Paez	Venezuela	1:02.78	Q
7	2	3	Jeserik Pinto Sequera	Venezuela	1:02.82	Q
8	2	8	Karen Torrez	Bolivia	1:03.34	Q
9	1	6	Sharon Bravo Rivas	Ecuador	1:03.37	
10	2	2	Martina Navaro Kusch	Chile	1:04.94	
11	2	7	Paloma Riveras Ortiz	Paraguay	1:06.28	
12	2	1	Katarina Blanco Rosbotham	Chile	1:06.51	
13	1	1	Adriana Parra Chiriboga	Ecuador	1:07.63	
14	1	7	Lizzy Nolasco Vazquez	Peru	1:08.28	
15	1	2	Karen Riveros	Paraguay	1:08.30	

=== Final ===
The final was held on March 7, at 19:43.

Rank	Lane	Name	Nationality	Time	Notes
1st place, gold medalist(s)	4	Daynara de Paula	Brazil	59.35	CR
2nd place, silver medalist(s)	5	Carolina Colorado Henao	Colombia	1:00.14	
3rd place, bronze medalist(s)	3	Etiene Medeiros	Brazil	1:00.88	
4	2	Maria Belen Diaz	Argentina	1:01.00	
5	6	Jessica Camposano	Colombia	1:01.19	
6	1	Jeserik Pinto Sequera	Venezuela	1:01.87	
7	7	Isabella Paez	Venezuela	1:02.20	
8	8	Karen Torrez	Bolivia	1:03.11	
