= Swimming at the 2014 South American Games – Women's 100 metre freestyle =

Women's 100 metre freestyle at the 2014 South American Games
- Venue: Estadio Nacional
- Dates: March 8, 2014 (heats & finals)
- Competitors: 21 from 11 nations
- Winning time: 55.70

Medalists
gold medal	Larissa Oliveira	Brazil
silver medal	Graciele Herrmann	Brazil
bronze medal	Chinyere Pigot	Suriname
bronze medal	Arlene Semeco	Venezuela

The women's 100 metre freestyle competition at the 2014 South American Games took place on March 8 at the Estadio Nacional. The last champion was Arlene Semeco of Venezuela.

This race consisted of two lengths of the pool, both lengths being in freestyle.

== Records ==
Prior to this competition, the existing world and Pan Pacific records were as follows:

World record	Britta Steffen (GER)	52.07	Rome, Italy	July 31, 2009
South American Games record	Arlene Semeco (VEN)	56.21	Medellín, Colombia	March 27, 2010

== Results ==
All times are in minutes and seconds.

KEY:	q	Fastest non-qualifiers	Q	Qualified	CR	Championships record	NR	National record	PB	Personal best	SB	Seasonal best

=== Heats ===
The first round was held on March 8, at 11:16.

Rank	Heat	Lane	Name	Nationality	Time	Notes
1	3	4	Graciele Herrmann	Brazil	56.56	Q
2	2	4	Larissa Oliveira	Brazil	56.96	Q
3	1	5	Chinyere Pigot	Suriname	57.39	Q
4	1	4	Arlene Semeco	Venezuela	57.54	Q
5	3	2	Aixa Triay	Argentina	57.55	Q
6	3	5	Jessica Camposano	Colombia	57.64	Q
7	2	5	Erika Torrellas	Venezuela	58.06	Q
8	3	3	Loren Bahamonde Cabello	Ecuador	58.15	Q
9	2	1	Karen Torrez Guzman	Bolivia	58.47	
10	3	6	Maria Belen Diaz	Argentina	58.73	
11	1	3	María Muñoz	Colombia	59.12	
12	2	6	Andrea Cedrón	Peru	59.90	
13	3	7	Isabel Riquelme Díaz	Chile	59.98	
14	1	2	Courtney Schultz Dolan	Chile	1:00.00	
15	2	3	Karen Riveros	Paraguay	1:00.22	
16	1	1	Maria Rivera Pinto	Bolivia	1:00.26	
17	2	2	Jessica Cattaneo Paulista	Peru	1:00.39	
18	1	7	Maria Arrua Villagra	Paraguay	1:00.57	
19	1	6	Nicole Marmol Gilbert	Ecuador	1:00.91	
20	3	1	Sofia Usher Grua	Uruguay	1:00.96	
21	2	7	Carolina Cazot Tort	Uruguay	1:03.27	

=== Final ===
The final was held on March 8, at 19:38.

Rank	Lane	Name	Nationality	Time	Notes
1st place, gold medalist(s)	5	Larissa Oliveira	Brazil	55.70	CR
2nd place, silver medalist(s)	4	Graciele Herrmann	Brazil	56.36	
3rd place, bronze medalist(s)	3	Chinyere Pigot	Suriname	56.92	
3rd place, bronze medalist(s)	6	Arlene Semeco	Venezuela	56.92	
5	7	Jessica Camposano	Colombia	56.96	
6	2	Aixa Triay	Argentina	57.69	
7	1	Erika Torrellas	Venezuela	57.72	
8	8	Loren Bahamonde Cabello	Ecuador	58.12	
