= Swimming at the 2010 South American Games – Women's 4 × 100 metre freestyle relay =

The Women's 4 × 100 m freestyle relay event at the 2010 South American Games was held on March 28 at 18:35.

== Medalists ==
Gold	Silver	Bronze
Daynara de Paula; Flavia Cazziolato; Alessandra Marchioro; Tatiana Barbosa; Brazil	Manuela Morano; Cecilia Biagioli; Aixa Jazmin Triay; Nadia Colovini; Argentina	Jeserik Pinto; Ximena Vilar; Yanel Pinto; Arlene Semeco; Venezuela

== Records ==
Standing records prior to the 2010 South American Games
World record	Netherlands	3:31.72	Rome, Italy	26 July 2009
Competition Record	Brazil	3:53.16	Buenos Aires, Argentina	17 November 2006
South American record	Brazil	3:41.49	Palhoça, Brazil	6 September 2009

== Results ==
=== Final ===
Rank	Lane	Athlete	Result	Notes
1st place, gold medalist(s)	4	Brazil	3:48.34	CR
1st place, gold medalist(s)	4	Daynara de Paula	57.10	CR
1st place, gold medalist(s)	4	Flavia Cazziolato	56.58	CR
1st place, gold medalist(s)	4	Alessandra Marchioro	56.36	CR
1st place, gold medalist(s)	4	Tatiana Barbosa	57.30	CR
2nd place, silver medalist(s)	5	Argentina	3:52.05	
2nd place, silver medalist(s)	5	Manuela Morano	58.96	
2nd place, silver medalist(s)	5	Cecilia Biagioli	57.82	
2nd place, silver medalist(s)	5	Aixa Jazmin Triay	57.74	
2nd place, silver medalist(s)	5	Nadia Colovini	57.53	
3rd place, bronze medalist(s)	3	Venezuela	3:53.80	
3rd place, bronze medalist(s)	3	Jeserik Pinto	59.39	
3rd place, bronze medalist(s)	3	Ximena Vilar	58.78	
3rd place, bronze medalist(s)	3	Yanel Pinto	59.14	
3rd place, bronze medalist(s)	3	Arlene Semeco	56.49	
4	6	Colombia	3:56.46	
4	6	Carolina Colorado Henao	57.90	
4	6	Erika Stewart	58.46	
4	6	María Clara Sosa	1:00.53	
4	6	Carmen Maury	59.57	
5	7	Peru	4:04.70	
5	7	Daniela Kaori Coello	1:01.22	
5	7	Maria Graciela Rosales	59.64	
5	7	Massie Milagros Yong	1:02.46	
5	7	Maria Alejandra Perez	1:01.38	
6	2	Ecuador	4:08.71	
6	2	Yamilé Bahamonde	1:00.71	
6	2	Diana An Yu Ibarra	1:01.98	
6	2	Samantha Arévalo	1:03.37	
6	2	Nicole Maria Gilbert	1:02.65	
7	1	Uruguay	4:10.23	
7	1	Ines Remersaro	1:01.14	
7	1	Antonella Scanavino	1:02.77	
7	1	Maria Sanchez	1:05.15	
7	1	Raissa Andrea Guerra	1:01.17	
8	8	Paraguay	4:17.14	
8	8	Maria Huerta	1:03.05	
8	8	Lujan Vargas	1:04.11	
8	8	Silvana Valenzuela	1:06.49	
8	8	Andrea Maria Ramirez	1:03.49	
