= Swimming at the 2010 South American Games – Women's 50 metre breaststroke =

The Women's 50m breaststroke event at the 2010 South American Games was held on March 26, with the heats at 10:06 and the Final at 18:02.

== Medalists ==
Gold	Silver	Bronze
Ana Carvalho; Brazil	Alessandra Marchioro; Brazil	Agustina de Giovanni; Argentina

== Records ==
Standing records prior to the 2010 South American Games
World record	Jessica Hardy (USA)	29.80	Federal Way, United States	7 August 2009
Competition Record	Javiera Salcedo (ARG)	33.12	Buenos Aires, Argentina	15 November 2006
South American record	Tatiane Sakemi (BRA)	30.81	Rio de Janeiro, Brazil	8 May 2009

== Results ==
=== Heats ===
Rank	Athlete	Result	Notes
1	Alessandra Marchioro (BRA)	32.26	Q CR
2	Agustina de Giovanni (ARG)	32.82	Q
3	Ana Carvalho (BRA)	33.26	Q
4	Daniela Victoria (VEN)	33.65	Q
5	Mercedes Toledo (VEN)	33.92	Q
6	Monica Álvarez (COL)	33.96	Q
7	Malena Coschiza (ARG)	33.99	Q
8	Ashley Bransford (ARU)	34.92	Q
9	Laura Galarza (COL)	35.21	
10	Raysa Malu Ruiz (PER)	36.05	
11	Nilshaira Isenia (AHO)	36.49	
12	Camila Espiniosa (ECU)	36.89	
13	Patricia Mariana San Martin (PER)	37.07	
14	Carla Bastidas Torres (ECU)	37.51	
15	Lujan Amarilla Vargas (PAR)	37.88	
16	Silvana Andrea Valenzuela (PAR)	38.60	
	Mariana Vaca Diez (BOL)	DNS	

=== Final ===
Rank	Athlete	Result	Notes
1st place, gold medalist(s)	Ana Carvalho (BRA)	32.66	
2nd place, silver medalist(s)	Alessandra Marchioro (BRA)	32.67	
3rd place, bronze medalist(s)	Agustina de Giovanni (ARG)	33.24	
4	Malena Coschiza (ARG)	33.54	
5	Monica Álvarez (COL)	33.74	
6	Mercedes Toledo (VEN)	34.04	
7	Daniela Victoria (VEN)	34.07	
8	Ashley Bransford (ARU)	35.74	
