= Swimming at the 2003 Pan American Games – Women's 4 × 100 metre freestyle relay =

The Women's 4x100m Freestyle Relay event at the 2003 Pan American Games took place on August 14, 2003 (Day 13 of the Games).

== Medalists ==
Gold	Amanda Weir; Christina Swindle; Colleen Lanné; Courtney Shealy; United States
Silver	Audrey Lacroix; Elizabeth Collins; Joanne Malar-Morreale; Kelly Doody; Canada
Bronze	Flávia Delaroli; Rebeca Gusmão; Monique Ferreira; Tatiana Lima; Brazil

== Records ==
Record	Nation	Time	Date	Location
World Record	Germany	3:36.00	2002-07-29	Berlin, Germany
Pan Am Record	United States	3:44.71	1995-03-14	Mar del Plata, Argentina

== Results ==
Place	Nation	Swimmers	Heats		Final
Place	Nation	Swimmers	Time	Rank	Time
1	United States	♦ Amanda Weir ♦ Christina Swindle ♦ Colleen Lanné ♦ Courtney Shealy	—	—	3:41.93 GR
2	Canada	♦ Audrey Lacroix ♦ Elizabeth Collins ♦ Joanne Malar-Morreale ♦ Kelly Doody	—	—	3:46.65
3	Brazil	♦ Flávia Delaroli ♦ Rebeca Gusmão ♦ Monique Ferreira ♦ Tatiana Lima	—	—	3:47.05
4	Venezuela	♦ Carolina Rivera ♦ Diana López ♦ Ximena Vilar ♦ Arlene Semeco	—	—	3:52.07 NR
5	Jamaica	♦ Alia Atkinson ♦ Janelle Atkinson ♦ Angela Chuck ♦ Tamara Swaby	—	—	3:53.58 NR
6	Mexico	♦ ♦ ♦ ♦	—	—	3:56.56
7	Puerto Rico	♦ ♦ ♦ ♦	—	—	3:59.91
8	Trinidad and Tobago	♦ ♦ ♦ ♦	—	—	4:00.37
