= Swimming at the 2010 South American Games – Women's 50 metre freestyle =

The Women's 50m freestyle event at the 2010 South American Games was held on March 29, with the heats at 10:00 and the Final at 18:00.

== Medalists ==
Gold	Silver	Bronze
Flávia Cazziolato; Brazil	Arlene Semeco; Venezuela	Daynara de Paula; Brazil

== Records ==
Standing records prior to the 2010 South American Games
World record	Britta Steffen (GER)	23.63	Rome, Italy	2 August 2009
Competition Record	Arlene Semeco (VEN)	25.82	Buenos Aires, Argentina	18 November 2006
South American record	Arlene Semeco (VEN)	24.76	Rome, Italy	1 August 2009

== Results ==
=== Heats ===
Rank	Heat	Lane	Athlete	Result	Notes
1	1	4	Flávia Cazziolato (BRA)	25.51	Q CR
2	3	4	Arlene Semeco (VEN)	25.82	Q
3	2	4	Daynara de Paula (BRA)	26.12	Q
4	3	3	Aixa Jazmin Triay (ARG)	26.34	Q
5	3	5	Loren Yamile Cabello (ECU)	26.84	Q
6	2	5	Nadia Soledad Colovini (ARG)	26.94	Q
7	2	3	Isabella Arcila (COL)	26.97	Q
8	1	5	Ximena Vilar (VEN)	27.04	Q
9	2	2	Maria Wong Rosales (PER)	27.10	NR
10	3	6	Chinyere Pigot (SUR)	27.15	
11	1	3	María Clara Sosa (COL)	27.40	
12	1	6	Raissa Andrea Guerra (URU)	28.07	
13	1	2	Maria Nery Huerta (PAR)	28.08	
14	3	7	Chandel Domaso (SUR)	28.22	
15	1	7	Nilshaira Isenia (AHO)	28.63	
16	3	1	Lujan Vargas (PAR)	28.70	
17	2	6	Karen Torrez Guzman (BOL)	28.72	
18	3	2	Maria Sanchez (URU)	28.93	
19	2	7	Massie Yong (PER)	29.25	
20	2	1	Maria Quintanilla (BOL)	29.28	

=== Final ===
Rank	Lane	Athlete	Result	Notes
1st place, gold medalist(s)	4	Flávia Cazziolato (BRA)	25.37	CR
2nd place, silver medalist(s)	5	Arlene Semeco (VEN)	25.51	
3rd place, bronze medalist(s)	3	Daynara de Paula (BRA)	25.94	
4	2	Loren Yamile Cabello (ECU)	26.53	
5	6	Aica Jazmin Triay (ARG)	26.65	
6	1	Isabella Arcila (COL)	26.95	
7	7	Nadia Soledad Colovini (ARG)	27.20	
8	2	Ximena Vilar (VEN)	27.32	
