= Results breakdown of the 2022 Portuguese legislative election =

2022 Portuguese legislative election
- 30 January 2022
- All 230 seats in the Assembly of the Republic; 116 seats needed for a majority
- Turnout: 51.5%
Party	Leader	Vote %	Seats	+/–
PS	António Costa	41.4%	120	+12
PSD (Note: In Azores and Madeira, the PSD ran in coalitions with the CDS – People's Party (CDS–PP) and PPM, and the 5 MPs elected in these coalitions are all from the PSD, so the results of these coalitions are added in the nationwide results for the PSD.)	Rui Rio	29.1%	77	−2
CH	André Ventura	7.2%	12	+11
IL	João Cotrim de Figueiredo	4.9%	8	+7
CDU	Jerónimo de Sousa	4.3%	6	−6
BE	Catarina Martins	4.4%	5	−14
PAN	Inês Sousa Real	1.6%	1	−3
LIVRE	Collective leadership (Note: Rui Tavares, running for Lisbon, was the party's main candidate in this campaign.)	1.3%	1	0
This lists parties that won seats. See the complete results below.
Prime Minister before	Prime Minister after
António Costa; PS	António Costa; PS

This is the results breakdown of the Assembly of the Republic election held in Portugal on 30 January 2022. The following tables show detailed results in each of the country's 22 electoral constituencies.

Controversies and accusations following the counting of overseas ballots, the Constitutional Court forced the repetition of the election in the Europe constituency, which elected two MPs. The rerun of the election in the overseas constituency of Europe occurred, for in person voting, on 12 and 13 March 2022, and postal ballots were received until 23 March 2022. The final, certified election results were published in the official journal, Diário da República, on 26 March 2022.

== Electoral system ==
The Assembly of the Republic has 230 members elected to four-year terms. The number of seats to be elected by each district depends on the district magnitude. 226 seats are allocated proportionally by the number of registered voters in the 18 Districts in Mainland Portugal, plus Azores and Madeira, and 4 fixed seats are allocated for overseas voters, 2 seats for voters in Europe and another 2 seats for voters Outside Europe. The 230 members of Parliament are elected using the D'Hondt method and by a closed list proportional representation system. Members represent the country as a whole and not the constituencies in which they were elected.

== Summary ==
=== Nationwide results ===
Summary of the 30 January 2022 Assembly of the Republic elections results
Parties	Votes	%	±pp swing	MPs				
Parties	Votes	%	±pp swing	2019	2022	±	%	±
Socialist	2,302,601	41.38	▲5.1	108	120	▲12	52.17	▲5.2
Social Democratic (Note: Only in mainland Portugal)	1,539,415	27.66	▲1.3	74	72	▼2	31.30	▼0.8
Chega	399,659	7.18	▲5.9	1	12	▲11	5.22	▲4.8
Liberal Initiative	273,687	4.92	▲3.6	1	8	▲7	3.48	▲3.0
Left Bloc	244,603	4.40	▼5.1	19	5	▼14	2.17	▼6.2
Unitary Democratic Coalition	238,920	4.29	▼2.0	12	6	▼6	2.61	▼2.6
People's	89,181	1.60	▼2.4	5	0	▼5	0.00	▼2.2
People–Animals–Nature	88,152	1.58	▼1.7	4	1	▼3	0.43	▼1.3
LIVRE	71,232	1.28	▲0.2	1	1	0	0.43	0.0
Madeira First (PSD/CDS–PP) (Note: In Madeira, the PSD and the CDS–PP contested the elections in a coalition called Madeira First (Madeira Primeiro).)	50,636	0.91	▼0.2	3	3	0	1.30	0.0
Democratic Alliance (PSD/CDS–PP/PPM) (Note: In Azores, the PSD, the CDS–PP, and the People's Monarchist Party (PPM) contested the elections in a coalition called Democratic Alliance (Aliança Democrática).)	28,330	0.51	▼0.1	2	2	0	0.87	0.0
React, Include, Recycle	23,233	0.42	▼0.3	0	0	0	0.00	0.0
Portuguese Workers' Communist	11,265	0.20	▼0.5	0	0	0	0.00	0.0
National Democratic Alternative (Note: In September 2021, the Democratic Republican Party (PDR) changed its name to the National Democratic Alternative (ADN).)	10,874	0.20	▲0.0	0	0	0	0.00	0.0
Together for the People	10,786	0.19	▼0.0	0	0	0	0.00	0.0
Earth	7,561	0.14	▼0.1	0	0	0	0.00	0.0
Volt Portugal	6,240	0.11	—N/a	—N/a	0	—N/a	0.00	—N/a
Socialist Alternative Movement	6,157	0.11	▲0.0	0	0	0	0.00	0.0
Rise Up (Note: In July 2020, the National Renovator Party (PNR) changed its name to Rise Up (E).)	5,043	0.09	▼0.2	0	0	0	0.00	0.0
We, the Citizens!	3,880	0.07	▼0.1	0	0	0	0.00	0.0
Labour	3,533	0.06	▼0.1	0	0	0	0.00	0.0
Alliance	2,467	0.04	▼0.7	0	0	0	0.00	0.0
People's Monarchist (Note: PPM list only in Madeira)	260	0.00	▼0.2	0	0	0	0.00	0.0
Total valid	5,417,715	97.36	▲2.3	230	230	0	100.00	0
Blank ballots	63,103	1.13	▼1.4					
Invalid ballots	83,721	1.50	▼0.9					
Total	5,564,539	100.00						
Registered voters/turnout	10,813,246	51.46	▲2.9					
Source: Comissão Nacional de Eleições

== Results by constituency ==
=== Azores ===
Summary of the 30 January 2022 Assembly of the Republic elections results in Azores
Parties	Votes	%	±pp swing	MPs		
Parties	Votes	%	±pp swing	2019	2022	±
Socialist	36,025	42.84	▲2.7	3	3	0
Democratic Alliance (PSD/CDS–PP/PPM)	28,330	33.92	▼1.6	2	2	0
Chega	4,986	5.93	▲5.0	0	0	0
Left Bloc	3,589	4.27	▼3.7	0	0	0
Liberal Initiative	3,454	4.11	▲3.4	0	0	0
Unitary Democratic Coalition	1,250	1.49	▼1.0	0	0	0
People–Animals–Nature	1,156	1.37	▼1.3	0	0	0
LIVRE	773	0.92	▲0.0	0	0	0
National Democratic Alternative	484	0.58	▲0.5	0	0	0
Portuguese Workers' Communist	321	0.38	▼0.2	0	0	0
React, Include, Recycle	201	0.24	—N/a	0	0	—N/a
Earth	150	0.18	▼0.2	0	0	0
Socialist Alternative Movement	87	0.10	▼0.0	0	0	0
Volt Portugal	67	0.08	—N/a	—N/a	0	—N/a
Rise Up	55	0.07	▼0.2	0	0	0
Total valid	81,118	96.47	▲2.8	5	5	0
Blank ballots	2,076	2.47	▼2.2			
Invalid ballots	890	1.06	▼0.5			
Total	84,084	100.00				
Registered voters/turnout	229,022	36.71	▲0.2			
Source: Resultados Açores

=== Aveiro ===
Summary of the 30 January 2022 Assembly of the Republic elections results in Aveiro
Parties	Votes	%	±pp swing	MPs		
Parties	Votes	%	±pp swing	2019	2022	±
Socialist	144,198	39.52	▲5.2	7	8	▲1
Social Democratic	130,192	35.68	▲2.2	6	7	▲1
Chega	20,562	5.64	▲4.9	0	1	▲1
Left Bloc	16,708	4.58	▼5.4	2	0	▼2
Liberal Initiative	16,294	4.47	▲3.5	0	0	0
People's	8,962	2.46	▼3.2	1	0	▼1
Unitary Democratic Coalition	6,551	1.80	▼1.3	0	0	0
People–Animals–Nature	4,604	1.26	▼1.7	0	0	0
LIVRE	2,878	0.79	▲0.1	0	0	0
React, Include, Recycle	1,815	0.50	▼0.3	0	0	0
Portuguese Workers' Communist	1,409	0.39	▼0.1	0	0	0
National Democratic Alternative	676	0.19	▲0.0	0	0	0
Earth	504	0.18	▼0.1	0	0	0
Volt Portugal	431	0.12	—N/a	—N/a	0	—N/a
Socialist Alternative Movement	405	0.11	—N/a	—N/a	0	—N/a
Rise Up	217	0.06	▼0.1	0	0	0
Together for the People	192	0.05	▼0.0	0	0	0
Total valid	356,598	97.74	▲2.5	16	16	0
Blank ballots	4,739	1.30	▼1.7			
Invalid ballots	3,521	0.97	▼0.8			
Total	364,858	100.00				
Registered voters/turnout	642,602	56.78	▲2.2			
Source: Resultados Aveiro

=== Beja ===
Summary of the 30 January 2022 Assembly of the Republic elections results in Beja
Parties	Votes	%	±pp swing	MPs		
Parties	Votes	%	±pp swing	2019	2022	±
Socialist	29,533	43.73	▲3.0	2	2	0
Unitary Democratic Coalition	12,442	18.42	▼4.4	1	1	0
Social Democratic	10,767	15.94	▲2.6	0	0	0
Chega	6,932	10.27	▲8.3	0	0	0
Left Bloc	2,511	3.72	▼5.4	0	0	0
Liberal Initiative	1,388	2.06	▲1.4	0	0	0
People–Animals–Nature	597	0.88	▼1.1	0	0	0
People's	515	0.76	▼1.5	0	0	0
LIVRE	491	0.73	▲0.1	0	0	0
Portuguese Workers' Communist	415	0.61	▼0.7	0	0	0
React, Include, Recycle	156	0.23	—N/a	—N/a	0	—N/a
Volt Portugal	103	0.15	—N/a	—N/a	0	—N/a
Earth	89	0.13	▼0.2	0	0	0
Rise Up	78	0.12	▼0.2	0	0	0
Socialist Alternative Movement	62	0.09	—N/a	—N/a	0	—N/a
Labour	45	0.07	▼0.0	0	0	0
Total valid	66,124	97.92	▲1.7	3	3	0
Blank ballots	767	1.14	▼1.0			
Invalid ballots	639	0.95	▼0.7			
Total	67,530	100.00				
Registered voters/turnout	120,888	55.86	▲3.6			
Source: Resultados Beja

=== Braga ===
Summary of the 30 January 2022 Assembly of the Republic elections results in Braga
Parties	Votes	%	±pp swing	MPs		
Parties	Votes	%	±pp swing	2019	2022	±
Socialist	207,793	42.02	▲5.6	8	9	▲1
Social Democratic	172,007	34.78	▲0.7	8	8	0
Chega	28,746	5.81	▲5.1	0	1	▲1
Liberal Initiative	21,432	4.33	▲3.5	0	1	▲1
Left Bloc	18,558	3.75	▼5.1	2	0	▼2
Unitary Democratic Coalition	12,993	2.63	▼1.3	0	0	0
People's	8,215	1.66	▼2.4	1	0	▼1
People–Animals–Nature	5,907	1.19	▼1.4	0	0	0
LIVRE	3,925	0.79	▲0.1	0	0	0
React, Include, Recycle	1,767	0.36	▼0.4	0	0	0
Socialist Alternative Movement	549	0.11	▼0.0	0	0	0
Rise Up	494	0.10	▼0.1	0	0	0
Together for the People	481	0.10	▲0.0	0	0	0
Labour	460	0.09	▼0.0	0	0	0
Earth	453	0.09	▼0.1	0	0	0
Volt Portugal	357	0.07	—N/a	—N/a	0	—N/a
Alliance	286	0.06	▼0.4	0	0	0
Total valid	484,423	97.96	▲2.8	19	19	0
Blank ballots	6,152	1.24	▼1.9			
Invalid ballots	3,937	0.80	▼0.9			
Total	494,512	100.00				
Registered voters/turnout	776,539	63.68	▲3.9			
Source: Resultados Braga

=== Bragança ===
Summary of the 30 January 2022 Assembly of the Republic elections results in Bragança
Parties	Votes	%	±pp swing	MPs		
Parties	Votes	%	±pp swing	2019	2022	±
Socialist	26,495	40.30	▲3.8	1	2	▲1
Social Democratic	26,480	40.28	▼0.5	2	1	▼1
Chega	5,619	8.55	▲7.7	0	0	0
Left Bloc	1,371	2.09	▼3.9	0	0	0
People's	1,368	2.08	▼2.4	0	0	0
Liberal Initiative	1,049	1.60	▲1.2	0	0	0
Unitary Democratic Coalition	892	1.36	▼0.8	0	0	0
People–Animals–Nature	397	0.60	▼0.7	0	0	0
React, Include, Recycle	249	0.38	▼0.2	0	0	0
LIVRE	230	0.35	▼0.0	0	0	0
Earth	91	0.14	—N/a	—N/a	0	—N/a
Rise Up	64	0.10	▼0.2	0	0	0
Socialist Alternative Movement	54	0.08	—N/a	—N/a	0	—N/a
Total valid	64,359	97.90	▲2.2	3	3	0
Blank ballots	567	0.86	▼1.2			
Invalid ballots	816	1.24	▼1.0			
Total	65,742	100.00				
Registered voters/turnout	137,572	47.79	▲2.9			
Source: Resultados Bragança

=== Castelo Branco ===
Summary of the 30 January 2022 Assembly of the Republic elections results in Castelo Branco
Parties	Votes	%	±pp swing	MPs		
Parties	Votes	%	±pp swing	2019	2022	±
Socialist	45,622	47.65	▲6.8	3	3	0
Social Democratic	26,237	27.40	▲1.1	1	1	0
Chega	7,958	8.31	▲7.0	0	0	0
Left Bloc	4,069	4.25	▼6.8	0	0	0
Unitary Democratic Coalition	2,784	2.91	▼1.8	0	0	0
Liberal Initiative	2,443	2.55	▲2.0	0	0	0
People's	1,497	1.56	▼2.2	0	0	0
People–Animals–Nature	935	0.98	▼1.4	0	0	0
LIVRE	774	0.81	▼0.1	0	0	0
Portuguese Workers' Communist	313	0.33	▼0.5	0	0	0
React, Include, Recycle	239	0.25	▼0.3	0	0	0
National Democratic Alternative	182	0.19	▲0.1	0	0	0
Earth	154	0.16	▼0.0	0	0	0
Socialist Alternative Movement	91	0.10	—N/a	—N/a	0	—N/a
We, the Citizens!	78	0.08	—N/a	—N/a	0	—N/a
Rise Up	59	0.06	▼0.2	0	0	0
Labour	43	0.04	▼0.2	0	0	0
Total valid	93,478	97.63	▲2.4	4	4	0
Blank ballots	1,117	1.17	▼1.2			
Invalid ballots	1,148	1.20	▼1.2			
Total	95,743	100.00				
Registered voters/turnout	166,269	57.58	▲2.5			
Source: Resultados Castelo Branco

=== Coimbra ===
Summary of the 30 January 2022 Assembly of the Republic elections results in Coimbra
Parties	Votes	%	±pp swing	MPs		
Parties	Votes	%	±pp swing	2019	2022	±
Socialist	97,310	45.23	▲6.2	5	6	▲1
Social Democratic	62,718	29.15	▲2.5	3	3	0
Chega	13,180	6.13	▲5.2	0	0	0
Left Bloc	10,957	5.09	▼6.1	1	0	▼1
Liberal Initiative	7,779	3.62	▲2.8	0	0	0
Unitary Democratic Coalition	7,294	3.39	▼2.2	0	0	0
People's	3,244	1.51	▼2.0	0	0	0
People–Animals–Nature	2,571	1.20	▼1.4	0	0	0
LIVRE	2,195	1.02	▲0.1	0	0	0
React, Include, Recycle	706	0.33	▼0.3	0	0	0
Portuguese Workers' Communist	542	0.25	▼0.3	0	0	0
Alliance	322	0.15	▼0.9	0	0	0
Volt Portugal	255	0.12	—N/a	—N/a	0	—N/a
Socialist Alternative Movement	242	0.11	▼0.0	0	0	0
Earth	203	0.09	▼0.1	0	0	0
Rise Up	120	0.06	▼0.2	0	0	0
Total valid	209,638	97.45	▲2.7	9	9	0
Blank ballots	3,120	1.45	▼1.9			
Invalid ballots	2,364	1.10	▼0.8			
Total	215,122	100.00				
Registered voters/turnout	374,935	57.38	▲3.7			
Source: Resultados Coimbra

=== Évora ===
Summary of the 30 January 2022 Assembly of the Republic elections results in Évora
Parties	Votes	%	±pp swing	MPs		
Parties	Votes	%	±pp swing	2019	2022	±
Socialist	34,693	43.95	▲5.6	2	2	0
Social Democratic	16,902	21.41	▲3.9	0	1	▲1
Unitary Democratic Coalition	11,494	14.56	▼4.3	1	0	▼1
Chega	7,222	9.15	▲6.9	0	0	0
Left Bloc	2,628	3.33	▼5.6	0	0	0
Liberal Initiative	1,947	2.47	▲1.8	0	0	0
People's	896	1.14	▼2.3	0	0	0
People–Animals–Nature	665	0.84	▼1.1	0	0	0
LIVRE	496	0.63	▼0.1	0	0	0
React, Include, Recycle	263	0.33	▼0.1	0	0	0
Volt Portugal	96	0.12	—N/a	—N/a	0	—N/a
Socialist Alternative Movement	77	0.10	—N/a	—N/a	0	—N/a
Earth	63	0.08	▼0.1	0	0	0
Rise Up	56	0.07	▼0.1	0	0	0
Labour	42	0.05	▼0.0	0	0	0
Total valid	77,540	98.23	▲1.9	3	3	0
Blank ballots	843	1.07	▼1.2			
Invalid ballots	557	0.71	▼0.7			
Total	78,940	100.00				
Registered voters/turnout	134,828	58.55	▲4.4			
Source: Resultados Évora

=== Faro ===
Summary of the 30 January 2022 Assembly of the Republic elections results in Faro
Parties	Votes	%	±pp swing	MPs		
Parties	Votes	%	±pp swing	2019	2022	±
Socialist	77,740	39.87	▲3.1	5	5	0
Social Democratic	47,471	24.35	▲2.1	3	3	0
Chega	23,988	12.30	▲10.2	0	1	▲1
Left Bloc	11,226	5.76	▼6.5	1	0	▼1
Unitary Democratic Coalition	9,379	4.81	▼2.2	0	0	0
Liberal Initiative	9,042	4.64	▲3.8	0	0	0
People–Animals–Nature	4,213	2.16	▼2.6	0	0	0
LIVRE	2,111	1.09	▲0.1	0	0	0
People's	2,109	1.09	▼2.7	0	0	0
National Democratic Alternative	1,152	0.59	▲0.4	0	0	0
React, Include, Recycle	759	0.39	▼0.2	0	0	0
Earth	383	0.20	▼0.2	0	0	0
Socialist Alternative Movement	286	0.15	—N/a	—N/a	0	—N/a
Labour	250	0.13	▼0.1	0	0	0
Rise Up	220	0.11	▼0.3	0	0	0
Volt Portugal	210	0.11	—N/a	—N/a	0	—N/a
Total valid	190,539	97.73	▲2.3	9	9	0
Blank ballots	2,599	1.33	▼1.5			
Invalid ballots	1,829	0.94	▼0.9			
Total	194,967	100.00				
Registered voters/turnout	380,371	51.26	▲5.4			
Source: Resultados Faro

=== Guarda ===
Summary of the 30 January 2022 Assembly of the Republic elections results in Guarda
Parties	Votes	%	±pp swing	MPs		
Parties	Votes	%	±pp swing	2019	2022	±
Socialist	34,685	45.10	▲7.5	2	2	0
Social Democratic	25,776	33.52	▼0.8	1	1	0
Chega	6,116	7.95	▲6.5	0	0	0
Left Bloc	2,359	3.07	▼4.7	0	0	0
People's	1,699	2.21	▼2.8	0	0	0
Liberal Initiative	1,487	1.93	▲1.6	0	0	0
Unitary Democratic Coalition	1,360	1.77	▼1.2	0	0	0
People–Animals–Nature	504	0.66	▼0.9	0	0	0
LIVRE	413	0.54	▲0.0	0	0	0
React, Include, Recycle	341	0.44	▼0.2	0	0	0
Rise Up	120	0.16	▼0.0	0	0	0
Volt Portugal	117	0.15	—N/a	—N/a	0	—N/a
Earth	69	0.09	▼0.1	0	0	0
Labour	66	0.09	▼0.1	0	0	0
Socialist Alternative Movement	65	0.08	—N/a	—N/a	0	—N/a
Total valid	75,177	97.76	▲3.1	3	3	0
Blank ballots	774	1.01	▼1.6			
Invalid ballots	950	1.24	▼1.5			
Total	76,901	100.00				
Registered voters/turnout	145,852	52.73	▲2.1			
Source: Resultados Guarda

=== Leiria ===
Summary of the 30 January 2022 Assembly of the Republic elections results in Leiria
Parties	Votes	%	±pp swing	MPs		
Parties	Votes	%	±pp swing	2019	2022	±
Socialist	84,253	35.73	▲4.6	4	5	▲1
Social Democratic	81,778	34.68	▲1.2	5	4	▼1
Chega	18,918	8.02	▲6.5	0	1	▲1
Liberal Initiative	12,400	5.26	▲4.1	0	0	0
Left Bloc	10,711	4.54	▼4.8	1	0	▼1
Unitary Democratic Coalition	7,340	3.11	▼1.2	0	0	0
People's	4,830	2.05	▼3.3	0	0	0
People–Animals–Nature	3,090	1.31	▼1.6	0	0	0
LIVRE	2,469	1.05	▼0.2	0	0	0
React, Include, Recycle	1,199	0.51	▼0.2	0	0	0
National Democratic Alternative	783	0.33	▲0.1	0	0	0
We, the Citizens!	376	0.16	▼0.1	0	0	0
Earth	353	0.15	▼0.2	0	0	0
Socialist Alternative Movement	264	0.11	▲0.0	0	0	0
Volt Portugal	209	0.09	—N/a	—N/a	0	—N/a
Rise Up	173	0.07	▼0.2	0	0	0
Labour	137	0.06	▼0.1	0	0	0
Total valid	229,287	97.25	▲3.2	10	10	0
Blank ballots	3,809	1.62	▼2.1			
Invalid ballots	2,685	1.14	▼1.2			
Total	235,781	100.00				
Registered voters/turnout	413,083	57.08	▲3.2			
Source: Resultados Leiria

=== Lisbon ===
Summary of the 30 January 2022 Assembly of the Republic elections results in Lisbon
Parties	Votes	%	±pp swing	MPs		
Parties	Votes	%	±pp swing	2019	2022	±
Socialist	482,606	40.83	▲4.1	20	21	▲1
Social Democratic	285,522	24.16	▲1.6	12	13	▲1
Liberal Initiative	93,341	7.90	▲5.4	1	4	▲3
Chega	91,889	7.77	▲5.8	1	4	▲3
Unitary Democratic Coalition	59,995	5.08	▼2.7	4	2	▼2
Left Bloc	55,786	4.72	▼5.0	5	2	▼3
LIVRE	28,834	2.44	▲0.3	1	1	0
People–Animals–Nature	23,577	1.99	▼2.4	2	1	▼1
People's	19,524	1.65	▼2.7	2	0	▼2
Portuguese Workers' Communist	4,916	0.42	▼0.4	0	0	0
National Democratic Alternative	3,249	0.27	▲0.1	0	0	0
React, Include, Recycle	3,035	0.26	▼0.1	0	0	0
Earth	1,485	0.13	▼0.2	0	0	0
Socialist Alternative Movement	1,452	0.12	▲0.0	0	0	0
Volt Portugal	1,369	0.12	—N/a	—N/a	0	—N/a
Together for the People	971	0.08	—N/a	—N/a	0	—N/a
We, the Citizens!	879	0.07	▼0.2	0	0	0
Rise Up	816	0.07	▼0.3	0	0	0
Alliance	749	0.06	▼1.2	0	0	0
Labour	555	0.05	▼0.0	0	0	0
Total valid	1,160,550	98.20	▲1.8	48	48	0
Blank ballots	11,891	1.01	▼1.1			
Invalid ballots	9,433	0.80	▼0.7			
Total	1,181,874	100.00				
Registered voters/turnout	1,919,958	61.56	▲4.3			
Source: Resultados Lisboa

=== Madeira ===
Summary of the 30 January 2022 Assembly of the Republic elections results in Madeira
Parties	Votes	%	±pp swing	MPs		
Parties	Votes	%	±pp swing	2019	2022	±
Madeira First (PSD/CDS–PP)	50,638	39.83	▼3.4	3	3	0
Socialist	40,004	31.47	▼1.9	3	3	0
Together for the People	8,721	6.86	▲1.4	0	0	0
Chega	7,727	6.08	▲5.4	0	0	0
Liberal Initiative	4,241	3.34	▲2.6	0	0	0
Left Bloc	4,109	3.23	▼2.0	0	0	0
Unitary Democratic Coalition	2,581	2.03	▼0.1	0	0	0
People–Animals–Nature	2,084	1.64	▼0.2	0	0	0
LIVRE	913	0.72	▲0.3	0	0	0
Labour	689	0.54	▼0.4	0	0	0
React, Include, Recycle	554	0.44	▼0.5	0	0	0
National Democratic Alternative	550	0.43	▲0.1	0	0	0
Earth	462	0.36	0.0	0	0	0
People's Monarchist	260	0.20	▲0.1	0	0	0
Socialist Alternative Movement	244	0.19	—N/a	—N/a	0	—N/a
Rise Up	234	0.18	▲0.0	0	0	0
Total valid	124,007	97.56	▼0.1	6	6	0
Blank ballots	781	0.61	▲0.1			
Invalid ballots	2,323	1.83	▲0.0			
Total	127,111	100.00				
Registered voters/turnout	256,431	49.57	▼0.7			
Source: Resultados Madeira

=== Portalegre ===
Summary of the 30 January 2022 Assembly of the Republic elections results in Portalegre
Parties	Votes	%	±pp swing	MPs		
Parties	Votes	%	±pp swing	2019	2022	±
Socialist	25,271	47.21	▲2.6	2	2	0
Social Democratic	12,432	23.23	▲3.1	0	0	0
Chega	6,136	11.46	▲8.7	0	0	0
Unitary Democratic Coalition	4,058	7.58	▼3.0	0	0	0
Left Bloc	1,550	2.90	▼5.2	0	0	0
Liberal Initiative	1,115	2.08	▲1.6	0	0	0
People's	635	1.19	▼2.6	0	0	0
People–Animals–Nature	345	0.64	▼1.1	0	0	0
Portuguese Workers' Communist	304	0.57	▼0.6	0	0	0
LIVRE	295	0.55	▼0.0	0	0	0
React, Include, Recycle	122	0.23	▼0.2	0	0	0
Earth	50	0.09	▼0.1	0	0	0
Socialist Alternative Movement	48	0.09	—N/a	—N/a	0	—N/a
Rise Up	43	0.08	▼0.2	0	0	0
Volt Portugal	35	0.07	—N/a	—N/a	0	—N/a
Labour	16	0.03	▼0.1	0	0	0
Total valid	52,455	98.00	▲2.3	2	2	0
Blank ballots	601	1.12	▼1.2			
Invalid ballots	472	0.88	▼1.0			
Total	53,528	100.00				
Registered voters/turnout	94,374	56.72	▲3.2			
Source: Resultados Portalegre

=== Porto ===
Summary of the 30 January 2022 Assembly of the Republic elections results in Porto
Parties	Votes	%	±pp swing	MPs		
Parties	Votes	%	±pp swing	2019	2022	±
Socialist	418,869	42.53	▲5.9	17	19	▲2
Social Democratic	318,343	32.33	▲1.2	15	14	▼1
Liberal Initiative	50,539	5.11	▲3.6	0	2	▲2
Left Bloc	47,118	4.78	▼5.3	4	2	▼2
Chega	42,998	4.37	▲3.8	0	2	▲2
Unitary Democratic Coalition	32,277	3.28	▼2.7	2	1	▼1
People–Animals–Nature	16,707	1.70	▼1.8	1	0	▼1
People's	14,347	1.46	▼1.8	1	0	▼1
LIVRE	11,433	1.16	▲0.2	0	0	0
React, Include, Recycle	7,212	0.73	▼0.4	0	0	0
National Democratic Alternative	1,430	0.15	0.0	0	0	0
Rise Up	1,007	0.10	▼0.1	0	0	0
We, the Citizens!	922	0.09	▼0.1	0	0	0
Volt Portugal	893	0.09	—N/a	—N/a	0	—N/a
Socialist Alternative Movement	707	0.07	▲0.0	0	0	0
Earth	706	0.07	▼0.1	0	0	0
Labour	421	0.04	▼0.2	0	0	0
Alliance	372	0.04	▼0.5	0	0	0
Together for the People	367	0.04	▼0.1	0	0	0
Total valid	966,488	98.14	▲2.0	40	40	0
Blank ballots	9,993	1.01	▼1.3			
Invalid ballots	8,319	0.84	▼0.8			
Total	984,800	100.00				
Registered voters/turnout	1,592,590	61.84	▲3.3			
Source: Resultados Porto

=== Santarém ===
Summary of the 30 January 2022 Assembly of the Republic elections results in Santarém
Parties	Votes	%	±pp swing	MPs		
Parties	Votes	%	±pp swing	2019	2022	±
Socialist	89,870	41.19	▲4.1	4	5	▲1
Social Democratic	58,630	26.87	▲1.7	3	3	0
Chega	23,813	10.91	▲8.9	0	1	▲1
Unitary Democratic Coalition	11,854	5.43	▼2.2	1	0	▼1
Left Bloc	10,012	4.59	▼5.6	1	0	▼1
Liberal Initiative	8,219	3.77	▲3.0	0	0	0
People's	4,136	1.90	▼2.8	0	0	0
People–Animals–Nature	2,527	1.16	▼1.4	0	0	0
LIVRE	1,932	0.89	▲0.0	0	0	0
React, Include, Recycle	901	0.41	▼0.2	0	0	0
Socialist Alternative Movement	383	0.18	—N/a	—N/a	0	—N/a
Earth	314	0.14	▼0.1	0	0	0
Volt Portugal	311	0.14	—N/a	—N/a	0	—N/a
Rise Up	284	0.13	▼0.3	0	0	0
Labour	162	0.07	▼0.0	0	0	0
Total valid	213,348	97.78	▲2.6	9	9	0
Blank ballots	2,773	1.27	▼1.6			
Invalid ballots	2,071	0.95	▼1.0			
Total	218,192	100.00				
Registered voters/turnout	378,006	57.72	▲3.4			
Source: Resultados Santarém

=== Setúbal ===
Summary of the 30 January 2022 Assembly of the Republic elections results in Setúbal
Parties	Votes	%	±pp swing	MPs		
Parties	Votes	%	±pp swing	2019	2022	±
Socialist	198,104	45.73	▲7.1	9	10	▲1
Social Democratic	69,983	16.15	▲1.8	3	3	0
Unitary Democratic Coalition	43,529	10.05	▼5.7	3	2	▼1
Chega	39,135	9.03	▲7.1	0	1	▲1
Left Bloc	24,931	5.75	▼6.4	2	1	▼1
Liberal Initiative	22,217	5.13	▲4.1	0	1	▲1
People–Animals–Nature	8,639	1.99	▼2.4	1	0	▼1
LIVRE	6,140	1.42	▲0.2	0	0	0
People's	4,869	1.12	▼1.9	0	0	0
Portuguese Workers' Communist	2,525	0.58	▼0.3	0	0	0
React, Include, Recycle	1,429	0.33	▼0.2	0	0	0
National Democratic Alternative	1,307	0.30	▲0.1	0	0	0
Volt Portugal	514	0.12	—N/a	—N/a	0	—N/a
Earth	492	0.11	▼0.2	0	0	0
Socialist Alternative Movement	460	0.11	▲0.0	0	0	0
We, the Citizens!	369	0.09	▼0.2	0	0	0
Rise Up	313	0.07	▼0.4	0	0	0
Labour	225	0.05	▼0.0	0	0	0
Together for the People	203	0.05	—N/a	—N/a	0	—N/a
Total valid	425,364	98.19	▲1.8	18	18	0
Blank ballots	4,422	1.02	▼1.1			
Invalid ballots	3,431	0.79	▼0.7			
Total	433,217	100.00				
Registered voters/turnout	745,593	58.10	▲4.5			
Source: Resultados Setúbal

=== Viana do Castelo ===
Summary of the 30 January 2022 Assembly of the Republic elections results in Viana do Castelo
Parties	Votes	%	±pp swing	MPs		
Parties	Votes	%	±pp swing	2019	2022	±
Socialist	54,435	42.06	▲7.3	3	3	0
Social Democratic	43,414	34.17	▲0.4	3	3	0
Chega	7,702	6.06	▲5.4	0	0	0
Left Bloc	4,418	3.48	▼5.0	0	0	0
People's	4,272	3.36	▼2.8	0	0	0
Unitary Democratic Coalition	3,815	3.00	▼1.0	0	0	0
Liberal Initiative	3,651	2.87	▲2.3	0	0	0
People–Animals–Nature	1,251	0.98	▼1.4	0	0	0
LIVRE	919	0.72	▼0.1	0	0	0
React, Include, Recycle	556	0.44	▼0.5	0	0	0
Earth	190	0.15	▼0.0	0	0	0
Alliance	173	0.14	▼0.5	0	0	0
Socialist Alternative Movement	157	0.12	—N/a	—N/a	0	—N/a
Rise Up	133	0.10	▼0.1	0	0	0
Volt Portugal	130	0.10	—N/a	—N/a	0	—N/a
Total valid	124,216	97.78	▲2.5	6	6	0
Blank ballots	1,654	1.30	▼1.7			
Invalid ballots	1,170	0.92	▼0.9			
Total	127,040	100.00				
Registered voters/turnout	236,042	53.82	▲3.2			
Source: Resultados Viana do Castelo

=== Vila Real ===
Summary of the 30 January 2022 Assembly of the Republic elections results in Vila Real
Parties	Votes	%	±pp swing	MPs		
Parties	Votes	%	±pp swing	2019	2022	±
Socialist	43,489	41.29	▲4.1	2	3	▲1
Social Democratic	42,135	40.01	▲1.0	3	2	▼1
Chega	7,573	7.19	▲6.4	0	0	0
Left Bloc	2,443	2.32	▼3.8	0	0	0
Liberal Initiative	1,898	1.80	▲1.4	0	0	0
Unitary Democratic Coalition	1,775	1.69	▼0.8	0	0	0
People's	1,667	1.58	▼2.9	0	0	0
People–Animals–Nature	812	0.77	▼1.0	0	0	0
LIVRE	574	0.55	0.0	0	0	0
React, Include, Recycle	370	0.35	▼0.3	0	0	0
Socialist Alternative Movement	208	0.20	—N/a	—N/a	0	—N/a
We, the Citizens!	144	0.14	▼0.1	0	0	0
Rise Up	78	0.07	▼0.1	0	0	0
Volt Portugal	76	0.07	—N/a	—N/a	0	—N/a
Earth	62	0.06	—N/a	—N/a	0	—N/a
Total valid	103,304	98.09	▲2.7	5	5	0
Blank ballots	940	0.89	▼1.4			
Invalid ballots	1,075	1.02	▼1.4			
Total	105,319	100.00				
Registered voters/turnout	213,093	49.42	▲3.7			
Source: Resultados Vila Real

=== Viseu ===
Summary of the 30 January 2022 Assembly of the Republic elections results in Viseu
Parties	Votes	%	±pp swing	MPs		
Parties	Votes	%	±pp swing	2019	2022	±
Socialist	76,642	41.55	▲6.2	4	4	0
Social Democratic	67,888	36.81	▲0.6	4	4	0
Chega	14,373	7.19	▲6.2	0	0	0
Left Bloc	5,218	2.83	▼5.1	0	0	0
Liberal Initiative	4,658	2.53	▲2.0	0	0	0
People's	3,788	2.05	▼3.8	0	0	0
Unitary Democratic Coalition	2,982	1.62	▼0.7	0	0	0
People–Animals–Nature	1,671	0.91	▼1.2	0	0	0
LIVRE	1,180	0.64	▲0.1	0	0	0
React, Include, Recycle	682	0.37	▼0.4	0	0	0
Volt Portugal	229	0.16	—N/a	—N/a	0	—N/a
We, the Citizens!	369	0.12	▼0.1	0	0	0
National Democratic Alternative	188	0.10	▲0.2	0	0	0
Rise Up	176	0.10	▼0.1	0	0	0
Earth	156	0.08	▼0.0	0	0	0
Socialist Alternative Movement	145	0.08	—N/a	—N/a	0	—N/a
Labour	128	0.07	▼0.0	0	0	0
Total valid	180,393	97.80	▲2.7	8	8	0
Blank ballots	2,144	1.16	▼1.6			
Invalid ballots	1,907	1.03	▼1.1			
Total	184,444	100.00				
Registered voters/turnout	340,342	54.19	▲3.1			
Source: Resultados Viseu

=== Europe ===
==== Rerun vote ====
Summary of the 12 and 13 March 2022 Assembly of the Republic elections results in Europe
Parties	Votes	%	±pp swing	MPs		
Parties	Votes	%	±pp swing	2019	2022	±
Socialist	36,069	32.98	▲3.9	1	2	▲1
Social Democratic	16,391	14.99	▼3.8	1	0	▼1
Chega	7,756	7.09	▲6.2	0	0	0
People–Animals–Nature	2,954	2.70	▼2.2	0	0	0
Liberal Initiative	2,700	2.47	▲1.7	0	0	0
Left Bloc	2,644	2.42	▼3.3	0	0	0
LIVRE	1,579	1.44	▲0.4	0	0	0
Unitary Democratic Coalition	1,409	1.29	▼1.2	0	0	0
People's	1,155	1.06	▼1.9	0	0	0
Earth	610	0.56	▼0.3	0	0	0
Portuguese Workers' Communist	522	0.48	▼0.7	0	0	0
Volt Portugal	464	0.42	—N/a	—N/a	0	—N/a
React, Include, Recycle	389	0.36	▼0.1	0	0	0
Labour	377	0.34	▼0.2	0	0	0
We, the Citizens!	296	0.27	▼0.3	0	0	0
National Democratic Alternative	262	0.27	▼0.5	0	0	0
Socialist Alternative Movement	123	0.11	▼0.1	0	0	0
Alliance	84	0.08	▼0.4	0	0	0
Rise Up	78	0.07	▼0.7	0	0	0
Total valid	75,862	69.38	▼4.3	2	2	0
Blank ballots	711	0.65	▼0.9			
Invalid ballots	32,777	29.97	▲5.2			
Total	109,350	100.00				
Registered voters/turnout	926,376	11.80	▼0.2			
Source: Resultados Europa

==== Annulled vote ====
Summary of the 30 January 2022 Assembly of the Republic elections results in Europe
Parties	Votes	%	±pp swing	MPs		
Parties	Votes	%	±pp swing	2019	2022	±
Socialist	78,048	40.37	▲11.3	1	1	0
Social Democratic	49,063	25.38	▲6.6	1	1	0
Chega	19,225	9.94	▲9.0	0	0	0
Left Bloc	7,639	3.95	▼1.7	0	0	0
People–Animals–Nature	7,411	3.83	▼1.1	0	0	0
Liberal Initiative	4,989	2.58	▲1.8	0	0	0
Unitary Democratic Coalition	4,935	2.55	▲0.0	0	0	0
LIVRE	2,993	1.55	▲0.5	0	0	0
People's	2,580	1.33	▼1.6	0	0	0
Portuguese Workers' Communist	2,261	1.17	0.0	0	0	0
Earth	1,757	0.91	▼0.0	0	0	0
React, Include, Recycle	1,293	0.67	▲0.3	0	0	0
Labour	1,149	0.59	▼0.2	0	0	0
Volt Portugal	1,109	0.57	—N/a	—N/a	0	—N/a
We, the Citizens!	935	0.48	▼0.1	0	0	0
National Democratic Alternative	802	0.41	▼0.3	0	0	0
Socialist Alternative Movement	436	0.23	▲0.0	0	0	0
Alliance	307	0.16	▼0.3	0	0	0
Rise Up	281	0.15	▼0.6	0	0	0
Total valid	187,213	96.83	▲23.1	2	2	0
Blank ballots	2,764	1.43	▼0.1			
Invalid ballots	3,372	1.74	▼23.0			
Total	193,349	100.00				
Registered voters/turnout	926,376	20.87	▲8.8			
Source: Resultados Europa Anulados

=== Outside Europe ===
Summary of the 30 January 2022 Assembly of the Republic elections results in Outside Europe
Parties	Votes	%	±pp swing	MPs		
Parties	Votes	%	±pp swing	2019	2022	±
Social Democratic	24,143	37.46	▲4.1	1	1	0
Socialist	19,181	29.76	▲9.6	1	1	0
Chega	6,181	9.59	▲8.7	0	0	0
People–Animals–Nature	2,921	4.53	▼0.2	0	0	0
Liberal Initiative	2,285	3.55	▲1.0	0	0	0
Left Bloc	1,680	2.61	▼0.2	0	0	0
People's	1,381	2.14	▼2.2	0	0	0
Unitary Democratic Coalition	908	1.41	▲0.4	0	0	0
National Democratic Alternative	648	1.01	▼2.5	0	0	0
LIVRE	642	1.00	▲0.3	0	0	0
We, the Citizens!	621	0.96	▲0.1	0	0	0
Earth	532	0.83	▲0.2	0	0	0
Alliance	484	0.75	▼0.5	0	0	0
Volt Portugal	319	0.50	—N/a	—N/a	0	—N/a
React, Include, Recycle	287	0.45	▲0.1	0	0	0
Rise Up	199	0.31	▼1.8	0	0	0
Socialist Alternative Movement	72	0.11	—N/a	—N/a	0	—N/a
Total valid	62,484	96.96	▲15.0	2	2	0
Blank ballots	568	0.88	▲0.0			
Invalid ballots	1,390	2.16	▼15.0			
Total	64,442	100.00				
Registered voters/turnout	595,571	10.82	▲2.0			
Source: Resultados Fora da Europa
