= Swimming at the 2010 South American Games – Women's 100 metre freestyle =

The Women's 100m freestyle event at the 2010 South American Games was held on March 27, with the heats at 11:01 and the Final at 18:20.

== Medalists ==
Gold	Silver	Bronze
Arlene Semeco; Venezuela	Tatiana Barbosa; Brazil	Nadia Soledad Colovini; Argentina

== Records ==
Standing records prior to the 2010 South American Games
World record	Britta Steffen (GER)	52.07	Rome, Italy	31 July 2009
Competition Record	Arlene Semeco (VEN)	57.18	Buenos Aires, Argentina	16 November 2006
South American record	Tatiana Barbosa (BRA)	54.72	Rio de Janeiro, Brazil	18 December 2009

== Results ==
=== Heats ===
Rank	Heat	Lane	Athlete	Result	Notes
1	2	4	Arlene Semeco (VEN)	58.11	Q
2	1	4	Nadia Soledad Colovini (ARG)	58.16	Q
3	2	5	Aixa Jazmin Triay (ARG)	58.56	Q
4	1	5	Ximena Vilar (VEN)	59.33	Q
5	1	3	Chinyere Pigot (SUR)	59.41	Q
6	1	6	Maria Graciela Rosales (PER)	1:00.09	Q
7	3	4	Tatiana Barbosa (BRA)	1:00.18	Q
8	2	3	Carmen Maury (COL)	1:00.34	Q
9	3	3	Daynara de Paula (BRA)	1:00.38	
10	3	2	Raissa Andrea Guerra (URU)	1:00.65	
11	2	7	Chandel Domaso (SUR)	1:00.80	
12	3	5	Loren Yamile Cabello (ECU)	1:00.94	
13	3	7	Karen Milenka Guzman (BOL)	1:01.67	
14	3	6	María Clara Sosa (COL)	1:01.74	
15	3	1	Nilshaira Isenia (AHO)	1:02.14	
16	2	6	Ashley Bransford (ARU)	1:02.22	
17	2	1	Maria Jose Quintanilla (BOL)	1:02.62	
18	1	2	Massie Milagros Yong (PER)	1:02.82	
19	1	7	Maria Lopez Nery Huerta (PAR)	1:03.06	
20	2	2	Maria Sanchez (URU)	1:05.04	
21	1	1	Andrea Maria Ramirez (PAR)	1:06.09	
	2	8	Nicole Maria Gilbert (ECU)	DNS	
	3	8	Naomi Korstanje (AHO)	DNS	

=== Final ===
Rank	Lane	Athlete	Result	Notes
1st place, gold medalist(s)	4	Arlene Semeco (VEN)	56.21	CR
2nd place, silver medalist(s)	1	Tatiana Barbosa (BRA)	56.90	
3rd place, bronze medalist(s)	5	Nadia Soledad Colovini (ARG)	58.09	
4	3	Aixa Jazmin Triay (ARG)	58.16	
5	6	Ximena Vilar (VEN)	59.24	
6	8	Carmen Maury (COL)	59.58	
7	7	Maria Graciela Rosales (PER)	59.60	
8	2	Chinyere Pigot (SUR)	59.66	
