= Michelle Lenhardt =

Brazilian swimmer (born 1980)

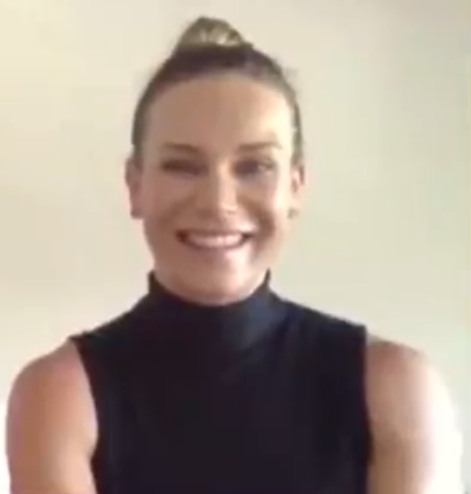
- In a 2021 interview

Personal information
- National team: Brazil
- Born: 27 May 1980 (age 46) Porto Alegre, Brazil
- Height: 1.77 m (5 ft 10 in)
- Weight: 74 kg (163 lb)

Sport
- Sport: Swimming
- Strokes: Freestyle
- Club: EC Pinheiros
Medal record
Women's swimming
Representing Brazil
Pan American Games
Silver medal – second place	2011 Guadalajara	4×100 m freestyle
Women's bodybuilding
Representing Brazil
WBFF World Championships
Gold medal – first place	Toronto 2016	Fitness +35

Michelle Lenhardt (born May 27, 1980 in Porto Alegre) is a Brazilian swimmer and bodybuilder, who specialized in freestyle events.

Graduated at Pontifícia Universidade Católica do Rio Grande do Sul with a degree in advertising, Lenhardt moved in 2004 to Santos city, where she began training in order to participate of the Olympics.

Nicknamed Mischa by friends, she was removed from the Brazilian team 2007 Pan American Games due to the federation's error that signed three athletes to compete in the relay instead of allowed two. However, she got the vacancy to 2008 Summer Olympics in Beijing thanks to Rebeca Gusmao having been cut, after she was ordered a doping suspension, becoming the first Rio Grande do Sul's female swimmer to compete at the Olympics.

Lenhardt represented Brazil at the 2008 Summer Olympics in Beijing, where she competed for the women's 4×100-metre freestyle relay, along with her fellow swimmers Flávia Cazziolato, Tatiana Barbosa, and Monique Ferreira. She swam on the third leg, with an individual-split time of 55.90 seconds, finishing last in the first heat and thirteenth overall to her team, for a total time of 3:42.85. She broke the South American record of the 4 × 100 m free.

On 6 September 2009, she broke again the South American record of the 4×100-metre freestyle, with a time of 3:41.49, along with Tatiana Lemos, Monique Ferreira and Julyana Kury

At the 2010 FINA World Swimming Championships (25 m), in Dubai, she was at the 4×100-metre freestyle final, finishing in 8th place. In this relay, she broke the short-course South American record, with a time of 3:35.95, along with Tatiana Lemos, Flavia Delaroli and Julyana Kury She also got the 26th place in the 50-metre freestyle.

At the 2011 World Aquatics Championships in Shanghai, obtained the 13th place in the 4×100-metre freestyle.

She won Brazil's fourth silver medal for the 4×100-metre freestyle relay team at the 2011 Pan American Games in Guadalajara, Mexico.

== Personal life ==
Lenhardt married fellow Brazilian swimmer Bruno Fratus in 2014 and now serves as one of his coaches.
