= Alessandra Marchioro =

Brazilian swimmer (born 1993)

Personal information
- Full name: Alessandra Christine Harrison Marchioro
- Nationality: Brazil
- Born: May 13, 1993 (age 33) Curitiba, Paraná, Brazil
- Height: 1.83 m (6 ft 0 in)
- Weight: 75 kg (165 lb)

Sport
- Sport: Swimming
- Strokes: Freestyle
Medal record
Women's swimming
Representing Brazil
World Championships (SC)
Bronze medal – third place	2014 Doha	4×50 m mixed free
South American Games
Gold medal – first place	2010 Medellín	4x100 m freestyle
Gold medal – first place	2014 Santiago	4x100 m freestyle
Silver medal – second place	2010 Medellín	50 m breaststroke
Silver medal – second place	2014 Santiago	50 m freestyle

Alessandra Christine Harrison Marchioro (born May 13, 1993) is a freestyle swimmer from Brazil.

At the 2010 South American Games in Medellín, Colombia, she won a gold medal in the 4×100-metre freestyle and a silver medal in the 50 metre breaststroke.

At the 2010 Summer Youth Olympics in Singapore, Marchioro was a finalist in five races and finished 4th place in the 50-metre freestyle. She came close to qualifying for the London Olympics 2012. Represented Brazil in the British Championship, which served as a test event for the Olympics. There, achieved the best life time in the 100-metre (56.15 seconds) and finished fourth in the 50-metre guests final.

At the 2012 FINA World Swimming Championships (25 m) in Istanbul, she finished 6th in the 4×100-metre freestyle final, 13th in the 100-metre freestyle semifinal, and 20th in the 50-metre freestyle.

She classified to swim at four proofs in the 2013 World Aquatics Championships in Barcelona. In the 4×100-metre freestyle, she broke the South American record, with a time of 3:41.05, along with Daynara de Paula, Graciele Herrmann and Larissa Oliveira. The Brazilian team finished in 11th place, and did not advance to the final. She also finished 24th in the 50-metre freestyle., and 32nd in the 100-metre freestyle.

At the 2014 South American Games in Santiago, Chile, she won a gold medal in the 4×100-metre freestyle and a silver medal in the 50 metre freestyle.

At the 2014 Pan Pacific Swimming Championships in Gold Coast, Queensland, she finished 5th in the 4x100-metre freestyle relay, along with Graciele Herrmann, Etiene Medeiros and Daynara de Paula, and 11th in the 50-metre freestyle.

At the 2014 FINA World Swimming Championships (25 m) in Doha, Qatar, Marchioro won a bronze medal in the 4 × 50 metre mixed freestyle relay, by participating at heats. Marchioro also finished 7th in the Women's 4 × 100 metre freestyle relay (3:33.93, South American record), and 8th in the Women's 4 × 50 metre freestyle relay (1:38.78, South American record), both relays formed by Marchioro, Daiane Oliveira, Larissa Oliveira and Daynara de Paula; and finished 21st in the Women's 100 metre freestyle. Marchioro also swam the heats of the Women's 4 × 50 metre medley relay, with a time of 1:47.20, South American record.
