= Julyana Kury =

Brazilian swimmer (born 1983)

Personal information
- Full name: Julyana Kury
- Nationality: Brazil
- Born: June 16, 1983 (age 43) São Paulo, São Paulo, Brazil
- Height: 1.79 m (5 ft 10 in)
- Weight: 71 kg (157 lb)

Sport
- Sport: Swimming
- Strokes: Freestyle

Julyana Kury (born June 16, 1983 in São Paulo) is a Brazilian national delegate competitive swimmer, who joined the Brazilian national delegation in the 2008 Summer Olympics, recently held in Beijing, China, as a reserve/backup swimmer.

Kury served two years of suspension due to a doping, losing the chance to swim the 2004 Summer Olympics in Athens. She won a gold medal in the 4×100-metre freestyle relay and bronze medals in the 50-metre freestyle and 200-metre backstroke at the 2008 South American Championship. She won a bronze medal in the 100-metre individual medley at the 2007 World Cup in Belo Horizonte.

On 6 September 2009, she broke the South American record in the 4×100-metre freestyle (Olympic pool), with a time of 3:41.49, along with Tatiana Lemos, Monique Ferreira and Michelle Lenhardt

She was at the 2010 Pan Pacific Swimming Championships in Irvine, where she finished 17th in the 50-metre backstroke, 15th in the 50-metre freestyle and 41st in the 100-metre freestyle.

In World Military Games, conducted in 2010 at Warendorf, Germany, she won the gold medal in the 4×100-metre freestyle.

At the 2010 FINA World Swimming Championships (25 m), in Dubai, she was at the 4×100-metre freestyle final, finishing in 8th place. In this relay, she broke the short-course South American record, with a time of 3:35,95, along with Tatiana Lemos, Flavia Delaroli and Michelle Lenhardt
