= Swimming at the 2010 South American Games – Women's 100 metre butterfly =

The Women's 100m butterfly event at the 2010 South American Games was held on March 26, with the heats at 10:49 and the Final at 18:32.

== Medalists ==
Gold	Silver	Bronze
Daynara de Paula; Brazil	Carolina Colorado Henao; Colombia	Daiene Dias; Brazil

== Records ==
Standing records prior to the 2010 South American Games
World record	Sarah Sjöström (SWE)	56.06	Rome, Italy	27 July 2009
Competition Record	Gabriella Silva (BRA)	1:01.54	Buenos Aires, Argentina	15 November 2006
South American record	Gabriella Silva (BRA)	56.94	Rome, Italy	27 July 2009

== Results ==
=== Heats ===
Rank	Heat	Lane	Athlete	Result	Notes
1	3	4	Daynara de Paula (BRA)	1:01.11	Q CR
2	1	4	Carolina Colorado Henao (COL)	1:01.34	Q
3	2	4	Daiene Dias (BRA)	1:02.75	Q
4	3	5	Elimar Barrios (VEN)	1:03.32	Q
5	1	5	Eliana Barrios (VEN)	1:03.72	Q
6	3	3	María Clara Sosa (COL)	1:03.87	Q
7	2	5	Loren Yamile Cabello (ECU)	1:04.02	Q
8	2	3	Manuela Morano (ARG)	1:04.75	Q
9	1	3	Karen Nicole Antonini (ARG)	1:05.81	
10	3	6	Ximena Elisabeth Espinol (ECU)	1:06.49	
11	2	6	Maria Graciela Rosales (PER)	1:06.91	
12	1	6	Daniela Reyes (CHI)	1:07.86	
13	3	2	Karen Milenka Guzman (BOL)	1:08.55	
14	2	2	Carolina Alejandra Muro (PER)	1:10.03	
	1	2	Josefina Meneses (CHI)	DNS	
	2	7	Naomi Korstanje (AHO)	DNS	

=== Final ===
Rank	Lane	Athlete	Result	Notes
1st place, gold medalist(s)	4	Daynara de Paula (BRA)	1:00.44	CR
2nd place, silver medalist(s)	5	Carolina Colorado Henao (COL)	1:01.21	
3rd place, bronze medalist(s)	3	Daiene Dias (BRA)	1:02.27	
4	6	Elimar Barrios (VEN)	1:02.77	
5	2	Eliana Barrios (VEN)	1:03.27	
6	1	Loren Yamile Cabello (ECU)	1:03.81	
7	7	María Clara Sosa (COL)	1:04.37	
8	8	Manuela Morano (ARG)	1:04.91	
