= Duarte Costa =

Portuguese climate expert and politician

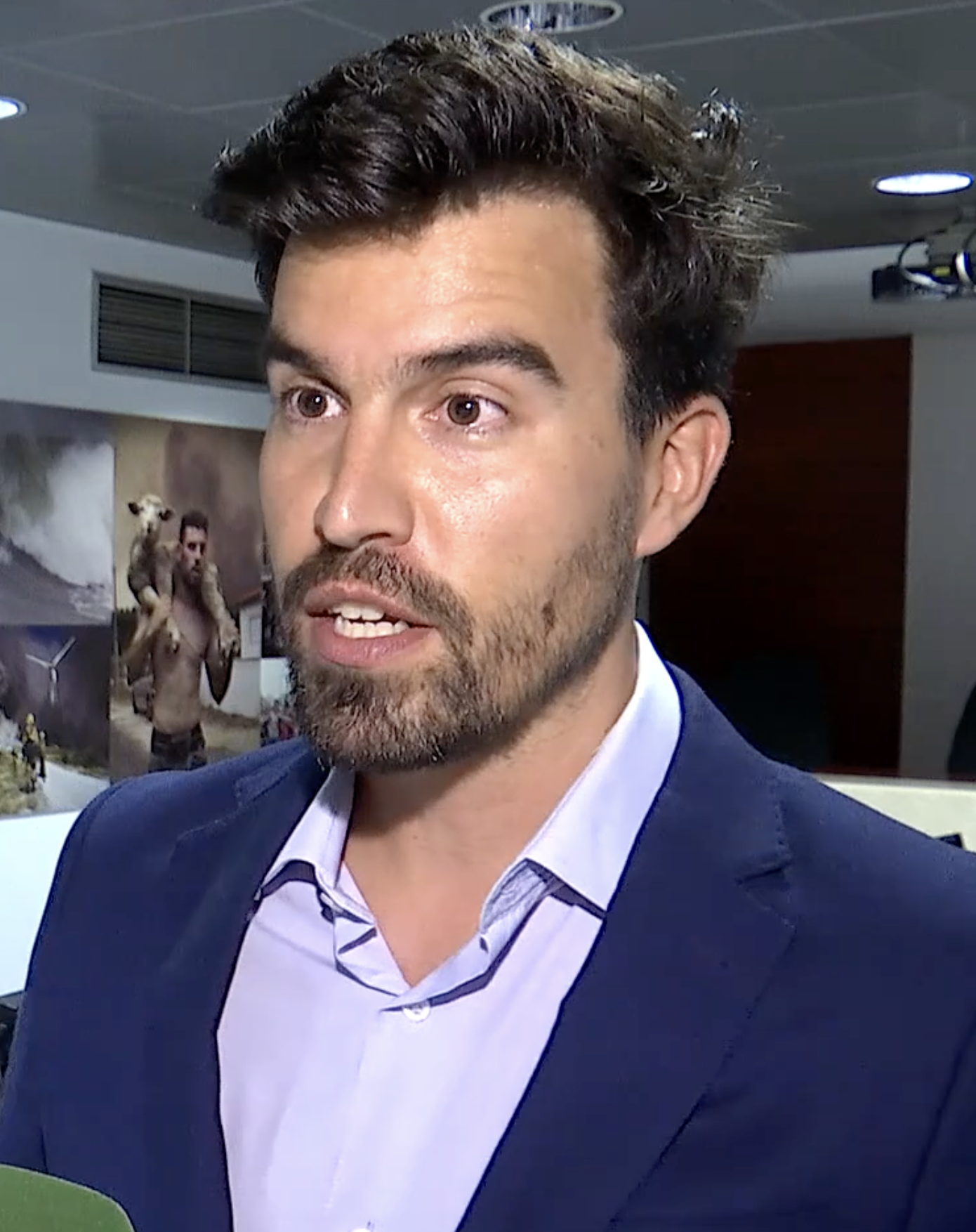
- Costa in 2025

Co-President of Volt Portugal
- Incumbent
- Assumed office 26 June 2022

Personal details
- Born: 22 June 1988 (age 38) Lisbon
- Party: Volt Portugal
- Education: bachelor's degree in geography master's degree in Climate Change and Policy
- Alma mater: University of Lisbon; University of Sussex

Duarte Costa (born 22 June 1988) is a Portuguese politician and co-chair of the party Volt Portugal, as well as a climate expert. Costa is his party's top candidate for the 2024 European elections.

== Career ==
Duarte Costa was born in Lisbon in 1988 and studied geography at the University of Lisbon from 2006 to 2009. Costa graduated from the University of Sussex with a Master's degree in Climate Change and Policy. Convinced that science should have a stronger influence on political decisions, he joined the party Volt. Costa was the top candidate for the European constituency in the 2022 Portuguese legislative elections. In June 2022, Costa together with Ana Carvalho were elected Co-Chairs of Volt Portugal. In the list election for the 2024 European Parliament election, he was nominated as the top candidate of the list together with Rhia Lopes.

== Political positions ==
=== Transport policy ===
Costa repeatedly spoke out in favour of expanding public transport and sustainable transport infrastructure more quickly in order to support Portugal's climate protection efforts. For example, he advocated limiting fuel rebates to vulnerable groups at the start of the Russian invasion of Ukraine in order to use the funds thus freed up to support the expansion of carbon-neutral mobility systems. Costa wants to significantly expand the rail network and link Portugal more closely with Spain and the rest of Europe with high-speed railway lines. Urban planning should include links with public transport from the outset, and housing construction should be geared towards this, following the example of Vienna.

=== Climate protection ===
To be in line with the IPCC report's requirements for climate action, Costa called for more ambitious measures and advocated for the EU to aim for carbon neutrality by 2040 instead of 2050, and to reduce emissions by 80% by 2030 instead of 55% as predicted. Urban planning should also be adapted to changing conditions due to climate change, with increasing heat waves and forest fires, and the energy efficiency of houses should be increased. To this end, more climate-friendly forms of mobility are to be promoted.

=== Equality and LGBTQ rights ===
Duarte Costa has repeatedly spoken out against racism, homophobia, misogyny and transphobia and regularly participates in Christopher Street Days.

=== European policy ===
By introducing transnational lists in European elections, Costa wants to deepen European democracy and bring citizens closer to the EU.

In order to make the EU more capable of acting, Costa also spoke out in favour of abolishing the right of veto in the European Council and proposes decision-making by qualified majority instead. In the future, the European Union should become a parliamentary democracy with a government elected by the EU Parliament.

== Storm Charles ==
On Tuesday, 10 November 2026, after the Portuguese government declared a state of alert due to the passage of Storm Charles, which was forecast to reach Portugal the following day, Duarte Costa stated on the Portuguese television channel SIC Notícias: "On Thursday, we will have a devastated country; this needs to be said clearly. There is no way a storm of this magnitude can pass through our country without causing major destruction." His remarks were based on the possibility of wind gusts reaching around 150 km/h. However, the forecast did not materialise, and no serious damage or fatalities were reported.
