= Swimming at the 2013 World Aquatics Championships – Women's 4 × 100 metre freestyle relay =

Women's 4 × 100 metre freestyle relay at the 2013 World Aquatics Championships
- Venue: Palau Sant Jordi
- Dates: July 28, 2013 (heats & final)
- Competitors: 60 from 15 nations
- Winning time: 3:32.31 AM

Medalists
gold medal	Missy Franklin; Natalie Coughlin; Shannon Vreeland; Megan Romano	United States
silver medal	Cate Campbell; Bronte Campbell; Emma McKeon; Alicia Coutts	Australia
bronze medal	Elise Bouwens; Femke Heemskerk; Inge Dekker; Ranomi Kromowidjojo	Netherlands

Barcelona Palau San Jordi

The women's 4 × 100 metre freestyle relay event in swimming at the 2013 World Aquatics Championships took place on 28 July at the Palau Sant Jordi in Barcelona, Spain.

== Records ==
Prior to this competition, the existing world and championship records were:

World record	Netherlands (NED); Inge Dekker (53.61); Ranomi Kromowidjojo (52.30); Femke Heemskerk (53.03); Marleen Veldhuis (52.78)	3:31.72	Rome, Italy	26 July 2009
Competition record	Netherlands (NED); Inge Dekker (53.61); Ranomi Kromowidjojo (52.30); Femke Heemskerk (53.03); Marleen Veldhuis (52.78)	3:31.72	Rome, Italy	26 July 2009

== Results ==
=== Heats ===
The heats were held at 12:10.

Rank	Heat	Lane	Name	Nationality	Time	Notes
1	2	5	Simone Manuel (54.23); Natalie Coughlin (54.09); Elizabeth Pelton (54.66); Megan Romano (53.24)	United States	3:36.22	Q
2	2	4	Bronte Campbell (54.57); Emma McKeon (53.71); Brittany Elmslie (53.97); Emily Seebohm (54.21)	Australia	3:36.46	Q
3	1	6	Victoria Poon (54.56); Sandrine Mainville (54.04); Chantal van Landeghem (53.93); Samantha Cheverton (55.50)	Canada	3:38.03	Q, NR
4	1	3	Michelle Coleman (54.50); Louise Hansson (55.08); Sarah Sjöström (53.13); Nathalie Lindborg (55.36)	Sweden	3:38.07	Q
5	2	6	Veronika Popova (54.58); Victoria Andreeva (54.74); Mariya Baklakova (54.27); Margarita Nesterova (54.73)	Russia	3:38.32	Q
6	1	4	Inge Dekker (54.91); Femke Heemskerk (53.64); Esmee Vermeulen (55.22); Elise Bouwens (54.64)	Netherlands	3:38.41	Q
7	1	2	Dorothea Brandt (55.36); Britta Steffen (53.63); Daniela Schreiber (54.95); Alexandra Wenk (55.25)	Germany	3:39.19	Q
8	2	3	Haruka Ueda (55.39); Misaki Yamaguchi (54.51); Miki Uchida (54.85); Yayoi Matsumoto (54.49)	Japan	3:39.24	Q
9	1	5	Qiu Yuhan (54.93); Pang Jiaying (54.93); Wang Haibing (54.99); Chen Xinyi (54.44)	China	3:39.29	
10	2	2	Alice Mizzau (55.57); Federica Pellegrini (53.98); Silvia di Pietro (55.12); Erika Ferraioli (54.83)	Italy	3:39.50	NR
11	2	1	Larissa Oliveira (55.29); Daynara de Paula (55.36); Graciele Herrmann (55.23); Alessandra Marchioro (55.17)	Brazil	3:41.05	SA
12	1	7	Marta Gonzaléz (56.39); Patricia Castro (55.34); Beatriz Gómez Cortés (55.99); Melanie Costa (54.36)	Spain	3:42.08	NR
13	2	8	Ingvild Snildal (56.17); Susann Bjornsen (55.99); Monica Johannessen (56.43); Henriette Brekke (56.42)	Norway	3:45.01	
14	2	7	Quah Ting Wen (56.81); Amanda Lim (57.02); Mylene Ong (57.92); Lynette Lim (57.10)	Singapore	3:48.85	
15	1	8	Hwang Seo-Jin (57.18); Kim Go-Eun (59.66); Han Na-Kyeong (58.92); An Se-Hyeon (59.91)	South Korea	3:55.67	
	1	1		Mexico		DNS

=== Final ===
The final was held at 19:17.

Rank	Lane	Nation	Swimmers	Time	Notes
1st place, gold medalist(s)	4	Missy Franklin (53.51); Natalie Coughlin (52.98); Shannon Vreeland (53.22); Megan Romano (52.60)	United States	3:32.31	AM
2nd place, silver medalist(s)	5	Cate Campbell (52.33) OC; Bronte Campbell (53.47); Emma McKeon (53.19); Alicia Coutts (53.44)	Australia	3:32.43	OC
3rd place, bronze medalist(s)	7	Elise Bouwens (55.68); Femke Heemskerk (52.86); Inge Dekker (54.58); Ranomi Kromowidjojo (52.65)	Netherlands	3:35.77	
4	6	Michelle Coleman (53.91); Louise Hansson (54.27); Sarah Sjöström (52.95); Nathalie Lindborg (55.43)	Sweden	3:36.56	
5	3	Victoria Poon (54.65); Sandrine Mainville (54.00); Chantal van Landeghem (53.57); Samantha Cheverton (54.87)	Canada	3:37.09	NR
6	2	Veronika Popova (55.11); Victoria Andreeva (54.62); Mariya Baklakova (54.42); Margarita Nesterova (54.30)	Russia	3:38.45	
7	8	Haruka Ueda (55.68); Misaki Yamaguchi (54.57); Miki Uchida (54.65); Yayoi Matsumoto (54.55)	Japan	3:39.45	
8	1	Dorothea Brandt (55.63); Britta Steffen (53.59); Alexandra Wenk (55.49); Daniela Schreiber (54.86)	Germany	3:39.57	
