= Volt Portugal =

Political party in Portugal

- Abbreviation: Volt
- Leader: Catarina Silva Marques, Pedro Pessoa
- General Secretary: Miguel Torres
- Founded: 25 June 2020; 6 years ago
- Headquarters: Lisbon
- Ideology: European federalism; Pro-Europeanism; Progressivism; Social liberalism
- Political position: Centre to centre-left
- European political alliance: Volt Europa
- Colors: Purple
- Assembly of the Republic: 0 / 230
- European Parliament: 0 / 21

Website
- Official website

National sections of Volt Europa. The borders of the European Union are shown in red.

Volt Portugal is a eurofederalist political party in Portugal. It is affiliated with Volt Europa and was officially registered in June 2020 as the 25th party in the country. Volt since has contested several local and national parliamentary elections.

== Policies ==
After the founding of the parent organisation, Volt Europe, the "5+1 Challenges" were adopted, which define the fundamental challenges that the party sees. This was followed by the European policy document Mapping of Policies, which forms the basis for the creation of all of Volt's programmes.

Since then, several documents have been added to the Mapping of Policies. Together with the Mapping of Policies, these thematically limited documents form the so-called Policy Portfolio, from which all national, regional and local programmes are derived.

On 18 December 2021, the party presented an election manifesto for national parliamentary elections for the first time.

=== Program ===
In its program for the 2022 general election, Volt proposes electoral reform, the creation of administrative regions in Portugal to put more focus on the development of Portugal's interior, which the party says has been forgotten, and to hold a referendum on this.

==== Social policy and culture ====
The party advocates equality in parental leave and free Child care and kindergartens. Investment in better training for police forces should be increased, ethnic profiling and police violence should be ended.

Volt wants to improve culture and access for young people by introducing and awarding culture vouchers worth €200. Jewish life in Portugal and the Sephardic community should be supported and the application process for Portuguese citizenship of the Diaspora should be made more transparent.

Public housing should be promoted and the proportion in cities should be increased to at least 10%. The party also proposes programmes for multi-generational housing. Volt also wants the introduction of an unconditional basic income (UBI) to be examined.

The party is in favour of the rights of the LGBTQ community and equality. The party is against discrimination based on gender, sexual orientation, religion and origin.

==== Climate policy ====
Volt sees climate protection as one of the most urgent challenges and wants to work towards the goal of decarbonising the energy supply in Portugal and the EU by 2035 and achieving carbon neutrality for the whole of Portugal by 2040. In order to combat climate change, Volt advocates the abolition of subsidies for fossil fuels and the inclusion of nuclear power in the European Union's green taxonomy. Volt also sees the expansion of rail infrastructure and combating desertification in Portugal as an important element of climate policy in this context. In addition, investments will be made in the energy efficiency of houses to combat climate change and increase the safety of people in situations with extreme temperatures. Subsidies for fossil fuels should be reduced and the financial resources freed up should be invested in the expansion of the public transport sector and a carbon-neutral mobility system.

==== Digital policy ====
A ministry for digitalisation is to be created to bundle expertise at state level. This is intended not only to promote the restructuring of the state apparatus, but also to combat fake news and cybercrime and help to reduce bureaucracy. By modernising and integrating information systems and thus reducing the level of bureaucracy through digitalisation, the state apparatus would be able to operate with higher levels of efficiency and lower costs for taxpayers.

==== Economic and fiscal policy ====
The party supports a reduction in corporate tax for companies that pay high wages and the introduction of new taxes, especially on unhealthy foods and medicines without scientifically proven benefits. Labour law is to be harmonised with that of the European Union and a whistleblower system to combat corruption is to be established. Unemployment benefits are to be extended and incentives for remote work are to be provided.

Volt aims to promote regional industrial clusters by fostering dialogue between entrepreneurs, universities, trade unions and public institutions.

==== Electoral reform ====
In response to the problems in the 2022 parliamentary election, Volt called for a reform of postal voting and proposes the testing and introduction of digital voting, as is already possible in Belgium, Estonia and France. The aim is to avoid frequent mistakes in postal voting that lead to invalid votes and to speed up the counting process, as well as to reduce the costs of the election. In addition, the hurdles to participation in the election are to be lowered.

==== Security policy ====
Volt strives for a common EU defence policy and a common European army. The party is convinced that national parties are no longer capable of ensuring security within Europe.

The basis for this should be a phased integration and closer cooperation of national European armed forces. The cooperation between Germany and the Netherlands, which culminated in the integration of the Dutch army into the German army, is proposed as a model for this.

==== Transport policy ====
Local public transport is to be expanded and improved in terms of frequency, comfort and journey times to make it competitive with cars. The rail network in Portugal is also to be expanded and Portugal's high-speed lines linked more closely with Spain and the rest of Europe. Cycle paths are to be promoted. Overall, the party's aim in the transport sector is to improve the networking of transport infrastructure and reduce dependence on car traffic.

==== Health policy ====
In the area of health care, the party advocates the reduction of waiting lists and criticises the state of the National Health Service, low salaries and the slipping to minimum wage levels of employees and lack of rest days despite high workloads.

The party advocates the legalization of prostitution, soft drug trafficking, passive euthanasia, and assisted suicide. Altruistic surrogacy arrangements are also to be legalised, and the extent to which the black market can be combated by legalising surrogacy arrangements of a commercial nature is to be investigated. In view of the ageing population, the party proposes expanding the national health service.

== Elections ==
=== Local elections 2021 ===
In the 2021 Portuguese local elections, the party contested in Lisbon (0.58%), Porto (0.42%), Tomar (1.36%), Coimbra (coalition 43.92%) and Oeiras (coalition 7.57%), winning one mandate in Coimbra. Independent MEP Francisco Guerreiro supported the party in the local elections.

=== Parliamentary election 2022 ===
In the 2022 Portuguese legislative election, Volt Portugal contested a national election for the first time, being eligible in 19 out of 22 districts. The campaign's slogan is "Volt és tu" (Volt is you). The party's goal is to achieve the most votes of the parties not previously represented in parliament and two mandates. The party earned 0.1% of the vote and no seats. The party achieved its best result in the constituency of European foreign countries. After 80.32% of the ballots in the European constituency were declared invalid and a complaint by Volt to the Constitutional Court, the Court declared the election in the constituency invalid and ordered a rerun.

=== Parliamentary election 2024 ===
In November 2023, Volt proposed to the PAN, LIVRE and IL parties that they form a joint progressive alliance to fight populism in the 2024 early parliamentary elections. However, the initiative was not taken up. In December 2023, the party then elected its list for the 2024 parliamentary elections, with Inês Bravo Figueiredo and Luís Almeida Fernandes as the lead candidates. The campaign's slogan is "Volt, Paixão pelo bom senso" (Volt, Passion for common sense) and the party emphasises the importance of taking action against increasing extremism and populism in Portuguese politics. On 13 January, the party presented its programme, in which it presents solutions for the expansion of public transport, climate protection, the expansion of social housing and health policy in particular.

The party was running in 21 out of 22 constituencies.

In an interview with the news agency Lusa in February 2024, the lead candidate Inês Bravo Figueiredo declared that she is willing to support a possible parliamentary majority on both the left and the right, but ruled out any collaboration with right-wing populist parties such as Chega or the communist PCP and all anti-European parties.

=== European Election 2024 ===
In May 2023, Volt elected its list for the 2024 European election, with Duarte Costa and Rhia Lopes as list leaders. In October 2023, the party elected a further 19 candidates, bringing the full list to 21. The party received 0.24%.

=== Parliamentary election and Local elections 2025 ===
At the parliamentary election the Volt participated in 20 out of 22 constituencies. Lead candidates was the two party co-presidents Duarte Costa and Inês Bravo Figueiredo. Volt received 0.19%.

The party participated in the local elections in Tomar, Lisbon, Porto, Castêlo da Maia, Vila Nova de Gaia, Loulé, Odivelas and supported joint lists in Rio Maior, Sintra, Torres Vedras, Oeiras and Évora. The party ended up winning one city councillor in Torres Vedras, Rui Estrela, and winning one Municipal Assembly member in Rio Maior.

=== Presidential election 2026 ===
In the 2026 presidential election, Volt initially supported Manuela Magno, a member of the party who had been a failed candidate in the 2006 presidential election. Although, she ended up not gathering enough signatures to be a candidate.

In early January 2026, the party supported António José Seguro, from the Socialist Party. Seguro ended up winning the first round with 31.1% of the votes, and the second round with 66.8% of the votes, being elected President.

== History ==
Volt has been present in Portugal since December 2017 and, like other national offshoots of Volt Europe in Portugal, initially planned to participate in the European elections, but failed to obtain the required 7500 supporter signatures. On 9 October 2019, the movement then submitted over 9000 signatures to be officially recognised as a party in Portugal. After several delays and amendments to the constitution required by the Constitutional Court, the Constitutional Court finally made the decision to officially recognise Volt Portugal as a party on 25 June 2020. This makes Volt the 25th party in the country and 14th registered section of Volt Europa recognised as a national party.

Due to the delays, the party was not able to contest the Azores elections in autumn 2020, contrary to what was initially promised.

In the September 2021 local elections, the party contested an election for the first time in its history, winning a mandate in Coimbra. Independent MEP Francisco Guerreiro supported the party in the local elections. At Volt Europa's general assembly in October 2021, Volt and Guerreiro announced that the currently independent MEP would join the party after his mandate expired. In January 2022, the party contested national parliamentary elections for the first time. It achieved 0.1% and fell one mandate short.

In May 2022, the founder and first president of Volt Portugal, Tiago Matos Gomes, resigned and left the party. The reason he gave was ideological differences with other members. Volt's National Council President Miguel Duarte took over as interim president.

On 25 and 26 June 2022, the 2nd National Congress of Volt Portugal was held in Setúbal, where the new internal organs of the party were elected. Ana Carvalho and Duarte Costa were elected President and Vice-President, respectively, to lead the National Political Commission. At its 3rd National Congress on 21 January 2023, the party decided to include in its statutes a model of joint leadership by two persons of different sexes as party leaders, which it had already been following since the previous Congress, making it the first party in Portugal to introduce such a model. However, the decision still has to be confirmed by the Constitutional Court.

In 2026, MP Filipe Sousa met with Volt's MEPs, in order to discuss a partnership between Volt Portugal and the Madeira-based party Together for the People.

== Election results ==
=== Assembly of the Republic ===
Election	Leader	Votes	%	Seats	+/–	Government
2022	Tiago Matos Gomes	6,240	0.1 (#17)	0 / 230	New	No seats
2024	Ana Carvalho; Duarte Costa	11,854	0.2 (#15)	0 / 230	0	No seats
2025	Ana Carvalho; Duarte Costa	12,150	0.2 (#12)	0 / 230	0	No seats

=== European Parliament ===
Election	List leader	Votes	%	Seats	+/–	EP Group
2024	Duarte Costa	9,572	0.2 (#10)	0 / 21	New	–
