= Ana Carvalho =

Portuguese engineer and politician

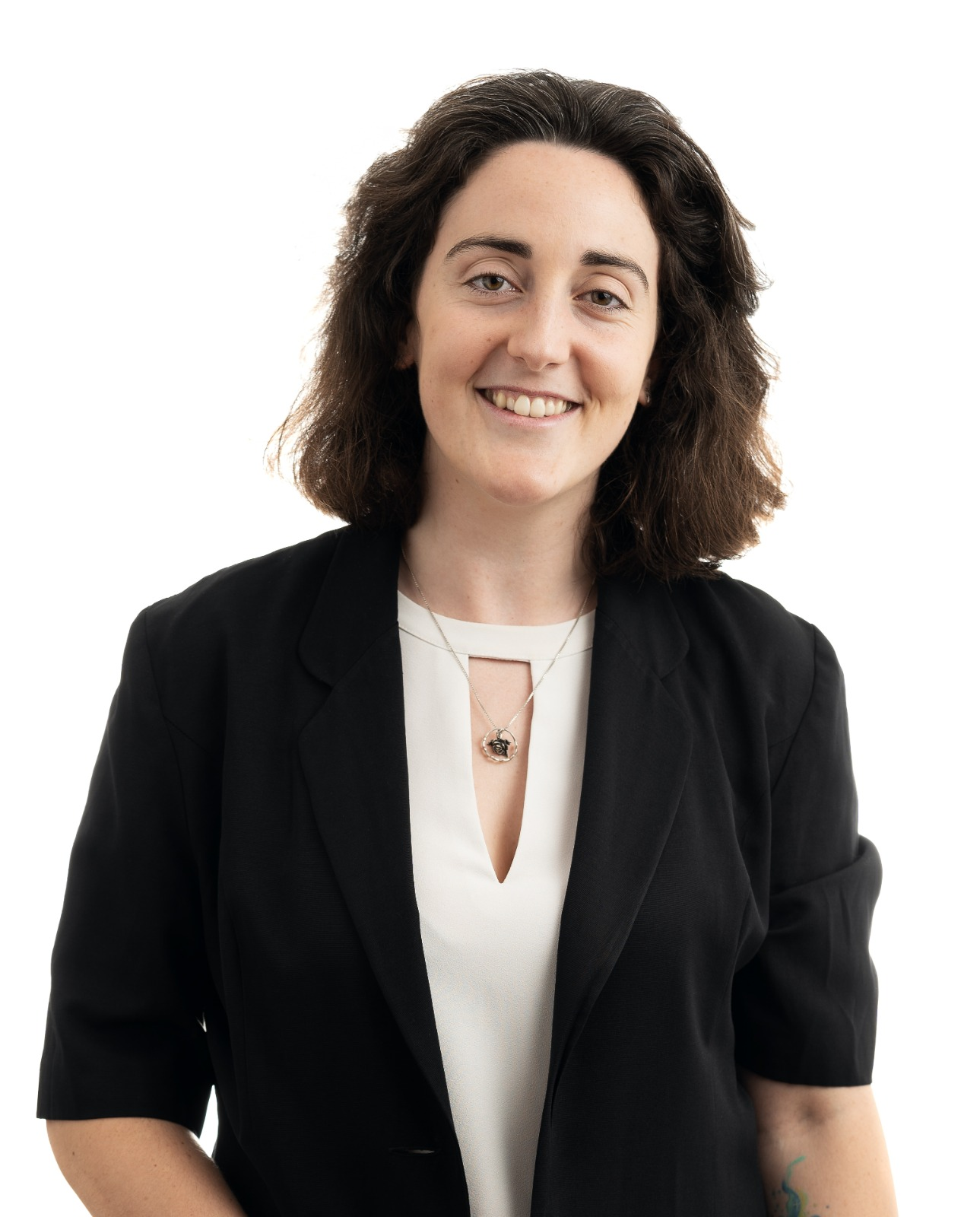
- Carvalho in 2023
- Born: Ana Patricia Simões Gonçalves de Carvalho; 1996 (age 29–30)
- Education: Instituto Superior Técnico; Karlsruhe Institute of Technology
- Occupations: Politician, Engineer

Ana Patricia Simões Gonçalves de Carvalho (born 1996) is a Portuguese politician and engineer. Together with Duarte Costa, she was co-chair of the party Volt Portugal.

== Career ==
Carvalho studied electrical and computer engineering at the Instituto Superior Técnico and the Karlsruhe Institute of Technology and has since worked as an engineer in the field of renewable energies. During her studies in Germany, she joined the Volt Europa party and movement in 2019. From September 2020 to June 2022, she was Secretary General of Volt Portugal. In the 2022 parliamentary elections, she was the second candidate on the list for Lisbon. At Volt Portugal's second party congress on 27 June 2022, Carvalho was elected co-chair of the party together with Duarte Costa. Since then, both have led the party as dual leaders. As the model of joint leadership was officially adopted into the party's statutes at the third party congress in January 2023, Volt is now the first party in Portugal with shared party leadership.

== Political positions ==
=== Social policy ===
In a guest article in 2023, Carvalho criticised the fact that many young people are unable to afford housing in cities and are therefore forced to live with their parents or outside for long periods of time. As a solution, she proposes the promotion of more social housing and multi-generational housing, as has already been trialled in Germany, among other countries.

She campaigns against discrimination against the LGBTQIA+ community and in favour of structural reform in the European Union in order to be able to take action against member states in the event of human rights violations.

=== Health policy ===
Based on her own experience during her studies, Carvalho is committed to removing the taboo surrounding mental health. She wants to see inequalities in access to mental health care reduced and a broader range of information on the topic made available.

== Personal life ==
Carvalho is bisexual.
