= Tatiana Lemos =

Brazilian swimmer (born 1978)

Personal information
- Full name: Tatiana Martine Lemos de Lima Barbosa
- Born: December 10, 1978 (age 47) Brasília, DF, Brazil
- Height: 1.68 m (5 ft 6 in)
- Weight: 63 kg (139 lb)

Sport
- Sport: Swimming
- Strokes: Freestyle
Medal record
Women's swimming
Representing Brazil
Pan American Games
Silver medal – second place	2011 Guadalajara	4x100 m freestyle
Silver medal – second place	2011 Guadalajara	4x200 m freestyle
Bronze medal – third place	1999 Winnipeg	4x100 m freestyle
Bronze medal – third place	1999 Winnipeg	4×200 m freestyle
Bronze medal – third place	2003 Sto. Domingo	4x100 m freestyle
Bronze medal – third place	2007 Rio	4×200 m freestyle
Bronze medal – third place	2011 Guadalajara	4x100 m medley

Tatiana Martine Lemos de Lima Barbosa (born December 10, 1978) is a freestyle swimmer from Brazil.

In her career, she represented Minas Brasília, COPM de Brasília, Iate Clube de Brasília, AABB de Brasília, Clube do Exército de Brasília, CR Vasco da Gama, Esporte Clube Pinheiros and Unisanta. She has been in two Olympic Games, four World Championships (Long Course), five World Championships (Short Course), four editions of the Pan American Games, and two editions of the Swimming World Military Championships.

== International career ==
She was at the 1998 World Aquatics Championships, in Perth, where she finished 10th in the 4×200-metre freestyle, 13th in the 4×100-metre freestyle, and 41st in the 100-metre freestyle.

She participated at the 1999 FINA World Swimming Championships (25 m), in Hong Kong.

Tatiana had a great debut in his first Pan, the 1999 Pan American Games in Winnipeg, with three bronze medals in three relays (4×100-metre freestyle, 4×200-metre freestyle and 4×100-metre medley). She also finished 5th in the 100-metre freestyle, and 6th in the 50-metre freestyle.

Participated in the 2000 FINA World Swimming Championships (25 m) in Athens, where she finished 22nd in the 50-metre freestyle, 25th in the 100-metre freestyle, 9th in the 4×100-metre freestyle, and 9th in the 4×200-metre freestyle.

She was at the 2002 FINA World Swimming Championships (25 m) in Moscow, reaching the 4×100-metre freestyle final, being in 8th place. Also ranked 9th in the 4×200-metre freestyle.

At the 2003 Pan American Games, in Santo Domingo, she won another bronze in the 4×100-metre freestyle.

At the 2003 World Aquatics Championships in Barcelona, finished 14th in the 4×100-metre freestyle.

Tatiana also entered the 4×100-metre freestyle relay in 2004 Summer Olympics, in Athens. She was the second to jump into the pool on August 14 that year. The team, which had yet Renata Burgos, Rebeca Gusmão and Flávia Delaroli, took 12th place in Olympic dispute. Tatiana was also in 19th place in the 100-metre freestyle.

Participating in the 2004 FINA World Swimming Championships (25 m), in Indianapolis, Tatiana almost gets an historical medal, finishing in 4th place in the 4×100-metre freestyle. She also gets 6th place in the 4×200-metre freestyle.

At the 2007 Pan American Games, in Rio de Janeiro, Tatiana won the bronze in the 4×200-metre freestyle, along with Monique Ferreira, Manuella Lyrio and Paula Baracho. She also won the silver medal in the 4×100-metre freestyle, along with Flávia Delaroli, Monique Ferreira and Rebeca Gusmão However, later this medal was revoked due to Rebeca Gusmão's doping.

In May 2008, together with Flávia Delaroli, Monique Ferreira and Michelle Lenhardt, got new South American record of the 4×100-metre freestyle relay with a time of 3:43.16. The swimmer was almost out of the group that went to the Olympics. Her vacancy came only with the exclusion of Julyana Kury, caught in an doping exam.

Participating in 2008 Summer Olympics in Beijing, China, Tatiana finished 10th in the 4×100-metre medley, and 13th in the 4×100-metre freestyle.

At the 2009 World Aquatics Championships in Rome, Tatiana ranked 29th in the 50-metre freestyle, 22nd in the 100-metre freestyle, and was in the 4×100-metre medley final, finishing in 8th place.

She was at the 2010 Pan Pacific Swimming Championships in Irvine, where she finished 6th in the 4×200-metre freestyle, 16th in the 50-metre freestyle, 21st in the 100-metre freestyle, and 23rd in the 200-metre freestyle.

In the Military World Games, conducted in 2010 in Warendorf, Germany, she won the gold medal in the 100-metre freestyle and the 4×100-metre freestyle, and silver in the 50-metre freestyle, 200-metre freestyle and 4×100-metre medley.

Participating in the 2010 FINA World Swimming Championships (25 m), in Dubai, came in 19th place in the 100-metre freestyle, 28th in the 200-metre freestyle was in the 4×100-metre freestyle final, finishing 8th and in the 4×100-metre medley, also finished 8th .

At the 2011 World Aquatics Championships in Shanghai, Tatiana got the 25th place in the 100-metre freestyle, 13th in the 4×100-metre freestyle, and 17th in the 4×100-metre medley.

At the 2011 Pan American Games in Guadalajara, Tatiana won silver in the 4×100-metre freestyle, in the 4×200-metre freestyle, and bronze in the 4×100-metre medley.

At the 2012 FINA World Swimming Championships (25 m), in Istanbul, she reached the 4×100-metre freestyle final, placing 6th.

She ended her career in late 2013, at the Open tournament, held in Porto Alegre, Brazil.

== Records ==
Tatiana is the current holder of the following records:

Long course (50 meters):

- Former South American record holder of the 100m freestyle: 54.72, time obtained on December 18, 2009
- Former South American record holder of the 4x100 freestyle: 3:41.49, time obtained on September 6, 2009, along with Michelle Lenhardt, Monique Ferreira and Julyana Kury
- South American record holder of the 4 × 100 m medley: 3:58.49, time obtained on August 1, 2009, along with Fabíola Molina, Carolina Mussi and Gabriella Silva

Short course (25 meters):

- Former South American record holder of the 100m freestyle: 53.19, time obtained on November 11, 2009
- South American record holder of the 200m freestyle: 1:56.43, time obtained on November 14, 2009
- Former South American record holder of the 4x100 freestyle: 3:35.95, time obtained on December 18, 2010, along with Flávia Delaroli, Michelle Lenhardt and Julyana Kury
- Former South American record holder of the 4 × 200 m freestyle: 8:01.78, time obtained on September 9, 2005, along with Paula Baracho, Manuella Lyrio and Joanna Maranhão

== See also ==
- List of South American records in swimming
- List of Brazilian records in swimming
