= Flávia Delaroli =

Brazilian swimmer (born 1983)

Personal information
- Full name: Flávia Renata Delaroli Cazziolato
- Nationality: Brazil
- Born: December 28, 1983 (age 42) Ipatinga, Minas Gerais, Brazil
- Height: 1.76 m (5 ft 9 in)
- Weight: 62 kg (137 lb)

Sport
- Sport: Swimming
- Strokes: Freestyle
Medal record
Women's swimming
Representing Brazil
Pan Pacific
Bronze medal – third place	2006 Victoria	50 m freestyle
Pan American Games
Silver medal – second place	2003 S.Domingo	50 m freestyle
Silver medal – second place	2007 Rio	100 m freestyle
Silver medal – second place	2011 Guadalajara	4×100 m freestyle
Bronze medal – third place	1999 Winnipeg	4×100 m freestyle
Bronze medal – third place	2003 S.Domingo	4×100 m freestyle
Bronze medal – third place	2007 Rio	50 m freestyle

Flávia Renata Delaroli Cazziolato (born December 28, 1983, in Ipatinga, Minas Gerais, Brazil) is an Olympic and National Record holding freestyle swimmer from Brazil.

A resident of São Paulo, she represented her native country at the 2004 and 2008 Olympics.

== International career ==
=== 1999-2004 ===
At 15 years old, Dalaroli took part in the 1999 Pan American Games in Winnipeg, where she was part of the bronze medal winning team in the 4×100-metre freestyle relay. She also placed 4th individually in the 50-metre freestyle race.

Three years later, Delaroli competed at the 2002 FINA World Swimming Championships (25 m) in Moscow, where she went to the 4×100-metre freestyle relay final, ultimately taking 8th place with her teammates. She placed 19th in the 50-metre freestyle, and 33rd in the 100-metre freestyle.

At the 2003 World Aquatics Championships in Barcelona, Delaroli finished 18th in the 50-metre freestyle, 24th in the 100-metre freestyle, 14th in the 4×100-metre freestyle relay, and 14th in the 4×100-metre medley.

Delaroli had her first major international podium placement at the 2003 Pan American Games in Santo Domingo, taking the silver medal in the 50-metre freestyle and the bronze in the 4×100-metre freestyle relay. She also finished at 4th place in the 100-metre freestyle and in the 4×100-metre medley.

=== 2004 Summer Olympics ===
Delaroli competed at the 2004 Summer Olympics in Athens, where she reached the 50-metre freestyle final, finishing in 8th place. She also placed 12th in the 4×100-metre freestyle relay.

=== 2004-2008 ===
On September 11, 2004, along with teammates Talita Ribeiro, Mariana Katsuno and Júlia Leão, Delaroli became the South American record holder in the 4×100-metre medley with a time of 4:09.26.

At the 2004 FINA World Swimming Championships (25 m) in Indianapolis, Delaroli nearly won a medal, finishing in 4th place in the 50-metre freestyle, just 2 hundredths of a second behind the bronze medalist. She also came in 4th place in the 4×100-metre freestyle. In this relay, on October 10, 2004, Delaroli broke her second South American record, with a time of 3:41.52, along with Flávia Jesus, Rebeca Gusmão and Tatiana Lemos.

At the 2005 World Aquatics Championships in Montreal, Delaroli placed 12th in the 50-metre freestyle event. On December 16, 2005, Delaroli broke the South American record in the 50-metre freestyle with a time of 24.36 seconds. She then came in 12th in the same event at the 2006 FINA World Swimming Championships (25 m) in Shanghai, and took bronze in the event at the 2006 Pan Pacific Swimming Championships in Canada.

At the 2007 World Aquatics Championships in Melbourne, Delaroli finished 23rd in the 50-metre freestyle and 32nd in the 100-metre freestyle. Later that year, at the 2007 Pan American Games in Rio de Janeiro, Delaroli won the silver medal in the 100-metre freestyle and took bronze in the 50-metre freestyle. She actually placed 4th in the 50-metre freestyle competition, but when Rebeca Gusmão lost her gold on a finding that she had used performance-enhancing drugs, the gold was given to the silver medalist, the silver to the bronze medalist, and Delaroli received the bronze. She also would have won the silver medal in the 4×100-metre freestyle, and the bronze medal in the 4×100-metre medley, but these medals were annulled by Gusmão's doping.

=== 2008 Summer Olympics ===
At the 2008 Summer Olympics in Beijing, Delaroli finished 22nd in the 50-metre freestyle. She also got the 13th place in the 4×100-metre freestyle.

=== 2008-2012 ===
On August 9, 2008, Delaroli became the South American record holder in the 4×100-metre freestyle securing a time of 3:42.85 together with Tatiana Lemos, Michelle Lenhardt and Monique Ferreira. She received the index for placement into the 2009 World Aquatics Championships in the 50-metre freestyle, with a new South American record (25.06 seconds), obtained in Palhoça (SC) on December 12, 2008. At the subsequent World Aquatics Championships in Rome, Delaroli finished 25th in the 50-metre freestyle.

On December 17, 2009, Delaroli broke the Brazilian record in the 50-metre freestyle Olympic pool with a time of 24.98 seconds.

Delaroli competed at the 2010 Pan Pacific Swimming Championships in Irvine, placing 7th in the 50-metre freestyle, and 34th in the 100-metre freestyle.

Delaroli also swam at the 2010 FINA World Swimming Championships (25 m) in Dubai, where she finished 12th in the 50-metre freestyle, 22nd in the 100-metre freestyle, and 8th in the 4×100-metre freestyle final. In this relay, she swam with Lemos, Lenhardt and Julyana Kury, and her team broke the South American record with a time of 3:35.95.

At the 2011 World Aquatics Championships in Shanghai, she placed 18th in the 50-metre freestyle and 13th in the 4×100-metre freestyle. At the 2011 Pan American Games in Guadalajara, Delaroli won the silver medal in the 4×100-metre freestyle. She also placed 6th in the 50-metre freestyle.

Delaroli competed for the last time at the 2012 FINA World Swimming Championships (25 m) in Istanbul, where she made the 50-metre freestyle final, finishing in 8th place, and the 4×100-metre freestyle final, finishing in 6th place.

== See also ==
- List of South American records in swimming
- List of Brazilian records in swimming
