= Rebeca Gusmão =

Brazilian swimmer (born 1984)

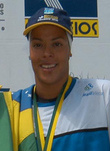
- Rebeca Gusmão in 2005

Personal information
- Full name: Rebeca Braga Lakiss Gusmão
- Born: August 24, 1984 (age 41) Brasília, DF, Brazil
- Height: 1.78 m (5 ft 10 in)

Sport
- Sport: Swimming
- Strokes: Freestyle
- Club: AABB, Distrito Federal
Medal record
Pan American Games
Bronze medal – third place	1999 Winnipeg	4×100 m freestyle
Bronze medal – third place	2003 Santo Domingo	4×100 m freestyle
Disqualified	2007 Rio de Janeiro	50 m freestyle
Disqualified	2007 Rio de Janeiro	100 m freestyle
Disqualified	2007 Rio de Janeiro	4×100 m freestyle
Disqualified	2007 Rio de Janeiro	4×100 m medley
Summer Universiade
Disqualified	2007 Bangkok	50 m freestyle

Rebeca Gusmão (born August 24, 1984) is a former freestyle swimmer from Brazil. She won the bronze medal in the women's 4×100 m freestyle relay at the Pan American Games in Santo Domingo, Dominican Republic. She also participated at the 2004 Olympics and the 2007 Pan American Games.

Gusmão won the women's 50 and 100 freestyle events at the 2007 Pan Ams; however, all her results (times and placings) from those Games were later nullified due to a positive doping-control test. Her medals were also revoked.

== Doping sanction/banning ==
There are 3 testing groups that are relevant to Rebeca Gusmão's doping sanctions:

- an in-competition test from May 25–26, 2006,
- an out-of-competition test on July 13, 2007, and
- the in-competition tests from the 2007 Pan American Games.

Basically, the 2006 test and the out-of-competition test were positive for testosterone; the in-competition tests showed signs of tampering.

On November 5, 2007, Rebeca Gusmão received a provisionally suspension by FINA, the International Swimming Federation, for a positive out-of-competition doping control result for testosterone taken on July 13, 2007. With this, she was temporarily barred from competition (effective November 2, 2007), until a hearing could be held before the FINA Doping Panel.

On December 13, 2007, PASO declared Rebeca Gusmão guilty of doping with testosterone and revoked her XV Pan American Games medals. Her times from the 2007 Pan American Games were also nullified.

On May 16, 2008, the FINA Doping Panel declared Gusmão ineligible for 2 years (beginning November 2, 2007) for the out-of-competition result.

On July 28, 2008, the FINA Doping Panel declared Gusmão ineligible for 2 years (beginning July 17, 2008) for the May 2006 test which contained testosterone. With this decision, all results from May 25, 2006 forward were nullified.

Then September 3, 2008, the FINA Doping Panel banned Gusmão for life ("ineligible for lifetime") due to tampering. All results from July 18, 2007 and forward were (again) annulled.

The full FINA Doping Panel decision from September 3, 2008 can be found online here.

== See also ==
- List of South American records in swimming
- List of Brazilian records in swimming
- List of doping cases in sport
