= Graciele Herrmann =

Brazilian swimmer (born 1992)

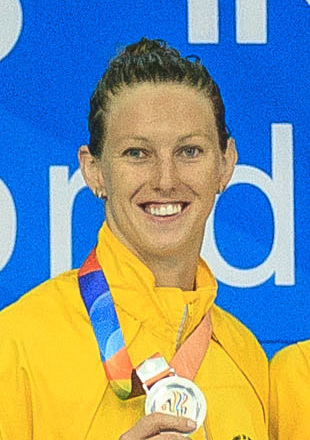
- Herrmann at the 2015 Military World Games

Personal information
- Full name: Graciele Herrmann
- Nationality: Brazil
- Born: January 1, 1992 (age 34) Pelotas, Rio Grande do Sul, Brazil
- Height: 1.81 m (5 ft 11 in)
- Weight: 62 kg (137 lb)

Sport
- Sport: Swimming
- Strokes: Freestyle
Medal record
Representing Brazil
Pan American Games
Silver medal – second place	2011 Guadalajara	50 m freestyle
Silver medal – second place	2011 Guadalajara	4×100 m freestyle
Bronze medal – third place	2015 Toronto	4×100 m freestyle
South American Games
Gold medal – first place	2014 Santiago	50 m freestyle
Gold medal – first place	2014 Santiago	4×100 m freestyle
Silver medal – second place	2014 Santiago	100 m freestyle

Graciele Herrmann (born January 1, 1992) is a Brazil swimmer who competed at the 2012 and 2016 Olympics.

== International career ==
=== 2011–12 ===
She won two silver medals at the 2011 Pan American Games, in the 50-metre freestyle, and in the 4×100-metre freestyle.

=== 2012 Summer Olympics ===
At the 2012 Summer Olympics, she finished 22nd in the Women's 50 metre freestyle.

=== 2013–16 ===
At the 2013 World Aquatics Championships in Barcelona, in the 4×100-metre freestyle, she broke the South American record, with a time of 3:41.05, along with Larissa Oliveira, Daynara de Paula and Alessandra Marchioro. The Brazilian team finished in 11th place, and did not advance to the final. She also finished 18th in the 50-metre freestyle.

At the 2014 South American Games in Santiago, Chile, she won two gold medals in the 50-metre and 4×100-metre freestyle (breaking the competition record in both races) and a silver medal in the 100-metre freestyle.

At the 2014 Maria Lenk Trophy, in São Paulo, Herrmann equaled the South American record in the 50-metre freestyle, with a time of 24.76, opening the 4x50m freestyle relay of her club.

At the 2014 Pan Pacific Swimming Championships in Gold Coast, Queensland, she finished 5th in the 50-metre freestyle; 5th in the 4×100-metre freestyle relay, along with Etiene Medeiros, Daynara de Paula and Alessandra Marchioro; 5th in the 4×100-metre medley relay, along with Etiene Medeiros, Ana Carla Carvalho and Daynara de Paula; and 11th in the 100-metre freestyle.

At the 2015 Pan American Games in Toronto, Ontario, Canada, Herrmann won a bronze medal in the 4 × 100 metre freestyle relay, breaking the South American record, with a time of 3:37.39, along with Larissa Oliveira, Etiene Medeiros and Daynara de Paula. She also finished 6th in the 100 metre freestyle, and 7th in the 50 metre freestyle.

At the 2015 World Aquatics Championships in Kazan, she finished 11th in the 4 × 100 metre freestyle relay, 21st in the 50 metre freestyle and 34th in the 100 metre freestyle

=== 2016 Summer Olympics ===
At the 2016 Summer Olympics, she finished 40th at the Women's 50 metre freestyle.
