= Daynara de Paula =

Brazilian swimmer (born 1989)

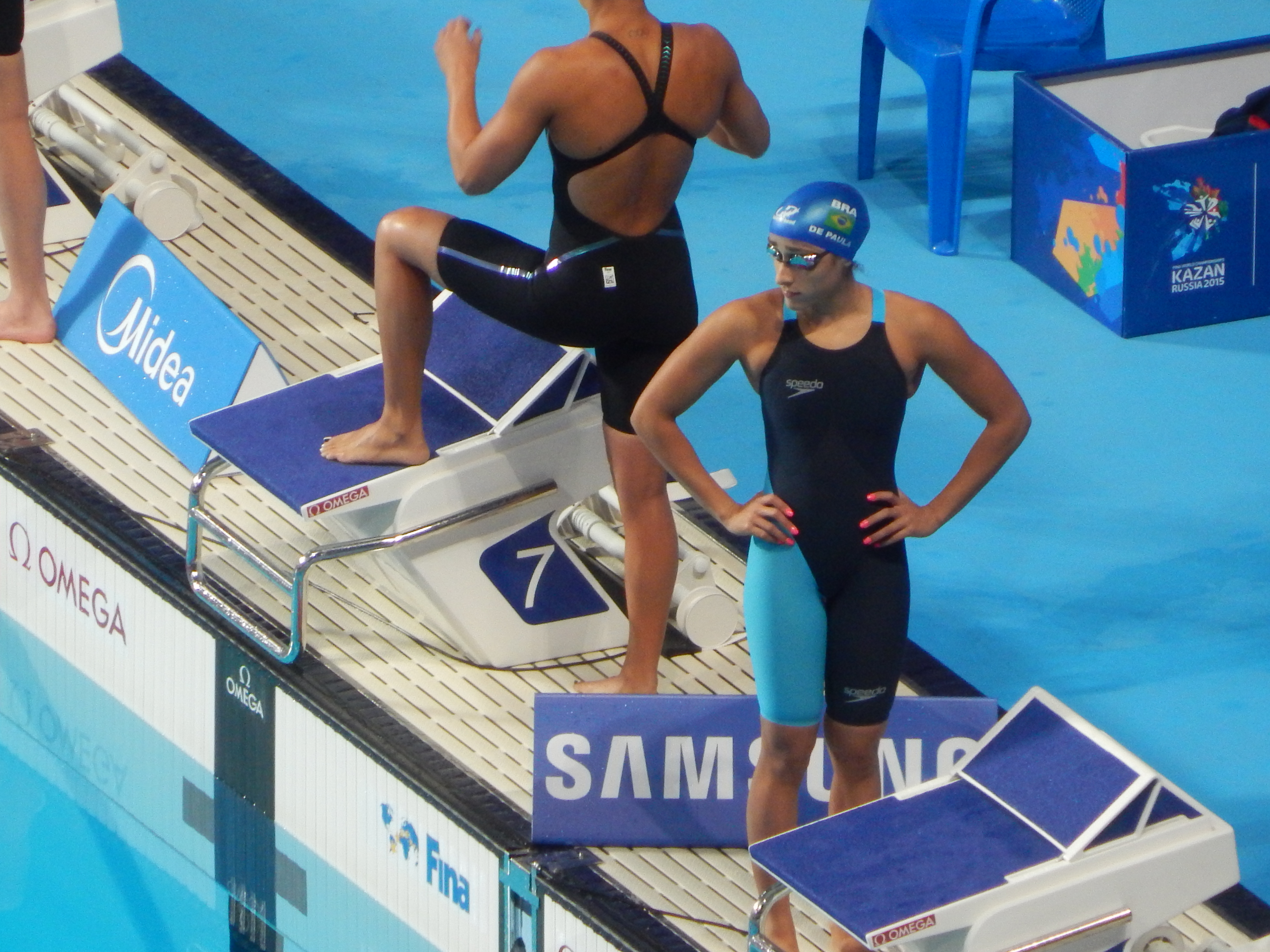
- Kazan 2015

Personal information
- Full name: Daynara Lopes Ferreira de Paula
- Nationality: Brazil
- Born: July 25, 1989 (age 37) Manaus, Amazonas, Brazil
- Height: 1.63 m (5 ft 4 in)
- Weight: 52 kg (115 lb)

Sport
- Sport: Swimming
- Strokes: Butterfly, Freestyle
Medal record
Women's swimming
Representing Brazil
Pan American Games
Silver medal – second place	2011 Guadalajara	100m butterfly
Silver medal – second place	2011 Guadalajara	4x100m freestyle
Silver medal – second place	2019 Lima	4×100 m freestyle
Bronze medal – third place	2011 Guadalajara	4x100m medley
Bronze medal – third place	2015 Toronto	4×100 m freestyle
Bronze medal – third place	2015 Toronto	4×100 m medley
Bronze medal – third place	2019 Lima	4×100 m medley
South American Games
Gold medal – first place	2010 Medellín	50 m butterfly
Gold medal – first place	2010 Medellín	100 m butterfly
Gold medal – first place	2010 Medellín	4x100 m freestyle
Gold medal – first place	2010 Medellín	4x200 m freestyle
Gold medal – first place	2010 Medellín	4x100 m medley
Gold medal – first place	2014 Santiago	100 m butterfly
Gold medal – first place	2014 Santiago	4x100 m freestyle
Gold medal – first place	2014 Santiago	4x100 m medley
Bronze medal – third place	2010 Medellín	50 m freestyle

Daynara Lopes Ferreira de Paula (born July 25, 1989, in Manaus, Amazonas, Brazil) is a Brazilian butterfly swimmer.

== International career ==
=== 2008 Summer Olympics ===
Rooted in São Caetano do Sul as a child, at 11 years old, she won sponsorship to compete across the country. As a Minas Tênis Clube's sportsman, her first major involvement was in 2008 Summer Olympics in Beijing. At 18, she won her Olympic berth in the last Brazilian trials, the Maria Lenk Trophy in Rio de Janeiro. Daynara got it done in the 100-metre butterfly playoffs, where she swam a time of 59.30 seconds - five hundredths time below the FINA index. This time also broke the South American record of Gabriella Silva, 59.79 seconds. In Beijing, she finished 34th in the 100-metre butterfly.

=== 2009–12 ===
At the 2009 World Aquatics Championships in Rome, she finished 10th in the 100-metre butterfly, and reached the 50-metre butterfly final, finishing in 8th place. In the 50-metre butterfly semifinals, she broke the South American record, with a time of 25.85 seconds.

In November 2009, at the Stockholm leg of the 2009 FINA Swimming World Cup, broke the South American record in the 100-metre butterfly (57.23 seconds at heats, and 56.52 seconds in the final, on 10 November) and the 50-metre butterfly (25.94 seconds, on November 11).

Daynara was suspended for 6 months in 2010 after returning a positive doping test for the diuretic furosemide. Competing at the 2011 World Aquatics Championships in Shanghai, Daynara finished 10th in the 50-metre butterfly, 21st in 100-metre butterfly, 17th in the 4×100-metre medley and 13th in the 4×100-metre freestyle.

At the 2011 Pan American Games in Guadalajara, she won the silver medal in the 100-metre butterfly and in the 4×100-metre freestyle, and won bronze in the 4×100-metre medley. She was also in 9th place in the 100-metre freestyle.

=== 2012 Summer Olympics ===
She participated in her second Olympics in 2012 Summer Olympics in London, where she finished 26th in the 100-metre freestyle and 33rd in the 100-metre butterfly.

=== 2012–16 ===
At the 2012 FINA World Swimming Championships (25 m) in Istanbul, she ranked 16th in the 50-metre butterfly, 10th in the 100-metre butterfly and 10th in the 4×100-metre medley. In the 4×100-metre medley heats, Daynara, along with the Brazilian team, broke the South American record with a time of 3:57.66.

At the 2013 World Aquatics Championships in Barcelona, in the 4×100-metre freestyle, she broke the South American record, with a time of 3:41.05, along with Larissa Oliveira, Graciele Herrmann and Alessandra Marchioro. The Brazilian team finished in 11th place, and did not advance to the final. She also finished 15th in the 100-metre butterfly , 20th in the 50-metre butterfly, and 12th in the 4×100-metre medley, along with Etiene Medeiros, Larissa Oliveira and Beatriz Travalon.

At the 2014 Pan Pacific Swimming Championships in Gold Coast, Queensland, she finished 5th in the 4x100-metre freestyle relay, along with Graciele Herrmann, Etiene Medeiros and Alessandra Marchioro; 5th in the 4x100-metre medley relay, along with Graciele Herrmann, Ana Carla Carvalho and Etiene Medeiros; 12th in the 100-metre butterfly; and 19th in the 50-metre freestyle.

At the 2014 FINA World Swimming Championships (25 m) in Doha, Qatar, Daynara de Paula broke the South American record in the semifinals of the Women's 50 metre butterfly, with a time of 25.54. She finished 8th in the final. Daynara was also in another finals: she finished 5th in the Women's 4 × 50 metre medley relay (1:46.47, South American record), along with Etiene Medeiros, Ana Carla Carvalho and Larissa Oliveira; and finished 7th in the Women's 4 × 100 metre freestyle relay (3:33.93, South American record), and 8th in the Women's 4 × 50 metre freestyle relay (1:38.78, South American record), both relays formed by Daynara de Paula, Daiane Oliveira, Alessandra Marchioro and Larissa Oliveira. She also swam the Women's 100 metre butterfly, where she finished in 11th place.

At the 2015 Pan American Games in Toronto, Ontario, Canada, de Paula won two medals in two Brazilian relays: in the 4 × 100 metre freestyle relay (this, breaking the South American record, with a time of 3:37.39) and in the 4 × 100 metre medley relay. She also finished 4th in the 100 metre butterfly.

At the 2015 World Aquatics Championships in Kazan, she finished 6th in the 4 × 100 metre mixed freestyle relay, along with Bruno Fratus, Larissa Oliveira and Matheus Santana, breaking the South American record with a time of 3:25.58; 9th in the 4 × 100 metre mixed medley relay; 11th in the Women's 4 × 100 metre freestyle relay; 13th in the Women's 50 metre butterfly,; 14th in the Women's 4 × 100 metre medley relay; and 18th in the Women's 100 metre butterfly.

=== 2016 Summer Olympics ===
At the 2016 Summer Olympics, she finished 16th in the Women's 100 metre butterfly. She also competed in the Women's 4 × 100 metre freestyle relay, finishing 11th, and in the Women's 4 × 100 metre medley relay, finishing 13th.

=== 2016–20 ===
At the 2019 Pan American Games held in Lima, Peru, she won two medals in the Brazilian relays: one of them, swimming in the finals - silver in the Women's 4 × 100 metre freestyle relay, and one by participating at heats: bronze in the Women's 4 × 100 metre medley relay. She also finished 6th in the Women's 100 metre butterfly and 7th in the Women's 100 metre freestyle.

== See also ==
- Swimming at the 2009 World Aquatics Championships
- List of South American records in swimming
- List of Brazilian records in swimming
