= Swimming at the 2011 Pan American Games – Men's 4 × 100 metre freestyle relay =

Men's 4 × 100 metre freestyle relay at the 2011 Pan American Games
- Venue: Scotiabank Aquatics Center
- Dates: October 16 (preliminaries and finals)

Medalists
Gold medal	Bruno Fratus, Nicholas Santos, Cesar Cielo, Nicolas Oliveira, Gabriel Mangabeira, Thiago Pereira, Henrique Rodrigues	Brazil
Silver medal	William Copeland, Christopher Brady, Robert Savulich, Douglas Robison, Eugene Godsoe, Conor Dwyer	United States
Bronze medal	Octavio Alesi, Crox Acuña, Cristian Quintero, Albert Subirats, Luis Rojas. Roberto Gomez, Daniele Tirabassi	Venezuela

The men's 4 × 100 metre freestyle relay competition of the swimming events at the 2011 Pan American Games took place on 16 October at the Scotiabank Aquatics Center. The defending Pan American Games champion is the Brazil (Fernando Silva, Eduardo Deboni, Nicolas Oliveira and Cesar Cielo).

This race consisted of eight lengths of the pool. Each of the four swimmers completed two lengths of the pool. The first swimmer had to touch the wall before the second could leave the starting block.

== Records ==
Prior to this competition, the existing world and Pan American Games records were as follows:

World record	United States (USA); Michael Phelps (47.51); Garrett Weber-Gale (47.02); Cullen Jones (47.65); Jason Lezak (46.06)	3:08.24	Beijing, China	August 11, 2008
Pan American Games record	Brazil (BRA); Fernando Silva (49.72); Eduardo Deboni (49.15); Nicolas Oliveira (48.85); César Cielo (48.18)	3:15.90	Rio de Janeiro, Brazil	July 20, 2007

== Results ==
All times shown are in minutes.

KEY:	q	Fastest non-qualifiers	Q	Qualified	GR	Games record	NR	National record	PB	Personal best	SB	Seasonal best	PR	Pan American Games record

=== Heats ===
The first round was held on October 16. As only eight teams had entered, the heats served as a ranking round with all eight teams advancing to the final.

Rank	Lane	Name	Nationality	Time	Notes
1	5	William Copeland (49.53); Christopher Brady (49.04); Eugene Godsoe (49.90); Conor Dwyer (49.10)	United States	3:17.57	Q
2	4	Gabriel Mangabeira (50.96); Henrique Rodrigues (49.75); Thiago Pereira (52.02); Nicholas Santos (50.91)	Brazil	3:23.64	Q
3	3	Luis Rojas (52.24); Roberto Gomez (50.24); Daniele Tirabassi (50.64); Octavio Alesi (54.08)	Venezuela	3:27.20	Q
4	7	Gustavo Berretta (52.41); Gerardo Bañuelos (52.04); Alejandro Escudero (52.26); Antonio Cisernos	Mexico	3:29.34	Q
5	8	Rodrigo Caceres (52.98); Gabriel Melconian (52.51); Joel Romeu (55.41); Martin Kutscher (51.18)	Uruguay	3:32.08	Q
6	2	Lyam Dias (53.19); Francis Despond (52.86); Ashton Baumann (52.93); Rory Biskupski (53.13)	Canada	3:32.11	Q
7	1	Sebastian Jahnsen (52.86); Mauricio Fiol (51.94); Jesus Monge (55.45); Gerardo Huidobro (58.92)	Peru	3:39.17	Q
8	6	Charles Hockin (51.86); Renato Prono (56.95); Jose Lobo (51.80); Benjamin Hockin (1:04.37)	Paraguay	3:44.98	Q

=== Final ===
The final was held on October 16.

Rank	Lane	Name	Nationality	Time	Notes
1st place, gold medalist(s)	5	Bruno Fratus (49.36); Nicholas Santos (48.92); Cesar Cielo (47.07); Nicolas Oliveira (49.30)	Brazil	3:14.65	GR
2nd place, silver medalist(s)	4	William Copeland (49.71); Christopher Brady (49.03); Robert Savulich (48.33); Douglas Robison (48.55)	United States	3:15.62	
3rd place, bronze medalist(s)	3	Octavio Alesi (50.87); Crox Acuña (49.88); Cristian Quintero (49.86); Albert Subirats (49.31)	Venezuela	3:19.92	
4	8	Charles Hockin (51.74); Renato Prono (52.91); Jose Lobo (51.94); Benjamin Hockin (49.60)	Paraguay	3:26.19	
5	6	Gerardo Bañuelos (52.57); Alejandro Escudero (51.11); Antonio Cisneros (51.67); Gustavo Berretta (51.28)	Mexico	3:26.63	
6	2	Rodrigo Caceres (52.31); Gabriel Melconian (50.42); Joel Romeu (54.86); Martin Kutscher (50.68)	Uruguay	3:28.27	
7	7	Lyam Dias (52.37); Rory Biskupski (51.36); Francis Despond (52.78); Ashton Baumann (52.91)	Canada	3:29.42	
8	1	Jesus Monge (55.90); Sebastian Jahnsen (54.67); Mauricio Fiol (54.20); Gerardo Huidobro (1:02.78)	Peru	3:47.55	
