= Swimming at the 2014 South American Games – Men's 4 × 100 metre freestyle relay =

Men's 4 x 100 metre freestyle relay at the 2014 South American Games
- Venue: Estadio Nacional
- Dates: March 10, 2014 (heats & finals)
- Winning time: 3:19.44

Medalists
gold medal	Nicolas Oliveira, Matheus Santana, Fernando dos Santos and Fernando Silva	Brazil
silver medal	Joaquin Belza, Matías Aguilera, Guido Buscaglia and Federico Grabich	Argentina
bronze medal	Jesus Daniel Lopez, Roberto Goméz, Migue Angel Perez and Albert Subirats	Venezuela

The men's 4 x 100 metre freestyle relay competition at the 2014 South American Games took place on March 10 at the Estadio Nacional. The last champion was Venezuela.

This race consisted of eight lengths of the pool. Each of the four swimmers completed two lengths of the pool. The first swimmer had to touch the wall before the second could leave the starting block.

== Records ==
Prior to this competition, the existing world and Pan Pacific records were as follows:

World record	United States (USA); Michael Phelps (47.51); Garrett Weber-Gale (47.02); Cullen Jones (47.65); Jason Lezak (46.06)	3:08.24	Beijing, China	August 11, 2008
South American Games record	Venezuela (VEN); Albert Subirats (50.71); Christian Quintero (51.35); Daniele Tirabassi (51.18); Crox Acuña (49.65)	3:22.89	Medellín, Colombia	March 28, 2010

== Results ==
All times are in minutes and seconds.

KEY:	q	Fastest non-qualifiers	Q	Qualified	CR	Championships record	NR	National record	PB	Personal best	SB	Seasonal best

=== Heats ===
Heats weren't performed, as only seven teams had entered.

=== Final ===
The final was held on March 10, at 21:21.

Rank	Lane	Name	Nationality	Time	Notes
1st place, gold medalist(s)	4	Nicolas Oliveira (50.17); Matheus Santana (48.99); Fernando dos Santos (50.12); Fernando Silva (50.16)	Brazil	3:19.44	CR
2nd place, silver medalist(s)	5	Joaquin Belza (52.06); Matías Aguilera (49.67); Guido Buscaglia (50.61); Federico Grabich (48.97)	Argentina	3:21.31	NR
3rd place, bronze medalist(s)	6	Jesus Daniel Lopez (51.70); Roberto Goméz (50.87); Migue Angel Perez (50.64); Albert Subirats (48.27)	Venezuela	3:21.48	
4	1	Alberto Morales (51.69); Mauricio Vasquez (52.26); Julio Galofre (52.20); Juan Pablo Botero (51.15)	Colombia	3:27.30	
5	2	Enzo Martinez Scarpe (52.79); Gabriel Fleitas Lago (51.44); Martin Melconian Alvez (54.09); Gabriel Melconian Alvez (50.13)	Uruguay	3:28.45	
6	7	Oliver Elliot (52.11); Javier Vazquez Gonzalez (54.06); Martín Marchetti (54.47); Cristian Zapata Pavez (54.84)	Chile	3:35.48	
7	3	William Vallejos Reyes (54.57); Carlos Orihuela Gianotti (53.79); Matias Gadea Basualdo (53.79); Jose Lobo Martinez (53.77)	Paraguay	3:35.92	
-	8	- - - -	Ecuador	DNS	
