= Swimming at the 2014 South American Games – Men's 4 × 200 metre freestyle relay =

Men's 4 x 200 metre freestyle relay at the 2014 South American Games
- Venue: Estadio Nacional
- Dates: March 8, 2014 (heats & finals)
- Winning time: 7:25.35

Medalists
gold medal	Nicolas Oliveira, Thiago Pereira, Fernando Silva and Fernando dos Santos	Brazil
silver medal	Alberto Morales, Mauricio Vasquez, Julio Galofre and Mateo de Angulo	Colombia
bronze medal	Daniele Tirabassi, Cristian Delgado, Marcos Mora and Migue Angel Perez	Venezuela

The men's 4 x 200 metre freestyle relay competition at the 2014 South American Games took place on March 8 at the Estadio Nacional. The last champion was Venezuela.

This race consisted of sixteen lengths of the pool. Each of the four swimmers completed four lengths of the pool. The first swimmer had to touch the wall before the second could leave the starting block.

== Records ==
Prior to this competition, the existing world and Pan Pacific records were as follows:

World record	United States (USA); Michael Phelps (1:44.49); Ricky Berens (1:44.13); David Walters (1:45.47); Ryan Lochte (1:44.46)	6:58.55	Rome, Italy	July 31, 2009
South American Games record	Venezuela (VEN); Daniele Tirabassi (1:53.52); Crox Acuña (1:50.71); Alejandro Gómez (1:53.51); Christian Quintero (1:51.38)	7:29.12	Medellín, Colombia	March 27, 2010

== Results ==
All times are in minutes and seconds.

KEY:	q	Fastest non-qualifiers	Q	Qualified	CR	Championships record	NR	National record	PB	Personal best	SB	Seasonal best

=== Heats ===
Heats weren't performed, as only six teams had entered.

=== Final ===
The final was held on March 8, at 20:12.

Rank	Lane	Name	Nationality	Time	Notes
1st place, gold medalist(s)	3	Nicolas Oliveira (1:49.17) CR; Thiago Pereira (1:52.00); Fernando Silva (1:52.01); Fernando dos Santos (1:52.17)	Brazil	7:25.35	CR
2nd place, silver medalist(s)	1	Alberto Morales (1:52.54); Mauricio Vasquez (1:55.13); Julio Galofre (1:52.46); Mateo de Angulo (1:50.42)	Colombia	7:30.55	
3rd place, bronze medalist(s)	4	Daniele Tirabassi (1:51.32); Cristian Delgado (1:53.86); Marcos Lavado (1:52.71); Migue Angel Perez (1:52.78)	Venezuela	7:30.67	
4	5	Martín Naidich (1:54.72); Federico Grabich (1:51.75); Diego Lupacchini (1:53.51); Juan Pereyra (1:54.65)	Argentina	7:34.63	
5	6	Matías López (1:55.22); Maximiliano Abreu (1:56.18); Charles Hockin (1:55.25); Ben Hockin (1:55.18)	Paraguay	7:41.83	
6	2	Cristian Zapata Pavez (2:00.08); Eduardo Opazo Rojas (1:58.32); Javier Vazquez Gonzalez (1:58.90); Miguel Tapia Salinas (1:57.02)	Chile	7:54.32	
