= Swimming at the 2014 South American Games – Men's 100 metre freestyle =

Men's 100 metre freestyle at the 2014 South American Games
- Venue: Estadio Nacional
- Dates: March 10, 2014 (heats & finals)
- Competitors: 22 from 12 nations
- Winning time: 49.13

Medalists
| gold medal | Matheus Santana | Brazil |
| silver medal | Federico Grabich | Argentina |
| bronze medal | Albert Subirats | Venezuela |

The men's 100 metre freestyle competition at the 2014 South American Games took place on March 10 at the Estadio Nacional. The last champion was Crox Acuña of Venezuela.

This race consisted of two lengths of the pool, both lengths being in freestyle.

== Records ==
Prior to this competition, the existing world and Pan Pacific records were as follows:

| World record | César Cielo Filho (BRA) | 46.91 | Rome, Italy | July 30, 2009 |
| South American Games record | José Meolans (ARG) | 49.48 | Buenos Aires, Argentina | November 17, 2006 |

== Results ==
All times are in minutes and seconds.

| KEY: | q | Fastest non-qualifiers | Q | Qualified | CR | Championships record | NR | National record | PB | Personal best | SB | Seasonal best |

=== Heats ===
The first round was held on March 10, at 12:10.

| Rank | Heat | Lane | Name | Nationality | Time | Notes |
|---|---|---|---|---|---|---|
| 1 | 3 | 4 | Matheus Santana | Brazil | 49.94 | Q |
| 2 | 3 | 3 | Federico Grabich | Argentina | 50.24 | Q |
| 3 | 3 | 5 | Albert Subirats | Venezuela | 50.52 | Q |
| 4 | 1 | 5 | Matías Aguilera | Argentina | 50.91 | Q |
| 5 | 1 | 4 | Benjamin Hockin | Paraguay | 50.97 | Q |
| 6 | 2 | 4 | Fernando Silva | Brazil | 51.12 | Q |
| 7 | 3 | 6 | Renzo Tjon-A-Joe | Suriname | 51.32 | Q |
| 8 | 2 | 3 | Roberto Goméz | Venezuela | 51.37 | Q |
| 9 | 2 | 5 | Mauricio Fiol | Peru | 51.44 | |
| 10 | 1 | 6 | Enzo Martinez Scarpe | Uruguay | 51.56 | |
| 11 | 1 | 3 | Alberto Morales | Colombia | 51.71 | |
| 12 | 2 | 6 | Juan Pablo Botero | Colombia | 51.73 | |
| 13 | 2 | 2 | Oliver Elliot | Chile | 51.87 | |
| 14 | 1 | 1 | Zuhayr Pigot | Suriname | 52.40 | |
| 15 | 3 | 7 | Gabriel Fleitas Lago | Uruguay | 52.44 | |
| 16 | 3 | 2 | Jemal Le Grand | Aruba | 52.49 | |
| 17 | 1 | 2 | Jose Lobo Martinez | Paraguay | 54.35 | |
| 18 | 2 | 1 | Aldo Castillo Sulca | Bolivia | 54.96 | |
| 19 | 2 | 7 | Tyrone Alvarado Cervantes | Ecuador | 55.13 | |
| 20 | 3 | 1 | Martín Marchetti | Chile | 55.24 | |
| 21 | 1 | 7 | Byron Franco Zambrano | Ecuador | 55.98 | |
| 22 | 3 | 8 | Jose Quintanilla Moreno | Bolivia | 56.33 | |

=== Final ===
The final was held on March 10, at 20:39.

| Rank | Lane | Name | Nationality | Time | Notes |
|---|---|---|---|---|---|
| 1st place, gold medalist(s) | 4 | Matheus Santana | Brazil | 49.13 | CR |
| 2nd place, silver medalist(s) | 5 | Federico Grabich | Argentina | 49.66 | |
| 3rd place, bronze medalist(s) | 3 | Albert Subirats | Venezuela | 49.72 | |
| 4 | 6 | Matías Aguilera | Argentina | 50.56 | |
| 5 | 2 | Benjamin Hockin | Paraguay | 50.62 | |
| 6 | 7 | Fernando Silva | Brazil | 50.87 | |
| 7 | 1 | Renzo Tjon-A-Joe | Suriname | 50.89 | NR |
| 8 | 8 | Roberto Goméz | Venezuela | 51.31 | |
