= Swimming at the 2014 South American Games – Men's 200 metre freestyle =

Men's 200 metre freestyle at the 2014 South American Games
- Venue: Estadio Nacional
- Dates: March 7, 2014 (heats & finals)
- Competitors: 16 from 10 nations
- Winning time: 1:49.39

Medalists
gold medal	Federico Grabich	Argentina
silver medal	Nicolas Oliveira	Brazil
bronze medal	Mauricio Fiol	Peru

The men's 200 metre freestyle competition at the 2014 South American Games took place on March 7 at the Estadio Nacional. The last champion was Federico Grabich of Argentina.

This race consisted of four lengths of the pool, all in freestyle.

== Records ==
Prior to this competition, the existing world and Pan Pacific records were as follows:

World record	Paul Biedermann (GER)	1:42.00	Rome, Italy	July 28, 2009
South American Games record	Federico Grabich (ARG)	1:50.81	Medellín, Colombia	March 26, 2010

== Results ==
All times are in minutes and seconds.

KEY:	q	Fastest non-qualifiers	Q	Qualified	CR	Championships record	NR	National record	PB	Personal best	SB	Seasonal best

=== Heats ===
The first round was held on March 7, at 12:31.

Rank	Heat	Lane	Name	Nationality	Time	Notes
1	1	3	Federico Grabich	Argentina	1:52.44	Q
2	1	4	Nicolas Oliveira	Brazil	1:52.55	Q
3	2	5	Fernando dos Santos	Brazil	1:53.63	Q
4	2	6	Daniele Tirabassi	Venezuela	1:53.74	Q
5	1	2	Diego Lupacchini	Argentina	1:54.04	Q
6	2	4	Benjamin Hockin	Paraguay	1:54.27	Q
7	2	3	Mauricio Fiol	Peru	1:54.42	Q
8	1	5	Julio Galofre	Colombia	1:54.52	Q
9	2	2	Alberto Morales	Colombia	1:54.66	
10	1	6	Migue Angel Perez	Venezuela	1:54.97	
11	2	7	Jemal Le Grand	Aruba	1:55.98	
12	1	7	Gabriel Fleitas Lago	Uruguay	1:56.44	
13	2	1	Maximiliano Abreu	Paraguay	1:57.61	
14	1	1	Javier Vazquez Gonzalez	Chile	1:57.80	
15	2	8	Cristian Zapata Pavez	Chile	1:59.91	
16	1	8	Aldo Castillo Sulca	Bolivia	2:03.35	

=== Final ===
The final was held on March 7, at 20:34.

Rank	Lane	Name	Nationality	Time	Notes
1st place, gold medalist(s)	4	Federico Grabich	Argentina	1:49.39	CR
2nd place, silver medalist(s)	5	Nicolas Oliveira	Brazil	1:49.72	
3rd place, bronze medalist(s)	1	Mauricio Fiol	Peru	1:50.30	NR
4	7	Benjamin Hockin	Paraguay	1:51.31	
5	3	Fernando dos Santos	Brazil	1:51.38	
6	6	Daniele Tirabassi	Venezuela	1:52.35	
7	8	Julio Galofre	Colombia	1:53.11	
8	2	Diego Lupacchini	Argentina	1:55.15	
