= Swimming at the 2019 Pan American Games =

- Swimming pictograms
- Venue: Aquatics Centre (Swimming); Laguna Bujama (Open water swimming)
- Dates: 4–10 August
- Competitors: 366 from 37 nations

The swimming competitions at the 2019 Pan American Games in Lima were held from 6 to 10 August at the Aquatic Centre. The open-water marathon was held on August 4 in Laguna Bujama.

== Events ==
Similar to the program's format in 2015, swimming features a total of 36 events (17 each for men and women and 2 mixed), including two 10 km open-water marathons. The following events will be contested (all pool events are long course, and distances are in metres unless stated):

- Freestyle: 50, 100, 200, 400, 800, and 1,500;
- Backstroke: 100 and 200;
- Breaststroke: 100 and 200;
- Butterfly: 100 and 200;
- Individual medley: 200 and 400;
- Relays: 4 × 100 free (including mixed), 4 × 200 free, 4 × 100 medley (including mixed)
- Marathon: 10 kilometres

== Schedule ==
All times are Peru Time (UTC-5)

== Medal summary ==
=== Medal table ===
* Host nation (Peru)

Rank	Nation	Gold	Silver	Bronze	Total
1	United States	21	16	8	45
2	Brazil	11	9	13	33
3	Argentina	4	3	3	10
4	Canada	1	8	6	15
5	Ecuador	1	0	0	1
6	Chile	0	1	0	1
6	Guatemala	0	1	0	1
8	Mexico	0	0	6	6
9	Colombia	0	0	1	1
9	Trinidad and Tobago	0	0	1	1
Totals (10 entries)		38	38	38	114

=== Medalists ===
==== Men's events ====
Event	Gold		Silver		Bronze	
50 m freestyle	Bruno Fratus; Brazil	21.61	Nathan Adrian; United States	21.87	Michael Chadwick; United States	21.99
100 m freestyle	Marcelo Chierighini; Brazil	48.09	Nathan Adrian; United States	48.17	Michael Chadwick; United States	48.88
200 m freestyle	Fernando Scheffer; Brazil	1:46.68	Breno Correia; Brazil	1:47.47	Drew Kibler; United States	1:47.71
400 m freestyle	Andrew Abruzzo; United States	3:48.41	Fernando Scheffer; Brazil	3:49.60	Luiz Altamir Melo; Brazil	3:49.91
800 m freestyle	Andrew Abruzzo; United States	7:54.70	Miguel Valente; Brazil	7:56.37	Ricardo Vargas; Mexico	7:56.78
1500 m freestyle	Guilherme Costa; Brazil	15:09.93	Nicholas Sweetser; United States	15:14.24	Ricardo Vargas; Mexico	15:14.99
100 m backstroke	Daniel Carr; United States	53.50	Guilherme Guido; Brazil	53.54	Dylan Carter; Trinidad and Tobago	54.42
200 m backstroke	Daniel Carr; United States	1:58.13	Nick Alexander; United States	1:58.30	Leonardo de Deus; Brazil	1:58.73
100 m breaststroke	João Gomes Júnior; Brazil	59.51	Cody Miller; United States	59.57	Kevin Cordes; United States	1:00.27
200 m breaststroke	Will Licon; United States	2:07.62 GR	Nicolas Fink; United States	2:08.16	Miguel de Lara; Mexico	2:11.23
100 m butterfly	Tom Shields; United States	51.59	Luis Martínez; Guatemala	51.63	Vinicius Lanza; Brazil	51.88
200 m butterfly	Leonardo de Deus; Brazil	1:55.86	Samuel Pomajevich; United States	1:57.35	Jonathan Gómez; Colombia	1:57.75
200 m individual medley	Will Licon; United States	1:59.13	Caio Pumputis; Brazil	2:00.12	Leonardo Coelho Santos; Brazil	2:00.29
400 m individual medley	Charlie Swanson; United States	4:11.46	Leonardo Coelho Santos; Brazil	4:19.41	Brandonn Almeida; Brazil	4:21.10
4 × 100 m freestyle relay	Brazil; Breno Correia; Marcelo Chierighini; Bruno Fratus; Pedro Spajari	3:12.61 GR	United States; Michael Chadwick; Drew Kibler; Grant House; Nathan Adrian	3:14.94	Mexico; Gabriel Castaño; Daniel Ramírez; Jorge Iga; Long Gutiérrez	3:17.70
4 × 200 m freestyle relay	Brazil; Luiz Altamir Melo; Fernando Scheffer; João de Lucca; Breno Correia	7:10.66 GR	United States; Drew Kibler; Grant House; Samuel Pomajevich; Christopher Wieser	7:14.82	Mexico; Jorge Iga; Long Gutiérrez; José Martínez; Ricardo Vargas	7:19.43
4 × 100 m medley relay	United States; Daniel Carr; Nicolas Fink; Tom Shields; Nathan Adrian; Nicholas Alexander*; Matthew Josa*; Michael Chadwick*	3:30.25 GR	Brazil; Guilherme Guido; João Gomes Júnior; Vinicius Lanza; Marcelo Chierighini; Leonardo de Deus*; Felipe Lima*; Luiz Altamir Melo*; Breno Correia*	3:30.98	Argentina; Agustin Hernandez; Gabriel Morelli; Santiago Grassi; Federico Grabich; Nicolas Deferrari*; Guido Buscaglia*	3:38.41
10 km open water	Esteban Enderica; Ecuador	1:53:46.7	Taylor Abbott; United States	1:54:02.7	Victor Colonese; Brazil	1:54:03.6
AM Americas record | WJR World Junior record | WR World record NR National record (Any world record is necessarily also an Americas and national record. Area records (for continental regions) are also national records.)

^{a} Swimmers who participated in the heats only and received medals.

==== Women's events ====
Event	Gold		Silver		Bronze	
50 m freestyle	Etiene Medeiros; Brazil	24.88	Margo Geer; United States	25.03	Madison Kennedy; United States	25.14
100 m freestyle	Margo Geer; United States	54.17	Alexia Zevnik; Canada	55.04	Larissa Oliveira; Brazil	55.25
200 m freestyle	Claire Rasmus; United States	1:58.64	Meaghan Raab; United States	1:58.70	Larissa Oliveira; Brazil	1:59.78
400 m freestyle	Delfina Pignatiello; Argentina	4:10.86	Danica Ludlow; Canada	4:11.97	Alyson Ackman; Canada	4:12.05
800 m freestyle	Delfina Pignatiello; Argentina	8:29.42	Mariah Denigan; United States	8:34.18	Viviane Jungblut; Brazil	8:36.04
1500 m freestyle	Delfina Pignatiello; Argentina	16:16.54	Kristel Köbrich; Chile	16:18.19	Rebecca Mann; United States	16:23.23
100 m backstroke	Phoebe Bacon; United States	59.47	Danielle Hanus; Canada	1:00.34	Etiene Medeiros; Brazil	1:00.67
200 m backstroke	Alexandra Walsh; United States	2:08.30	Isabelle Stadden; United States	2:08.39	Mackenzie Glover; Canada	2:10.95
100 m breaststroke	Anne Lazor; United States	1:06.94	Julia Sebastián; Argentina	1:07.09	Faith Knelson; Canada	1:07.42
200 m breaststroke	Anne Lazor; United States	2:21.40 GR	Bethany Galat; United States	2:21.84	Julia Sebastián; Argentina	2:25.43
100 m butterfly	Kendyl Stewart; United States	58.49	Danielle Hanus; Canada	58.93	Sarah Gibson; United States	59.11
200 m butterfly	Virginia Bardach; Argentina	2:10.87	Mary-Sophie Harvey; Canada	2:11.68	Meghan Small; United States	2:12.51
200 m individual medley	Alexandra Walsh; United States	2:11.24	Meghan Small; United States	2:11.36	Bailey Andison; Canada	2:14.14
400 m individual medley	Tessa Cieplucha; Canada	4:39.90	Virginia Bardach; Argentina	4:41.05	Mary-Sophie Harvey; Canada	4:43.20
4 × 100 m freestyle relay	United States; Lia Neal; Claire Rasmus; Kendyl Stewart; Margo Geer	3:39.59	Brazil; Etiene Medeiros; Larissa Oliveira; Manuella Lyrio; Daynara de Paula	3:40.39	Canada; Alyson Ackman; Kyla Leibel; Katerine Savard; Alexia Zevnik	3:41.01
4 × 200 m freestyle relay	United States; Claire Rasmus; Alexandra Walsh; Sarah Gibson; Meaghan Raab	7:57.33	Canada; Alyson Ackman; Katerine Savard; Danica Ludlow; Mary-Sophie Harvey	7:59.16	Brazil; Aline Rodrigues; Larissa Oliveira; Manuella Lyrio; Gabrielle Roncatto	8:07.77
4 × 100 m medley relay	United States; Phoebe Bacon; Anne Lazor; Kendyl Stewart; Margo Geer; Isabelle Stadden*; Molly Hannis*; Sarah Gibson*; Lia Neal*	3:57.64	Canada; Danielle Hanus; Faith Knelson; Haley Black; Alexia Zevnik; Mackenzie Glover*; Mary-Sophie Harvey*; Katerine Savard*; Alyson Ackman*	4:01.90	Brazil; Etiene Medeiros; Jhennifer Conceição; Giovanna Diamante; Larissa Oliveira; Fernanda de Goeij*; Pâmela de Souza*; Daynara de Paula*; Manuella Lyrio*	4:04.96
10 km open water	Ana Marcela Cunha; Brazil	2:00:51.9	Cecilia Biagioli; Argentina	2:01:23.2	Viviane Jungblut; Brazil	2:01:24.0
AM Americas record | WJR World Junior record | WR World record NR National record (Any world record is necessarily also an Americas and national record. Area records (for continental regions) are also national records.)

^{b} Swimmers who participated in the heats only and received medals.

==== Mixed ====
Event	Gold		Silver		Bronze	
4 × 100 m freestyle relay	United States; Michael Chadwick; Nathan Adrian; Claire Rasmus; Margo Geer; Andrew Abruzzo*; Charles Swanson*; Madison Kennedy*; Ali DeLoof*	3:24.84	Brazil; Breno Correia; Marcelo Chierighini; Larissa Oliveira; Etiene Medeiros; João de Lucca*; Pedro Spajari*; Lorrane Ferreira*; Camila Mello*	3:25.97	Mexico; Daniel Ramírez; Jorge Iga; Monika González-Hermosillo; María Mata; Tayde Revilak*; Marie Condé*; José Martínez*	3:31.36
4 × 100 m medley relay	Brazil; Guilherme Guido; João Gomes Júnior; Giovanna Diamante; Larissa Oliveira; Jhennifer Conceição*; Manuella Lyrio*; Leonardo de Deus*; Vinicius Lanza*	3:48.61	Canada; Javier Acevedo; James Dergousoff; Danielle Hanus; Alexia Zevnik; Haley Black*; Kyla Leibel*	3:49.97	Argentina; Andrea Berrino; Julia Sebastian; Santiago Grassi; Federico Grabich; Virginia Bardach*; Florencia Perotti*; Lautaro Rodriguez*; Roberto Strelkov*	3:50.53
AM Americas record | WJR World Junior record | WR World record NR National record (Any world record is necessarily also an Americas and national record. Area records (for continental regions) are also national records.)

== Qualification ==
A total of 350 swimmers will qualify in the pool and a total of 40 additional open water swimmers will qualify as well. As Host Country, Peru automatically will qualify 18 male and 18 female competitors in the pool. Each National Olympic Committee (NOC) may use proven swim times attained during the qualification period of those swimmers who have met the qualifying standards established by the UANA for the 2019 Pan American Games at a competition recognized by the FINA from the official list of approved qualifying competitions for the 18th FINA World Aquatics Championships held in Gwangju, Korea. Each event (besides the relays) have an A standard (two entries allowed) or a B standard (one entry allowed). Countries not qualified can enter one male and one female swimmer through the universality rule. In open water, Canada and the USA automatically qualify two per gender, with eight spots being awarded in each gender to CONSANAT and CCCAN.

== Participation ==
=== Participating nations ===
Athletes from -- nations competed in swimming at the 2019 Pan American Games

== See also ==
- Swimming at the 2019 Parapan American Games
- Swimming at the 2020 Summer Olympics
