= Swimming at the 2010 South American Games – Men's 200 metre freestyle =

The Men's 200m freestyle event at the 2010 South American Games was held on March 26, with the heats at 11:21 and the Final at 18:59.

== Medalists ==
Gold	Silver	Bronze
Federico Grabich; Argentina	Ben Hockin; Paraguay	Nicolas Oliveira; Brazil

== Records ==
Standing records prior to the 2010 South American Games
World record	Paul Biedermann (GER)	1:42.00	Rome, Italy	28 July 2009
Competition Record	Martin Kutscher (URU)	1:52.35	Buenos Aires, Argentina	18 November 2006
South American record	Thiago Pereira (BRA)	1:46.57	Rome, Italy	31 July 2009

== Results ==
=== Heats ===
Rank	Heat	Lane	Athlete	Result	Notes
1	2	7	Ben Hockin (PAR)	1:52.98	Q
2	1	3	Federico Grabich (ARG)	1:53.40	Q
3	2	5	Daniele Tirabassi (VEN)	1:53.53	Q
4	1	2	Mateo de Angulo (COL)	1:53.67	Q
5	2	3	Crox Acuña (VEN)	1:54.07	Q
6	1	6	Martin Kutscher (URU)	1:54.13	Q
7	1	5	Julio Galofre (COL)	1:54.16	Q
7	2	4	Nicolas Oliveira (BRA)	1:54.16	Q
9	1	4	Rodrigo Castro (BRA)	1:55.32	
10	2	2	Juan Martin Pereyra (ARG)	1:56.05	
11	1	7	Sebastian Arispe Silva (PER)	1:56.70	
12	2	1	Jose Enmanuel Martinez (PAR)	1:56.98	
13	2	6	Sebastian Madico (PER)	1:57.04	
14	1	1	Jemal Le Grand (ARU)	1:59.93	
15	1	8	Armando Esteban Claure (BOL)	2:10.91	
16	2	8	Martin Peter Manattini (BOL)	2:11.00	

=== Final ===
Rank	Lane	Athlete	Result	Notes
1st place, gold medalist(s)	5	Federico Grabich (ARG)	1:50.81	CR
2nd place, silver medalist(s)	4	Ben Hockin (PAR)	1:51.48	
3rd place, bronze medalist(s)	8	Nicolas Oliveira (BRA)	1:51.51	
4	2	Crox Acuña (VEN)	1:51.78	
5	1	Julio Galofre (COL)	1:52.27	
6	3	Daniele Tirabassi (VEN)	1:53.07	
7	7	Martin Kutscher (URU)	1:53.73	
8	6	Mateo de Angulo (COL)	1:54.59	
