= Swimming at the 2010 South American Games – Men's 100 metre freestyle =

The Men's 100m freestyle event at the 2010 South American Games was held on March 29, with the heats at 10:44 and the Final at 18:15.

== Medalists ==
Gold	Silver	Bronze
Crox Acuña; Venezuela	Nicolas Oliveira; Brazil; Ben Hockin; Paraguay	no medal

== Records ==
Standing records prior to the 2010 South American Games
World record	César Cielo (BRA)	46.91	Rome, Italy	30 July 2009
Competition Record	José Meolans (ARG)	49.48	Buenos Aires, Argentina	17 November 2006
South American record	César Cielo (BRA)	46.91	Rome, Italy	30 July 2009

== Results ==
=== Heats ===
Rank	Heat	Lane	Athlete	Result	Notes
1	3	5	Crox Acuña (VEN)	50.79	Q
2	3	4	Nicolas Oliveira (BRA)	50.85	Q
3	3	2	Ben Hockin (PAR)	51.31	Q
4	1	4	Federico Grabich (ARG)	51.41	Q
5	2	3	Christian Quintero (VEN)	51.81	Q
6	1	3	Martin Kutscher (URU)	52.30	Q
7	3	6	Juan Cambindo (COL)	52.31	Q
8	2	4	Guilherme Roth (BRA)	52.33	Q
9	2	6	Rodrigo Caceres (URU)	52.51	
10	1	5	Julio Galofre (COL)	53.02	
10	2	7	Jose Enmanuel Martinez (PAR)	53.16	
12	1	6	Sabastian Arispe Silva (PER)	53.39	
13	1	7	Jemalle Grand (ARU)	53.78	
14	3	3	Juan Lisandro Monzon (ARG)	53.91	
15	2	2	Mario Navarro (ECU)	54.34	
16	1	2	Oliver Banados (CHI)	54.42	
17	3	1	Diego Macias (ECU)	54.89	
18	2	1	Martin Peter Manattini (BOL)	54.92	
19	1	1	Niall Roberts (GUY)	56.43	
20	1	8	Fabian Binns (GUY)	1:00.50	
21	2	8	Armando Esteban Claure (BOL)	1:00.99	
	2	5	Sebastian Madico (PER)	DNS	
	3	7	Hycinth Cijntje (AHO)	DNS	
	3	8	Jair Boerenveen (SUR)	DNS	

=== Final ===
Rank	Lane	Athlete	Result	Notes
1st place, gold medalist(s)	4	Crox Acuña (VEN)	50.29	
2nd place, silver medalist(s)	3	Ben Hockin (PAR)	50.50	
2nd place, silver medalist(s)	5	Nicolas Oliveira (BRA)	50.50	
4	6	Federico Grabich (ARG)	50.59	
5	2	Christian Quintero (VEN)	51.37	
6	7	Martin Kutscher (URU)	51.84	
7	1	Guilherme Roth (BRA)	52.07	
8	8	Rodrigo Caceres (URU)	52.53	
