= Swimming at the 2010 South American Games – Men's 4 × 100 metre freestyle relay =

The men's 4x100 m freestyle relay event at the 2010 South American Games was held on March 29 at 19:20.

== Medalists ==
Gold	Silver	Bronze
Albert Subirats; Christian Quintero; Daniele Tirabassi; Crox Acuña; Venezuela	Nicolas Oliveira; Guilherme Roth; Rodrigo Castro; Thiago Pereira; Brazil	Juan Cambindo; Daniel Cuellar; Julio Galofre; Marco González; Colombia

== Records ==
Standing records prior to the 2010 South American Games
World record	United States	3:08.24	Beijing, China	11 August 2008
Competition Record	Argentina	3:24.16	Buenos Aires, Argentina	18 November 2006
South American record	Brazil	3:21.67	Mar del Plata, Argentina	15 April 2000

== Results ==
=== Final ===
Rank	Lane	Athlete	Result	Notes
1st place, gold medalist(s)	5	Venezuela	3:22.89	CR
1st place, gold medalist(s)	5	Albert Subirats	50.71	CR
1st place, gold medalist(s)	5	Christian Quintero	51.35	CR
1st place, gold medalist(s)	5	Daniele Tirabassi	51.18	CR
1st place, gold medalist(s)	5	Crox Acuña	49.65	CR
2nd place, silver medalist(s)	4	Brazil	3:24.56	
2nd place, silver medalist(s)	4	Nicolas Oliveira	50.99	
2nd place, silver medalist(s)	4	Guilherme Roth	51.62	
2nd place, silver medalist(s)	4	Rodrigo Castro	50.83	
2nd place, silver medalist(s)	4	Thiago Pereira	51.12	
3rd place, bronze medalist(s)	6	Colombia	3:26.16	
3rd place, bronze medalist(s)	6	Juan Cambindo	52.60	
3rd place, bronze medalist(s)	6	Daniel Cuellar	51.84	
3rd place, bronze medalist(s)	6	Julio Galofre	51.14	
3rd place, bronze medalist(s)	6	Marco González	50.58	
4	7	Paraguay	3:29.62	
4	7	José Enmanuel Lobo	53.03	
4	7	Favio Persano Segovia	54.24	
4	7	Charles Hockin	52.21	
4	7	Ben Hockin	50.14	
5	3	Argentina	3:29.71	
5	3	Martín Naidich	53.09	
5	3	Federico Grabich	50.28	
5	3	Juan Monzón	53.10	
5	3	Gustavo Paschetta	53.24	
6	1	Peru	3:32.92	
6	1	Sebastián Arispe Silva	54.22	
6	1	Emmanuel Crescimbeni	52.36	
6	1	Manuel Alonso Yabar-Davila	53.39	
6	1	Sebastián Jahnsen Madico	52.95	
7	2	Uruguay	3:34.07	
7	2	Rodrigo Cáceres	53.14	
7	2	Nicolás Francia	53.83	
7	2	Joel Romeu	51.96	
7	2	Martín Kutscher	55.14	
8	8	Ecuador	3:40.72	
8	8	Mario Navas Navarro	54.96	
8	8	Ivan Enderica Ochoa	54.82	
8	8	Carlos Polit Carvajal	55.71	
8	8	Diego Zambrano Macias	55.23	
