= Swimming at the 2019 Pan American Games – Men's 4 × 200 metre freestyle relay =

Men's 4 × 200 metre freestyle relay at the 2019 Pan American Games
- Venue: Villa Deportiva Nacional, VIDENA
- Dates: August 9 (Final)
- Competitors: 28 from 7 nations
- Winning time: 7:10.66

Medalists
Gold medal	Luiz Altamir Melo; Fernando Scheffer; João de Lucca; Breno Correia	Brazil
Silver medal	Drew Kibler; Grant House; Samuel Pomajevich; Christopher Wieser	United States
Bronze medal	Jorge Iga; Long Gutiérrez; José Martínez; Ricardo Vargas	Mexico

The men's 4 × 200 metre freestyle relay competition of the swimming events at the 2019 Pan American Games was held on August 9, 2019 at the Villa Deportiva Nacional Videna cluster.

== Records ==
Prior to this competition, the existing world and Pan American Games records were as follows:

World record	United States (USA); Michael Phelps (1:44.49); Ricky Berens (1:44.13); David Walters (1:45.47); Ryan Lochte (1:44.46)	6:58.55	Rome, Italy	July 31, 2009
Pan American Games record	Brazil (BRA); Luiz Altamir Melo (1:48.39); João de Lucca (1:47.79); Thiago Pereira (1:48.14); Nicolas Oliveira (1:46.83)	7:11.15	Toronto, Canada	July 15, 2015

The following record was established during the competition:

Date	Event	Nation	Time	Record
August 9	Final	Brazil (BRA); Luiz Altamir Melo (1:48.10); Fernando Scheffer (1:46.36); João de Lucca (1:48.62); Breno Correia (1:47.58)	7:10.66	GR

== Results ==
KEY:	GR	Games record	NR	National record	PB	Personal best	SB	Seasonal best

=== Final ===
The final round was held on August 9.

Rank	Lane	Name	Nationality	Time	Notes
1st place, gold medalist(s)	5	Luiz Altamir Melo (1:48.10); Fernando Scheffer (1:46.36); João de Lucca (1:48.62); Breno Correia (1:47.58)	Brazil	7:10.66	GR
2nd place, silver medalist(s)	4	Drew Kibler (1:47.31); Grant House (1:48.31); Samuel Pomajevich (1:49.34); Christopher Wieser (1:49.86)	United States	7:14.82	
3rd place, bronze medalist(s)	3	Jorge Iga (1:47.92); Long Gutiérrez (1:47.90); José Martínez (1:51.29); Ricardo Vargas (1:52.32)	Mexico	7:19.43	NR
4	6	Cristian Quintero (1:48.94); Antoine Khazne (1:52.52); Andy Arteta Gomez (1:54.71); Rafael Dávila ( 1:51.25)	Venezuela	7:27.42	
5	2	Yeziel Morales (1:53.87); Christian Bayo (1:53.73); Miguel Ángel Cancel (1:53.67); Jarod Arroyo (1:54.86)	Puerto Rico	7:36.13	
6	7	Christian Martinelli (1:57.47); Gustavo Gutiérrez (1:56.02); Joaquín Vargas (1:52.56); Ricardo Espinosa (1:56.00)	Peru	7:42.05	
