= Swimming at the 2010 South American Games – Men's 4 × 200 metre freestyle relay =

The Men's 4 × 200 m freestyle relay event at the 2010 South American Games was held on March 27 at 18:35.

== Medalists ==
Gold	Silver	Bronze
Daniele Tirabassi; Crox Acuña; Alejandro Gómez; Christian Quintero; Venezuela	Thiago Pereira; Rodrigo Castro; Leonardo de Deus; Nicolas Oliveira; Brazil	Javier Molina; Mateo de Angulo; Juan David Pérez; Julio Galofre; Colombia

== Records ==
Standing records prior to the 2010 South American Games
World record	United States	6:58.55	Rome, Italy	31 July 2009
Competition Record	Venezuela	7:35.09	Buenos Aires, Argentina	16 November 2006
South American record	Brazil	7:09.71	Rome, Italy	31 July 2009

== Results ==
=== Final ===
Rank	Lane	Athlete	Result	Notes
1st place, gold medalist(s)	4	Venezuela	7:29.12	CR
1st place, gold medalist(s)	4	Daniele Tirabassi	1:53.52	CR
1st place, gold medalist(s)	4	Crox Acuña	1:50.71	CR
1st place, gold medalist(s)	4	Alejandro Gómez	1:53.51	CR
1st place, gold medalist(s)	4	Christian Quintero	1:51.38	CR
2nd place, silver medalist(s)	5	Brazil	7:29.92	
2nd place, silver medalist(s)	5	Thiago Pereira	1:51.43	
2nd place, silver medalist(s)	5	Rodrigo Castro	1:53.76	
2nd place, silver medalist(s)	5	Leonardo de Deus	1:53.40	
2nd place, silver medalist(s)	5	Nicolas Oliveira	1:51.33	
3rd place, bronze medalist(s)	3	Colombia	7:38.55	
3rd place, bronze medalist(s)	3	Javier Molina	1:57.17	
3rd place, bronze medalist(s)	3	Mateo de Angulo	1:52.40	
3rd place, bronze medalist(s)	3	Juan David Pérez	1:56.52	
3rd place, bronze medalist(s)	3	Julio Galofre	1:52.46	
4	6	Argentina	7:45.84	
4	6	Damian Roth	1:58.87	
4	6	Juan Martin Pereyra	1:56.27	
4	6	Esteban Paz	1:55.19	
4	6	Federico Grabich	1:55.51	
5	7	Paraguay	7:54.35	
5	7	Jose Enmanuel Martinez	1:56.18	
5	7	Favio Alessandro Segovia	1:58.80	
5	7	Charles Hockin	1:58.79	
5	7	Ben Hockin	2:00.58	
6	8	Ecuador	8:20.84	
6	8	Carlos Enrique Carvajal	2:02.04	
6	8	Ivan Marcelo Zavala	2:09.69	
6	8	Mario Oswaldo Navarro	2:02.50	
6	8	Ivan Alejandro Ochoa	2:06.61	
	2	Peru	DNS	
