= Patricia Maldonado =

Patricia Maldonado may refer to:

- Patricia Maldonado (singer) (born 1950), Chilean television presenter and singer
- Patricia Maldonado (writer) (born 1956), Argentine-Brazilian television writer
- Patricia Maldonado (swimmer) (born 1991), Venezuelan long-distance and open water swimmer
