= Swimming at the 2010 South American Games – Women's 5 km open water =

The women's 5 km open water event at the 2010 South American Games was held on March 23 at 10:10.

== Medalists ==
Gold	Silver	Bronze
Ana Marcela Cunha; Brazil; Andreina Pinto; Venezuela	no medal	Nataly Rosalta Calle; Ecuador

== Results ==
Rank	Athlete	Result
1st place, gold medalist(s)	Ana Marcela Cunha (BRA)	1:01:56.0
1st place, gold medalist(s)	Andreina Pinto (VEN)	1:01:56.0
3rd place, bronze medalist(s)	Nataly Rosalta Calle (ECU)	1:01:59.0
4	Antonella Bogarin (ARG)	1:02:00.0
5	Isabelle Longo (BRA)	1:02:13.0
6	Katia Paola Esquivel (ECU)	1:02:15.0
7	Marianela Mendoza (ARG)	1:02:27.0
8	Patricia Maldonado (VEN)	1:02:36.0
9	María Muñoz (COL)	1:04:32.0
10	Carolina Pfeifer (CHI)	1:07:10.0
11	Patricia Mariana San Martin (PER)	1:07:13.0
12	Diana Franco (COL)	1:07:21.0
13	Tania Tamara Sanchez (PAR)	1:14:16.0
14	Alexandra Rosel Blanco (BOL)	1:19:54.0
