= 2008 South American Swimming Championships =

XXXIX South American Swimming Championships
- Host city: São Paulo, Brazil
- Date: March 12–16, 2008

The 2008 South American Aquatics Championships, or Campeonato Sudamericano de Primera Fuerza de Deportes Acuáticos (as they were called in Spanish), were held March 12–16, 2008, in São Paulo, Brazil. The Championships were an event of CONSANAT, the South American Swimming Confederation, and featured competitions in diving, swimming, open water swimming, synchronized swimming and water polo.

The swimming competition at the Championships served as a qualifying event for the 2008 Olympics.

The water polo competition served as the South American qualifier for the UANA Cup: the Americas qualifier for the 2009 World Championships.

== Diving ==
=== Men's results ===
Event	Gold	Silver	Bronze
1 m springboard	Ramón Fumadó; Venezuela 375.80	César Castro; Brazil 373.60	Luis Villarroel; Venezuela 362.95
3 m springboard	César Castro; Brazil 448.60	Luis Villarroel; Venezuela 404.15	Juan Urán; Colombia 385.50
Platform	Juan Urán; Colombia 482.90	Hugo Parisi; Brazil 411.10	Sebastián Villa; Colombia 384.55
Synchronized; 3 m springboard	Luis Villarroel / Ramón Fumadó; Venezuela 399.45	Juan Urán / Víctor Ortega; Colombia 358.47	César Castro / Ubirajara Barbos; Brazil 347.55
Synchronized platform	Juan Urán / Víctor Ortega; Colombia 402.21	Hugo Parisi / Bira Barbosa; Brazil 340.02	Donato Neglia / Moises Abarla; Chile 214.74

=== Women's results ===
Event	Gold	Silver	Bronze
1 m springboard	Alejandra Fuentes; Venezuela 270.35	Juliana Veloso; Brazil 259.45	Diana Pineda; Colombia 232.25
3 m springboard	Alejandra Fuentes; Venezuela 306.60	Diana Pineda; Colombia 306.40	Juliana Veloso; Brazil 300.30
Platform	Juliana Veloso; Brazil 335.50	Kiara Buelva; Venezuela 281.65	Milena Canto Sae; Brazil 258.75
Synchronized; 3 m springboard	Juliana Veloso / Tammy Galera; Brazil 272.34	Kiara Buelvas / Yhessen Hernandez; Venezuela 252.69	Rafaella Suarez / Gabriela Sabando; Ecuador 241.95
Synchronized platform	Milena Canto Sae / Evelyn Winkler; Brazil 259.32	Diana Pineda / Laura Vasquez; Colombia 233.88	Rafaella Suarez / Gabriela Sabando; Ecuador 227.76

=== Point standings ===
Rank	Country	Points
1	Brazil	223
2	Colombia	203
3	Venezuela	172
4	Ecuador	61
5	Chile	52

== Swimming ==
Note: Competition was in a long course (50 m) pool.

=== Men's results ===
Event	Gold		Silver		Bronze	
50 m freestyle	Nicholas Santos; Brazil	22.72	Lucas Del Piccolo; Argentina	23.14	Camilo Becerra; Colombia	23.20
100 m freestyle	Fernando Souza da Silva; Brazil	50.60	Crox Acuña; Venezuela; Eduardo Deboni; Brazil	51.16		
200 m freestyle	Rodrigo Castro; Brazil	1:50.41; CR	Martin Kutscher; Uruguay	1:52.45	Crox Acuña; Venezuela	1:52.49
400 m freestyle	Ricardo Monasterio; Venezuela	3:56.50	Rodrigo Castro; Brazil	3:56.99	Armando Negreiros; Brazil	4:01.89
800 m freestyle	Ricardo Monasterio; Venezuela	8:12.04	Daniele Tirabasi; Venezuela	8:21.84	Luiz Rogerio Arapiraca; Brazil	8:23.03
1500 m freestyle	Ricardo Monasterio; Venezuela	15:43.07	Juan Martin Pereira; Argentina	15:57.42	Mateo de Angulo; Colombia	15:57.88
50 m backstroke	Guilherme Guido; Brazil	25.41	Eduardo German Otero; Argentina	26.59	Camilo Becerra; Colombia	27.43
100 m backstroke	Guilherme Guido; Brazil	55.54	Thiago Pereira; Brazil	57.27	Eduardo German Otero; Argentina	58.33
200 m backstroke	Lucas Salatta; Brazil	2:01.22	Thiago Pereira; Brazil	2:05.70	Luciano Sales Rubio; Argentina	2:08.10
50 m breaststroke	Felipe Lima; Brazil	28.46	Felipe Silva; Brazil	28.74	Walter Archiprete; Argentina	29.28
100 m breaststroke	Henrique Barbosa; Brazil	1:01.44; CR SAR	Felipe Lima; Brazil	1:01.89	Walter Archiprete; Argentina	1:05.44
200 m breaststroke	Henrique Barbosa; Brazil	2:18.14	Bastian Nordenflytch; Chile	2:24.46	Diego Bonilla; Colombia	2:24.78
50 m butterfly	Nicholas Santos; Brazil	23.88; CR	Candido da Silva; Brazil	24.72	Camilo Becerra; Colombia	24.88
100 m butterfly	Fernando Souza da Silva; Brazil	54.61	Camilo Becerra; Colombia	54.76	Gordon Touw Ngie Tjouw; Suriname	54.80
200 m butterfly	Andres José Gonzalez; Argentina	2:01.77	Julio Galofre; Colombia	2:01.95	Alexis Marquez; Venezuela	2:02.62
200 m individual medley	Thiago Pereira; Brazil	2:05.22	Tales Rocha Cerdeira; Brazil	2:06.16	Diego Bonilla; Colombia	2:08.05
400 m individual medley	Thiago Pereira; Brazil	4:27.58	Lucas Salatta; Brazil	4:36.39	Benjamin Guzmán; Chile	4:37.29
400 m freestyle relay	Brazil; Nicholas Santos, Fernando Souza da Silva, Eduardo Deboni, Tales Rocha Cerdeira	3:24.47	Uruguay; Francisco Picasso, José Gabriel Álvez, Paul Kutscher, Martin Kutscher	3:25.40	Argentina; Lucas del Piccolo, Eduardo German Otero, Sergio Ferreira, Damian Roth	3:32.05
800 m freestyle relay	Venezuela; Daniel Tirabasi, Juan Francisco Morales, Jesus Casanova, Crox Acuña	7:33.30; CR	Brazil; Lucas Salatta, Armando Negreiros, Thiago Pereira, Rodrigo Castro	7:45.06	Argentina; Agustín Fiorilli, Damian Roth, Freddy Renzo Zschach, Juan Martín Pereira	7:46.24
400 m medley relay	Brazil; Guilherme Guido, Henrique Barbosa, Lucas Salatta, Eduardo Deboni	3:43.87	Argentina; Eduardo German Otero, Sergio Ferreira, Gustavo Daniel Paschetta, Damian Roth	3:49.41	Uruguay; Nicolas Francia, Martin Melconiam, Martin Kutscher, Paul Kutscher	3:50.00

=== Women's results ===
Event	Gold		Silver		Bronze	
50 m freestyle	Flavia Delaroli-Cazziolato; Brazil	25.25; CR	Ximena Vilar; Venezuela	26.51	Yamilé Bahamonde; Ecuador; Julyana Bassi Kury; Brazil	26.64
100 m freestyle	Tatiana Lemos; Brazil	56.06	Flavia Delaroli-Cazziolato; Brazil	56.16	Carolina Colorado Henao; Colombia	57.49
200 m freestyle	Monique Ferreira; Brazil	2:00.62	Tatiana Lemos; Brazil	2:02.26	Cecilia Elizabeth Biagioli; Argentina	2:04.47
400 m freestyle	Monique Ferreira; Brazil	4:13.77	Kristel Köbrich; Chile	4:17.94	Cecilia Elizabeth Biagioli; Argentina	4:19.81
800 m freestyle	Kristel Köbrich; Chile	8:51.90	Cecilia Elizabeth Biagioli; Argentina	8:59.89	Darneyis Orozco; Venezuela	9:06.17
1500 m freestyle	Kristel Köbrich; Chile	16:38.57	Sofia Osaba; Argentina	17:29.64	Darneyis Orozco; Venezuela	17:35.73
50 m backstroke	Fabíola Molina; Brazil	29.11	Etiene Medeiros; Brazil	29.91	Carolina Colorado Henao; Colombia	30.62
100 m backstroke	Fabíola Molina; Brazil	1:01.93	Carolina Colorado Henao; Colombia	1:04.04	Juanita Barreto; Colombia	1:05.26
200 m backstroke	Erin Volcán; Venezuela	2:17.47; CR	Eliana Cassini; Argentina	2:22.16	Julyana Bassi Kury; Brazil	2:23.38
50 m breaststroke	Valeria Silva Merea; Peru	32.53; CR, NR	Javiera Salcedo; Argentina	33.22	Liliana Guiscardo; Argentina	33.27
100 m breaststroke	Valeria Silva Merea; Peru	1:12.46	Javiera Salcedo; Argentina	1:12.78	Tatiane Mayumi Sakemi; Brazil	1:13.39
200 m breaststroke	Tatiane Mayumi Sakemi; Brazil	2:38.49	Carolina Hurga Mussi; Brazil	2:39.70	Nora Miro Quesada Woll; Peru	2:40.61
50 m butterfly	Gabriella Silva; Brazil	27.49	Carolina Colorado Henao; Colombia	28.22	Yamile Bahamonde; Ecuador	28.44
100 m butterfly	Gabriella Silva; Brazil	1:00.74	Daiene Marçal Dias; Brazil	1:01.77	Carolina Colorado Henao; Colombia	1:01.96
200 m butterfly	Joanna Maranhão; Brazil	2:13.41; CR	Georgina Bardach; Argentina	2:18.21	Daiene Marçal Dias; Brazil	2:19.02
200 m individual medley	Joanna Maranhão; Brazil	2:17.10	Georgina Bardach; Argentina	2:23.08	Erin Volcán; Venezuela	2:23.81
400 m individual medley	Joanna Maranhão; Brazil	4:49.62	Georgina Bardach; Argentina	4:55.59	Virginia Bardach; Argentina	5:06.27
400 m freestyle relay	Brazil; Julyaana Bassi Kury, Etiene Medeiros, Monique Ferreira, Tatiana Lemos Barbosa	3:49.21	Argentina; Nadia Soledad Colovini, Manuela Morano, Ariadna Ghirard, Cecilia Elizabeth Biagioli	3:55.02	Venezuela; Ximena Vilar, Jesserick Pinto, Jenifer Marquez, Erin Volcán	3:56.50
800 m freestyle relay	Brazil; Manuela Lyrio, Tatiana Lemos Barbosa, Joanna Maranhão, Monique Ferreira	8:23.77	Argentina; Nadia Soledad Colovini, Adriadna Ghirard, Georgina Bardach, Cecilia Elizabeth Biagioli		Venezuela; Jenifer Marquez, Darneyis Orozco, Patricia Maldonado, Erin Volcán	
400 m medley relay	Brazil; Fabíola Molina, Tatiane Mayumi Sakemi, Gabriella Silva, Tatiana Lemos Barbosa	4:11.53; CR SAR	Venezuela; Erin Volcán, Gloria González, Elimar Barrios, Ximena Vilar	4:23.39	Argentina; Eliana Cassini, Javiera Salcedo, Florencia Ghione, Nadia Soledad Colovini	4:25.01

=== Records ===
10 South American Records were set in:

- Men's 100 m backstroke: 54.67, Guilherme Guido, Brazil
- Men's 100 m breaststroke: 1:01.44, Henrique Barbosa, Brazil
- Women's 100 m freestyle: 55.73, Tatiana Lemos, Brazil
- Women's 200 m freestyle: 2:00.62, Monique Ferreira, Brazil
- Women's 50 m backstroke: 28.45, Fabíola Molina, Brazil
- Women's 100 m backstroke: 1:01.40, Fabíola Molina, Brazil
- Women's 50 m breaststroke: 32.53, Valéria Merea, Peru
- Women's 50 m butterfly: 27.48, Gabriella Silva, Brazil
- Women's 100 m butterfly: 59.79, Gabriella Silva, Brazil
- Women's 400 m medley relay: 4:11.53, Brazil (Molina, Sakemi, Silva, Lemos)

Additionally, 8 Championship Records (CRs) were set in:

- Men's 200 m freestyle: 1:50.41, Rodrigo Castro, Brazil
- Men's 50 m backstroke: 25.19, Guilherme Guido, Brazil
- Men's 50 m breaststroke: 28.40, Felipe Lima, Brazil
- Men's 50 m butterfly: 23.88, Nicholas Santos, Brazil
- Men's 400 m individual medley: 4:17.64, Thiago Pereira, Brazil
- Men's 800 m freestyle relay: 7:33.30, Venezuela
- Women's 50 m freestyle: 25.25, Flávia Delaroli Cazziolato, Brazil
- Women's 400 m freestyle: 4:13.77, Monique Ferreira, Brazil

== Open water swimming ==
Note: Competition dates were March 7 (5 km) and March 9 (10 km).

=== Men's results ===
Event	Gold	Silver	Bronze
5 km	Luiz Lima; Brazil 57:34.85	Roberto Penailillo; Chile 57:40.28	Carlos Pavão; Brazil 57:41.04
10 km	Allan do Carmo; Brazil 2:02:19	Roberto Penailillo; Chile 2:02:22	Marcelo Romanelli; Brazil 2:02:25

=== Women's results ===
Event	Gold	Silver	Bronze
5 km	Kristel Köbrich; Chile 1:03:15	Ana Marcela Cunha; Brazil 1:03:16	Maria de Penha Cruz; Brazil 1:03:53
10 km	Kristel Köbrich; Chile 2:02:33	Ana Marcela Cunha; Brazil 2:06:22	Andreína Pinto; Venezuela 2:06:43

=== Team results ===
Place	Country	Time (hours/minutes/seconds)
1	Brazil	9h 09m 38s
2	Venezuela	9h 14m 57s
3	Chile	9h 20m 31s
4	Argentina	9h 27m 06s
5	Ecuador	9h 35m 25s

Note: Based on fastest total time of compiled 3 fastest times (male and female) per country in both events.

== Synchronized swimming ==
=== Results ===
Event	Gold	Silver	Bronze
Solo	Giovana Stephan; Brazil; 87.498 (T=42.915 / F=44.583)	Jennifer Cerquera; Colombia; 83.498 (T=40.665 / F=42.833)	Julieta Díaz; Argentina; 81.915 (T=40.250 / F=41.666)
Duet	Lara Teixeira / Nayara Figueira; Giovana Stephan (r); Brazil; 89.748 (T=44.499 / F=45.249)	Anna Soto / Mary Soto; Venezuela; 84.665 (T=41.416 / F=43.249)	Jennifer Cerquera / Ingrid Cubillos; Stefanie Garcia (r); Colombia; 82.332 (T=40.333 / F=41.999)
Team	Brazil; Maria Bruno, Michelle Frota, Joseane Martins, Lorena Molinos, Pamela Nogueira, Gláucia Souza, Giovana Stephan, Camila Ururay (r): Nayara Figueira and Lara Teixeira; 87.999 (T=43.583 / F=44.416)	Colombia; Ailin Alegria, Asly Alegria, Paula Arcila, Jennifer Cerquera, Ingrid Cubillos, Luana Prato, Mónica Arango, Marilza Valencia, (r): Stefanie Garcia and Maria Reyna; 84.332 (T=41.749 / F=42.583)	Venezuela; Rosa Maria Avila, Ariana Bencomo, Paula Fernandez, Geraldine Narvaez, Adriana Scotton, Fredmary Zambrano (r): Darlin Hernandez and Amanda Mendez; 82.415 (T=40.999 / F=41.416)

T=Technical program score; F=Free program score (each weights equally)

=== Point standings ===
Rank	Country	Solo	Duet	Team	Total
1	Brazil	24	36	72	132
2	Colombia	22	30	66	118
3	Venezuela	18	33	60	111
4	Argentina	20	27	54	101
5	Aruba*	16	-	-	16

*Aruba is not a normal CONSANAT member, and only competed in the synchro solo competition at these Championships.

== Water polo ==
Game winners are italicized.

=== Men's tournament ===
Round	Teams	Score
Day 5 games	Colombia v. Argentina	6-5
	Venezuela v. Brazil	5-14
	Venezuela v. Argentina	6-10
	Colombia v. Brazil	1-13
Day 6 games	Colombia v. Venezuela	9-11
	Brazil v. Argentina	11-6
Semifinals		
	Venezuela v. Argentina	6-8
	Brazil v. Colombia	16-6
Finals		
Bronze medal	Argentina v. Colombia	7-8
Gold medal	Brazil v. Venezuela	15-4

=== Women's tournament ===
Round	Teams	Score
Day 4 games	Venezuela v. Chile	23-1
	Brazil v. Argentina	13-4
Day 5 games	Venezuela v. Argentina	10-4
	Brazil v. Chile	27-3
Day 6 games	Chile v. Argentina	0-17
	Brazil v. Venezuela	13-6
Semifinals		
	Venezuela v. Argentina	8-10
	Brazil v. Chile	25-4
Finals		
Bronze medal	Venezuela v. Chile	28-0
Gold medal	Brazil v. Argentina	11-3

=== Final standings ===
Event	Gold	Silver	Bronze	4th
Men	Brazil	Venezuela	Colombia	Argentina
Women	Brazil	Argentina	Venezuela	Chile

== Overall medals table ==
Rank	Nation	Gold	Silver	Bronze	Total
1	Brazil (BRA)	42	21	12	75
2	Venezuela (VEN)	9	9	12	30
3	Chile (CHI)	4	4	2	10
4	Colombia (COL)	2	10	15	27
5	Peru (PER)	2	0	1	3
6	Argentina (ARG)	1	15	12	28
7	Uruguay (URU)	0	2	1	3
8	Ecuador (ECU)	0	0	4	4
9	Suriname (SUR)	0	0	1	1
Totals (9 entries)		60	61	60	181
