= Swimming at the 2019 Pan American Games – Men's 200 metre butterfly =

Men's 200 metre butterfly at the 2019 Pan American Games
- Venue: Villa Deportiva Nacional, VIDENA
- Dates: August 6 (preliminaries and finals)
- Competitors: 21 from 17 nations

Medalists
Gold medal	Leonardo de Deus	Brazil
Silver medal	Samuel Pomajevich	United States
Bronze medal	Jonathan Gómez	Colombia

The men's 200 metre butterfly competition of the swimming events at the 2019 Pan American Games are scheduled to be held August 6th, 2019 at the Villa Deportiva Nacional Videna cluster.

== Records ==
Prior to this competition, the existing world and Pan American Games records were as follows:

World record	Kristóf Milák (HUN)	1:50.73	Gwangju, South Korea	July 24, 2019
Pan American Games record	Leonardo de Deus (BRA)	1:55.01	Toronto, Canada	July 14, 2015

== Results ==
KEY:	q	Fastest non-qualifiers	Q	Qualified	GR	Games record	NR	National record	PB	Personal best	SB	Seasonal best

=== Heats ===
The first round was held on August 6.

Rank	Heat	Lane	Name	Nationality	Time	Notes
1	2	5	Jonathan Gómez	Colombia	1:57.24	QA
2	3	5	Samuel Pomajevich	United States	1:58.19	QA
3	1	4	Luiz Altamir Melo	Brazil	1:58.76	QA
4	2	4	Tom Shields	United States	1:58.82	QA
5	3	4	Leonardo de Deus	Brazil	2:00.00	QA
6	1	5	Héctor Ruvalcaba	Mexico	2:00.31	QA
7	2	6	Nicolás Deferrari	Argentina	2:00.37	QA
8	3	6	José Martínez Gómez	Mexico	2:00.73	QA
9	1	3	David Arias	Colombia	2:00.93	QB
10	3	2	Gustavo Gutierrez Lozano	Peru	2:01.58	QB
11	3	3	Luis Vega Torres	Cuba	2:01.74	QB
12	1	6	Jarod Arroyo	Puerto Rico	2:01.95	QB
13	2	7	Gabriel Araya	Chile	2:02.40	QB
14	2	3	Michael Gunning	Jamaica	2:02.73	QB
15	2	2	Luis Vilchez Mercado	Peru	2:03.04	QB
16	1	7	Carlos Vasquez Moreno	Honduras	2:03.37	QB
17	3	1	Kael Yorke	Trinidad and Tobago	2:06.61	
18	1	2	Andy Arteta Gomez	Venezuela	2:07.02	
19	3	7	Bryan Alvaréz	Costa Rica	2:07.23	
20	2	1	Matthew Mays	Virgin Islands	2:07.41	
21	1	1	John Michael Bodden	Cayman Islands	2:08.22	

=== Final B ===
The B final was also held on August 6.

Rank	Lane	Name	Nationality	Time	Notes
9	3	Luis Vega Torres	Cuba	2:00.22	
10	6	Jarod Arroyo	Puerto Rico	2:01.27	
11	5	Gustavo Gutierrez Lozano	Peru	2:01.40	
12	7	Michael Gunning	Jamaica	2:01.68	
13	2	Gabriel Araya	Chile	2:02.73	
14	8	Carlos Vasquez Moreno	Honduras	2:02.74	
15	1	Luis Vilchez Mercado	Peru	2:02.78	
16	4	David Arias	Colombia	2:03.95	

=== Final A ===
The A final was also held on August 6.

Rank	Lane	Name	Nationality	Time	Notes
1st place, gold medalist(s)	2	Leonardo de Deus	Brazil	1:55.86	
2nd place, silver medalist(s)	5	Samuel Pomajevich	United States	1:57.35	
3rd place, bronze medalist(s)	4	Jonathan Gómez	Colombia	1:57.75	
4	3	Luiz Altamir Melo	Brazil	1:57.78	
5	8	José Martínez Gómez	Mexico	1:59.23	
6	7	Héctor Ruvalcaba	Mexico	2:00.69	
7	1	Nicolás Deferrari	Argentina	2:01.84	
8	6	Tom Shields	United States	2:06.65	
