= Ramón Fumadó =

Venezuelan diver (born 1981)

Personal information
- Born: December 28, 1981 (age 44)
Medal record
Men's diving
Representing Venezuela
South American Championships
Gold medal – first place	2008 São Paulo	1m Springboard
Gold medal – first place	2008 São Paulo	Springboard Synchro

Ramón Antonio Fumadó Rodríguez (born December 28, 1981, in Caracas, Distrito Capital) is a male diver from Venezuela, who competed in three consecutive Summer Olympics for his native country, starting in 2000. He claimed two gold medals at the 2008 South American Swimming Championships in São Paulo.
