= Jonathan Gómez (swimmer) =

Colombian swimmer (born 1996)

Personal information
- Full name: Jonathan David Gómez Noriega
- Nationality: Colombia
- Born: 19 April 1996 (age 30) Cali, Colombia
- Height: 185 cm (6 ft 1 in)
- Weight: 75 kg (165 lb)

Sport
- Sport: Swimming
- Strokes: Butterfly; Individual medley
- College team: Southern Methodist University
Medal record
Representing Colombia
Men's swimming
Event	1st	2nd	3rd
Pan American Games	0	0	1
CAC Games	1	0	0
South American Championships	1	0	1
Bolivarian Games	2	2	0
Total	4	2	2
Pan American Games
Bronze medal – third place	2019 Lima	200 m butterfly
Central American and Caribbean Games
Gold medal – first place	2018 Barranquilla	200 m butterfly
South American Championships
Gold medal – first place	2018 Trujillo	200 m butterfly
Bronze medal – third place	2018 Trujillo	4×200 m freestyle
Bolivarian Games
Gold medal – first place	2017 Santa Marta	200 m butterfly
Gold medal – first place	2017 Santa Marta	400 m medley
Silver medal – second place	2017 Santa Marta	200 m medley
Silver medal – second place	2017 Santa Marta	4×200 m freestyle

Jonathan David Gómez-Noriega (born 19 April 1996) is a Colombian swimmer who competed at the 2016 Summer Olympics. Gomez swims for Southern Methodist University in Dallas, Texas where he holds the school's record in 3 events. Gomez placed 15th at the 2016 Rio Olympics and ranked 14th in the world at the 2016 Short Course World Championships in Windsor, Canada establishing a new Colombian National Record. He won the 200 butterfly at the 2016 Arena Pro Swim Series at Charlotte, North Carolina beating 2012 Olympic Gold Medalist Tyler Clary.

== Biography ==
Gómez started swimming at the age of 7 due to asthma. At the age of 13, his family moved from Colombia to the United States. He studies Economics and International Business and lives in Jersey City, New Jersey. His sister is Valentina Gómez, a far-right U.S. politician.

He served as an aide to Jersey City Mayor Steven Fulop and was also a member of the city's LGBTQ+ Task Force. Following a statement by the Hudson Pride Center condemning his financial support of his sister's campaign, Gómez-Noriega resigned from the Task Force on August 5, 2024, stating publicly that he did not support his sister's hateful remarks. Nevertheless, he was dismissed as an aide on the same day by the Mayor. Kim Wallace-Scalcione, Fulop's press secretary, commented: “The Fulop Administration has zero tolerance for bigotry and racism, and Mayor Fulop’s record reflects this commitment.”

== Career ==
- 2013 World Junior Championships - Dubai United Arab Emirates 14th place - 200 meter butterfly
- 2014 Youth Olympic Games in Nanjing-China placed 8th in the world
- 2014 Speedo Sectional Championships Winner - Orlando, Buffalo & College Station)
- 2015 Arena Pro Swim Series Champion in the 200 meter butterfly
- 2016 Caribbean Island Swimming Championships in the Bahamas - Champion 200 meter butterfly
- 2016 Short Course World Championships in Canada
- 2017 World Championships in Budapest, Hungary placed 14th in the world
- 2017 World Cup - Moscow, Russia - placed 6th
- 2017 World Cup - Berlin, Germany - placed 4th
- 2017 World Cup - Netherlands - placed 5th
- 2017 Bolivarian Games Champion - 200 meter butterfly & 400 IM
