= Valeria Silva =

Peruvian swimmer

Personal information
- Full name: Valeria Silva Merea
- National team: Peru
- Born: 4 September 1985 (age 40) Lima, Peru
- Height: 1.83 m (6 ft 0 in)
- Weight: 61 kg (134 lb)

Sport
- Sport: Swimming
- Strokes: Breaststroke
- Club: Club Regatas de Lima
- College team: University of Michigan (U.S.)
- Coach: Jon Urbanchek (U.S.)
Medal record
Women's swimming
Representing Peru
South American Games
| Silver medal – second place | 2002 Belém | 200 m backstroke |
| Silver medal – second place | 2002 Belém | 4x100 m medley |
| Bronze medal – third place | 2002 Belém | 100 m breaststroke |
South American Championships
| Gold medal – first place | 2004 Maldonado | 50 m breaststroke |
| Gold medal – first place | 2008 São Paulo | 50 m breaststroke |
| Gold medal – first place | 2008 São Paulo | 100 m breaststroke |
| Gold medal – first place | 2008 São Paulo | 200 m breaststroke |

Valeria Silva Merea (born September 4, 1985) is a Peruvian swimmer/surgeon, who specialized in breaststroke events. She is a three-time national record holder for the breaststroke events, a two-time Olympic swimmer, and a multiple-time gold medalist at the 2008 South American Swimming Championships in São Paulo, Brazil.

== Biography ==
Silva hailed from a sporting family in Lima, Peru. Her parents Javier and Luisa Silva Merea played for the national volleyball teams. Coincidentally, her mother competed at the 1976 Summer Olympics in Montreal, where she and her teammates placed in the quarterfinal round of the women's volleyball tournament. Her brother Matías, on the other hand, was a professional tennis player, and represented his nation in the Davis Cup. Silva started swimming at the age of five, and began training at Club Regatas de Lima, a local swimming club in Peru, a few years later. She attended high school at Colegio Peruano Aleman Alexander von Humboldt in Lima, and competed for the swimming team in numerous national and continental junior championships. After graduating from high school, Silva was awarded a scholarship to train in Australia for a year, before she decided to move to the United States in 2004.

== Academic and sporting career ==
Silva attended the University of Michigan in Ann Arbor, Michigan, where she studied medicine, with a degree in neurology, psychology, and cognitive science. In the same year, she became a varsity player and member of the university's swimming and diving team, and eventually achieved, with numerous academic honors and sports awards, by participating in the collegiate championships. She was also admitted to the Peru national swimming team, and selected as one of the twelve athletes to represent the nation at the 2004 Summer Olympics in Athens, after winning the South American Championships. Silva swam in the second heat of the women's 100 m breaststroke, where she placed fifth and thirty-seventh overall in 1:13.52.

Silva emerged as one of the leading breaststrokers in the swimming team during her first season at the university. She achieved top-ten finishes in the breaststroke events at the Indiana Invitational, when she placed fourth overall in the 100 m breaststroke, with her personal best time of 1:05.05, and ninth in the 200 m breaststroke, at 2:21.42. Silva took two years off to further continue her medicine studies, and train for the swimming team. In 2007, she returned to the international stage, and competed at the 2007 Pan American Games in Rio de Janeiro, Brazil, where she placed in the semi-final rounds for the breaststroke events. She also qualified for the 2007 FINA World Championships in Melbourne, where she earned top-thirty victories in all of her breaststroke events.

In 2008, Silva made numerous achievements both in her swimming career and academic endeavors. She fulfilled her academic recognition in the university, when she was chosen as finalist for the Walter Byers Scholarship, the NCAA's highest academic award. Although she missed several classes because of her sporting competition, Silva did not hinder her academic studies, and eventually, received a degree in medicine, when she graduated at the University of Michigan. She also qualified for the 2008 South American Swimming Championships in São Paulo, Brazil, and won gold medals for the breaststroke events. Furthermore, Silva set both a national and a continental record in the women's 50 m breaststroke, with an impressive time of 32.53 seconds.

Silva was selected as the only female swimmer and one of thirteen athletes to represent Peru at the 2008 Summer Olympics in Beijing. She finally competed again in the women's 100 m breaststroke, and swam in the second heat. Silva finished in second place in the heats, and thirty-eighth overall, with a personal best time of 1:11.64. Although she failed to advance into the later rounds, she set another national record for her respective event.

== Medicine career ==
After graduating from University, Silva attended the College of Physicians and Surgeons at Columbia University in New York City, New York, and received her medical degree in 2012. She completed her medical fellowship in otolaryngology (head and neck surgery) at Cleveland Clinic Hospital. Silva is now an attending otolaryngologist in Head and Neck Surgery at Memorial Sloan Kettering Cancer Center.
