= Leopoldo Andara =

Venezuelan swimmer (born 1986)

Personal information
- Born: June 27, 1986 (age 40) Miranda, Venezuela

Sport
- Sport: Swimming
Medal record
Representing Venezuela
Central American and Caribbean Games
| Gold medal – first place | 2010 Mayagüez | 4x100m medley relay |
South American Games
| Silver medal – second place | 2002 Belem | 200m individual medley |
| Silver medal – second place | 2002 Belem | 400m individual medley |
| Silver medal – second place | 2002 Belem | 4x100m medley relay |
| Silver medal – second place | 2010 Medellin | 4x100m medley relay |
| Bronze medal – third place | 2002 Belem | 200m breaststroke |
| Bronze medal – third place | 2006 Buenos Aires | 400m individual medley |
| Bronze medal – third place | 2006 Buenos Aires | 4x100m medley relay |

Leopoldo Andara (born 27 June 1986) is a Venezuelan swimmer. He participated at the 2008 Summer Olympics.

== Early life and education ==
Leopoldo was born on 27 June 1986 in Miranda, Venezuela. He moved to Florida, but competed in the 2008 Summer Olympics as a Venezuelan native. He received a Bachelor of Arts in Psychology from Florida International University in 2010. In 2014, he received a Master’s Degree in Mental Health Counseling from Nova Southeastern University.

== International and national competitions ==
=== 2022 ===
- Central American and Caribbean Games: Won gold medals in the 100-meter breaststroke and 200-meter breaststroke, and a silver medal in the 4x100-meter medley relay.
- South American Games: Won gold medals in the 100-meter breaststroke and 200-meter breaststroke, and a silver medal in the 4x100-meter medley relay.

=== 2021 ===
- Pan American Games: Won a bronze medal in the 100-meter breaststroke.

=== 2011 ===
- Venezuela national team member Pan-American Games Guadalajara Mexico.

=== 2010 ===
- 1st Place Medley Relay South American Games Medellin Colombia.
- 2nd Place 200 meters Individual Medley South American Games Medellin Colombia.
- 1st Place Medley Relay Central American Games Puerto Rico.
- 3rd Place 200 meters Breaststroke Central American Games Puerto Rico.
- Venezuela National Team Member for FINA World Swimming Championships (25M) 2010 Dubai.
- Venezuela National Champion in 100-200 Breaststroke, and 200-400 Individual Medley.

=== 2009 ===
- 9th Place FINA World Cup Swimming World Cup 400 meters Individual Medley.
- Venezuelan National Record in 200–400 meters Individual Medley.
- Venezuelan National Champion in 100-200 Breaststroke, and 200-400 Individual Medley.

=== 2008 ===
- National Team Member at Beijing Olympics, participant in 200 meters Breaststroke and 200 meters Individual Medley.
- 2nd Place 200 meters Individual Medley Bahamas International Championship.
- 2nd Place 100 meters Breaststroke Bahamas International Championship.
- 1st Place 200 meters Breaststroke Bahamas International Championship.
- Venezuelan National Champion in 100-200 Breaststroke, and 200-400 Individual Medley.

=== 2007 ===
- 8th Place 200 yards Butterfly SEC's Championship.
- 8th Place 200 meters Breaststroke Pan-American Games Rio, Brazil.
- 9th Place 200 meters Individual Medley Pan-American Games Rio, Brazil.
- Venezuelan National Champion in 100-200 Breaststroke, and 200-400 Individual Medley.

=== 2006 ===
- NJCAA Champion in 200 yards Butterfly, and 200-400 yards Individual Medley.
- NJCAA MVP and National record in 200 yards Butterfly.
- 3rd Place 200 meters Breaststroke Central American Games Cartagena, Colombia.
- 3rd Place 200 meters Individual Medley South American Championship Argentina.
- Venezuelan National Champion in 100-200 Breaststroke, 200-400 Individual Medley, and 200 Butterfly.

=== 2005 ===
- NJCAA Champion in 200 yards Butterfly, and 200-400 yards Individual Medley.
- NJCAA MVP.
- 2nd Place 200 meters Individual Medley Bolivarian Games Colombia.
- 2nd Place 200 meters Breaststroke Bolivarian Games Colombia.
- Venezuelan National Champion in 100-200 Breaststroke, 200-400 Individual Medley, and 200 Butterfly.

=== 2004 ===
- 2nd Place 200 meters Breaststroke South American Games Montevideo, Uruguay.
- Venezuela National Team Member for FINA World Swimming Championships (25M) Indianapolis.
- Venezuelan National Champion in 200 Breaststroke, 200-400 Individual Medley, and 200 Butterfly.

=== 2003 ===
- 1st Place 400 meters Individual Medley Central American Championship Mexico City, Mexico .
- 3rd Place 100 meters Breaststroke Central American Championship Mexico City, Mexico.
- 2nd Place 200 meters Breaststroke Central American Championship Mexico City, Mexico.
- Venezuelan National Champion in 100-200 Breaststroke, 200-400 Individual Medley, and 200 Butterfly.

=== 2002 ===
- 2nd Place 200 meters Breaststroke South American Championship Belem, Brazil.
- 2nd Place 200 meters Individual Medley South American Championship Belem, Brazil.
- 2nd Place 400 meters Individual Medley South American Championship Belem, Brazil.
- Venezuelan National Champion in 100-200 Breaststroke, 200-400 Individual Medley, and 200 Butterfly.

=== 2001 ===
- 1st Place 400 meters Individual Medley Central American Championship Dominican Republic.
- 1st Place 200 meters Breaststroke Central American Championship Dominican Republic.
- 1st Place 200 meters Individual Medley Central American Championship Dominican Republic.
- 1st Place 200 meters Butterfly Central American Championship Dominican Republic.
- 2nd Place 200 meters Individual Medley South American Championship Medellin, Colombia.
- 2nd Place 200 meters Butterfly South American Championship Medellin Colombia.
- 2nd Place 100 meters Breaststroke South American Championship Medellin Colombia.
- Venezuelan National Champion in 100-200 Breaststroke, 200-400 Individual Medley.

=== 2000 ===
- Venezuelan National Champion in 100-200 Breaststroke, 200-400 Individual Medley
