= Swimming at the 2007 Pan American Games – Men's 4 × 100 metre freestyle relay =

The Men's 4x100m Freestyle Relay event at the 2007 Pan American Games occurred at the Maria Lenk Aquatic Park in Rio de Janeiro, Brazil, with the final being swum on July 20.

== Medalists ==
Gold	Fernando Silva; Eduardo Deboni; Nicolas Oliveira; César Cielo; Brazil
Silver	Gabe Woodward; Ricky Berens; Dale Rogers; Andy Grant; United States
Bronze	Albert Subirats; Octavio Alesi; Luis Rojas; Crox Acuña; Venezuela

== Results ==
=== Finals ===
Place	Country	Swimmers	Time	Note
1	Brazil	Fernando Silva (49.72); Eduardo Deboni (49.15); Nicolas Oliveira (48.85); César Cielo (48.18)	3:15.90	CR, SA
2	United States	Gabe Woodward (50.68); Ricky Berens (48.05); Dale Rogers (49.28); Andy Grant (48.65)	3:16.66	
3	Venezuela	Albert Subirats (49.71); Octavio Alesi (49.93); Luis Rojas (49.52); Crox Acuña (49.81)	3:18.97	
4	Canada	Chad Hankewich (50.40); Richard Hortness (50.33); Matthew Hawes (50.45); Adam Sioui (49.28)	3:20.46	
5	Uruguay	Gabriel Melconian (50.72); Paul Kutscher (50.20); Martín Kutscher (49.78); Francisco Picasso (50.36)	3:21.06	NR
6	Colombia	Camilo Becerra (51.28); Omar Pinzón (51.99); Carlos Viveros (53.66); Julio Galofre (52.16)	3:29.90	
7	Mexico	Juan Alberto Yeh (52.23); Enrique Bayata (53.78); Iván de Jesús López (52.96); Amauri Rodríguez (51.47)	3:30.44	
8	Barbados	Terrence Haynes (51.65); Bradley Ally (55.98); Andrei Cross (53.79); Shawn Clarke (51.23)	3:32.65	

=== Preliminaries ===
The heats was held on July 19.

Place	Country	Swimmers	Time	Note
1	United States	Gary Hall, Jr. (50.48); Alex Righi (49.76); Andy Grant (49.07); Ricky Berens (48.88)	3:18.19	Q
2	Brazil	Fernando Silva (49.95); Nicholas Santos (50.59); Thiago Pereira (49.89); Eduardo Deboni (49.22)	3:19.65	Q
3	Uruguay	Gabriel Melconian (51.45); Paul Kutscher (50.25); Martín Kutscher (49.70); Francisco Picasso (49.94)	3:21.34	Q
4	Canada	Pascal Wollach (51.38); Thomas Sacco (51.12); Matthew Hawes (50.50); Richard Hortness (50.43)	3:23.43	Q
5	Venezuela	Jesus Casanova (51.96); Octavio Alesi (52.05); Luis Rojas (50.67); Reymer Vezga (52.11)	3:26.79	Q
6	Colombia	Camilo Becerra (51.34); Omar Pinzón (53.54); Julio Galofre (52.93); Carlos Viveros (53.48)	3:31.29	Q
6	Barbados	Shawn Clarke (51.86); Bradley Ally (52.83); Andrei Cross (53.38); Terrence Haynes (53.22)	3:31.29	Q
8	Mexico	Juan Alberto Yeh (52.51); Amauri Rodríguez (52.43); Enrique Bayata (53.62); Iván de Jesús López (53.86)	3:32.42	Q
9	Virgin Islands	Josh Laban (52.84); Kieran Locke (53.17); Morgan Locke (53.70); Kevin Hensley (55.35)	3:35.06	
10	Honduras	Juan Lagos (56.26); Javier Hernández (59.83); Roy Barahona (1:00.19); Horacio Carcamo (56.76)	3:53.04	
