= Samuel Pomajevich =

American swimmer (born 1998)

Sam Pomajevich
Personal information
- Nickname: Sam
- National team: United States
- Born: October 12, 1998 (age 28) Arlington, Virginia, U.S.
- Education: UT Austin (2021 Engineering)
- Height: 6 ft 2 in (188 cm)

Sport
- Sport: Swimming
- Events: 100, 200 butterfly Freestyle relay
- Strokes: Butterfly, Freestyle
- Club: Nation's Capital Swim Club; Washington, D.C.
- College team: University of Texas at Austin
- Coach: Eddie Reese (UT)
Medal record
Men's swimming
Representing the United States
Event	1st	2nd	3rd
Pan American Games	0	2	0
Total	0	2	0
Pan American Games
Silver medal – second place	2019 Lima	200 m butterfly
Silver medal – second place	2019 Lima	4×200 m freestyle

Samuel Pomajevich (born October 12, 1998) is an American swimmer who competed for the University of Texas, and received two silver medals at 2019 Pan American Games, in Lima, Peru, one in the 200 meter butterfly, and one in the 4x200 meter freestyle relay.

Pomajevich was born one of three siblings to Gary and Judy Pomajevich on October 12, 1988 in Arlington, Virginia. He grew up in nearby Manassas, and attended Stonewall Jackson High School in Quicksburg in Shenandoah County. At the group 6A State Championship meet in February, 2016, as a 17-year old at the George Mason University Aquatic Center in Fredericksburg, Pomajevich placed first representing Stonewall Jackson High in the 100 butterfly with a time of 48.84, earning a State title in his High School Senior year. In club swimming, he represented and trained with the Nations Capital Swim Club based in Washington, DC, and active throughout Virginia. NCAP, as it is known, has been a large and highly successful program, that has mentored numerous Olympians, and for a non-collegiate team, had a record number of their swimmers at the 2016 Olympic trials.

== Pan American games ==
He earned two silver medals in the 200-meter butterfly and 4×200-meter freestyle relay at the 2019 Pan American Games in Lima, Peru.

== University of Texas ==
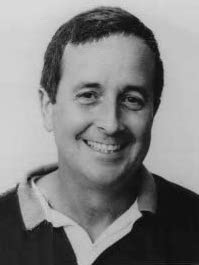
UT Coach Eddie Reese

Pomajevich studied at the University of Texas at Austin on an athletic scolarship from around 2017-2021, graduating with a degree in Mechanical Engineering in 2021. He swam for Hall of Fame Coach Eddie Reese, and was twice a collegiate All American, first in the 500 freestyle in 2018, and then in the 200 butterfly in 2021. He received three Honorable mention All American honors in 2018 in the 200 freestyle and 200 butterfly, and in 2021 in the 100 butterfly. In 2020, he was part of the UT swim team that won the Big 12 Conference championship. A competent scholar, he won Big 12 First Team Academic Honors in both the 2018-2019 and the 2020-2021 seasons. At the Big 12 Championships in the 2018-2019 season, Pomajevich was a finalist in the 200 butterfly, placing third with a time of 1:45.80. In the 500 freestyle, he placed eleventh with a time of 4:26.64 and finished 12th in the 200 freestyle with a time of 1:38.91. At the more prestigious NCAA national tournament in 2018-19 season, Pomajevich placed 17th in the 200 butterfly with a time of 1:41.82. In the 2017-18 season at the NCAA Championships, he had one of his best finishes placing sixth in the 500 freestyle with a time of 4:12.83.

== Careers ==
He has worked in the field of data processing as a programmer. Pomajevich holds a number of data processing specializations from Coursera including Data Science Fundamentals with Python and SQL specialization, and IBM Data Science Specialization.
