= Ivi Monteiro =

Brazilian swimmer (born 1984)

Personal information
- Full name: Ivi Monteiro
- Nationality: Brazil
- Born: November 16, 1984 (age 41) Rio de Janeiro, Rio de Janeiro, Brazil
- Height: 1.70 m (5 ft 7 in)
- Weight: 60 kg (130 lb)

Sport
- Sport: Swimming
- Strokes: Butterfly, Freestyle
Medal record
Women's swimming
Representing Brazil
South American Games
Gold medal – first place	2002 Belém	100 m butterfly
Gold medal – first place	2002 Belém	4x100 m freestyle
Gold medal – first place	2002 Belém	4x100 m medley
Bronze medal – third place	2002 Belém	200 m butterfly

Ivi Monteiro (born November 16, 1984, in Rio de Janeiro) is a butterfly and freestyle swimmer from Brazil.

At the 2002 South American Games, in Belém, she won three gold medals in the 100-metre butterfly, 4×100-metre freestyle and 4×100-metre medley, and the bronze medal in the 200-metre butterfly.

Participating in the 2003 World Aquatics Championships, in Barcelona, she finished 14th in the 4×100-metre medley, 25th in the 100-metre butterfly, and 34th in the 50-metre butterfly.

At the 2003 Pan American Games in Santo Domingo, Dominican Republic, Monteiro finished 4th in the 4×100-metre medley, and 5th in the 100-metre butterfly.

On May 9, 2004, she broke the South American record in the 4×100-metre medley, with a time of 4:12.90, along with Fabíola Molina, Mariana Katsuno and Rebeca Gusmão. With this time, the Brazilian team was, at this time, qualifying for Athens 2004, but later, other countries obtained best marks, and took the Monteiro vacancy for the Olympics.

She ended her career in late 2013, at the Open tournament, held in Porto Alegre, Brazil.
