= Luiz Altamir Melo =

Brazilian swimmer (born 1996)

Luiz Melo
Personal information
- Full name: Luiz Altamir Lopes Melo
- Nationality: Brazil
- Born: 9 May 1996 (age 30) Boa Vista, Roraima, Brazil
- Height: 1.74 m (5 ft 9 in)
- Weight: 69 kg (152 lb)

Sport
- Sport: Swimming
- Strokes: Butterfly, freestyle
Medal record
Men's swimming
Representing Brazil
World Championships (SC)
Gold medal – first place	2018 Hangzhou	4×200 m freestyle
Pan American Games
Gold medal – first place	2015 Toronto	4×200 m freestyle
Gold medal – first place	2019 Lima	4×200 m freestyle
Gold medal – first place	2023 Santiago	4×200 m freestyle
Silver medal – second place	2019 Lima	4×100 m medley
Bronze medal – third place	2019 Lima	400 m freestyle
South American Championships
Gold medal – first place	2016 Asunción	400 m freestyle
Gold medal – first place	2016 Asunción	200 m butterfly
Gold medal – first place	2016 Asunción	4×200 m freestyle
Silver medal – second place	2016 Asunción	200 m freestyle
Bronze medal – third place	2016 Asunción	4×100 m freestyle
Youth Olympic Games
Silver medal – second place	2014 Nanjing	4×100 m mixed freestyle

Luiz Altamir Lopes Melo (Note: This name uses Portuguese naming customs: the first or maternal family name is Lopes and the second or paternal family name is Melo.) (born 9 May 1996 in Boa Vista) is a Brazilian swimmer.

== International career ==
=== 2013–16 ===
He was at the 2013 FINA World Junior Swimming Championships, in Dubai, United Arab Emirates, where he finished 5th in the 200-metre butterfly, 6th in the 4x200-metre freestyle relay, 8th in the 200-metre freestyle, and 10th in the 400-metre freestyle.

At the 2014 Summer Youth Olympics in Nanjing, he won a silver medal in the Mixed 4 × 100 m freestyle relay. He also finished 5th in the 200 metre butterfly, and 7th in the 200 metre freestyle and 400 metre freestyle.

At the 2015 Pan American Games in Toronto, Ontario, Canada, Altamir won a gold medal in the 4×200-metre freestyle relay, where he broke the Pan Am Games record with a time of 7:11.15, along with João de Lucca, Thiago Pereira, and Nicolas Oliveira.

At the 2015 World Aquatics Championships in Kazan, he finished 15th in the Men's 4 × 200 metre freestyle relay, along with João de Lucca, Thiago Pereira, and Nicolas Oliveira.

At the Open tournament held in Palhoça in December 2015, he obtained qualification for the 2016 Summer Olympics in the 400-metre freestyle, with a time of 3:50.32, 0.7 seconds from the South American record.

=== 2016 Summer Olympics ===
At the 2016 Summer Olympics, he finished 32nd in the Men's 400 metre freestyle. He also competed in the Men's 4 × 200 metre freestyle relay, where the Brazilian relay finished in 15th place.

=== 2016–20 ===
At the 2018 Pan Pacific Swimming Championships in Tokyo, Japan, he finished 4th in the Men's 4 × 200 metre freestyle relay, 8th in the Men's 200 metre freestyle and 19th in the Men's 400 metre freestyle.

At the 2018 FINA World Swimming Championships (25 m) in Hangzhou, China, Luiz Altamir Melo, along with Fernando Scheffer, Leonardo Coelho Santos and Breno Correia, surprised the world by winning the gold medal in the Men's 4 × 200 metre freestyle relay, breaking the world record, with a time of 6:46.81. The relay was composed only of young people between 19 and 23 years and was not favorite to gold. He also finished 6th in the Men's 200 metre butterfly and 8th in the Men's 200 metre freestyle.

At the 2019 World Aquatics Championships in Gwangju, South Korea, Brazil's young 4 × 200 metre freestyle relay team, now with João de Lucca instead of Leonardo Coelho Santos, lowered the South American record in almost 3 seconds, with a time of 7:07.12, at heats. They finished 7th, with a time of 7:07.64 in the final. It was the first time that Brazil's 4x200m freestyle relay had qualified for a World Championships final, and the result qualified Brazil for the Tokyo 2020 Olympics. He also finished 13th in the Men's 200 metre butterfly, and 15th in the Men's 400 metre freestyle.

At the 2019 Pan American Games held in Lima, Peru, he won a gold medal in the Men's 4 × 200 metre freestyle relay, breaking the Pan American Games record; a silver medal in the Men's 4 × 100 metre medley relay (by participating at heats); and a bronze medal in the Men's 400 metre freestyle. He also finished 4th in the Men's 200 metre butterfly.

He competed at the 2020 Summer Olympics.
