= João de Lucca =

Brazilian swimmer (born 1990)

Personal information
- Full name: João Bevilaqua de Lucca
- Nationality: Brazil
- Born: 6 January 1990 (age 36) Rio de Janeiro, Rio de Janeiro, Brazil
- Height: 1.93 m (6 ft 4 in)
- Weight: 96 kg (212 lb)

Sport
- Sport: Swimming
- Strokes: Freestyle
- College team: University Of Louisville
- Coach: Arthur Albiero (Louisville)
Medal record
Men's swimming
Representing Brazil
World Championships (SC)
| Gold medal – first place | 2014 Doha | 4×50 m medley |
| Bronze medal – third place | 2014 Doha | 4×50 m mixed free |
Pan Pacific Championships
| Bronze medal – third place | 2014 Gold Coast | 4×100 m freestyle |
Pan American Games
| Gold medal – first place | 2015 Toronto | 200 m freestyle |
| Gold medal – first place | 2015 Toronto | 4×100 m freestyle |
| Gold medal – first place | 2015 Toronto | 4×200 m freestyle |
| Gold medal – first place | 2019 Lima | 4×200 m freestyle |
| Silver medal – second place | 2019 Lima | 4×100 m mixed freestyle |
World Junior Championships
| Silver medal – second place | 2006 Rio | 4×200 m freestyle |
| Bronze medal – third place | 2008 Monterrey | 4×100 m freestyle |

João Bevilaqua de Lucca (born 6 January 1990 in Rio de Janeiro) is a Brazilian swimmer.

He won the silver medal in the 4×200-metre freestyle at the 2006 FINA Youth World Swimming Championships in Rio de Janeiro, and the bronze medal in the 4×100-metre freestyle at the 2008 FINA Youth World Swimming Championships in Monterrey.

de Lucca attended and swam for the University of Louisville under Head Coach Arthur Albiero.

== International career ==
=== 2011–12 ===
He joined the Brazilian national delegation who attended the 2011 World Aquatics Championships in Shanghai, where he finished 14th in the 4×200-metre freestyle.

=== 2012 Summer Olympics ===
He participated in the 2012 Summer Olympics in London, as the Brazilian reserve of the 4×100-metre medley.

=== 2013–16 ===
He qualified to compete in the 2013 World Aquatics Championships in Barcelona. João de Lucca finished 11th in the 4×200-metre freestyle, along with Nicolas Oliveira, Fernando Santos and Vinícius Waked.

At the 2014 Pan Pacific Swimming Championships in Gold Coast, Queensland, Australia, he won a bronze medal in the Brazilian 4×100-metre freestyle relay, along with Bruno Fratus, Marcelo Chierighini and Nicolas Oliveira. He also finished 7th in the 100-metre freestyle, and 11th in the 200-metre freestyle.

At the 2014 FINA World Swimming Championships (25 m) in Doha, Qatar, João de Lucca won a bronze medal in the 4 × 50 metre mixed freestyle relay (along with César Cielo, Etiene Medeiros and Larissa Oliveira). The Brazilian team broke the South American record with a time of 1:29.17, only 4 hundredths slower than Russia, who won the silver medal. He also won a gold medal in the Men's 4 × 50 metre medley relay, by participating at heats. In the Men's 4 × 200 metre freestyle relay, João de Lucca broke three South American records: at heats, with a time of 6:55.50; in the final, with a time of 6:54.43 (where Brazil finished in 6th place) and also set a South American record in the 200-metre freestyle with a time of 1:41.85, opening the relay for Brazil. In the Men's 100 metre freestyle, João de Lucca qualified in 2nd place for the final, with a time of 46.29. In the final, finished in 7th place. In the Brazilian Men's 4 × 100 metre freestyle relay, João de Lucca finished in 8th place in the final. In the Men's 200 metre freestyle (it was the first race of the competition for de Lucca), he did not swim well and failed to qualify for the final, finishing in 19th place. However, with the 1:41.85 obtained in the 4x200-metre relay, João de Lucca could have obtained the bronze medal in the 200-metre freestyle.

At the 2015 Pan American Games in Toronto, Ontario, Canada, de Lucca won three gold medals: in the 200-metre freestyle, with a time of 1:46.42, a new Pan Am Games and South American record; in the 4×200-metre freestyle relay, where he broke the Pan Am Games record with a time of 7:11.15, along with Luiz Altamir Melo, Thiago Pereira and Nicolas Oliveira; and in the 4×100-metre freestyle relay, where he broke the Pan Am Games record with a time of 3:13.66, along with Matheus Santana, Marcelo Chierighini and Bruno Fratus.

At the 2015 World Aquatics Championships in Kazan, João de Lucca finished 4th in the Men's 4 × 100 metre freestyle relay, along with Marcelo Chierighini, Bruno Fratus and Matheus Santana. César Cielo didn't swam the final - despite being participating in the championship, he was feeling shoulder pain on this day. In the Men's 200 metre freestyle, he performed poorly. He went to the semifinals, but made only a time of 1:48.23, far below his South American record of 1:46.42 obtained at the Pan American Games few days before, and finished 16th overall. He also finished 9th in the 4 × 100 metre mixed medley relay, along with Felipe Lima, Daiene Dias and Daynara de Paula., and 15th in the Men's 4 × 200 metre freestyle relay, along with Luiz Altamir Melo, Thiago Pereira and Nicolas Oliveira.

=== 2016 Summer Olympics ===
At the 2016 Summer Olympics, he went to the Men's 4 × 100 metre freestyle relay final, finishing in 5th place. He also competed in the Men's 200 metre freestyle, finishing in 25th place, and in the Men's 4 × 200 metre freestyle relay, where the Brazilian relay finished in 15th place.

=== 2017–20 ===
After the Rio 2016 Games, João de Lucca became discouraged, leaving to join the Brazilian team in 2017 and 2018. He divided his time between training, and coaching a team in the city of Louisville, and even thought about retiring. But in 2019, he won a place for the World Championships and the Pan American Games again.

At the 2019 World Aquatics Championships in Gwangju, South Korea, Brazil's young 4 × 200 metre freestyle relay team, now with João de Lucca instead of Leonardo Coelho Santos, lowered the South American record in almost 3 seconds, with a time of 7:07.12, at heats. They finished 7th, with a time of 7:07.64 in the final. It was the first time that Brazil's 4 × 200 m freestyle relay had qualified for a World Championships final, and the result qualified Brazil for the Tokyo 2020 Olympics.

At the 2019 Pan American Games held in Lima, Peru, he won a gold medal in the Men's 4 × 200 metre freestyle relay, breaking the Pan American Games record. In the Mixed 4 × 100 metre freestyle relay, he won a silver medal, by participating at heats.
