= Vinícius Waked =

Brazilian swimmer

Personal information
- Full name: Vinícius Rocha Barbosa Waked
- Nationality: Brazil
- Born: June 1, 1987 (age 39) Rio de Janeiro, Rio de Janeiro, Brazil
- Height: 1.90 m (6 ft 3 in)
- Weight: 84 kg (185 lb)

Sport
- Sport: Swimming
- Strokes: Freestyle

Vinícius Rocha Barbosa Waked (born June 1, 1987 in Rio de Janeiro) is a freestyle Brazilian swimmer.

Waked competed in the NCAA championship for Arizona State University, where he majored in foreign trade.

He was a member of the Brazilian team at the 2010 FINA World Swimming Championships (25 m) in Dubai.

In 2010, he was punished for doping with a two-month ban for the use of isometheptene, taken as a medication for a headache. In 2011, Waked was one of four swimmers, alongside César Cielo, Nicholas Santos and Henrique Barbosa, caught in a doping test for the use of the banned substance furosemide. The Court of Arbitration for Sport (CAS) found that Brazilian athletes were not guilty in the case and decided to just keep the warning already stipulated by the Brazilian Confederation of Aquatic Sports (CBDA). Waked, however, took a one-year suspension for being a repeat offender. He returned to the pools in May 2012.

Waked qualified to compete in the 2013 World Aquatics Championships in Barcelona. He finished 7th in the 4×100-metre freestyle, along with Fernando Santos, Marcelo Chierighini and Nicolas Oliveira. He also finished 11th in the 4×200-metre freestyle, along with João de Lucca, Nicolas Oliveira and Fernando Santos.

In April 2016, it was reported by the Brazilian press that Waked was undergoing a controversial non-surgical spinal decompression treatment for spinal disc herniation of the L1 and L2 lumbar vertebrae, coupled with a protrusion of L4 and L5, in the hope of still being able to qualify for the 2016 Summer Olympics in his hometown of Rio de Janeiro. The treatment was tried after conventional physiotherapy had unsatisfactory results, and Waked reported an improvement of his pain.
