= Swimming at the 2002 South American Games =

The swimming competition at the 2002 South American Games consisted of swimming events held August 6–9, 2002 in Belém, Brazil.

== Results ==
=== Men's events ===
Event	Gold		Silver		Bronze	
50m freestyle	Rodrigo de Oliveira; Brazil	24.00	Antônio Paz Vielmo; Brazil	24.02	Albert Subirats; Venezuela	24.24
100m freestyle	Albert Subirats; Venezuela	52.18	Maximiliano Schnettler; Chile	52.64	Rodrigo de Oliveira; Brazil	52.79
200m freestyle	Maximiliano Schnettler; Chile	1:54.50 RS	Eduardo Ramirez; Venezuela	1:56.24	Albert Subirats; Venezuela	1:58.40
400m freestyle	Albert Subirats; Venezuela	4:05.71	Gustavo Taveira; Brazil	4:06.12	Brunno Colosimo; Brazil	4:08.11
1500m freestyle	Alejandro Gómez; Venezuela	16:05.05	Gustavo Taveira; Brazil	16:27.91	Brunno Colosimo; Brazil	16:44.21
100m backstroke	Daniel Novak; Brazil	59.35	Rodrigo de Oliveira; Brazil	59.85	Raymer Vezga; Venezuela	1:00.54
200m backstroke	Rodrigo de Oliveira; Brazil	2:11.43	Daniel Novak; Brazil	2:13.10	Oscar Alonso; Venezuela	2:15.68
100m breaststroke	Alan Nagaoka; Brazil	1:05.99	George Albuquerque; Brazil	1:06.63	Eugenio Romoli; Argentina	1:06.89
200m breaststroke	Thiago Pereira; Brazil	2:17.94 RS	Eugenio Romoli; Argentina	2:24.98	Leopoldo Andara; Venezuela	2:26.74
100m butterfly	Wesley Mâncio; Brazil	56.66	José Cadorna; Venezuela	56.92	Anderson Antônio; Brazil	57.60
200m butterfly	Anderson Antônio; Brazil	2:05.50	José Cadorna; Venezuela	2:07.09	Wesley Mâncio; Brazil	2:07.41
200m I.M.	Lucas Salatta; Brazil	2:07.45 RS	Leopoldo Andara; Venezuela	2:09.10	Alan Nagaoka; Brazil	2:09.14
400m I.M.	Lucas Salatta; Brazil	4:33.41 RS	Leopoldo Andara; Venezuela	4:35.27	Alan Nagaoka; Brazil	4:37.04
4×100m freestyle relay	Brazil; Salatta, Oliveira, Mâncio, Vielmo	3:32.97	Venezuela; Ramirez, Alesi, Jimenez, Subirats	3:34.22	Argentina; Rodriguez, Romoli, Verberck, Franco	3:50.07
4×100m medley relay	Brazil; Novak, Nagaoka, Mâncio, Vielmo	3:53.68 RS	Venezuela; Vezga, Andara, Alesi, Subirats	3:59.15	Argentina; Lebrand, Romoli, Rodriguez, Franco	4:07.83

=== Women's events ===
Event	Gold		Silver		Bronze	
50m freestyle	Arlene Semeco; Venezuela	26.18 RS	Amara Silva; Brazil	26.57	Yamile Bahamonde (Ecuador) Eduador	26.78
100m freestyle	Arlene Semeco; Venezuela	57.53 RS	Amara Silva; Brazil	58.55	Marita Wong; Peru	58.86
200m freestyle	Ana Muniz; Brazil	2:05.51 RS	Cecilia Biagioli; Argentina	2:07.23	Marita Wong; Peru	2:08.37
400m freestyle	Cecilia Biagioli; Argentina	4:22.60 RS	Ana Muniz; Brazil	4:28.20	Kristel Kobrich; Chile	4:30.75
800m freestyle	Cecilia Biagioli; Argentina	9:03.26 RS	Kristel Kobrich; Chile	9:07.30	Ana Muniz; Brazil	9:10.69
100m backstroke	Talita Ribeiro; Brazil	1:04.39 RS	Gabriela Costanzo; Paraguay	1:07.21	Francy Palma; Venezuela	1:07.86
200m backstroke	Talita Ribeiro; Brazil	2:22.12 RS	Valeria Silva; Peru	2:25.77	Constanza Orta; Argentina	2:26.98
100m breaststroke	Agustina Giovanni; Argentina	1:13.16 RS	Marcelle Lopes; Brazil	1:14.04	Valeria Silva; Peru	1:15.20
200m breaststroke	Marcelle Lopes; Brazil	2:36.92 RS	Agustina Giovanni; Argentina	2:37.00	Corina Gonçalves; Venezuela	2:43.02
100m butterfly	Ivi Monteiro; Brazil	1:03.19 RS	Maria Aguila; Peru	1:03.99	Bárbara Jatobá; Brazil	1:06.05
200m butterfly	Bárbara Jatobá; Brazil	2:21.80 RS	Alicia Garcia; Peru	2:21.90	Ivi Monteiro; Brazil	2:22.03
200m I.M.	Lílian Cerroni; Brazil	2:23.76 RS	Agustina Giovanni; Argentina	2:25.55	Marita Wong; Peru	2:26.64
400m I.M.	Bárbara Jatobá; Brazil	5:01.82 RS	Lílian Cerroni; Brazil	5:03.20	Silvia Perez; Venezuela	5:16.94
4×100m freestyle relay	Brazil; Silva, Amblard, Ribeiro, Monteiro	3:55.02 RS	Venezuela; Ruiz, Lopez, Vilar, Semeco	3:57.12	Argentina; Orta, Zavattaro, Giovanni, Biagioli	4:09.64
4×100m medley relay	Brazil; Ribeiro, Lopes, Monteiro, Silva	4:22.49 RS	Peru; Guerra, Silva, Garcia, Wong	4:31.03	Venezuela; Palma, Gonçalves, Carrillo, Semeco	4:32.61
