= Eduardo Deboni =

Brazilian competitive swimmer

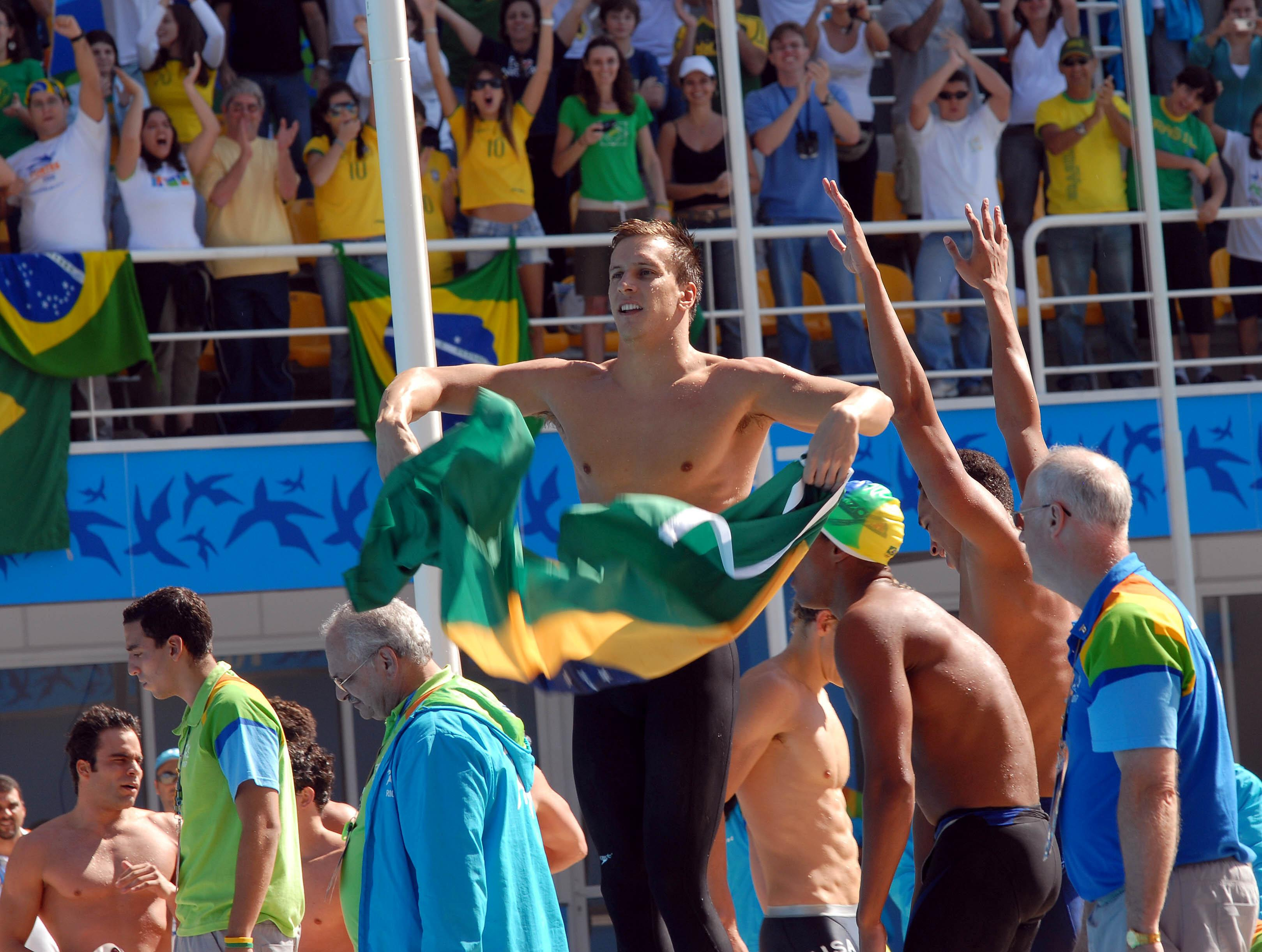

Personal information
- Nationality: Brazil
- Born: 24 September 1981 (age 45) Erechim, Rio Grande do Sul, Brazil
- Height: 1.90 m (6 ft 3 in)
- Weight: 84 kg (185 lb)

Sport
- Sport: Swimming
- Strokes: Freestyle
Medal record
Men's swimming
Representing Brazil
Pan American Games
Gold medal – first place	2007 Rio de Janeiro	4x100 m freestyle
Silver medal – second place	2007 Rio de Janeiro	4x100 m medley

Eduardo Deboni (born 24 September 1981 in Erechim) is a Brazilian competitive swimmer. Integrated the Brazilian national delegation in 2008 Summer Olympics in Beijing, China, as a reserve.

He was at the 2007 World Aquatics Championships, in Melbourne where he helped the 4×100-metre freestyle relay of Brazil to qualify for the final.

At the 2007 Pan American Games, in Rio de Janeiro, he won a gold medal in the 4×100-metre freestyle (beating the South American and Pan American records, with a time of 3:15.90, along with Fernando Silva, Nicolas Oliveira and César Cielo), silver in the 4×100-metre medley (by having participated in heats) and 4th place in the 100-metre freestyle.

Participating in the 2008 FINA World Swimming Championships (25 m), in Manchester, reached the 4×100-metre freestyle final, finishing in 8th place. also helped the 4×100-metre medley to go to the final beating the South American record with a time of 3:29.74, along with Guilherme Guido Felipe França and Lucas Salatta; ranked 25th in the 50-metre freestyle, and 28th in the 100-metre freestyle.
