= Ricardo Vargas =

Mexican swimmer (born 1997)

Personal information
- Full name: Ricardo David Vargas Jacobo
- Born: 21 November 1997 (age 28) Cuernavaca, Mexico

Sport
- Sport: Swimming
Medal record
Men's swimming
Representing Mexico
Pan American Games
Bronze medal – third place	2019 Lima	800 m freestyle
Bronze medal – third place	2019 Lima	1500 m freestyle
Bronze medal – third place	2019 Lima	4×200 m freestyle

Ricardo Vargas (born 21 November 1997) is a Mexican swimmer. He competed in the men's 1500 metre freestyle event at the 2016 Summer Olympics.
