= José Ángel Martínez =

Mexican swimmer (born 1997)

Personal information
- Born: 3 June 1997 (age 29) Nuevo Laredo, Tamaulipas, Mexico

Sport
- Sport: Swimming
- Strokes: Butterfly
- College team: Texas A&M
Medal record
Men's swimming
Representing Mexico
Pan American Games
Bronze medal – third place	2019 Lima	4×200 m freestyle
Bronze medal – third place	2019 Lima	Mixed 4×100 m freestyle
Central American and Caribbean Games
Gold medal – first place	2023 San Salvador	4×100 m freestyle
Gold medal – first place	2023 San Salvador	4×100 m mixed freestyle
Bronze medal – third place	2023 San Salvador	200 m ind. medley

José Ángel Martínez Gómez (born 3 June 1997) is a Mexican swimmer. He competed in the men's 100 metre butterfly event at the 2017 World Aquatics Championships. He also competed in the men's 200 metre individual medley at the 2020 Summer Olympics.
