= Patricia Maldonado (swimmer) =

Venezuelan swimmer

Personal information
- Nationality: Venezuela
- Born: November 15, 1991 (age 34)

Sport
- Sport: Swimming
Medal record
South American Championships
Bronze medal – third place	2008 São Paulo	800 Free Relay

Patricia Maldonado (born November 15, 1991) is a long-distance and open water swimmer from Venezuela. She has swum for Venezuela at the:

- 2008 Open Water Worlds (5K)
- 2008 South American Championships
- 2009 World Championships (5K and 10K)
