= Daniele Tirabassi =

Venezuelan swimmer (born 1988)

Personal information
- Full name: Daniele Tirabassi
- National team: Venezuela
- Born: 16 August 1988 (age 37) Caracas, Venezuela
- Height: 1.90 m (6 ft 3 in)
- Weight: 83 kg (183 lb)

Sport
- Sport: Swimming
- Strokes: Freestyle
- Club: Pine Crest Swim Team (U.S.)
Medal record
Men's swimming
Representing Venezuela
South American Games
Gold medal – first place	2010 Medellín	4x100 m freestyle
Gold medal – first place	2010 Medellín	4x200 m freestyle
Bronze medal – third place	2014 Santiago	4x200 m freestyle
Central American and Caribbean Games
Silver medal – second place	2010 Mayagüez	400 m freestyle
Bronze medal – third place	2010 Mayagüez	200 m freestyle

Daniele Tirabassi (born August 16, 1988) is a Venezuelan swimmer, who specialized in long-distance freestyle events. He represented his nation Venezuela at the 2008 Summer Olympics, and has also won a career total of five medals (two golds, one silver, and two bronze) in a major international competition, spanning two editions of the South American Games and the 2010 Central American and Caribbean Games. Tirabassi also holds multiple Venezuelan championship titles and national records in both the long-distance freestyle (200 and 400 m), and freestyle relay events.

Tirabassi competed for Venezuela in the men's 400 m freestyle at the 2008 Summer Olympics in Beijing. He fired off a powerful 3:52.69 to win handily over the rest of the competition and dip beneath the FINA B-standard (3:58.00) at the Latin Cup in Serravalle, San Marino. Leading the first heat from the initial length until the 250-metre lap, Tirabassi tried to hold on with Norway's Gard Kvale towards the final turn of the race by just half a body length apart from each other, but could not catch him immediately to regain his lead and end up instead with a runner-up time in 3:53.26. Tirabassi failed to advance further to the top eight final, as he placed thirty-first overall in the prelims.

At the 2009 FINA World Championships in Rome, Italy, Tirabassi set a Venezuelan record of 1:48.51 to touch the wall first on the tenth heat of the 200 m freestyle. At the 2011 Pan American Games in Guadalajara, Mexico, Tirabassi posted a time of 1:52.31 to round out the field in last place on the same distance, but missed his record by nearly four seconds.

Tirabassi is also a member of the Pine Crest Swim Team in Miami, Florida, where he trained with numerous world-class swimmers including three-time Olympian Bradley Ally of Barbados, and Genaro Prono, an Auburn University graduate and a breaststroke specialist from Paraguay.
