= Fernando Silva (swimmer) =

Brazilian swimmer (born 1986)

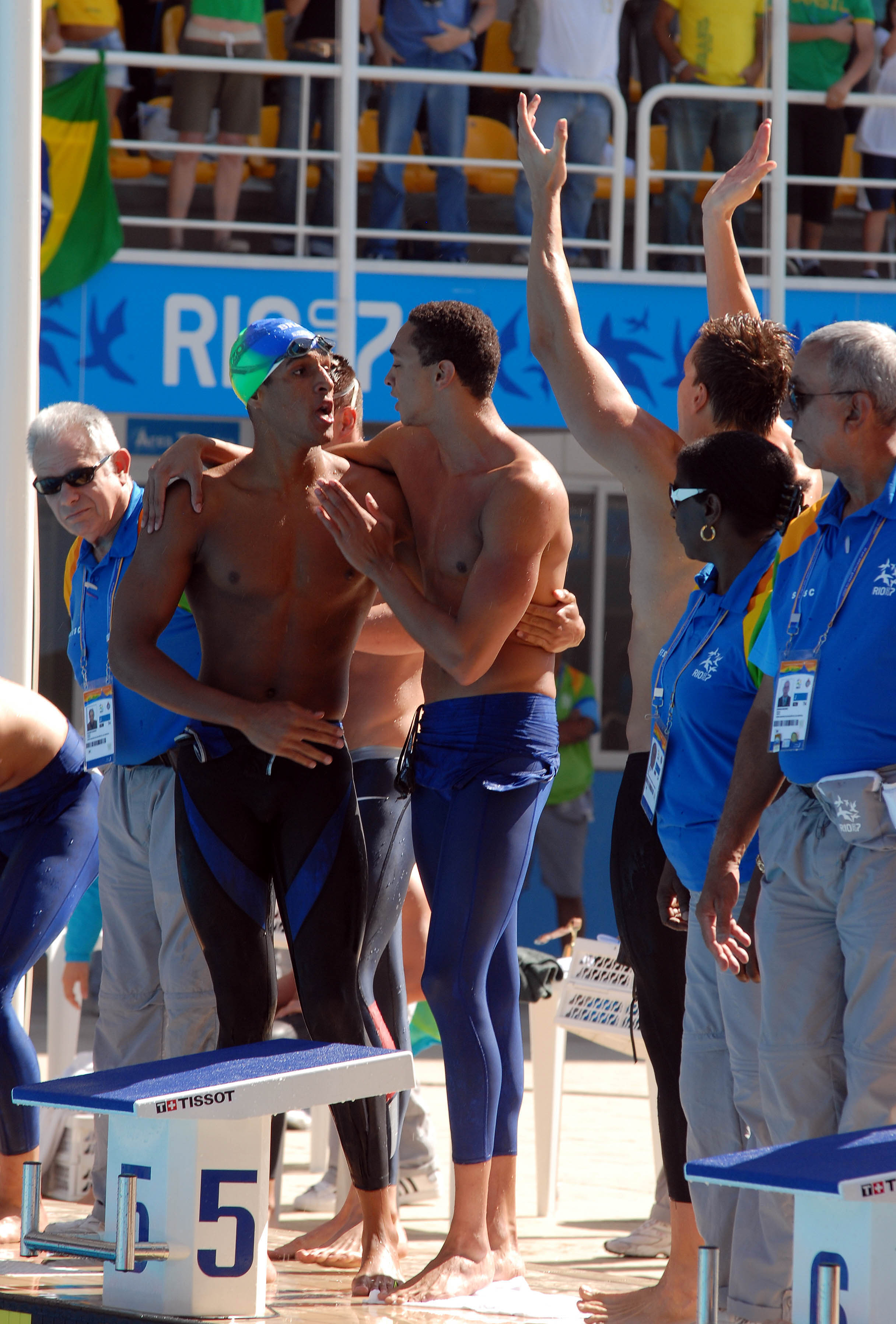
- Gabriel Mangabeira and Fernando Silva in 4×100-metre medley at 2007 Pan Am Games

Personal information
- Full name: Fernando Souza da Silva
- Nationality: Brazil
- Born: 7 April 1986 (age 40) Rome, Italy
- Height: 1.96 m (6 ft 5 in)
- Weight: 82 kg (181 lb)

Sport
- Sport: Swimming
- Strokes: Freestyle
- Club: EC Pinheiros
Medal record
Pan American Games
| Gold medal – first place | 2007 Rio | 4x100m freestyle |
Universiade
| Bronze medal – third place | 2007 Bangkok | 100m freestyle |
South American Games
| Gold medal – first place | 2014 Santiago | 4x100 m freestyle |
| Gold medal – first place | 2014 Santiago | 4x200 m freestyle |
| Bronze medal – third place | 2014 Santiago | 100 m butterfly |
South American Championships
| Gold medal – first place | 2008 São Paulo | 100m freestyle |
| Gold medal – first place | 2008 São Paulo | 100m butterfly |
| Gold medal – first place | 2008 São Paulo | 4x100m freestyle |

Fernando Souza da Silva (born 7 April 1986 in Rio de Janeiro) is an Olympic and national record holding swimmer from Brazil. He swam for Brazil at the 2008 Olympics, as a member of the men's 4×100-metre freestyle relay.

Until 2006, Fernando did not swim 50-metre and 100-metre freestyle; he was a butterfly stroke specialist. As he began to achieve good results in the faster swimming races, he became a sprinter and established himself as one of the best in his country.

He competed at the 2006 FINA World Swimming Championships (25 m) in Shanghai, where he finished 17th in the 200-metre butterfly.

Silva swam at the 2006 Pan Pacific Swimming Championships, where he finished 14th in the 100-metre butterfly, 17th in the 200-metre butterfly and was disqualified from the 4×100-metre freestyle.

At the 2007 Pan American Games in Rio de Janeiro, Silva won the gold medal in the 4×100-metre freestyle, beating the South American and Pan American records, with a time of 3:15.90, along with Eduardo Deboni, Nicolas Oliveira and César Cielo

Participating in the 2007 Summer Universiade in Bangkok, Thailand, Silva won the bronze medal in the 100-metre freestyle.

Silva was South American champion in the 100-metre freestyle and the 100-metre butterfly in São Paulo 2008.

He was at the 2008 FINA World Swimming Championships (25 m), in Manchester, where he reached the 4×100-metre medley final, finishing 6th, and beating the short-course South American Record, with a time of 3:28.88, along with Guilherme Guido, Felipe França e Lucas Salatta. Silva was also in the 100-metre freestyle final, finishing 8th and the 4×100-metre freestyle final, also finishing 8th; and he finished 14th in the 50-metre freestyle.

At the 2008 Summer Olympics in Beijing, Silva participated in the 4×100-metre freestyle, but the Brazilian team was disqualified.

At the 2009 World Aquatics Championships, held in Rome, Silva ranked fourth in the 4×100-metre freestyle, along with Nicolas Oliveira, Guilherme Roth and César Cielo, with a time of 3:10.80, a new South American record.

He was at the 2010 Pan Pacific Swimming Championships in Irvine, where he finished 25th in the 50-metre freestyle, 30th in the 100-metre butterfly, and 49th in the 100-metre freestyle.
