= Crox Acuña =

Venezuelan swimmer (born 1990)

Personal information
- Full name: Crox Ernesto Acuña Rodríguez
- Nationality: Venezuela
- Born: June 23, 1990 (age 36) Maracay, Venezuela
- Height: 1.91 m (6 ft 3 in)

Sport
- Sport: Swimming
Medal record
Pan American Games
Bronze medal – third place	2011 Guadalajara	4×100 m freestyle
Bronze medal – third place	2011 Guadalajara	4×200 m freestyle

Crox Ernesto Acuña Rodriguez (born June 23, 1990, in Maracay, Aragua, Venezuela) is an Olympic and national record-holding swimmer from Venezuela.

== Participation ==
He swam for Venezuela at the:

- 2006 South American Games
- 2006 Central American & Caribbean Games
- 2007 World Championships
- 2007 Pan American Games
- South American Swimming Championships 2008
- 2008 Olympics
- 2009 World Championships
- 2010 South American Games
- 2012 Summer Olympics
