= Nicolas Oliveira (swimmer) =

Brazilian swimmer (born 1987)

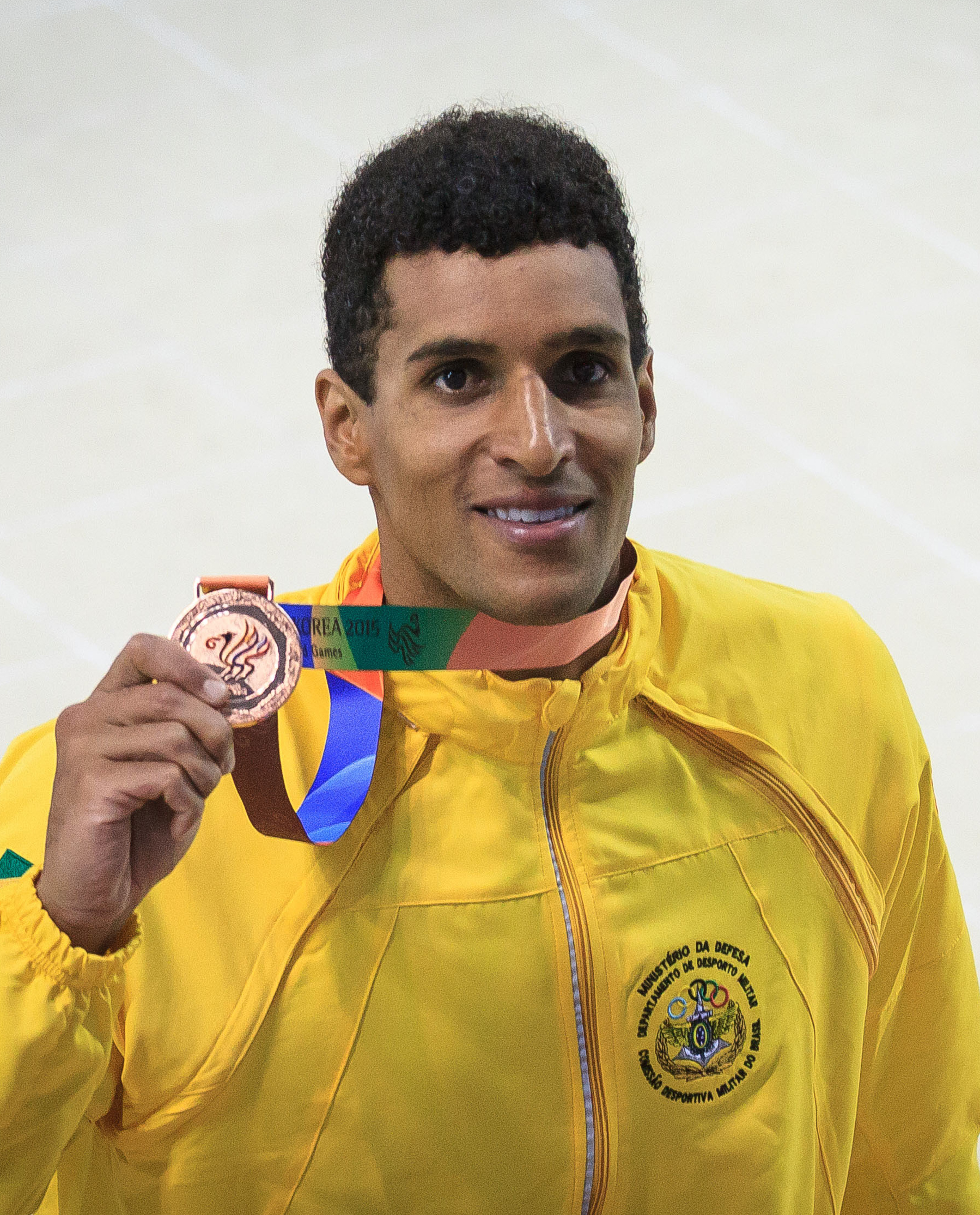
- Oliveira at the 2015 Military World Games

Personal information
- Full name: Nicolas Nilo César de Oliveira
- Nickname: Nilo
- Nationality: Brazil
- Born: 4 August 1987 (age 39) Belo Horizonte, Minas Gerais, Brazil
- Height: 1.98 m (6 ft 6 in)
- Weight: 94 kg (207 lb)

Sport
- Sport: Swimming
- Strokes: Freestyle
Medal record
Representing Brazil
World Championships (SC)
Bronze medal – third place	2010 Dubai	4 × 100 m freestyle
Bronze medal – third place	2010 Dubai	4 × 100 m medley
Pan Pacific Championships
Bronze medal – third place	2014 Gold Coast	4 × 100 m freestyle
Pan American Games
Gold medal – first place	2007 Rio	4 × 100 m freestyle
Gold medal – first place	2007 Rio	4 × 200 m freestyle
Gold medal – first place	2011 Guadalajara	4 × 100 m freestyle
Gold medal – first place	2015 Toronto	4×100 m freestyle
Gold medal – first place	2015 Toronto	4×200 m freestyle
Silver medal – second place	2011 Guadalajara	4 × 200 m freestyle
Summer Universiade
Silver medal – second place	2011 Shenzhen	4 × 100 m freestyle
South American Games
Gold medal – first place	2010 Medellín	4 × 100 m medley
Gold medal – first place	2014 Santiago	4 × 100 m freestyle
Gold medal – first place	2014 Santiago	4 × 200 m freestyle
Silver medal – second place	2010 Medellín	50 m freestyle
Silver medal – second place	2010 Medellín	100 m freestyle
Silver medal – second place	2010 Medellín	4 × 100 m freestyle
Silver medal – second place	2010 Medellín	4 × 200 m freestyle
Silver medal – second place	2014 Santiago	200 m freestyle
Bronze medal – third place	2010 Medellín	200 m freestyle

Nicolas Nilo César de Oliveira (born 4 August 1987) is a Brazilian former freestyle swimmer who specialized in sprint events.

== International career ==
=== 2006–2008 ===
Oliveira swam at the 2006 Pan Pacific Swimming Championships, where he finished 6th in the 4 × 200-metre freestyle, 14th in the 100-metre freestyle, 25th in the 200-metre freestyle, and was disqualified in the 4 × 100-metre freestyle.

His first appearance in World Championships, was at the 2007 World Aquatics Championships held in Melbourne, where he helped the 4 × 100-metre and 4 × 200-metre freestyle relay teams to qualify for the 2008 Summer Olympics. Oliveira earned 46th place in the 50-metre freestyle, 26th in the 100-metre freestyle, 17th in 200-metre freestyle, 8th in the 4 × 100-metre freestyle, and 11th in the 4 × 200-metre freestyle.

At the 2007 Pan American Games, Oliveira won the gold medal in the 4 × 100-metre freestyle relay and in the 4 × 200-metre freestyle. He also ranked fourth in the 200-metre freestyle.

=== 2008 Summer Olympics ===
At the 2008 Summer Olympics in Beijing, he participated in the 4 × 100-metre freestyle relay (where he was disqualified), 4 × 200-metre freestyle (16th place), and 4 × 100-metre medley (14th place).

=== 2009–2012 ===
At the 2009 World Aquatics Championships in Rome, along with César Cielo, Guilherme Roth, and Fernando Silva, he finished 4th in the 4 × 100-metre freestyle relay; with Thiago Pereira, Rodrigo Castro, and Lucas Salatta, he got the 10th place in the 4 × 200-metre freestyle. He also competed in the 100-metre freestyle finals, placing 8th, and finished in 18th place in the 200-metre freestyle.

He competed in the 2010 Pan Pacific Swimming Championships in Irvine, where he finished 5th in the 4 × 200-metre freestyle, 12th in the 100-metre freestyle, and 22nd in the 200-metre freestyle.

At the 2010 FINA World Swimming Championships (25 m) held in Dubai, the Brazilian national team, composed of César Cielo, Nicholas Santos, Marcelo Chierighini, and Nicolas Oliveira, won the bronze medal in the 4 × 100-metre freestyle, with a time of 3:05.74 (South American record), with Brazil beating the American team. He also won the bronze medal in the 4 × 100-metre medley race, by participating at heats.

Participating in the 2011 World Aquatics Championships held in Shanghai, Oliviera finished 13th in the 200-metre freestyle, 9th in the 4 × 100-metre freestyle, and 14th in the 4 × 200-metre freestyle.

He was in 2011 Summer Universiade, where he won the silver medal in the 4 × 100-metre freestyle.

At the 2011 Pan American Games in Guadalajara, Oliviera won the gold medal in the 4 × 100-metre freestyle relay and silver in the 4 × 200-metre freestyle. He also came in ninth place in the 200-metre freestyle.

=== 2012 Summer Olympics ===
At the 2012 Summer Olympics in London, Oliveira finished 9th in the 4 × 100-metre freestyle and 24th in the 100-metre freestyle.

=== 2012–2016 ===
Frustration with the result in England (24th in the 100-metre freestyle) made the Brazilian withdraw from swimming for six months. Oliveira went through a difficult process to rebuild, but he returned to compete.

At the 2013 World Aquatics Championships in Barcelona, he finished seventh in the 4 ×100-metre freestyle, along with Fernando Santos, Marcelo Chierighini, and Vinícius Waked. In the 200-metre freestyle, Oliveira classified to the semifinals with the best time of his life without super suits, 1:46.99. In the semifinals, he swam a half second above the qualification time, finishing 11th. He also finished 11th in the 4 × 200-metre freestyle, along with João de Lucca, Fernando Santos, and Vinícius Waked.

At the 2014 Pan Pacific Swimming Championships in Gold Coast, Queensland, Australia, Oliveira won a bronze medal in the Brazilian 4 × 100-metre freestyle relay, along with João de Lucca, Marcelo Chierighini, and Bruno Fratus. He also finished 5th in the 100-metre freestyle, 6th in the 200-metre freestyle, and 17th in the 50-metre freestyle.

At the 2015 Pan American Games in Toronto, Canada, Oliveira won a gold medal in the 4×200-metre freestyle relay, where he broke the Pan Am Games record with a time of 7:11.15, along with Luiz Altamir Melo, Thiago Pereira and João de Lucca, and finished 5th in the 200-metre freestyle. He also won a gold medal in the 4×100-metre freestyle relay, by participating at heats.

At the 2015 World Aquatics Championships in Kazan, he finished 15th in the Men's 4 × 200 metre freestyle relay, along with João de Lucca, Thiago Pereira and Luiz Altamir Melo., and 22nd in the Men's 200 metre freestyle.

=== 2016 Summer Olympics ===
Oliveira competed for the last time at the 2016 Summer Olympics, where he went to the Men's 4 × 100 metre freestyle relay final, finishing in 5th place. He also competed in the Men's 4 × 200 metre freestyle relay, where the Brazilian relay finished in 15th place, and in the Men's 100 metre freestyle, finishing 28th. At 29 years old, he said goodbye to swimming after three Olympic Games (Beijing 2008, London 2012 and Rio 2016), and six World Championships (Melbourne 2007, Rome 2009, Dubai 2010, Shanghai 2011, Barcelona 2013 and Kazan 2015).

== Records ==
Nicolas Oliveira is the current holder, or former holder, of the following records:

Long course (50 m):

- Former South American record holder of the 200-metre freestyle: 1:46.90, time obtained on 6 May 2009
- South American record holder of the 4 × 100-metre freestyle: 3:10.80, time obtained on 26 July 2009, along with Guilherme Roth, Fernando Silva, and César Cielo
- South American record holder of the 4 × 200-metre freestyle: 7:09.71, time obtained on 31 July 2009, along with Thiago Pereira, Rodrigo Castro, and Lucas Salatta

Short course (25 m):

- Former South American record holder of the 100-metre freestyle: 46.30, time obtained on 14 November 2009
- Former South American record holder of the 200-metre freestyle: 1:42.01, time obtained on 15 November 2009
- South American record holder of the 4 × 100-metre freestyle: 3:05.74, time obtained on 15 December 2010, along with Nicholas Santos, Marcelo Chierighini, and César Cielo

== See also ==
- Swimming at the 2009 World Aquatics Championships
- List of South American records in swimming
- List of Brazilian records in swimming
