= List of Venezuelan records in swimming =

This is a list of national swimming records for Venezuela. These records are kept by the Federación Venezolana de Deportes Acuáticos (FEVEDA).

== Long course (50 m) ==
=== Men ===
Event	Time		Name	Club	Date	Meet	Location	Ref
50 m freestyle	21.80	=	Alberto Mestre	Caparra	6 April 2024	Dominican Republic International Open	Santo Domingo, Dominican Republic	
50 m freestyle	21.80	=	Alberto Mestre	Caparra	10 April 2025	Dominican Republic International Open	Santo Domingo, Dominican Republic	
100 m freestyle	48.75	r	Alberto Mestre	Venezuela	5 July 2022 (Note: by official result source; 2 July 2022 by FEVEDA source, a typo)	Bolivarian Games	Valledupar, Bolivia	
200 m freestyle	1:47.02	h	Cristian Quintero	Venezuela	7 August 2016	Olympic Games	Rio de Janeiro, Brazil	
400 m freestyle	3:46.61	h	Alfonso Mestre	Venezuela	23 July 2023	World Championships	Fukuoka, Japan	
800 m freestyle	7:48.66	h	Alfonso Mestre	Venezuela	25 July 2023	World Championships	Fukuoka, Japan	
1500 m freestyle	15:14.10	h	Alfonso Mestre	Venezuela	29 July 2023	World Championships	Fukuoka, Japan	
50m backstroke	25.21	h	Robinson Molina	Venezuela	24 July 2018	CAC Games	Barranquilla, Colombia	
100m backstroke	54.31		Albert Subirats Altes	Venezuela	8 March 2014	South American Games	Santiago, Chile	
200m backstroke	1:59.59	h	Carlos Omaña	Venezuela	6 August 2015	World Championships	Kazan, Russia	
50m breaststroke	27.78	h	Miguel Ferreira	Venezuela	30 July 2013	World Championships	Barcelona, Spain	
100m breaststroke	1:00.48		Carlos Claverie	Sport Center Los Naranjas	28 November 2019	Delfines del Naco Invitational	Santo Domingo, Dominican Republic	
200m breaststroke	2:10.35	h	Carlos Claverie	Venezuela	9 August 2016	Olympic Games	Rio de Janeiro, Brazil	
50m butterfly	23.05	sf	Albert Subirats Altes	Venezuela	26 July 2009	World Championships	Rome, Italy	
100m butterfly	50.65	sf	Albert Subirats Altes	Venezuela	31 July 2009	World Championships	Rome, Italy	
200m butterfly	1:56.98	tt	Marcos Lavado	Venezuela	19 May 2017	Aquatic Centre International	Bridgetown, Barbados	
200m individual medley	2:01.87		Carlos Omaña	Venezuela	30 March 2016	South American Championships	Asunción, Paraguay	
400m individual medley	4:19.11		Carlos Omaña	Venezuela	16 July 2015	Pan American Games	Toronto, Canada	
4×100m freestyle relay	3:17.79	h	Crox Acuña (49.95); Octavio Alesi (49.69); Roberto Gómez (48.84); Albert Subirats Altes (49.31)	Venezuela	26 July 2009	World Championships	Rome, Italy	
4×200m freestyle relay	7:20.56	h	Daniele Tirabassi (1:49.77); Roberto Gómez (1:51.31); Alejandro Gómez (1:51.03); Crox Acuña (1:48.45)	Venezuela	31 July 2009	World Championships	Rome, Italy	
4×100m medley relay	3:36.88		Robinson Molina (56.55); Carlos Claverie (59.87); Albert Subirats (51.61); Cristian Quintero (48.85)	Venezuela	3 April 2016	South American Championships	Asunción, Paraguay	

Legend: # – Record awaiting ratification by Federación Venezolana de Deportes Acuáticos; WR – World record; AM – Americas record;
Records not set in finals: h – heat; sf – semifinal; r – relay 1st leg; rh – relay heat 1st leg; b – B final; † – en route to final mark; so – swim-off; tt – time trial

=== Women ===
Event	Time		Name	Club	Date	Meet	Location	Ref
50m freestyle	24.76	sf	Arlene Semeco	Venezuela	1 August 2009	World Championships	Rome, Italy	
100m freestyle	54.92	h	Arlene Semeco	Venezuela	30 July 2009	World Championships	Rome, Italy	
200m freestyle	1:59.08		Andreina Pinto	Venezuela	30 March 2016	South American Championships	Asunción, Paraguay	
400m freestyle	4:06.02	h	Andreina Pinto	Venezuela	28 July 2013	World Championships	Barcelona, Spain	
800m freestyle	8:25.93		Andreina Pinto	Gator Swim Club	12 May 2013	Arena Grand Prix	Charlotte, United States	
1500m freestyle	16:15.99	h	Andreina Pinto	Venezuela	29 July 2013	World Championships	Barcelona, Spain	
50m backstroke	28.72	h	Jeserik Pinto	Venezuela	20 July 2018	CAC Games	Barranquilla, Colombia	
100m backstroke	1:01.83	h	Carla González	Venezuela	12 February 2024	World Championships	Doha, Qatar	
200m backstroke	2:14.89	h	Erin Volcán	Venezuela	30 March 2007	World Championships	Melbourne, Australia	
50m breaststroke	31.71	h	Mercedes Toledo	EC Pinheiros	24 April 2025 (Note: by official result source; 21 April 2025 by FEVEDA source, a typo)	Brazil Swimming Trophy	Rio de Janeiro, Brazil	
100m breaststroke	1:09.58	h	Mercedes Toledo	EC Pinheiros	21 April 2025	Brazil Swimming Trophy	Rio de Janeiro, Brazil	
100m breaststroke	1:09.45	#	Marielys Martinez	Venezuela	28 July 2026	CAC Games	Santo Domingo, Dominican Republic	
200m breaststroke	2:30.72	h	Mercedes Toledo	Venezuela	23 June 2016	Bahamian Championships	Nassau, Bahamas	
50m butterfly	26.30	h	Lismar Lyon	Venezuela	1 August 2025	World Championships	Singapore, Singapore	
50m butterfly	25.63	h, #	Lismar Lyon	Delfines de Maria Auxiliadora	30 May 2026	Venezuelan Championships	Caracas, Venezuela	
100m butterfly	59.37		Isabella Páez	Venezuela	23 June 2016	Bahamian Championships	Nassau, Bahamas	
100m butterfly	58.90	#	Lismar Lyon	South Florida Aquatics	21 May 2026	TYR Pro Swim Series	Sacramento, United States	
200m butterfly	2:09.51		Andreina Pinto	Venezuela	14 July 2015	Pan American Games	Toronto, Canada	
200m individual medley	2:18.31		Andreina Pinto	Venezuela	19 November 2014	CAC Games	Veracruz, Mexico	
400m individual medley	4:48.02		Andreina Pinto	Gator Swim Club	2 June 2012	Santa Clara Grand Prix	Santa Clara, United States	
4×100m freestyle relay	3:46.24		Yennifer Marquez (56.60); Andreina Pinto (56.27); Jeserik Pinto (56.77); Arlene Semeco (56.60)	Venezuela	14 July 2015	Pan American Games	Toronto, Canada	
4×200m freestyle relay	8:13.10		Andreina Pinto (2:00.90); Andrea Garrido (2:02.74); Mercedes Toledo (2:05.48); Yennifer Marquez (2:03.98)	Venezuela	16 July 2015	Pan American Games	Toronto, Canada	
4×100m medley relay	4:11.15		Carla González (1:02.68); Mercedes Toledo (1:09.32); Lismar Lyon (1:01.02); María Yegres (58.13)	Venezuela	25 October 2023	Pan American Games	Santiago, Chile	

Legend: # – Record awaiting ratification by Federación Venezolana de Deportes Acuáticos; WR – World record; AM – Americas record;
Records not set in finals: h – heat; sf – semifinal; r – relay 1st leg; rh – relay heat 1st leg; b – B final; † – en route to final mark; so – swim-off; tt – time trial

=== Mixed relay ===
Event	Time	Name	Club	Date	Meet	Location	Ref
4×100m freestyle relay	3:33.88	Bryan Chavez (50.32); Andrea Santander (57.72); Jeserik Pinto (56.22); Alberto Mestre (49.62)	Venezuela	23 July 2018	CAC Games	Barranquilla, Colombia	
4×100m medley relay	3:53.58	Robinson Molina (56.90); Carlos Claverie (1:00.92); Isabella Paez (59.75); Jeserik Pinto (56.01)	Venezuela	20 July 2018	CAC Games	Barranquilla, Colombia	

Legend: # – Record awaiting ratification by Federación Venezolana de Deportes Acuáticos; WR – World record; AM – Americas record;
Records not set in finals: h – heat; so – swim-off

== Short course (25 m) ==
=== Men ===
Event	Time		Name	Club	Date	Meet	Location	Ref
50m freestyle	21.65	h	Cristian Quintero	Venezuela	4 December 2014	World Championships	Doha, Qatar	
100m freestyle	47.45		Cristian Quintero	Tokyo Frog Kings	31 October 2020	International Swimming League	Budapest, Hungary	
200m freestyle	1:42.40	h	Cristian Quintero	Venezuela	3 December 2014	World Championships	Doha, Qatar	
400m freestyle	3:39.06		Alfonso Mestre	Venezuela	16 December 2021	World Championships	Abu Dhabi, United Arab Emirates	
800m freestyle	7:53.36		Ricardo Monasterio	-	6 September 2005	Brazilian Championships	Taca Correios, Brazil	
1500m freestyle	14:49.84		Rafael Davila	ISLSW	16 December 2016	Ontario Junior International	Toronto, Canada	
50m backstroke	23.16		Albert Subirats Altes	Venezuela	6 December 2014	World Championships	Doha, Qatar	
100m backstroke	55.22		Sebastian Castillo	University Of Calgary Varsity	21 February 2020	U Sports Championships	Victoria, Canada	
200m backstroke	1:59.31		Sebastian Castillo	University Of Calgary Varsity	21 February 2020	U Sports Championships	Victoria, Canada	
50m breaststroke	26.64	h	Carlos Claverie	Venezuela	10 December 2016	World Championships	Windsor, Canada	
100m breaststroke	57.81	h	Carlos Claverie	Venezuela	6 December 2016	World Championships	Windsor, Canada	
200m breaststroke	2:05.84	h	Carlos Claverie	Venezuela	8 December 2016	World Championships	Windsor, Canada	
50m butterfly	22.40		Albert Subirats Altes	Venezuela	18 December 2010	World Championships	Dubai, United Arab Emirates	
100m butterfly	50.24		Albert Subirats Altes	Venezuela	16 December 2010	World Championships	Dubai, United Arab Emirates	
200m butterfly	1:53.94		Manuel Díaz	CR Flamengo	2 September 2026	José Finkel Trophy	São Paulo, Brazil	
100m individual medley	55.13		Carlos Herrera	Universidad Interamericana	30 November 2015	Puerto Rican Championships	San Juan, Puerto Rico	
200m individual medley	1:55.42		Manuel Díaz	CR Flamengo	1 September 2026	José Finkel Trophy	São Paulo, Brazil	
400m individual medley	4:14.50	tt	Leopoldo Andara	Venezuela	14 November 2009	World Cup	Berlin, Germany	
4×100m freestyle relay	3:21.23		Diego Henao (50.44); Alejandro Carrizo (50.07); Micky Lilinthal (51.57); Francisco Sánchez (49.15)	Venezuela	1995	World Championships	Rio de Janeiro, Brazil	
4×200m freestyle relay	7:08.43	h	Cristian Quintero (1:45.33); Daniele Tirabassi (1:46.18); Roberto Gómez (1:48.20); Alejandro Gómez (1:48.72)	Venezuela	16 December 2010	World Championships	Dubai, United Arab Emirates	
4×100m medley relay	3:58.80		Roberto Penott; Hugo Araya; Richard Farra; Luis Bello	UCV	16 October 2010	Speedo Open International	Lima, Peru	

Legend: # – Record awaiting ratification by Federación Venezolana de Deportes Acuáticos; WR – World record;
Records not set in finals: h – heat; sf – semifinal; r – relay 1st leg; rh – relay heat 1st leg; b – B final; † – en route to final mark; so – swim-off; tt – time trial

=== Women ===
Event	Time		Name	Club	Date	Meet	Location	Ref
50 m freestyle	24.53		Arlene Semeco	Venezuela	11 November 2008	World Cup	Stockholm, Sweden	
100 m freestyle	54.74	r	María Yegres	CN Barcelona	9 December 2023	226ers Trophy	Castellón de la Plana, Spain	
200 m freestyle	1:57.02	r	María Yegres	C.N. Barcelona	19 December 2025	Spanish Club Cup Division of Honor	Sabadell, Spain	
400 m freestyle	4:08.95		María Yegres	C.N. Barcelona	21 December 2024	Spanish Club Cup Division of Honor	Sabadell, Spain	
800 m freestyle	8:26.31		Andreina Pinto	Venezuela	16 December 2010	World Championships	Dubai, United Arab Emirates	
1500 m freestyle	17:05.15		Annagracia Bonsanti	-	16 July 2014	Venezuelan Championships	Barquisimeto, Venezuela	
50m backstroke	27.99	h	Jeserik Pinto	Venezuela	14 December 2018	World Championships	Hangzhou, China	
100m backstroke	1:02.09	h	Jeserik Pinto	Venezuela	15 December 2010	World Championships	Dubai, United Arab Emirates	
200m backstroke	2:16.73		Elimar Barrios	-	16 July 2014	Venezuelan Championships	Barquisimeto, Venezuela	
50m breaststroke	30.62	h	Mercedes Toledo	EC Pinheiros	1 September 2026	José Finkel Trophy	São Paulo, Brazil	
100m breaststroke	1:06.85		Mercedes Toledo	EC Pinheiros	3 September 2026	José Finkel Trophy	São Paulo, Brazil	
200m breaststroke	2:26.82		Mercedes Toledo	EC Pinheiros	31 August 2026	José Finkel Trophy	São Paulo, Brazil	
50m butterfly	26.31	h	Lismar Lyon	Venezuela	24 October 2025	World Cup	Toronto, Canada	
100m butterfly	58.66	h	Lismar Lyon	Venezuela	25 October 2025	World Cup	Toronto, Canada	
200m butterfly	2:11.17	tt	María Yegres	CN Barcelona	16 December 2022	Spanish Championships	Sabadell, Spain	
100m individual medley	1:01.83		Mercedes Toledo	EC Pinheiros	4 September 2026	José Finkel Trophy	São Paulo, Brazil	
200m individual medley	2:19.37	h	Mercedes Toledo	ADI	14 September 2022	José Finkel Trophy	Recife, Brazil	
400m individual medley	5:05.49		Karelis Clemant	-	July 2014	Venezuelan Championships	Barquisimeto, Venezuela	
4×100m freestyle relay	3:50.65	h	Ximena Vilar (57.77); Andreina Pinto (57.42); Eliana Barrios (58.05); Jeserik Pinto (57.41)	Venezuela	18 December 2010	World Championships	Dubai, United Arab Emirates	
4×200m freestyle relay	8:45.90		Annagrazia Bonsanti; Claudia Badiola; Lisette Texeira; Andrea Garrido	Emil Friedman	October 2010	Speedo Open International	Lima, Peru	
4×100m medley relay	4:13.48	h	Jeserik Pinto (1:03.33); Daniela Victoria (1:11.10); Eilimar Barrios (1:01.97); Ximena Vilar (57.08)	Venezuela	17 December 2010	World Championships	Dubai, United Arab Emirates	

Legend: # – Record awaiting ratification by Federación Venezolana de Deportes Acuáticos; WR – World record;
Records not set in finals: h – heat; sf – semifinal; r – relay 1st leg; rh – relay heat 1st leg; b – B final; † – en route to final mark; so – swim-off; tt – time trial
