= Swimming at the 2019 Pan American Games – Mixed 4 × 100 metre medley relay =

Mixed 4 × 100 metre medley relay at the 2019 Pan American Games
- Venues: Villa Deportiva Nacional, VIDENA
- Dates: August 8 (preliminaries and finals)
- Competitors: 62 from 10 nations
- Winning time: 3:48.61

Medalists
Gold medal	Guilherme Guido; João Gomes Júnior; Giovanna Diamante; Larissa Oliveira; Leonardo de Deus; Jhennifer Conceição; Vinicius Lanza; Manuella Lyrio	Brazil
Silver medal	Javier Acevedo; James Dergousoff; Danielle Hanus; Alexia Zevnik; Haley Black; Kyla Leibel	Canada
Bronze medal	Andrea Berrino; Julia Sebastián; Santiago Grassi; Federico Grabich; Florencia Perotti; Virginia Bardach; Roberto Strelkov; Lautaro Rodríguez	Argentina

The mixed 4 × 100 metre medley relay competition of the swimming events at the 2019 Pan American Games are scheduled to be held August 8, 2019 at the Villa Deportiva Nacional Videna cluster.

The United States team originally won the gold medal, however it was disqualified for two alleged breaststroke kicks off the turn. USA Swimming voiced their disagreement with the decision, but they were not allowed to appeal.

== Records ==
Prior to this competition, the existing World Record was as follows:

World record	United States (USA); Matt Grevers (52.32); Lilly King (1:04.15); Caeleb Dressel (49.92); Simone Manuel (52.17)	3:38.56	Budapest, Hungary	July 26, 2017

== Results ==
KEY:	q	Fastest non-qualifiers	Q	Qualified	GR	Games record	NR	National record	PB	Personal best	SB	Seasonal best

=== Heats ===
The first round was held on August 8.

Rank	Heat	Lane	Nation	Swimmers	Time	Notes
1	2	4	United States	Isabelle Stadden (59.69); Kevin Cordes (1:00.59); Matthew Josa (52.30); Meaghan Raab (55.69)	3:48.27	Q, GR
2	1	6	Brazil	Leonardo de Deus (55.17); Jhennifer Conceição (1:08.27); Vinicius Lanza (52.84); Manuella Lyrio (56.14)	3:52.42	Q
3	1	4	Canada	Javier Acevedo (55.77); James Dergousoff (1:03.45); Haley Black (59.43); Kyla Leibel (55.62)	3:54.27	Q
4	1	3	Colombia	Anthony Rincón (56.75); Jorge Murillo (1:01.28); Valentina Becerra (1:01.17); Sirena Rowe (57.26)	3:56.46	Q
5	2	5	Mexico	Celia Pulido (1:03.31); Esther González (1:11.68); Lorena González Mendoza (1:04.00); José Martínez (51.60)	4:01.65	Q
6	2	6	Cuba	Armando Barrera (57.50); Julio Calero (1:05.05); Mateo González (55.06); Elisbet Gámez (56.48)	4:03.03	Q
7	2	3	Argentina	Florencia Perotti (1:05.44); Virginia Bardach (1:13.15); Roberto Strelkov (53.57); Lautaro Rodríguez (50.98)	4:03.14	Q
8	1	5	Venezuela	Mayerly Escalante Hernandez (1:06.56); Marco Guarente (1:02.20); Bryan Chávez (55.25); Fabiana Pesce (59.17)	4:03.18	Q
9	1	2	Panama	Carolina Cermelli (1:05.39); Édgar Crespo (1:04.63); Bernhard Christianson (56.15); Ireyra Tamayo (59.94)	4:06.11	
10	2	2	Peru	McKenna DeBever (1:05.13); Paula Tamashiro (1:12.35); Javier Tang Juy (55.91); Miguel Zavaleta Castaneda (53.07)	4:06.46	

=== Final ===
The final round was also held on August 8.

Rank	Lane	Nation	Swimmers	Time	Notes
1st place, gold medalist(s)	5	Brazil	Guilherme Guido (54.68); João Gomes Júnior (59.32); Giovanna Diamante (59.33); Larissa Oliveira (55.28)	3:48.61	
2nd place, silver medalist(s)	3	Canada	Javier Acevedo (55.03); James Dergousoff (1:01.71); Danielle Hanus 58.71); Alexia Zevnik (54.52)	3:49.97	
3rd place, bronze medalist(s)	1	Argentina	Andrea Berrino (1:02.61); Julia Sebastián (1:07.55); Santiago Grassi (51.65); Federico Grabich (48.72)	3:50.53	NR
4	2	Mexico	Celia Pulido (1:03.42); Melissa Rodríguez (1:07.92); Long Gutiérrez (53.29); Jorge Iga (49.22)	3:53.85	
5	6	Colombia	Omar Pinzón (56.00); Jorge Murillo (1:01.06); Valentina Becerra (1:00.72); Sirena Rowe (57.44)	3:55.22	
6	8	Venezuela	Carla González ( 1:05.35); Marco Guarente (1:02.44); Isabella Páez (1:01.01); Cristian Quintero (49.30)	3:58.10	
7	7	Cuba	Armando Barrera (57.39); Julio Calero (1:03.74); Lorena González Mendoza (1:03.25); Elisbet Gámez (56.42)	4:00.80	
	4	United States	Phoebe Bacon (59.56); Cody Miller; Tom Shields; Margo Geer	DSQ	
