= Swimming at the 2018 Central American and Caribbean Games =

- Venue: Aquatic Complex
- Location: (Colombia) Barranquilla
- Dates: 20–29 July

The swimming competition at the 2018 Central American and Caribbean Games was held at the Aquatic Complex in Barranquilla, Colombia from 20 to 25 July. Open water swimming events were held on 28 and 29 July at Puerto Velero.

== Medal summary ==
=== Men's events ===
Event	Gold		Silver		Bronze	
50m freestyle	Renzo Tjon-A-Joe; Suriname	22.18; GR, NR	Dylan Carter; Trinidad and Tobago	22.39	Alberto Mestre; Venezuela	22.47
100m freestyle	Dylan Carter; Trinidad and Tobago	48.95; GR	Mikel Schreuders; Aruba	49.17; NR	Jorge Iga; Mexico	49.28
200m freestyle	Jorge Iga; Mexico	1:47.19; GR, NR	Long Gutiérrez; Mexico	1:48.09	Mikel Schreuders; Aruba	1:48.63; NR
400m freestyle	Marcelo Acosta; El Salvador	3:50.61; GR	Ricardo Vargas; Mexico	3:51.52; NR	Rafael Dávila; Venezuela	3:51.90
1500m freestyle	Ricardo Vargas; Mexico	15:18.33; GR	Marcelo Acosta; El Salvador	15:31.36	Rafael Dávila; Venezuela	15:37.10
50m backstroke	Dylan Carter; Trinidad and Tobago	24.83; GR, NR	Robinson Molina; Venezuela	25.25	David McLeod; Trinidad and Tobago	25.55
100m backstroke	Omar Pinzón; Colombia	54.88; GR, =NR	Armando Barrera; Cuba	55.48	Robinson Molina; Venezuela	55.88
200m backstroke	Andy Song; Mexico	1:59.95; GR, NR	Armando Barrera; Cuba	2:01.61	Omar Pinzón; Colombia	2:01.91
50m breaststroke	Édgar Crespo; Panama	27.56; GR	Mauro Castillo; Mexico	27.92	Carlos Mahecha; Colombia	27.93
100m breaststroke	Jorge Murillo; Colombia	1:00.37; GR	Mauro Castillo; Mexico	1:00.77	Miguel de Lara; Mexico	1:00.91
200m breaststroke	Miguel de Lara; Mexico	2:11.77; GR, NR	Mauro Castillo; Mexico	2:12.31	Carlos Claverie; Venezuela	2:12.79
50m butterfly	Dylan Carter; Trinidad and Tobago	23.11; GR, NR	Luis Martínez; Guatemala	23.26	Joshua Romany; Trinidad and Tobago	24.05
100m butterfly	Luis Martínez; Guatemala	52.20; GR	Long Gutiérrez; Mexico	52.83	Esnaider Reales; Colombia	52.95 NR
200m butterfly	Jonathan Gómez; Colombia	1:57.03; GR	Héctor Ruvalcaba; Mexico	1:59.13	Luis Vega Torres; Cuba	1:59.23
200m individual medley	Jarod Arroyo; Puerto Rico	2:02.37; NR	Carlos Claverie; Venezuela	2:03.06	Héctor Ruvalcaba; Mexico	2:03.48
400m individual medley	Ricardo Vargas; Mexico	4:19.98; GR, NR	Jarod Arroyo; Puerto Rico	4:21.10	Luis Vega; Cuba	4:25.49
4 × 100 m freestyle relay	Mexico; Daniel Ramírez (49.79); Horus Briseño (50.16); Jorge Iga (49.23); Long Gutiérrez (49.42); Daniel Torres^{[a]} Mateo González^{[a]}	3:18.60; GR, NR	Venezuela; Jesús López (50.07); Robinson Molina (50.46); Bryan Chávez (50.60); Alberto Mestre (49.30)	3:20.43	Trinidad and Tobago; Dylan Carter (48.79) GR; Jabari Baptiste (51.74); David McLeod (51.44); Joshua Romany (50.86)	3:22.83; NR
4 × 200 m freestyle relay	Venezuela; Rafael Dávila (1:49.37); Andy Arteta (1:51.95); Bryan Chávez (1:51.40); Marcos Lavado (1:51.46)	7:24.18; GR	Mexico; Long Gutiérrez (1:55.11); Ricardo Vargas (1:51.51); José Martínez (1:50.41); Jorge Iga (1:49.91)	7:26.94	Puerto Rico; Christian Bayo (1:51.22); Jarod Arroyo (1:51.67); Andres Solivan (1:52.58); Yeziel Morales (1:51.82)	7:27.29; NR
4 × 100 m medley relay	Mexico; Andy Song (56.46); Mauro Castillo (1:01.07); Long Gutiérrez (53.74); Jorge Iga (49.14); Miguel de Lara^{[a]} Mateo González^{[a]}	3:40.41; GR, NR	Colombia; Omar Pinzón (55.87); Carlos Mahecha (1:01.32); Esnaider Reales (53.15); Cardenio Fernández (50.32)	3:40.66; NR	Venezuela; Robinson Molina (56.21); Carlos Claverie (1:01.03); Marcos Lavado (54.29); Alberto Mestre (49.14); Juan Sequera^{[a]} Bryan Chávez^{[a]}	3:40.67
10 km open water	Wilder Carreño; Venezuela	1:59:21.0	Diego Vera; Venezuela	1:59:24.0	Alfredo Villa; Mexico	2:00:28.0

^{a} Swimmers who participated in the heats only and received medals.

=== Women's events ===
Event	Gold		Silver		Bronze	
50m freestyle	Isabella Arcila; Colombia	25.11; GR, NR	Liliana Ibáñez; Mexico	25.15; NR	Alia Atkinson; Jamaica	25.47; NR
100m freestyle	Isabella Arcila; Colombia	55.21 NR	Joanna Evans; Bahamas	55.29	Liliana Ibáñez; Mexico	55.39; NR
200m freestyle	Joanna Evans; Bahamas	1:58.03; GR, NR	Elisbet Gámez; Cuba	1:58.55	Liliana Ibáñez; Mexico	2:01.36
400m freestyle	Joanna Evans; Bahamas	4:11.15; GR	Allyson Macías; Mexico	4:14.74	Helena Moreno; Costa Rica	4:15.51
800m freestyle	Joanna Evans; Bahamas	8:44.53	Allyson Macías; Mexico	8:45.92	Helena Moreno; Costa Rica	8:48.11
50m backstroke	Isabella Arcila; Colombia	28.11; GR NR	Fernanda González; Mexico	28.57; NR	Mathilde Jean; Guadeloupe	28.60
100m backstroke	Isabella Arcila; Colombia	1:01.30; GR	Fernanda González; Mexico	1:01.34	Krystal Lara; Dominican Republic	1:01.39
200m backstroke	Kristen Romano; Puerto Rico	2:13.70; NR	Krystal Lara; Dominican Republic	2:13.82; NR	Brenda Díaz; Mexico	2:17.40
50m breaststroke	Alia Atkinson; Jamaica	30.19; GR	Melissa Rodríguez; Mexico	31.20; NR	Mercedes Toledo; Venezuela	31.99
100m breaststroke	Alia Atkinson; Jamaica	1:06.83; GR	Melissa Rodríguez; Mexico	1:07.80; NR	Esther González; Mexico	1:10.60
200m breaststroke	Melissa Rodríguez; Mexico	2:25.60; GR, NR	Esther González; Mexico	2:29.72	Margaret Higgs; Bahamas	2:30.83; NR
50m butterfly	Alia Atkinson; Jamaica	26.60	Jeserik Pinto; Venezuela	26.76	Liliana Ibáñez; Mexico	27.08
100m butterfly	Miriam Guevara; Mexico	59.31; GR, NR	Isabella Páez; Venezuela	1:00.04	Alia Atkinson; Jamaica	1:00.13
200m butterfly	Isabella Páez; Venezuela	2:11.26	Diana Luna; Mexico	2:11.84	María Mata; Mexico	2:12.25
200m individual medley	Monika González; Mexico	2:16.27; GR	Esther González; Mexico	2:16.69	Kristen Romano; Puerto Rico	2:17.01
400m individual medley	Kristen Romano; Puerto Rico	4:46.31; GR	Joanna Evans; Bahamas	4:50.38; NR	Monika González; Mexico	4:52.13
4 × 100 m freestyle relay	Mexico; Monika González (57.23); Fernanda González (57.49); Tayde Revilak (57.40); Liliana Ibáñez (54.95)	3:47.07; GR, NR	Colombia; Sirena Rowe (57.11); Karen Durango (58.14); Daniela Gutiérrez (57.64); Isabella Arcila (55.00)	3:47.89	Venezuela; Carla González (57.31); Andrea Garrido (58.84); Andrea Santander (57.14); Jeserik Pinto (56.13)	3:49.42
4 × 200 m freestyle relay	Mexico; Monika González (2:03.38); Allyson Macias (2:02.75); María Mata (2:03.10); Liliana Ibáñez (2:03.07)	8:12.30; GR	Colombia; María Álvarez (2:03.94); María Román (2:06.84); Daniela Gutiérrez (2:06.93); Karen Durango (2:04.01)	8:21.72	Cuba; Lorena González (2:04.53); Mayte González (2:06.90); Andrea Becali (2:10.89); Elisbet Gámez(1:59.76)	8:22.08 NR
4 × 100 m medley relay	Mexico; Fernanda González (1:01.88); Melissa Rodríguez (1:08.88); Miriam Guevara (1:00.57); Liliana Ibáñez (57.66)	4:08.99; GR	Venezuela; Carla González (1:04.40); Mercedes Toledo (1:10.38); Isabella Páez (1:00.13); Jeserik Pinto (56.85)	4:11.76	Colombia; Isabella Arcila (1:01.51); Salomé Cataño (1:14.73); Valentina Becerra (1:00.40); Sirena Rowe (57.09)	4:13.73
10 km open water	María Mata; Mexico	2:08:41.0	María Sandoval; Mexico	2:09:00.1	Ruthseli Aponte; Venezuela	2:09:03.9

=== Mixed events ===
Event	Gold		Silver		Bronze	
4 × 100 m freestyle relay	Mexico; Jorge Iga (49.53); Liliana Ibáñez (54.81); Monika González (57.55); Long Gutiérrez (49.77); Daniel Ramírez^{[b]} Tayde Revilak^{[b]}	3:31.66; GR, NR	Colombia; Cardenio Fernández (50.66); Isabella Arcila (55.29); Sirena Rowe (56.83); Esnaider Reales (51.10); David Arias^{[b]} Daniela Gutiérrez^{[b]}	3:33.88; NR	Not awarded	
4 × 100 m freestyle relay	Mexico; Jorge Iga (49.53); Liliana Ibáñez (54.81); Monika González (57.55); Long Gutiérrez (49.77); Daniel Ramírez^{[b]} Tayde Revilak^{[b]}	3:31.66; GR, NR	Venezuela; Bryan Chávez (50.32); Andrea Santander (57.72); Jeserik Pinto (56.22); Alberto Mestre (49.62); Carla González^{[b]}	3:33.88; NR	Not awarded	
4 × 100 m medley relay	Mexico; Fernanda González (1:02.07); Mauro Castillo (59.90); Long Gutiérrez (52.88); Liliana Ibáñez (54.76); Andy Song^{[b]} Miriam Guevara^{[b]}	3:49.61; GR, NR	Colombia; Omar Pinzón (55.30); Jorge Murillo (59.97); Valentina Becerra (1:00.76); Isabella Arcila (54.37); Sirena Rowe^{[b]}	3:50.40; NR	Venezuela; Robinson Molina (56.90); Carlos Claverie (1:00.92); Isabella Paez (59.75); Jeserik Pinto (56.01); Carla González^{[b]}	3:53.58; NR

^{b} Swimmers who participated in the heats only and received medals.

== Medal table ==
* Host nation (Colombia)

Rank	Nation	Gold	Silver	Bronze	Total
1	Mexico (MEX)	16	19	11	46
2	Colombia (COL)*	7	5	4	16
3	Venezuela (VEN)	3	8	10	21
4	Bahamas (BAH)	3	2	1	6
5	Trinidad and Tobago (TTO)	3	1	3	7
6	Puerto Rico (PUR)	3	1	2	6
7	Jamaica (JAM)	3	0	2	5
8	El Salvador (ESA)	1	1	0	2
8	Guatemala (GUA)	1	1	0	2
10	Panama (PAN)	1	0	0	1
10	Suriname (SUR)	1	0	0	1
12	Cuba (CUB)	0	3	3	6
13	Aruba (ARU)	0	1	1	2
13	Dominican Republic (DOM)	0	1	1	2
15	Costa Rica (CRC)	0	0	2	2
16	Guadeloupe (GLP)	0	0	1	1
Totals (16 entries)		42	43	41	126
