= List of Central American and Caribbean Games records in swimming =

This a listing of fastest swimming times achieved at the Central American and Caribbean Games (CACs). All times are swum in a long-course (50m) pool.

These records are maintained by CCCAN, which oversee the swimming portion of the CACs.

== Men ==
Event	Time		Name	Club	Date	Meet	Location	Ref
50m freestyle	21.87		Dylan Carter	Trinidad and Tobago	29 June 2023	2023 Games	San Salvador, El Salvador	
100m freestyle	48.49		Dylan Carter	Trinidad and Tobago	24 June 2023	2023 Games	San Salvador, El Salvador	
200m freestyle	1:47.08		Raekwon Noel	Guyana	1 August 2026	2026 Games	Santo Domingo, Dominican Republic	
400m freestyle	3:50.61		Marcelo Acosta	El Salvador	23 July 2018	2018 Games	Barranquilla, Colombia	
800m freestyle	7:58.07		Paulo Strehlke	Mexico	30 July 2026	2026 Games	Santo Domingo, Dominican Republic	
1500m freestyle	15:03.87		Paulo Strehlke	Mexico	28 July 2026	2026 Games	Santo Domingo, Dominican Republic	
50m backstroke	24.63	h	Marcus Reyes-Gentry	Mexico	30 July 2026	2026 Games	Santo Domingo, Dominican Republic	
100m backstroke	53.68	r	Marcus Reyes-Gentry	Mexico	1 August 2026	2026 Games	Santo Domingo, Dominican Republic	
200m backstroke	1:58.62		Humberto Nájera	Mexico	1 August 2026	2026 Games	Santo Domingo, Dominican Republic	
50m breaststroke	27.51	=	Miguel de Lara	Mexico	27 June 2023	2023 Games	San Salvador, El Salvador	
50m breaststroke	27.51	=	Mikel Schreuders	Aruba	27 June 2023	2023 Games	San Salvador, El Salvador	
100m breaststroke	1:00.23		Miguel de Lara	Mexico	25 June 2023	2023 Games	San Salvador, El Salvador	
200m breaststroke	2:10.85		Miguel de Lara	Mexico	29 June 2023	2023 Games	San Salvador, El Salvador	
50m butterfly	23.11		Dylan Carter	Trinidad and Tobago	22 July 2018	2018 Games	Barranquilla, Colombia	
100m butterfly	52.20		Luis Martínez	Guatemala	24 July 2018	2018 Games	Barranquilla, Colombia	
200m butterfly	1:56.82		Raekwon Noel	Guyana	29 July 2026	2026 Games	Santo Domingo, Dominican Republic	
200m individual medley	1:59.35		Raekwon Noel	Guyana	28 July 2026	2026 Games	Santo Domingo, Dominican Republic	
400m individual medley	4:17.68		Erick Gordillo	Guatemala	29 July 2026	2026 Games	Santo Domingo, Dominican Republic	
4 × 100 m freestyle relay	3:16.91		Liam Carrington (49.30); Dylan Carter (48.47); Zerek Wilson (49.81); Nikoli Blackman (49.33)	Trinidad and Tobago	29 July 2026	2026 Games	Santo Domingo, Dominican Republic	
4 × 200 m freestyle relay	7:15.60		David Medina (1:49.86); Daniel Saborio (1:48.90); Andres Dupont (1:48.84); Jorge Iga (1:48.00)	Mexico	28 July 2026	2026 Games	Santo Domingo, Dominican Republic	
4 × 100 m medley relay	3:36.96		Marcus Reyes-Gentry (53.68); Andres Puente (1:01.33); Jorge Iga (53.42); Andres Dupont (48.53)	Mexico	1 August 2026	2026 Games	Santo Domingo, Dominican Republic	

Legend: # – Record awaiting ratification by CCCAN; WR – World record; AM – Americas record; e – equalled existing record;
Records not set in finals: h – heat; sf – semifinal; r – relay 1st leg; rh – relay heat 1st leg; b – B final; † – en route to final mark; so – swim-off; tt – time trial

== Women ==
Event	Time	Name	Club	Date	Meet	Location	Ref
50 m freestyle	24.89	Sirena Rowe	Colombia	28 July 2026	2026 Games	Santo Domingo, Dominican Republic	
100 m freestyle	54.87	Arianna Vanderpool-Wallace	Bahamas	18 November 2014	2014 Games	Veracruz, Mexico	
200 m freestyle	1:58.03	Joanna Evans	Bahamas	21 July 2018	2018 Games	Barranquilla, Colombia	
400 m freestyle	4:11.15	Joanna Evans	Bahamas	20 July 2018	2018 Games	Barranquilla, Colombia	
800 m freestyle	8:39.49	Andreina Pinto	Venezuela	19 November 2014	2014 Games	Veracruz, Mexico	
1500 m freestyle	17:01.44	Yuritzi Salgado	Mexico	30 July 2026	2026 Games	Santo Domingo, Dominican Republic	
50 m backstroke	28.11	Isabella Arcila	Colombia	20 July 2018	2018 Games	Barranquilla, Colombia	
100 m backstroke	1:00.83	Celia Pulido	Mexico	31 July 2026	2026 Games	Santo Domingo, Dominican Republic	
200 m backstroke	2:10.68	Daniela Linares	Mexico	1 August 2026	2026 Games	Santo Domingo, Dominican Republic	
50m breaststroke	30.19	Alia Atkinson	Jamaica	22 July 2018	2018 Games	Barranquilla, Colombia	
100m breaststroke	1:06.83	Alia Atkinson	Jamaica	20 July 2018	2018 Games	Barranquilla, Colombia	
200m breaststroke	2:25.60	Melissa Rodríguez	Mexico	23 July 2018	2018 Games	Barranquilla, Colombia	
50m butterfly	26.38	Marina Spadoni	El Salvador	1 August 2026	2026 Games	Santo Domingo, Dominican Republic	
100m butterfly	58.79	Kristen Romano	Puerto Rico	30 July 2026	2026 Games	Santo Domingo, Dominican Republic	
200m butterfly	2:11.25	Rita Medrano	Mexico	23 July 2010	2010 Games	Mayagüez, Puerto Rico	
200m individual medley	2:12.16	Kristen Romano	Puerto Rico	28 July 2026	2026 Games	Santo Domingo, Dominican Republic	
400m individual medley	4:44.87	Kristen Romano	Puerto Rico	29 July 2026	2026 Games	Santo Domingo, Dominican Republic	
4 × 100 m freestyle relay	3:45.18	Lorena González (56.91); Andrea Becali (56.03); Laurent Estrada (57.31); Elisbet Gámez (54.93)	Cuba	28 June 2023	2023 Games	San Salvador, El Salvador	
4 × 200 m freestyle relay	8:10.17	Lorena González (2:03.96); Andrea Becali (2:01.92); Laurent Estrada (2:06.02); Elisbet Gámez (1:59.57)	Cuba	29 June 2023	2023 Games	San Salvador, El Salvador	
4 × 100 m medley relay	4:05.25	Daniela Linares (1:01.64); Melissa Rodríguez (1:08.72); Miranda Grana (58.68); Celia Pulido (56.21)	Mexico	1 August 2026	2026 Games	Santo Domingo, Dominican Republic	

Legend: # – Record awaiting ratification by CCCAN; WR – World record; AM – Americas record; e – equalled existing record;
Records not set in finals: h – heat; sf – semifinal; r – relay 1st leg; rh – relay heat 1st leg; b – B final; † – en route to final mark; so – swim-off; tt – time trial

== Mixed ==
Event	Time	Name	Club	Date	Meet	Location	Ref
4 × 100 m freestyle relay	3:30.87	Jorge Iga (49.73); Andres Dupont (48.70); Susana Hernández (57.35); Celia Pulido (55.09)	Mexico	31 July 2026	2026 Games	Santo Domingo, Dominican Republic	
4 × 100 m medley relay	3:49.61	Fernanda González (1:02.07); Mauro Castillo (59.90); Long Gutiérrez (52.88); Liliana Ibáñez (54.76)	Mexico	20 July 2018	2018 Games	Barranquilla, Colombia	

Legend: # – Record awaiting ratification by CCCAN; WR – World record; AM – Americas record; e – equalled existing record;
Records not set in finals: h – heat; b – B final; so – swim-off

== See also ==
- Central American and Caribbean Swimming Championships
- List of Americas records in swimming
- List of South American records in swimming
