= 2016 South American Swimming Championships =

International swimming competition

XLIII South American Swimming Championships
- Host city: Asunción, Paraguay
- Date: 30 March – 3 April 2016
- Nations: 12
- Events: 42

The 43rd South American Swimming Championships were held between March 30 and April 3, 2016, in Asunción, Paraguay.

== Participating countries ==
Countries which sent teams were:

- Argentina
- Bolivia
- Brazil
- Chile
- Colombia
- Ecuador
- Panama
- Paraguay
- Peru
- Suriname
- Uruguay
- Venezuela
- Guyana

== Results ==
=== Men's events ===
Event	Gold		Silver		Bronze	
50 m freestyle	Federico Grabich (ARG)	22.55	Guido Buscaglia (ARG)	22.58	Cristian Quintero (VEN)	22.77
100 m freestyle	Federico Grabich (ARG)	49.59	Cristian Quintero (VEN)	49.69	Guido Buscaglia (ARG)	49.98
200 m freestyle	Federico Grabich (ARG)	1:47.39	Luis Altamir Melo (BRA)	1:48.62	Marcos Lavado (VEN)	1:50.03
400 m freestyle	Luis Altamir Melo (BRA)	3:51.33	Martin Naidich (ARG)	3:52.23	Cristian Quintero (VEN)	3:52.24
800 m freestyle	Esteban Enderica (ECU)	7:58.46	Martin Naidich (ARG)	7:59.18	Rafael Davila (VEN)	8:02.66
1500 m freestyle	Esteban Enderica (ECU)	15:08.57 AR	Martin Carrizo (ARG)	15:16.67	Alejandro Gomez (VEN)	15:31.69
50 m backstroke	Guilherme Guido (BRA)	25.19	Robinson Molina (VEN)	25.74	Fábio Santi (BRA)	25.85
100 m backstroke	Guilherme Guido (BRA)	53.40	Fábio Santi (BRA)	55.11	Omar Pinzón (COL)	55.49
200 m backstroke	Fábio Santi (BRA)	1:59.47	Omar Pinzón (COL)	2:00.03	Matias Lopez (PAR)	2:00.13
50 m breaststroke	Raphael de Oliveira (BRA)	27.97	Martin Melconián (URU)	28.01	Jorge Murillo (COL)	28.04
100 m breaststroke	Carlos Claverie (VEN)	1:00.82	Raphael de Oliveira (BRA)	1:01.37	Jorge Murillo (COL)	1:01.88
200 m breaststroke	Carlos Claverie (VEN)	2:10.44	Carlos Mahecha (COL)	2:16.57	Henrique Barbosa (BRA)	2:16.87
50 m butterfly	Santiago Grassi (ARG)	24.03	Benjamin Hockin (PAR)	24.10	Marcos Barale (ARG)	24.17
100 m butterfly	Albert Subirats (VEN)	51.90	Santiago Grassi (ARG)	52.44	Marcos Barale (ARG)	53.87
200 m butterfly	Luis Altamir Melo (BRA)	1;58.39	Marcos Lavado (VEN)	1:59.39	Leonardo de Deus (BRA)	1:59.63
200 m I.M.	Henrique Rodrigues (BRA)	2:01.18	Carlos Omaña (VEN)	2:01.87	Ícaro Pereira (BRA)	2:03.05
400 m I.M.	Brandonn Almeida (BRA)	4:17.78	Carlos Omaña (VEN)	4:23.11	Matias Lopez (PAR)	4:27.23
4 × 100 m freestyle relay	Argentina; Federico Grabich; Matias Aguilera; Lautaro Rodriguez; Guido Buscaglia	3:17.54	Venezuela; Cristian Quintero; Daniele Tirabassi; Roberto Goméz; Albert Subirats	3:19.50	Brazil; Alan Vitória; Henrique Rodrigues; Luis Altamir Melo; Pedro Henrique Silva	3:20.60
4 × 200 m freestyle relay	Brazil; Giovanny Lima; Leonardo de Deus; Brandonn Almeida; Luis Altamir Melo	7:24.42	Venezuela; Cristian Quintero; Marcos Lavado; Carlos Omaña; Andres Doria	7:25.69	Colombia; Omar Pinzón; Esnaider Reales; David Arias; David Céspedes	7:37.02
4 × 100 m medley relay	Venezuela; Robinson Molina; Carlos Claverie; Albert Subirats; Cristian Quintero	3:36.88	Brazil; Guilherme Guido; Henrique Barbosa; Leonardo de Deus; Pedro Henrique Silva	3:39.17	Argentina; Federico Grabich; Rodrigo Frutos; Santiago Grassi; Guido Buscaglia	3:40.01

Legend: CR – Championship record; NR – National record

=== Women's events ===
Event	Gold		Silver		Bronze	
50 m freestyle	Etiene Medeiros (BRA)	24.80	Graciele Herrmann (BRA)	25.37	Karen Torrez (BOL)	25.67
100 m freestyle	Etiene Medeiros (BRA)	54.83	Manuella Lyrio (BRA)	55.07	Isabella Arcila (COL)	56.55
200 m freestyle	Manuella Lyrio (BRA)	1:58.94	Andreina Pinto (VEN)	1:59.08	Jessica Cavalheiro (BRA)	2:00.68
400 m freestyle	Andreina Pinto (VEN)	4:07.17	Manuella Lyrio (BRA)	4:10.62	Delfina Pignatiello (ARG)	4:13.75
800 m freestyle	Andreina Pinto (VEN)	8:32.31	Cecilia Biagioli (ARG)	8:42.82	Samanta Salinas (ECU)	8:47.20
1500 m freestyle	Cecilia Biagioli (ARG)	16:37.85	Samanta Salinas (ECU)	16:44.44	Daniela Coello (PER)	17:33.37
50 m backstroke	Andrea Berrino (ARG)	28.11	Etiene Medeiros (BRA)	28.17	Ana Giulia Zortea (BRA); Jeserik Pinto (VEN)	28.98
100 m backstroke	Etiene Medeiros (BRA)	1:00.38	Andrea Berrino (ARG)	1:00.47	Natalia de Luccas (BRA)	1:01.94
200 m backstroke	Andrea Berrino (ARG)	2:13.47	Carolina Colorado Henao (COL)	2:15.03	Florencia Perotti (ARG)	2:15.30
50 m breaststroke	Macarena Ceballos (ARG)	31.93	Julia Sebastián (ARG)	32.13	Mercedes Toledo (VEN)	32.36
100 m breaststroke	Macarena Ceballos (ARG)	1:08.46	Julia Sebastián (ARG)	1:09.33	Pamela Souza (BRA)	1:11.05
200 m breaststroke	Julia Sebastián (ARG)	2:27.03 AR	Macarena Ceballos (BRA)	2:30.08	Mercedes Toledo (VEN)	2:31.61
50 m butterfly	Daiene Dias (BRA)	26.53	Daynara de Paula (BRA)	26.68	Maria Belen Diaz (ARG)	27.37
100 m butterfly	Daynara de Paula (BRA)	59.11	Daiene Dias (BRA)	59.33	Isabella Paez (CHI)	59.66
200 m butterfly	Andreina Pinto (VEN)	2:09.92	Virginia Bardach (ARG)	2:11.04	Joanna Maranhão (BRA)	2:11.65
200 m I.M.	Virginia Bardach (ARG)	2:13.46	Joanna Maranhão (BRA)	2:14.09	Florencia Perotti (ARG)	2:17.54
400 m I.M.	Virginia Bardach (ARG)	4:42.62	Joanna Maranhão (BRA)	4:43.31	Florencia Perotti (ARG)	4:50.27
4 × 100 m freestyle relay	Brazil; Graciele Herrmann; Daynara de Paula; Manuella Lyrio; Etiene Medeiros	3:43.91	Colombia; Jessica Camposano; Carolina Colorado Henao; María Álvarez; Isabella Arcila	3:50.37	Argentina; Cecilia Bertoncello; Maria Belen Diaz; Maria Sol Martin; Florencia Panzini	3:52.99
4 × 200 m freestyle relay	Brazil; Joanna Maranhão; Jessica Cavalheiro; Bruna Primati; Manuella Lyrio	8:04.29	Peru; Andrea Cedrón; Jessica Cattaneo; Azra Avdic; Daniela Coello	8:18.85	Colombia; Jessica Camposano; Isabella Arcila; Carolina Colorado Henao; María Álvarez	8:19.51
4 × 100 m medley relay	Argentina; Andrea Berrino; Macarena Ceballos; Virginia Bardach; Maria Belen Diaz	4:07.48	Brazil; Natalia de Luccas; Pamela Souza; Daynara de Paula; Manuella Lyrio	4:08.57	Venezuela; Jeserik Pinto; Mercedes Toledo; Isabella Paez; Andreina Pinto	4:11.94

Legend: CR – Championship record; NR – National record

=== Mixed events ===
Games	Gold		Silver		Bronze	
4 × 100 m freestyle relay	Brazil; Alan Vitória; Pedro Henrique Silva; Manuella Lyrio; Graciele Herrmann	3:30.98	Argentina; Guido Buscaglia; Lautaro Rodriguez; Maria Belen Diaz; Andrea Berrino	3:33.99	Colombia; Marco Guerrero; Juan Pablo Botero; Isabella Arcila; Jessica Camposano	3:35.42
4 × 100 m medley relay	Argentina; Andrea Berrino; Macarena Ceballos; Santiago Grassi; Federico Grabich	3:42.31	Paraguay; Maria Jose Arrua; Renato Prono; Benjamin Hockin; Karen Riveros	3:57.70	Venezuela; Carlos Omaña; Juan Sequera; Isabella Paez; Andrea Garrido	3:59.56

== Medal standings ==
Final medal standings for the 2016 South American Swimming Championships are:

* Host nation (Paraguay)

Rank	Nation	Gold	Silver	Bronze	Total
1	Brazil (BRA)	18	14	10	42
2	Argentina (ARG)	15	11	10	36
3	Venezuela (VEN)	7	8	10	25
4	Ecuador (ECU)	2	1	1	4
5	Colombia (COL)	0	4	7	11
6	Paraguay (PAR)*	0	2	2	4
7	Peru (PER)	0	1	1	2
8	Uruguay (URU)	0	1	0	1
9	Bolivia (BOL)	0	0	1	1
9	Chile (CHI)	0	0	1	1
Totals (10 entries)		42	42	43	127
