= List of Mexican records in swimming =

The Mexican Records in Swimming are the fastest times ever swum by a swimmer from Mexico. These records are kept/maintained by Mexico's national swimming federation: la Federación Mexicana de Natación (FMN). FMN recognizes records in both long course (50m) and short course (25m) pools, in the following events:

- freestyle (libre): 50, 100, 200, 400, 800 and 1500;
- backstroke (dorso): 50, 100 and 200;
- breaststroke (pecho): 50, 100 and 200;
- butterfly (mariposa): 50, 100 and 200;
- individual medley (I.M.) (combinado, C.I.): 200 and 400;
- relays (relevos): 200 free, 400 free, 800 free, and 400 medley.

== Long course (50 m) ==
=== Men ===
Event	Time		Name	Club	Date	Meet	Location	Ref
50 m freestyle	21.67	h	Gabriel Castaño	Texas Ford Aquatics	13 April 2024	TYR Pro Swim Series	San Antonio, United States	
100 m freestyle	48.14		Andres Dupont	Mexico	12 August 2025	Junior Pan American Games	Asunción, Paraguay	
200 m freestyle	1:46.32	h	Jorge Iga	Mexico	18 June 2024	CCCAN Championships	Monterrey, Mexico	
400 m freestyle	3:51.52		Ricardo Vargas	Mexico	23 July 2018	CAC Games	Barranquilla, Colombia	
800 m freestyle	7:56.78	not ratified	Ricardo Vargas	Mexico	8 August 2019	Pan American Games	Lima, Peru	
1500 m freestyle	15:03.87		Paulo Strehlke	Mexico	28 July 2026	CAC Games	Santo Domingo, Dominican Republic	
50 m backstroke	24.63	h	Marcus Reyes-Gentry	Mexico	30 July 2026	CAC Games	Santo Domingo, Dominican Republic	
100 m backstroke	53.68	r	Marcus Reyes-Gentry	Mexico	1 August 2026	CAC Games	Santo Domingo, Dominican Republic	
200 m backstroke	1:57.44		Humberto Nájera	Mexico	11 August 2025	Junior Pan American Games	Asunción, Paraguay	
50 m breaststroke	27.23	h	Andres Puente	Estado de México	23 April 2025	Selective International Events	Tijuana, Mexico	
100 m breaststroke	1:00.14		Miguel de Lara	Acuatica Nelson Vargas EMEX	5 April 2023	Mexican National Qualifier Meet	Monterrey, Mexico	
200 m breaststroke	2:09.60		Miguel de Lara	Acuatica Nelson Vargas EMEX	9 April 2023	Mexican National Qualifier Meet	Monterrey, Mexico	
50m butterfly	23.83	h	Andres Dupont	Mexico	1 August 2026	CAC Games	Santo Domingo, Dominican Republic	
100m butterfly	52.22	b	Long Gutiérrez	California	8 August 2015	US Championships	San Antonio, United States	
200m butterfly	1:56.89	not ratified	Héctor Ruvalcaba	Aggie Swim Club	25 June 2021	Fran Crippen Swim Meet of Champions	Mission Viejo, United States	
200m individual medley	1:59.78	not ratified	José Martínez	Aggie Swim Club	22 May 2021	Longhorn Elite Invite	Austin, United States	
400m individual medley	4:19.01	not ratified	Héctor Ruvalcaba	Mexico	30 April 2021	UANA Tokyo Qualifier	Clermont, United States	
4×50m freestyle relay	1:35.10		Christian Anguis; Manuel Sotomayor; Javier Díaz; Iván Serrano	Estado de México	April 2004	National Olympiad	Ciudad Obregón, Mexico	
4×50m freestyle relay	1:34.11	'#'	Jorge de la Portilla (23.91); Maximiliano Perez (23.57); Guillermo Cepeda (23.41); Andrés González (23.22)	Itesm Campus Monterrey	23 February 2024	1a Copa Querétaro Internacional	Queretaro, Mexico	
4×100m freestyle relay	3:17.70	not ratified	Gabriel Castaño (50.72); Daniel Ramírez (49.17); Jorge Iga (48.69); Long Gutiérrez (49.12)	Mexico	6 August 2019	Pan American Games	Lima, Peru	
4×200m freestyle relay	7:15.60		David Medina (1:49.86); Daniel Saborio (1:48.90); Andres Dupont (1:48.84); Jorge Iga (1:48.00)	Mexico	28 July 2026	CAC Games	Santo Domingo, Dominican Republic	
4×100m medley relay	3:35.81	h	Marcus Reyes-Gentry (54.04); Miguel de Lara (1:01.33); Jorge Iga (52.85); Andres Dupont (47.59)	Mexico	3 August 2025	World Championships	Singapore, Singapore	

Legend: # – Record awaiting ratification by FMN; WR – World record; AM – Americas record; e – equalled existing record;
Records not set in finals: h – heat; sf – semifinal; r – relay 1st leg; rh – relay heat 1st leg; b – B final; † – en route to final mark; so – swim-off; tt – time trial

=== Women ===
Event	Time		Name	Club	Date	Meet	Location	Ref
50 m freestyle	25.15		Liliana Ibáñez	Mexico	25 July 2018	CAC Games	Barranquilla, Colombia	
100 m freestyle	55.39		Liliana Ibáñez	Mexico	22 July 2018	CAC Games	Barranquilla, Colombia	
200 m freestyle	1:59.58	h	Ava Chavez	Mexico	12 August 2026	Pan Pacific Championships	Irvine, United States	
400 m freestyle	4:11.99	h	Susana Escobar	Mexico	10 August 2008	Olympic Games	Beijing, China	
800 m freestyle	8:33.51	h	Susana Escobar	Mexico	14 August 2008	Olympic Games	Beijing, China	
1500 m freestyle	16:26.36	h	Patricia Castañeda	Mexico	25 July 2011	World Championships	Shanghai, China	
50m backstroke	27.88	=	Celia Pulido	Mexico	5 March 2026	TYR Pro Swim Series	Westmont, United States	
50m backstroke	27.88	=	Celia Pulido	Code Guanajuato	9 April 2026	Selective International Events	Boca del Río, Mexico	
100m backstroke	1:00.02		Miranda Grana	Indiana University	22 April 2025	Selective International Events	Tijuana, Mexico	
200m backstroke	2:08.99	h	Daniela Linares	Mexico	14 August 2026	Pan Pacific Championships	Irvine, United States	
50m breaststroke	31.20		Melissa Rodríguez	Mexico	22 July 2018	CAC Games	Barranquilla, Colombia	
100m breaststroke	1:07.32	not ratified	Melissa Rodríguez	Mexico	13 June 2019	TYR Pro Swim Series	Clovis, United States	
200m breaststroke	2:25.54	not ratified	Melissa Rodríguez	Mexico	14 June 2019	TYR Pro Swim Series	Clovis, United States	
50m butterfly	26.40	h	Celia Pulido	Mexico	1 August 2025	World Championships	Singapore, Singapore	
100m butterfly	58.89		Miranda Grana	Mexico	30 July 2026	CAC Games	Santo Domingo, Dominican Republic	
200m butterfly	2:09.31		María Mata	Mexico	26 June 2023	CAC Games	San Salvador, El Salvador	
200m individual medley	2:13.97		Monika Gonzalez-Hermosillo	Mexico	1 May 2021	UANA Tokyo Qualifier	Clermont, United States	
400m individual medley	4:47.18	h	Susana Escobar	Mexico	4 August 2013	World Championships	Barcelona, Spain	
4×50m freestyle relay	1:49.79		Yazmin Tamayo; Estela Davis; Francia Rosales; Leslie Bueno	CHUH	2014	-	Veracruz, Mexico	
4×100m freestyle relay	3:44.90		Athena Meneses (56.46); Sofía Revilak (55.90); Andrea Sansores (56.45); María Mata (56.09)	Mexico	21 October 2023	Pan American Games	Santiago, Chile	
4×200m freestyle relay	8:11.56	h	Liliana Ibáñez (2:01.45); Fernanda González (2:04.42); Rita Medrano (2:04.26); Susana Escobar (2:01.43)	Mexico	1 August 2013	World Championships	Barcelona, Spain	
4×100m medley relay	4:08.26		Fernanda González (1:01.37); Melissa Rodríguez (1:09.09); Ana Sofia Revilak (1:01.13); Liliana Ibáñez (56.67)	Mexico	18 July 2015	Pan American Games	Toronto, Canada	
4×100m medley relay	4:04.73		Miranda Grana (1:01.86); Melissa Rodríguez (1:07.44); María Mata (59.40); Sofia Revilak (56.03)	Mexico	25 October 2023	Pan American Games	Santiago, Chile	

Legend: # – Record awaiting ratification by FMN; WR – World record; AM – Americas record; e – equalled existing record;
Records not set in finals: h – heat; sf – semifinal; r – relay 1st leg; rh – relay heat 1st leg; b – B final; † – en route to final mark; so – swim-off; tt – time trial

=== Mixed relay ===
Event	Time		Name	Club	Date	Meet	Location	Ref
4×50 m freestyle relay	1:39.76		Santiago Blanco (23.34); Diego Montoya (22.90); Susana Hernandez (26.44); Dany Haro (27.08)	Mexico	9 July 2022	CCCAN	Bridgetown, Barbados	
4×100 m freestyle relay	3:28.87		Andres Dupont (48.86); Jorge Iga (48.61); Tayde Revilak (55.72); Athena Meneses (55.68)	Mexico	22 October 2023	Pan American Games	Santiago, Chile	
4×100 m medley relay	3:49.34	h	Celia Pulido (1:00.97); Miguel de Lara (1:00.94); Miranda Grana (59.33); Andres Dupont (48.10)	Mexico	30 July 2025	World Championships	Singapore, Singapore	

Legend: # – Record awaiting ratification by FMN; WR – World record; AM – Americas record; e – equalled existing record;
Records not set in finals: h – heat; so – swim-off

== Short course (25 m) ==
=== Men ===
Event	Time		Name	Club	Date	Meet	Location	Ref
50 m freestyle	21.88	h	Daniel Ramírez	Mexico	8 December 2016	World Championships	Windsor, Canada	
100 m freestyle	47.47	†	Andres Dupont	Alberca Olimpica Cancun	16 December 2024	Mexican Championships	Queretaro, Mexico	
200 m freestyle	1:45.65		Jorge Iga	Acuática Nelson Vargas	16 December 2025	Mexican Championships	San Nicolás de los Garza, Mexico	
400 m freestyle	3:46.00		Ricardo Vargas	Morelos	20 December 2016	Mexican Championships	Monterrey, Mexico	
800 m freestyle	7:45.04		Ricardo Vargas	Morelos	19 December 2016	Mexican Championships	Monterrey, Mexico	
1500 m freestyle	14:45.52		Ricardo Vargas	Morelos	16 December 2016	Mexican Championships	Monterrey, Mexico	
50 m backstroke	23.97	h	Daniel Ramírez	Mexico	5 December 2014	World Championships	Doha, Qatar	
100 m backstroke	52.19		José Martínez	AC Nelson Vargas	17 December 2023	Mexican Championships	San Nicolás de los Garza, Mexico	
200 m backstroke	1:55.26		Miguel Robles	Nuevo León	19 December 2009	Mexican Championships	Boca del Río, Mexico	
50m breaststroke	26.63	h	Andres Puente	Mexico	11 October 2025	World Cup	Carmel, United States	
100m breaststroke	57.81		Andres Puente	Acuática Nelson Vargas	16 December 2025	Mexican Championships	San Nicolás de los Garza, Mexico	
200m breaststroke	2:05.52		Andres Puente	Acuática Nelson Vargas	14 December 2025	Mexican Championships	San Nicolás de los Garza, Mexico	
50m butterfly	22.69		José Martínez	Cali Condors	4 December 2021	International Swimming League	Eindhoven, Netherlands	
100m butterfly	50.46		José Martínez	Cali Condors	20 November 2021	International Swimming League	Eindhoven, Netherlands	
200m butterfly	1:51.39		José Martínez	Cali Condors	4 December 2021	International Swimming League	Eindhoven, Netherlands	
100m individual medley	52.88		José Martínez	Cali Condors	28 November 2021	International Swimming League	Eindhoven, Netherlands	
200m individual medley	1:54.64		José Martínez	Cali Condors	3 December 2021	International Swimming League	Eindhoven, Netherlands	
400m individual medley	4:07.50		Héctor Ruvalcaba Cruz	Mexico	30 October 2022	World Cup	Toronto, Canada	
4×50m freestyle relay	1:28.92		Long Yuan Miguel Gutierrez Feng (22.79); Guillermo Ruben Cruz Zuniga (21.86); Daniel Torres Samaniego (22.34); Jorge Andres Iga Cesar (21.93)	Estado de México	18 December 2017	Mexican Championships	Guadalajara, Mexico	
4×100m freestyle relay	3:18.26		Rolando Alonso Hernandez Arellano (50.48); Daniel Torres Samaniego (49.86); Jorge Andres Iga Cesar (49.22); Guillermo Ruben Cruz Zuniga (48.70)	Estado de México	19 December 2017	Mexican Championships	Guadalajara, Mexico	
4×200m freestyle relay	7:20.57			Nuevo Leon	17 December 2012	Mexican Championships	Mexico	
4×100m medley relay	3:36.64		Héctor Ruvalcaba (55.45); Andres Puente (58.23); Jorge Iga (52.71); Josue Hernandez (50.25)	Acuática Nelson Vargas	15 December 2025	Mexican Championships	San Nicolás de los Garza, Mexico	

Legend: # – Record awaiting ratification by FMN; WR – World record; AM – Americas record; e – equalled existing record;
Records not set in finals: h – heat; sf – semifinal; r – relay 1st leg; rh – relay heat 1st leg; b – B final; † – en route to final mark; so – swim-off; tt – time trial

=== Women ===
Event	Time		Name	Club	Date	Meet	Location	Ref
50 m freestyle	24.56		Liliana Ibáñez	Mexico	15 November 2018	World Cup	Singapore, Singapore	
100 m freestyle	53.19		Liliana Ibáñez	Mexico	17 November 2018	World Cup	Singapore, Singapore	
200 m freestyle	1:56.68		Liliana Ibáñez	Guanajuato	20 December 2013	Mexican Championships	Boca del Río, Mexico	
400 m freestyle	4:08.05		Patricia Castañeda	Jalisco	17 December 2009	Mexican Championships	Boca del Río, Mexico	
800 m freestyle	8:28.59		Susana Escobar	Etobicoke	28 November 2010	Canada Cup	Toronto, Canada	
1500 m freestyle	16:22.45		Patricia Castañeda	Jalisco	19 December 2009	Mexican Championships	Boca del Río, Mexico	
50 m backstroke	25.83		Celia Pulido	Mexico	10 October 2025	World Cup	Carmel, United States	
100 m backstroke	55.99		Celia Pulido	Code Guanajuato	15 December 2025	Mexican Championships	San Nicolás de los Garza, Mexico	
200 m backstroke	2:01.96		Miranda Grana	Mexico	19 October 2025	World Cup	Westmont, United States	
50 m breaststroke	31.49		Melissa Rodríguez	Academia Reveles	15 December 2025	Mexican Championships	San Nicolás de los Garza, Mexico	
100 m breaststroke	1:07.72	=	Melissa Rodríguez	Academia Reveles	17 December 2024	Mexican Championships	Queretaro, Mexico	
100 m breaststroke	1:07.72	=	Melissa Rodríguez	Academia Reveles	16 December 2025	Mexican Championships	San Nicolás de los Garza, Mexico	
200 m breaststroke	2:25.10		Melissa Rodríguez	Academia Reveles	14 December 2025	Mexican Championships	San Nicolás de los Garza, Mexico	
50 m butterfly	26.01	h	Celia Pulido	Code Guanajuato	14 December 2025	Mexican Championships	San Nicolás de los Garza, Mexico	
100 m butterfly	58.86		Rita Medrano	Aguascalientes	20 December 2010	Mexican Championships	Boca del Río, Mexico	
200 m butterfly	2:06.41		Maria Jose Mata Cocco	Libanes	17 October 2021	Jarocha Cup	Veracruz, Mexico	
100m individual medley	1:00.51	h	Miranda Grana	Mexico	17 October 2025	World Cup	Westmont, United States	
200m individual medley	2:11.69		Monika González-Hermosillo	Estado de México	15 December 2016	Mexican Championships	Monterrey, Mexico	
400m individual medley	4:40.05		Monika González-Hermosillo	Estado de México	18 December 2016	Mexican Championships	Monterrey, Mexico	
4×50m freestyle relay	1:45.10		Fernanda Gonzalez Ramiez (28.45); Ana Sofia Revilak Fonseca (25.87); Natasha Gvakharia (26.72); Monika González-Hermosillo (26.16)	Estado de México	14 December 2017	Mexican Championships	Guadalajara, Mexico	
4×100m freestyle relay	3:48.46		Alejandra de la Pena (57.39); Habibi Abrin Vargas (57.58); Fernanda Guerra (56.38); Laura Arroyo Cuara (57.11)	Nuevo Leon	15 December 2021	Mexican Championships	Zapopan, Mexico	
4×200m freestyle relay	8:18.27		María Fernanda Richaud (2:02.46); Andrea Salas (2:05.04); Melissa Villaseñor (2:04.84); Lourdes Villaseñor (2:05.93)	Nuevo Leon	17 December 2013	Mexican Championships	Boca del Río, Mexico	
4×100m medley relay	4:08.83		Dalahi Coronado (1:03.46); Mariana Gil (1:09.77); Fernanda Guerra (59.53); Alejandra de la Pena (56.07)	Nuevo Leon	18 December 2021	Mexican Championships	Zapopan, Mexico	

Legend: # – Record awaiting ratification by FMN; e – equalled existing record;
Records not set in finals: h – heat; sf – semifinal; r – relay 1st leg; rh – relay heat 1st leg; b – B final; † – en route to final mark; so – swim-off; tt – time trial

=== Mixed relay ===
Event	Time	Name	Club	Date	Meet	Location	Ref
4×50 m freestyle relay	1:38.12	Daniel Torres Samaniego (23.47); Ana Sofia Revilak Fonseca (26.10); Fernanda Gonzalez Ramirez (25.75); Long Yuan Miguel Gutierrez Feng (22.80)	Estado de México	17 December 2017	Mexican Championships	Guadalajara, Mexico	
4×100 m freestyle relay	3:31.35	Andres Gonzalez Cantu (49.04); Daniel Saborio Grillo (49.76); Ana Camila de la Fuente (56.40); Habibi Montserrat Abrin Vargas (56.15)	Itesm Campus Monterrey	16 December 2025	Mexican Championships	San Nicolas de los Garza, Mexico	
4×50 m medley relay	1:47.41	Fernanda Gonzalez Ramirez (28.99); Miguel Alejandro De Lara Ojeda (27.66); Jorge Andres Iga Cesar (24.43); Natasha Gvakharia Mgebrishvili (26.33)	Estado de México	18 December 2017	Mexican Championships	Guadalajara, Mexico	
4×100 m medley relay	3:58.28	Fernanda Gonzalez Ramirez; M. de Lara; Ana Sofia Revilak Fonseca; A. Iga	Estado de México	14 December 2018	Mexican Championships	Mexico	

Legend: # – Record awaiting ratification by FMN; e – equalled existing record;
Records not set in finals: h – heat; so – swim-off
