= Marcelo Acosta =

Salvadoran swimmer (born 1996)

Personal information
- Full name: Marcelo Alberto Acosta Jiménez
- Born: 11 July 1996 (age 29) El Salvador

Sport
- Sport: Swimming
- Strokes: Freestyle
- College team: University of Louisville
- Coach: Arthur Albieri (Louisville)
Medal record
Youth Olympic Games
Silver medal – second place	2014 Nanjing	400 m freestyle
Central American and Caribbean Games
Gold medal – first place	2014 Veracruz	1500 m freestyle
Gold medal – first place	2018 Barranquilla	400 m freestyle
Silver medal – second place	2014 Veracruz	400 m freestyle
Silver medal – second place	2018 Barranquilla	1500 m freestyle

Marcelo Alberto Acosta Jiménez (born 11 July 1996) is a retired Salvadoran swimmer.

== Career ==
At the 2014 Central American and Caribbean Games, Acosta set the Games record in the 1500m freestyle at 15:22.43. At the 2015 Pan American Games, he carried the Salvadoran flag into the stadium.

As of August 2016, Acosta holds the Salvadoran records in the 100 meters, 200 meters, 400 meters, 800 meters and 1500 meters.

In 2016, Acosta became the first swimmer from El Salvador to qualify for the Olympic Games with an "A" cut. At the third stop of the Arena Pro Series in Orlando, Acosta won the 1500m race with a time of 15:13.09.

At the 2016 Olympic Games in Rio de Janeiro, Acosta finished 22nd in the 1500m freestyle with a new national record time of 15:08.17.

At the 2017 World Aquatics Championships, Acosta finished in 14th place in both the 800 m freestyle at 7:55.70 and the 1500m freestyle at 15:04:79.

Acosta competed for the University of Louisville.

Acosta competed at the 2020 Summer Olympics.

On 20 June 2022, Marcelo announced his retirement from professional swimming,
