= Swimming at the 2014 Central American and Caribbean Games =

- Venue: Leyes de Reforma Aquatic Center
- Location: Veracruz, Mexico
- Dates: 15–22 November

The swimming competition at the 2014 Central American and Caribbean Games was held in Veracruz, Mexico.

The tournament was scheduled to be held from 15 to 20 November at the Leyes de Reforma Aquatic Center. Open water swimming was scheduled to be held from 21 to 22 November at Regatas Beach.

== Medal summary ==
=== Men's events ===
Games	Gold		Silver		Bronze	
50m freestyle	George Bovell (TRI)	22.30	Renzo Tjon-A-Joe (SUR)	22.62	Hanser García (CUB)	22.69
100m freestyle	Hanser García (CUB)	49.00 GR	Cristian Quintero (VEN)	49.66	Albert Subirats (VEN)	50.52
200m freestyle	Cristian Quintero (VEN)	1:49.08 GR	Daniele Tirabassi (VEN)	1:50.93	Long Gutierrez (MEX)	1:51.28
400m freestyle	Mateo de Angulo (COL)	3:53.20 GR	Marcelo Acosta (ESA)	3:53.39	Cristian Quintero (VEN)	3:55.22
1500m freestyle	Marcelo Acosta (ESA)	15:22.43 GR	Mateo de Angulo (COL)	15:26.71	Alejandro Gómez (VEN)	15:37.85
50m backstroke	Albert Subirats (VEN)	25.72 GR	Robinson Molina (VEN)	25.90	George Bovell (TRI)	25.91
100m backstroke	Omar Pinzón (COL)	55.48 GR	Albert Subirats (VEN)	55.68	Armando Barrera (CUB)	56.54
200m backstroke	Omar Pinzón (COL)	2:00.95	David Cespedes (COL)	2:03.85	Yeziel Morales (PUR)	2:03.86
50m breaststroke	Jorge Murillo (COL)	28.12	Édgar Crespo (PAN)	28.35	Miguel de Lara (MEX)	28.46
100m breaststroke	Carlos Claverie (VEN)	1:01.76 GR	Jorge Murillo (COL)	1:01.90	Édgar Crespo (PAN)	1:02.45
200m breaststroke	Carlos Claverie (VEN)	2:12.44 GR	Miguel de Lara (MEX)	2:14.78	Jorge Murillo (COL)	2:14.90
50m butterfly	Albert Subirats (VEN)	24.01	Luis Carlos Martínez (GUA)	24.31	Renzo Tjon-A-Joe (SUR)	24.56
100m butterfly	Albert Subirats (VEN)	53.48	Luis Carlos Martínez (GUA)	54.00	Andres Montoya (COL)	54.57
200m butterfly	Andres Montoya (COL)	1:59.35	Marcos Lavado (VEN)	2:00.44	Jose Angel Martinez (MEX)	2:01.26
200m IM	Omar Pinzón (COL)	2:02.07 GR	Rafael Alfaro (ESA)	2:03.99	Ezequiel Trujillo (MEX)	2:04.20
400m IM	Carlos Claverie (VEN)	4:24.61	Christian Bayo (PUR)	4:27.32	Juan Sequera (VEN)	4:28.45
4 × 100 m freestyle relay	Venezuela (VEN); Cristian Quintero; Crox Acuna; Jesús López; Albert Subirats	3:23.63	Mexico (MEX); Luis Enrique Campos; Daniel Ramirez; Long Gutierrez; Alejandro Escudero	3:25.06	Colombia (COL); Juan Pablo Botero; Alberto Morales; Omar Pinzón; Mateo de Angulo	3:25.50
4 × 100 m medley relay	Venezuela (VEN); Albert Subirats; Carlos Claverie; Eddy Marin; Cristian Quintero	3:41.94 GR	Colombia (COL); Omar Pinzón; Jorge Murillo; Andres Montoya; Alberto Morales	3:43.15	Mexico (MEX); Gustavo Berreta; Miguel de Lara; Daniel Ramirez; Alejandro Escudero	3:45.08
10 km open water	Diego Vera (VEN)	1:55:43.3	Daniel Delgadillo (MEX)	1:55:43.6	Arturo Perez (MEX)	1:55:43.7

=== Women's events ===
Games	Gold		Silver		Bronze	
50m freestyle	Arianna Vanderpool-Wallace (BAH)	25.24	Vanessa García (PUR)	25.63	Liliana Ibáñez (MEX)	26.04
100m freestyle	Arianna Vanderpool-Wallace (BAH)	54.87 GR	Liliana Ibáñez (MEX)	56.18	Vanessa García (PUR)	56.70
200m freestyle	Andreina Pinto (VEN)	2:00.42	Jessica Camposano (COL)	2:00.68 NR	Elisbet Gamez (CUB)	2:02.08
400m freestyle	Andreina Pinto (VEN)	4:11.65	Joanna Evans (BAH)	4:16.82	Natalia Jaspeado (MEX)	4:17.43
800m freestyle	Andreina Pinto (VEN)	8:39.49 GR	Joanna Evans (BAH)	8:39.61	Natalia Jaspeado (MEX)	8:41.38
50m backstroke	Maria Fernanda Gonzalez (MEX)	29.03 GR	Gisela Morales (GUA)	29.67	Isabella Arcila (COL)	29.71
100m backstroke	Maria Fernanda Gonzalez (MEX)	1:01.57 GR	Carolina Colorado Henao (COL)	1:03.00	Gisela Morales (GUA)	1:03.81
200m backstroke	Maria Fernanda Gonzalez (MEX)	2:13.47	Carolina Colorado Henao (COL)	2:18.36	Gisela Morales (GUA)	2:19.14
50m breaststroke	Melissa Rodríguez (MEX)	32.52	Mercedes Toledo (VEN)	32.69	Patricia Casellas (PUR)	32.96
100m breaststroke	Mercedes Toledo (VEN)	1:10.83	Melissa Rodríguez (MEX)	1:10.97	Karina Vivas (VEN)	1:12.72
200m breaststroke	Melissa Rodríguez (MEX)	2:29.37 GR	Esther Gonzalez (MEX)	2:32.62	Mercedes Toledo (VEN)	2:32.95
50m butterfly	Arianna Vanderpool-Wallace (BAH)	26.46 GR	Carolina Colorado Henao (COL)	27.40	Jeserik Pinto (VEN)	27.54
100m butterfly	Arianna Vanderpool-Wallace (BAH)	1:00.17	Jessica Camposano (COL)	1:00.64	Carolina Colorado Henao (COL)	1:00.97
200m butterfly	Andreina Pinto (VEN)	2:11.34	Maria Jose Mata (MEX)	2:13.48	Jessica Camposano (COL)	2:14.18
200m IM	Andreina Pinto (VEN)	2:18.31	Maria Fernanda Gonzalez (MEX)	2:20.27	Barbara Caraballo (PUR)	2:20.88
400m IM	Andreina Pinto (VEN)	4:48.80 GR	Natalia Jaspeado (MEX)	4:53.81	Maria Gabriela Jimenez (MEX)	5:01.16
4 × 100 m freestyle relay	Mexico (MEX); Maria Richaud; Natalia Jaspeado; Maria Fernanda Gonzalez; Liliana Ibáñez	3:47.89 GR	Colombia (COL); Carolina Colorado Henao; Laura Galarza; Jessica Camposano; Isabella Arcila	3:48.89	Venezuela (VEN); Andreina Pinto; Jeserik Pinto; Erika Torrellas; Yennifer Marquez	3:51.16
4 × 100 m medley relay	Mexico (MEX); Maria Fernanda Gonzalez; Byanca Rodriguez; Diana Luna; Liliana Ibáñez	4:10.04	Colombia (COL); Carolina Colorado Henao; Salome Cataño; Jessica Camposano; Isabella Arcila	4:12.76	Venezuela (VEN); Jeserik Pinto; Mercedes Toledo; Erika Torrellas; Yennifer Marquez	4:14.21
10 km open water	Montserrat Ortuno (MEX)	1:59:18.9	Paola Perez (VEN)	1:59:30.2	Zaira Cardenas (MEX)	2:02:33.0

== Medal table ==
* Host nation (Mexico)

Rank	Nation	Gold	Silver	Bronze	Total
1	Venezuela (VEN)	17	7	9	33
2	Mexico (MEX)*	8	9	11	28
3	Colombia (COL)	6	11	6	23
4	Bahamas (BAH)	4	2	0	6
5	El Salvador (ESA)	1	2	0	3
6	Cuba (CUB)	1	0	3	4
7	Trinidad and Tobago (TRI)	1	0	1	2
8	Guatemala (GUA)	0	3	2	5
9	Puerto Rico (PUR)	0	2	3	5
10	Panama (PAN)	0	1	1	2
10	Suriname (SUR)	0	1	1	2
Totals (11 entries)		38	38	37	113
