= Swimming at the 2010 South American Games – Women's 50 metre butterfly =

The Women's 50m butterfly event at the 2010 South American Games was held on March 27, with the heats at 10:00 and the Final at 18:00.

== Medalists ==
Gold	Silver	Bronze
Daynara de Paula; Brazil	Daniele Jesus; Brazil	Jeserik Pinto; Venezuela

== Records ==
Standing records prior to the 2010 South American Games
World record	Therese Alshammar (SWE)	25.07	Rome, Italy	31 July 2009
Competition Record	Gabriella Silva (BRA)	27.95	Buenos Aires, Argentina	16 November 2006
South American record	Daynara de Paula (BRA)	25.85	Rome, Italy	31 July 2009

== Results ==
=== Heats ===
Rank	Heat	Lane	Athlete	Result	Notes
1	3	4	Daynara de Paula (BRA)	27.21	Q CR
2	2	4	Daniele Jesus (BRA)	27.91	Q
3	3	6	Jeserik Pinto (VEN)	28.17	Q
4	2	5	María Clara Sosa (COL)	28.62	Q
5	1	4	Loren Yamile Cabello (ECU)	28.77	Q
6	1	5	Manuela Morano (ARG)	28.88	Q
7	1	3	Ayelen Becker (ARG)	28.98	Q
7	2	3	Elimar Barrios (VEN)	28.98	Q
9	1	6	Ximena Espinol (ECU)	29.85	
10	2	6	Raissa Andrea Guerra (URU)	29.94	
11	2	2	Maria Wong Rosales (PER)	30.18	
12	1	2	Nilshaira Isenia (AHO)	30.19	
13	3	2	Karen Torrez Guzman (BOL)	30.28	
14	3	7	Massie Carrillo Yong (PER)	31.16	
15	2	7	Josefina Meneses (CHI)	31.48	
	3	3	Eliana Barrios (VEN)	DNS	
	3	5	Carolina Colorado Henao (COL)	DSQ	

=== Final ===
Rank	Lane	Athlete	Result	Notes
1st place, gold medalist(s)	4	Daynara de Paula (BRA)	26.77	CR
2nd place, silver medalist(s)	5	Daniele Jesus (BRA)	27.35	
3rd place, bronze medalist(s)	3	Jeserik Pinto (VEN)	27.58	
4	6	Loren Yamile Cabello (ECU)	28.05	
5	6	María Clara Sosa (COL)	28.46	
6	1	Ayelen Becker (ARG)	28.73	
7	7	Manuela Morano (ARG)	28.92	
8	8	Elimar Barrios (VEN)	28.99	
