= Esther González (swimmer) =

Mexican swimmer (born 1995)

Personal information
- Born: 26 June 1995 (age 31)

Sport
- Sport: Swimming
Medal record
Representing Mexico
Central American and Caribbean Games
Silver medal – second place	2014 Veracruz	200m breaststroke
Silver medal – second place	2018 Barranquilla	200m breaststroke
Bronze medal – third place	2018 Barranquilla	100m breaststroke

Esther González (born 26 June 1995) is a Mexican swimmer. She competed in the women's 200 metre breaststroke event at the 2017 World Aquatics Championships.
