= Monika González-Hermosillo =

Mexican swimmer (born 1995)

Personal information
- Full name: Monika González-Hermosillo
- Nationality: Mexico
- Born: October 27, 1995 (age 30) Mexico City, Mexico

Sport
- Sport: Swimming
- Strokes: Breaststroke, Freestyle, Individual Medley
- Club: Texas A&M University
- Coach: Steve Bultman
Medal record
Pan American Games
Bronze medal – third place	2019 Lima	Mixed 4×100 m freestyle
Central American and Caribbean Games
Gold medal – first place	2018 Barranquilla	200 m individual medley
Gold medal – first place	2018 Barranquilla	4×100 m freestyle
Gold medal – first place	2018 Barranquilla	4×200 m freestyle
Bronze medal – third place	2018 Barranquilla	400 m individual medley

Monika González-Hermosillo (born October 27, 1995) is a German-Mexican-American competitive swimmer. She won 3 gold medals at the 2018 Central American and Caribbean Games, and a bronze medal at the 2019 Pan American Games.

== Career ==
Gonzalez swam for Texas A&M under Steve Bultman.
