= Armando Barrera =

Cuban swimmer (born 1995)

Armando Barrera Aira
Personal information
- National team: Cuba
- Born: 18 November 1995 (age 30)

Sport
- Sport: Swimming
Medal record
Representing Cuba
Central American and Caribbean Games
Silver medal – second place	2018 Barranquilla	100m backstroke
Silver medal – second place	2018 Barranquilla	200m backstroke
Bronze medal – third place	2014 Veracruz	100m backstroke

Armando Barrera Aira (born 18 November 1995) is a Cuban swimmer. In 2019, he represented Cuba at the 2019 World Aquatics Championships in Gwangju, South Korea.

In 2018, he won the silver medal in both the men's 100 metre backstroke and men's 200 metre backstroke events at the 2018 Central American and Caribbean Games held in Barranquilla, Colombia.
