= Swimming at the 2006 Central American and Caribbean Games – Women's 200 metre butterfly =

The women's 200m Butterfly event at the 2006 Central American and Caribbean Games occurred on Thursday, July 20, 2006, at the S.U. Pedro de Heredia Aquatic Complex in Cartagena, Colombia.

Records at the time of the event were:

- World Record: 2:05.61, Otylia Jędrzejczak (Poland), Montreal, Canada, July 28, 2005.
- Games Record: 2:17.00, Meliza Mata (Costa Rica), 1998 Games in Maracaibo (Aug.14.1998).

== Results ==
=== Final ===
Place	Swimmer	Country	Time	Note
1	Alma Paulina Arciniega Castro	Mexico	2:15.82	GR
2	Prisciliana Eugenia Escobar Torres	Mexico	2:17.86	
3	Andreina Pinto	Venezuela	2:17.89	
4	Maria Alejandra Rodriguez	Venezuela	2:18.37	
5	Anay Gutierrez Solenza	Cuba	2:20.05	
6	Vanessa de Lourdes Martinez Colomer	Puerto Rico	2:24.38	
7	Ana Guadalupe Hernandez Duarte	El Salvador	2:27.42	
8	Johanna Rodriguez Chavarria	Costa Rica	2:32.96	

=== Preliminaries ===
Rank	Swimmer	Country	Time	Note
1	Prisciliana Eugenia Escobar Torres	Mexico	2:17.39	Q
2	Alma Paulina Arciniega Castro	Mexico	2:19.33	Q
3	Anay Gutierrez Solenza	Cuba	2:23.37	Q
4	Andreina Pinto	Venezuela	2:23.39	Q
5	Vanessa de Lourdes Martinez Colomer	Puerto Rico	2:23.40	Q
6	Maria Alejandra Rodriguez	Venezuela	2:23.85	Q
7	Ana Guadalupe Hernandez Duarte	El Salvador	2:27.32	Q
8	Heather Roffey	Cayman Islands	2:27.78	Q
9	Johanna Rodriguez Chavarria	Costa Rica	2:29.80	
10	Marsha Nicole Watson	Barbados	2:30.15	
11	Marcela Martinez	Colombia	2:30.79	
12	Juanita Hurtado	Colombia	2:35.66	
13	Michael-Anne Myrvang	Virgin Islands	2:39.81	
14	Jodie Foster	Cayman Islands	2:49.38	
--	Priscilla Jannasch	Suriname	DNS	
