= Mateo de Angulo =

Colombian swimmer (born 1990)

Mateo De Angulo
Personal information
- Full name: Mateo De Angulo Velasco
- Nickname: TEO
- Nationality: Colombia
- Born: 18 June 1990 (age 36) Cali, Colombia
- Height: 1.80 m (5 ft 11 in)
- Weight: 75 kg (165 lb)

Sport
- Sport: Swimming
- Strokes: Freestyle
- College team: Florida State Seminoles (USA)
- Coach: Frank Bradley
Medal record
Men's swimming
Representing Colombia
South American Games
Silver medal – second place	2014 Santiago	4x200 m freestyle
Bronze medal – third place	2010 Medellín	4x200 m freestyle
Central American and Caribbean Games
Gold medal – first place	2010 Mayagüez	4×200 m freestyle
Gold medal – first place	2014 Veracruz	400 m freestyle
Silver medal – second place	2014 Veracruz	1500 m freestyle
Bronze medal – third place	2010 Mayagüez	4×100 m medley
Bronze medal – third place	2014 Veracruz	4x100 m freestyle

Mateo De Angulo Velasco (born June 18, 1990, in Cali) is a Colombian swimmer, who specialized in long-distance freestyle events. He is a 2010 NJCAA Men's Swimmer of the Year, and nine-time NJCAA champion. He also holds Colombian records in all three long-distance freestyle events (400, 800, and 1500 m). De Angulo helped his Colombian team to take the trophy in the 800 m freestyle relay at the 2010 Central American and Caribbean Games in Mayagüez, Puerto Rico.

De Angulo qualified for the men's 400 m freestyle at the 2012 Summer Olympics in London, by establishing a Colombian record and a time faster than the FINA B-cut off time of 3:53.66 from the Indy Grand Prix in Indianapolis, Indiana. He challenged former world champion and USC Trojans swimmer Mateusz Sawrymowicz of Poland, Florida Southern Moccasins swimmer Allan Gutierrez Castro of Honduras, and Palestine's Ahmed Gebrel on the first heat. De Angulo cruised to second place by four seconds behind Sawrymowicz in 3:57.76. De Angulo failed to advance into the final, as he placed twenty-sixth overall on the first day of preliminaries.

De Angulo is a varsity swimmer for the Florida State Seminoles, and a graduate of social sciences at the Florida State University in Tallahassee, Florida.
