= Robinson Molina =

Venezuelan swimmer (born 1997)

Personal information
- Born: 5 May 1997 (age 29)

Sport
- Sport: Swimming
Medal record
Men's swimming
Representing Venezuela
Central American and Caribbean Games
Silver medal – second place	2014 Veracruz	50 m backstroke
Silver medal – second place	2018 Barranquilla	50 m backstroke
Silver medal – second place	2018 Barranquilla	4×100 m freestyle
Bronze medal – third place	2018 Barranquilla	100 m backstroke
Bronze medal – third place	2018 Barranquilla	4×100 m medley
Bronze medal – third place	2018 Barranquilla	4×100 m mixed medley
South American Championships
Gold medal – first place	2016 Asunción	4×100 m medley
Silver medal – second place	2016 Asunción	50 m backstroke

Robinson Molina (born 5 May 1997) is a Venezuelan swimmer. He competed in the men's 50 metre backstroke event at the 2017 World Aquatics Championships.

In 2014, he represented Venezuela at the 2014 Summer Youth Olympics held in Nanjing, China. In 2019, he competed in two events at the 2019 World Aquatics Championships held in Gwangju, South Korea.
