= Mercedes Toledo =

Venezuelan swimmer (born 1989)

Personal information
- Born: 17 May 1989 (age 37)

Sport
- Sport: Swimming
- Strokes: Breaststroke
Medal record
Representing Venezuela
Central American and Caribbean Games
Gold medal – first place	2014 Veracruz	100m breaststroke
Gold medal – first place	2023 Santa Tecla	50m breaststroke
Silver medal – second place	2014 Veracruz	50m breaststroke
Silver medal – second place	2018 Barranquilla	4x100m medley relay
Bronze medal – third place	2014 Veracruz	200m breaststroke
Bronze medal – third place	2014 Veracruz	4x100m medley relay
Bronze medal – third place	2018 Barranquilla	50m breaststroke
Bronze medal – third place	2023 Santa Tecla	100m breaststroke
Bronze medal – third place	2023 Santa Tecla	4x100m medley relay
South American Games
Silver medal – second place	2018 Cochabamba	100m breaststroke
Bronze medal – third place	2018 Cochabamba	200m breaststroke
Bronze medal – third place	2022 Asuncion	Mixed 100m freestyle relay

Mercedes Carolina Toledo Salazar (born 17 May 1989) is a Venezuelan swimmer. She competed in the women's 200 metre breaststroke event at the 2017 World Aquatics Championships.
