= Fernanda González =

Mexican swimmer (born 1990)

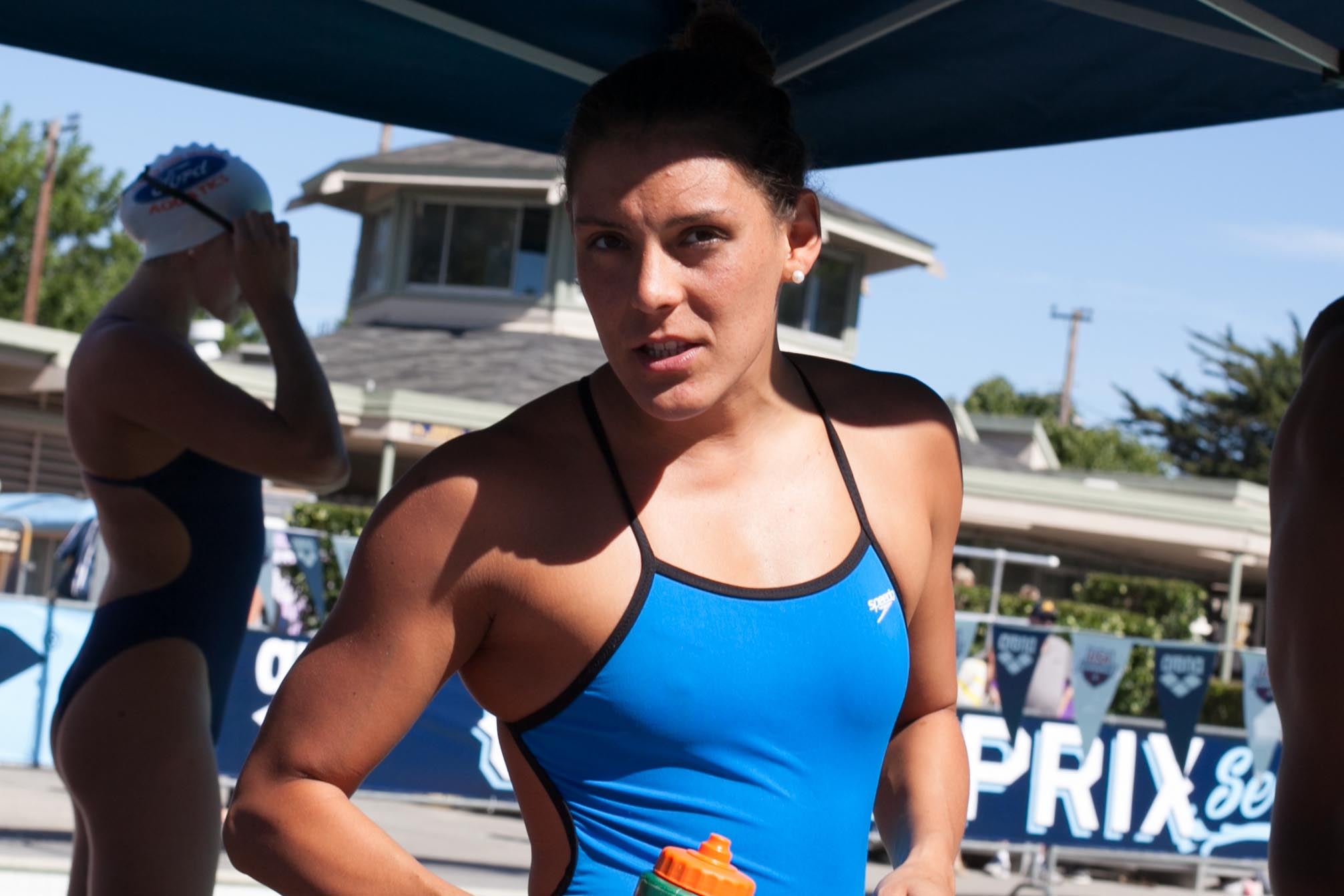

Personal information
- Full name: María Fernanda González Ramirez
- Nickname: La Garza. Mafer. La diva del barrio.
- Nationality: Mexico
- Born: April 25, 1990 (age 36) Mexico City, DF, Mexico
- Height: 174 cm (5 ft 9 in)
- Weight: 58 kg (128 lb)

Sport
- Sport: Swimming
- Strokes: Backstroke
- Club: Colorado Stars
Medal record
Pan American Games
Bronze medal – third place	2011 Guadalajara	100 m backstroke
Bronze medal – third place	2011 Guadalajara	200 m backstroke
Bronze medal – third place	2011 Guadalajara	4x200 freestyle
Central American and Caribbean Games
Gold medal – first place	2006 Cartagena	50 m backstroke
Gold medal – first place	2006 Cartagena	100 m backstroke
Gold medal – first place	2010 Mayagüez	4x100 m medley
Gold medal – first place	2014 Veracruz	50 m backstroke
Gold medal – first place	2014 Veracruz	100 m backstroke
Gold medal – first place	2014 Veracruz	200 m backstroke
Gold medal – first place	2014 Veracruz	4x100 m freestyle
Gold medal – first place	2014 Veracruz	4x100 m medley
Silver medal – second place	2006 Cartagena	4x100 m medley
Silver medal – second place	2010 Mayagüez	50 m backstroke
Silver medal – second place	2010 Mayagüez	100 m backstroke
Silver medal – second place	2010 Mayagüez	200 m backstroke
Silver medal – second place	2014 Veracruz	200 m medley
Bronze medal – third place	2010 Mayagüez	200 m medley
Bronze medal – third place	2010 Mayagüez	4x100 m freestyle

María Fernanda González Ramirez (born April 25, 1990) is an Olympic and National record-holding backstroke swimmer from Mexico. She swam for Mexico at the 2008 Summer Olympics.

In March 2012, González was the first of Mexico's swimming qualifiers for the 2012 Olympics. She swam in the 100 and 200 m backstroke.

== Career ==
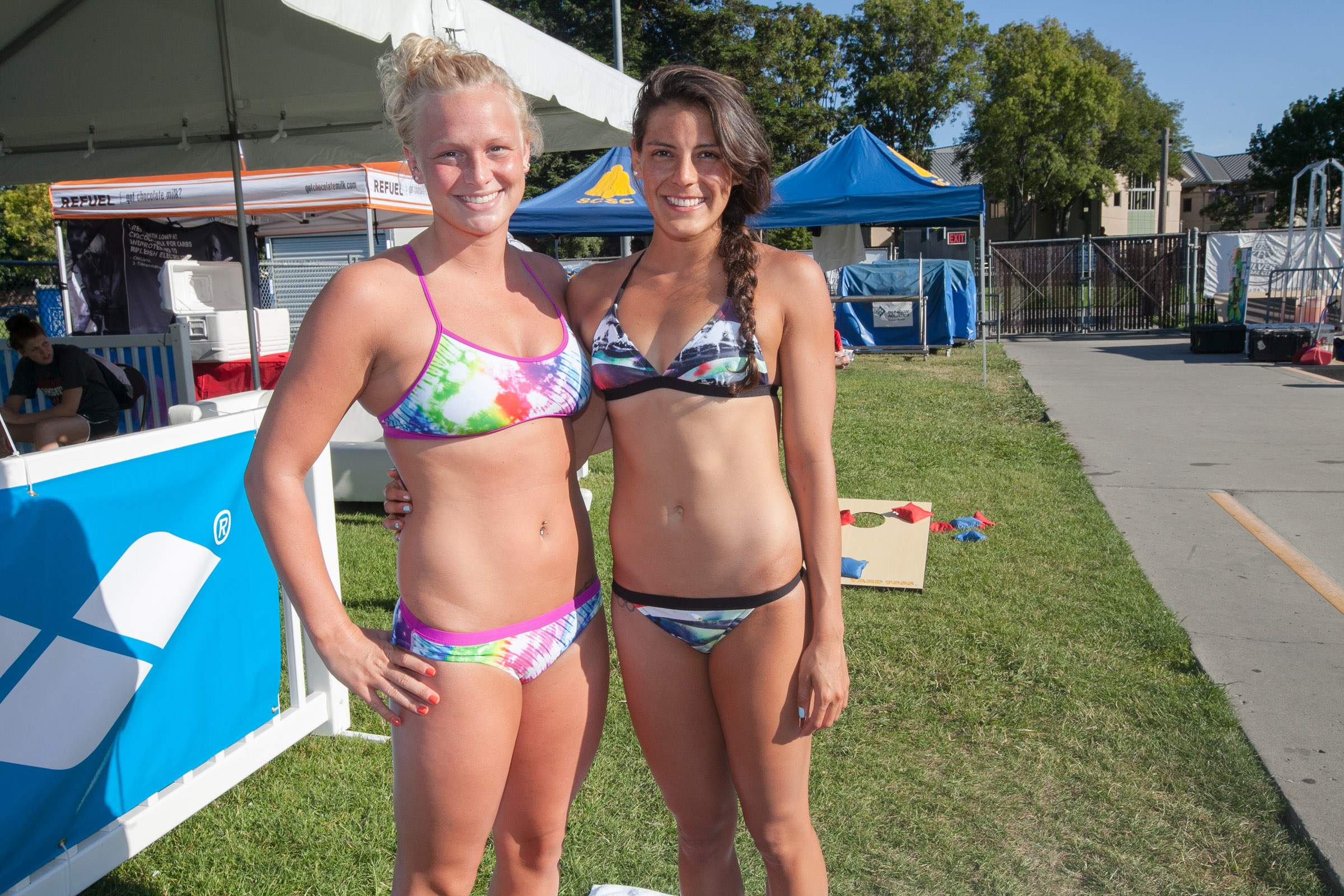
Fernanda González (right)

As of March 2008, González holds the Mexican Records in the long-course (50m) 50, 100 and 200 backstrokes, as well as in the short-course (25m) 100 and 200 backstrokes.

At the 2006 Central American and Caribbean Games, she set the Games Records by winning the 50 and 100 backstroke events (30.61 and 1:04.28). In the 100 back, González also bettered a 20-year-old record set by Costa Rica's Silvia Poll (1:04.43) at the 1986 Games.
