= Andrea Berrino =

Argentine swimmer (born 1994)

Personal information
- Born: 14 February 1994 (age 32)

Sport
- Sport: Swimming
Medal record
Women's swimming
Representing Argentina
| Event | 1st | 2nd | 3rd |
|---|---|---|---|
| Pan American Games | 0 | 0 | 1 |
| South American Championships | 12 | 12 | 3 |
| Total | 12 | 12 | 4 |
Pan American Games
| Bronze medal – third place | 2019 Lima | 4×100 m mixed medley |
South American Championships
| Gold medal – first place | 2014 Mar del Plata | 200 m backstroke |
| Gold medal – first place | 2016 Asunción | 50 m backstroke |
| Gold medal – first place | 2016 Asunción | 200 m backstroke |
| Gold medal – first place | 2016 Asunción | 4×100 m medley |
| Gold medal – first place | 2016 Asunción | 4×100 m mixed medley |
| Gold medal – first place | 2018 Trujillo | 50 m backstroke |
| Gold medal – first place | 2018 Trujillo | 100 m backstroke |
| Gold medal – first place | 2018 Trujillo | 200 m backstroke |
| Gold medal – first place | 2018 Trujillo | 4×200 m freestyle |
| Gold medal – first place | 2021 Buenos Aires | 200 m backstroke |
| Gold medal – first place | 2021 Buenos Aires | 4×100 m freestyle |
| Gold medal – first place | 2021 Buenos Aires | 4×100 m medley |
| Silver medal – second place | 2014 Mar del Plata | 50 m backstroke |
| Silver medal – second place | 2014 Mar del Plata | 4×100 m freestyle |
| Silver medal – second place | 2014 Mar del Plata | 4×200 m freestyle |
| Silver medal – second place | 2014 Mar del Plata | 4×100 m medley |
| Silver medal – second place | 2014 Mar del Plata | 4×100 m mixed medley |
| Silver medal – second place | 2016 Asunción | 100 m backstroke |
| Silver medal – second place | 2016 Asunción | 4×100 m mixed freestyle |
| Silver medal – second place | 2018 Trujillo | 4×100 m freestyle |
| Silver medal – second place | 2018 Trujillo | 4×100 m medley |
| Silver medal – second place | 2018 Trujillo | 4×100 m mixed freestyle |
| Silver medal – second place | 2018 Trujillo | 4×100 m mixed medley |
| Silver medal – second place | 2021 Buenos Aires | 50 m backstroke |
| Bronze medal – third place | 2014 Mar del Plata | 100 m backstroke |
| Bronze medal – third place | 2021 Buenos Aires | 50 m freestyle |
| Bronze medal – third place | 2021 Buenos Aires | 100 m freestyle |

Andrea Berrino (born 14 February 1994) is an Argentine swimmer. She competed in the women's 50 metre backstroke event at the 2017 World Aquatics Championships. She holds a bronze medal from the Pan American Games.
