= Elisbet Gámez =

Cuban swimmer (born 1997)

Personal information
- Born: 17 January 1997 (age 29) Baracoa, Cuba

Sport
- Sport: Swimming
Medal record
Representing Cuba
Central American and Caribbean Games
Gold medal – first place	2023 San Salvador	100 m freestyle
Gold medal – first place	2023 San Salvador	200 m freestyle
Gold medal – first place	2023 San Salvador	4×100 m freestyle
Gold medal – first place	2023 San Salvador	4×200 m freestyle
Silver medal – second place	2018 Barranquilla	200 m freestyle
Silver medal – second place	2023 San Salvador	400 m freestyle
Bronze medal – third place	2014 Veracruz	200 m freestyle
Bronze medal – third place	2018 Barranquilla	4x200 m freestyle

Elisbet Gámez Matos (born 17 January 1997) is a Cuban swimmer. She competed in the women's 200 metre freestyle event at the 2016 Summer Olympics.

In 2019, she represented Cuba at the 2019 World Aquatics Championships held in Gwangju, South Korea. She competed in the women's 200 metre freestyle and women's 400 metre freestyle events. In the 200 metre event she did not advance to compete in the semi-finals and in the 400 metre event she did not advance to compete in the final.

She competed at the 2020 Summer Olympics.
