= Isabella Arcila =

Colombian swimmer (born 1994)

Personal information
- Full name: Isabella Arcila Hurtado
- Nationality: Colombia
- Born: 11 March 1994 (age 32) Cali, Colombia

Sport
- Sport: Swimming
- Strokes: Freestyle; Backstroke; Individual medley
- College team: SMU (2011–2015)
Medal record
Representing Colombia
Women's swimming
| Event | 1st | 2nd | 3rd |
|---|---|---|---|
| CAC Games | 4 | 5 | 2 |
| South American Games | 3 | 4 | 0 |
| South American Championships | 4 | 4 | 3 |
| Bolivarian Games | 4 | 3 | 0 |
| Total | 15 | 16 | 5 |
Central American and Caribbean Games
| Gold medal – first place | 2018 Barranquilla | 50 m freestyle |
| Gold medal – first place | 2018 Barranquilla | 100 m freestyle |
| Gold medal – first place | 2018 Barranquilla | 50 m backstroke |
| Gold medal – first place | 2018 Barranquilla | 100 m backstroke |
| Silver medal – second place | 2014 Veracruz | 4×100 m freestyle |
| Silver medal – second place | 2014 Veracruz | 4×100 m medley |
| Silver medal – second place | 2018 Barranquilla | 4×100 m freestyle |
| Silver medal – second place | 2018 Barranquilla | 4×100 m mixed freestyle |
| Silver medal – second place | 2018 Barranquilla | 4×100 m mixed medley |
| Bronze medal – third place | 2014 Veracruz | 50 m backstroke |
| Bronze medal – third place | 2018 Barranquilla | 4×100 m medley |
South American Games
| Gold medal – first place | 2018 Cochabamba | 50 m freestyle |
| Gold medal – first place | 2018 Cochabamba | 100 m freestyle |
| Gold medal – first place | 2018 Cochabamba | 100 m backstroke |
| Silver medal – second place | 2010 Medellín | 200 m backstroke |
| Silver medal – second place | 2018 Cochabamba | 4×100 m freestyle |
| Silver medal – second place | 2018 Cochabamba | 4×200 m freestyle |
| Silver medal – second place | 2018 Cochabamba | 4×100 m medley |
South American Championships
| Gold medal – first place | 2021 Buenos Aires | 50 m freestyle |
| Gold medal – first place | 2021 Buenos Aires | 50 m backstroke |
| Gold medal – first place | 2021 Buenos Aires | 100 m backstroke |
| Gold medal – first place | 2021 Buenos Aires | 4×100 m mixed medley |
| Silver medal – second place | 2016 Asunción | 4×100 m freestyle |
| Silver medal – second place | 2021 Buenos Aires | 100 m freestyle |
| Silver medal – second place | 2021 Buenos Aires | 4×100 m freestyle |
| Silver medal – second place | 2021 Buenos Aires | 4×100 m medley |
| Bronze medal – third place | 2016 Asunción | 100 m freestyle |
| Bronze medal – third place | 2016 Asunción | 4×200 m freestyle |
| Bronze medal – third place | 2016 Asunción | 4×100 m mixed freestyle |
Bolivarian Games
| Gold medal – first place | 2017 Santa Marta | 100 m freestyle |
| Gold medal – first place | 2017 Santa Marta | 100 m backstroke |
| Gold medal – first place | 2017 Santa Marta | 4×100 m freestyle |
| Gold medal – first place | 2017 Santa Marta | 4×100 m mixed medley |
| Silver medal – second place | 2017 Santa Marta | 50 m freestyle |
| Silver medal – second place | 2017 Santa Marta | 4×100 m medley |
| Silver medal – second place | 2017 Santa Marta | 4×100 m mixed freestyle |

Isabella Arcila Hurtado (born 11 March 1994) is a Colombian swimmer. She competed in the women's 50 metre freestyle event at the 2016 Summer Olympics. She competed at the 2020 Summer Olympics.
