= Miguel de Lara =

Mexican swimmer (born 1994)

Personal information
- Full name: Miguel Alejandro de Lara Ojeda
- Born: 9 August 1994 (age 32) Torreón, Mexico
- Height: 1.85 m (6 ft 1 in)

Sport
- Sport: Swimming
Medal record
Men's swimming
Representing Mexico
Pan American Games
| Bronze medal – third place | 2019 Lima | 200 m breaststroke |
| Bronze medal – third place | 2023 Santiago | 100 m breaststroke |
Central American and Caribbean Games
| Gold medal – first place | 2018 Barranquilla | 200 m breaststroke |
| Gold medal – first place | 2018 Barranquilla | 4×100 m medley |
| Gold medal – first place | 2023 San Salvador | 50 m breaststroke |
| Gold medal – first place | 2023 San Salvador | 100 m breaststroke |
| Gold medal – first place | 2023 San Salvador | 200 m breaststroke |
| Gold medal – first place | 2023 San Salvador | 4×100 m medley |
| Gold medal – first place | 2023 San Salvador | 4×100 m mixed medley |
| Silver medal – second place | 2014 Veracruz | 200 m breaststroke |
| Bronze medal – third place | 2014 Veracruz | 50 m breaststroke |
| Bronze medal – third place | 2014 Veracruz | 4×100 m medley |
| Bronze medal – third place | 2018 Barranquilla | 100 m breaststroke |

Miguel Alejandro de Lara Ojeda (born 9 August 1994) is a Mexican swimmer. He competed in the men's 50 metre breaststroke event at the 2017 World Aquatics Championships.
