= Renzo Tjon-A-Joe =

Surinamese-Dutch swimmer (born 1995)

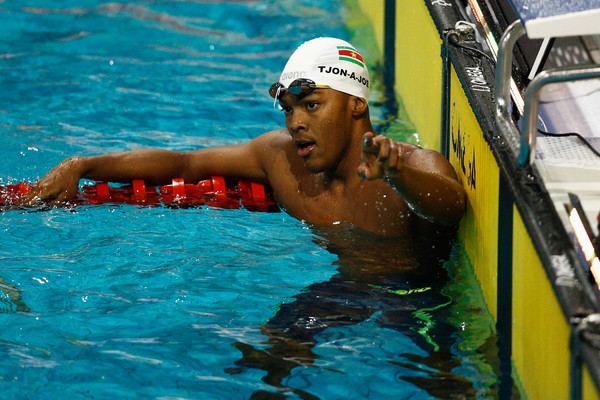
- Renzo Tjon A Joe At Swim Cup Eindhoven

Personal information
- Full name: Renzo Jair Tjon-A-Joe
- Nickname: Roos
- National team: Netherlands
- Born: 8 July 1995 (age 31) Paramaribo, Suriname
- Height: 1.93 m (6 ft 4 in)
- Weight: 83 kg (183 lb)

Sport
- Sport: Swimming
- Strokes: Butterfly, Freestyle
- Club: Auburn University (Alabama, USA)
Medal record
Men's swimming
Representing Suriname
Central American and Caribbean Games
Gold medal – first place	2018 Barranquilla	50 m freestyle
Silver medal – second place	2014 Veracruz	50 m freestyle
Bronze medal – third place	2014 Veracruz	50 m butterfly
South American Games
Gold medal – first place	2018 Cochabamba	50 m freestyle
Bronze medal – third place	2018 Cochabamba	100 m freestyle

Renzo Jair Tjon-A-Joe (born 8 July 1995) is a Surinamese-Dutch swimmer who mainly swims in 50 m and 100 m freestyle events. He competed at the 2016 and 2020 Summer Olympics for Suriname and at the 2024 Summer Olympics for the Netherlands after transferring allegiance in April 2024. Renzo is the fastest swimmer in Surinamese history in the 50 m and 100 m freestyle category.

== Biography ==
Suriname-born Renzo Tjon-A-Joe is his country's fastest swimmer to date. He made his first appearance on the world stage at the age of 18, as a member of the Surinamese selection for the 2013 Junior Worlds in Dubai, UAE. In Dubai, he was a finalist in the 50 m freestyle. He went on to be the most successful athlete from Suriname in 2013 and 2015 and was named 2013 and 2015 Male Athlete of the Year. In his country, he currently holds all national sprint records for the 50 m and 100 m freestyle in the long course and short course. Renzo previously trained at Auburn University in preparation for the 2016 Summer Olympics under the sprint coach Brett Hawke. He studied Economics at the Harvard Extension School for two years before dropping out and further pursuing his swim career. In 2018 Tjon A Joe completed a regional sprint trifecta- winning gold in the 50m Freestyle at the ODESUR South American Games, Central American and Caribbean Games and CCCAN Championships.

=== Personal bests ===
- Mexico, Veracruz, 2014 Central American& Caribbean Games, 50 m butterfly bronze medal,
- 50 m freestyle silver medal, 100 m freestyle 4th place, all national records
- Chile, 2014 Junior South American Championships, 50 m freestyle finalist, silver medal
- Dubai, 2013 Junior World Championship, 50 m freestyle finalist
- Dubai, 2013 Junior World Championship, 100 m freestyle, semi-finalist
- Jamaica, 2013, 50 m freestyle finalist, gold medal/new meet record
- Chile, 2013, South American Junior Championships 50 m freestyle finalist, silver medal
- USA, 2015 Arena Pro Swim Series Mesa, Arizona 50 m freestyle finalist with 22.53
- Cochabamba, 2018 South American Gold Medalist, 50 m freestyle

=== Achievements ===
- First Surinamer to swim under 50 seconds in 100 m freestyle ( SC-2014) and under 23 seconds in 50 m freestyle (LC-2013)
- Male Swimmer of the Year Suriname 2013
- Male Athlete of the Year Suriname 2013
- He broke a national record in 50 m freestyle at the 2013 Junior Worlds in Dubai (22.75)
- A-finalist in the 50 m freestyle at the Arena Grand Prix, Orlando, Florida (02/14)
- A-finalist in the 50 m freestyle at the Arena Grand Prix, Meza, Arizona (06/14)
- 1 September 2014 – training with the Auburn Pro Team at Auburn University.
- MBTA Man of the Year 2005
- Auburn University Swimming and Diving Coach: Brett Hawke
- Male Swimmer of the Year Suriname 2014
- Nominated in top 3 athletes of Suriname for Athlete of the Year 2014 Award
- Male Athlete of the Year Suriname 2015

== National records ==
Long Course (50-meter pool)
Event	Time	Meet	Location	Date
100 m Freestyle	49.29	Swim Cup	Eindhoven, Netherlands	7 April 2016
50 m Freestyle	22.23	Summer Olympics	Rio de Janeiro, Brazil	11 August 2016
50 m Butterfly	24.40	CAC Games	Veracruz, Mexico	17 November 2014
4 x 50 m Freestyle relay^{[a]}	1.35.30	CARIFTA Championships	Bridgetown, Barbados	7 April 2015

^{a} with Juan Limburg, Irvin Hoost, and Zuhayr Pigot

Short Course (25-meter pool)
Event	Time	Venue	Date
50m freestyle	21.90	Qatar	December 2012
100m freestyle	49.90	Suriname	June 2014
50m butterfly	24.48	Qatar	December 2014

== International competitions ==
=== 2014 Arena Grand Prix Series USA ===
- 02/2014: Orlando, Florida: 50 freestyle: A-Finalist, 8th : 22.98
- 02/2014: Orlando, FL: 100 freestyle: C-Finalist, 24th: 52.79
- 04/2014: Mesa, AZ: 50 freestyle: A-Finalist, 7th place 22.91
- 04/2014: Mesa, AZ: 100 freestyle: B-Finalist, 14th place 51.27

=== 2015 Arena Grand Prix Series USA ===
- 02/2015: Orlando, FL: 50 freestyle: B-Final, 2nd: 23.07 (10th overall)
- 02/2015: Orlando, FL: 100 freestyle: C-Final, 1st: 50.91 (8th overall)

=== Speedo Championship Series, USA ===
- 03/15: Plantation, FL: 50 freestyle: A-Final, 2nd: 23.14
- 03/15: Plantation, FL: 100 freestyle: A-Final, 3rd : 50.44

== Personal life ==
Tjon-A-Joe has an older brother named Maikel and a younger sister named Arantxa. He speaks Dutch, English and Sranan Tongo. He has said his favourite film is Pim De La Parra's Wan Pipel.
