= Melissa Rodríguez =

Mexican swimmer (born 1994)

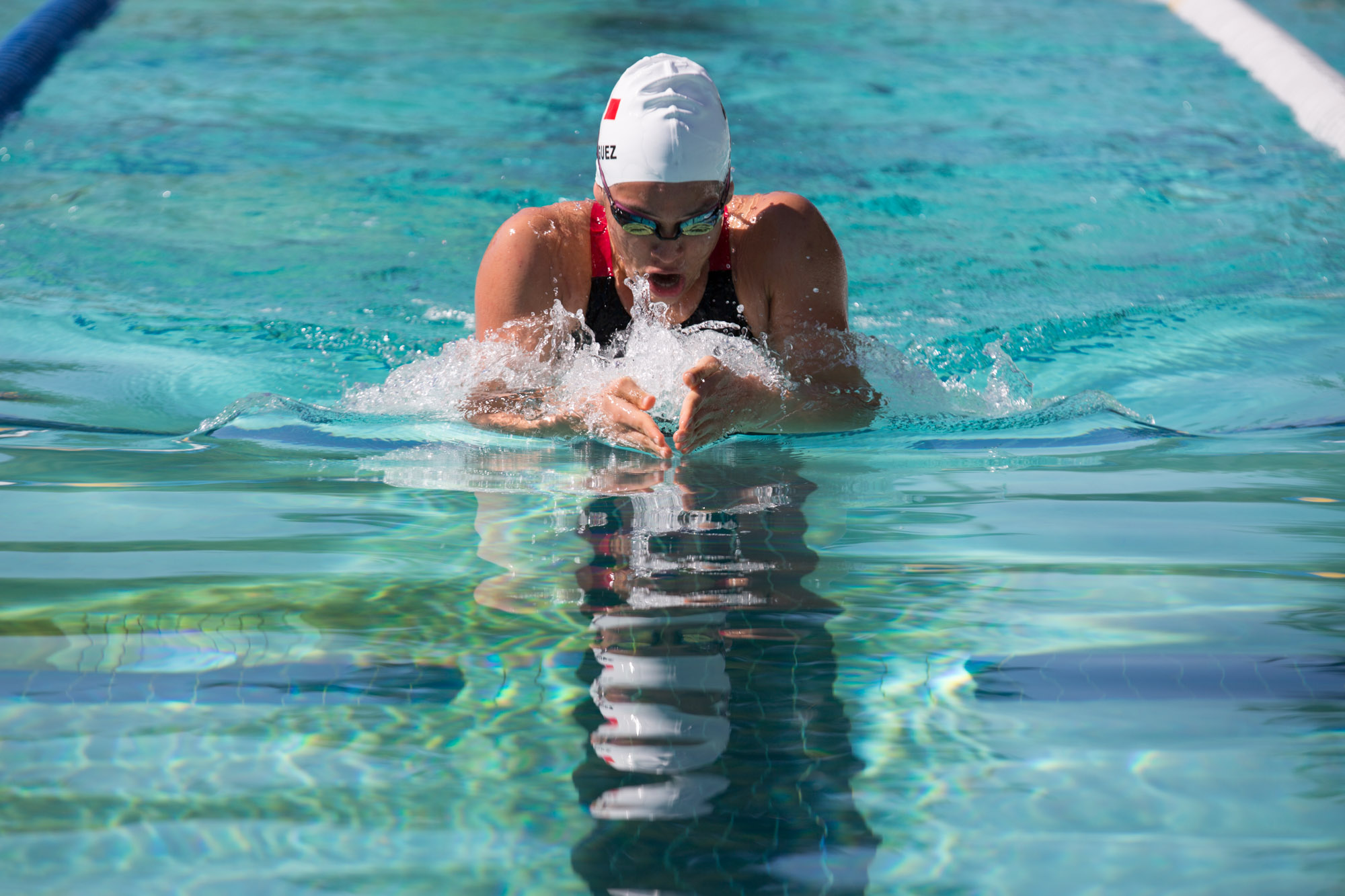

Personal information
- Full name: Byanca Melissa Rodríguez Villanueva
- Nationality: Mexico
- Born: September 13, 1994 (age 31) Chihuahua, Mexico
- Height: 174 cm (5 ft 9 in)

Sport
- Sport: Swimming
- Strokes: Breaststroke
- Club: Britania Desert Dragons
- College team: Penn State Nittany Lions (USA) (2013-2016)
- Coach: Nicolas Torres Perez
Medal record
Women's Swimming
Representing Mexico
Central American and Caribbean Games
Gold medal – first place	2014 Veracruz	50 m breaststroke
Gold medal – first place	2014 Veracruz	200 m breaststroke
Gold medal – first place	2023 San Salvador	200 m breaststroke
Gold medal – first place	2023 San Salvador	4×100 m medley
Silver medal – second place	2010 Mayagüez	200 m breaststroke
Silver medal – second place	2014 Veracruz	100 m breaststroke
Silver medal – second place	2023 San Salvador	50 m breaststroke
Silver medal – second place	2023 San Salvador	100 m breaststroke
Bronze medal – third place	2010 Mayagüez	100 m breaststroke
Pan American Games
Bronze medal – third place	2023 Santiago	4x100 m medley

Byanca Melissa Rodríguez Villanueva (Note: In this Spanish name, the first or paternal surname is Rodríguez and the second or maternal family name is Villanueva.) (born September 13, 1994), commonly known as Melissa Rodríguez, is a National record-holding breaststroke swimmer from Mexico.

== Career ==
As of November 2014, Rodríguez holds the Mexican Records in the long-course (50m) 50 and 100 breaststrokes.

At the 2014 Central American and Caribbean Games, she set the Games Records by winning the 50 breaststroke event (32.21).

== See also ==
List of Pennsylvania State University Olympians
