= Jeserik Pinto =

Venezuelan swimmer (born 1990)

Personal information
- Born: 21 March 1990 (age 36)

Sport
- Sport: Swimming
Medal record
Women's swimming
Representing Venezuela
Central American and Caribbean Games
Gold medal – first place	2010 Mayagüez	4×100 m freestyle
Silver medal – second place	2018 Barranquilla	50 m butterfly
Silver medal – second place	2018 Barranquilla	4×100 m medley
Silver medal – second place	2018 Barranquilla	Mixed 4×100 m freestyle
Bronze medal – third place	2010 Mayagüez	50 m butterfly
Bronze medal – third place	2014 Veracruz	50 m butterfly
Bronze medal – third place	2014 Veracruz	4×100 m freestyle
Bronze medal – third place	2014 Veracruz	4×100 m medley
Bronze medal – third place	2018 Barranquilla	4×100 m freestyle
Bronze medal – third place	2018 Barranquilla	Mixed 4×100 m medley
Bolivarian Games
Gold medal – first place	2013 Trujillo	50 m backstroke
Gold medal – first place	2013 Trujillo	50 m butterfly
Gold medal – first place	2013 Trujillo	4×100 m freestyle
Silver medal – second place	2013 Trujillo	50 m freestyle
Silver medal – second place	2013 Trujillo	4×100 m medley
Bronze medal – third place	2013 Trujillo	100 m backstroke
Bronze medal – third place	2013 Trujillo	100 m butterfly
Pan American Games
Bronze medal – third place	2007 Rio de Janeiro	4×100 m freestyle
South American Championships
Silver medal – second place	2021 Buenos Aires	50 m freestyle
Silver medal – second place	2021 Buenos Aires	50 m butterfly
Bronze medal – third place	2012 Belém	50 m backstroke
Bronze medal – third place	2012 Belém	50 m butterfly
Bronze medal – third place	2016 Asunción	50 m backstroke
Bronze medal – third place	2016 Asunción	4×100 m medley
South American Games
Gold medal – first place	2018 Cochabamba	100 m butterfly
Bronze medal – third place	2018 Cochabamba	50 m freestyle
Bronze medal – third place	2018 Cochabamba	100 m freestyle
Bronze medal – third place	2018 Cochabamba	4×100 m freestyle

Jeserik Andreína Pinto Sequera (born 21 March 1990) is a Venezuelan swimmer. She competed in the women's 50 metre backstroke event at the 2017 World Aquatics Championships.
