= Joanna Evans (swimmer) =

Bahamian swimmer (born 1997)

Personal information
- National team: Bahamas
- Born: 25 July 1997 (age 29) Freeport, Bahamas
- Height: 180 cm (5 ft 11 in)
- Weight: 66 kg (146 lb)

Sport
- Sport: Swimming
- Strokes: Freestyle
- College team: Texas Longhorns
- Coach: Carol Capitani; Roric Fink
Medal record
Representing the Bahamas
Summer Universiade
Silver medal – second place	2017 Taipei	400 m freestyle
Bronze medal – third place	2017 Taipei	800 m freestyle
Youth Olympic Games
Bronze medal – third place	2014 Nanjing	800 m freestyle
Central American and Caribbean Games
Gold medal – first place	2018 Barranquilla	200 m Freestyle
Gold medal – first place	2018 Barranquilla	400 m Freestyle
Gold medal – first place	2018 Barranquilla	800 m Freestyle
Silver medal – second place	2014 Veracruz	400 m Freestyle
Silver medal – second place	2014 Veracruz	800 m Freestyle
Silver medal – second place	2018 Barranquilla	100 m freestyle
Silver medal – second place	2018 Barranquilla	400 m individual medley

Joanna Evans (born 25 July 1997) is a Bahamian competitive swimmer who specializes in freestyle. She qualified for the 2016 Summer Olympics in Rio de Janeiro in the 200, 400, and 800 meter freestyle events. In the 200 and 400 meter, she set new national records.

Evans studied engineering at the University of Texas at Austin. In 2014, she was named Bahamas Junior Swimmer of the Year.

She competed at the 2020 Summer Olympics in the 200m freestyle and 400m freestyle. She did not progress past the heats in either event.

Evans served a four-year competition ban that expired in February 2026 for an anti-rule doping violation after testing positive for clostebol. She initially received a two-year ban in April 2023 for "unintentional use", which she took to an appeal at the Court of Arbitration for Sport (CAS). However, that tribunal dismissed the original ban and increased it to four years, as they did not accept the unintentional use defence. Evans expressed disappointment with WADA's handling of the case, claiming it damaged her career and reputation.

Evans competed for the first time since the expiration of the ban in March 2026, where she swam the 200m and 400m freestyle in Nassau, Bahamas at the age of 28.

Olympic Games
Preceded by Shaunae Miller	Flag bearer for Bahamas; Tokyo 2020 with Donald Thomas	Succeeded by Devynne Charlton; Steven Gardiner
