= Carlos Omaña =

Venezuelan swimmer

Personal information
- Born: 8 February 1993 (age 33)

Sport
- Sport: Swimming

Carlos Omaña (born 8 February 1993) is a Venezuelan swimmer. He competed in the men's 200 metre backstroke event at the 2017 World Aquatics Championships.
