= South American Swimming Championships =

Biennial aquatics championships

The South American Swimming Championships are a biennial aquatics championships (held in even years) for countries from CONSANAT (the South American Swimming Confederation). These championships include competition in swimming, diving, synchronized swimming, water polo, and open water swimming.

== Countries ==
CONSANAT member countries participate in these Championships:

- Argentina
- Bolivia
- Brazil
- Chile
- Colombia
- Ecuador
- Guyana
- Paraguay
- Peru
- Suriname
- Uruguay
- Venezuela

== Championships ==
2006 Open water swimming in Cartagena and 2010 in South American Games.

Year	Number	Host City	Host Country	Events
1929	1	Santiago	Chile	
1934	2	Buenos Aires	Argentina	
1935	3	Rio de Janeiro	Brazil	
1937	4	Montevideo	Uruguay	
1938	5	Lima	Peru	
1939	6	Guayaquil	Ecuador	
1941	7	Viña del Mar	Chile	
1946	8	Rio de Janeiro	Brazil	
1947	9	Buenos Aires	Argentina	
1949	10	Montevideo	Uruguay	
1952	11	Lima	Peru	
1956	12	Viña del Mar	Chile	
1958	13	Montevideo	Uruguay	
1960	14	Cali	Colombia	
1962	15	Buenos Aires	Argentina	
1963	16	Viña del Mar	Chile	
1965	17	Rio de Janeiro	Brazil	
1966	18	Lima	Peru	
1968	19	Rio de Janeiro	Brazil	
1970	20	Lima	Peru	
1972	21	Arica	Chile	
1974	22	Medellín	Colombia	
1976	23	Maldonado	Uruguay	
1978	24	Guayaquil	Ecuador	
1980	25	Buenos Aires	Argentina	
1982	26	La Paz	Bolivia	
1984	27	Rio de Janeiro	Brazil	
1986	28	Santiago	Chile	
1988	29	Medellín	Colombia	
1990	30	Rosario	Argentina	

Year	Number	Host City	Host Country	Events
1992	31	Medellín	Colombia	
1994	32	Maldonado	Uruguay	
1996	33	Porto Alegre	Brazil	
1998	34	San Felipe	Venezuela	
2000	35	Mar del Plata	Argentina	
2002	36	Belém	Brazil	
2004	37	Maldonado	Uruguay	
2006	38	Medellín	Colombia	
2008	39	São Paulo	Brazil	
2010	40	Medellín	Colombia	
2012	41	Belém	Brazil	40
2014	42	Mar del Plata	Argentina	40
2016	43	Asunción	Paraguay	42
2018	44	Trujillo	Peru	42
2021	45	Buenos Aires	Argentina	41
2024	46	Cali	Colombia	42

== Championships records ==
All records were set in finals unless noted otherwise. All times are swum in a long-course (50m) pool.

=== Men ===
Event	Time	Name	Nationality	Date	Meet	Location	Ref
50m freestyle	21.85	César Cielo	Brazil	16 March 2012	2012 Championships	Belém, Brazil	
100m freestyle	48.70	César Cielo	Brazil	17 March 2012	2012 Championships	Belém, Brazil	
200m freestyle	1:47.39	Federico Grabich	Argentina	30 March 2016	2016 Championships	Asunción, Paraguay	
400m freestyle	3:51.33	Luiz Altamir Melo	Brazil	31 March 2016	2016 Championships	Asunción, Paraguay	
800m freestyle	7:58.23	Esteban Enderica Salgado	Ecuador	2 October 2014	2014 Championships	Mar del Plata, Argentina	
1500m freestyle	15:08.57	Esteban Enderica	Ecuador	3 April 2016	2016 Championships	Asunción, Paraguay	
50m backstroke	25.01	Guilherme Guido	Brazil	10 November 2018	2018 Championships	Trujillo, Peru	
100m backstroke	53.40	Guilherme Guido	Brazil	30 March 2016	2016 Championships	Asunción, Paraguay	
200m backstroke	1:59.47	Fábio Santi	Brazil	31 March 2016	2016 Championships	Asunción, Paraguay	
50m breaststroke	27.12	Felipe Lima	Brazil	8 November 2018	2018 Championships	Trujillo, Peru	
100m breaststroke	59.87	Felipe Lima	Brazil	7 November 2018	2018 Championships	Trujillo, Peru	
200m breaststroke	2:10.44	Carlos Claverie	Venezuela	3 April 2016	2016 Championships	Asunción, Paraguay	
50m butterfly	23.26	César Cielo	Brazil	14 March 2012	2012 Championships	Belém, Brazil	
100m butterfly	51.90	Albert Subirats	Venezuela	3 April 2016	2016 Championships	Asunción, Paraguay	
200m butterfly	1:57.71	Jonathan Gómez	Colombia	9 November 2018	2018 Championships	Trujillo, Peru	
200m individual medley	1:58.49	Thiago Pereira	Brazil	16 March 2012	2012 Championships	Belém, Brazil	
400m individual medley	4:17.46	Thiago Pereira	Brazil	15 March 2008	2008 Championships	São Paulo, Brazil	
4×100m freestyle relay	3:17.54	Federico Grabich (48.98); Matías Aguilera (49.64); Lautaro Rodriguez (49.59); Guido Buscaglia (49.33)	Argentina	30 March 2016	2016 Championships	Asunción, Paraguay	
4×200m freestyle relay	7:22.97	Giuliano Rocco (1:50.58); Joao de Lucca (1:52.07); Kaue Carvalho (1:51.70); Breno Correia (1:48.62)	Brazil	10 November 2018	2018 Championships	Trujillo, Peru	
4×100m medley relay	3:36.88	Robinson Molina; Carlos Claverie; Albert Subirats; Cristian Quintero	Venezuela	3 April 2016	2016 Championships	Asunción, Paraguay	

Legend: # – Record awaiting ratification by CONSANAT; WR – World record; AM – Americas record;
Records not set in finals: h – heat; sf – semifinal; r – relay 1st leg; rh – relay heat 1st leg; b – B final; † – en route to final mark; tt – time trial

=== Women ===
Event	Time	Name	Nationality	Date	Meet	Location	Ref
50m freestyle	24.80	Etiene Medeiros	Brazil	1 April 2016	2016 Championships	Asunción, Paraguay	
100m freestyle	54.83	Etiene Medeiros	Brazil	2 April 2016	2016 Championships	Asunción, Paraguay	
200m freestyle	1:58.94	Manuella Lyrio	Brazil	30 March 2016	2016 Championships	Asunción, Paraguay	
400m freestyle	4:07.17	Andreina Pinto	Venezuela	31 March 2016	2016 Championships	Asunción, Paraguay	
800m freestyle	8:32.31	Andreina Pinto	Venezuela	3 April 2016	2016 Championships	Asunción, Paraguay	
1500m freestyle	16:06.78	Kristel Köbrich	Chile	18 March 2021	2021 Championships	Buenos Aires, Argentina	
50m backstroke	28.11	Andrea Berrino	Argentina	2 April 2016	2016 Championships	Asunción, Paraguay	
100m backstroke	1:00.38	Etiene Medeiros	Brazil	30 March 2016	2016 Championships	Asunción, Paraguay	
200m backstroke	2:13.47	Andrea Berrino	Argentina	31 March 2016	2016 Championships	Asunción, Paraguay	
50m breaststroke	31.27	Macarena Ceballos	Argentina	18 March 2021	2021 Championships	Buenos Aires, Argentina	
100m breaststroke	1:08.25	Macarena Ceballos	Argentina	7 November 2018	2018 Championships	Trujillo, Peru	
200m breaststroke	2:26.54	Julia Sebastian	Argentina	11 November 2018	2018 Championships	Trujillo, Peru	
50m butterfly	26.53	Daiene Dias	Brazil	2 April 2016	2016 Championships	Asunción, Paraguay	
100m butterfly	59.11	Daynara de Paula	Brazil	3 April 2016	2016 Championships	Asunción, Paraguay	
200m butterfly	2:09.92	Andreina Pinto	Venezuela	1 April 2016	2016 Championships	Asunción, Paraguay	
200m individual medley	2:13.46	Virginia Bardach	Argentina	30 March 2016	2016 Championships	Asunción, Paraguay	
400m individual medley	4:41.39	Joanna Maranhão	Brazil	15 March 2012	2012 Championships	Belém, Brazil	
4×100m freestyle relay	3:43.91	Graciele Herrmann (56.57); Daynara de Paula (56.07); Manuella Lyrio (55.15); Etiene Medeiros (56.12)	Brazil	30 March 2016	2016 Championships	Asunción, Paraguay	
4×200m freestyle relay	8:04.29	Joanna Maranhão (2:00.65); Jéssica Cavalheiro (2:00.69); Bruna Primati (2:03.19); Manuella Lyrio (1:59.76)	Brazil	2 April 2016	2016 Championships	Asunción, Paraguay	
4×100m medley relay	4:07.48	Andrea Berrino; Macarena Ceballos; Virginia Bardach; María Belén Díaz	Argentina	3 April 2016	2016 Championships	Asunción, Paraguay	

Legend: # – Record awaiting ratification by CONSANAT; WR – World record; AM – Americas record;
Records not set in finals: h – heat; sf – semifinal; r – relay 1st leg; rh – relay heat 1st leg; b – B final; † – en route to final mark; tt – time trial

=== Mixed relay ===
Event	Time	Name	Club	Date	Meet	Location	Ref
4×100m freestyle relay	3:30.81	Breno Correia (49.22); João de Lucca (48.86); Daynara de Paula (56.64); Rafaela Raurich (56.09)	Brazil	9 November 2018	2018 Championships	Trujillo, Peru	
4×100m medley relay	3:51.05	Guilherme Guido (54.73); Felipe Lima (59.77); Daynara de Paula (59.63); Rafaela Raurich (56.92)	Brazil	8 November 2018	2018 Championships	Trujillo, Peru	

Legend: # – Record awaiting ratification by CONSANAT; WR – World record; AM – Americas record;
Records not set in finals: h – heat

== See also ==
- South American Aquatics Championships
- South American Masters Aquatics Championships
- South American Juniors Aquatics Championships
- Central American and Caribbean Swimming Championships
- Caribbean Islands Swimming Championships
- Pan American Water Polo Championships
- South American Water Polo Championships
- South American Games
