= Isabella Páez =

Venezuelan swimmer (born 1995)

Personal information
- Born: 29 August 1995 (age 30) Caracas, Venezuela

Sport
- Sport: Swimming
- College team: Duke University
Medal record
Women's swimming
Representing Venezuela
Central American and Caribbean Games
Gold medal – first place	2018 Barranquilla	200 m butterfly
Silver medal – second place	2018 Barranquilla	100 m butterfly
Silver medal – second place	2018 Barranquilla	4×100 m medley
Bronze medal – third place	2018 Barranquilla	4×100 m mixed medley

Isabella Páez (born 29 August 1995) is a Venezuelan swimmer. She competed in the women's 200 metre butterfly event at the 2018 FINA World Swimming Championships (25 m), in Hangzhou, China.
