= Daniel Ramírez =

Mexican swimmer (born 1992)

Personal information
- Full name: Daniel Zabdiel Ramírez Carranza
- Born: 21 December 1992 (age 33) Hermosillo, Mexico

Sport
- Sport: Swimming
Medal record
Men's swimming
Representing Mexico
Pan American Games
Bronze medal – third place	2019 Lima	4×100 m freestyle
Bronze medal – third place	2019 Lima	4×100 m mixed freestyle

Daniel Zabdiel Ramírez Carranza (born 21 December 1992) is a Mexican swimmer. He competed in the men's 100 metre freestyle event at the 2017 World Aquatics Championships.
