= Cristian Quintero (swimmer) =

Venezuelan swimmer (born 1992)

Personal information
- Full name: Cristian Daniel Quintero Valero
- Born: October 14, 1992 (age 33) Maracay, Venezuela

Sport
- Sport: Swimming
Medal record
Representing Venezuela
Summer Youth Olympics
Silver medal – second place	2010 Singapore	200m freestyle
Pan American Games
Bronze medal – third place	2011 Guadalajara	400m freestyle
Bronze medal – third place	2011 Guadalajara	4x100m freestyle relay
Bronze medal – third place	2011 Guadalajara	4x200m freestyle relay
Central American and Caribbean Games
Gold medal – first place	2010 Mayaguez	400m freestyle
Gold medal – first place	2010 Mayaguez	4x100m freestyle relay
Gold medal – first place	2014 Veracruz	200m freestyle
Gold medal – first place	2014 Veracruz	4x100m freestyle relay
Gold medal – first place	2014 Veracruz	4x100m medley relay
Bronze medal – third place	2014 Veracruz	400m freestyle
South American Games
Gold medal – first place	2010 Medellin	4x100m freestyle relay
Gold medal – first place	2010 Medellin	4x200m freestyle relay

Cristian Daniel Quintero Valero (born 14 October 1992) is a Venezuelan swimmer. He is a member of the Venezuela national team, and represented his country at the London 2012 Summer Olympics. Quintero won a silver medal at the 2010 Summer Youth Olympics for the 200 yard freestyle. He won gold medals in the 2010 South American Games as a part of the Venezuela's 400 meter and 800 meter freestyle relay teams. Quintero is currently a student athlete at the University of Southern California.

== See also ==
- USC Trojans
- Venezuela at the Olympics
