= 2018 Central American and Caribbean Games =

23rd edition of the Central American and Caribbean Games

- Host city: Barranquilla
- Country: Colombia
- Nations: 37
- Athletes: 5854
- Events: 450
- Opening: 19 July 2018
- Closing: 3 August 2018
- Opened by: President Juan Manuel Santos
- Athlete's Oath: Alex Cujavante
- Judge's Oath: Magaly Peña
- Torch lighter: Édgar Rentería
- Main venue: Estadio Metropolitano Roberto Meléndez
- Website: Barranquilla2018.com

The 2018 Central American and Caribbean Games (Spanish: Juegos Deportivos Centroamericanos y del Caribe Barranquilla 2018), also known as the 23rd Central American and Caribbean Games and commonly known as Barranquilla 2018, was the 23rd edition of the Central American and Caribbean Games, a quadrennial sports multi-sport event which was held from 19 July 2018 to 3 August 2018 in Barranquilla, Colombia.

== Bidding process ==
Quetzaltenango was the only city to meet CACSO's January 2012 deadline to bid for the Games, and on October 29, 2012 it was named the host city.

Guatemala last hosted the Games in 1950 (in Guatemala City); Central America last hosted in 2002 (in San Salvador, El Salvador). Panajachel would be the venue for sailing, open water swimming and triathlon. Quetzaltenango was officially stripped from its hosting rights in May 2014.

Meanwhile, the Colombian City of Santiago de Cali has sent a formal request to the CACSO committee to host the 2018 Central American and Caribbean Games (due to the success of the 2013 World Games) in case that Quetzaltenango was unable to meet with the event's logistics. In addition, sports venues in Santiago de Cali were completely built and in excellent condition, while Quetzaltenango was having delays in its venue preparation.

A second bidding phase was opened to find the new hosts for the Games. Panama City (Panama), Puerto la Cruz (Venezuela), and Barranquilla (Colombia) were bidding to host the Games. Barranquilla was voted as the hosts for the Games during a CACSO meeting in Veracruz, Mexico.

== Participating countries ==
The following 37 nations took part. For the first time in the Central American and Caribbean Games, six Caribbean territories of European Countries competed, having reached agreement with ODACABE. These territories being: the three French territories of Guadeloupe, Martinique, and French Guiana, the British Territory of Turks and Caicos, and the two Dutch territories of Curaçao and Sint Maarten.

Participating National Olympic Committees
- Antigua and Barbuda (10)
- Aruba (20)
- Bahamas (72)
- Barbados (113)
- Belize (6)
- Bermuda (14)
- British Virgin Islands (13)
- Cayman Islands (18)
- Colombia (555) (host)
- Costa Rica (219)
- Cuba (515)
- Curaçao (38)
- Dominica (6)
- Dominican Republic (459)
- El Salvador (172)
- French Guiana (2)
- Grenada (3)
- Guadeloupe (26)
- Guatemala (396)
- Guyana (78)
- Haiti (72)
- Honduras (134)
- Jamaica (101)
- Martinique (8)
- Mexico (653)
- Nicaragua (142)
- Panama (107)
- Puerto Rico (354)
- Saint Kitts and Nevis (2)
- Saint Lucia (6)
- Saint Vincent and the Grenadines (10)
- Sint Maarten (6)
- Suriname (8)
- Trinidad and Tobago (217)
- Turks and Caicos Islands (8)
- United States Virgin Islands (47)
- Venezuela (443)

== Games ==
- Aquatics
  - Artistic swimming (7)
  - Diving (8)
  - Open water swimming (2)
  - Swimming (40)
  - Water polo (2)
- Archery (10)
- Athletics (46)
- Badminton (6)
- Baseball (1)
- Basketball (2)
  - 3x3 basketball (2)
- Beach volleyball (2)
- Bowling (10)
- Boxing (15)
- Canoeing (9)
- Cycling
  - BMX (2)
  - Mountain biking (2)
  - Road (4)
  - Track (19)
- Equestrian (9)
- Fencing (12)
- Field hockey (2)
- Football (2)
- Golf (2)
- Gymnastics
  - Artistic gymnastics (14)
  - Rhythmic gymnastics (8)
  - Trampoline (3)
- Handball (2)
- Judo (18)
- Karate (12)
- Modern pentathlon (5)
- Racquetball (6)
- Roller sports (12)
- Rowing (11)
- Rugby sevens (2)
- Sailing (7)
- Shooting (33)
- Squash (7)
- Softball (2)
- Table tennis (7)
- Taekwondo (21)
- Tennis (7)
- Triathlon (5)
- Volleyball (2)
- Weightlifting (32)
- Wrestling (18)

== Medal table ==
* Host nation (Colombia)

2018 Central American and Caribbean Games medal table
Rank	Nation	Gold	Silver	Bronze	Total
1	Mexico	132	118	91	341
2	Cuba	102	72	68	242
3	Colombia*	79	94	97	270
4	Venezuela	34	48	73	155
5	Dominican Republic	25	29	53	107
6	Guatemala	21	22	41	84
7	Puerto Rico	20	29	38	87
8	Jamaica	12	4	11	27
9	Trinidad and Tobago	9	8	13	30
10	Bahamas	4	2	1	7
11	Panama	3	5	5	13
12	El Salvador	2	5	11	18
13	Aruba	2	1	6	9
14	Barbados	2	0	4	6
15	Costa Rica	1	6	19	26
16	British Virgin Islands	1	1	1	3
17	Suriname	1	0	1	2
18	Saint Lucia	1	0	0	1
19	Bermuda	0	2	1	3
20	Honduras	0	1	5	6
21	Saint Kitts and Nevis	0	1	1	2
22	Grenada	0	1	0	1
22	Haiti	0	1	0	1
24	Nicaragua	0	0	9	9
25	Cayman Islands	0	0	3	3
26	Antigua and Barbuda	0	0	1	1
26	Guadeloupe	0	0	1	1
26	Guyana	0	0	1	1
26	Martinique	0	0	1	1
26	U.S. Virgin Islands	0	0	1	1
Totals (30 entries)		451	450	557	1,458

== Marketing ==
=== Mascots ===
The mascot for the Games was Baqui the titi monkey.
