= 2014 Central American and Caribbean Games =

22nd edition of the Central American and Caribbean Games

- Host city: Veracruz
- Country: Mexico
- Motto: Live, Share, Inspire; Spanish: Vive, Comparte, Inspira
- Teams: 31 Countries
- Athletes: 5,707 Athletes
- Events: 36 Sports
- Opening: 14 November 2014
- Closing: 30 November 2014
- Opened by: Miguel Ángel Osorio Chong
- Athlete's Oath: Santiago González
- Judge's Oath: Enrique Borrego
- Torch lighter: María Espinoza
- Main venue: Estadio Luis "Pirata" Fuente
- Website: www.veracruz2014.mx

The 22nd Central American and Caribbean Games were held November 14–30, 2014 in Veracruz, Mexico. The Games featured 36 sports, with most occurred in Veracruz, but some occurred in Boca del Río, Xalapa, Córdoba, Tuxpan, and Coatzacoalcos.

== Participating countries ==
The following 31 countries took part in this editionː

Participating National Olympic Committees
- Antigua and Barbuda (12)
- Aruba (33)
- Bahamas (58)
- Barbados (102)
- Belize (10)
- Bermuda (43)
- British Virgin Islands (5)
- Cayman Islands (48)
- Colombia (431)
- Costa Rica (302)
- Cuba (624)
- Dominica (13)
- Dominican Republic (488)
- El Salvador (188)
- Grenada (15)
- Guatemala (404)
- Guyana (43)
- Haiti (80)
- Honduras (86)
- Jamaica (144)
- Mexico (732) (host)
- Nicaragua (164)
- Panama (139)
- Puerto Rico (364)
- Saint Kitts and Nevis (21)
- Saint Lucia (15)
- Saint Vincent and the Grenadines (15)
- Suriname (16)
- Trinidad and Tobago (213)
- United States Virgin Islands (40)
- Venezuela (577)

== Games ==
- Archery
- Athletics
- Badminton
- Baseball
- Basketball
- Basque Pelota
- Beach volleyball
- Bowling
- Boxing
- Canoeing
- Cycling
  - BMX (2)
  - Mountain biking (2)
  - Road (4)
  - Track (10)
- Diving
- Equestrian
- Fencing
- Field hockey
- Football
- Golf
- Gymnastics
  - Artistic gymnastics
  - Rhythmic gymnastics
  - Trampoline
- Handball
- Judo
- Karate
- Modern pentathlon
- Racquetball
- Roller sports
- Rowing
- Rugby sevens
- Sailing
- Shooting
- Squash
- Softball
- Swimming
- Synchronized swimming
- Table tennis
- Taekwondo
- Tennis
- Triathlon
- Volleyball
- Water polo
- Weightlifting
- Wrestling

== Medal table ==
* Host nation (Mexico)

2014 Central American and Caribbean Games medal table
Rank	Nation	Gold	Silver	Bronze	Total
1	Cuba (CUB)	123	66	65	254
2	Mexico (MEX)*	115	106	111	332
3	Colombia (COL)	72	74	78	224
4	Venezuela (VEN)	53	81	108	242
5	Dominican Republic (DOM)	21	33	25	79
6	Puerto Rico (PRI)	15	24	45	84
7	Guatemala (GTM)	15	19	43	77
8	Bahamas (BHS)	4	3	1	8
9	El Salvador (SLV)	2	9	12	23
10	Trinidad and Tobago (TTO)	2	1	8	11
11	Aruba (ABW)	2	1	1	4
12	Costa Rica (CRI)	1	3	11	15
13	Honduras (HND)	1	2	9	12
14	Panama (PAN)	1	2	4	7
15	U.S. Virgin Islands (VIR)	1	2	3	6
16	Dominica (DMA)	1	0	1	2
17	British Virgin Islands (VGB)	1	0	0	1
17	Cayman Islands (CYM)	1	0	0	1
17	Saint Lucia (LCA)	1	0	0	1
20	Nicaragua (NIC)	0	2	5	7
21	Barbados (BRB)	0	1	3	4
21	Jamaica (JAM)	0	1	3	4
21	Suriname (SUR)	0	1	3	4
24	Antigua and Barbuda (ATG)	0	1	0	1
25	Haiti (HTI)	0	0	3	3
26	Guyana (GUY)	0	0	2	2
27	Belize (BLZ)	0	0	0	0
27	Bermuda (BMU)	0	0	0	0
27	Grenada (GRD)	0	0	0	0
27	Saint Kitts and Nevis (KNA)	0	0	0	0
27	Saint Vincent and the Grenadines (VCT)	0	0	0	0
Totals (31 entries)		432	432	544	1,408

== Marketing ==
=== Mascots ===
The official mascots for the Games were Toto, a smiling figure, and Bamba the iguana.

== Broadcasters ==
Territory	Rights holder	Ref
Colombia	Señal Colombia	
Cuba	Tele Rebelde	
El Salvador	Canal 4	
Guatemala	Guatevisión	
Honduras	Canal 11	
Mexico	Claro Sports; Televisa; TVMás	
Puerto Rico	Telemundo; WIPR	
Venezuela	TVes	
(Caribbean Community) Caribbean	SportsMax	

Rest of the world

Territory and Rights holder
Territory	Rights holder	System
Europe	RTVE, ARD, RTL, ZDF, ORF, SRG, NOS, Digi TV (TV channel) M4 Sport, TVP, TNT, TNT HD, STVR, TV SLO 1, 2, 3, 4, CT Sport, OGN, TF1, M6, Deutsche Telekom, BBC, ITV, Channel 4, Channel 5.	Both HD
Australasia & Africa	TBS, NHK, U-Next, FUJI TV, Seven Network, Nine Network, Ten Network, CCTV Network, SBS, KBS, CCTV-1.	
More countries from Central American and Carribean Games	ESPN, TBS, Spike TV, Dsports and more...!	
