= List of Central American and Caribbean Championships records in swimming =

The Central American and Caribbean Championships records in swimming are the fastest times ever swum in the Caribbean and Central American region Championships, which are recognised and ratified by the CCCAN. All times are swum in a long-course (50m) pool.

All records were set in finals unless noted otherwise. All times are swum in a long-course (50m) pool.

== Boys (11-12) ==
Event	Time		Name	Nationality	Date	Meet	Location	Ref
50m freestyle	24.93		Andres Doria	Venezuela	4 July 2009	XXVI CCCAN	Barquisimeto, Venezuela	
100m freestyle	55.12	h	Andres Doria	Venezuela	1 July 2009	XXVI CCCAN	Barquisimeto, Venezuela	
200m freestyle	2:01.46		Dylan Carter	Trinidad and Tobago	2 July 2009	XXVI CCCAN	Barquisimeto, Venezuela	
400m freestyle	4:18.73		Luis Corona	Mexico	2 July 2019	XXXII CCCAN	Bridgetown, Barbados	
50m backstroke	29.83		Harrison Olle	Panama	27 June 2011	XXVII CCCAN	Mayagüez, Puerto Rico	
100m backstroke	1:03.05		Amauri Rodríguez	Mexico	July 2003	XXIII CCCAN	Mexico City, Mexico	
200m backstroke	2:18.49		Eumir Quintero	Mexico	August 2005	XXIV CCCAN	Santo Domingo, Dominican Republic	
50m breaststroke	32.15		Nigel Forbes	Bahamas	2 July 2018	XXXI CCCAN	Savaneta, Aruba	
100m breaststroke	1:11.16		Nigel Forbes	Bahamas	3 July 2018	XXXI CCCAN	Savaneta, Aruba	
200m breaststroke	2:35.89		Carlos Claverie	Venezuela	29 June 2009	XXVI CCCAN	Barquisimeto, Venezuela	
50m butterfly	27.30		Andres Doria	Venezuela	30 June 2009	XXVI CCCAN	Barquisimeto, Venezuela	
100m butterfly	1:01.83		Eumir Quintero	Mexico	August 2005	XXIV CCCAN	Santo Domingo, Dominican Republic	
200m butterfly	2:16.15		Carlos Corpi	Mexico	July 2001	XXII CCCAN	Dominican Republic	
200m individual medley	2:19.15		Oscar Olivera	Mexico	July 2001	XXII CCCAN	Dominican Republic	
4×100m freestyle relay	3:50.92		Diego López; Jesus González; Andres Doria; Miguel Roqué	Venezuela	2 July 2009	XXVI CCCAN	Barquisimeto, Venezuela	
4×100m medley relay	4:22.69		Robert Alfonzo; Carlos Claverie; Miguel Roqué; Andres Doria	Venezuela	3 July 2009	XXVI CCCAN	Barquisimeto, Venezuela	

Legend: # – Record awaiting ratification by CCCAN;
Records not set in finals: h – heat; r – relay 1st leg; rh – relay heat 1st leg; † – en route to final mark; tt – time trial

== Girls (11-12) ==
Event	Time		Name	Nationality	Date	Meet	Location	Ref
50m freestyle	26.82		Jillian Crooks	Cayman Islands	3 July 2018	XXXI CCCAN	Savaneta, Aruba	
100m freestyle	59.65		Elan Daley	Bermuda	1 July 2017	XXX CCCAN	Couva, Trinidad and Tobago	
200m freestyle	2:08.51		Marisela Escobar	Mexico	10 July 2022	XXXIV CCCAN	Bridgetown, Barbados	
400m freestyle	4:31.68		Marisela Escobar	Mexico	13 July 2022	XXXIV CCCAN	Bridgetown, Barbados	
50m backstroke	30.78		Gabriela Donahue	Trinidad and Tobago	25 June 2015	XXIX CCCAN	Bridgetown, Barbados	
100m backstroke	1:07.14		Danielle Titus	Barbados	June 2015	XXIX CCCAN	Bridgetown, Barbados	
200m backstroke	2:24.86		Diana Gómez	Dominican Republic	2 July 2019	XXXII CCCAN	Bridgetown, Barbados	
50m breaststroke	34.02		Emily Santos	Panama	2 July 2018	XXXI CCCAN	Savaneta, Aruba	
100m breaststroke	1:14.39		Emily Santos	Panama	3 July 2018	XXXI CCCAN	Savaneta, Aruba	
200m breaststroke	2:40.25		Emily Santos	Panama	30 June 2018	XXXI CCCAN	Savaneta, Aruba	
50m butterfly	28.74		Zaneta Alvaranga	Jamaica	30 June 2017	XXX CCCAN	Couva, Trinidad and Tobago	
100m butterfly	1:05.55	h	Elan Daley	Bermuda	29 June 2017	XXX CCCAN	Couva, Trinidad and Tobago	
200m butterfly	2:25.56		Valerie Gruest	Guatemala	27 June 2011	XXVII CCCAN	Mayagüez, Puerto Rico	
200m individual medley	2:27.38		Cerian Gibbes	Trinidad and Tobago	July 1995	XIX CCCAN	Guadalajara, Mexico	
4×100m freestyle relay	4:06.77		Alexandra Sartie (1:01.73); Daniela Flores (1:01.59); Michelle Gomez (1:03.00); Marisela Escobar (1:00.45)	Mexico	13 July 2022	XXXIV CCCAN	Bridgetown, Barbados	
4×100m medley relay	4:42.26		Fernanda González; Irina Chávez; Rita Medrano; Patricia Castañeda	Mexico	July 2003	XXIII CCCAN	Mexico City, Mexico	

Legend: # – Record awaiting ratification by CCCAN;
Records not set in finals: h – heat; r – relay 1st leg; rh – relay heat 1st leg; † – en route to final mark; tt – time trial

== Mixed relay (11-12) ==
Event	Time	Name	Nationality	Date	Meet	Location	Ref
4×50m freestyle relay	1:48.76	Yanni Blanco (26.99); Guillermo Doring (27.20); Daniela Flores (26.76); Alexandra Sartie (27.81)	Mexico	9 July 2022	XXXIV CCCAN	Bridgetown, Barbados	

Legend: # – Record awaiting ratification by CCCAN;
Records not set in finals: h – heat

== Boys (13-14) ==
Event	Time	Name	Nationality	Date	Meet	Location	Ref
50m freestyle	23.94	Lamar Taylor	Bahamas	3 July 2018	XXXI CCCAN	Savaneta, Aruba	
100m freestyle	52.20	Crox Acuña	Venezuela	August 2005	XXIV CCCAN	Santo Domingo, Dominican Republic	
200m freestyle	1:55.55	Dylan Carter	Trinidad and Tobago	27 June 2011	XXVII CCCAN	Mayagüez, Puerto Rico	
400m freestyle	4:05.20	Jorge Herrera	Puerto Rico	July 1987	XV CCCAN	Salinas, Puerto Rico	
800m freestyle	8:43.61	Gabriel Tortola	Venezuela	11 July 2022	XXXIV CCCAN	Bridgetown, Barbados	
1500m freestyle	16:21.97	Álvaro Ricón	Colombia	July 1997	XX CCCAN	Havana, Cuba	
50m backstroke	26.96	Timothy Wynter	Jamaica	29 June 2011	XXVII CCCAN	Mayagüez, Puerto Rico	
100m backstroke	58.70	Dylan Carter	Trinidad and Tobago	27 June 2011	XXVII CCCAN	Mayagüez, Puerto Rico	
200m backstroke	2:09.55	Timothy Wynter	Jamaica	1 July 2011	XXVII CCCAN	Mayagüez, Puerto Rico	
50m breaststroke	29.62	Diego Garcia	Mexico	19 August 2023	XXXV CCCAN	San Salvador, El Salvador	
100m breaststroke	1:04.53	Xavier Ruiz	Puerto Rico	24 June 2021	XXXIII CCCAN	San Juan, Puerto Rico	
200m breaststroke	2:18.97	Xavier Ruiz	Puerto Rico	25 June 2021	XXXIII CCCAN	San Juan, Puerto Rico	
50m butterfly	25.35	Dylan Carter	Trinidad and Tobago	2 July 2011	XXVII CCCAN	Mayagüez, Puerto Rico	
100m butterfly	56.16	Yohan García	Cuba	July 1997	XX CCCAN	Havana, Cuba	
200m butterfly	2:04.36	Juan Veloz	Mexico	July 1997	XX CCCAN	Havana, Cuba	
200m individual medley	2:09.83	Nicholas Bovell	Trinidad and Tobago	July 2001	XXII CCCAN	Dominican Republic	
400m individual medley	4:37.02	Xavier Ruiz	Puerto Rico	26 June 2021	XXXIII CCCAN	San Juan, Puerto Rico	
4×100m freestyle relay	3:38.19	Jose Reytor (52.02); Jack Lund (54.69); Santiago Vaquerizo; Franco Soria	Mexico	13 July 2022	XXXIV CCCAN	Bridgetown, Barbados	
4×200m freestyle relay	8:01.29	Samuel Guerra (2:03.43); Juan Sanchez (2:01.72); Dennis Perez (1:58.78); Gabriel Tortola (1:57.36)	Venezuela	12 July 2022	XXXIV CCCAN	Bridgetown, Barbados	
4×100m medley relay	3:58.22	Jack Lund (1:00.30); Abraham Mendez (1:07.81); Santiago Vaquerizo (58.12); Jose Eduard Solorzano (51.99)	Mexico	10 July 2022	XXXIV CCCAN	Bridgetown, Barbados	

Legend: # – Record awaiting ratification by CCCAN;
Records not set in finals: h – heat; r – relay 1st leg; rh – relay heat 1st leg; † – en route to final mark; tt – time trial

== Girls (13-14) ==
Event	Time		Name	Nationality	Date	Meet	Location	Ref
50m freestyle	26.48		Emily MacDonald	Jamaica	3 July 2018	XXXI CCCAN	Savaneta, Aruba	
100m freestyle	57.95		Emily MacDonald	Jamaica	2 July 2018	XXXI CCCAN	Savaneta, Aruba	
200m freestyle	2:00.49		Silvia Poll	Costa Rica	1985	XIV CCCAN	Oaxtepec, Mexico	
400m freestyle	4:25.15		Patricia Castañeda	Mexico	1985	XIV CCCAN	Oaxtepec, Mexico	
800m freestyle	9:00.11		Helena Moreno	Costa Rica	June 2015	XXIX CCCAN	Bridgetown, Barbados	
1500m freestyle	17:59.27		Valentina Mancera	Mexico	11 July 2022	XXXIV CCCAN	Bridgetown, Barbados	
50m backstroke	30.37		Gabriela Donahue	Trinidad and Tobago	29 June 2017	XXX CCCAN	Couva, Trinidad and Tobago	
100m backstroke	1:05.11		Celismar Guzman	Puerto Rico	June 2015	XXIX CCCAN	Bridgetown, Barbados	
200m backstroke	2:21.47		Lucero Mejia	Guatemala	13 July 2022	XXXIV CCCAN	Bridgetown, Barbados	
50m breaststroke	34.08	h	Isabella Berzal	Venezuela	13 July 2022	XXXIV CCCAN	Bridgetown, Barbados	
100m breaststroke	1:13.40		Emily Santos	Panama	2 July 2019	XXXII CCCAN	Bridgetown, Barbados	
200m breaststroke	2:42.42		Ana Maria Castellanos	Honduras	27 June 2011	XXVII CCCAN	Mayagüez, Puerto Rico	
50m butterfly	28.36		Beatriz Padron	Costa Rica	30 June 2017	XXX CCCAN	Couva, Trinidad and Tobago	
100m butterfly	1:03.33		Blanca Vazquez	Mexico	13 July 2022	XXXIV CCCAN	Bridgetown, Barbados	
200m butterfly	2:18.65		Daniela Alfaro	Costa Rica	1 July 2017	XXX CCCAN	Couva, Trinidad and Tobago	
200m individual medley	2:25.45		Lucero Mejia	Guatemala	10 July 2022	XXXIV CCCAN	Bridgetown, Barbados	
400m individual medley	5:07.75		Lucero Mejia	Guatemala	11 July 2022	XXXIV CCCAN	Bridgetown, Barbados	
4×100m freestyle relay	4:01.18		Anahi Schreuders (1:00.74); Elisabeth Timmer (1:00.75); Keeley Maduro (1:00.16); Florence Kock (59.53)	Aruba	25 June 2015	XXIX CCCAN	Bridgetown, Barbados	
4×200m freestyle relay	8:49.20		Giannitsa Garcia (2:13.28); Andrea Torres (2:11.31); Valentina Mancera (2:12.85); Blanca Vazquez (2:11.76)	Mexico	12 July 2022	XXXIV CCCAN	Bridgetown, Barbados	
4×100m medley relay	4:31.62		Carmen Rodrı́guez (1:10.16); Gretta Garcia; Aide Diaz; Giulia Ducourtil	Mexico	2 July 2019	XXXII CCCAN	Bridgetown, Barbados	

Legend: # – Record awaiting ratification by CCCAN;
Records not set in finals: h – heat; r – relay 1st leg; rh – relay heat 1st leg; † – en route to final mark; tt – time trial

== Mixed relay (13-14) ==
Event	Time	Name	Nationality	Date	Meet	Location	Ref
4×50m freestyle relay	1:44.91	Jose Reytor (24.13); Esteban Rubio (25.61); Blanca Vazquez (27.61); Andrea Gonzalez (27.56)	Mexico	9 July 2022	XXXIV CCCAN	Bridgetown, Barbados	

Legend: # – Record awaiting ratification by CCCAN;
Records not set in finals: h – heat

== Boys (15-17) ==
Event	Time		Name	Nationality	Date	Meet	Location	Ref
50m freestyle	22.98		Nikoli Blackman	Trinidad and Tobago	12 July 2022	XXXIV CCCAN	Bridgetown, Barbados	
100m freestyle	50.61		Nikoli Blackman	Trinidad and Tobago	11 July 2022	XXXIV CCCAN	Bridgetown, Barbados	
200m freestyle	1:51.90		Juan Morales	Colombia	1 July 2018	XXXI CCCAN	Savaneta, Aruba	
400m freestyle	3:58.53		Erwin Maldonado	Venezuela	July 2001	XXII CCCAN	Dominican Republic	
800m freestyle	8:23.74		Josean Massucco	Puerto Rico	11 July 2022	XXXIV CCCAN	Bridgetown, Barbados	
1500m freestyle	15:57.86		Cristian Quintero	Venezuela	30 June 2009	XXVI CCCAN	Barquisimeto, Venezuela	
50m backstroke	26.44		Max Wilson	U.S. Virgin Islands	25 June 2021	XXXIII CCCAN	San Juan, Puerto Rico	
100m backstroke	57.25	h	Max Wilson	U.S. Virgin Islands	12 July 2022	XXXIV CCCAN	Bridgetown, Barbados	
200m backstroke	2:03.49		Neisser Bent	Cuba	July 1993	XVIII CCCAN	Havana, Cuba	
50m breaststroke	28.55		Kito Campbell	Jamaica	27 June 2021	XXXIII CCCAN	San Juan, Puerto Rico	
100m breaststroke	1:03.72		Alexandre Grand'Pierre	Haiti	24 June 2021	XXXIII CCCAN	San Juan, Puerto Rico	
200m breaststroke	2:17.11		Mario González	Cuba	July 1993	XVIII CCCAN	Havana, Cuba	
50m butterfly	24.87		Emil Perez	Venezuela	10 July 2022	XXXIV CCCAN	Bridgetown, Barbados	
100m butterfly	55.25		Arsenio López	Puerto Rico	July 1997	XX CCCAN	Havana, Cuba	
200m butterfly	2:01.58		Shaune Fraser	Cayman Islands	August 2005	XXIV CCCAN	Santo Domingo, Dominican Republic	
200m individual medley	2:04.51		George Bovell	Trinidad and Tobago	July 2001	XXII CCCAN	Dominican Republic	
400m individual medley	4:29.38		Jarod Arroyo	Puerto Rico	30 June 2017	XXX CCCAN	Couva, Trinidad and Tobago	
4×100m freestyle relay	3:30.98		Alejandro Petruzzella; Glen Sochasckyj; Richard Farra; Cristian Quintero	Venezuela	2 July 2009	XXVI CCCAN	Barquisimeto, Venezuela	
4×200m freestyle relay	7:48.29		Andres Solivan; Jordan Portela; Miguel Cancel; Ricardo Miranda	Puerto Rico	June 2015	XXIX CCCAN	Bridgetown, Barbados	
4×100m medley relay	3:54.75		Jarod Arroyo (1:00.12); Daniel Chevere (1:06.71); Andrew Acosta (56.40); Jan Collazo (51.52)	Puerto Rico	2 July 2017	XXX CCCAN	Couva, Trinidad and Tobago	

Legend: # – Record awaiting ratification by CCCAN;
Records not set in finals: h – heat; r – relay 1st leg; rh – relay heat 1st leg; † – en route to final mark; tt – time trial

== Girls (15-17) ==
Event	Time		Name	Nationality	Date	Meet	Location	Ref
50m freestyle	25.97		Madelyn Moore	Bermuda	3 July 2018	XXXI CCCAN	Savaneta, Aruba	
100m freestyle	56.74		Leah Martindale	Barbados	July 1995	XIX CCCAN	Guadalajara, Mexico	
200m freestyle	2:02.12		Claudia Poll	Costa Rica	July 1989	XVI CCCAN	Caracas, Venezuela	
400m freestyle	4:15.06		Andreina Pinto	Venezuela	3 July 2009	XXVI CCCAN	Barquisimeto, Venezuela	
800m freestyle	8:40.30		Valerie Gruest	Guatemala	28 June 2017	XXX CCCAN	Couva, Trinidad and Tobago	
1500m freestyle	17:32.56		Belem Santaolaya	Mexico	11 July 2022	XXXIV CCCAN	Bridgetown, Barbados	
50m backstroke	30.23		Madelyn Moore	Bermuda	30 June 2018	XXXI CCCAN	Savaneta, Aruba	
100m backstroke	1:03.90		Miriam Sheehan	Puerto Rico	26 June 2021	XXXIII CCCAN	San Juan, Puerto Rico	
200m backstroke	2:18.05		Laura Melo	Colombia	3 July 2018	XXXI CCCAN	Savaneta, Aruba	
50m breaststroke	32.69	h	Emily Santos	Panama	13 July 2022	XXXIV CCCAN	Bridgetown, Barbados	
100m breaststroke	1:11.56		Emily Santos	Panama	10 July 2022	XXXIV CCCAN	Bridgetown, Barbados	
200m breaststroke	2:37.52		Emily Santos	Panama	11 July 2022	XXXIV CCCAN	Bridgetown, Barbados	
50m butterfly	27.57		Miriam Sheehan	Puerto Rico	24 June 2021	XXXIII CCCAN	San Juan, Puerto Rico	
100m butterfly	1:01.50		Elimar Barrios	Venezuela	2 July 2009	XXVI CCCAN	Barquisimeto, Venezuela	
200m butterfly	2:14.59		Valerie Gruest	Guatemala	1 July 2017	XXX CCCAN	Couva, Trinidad and Tobago	
200m individual medley	2:20.42		Valerie Gruest	Guatemala	1 July 2017	XXX CCCAN	Couva, Trinidad and Tobago	
400m individual medley	4:54.74		Valerie Gruest	Guatemala	29 June 2017	XXX CCCAN	Couva, Trinidad and Tobago	
4×100m freestyle relay	3:55.76		Celismar Guzman; Mayrangela Rodriguez; Liznel Ortiz; Julliana De Jesus	Puerto Rico	30 June 2017	XXX CCCAN	Couva, Trinidad and Tobago	
4×200m freestyle relay	8:37.03		Belem Santaolaya (2:05.82); Alejandra Hoyos (2:11.76); Tania Naranjo (2:13.79); Giulia Ducourtil (2:05.66)	Mexico	12 July 2022	XXXIV CCCAN	Bridgetown, Barbados	
4×100m medley relay	4:27.12		Liznel Ortiz (1:06.68); Marissa Lugo (1:16.04); Celismar Guzman (1:04.38); Julliana De Jesus (1:00.02)	Puerto Rico	2 July 2017	XXX CCCAN	Couva, Trinidad and Tobago	

Legend: # – Record awaiting ratification by CCCAN;
Records not set in finals: h – heat; r – relay 1st leg; rh – relay heat 1st leg; † – en route to final mark; tt – time trial

== Mixed relay (15-17) ==
Event	Time	Name	Nationality	Date	Meet	Location	Ref
4×50m freestyle relay	1:40.46	Jan Collazo (23.58); Celismar Guzman (26.59); Andrew Acosta (23.87); Liznel Ortiz (26.42)	Puerto Rico	29 June 2017	XXX CCCAN	Couva, Trinidad and Tobago	

Legend: # – Record awaiting ratification by CCCAN;
Records not set in finals: h – heat

== Boys (18 & Over) ==
Event	Time		Name	Nationality	Date	Meet	Location	Ref
50m freestyle	22.70		Renzo Tjon A Joe	Suriname	2 July 2019	XXXII CCCAN	Bridgetown, Barbados	
100m freestyle	49.53	h	Hanser García	Cuba	1 July 2009	XXVI CCCAN	Barquisimeto, Venezuela	
200m freestyle	1:47.55	r	Nikoli Blackman	Trinidad & Tobago	19 June 2024	XXXVI CCCAN	Monterrey, Mexico	
400m freestyle	3:55.54		Marcelo Acosta	El Salvador	2 July 2017	XXX CCCAN	Couva, Trinidad and Tobago	
800m freestyle	8:29.84		Emiliano Pina	Mexico	11 July 2022	XXXIV CCCAN	Bridgetown, Barbados	
1500m freestyle	15:39.51		Marcelo Acosta	El Salvador	28 June 2017	XXX CCCAN	Couva, Trinidad and Tobago	
50m backstroke	25.52		Yeziel Morales	Puerto Rico	25 June 2021	XXXIII CCCAN	San Juan, Puerto Rico	
100m backstroke	55.09		Yeziel Morales	Puerto Rico	26 June 2021	XXXIII CCCAN	San Juan, Puerto Rico	
200m backstroke	2:01.42		Yeziel Morales	Puerto Rico	13 July 2022	XXXIV CCCAN	Bridgetown, Barbados	
50m breaststroke	27.94		Édgar Crespo	Panama	1 July 2017	XXX CCCAN	Couva, Trinidad and Tobago	
100m breaststroke	1:02.02		Édgar Crespo	Panama	24 June 2021	XXXIII CCCAN	San Juan, Puerto Rico	
200m breaststroke	2:15.76		Bernhard Tyler Christianson	Panama	11 July 2022	XXXIV CCCAN	Bridgetown, Barbados	
50m butterfly	24.40		Joshua Romany	Trinidad and Tobago	30 June 2017	XXX CCCAN	Couva, Trinidad and Tobago	
100m butterfly	52.73		Dylan Carter	Trinidad and Tobago	29 June 2017	XXX CCCAN	Couva, Trinidad and Tobago	
200m butterfly	2:01.74		Victor Rosado	Puerto Rico	26 June 2021	XXXIII CCCAN	San Juan, Puerto Rico	
200m individual medley	2:00.61	h	Jarod Arroyo	Puerto Rico	24 June 2021	XXXIII CCCAN	San Juan, Puerto Rico	
400m individual medley	4:17.94		Jarod Arroyo	Puerto Rico	26 June 2021	XXXIII CCCAN	San Juan, Puerto Rico	
4×100m freestyle relay	3:29.47		Santiago Blanco (51.55); Jonas Casademunt (53.49); Antonio Romero (52.42); Carlos Kossio (52.01)	Mexico	13 July 2022	XXXIV CCCAN	Bridgetown, Barbados	
4×200m freestyle relay	7:42.00		G. Yañez; Jacobo Fraire; Ch. Iniestas; R. Morales	Mexico	July 1999	XXI CCCAN	Medellín, Colombia	
4×100m medley relay	3:49.93		Hernán Gonzalez (59.54); Édgar Crespo (1:05.27); Franco Reyes (54.25); Isaac Beitia (50.87)	Panama	2 July 2019	XXXII CCCAN	Bridgetown, Barbados	

Legend: # – Record awaiting ratification by CCCAN; WR – World record; AM – Americas record;
Records not set in finals: h – heat; r – relay 1st leg; rh – relay heat 1st leg; † – en route to final mark; tt – time trial

== Girls (18 & Over) ==
Event	Time		Name	Nationality	Date	Meet	Location	Ref
50m freestyle	25.32		Vanessa García	Puerto Rico	2 July 2011	XXVII CCCAN	Mayagüez, Puerto Rico	
100m freestyle	55.96		Vanessa García	Puerto Rico	28 June 2011	XXVII CCCAN	Mayagüez, Puerto Rico	
200m freestyle	2:02.57		Janelle Atkinson	Jamaica	July 2001	XXII CCCAN	Dominican Republic	
400m freestyle	4:13.11		Janelle Atkinson	Jamaica	July 2001	XXII CCCAN	Dominican Republic	
800m freestyle	8:39.16		Janelle Atkinson	Jamaica	July 2001	XXII CCCAN	Dominican Republic	
1500m freestyle	17:45.66		Daniela Hernandez	Mexico	11 July 2022	XXXIV CCCAN	Bridgetown, Barbados	
50m backstroke	29.68		Jesserick Pinto	Venezuela	29 June 2009	XXVI CCCAN	Barquisimeto, Venezuela	
100m backstroke	1:03.96		Gisela Morales	Guatemala	2 July 2013	XXVIII CCCAN	San José, Costa Rica	
200m backstroke	2:13.75		Kristen Romano	Puerto Rico	27 June 2021	XXXIII CCCAN	San Juan, Puerto Rico	
50m breaststroke	32.84		María Jiménez	Mexico	13 July 2022	XXXIV CCCAN	Bridgetown, Barbados	
100m breaststroke	1:10.76		María Jiménez	Mexico	10 July 2022	XXXIV CCCAN	Bridgetown, Barbados	
200m breaststroke	2:32.58		Adriana Marmolejo	Mexico	11 July 2022	XXXIV CCCAN	Bridgetown, Barbados	
50m butterfly	27.12		Madelyn Moore	Bermuda	24 June 2021	XXXIII CCCAN	San Juan, Puerto Rico	
100m butterfly	1:02.45		Daniela Gutiérrez	Colombia	30 June 2018	XXXI CCCAN	Savaneta, Aruba	
200m butterfly	2:17.32		Michell Ramirez	Honduras	26 June 2021	XXXIII CCCAN	San Juan, Puerto Rico	
200m individual medley	2:12.86		Kristen Romano	Puerto Rico	24 June 2021	XXXIII CCCAN	San Juan, Puerto Rico	
400m individual medley	4:49.41	tt	Kristen Romano	Puerto Rico	26 June 2021	XXXIII CCCAN	San Juan, Puerto Rico	
4×100m freestyle relay	3:57.43		Thammara Clemente (59.98); Patricia Casellas (59.80); Debra Rodriguez (59.04); Alana Berrocal (58.61)	Puerto Rico	30 June 2011	XXVII CCCAN	Mayagüez, Puerto Rico	
4×200m freestyle relay	8:39.00			Mexico	July 1999	XXI CCCAN	Medellín, Colombia	
4×100m medley relay	4:25.48		Alana Berrocal (1:06.57); Patricia Casellas (1:15.29); Debra Rodriguez (1:03.81); Thammara Clemente (59.81)	Puerto Rico	2 July 2011	XXVII CCCAN	Mayagüez, Puerto Rico	

Legend: # – Record awaiting ratification by CCCAN; WR – World record; AM – Americas record;
Records not set in finals: h – heat; r – relay 1st leg; rh – relay heat 1st leg; † – en route to final mark; tt – time trial

== Mixed relay (18 & Over) ==
Event	Time	Name	Nationality	Date	Meet	Location	Ref
4×50m freestyle relay	1:37.89	Louis Ortiz (22.73); Liznel Ortiz (26.30); Jan Collazo (22.90); Keyla Brown (25.96)	Puerto Rico	23 June 2021	XXXIII CCCAN	San Juan, Puerto Rico	

Legend: # – Record awaiting ratification by CCCAN;
Records not set in finals: h – heat
