= CAMEX =

International aquatics championships

CAMEX is an age-group aquatics championships featuring teams from Central America and Mexico. It is held biennially in even years and is organized by CCCAN.

The most recent edition of the event was held in Panama City between June 7–12, 2016.

== Members ==
- Costa Rica
- El Salvador
- Guatemala
- Honduras
- Mexico
- Nicaragua
- Panama

== Locations ==
Year	Edition	Host city	Country	Dates	Disciplines s=swimming; wp=water polo, ss=synchro, d=diving, ow=open water
1986	I	San Salvador	El Salvador		s, wp
1988	II	Acapulco	Mexico		s, wp, ss
1990	III	Tegucigalpa	Honduras		s, wp
1992	IV	Panama City	Panama		s, wp
1994	V	San José	Costa Rica		s, wp
1996	VI	Guatemala City	Guatemala		s, wp
1998	VII	San Salvador	El Salvador		s, wp
2000	VIII	San José	Costa Rica		s, wp, ss
2002	IX	Tegucigalpa & San Pedro Sula	Honduras		s, wp, ss
2004	X	Panama City	Panama		s, wp, ss
2006	XI	San Salvador	El Salvador		s, wp, ss, d, ow
2008	XII	San José	Costa Rica	9–14 June	s, wp, ss, d, ow
2010	XIII	Guatemala City	Guatemala	November	s, d
2012	XIV	San Salvador	El Salvador	25–30 May	s, d, wp, ss, ow
2014	XV	Panama City	Panama	6–15 April	s, d, wp, ss, ow
2016	XVI	Panama City	Panama	7–12 June	s, ow

== CAMEX swimming records ==
All records were set in finals unless noted otherwise. All times are swum in a long-course (50m) pool.

=== Boys (11-12) ===
Event	Time	Name	Nationality	Date	Meet	Location	Ref
50m freestyle	26.23	Joshua Stoute	Panama	6 April 2014	2014 CAMEX	Panama City, Panama	
100m freestyle	57.37	Joshua Stoute	Panama	10 April 2014	2014 CAMEX	Panama City, Panama	
200 m freestyle							
400 m freestyle							
50m backstroke	30.54	Joshua Stoute	Panama	8 April 2014	2014 CAMEX	Panama City, Panama	
100 m backstroke							
200 m backstroke							
50m breaststroke	33.39	Joshua Stoute	Panama	9 April 2014	2014 CAMEX	Panama City, Panama	
100m breaststroke							
200m breaststroke							
50m butterfly	28.44	Joshua Stoute	Panama	10 April 2014	2014 CAMEX	Panama City, Panama	
100m butterfly	1:01.80	Joshua Stoute	Panama	8 April 2014	2014 CAMEX	Panama City, Panama	
200 m butterfly							
200m individual medley	2:22.45	Joshua Stoute	Panama	9 April 2014	2014 CAMEX	Panama City, Panama	
400m individual medley							
4 × 100 m freestyle relay							
4 × 200 m freestyle relay	8:59.23	Sebastián Arroyo; Tobias Badilla; Andrés Bustos; Ignacio Retana	Costa Rica	7 June 2016	2016 CAMEX	Panama City, Panama	
4 × 100 m medley relay							

Legend: # – Record awaiting ratification by CCCAN;
Records not set in finals: h – heat; sf – semifinal; r – relay 1st leg; rh – relay heat 1st leg; b – B final; † – en route to final mark; tt – time trial

=== Girls (11-12) ===
Event	Time	Name	Club	Date	Meet	Location	Ref
50 m freestyle							
100 m freestyle							
200 m freestyle							
400 m freestyle							
50 m backstroke							
100m backstroke	1:09.31	Ireyra Tamayo	Panama	6 April 2014	2014 CAMEX	Panama City, Panama	
200 m backstroke							
50 m breaststroke							
100 m breaststroke							
200 m breaststroke							
50m butterfly	30.07	Beatriz Padrón	Costa Rica	7 June 2016	2016 CAMEX	Panama City, Panama	
100m butterfly							
200 m butterfly							
200 m individual medley							
400 m individual medley							
4 × 100 m freestyle relay							
4 × 200 m freestyle relay	9:25.03	Helena Moreno; Nicole Rodríguez; Fabiola Sanco; Amanda Alfaro	Costa Rica	9 April 2014	2014 CAMEX	Panama City, Panama	
4 × 100 m medley relay							

Legend: # – Record awaiting ratification by CCCAN;
Records not set in finals: h – heat; sf – semifinal; r – relay 1st leg; rh – relay heat 1st leg; b – B final; † – en route to final mark; tt – time trial

=== Mixed relay ===
Event	Time	Name	Nationality	Date	Meet	Location	Ref
4 × 50 m freestyle relay	1:53.72	Beatriz Padrón; Elena Fornoni; Ignacio Retana; André Bustos	Costa Rica	7 June 2016	2016 CAMEX	Panama City, Panama	

Legend: # – Record awaiting ratification by CCCAN;
Records not set in finals: h – heat; sf – semifinal; r – relay 1st leg; rh – relay heat 1st leg; b – B final; † – en route to final mark; tt – time trial

=== Boys (13-14) ===
Event	Time	Name	Nationality	Date	Meet	Location	Ref
50m freestyle							
100m freestyle	54.38	Marcelo Valverde	Costa Rica	9 June 2016	2016 CAMEX	Panama City, Panama	
200m freestyle							
400m freestyle							
50m backstroke	29.22	Andres Lares	Panama	8 April 2014	2014 CAMEX	Panama City, Panama	
100m backstroke	1:03.01	Andres Lares	Panama	6 April 2014	2014 CAMEX	Panama City, Panama	
200m backstroke	2:16.55	Erick Gordillo	Guatemala	9 April 2014	2014 CAMEX	Panama City, Panama	
50m breaststroke	30.85	José Solís	Costa Rica	9 June 2016	2016 CAMEX	Panama City, Panama	
100m breaststroke	1:06.87	José Solís	Costa Rica	June 2016	2016 CAMEX	Panama City, Panama	
200m breaststroke	2:22.57	José Solís	Costa Rica	7 June 2016	2016 CAMEX	Panama City, Panama	
50m butterfly	26.02	Bryan Álvarez	Costa Rica	10 April 2014	2014 CAMEX	Panama City, Panama	
100m butterfly							
200m butterfly							
200m individual medley							
400m individual medley	4:41.01	José Solís	Costa Rica	8 June 2016	2016 CAMEX	Panama City, Panama	
4 × 100 m freestyle relay							
4 × 200 m freestyle relay	8:26.73	Dereck Morales; Juan Ignacio González; Bryan Álvarez; Daniel Espinoza	Costa Rica	8 April 2014	2014 CAMEX	Panama City, Panama	
4 × 100 m medley relay							

Legend: # – Record awaiting ratification by CCCAN;
Records not set in finals: h – heat; sf – semifinal; r – relay 1st leg; rh – relay heat 1st leg; b – B final; † – en route to final mark; tt – time trial

=== Girls (13-14) ===
Event	Time		Name	Club	Date	Meet	Location	Ref
50 m freestyle								
100m freestyle	58.51		Helena Moreno	Costa Rica	9 June 2016	2016 CAMEX	Panama City, Panama	
200m freestyle	2:04.95		Helena Moreno	Costa Rica	8 June 2016	2016 CAMEX	Panama City, Panama	
400m freestyle	4:20.67		Helena Moreno	Costa Rica	June 2016	2016 CAMEX	Panama City, Panama	
800m freestyle	8:58.00		Helena Moreno	Costa Rica	7 June 2016	2016 CAMEX	Panama City, Panama	
50 m backstroke								
100m backstroke	1:06.32		Celina Márquez	El Salvador	6 April 2014	2014 CAMEX	Panama City, Panama	
200m backstroke	2:22.50		Celina Márquez	El Salvador	9 April 2014	2014 CAMEX	Panama City, Panama	
50m breaststroke	35.49	h	Jasmine Nocentini	Panama	9 June 2016	2016 CAMEX	Panama City, Panama	
50m breaststroke	35.49		Jasmine Nocentini	Panama	9 June 2016	2016 CAMEX	Panama City, Panama	
100m breaststroke	1:17.78		Elisa Funes	El Salvador	10 June 2016	2016 CAMEX	Panama City, Panama	
200 m breaststroke								
50m butterfly	28.72		Celina Márquez	El Salvador	10 April 2014	2014 CAMEX	Panama City, Panama	
100m butterfly	1:04.05		Valerie Gruest	Guatemala	7 April 2014	2014 CAMEX	Panama City, Panama	
200m butterfly	2:19.19		Valerie Gruest	Guatemala	8 April 2014	2014 CAMEX	Panama City, Panama	
200 m individual medley								
400 m individual medley								
4 × 100 m freestyle relay	4:07.67		Jasmine Nocentini; Sofia Maher; Larissa Bueno; Ireyra Tamayo	Panama	8 June 2016	2016 CAMEX	Panama City, Panama	
4 × 200 m freestyle relay	8:57.73		Isabella Ubilla; Jimena Pérez; Amanda Alfaro; Helena Moreno	Costa Rica	9 June 2016	2016 CAMEX	Panama City, Panama	
4 × 100 m medley relay	4:38.26		Larissa Bueno; Jasmine Nocentini; Ireyra Tamayo; Sofia Maher	Panama	June 2016	2016 CAMEX	Panama City, Panama	

Legend: # – Record awaiting ratification by CCCAN;
Records not set in finals: h – heat; sf – semifinal; r – relay 1st leg; rh – relay heat 1st leg; b – B final; † – en route to final mark; tt – time trial

=== Mixed relay ===
Event	Time	Name	Nationality	Date	Meet	Location	Ref
4 × 50 m freestyle relay	1:47.11	Helena Moreno; Amanda Alfaro; Marcelo Valverde; Sebastián Sánchez	Costa Rica	7 June 2016	2016 CAMEX	Panama City, Panama	

Legend: # – Record awaiting ratification by CCCAN;
Records not set in finals: h – heat; sf – semifinal; r – relay 1st leg; rh – relay heat 1st leg; b – B final; † – en route to final mark; tt – time trial

=== Boys (15-17) ===
Event	Time	Name	Nationality	Date	Meet	Location	Ref
50m freestyle	23.93	Manuel González	Panama	8 April 2014	2014 CAMEX	Panama City, Panama	
100m freestyle							
200m freestyle							
400m freestyle							
1500m freestyle	16:08.00	Marcelo Acosta	El Salvador	April 2014	2014 CAMEX	Panama City, Panama	
50m backstroke	27.88	Harrison Olle	Panama	8 April 2014	2014 CAMEX	Panama City, Panama	
100m backstroke	59.84	Erick Gordillo	Guatemala	8 June 2016	2016 CAMEX	Panama City, Panama	
200m backstroke	2:09.07	Erick Gordillo	Guatemala	June 2016	2016 CAMEX	Panama City, Panama	
50m breaststroke							
100m breaststroke	1:06.30	Jesus Flores	Honduras	6 April 2014	2014 CAMEX	Panama City, Panama	
200m breaststroke	2:25.66	Jesus Flores	Honduras	7 April 2014	2014 CAMEX	Panama City, Panama	
50m butterfly	25.16	Franco Reyes	Panama	10 April 2014	2014 CAMEX	Panama City, Panama	
100m butterfly	55.87	Franco Reyes	Panama	7 June 2016	2016 CAMEX	Panama City, Panama	
200m butterfly							
200m individual medley							
400m individual medley	4:36.24	Erick Gordillo	Guatemala	8 June 2016	2016 CAMEX	Panama City, Panama	
4 × 100 m freestyle relay	3:36.16	Jeancarlo Calderon; Andres Lares; Hernán Gonzalez; Franco Reyes	Panama	8 June 2016	2016 CAMEX	Panama City, Panama	
4 × 200 m freestyle relay	8:05.09	Arnoldo Herrera; Antonio González; Francisco Montero; Esteban Araya	Costa Rica	8 April 2014	2014 CAMEX	Panama City, Panama	
4 × 100 m medley relay	4:02.21	Hernán Gonzalez; Daniel Villegas; Franco Reyes; Jeancarlo Calderon	Panama	June 2016	2016 CAMEX	Panama City, Panama	

Legend: # – Record awaiting ratification by CCCAN;
Records not set in finals: h – heat; sf – semifinal; r – relay 1st leg; rh – relay heat 1st leg; b – B final; † – en route to final mark; tt – time trial

=== Girls (15-17) ===
Event	Time	Name	Nationality	Date	Meet	Location	Ref
50m freestyle							
100m freestyle							
200m freestyle							
400m freestyle	4:15.96	Valerie Gruest	Guatemala	June 2016	2016 CAMEX	Panama City, Panama	
50m backstroke	30.14	Celina Márquez	El Salvador	7 June 2016	2016 CAMEX	Panama City, Panama	
100m backstroke	1:06.44	Celina Márquez	El Salvador	8 June 2016	2016 CAMEX	Panama City, Panama	
200m backstroke	2:20.94	Celina Márquez	El Salvador	June 2016	2016 CAMEX	Panama City, Panama	
50m breaststroke	34.03	Wendy Sanchez	Panama	9 June 2016	2016 CAMEX	Panama City, Panama	
100m breaststroke							
200m breaststroke							
50m butterfly	28.96	Celina Márquez	El Salvador	8 June 2016	2016 CAMEX	Panama City, Panama	
100m butterfly	1:02.05	Valerie Gruest	Guatemala	7 June 2016	2016 CAMEX	Panama City, Panama	
200m butterfly	2:13.90	Valerie Gruest	Guatemala	9 June 2016	2016 CAMEX	Panama City, Panama	
200m individual medley							
400m individual medley	4:57.30	Valerie Gruest	Guatemala	8 June 2016	2016 CAMEX	Panama City, Panama	
4 × 100 m freestyle relay	4:05.52	Stefanie Mendizabal; Valeria Cerón; Alicia Mancilla; Valerie Gruest	Guatemala	8 June 2016	2016 CAMEX	Panama City, Panama	
4 × 200 m freestyle relay	8:51.47	Stefanie Mendizabal; Valeria Cerón; Alicia Mancilla; Valerie Gruest	Guatemala	9 June 2016	2016 CAMEX	Panama City, Panama	
4 × 100 m medley relay	4:33.07	Valerie Gruest; Daniela Artiga; Alicia Mancilla; Stefanie Mendizabal	Guatemala	June 2016	2016 CAMEX	Panama City, Panama	

Legend: # – Record awaiting ratification by CCCAN;
Records not set in finals: h – heat; sf – semifinal; r – relay 1st leg; rh – relay heat 1st leg; b – B final; † – en route to final mark; tt – time trial

=== Mixed relay ===
Event	Time	Name	Nationality	Date	Meet	Location	Ref
4 × 50 m freestyle relay	1:45.29	George Jabbour; Marco Flores; Sara Pastrana; Caroll Martinez	Honduras	7 June 2016	2016 CAMEX	Panama City, Panama	

Legend: # – Record awaiting ratification by CCCAN;
Records not set in finals: h – heat; sf – semifinal; r – relay 1st leg; rh – relay heat 1st leg; b – B final; † – en route to final mark; tt – time trial

=== Boys (18 & Over) ===
Event	Time	Name	Nationality	Date	Meet	Location	Ref
50m freestyle							
100m freestyle	52.16	Mario Montoya	Costa Rica	10 April 2014	2014 CAMEX	Panama City, Panama	
200m freestyle							
400m freestyle	4:03.32	Mario Montoya	Costa Rica	9 April 2014	2014 CAMEX	Panama City, Panama	
50m backstroke	27.60	Eisner Barbarena	Nicaragua	7 June 2016	2016 CAMEX	Panama City, Panama	
100m backstroke	59.70	Eisner Barbarena	Nicaragua	8 June 2016	2016 CAMEX	Panama City, Panama	
200m backstroke	2:11.68	Eisner Barbarena	Nicaragua	June 2016	2016 CAMEX	Panama City, Panama	
50m breaststroke	27.98	Edgar Crespo	Panama	9 April 2014	2014 CAMEX	Panama City, Panama	
100m breaststroke	1:02.58	Edgar Crespo	Panama	June 2016	2016 CAMEX	Panama City, Panama	
200m breaststroke	2:21.34	Arnoldo Herrera	Costa Rica	7 June 2016	2016 CAMEX	Panama City, Panama	
50m butterfly	24.51	Luis Martinez	Guatemala	10 April 2014	2014 CAMEX	Panama City, Panama	
100m butterfly	53.71	Luis Martinez	Guatemala	7 April 2014	2014 CAMEX	Panama City, Panama	
200m butterfly							
200m individual medley							
400m individual medley	4:38.62	Esteban Araya	Costa Rica	8 June 2016	2016 CAMEX	Panama City, Panama	
4 × 100 m freestyle relay	3:34.27	Ricardo Yee; Ahmed Wynter; Ismael Ortiz; Isaac Beitia	Panama	10 April 2014	2014 CAMEX	Panama City, Panama	
4 × 200 m freestyle relay	7:56.02	Kevin Avila; Gary Pineda; Kevin Vasquez; Luis Martinez	Guatemala	8 April 2014	2014 CAMEX	Panama City, Panama	
4 × 100 m medley relay	3:55.39	Xavier Gallardo; Édgar Crespo; Ahmed Wynter; Isaac Beitia	Panama	9 April 2014	2014 CAMEX	Panama City, Panama	

Legend: # – Record awaiting ratification by CCCAN;
Records not set in finals: h – heat; sf – semifinal; r – relay 1st leg; rh – relay heat 1st leg; b – B final; † – en route to final mark; tt – time trial

=== Girls (18 & Over) ===
Event	Time	Name	Nationality	Date	Meet	Location	Ref
50m freestyle							
100m freestyle							
200m freestyle							
400m freestyle							
50m backstroke							
100m backstroke							
200m backstroke	2:24.90	Mariangel Hidalgo	Costa Rica	9 April 2014	2014 CAMEX	Panama City, Panama	
50m breaststroke	34.44	Adriana Morera	Costa Rica	9 June 2016	2016 CAMEX	Panama City, Panama	
100m breaststroke	1:15.77	Adriana Morera	Costa Rica	9 June 2016	2016 CAMEX	Panama City, Panama	
200m breaststroke							
50m butterfly	29.14	Dalia Torrez	Nicaragua	10 April 2014	2014 CAMEX	Panama City, Panama	
100m butterfly							
200m butterfly							
200m individual medley							
400m individual medley							
4 × 100 m freestyle relay							
4 × 200 m freestyle relay							
4 × 100 m medley relay							

Legend: # – Record awaiting ratification by CCCAN;
Records not set in finals: h – heat; sf – semifinal; r – relay 1st leg; rh – relay heat 1st leg; b – B final; † – en route to final mark; tt – time trial

=== Mixed relay ===
Event	Time	Name	Nationality	Date	Meet	Location	Ref
4 × 50 m freestyle relay	1:45.34	Miguel Mena; Dalia Tórrez; Eisner Barberena; Germania Jarquin	Nicaragua	7 June 2016	2016 CAMEX	Panama City, Panama	

Legend: # – Record awaiting ratification by CCCAN;
Records not set in finals: h – heat; sf – semifinal; r – relay 1st leg; rh – relay heat 1st leg; b – B final; † – en route to final mark; tt – time trial
