= List of Central American Games records in swimming =

This is a listing of fastest swimming times achieved at the Central American Games. These records are maintained by ORDECA, the Central American Sports Organization. All times are swum in a long-course (50m) pool. All records were set in finals unless noted otherwise.

== Men ==
Event	Time	Name	Club	Date	Meet	Location	Ref
50m freestyle	23.46	Kevin Ávila	Guatemala	7 December 2017	2017 Games	Managua, Nicaragua	
100m freestyle	51.11	Luis Martinez	Guatemala	4 December 2017	2017 Games	Managua, Nicaragua	
200m freestyle	1:52.62	Mario Montoya	Costa Rica	17 March 2013	2013 Games	San José, Costa Rica	
400m freestyle	3:56.49	Marcelo Acosta	El Salvador	8 December 2017	2017 Games	Managua, Nicaragua	
800m freestyle	8:13.50	Marcelo Acosta	El Salvador	6 December 2017	2017 Games	Managua, Nicaragua	
1500m freestyle	15:44.04	Marcelo Acosta	El Salvador	4 December 2017	2017 Games	Managua, Nicaragua	
50m backstroke	26.67	Luis Martinez	Guatemala	8 December 2017	2017 Games	Managua, Nicaragua	
100m backstroke	57.88	Erick Gordillo	Guatemala	4 December 2017	2017 Games	Managua, Nicaragua	
200m backstroke	2:06.46	Erick Gordillo	Guatemala	6 December 2017	2017 Games	Managua, Nicaragua	
50m breaststroke	27.72	Édgar Crespo	Panama	5 December 2017	2017 Games	Managua, Nicaragua	
100m breaststroke	1:02.32	Edgar Crespo	Panama	7 December 2017	2017 Games	Managua, Nicaragua	
200m breaststroke	2:18.47	Edgar Crespo	Panama	15 March 2013	2013 Games	Managua, Nicaragua	
50m butterfly	23.89	Luis Martinez	Guatemala	8 December 2017	2017 Games	Managua, Nicaragua	
100m butterfly	52.47	Luis Martinez	Guatemala	6 December 2017	2017 Games	Managua, Nicaragua	
200m butterfly	2:01.34	Luis Martinez	Guatemala	4 December 2017	2017 Games	Managua, Nicaragua	
200m individual medley	2:08.35	Erick Gordillo	Guatemala	8 December 2017	2017 Games	Managua, Nicaragua	
400m individual medley	4:27.29	Erick Gordillo	Guatemala	5 December 2017	2017 Games	Managua, Nicaragua	
4 × 100 m freestyle relay	3:29.41	Isaac Beitia; Hernán Gonzalez; Johamed Lowe; Jean Carlo Calderón	Panama	7 December 2017	2017 Games	Managua, Nicaragua	
4 × 200 m freestyle relay	7:46.74	Kevin Ávila; Erick Gordillo; Emilio Ávila; Luis Martínez	Guatemala	5 December 2017	2017 Games	Managua, Nicaragua	
4 × 100 m medley relay	3:51.69	Hernán Gonzalez; Édgar Crespo; Jean Carlo Calderon; Isaac Beitia	Panama	9 December 2017	2017 Games	Managua, Nicaragua	

Legend: # – Record awaiting ratification by ORDECA; WR – World record; AM – Americas record;
Records not set in finals: h – heat; sf – semifinal; r – relay 1st leg; rh – relay heat 1st leg; b – B final; † – en route to final mark; tt – time trial

== Women ==
Event	Time	Name	Club	Date	Meet	Location	Ref
50m freestyle	26.80	Eileen Coparropa	Panama	1997	1997 Games	Tegucigalpa, Honduras	
100m freestyle	57.72	Gabriela Santis	Guatemala	5 December 2017	2017 Games	Managua, Nicaragua	
200m freestyle	2:03.70	Helena Moreno	Costa Rica	7 December 2017	2017 Games	Managua, Nicaragua	
400m freestyle	4:18.89	Helena Moreno	Costa Rica	4 December 2017	2017 Games	Managua, Nicaragua	
800m freestyle	8:54.63	Helena Moreno	Costa Rica	8 December 2017	2017 Games	Managua, Nicaragua	
1500m freestyle	17:08.15	Helena Moreno	Costa Rica	6 December 2017	2017 Games	Managua, Nicaragua	
50m backstroke	29.60	Gisela Morales	Guatemala	5 December 2017	2017 Games	Managua, Nicaragua	
100m backstroke	1:03.45	Gisela Morales	Guatemala	7 December 2017	2017 Games	Managua, Nicaragua	
200m backstroke	2:14.38	Jamie Reid	Panama	5 March 2006	2006 Games	Managua, Nicaragua	
50m breaststroke	34.28	Alexa Mora	Costa Rica	9 December 2017	2017 Games	Managua, Nicaragua	
100m breaststroke	1:15.98	Adriana Morera	Costa Rica	6 December 2017	2017 Games	Managua, Nicaragua	
200m breaststroke	2:41.99	Daniela Artiga	Guatemala	4 December 2017	2017 Games	Managua, Nicaragua	
50m butterfly	28.02	Beatriz Padrón	Costa Rica	5 December 2017	2017 Games	Managua, Nicaragua	
100m butterfly	1:02.62	Marie Meza	Costa Rica	7 December 2017	2017 Games	Managua, Nicaragua	
200m butterfly	2:18.84	Daniela Alfaro	Costa Rica	9 December 2017	2017 Games	Managua, Nicaragua	
200m individual medley	2:24.36	Julimar Ávila	Honduras	13 March 2013	2013 Games	San José, Costa Rica	
400m individual medley	5:09.00	Ana Castellanos	Honduras	16 March 2013	2013 Games	San José, Costa Rica	
4 × 100 m freestyle relay	3:57.38	Daniela Alfaro; Marie Meza; Beatriz Padrón; Helena Moreno	Costa Rica	8 December 2017	2017 Games	Managua, Nicaragua	
4 × 200 m freestyle relay	8:35.83	Sara Pastrana; Julimar Ávila; Michelle Ramirez; Gabriela Paredes	Honduras	4 December 2017	2017 Games	Managua, Nicaragua	
4 × 100 m medley relay	4:23.54	Gisela Morales; Daniela Artiga; Alicia Mancilla; Gabriela Santis	Guatemala	6 December 2017	2017 Games	Managua, Nicaragua	

Legend: # – Record awaiting ratification by ORDECA; WR – World record; AM – Americas record;
Records not set in finals: h – heat; sf – semifinal; r – relay 1st leg; rh – relay heat 1st leg; b – B final; † – en route to final mark; tt – time trial
