= List of Panamanian records in swimming =

The Panamanian records in swimming are the fastest ever performances of swimmers from Panama, which are recognised and ratified by the Federación Panameña de Natación (FPN).

All records were set in finals unless noted otherwise.

== Long Course (50 m) ==
=== Men ===
Event	Time		Name	Club	Date	Meet	Location	Ref
50 m freestyle	23.13	b	Jeancarlo Calderon	Panama	29 June 2023	CAC Games	San Salvador, El Salvador	
50 m freestyle	23.08	'#'	Julio Cesar Rodriguez Rosales	Panama	14 March 2025	3rd Evaluativa Nacional	Panama	
100 m freestyle	50.66	h	Isaac Beitia	Panama	24 July 2019	World Championships	Gwangju, South Korea	
200 m freestyle	1:54.58	h	José Isaza Chu	Panama	20 July 1996	Olympic Games	Atlanta, United States	
400 m freestyle	4:09.13		Tyler Christianson	Naval Academy Aquatic Club	16 June 2019	Virginia PSDN Spring Luau	Stafford, United States	
800 m freestyle	8:39.98	†	Andres Lares de Beldagan	Panama	28 June 2017	CCCAN Championships	Couva, Trinidad and Tobago	
1500 m freestyle	16:31.79		Andres Lares de Beldagan	Panama	28 June 2017	CCCAN Championships	Couva, Trinidad and Tobago	
50 m backstroke	26.98		Hernan Gonzalez	Panama	27 April 2019	Puerto Rico Open	San Juan, Puerto Rico	
100 m backstroke	58.65		Hernan Gonzalez	Panama	28 April 2019	Puerto Rico Open	San Juan, Puerto Rico	
200 m backstroke	2:08.75		Tyler Christianson	Naval Academy Aquatic Club	15 June 2019	Virginia PSDN Spring Luau	Stafford, United States	
50 m breaststroke	27.49		Édgar Crespo	Panama	6 November 2015	World Cup	Dubai, United Arab Emirates	
100 m breaststroke	1:01.20		Édgar Crespo	Panama	12 March 2013	Central American Championships	San José, Costa Rica	
200 m breaststroke	2:13.41	h	Tyler Christianson	Panama	27 July 2021	Olympic Games	Tokyo, Japan	
50 m butterfly	24.60	h	Franco Reyes	Panama	2 August 2015	World Championships	Kazan, Russia	
100 m butterfly	54.49	h	Franco Reyes	Panama	7 August 2015	World Championships	Kazan, Russia	
200 m butterfly	2:00.80	h	Diego Castillo	Panama	26 July 2011	World Championships	Shanghai, China	
200 m individual medley	2:02.70	h	Tyler Christianson	Panama	28 July 2021	Olympic Games	Tokyo, Japan	
400 m individual medley	4:25.93	b	Tyler Christianson	Panama	3 August 2019	Pan American Games	Lima, Peru	
4×100m freestyle relay	3:27.86	tt	Julio Cesar Rodriguez Rosales	Panama	20 June 2024	CCCAN Championships	Monterrey, Mexico	
4×200m freestyle relay	7:50.69		Isaac Beitia; Jean Carlo Calderón; Ricardo Jose Torres; Hernán Gonzalez	Panama	5 December 2017	Central American Games	Managua, Nicaragua	
4×100m medley relay	3:49.93		Hernán Gonzalez (59.54); Édgar Crespo (1:05.27); Franco Reyes (54.25); Isaac Beitia (50.87)	Panama	2 July 2019	CCCAN Championships	Bridgetown, Barbados	

Legend: # – Record awaiting ratification by FPN; WR – World record; AM – Americas record; e – equalled existing record;
Records not set in finals: h – heat; sf – semifinal; r – relay 1st leg; rh – relay heat 1st leg; b – B final; † – en route to final mark; so – swim-off; tt – time trial

=== Women ===
Event	Time		Name	Club	Date	Meet	Location	Ref
50m freestyle	25.37	sf	Eileen Coparropa	Panama	20 August 2004	Olympic Games	Athens, Greece	
100m freestyle	55.98	h	Eileen Coparropa	Panama	12 August 2003	Pan American Games	Santo Domingo, Dominican Republic	
200m freestyle	2:08.40		Ireyra Tamayo	Panama	29 June 2017	CCCAN	Couva, Trinidad and Tobago	
400m freestyle	4:32.77		María Far Núñez	Panama	6 April 2014	CAMEX	Panama City, Panama	
800m freestyle								
1500m freestyle								
50m backstroke	30.00	b	Carolina Cermelli	De Dolfijn	7 April 2023	Eindhoven Qualification Meet	Eindhoven, Netherlands	
100m backstroke	1:03.92	b	Carolina Cermelli	De Dolfijn	8 April 2023	Eindhoven Qualification Meet	Eindhoven, Netherlands	
200m backstroke	2:18.50	h	Carolina Cermelli	Panama	28 July 2023	World Championships	Fukuoka, Japan	
50m breaststroke	31.81		Emily Santos	Panama	29 July 2026	CAC Games	Santo Domingo, Dominican Republic	
100m breaststroke	1:08.44		Emily Santos	Panama	10 August 2025	Junior Pan American Games	Asunción, Paraguay	
200m breaststroke	2:29.19		Emily Santos	Panama	31 July 2026	CAC Games	Santo Domingo, Dominican Republic	
50m butterfly	28.58		Maria Castillo	Panama	23 April 2024	Segunda Evaluativa Clasificatoria	Panama City, Panama	
100m butterfly	1:04.48	h	Ireyra Tamayo	Panama	28 June 2017	CCCAN	Couva, Trinidad and Tobago	
200m butterfly	2:18.27		María Far Núñez	Panama	8 April 2014	CAMEX	Panama City, Panama	
200m individual medley	2:25.38		María Far Núñez	Panama	6 April 2014	CAMEX	Panama City, Panama	
400m individual medley	5:04.28		María Far Núñez	Panama	8 March 2014	South American Games	Santiago, Chile	
4×100m freestyle relay	4:01.50		Ireyra Tamayo; Larissa Bueno; Marialuisa Avila; Cathy Cooper	Panama	29 June 2017	CCCAN	Couva, Trinidad and Tobago	
4×200m freestyle relay	9:00.94		Cathy Cooper; Marialuisa Avila; Carolina Cermelli; Ireyra Tamayo	Panama	1 July 2017	CCCAN	Couva, Trinidad and Tobago	
4×100m medley relay	4:22.55		Carolina Cermelli (1:05.62); Emily Santos (1:10.54); Maria Castillo (1:05.82); Melissa Murua (1:00.57)	Panama	29 June 2023	CAC Games	San Salvador, El Salvador	

Legend: # – Record awaiting ratification by FPN; WR – World record; AM – Americas record; e – equalled existing record;
Records not set in finals: h – heat; sf – semifinal; r – relay 1st leg; rh – relay heat 1st leg; b – B final; † – en route to final mark; so – swim-off; tt – time trial

=== Mixed relay ===
Event	Time	Name	Nationality	Date	Meet	Location	Ref
4×50m freestyle relay	1:40.84	Isaac Beitia; Sara Chi; Cathy Cooper; Franco Reyes	Panama	29 June 2018	CCCAN	San Salvador, El Salvador	
4×100m freestyle relay	3:43.59	Jeancarlo Calderon (52.91); Catharine Cooper (58.75); Ireyra Tamayo (1:00.45); Isaac Beitia (51.48)	Panama	23 July 2018	CAC Games	Barranquilla, Colombia	
4×50m medley relay							
4×100m medley relay	4:03.01	Carolina Cermelli (1:06.12); Bernhard Christianson (1:02.43); Jeancarlo Calderon (55.57); Maria Castillo (58.89)	Panama	24 June 2023	CAC Games	San Salvador, El Salvador	

Legend: # – Record awaiting ratification by FPN; e – equalled existing record;
Records not set in finals: h – heat; so – swim-off

== Short Course (25 m) ==
=== Men ===
Event	Time		Name	Club	Date	Meet	Location	Ref
50m freestyle	23.08	rh	Isaac Beitia	Panama	12 December 2018	World Championships	Hangzhou, China	
100m freestyle	50.03	h	Isaac Beitia	Panama	15 December 2018	World Championships	Hangzhou, China	
200m freestyle	1:53.16	h	Isaac Beitia	Panama	3 December 2014	World Championships	Doha, Qatar	
400m freestyle								
800m freestyle								
1500m freestyle								
50m backstroke	26.62	rh	Hernan Mauricio Medina Gonzalez	Panama	8 December 2016	World Championships	Windsor, Canada	
100m backstroke	57.68	h	Hernan Mauricio Medina Gonzalez	Panama	6 December 2016	World Championships	Windsor, Canada	
200m backstroke								
50m breaststroke	27.27	h	Édgar Crespo	Panama	15 December 2018	World Championships	Hangzhou, China	
100m breaststroke	59.40	h	Édgar Crespo	Panama	11 December 2018	World Championships	Hangzhou, China	
200m breaststroke	2:12.63	h	Édgar Crespo	Panama	17 December 2010	World Championships	Dubai, United Arab Emirates	
50m butterfly	25.39	h	Édgar Crespo	Panama	17 December 2010	World Championships	Dubai, United Arab Emirates	
100m butterfly	56.60		Édgar Crespo	Panama	14 October 2016	Plzenske Sprinty	Plzeň, Czech Republic	
200m butterfly								
100m individual medley	58.84		Édgar Crespo	Panama	14 October 2016	Plzenske Sprinty	Plzeň, Czech Republic	
200m individual medley	2:07.30	h	Charles Alexander Keller	Panama	14 December 2012	World Championships	Istanbul, Turkey	
400m individual medley	4:31.12	h	Diego Castillo	Panama	10 April 2008	World Championships	Manchester, Great Britain	
4×50m freestyle relay								
4×100m freestyle relay								
4×200m freestyle relay								
4×50m medley relay								
4×100m medley relay								

Legend: # – Record awaiting ratification by FPN; WR – World record; AM – Americas record; e – equalled existing record;
Records not set in finals: h – heat; sf – semifinal; r – relay 1st leg; rh – relay heat 1st leg; b – B final; † – en route to final mark; so – swim-off; tt – time trial

=== Women ===
Event	Time		Name	Club	Date	Meet	Location	Ref
50m freestyle	24.41		Eileen Coparropa	Panama	18 March 2004	NCAA Championships	College Station, United States	
100m freestyle	54.43		Eileen Coparropa	Panama	20 March 2004	NCAA Championships	College Station, United States	
200m freestyle	2:08.81	h	Ireyra Tamayo Periñan	Panama	6 December 2016	World Championships	Windsor, Canada	
400m freestyle								
800m freestyle								
1500m freestyle								
50m backstroke	29.00	h	Carolina Cermelli	Panama	15 December 2022	World Championships	Melbourne, Australia	
100m backstroke	1:02.95		Carolina Cermelli	De Dolfijn	29 October 2022	Martinez Chocolade Cup	Amsterdam, Netherlands	
200m backstroke	2:12.40	h	Carolina Cermelli	Panama	18 December 2022	World Championships	Melbourne, Australia	
50m breaststroke	32.08	h	Emily Santos	Panama	16 December 2021	World Championships	Abu Dhabi, United Arab Emirates	
100m breaststroke	1:07.37	h	Emily Santos	Panama	11 December 2024	World Championships	Budapest, Hungary	
200m breaststroke	2:25.26	h	Emily Santos	Panama	13 December 2024	World Championships	Budapest, Hungary	
50m butterfly	28.29	h	Maria Castillo	Stipendium Hungaricum	6 November 2026	Hungarian Championships	Kaposvár, Hungary	
100m butterfly	1:04.65	h	Ireyra Tamayo Periñan	Panama	10 December 2016	World Championships	Windsor, Canada	
200m butterfly								
100m individual medley								
200m individual medley	2:22.86	h	María Far Núñez	Panama	6 December 2014	World Championships	Doha, Qatar	
400m individual medley	5:03.98	h	María Far Núñez	Panama	3 December 2014	World Championships	Doha, Qatar	
4×50m freestyle relay								
4×100m freestyle relay								
4×200m freestyle relay								
4×50m medley relay								
4×100m medley relay								

Legend: # – Record awaiting ratification by FPN; WR – World record; AM – Americas record; e – equalled existing record;
Records not set in finals: h – heat; sf – semifinal; r – relay 1st leg; rh – relay heat 1st leg; b – B final; † – en route to final mark; so – swim-off; tt – time trial

=== Mixed relay ===
Event	Time		Name	Club	Date	Meet	Location	Ref
4×50m freestyle relay	1:41.11	h	Hernan Mauricio Gonzalez Medina (24.28); Ireyra Guadalupe Tamayo Perinan (26.83); Catharine Cooper Gomez (26.17); Jeancarlo Calderon Harper (23.83)	Panama	7 December 2016	World Championships	Windsor, Canada	
4×50m medley relay	1:49.61	h	Nimia Murua (30.34); Édgar Crespo (27.16); Isaac Beitia (24.89); Maria Castillo (27.22)	Panama	13 December 2018	World Championships	Hangzhou, China	

Legend: # – Record awaiting ratification by FPN; WR – World record; AM – Americas record; e – equalled existing record;
Records not set in finals: h – heat; so – swim-off
