= List of Guatemalan records in swimming =

The Guatemala records in swimming are the fastest ever performances of swimmers from Guatemala, which are recognised and ratified by the Federacion Nacional de Natacion, Clavado, Polo Acuatico y Nado Sincronizado (FENADEGUA).

All records were set in finals unless noted otherwise.

== Long Course (50 m) ==
=== Men ===
Event	Time		Name	Club	Date	Meet	Location	Ref
50 m freestyle	22.61		Luis Martínez	Guatemala	25 July 2018	CAC Games	Barranquilla, Colombia	
100 m freestyle	50.79	h	Luis Martínez	Guatemala	17 May 2019	TYR Pro Swim Series	Bloomington, United States	
200 m freestyle	1:50.74		Erick Gordillo	Guatemala	21 October 2025	Central American Games	Guatemala City, Guatemala	
400 m freestyle	3:58.43		Erick Gordillo	Guatemala	20 October 2025	Central American Games	Guatemala City, Guatemala	
800 m freestyle	8:22.17		Erick Gordillo	Guatemala	3 March 2020	Barbadian Championships	Bridgetown, Barbados	
1500 m freestyle	15:54.20		Evan Marcus	Guatemala	25 June 2005	-	United States	
50 m backstroke	26.66		Erick Gordillo	Guatemala	20 May 2021	Puerto Rican International Open	Salinas, Puerto Rico	
100 m backstroke	56.95		Erick Gordillo	Guatemala	20 October 2025	Central American Games	Guatemala City, Guatemala	
200 m backstroke	2:02.88		Erick Gordillo	Guatemala	25 November 2025	Bolivarian Games	Lima, Peru	
50 m breaststroke	28.80		Álvaro Fortuny	Guatemala	19 May 2000	-	Rome, Italy	
100 m breaststroke	1:02.70	h	Reberto Bonilla	Unattached	7 June 2025	Texas Senior Circuit Meet	Dallas, United States	
200 m breaststroke	2:12.60		Reberto Bonilla	Guatemala	12 August 2025	Junior Pan American Games	Asunción, Paraguay	
50 m butterfly	23.26		Luis Martínez	Guatemala	22 July 2018	CAC Games	Barranquilla, Colombia	
100 m butterfly	51.09		Luis Martínez	Guatemala	31 July 2021	Olympic Games	Tokyo, Japan	
200 m butterfly	1:58.14		Erick Gordillo	Guatemala	26 November 2025	Bolivarian Games	Lima, Peru	
200 m individual medley	2:00.89		Reberto Bonilla	Guatemala	14 August 2025	Junior Pan American Games	Asunción, Paraguay	
400 m individual medley	4:17.68		Erick Gordillo	Guatemala	29 July 2026	CAC Games	Santo Domingo, Dominican Republic	
4×100m freestyle relay	3:30.78		Miguel Vaásquez (52.47); Roberto Gossmann (51.61); Erick Gordillo (51.39); Reberto Bonilla (55.31)	Guatemala	29 July 2026	CAC Games	Santo Domingo, Dominican Republic	
4×200m freestyle relay	7:43.62		Jose Barrios (1:57.01); Cristian Garcíá (1:58.59); Roberto Gossmann (1:55.60); Erick Gordillo (1:52.42)	Guatemala	17 October 2025	Central American Games	Guatemala City, Guatemala	
4×100m medley relay	3:51.88		Miguel Vaásquez (1:00.08); Miguel Turcios (1:05.72); Erick Gordillo (54.47); Roberto Gossmann (51.61)	Guatemala	22 October 2025	Central American Games	Guatemala City, Guatemala	

Legend: # – Record awaiting ratification by Federacion Nacional de Natacion, Clavado, Polo Acuatico y Nado Sincronizado; WR – World record; AM – Americas record;
Records not set in finals: h – heat; sf – semifinal; r – relay 1st leg; rh – relay heat 1st leg; b – B final; † – en route to final mark; so – swim-off; tt – time trial

=== Women ===
Event	Time		Name	Club	Date	Meet	Location	Ref
50m freestyle	26.63		Gabriela Santis	Guatemala	25 July 2018	CAC Games	Barranquilla, Colombia	
100m freestyle	56.98		Belén Morales	Guatemala	19 October 2025	Central American Games	Guatemala City, Guatemala	
200m freestyle	2:02.01		Valerie Gruest	Guatemala	24 June 2016	-	Bahamas	
400m freestyle	4:10.80		Valerie Gruest	Guatemala	26 June 2016	-	Bahamas	
800m freestyle	8:33.28		Valerie Gruest	Guatemala	23 June 2016	-	Bahamas	
1500m freestyle	16:34.81	h	Valerie Gruest	Guatemala	3 August 2015	World Championships	Kazan, Russia	
50m backstroke	28.28		Gisela Morales	Guatemala	15 May 2015	-	Charlotte, United States	
100m backstroke	1:00.99	h	Gisela Morales	Guatemala	17 July 2015	Pan American Games	Toronto, Canada	
200m backstroke	2:12.36		Gisela Morales	Guatemala	23 July 2010	CAC Games	Mayagüez, Puerto Rico	
50m breaststroke	33.67		Stephanie Iannaccone	PRI	25 April 2025	Guatemalan Championships	Mazatenango, Guatemala	
100m breaststroke	1:11.15		Stephanie Iannaccone	Walnut Creek Aquabears	24 July 2024	Futures Championships	Sacramento, United States	
200m breaststroke	2:33.77	h	Stephanie Iannaccone	Guatemala	15 February 2024	World Championships	Doha, Qatar	
50m butterfly	27.58		Danika Gwisinga	-	6 April 2017	-	Toronto, Canada	
100m butterfly	1:02.05		Valerie Gruest	Guatemala	7 June 2016	CAMEX	Panama City, Panama	
200m butterfly	2:12.82	h	Valerie Gruest	Guatemala	5 August 2015	World Championships	Kazan, Russia	
200m individual medley	2:18.45	h	Stephanie Iannaccone	Guatemala	11 February 2024	World Championships	Doha, Qatar	
400m individual medley	4:51.33		Valerie Gruest	-	6 May 2017	-	Atlanta, United States	
4×50m freestyle relay	1:58.05		Claudia Rivera; Luisa Caniz; Patricia Rivera; Blanca Morales	-	17 December 1992	-	Guatemala	
4×100m freestyle relay	3:54.54		Maria Morales (58.11); Lucero Mejía (58.54); Stephanie Iannaccone (59.03); Melissa Diego (58.86)	Guatemala	29 July 2026	CAC Games	Santo Domingo, Dominican Republic	
4×200m freestyle relay	8:38.80		Lucero Mejía (2:09.70); Yanci Vanegas (2:11.39); Sara Fernandez (2:12.17); Belén Morales (2:05.54)	Guatemala	19 October 2025	Central American Games	Guatemala City, Guatemala	
4×100m medley relay	4:21.18		Melissa Diego (1:03.04); Alejandra Alvarado (1:17.13); Emilia Sandoval (1:04.00); Belén Morales (57.01)	Guatemala	22 October 2025	Central American Games	Guatemala City, Guatemala	

Legend: # – Record awaiting ratification by Federacion Nacional de Natacion, Clavado, Polo Acuatico y Nado Sincronizado; WR – World record; AM – Americas record;
Records not set in finals: h – heat; sf – semifinal; r – relay 1st leg; rh – relay heat 1st leg; b – B final; † – en route to final mark; so – swim-off; tt – time trial

=== Mixed relay ===
Event	Time	Name	Nationality	Date	Location	Ref
4×50 m freestyle relay	1:45.44	Guillermo Lima; Stefanie Mendizabal; Valerie Gruest; Erick Gordillo	Guatemala	7 June 2016	2016 CAMEX	Panama City, Panama
4×100 m freestyle relay	3:40.12	Roberto Gossmann (52.68); Erick Gordillo (51.46); Lucero Mejía (59.28); Belén Morales (56.70)	Guatemala	20 October 2025	Central American Games	Guatemala City, Guatemala
4×50 m medley relay						
4×100 m medley relay	4:02.56	Lucero Mejía (1:05.07); Reberto Bonilla (1:02.35); Stephanie Iannaccone (1:02.77); Roberto Gossmann (52.37)	Guatemala	12 August 2025	Junior Pan American Games	Asunción, Paraguay

Legend: # – Record awaiting ratification by Federacion Nacional de Natacion, Clavado, Polo Acuatico y Nado Sincronizado;
Records not set in finals: h – heat; so – swim-off

== Short Course (25 m) ==
=== Men ===
Event	Time		Name	Club	Date	Meet	Location	Ref
50m freestyle	22.94	h, =	Kevin Avila	Guatemala	8 December 2016	World Championships	Windsor, Canada	
50m freestyle	22.94	h, =	Miguel Vasquez	Guatemala	14 December 2024	World Championships	Budapest, Hungary	
100m freestyle	49.77	h	Miguel Vasquez	Guatemala	14 December 2022	World Championships	Melbourne, Australia	
200m freestyle	1:50.06		Erick Gordillo	Delfines	2 September 2022	Guatemalan Championships	Zacapa, Guatemala	
400m freestyle	3:58.02		Erick Gordillo	Delfines	3 September 2022	Guatemalan Championships	Zacapa, Guatemala	
800m freestyle	8:34.11		Luis Martínez	-	30 September 2012	Guatemalan Championships	Zacapa, Guatemala	
800m freestyle	8:25.43	h, †, not ratified	Emilio Avila	Guatemala	10 December 2016	World Championships	Windsor, Canada	
1500m freestyle	15:57.90	h	Emilio Avila	Guatemala	10 December 2016	World Championships	Windsor, Canada	
50m backstroke	25.31	h	Miguel Vasquez	Guatemala	15 December 2022	World Championships	Melbourne, Australia	
100m backstroke	56.29		Erick Gordillo	Delfines	22 September 2018	Guatemalan Championships	Zacapa, Guatemala	
200m backstroke	1:59.80	h	Erick Gordillo	Guatemala	16 December 2018	World Championships	Hangzhou, China	
50m breaststroke	30.03		Miguel Turcios	-	29 August 2021	Guatemalan Championships	Zacapa, Guatemala	
50m breaststroke	29.26	h, not ratified by federation	Álvaro Fortuny	Guatemala	12 April 2008	World Championships	Manchester, Great Britain	
100m breaststroke	1:06.79		José Regalado	-	15 October 2010	Guatemalan Championships	Zacapa, Guatemala	
100m breaststroke	1:06.05	h, not ratified by federation	Álvaro Fortuny	Guatemala	9 April 2008	World Championships	Manchester, Great Britain	
200m breaststroke	2:23.17		Bryan Vásquez	-	21 October 2016	-	Quetzaltenango, Guatemala	
50m butterfly	24.64		Erick Gordillo	Delfines	27 August 2021	Guatemalan Championships	Zacapa, Guatemala	
100m butterfly	54.85		Erick Gordillo	Delfines	4 September 2022	Guatemalan Championships	Zacapa, Guatemala	
200m butterfly	1:56.15	h	Erick Gordillo	Guatemala	12 December 2024	World Championships	Budapest, Hungary	
100m individual medley	55.45	h	Erick Gordillo	Guatemala	18 December 2021	World Championships	Abu Dhabi, United Arab Emirates	
200m individual medley	1:58.03	h	Erick Gordillo	Guatemala	10 December 2024	World Championships	Budapest, Hungary	
400m individual medley	4:10.97	h	Erick Gordillo	Guatemala	17 December 2022	World Championships	Melbourne, Australia	
4×50m freestyle relay								
4×100m freestyle relay	4:08.34		Ernesto Berger; Christian Alvarez; Alvaro Fortuny; Harry Lewis	-	1995	-	Zacapa, Guatemala	
4×200m freestyle relay								
4×50m medley relay								
4×100m medley relay	4:38.72		Christian Alvarez; Alvaro Fortuny; Ernesto Berger; Harry Lewis	-	1995	-	Zacapa, Guatemala	

Legend: # – Record awaiting ratification by Federacion Nacional de Natacion, Clavado, Polo Acuatico y Nado Sincronizado; WR – World record; AM – Americas record;
Records not set in finals: h – heat; sf – semifinal; r – relay 1st leg; rh – relay heat 1st leg; b – B final; † – en route to final mark; so – swim-off; tt – time trial

=== Women ===
Event	Time		Name	Club	Date	Meet	Location	Ref
50m freestyle	26.70		Lucero Mejía	Guatemala	17 March 2023	-	Nicaragua	
100m freestyle	57.77		Belén Morales	Guatemala	21 October 2022	-	Mexico	
200m freestyle	2:02.57	h	Lucero Mejia	Guatemala	18 December 2022	World Championships	Melbourne, Australia	
400m freestyle	4:14.75	h	Valerie Gruest	Guatemala	5 December 2014	World Championships	Doha, Qatar	
800m freestyle	8:44.78		Valerie Gruest	Guatemala	4 December 2014	World Championships	Doha, Qatar	
1500 m freestyle	17:59.40		Valerie Gruest	-	28 September 2012	-	Zacapa, Guatemala	
50m backstroke	30.05		Lucero Mejía	-	4 September 2021	-	La Libertad, El Salvador	
50m backstroke	29.42	'#'	Lucero Mejía	Programa	27 May 2023	Guatemalan Championships	Quetzaltenango, Guatemala	
100m backstroke	1:01.23	h	Melissa Diego	Guatemala	10 December 2024	World Championships	Budapest, Hungary	
200m backstroke	2:15.02	h	Melissa Diego	Guatemala	15 December 2024	World Championships	Budapest, Hungary	
50m breaststroke	33.79		Krista Jurado	-	29 August 2021	-	Zacapa, Guatemala	
50m breaststroke	33.70	h, †, not ratified	Krista Jurado	Guatemala	19 December 2021	World Championships	Abu Dhabi, United Arab Emirates	
100m breaststroke	1:11.87		Krista Jurado	Individuales Gisela	26 August 2021	Guatemalan Championships	Zacapa, Guatemala	
200m breaststroke	2:35.17		Krista Jurado	Individuales Gisela	27 August 2021	Guatemalan Championships	Zacapa, Guatemala	
50m butterfly	28.76		Lucero Mejía	Guatemala	18 March 2023	-	Nicaragua	
100m butterfly	1:03.17	h	Valerie Gruest	Guatemala	6 December 2014	World Championships	Doha, Qatar	
200m butterfly	2:13.07	h	Valerie Gruest	Guatemala	3 December 2014	World Championships	Doha, Qatar	
100m individual medley	1:06.25		Krista Jurado	Individuales Gisela	26 August 2021	Guatemalan Championships	Zacapa, Guatemala	
200m individual medley	2:18.33		Lucero Mejía	Guatemala	17 March 2023	-	Nicaragua	
400m individual medley	4:55.29	h	Maria Coy	Guatemala	9 April 2008	World Championships	Manchester, Great Britain	
4×50m freestyle relay								
4×100m freestyle relay	4:36.17		Claudia Estrada; Marielos Juarez; Ruby Garcia; Lucia Jimenez	-	1995	Zacapa, Guatemala		
4×200m freestyle relay								
4×50m medley relay								
4×100m medley relay	5:13.41		Lucia Jimenez; Marielos Juarez; Claudia Estrada; Ruby Garcia	-	1995	Zacapa, Guatemala		

Legend: # – Record awaiting ratification by Federacion Nacional de Natacion, Clavado, Polo Acuatico y Nado Sincronizado; WR – World record; AM – Americas record;
Records not set in finals: h – heat; sf – semifinal; r – relay 1st leg; rh – relay heat 1st leg; b – B final; † – en route to final mark; so – swim-off; tt – time trial
