= Swimming at the 2019 Pan American Games – Men's 400 metre individual medley =

Men's 400 metre individual medley at the 2019 Pan American Games
- Venue: Villa Deportiva Nacional, VIDENA
- Dates: August 9 (preliminaries and finals)
- Competitors: 17 from 12 nations
- Winning time: 4:11.46

Medalists
Gold medal	Charlie Swanson	United States
Silver medal	Leonardo Coelho Santos	Brazil
Bronze medal	Brandonn Almeida	Brazil

The men's 400 metre individual medley competition of the swimming events at the 2019 Pan American Games are scheduled to be held August 9th, 2019 at the Villa Deportiva Nacional Videna cluster.

== Records ==
Prior to this competition, the existing world and Pan American Games records were as follows:

World record	Michael Phelps (USA)	4:03.84	Beijing, China	August 10, 2008
Pan American Games record	Thiago Pereira (BRA)	4:11.14	Rio de Janeiro, Brazil	July 17, 2007

== Results ==
KEY:	q	Fastest non-qualifiers	Q	Qualified	GR	Games record	NR	National record	PB	Personal best	SB	Seasonal best

=== Heats ===
The first round will be held on August 9.

Rank	Heat	Lane	Name	Nationality	Time	Notes
1	3	4	Charlie Swanson	United States	4:16.66	QA
2	2	4	Brandonn Almeida	Brazil	4:23.24	QA
3	2	3	Jarod Arroyo	Puerto Rico	4:23.70	QA
4	3	5	Tomas Peribonio	Ecuador	4:23.77	QA
5	2	5	Leonardo Coelho Santos	Brazil	4:24.51	QA
6	2	6	Héctor Ruvalcaba	Mexico	4:25.11	QA
7	2	2	Erick Gordillo Guzman	Guatemala	4:26.64	QA, NR
8	3	7	Santiago Corredor	Colombia	4:27.66	QA
9	3	6	Miguel Ángel Cancel	Puerto Rico	4:27.95	QB
10	3	1	Bernhard Christianson	Panama	4:28.34	QB, NR
11	3	2	Luis Vega Torres	Cuba	4:29.14	QB
12	2	7	Jonathan Gómez	Colombia	4:29.34	QB
13	3	3	Ricardo Vargas	Mexico	4:33.22	WD
14	1	5	Gustavo Gutierrez Lozano	Peru	4:35.14	QB
15	1	4	Jose Neumann Doig	Peru	4:35.89	QB
16	2	1	Matías López	Paraguay	4:36.13	WD
17	1	3	Manuel Osorio Moran	Chile	4:37.11	WD

=== Final B ===
The B final was also held on August 9.

Rank	Lane	Name	Nationality	Time	Notes
9	3	Luis Vega Torres	Cuba	4:25.05	NR
10	5	Bernhard Christianson	Panama	4:25.93	NR
11	4	Miguel Ángel Cancel	Puerto Rico	4:28.54	
12	6	Jonathan Gómez	Colombia	4:31.66	
13	2	Gustavo Gutierrez Lozano	Peru	4:35.05	
14	7	Jose Neumann Doig	Peru	4:46.10	

=== Final A ===
The A final was also held on August 9.

Rank	Lane	Name	Nationality	Time	Notes
1st place, gold medalist(s)	4	Charlie Swanson	United States	4:11.46	
2nd place, silver medalist(s)	2	Leonardo Coelho Santos	Brazil	4:19.41	
3rd place, bronze medalist(s)	5	Brandonn Almeida	Brazil	4:21.10	
4	6	Tomas Peribonio	Ecuador	4:22.21	
5	3	Jarod Arroyo	Puerto Rico	4:22.87	
6	7	Héctor Ruvalcaba	Mexico	4:24.18	
7	1	Erick Gordillo Guzman	Guatemala	4:25.62	NR
8	8	Santiago Corredor	Colombia	4:35.44	
