= Swimming at the 2015 Pan American Games – Women's 200 metre butterfly =

Women's 200 metre butterfly at the 2015 Pan American Games
- Venue: CIBC Pan Am/Parapan Am Aquatics Centre and Field House
- Dates: July 14 (preliminaries and finals)
- Competitors: 17 from 14 nations
- Winning time: 2:07.68

Medalists
| Gold medal | Audrey Lacroix | Canada |
| Silver medal | Katherine Mills | United States |
| Bronze medal | Joanna Maranhão | Brazil |

The women's 200 metre butterfly competition of the swimming events at the 2015 Pan American Games took place on July 14 at the CIBC Pan Am/Parapan Am Aquatics Centre and Field House in Toronto, Canada. The defending Pan American Games champion was Kim Vandenberg of the United States.

This race consisted of four lengths of the pool, all lengths in butterfly. The top eight swimmers from the heats would qualify for the A final (where the medals would be awarded), while the next best eight swimmers would qualify for the B final.

== Records ==
Prior to this competition, the existing world and Pan American Games records were as follows:

| World record | Zige Liu (CHN) | 2:01.81 | Jinan, China | October 21, 2009 |
| Pan American Games record | Kathleen Hersey (USA) | 2:07.64 | Rio de Janeiro, Brazil | July 21, 2007 |

== Qualification ==
Each National Olympic Committee (NOC) was able to enter up to two entrants providing they had met the A standard (2:17.99) in the qualifying period (January 1, 2014 to May 1, 2015). NOCs were also permitted to enter one athlete providing they had met the B standard (2:26.27) in the same qualifying period. All other competing athletes were entered as universality spots.

== Schedule ==
All times are Eastern Time Zone (UTC-4).

| Date | Time | Round |
|---|---|---|
| July 14, 2015 | 10:29 | Heats |
| July 14, 2015 | 19:39 | Final B |
| July 14, 2015 | 19:46 | Final A |

== Results ==
| KEY: | q | Fastest non-qualifiers | Q | Qualified | GR | Games record | NR | National record | PB | Personal best | SB | Seasonal best |

=== Heats ===
The first round was held on July 14.

| Rank | Heat | Lane | Name | Nationality | Time | Notes |
|---|---|---|---|---|---|---|
| 1 | 2 | 4 | Katherine Mills | United States | 2:08.89 | QA |
| 2 | 3 | 4 | Audrey Lacroix | Canada | 2:10.33 | QA |
| 3 | 3 | 5 | Andreina Pinto | Venezuela | 2:10.98 | QA |
| 4 | 2 | 6 | Virginia Bardach | Argentina | 2:12.31 | QA, NR |
| 5 | 3 | 3 | Isabella Paez | Venezuela | 2:12.63 | QA |
| 6 | 1 | 4 | Joanna Maranhão | Brazil | 2:12.64 | QA |
| 7 | 1 | 6 | Valerie Gruest | Guatemala | 2:13.87 | QA |
| 8 | 2 | 3 | Diana Luna | Mexico | 2:14.21 | QA |
| 9 | 1 | 3 | Jessica Camposano | Colombia | 2:14.35 | QB |
| 10 | 3 | 6 | Manuella Lyrio | Brazil | 2:15.55 | QB |
| 11 | 1 | 5 | Kylie Stewart | United States | 2:16.22 | QB |
| 12 | 2 | 2 | Maria Far | Panama | 2:18.57 | QB |
| 12 | 3 | 2 | Tereysa Lehnertz | Puerto Rico | 2:18.57 | QB |
| 14 | 1 | 2 | Estefania Urzua | Chile | 2:19.23 | QB |
| 15 | 2 | 7 | Lara Butler | Cayman Islands | 2:22.81 | QB |
| 16 | 3 | 7 | Trudian Patrick | Jamaica | 2:24.26 | QB |
| 17 | 1 | 7 | Daniella van den Berg | Aruba | 2:26.04 | |
| | 2 | 5 | Noemie Thomas | Canada | DNS | |

=== B Final ===
The B final was also held on July 14.

| Rank | Lane | Name | Nationality | Time | Notes |
|---|---|---|---|---|---|
| 9 | 5 | Manuella Lyrio | Brazil | 2:13.37 | |
| 10 | 4 | Jessica Camposano | Colombia | 2:14.22 | |
| 11 | 3 | Kylie Stewart | United States | 2:14.64 | |
| 12 | 2 | Tereysa Lehnertz | Puerto Rico | 2:18.05 | |
| 13 | 7 | Estefania Urzua | Chile | 2:18.16 | |
| 14 | 6 | Maria Far | Panama | 2:18.75 | |
| 15 | 1 | Lara Butler | Cayman Islands | 2:21.52 | |
| 16 | 8 | Trudian Patrick | Jamaica | 2:23.65 | |

=== A Final ===
The A final was also held on July 14.

| Rank | Lane | Name | Nationality | Time | Notes |
|---|---|---|---|---|---|
| 1st place, gold medalist(s) | 5 | Audrey Lacroix | Canada | 2:07.68 | |
| 2nd place, silver medalist(s) | 4 | Katherine Mills | United States | 2:09.31 | |
| 3rd place, bronze medalist(s) | 7 | Joanna Maranhão | Brazil | 2:09.38 | SA |
| 4 | 3 | Andreina Pinto | Venezuela | 2:09.51 | NR |
| 5 | 6 | Virginia Bardach | Argentina | 2:13.25 | |
| 6 | 2 | Isabella Paez | Venezuela | 2:13.64 | |
| 7 | 8 | Diana Luna | Mexico | 2:13.90 | |
| 8 | 1 | Valerie Gruest | Guatemala | 2:14.03 | |
