= Swimming at the 2014 South American Games – Women's 400 metre individual medley =

Women's 400 metre individual medley at the 2014 South American Games
- Venue: Estadio Nacional
- Dates: March 8, 2014 (heats & finals)
- Competitors: 10 from 6 nations
- Winning time: 4:51.17

Medalists
gold medal	Andreina Pinto	Venezuela
silver medal	Virginia Bardach	Argentina
bronze medal	Júlia Gerotto	Brazil

The women's 400 metre individual medley competition at the 2014 South American Games took place on March 8 at the Estadio Nacional. The last champion was Joanna Maranhão of Brazil.

This race consisted of eight lengths of the pool. The first two lengths were swum using the butterfly stroke, the second pair with the backstroke, the third pair of lengths in breaststroke, and the final two were freestyle.

== Records ==
Prior to this competition, the existing world and Pan Pacific records were as follows:

World record	Ye Shiwen (CHN)	4:28.43	London, Great Britain	July 18, 2012
South American Games record	Joanna Maranhão (BRA)	4:52.84	Medellín, Colombia	March 27, 2010

== Results ==
All times are in minutes and seconds.

KEY:	q	Fastest non-qualifiers	Q	Qualified	CR	Championships record	NR	National record	PB	Personal best	SB	Seasonal best

=== Heats ===
The first round was held on March 8, at 11:31.

Rank	Heat	Lane	Name	Nationality	Time	Notes
1	1	4	Andreina Pinto	Venezuela	5:03.30	Q
2	1	3	Kristel Köbrich	Chile	5:04.26	Q
3	1	5	Florencia Perotti	Argentina	5:04.93	Q
4	2	4	Samantha Arévalo	Ecuador	5:07.28	Q
5	2	3	Virginia Bardach	Argentina	5:07.49	Q
6	2	2	Maria Far	Panama	5:08.05	Q
7	2	5	Júlia Gerotto	Brazil	5:10.38	Q
8	2	6	Nathalia Almeida	Brazil	5:12.05	Q
9	1	6	Isabella Paez	Venezuela	5:16.81	
10	1	2	Avalon Schultz Donlan	Chile	5:20.55	

=== Final ===
The final was held on March 8, at 19:43.

Rank	Lane	Name	Nationality	Time	Notes
1st place, gold medalist(s)	4	Andreina Pinto	Venezuela	4:51.17	CR
2nd place, silver medalist(s)	2	Virginia Bardach	Argentina	4:52.94	
3rd place, bronze medalist(s)	1	Júlia Gerotto	Brazil	4:55.36	
4	6	Samantha Arévalo	Ecuador	4:55.86	
5	3	Florencia Perotti	Argentina	4:59.84	
6	5	Kristel Köbrich	Chile	5:02.26	
7	7	Maria Far	Panama	5:04.28	
8	8	Nathalia Almeida	Brazil	5:12.76	
