= Swimming at the 2020 Summer Olympics – Men's 100 metre butterfly =

Men's 100 metre butterfly at the Games of the XXXII Olympiad
- Venue: Tokyo Aquatics Centre
- Dates: 29 July 2021 (heats); 30 July 2021 (semifinals); 31 July 2021 (final)
- Competitors: 56 from 45 nations
- Winning time: 49.45 WR

Medalists
1st place, gold medalist(s)		Caeleb Dressel	United States
2nd place, silver medalist(s)		Kristóf Milák	Hungary
3rd place, bronze medalist(s)		Noè Ponti	Switzerland

The men's 100 metre butterfly event at the 2020 Summer Olympics was held from 29 to 31 July 2021 at the Tokyo Aquatics Centre. It was the event's fourteenth consecutive appearance, having been held at every edition since 1968.

The medals for the competition were presented by Ng Ser Miang, IOC Vice-President, Singapore; and the medalists' bouquets were presented by Dale Neuburger, FINA Treasurer; United States.

== Summary ==
U.S. megastar Caeleb Dressel fended off a late charge by Kristóf Milák to win his second individual Olympic title in a world record of 49.45. Dressel used his signature explosive start and breakout to establish an early lead, turning first at the 50 m mark 0.65 seconds clear of the field. Though Milák closed strongly, Dressel held on for the victory and lower his world record by 5-hundredths of a second. Meanwhile Milák, the 200 m butterfly champion from earlier in the week, could not overtake Dressel but touched in a European record of 49.68 to win silver and pass Michael Phelps and Milorad Čavić to become the second fastest performer in history.

Switzerland's Noè Ponti (50.74) eclipsed his national record from the semi-finals by 0.02 seconds to claim the final spot on the podium. Tied second at the turn alongside Milák, ROC's Andrey Minakov (50.88) fell off the podium to take fourth. Matching his Polish record from the heats, Poland's Jakub Majerski (50.92) tied for fifth with Australia's Matthew Temple who could not replicate his stunning 50.45 trials performance. Guatemala's Luis Martínez touched in a national record of 51.09 to take seventh, while Bulgaria's Josif Miladinov (51.49) was a shade off his times in the earlier rounds to finish in eighth.

Singapore's Joseph Schooling, the gold medalist from Rio de Janeiro five years ago, did not qualify in the semifinal stage, with a time of 53.12.

The medals for the competition were presented by Singapore's IOC Vice-President Ng Ser Miang, and the gifts were presented by the U.S.' FINA Treasurer Dale Neuburger.

== Records ==
Prior to this competition, the existing world and Olympic records were as follows.

World record	Caeleb Dressel (USA)	49.50	Gwangju, South Korea	26 July 2019
Olympic record	Joseph Schooling (SIN)	50.39	Rio de Janeiro, Brazil	12 August 2016

The following records were established during the competition:

Date	Event	Swimmer	Nation	Time	Record
29 July	Heat 8	Caeleb Dressel	United States	50.39	=OR
30 July	Semifinal 1	Kristóf Milák	Hungary	50.31	OR
30 July	Semifinal 2	Caeleb Dressel	United States	49.71	OR
31 July	Final	Caeleb Dressel	United States	49.45	WR

== Qualification ==
The Olympic Qualifying Time for the event is 51.96 seconds. Up to two swimmers per National Olympic Committee (NOC) can automatically qualify by swimming that time at an approved qualification event. The Olympic Selection Time is 53.52 seconds. Up to one swimmer per NOC meeting that time is eligible for selection, allocated by world ranking until the maximum quota for all swimming events is reached. NOCs without a male swimmer qualified in any event can also use their universality place.

== Competition format ==
The competition consists of three rounds: heats, semifinals, and a final. The swimmers with the best 16 times in the heats advance to the semifinals. The swimmers with the best 8 times in the semifinals advance to the final. Swim-offs are used as necessary to break ties for advancement to the next round.

== Schedule ==
All times are Japan Standard Time (UTC+9)

Date	Time	Round
29 July 2021	19:43	Heats
30 July 2021	10:30	Semifinals
31 July 2021	10:30	Final

== Results ==
=== Heats ===
The swimmers with the top 16 times, regardless of heat, advanced to the semifinals.

Rank	Heat	Lane	Swimmer	Nation	Time	Notes
1	8	4	Caeleb Dressel	United States	50.39	Q, =OR
2	7	4	Kristóf Milák	Hungary	50.62	Q
3	8	6	Jakub Majerski	Poland	50.97	Q, NR
4	8	5	Andrey Minakov	ROC	51.00	Q
5	7	6	Noè Ponti	Switzerland	51.24	Q
6	6	5	Josif Miladinov	Bulgaria	51.28	Q
7	6	7	Luis Martínez	Guatemala	51.29	Q, NR
8	6	4	Matthew Temple	Australia	51.39	Q
9	7	7	Joshua Liendo	Canada	51.52	Q
10	7	5	Mehdy Metella	France	51.53	Q
11	5	1	Nyls Korstanje	Netherlands	51.54	Q, NR
12	6	3	Naoki Mizunuma	Japan	51.57	Q
12	8	2	Tom Shields	United States	51.57	Q
14	5	2	Youssef Ramadan	Egypt	51.67	Q, NR
14	7	2	Szebasztián Szabó	Hungary	51.67	Q
16	5	6	Sun Jiajun	China	51.74	Q
17	6	2	Federico Burdisso	Italy	51.82	
18	6	6	Chad le Clos	South Africa	51.89	
18	8	7	Mikhail Vekovishchev	ROC	51.89	
20	7	3	Takeshi Kawamoto	Japan	51.93	
21	5	3	Tomer Frankel	Israel	51.99	
22	6	8	Paweł Korzeniowski	Poland	52.00	
23	7	1	Marius Kusch	Germany	52.05	
24	4	6	Santiago Grassi	Argentina	52.07	
24	8	8	Jacob Peters	Great Britain	52.07	
26	7	8	Vinicius Lanza	Brazil	52.08	
27	3	2	Tomoe Zenimoto Hvas	Norway	52.22	NR
28	4	8	Louis Croenen	Belgium	52.23	
29	4	7	Antani Ivanov	Bulgaria	52.25	
30	8	1	David Morgan	Australia	52.31	
31	6	1	Santo Condorelli	Italy	52.32	
32	5	7	Matthew Sates	South Africa	52.34	
33	3	7	Dylan Carter	Trinidad and Tobago	52.36	NR
34	4	4	Quah Zheng Wen	Singapore	52.39	
35	3	4	Wang Kuan-hung	Chinese Taipei	52.44	
35	4	3	Ümitcan Güreş	Turkey	52.44	
37	3	8	Shane Ryan	Ireland	52.52	NR
37	4	5	Jan Šefl	Czech Republic	52.52	
37	5	5	Simon Bucher	Austria	52.52	
40	3	6	Nikola Miljenić	Croatia	52.68	
41	3	1	Kregor Zirk	Estonia	52.82	
42	5	4	Yauhen Tsurkin	Belarus	52.90	
43	4	1	Matheus Gonche	Brazil	53.02	
44	5	8	Joseph Schooling	Singapore	53.12	
45	2	2	Abeku Jackson	Ghana	53.39	NR
46	2	5	Sajan Prakash	India	53.45	
47	2	4	Moon Seung-woo	South Korea	53.59	
48	2	3	Abbas Qali	Kuwait	53.62	
49	2	1	Steven Aimable	Senegal	53.64	
50	2	7	Navaphat Wongcharoen	Thailand	54.36	
51	2	6	Benjamin Hockin	Paraguay	54.81	
51	2	8	Davidson Vincent	Haiti	54.81	
53	3	5	Daniel Martin	Romania	55.09	
54	1	4	Salvador Gordo	Angola	55.96	
55	1	5	Yousif Bu Arish	Saudi Arabia	56.29	NR
	1	3	Abdulla Ahmed	Bahrain	DSQ	
	3	3	Ihor Troianovskyi	Ukraine	DNS	
	4	2	Gal Cohen Groumi	Israel	DNS	
	8	3	James Guy	Great Britain	DNS	

=== Semifinals ===
The swimmers with the best 8 times, regardless of semis, advanced to the final.

Rank	Heat	Lane	Swimmer	Nation	Time	Notes
1	2	4	Caeleb Dressel	United States	49.71	Q, OR
2	1	4	Kristóf Milák	Hungary	50.31	Q
3	2	3	Noè Ponti	Switzerland	50.76	Q, NR
4	1	3	Josif Miladinov	Bulgaria	51.06	Q
5	1	5	Andrey Minakov	ROC	51.11	Q
6	1	6	Matthew Temple	Australia	51.12	Q
7	2	5	Jakub Majerski	Poland	51.24	Q
8	2	6	Luis Martínez	Guatemala	51.30	Q
9	1	2	Mehdy Metella	France	51.32	
10	1	7	Naoki Mizunuma	Japan	51.46	
11	2	2	Joshua Liendo	Canada	51.50	
12	2	7	Nyls Korstanje	Netherlands	51.80	
13	1	8	Sun Jiajun	China	51.82	
14	2	8	Szebasztián Szabó	Hungary	51.89	
15	2	1	Tom Shields	United States	51.99	
16	1	1	Youssef Ramadan	Egypt	52.27	

=== Final ===
Rank	Lane	Swimmer	Nation	Time	Notes
1st place, gold medalist(s)	4	Caeleb Dressel	United States	49.45	WR
2nd place, silver medalist(s)	5	Kristóf Milák	Hungary	49.68	ER
3rd place, bronze medalist(s)	3	Noè Ponti	Switzerland	50.74	NR
4	2	Andrey Minakov	ROC	50.88	
5	1	Jakub Majerski	Poland	50.92	NR
5	7	Matthew Temple	Australia	50.92	
7	8	Luis Martínez	Guatemala	51.09	NR
8	6	Josif Miladinov	Bulgaria	51.49	
