= Charlie Swanson =

American swimmer (born 1998)

Personal information
- Full name: Charles August Swanson
- Born: February 20, 1998 (age 28) Richmond, Virginia, U.S.
- Height: 6 ft 3 in (191 cm)

Sport
- Sport: Swimming
- Strokes: Breaststroke, Individual medley
- Club: NOVA Aquatics, Richmond
- College team: University of Michigan
- Coach: Geoff Brown (NOVA); Mike Bottom (Michigan)
Medal record
Men's swimming
Representing United States
Olympic Games
| Gold medal – first place | 2024 Paris | 4×100 m mixed medley |
| Silver medal – second place | 2024 Paris | 4x100 m medley |
Pan American Games
| Gold medal – first place | 2019 Lima | 400 m medley |
| Gold medal – first place | 2019 Lima | 4×100 m mixed freestyle |
Junior Pan Pacific Championships
| Silver medal – second place | 2016 Maui | 400 m medley |
| Bronze medal – third place | 2016 Maui | 200 m medley |

Charles August Swanson (born February 20, 1998) is an American swimmer, who competed for the University of Michigan, and won a silver and a gold medal respectively in the Men's 4x100 meter medley and the Mixed 4x100 meter medley relay at the 2024 Paris Olympics. He won the gold medal in the men's 400 metre individual medley event at the 2019 Pan American Games held in Lima, Peru.

== Early life and swimming ==
Swanson was born February 20, 1998, in Richmond, Virginia, to father Bruce and mother Mary Scott Swanson, and attended Richmond's St. Christopher's School, a private preparatory school, where he graduated in 2016. At age 10 in 2008, Swanson swam for Richmond's Willow Oaks Country Club team, where he competed in the Richmond Metropolitan Aquatic League. By High School, Swanson swam for NOVA Aquatics of Virginia, a very strong program in Richmond, where he was trained and mentored by club founder and Head Coach Geoff Brown. Brown's year-round NOVA Aquatics program had participated in and had winners in state, national and international competitions. In February 2016, representing St. Christopher School, Swanson was a champion in a Virginia Independent Schools competition in the 200 Individual Medley with a time of 1:48.5, and a champion in the 500 freestyle with a time of 4:31.19. In Prep School era honors, in 2016 Swanson was a Virginia Swimmer of the Year as a Senior, and during high school was a Male Athlete of the Year for the Virginia Independent School Athletic Association.

From 2015-2017, Swanson swam for the U.S. Junior National Team. At the Junior Pan Pacific Swimming Championships in 2016 in Maui, he received a silver medal in the 400 meter medley and a bronze medal in the 200 meter medley.

== University of Michigan ==
He attended and swam for the University of Michigan from 2016-2020 under men's head coach Mike Bottom, who began coaching the Men's team in 2008. Swanson graduated Michigan in 2020 with a degree in Economics. Bottom had earlier served as a co-coach at the University of California with Hall of Fame coach Nort Thornton from 1997-2007, and would serve as an Assistant U.S. Olympic Coach in multiple Olympics. While at Michigan, Swanson was an All American in the 200 Breast, 200 IM, 400 IM, and 800 Free Relay, for a total of four American honors in 2020. During his collegiate swimming career, Swanson was a College Swimming and Diving Coaches Association of America (CSCAA) Honorable mention in three events in 2019. He was a Big Ten Champion five times from 2017-2020. In 2018, the CSCAA bestowed All American honors for his times in the 400 Individual Medley. In 2020, Swanson helped lead the Michigan swim team to the Big 10 team championship.

=== Olympic trials ===
Swanson qualified for both the 2016 and 2021 U.S. Olympic trials. In 2016, in Omaha, he made the trial finals, finishing seventh in the 400 meter Individual Medley, but failed to make the finals in the 200 meter medley and the 200 meter breaststroke. At the 2020 Olympic trials, Swanson competed in the breaststroke and individual medley, but did not make the finals, though he finished 9th in the semifinals of the 200 breaststroke, just missing the finals.

Around 2021, Swanson trained for a period in Austin at the University of Texas, later returning to train at the University of Michigan under Mat Bowe.

== 2024 Paris Olympic medals ==
At at the 2024 U.S. Olympic trials in Indianapolis, Swanson placed second in the finals of the 100-meter breaststroke with a personal best 59.16, qualifying for the U.S. team, and finishing only .08 seconds behind first place Nic Fink.

Later, at the August, 2024 Olympic games in Paris, Swanson first won a gold medal in the 4×100 m mixed medley, though he did not swim in the final. Swanson's breaststroke time in the preliminary heat of the mixed relay was 59.65 seconds, leading his team to a top qualifying time of 3:40.98. In the final of the 4 x 100 mixed medley relay swimmers Ryan Murphy swam backstroke, Nic Fink swam breaststroke, Gretchen Walsh swam butterfly and Torri Huske swam the anchor freestyle, finishing with a world record time of 3:37.43 to take gold in the event.

Swanson also won a silver in the Men's 4x100 m medley relay at the Paris 2024 Olympics.

In international competition, Swanson captured a gold medal in the men's 400 metre individual medley event at the 2019 Pan American Games held in Lima, Peru.
