= María Morales =

Maria Morales or María Morales may refer to:

- María Morales (triathlete) (born 1966), Colombian triathlete
- María Morales (actress) (born 1975), Spanish actress
- María Edith Morales Vargas (born 1996), Colombian footballer
- María Ester Alonzo Morales (born 1959), Mexican politician
- María Fernanda Morales (born 1970), Mexican voice actress
- María Luisa Morales (born 1954), Mexican gymnast
- María Luz Morales (1889–1980), Spanish film critic

== See also ==
- The Children of Maria Morales, 1952 Mexican film
