= Central American and Caribbean Swimming Championships =

Biennial aquatics championship

The CCCAN Championships are a biennial aquatics championship for countries in Central America and the Caribbean. The name of the event comes from the event's organizers: the Central American & Caribbean Swimming Confederation, whose abbreviated name is CCCAN.

The CCCAN Championships are held every odd year, and began in 1960. The 2013 CCCANs were originally awarded to Guatemala, however, in late 2012, the city announced it could not host the championships. In early 2013, San José, Costa Rica came forward to host the event.

In addition to CCCAN members, South American countries which border on the Caribbean have also participated in the championships, including Suriname, Colombia and Venezuela.

== Participating countries ==
Countries invited to participate at the 2013 championships are:

- 27 CCCAN members
- Colombia
- Suriname
- Venezuela
- Guadeloupe & Martinique (traditionally, these 2 oversees departments of France have competed as French team)

== Championships ==
Year	Edition	Host city	Host country	Events
1960	1	San Juan	Puerto Rico	40
1961	2	San Salvador	El Salvador	40
1963	3	Mexico City	Mexico	40
1965	4	Cali	Colombia	40
1968	5	San Salvador	El Salvador	40
1969	6	San Juan	Puerto Rico	40
1971	7	Havana	Cuba	40
1973	8	Ibagué	Colombia	40
1975	9	Mexico City	Mexico	40
1977	10	Santo Domingo	Dominican Republic	40
1979	11	San Cristobal	Venezuela	40
1981	12	Oaxtepec / Santo Domingo / Havana	Mexico / Dominican Republic / Cuba	40
1983	13	Santo Domingo	Dominican Republic	40
1985	14	Oaxtepec	Mexico	40
1987	15	Salinas	Puerto Rico	40
1989	16	Caracas	Venezuela	40
1991	17	Mérida	Mexico	40
1993	18	Havana	Cuba	40
1995	19	Guadalajara	Mexico	40
1997	20	Havana	Cuba	40
1999	21	Medellín	Colombia	40
2001	22	Santo Domingo / La Romana	Dominican Republic	40
2003	23	Mexico City	Mexico	40
2005	24	Santo Domingo / Santiago de los Caballeros	Dominican Republic	40
2007	25	San Salvador	El Salvador	40
2009	26	Barquisimeto	Venezuela	40
2011	27	Mayagüez	Puerto Rico	40
2013	28	San José	Costa Rica	40
2015	29	Bridgetown	Barbados	40
2017	30	Couva	Trinidad and Tobago	40
2018	31	Savaneta	Aruba	40
2019	32	Bridgetown / Havana	Barbados / Cuba	40
2021	33	San Juan	Puerto Rico	40
2022	34	Bridgetown	Barbados	40
2023	35	Santa Tecla	El Salvador	
2024	36	Monterrey	Mexico	

== See also ==
- List of Central American and Caribbean Championships records in swimming
- Central American and Caribbean Games
- South American Swimming Championships
- Pan Pacific Swimming Championships
