= Swimming at the 2010 South American Games – Women's 400 metre individual medley =

The Women's 400m individual medley event at the 2010 South American Games was held on March 27, with the heats at 11:22 and the Final at 18:30.

== Medalists ==
Gold	Silver	Bronze
Joanna Maranhão; Brazil	Larissa Cieslak; Brazil	Samantha Arévalo; Ecuador

== Records ==
Standing records prior to the 2010 South American Games
World record	Stephanie Rice (AUS)	4:29.45	Beijing, China	10 August 2008
Competition Record	Georgina Bardach (ARG)	4:53.42	Buenos Aires, Argentina	16 November 2006
South American record	Georgina Bardach (ARG)	4:37.51	Athens, Greece	14 August 2004

== Results ==
=== Heats ===
Rank	Heat	Lane	Athlete	Result	Notes
1	2	4	Joanna Maranhão (BRA)	5:01.55	Q
2	2	7	Samantha Arévalo (ECU)	5:11.33	Q
3	2	5	Julia Arino (ARG)	5:11.35	Q
4	1	4	Virginia Bardach (ARG)	5:13.49	Q
5	2	2	Patricia Mariana San Martin (PER)	5:13.93	Q
6	1	33	Erika Stewart (COL)	5:14.86	Q
7	1	6	Maria Alejandra Perez (PER)	5:15.10	Q
8	1	5	Larissa Cieslak (BRA)	5:15.15	Q
9	2	3	Eliana Barrios (VEN)	5:16.833	
10	1	2	Daniela Reyes (CHI)	5:18.43	
11	2	6	Carolina Restrepo (COL)	5:25.55	
12	2	1	Daniella van den Berg (ARU)	5:28.48	
13	1	7	Carla Silvana Torres (ECU)	5:33.51	
14	1	1	Karlene van der Jagt (SUR)	5:44.14	

=== Final ===
Rank	Lane	Athlete	Result	Notes
1st place, gold medalist(s)	4	Joanna Maranhão (BRA)	4:52.84	CR
2nd place, silver medalist(s)	8	Larissa Cieslak (BRA)	5:01.58	
3rd place, bronze medalist(s)	5	Samantha Arévalo (ECU)	5:03.77	
4	6	Virginia Bardach (ARG)	5:07.75	
5	1	Maria Alejandra Perez (PER)	5:11.46	
6	3	Julia Arino (ARG)	5:13.09	
7	7	Erika Stewart (COL)	5:14.94	
8	2	Patricia Mariana San Martin (PER)	5:15.76	
