= Amanda Alfaro =

Costa Rican swimmer (born 2001)

Personal information
- Born: 2 January 2001 (age 25)

Sport
- Sport: Swimming

Amanda Alfaro (born 2 January 2001) is a Costa Rican swimmer. She represented Costa Rica at the 2019 World Aquatics Championships held in Gwangju, South Korea. She competed in the women's 200 metre freestyle and women's 400 metre freestyle events. In the 200 metre event she did not advance to compete in the semi-finals and in the 400 metre event she did not advance to compete in the final.
