= Central American and Caribbean Swimming Federation =

International swimming body

CCCAN (pronounced C-C-Can) is the Central American and Caribbean Swimming Federation (in Spanish: la Confederación Centroamericana y del Caribe de Natación). It is the body that organizes and overseas aquatic sports competitions in the Caribbean and Central American region. It is a member organization of UANA and affiliated to FINA.

== Members ==
- Antigua and Barbuda
- Aruba
- Bahamas
- Barbados
- Bermuda
- British Virgin Islands
- Cayman Islands
- Costa Rica
- Cuba
- Curaçao
- Dominica
- Dominican Republic
- El Salvador
- Grenada
- Guatemala
- Haiti
- Honduras
- Jamaica
- Mexico
- Nicaragua
- Panama
- Puerto Rico
- Saint Kitts and Nevis
- Saint Lucia
- Saint Vincent and the Grenadines
- Trinidad and Tobago
- Turks and Caicos Islands
- (United States Virgin Islands) Virgin Islands

== Competitions ==
CCCAN oversees the following competitions:

- The Central American and Caribbean Swimming Championships (known as "CCCAN"s), held in odd years. The most recent Swimming competition was in June 2015 in Bridgetown, Barbados. CCCAN competitions in Water Polo and Synchronized Swimming are scheduled for June and July 2016.
- The Caribbean Island Swimming Championships (CISCs), in even years. This will be held at the end of June 2016 in Nassau, Bahamas.
- CAMEX, an age-group championship featuring Central American and Mexico, held in even years. This was most recently held in June 2016 in Panama City, Panama.
