= Alicia Mancilla =

Guatemalan swimmer (born 1999)

Personal information
- Born: 28 November 1999 (age 26)

Sport
- Sport: Swimming

Alicia Mancilla (born 28 November 1999) is a Guatemalan swimmer. She competed in the women's 1500 metre freestyle event at the 2017 World Aquatics Championships. She attended Gulliver Prep in Miami, Florida during her high school years.
