= María Far Núñez =

Panamanian swimmer (born 1998)

Personal information
- Born: January 6, 1998 (age 28)

Sport
- Sport: Swimming
- Strokes: Butterfly

María Far Núñez (born January 6, 1998) is a Panamanian swimmer. She competed at the 2016 Summer Olympics in the women's 200 metre butterfly event; her time of 2:23.89 in the heats did not qualify her for the semifinals.
