= Kevin Avila Soto =

Guatemalan swimmer (born 1992)

Personal information
- Born: December 22, 1992 (age 33) Santa Catarina Pinula, Guatemala

Sport
- Sport: Swimming
- Club: Club Delfine de Natacion

Kevin Avila Soto (born 22 December 1992) is a Guatemalan swimmer. At the 2012 Summer Olympics, he competed in the Men's 100 metre freestyle, finishing in 37th place overall in the heats, failing to qualify for the semifinals. Soto also competed in the 100 m event at the 2013 World Aquatics Championships. He swims for the Guatemalan club named "Club Delfines de Natación" and his coach is Morgan Armando Sanchez.
