= Tyler Christianson =

Panamanian swimmer (born 2001)

Personal information
- Full name: Bernhard Tyler Christianson
- Nationality: Panamanian
- Born: 9 December 2001 (age 24) New Jersey, U.S.

Sport
- Sport: Swimming
- College team: Notre Dame

Bernhard Tyler Christianson (born 9 December 2001) is a Panamanian swimmer. He competed in the men's 200 metre breaststroke and in the men's 200 metre individual medley event at the 2020 Summer Olympics.

== Personal life ==
Christianson was born in the United States, and is of Panamanian descent through his mother.
