= Luis Martínez (swimmer) =

Guatemalan swimmer (born 1995)

Personal information
- Full name: Luis Carlos Martínez Méndez
- Born: 11 December 1995 (age 30) Guatemala City, Guatemala
- Height: 1.83 m (6 ft 0 in)
- Weight: 70 kg (154 lb)

Sport
- Sport: Swimming
- Strokes: Butterfly, freestyle
- College team: Auburn University
Medal record
Men's swimming
Representing Guatemala
Pan American Games
| Silver medal – second place | 2019 Lima | 100 m butterfly |
Central American and Caribbean Games
| Gold medal – first place | 2018 Barranquilla | 100 m butterfly |
| Silver medal – second place | 2014 Veracruz | 50 m butterfly |
| Silver medal – second place | 2014 Veracruz | 100 m butterfly |
| Silver medal – second place | 2018 Barranquilla | 50 m butterfly |
Central American Games
| Gold medal – first place | 2017 Managua | 100 m freestyle |
| Gold medal – first place | 2017 Managua | 50 m backstroke |
| Gold medal – first place | 2017 Managua | 50 m butterfly |
| Gold medal – first place | 2017 Managua | 100 m butterfly |
| Gold medal – first place | 2017 Managua | 200 m butterfly |
| Gold medal – first place | 2017 Managua | 4×200 m freestyle |
| Silver medal – second place | 2017 Managua | 50 m freestyle |

Luis Carlos Martínez Méndez (born 11 December 1995) is a Guatemalan swimmer. He has competed in two Olympic Games: the 2016 Summer Olympics in Rio de Janeiro, Brazil, and the 2020 Summer Olympics in Tokyo, Japan.

== Career ==
=== College ===
Martínez attended Auburn University from 2014 to 2018, where he was part of the Auburn Tigers swimming and diving program. He was a three-time NCAA All-American.

=== Professional career ===
Martínez competed at the 2016 Summer Olympics in the men's 100 metre butterfly event; his time of 52.22 seconds finished him 19th in the heats but did not qualify him for the semifinals.

The next year, he competed in the butterfly events at the 2017 World Aquatics Championships, representing Guatemala.

At the 2019 Pan American Games in Lima, Peru, Martínez won the silver medal in the 100 meters butterfly, imposing a new games record in the preliminary heats.

In 2020, he won first place in the 100 meters butterfly at the U.S. Open Swimming Championships. By qualifying for the men's 100 metre butterfly at the 2020 Summer Olympics, Martínez became the first Guatemalan to reach a final in any swimming event; he eventually finished seventh, with a time of 51.29 seconds.
