= Helena Moreno (swimmer) =

Costa Rican swimmer (born 2001)

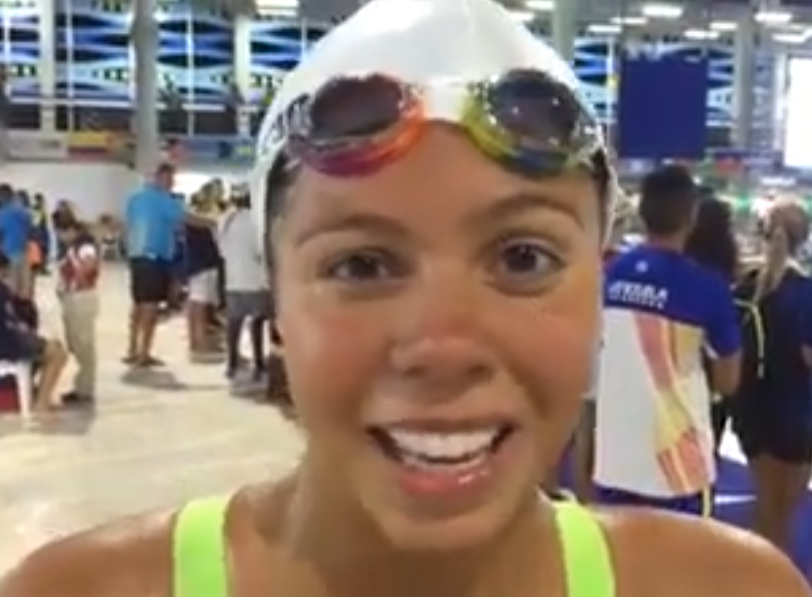
- In a 2018 interview

Personal information
- Born: 2 January 2001 (age 25)

Sport
- Sport: Swimming
Medal record
Representing Costa Rica
Central American and Caribbean Games
Bronze medal – third place	2018 Barranquilla	400m freestyle
Bronze medal – third place	2018 Barranquilla	800m freestyle

Helena Moreno (born 2 January 2001) is a Costa Rican swimmer. She competed in the women's 200 metre freestyle event at the 2017 World Aquatics Championships.
