= Beatriz Padrón =

Costa Rican swimmer (born 2003)

Personal information
- Full name: María Beatriz Padrón Salazar
- Born: April 5, 2003 (age 23)

Sport
- Sport: Swimming

María Beatriz Padrón Salazar (Note: In this Spanish name, the first or paternal surname is Padrón and the second or maternal family name is Salazar.) (born 5 April 2003) is a Costa Rican swimmer who competed in the 200 meter freestyle event at the 2020 Summer Olympics. She also competed at the 2018 Summer Youth Olympics in the 100 meter freestyle, 50 meter butterfly, and 100 meter butterfly.
