= Édgar Crespo =

Panamanian swimmer

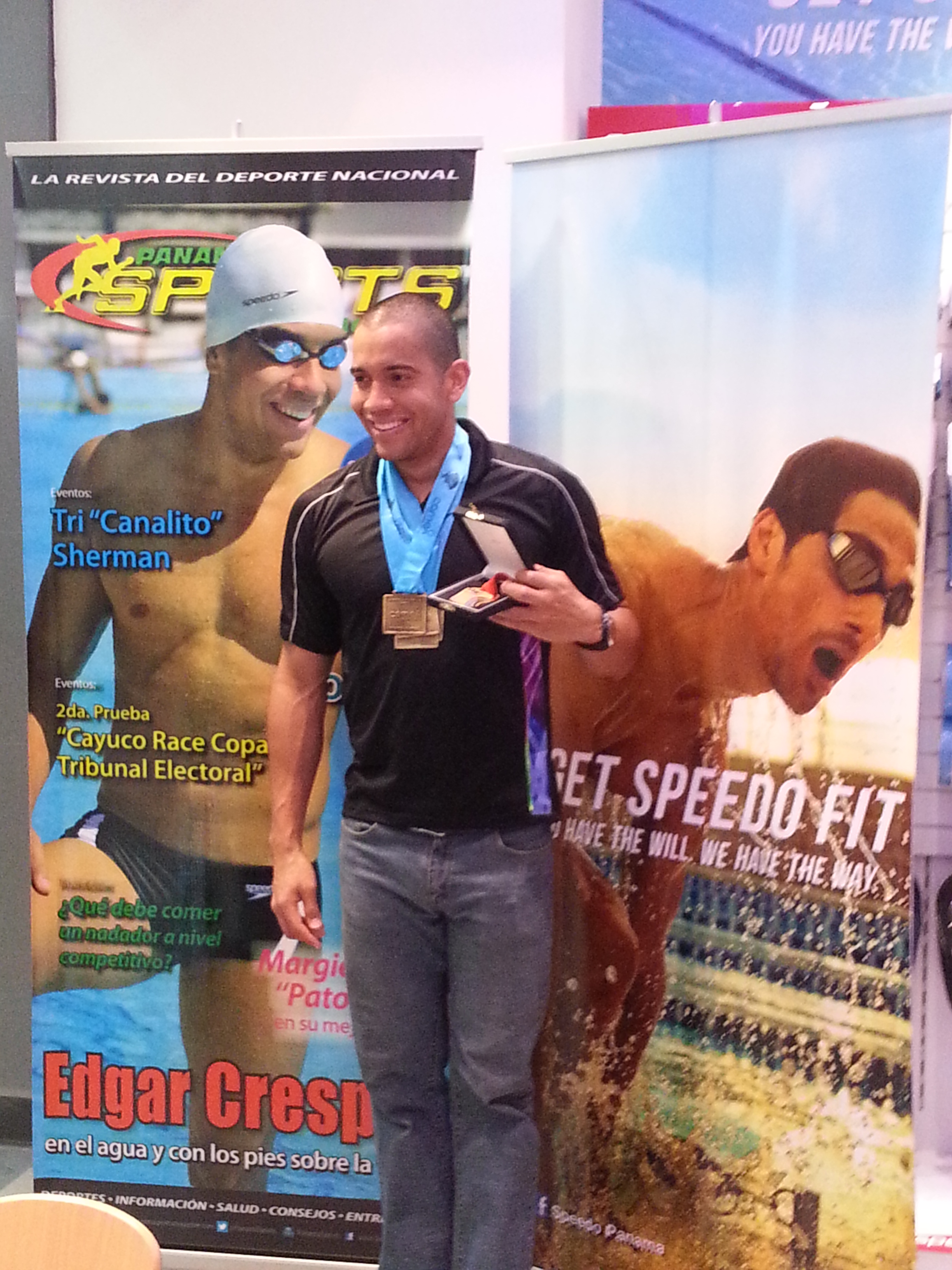

Personal information
- Born: Edgar Roberto Crespo Echeverría; 11 May 1989 (age 37) Panama City, Panama
- Height: 1.80 m (5 ft 11 in)
- Weight: 81.6 kg (180 lb)

Sport
- Country: Panama
- Sport: Swimming

Achievements and titles
- World finals: 2006 FINA Youth World Swimming Championship
- Regional finals: Bolivarian Games, Central American Games, Central American and Caribbean Games, South American Championship, South American Games, Pan American Games
Medal record
Representing Panama
Junior World Championships
Bronze medal – third place	2006 Rio de Janeiro	50 m breaststroke
South American Games
Silver medal – second place	2006 Buenos Aires	50 m breaststroke
Bronze medal – third place	2014 Santiago	100 m breaststroke
Central American and Caribbean Games
Bronze medal – third place	2006 Cartagena	50 m breaststroke
Gold medal – first place	2010 Mayagüez	50 m breaststroke
Gold medal – first place	2010 Mayagüez	100 m breaststroke
Silver medal – second place	2010 Mayagüez	200 m breaststroke
Silver medal – second place	2014 Veracruz	50 m breaststroke
Bronze medal – third place	2014 Veracruz	100 m breaststroke
Gold medal – first place	2018 Barranquilla	50 m breaststroke
Bolivarian Games
Gold medal – first place	2009 Sucre	50 m breaststroke
Silver medal – second place	2009 Sucre	100 m breaststroke
Gold medal – first place	2013 Trujillo	50 m breaststroke
Silver medal – second place	2013 Trujillo	100 m breaststroke
Silver medal – second place	2013 Trujillo	200 m breaststroke
Bronze medal – third place	2017 Santa Marta	100 m breaststroke
Central American Games
Gold medal – first place	2006 Panama	100 m breaststroke
Silver medal – second place	2006 Panama	100 m butterfly
Silver medal – second place	2006 Panama	100 m freestyle
Silver medal – second place	2006 Panama	4×100 m freestyle relay
Silver medal – second place	2006 Panama	4×100 m medley relay
Gold medal – first place	2010 Panama	50 m breaststroke
Gold medal – first place	2010 Panama	100 m breaststroke
Gold medal – first place	2010 Panama	200 m breaststroke
Gold medal – first place	2010 Panama	50 m butterfly
Gold medal – first place	2010 Panama	100 m butterfly
Gold medal – first place	2010 Panama	4×200 m freestyle relay
Gold medal – first place	2010 Panama	4×100 m freestyle relay
Silver medal – second place	2010 Panama	4×100 m medley relay
Gold medal – first place	2013 San Jose	50 m breaststroke
Gold medal – first place	2013 San Jose	100 m breaststroke
Gold medal – first place	2013 San Jose	200 m breaststroke
Gold medal – first place	2013 San Jose	200 m individual medley
Gold medal – first place	2013 San Jose	4×100 m freestyle relay
Gold medal – first place	2013 San Jose	4×100 m medley relay
Gold medal – first place	2017 Managua	50 m breaststroke
Gold medal – first place	2017 Managua	100 m breaststroke
Gold medal – first place	2017 Managua	200 m breaststroke
Gold medal – first place	2017 Managua	4×100 m medley relay
Bronze medal – third place	2017 Managua	50 m butterfly
Bronze medal – third place	2017 Managua	100 m butterfly

Edgar Roberto Crespo Echeverría (born 11 May 1989 in Panama City, Panama) is a Panamanian swimmer, who has been representing Panama in swimming competitions around the world.

== Studies at Texas Christian University ==
Edgar Crespo was a top swimmer at the college level. He received a scholarship as student/athlete to Texas Christian University. While he was in college he competed in events for both the university and his country. He graduated with a Bachelor of Business Administration (International Marketing and Entrepreneurship Management).

=== Season 2008–2009 ===
During this season he stopped competing in college level swim meets in order to focus on his studies but did represent his county in meets from August 2008 to July 2009.

=== Season 2009–2010 ===
This season was his first year as an official swimmer at Texas Christian University (TCU). During the season, Crespo did not lose any of his individual races (14 - 0) in the 100 and 200 yards breaststroke. He went undefeated against the universities of Utah, BYU, Air Force, UCSD, and UNLV. He won two (2) TCU Weekly Award (Prix Week TCU) on 23 October 2009 and 12 January 2010 for his performances during competitions with the team. Also on 10 November 2009 and 9 February 2010, Crespo was recognized as Best Swimmer of the Week of the Mountain West Conference (MWC) for his performance. On 6 February 2010, Crespo broke the 100 yards breaststroke record of the All-American, Jason Flint (who set a time of 55.24 in 1996) at the TCU vs. UNLV swim meet, held at the TCU Recreation Center. Crespo's new record time was 55.01. On 26 February 2010, Crespo became Champion of the Mountain West Conference (MWC Championship) in the 100 yards breaststroke (53.32), setting a record for TCU. This gold medal represented the seventh (7th) medal won by an athlete in swimming since TCU joined the Mountain West Conference (MWC) in the 2005–2006 season. He competed in the 4 x 50 yards and 4 × 100 yards medleys, TCU finished second in both races. He also competed in the 200 yards breaststroke finishing seventh in the finals of that event, and sixth in the 100 yards butterfly. On 1 March 2010, he received a mentioned as an All-MWC from the Mountain West Conference (MWC) in the 100 butterfly and 100 yards breaststroke. With his time of 53.32 in the 100-yard breaststroke, Crespo was selected to participate and represent Texas Christian University at the 2010 NCAA National Championships (2010 NCAA Championship) in Columbus, Ohio. He became only the second TCU athlete since 1997 to participate in the National Championships. In this championship, Crespo placed 27th in the United States in the 100 yards breaststroke.

=== Season 2010–2011 ===
During this season, he focused more on the 100 and 200 yards breaststroke. Crespo had a record of nine won and one lost. He led the swim team of Texas Christian University (TCU) in won races (9 individually). On 11 January 2011, Crespo was named TCU Athlete of the Week for his performance (he won the 100 and 200 yards breaststroke) in a competition against UNLV in Las Vegas. On 25 February 2011, he placed second in the Mountain West Conference Championship with a time of 53.35 in the 100 yards breaststroke. He helped TCU finish second in the 4 x 50 yards and 4×100 yards medleys. He also competed in the 200 yards breaststroke, finishing fourth place with a time of 1:58.60, breaking the record of Jason Flint (1:59.45) which was set in 1996. On 1 March 2011, he was recognized by the Mountain West Conference as an All-MWC in the 100 yards and 200 yards breaststroke as well as in the 4×50 yards and 4×100 yards medleys. On 10 March 2011, Crespo was selected, for the second time, to participate and represent Texas Christian University at the 2011 NCAA National Swimming Championships in Minnesota, Minneapolis. At this championship, Crespo placed 20th in the 100-yard breaststroke (with a time of 53.50) and 30th in the 200 yards breaststroke (with a time of 1:57.91 - breaking his own record set during Mountain West Conference Championship) in the United States.

=== Season 2011–2012 ===
This season was his last one as swimmer for Texas Christian University. During this season, Crespo did not lose any of his individual races in 100 and 200 yards breaststroke. He went undefeated against universities such as Notre Dame, Michigan, Wyoming, SMU, and UCSD. He achieved two TCU Athlete of the Week awards on 19 October 2011 and 25 January 2012 for his performances during competitions with the team. Also on 1 February 2012, Crespo was recognized by TCU as Scholar-Athlete (student-athlete) of January at Texas Christian University. This award was given for his performance in school and in his sport. 15 February 2012, was Crespo's last meet as an athlete of Texas Christian University in the Conference USA Championship. He achieved first place in the 100 yards breaststroke, breaking his record of 53.26 that was established in 2010. He also won the 200 yards breaststroke, beating his own record of 1:56.30 that was established in 2011. Crespo also achieved silver medals in the 4 x 50 and 4×100 yards medleys (both in new TCU record). He also won a bronze medal in the 200-yard individual medley with a time of 1:50.06. Edgar Crespo was selected as Swimmer of the Meet at C-USA (Swimmer Conference USA Championship) for his performance during the event.

== World Swimming Championships ==
=== 2006 FINA Youth World Swimming Championships ===
Aged 16, Crespo took part in the 2006 FINA Youth World Swimming Championships held in Rio de Janeiro, Brazil. He won a bronze medal, the first medal every won by Panama at the Youth World Swimming Championships.

- Bronze medal: 50 m breaststroke

== Regional Games ==
Crespo has participated in different regional games, such as: Bolivarian Games, Central American Games, Central American and Caribbean Games, South American Games and Pan American Games.

== Bolivarian Games ==
Crespo represented Panama in four (4) consecutive Bolivarian Games, winning two gold, three silver medals and one bronze medal. He broke the Bolivarian record in the 50 m breaststroke at two different Bolivarian Games.

=== 2005 Bolivarian Games ===
He placed 6th in the 100 m breaststroke and 7th in the 100 m butterfly during the 2005 Bolivarian Games which were held in Pereira, Colombia.

=== 2009 Bolivarian Games ===
At the 2009 Bolivarian Games, Crespo was the bearer of the delegation that represented Panama.

During these Bolivarian Games held in Sucre, Bolivia, Crespo won 2 medals: 1 gold medal in the 50 m breaststroke and 1 silver medal in the 100 m breaststroke. Also, he placed 6th in the 200 m breaststroke. During the competition, he broke a record in the 50 m breaststroke.

- Gold Medal: 50 m breaststroke (Bolivarian Games Record)
- Silver Medal: 100 m breaststroke

=== 2013 Bolivarian Games ===
Again, Crespo was bearer of the delegation that represented Panama during the 2013 Bolivarian Games held in Trujillo, Peru.

Crespo won 3 medals: 1 gold medal in the 50 m breaststroke and 2 silver medals in the 100 m and 200 m breaststroke. During the competition, he broke his own record in the 50 m breaststroke which he set in the last Bolivarian Games.

- Gold medal: 50 m breaststroke (Bolivarian Games Record)
- Silver medal : 100 m breaststroke
- Silver medal : 200 m breaststroke

=== 2017 Bolivarian Games ===
For the fourth time in a row, Crespo represented Panama in the Bolivarian Games.

In this event held in Santa Marta, Colombia, he earned 1 bronze medal in the 100m Breaststroke and a 5th place in the 200m Breaststroke.

- Bronze Medal: 100 m breaststroke

== Central American Games ==
Crespo has participated in four (4) different editions of the Central American Games. He has won multiple medals in different events: 14 gold medals and 5 silver medals, a total of 19 medals in 3 different Central American Games. Since his first appearance at the age of 16 years, he has been undefeated in the 50 m, 100 m and 200 m breaststroke.

=== 2006 Central American Games Panama 2006 ===
2006 was the first time he participated in the Central American Games held in Panama City, Panama. Crespo won 5 medals: 1 gold and 4 silver medals.

- Gold Medal: 100 m breaststroke
- Silver Medal: 100 m butterfly
- Silver Medal: 100 m freestyle
- Silver Medal: 4 × 100 m freestyle relay
- Silver Medal: 4 × 100 m medley relay

=== 2010 Central American Games Panama 2010 ===
In 2010, Crespo participated in his second Central American Games held in Panama City, Panama. Crespo took part in 8 different events, winning 7 gold medals and 1 silver medal. He broke multiple records during this competition, including the 50 m and 100 m breaststroke, the 50 m and 100 m butterfly, and the 4 × 100 m medley relay.

- Gold Medal: 50 m breaststroke (Central American Games Record)
- Gold Medal: 100 m breaststroke (Central American Games Record)
- Gold Medal: 200 m breaststroke
- Gold Medal: 50 m butterfly (Central American Games Record)
- Gold Medal: 100 m butterfly
- Gold Medal: 4 × 100 m freestyle relay
- Gold Medal: 4 × 100 m medley relay (Central American Games Record)
- Silver Medal: 4 × 200 m freestyle relay

=== 2013 Central American Sports Games San Jose 2013 ===
In his third appearance at the Central American Games held in San Jose, Costa Rica, Crespo won 6 gold medals. He broke several Central American records: 50 m, 100 m and 200 m breaststroke, and 200 m individual medley. He was appointed as the King of the 2013 Central American Games because he was the athlete with most medals won individually among all participants.

- Gold Medal: 50 m breaststroke (Central American Games Record)
- Gold Medal: 100 m breaststroke (Central American Games Record)
- Gold Medal: 200 m breaststroke (Central American Games Record)
- Gold Medal 200 m individual medley (Central American Games Record)
- Gold Medal: 4 × 100 m freestyle relay
- Gold Medal: 4 × 100 m medley relay

=== 2017 Central American Sports Games Managua 2017 ===
In his fourth appearance at the Central American Games held in Managua, Nicaragua, Crespo won 6 medals: 4 gold medals and 2 bronze medals. Also, he could broke two records of the event.

- Gold Medal: 50 m breaststroke (Central American Games Record)
- Gold Medal: 100 m breaststroke
- Gold Medal: 200 m breaststroke
- Gold Medal 4 × 100 m medley relay (Central American Games Record)
- Bronze medal: 50 m butterfly
- Bronze medal: 100 m butterfly

== Central American and Caribbean Games ==
Crespo participated in four (4) editions of the Central American and Caribbean Games and won three gold medals, two silver medal and two bronze medal.

=== Central American and Caribbean Games Cartagena de Indias 2006 ===
In 2006, Crespo participated in his first Central American and Caribbean Games held in Cartagena, Colombia. He won a 1 bronze medal in the 50 m breaststroke and placed 4th in the 100 m breaststroke. Crespo achieved a great accomplishment during this Games, winning Panama's first medal since 1990.

- Bronze Medal: 50 m breaststroke

=== Central American and Caribbean Games Mayagüez 2010 ===
During the edition of the Central American and Caribbean Games held in Mayagüez, Puerto Rico, Crespo achieved three medals: 2 gold medals, and 1 silver medal. He broke records in the 50 m and 100 m breaststroke. Crespo was also the athlete with the most medals for Panama at the Central American and Caribbean Games Mayagüez 2010.

His performance in the twenty-first edition of Central American and Caribbean Games lead him to be identified as the seventy-second athlete with the most medals among all participants of the event, with a total of 3 medals.

- Gold Medal: 50 m breaststroke (Record Central American and Caribbean Games)
- Gold Medal: 100 m breaststroke (Record Central American and Caribbean Games)
- Silver Medal: 200 m breaststroke

=== Central American and Caribbean Games Veracruz 2014 ===
During the edition of the Central American and Caribbean Games held in Veracruz, Mexico, Crespo achieved two medals: 1 silver medal, and 1 bronze medal. During the first day of competition, Crespo won the bronze medal in the 100m breaststroke. Crespo then swam the 50m breaststroke, breaking his own record from the 2010 Games in the preliminary round. During the final of the 50m breaststroke, he made a mistake, putting him into second place.

- Silver Medal: 50 m breaststroke (Record Central American and Caribbean Games in preliminary round)
- Bronze Medal: 100 m breaststroke

=== Central American and Caribbean Games Barranquilla 2018 ===
During the edition of the Central American and Caribbean Games held in Barranquilla, Colombia, Crespo achieved one gold medals and the Central American and Caribbean Games Record in the 50m breaststroke. Also, Crespo placed sixth in the 100 m breaststroke.

- Gold Medal: 50 m breaststroke (Record Central American and Caribbean Games)

== South American Games ==
Crespo participated in three (3) editions of the South American Games (ODESUR). He won two medals: one silver in 2006 edition, and one bronze in the 2014 edition

=== South American Games Buenos Aires 2006 ===
At just 16 years, Crespo participated in his first South American Games (ODESUR) held in Buenos Aires, Argentina winning a silver medal in the 50 m breaststroke.

- Silver Medal: 50 m breaststroke

=== South American Games Santiago 2014 ===
Crespo returned to the South American Games after 8 years. He won the bronze medal in the 100 m breaststroke

- Bronze Medal: 100 m breaststroke

=== South American Games Cochabamba 2018 ===
Crespo returned to the South American Games in Cochabamba 2018. He placed fourth in the 100 m breaststroke and fifth in the 200 m breaststroke.

== Pan American Games ==
Crespo has represented Panama in (4) four consecutives Pan American Games.

=== Pan American Games Rio de Janeiro 2007 ===
Crespo participated in his first Pan American Games held in Rio de Janeiro, Brazil at the age of 18. He placed 13th in the 100 m breaststroke and 12th in the 200 m breaststroke.

=== Pan American Games Guadalajara 2011 ===
Crespo returned to compete in the 2011 Pan American Games, which this time was held in Guadalajara, Mexico. Again, he competed in the 100 m breaststroke and 200 m breaststroke. In the 100 m breaststroke, Crespo placed 5th place in the Americas. In the 200 m breaststroke, he placed 9th.

=== Pan American Games Toronto 2015 ===
Edgar Crespo returned to compete in the 2015 Pan American Games, held in Toronto, Canada. He was chosen as the flag barrier of the delegation by the Panama Olympic Committee. This edition of the PanAm Games, he just competed in the 100m breaststroke. Crespo placed 8th in the final of this event. After this competition, many newspapers in Panama criticized his performance. However, the Panamanian singer, Rubén Blades, praised him on his official Facebook page and criticized the negative responses of different newspapers in Panama. Hours later, Crespo replied to Rubén Blades, via his social media accounts.

=== Pan American Games Lima 2019 ===
Crespo returned to compete in the 2019 Pan American Games, which this time was held in Lima, Peru. Again, he competed in the 100 m breaststroke and 200 m breaststroke. In the 100 m breaststroke, Crespo placed 11th place (3rd in the final B - final do not receive medal) in the Americas for the 100 m breaststroke and 13th (5th in the final B - final do not receive medal) in the 200m breaststroke.

== Summer Olympic Games ==
Crespo has competed and represented Panama in three (3) consecutive Summer Olympic Games:

=== 2008 Summer Olympics ===
Edgar Crespo participated in his first 2008 Summer Olympics, held in Beijing, China. He qualified at 19 years old as a wild card and competed in the 100 m breaststroke. He participated in the 3rd heat, which he won, becoming the second Panamanian to accomplish this. However he did not qualify for the semi-finals and placed 53rd overall.

=== 2012 Summer Olympics ===
At 24 years old, Crespo represented Panama in his second Summer Olympic Games, held in London, England. Just like in the last Olympics, Crespo experienced qualifying problems. During the World Swimming Championships 2011 held in Shanghai, China, Crespo achieved the B standard time in the 100 m breaststroke. Also during the Indy Grand Prix swimming competition held in Indianapolis, United States, Crespo got the B standard time in the 200 m breaststroke. Approaching the starting date of the 2012 Summer Olympics, the International Swimming Federation (FINA) did not send the invitations to Panama since the Panamanian Federation Swimming (FPN) decided not to use the wild card that allowed the two athletes per country: male and female, to compete regardless if they achieved or did not achieve the A standard times. The Panamanian Federation preferred to go by B standard invitation. This news became sport controversy in Panama because other countries had athletes with B standard times and those countries secured their participation in the games with the wild card. After several weeks of waiting and 2 weeks before the start of the games in London, the Panama Olympic Committee (COP) received the wild card for Crespo to compete in the 100 m breaststroke. He competed in London 2012 in the 4th heat of the 100 m breaststroke and placed 35th in the overall ranking.

=== 2016 Summer Olympics ===
For the third time in a row, at 27, Edgar Crespo represented Panama in the Summer Olympic Games, this time in Rio de Janeiro, Brazil. Crespo achieved the B time in the 100 meters breaststroke at the Stockholm Swim Open, a competition held in Sweden in March 2016. This B time kept Crespo in the World Ranking to be invited by the International Swimming Federation (FINA) and qualify for Rio 2016. On 6 August, Edgar Crespo competed the 100 meters breaststroke in the 2nd heat finishing in 41st place overall.
