= Valerie Gruest =

Guatemalan swimmer (born 1999)

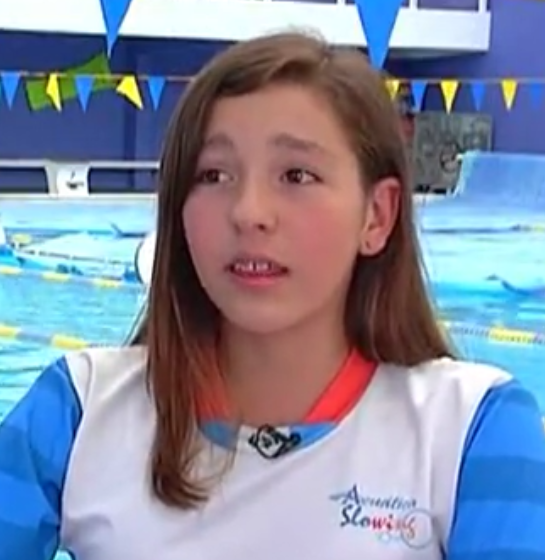
- Gruest in 2012

Personal information
- Full name: Valerie Gruest
- Nationality: Guatemalan
- Born: 14 March 1999 (age 27)
- Height: 1.72 m (5 ft 8 in)
- Weight: 63 kg (139 lb)

Sport
- Sport: Swimming

Valerie Gruest (born 14 March 1999) is a Guatemalan swimmer who competed at the 2016 Summer Olympics.

== Biography ==
Gruest was born on 14 March 1999. She took four national swimming records before she joined Northwestern University in Illinois in 2015. The Sports Writers’ Association of Guatemala voted her "Rookie Athlete" of the year.

Gruest competed in the women's 400 metre freestyle and 800m freestyle events at the 2016 Summer Olympics.
