= Isaac Beitia =

Panamanian swimmer (born 1995)

Personal information
- Born: 8 August 1995 (age 30)

Sport
- Sport: Swimming
- Strokes: Freestyle

Isaac Beitia (born 8 August 1995) is a Panamanian swimmer. He represented Panama at the 2019 World Aquatics Championships held in Gwangju, South Korea and he finished in 63rd place in the heats in the men's 50 metre freestyle event. In the men's 100 metre freestyle he finished in 58th place in the heats.

He also represented Panama at the 2019 Pan American Games held in Lima, Peru.
