= List of Dominican Republic records in swimming =

This is a list of national swimming records for the Dominican Republic. These are the fastest times ever swum by a swimmer representing the country.

These records are kept/maintained by the Dominican Republic's national swimming federation: Federación Dominicana de Natación (FEDONA).

All records were set in finals unless noted otherwise.

== Long Course (50 m) ==
=== Men ===
Event	Time		Name	Club	Date	Meet	Location	Ref
50 m freestyle	22.31	h	Jacinto Ayala	Dominican Republic	31 July 2009	World Championships	Rome, Italy	
100 m freestyle	49.38	h	Jacinto Ayala	Dominican Republic	29 July 2009	World Championships	Rome, Italy	
200 m freestyle	1:53.02	h	Anthony Piñeiro	South Florida Stallions	2 May 2025	TYR Pro Swim Series	Fort Lauderdale, United States	
200 m freestyle	1:51.44	r, #	Anthony Piñeiro	Dominican Republic	28 July 2026	CAC Games	Santo Domingo, Dominican Republic	
400 m freestyle	3:59.29 (Note: by official result source; 3:59.17 by FEDONA source, a typo)	h	Nicholas Schwab	Dominican Republic	28 July 2013	World Championships	Barcelona, Spain	
800 m freestyle	8:36.26		Mauricio Arias	SinFallos	27 April 2024	Invitacional Internacional Marlins de AH	Santo Domingo, Dominican Republic	
1500 m freestyle	16:12.11		Cesar Peguero	Dominican Republic	September 1994	World Championships	Rome, Italy	
50 m backstroke	26.58	h	Anthony Piñeiro	Dominican Republic	21 August 2025	World Junior Championships	Otopeni, Romania	
50 m backstroke	26.20	h, #	Anthony Piñeiro	Dominican Republic	30 July 2026	CAC Games	Santo Domingo, Dominican Republic	
100 m backstroke	56.87		Anthony Piñeiro	Eagle Aquatics	4 May 2024	TYR 18 and under Spring Cup	Fort Lauderdale, United States	
100 m backstroke	56.25	#	Anthony Piñeiro	Dominican Republic	31 July 2026	CAC Games	Santo Domingo, Dominican Republic	
200 m backstroke	2:02.97		Anthony Piñeiro	Eagle Aquatics	27 July 2024	Futures Championships	Austin, United States	
50 m breaststroke	27.70	h	Josué Domínguez	Dominican Republic	12 June 2024	Colombia Open Championships	Cartagena, Colombia	
100 m breaststroke	1:00.68		Josué Domínguez	Asociacion Nat. Santiago	16 April 2021	Dominican Republic International Open	Santo Domingo, Dominican Republic	
200 m breaststroke	2:15.14		Josué Domínguez	Asociacion Nat. Santiago	15 April 2021	Dominican Republic International Open	Santo Domingo, Dominican Republic	
50 m butterfly	24.38	h	Jacinto Ayala	Dominican Republic	26 July 2009	World Championships	Rome, Italy	
50 m butterfly	24.29	h, #	Javier Nuñez	Dominican Republic	15 May 2025	Pan American Championships	Medellín, Colombia	
100 m butterfly	55.31		Jacinto Ayala	Delfines del Naco	25 April 2006	-		
100 m butterfly	54.77	not ratified	Javier Nuñez	Dominican Republic	5 September 2023	World Junior Championships	Netanya, Israel	
100 m butterfly	54.25	'#'	Javier Nuñez	Dominican Republic	14 May 2025	Pan American Championships	Medellín, Colombia	
200 m butterfly	2:03.46		Brandon Vives	Metro Aquatic Club of Miami	28 July 2017	FGC Senior Championships	Coral Springs, United States	
200m individual medley	2:05.37		Jean Luis Gomez	Delfines del Naco	26 April 2014	Invitacional Internacional Marlins de AH	Santo Domingo, Dominican Republic	
400m individual medley	4:31.80		Nicholas Schwab	Indiana	12 July 2012	Speedo Championships	Orlando, United States	
4×50m freestyle relay	1:36.72		Jhonny Perez; Victor Rosa; Galvez Capriles; Dominguez	Dominican Republic	July 2014	Speedo Championships	Orlando, United States	
4×100m freestyle relay	3:27.04		Javier Núñez (51.25); Anthony Piñeiro (50.80); Cristian Ramos (52.36); Mauricio Arias (52.63)	Dominican Republic	10 August 2025	Junior Pan American Games	Asunción, Paraguay	
4×100m freestyle relay	3:23.11	#	Javier Núñez (50.04); Denzel Gonzalez (50.74); Mauricio Arias (51.95); Anthony Pineiro (50.38)	Dominican Republic	29 July 2026	CAC Games	Santo Domingo, Dominican Republic	
4×200m freestyle relay	7:51.80		Javier Núñez (1:56.41); Anthony Pineiro (1:57.93); Denzel Gonzalez (1:58.93); Mauricio Arias (1:58.53)	Dominican Republic	24 June 2023	CAC Games	San Salvador, El Salvador	
4×200m freestyle relay	7:34.90	#	Anthony Pineiro (1:51.44); Javier Núñez (1:50.61); Mauricio Arias (1:53.67); Fausto Bastardo (1:59.18)	Dominican Republic	28 July 2026	CAC Games	Santo Domingo, Dominican Republic	
4×50m medley relay	1:46.79		Jean Luis Gomez; Galvez Capriles; Cristopher Trinidad; Jhonny Perez	Dominican Republic	July 2014	Speedo Championships	Orlando, United States	
4×100m medley relay	3:48.58	h	Anthony Piñeiro (57.09); Pablo Solano (1:03.37); Javier Núñez (56.17); Cristian Ramos (51.95)	Dominican Republic	14 August 2025	Junior Pan American Games	Asunción, Paraguay	
4×100m medley relay	3:44.13	#	Anthony Piñeiro (56.50); Josué Domínguez (1:00.74); Javier Núñez (54.66); Denzel Gonzalez (52.33)	Dominican Republic	1 August 2026	CAC Games	Santo Domingo, Dominican Republic	

Legend: # – Record awaiting ratification by FEDONA; WR – World record; AM – Americas record;
Records not set in finals: h – heat; sf – semifinal; r – relay 1st leg; rh – relay heat 1st leg; b – B final; † – en route to final mark; so – swim-off; tt – time trial

=== Women ===
Event	Time		Name	Club	Date	Meet	Location	Ref
50m freestyle	25.89		Krystal Lara	Dominican Republic	5 July 2022	Bolivarian Games	Valledupar, Colombia	
100m freestyle	56.14		Krystal Lara	Dominican Republic	2 July 2022	Bolivarian Games	Valledupar, Colombia	
200m freestyle	2:01.21		Krystal Lara	Dominican Republic	3 July 2022	Bolivarian Games	Valledupar, Colombia	
400m freestyle	4:29.05		Elizabeth Jiménez	Marlins de Arroyo Hondo	28 April 2023	Invitacional Internacional Marlins de AH	Santo Domingo, Dominican Republic	
800m freestyle	9:26.18		Yubelkis Ramírez	Dominican Republic	July 2000	CISC	Oranjestad, Aruba	
1500m freestyle	18:11.99		Laura Hernadez	Asociacion Nat. Santiago	7 April 2024	Dominican Republic International Open	Santo Domingo, Dominican Republic	
50m backstroke	29.01		Krystal Lara	Dominican Republic	20 July 2018	CAC Games	Barranquilla, Colombia	
100m backstroke	1:01.39		Krystal Lara	Dominican Republic	21 July 2018	CAC Games	Barranquilla, Colombia	
200m backstroke	2:13.11		Krystal Lara	Dominican Republic	6 March 2020	TYR Pro Swim Series	Des Moines, United States	
50m breaststroke	32.78	h	Anabelle Pérez	PDR Swimming for Success	28 June 2026	Jeffery S Mace Summer Sizzle	Piscataway, United States	
50m breaststroke	32.59	#	Anabelle Pérez	Dominican Republic	29 July 2026	CAC Games	Santo Domingo, Dominican Republic	
100m breaststroke	1:13.41	h	Vanessa Rivas	Swim Florida	7 July 2017	Southern Zone South Sectional Championships	Orlando, United States	
100m breaststroke	1:13.40	#	Natalia Diaz	Dominican Republic	28 July 2026	CAC Games	Santo Domingo, Dominican Republic	
200m breaststroke	2:41.86		Vanessa Rivas	Swim Florida	9 July 2017	Southern Zone South Sectional Championships	Orlando, United States	
200m breaststroke	2:41.55	#	Natalia Diaz	Dominican Republic	31 July 2026	CAC Games	Santo Domingo, Dominican Republic	
50m butterfly	26.94		Jianna Amores	South Florida Stallions	4 June 2026	Speedo Sectionals	Ocala, United States	
50m butterfly	26.41	#	Jianna Amores	Dominican Republic	1 August 2026	CAC Games	Santo Domingo, Dominican Republic	
100m butterfly	59.97		Krystal Lara	Dominican Republic	4 July 2022	Bolivarian Games	Valledupar, Colombia	
100m butterfly	59.19	#	Jianna Amores	Dominican Republic	30 July 2026	CAC Games	Santo Domingo, Dominican Republic	
200m butterfly	2:13.82	h	Krystal Lara	Badger Swim Club	2 June 2022	TYR Pro Swim Series	Mission Viejo, United States	
200m individual medley	2:21.00		Jianna Amores	South Florida Stallions	6 June 2026	Speedo Sectionals	Ocala, United States	
400m individual medley	5:03.31		Elizabeth Jiménez	Marlins de Arroyo Hondo	27 April 2023	Invitacional Internacional Marlins de AH	Santo Domingo, Dominican Republic	
4×50m freestyle relay	2:01.63		Nayely Matos; Alicia Perez; Ianna Gomez; Karel Ramirez	Marlins de Arroyo Hondo	13 May 2018	Academia Acuatica		
4×100m freestyle relay	4:11.56	h		Dominican Republic	24 August 2019	World Junior Championships	Budapest, Hungary	
4×100m freestyle relay	3:54.06	#	Elizabeth Jiménez (57.56); Jenesys Amores (59.23); Antonella Aybar (1:00.09); Jianna Amores (57.18)	Dominican Republic	29 July 2026	CAC Games	Santo Domingo, Dominican Republic	
4×100m freestyle relay	4:07.61	not ratified	Maria Fernandez (1:04.47); Mariel Mencia (1:02.05); Wendry de la Rosa (1:02.37); Elizabeth Jimenez (58.72)	Dominican Republic	28 June 2023	CAC Games	San Salvador, El Salvador	
4×200m freestyle relay	9:04.02		Laura Rodríguez; Juana Santana; Eliana Disla; Karla Tejeda	Dominican Republic	18 July 2010	CAC Games	Mayagüez, Puerto Rico	
4×200m freestyle relay	8:33.98	#	Elizabeth Jiménez (2:06.73); Jianna Amores (2:09.69); Jenesys Amores (2:07.96); Antonella Aybar (2:09.60)	Dominican Republic	28 July 2026	CAC Games	Santo Domingo, Dominican Republic	
4×50m medley relay	2:20.97		García; Díaz; Mercedes Aybar; K. Guzmán	Naco	January 1986	-	Curaçao	
4×100m medley relay	4:37.78	h	Riley Pujadas; Alicia Bueno; Darielys Ortiz; Nayely Matos	Dominican Republic	25 August 2019	World Junior Championships	Budapest, Hungary	
4×100m medley relay	4:30.73	not ratified	Elizabeth Jiménez (1:05.29); Ianna Gomez (1:17.17); Maria Fernandez (1:07.21); Mariel Mencia (1:01.06)	Dominican Republic	29 June 2023	CAC Games	San Salvador, El Salvador	
4×100m medley relay	4:16.57	#	Elizabeth Jiménez (1:04.25); Natalia Diaz (1:13.18); Jianna Amores (1:00.20); Ambar Perez (58.94)	Dominican Republic	1 August 2026	CAC Games	Santo Domingo, Dominican Republic	

Legend: # – Record awaiting ratification by FEDONA; WR – World record; AM – Americas record;
Records not set in finals: h – heat; sf – semifinal; r – relay 1st leg; rh – relay heat 1st leg; b – B final; † – en route to final mark; so – swim-off; tt – time trial

=== Mixed relay ===
Event	Time		Name	Club	Date	Meet	Location	Ref
4×50m freestyle relay	1:44.04		Radhames Kalaff; Dorian McMenemy; Vanessa Rivas; Jean Luis Gómez	Dominican Republic	June 2015	CAC Championships	Bridgetown, Barbados	
4×100m freestyle relay	3:41.76 (Note: by official result source; 3:47.65 by FEDONA source, a typo)		Denzel Gonzalez (52.43); Krystal Lara (56.73); Elizabeth Jimenez (59.98); Robert Liz (52.62)	Dominican Republic	5 July 2022	Bolivarian Games	Valledupar, Colombia	
4×100m freestyle relay	3:35.45	#	Javier Núñez (50.50); Anthony Pineiro (50.34); Elizabeth Jimenez (57.48); Jianna Amores (57.13)	Dominican Republic	31 July 2026	CAC Games	Santo Domingo, Dominican Republic	
4×50m medley relay	1:59.90		Alejandra Santana; Defry Colon; Leticia Gonzalez; Rodrigo Leon	Delfines del Naco	26 November 2023	Delfines del Naco Invitational	Santo Domingo, Dominican Republic	
4×100m medley relay	3:59.11 (Note: by official result source; 4:04.53 by FEDONA source, a typo)		Elizabeth Jimenez (1:04.74); Josue Dominguez (1:01.85); Krystal Lara (1:00.90); Denzel Gonzalez (51.62)	Dominican Republic	5 July 2022	Bolivarian Games	Valledupar, Colombia	
4×100m medley relay	3:54.50	#	Elizabeth Jimenez (1:04.06); Josue Dominguez (1:01.49); Jianna Amores (59.06); Javier Núñez (49.89)	Dominican Republic	30 July 2026	CAC Games	Santo Domingo, Dominican Republic	

Legend: # – Record awaiting ratification by FEDONA; WR – World record; AM – Americas record;
Records not set in finals: h – heat; sf – semifinal; r – relay 1st leg; rh – relay heat 1st leg; b – B final; † – en route to final mark; so – swim-off; tt – time trial

== Short Course (25 m) ==
=== Men ===
Event	Time		Name	Club	Date	Meet	Location	Ref
50m freestyle	22.00		Jacinto Ayala	Naco	11 July 2009	Intramuros Naco		
100m freestyle	49.59	h	Denzel Gonzalez	Dominican Republic	14 December 2022	World Championships	Melbourne, Australia	
100m freestyle	49.03	h, #	Javier Nuñez	Dominican Republic	11 December 2024	World Championships	Budapest, Hungary	
200m freestyle	1:50.09		Javier Nuñez	SinFallos	10 December 2023	Festival Curso Corto Fedona	Santo Domingo, Dominican Republic	
400m freestyle	3:58.10		Mauricio Arias	SinFallos	24 February 2024	Nados Cortos Laces	Santiago de los Caballeros, Dominican Republic	
800m freestyle	8:33.04	†	Cesar Peguero	MAH	5 November 1993			
1500m freestyle	16:07.87		Cesar Peguero	MAH	5 November 1993			
50m backstroke	26.04	h	Jean Luis Apolinar Gomez Nuñez	Dominican Republic	14 December 2012	World Championships	Istanbul, Turkey	
100m backstroke	55.64	h	Jean Luis Apolinar Gomez Nuñez	Dominican Republic	12 December 2012	World Championships	Istanbul, Turkey	
200m backstroke	2:03.67	h	Jean Luis Apolinar Gomez Nuñez	Dominican Republic	16 December 2012	World Championships	Istanbul, Turkey	
50m breaststroke	26.91	h	Josue Dominguez Ramos	Dominican Republic	20 December 2021	World Championships	Abu Dhabi, United Arab Emirates	
100m breaststroke	58.44	h	Josue Dominguez Ramos	Dominican Republic	16 December 2021	World Championships	Abu Dhabi, United Arab Emirates	
200m breaststroke	2:11.71	h	Josue Dominguez Ramos	Dominican Republic	5 December 2014	World Championships	Doha, Qatar	
50m butterfly	24.28		Javier Nuñez	SinFallos	6 October 2024	Invitacional LAPIA	Santiago de los Caballeros, Dominican Republic	
100m butterfly	54.43	h	Denzel Gonzalez	Dominican Republic	17 December 2021	World Championships	Abu Dhabi, United Arab Emirates	
200m butterfly	2:01.91		Ronnie Benjamin	Paraiso	20 November 2011	Justas LAI		
100m individual medley	56.75	h	Josue Dominguez Ramos	Dominican Republic	6 December 2014	World Championships	Doha, Qatar	
200m individual medley	2:03.17	h	Jean Luis Apolinar Gomez Nuñez	Dominican Republic	17 December 2010	World Championships	Dubai, United Arab Emirates	
400m individual medley	4:28.05	h	Jean Luis Apolinar Gomez Nuñez	Dominican Republic	13 December 2012	World Championships	Istanbul, Turkey	
4×50m freestyle relay	1:37.74		D. Ortega; W. Rodriguez; S. Zacarías; R. D. Rodriguez	Lapia	17 October 2010	XXIII Lapia Invitational	Santiago de los Caballeros, Dominican Republic	
4×100m freestyle relay	3:38.54		Santelises; Rodríguez; Jacinto Ayala; Christopher Backhaus	DN Azul	8 December 2001	Festival FDNA	Santo Domingo, Dominican Republic	
4×200m freestyle relay								
4×50m medley relay	1:49.09		Alejandro Rosa Depratt (27.45); Fausto David Huerta Tate (28.75); Carlos Soriano Severino Jr. (28.02); Ronald Felipe Sosa (24.87)	Delfines del Naco	3 December 2017	Festival de Piscina Corta	Santo Domingo, Dominican Republic	
4×100m medley relay	3:54.50	h	Guillermo Cabrera; Alfonso Espinosa; Rodríguez; Jacinto Ayala	Dominican Republic	11 October 2004	World Championships	Indianapolis, United States	

Legend: # – Record awaiting ratification by FEDONA; WR – World record; AM – Americas record;
Records not set in finals: h – heat; sf – semifinal; r – relay 1st leg; rh – relay heat 1st leg; b – B final; † – en route to final mark; so – swim-off; tt – time trial

=== Women ===
Event	Time		Name	Club	Date	Meet	Location	Ref
50m freestyle	26.00	h	Krystal Lara	Dominican Republic	3 November 2022	World Cup	Indianapolis, United States	
100m freestyle	55.80	h	Krystal Lara	Dominican Republic	5 November 2022	World Cup	Indianapolis, United States	
200m freestyle	2:01.44	h	Krystal Lara	Dominican Republic	4 November 2022	World Cup	Indianapolis, United States	
400m freestyle	4:24.75		Elizabeth Jiménez	Marlins de Arroyo Hondo	19 February 2023	Nados Largos Delfines del Naco	Santo Domingo, Dominican Republic	
800m freestyle	9:06.25		Elizabeth Jiménez	Marlins de Arroyo Hondo	3 December 2022	Festival FEDONA	La Vega, Dominican Republic	
1500m freestyle	17:40.28		Elizabeth Jiménez	Marlins de Arroyo Hondo	2 December 2022	Festival FEDONA	La Vega, Dominican Republic	
50m backstroke	29.17	h, †	Krystal Lara	Dominican Republic	11 December 2018	World Championships	Hangzhou, China	
100m backstroke	1:00.28	h	Krystal Lara	Dominican Republic	11 December 2018	World Championships	Hangzhou, China	
200m backstroke	2:10.92	h	Krystal Lara	Dominican Republic	13 December 2018	World Championships	Hangzhou, China	
50m breaststroke	33.77		Vanessa Rivas	Tiburones	15 February 2014	-	New Westminster, Canada	
100m breaststroke	1:12.84		Vanessa Rivas	Tiburones	2 February 2014	-	Kamloops, Canada	
200m breaststroke	2:36.98		Vanessa Rivas	Tiburones	13 February 2014	-	New Westminster, Canada	
50m butterfly	27.83	h, †	Krystal Lara	Dominican Republic	17 December 2022	World Championships	Melbourne, Australia	
100m butterfly	59.78	h	Krystal Lara	Dominican Republic	17 December 2022	World Championships	Melbourne, Australia	
200m butterfly	2:11.43	h	Krystal Lara	Dominican Republic	15 December 2022	World Championships	Melbourne, Australia	
100m individual medley	1:06.18		Elizabeth Jiménez	Marlins de Arroyo Hondo	19 October 2022	Invitacional LAPIA	Santiago de los Caballeros, Dominican Republic	
200m individual medley	2:20.85		Elizabeth Jiménez	Marlins de Arroyo Hondo	19 February 2023	Nados Largos Delfines del Naco	Santo Domingo, Dominican Republic	
400m individual medley	4:57.67		Elizabeth Jiménez	Marlins de Arroyo Hondo	3 December 2022	Festival FEDONA	La Vega, Dominican Republic	
4×50m freestyle relay	1:57.18		Machado; Suárez; Machado; Priscilla Zacarías	Lapia	15 October 2000	XIII Lapia Invitational	Santiago de los Caballeros, Dominican Republic	
4×100m freestyle relay	4:16.61		Regalado; Solani; Díaz; Deyanira Placido	DN Azul	8 December 2001	Festival FDNA	Santo Domingo, Dominican Republic	
4×200m freestyle relay								
4×50m medley relay	2:14.06		Machado; Machado; Priscilla Zacarías; Suárez	Lapia	14 October 2000	XIII Lapia Invitational	Santiago de los Caballeros, Dominican Republic	
4×100m medley relay	4:48.70		Laura Rodríguez; L. Ayala; J. Santana; K. Guzmán	Distrito	19 February 2006	Juegos Nacionales	Santo Domingo, Dominican Republic	

Legend: # – Record awaiting ratification by FEDONA; WR – World record; AM – Americas record;
Records not set in finals: h – heat; sf – semifinal; r – relay 1st leg; rh – relay heat 1st leg; b – B final; † – en route to final mark; so – swim-off; tt – time trial

=== Mixed relay ===
Event	Time		Name	Club	Date	Meet	Location	Ref
4×50 m freestyle relay	1:37.25	h	Josue Dominguez (22.95); Elizabeth Jimmenez (26.47); Krystal Lara (25.35); Denzel Gonzalez (22.48)	Dominican Republic	16 December 2022	World Championships	Melbourne, Australia	
4×50 m medley relay	1:44.73	h	Elizabeth Jimenez (28.77); Josue Dominguez (26.40); Krystal Lara (27.31); Denzel Gonzalez (22.25)	Dominican Republic	14 December 2022	World Championships	Melbourne, Australia	
4×100 m medley relay	3:51.61	h, #	Elizabeth Jiménez (1:01.19); Josué Domínguez (59.17); Javier Núñez (52.97); Darielys Ortiz (58.28)	Dominican Republic	14 December 2024	World Championships	Budapest, Hungary	

Legend: # – Record awaiting ratification by FEDONA; WR – World record; AM – Americas record;
Records not set in finals: h – heat; so – swim-off
