= List of Cuban records in swimming =

The Cuban records in swimming are the fastest times ever swum by a swimmer from Cuba. These records are kept/maintained by Cuba's national swimming federation: Federacion Cubana de Natacion (FCN). Records are recognized for the following events:

- freestyle (libre): 50, 100, 200, 400, 800 and 1500;
- backstroke (dorso): 50, 100 and 200;
- breaststroke (pecho): 50, 100 and 200;
- butterfly (mariposa): 50, 100 and 200;
- individual medley (I.M.) (combinado, C.I.): 100, 200 and 400;
- relays (relevos): 400 free, 800 free, and 400 medley.

== Long course (50 m) ==
=== Men ===
Event	Time		Name	Club	Date	Meet	Location	Ref
50 m freestyle	22.15		Hanser García	Cuba	20 October 2011	Pan American Games	Guadalajara, Mexico	
100 m freestyle	48.04	sf，=	Hanser García	Cuba	31 July 2012	Olympic Games	London, Great Britain	
100 m freestyle	48.04	=	Hanser García	Cuba	1 August 2012	Olympic Games	London, Great Britain	
200 m freestyle	1:52.14		René Sáez	Cuba	12 August 1991	Pan American Games	Havana, Cuba	
400 m freestyle	3:58.78		Pedro Carrio	-	1 Januar 1990	Cuban Championships	Cuba	
800 m freestyle	8:16.24		Rodolfo Javier Falcon Jr.	Cuba	2 June 2021	Mare Nostrum	Canet-en-Roussillon, France	
1500 m freestyle	15:39.73		Pedro Carrio	Cuba	18 August 1991	Pan American Games	Havana, Cuba	
50 m backstroke	25.65		Pedro Medel	-	2 April 2012	Copa "Marcelo Salado"	Cuba	
100 m backstroke	54.83	h	Neisser Bent	Cuba	23 July 1996	Olympic Games	Atlanta, United States	
200 m backstroke	1:59.90	h	Rodolfo Falcon	Cuba	8 July 1993	Universiade	Buffalo, United States	
50m breaststroke	28.27	h	Julio Calero Suarez	Cuba	1 April 2023	Dominican Republic International Open	Santo Domingo, Dominican Republic	
100m breaststroke	1:03.05	h	Mario Gonzalez	Cuba	20 July 1996	Olympic Games	Atlanta, United States	
200m breaststroke	2:15.11	b	Mario González	Cuba	24 July 1996	Olympic Games	Atlanta, United States	
50m butterfly	24.06	=	Alex Hernández	Cuba	24 April 2016	San Juan International Open	San Juan, Puerto Rico	
50m butterfly	24.06	=	Alex Hernández	Cuba	21 April 2018	Mayaguez International	Mayaguez, Puerto Rico	
100m butterfly	53.81		Alex Hernández	Cuba	6 June 2012	Mare Nostrum	Canet-en-Roussillon, France	
200m butterfly	1:58.58	sf	Luis Vega	Cuba	6 April 2021	Russian Championships	Kazan, Russia	
200m individual medley	2:04.39		Luis Vega	Cuba	21 July 2018	Central American and Caribbean Games	Barranquilla, Colombia	
400m individual medley	4:25.05		Luis Vega Torres	Cuba	9 August 2019	Pan American Games	Lima, Peru	
4×100m freestyle relay	3:26.91		Neisser Bent; Yohan García; Ives García; Marcos Hernández	Cuba	12 August 1998	Central American and Caribbean Games	Venezuela	
4×200m freestyle relay	7:31.56			Cuba	18 August 1991	Pan American Games	Havana, Cuba	
4×100m medley relay	3:44.02			Cuba	7 August 1999	Pan American Games	Winnipeg, Canada	

Legend: # – Record awaiting ratification by FCN; WR – World record; AM – Americas record;
Records not set in finals: h – heat; sf – semifinal; r – relay 1st leg; rh – relay heat 1st leg; b – B final; † – en route to final mark; so – swim-off; tt – time trial

=== Women ===
Event	Time		Name	Club	Date	Meet	Location	Ref
50 m freestyle	25.87	b	Andrea Becali	Cuba	7 April 2026	Australian Open	Gold Coast, Australia	
100 m freestyle	55.32		Elisbet Gámez	Cuba	31 March 2023	Dominican Republic International Open	Santo Domingo, Dominican Republic	
200 m freestyle	1:58.55		Elisbet Gámez	Cuba	21 July 2018	CAC Games	Barranquilla, Colombia	
400 m freestyle	4:13.05		Elisbet Gámez	Cuba	7 November 2019	World Cup	Doha, Qatar	
800 m freestyle	8:51.42		Elisbet Gámez	Cuba	8 March 2019	Control Swim	Havana, Cuba	
1500 m freestyle	17:35.28		Mayte Gonzalez	Cuba	30 November 2021	Junior Pan American Games	Cali, Colombia	
50m backstroke	29.47		Laurent Estrada	Cuba	30 July 2026	CAC Games	Santo Domingo, Dominican Republic	
100m backstroke	1:02.97		Laurent Estrada	Cuba	31 July 2026	CAC Games	Santo Domingo, Dominican Republic	
200m backstroke	2:16.70		Ana Maria Gonzalez	Cuba	7 August 1999	Pan American Games	Winnipeg, Canada	
50m breaststroke	32.88		Imaday Núñez	Cuba	4 August 2005	CCCAN Championships	Santo Domingo, Dominican Republic	
100m breaststroke	1:10.89		Imaday Núñez	Cuba	3 May 2006	Olimpiada Nacional	Havana, Cuba	
200m breaststroke	2:34.10		Imaday Núñez	Cuba	13 August 2003	Pan American Games	Santo Domingo, Dominican Republic	
50m butterfly	28.37		Imaday Núñez	Cuba	4 August 2005	CCCAN Championships	Santo Domingo, Dominican Republic	
100m butterfly	1:02.10		Lorena Gonzalez	Cuba	27 June 2023	CAC Games	San Salvador, El Salvador	
200m butterfly	2:14.00	h	Yumisleisy Morales	Cuba	29 July 2009	World Championships	Rome, Italy	
200m individual medley	2:22.47		Imaday Núñez	Cuba	30 November 2002	Olimpiada Nacional	Cuba	
400m individual medley	5:04.97		Yanelis Labrada Pinedo	Cuba	28 June 2005	ALBA Games	Havana, Cuba	
4×50m freestyle relay								
4×100m freestyle relay	3:44.97		Lorena González (57.31); Andrea Becali (55.64); Laurent Estrada (56.71); Elisbet Gámez (55.31)	Cuba	21 October 2023	Pan American Games	Santiago, Chile	
4×200m freestyle relay	8:10.47		Lorena González (2:03.96); Andrea Becali (2:01.92); Laurent Estrada (2:06.02); Elisbet Gámez (1:59.57)	Cuba	29 June 2023	CAC Games	San Salvador, El Salvador	
4×100m medley relay	4:16.59		Laurent Estrada (1:04.02); Daysi Ramirez (1:13.22); Lorena González (1:03.66); Andrea Becali (55.69)	Cuba	25 October 2023	Pan American Games	Santiago, Chile	

Legend: # – Record awaiting ratification by FCN; WR – World record; AM – Americas record;
Records not set in finals: h – heat; sf – semifinal; r – relay 1st leg; rh – relay heat 1st leg; b – B final; † – en route to final mark; so – swim-off; tt – time trial

=== Mixed relay ===
Event	Time		Name	Nationality	Date	Meet	Location	Ref
4×50m freestyle relay	1:39.37		Andrea Becali; Elisbet Gámez	Cuba	3 April 2023	VIII Dominican Republic International Open	Santo Domingo, Dominican Republic	
4×100m freestyle relay	3:43.99	h	Maikol Rabí; Andrea Becali; Lorena González; Adrián Navarro	Cuba	27 November 2021	Junior Pan American Games	Cali, Colombia	
4×50m medley relay	1:50.23		Andrea Becali; Julio Calero; Maykon Rabi; Elisbet Gámez	Cuba	1 April 2023	VIII Dominican Republic International Open	Santo Domingo, Dominican Republic	
4×100m medley relay	3:58.69			Cuba	20 July 2018	CAC Games	Barranquilla, Colombia	

Legend: # – Record awaiting ratification by FCN;
Records not set in finals: h – heat; so – swim-off

== Short course (25 m) ==
=== Men ===
Event	Time		Name	Club	Date	Meet	Location	Ref
50m freestyle	22.04	h	Hanser García	Cuba	13 December 2012	World Championships	Istanbul, Turkey	
100m freestyle	47.19		Hanser García	Cuba	16 December 2012	World Championships	Istanbul, Turkey	
200m freestyle	1:49.54		Pedro Medel	Cuba	15 December 2011	Copa Andres Perez	Cuba	
400m freestyle	3:51.16		Pedro Carrio	Cuba	16 March 1991	World Cup	Bonn, Germany	
800m freestyle	8:00.99		Pedro Carrio	Cuba	16 February 1990	World Cup	Desenzano, Italy	
1500m freestyle	15:16.90		Pedro Carrio	Cuba	2 February 1990	World Cup	Paris, France	
50m backstroke	24.32		Rodolfo Falcon Cabrera	Cuba	17 March 2000	World Championships	Athens, Greece	
100m backstroke	52.44		Rodolfo Falcon Cabrera	Cuba	4 April 1999	World Championships	Hong Kong, Hong Kong	
200m backstroke	1:54.21		Neisser Bent	Cuba	18 April 1997	World Championships	Gothenburg, Sweden	
50m breaststroke	28.03		Pedro Manu Hernandez	Cuba	9 February 1990	World Cup	Bonn, Germany	
100m breaststroke	1:00.52		Pedro Manu Hernandez	Cuba	9 February 1990	World Cup	Bonn, Germany	
200m breaststroke	2:12.52	h	Mario Gonzalez	Cuba	2 December 1993	World Championships	Palma de Mallorca, Spain	
50m butterfly	23.98	h	Alex Hernandez Medina	Cuba	14 December 2012	World Championships	Istanbul, Turkey	
100m butterfly	53.15	h	Alex Hernandez Medina	Cuba	12 December 2012	World Championships	Istanbul, Turkey	
200m butterfly	1:57.45	h	Luis Emigdio Vega Torres	Cuba	11 December 2018	World Championships	Hangzhou, China	
100m individual medley	56.04	h	Alex Hernandez Medina	Cuba	15 December 2012	World Championships	Istanbul, Turkey	
200m individual medley	2:03.58	h	Luis Emigdio Vega Torres	Cuba	6 December 2016	World Championships	Windsor, Canada	
400m individual medley	4:19.27	h	Luis Emigdio Vega Torres	Cuba	15 December 2018	World Championships	Hangzhou, China	
4×50m freestyle relay	1:34.05			Cuba	15 December 2009	Copa Andres Perez	Cuba	
4×100m freestyle relay	3:29.16			Cuba	9 December 1986	Copa Andres Perez	Cuba	
4×200m freestyle relay	7:35.50			Cuba	12 December 1996	Copa Andres Perez	Cuba	
4×50m medley relay	1:43.41			Cuba	17 December 2009	Copa Andres Perez	Cuba	
4×100m medley relay	3:38.43			Cuba	4 April 1999	World Championships	Hong Kong, Hong Kong	

Legend: # – Record awaiting ratification by FCN; WR – World record; AM – Americas record;
Records not set in finals: h – heat; sf – semifinal; r – relay 1st leg; rh – relay heat 1st leg; b – B final; † – en route to final mark; so – swim-off; tt – time trial

=== Women ===
Event	Time		Name	Club	Date	Meet	Location	Ref
50m freestyle	25.67		Elisbet Gámez	CN Antibes	25 November 2023	Lyon Metlropoe Meeting	Lyon, France	
100m freestyle	55.14		Elisbet Gámez	Cuba	22 October 2022	Thailand Championships	Samut Prakan, Thailand	
200m freestyle	1:57.11	h	Elisbet Gámez	Cuba	18 December 2022	World Championships	Melbourne, Australia	
400m freestyle	4:08.86	h	Elisbet Gámez	Cuba	9 November 2018	World Cup	Tokyo, Japan	
800m freestyle	8:41.88		Elisbet Gámez	Cuba	17 November 2018	World Cup	Singapore, Singapore	
1500m freestyle	17:26.88		Migmari Calderon	Cuba	19 December 2007	Copa Andres Perez	Cuba	
50m backstroke	28.99	h	Ana Maria Gonzalez	Cuba	18 March 2000	World Championships	Athens, Greece	
100m backstroke	1:01.25	h	Andrea Becali	Cuba	16 December 2021	World Championships	Abu Dhabi, United Arab Emirates	
200m backstroke	2:12.01	h	Andrea Becali	Cuba	18 December 2021	World Championships	Abu Dhabi, United Arab Emirates	
50m breaststroke	31.98		Imaday Nunez Gonzalez	Cuba	12 February 2006	World Cup	Belo Horizonte, Brazil	
100m breaststroke	1:08.48		Imaday Nunez Gonzalez	Cuba	7 April 2006	World Championships	Shanghai, China	
200m breaststroke	2:28.73		Imaday Nunez Gonzalez	Cuba	9 April 2006	World Championships	Shanghai, China	
50m butterfly	28.33	h	Lorena Gonzalez	Cuba	29 Oktober 2021	World Cup	Kazan, Russia	
100m butterfly	1:01.40	h	Niuvis Rosales	Cuba	19 April 1997	World Championships	Gothenburg, Sweden	
200m butterfly	2:14.24		Yumisleisy Morales Mendoza	Cuba	15 December 2009	Copa Andres Perez	Cuba	
100m individual medley	1:04.42		Imaday Nunez Gonzalez	Cuba	12 February 2006	World Cup	Belo Horizonte, Brazil	
200m individual medley	2:21.10		Imaday Nunez Gonzalez	Cuba	11 February 2006	World Cup	Belo Horizonte, Brazil	
400m individual medley	5:01.22		Yanelis Labrada Pinedo	Cuba	15 December 2005	Copa Andres Perez	Cuba	
4×50m freestyle relay	1:47.72			Cuba	17 December 2005	Copa Andres Perez	Cuba	
4×100m freestyle relay	4:01.16			Cuba	15 December 2005	Copa Andres Perez	Cuba	
4×200m freestyle relay	8:32.17			Cuba	15 December 1988	Copa Andres Perez	Cuba	
4×50m medley relay	2:03.55			Cuba	17 December 2009	Copa Andres Perez	Cuba	
4×100m medley relay	4:26.09			Cuba	19 December 2005	Copa Andres Perez	Cuba	

Legend: # – Record awaiting ratification by FCN; WR – World record; AM – Americas record;
Records not set in finals: h – heat; sf – semifinal; r – relay 1st leg; rh – relay heat 1st leg; b – B final; † – en route to final mark; so – swim-off; tt – time trial
