= List of Colombian records in swimming =

This is a list of national swimming records for Colombia. These are the fastest times ever swum by a Colombian swimmer, which are recognised and ratified by the Federación Colombiana de Natación (FECNA).

All records were set in finals unless noted otherwise.

== Long Course (50 m) ==
=== Men ===
Event	Time		Name	Club	Date	Meet	Location	Ref
50 m freestyle	22.49		Camilo Marrugo	Findlay	16 March 2024	DII LC Invitational	Geneva, United States	
50 m freestyle	22.41	#	Camilo Marrugo	Ohio State Aquatics	18 July 2026	Speedo Sectionals	Columbus, United States	
100 m freestyle	50.15	r	Cardenio Fernández	Colombia	2 October 2024	South American Championships	Cali, Colombia	
200 m freestyle	1:48.60		Juan Morales	Minas TC	14 May 2025	Brazilian Winter Championships	Recife, Brazil	
400 m freestyle	3:47.84		Juan Morales	Minas TC	17 May 2025	Brazilian Winter Championships	Recife, Brazil	
800 m freestyle	7:54.44		Juan Morales	Colombia	2 October 2022 (Note: by official result source; 5 October 2022 by FECNA source, a typo)	South American Games	Asunción, Paraguay	
1500 m freestyle	15:15.59		Juan Morales	Colombia	4 October 2022 (Note: by official result source; 5 October 2022 by FECNA source, a typo)	South American Games	Asunción, Paraguay	
50m backstroke	25.59	c	Anthony Rincón	Scarlet Aquatics	18 June 2026	TYR Pro Swim Series	Indianapolis, United States	
100m backstroke	54.76		Omar Pinzón	Colombia	29 May 2021	Mare Nostrum	Monte Carlo, Monaco	
200m backstroke	1:56.40	sf	Omar Pinzón	Naut	27 July 2009	World Championships	Rome, Italy	
50m breaststroke	27.32	h	Jorge Murillo	Huracanes de Antioquia	17 November 2015	XX Juegos Deportivos Nacionales	Ibagué, Colombia	
100m breaststroke	59.93	h	Jorge Murillo	Colombia	6 August 2016	Olympic Games	Rio de Janeiro, Brazil	
200m breaststroke	2:11.62	h	Jorge Murillo	Colombia	15 July 2015	Pan American Games	Toronto, Canada	
50m butterfly	23.48		Emiliano Calle	Colombia	1 August 2026	CAC Games	Santo Domingo, Dominican Republic	
100m butterfly	52.71	tt	David Arias	Flamingo	17 December 2023	Colombian Club Championships	Pereira, Colombia	
200m butterfly	1:56.60	h	Jonathan Gómez	Colombia	25 July 2017	World Championships	Budapest, Hungary	
200m individual medley	2:00.56	h	Omar Pinzón	Naut	29 July 2009	World Championships	Rome, Italy	
400m individual medley	4:20.81		Omar Pinzón	Naut	16 July 2009	-		
4×50m freestyle relay	1:33.83		Juan Cambindo; Mateo de Angulo; Carlos Viveros; Gonzalez	Valle	10 June 2010	-	Medellín, Colombia	
4×100m freestyle relay	3:21.75		Tomas Osorio (51.01); Santiago Arteaga (50.87); Simón Bermúdez (50.54); Cardenio Fernández (49.33)	Antioquia	13 June 2025	Colombian Championships	Ibagué, Colombia	
4×200m freestyle relay	7:21.48		Sebastián Camacho (1:50.09); Juan Morales (1:48.84); David Arias (1:51.99); Simón Bermúdez (1:50.56)	Colombia	28 July 2026	CAC Games	Santo Domingo, Dominican Republic	
4×50m medley relay	1:42.33		Juan David Molina; Jorge Murillo; Andres Montoya; Santiago Ramírez	Colombia	1 July 2012	-	Medellín, Colombia	
4×100m medley relay	3:39.45		Anthony Rincón (55.57); Juan José Giraldo (1:01.40); David Arias (52.85); Simón Bermúdez (49.63)	Colombia	1 August 2026	CAC Games	Santo Domingo, Dominican Republic	

Legend: # – Record awaiting ratification by FECNA; WR – World record; AM – Americas record;
Records not set in finals: h – heat; sf – semifinal; r – relay 1st leg; rh – relay heat 1st leg; b – B final; † – en route to final mark; so – swim-off; tt – time trial

=== Women ===
Event	Time		Name	Club	Date	Meet	Location	Ref
50m freestyle	24.89		Sirena Rowe	Colombia	28 July 2026	CAC Games	Santo Domingo, Dominican Republic	
100m freestyle	55.21 (Note: by official result source; 55.11 by FECNA source, a typo)		Isabella Arcila	Colombia	22 July 2018	CAC Games	Barranquilla, Colombia	
200m freestyle	1:59.94		Karen Durango	Antioquia	2 April 2023 (Note: 31 March 2023 by FECNA source, a typo)	Dominican Republic International Open	Santo Domingo, Dominican Republic	
400m freestyle	4:14.58		Tiffany Murillo	Colombia	10 August 2025	Junior Pan American Games	Asunción, Paraguay	
800m freestyle	8:42.14	h	María Álvarez	Colombia	7 August 2015	World Championships	Kazan, Russia	
1500m freestyle	16:26.60		Tiffany Murillo	Antioquia	22 November 2024	Colombian Youth Games	Pereira, Colombia	
50m backstroke	28.11		Isabella Arcila	Colombia	20 July 2018	CAC Games	Barranquilla, Colombia	
100m backstroke	1:01.08	h	Isabella Arcila	Valle	15 June 2021	Colombia Open Championships	Barranquilla, Colombia	
200m backstroke	2:12.80		Jazmín Pistelli	Colombia	8 July 2026	Pan American Championships	Ibagué, Colombia	
50m breaststroke	31.41		Stefanía Gómez	Colombia	2 October 2024	South American Championships	Cali, Colombia	
100m breaststroke	1:07.92		Stefanía Gómez	Colombia	21 October 2023	Pan American Games	Santiago, Chile	
200m breaststroke	2:32.57		Stefanía Gómez	Caldes	26 November 2023	Carlos Lleras Restrepo Games	Pereira, Colombia	
50m butterfly	26.64		Sirena Rowe	-	24 November 2025	-	Lima, Peru	
50m butterfly	26.45	'#'	Sirena Rowe	Minas TC	5 December 2025	Brazilian Open	Rio de Janeiro, Brazil	
100m butterfly	59.21		Valentina Becerra	Colombia	22 October 2023	Pan American Games	Santiago, Chile	
200m butterfly	2:10.68		Karen Durango	Antioquia	1 April 2023	Dominican Republic International Open	Santo Domingo, Dominican Republic	
200m individual medley	2:15.53		Laura Melo	Colombia	13 September 2026	South American Games	Santa Fe, Argentina	
400m individual medley	4:51.43		Laura Melo	Valle	12 June 2024	Colombia Open Championships	Cartagena, Colombia	
4×50m freestyle relay	1:50.00		Carolina Colorado Henao; Olarte; Isaza; Quintero	Antioquia	15 June 2010	-	Medellín, Colombia	
4×100m freestyle relay	3:46.16	h	Isabella Arcila (56.19); Carolina Colorado Henao (56.18); María Álvarez (57.68); Jessica Camposano (56.10)	Colombia	2 August 2015	World Championships	Kazan, Russia	
4×200m freestyle relay	8:19.04	h	Jessica Camposano (2:04.24); Isabella Arcila (2:06.47); Carolina Colorado Henao (2:04.56); María Álvarez (2:03.77)	Colombia	6 August 2015	World Championships	Kazan, Russia	
4×200m freestyle relay	8:14.66	'#'	María Santana (2:05.24); Samantha Baños (2:02.88); Isabella Budnik (2:04.85); Tiffany Murillo (2:01.69)	Colombia	13 August 2025	Junior Pan American Games	Asunción, Paraguay	
4×50m medley relay	1:58.41		Carolina Colorado Henao; Velez; Quintero; Maria Paola Muñoz	Antioquia	4 June 2011	-	Cali, Colombia	
4×100m medley relay	4:04.79		Isabella Arcila (1:02.15); Stefanía Gómez (1:08.45); Valentina Becerra (58.63); Sirena Rowe (55.56)	Colombia	25 October 2023	Pan American Games	Santiago, Chile	

Legend: # – Record awaiting ratification by FECNA; WR – World record; AM – Americas record;
Records not set in finals: h – heat; sf – semifinal; r – relay 1st leg; rh – relay heat 1st leg; b – B final; † – en route to final mark; so – swim-off; tt – time trial

=== Mixed relay ===
Event	Time	Name	Club	Date	Meet	Location	Ref
4×50 m freestyle relay	1:38.94	Isabella Arcila; Carlos Viveros; Munoz; Marco Gonzalez	Valle	27 May 2017	-	Cúcuta, Colombia	
4×100 m freestyle relay	3:30.98	Frank Solano (50.46); Simón Bermúdez (49.47); Isabella Bedoya (56.20); Sirena Rowe (54.85)	Colombia	31 July 2026	CAC Games	Santo Domingo, Dominican Republic	
4×50 m medley relay	1:49.20	Isabella Arcila; Karina Vivas; Carlos Viveros; Marco Gonzalez	Valle	25 May 2017	-	Cúcuta, Colombia	
4×100 m medley relay	3:50.40	Omar Pinzón (55.30); Jorge Murillo (59.97); Valentina Becerra (1:00.76); Isabella Arcila (54.37)	Colombia	20 July 2018	CAC Games	Barranquilla, Colombia	

Legend: # – Record awaiting ratification by FECNA; WR – World record; AM – Americas record;
Records not set in finals: h – heat; so – swim-off

== Short Course (25 m) ==
=== Men ===
Event	Time		Name	Club	Date	Meet	Location	Ref
50m freestyle	22.13	rh	Camilo Becerra	SMU Mustangs	25 March 2004	NCAA Division I Championships	East Meadow, United States	
100m freestyle	49.26		David Arias	Flamingo Risaralda	24 October 2024	Colombian Championships	Medellín, Colombia	
200m freestyle	1:46.30	h	Juan Morales	Colombia	17 December 2021	World Championships	Abu Dhabi, United Arab Emirates	
200m freestyle	1:46.20	h, #	Juan Morales	Minas TC	3 September 2026	José Finkel Trophy	São Paulo, Brazil	
400m freestyle	3:44.00	h	Juan Morales	Colombia	16 December 2021	World Championships	Abu Dhabi, United Arab Emirates	
400m freestyle	3:42.76	#	Juan Morales	Minas TC	31 August 2026	José Finkel Trophy	São Paulo, Brazil	
800m freestyle	8:07.57		Sebastián Muñoz	H2o Antioquia	27 October 2024	Colombian Championships	Medellín, Colombia	
800m freestyle	7:51.31	#	Juan Morales	Minas TC	4 September 2026	José Finkel Trophy	São Paulo, Brazil	
1500m freestyle	15:37.28		Alejandro Bermúdez	Colombia	3 December 1995	World Championships	Rio de Janeiro, Brazil	
1500m freestyle	15:12.98	#	Juan Morales	Minas TC	2 September 2026	José Finkel Trophy	São Paulo, Brazil	
50m backstroke	23.98	h	Omar Pinzón	Colombia	5 December 2014	World Championships	Doha, Qatar	
100m backstroke	51.45	h	Omar Pinzón	Colombia	3 December 2014	World Championships	Doha, Qatar	
200m backstroke	1:50.46		Omar Pinzón	Colombia	9 November 2011	World Cup	Beijing, China	
50m breaststroke	26.60		Juan García	Aquatic Center	24 October 2024	Colombian Championships	Medellín, Colombia	
100m breaststroke	58.07		Juan García	Aquatic Center	26 October 2024	Colombian Championships	Medellín, Colombia	
200m breaststroke	2:08.87	h	Jorge Murillo	Colombia	5 December 2014	World Championships	Doha, Qatar	
200m breaststroke	2:07.91	#	Juan José Giraldo	Colombia	31 August 2026	José Finkel Trophy	São Paulo, Brazil	
50m butterfly	23.19		David Arias	Flamingo Risaralda	26 October 2024	Colombian Championships	Medellín, Colombia	
50m butterfly	22.95	h, #	Emiliano Calle	Colombia	3 September 2026	José Finkel Trophy	São Paulo, Brazil	
100m butterfly	51.16	h	David Arias	Flamingo Risaralda	27 October 2024	Colombian Championships	Medellín, Colombia	
200m butterfly	1:53.59		Jonathan Gómez	Colombia	7 August 2017	World Cup	Berlin, Germany	
100m individual medley	53.34		Omar Pinzón	Colombia	8 November 2011	World Cup	Beijing, China	
200m individual medley	1:56.35	h	Omar Pinzón	Colombia	17 December 2010	World Championships	Dubai, United Arab Emirates	
400m individual medley	4:11.36		Jonathan Gómez	Colombia	7 August 2017	World Cup	Berlin, Germany	
4×50m freestyle relay								
4×100m freestyle relay								
4×200m freestyle relay								
4×50m medley relay								
4×100m medley relay	3:37.35	h	Omar Pinzón (53.12); Jorge Murillo (1:01.04); Julio Galofre (53.51); Juan Cambindo (49.68)	Colombia	19 December 2010	World Championships	Dubai, United Arab Emirates	

Legend: # – Record awaiting ratification by FECNA; WR – World record; AM – Americas record;
Records not set in finals: h – heat; sf – semifinal; r – relay 1st leg; rh – relay heat 1st leg; b – B final; † – en route to final mark; so – swim-off; tt – time trial

=== Women ===
Event	Time		Name	Club	Date	Meet	Location	Ref
50m freestyle	24.64	h	Isabella Arcila	Colombia	7 August 2017	World Cup	Berlin, Germany	
100m freestyle	53.70	h	Isabella Arcila	Colombia	7 December 2016	World Championships	Windsor, Canada	
200m freestyle	1:59.04		Tiffany Murillo	Envigado	27 October 2024	Colombian Championships	Medellín, Colombia	
400m freestyle	4:09.94		Tiffany Murillo	Envigado	26 October 2024	Colombian Championships	Medellín, Colombia	
800m freestyle	8:43.87		Tiffany Murillo	CN Sabadell	22 December 2024	Spanish Club Cup Division of Honor	Sabadell, Spain	
1500m freestyle	16:48.63		Tiffany Murillo	CN Sabadell	21 December 2024	Spanish Club Cup Division of Honor	Sabadell, Spain	
50m backstroke	26.72	sf	Isabella Arcila	Colombia	9 December 2016	World Championships	Windsor, Canada	
100m backstroke	58.12	h	Isabella Arcila	Colombia	12 August 2017	World Cup	Eindhoven, Netherlands	
200m backstroke	2:06.75		Carolina Colorado Henao	Colombia	27 August 2014	World Cup	Doha, Qatar	
50m breaststroke	30.75		Stefanía Gómez	H2o Antioquia	24 October 2024	Colombian Championships	Medellín, Colombia	
50m breaststroke	30.73	#	Stefanía Gómez	CN Sabadell	21 December 2025	Spanish Club Cup Division of Honor	Sabadell, Spain	
100m breaststroke	1:06.16		Stefanía Gómez	CN Sabadell	20 December 2024	Spanish Club Cup Division of Honor	Sabadell, Spain	
200m breaststroke	2:26.01		Stefanía Gómez	CN Sabadell	21 December 2024	Spanish Club Cup Division of Honor	Sabadell, Spain	
50m butterfly	26.12	h	Sirena Rowe	Colombia	13 December 2022	World Championships	Melbourne, Australia	
50m butterfly	25.94	#	Sirena Rowe	Minas TC	3 September 2026	José Finkel Trophy	São Paulo, Brazil	
100m butterfly	58.58	h	Jessica Camposano	Colombia	6 December 2014	World Championships	Doha, Qatar	
200m butterfly	2:09.61		Karen Durango	Colombia	3 November 2022	World Cup	Indianapolis, United States	
100m individual medley	59.21		Stefanía Gómez	CN Sabadell	21 December 2024	Spanish Club Cup Division of Honor	Sabadell, Spain	
200m individual medley	2:15.01	not ratified	Stefanía Gómez	Acuatico Del Cafe	29 October 2022	Colombian Championships	Cali, Colombia	
400m individual medley	4:48.91		Laura Melo	Liga Bogota	7 November 2025	FENABA Anniversary Tournament	Buenos Aires, Argentina	
4×50m freestyle relay								
4×100m freestyle relay								
4×200m freestyle relay								
4×50m medley relay								
4×100m medley relay								

Legend: # – Record awaiting ratification by FECNA; WR – World record; AM – Americas record;
Records not set in finals: h – heat; sf – semifinal; r – relay 1st leg; rh – relay heat 1st leg; b – B final; † – en route to final mark; so – swim-off; tt – time trial

=== Mixed relay ===
Event	Time		Name	Club	Date	Meet	Location	Ref
4×50m freestyle relay	1:35.07	h	Santiago Corredor (22.99); Jorge Murillo (22.78); Stefanía Gómez (25.06); Sirena Rowe (24.24)	Colombia	16 December 2022	World Championships	Melbourne, Australia	
4×50m medley relay	1:42.46	h	Santiago Corredor (24.77); Jorge Murillo (26.49); Sirena Rowe (26.16); Stefanía Gómez (25.04)	Colombia	14 December 2022	World Championships	Melbourne, Australia	

Legend: # – Record awaiting ratification by FECNA; WR – World record; AM – Americas record;
Records not set in finals: h – heat; sf – semifinal; r – relay 1st leg; rh – relay heat 1st leg; b – B final; † – en route to final mark; so – swim-off; tt – time trial
