= Swimming at the 2026 Central American and Caribbean Games =

- Venue: Centro Olímpico Juan Pablo Duarte
- Location: Santo Domingo, Dominican Republic
- Dates: 28 July – 1 August

The swimming competition at the 2026 Central American and Caribbean Games was held in Santo Domingo, Dominican Republic, from 28 July to 1 August 2026 at the Centro Olímpico Juan Pablo Duarte.

== Medal table ==
* Host nation (Dominican Republic)

Rank	Nation	Gold	Silver	Bronze	Total
1	Mexico (MEX)	22	12	5	39
2	Puerto Rico (PUR)	6	4	5	15
3	Trinidad and Tobago (TTO)	4	1	2	7
4	Guyana (GUY)	3	0	0	3
5	Colombia (COL)	2	10	9	21
6	Venezuela (VEN)	2	7	13	22
7	Guatemala (GUA)	1	1	1	3
8	El Salvador (ESA)	1	0	1	2
9	Costa Rica (CRC)	1	0	0	1
10	Panama (PAN)	0	3	0	3
11	Dominican Republic (DOM)*	0	2	3	5
12	Bermuda (BER)	0	1	1	2
12	Cuba (CUB)	0	1	1	2
14	Aruba (ARU)	0	0	2	2
Totals (14 entries)		42	42	43	127

== Medal summary ==
=== Men's events ===
Event	Gold		Silver		Bronze	
50 m freestyle	Nikoli Blackman; Trinidad and Tobago	21.98	Jorge Otaiza; Venezuela	22.42	Javier Núñez; Dominican Republic	22.46
100 m freestyle	Nikoli Blackman; Trinidad and Tobago	49.15	Javier Núñez; Dominican Republic	49.43	Jorge Otaiza; Venezuela	49.44
200 m freestyle	Raekwon Noel; Guyana	1:47.08 GR	Jorge Iga; Mexico	1:47.95	Nikoli Blackman; Trinidad and Tobago	1:49.41
400 m freestyle	Juan Morales; Colombia	3:51.96	Paulo Strehlke; Mexico	3:52.60	Adanuriel Rosal; Venezuela	3:54.11
800 m freestyle	Paulo Strehlke; Mexico	7:58.07 GR	Daniel Saborio; Mexico	8:05.04	Juan Morales; Colombia	8:06.15
1500 m freestyle	Paulo Strehlke; Mexico	15:03.87 GR	Ronaldo Zambrano; Venezuela	15:45.32	Raúl Briceño; Venezuela	15:55.51
50 m backstroke	Marcus Reyes; Mexico	24.83	Liam Carrington; Trinidad and Tobago	25.10	Jack Harvey; Bermuda	25.33
100 m backstroke	Marcus Reyes; Mexico	53.84	Jack Harvey; Bermuda	54.56	Patrick Groters; Aruba	54.83
200 m backstroke	Humberto Nájera; Mexico	1:58.62 GR	Yeziel Morales; Puerto Rico	1:59.43	Patrick Groters; Aruba	1:59.91
50 m breaststroke	Andrés Puente; Mexico	27.74	Juan García; Colombia	27.80	Josué Domínguez; Dominican Republic	27.93
100 m breaststroke	Xavier Ruiz; Puerto Rico	1:00.80	Andrés Puente; Mexico	1:01.39	Juan José Giraldo; Colombia	1:01.80
200 m breaststroke	Xavier Ruiz; Puerto Rico	2:12.00	Juan José Giraldo; Colombia	2:13.62	Andres Puente; Mexico	2:15.43
50 m butterfly	Dylan Carter; Trinidad and Tobago	23.43	Emiliano Calle; Colombia	23.48 NR	Jorge Otaiza; Venezuela	23.56
100 m butterfly	Manuel Díaz; Venezuela	52.45	Jorge Otaiza; Venezuela	52.91	Dylan Carter; Trinidad and Tobago	52.99
200 m butterfly	Raekwon Noel; Guyana	1:56.82 GR	Manuel Díaz; Venezuela	1:58.07	Rafael Arizpe; Mexico	1:58.77
200 m butterfly	Raekwon Noel; Guyana	1:56.82 GR	Manuel Díaz; Venezuela	1:58.07	Andrés Brooks; Puerto Rico	1:58.77
200 m individual medley	Raekwon Noel; Guyana	1:59.35 GR	Humberto Nájera; Mexico	2:00.07	Erick Gordillo; Guatemala	2:01.29
400 m individual medley	Erick Gordillo; Guatemala	4:17.68 GR	Humberto Nájera; Mexico	4:21.57	Xavier Ruiz; Puerto Rico	4:21.69
4 × 100 m freestyle relay	Trinidad and Tobago; Liam Carrington; Dylan Carter; Zerek Wilson; Nikoli Blackman	3:16.91 GR	Mexico; Andrés Dupont; Santiago Blanco; David Medina; Jorge Iga	3:18.06	Venezuela; Dennis Pérez; Jorge Otaiza; Manuel Díaz; Emil Pérez	3:19.69
4 × 200 m freestyle relay	Mexico; David Medina; Daniel Saborio; Andrés Dupont; Jorge Iga	7:15.60 GR	Colombia; Sebastián Camacho; Juan Morales; David Arias; Simón Bermúdez	7:21.48 NR	Venezuela; Dennis Pérez; Adanuriel Rosal; Winston Rodríguez; Raúl Briceño	7:30.48
4 × 100 m medley relay	Mexico; Marcus Reyes; Andrés Puente; Jorge Iga; Andrés Dupont	3:36.96 GR	Puerto Rico; Yeziel Morales; Xavier Ruiz; Andrés Brooks; Alexander Santiago	3:38.65	Colombia; Anthony Rincón; Juan José Giraldo; David Arias; Simón Bermúdez	3:39.45 NR

=== Women's events ===
Event	Gold		Silver		Bronze	
50 m freestyle	Sirena Rowe; Colombia	24.89 GR, NR	Celia Pulido; Mexico	25.35	Marina Spadoni; El Salvador	25.42
100 m freestyle	Celia Pulido; Mexico	55.50	Andrea Becali; Cuba	55.88	María Yegres; Venezuela	55.92
200 m freestyle	Ava Chávez; Mexico	1:59.65	María Yegres; Venezuela	1:59.86	Andrea Becali; Cuba	2:02.18
400 m freestyle	María Yegres; Venezuela	4:17.14	Lucianna Gutierrez; Puerto Rico	4:19.77	Mariana Cabezas; Colombia	4:20.11
800 m freestyle	Lucianna Gutiérrez; Puerto Rico	8:56.90	Mariana Cote; Venezuela	8:57.03	Mariana Cabezas; Colombia	8:57.24
1500 m freestyle	Yuritzi Salgado; Mexico	17:01.44 GR	Regina Medina; Mexico	17:03.57	Lucianna Gutiérrez; Puerto Rico	17:04.29
50 m backstroke	Celia Pulido; Mexico	28.58	Jazmín Pistelli; Colombia	28.85	Laura Melo; Colombia	29.10
100 m backstroke	Celia Pulido; Mexico	1:00.83 GR	Miranda Grana; Mexico	1:01.45	Jazmín Pistelli; Colombia	1:01.88
200 m backstroke	Daniela Linares; Mexico	2:10.68 GR	Kristen Romano; Puerto Rico	2:11.68	Celia Pulido; Mexico	2:12.92
50 m breaststroke	Melissa Rodríguez; Mexico	31.35	Emily Santos; Panama	31.81	Mercedes Toledo; Venezuela	32.07
100 m breaststroke	Melissa Rodríguez; Mexico	1:08.60	Emily Santos; Panama	1:09.35	Marielys Martínez; Venezuela	1:09.45
200 m breaststroke	Melissa Rodríguez; Mexico	2:27.99	Emily Santos; Panama	2:29.19	Kristen Romano; Puerto Rico	2:30.71
50 m butterfly	Marina Spadoni; El Salvador	26.38 GR	Jianna Amores; Dominican Republic	26.41	Celia Pulido; Mexico	26.51
100 m butterfly	Kristen Romano; Puerto Rico	58.79 GR	Miranda Grana; Mexico	58.89	Jianna Amores; Dominican Republic	59.19
200 m butterfly	Yanin Ortiz; Costa Rica	2:13.73	Samantha Baños; Colombia	2:13.77	Mónica Leydar; Venezuela	2:14.39
200 m individual medley	Kristen Romano; Puerto Rico	2:12.16 GR	Miranda Grana; Mexico	2:14.89	Ava Chávez; Mexico	2:16.21
400 m individual medley	Kristen Romano; Puerto Rico	4:44.87 GR	Stephanie Iannaccone; Guatemala	4:54.12	Laura Melo; Colombia	4:54.18
4 × 100 m freestyle relay	Mexico; Daniela Linares; Susana Hernández; María Méndez; Celia Pulido	3:45.62	Colombia; Isabella Bedoya; Stefanía Gómez; Laura Melo; Sirena Rowe	3:48.76	Venezuela; María Yegres; Daniela Pacheco; Carla González; Paola Azzato	3:50.46
4 × 200 m freestyle relay	Mexico; Ava Chávez; Susana Hernández; Aranza López; Celia Pulido	8:15.21	Venezuela; María Yegres; Daniela Pacheco; Paola Azzato; Mariana Cote	8:23.14	Colombia; Samantha Baños; Mariana Cabezas; Stefanía Gómez; Jazmín Pistelli	8:27.68
4 × 100 m medley relay	Mexico; Daniela Linares; Melissa Rodríguez; Miranda Grana; Celia Pulido	4:05.25 GR	Colombia; Jazmín Pistelli; Laura Melo; Samantha Baños; Sirena Rowe	4:11.44	Venezuela; Carla González; Marielys Martinez; Monica Leydar; María Yegres	4:12.16

=== Mixed events ===
Event	Gold		Silver		Bronze	
4 × 100 m freestyle relay	Mexico; Jorge Iga; Andrés Dupont; Susana Hernández; Celia Pulido; Daniel Saborio*; Santiago Blance*; María Méndez*; Ava Chávez*	3:30.87 GR	Colombia; Frank Solano; Simón Bermúdez; Isabella Bedoya; Sirena Rowe; Juan García*; Stefanía Gómez*	3:30.98 NR	Venezuela; Dennis Pérez; Jorge Otaiza; Carla González; Maria Yegres; Manuel Díaz*; Emil Pérez*; Mariana Cote*; Daniela Pacheco*	3:34.15
4 × 100 m medley relay	Mexico; Marcus Reyes; Andrés Puente; Miranda Grana; Celia Pulido; Rafael Arizpe*; Melissa Rodríguez*; María Méndez*; Santiago Blanco*	3:50.54	Colombia; Jazmín Pistelli; Juan José Giraldo; David Arias; Sirena Rowe; Emiliano Calle*; Samantha Baños*	3:51.89	Puerto Rico; Yeziel Morales; Xavier Ruiz; Kristen Romano; Ella Busquets	3:52.23

== See also ==
- Open water swimming at the 2026 Central American and Caribbean Games
