= Swimming at the 2014 South American Games – Women's 200 metre freestyle =

Women's 200 metre freestyle at the 2014 South American Games
- Venue: Estadio Nacional
- Dates: March 9, 2014 (heats & finals)
- Competitors: 15 from 10 nations
- Winning time: 1:59.89

Medalists
gold medal	Andreina Pinto	Venezuela
silver medal	Jessica Camposano	Colombia
bronze medal	Jéssica Cavalheiro	Brazil

The women's 200 metre freestyle competition at the 2014 South American Games took place on March 9 at the Estadio Nacional. The last champion was Cecilia Biagioli of Argentina.

This race consisted of four lengths of the pool, all in freestyle.

== Records ==
Prior to this competition, the existing world and Pan Pacific records were as follows:

World record	Federica Pellegrini (ITA)	1:52.98	Rome, Italy	July 29, 2009
South American Games record	Cecilia Biagioli (ARG)	2:02.70	Buenos Aires, Argentina	November 17, 2006

== Results ==
All times are in minutes and seconds.

KEY:	q	Fastest non-qualifiers	Q	Qualified	CR	Championships record	NR	National record	PB	Personal best	SB	Seasonal best

=== Heats ===
The first round was held on March 9, at 11:43.

Rank	Heat	Lane	Name	Nationality	Time	Notes
1	1	5	Jessica Camposano	Colombia	2:05.49	Q
2	1	4	Manuella Lyrio	Brazil	2:05.50	Q
3	2	4	Andreina Pinto	Venezuela	2:05.75	Q
4	2	5	Jéssica Cavalheiro	Brazil	2:06.17	Q
5	1	2	María Álvarez	Colombia	2:06.25	Q
6	2	3	Andrea Cedrón	Peru	2:06.89	Q
7	2	6	Yennifer Marquez Mendoza	Venezuela	2:07.75	Q
8	1	7	Courtney Schultz Donlan	Chile	2:10.36	Q
9	2	7	Nicole Marmol Gilbert	Ecuador	2:12.06	
10	2	2	Jessica Cattaneo Paulista	Peru	2:12.19	
11	2	8	Maria Arrua Villagra	Paraguay	2:13.31	
12	1	1	Laura Orihuela Gianotti	Paraguay	2:14.95	
13	2	1	Carolina Cazot Tort	Uruguay	2:19.81	
14	1	6	Maria Belen Diaz	Argentina	2:22.17	
15	1	8	Alondra Castillo Sulca	Bolivia	2:22.54	

=== Final ===
The final was held on March 9, at 19:11.

Rank	Lane	Name	Nationality	Time	Notes
1st place, gold medalist(s)	3	Andreina Pinto	Venezuela	1:59.89	CR, NR
2nd place, silver medalist(s)	4	Jessica Camposano	Colombia	2:01.10	NR
3rd place, bronze medalist(s)	6	Jéssica Cavalheiro	Brazil	2:01.27	
4	5	Manuella Lyrio	Brazil	2:02.67	
5	2	María Álvarez	Colombia	2:05.28	
6	1	Yennifer Marquez Mendoza	Venezuela	2:06.22	
7	7	Andrea Cedrón	Peru	2:07.38	
8	8	Courtney Schultz Donlan	Chile	2:08.56	
