= List of South American Games records in swimming =

The fastest times in the swimming events at the South American Games are designated as the South American Games records in swimming and maintained by the South American Swimming Confederation (CONSANAT).

The most recent edition of these games were the aquatics competitions at the 2014 South American Games in March 2014.

== Participating countries ==
CONSANAT member countries participate in these Championships:

- Argentina
- Aruba
- Bolivia
- Brazil
- Colombia
- Chile
- Ecuador
- Guyana
- Panama
- Paraguay
- Peru
- Suriname
- Uruguay
- Venezuela

== Games records ==
All records were set in finals unless noted otherwise. All times are swum in a long-course (50m) pool.

=== Men ===
| Event | Time | | Name | Nationality | Date | Meet | Location | Ref |
|---|---|---|---|---|---|---|---|---|
| 50 m freestyle | 21.88 | h | Pedro Spajari | Brazil | 16 September 2026 | 2026 South American Games | Santa Fe, Argentina | |
| 100 m freestyle | 48.94 | | Breno Correia | Brazil | 13 September 2026 | 2026 South American Games | Santa Fe, Argentina | |
| 200 m freestyle | 1:47.16 | | Stephan Steverink | Brazil | 14 September 2026 | 2026 South American Games | Santa Fe, Argentina | |
| 400 m freestyle | 3:46.07 | | Stephan Steverink | Brazil | 16 September 2026 | 2026 South American Games | Santa Fe, Argentina | |
| 800 m freestyle | 7:51.56 | | Guilherme Costa | Brazil | 2 October 2022 | 2022 South American Games | Asunción, Paraguay | |
| 1500 m freestyle | 15:13.51 | | Guilherme Costa | Brazil | 4 October 2022 | 2022 South American Games | Asunción, Paraguay | |
| 50 m backstroke | 25.06 | | Guilherme Basseto | Brazil | 2 October 2022 | 2022 South American Games | Asunción, Paraguay | |
| 100 m backstroke | 54.31 | | Albert Subirats Altes | Venezuela | 8 March 2014 | 2014 South American Games | Santiago, Chile | |
| 200 m backstroke | 1:59.02 | | Leonardo de Deus | Brazil | 4 October 2022 | 2022 South American Games | Asunción, Paraguay | |
| 50 m breaststroke | 27.13 | | João Gomes Júnior | Brazil | 15 September 2026 | 2026 South American Games | Santa Fe, Argentina | |
| 100m breaststroke | 1:00.74 | | Caio Pumputis | Brazil | 13 September 2026 | 2026 South American Games | Santa Fe, Argentina | |
| 200m breaststroke | 2:13.22 | | Evandro Silva | Brazil | 3 October 2022 | 2022 South American Games | Asunción, Paraguay | |
| 50m butterfly | 23.44 | h | Santiago Grassi | Argentina | 14 September 2026 | 2026 South American Games | Santa Fe, Argentina | |
| 100m butterfly | 51.91 | | Elias Ardiles | Chile | 15 September 2026 | 2026 South American Games | Santa Fe, Argentina | |
| 200m butterfly | 1:57.17 | | Leonardo de Deus | Brazil | 5 October 2022 | 2022 South American Games | Asunción, Paraguay | |
| 200m individual medley | 1:58.97 | | Gabriel Núñez | Brazil | 13 September 2026 | 2026 South American Games | Santa Fe, Argentina | |
| 400m individual medley | 4:19.25 | | Brandonn Almeida | Brazil | 3 October 2022 | 2022 South American Games | Asunción, Paraguay | |
| 4×100m freestyle relay | 3:16.34 | | Luiz Borges (49.13); Gabriel Santos (49.11); Felipe Ribeiro (50.58); Vinicius Assunção (47.52) | Brazil | 4 October 2022 | 2022 South American Games | Asunción, Paraguay | |
| 4×200m freestyle relay | 7:20.18 | | Breno Correia (1:48.53); Guilherme Costa (1:50.78); Vinicius Assunção (1:49.92); Leonardo Coelho Santos (1:50.95) | Brazil | 2 October 2022 | 2022 South American Games | Asunción, Paraguay | |
| 4×100m medley relay | 3:36.37 | | Guilherme Basseto (55.41); Caio Pumputis (1:00.10); Pedro Buch (51.98); Breno Correia (48.88) | Brazil | 14 September 2026 | 2026 South American Games | Santa Fe, Argentina | |

Legend: # – Record awaiting ratification by CONSANAT; WR – World record; AM – Americas record;
Records not set in finals: h – heat; sf – semifinal; r – relay 1st leg; rh – relay heat 1st leg; b – B final; † – en route to final mark; so – swim-off; tt – time trial

=== Women ===
| Event | Time | | Name | Nationality | Date | Meet | Location | Ref |
|---|---|---|---|---|---|---|---|---|
| 50m freestyle | 25.13 | | Lismar Lyon | Venezuela | 16 September 2026 | 2026 South American Games | Santa Fe, Argentina | |
| 100m freestyle | 54.99 | | Stephanie Balduccini | Brazil | 2 October 2022 | 2022 South American Games | Asunción, Paraguay | |
| 200m freestyle | 1:59.89 | | Andreina Pinto | Venezuela | 9 March 2014 | 2014 South American Games | Santiago, Chile | |
| 400m freestyle | 4:10.71 | | Andreina Pinto | Venezuela | 7 March 2014 | 2014 South American Games | Santiago, Chile | |
| 800m freestyle | 8:35.41 | | Andreina Pinto | Venezuela | 8 March 2014 | 2014 South American Games | Santiago, Chile | |
| 1500m freestyle | 16:15.43 | | Kristel Köbrich | Chile | 4 October 2022 | 2022 South American Games | Asunción, Paraguay | |
| 50m backstroke | 28.38 | = | Cecilia Dieleke | Argentina | 13 September 2026 | 2026 South American Games | Santa Fe, Argentina | |
| 50m backstroke | 28.38 | = | Etiene Medeiros | Brazil | 13 September 2026 | 2026 South American Games | Santa Fe, Argentina | |
| 100m backstroke | 1:00.61 | | Cecilia Dieleke | Argentina | 14 September 2026 | 2026 South American Games | Santa Fe, Argentina | |
| 200m backstroke | 2:10.99 | | Malena Santillán | Argentina | 15 September 2026 | 2026 South American Games | Santa Fe, Argentina | |
| 50m breaststroke | 31.15 | | Jhennifer Conceição | Brazil | 4 October 2022 | 2022 South American Games | Asunción, Paraguay | |
| 100m breaststroke | 1:06.80 | | Macarena Ceballos | Argentina | 13 September 2026 | 2026 South American Games | Santa Fe, Argentina | |
| 200m breaststroke | 2:28.21 | | Macarena Ceballos | Argentina | 14 September 2026 | 2026 South American Games | Santa Fe, Argentina | |
| 50m butterfly | 26.38 | | Lismar Lyon | Venezuela | 14 September 2026 | 2026 South American Games | Santa Fe, Argentina | |
| 100m butterfly | 59.28 | | Giovanna Diamante | Brazil | 4 October 2022 | 2022 South American Games | Asunción, Paraguay | |
| 200m butterfly | 2:12.42 | | Andreina Pinto | Venezuela | 9 March 2014 | 2014 South American Games | Santiago, Chile | |
| 200m individual medley | 2:13.92 | | Gabrielle Roncatto | Brazil | 2 October 2022 | 2022 South American Games | Asunción, Paraguay | |
| 400m individual medley | 4:46.49 | | Florencia Perotti | Argentina | 3 October 2022 | 2022 South American Games | Asunción, Paraguay | |
| 4×100m freestyle relay | 3:43.07 | | Ana Carolina Vieira (55.86); Giovanna Diamante (55.40); Aline Rodrigues (55.92); Stephanie Balduccini (55.89) | Brazil | 4 October 2022 | 2022 South American Games | Asunción, Paraguay | |
| 4×200m freestyle relay | 8:09.77 | | Maria Heitmann (2:00.97); Giovanna Diamante (2:02.43); Aline Rodrigues (2:01.42); Stephanie Balduccini (2:04.95) | Brazil | 2 October 2022 | 2022 South American Games | Asunción, Paraguay | |
| 4×100m medley relay | 4:06.45 | | Cecilia Dieleke (1:01.18); Macarena Ceballos (1:07.63); Laila Chain (1:01.24); Andrea Berrino (56.40) | Argentina | 14 September 2026 | 2026 South American Games | Santa Fe, Argentina | |

Legend: # – Record awaiting ratification by CONSANAT; WR – World record; AM – Americas record;
Records not set in finals: h – heat; sf – semifinal; r – relay 1st leg; rh – relay heat 1st leg; b – B final; † – en route to final mark; so – swim-off; tt – time trial

=== Mixed relay ===
| Event | Time | Name | Club | Date | Meet | Location | Ref |
|---|---|---|---|---|---|---|---|
| 4×100m freestyle relay | 3:30.22 | Vinicius Assunção (49.11); Gabriel Santos (49.58); Giovanna Diamante (56.35); Stephanie Balduccini (55.18) | Brazil | 5 October 2022 | 2022 South American Games | Asunción, Paraguay | |
| 4×100m medley relay | 3:49.56 | Guilherme Basseto (54.76); Evandro Silva (1:00.97); Giovanna Diamante (58.82); Stephanie Balduccini (55.01) | Brazil | 5 October 2022 | 2022 South American Games | Asunción, Paraguay | |

Legend: # – Record awaiting ratification by CONSANAT; WR – World record; AM – Americas record;
Records not set in finals: h – heat; sf – semifinal; r – relay 1st leg; rh – relay heat 1st leg; b – B final; † – en route to final mark; so – swim-off; tt – time trial
