= Swimming at the 2026 South American Games =

Swimming competitions at the 2026 South American Games

- Venue: Invencible Centro Acuático Provincial
- Dates: September 13–16
- Competitors: 139 from 14 nations

Swimming competitions at the 2026 South American Games in Rosario, Santa Fe, and Rafaela, Argentina, were held between September 13 and 16 at Invencible Centro Acuático Provincial, located within Museo del Deporte Santafesino in Santa Fe.

A total of 41 events were contested (20 men, 20 women and one mixed). The times achieved by the athletes was considered for the qualification for different international competitions, including the 2027 Pan American Games.

== Medal summary ==
=== Medal table ===
* Host nation (Argentina)

Rank	Nation	Gold	Silver	Bronze	Total
1	Brazil	29	19	9	57
2	Argentina*	7	8	13	28
3	Venezuela	4	6	3	13
4	Chile	1	3	6	10
5	Uruguay	1	0	0	1
6	Colombia	0	7	7	14
7	Peru	0	1	2	3
8	Paraguay	0	0	1	1
Totals (8 entries)		42	44	41	127

=== Medalists ===
==== Men ====
Event	Gold		Silver		Bronze	
50 metre freestyle	Pedro Spajari; Brazil	21.91	Jorge Otaiza; Venezuela	22.29	Santiago Grassi; Argentina	22.33
100 metre freestyle	Breno Correia; Brazil	48.94 GR	Jorge Otaiza; Venezuela	49.73	Marco Ferreira; Brazil	49.75
200 metre freestyle	Stephan Steverink; Brazil	1:47.16 GR	Murilo Sartori; Brazil	1:47.49	Juan Morales; Colombia	1:49.69
400 metre freestyle	Stephan Steverink; Brazil	3:46.07 GR	Guilherme Costa; Brazil	3:48.57	Juan Morales; Colombia	3:50.39
800 metre freestyle	Guilherme Costa; Brazil	7:52.86	Stephan Steverink; Brazil	7:55.30	Lucas Alba; Argentina	7:55.78
1500 metre freestyle	Guilherme Costa; Brazil	15:15.04	Lucas Alba; Argentina	15:17.02	Stephan Steverink; Brazil	15:24.97
50 metre backstroke	Guilherme Basseto; Brazil	25.15	Samuel de Oliveira; Brazil	25.64	Charles Hockin; Paraguay	25.99
100 metre backstroke	Guilherme Basseto; Brazil	54.54	Samuel de Oliveira; Brazil	55.20	José Materano; Argentina	56.01
200 metre backstroke	Leonardo de Deus; Brazil	2:00.29	Edhy Vargas; Chile	2:01.69	José Materano; Argentina	2:02.24
50 metre breaststroke	João Gomes Júnior; Brazil	27.13 GR	Caio Pumputis; Brazil	27.31	Mariano Lazzerini; Chile	28.03
100 metre breaststroke	Caio Pumputis; Brazil	1:00.74 GR	João Gomes Júnior; Brazil	1:01.16	Mariano Lazzerini; Chile	1:01.22
200 metre breaststroke	Caio Pumputis; Brazil	2:13.55	Juan José Giraldo; Colombia	2:14.01	Mariano Lazzerini; Chile	2:14.30
50 metre butterfly	Jorge Otaiza; Venezuela	23.60	Santiago Grassi; Argentina	23.62	Ulises Cazau; Argentina	23.84
100 metre butterfly	Elías Ardiles; Chile	51.91 GR	Manuel Díaz; Venezuela	52.22	Pedro Buch; Brazil	52.33
200 metre butterfly	Leonardo de Deus; Brazil	1:57.86	Manuel Díaz; Venezuela	1:57.87	Pedro Buch; Brazil	1:58.44
200 metre individual medley	Gabriel Machuco; Brazil	1:58.97 GR	Leonardo Santos; Brazil	2:02.01	Winston Rodríguez; Venezuela	2:07.35
400 metre individual medley	Stephan Steverink; Brazil	4:24.19	Leonardo Santos; Brazil	4:26.65	Sebastián Camacho; Colombia	4:30.08
4 × 100 metre freestyle relay	Breno Correia; Murilo Sartori; Gabriel Nunes; Marco Ferreira; Brazil	3:17.54	Dennis Perez; Cesar Paredes; Manuel Díaz; Jorge Otaiza; Venezuela	3:19.84	Matías Chaillou; Guido Buscaglia; Santiago Grassi; Maximo Aguilar; Argentina	3:20.24
4 × 200 metre freestyle relay	Leonardo Santos; Stephan Steverink; Murilo Sartori; Breno Correia; Brazil	7:22.39	David Arias; Juan Morales; Sebastián Camacho; Juan García; Colombia	7:27.22	Guido Buscaglia; Matías Chaillou; Lucas Alba; Maximo Aguilar; Argentina	7:29.44
4 × 100 metre medley relay	Guilherme Basseto; Caio Pumputis; Pedro Buch; Breno Correia; Brazil	3:36.37 GR	Edhy Vargas; Mariano Lazzerini; Elías Ardiles; Luis Toledo; Chile	3:38.01	José Materano; Dante Nicola; Santiago Grassi; Matías Chaillou; Argentina	3:40.16

==== Women ====
Event	Gold		Silver		Bronze	
50 metre freestyle	Lismar Lyon; Venezuela	25.13 GR	Sirena Rowe; Colombia	25.20	Luanna Nunes; Brazil	25.36
100 metre freestyle	Angelina Solari; Uruguay	55.41	Rafaela Fernandini; Peru	55.65	Luanna Nunes; Brazil	55.67
200 metre freestyle	Aline Rodrigues; Brazil	2:01.02	Gabrielle Roncatto; Brazil	2:01.06	Inés Marín; Chile	2:02.19
400 metre freestyle	Gabrielle Roncatto; Brazil	4:14.45	Malena Santillán; Argentina	4:15.05	Beatriz Dizotti; Brazil	4:15.08
800 metre freestyle	Gabrielle Roncatto; Brazil	8:37.15	Beatriz Dizotti; Brazil	8:37.36	Kristel Köbrich; Chile	8:41.47
1500 metre freestyle	Beatriz Dizotti; Brazil	16:20.88	Kristel Köbrich; Chile	16:35.50	Delfina Dini; Argentina	16:53.20
50 metre backstroke	Etiene Medeiros; Brazil Cecilia Dieleke; Argentina	28.38 GR	Not awarded		Andrea Berrino; Argentina	28.67
100 metre backstroke	Cecilia Dieleke; Argentina	1:00.61 GR	Maria de Carvalho; Brazil	1:01.62	Jazmín Pistelli; Colombia	1:01.68
200 metre backstroke	Malena Santillán; Argentina	2:10.99 GR	Cecilia Dieleke; Argentina	2:11.09	Jazmín Pistelli; Colombia	2:12.88
50 metre breaststroke	Macarena Ceballos; Argentina	31.53	Mercedes Toledo; Venezuela	31.87	Martina Barbeito; Argentina	32.32
100 metre breaststroke	Macarena Ceballos; Argentina	1:06.80 GR	Martina Barbeito; Argentina	1:09.26	Mercedes Toledo; Venezuela	1:09.56
200 metre breaststroke	Macarena Ceballos; Argentina	2:28.21 GR	Agatha Marcondes; Brazil	2:29.97	Martina Barbeito; Argentina	2:30.29
50 metre butterfly	Lismar Lyon; Venezuela	26.38 GR	Giulia Carvalho; Brazil	26.49	Sirena Rowe; Colombia	26.79
100 metre butterfly	Lismar Lyon; Venezuela	59.52	Joice Otero; Brazil Giulia Carvalho; Brazil	59.69	not awarded	
200 metre butterfly	Maria de Carvalho; Brazil	2:12.61	Samantha Baños; Colombia	2:14.28	Yasmin Silva; Peru	2:14.84
200 metre individual medley	Agatha Marcondes; Brazil	2:15.25	Laura Melo; Colombia	2:15.53 NR	Manuela Astori; Brazil	2:17.32
400 metre individual medley	Agatha Marcondes; Brazil	4:46.65	Laila Chain; Argentina	4:50.98	Manuela Astori; Brazil	4:54.79
4 × 100 metre freestyle relay	Giovana Reis; Aline Rodrigues; Giulia Carvalho; Luanna Nunes; Brazil	3:43.71	Andrea Berrino; Lara Fernandez; Laila Chain; Cecilia Dieleke; Argentina	3:48.36	Rafaela Fernandini; Micaela Bernales; Eva Boehlke; Alexia Sotomayor; Peru	3:50.12
4 × 200 metre freestyle relay	Aline Rodrigues; Manuela Astori; Giovana Reis; Gabrielle Roncatto; Brazil	8:12.89	Jazmín Pistelli; Laura Melo; Samantha Baños; Mariana Cabezas; Colombia	8:24.09	Delfina Dini; Laia Chain; Malena Santillán; Cecilia Dieleke; Argentina	8:24.60
4 × 100 metre medley relay	Cecilia Dieleke; Macarena Ceballos; Laia Chain; Andrea Berrino; Argentina	4:06.45 GR	Jazmín Pistelli; Laura Melo; Samantha Baños; Sirena Rowe; Colombia	4:10.26	Carla González; Mercedes Toledo; Lismar Lyon; Daniela Pacheco; Venezuela	4:11.16

==== Mixed ====
Event	Gold		Silver		Bronze	
4 × 100 metres medley relay	Brazil; Fernanda de Goeij; João Gomes Júnior; Pedro Buch; Luanna Nunes	3:50.43	Argentina; Cecilia Dieleke; Macarena Ceballos; Santiago Grassi; Matías Chaillou	3:51.08	Chile; Paz Ardiles; Mariano Lazzerini; Elías Ardiles; Inés Marín	3:51.95

== Participation ==
Fourteen nations participated in the swimming events of the 2026 South American Games.

- Argentina (19)
- Aruba (3)
- Bolivia (12)
- Brazil (29)
- Chile (14)
- Colombia (11)
- Curaçao (1)
- Ecuador (5)
- Panama (2)
- Paraguay (9)
- Peru (8)
- Suriname (2)
- Uruguay (8)
- Venezuela (16)
