= Nicholas Schwab =

Dominican Republic swimmer (born 1990)

Nicholas Andrew Schwab Alfaro
Personal information
- Nationality: Dominican / American
- Born: Miami, Florida, U.S.
- Height: 6 ft 1 in (185 cm)
- Weight: 160 lb (73 kg; 11 st 6 lb)

Sport
- Sport: Swimming

Nicholas Andrew Schwab Alfaro (born 24 August 1990) is a Dominican Republic swimmer. He competed at the 2011 World Aquatics Championships in Shanghai in the Men's 200 and 400 metre freestyle, won three medals (gold, silver, and bronze), breaking the meet record in the 200 metre individual medley with a time of 2:08.90, at the 2011 CCCAN in Puerto Rico, and qualifying for the Guadalajara Pan-American Games. At the 2012 Summer Olympics he competed in the Men's 200 metre freestyle, winning his heat with a time of 1:53.41 and finishing in 37th place overall. Nicholas won four gold medals and one silver medal at the 2013 CCCAN in Costa Rica. He competed in the 2013 World Aquatic Championships in Barcelona in the Men's 200 and 400 metre freestyle. From 2010 to 2013, Nicholas attended Indiana University, graduating with a Bachelor of Arts and Sciences, and competed in swimming at the 2012 and 2013 Big Ten Swimming Championships and the 2013 NCAA Division I Championships in the 500 freestyle, qualifying with a time of 4:18.70. Nicholas currently holds the 200 and 400 metre freestyle national records in the Dominican Republic, with a time of 1:53.07 and 3:59.29.
