= Paola Pérez (swimmer) =

Venezuelan swimmer (born 1991)

Personal information
- Full name: Paola Valentina Pérez Sierra
- Born: 5 April 1991 (age 35) San Cristóbal, Táchira, Venezuela

Sport
- Sport: Swimming
Medal record
Representing Venezuela
Pan American Games
Silver medal – second place	2015 Toronto	10km marathon
Central American and Caribbean Games
Gold medal – first place	2023 Santa Tecla	5km open water
Gold medal – first place	2023 Santa Tecla	10km open water
Gold medal – first place	2026 Santo Domingo	10km open water
Silver medal – second place	2014 Veracruz	10km open water

Paola Valentina Pérez Sierra (born 5 April 1991) is a Venezuelan swimmer. She competed in the women's marathon 10 kilometre event at the 2016 Summer Olympics.

== Career ==
In 2019, she competed in the women's 5 km and women's 10 km events at the 2019 World Aquatics Championships held in Gwangju, South Korea. In the 5 km event she finished in 39th place and in the 10 km event she finished in 42nd place. In the same year, she also competed in the women's marathon 10 kilometres at the 2019 Pan American Games held in Lima, Peru. She finished in 11th place.
