= Swimming at the 2026 Summer Youth Olympics – Women's 200 metre backstroke =

Women's 200 metre backstroke at the 2026 Summer Youth Olympics
- Venue: Complexe Tour de l'Oeuf
- Dates: 1 November
- Competitors: 12 from 12 nations
- Winning time: 2:10.05

Medalists
| gold medal | Cecilia Dieleke | Argentina |
| silver medal | Eirini Zervou | Greece |
| bronze medal | Ofir Simcha | Israel |

The women's 200 metre backstroke event at the 2026 Summer Youth Olympics took place on 1 November 2026 at the Complexe Tour de l'Oeuf in Dakar, Senegal.

== Heats ==
The eight fastest swimmers advanced to the final. Qualifiers are highlighted in green.

| Rank | Heat | Name | Nationality | Time | Qualification |
|---|---|---|---|---|---|
| 1 | 2 | Cecilia Dieleke | Argentina | 2:13.73 | Q |
| 2 | 1 | Ofir Simcha | Israel | 2:18.18 | Q |
| 3 | 2 | Eirini Zervou | Greece | 2:18.22 | Q |
| 4 | 2 | Rebeka Tamás | Hungary | 2:20.14 | Q |
| 5 | 1 | Carolina Taveira | Portugal | 2:23.98 | Q |
| 6 | 1 | Greta Rossi | Italy | 2:24.30 | Q |
| 7 | 2 | Victoria Fernanda Garcia Caldera | Mexico | 2:28.04 | Q |
| 8 | 2 | Roselinda Matyayi | Namibia | 2:28.78 | Q |
| 9 | 1 | Gabriela Becerra | Colombia | 2:30.91 | |
| 10 | 2 | Kaila Dacruz | Cape Verde | 2:35.65 | |
| 11 | 1 | Crissa Denis Dillip | Tanzania | 2:36.81 | |
| 12 | 1 | Kalisa Keza | Rwanda | 3:06.58 | |

== Final ==
| Rank | Name | Nationality | Heats time | Final time |
|---|---|---|---|---|
| 1st place, gold medalist(s) | Cecilia Dieleke | Argentina | 2:13.73 | 2:10.05 |
| 2nd place, silver medalist(s) | Eirini Zervou | Greece | 2:18.22 | 2:15.52 |
| 3rd place, bronze medalist(s) | Ofir Simcha | Israel | 2:18.18 | 2:17.44 |
| 4 | Greta Rossi | Italy | 2:24.30 | 2:19.61 |
| 5 | Rebeka Tamás | Hungary | 2:20.14 | 2:19.83 |
| 6 | Carolina Taveira | Portugal | 2:23.98 | 2:22.65 |
| 7 | Victoria Fernanda Garcia Caldera | Mexico | 2:28.04 | 2:26.84 |
| 8 | Roselinda Matyayi | Namibia | 2:28.78 | 2:29.41 |
