= Héctor Ruvalcaba =

Mexican swimmer (born 1997)

Personal information
- Born: June 26, 1997 (age 29) Guadalajara, Mexico

Sport
- Sport: Swimming
- Strokes: Butterfly, medley
Medal record
Representing Mexico
Central American and Caribbean Games
Gold medal – first place	2023 Santa Tecla	4x200m freestyle relay
Silver medal – second place	2018 Barranquilla	200m butterfly
Bronze medal – third place	2018 Barranquilla	200m individual medley
Bronze medal – third place	2023 Santa Tecla	200m butterfly
Bronze medal – third place	2023 Santa Tecla	200m individual medley

Héctor Ruvalcaba Cruz (born 26 June 1997) is a Mexican male swimmer who competed at the collegiate level for the Incarnate Word Cardinals.

Born in Guadalajara, Ruvalcaba began swimming at age eight and moved to Tijuana with his family as a teenager.

Ruvalcaba started competing at the international level in the 2017 Summer Universiade. He won a silver medal in the 200m butterfly and a bronze in the 200m individual medley at the 2018 Central American and Caribbean Games. He later competed at the 2019 Pan American Games, where he reached two finals. During the COVID-19 pandemic, Ruvalcaba returned home to Tijuana to train in hopes of qualifying for the delayed 2020 Summer Olympics. He joined the LA Current for the 2021 International Swimming League.
