= Celia Pulido =

Mexican swimmer (born 2003)

Personal information
- Full name: Celia Pulido Ortiz
- Nationality: Mexican
- Born: 1 January 2003 (age 23) León, Guanajuato, Mexico

Sport
- Sport: Swimming
- Strokes: Backstroke; butterfly; freestyle
- College team: Southern Illinois
Medal record
Central American and Caribbean Games
Gold medal – first place	2026 Santo Domingo	50 m backstroke
Gold medal – first place	2026 Santo Domingo	100 m backstroke
Gold medal – first place	2026 Santo Domingo	100 m freestyle
Gold medal – first place	2026 Santo Domingo	4 × 100 m freestyle relay
Gold medal – first place	2026 Santo Domingo	4 × 200 m freestyle relay
Gold medal – first place	2026 Santo Domingo	4 × 100 m medley relay
Gold medal – first place	2026 Santo Domingo	Mixed 4 × 100 m freestyle relay
Gold medal – first place	2026 Santo Domingo	Mixed 4 × 100 m medley relay
Silver medal – second place	2026 Santo Domingo	50 m freestyle
Bronze medal – third place	2026 Santo Domingo	50 m butterfly
Bronze medal – third place	2026 Santo Domingo	200 m backstroke
Junior Pan American Games
Gold medal – first place	2025 Asunción	100 m backstroke
Silver medal – second place	2025 Asunción	4 × 100 m freestyle relay
Bronze medal – third place	2025 Asunción	4 × 100 m medley relay
Bronze medal – third place	2025 Asunción	Mixed 4 × 100 m freestyle relay

Celia Pulido Ortiz (born 1 January 2003) is a Mexican swimmer. She competed in the 2024 Summer Olympics and 2026 Central American and Caribbean Games. She competed at the collegiate level for Southern Illinois.

== Career ==
Nicknamed the Sirena Leonesa ('Leonese Mermaid'), Pulido began practicing swimming at age 9 and debuted in a competition in her hometown of León, Guanajuato.

Pulido had been part of the Southern Illinois University Carbondale swim team. She also participated in the 2019 Pan American Games in the 4x100 relay event.

Pulido qualified for the 2024 Summer Olympics in the World Aquatics ranking in the 100-meter backstroke and finished seventh in the 100-meter backstroke with a time of 1:01.10 minutes. She was the only female swimmer in her country to compete in the pool at the Paris Olympics.

During the 2025 Junior Pan American Games, Pulido won the gold medal in the 100 m backstroke. She also won a silver medal in the women's 4 × 100 m freestyle relay, and a bronze medal in the 4 × 100 m medley relay and mixed 4 × 100 m freestyle relay.

At the 2026 Central American and Caribbean Games, Pulido competed in multiple events. On 28 July, she won a silver medal in the 50 m freestyle and a gold medal in the 4 × 200 m freestyle relay. The following day, she won a gold medal in the 100 m freestyle. On 30 July, Pulido won a gold medal in the 50 m backstroke and mixed 4 × 100 m medley relay. On 31 July, she won a gold medal in the 100 m backstroke and mixed 4 × 100 m freestyle relay. On her last day of competition, she won a bronze medal in the 50 m butterfly and 200 m backstroke and a gold medal in the 4 × 100 m freestyle relay.
