= Isaza =

Isaza is a surname of Basque origins. Notable people with this surname include:

- Carlos Alberto Restrepo Isaza (born 1961), Colombian-born football coach and current manager
- Guillermo Cano Isaza (1925–1986), Colombian journalist
- Gustavo Isaza Mejía (died 2007), Colombian physician, surgeon and professor
- Harold Isaza Gutiérrez (born 1995), Colombian professional footballer
- Jorge García Isaza (1928–2016), Colombian Roman Catholic bishop
- José Isaza (born 1972), Panamanian swimmer
- Kaleil Isaza Tuzman, American-born entrepreneur associated with digital media
- Ilean Isaza Aizpurúa (1970), Panamanian born Archaeologist and Program Manager
