= 2024 South American Swimming Championships =

46th edition of South American Swimming Championships

XLVI South American Swimming Championships
- Host city: Cali, Colombia
- Date: 24–27 September
- Venue(s): Unidad Deportiva Panamericana Jaime Aparicio; Calima Lake
- Nations: 12
- Events: 42

The 46th South American Swimming Championships were held from 24 to 27 September in Cali, Colombia, being the second time the championships take place in Cali after 1960 as well as the seventh time Colombia hosts the competition.

All events took place at the Hernando Botero O'Byrne and Alberto Galindo pools within the Unidad Deportiva Panamericana Jaime Aparicio, except for the open water swimming events which were held at Calima Lake.

== Participating countries ==
- Argentina
- Bolivia
- Brazil
- Chile
- Colombia
- Ecuador
- Guyana
- Paraguay
- Peru
- Suriname
- Uruguay
- Venezuela

== Results ==
=== Men's events ===
| Event | Gold | | Silver | | Bronze | |
|---|---|---|---|---|---|---|
| 50 m freestyle | Diego Aranda (URU) | 22.54 | Pedro Spajari (BRA) | 22.75 | Jorge Otaiza (VEN) | 23.43 |
| 100 m freestyle | Kauã Pereira (BRA) | 50.29 | Pedro Teixeira (BRA) | 50.35 | Cardenio Fernández (COL) | 50.46 |
| 200 m freestyle | Stephan Steverink (BRA) | 1:48.97 | Juan Morales (COL) | 1:49.86 | Joaquín Vargas (PER) | 1:51.41 |
| 400 m freestyle | Stephan Steverink (BRA) | 3:51.70 | Juan Morales (COL) | 3:55.86 | Caue Gluck (BRA) | 3:57.94 |
| 800 m freestyle | Thiago Rufini (BRA) | 8:03.69 | Ronaldo Zambrano (VEN) | 8:10.03 | Juan Morales (COL) | 8:13.76 |
| 1500 m freestyle | Thiago Rufini (BRA) | 15:28.81 | Pedro Guastelli (BRA) | 15:31.64 | Ronaldo Zambrano (VEN) | 15:43.58 |
| 50 m backstroke | Pedro Figueiredo (BRA) | 25.55 | Charles Hockin (PAR) | 26.04 | Gabriel Castillo (COL) | 26.16 |
| 100 m backstroke | Pedro Figueiredo (BRA) | 56.07 | Samuel Lopes (BRA) | 56.79 | Edhy Vargas (CHI) | 56.84 |
| 200 m backstroke | Samuel Lopes (BRA) | 2:03.26 | David Céspedes (COL) | 2:03.39 | Edhy Vargas (CHI) | 2:04.10 |
| 50 m breaststroke | Jorge Murillo (COL) | 28.02 | Guilherme Godoy (BRA) | 28.24 | Caio Rodrigues (BRA) | 28.46 |
| 100 m breaststroke | Jorge Murillo (COL) | 1:01.10 | Caio Rodrigues (BRA) | 1:01.53 | Guilherme Godoy (BRA) | 1:02.02 |
| 200 m breaststroke | Guilherme Godoy (BRA) | 2:14.78 | Jorge Murillo (COL) | 2:15.27 | Vicente Villanueva (CHI) | 2:15.71 |
| 50 m butterfly | Ulises Casau (ARG) | 23.96 | Jorge Otaiza (VEN) | 23.85 | Lucio Flavio de Paula (BRA) | 24.12 |
| 100 m butterfly | Jorge Otaiza (VEN) | 52.91 | Lucio Flavio de Paula (BRA) | 53.27 | Ulises Casau (ARG) | 53.54 |
| 200 m butterfly | David Arias (COL) | 2:01.43 | Gustavo Saldo (BRA) | 2:01.73 | Francisco Vullo (ARG) | 2:01.75 |
| 200 m individual medley | Stephan Steverink (BRA) | 2:03.53 | Guilherme Kanzler (BRA) | 2:06.01 | Winston Rodriguez (VEN) | 2:08.07 |
| 400 m individual medley | Stephan Steverink (BRA) | 4:22.36 | Sebastián Camacho (COL) | 4:33.76 | Ian Ricci (PER) | 4:39.47 |
| 4 × 100 m freestyle relay | Brazil; Pedro Spajari (49.27); Pedro Teixeira (49.87); Lucio Flavio de Paula (18.29); Kauã Pereira (1:22.45) | 3:19.87 | Venezuela; Dennis Pérez (49.91); Jorge Otaiza (50.43); Emil Pérez (51.16); Jesús López (51.06) | 3:22.56 | Colombia; Cardenio Fernández (50.15 NR); Camilo Marrugo (51.15); Sebastián Camacho (51.49); Juan Morales (50.81) | 3:23.60 |
| 4 × 200 m freestyle relay | Brazil; Caue Gluck (1:51.45); Samuel Lopes (1:52.48); Gustavo Saldo (1:51.82); Stephan Steverink (1:49.78) | 7:25.53 | Colombia; Cardenio Fernández (1:52.85); Juan Morales (1:51.71); Victor Rosado (1:52.79); Sebastián Camacho (1:53.23) | 7:30.58 | Venezuela; Francisco Zambrano (1:53.52); Dennis Pérez (1:52.48); Winston Rodríguez (1:54.31); Emil Pérez (1:55.53) | 7:35.84 |
| 4 × 100 m medley relay | Brazil; Pedro Figueiredo (56.60); Caio Rodrigues (1:02.01); Lucio Flavio de Paula (53.22); Pedro Spajari (49.34) | 3:41.17 | Colombia; David Céspedes (57.20); Jorge Murillo (1:00.72); David Arias (53.51); Cardenio Fernández (50.03) | 3:41.46 | Chile; Edhy Vargas (57.37); Vicente Villanueva (1:02.66); Benjamin Schnapp (54.09); Elias Ardiles (50.86) | 3:44.98 |

=== Women's events ===
| Event | Gold | | Silver | | Bronze | |
|---|---|---|---|---|---|---|
| 50 m freestyle | Lismar Lyon (VEN) | 26.01 | Andrea Berrino (ARG) | 26.05 | Rafaela Fernandini (PER) | 26.32 |
| 100 m freestyle | Celine Souza (BRA) | 56.45 | Bárbara Muñoz (COL) | 56.83 | Rafaela Fernandini (PER) | 57.12 |
| 200 m freestyle | Tiffany Murillo (COL) | 2:02.08 | Thaiana Gabriel do Amaral (BRA) | 2:04.07 | Carolina Daher (BRA) | 2:04.32 |
| 400 m freestyle | Tiffany Murillo (COL) | 4:16.63 | Aline Rodrigues (BRA) | 4:19.08 | Leticia Fassina (BRA) | 4:22.00 |
| 800 m freestyle | Kristel Köbrich (CHI) | 8:40.84 | Leticia Fassina (BRA) | 8:49.86 | Tiffany Murillo (COL) | 8:51.53 |
| 1500 m freestyle | Kristel Köbrich (CHI) | 16:31.75 | Leticia Fassina (BRA) | 16:34.31 | Tiffany Murillo (COL) | 16:58.60 |
| 50 m backstroke | Andrea Berrino (ARG) | 29.08 | Julia Ferreira (BRA) | 29.25 | Maria Luiza Pessanha (BRA) | 29.47 |
| 100 m backstroke | Andrea Berrino (ARG) | 1:02.67 | Maria Luiza Pessanha (BRA) | 1:02.99 | Jazmín Pistelli (COL) | 1:03.19 |
| 200 m backstroke | Alexia Sotomayor (PER) | 2:17.02 | Jazmín Pistelli (COL) | 2:17.33 | Alexia Assunção (BRA) | 2:17.75 |
| 50 m breaststroke | Macarena Ceballos (ARG) | 31.34 | Stefanía Gómez (COL) | 31.41 NR | Bruna Leme (BRA) | 31.70 |
| 100 m breaststroke | Macarena Ceballos (ARG) | 1:08.01 | Gabriela Assis (BRA) | 1:09.60 | Martina Barbeiro (ARG) | 1:10.29 |
| 200 m breaststroke | Gabrielle Assis (BRA) | 2:28.55 | Martina Barbeito (ARG) | 2:32.38 | Bruna Leme (BRA) | 2:35.32 |
| 50 m butterfly | Celine Souza (BRA) | 26.99 | Lismar Lyon (VEN) | 26.48 | Beatriz Bezerra (BRA) | 27.33 |
| 100 m butterfly | Lismar Lyon (VEN) | 1:00.08 | Celine Souza (BRA) | 1:00.96 | Beatriz Bezerra (BRA) | 1:01.26 |
| 200 m butterfly | Samantha Baños (COL) | 2:15.00 | Yasmin Silva (PER) | 2:15.37 | Ana Julia Aguiar (BRA) | 2:16.46 |
| 200 m individual medley | Nathalia Siqueira (BRA); Bruna Leme (BRA) | 2:17.85 | Laura Melo (COL) | 2:18.60 | Not awarded | |
| 400 m individual medley | Agatha Amaral (BRA) | 4:55.16 | Bruna Leme (BRA) | 4:55.40 | Magdalena Walter (ARG) | 4:58.93 |
| 4 × 100 m freestyle relay | Brazil; Nathalia Siqueira (57.06); Celine Souza (57.04); Beatriz Bezerra (57.47); Aline Rodrigues (56.85) | 3:48.42 | Colombia; Bárbara Muñoz (56.86); Stefanía Gómez (57.41); Sirena Rowe (58.05); Tiffany Murillo (57.74) | 3:50.06 | Argentina; Andrea Berrino (57.42); Magdalena Walter (57.99); Macarena Ceballos (59.59); Lucia Gauna (57.82) | 3:52.82 |
| 4 × 200 m freestyle relay | Brazil; Thaiana Gabriel do Amaral (2:04.40); Nathalia Siqueira (2:03.59); Leticia Fassina (2:07.05); Aline Rodrigues (2:05.19) | 8:20.23 | Colombia; Isabella Budnik (2:07.11); Bárbara Muñoz (2:08.43); Stefanía Gómez (2:06.28); Tiffany Murillo (2:03.20) | 8:25.02 | Argentina; Magdalena Walter (2:06.70); Cecilia Dieleke (2:12.14); Martina Barbeito (2:06.64); Lucía Gauna (2:07.93) | 8:33.41 |
| 4 × 100 m medley relay | Brazil; Maria Luiza Passanha (1:03.52); Gabrielle Assis (1:09.88); Beatriz Bezerra (1:01.49); Celine Souza (56.68) | 4:11.57 | Colombia; Jazmín Pistelli (1:04.70); Stefanía Gómez (1:09.68); Laura Melo (1:01.80); Bárbara Muñoz (57.19) | 4:13.37 | Argentina; Andrea Merrino (1:03.53); Macarena Ceballos (1:08.70); Magdalena Walter (1:04.19); Lucía Gauna (57.11) | 4:13.53 |

=== Mixed events ===
| Games | Gold | | Silver | | Bronze | |
|---|---|---|---|---|---|---|
| 4 × 100 m freestyle relay | Brazil; Kauã Pereira (50.50); Pedro Teixeira (50.70); Aline Rodrigues (57.33); Celine Souza (57.17) | 3:35.70 | Colombia; Cardenio Fernández (50.67); Sebastián Camacho (50.98); Stefanía Gómez (57.40); Bárbara Muñoz (58.73) | 3:37.78 | Venezuela; Dennis Pérez (50.48); Lismar Lyon (27.69); Carla González (1:29.50); Jorge Otaiza (50.35) | 3:38.02 |
| 4 × 100 m medley relay | Brazil; Maria Luiza Pessanha (1:03.50); Guilherme Godoy (1:01.80); Lucio Flavio de Paula (53.06); Celine Souza (56.70) | 3:55.06 | Colombia; Jazmín Pistelli (1:03.78); Jorge Murillo (1:01.44); David Arias (53.26); Bárbara Muñoz (56.93) | 3:55.41 | Peru; Alexia Sotomayor (1:04.22); Ian Ricci (1:03.55); Diego Balbi (53.30); Rafaela Fernandini (57.02) | 3:58.29 NR |

== Medal standings ==
* Host nation (Colombia)

| Rank | Nation | Gold | Silver | Bronze | Total |
|---|---|---|---|---|---|
| 1 | Brazil (BRA) | 26 | 21 | 14 | 61 |
| 2 | Colombia (COL)* | 6 | 14 | 8 | 28 |
| 3 | Argentina (ARG) | 5 | 3 | 10 | 18 |
| 4 | Venezuela (VEN) | 3 | 5 | 4 | 12 |
| 5 | Ecuador (ECU) | 2 | 1 | 1 | 4 |
| 6 | Chile (CHI) | 2 | 0 | 4 | 6 |
| 7 | Peru (PER) | 1 | 1 | 5 | 7 |
| 8 | Uruguay (URU) | 1 | 0 | 0 | 1 |
| 9 | Paraguay (PAR) | 0 | 1 | 0 | 1 |
| Totals (9 entries) | | 46 | 46 | 46 | 138 |
