= Swimming at the 2014 South American Games – Men's 100 metre backstroke =

Men's 100 metre backstroke at the 2014 South American Games
- Venue: Estadio Nacional
- Dates: March 8, 2014 (heats & finals)
- Competitors: 14 from 8 nations
- Winning time: 54.31

Medalists
gold medal	Albert Subirats	Venezuela
silver medal	Federico Grabich	Argentina
bronze medal	Fernando dos Santos	Brazil

The men's 100 metre backstroke competition at the 2014 South American Games took place on March 8 at the Estadio Nacional. The last champion was Guilherme Guido of Brazil.

This race consisted of two lengths of the pool, all in backstroke.

== Records ==
Prior to this competition, the existing world and Pan Pacific records were as follows:

World record	Aaron Peirsol (USA)	51.94	Indianapolis, United States	July 8, 2009
South American Games record	Guilherme Guido (BRA)	55.14	Medellín, Colombia	March 27, 2010

== Results ==
All times are in minutes and seconds.

KEY:	q	Fastest non-qualifiers	Q	Qualified	CR	Championships record	NR	National record	PB	Personal best	SB	Seasonal best

=== Heats ===
The first round was held on March 8, at 11:25.

Rank	Heat	Lane	Name	Nationality	Time	Notes
1	1	4	Federico Grabich	Argentina	56.66	Q
2	2	4	Fernando dos Santos	Brazil	56.87	Q
3	1	3	Albert Subirats	Venezuela	56.94	Q
4	2	5	Thiago Pereira	Brazil	57.06	Q
5	2	3	Benjamin Hockin	Paraguay	57.29	Q
6	1	5	Charles Hockin	Paraguay	57.88	Q
7	2	2	Agustín Hernandez	Argentina	58.38	Q
8	1	6	David Céspedes	Colombia	58.42	Q
9	2	6	Jesus Daniel Lopez	Venezuela	59.22	
10	1	2	Carlos Polit Carvajal	Ecuador	59.52	
11	2	7	Andrew Rutherfurd	Bolivia	1:00.04	
12	1	7	Benjamin Quintanilla Arias	Chile	1:00.37	
13	2	1	Eduardo Opazo Rojas	Chile	1:02.53	
14	1	1	Jose Quintanilla Moreno	Bolivia	1:03.13	

=== Final ===
The final was held on March 8, at 19:41.

Rank	Lane	Name	Nationality	Time	Notes
1st place, gold medalist(s)	3	Albert Subirats	Venezuela	54.31	CR, NR
2nd place, silver medalist(s)	4	Federico Grabich	Argentina	55.22	
3rd place, bronze medalist(s)	5	Fernando dos Santos	Brazil	55.27	
4	6	Thiago Pereira	Brazil	55.49	
5	2	Benjamin Hockin	Paraguay	56.90	
6	7	Charles Hockin	Paraguay	58.13	
7	1	Agustín Hernandez	Argentina	58.52	
8	8	David Céspedes	Colombia	58.85	
