= Vanessa Rivas =

Dominican Republic swimmer (born 1996)

Personal information
- Born: 25 July 1996 (age 29)

Sport
- Sport: Swimming

Vanessa Rivas (born 25 July 1996) is a Dominican Republic swimmer. She competed in the women's 100 metre breaststroke event at the 2017 World Aquatics Championships.
