= Sirena Rowe =

Colombian swimmer (born 1998)

Personal information
- Full name: Sirena Carolina Rowe Cervantes
- Nationality: Colombian-American
- Born: 28 February 1998 (age 28)
- Height: 1.75 m (5 ft 9 in)
- Weight: 70 kg (150 lb)

Sport
- Sport: Swimming
- Strokes: Freestyle; Butterfly; Backstroke
- College team: North Carolina State University
Medal record
Representing Colombia
Women's swimming
Event	1st	2nd	3rd
CAC Games	1	9	2
South American Games	0	3	1
South American Championships	0	1	0
Bolivarian Games	2	2	0
Total	3	15	3
Central American and Caribbean Games
Gold medal – first place	2026 Santo Domingo	50 m freestyle
Silver medal – second place	2018 Barranquilla	4×100 m freestyle
Silver medal – second place	2018 Barranquilla	4×100 m mixed freestyle
Silver medal – second place	2018 Barranquilla	4×100 m mixed medley
Silver medal – second place	2023 San Salvador	4×100 m medley
Silver medal – second place	2023 San Salvador	4×100 m mixed freestyle
Silver medal – second place	2026 Santo Domingo	4×100 m freestyle
Silver medal – second place	2026 Santo Domingo	4×100 m medley
Silver medal – second place	2026 Santo Domingo	4×100 m mixed freestyle
Silver medal – second place	2026 Santo Domingo	4×100 m mixed medley
Bronze medal – third place	2018 Barranquilla	4×100 m medley
Bronze medal – third place	2023 San Salvador	4×100 m freestyle
South American Games
Silver medal – second place	2022 Asunción	50 m butterfly
Silver medal – second place	2026 Santa Fe	50 m freestyle
Silver medal – second place	2026 Santa Fe	4×100 m medley
Bronze medal – third place	2026 Santa Fe	50 m butterfly
South American Championships
Silver medal – second place	2024 Cali	4×100 m freestyle
Bolivarian Games
Gold medal – first place	2022 Valledupar	50 m freestyle
Gold medal – first place	2025 Lima-Ayacucho	4×100 m freestyle
Silver medal – second place	2025 Lima-Ayacucho	50 m freestyle
Silver medal – second place	2025 Lima-Ayacucho	50 m butterfly
Colombia National Championships
Gold medal – first place	2021	50 m butterfly
Silver medal – second place	2021	50 m freestyle
Silver medal – second place	2021	50 m backstroke
Campeonato Internacional Interclubes - SCM
Gold medal – first place	2022	100 m freestyle
Gold medal – first place	2022	50 m backstroke
Gold medal – first place	2022	50 m butterfly
Gold medal – first place	2022	50 m freestyle
NCAA (with NCSU)
Gold medal – first place	2021	4×50 y medley relay
Bronze medal – third place	2021	4×50 y free relay
Atlantic Coast Conference (with NCSU)
Silver medal – second place	2021	4×50 y free relay
Silver medal – second place	2021	4×100 y free relay
Silver medal – second place	2020	4×50 y medley relay
Bronze medal – third place	2020	4×50 y free relay
Gold medal – first place	2019	4×50 y medley relay
Gold medal – first place	2019	4×50 y free relay
Conference USA (with Marshall)
Silver medal – second place	2017	100 y freestyle
Silver medal – second place	2017	4×100 y free relay
Silver medal – second place	2017	50 y freestyle
Silver medal – second place	2017	4×50 y free relay
Bronze medal – third place	2017	4×50 y medley relay
Bronze medal – third place	2017	4×50 y medley relay

Sirena Rowe (born 28 February 1998) is a Colombian swimmer.

== Swimming career ==
=== Club ===
Rowe began swimming competitively for NOMAD of the North Carolina LSC located in Mecklenburg County in the greater Charlotte area. She finished her club years as a North Carolina Swimming champion in the 50 free both short-course-yards and long-course-meters in 2016.

=== Collegiate ===
Rowe enrolled for the 2016–2017 season at Marshall University and made an immediate impact. Rowe was twice named Conference USA Swimmer of the Week: on 24 January 2017 and 31 January 2017, and at the end of the 2017 season was named Conference USA Freshman Swimmer of the Year. Rowe finished her freshman campaign with school records in the 50 Freestyle, 100 Freestyle, and 100 Backstroke as well as shared records in the 200 Freestyle Relay, 200 Medley Relay and 400 Freestyle Relay. As a member of the Thundering Herd, Rowe qualified for the NCAA Championships in the 50 yard freestyle. where she finished 35th. Additionally, Rowe placed 51st in the 100 Backstroke and 52nd in the 100 Freestyle.

After the 2017 season, Rowe transferred to North Carolina State University and sat out a year due to student-athlete transfer rules.

At the 2019 ACC Championships, Rowe placed seventh in the 50 freestyle (22.29) and 21st in both the 100 freestyle (49.69) and the 100 butterfly (54.21). Additionally, Rowe was on the 200 Medley Relay and 200 Freestyle Relay for the Wolfpack that set the program, ACC and meet records in those events.

At the 2020 ACC Championships, Rowe competed in the 200 Medley Relay (2nd - 22.64[fly], 1:34.38), 50 Freestyle (15th - 22.66), 200 Free Relay (22.09/1:27.50), 100 Butterfly (28th - 54.98), and the 100 Freestyle (33rd - 50.43). The relay times posted would qualify with (A) standards for the NCAA Championships. The COVID-19 pandemic prevented the NCAA championships from being contested. Rowe was named to the All-America team for her efforts in achieving the A cuts for the 200 Medley and 200 Free Relays.

In her final collegiate season, Rowe again earned two All-America honors for the 200 Free Relay (3rd place at NCAA) and the 200 Medley Relay swimming the butterfly leg in an effort that would win the NCAA title in the event. At the ACC Championship, Rowe swam the 200 Free Relay and 400 Free Relay which each placed 2nd.

=== International ===
Sirena Rowe represents the Colombian Swimming Federation in International Competition. Her mother is Colombian-born which provides dual-citizenship.

==== 2018 Central American and Caribbean Games ====
Rowe competed in the Women's 50 meter freestyle, 100 meter freestyle, and 50 meter butterfly events as well as four relays for Colombia at the 2018 Central American and Caribbean Games. Rowe won a total of four medals at these games (3 silver, 1 bronze) all on relays.

==== 2019 FINA World Championships ====
The Colombian Swimming Federation selected Rowe to compete at the 2019 FINA World Championships in Gwangju, South Korea (see: Colombia at the 2019 World Aquatics Championships.) Rowe competed in the 100 meter Freestyle finishing 45th (57.42) and the 50 meter Butterfly finishing 31st (27.02).

==== 2019 Pan American Games ====
Rowe competed in the 2019 Pan American Games in Lima, Peru. Rowe swam on the 5th place Mixed 4 × 100 m Medley Relay, and finished 14th in the 50 m freestyle and 11th in the 100 m freestyle.

==== 2021 Colombian National Championships ====
At the 2021 Colombian Nationals, Rowe had a successful meet finishing on the podium in all four individual events.

==== 2022 South American Games ====
Paraguay hosted the 2022 South American Games, and Rowe earned a silver medal in the 50 m butterfly. Her 4x100 freestyle relays (each women's and mixed) placed 4th.

==== 2022 FINA World Championships (25m) ====
At the FINA Short Course World Championships in Melbourne, Australia, Rowe finished 22nd, and 27th in the 50 m butterfly and 50 m freestyle, respectively. She additionally swam on two top-16 mixed relays, finishing 14th in the mixed 4x50 free relay, and 16th in the mixed 4x50 medley relay.
