= Swimming at the 2023 Central American and Caribbean Games =

- Venue: Complejo Acuático Ciudad Merliot; Lago Ilopango
- Location: (El Salvador) Lago Ilopango; Santa Tecla
- Dates: 24–28 June; 5–7 July

The swimming competition at the 2023 Central American and Caribbean Games will be held at the Complejo Acuático Ciudad Merliot in Santa Tecla, El Salvador from 24 to 28 June. Open water swimming events will be held on 5 to 7 July at Lago Ilopango.

== Medal table ==
* Host nation (El Salvador)

Rank	Nation	Gold	Silver	Bronze	Total
1	Mexico (MEX)	20	20	14	54
2	Colombia (COL)	6	8	10	24
3	Venezuela (VEN)	6	5	8	19
4	Cuba (CUB)	4	1	2	7
5	Puerto Rico (PUR)	3	3	3	9
6	Trinidad and Tobago (TTO)	3	2	2	7
7	Centro Caribe Sports (CCS)	3	0	0	3
8	Aruba (ARU)	2	4	0	6
9	Bahamas (BAH)	1	0	1	2
10	Bermuda (BER)	0	2	1	3
11	Panama (PAN)	0	1	0	1
12	Honduras (HON)	0	0	3	3
13	Dominican Republic (DOM)	0	0	2	2
14	Costa Rica (CRC)	0	0	1	1
Totals (14 entries)		48	46	47	141

== Medal summary ==
=== Men's events ===
Event	Gold		Silver		Bronze	
50m freestyle	Dylan Carter (TTO)	21.87 GR	Mikel Schreuders (ARU)	22.43	Lamar Taylor (BAH)	22.51
100m freestyle	Dylan Carter (TTO)	48.49 GR	Mikel Schreuders (ARU)	49.17	Jorge Iga (MEX)	49.38
200m freestyle	Jorge Iga (MEX)	1:47.97	Nikoli Blackman (TTO)	1:50.41	Hector Ruvalcaba (MEX)	1:50.92
400m freestyle	Juan Morales (COL)	3:53.06	Jose Cano (MEX)	3:56.44	Sebastián Camacho (COL)	3:59.23
800m freestyle	Juan Morales (COL)	8:12.77	Jose Cano (MEX)	8:14.37	Sebastián Camacho (COL)	8:18.93
1500m freestyle	Juan Morales (COL)	15:50.56	José Cano (MEX)	15:51.64	Christian Bayo (PUR)	15:58.15
50m backstroke	Lamar Taylor (BAH)	25.08	Dylan Carter (TTO)	25.55	Diego Camacho (MEX)	25.68
100m backstroke	Omar Pinzón (COL)	55.60	Yeziel Morales (PUR)	56.05	Diego Camacho (MEX)	56.10
200m backstroke	Patrick Groters (ARU)	2:00.26	Yeziel Morales (PUR)	2:00.70	Omar Pinzón (COL)	2:01.51
50m breaststroke	Miguel de Lara (MEX); Mikel Schreuders (ARU)	27.51 GR	None awarded		Julio Horrego (HON)	27.86
100m breaststroke	Miguel de Lara (MEX)	1:00.23 GR	Andres Puente (MEX)	1:01.62	Julio Horrego (HON)	1:02.14
200m breaststroke	Miguel de Lara (MEX)	2:10.85 GR	Andres Puente (MEX)	2:12.70	Julio Horrego (HON)	2:15.70
50m butterfly	Dylan Carter (TTO)	23.32	Mikel Schreuders (ARU)	23.90	Andres Dupont (MEX)	24.19
100m butterfly	Jorge Otaiza (VEN)	53.37	David Arias (COL)	53.59	Jorge Iga (MEX)	53.61
200m butterfly	Erick Gordillo (CCS)	1:58.41	Yeziel Morales (PUR)	1:59.05	Héctor Ruvalcaba (MEX)	1:59.59
200m individual medley	Erick Gordillo (CCS)	2:00.97 GR	Patrick Groters (ARU)	2:01.39	José Martínez (MEX)	2:01.76
400m individual medley	Erick Gordillo (CCS)	4:21.12	Maximiliano Vega (MEX)	4:24.19	Héctor Ruvalcaba (MEX)	4:26.58
4 × 100 m freestyle relay	Mexico (MEX); Jose Martinez; Jorge Iga; Andres Dupont; Diego Camacho	3:20.20	Venezuela (VEN); Diego Mas; Jorge Otaiza; Jesús López; Emil Pérez	3:21.87	Trinidad and Tobago (TTO); Graham Chatoor; Dylan Carter; Nikoli Blackman; Zarek Wilson	3:22.33
4 × 200 m freestyle relay	Mexico (MEX); José Cano; Héctor Ruvalcaba; Andrés Dupont; Jorge Iga	7:22.94 GR	Colombia (COL); Juan Morales; Sebastián Camacho; Santiago Arteaga; Santiago Corredor	7:28.52	Venezuela (VEN); Emil Pérez; Eric Veit; Jorge Otaiza; Jesús López	7:45.64
4 × 100 m medley relay	Mexico (MEX); Diego Camacho; Miguel De Lara; Ascanio Fernandez; Jorge Iga	3:39.54 GR	Venezuela (VEN); Jesus Lopez; Eric Veit; Jorge Otaiza; Emil Perez	3:46.86	Dominican Republic (DOM); Anthony Piñeiro; Andrés Martijena; Javier Núñez; Denzel González	3:51.86
5 km open water	Diego Vera (VEN)	57:22.6	Daniel Delgadillo (MEX)	57:29.5	Rodolfo Falcon (CUB)	57:29.8
10 km open water	Paulo Strehlke (MEX)	1:58:00.7	Daniel Delgadillo (MEX)	1:58:14.0	Diego Vera (VEN)	1:58:15.8

^{a} Swimmers who participated in the heats only and received medals.

=== Women's events ===
Event	Gold		Silver		Bronze	
50m freestyle	Tayde Revilak (MEX)	25.44	Madelyn Moore (BER)	25.79	Cherelle Thompson (TTO)	25.92
100m freestyle	Elisbet Gámez (CUB)	55.57	Athena Meneses (MEX)	56.39	Andrea Becali (CUB)	56.51
200m freestyle	Elisbet Gámez (CUB)	1:59.52	María Mata (MEX)	1:59.98	Andrea Becali (CUB)	2:00.70
400m freestyle	Karen Durango (COL)	4:15.56	Elisbet Gámez (CUB)	4:16.34	María Yegres (VEN)	4:18.19
800m freestyle	Maria Yegres (VEN)	8:49.86	Karen Durango (COL)	8:54.17	Maria Mata (MEX)	8:55.20
1500m freestyle	Maria Yegres (VEN)	16:58.21	Tiffany Murillo (COL)	17:08.06	Paola Pérez (VEN)	17:23.11
50m backstroke	Tayde Sansores (MEX)	28.59	Emma Harvey (BER)	29.01	Elizabeth Jiménez (DOM)	29.44
100m backstroke	Miranda Grana (MEX)	1:02.18	Athena Meneses (MEX)	1:02.62	Kristen Romano (PUR)	1:02.68
200m backstroke	Kristen Romano (PUR)	2:12.56	Athena Meneses (MEX)	2:15.06	Jazmín Pistelli (COL)	2:16.49
50m breaststroke	Mercedes Toledo (VEN)	31.86	Byanca Rodriguez (MEX)	31.92	Stefanía Gómez (COL)	32.11
100m breaststroke	Stefanía Gómez (COL)	1:08.97 NR	Byanca Rodríguez (MEX)	1:09.24	Mercedes Toledo (VEN)	1:10.77
200m breaststroke	Byanca Rodriguez (MEX)	2:30.56	Emily Santos (PAN)	2:30.93	Maria Jimenez (MEX)	2:32.82
50m butterfly	Tayde Sansores (MEX)	26.82	Lismar Lyon (VEN)	26.97	Emma Harvey (BER)	27.11
100m butterfly	Maria Mata (MEX)	59.63	Athena Meneses (MEX)	59.86	Karen Durango (COL)	1:00.08
200m butterfly	María Mata (MEX)	2:09.31	Karen Durango (COL)	2:14.00	Yanin Ortiz (CRC)	2:16.30
200m individual medley	Kristen Romano (PUR)	2:13.74 GR	Maria Mata (MEX)	2:17.67	Stefanía Gómez (COL)	2:18.42
400m individual medley	Kristen Romano (PUR)	4:45.47 GR	Karen Rodriguez (MEX)	4:59.60	Portia Brown (PUR)	4:59.81
4 × 100 m freestyle relay	Cuba (CUB); Elisbet Gamez; Andrea Becali; Lorena Gonzalez; Laurent Estrada	3:45.18 GR	Mexico (MEX); Tayde Revilak; Athena Meneses; Maria Mata; Maria Mendez; Miranda Grana; Tayde Sansores; Susana Hernandez	3:45.45	Colombia (COL); Isabella Bedoya; Daniela Gutiérrez; Karen Durango; Valentina Becerra; Sirena Rowe; Laura Melo	3:46.73
4 × 200 m freestyle relay	Cuba (CUB); Elisbet Gamez; Andrea Becali; Lorena Gonzalez; Laurent Estrada	8:10.47 GR	Mexico (MEX); Athena Meneses; Maria Mata; Maria Mendez; Karen Rodriguez; Tayde Revilak; Susana Hernandez	8:17.58	Colombia (COL); Isabella Bedoya; Tiffany Murillo; Daniela Gutiérrez; Karen Durango; Valentina Becerra; Laura Melo; Stefanía Gómez	8:22.69
4 × 100 m medley relay	Mexico (MEX); Tayde Revilak; Miranda Grana; Byanca Rodriguez; Maria Mata; Maria Mendez; Maria Jimenez; Tayde Sansores; Susana Hernandez	4:07.14 GR	Colombia (COL); Sirena Rowe; Jazmín Pistelli; Karen Durango; Valentina Becerra; Laura Melo; Stefanía Gómez	4:11.84	Venezuela (VEN); Maria Yegres; Lismar Lyon; Mercedes Toledo; Nicole Gutierrez	4:17.59
5 km open water	Paola Perez (VEN)	1:01:34.8	Martha Sandoval (MEX)	1:03:06.0	Paulina Alanis (MEX)	1:04:12.5
10 km open water	Paola Perez (VEN)	2:04:29.0	Martha Sandoval (MEX)	2:04:29.2	Paulina Alanis (MEX)	2:10:16.9

=== Mixed events ===
Event	Gold		Silver		Bronze	
4 × 100 m freestyle relay	Mexico (MEX); Tayde Revilak; Jorge Iga; Athena Meneses; Susana Hernandez; Jose Martinez; Maria Mendez; Andres Dupont	3:31.12 GR	Colombia (COL); Sirena Rowe; Isabella Bedoya; Stefanía Gómez; Juan Morales; Karen Durango; Valentina Becerra; Santiago Arteaga	3:35.01	Venezuela (VEN); Mercedes Toledo; Emil Perez; Fabiana Pesce; Maria Yegres; Diego Mas; Jesus Lopez	3:36.95
4 × 100 m medley relay	Mexico (MEX); Miranda Grana; Miguel de Lara; Athena Meneses; Jorge Iga	3:52.99	Colombia (COL); Omar Pinzón; Laura Melo; Esnaider Reales; Isabella Bedoya	3:59.02	Venezuela (VEN); Jesús López; Mercedes Toledo; Emil Pêrez; Fabiana Pesce	4:01.31
Open water relay	Mexico (MEX); Paulo Strehlke; Martha Sandoval; Paulina Alanis; Daniel Delgadillo	57:11.3	Venezuela (VEN); Paola Perez; Diego Vera; Ruthseli Aponte; Johndry Segovvia	58:11.4	Colombia (COL); Fredy Arevalo; Sofia Ospina; Juan Jose Castro; Mariana Libreros	59:05.9

^{b} Swimmers who participated in the heats only and received medals.
