= Gustavo Isaza Mejía =

Colombian physician and surgeon

- Born
- Died: 13 January 2007
- Occupation: Physician

Gustavo Isaza Mejía (born in Salamina, Caldas, and died 13 January 2007) was a Colombian physician, surgeon and professor at the University of Antioquia.

In 1940, Isaza Mejía examined the use of pituitrin in obstetrics in his work Algunas consideraciones sobre el uso de la pituitrina en obstetricia (published by Antioquia, 1940) and founded the cytologic laboratory of the University Hospital of San Vicente de Paúl in Medellín, and introduced the exfoliative cytology in Colombia in 1949. Mejía wrote, among other things, an orientation and guidance for women and mothers: Maternidad y menstruación sin dolor: la educación de los hijos (publisher Bedout, 1960).

He was an editor of the Revista Latino Americana de Hipnosis Clínica.
