= David Arias =

Colombian swimmer (born 1995)

Personal information
- Full name: David Arias González
- Nationality: Colombia
- Born: 23 August 1995 (age 31)
- Height: 1.79 m (5 ft 10 in)
- Weight: 85 kg (187 lb)

Sport
- Sport: Swimming
- Strokes: Butterfly
- Club: Club Natacion Flamingo Risaralda
Medal record
Representing Colombia
Men's swimming
Event	1st	2nd	3rd
CAC Games	0	4	1
South American Games	0	3	3
South American Championships	1	2	5
Bolivarian Games	2	4	1
Total	3	13	10
Central American and Caribbean Games
Silver medal – second place	2018 Barranquilla	4×100 m mixed freestyle
Silver medal – second place	2023 San Salvador	100 m butterfly
Silver medal – second place	2026 Santo Domingo	4×200 m freestyle
Silver medal – second place	2026 Santo Domingo	4×100 m mixed medley
Bronze medal – third place	2026 Santo Domingo	4×100 m medley
South American Games
Silver medal – second place	2018 Cochabamba	200 m butterfly
Silver medal – second place	2022 Asunción	100 m butterfly
Silver medal – second place	2026 Santa Fe	4×200 m freestyle
Bronze medal – third place	2018 Cochabamba	4×100 m freestyle
Bronze medal – third place	2018 Cochabamba	4×200 m freestyle
Bronze medal – third place	2022 Asunción	200 m butterfly
South American Championships
Gold medal – first place	2024 Cali	200 m butterfly
Silver medal – second place	2024 Cali	4×100 m medley
Silver medal – second place	2024 Cali	4×100 m mixed medley
Bronze medal – third place	2016 Asunción	4×200 m freestyle
Bronze medal – third place	2018 Trujillo	4×100 m freestyle
Bronze medal – third place	2018 Trujillo	4×200 m freestyle
Bronze medal – third place	2018 Trujillo	4×100 m medley
Bronze medal – third place	2018 Trujillo	4×100 m mixed freestyle
Bolivarian Games
Gold medal – first place	2025 Lima-Ayacucho	4×100 m medley
Gold medal – first place	2025 Lima-Ayacucho	4×100 m mixed medley
Silver medal – second place	2017 Santa Marta	4×100 m medley
Silver medal – second place	2025 Lima-Ayacucho	100 m butterfly
Silver medal – second place	2025 Lima-Ayacucho	200 m butterfly
Silver medal – second place	2025 Lima-Ayacucho	4×200 m freestyle
Bronze medal – third place	2017 Santa Marta	200 m butterfly

David Arias González (born 23 August 1995) is a Colombian swimmer. He competed in the men's 100 metre butterfly event at the 2017 World Aquatics Championships.
