= Open water swimming at the 2026 Central American and Caribbean Games =

- Venue: Sans Souci Beach
- Location: Santo Domingo, Dominican Republic
- Dates: 25–26 July

The open water swimming competition at the 2026 Central American and Caribbean Games was held in Santo Domingo, Dominican Republic, from 25 to 26 July 2026 at Sans Souci Beach.

== Participating nations ==
A total of 12 nations qualified athletes. The number of athletes a nation entered is in parentheses beside the name of the country.

- Aruba (2)
- Colombia (2)
- Costa Rica (1)
- Curaçao (2)
- Dominican Republic (4)
- El Salvador (4)
- Guatemala (4)
- Honduras (3)
- Mexico (4)
- Trinidad and Tobago (1)
- Venezuela (4)
- Virgin Islands (2)

== Medal table ==
* Host nation (Dominican Republic)

| Rank | Nation | Gold | Silver | Bronze | Total |
|---|---|---|---|---|---|
| 1 | Mexico (MEX) | 3 | 2 | 2 | 7 |
| 2 | Venezuela (VEN) | 1 | 1 | 2 | 4 |
| 3 | Costa Rica (CRC) | 0 | 1 | 0 | 1 |
| Totals (3 entries) | | 4 | 4 | 4 | 12 |

== Medal summary ==
| Event | Gold | | Silver | | Bronze | |
|---|---|---|---|---|---|---|
| Men's 3 km Knock-Out Sprint | Paulo Strehlke; Mexico | | Ronaldo Zambrano; Venezuela | | Diego Vera; Venezuela | |
| Men's 10 km | Paulo Strehlke; Mexico | 2:02:34.0 | Jeison Rojas; Costa Rica | 2:05:03.0 | Diego Obele; Mexico | 2:05:07.0 |
| Women's 3 km Knock-Out Sprint | Dalia Moreno; Mexico | | Yuritzi Salgado; Mexico | | Paola Pérez; Venezuela | |
| Women's 10 km | Paola Pérez; Venezuela | 2:18:25.0 | Yuritzi Salgado; Mexico | 2:18:44.0 | Dalia Moreno; Mexico | 2:18:48.0 |
