= Cecilia Dieleke =

Argentine swimmer (born 2009)

Personal information
- Full name: Cecilia Mabel Dieleke
- Nationality: Argentine
- Born: 8 October 2009 (age 17) San Martín, Buenos Aires, Argentina

Sport
- Sport: Swimming
- Strokes: Backstroke
Medal record
South American Games
Gold medal – first place	2026 Santa Fe	50 m backstroke
Gold medal – first place	2026 Santa Fe	100 m backstroke
Gold medal – first place	2026 Santa Fe	4 × 100 m medley relay
Silver medal – second place	2026 Santa Fe	200 m backstroke
Silver medal – second place	2026 Santa Fe	4 × 100 m freestyle relay
Silver medal – second place	2026 Santa Fe	Mixed 4 × 100 m medley relay
Bronze medal – third place	2026 Santa Fe	4 × 200 m freestyle relay
South American Championships
Bronze medal – third place	2024 Cali	4 × 200 m freestyle relay
Youth Olympic Games
Gold medal – first place	2026 Dakar	200 m backstroke
Bronze medal – third place	2026 Dakar	50 m backstroke
Bronze medal – third place	2026 Dakar	100 m backstroke
Junior Pan American Games
Silver medal – second place	2025 Asunción	100 m backstroke
Silver medal – second place	2025 Asunción	4 × 100 m medley relay
Silver medal – second place	2025 Asunción	4 × 200 m medley relay
Silver medal – second place	2025 Asunción	Mixed 4 × 100 m medley relay
Bronze medal – third place	2025 Asunción	200 m backstroke
Bronze medal – third place	2025 Asunción	4 × 100 m freestyle relay
Junior Pan Pacific Championships
Bronze medal – third place	2026 Vancouver	50 m backstroke
Bronze medal – third place	2026 Vancouver	200 m backstroke
South American Youth Games
Gold medal – first place	2026 Panama City	50 m backstroke
Gold medal – first place	2026 Panama City	100 m backstroke
Silver medal – second place	2026 Panama City	200 m backstroke
Silver medal – second place	2026 Panama City	4 × 100 m medley relay
Silver medal – second place	2026 Panama City	Mixed 4 × 100 m medley relay

Cecilia Mabel Dieleke (born 8 October 2009) is an Argentine swimmer who specializes in backstroke. She competed in the 2026 South American Games, where she won seven medals, and 2026 Summer Youth Olympics, where she won three medals, including the gold medal in the 200 metre backstroke.

== Early life and career ==
Born in San Martín, Buenos Aires, Dieleke began swimming at the age of six at the Sociedad Alemana de Gimnasia de Villa Ballester. She participated in municipal and metropolitan competitions before competing at her first national championship at age nine. When she was thirteen, Dieleke joined the Argentine national team. During her childhood, she also practiced artistic gymnastics, which she retired from to focus on swimming.

== Swimming career ==
Dieleke competed at the 2024 South American Swimming Championships in Cali, Colombia and won a bronze medal in the 4 × 200 m freestyle relay. At the 2025 Junior Pan American Games, in Asunción, Paraguay, she won six medals: four silver medals, in the 100 m backstroke, 4 × 100 m medley relay, 4 × 200 m medley relay, and mixed 4 × 100 m medley relay; and two bronze medals, in the 200 m backstroke and the 4 × 100 m freestyle relay.

In April 2026, Dieleke competed at the South American Youth Games in Panama City, Panama and won five medals, including the gold medal in the 50 m and 100 m backstroke, setting a South American record with a time of 28.67 and 1:00.42 in these respective events.

In August 2026, Dieleke competed at the Junior Pan Pacific Swimming Championships in Vancouver, Canada and won the bronze medal in the 50 m and 200 m backstroke.

In September 2026, at the South American Games in Santa Fe, Argentina, Dieleke won seven medals: gold medal in the 50 m and 100 m backstroke and the 4 × 100 m medley relay; silver medal in the 200 m backstroke, 4 × 100 m freestyle relay and mixed 4 × 100 m medley relay; and bronze medals in the 4 × 200 m freestyle relay. She was the Argentine athlete with the most medals at that Games. In the 50 m backstroke, she shared the gold medal with Etiene Medeiros, with a time of 28.38 seconds.

In November 2026, Dieleke competed at the Summer Youth Olympics in Dakar, Senegal and won a gold medal in the 200 m backstroke with a time of 2:10.05, setting a South American record in the process. She also won the bronze medal in the 100 m and 50 m backstroke.
