= Swimming at the 2010 South American Games – Women's 200 metre freestyle =

The Women's 200m freestyle event at the 2010 South American Games was held on March 28, with the heats at 10:54 and the Final at 18:15.

== Medalists ==
Gold	Silver	Bronze
Cecilia Biagioli; Argentina	Tatiana Barbosa; Brazil	Yanel Pinto; Venezuela

== Records ==
Standing records prior to the 2010 South American Games
World record	Federica Pellegrini (ITA)	1:52.98	Rome, Italy	29 July 2009
Competition Record	Cecilia Biagioli (ARG)	2:02.70	Buenos Aires, Argentina	17 November 2006
South American record	Monique Ferreira (BRA)	1:59.78	Rio de Janeiro, Brazil	6 May 2009

== Results ==
=== Heats ===
Rank	Heat	Lane	Athlete	Result	Notes
1	1	5	Nicole Maria Gilbert (ECU)	2:06.67	Q
2	1	4	Yanel Adriana Pinto (VEN)	2:06.77	Q
3	3	6	Valentina Hurtado (COL)	2:07.98	Q
4	3	4	Tatiana Barbosa (BRA)	2:08.10	Q
5	3	5	Sarah Correa (BRA)	2:08.50	Q
6	2	4	Cecilia Biagioli (ARG)	2:08.70	Q
7	2	5	Virginia Bardach (ARG)	2:09.74	Q
8	2	3	Maria Alejandra Perez (PER)	2:09.93	Q
9	3	3	Darneyis Orozco (VEN)	2:10.07	
10	1	6	Samantha Michelle Salinas (ECU)	2:10.85	
11	1	3	Daniela Kaori Coello (PER)	2:10.87	
12	2	2	Ines Remersaro (URU)	2:11.09	
13	1	2	Mariana Ramirez (CHI)	1:11.76	
14	2	6	Carmen Maury (COL)	2:12.20	
15	3	2	Chinyere Pigot (SUR)	2:14.36	
16	3	7	Daniella van den Berg (ARU)	2:14.50	
17	2	1	Maria Jose Quintanilla (BOL)	2:18.37	
18	2	7	Josefina Meneses (CHI)	2:21.11	
19	3	1	Chandel Domaso (SUR)	2:22.75	
20	1	7	Maria Nery Huerta (PAR)	2:23.55	

=== Final ===
Rank	Lane	Athlete	Result	Notes
1st place, gold medalist(s)	7	Cecilia Biagioli (ARG)	2:03.28	
2nd place, silver medalist(s)	6	Tatiana Barbosa (BRA)	2:05.00	
3rd place, bronze medalist(s)	5	Yanel Pinto (VEN)	2:05.07	
4	2	Sarah Correa (BRA)	2:05.99	
5	3	Valentina Hurtado (COL)	2:06.73	
6	4	Nicole Maria Gilbert (ECU)	2:06.86	
7	8	Maria Alejandra Perez (PER)	2:10.14	
8	1	Virginia Bardach (ARG)	2:10.16	
