= Andrea Becali =

Cuban swimmer (born 2004)

Personal information
- Nationality: Cuban
- Born: 24 April 2004 (age 22)
- Height: 172 cm (5 ft 8 in)

Sport
- Sport: Swimming
Medal record
Women's swimming
Representing Cuba
Central American and Caribbean Games
Bronze medal – third place	2018 Barranquilla	4x200 m freestyle
Bronze medal – third place	2023 San Salvador	100 m freestyle
Bronze medal – third place	2023 San Salvador	200 m freestyle
Gold medal – first place	2023 San Salvador	4x100 m freestyle
Gold medal – first place	2023 San Salvador	4x200 m freestyle

Andrea Becali (born 24 April 2004) is a Cuban swimmer. She competed in the women's 200 metre backstroke event at the 2018 FINA World Swimming Championships (25 m), in Hangzhou, China. In the same year, she won the bronze medal in the women's 4 x 200 metre freestyle relay event at the 2018 Central American and Caribbean Games held in Barranquilla, Colombia.
