= Javier Núñez (Dominican Republic swimmer) =

Dominican swimmer (born 2007)

Personal information
- Full name: Javier Yadier Núñez Barreras
- Nationality: Dominican
- Born: 4 April 2007 (age 19) Santo Domingo, Santo Domingo Province, Dominican Republic

Sport
- Sport: Swimming
- Club: Sin Fallos
- Coach: Eddy Rodríguez
Medal record
Representing Dominican Republic
Central American and Caribbean Games
Bronze medal – third place	2023 San Salvador	4×100 m medley relay

Javier Yadier Núñez Barreras (born 4 April 2007) is a Dominican swimmer who competed in the Men's 100 m freestyle at the 2024 Summer Olympics.

Núñez won the 2023 Central American and Caribbean Games 4 × 100 m medley relay bronze medal. He is coached by Eddy Rodríguez.
