= Swimming at the 2011 Pan American Games – Men's 4 × 100 metre medley relay =

Men's 4 × 100 metre medley relay at the 2011 Pan American Games
- Venue: Scotiabank Aquatics Center
- Dates: October 21 (preliminaries and finals)

Medalists
Gold medal	Guilherme Guido, Felipe França, Gabriel Mangabeira, César Cielo, Thiago Pereira, Felipe Lima, Kaio Almeida, Bruno Fratus	Brazil
Silver medal	Eugene Godsoe, Marcus Titus, Chris Brady, Scot Robison, David Russell, Kevin Swander, Robert Savulich	United States
Bronze medal	Federico Grabich, Lucas Peralta, Marcos Barale, Lucas Del Piccolo	Argentina

The men's 4 × 100 metre medley relay competition of the swimming events at the 2011 Pan American Games took place on 21 October at the Scotiabank Aquatics Center. The defending Pan American Games champion was the United States.

This race consisted of eight lengths of the pool. Each of the four swimmers completed two lengths of the pool. The first swimmer had to touch the wall before the second could leave the starting block.

== Records ==
Prior to this competition, the existing world and Pan American Games records were as follows:

World record	United States (USA); Aaron Peirsol (52.19); Eric Shanteau (58.57); Michael Phelps (49.72); David Walters (46.80)	3:27.28	Rome, Italy	August 2, 2009
Pan American Games record	United States (USA); Randall Bal (53.83); Mark Gangloff (59.54); Ricky Berens (52.25); Andy Grant (48.75)	3:34.37	Rio de Janeiro, Brazil	July 22, 2007

== Results ==
All times shown are in minutes.

KEY:	q	Fastest non-qualifiers	Q	Qualified	GR	Games record	NR	National record	PB	Personal best	SB	Seasonal best	PR	Pan American Games record

=== Heats ===
The first round was held on October 21.

Rank	Heat	Lane	Name	Nationality	Time	Notes
1	1	4	David Russell (55.02); Kevin Swander (1:00.04); Chris Brady (54.35); Robert Savulich (49.37)	United States	3:38.78	Q
2	2	4	Thiago Pereira (57.98); Felipe Lima (1:01.60); Kaio Almeida (55.46); Bruno Fratus (52.24)	Brazil	3:47.28	Q
3	1	6	Miguel Robles (58.79); David Oliver (1:03.52); Pablo Marmolejo (54.88); Alejandro Escudero (52.19)	Mexico	3:49.38	Q
4	2	2	Federico Grabich (57.86); Lucas Peralta (1:03.55); Marcos Barale (55.49); Lucas Del Piccolo (54.28)	Argentina	3:51.18	Q
5	1	5	Benjamin Hockin (57.28); Genaro Prono (1:04.20); Jose Lobo (56.94); Renato Prono (53.00)	Paraguay	3:51.42	Q
6	2	5	Luis Rojas (58.60); Carlos Claverie (1:05.29); Alexis Marquez (56.71); Crox Acuña (51.50)	Venezuela	3:52.10	Q
7	1	3	Ashton Baumann (1:00.81); Jacob Armstrong (1:04.58); Rory Biskupski (57.10); Lyam Dias (52.53)	Canada	3:55.02	Q
8	2	6	Alex Hernández (58.68); Christian Hernández (1:06.63); Lazaro Vergara (58.60); Pedro Medel (51.59)	Cuba	3:55.50	Q
9	2	3	Sebastian Jahnsen (1:00.88); Gerardo Huidobro (1:05.11); Mauricio Fiol (56.06); Jesus Monge (55.37)	Peru	3:57.42	
10	1	2	- - - -	Uruguay	DNS	

=== Final ===
The final was held on October 21.

Rank	Lane	Name	Nationality	Time	Notes
1st place, gold medalist(s)	5	Guilherme Guido (55.08); Felipe França (59.65); Gabriel Mangabeira (52.57); César Cielo (47.28)	Brazil	3:34.58	
2nd place, silver medalist(s)	4	Eugene Godsoe (54.80); Marcus Titus (1:01.16); Chris Brady (52.84); Scot Robison (48.37)	United States	3:37.17	
3rd place, bronze medalist(s)	6	Federico Grabich (55.73); Lucas Peralta (1:02.78); Marcos Barale (54.57); Lucas Del Piccolo (51.43)	Argentina	3:44.51	
4	3	Miguel Robles (58.22); David Oliver (1:02.50); Israel Duran (54.22); Alejandro Escudero (50.34)	Mexico	3:45.28	
5	2	Charles Hockin (58.03); Genaro Prono (1:02.75); Benjamin Hockin (52.80); Jose Lobo (52.20)	Paraguay	3:45.78	
6	8	Pedro Medel (56.49); Christian Hernández (1:06.10); Alex Hernández (54.80); Hanser García (49.09)	Cuba	3:46.48	
7	7	Luis Rojas (57.50); Carlos Claverie (1:04.95); Alexis Marquez (55.57); Cristian Quintero (49.86)	Venezuela	3:47.88	
8	1	Ashton Baumann (59.91); Warren Barnes (1:02.61); Rory Biskupski (56.48); Lyam Dias (52.61)	Canada	3:51.61	
