= Swimming at the 2011 Pan American Games – Men's 200 metre breaststroke =

Men's 200 metre breaststroke at the 2011 Pan American Games
- Venue: Scotiabank Aquatics Center
- Dates: October 18 (preliminaries and finals)
- Competitors: 17 from 13 nations

Medalists
Gold medal	Sean Mahoney	United States
Silver medal	Clark Burckle	United States
Bronze medal	Thiago Pereira	Brazil

The men's 200 metre breaststroke competition of the swimming events at the 2011 Pan American Games took place on October 18 at the Scotiabank Aquatics Center in the municipality of Zapopan, near Guadalajara, Mexico. The defending Pan American Games champion was Thiago Pereira of Brazil.

This race consisted of four lengths of the pool, all in breaststroke.

== Records ==
Prior to this competition, the existing world and Pan American Games records were as follows:

World record	Christian Sprenger (AUS)	2:07.31	Rome, Italy	July 30, 2009
Pan American Games record	Kyle Salyards (USA)	2:13.37	Santo Domingo, Dominican Republic	August 14, 2003

== Qualification ==
Each National Olympic Committee (NOC) was able to enter up to two entrants providing they had met the A standard (2:21.7) in the qualifying period (January 1, 2010 to September 4, 2011). NOCs were also permitted to enter one athlete providing they had met the B standard (2:26.0) in the same qualifying period.

== Results ==
All times are in minutes and seconds.

KEY:	q	Fastest non-qualifiers	Q	Qualified	GR	Games record	NR	National record	PB	Personal best	SB	Seasonal best

=== Heats ===
The first round was held on October 18.

Rank	Heat	Lane	Name	Nationality	Time	Notes
1	1	4	Sean Mahoney	United States	2:14.20	QA
2	3	5	Clark Burckle	United States	2:15.76	QA
3	1	5	Jorge Murillo	Colombia	2:16.06	QA
4	3	4	Thiago Pereira	Brazil	2:17.15	QA
5	2	5	Warren Barnes	Canada	2:17.36	QA
6	3	3	Ashton Baumann	Canada	2:18.59	QA
7	2	4	Tales Cerdeira	Brazil	2:20.30	QA
8	2	2	Eladio Carrión	Puerto Rico	2:20.78	QA
9	2	3	Édgar Crespo	Panama	2:20.92	QB
10	1	3	David Oliver	Mexico	2:23.08	QB
11	1	6	Lucas Peralta	Argentina	2:24.04	QB
12	3	6	Rodrigo Frutos	Argentina	2:24.51	QB
13	2	7	Jordy Groters	Aruba	2:26.69	QB
14	2	6	Juan Alberto Guerra	El Salvador	2:26.95	QB
15	1	2	Gerardo Huidobro	Peru	2:27.78	QB
16	3	7	Christian Hernandez	Cuba	2:28.25	QB
	3	2	Leopoldo Andara	Venezuela		DSQ

=== B Final ===
The B final was also held on October 18.

Rank	Lane	Name	Nationality	Time	Notes
9	4	Édgar Crespo	Panama	2:20.18	
10	5	David Oliver	Mexico	2:20.54	
11	1	Gerardo Huidobro	Peru	2:23.51	
12	3	Lucas Peralta	Argentina	2:26.13	
13	2	Jordy Groters	Aruba	2:27.10	
14	6	Rodrigo Frutos	Argentina	2:27.43	
15	8	Christian Hernandez	Cuba	2:27.76	
16	7	Juan Alberto Guerra	El Salvador	2:29.15	

=== A Final ===
The A final was also held on October 18.

Rank	Lane	Name	Nationality	Time	Notes
1st place, gold medalist(s)	4	Sean Mahoney	United States	2:11.62	GR
2nd place, silver medalist(s)	5	Clark Burckle	United States	2:12.60	
3rd place, bronze medalist(s)	6	Thiago Pereira	Brazil	2:13.58	
4	2	Warren Barnes	Canada	2:16.87	
5	1	Tales Cerdeira	Brazil	2:17.84	
6	3	Jorge Murillo	Colombia	2:18.13	
7	7	Ashton Baumann	Canada	2:19.54	
8	8	Eladio Carrión	Puerto Rico	2:20.31	
