= Swimming at the 2011 Pan American Games – Men's 100 metre breaststroke =

Men's 100 metre breaststroke at the 2011 Pan American Games
- Venue: Scotiabank Aquatics Center
- Dates: October 16 (preliminaries and finals)

Medalists
| Gold medal | Felipe França Silva | Brazil |
| Silver medal | Felipe Lima | Brazil |
| Bronze medal | Marcus Titus | United States |

The men's 100 metre breaststroke competition of the swimming events at the 2011 Pan American Games took place on October 16 at the Scotiabank Aquatics Center in Mexico. The defending Pan American Games champion was Scott Dickens of Canada.

This race consisted of two lengths of the pool, both being in breaststroke.

== Records ==
Prior to this competition, the existing world and Pan American Games records were as follows:

| World record | Brenton Rickard (AUS) | 58.58 | Rome, Italy | July 27, 2009 |
| Pan American Games record | Mark Gangloff (USA) | 1:00.24 | Rio de Janeiro, Brazil | July 17, 2007 |

== Qualification ==
Each National Olympic Committee (NOC) was able to enter up to two entrants providing they had met the A standard (1:04.7) in the qualifying period (January 1, 2010 to September 4, 2011). NOCs were also permitted to enter one athlete providing they had met the B standard (1:06.6) in the same qualifying period.

== Results ==
All times are in minutes and seconds.

| KEY: | q | Fastest non-qualifiers | Q | Qualified | NR | National record | PB | Personal best | SB | Seasonal best |

=== Heats ===
The first round was held on October 16.

| Rank | Heat | Lane | Name | Nationality | Time | Notes |
|---|---|---|---|---|---|---|
| 1 | 3 | 4 | Felipe França Silva | Brazil | 1:00.71 | QA |
| 2 | 3 | 5 | Marcus Titus | United States | 1:01.28 | QA |
| 3 | 2 | 4 | Kevin Swander | United States | 1:01.38 | QA |
| 4 | 1 | 4 | Felipe Lima | Brazil | 1:02.24 | QA |
| 5 | 2 | 5 | Édgar Crespo | Panama | 1:02.29 | QA |
| 6 | 2 | 6 | Martin Melconian | Uruguay | 1:03.05 | QA |
| 7 | 1 | 3 | David Oliver | Mexico | 1:03.23 | QA |
| 8 | 3 | 3 | Jorge Murillo | Colombia | 1:03.25 | QA |
| 9 | 1 | 5 | Warren Barnes | Canada | 1:03.31 | QB |
| 10 | 3 | 2 | Lucas Peralta | Argentina | 1:03.40 | QB |
| 11 | 2 | 3 | Genaro Prono | Paraguay | 1:03.79 | QB |
| 12 | 3 | 6 | Jacob Armstrong | Canada | 1:04.02 | QB |
| 13 | 1 | 6 | Rodrigo Frutos | Argentina | 1:04.34 | QB |
| 14 | 3 | 1 | Ezequiel Trujillo | Mexico | 1:04.67 | QB |
| 15 | 1 | 1 | Eladio Carrión | Puerto Rico | 1:05.36 | QB |
| 16 | 3 | 8 | Gerardo Huidobro | Peru | 1:05.62 | QB |
| 17 | 2 | 2 | Renato Prono | Paraguay | 1:05.72 | |
| 18 | 2 | 7 | Carlos Claverie | Venezuela | 1:05.80 | |
| 19 | 1 | 7 | Diego Santander | Chile | 1:05.84 | |
| 20 | 1 | 2 | Juan Alberto Guerra | El Salvador | 1:06.40 | |
| 21 | 2 | 1 | Diguan Pigot | Suriname | 1:06.54 | |
| 22 | 2 | 8 | Christian Hernandez | Cuba | 1:07.49 | |
| 23 | 3 | 7 | Rodion Davelaar | Netherlands Antilles | 1:08.07 | |

=== B Final ===
The B final was also held on October 16.

| Rank | Lane | Name | Nationality | Time | Notes |
|---|---|---|---|---|---|
| 9 | 4 | Warren Barnes | Canada | 1:03.50 | |
| 10 | 5 | Lucas Peralta | Argentina | 1:03.53 | |
| 11 | 3 | Genaro Prono | Paraguay | 1:04.22 | |
| 12 | 2 | Rodrigo Frutos | Argentina | 1:04.23 | |
| 13 | 6 | Jacob Armstrong | Canada | 1:04.29 | |
| 14 | 7 | Ezequiel Trujillo | Mexico | 1:04.50 | |
| 15 | 1 | Eladio Carrión | Puerto Rico | 1:05.22 | |
| 16 | 8 | Gerardo Huidobro | Peru | 1:05.68 | |

=== A Final ===
The A final was also held on October 16.

| Rank | Lane | Name | Nationality | Time | Notes |
|---|---|---|---|---|---|
| 1st place, gold medalist(s) | 4 | Felipe França Silva | Brazil | 1:00.34 | |
| 2nd place, silver medalist(s) | 6 | Felipe Lima | Brazil | 1:00.99 | |
| 3rd place, bronze medalist(s) | 5 | Marcus Titus | United States | 1:01.12 | |
| 4 | 3 | Kevin Swander | United States | 1:01.17 | |
| 5 | 2 | Édgar Crespo | Panama | 1:03.08 | |
| 6 | 7 | Martin Melconian | Uruguay | 1:03.10 | |
| 7 | 8 | Jorge Murillo | Colombia | 1:03.11 | |
| 8 | 1 | David Oliver | Mexico | 1:03.63 | |
