= 2012 FINA World Swimming Championships (25 m) – Men's 200 metre breaststroke =

Men's 200m Breaststroke at the 2012 Short Course Worlds
- Dates: 14 December (heats and final)
- Winning time: 2:01.35

Medalists
gold medal	Dániel Gyurta	Hungary
silver medal	Michael Jamieson	Great Britain
bronze medal	Viatcheslav Sinkevich	Russia

The men's 200 metre breaststroke event at the 11th FINA World Swimming Championships (25m) took place 14 December 2012 at the Sinan Erdem Dome.

== Records ==
Prior to this competition, the existing world and championship records were as follows.

	Name	Nation	Time	Location	Date
World record	Dániel Gyurta	Hungary	2:00.67	Istanbul	13 December 2009
Championship record	Naoya Tomita	Japan	2:03.12	Dubai	17 December 2010

The following records were established during the competition:

Date	Event	Name	Nation	Time	Record
14 December	Final	Dániel Gyurta	Hungary	2:01.35	CR

== Results ==
=== Heats ===
Rank	Heat	Lane	Name	Time	Notes
1	6	5	Akihiro Yamaguchi (JPN)	2:03.57	Q
2	6	4	Dániel Gyurta (HUN)	2:03.64	Q
3	6	2	Clark Burckle (USA)	2:03.87	Q
4	4	3	Andrew Willis (GBR)	2:03.94	Q
5	4	5	Marco Koch (GER)	2:03.95	Q, NR
6	4	4	Viatcheslav Sinkevich (RUS)	2:04.07	Q
7	5	3	Yukihiro Takahashi (JPN)	2:04.93	Q
8	5	4	Michael Jamieson (GBR)	2:06.05	Q
9	5	5	Ihor Borysyk (UKR)	2:06.37	
10	4	6	Scott Weltz (USA)	2:07.45	
11	5	2	Chris Christensen (DEN)	2:07.71	
12	5	6	Tomáš Klobučník (SVK)	2:07.96	NR
13	6	8	Laurent Carnol (LUX)	2:08.15	
14	2	9	Valeriy Dymo (UKR)	2:08.37	
15	2	0	Dmitriy Balandin (KAZ)	2:09.07	
16	6	3	Anton Lobanov (RUS)	2:09.80	
17	4	2	Giedrius Titenis (LTU)	2:09.95	
18	5	7	Andrew Poznikoff (CAN)	2:10.06	
19	4	7	Jorge Murillo (COL)	2:10.07	NR
20	6	8	Eladio Carrión (PUR)	2:10.10	NR
21	5	1	Warren Barnes (CAN)	2:10.63	
22	1	1	Roman Trussov (KAZ)	2:10.86	
22	3	3	Michael Meyer (RSA)	2:10.86	
24	6	7	Malick Fall (SEN)	2:12.15	
25	4	1	Choi Kyu-Woong (KOR)	2:12.50	
26	5	8	Dmitrii Aleksandrov (KGZ)	2:12.60	
27	6	1	Christian Schurr Voight (MEX)	2:13.39	
28	1	6	Huang Yunkun (CHN)	2:14.32	
29	6	0	Vaidotas Blažys (LTU)	2:14.76	
30	1	3	Joshua Hall (PHI)	2:15.07	
31	6	9	Damir Davletbaev (KGZ)	2:16.11	
32	4	0	Pedro Pinotes (ANG)	2:16.77	
33	3	5	Jordy Groters (ARU)	2:16.78	
34	4	8	Lionel Khoo (SIN)	2:16.86	
35	1	5	Ensar Hajder (BIH)	2:17.15	NR
36	5	9	Chao Man Hou (MAC)	2:17.25	
37	2	8	Abdulrahman Albader (KUW)	2:17.75	
38	3	4	Enrique Duran Garcia-Bedoya (PER)	2:17.85	
39	4	9	Damjan Petrovski (MKD)	2:18.08	NR
40	3	7	Andrea Agius (MLT)	2:21.93	
41	3	0	Josue Dominguez Ramos (DOM)	2:23.57	
42	3	6	Shafee Mohamed (UAE)	2:24.19	
43	3	9	Arvind Mani (IND)	2:26.89	
44	2	4	Darren Chan Chin Wah (MRI)	2:28.15	
45	3	8	Andrea M. Agius (MLT)	2:28.34	
46	2	5	Walid Daloul (QAT)	2:35.40	
47	2	6	Hassan Ashraf (MDV)	2:40.57	
48	2	2	Brandon Schuster (SAM)	2:41.47	
49	2	3	Naser Hassan (QAT)	2:50.56	
50	2	1	Nikolas Sylvester (VIN)	3:05.74	
51	2	7	Storm Halbich (VIN)	3:08.37	
	1	2	Liu Weijia (CHN)	DSQ	
	1	7	Andrew Rutherfurd (BOL)	DSQ	
	3	2	Agnishwar Jayaprakash (IND)	DSQ	
	5	0	Abraham McLeod (TRI)	DSQ	
	1	4	Miguel Ferreira (VEN)	DNS	
	3	1	Mbeh Tanji (CMR)	DNS	

=== Final ===
The final was held at 19:36.

Rank	Lane	Name	Nationality	Time	Notes
1st place, gold medalist(s)	5	Dániel Gyurta	Hungary	2:01.35	CR
2nd place, silver medalist(s)	8	Michael Jamieson	Great Britain	2:03.00	NR
3rd place, bronze medalist(s)	7	Viatcheslav Sinkevich	Russia	2:03.08	
4	4	Akihiro Yamaguchi	Japan	2:03.23	
5	6	Andrew Willis	Great Britain	2:03.29	
6	3	Clark Burckle	United States	2:03.58	
7	2	Marco Koch	Germany	2:03.68	NR
8	1	Yukihiro Takahashi	Japan	2:04.92	
