= Swimming at the 2014 South American Games – Men's 200 metre breaststroke =

Men's 200 metre breaststroke at the 2014 South American Games
- Venue: Estadio Nacional
- Dates: March 10, 2014 (heats & finals)
- Competitors: 11 from 7 nations
- Winning time: 2:15.42

Medalists
| gold medal | Henrique Barbosa | Brazil |
| silver medal | Tales Cerdeira | Brazil |
| bronze medal | Carlos Claverie | Venezuela |

The men's 200 metre breaststroke competition at the 2014 South American Games took place on March 10 at the Estadio Nacional. The last champion was Thiago Pereira of Brazil.

This race consisted of four lengths of the pool, all in breaststroke.

== Records ==
Prior to this competition, the existing world and Pan Pacific records were as follows:

| World record | Akihiro Yamaguchi (JPN) | 2:07.01 | Gifu, Japan | September 15, 2012 |
| South American Games record | Thiago Pereira (BRA) | 2:16.89 | Medellín, Colombia | March 29, 2010 |

== Results ==
All times are in minutes and seconds.

| KEY: | q | Fastest non-qualifiers | Q | Qualified | CR | Championships record | NR | National record | PB | Personal best | SB | Seasonal best |

=== Heats ===
The first round was held on March 10, at 11:44.

| Rank | Heat | Lane | Name | Nationality | Time | Notes |
|---|---|---|---|---|---|---|
| 1 | 1 | 4 | Henrique Barbosa | Brazil | 2:17.91 | Q |
| 2 | 2 | 3 | Carlos Mahecha | Colombia | 2:18.83 | Q |
| 3 | 2 | 5 | Carlos Claverie | Venezuela | 2:19.57 | Q |
| 4 | 2 | 4 | Tales Cerdeira | Brazil | 2:20.92 | Q |
| 5 | 1 | 5 | Facundo Miguelena | Argentina | 2:23.24 | Q |
| 6 | 2 | 6 | Enrique Duran Garcia Bedoya | Peru | 2:23.33 | Q |
| 7 | 1 | 3 | Gabriel Morelli | Argentina | 2:24.81 | Q |
| 8 | 1 | 2 | Santiago Won Siu | Peru | 2:25.37 | Q |
| 9 | 2 | 2 | José Galvez Engels | Chile | 2:26.13 | |
| 10 | 1 | 6 | Jose Mora Jacome | Ecuador | 2:29.12 | |
| 11 | 2 | 7 | Andrés Bastías Leiva | Chile | 2:34.67 | |

=== Final ===
The final was held on March 10, at 20:11.

| Rank | Lane | Name | Nationality | Time | Notes |
|---|---|---|---|---|---|
| 1st place, gold medalist(s) | 4 | Henrique Barbosa | Brazil | 2:15.42 | CR |
| 2nd place, silver medalist(s) | 6 | Tales Cerdeira | Brazil | 2:16.58 | |
| 3rd place, bronze medalist(s) | 3 | Carlos Claverie | Venezuela | 2:17.02 | |
| 4 | 5 | Carlos Mahecha | Colombia | 2:18.10 | |
| 5 | 2 | Facundo Miguelena | Argentina | 2:19.49 | |
| 6 | 7 | Enrique Duran Garcia Bedoya | Peru | 2:22.48 | |
| 7 | 1 | Gabriel Morelli | Argentina | 2:24.09 | |
| 8 | 8 | Santiago Won Siu | Peru | 2:27.63 | |
