= Swimming at the 2014 South American Games – Men's 100 metre breaststroke =

Men's 100 metre breaststroke at the 2014 South American Games
- Venue: Estadio Nacional
- Dates: March 7, 2014 (heats & finals)
- Competitors: 17 from 11 nations
- Winning time: 1:01.63

Medalists
gold medal	Felipe Lima	Brazil
silver medal	Carlos Claverie	Venezuela
bronze medal	Édgar Crespo	Panama

The men's 100 metre breaststroke competition at the 2014 South American Games took place on March 7 at the Estadio Nacional. The last champion was Felipe França Silva of Brazil.

This race consisted of two lengths of the pool, both lengths being in breaststroke.

== Records ==
Prior to this competition, the existing world and Pan Pacific records were as follows:

World record	Cameron van der Burgh (RSA)	58.46	London, Great Britain	July 19, 2012
South American Games record	Felipe França Silva (BRA)	1:02.87	Medellín, Colombia	March 26, 2010

== Results ==
All times are in minutes and seconds.

KEY:	q	Fastest non-qualifiers	Q	Qualified	CR	Championships record	NR	National record	PB	Personal best	SB	Seasonal best

=== Heats ===
The first round was held on March 7, at 12:12.

Rank	Heat	Lane	Name	Nationality	Time	Notes
1	3	4	Felipe Lima	Brazil	1:02.13	Q, CR
2	3	5	Carlos Claverie	Venezuela	1:02.85	Q
3	2	4	Édgar Crespo	Panama	1:03.77	Q
4	1	4	Henrique Barbosa	Brazil	1:03.79	Q
5	1	5	Miguel Eduardo Ferreira	Venezuela	1:03.81	Q
6	2	3	Martin Melconian Alvez	Uruguay	1:03.87	Q
7	1	3	Carlos Mahecha	Colombia	1:04.09	Q
8	2	5	Gabriel Morelli	Argentina	1:04.21	Q
9	3	3	Facundo Miguelena	Argentina	1:04.51	
10	2	6	Enrique Duran Garcia Bedoya	Peru	1:05.44	
11	1	6	Santiago Won Siu	Peru	1:06.06	
12	1	2	Wayne Denswil	Suriname	1:06.90	
13	3	6	Alex Solorzano Castro	Ecuador	1:07.75	
14	2	2	José Galvez Engels	Chile	1:08.33	
15	3	7	Felipe Quiroz Uteau	Chile	1:09.12	
16	3	2	Jose Mora Jacome	Ecuador	1:09.81	
17	2	7	Matias Gadea Basualdo	Paraguay	1:12.41	

=== Final ===
The final was held on March 7, at 20:06.

Rank	Lane	Name	Nationality	Time	Notes
1st place, gold medalist(s)	4	Felipe Lima	Brazil	1:01.63	CR
2nd place, silver medalist(s)	5	Carlos Claverie	Venezuela	1:02.19	
3rd place, bronze medalist(s)	3	Édgar Crespo	Panama	1:02.58	
4	6	Henrique Barbosa	Brazil	1:02.94	
5	1	Carlos Mahecha	Colombia	1:03.52	
6	8	Gabriel Morelli	Argentina	1:03.65	
7	7	Martin Melconian Alvez	Uruguay	1:03.68	
8	2	Miguel Eduardo Ferreira	Venezuela	1:03.75	
