= Swimming at the 2019 Pan American Games – Men's 100 metre breaststroke =

Men's 100 metre breaststroke at the 2019 Pan American Games
- Venue: Villa Deportiva Nacional, VIDENA
- Dates: August 6 (preliminaries and finals)
- Competitors: 27 from 21 nations

Medalists
Gold medal	João Gomes Júnior	Brazil
Silver medal	Cody Miller	United States
Bronze medal	Kevin Cordes	United States

The men's 100 metre breaststroke competition of the swimming events at the 2019 Pan American Games were held August 6th, 2019 at the Villa Deportiva Nacional Videna cluster.

== Records ==
Prior to this competition, the existing world and Pan American Games records were as follows:

World record	Adam Peaty (GBR)	56.88	Gwangju, South Korea	July 21, 2019
Pan American Games record	Felipe França Silva (BRA)	59.21	Toronto, Canada	July 17, 2015

== Results ==
KEY:	q	Fastest non-qualifiers	Q	Qualified	GR	Games record	NR	National record	PB	Personal best	SB	Seasonal best

=== Heats ===
The first round was held on August 6.

Rank	Heat	Lane	Name	Nationality	Time	Notes
1	3	4	João Gomes Júnior	Brazil	59.57	QA
2	4	4	Felipe Lima	Brazil	59.91	QA
3	4	5	Cody Miller	United States	1:00.28	QA
4	2	4	Kevin Cordes	United States	1:00.58	QA
5	3	5	Jorge Murillo	Colombia	1:01.03	QA
6	2	5	Miguel de Lara	Mexico	1:01.04	QA
7	4	3	Mauro Castillo Luna	Mexico	1:01.77	QA
8	4	7	Martin Melconian	Uruguay	1:01.89	QA,NR
9	4	2	Gabriel Morelli	Argentina	1:02.07	QB
10	3	2	James Dergousoff	Canada	1:02.17	QB
11	2	3	Carlos Mahecha	Colombia	1:02.32	QB
12	4	6	Marco Guarente	Venezuela	1:02.38	QB
13	3	3	Carlos Claverie	Venezuela	1:02.67	QB
14	2	2	Josué Domínguez	Dominican Republic	1:02.74	QB
15	3	7	Julio Horrego	Honduras	1:02.94	QB, NR
16	3	6	Édgar Crespo	Panama	1:02.95	QB
17	2	7	Adriel Sanes	Virgin Islands	1:03.03	
18	2	6	Renato Prono	Paraguay	1:03.08	
19	3	1	Johan Carrillo	Cuba	1:04.10	
20	4	1	Santiago Cavanagh	Bolivia	1:04.71	
21	3	8	Luis Weekes	Barbados	1:05.65	
22	4	8	Giordano Gonzales	Peru	1:06.19	
23	1	3	José Gálvez Engels	Chile	1:06.47	
24	2	1	Arnoldo Herrera	Costa Rica	1:07.11	
25	1	4	Alexandre Grand'Pierre	Haiti	1:07.32	
26	2	8	William Tyler Russell	Bahamas	1:07.67	
27	1	5	Miguel Castillo Romero	Peru	1:07.68	

=== Final B ===
The B final was also held on August 6.

Rank	Lane	Name	Nationality	Time	Notes
9	6	Marco Guarente	Venezuela	1:01.59	
10	5	James Dergousoff	Canada	1:02.00	
11	8	Édgar Crespo	Panama	1:02.31	
12	1	Julio Horrego	Honduras	1:02.37	NR
13	4	Gabriel Morelli	Argentina	1:02.52	
14	3	Carlos Mahecha	Colombia	1:02.68	
15	2	Carlos Claverie	Venezuela	1:02.98	
16	7	Josué Domínguez	Dominican Republic	1:03.03	

=== Final A ===
The A final was also held on August 6.

Rank	Lane	Name	Nationality	Time	Notes
1st place, gold medalist(s)	4	João Gomes Júnior	Brazil	59.51	
2nd place, silver medalist(s)	3	Cody Miller	United States	59.57	
3rd place, bronze medalist(s)	6	Kevin Cordes	United States	1:00.27	
4	5	Felipe Lima	Brazil	1:00.36	
5	2	Jorge Murillo	Colombia	1:00.91	
6	7	Miguel de Lara	Mexico	1:01.12	
7	1	Mauro Castillo Luna	Mexico	1:01.15	
8	8	Martin Melconian	Uruguay	1:02.09	
