= Swimming at the 2019 Pan American Games – Men's 200 metre breaststroke =

Men's 200 metre breaststroke at the 2019 Pan American Games
- Venue: Villa Deportiva Nacional, VIDENA
- Dates: August 8 (preliminaries and finals)
- Competitors: 24 from 19 nations
- Winning time: 2:07.62

Medalists
Gold medal	Will Licon	United States
Silver medal	Nic Fink	United States
Bronze medal	Miguel de Lara	Mexico

The men's 200 metre breaststroke competition of the swimming events at the 2019 Pan American Games was held on August 8, 2019, at the Villa Deportiva Nacional Videna cluster.

== Records ==
Prior to this competition, the existing world and Pan American Games records were as follows:

World record	Anton Chupkov (RUS)	2:06.12	Gwangju, South Korea	July 26, 2019
Pan American Games record	Thiago Simon (BRA)	2:09.82	Toronto, Canada	July 15, 2015

== Results ==
KEY:	q	Fastest non-qualifiers	Q	Qualified	GR	Games record	NR	National record	PB	Personal best	SB	Seasonal best

=== Heats ===
The first round will be held on August 8.

Rank	Heat	Lane	Name	Nationality	Time	Notes
1	2	4	Nicolas Fink	United States	2:10.02	QA
2	3	4	Will Licon	United States	2:10.62	QA
3	1	4	Miguel de Lara	Mexico	2:11.82	QA
4	2	5	Mauro Castillo Luna	Mexico	2:13.07	QA
5	3	3	Carlos Claverie	Venezuela	2:13.57	QA
6	1	3	Gabriel Morelli	Argentina	2:13.64	QA, NR
6	2	3	Marco Guarente	Venezuela	2:13.64	QA
8	1	5	James Dergousoff	Canada	2:13.73	QA
9	2	6	Jorge Murillo	Colombia	2:14.09	QB
10	3	6	Carlos Mahecha	Colombia	2:14.30	QB
11	3	5	Caio Pumputis	Brazil	2:14.77	WD
12	1	2	Adriel Sanes	Virgin Islands	2:17.56	QB
13	1	6	Julio Horrego	Honduras	2:18.21	QB
14	2	7	Martin Melconian	Uruguay	2:21.72	WD
15	1	7	José Galvez Engels	Chile	2:23.50	QB
16	2	2	Édgar Crespo	Panama	2:24.12	QB
17	2	1	Giordano Gonzales	Peru	2:24.49	QB
18	3	7	Arnoldo Herrera	Costa Rica	2:24.96	QB
19	3	8	Víctor Fernández Cruz	Cuba	2:25.17	
20	3	1	Luis Weekes	Barbados	2:25.95	
21	2	8	Alexandre Grand'Pierre	Haiti	2:27.06	
22	1	1	William Tyler Russell	Bahamas	2:29.37	
23	1	8	Patricio Figueroa Raygada	Peru	2:29.62	
24	3	2	Josué Domínguez	Dominican Republic	2:33.41	

=== Final B ===
The B final was also held on August 8.

Rank	Lane	Name	Nationality	Time	Notes
9	4	Jorge Murillo	Colombia	2:13.59	
10	5	Carlos Mahecha	Colombia	2:15.68	
11	3	Adriel Sanes	Virgin Islands	2:16.40	
12	6	Julio Horrego	Honduras	2:17.90	
13	7	Édgar Crespo	Panama	2:21.60	
14	2	José Galvez Engels	Chile	2:23.97	
15	1	Giordano Gonzales	Peru	2:24.11	
	8	Arnoldo Herrera	Costa Rica	DNS	

=== Final A ===
The A final was also held on August 8.

Rank	Lane	Name	Nationality	Time	Notes
1st place, gold medalist(s)	5	Will Licon	United States	2:07.62	GR
2nd place, silver medalist(s)	4	Nicolas Fink	United States	2:08.16	
3rd place, bronze medalist(s)	3	Miguel de Lara	Mexico	2:11.23	NR
4	6	Mauro Castillo Luna	Mexico	2:12.21	
5	7	Gabriel Morelli	Argentina	2:12.83	NR
6	2	Carlos Claverie	Venezuela	2:13.19	
7	1	Marco Guarente	Venezuela	2:14.40	
8	8	James Dergousoff	Canada	2:15.00	
