= Vyacheslav Sinkevich =

Russian swimmer (born 1991)

Personal information
- Born: November 29, 1991 (age 34) Krasnoobsk, Novosibirsk, Russia
Medal record
Men's swimming
Representing Russia
World Championships (SC)
| Silver medal – second place | 2012 Istanbul | 4×100 m medley |
| Bronze medal – third place | 2012 Istanbul | 200 m breaststroke |
European Championships (SC)
| Gold medal – first place | 2012 Chartres | 200 m breaststroke |
| Gold medal – first place | 2013 Herning | 4 x 50 m medley relay |
| Silver medal – second place | 2011 Szczecin | 200 m breaststroke |
Summer Universiade
| Gold medal – first place | 2013 Kazan | 200 m breaststroke |
| Gold medal – first place | 2013 Kazan | 4×100 m medley |

Viatcheslav Sinkevich (born November 29, 1991, in Krasnoobsk) is a Russian swimmer. At the 2012 Summer Olympics, he competed in the Men's 200 metre breaststroke, finishing in 9th place overall in the heats, qualifying for the semi-final, but failing to reach the final. He was also part of Russia's 4 x 100 m medley relay team at that Olympics; that team also failed to reach the final.

Later in 2012, Sinkevich won two medals at the World Short Course Championships, a silver in the men's 4 x 100 m medley relay (with Stanislav Donets, Nikolay Skvortsov and Vladimir Morozov) and a bronze medal in the men's 200 m breaststroke.

He has also won multiple medals at the European Short Course Championships, with gold in the 200 m breaststroke in 2012 and the men's 4 x 50 m medley relay in 2013, after a silver in the men's 200 m breaststroke in 2011.
