= Tsilavina Ramanantsoa =

Malagasy swimmer

Personal information
- Born: April 24, 1992 (age 34)

Sport
- Sport: Swimming
- Strokes: Breaststroke

Tsilavina Ramanantsoa (born April 24, 1992) is a Malagasy swimmer. At the 2012 Summer Olympics, he competed in the Men's 200 metre breaststroke
