= Sergiev-Kazan Church, Krasnoobsk =

Russian Orthodox church in Krasnoobsk, Russia

Sergiev-Kazan Church Сергиево-Казанский храм
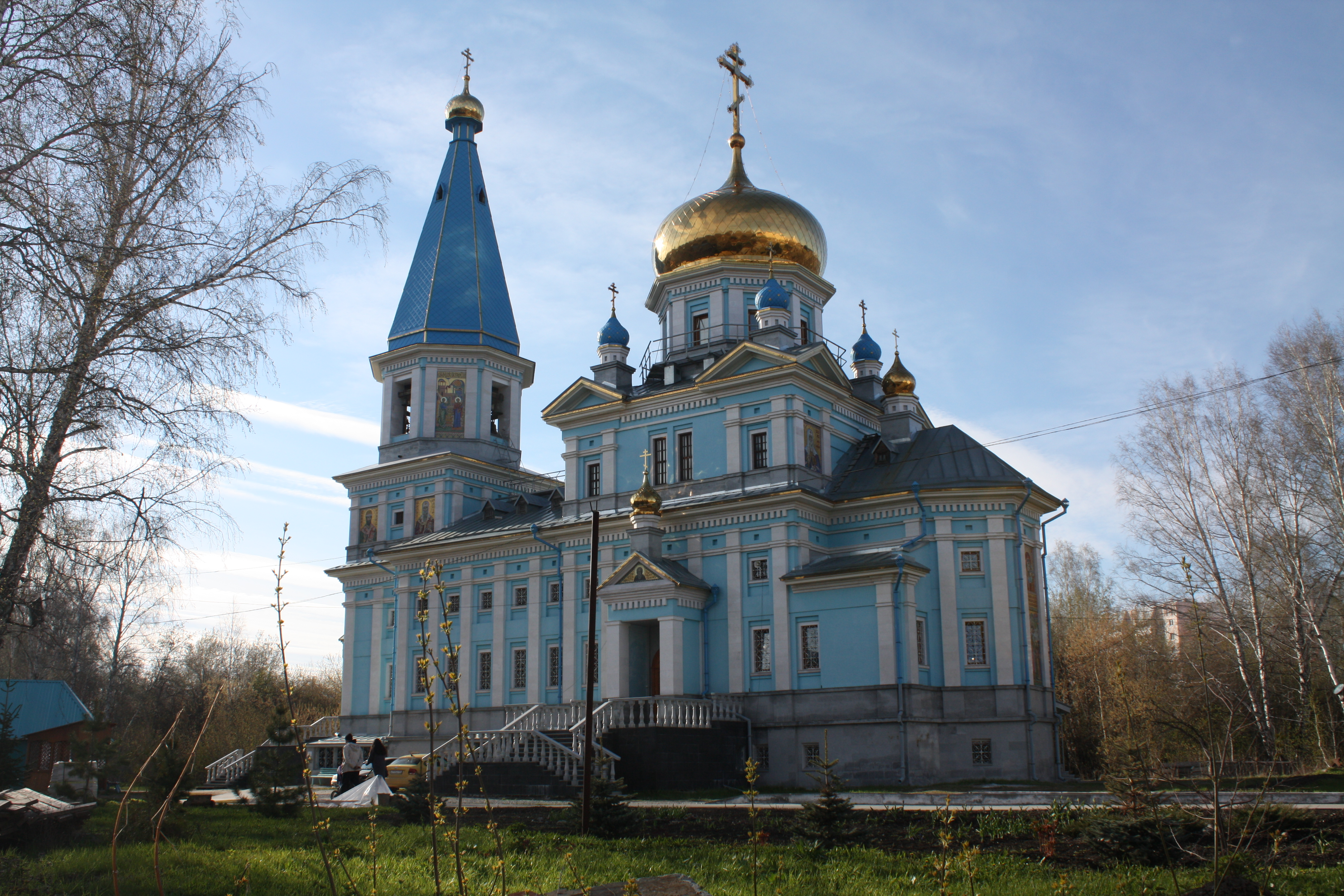

Religion
- Affiliation: Russian Orthodox
- Year consecrated: 2012

Location
- Location: Krasnoobsk
- Interactive map of Sergiev-Kazan Church; Сергиево-Казанский храм
- Coordinates: 54°55′10″N 82°58′38″E

Sergiev-Kazan Church (Russian: Сергиево-Казанский храм) is a Russian Orthodox church in Krasnoobsk of Novosibirsk Oblast, Russia.

== History ==
The church was constructed from 1996 to 2012. It was consecrated in 2012.

== Gallery ==
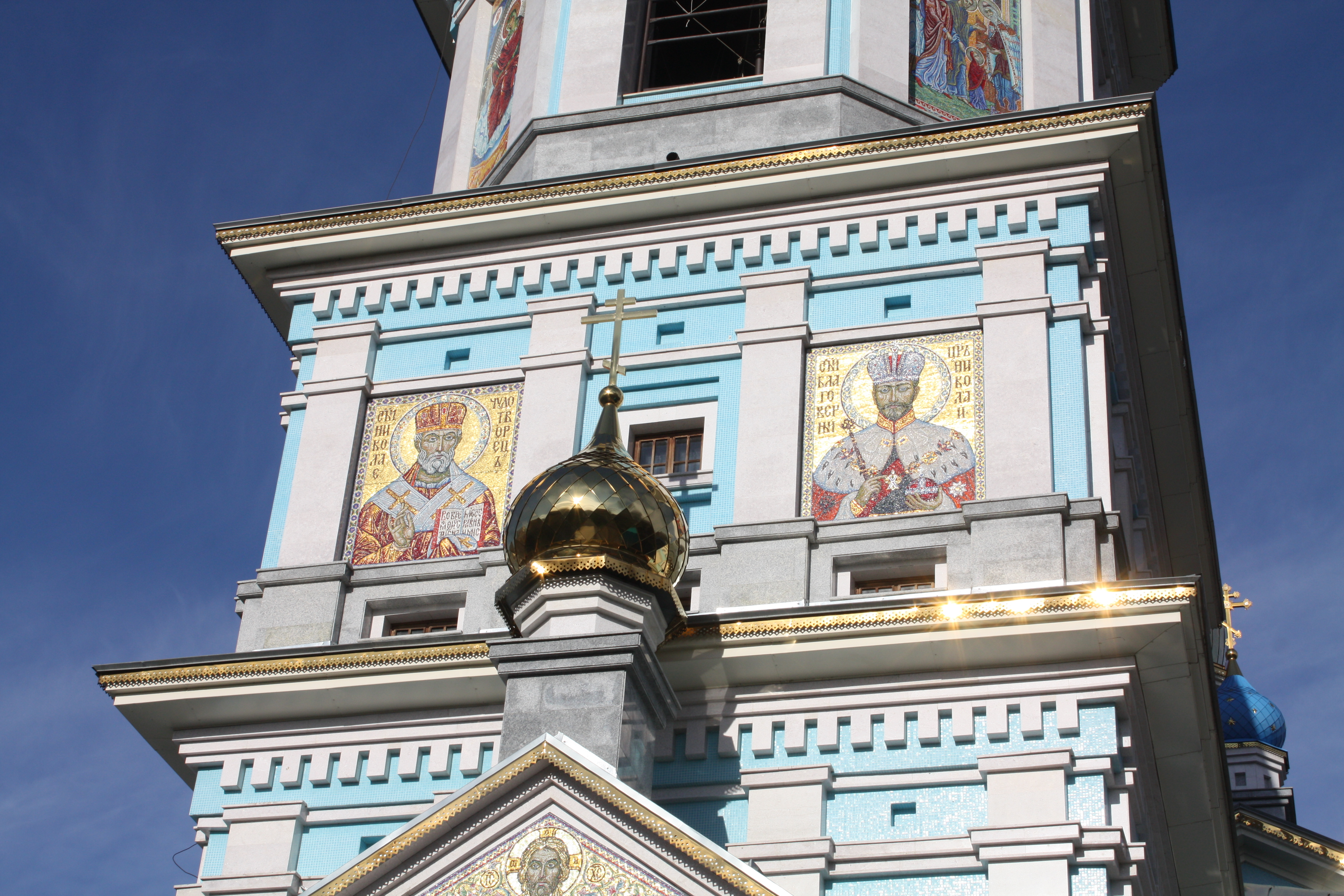

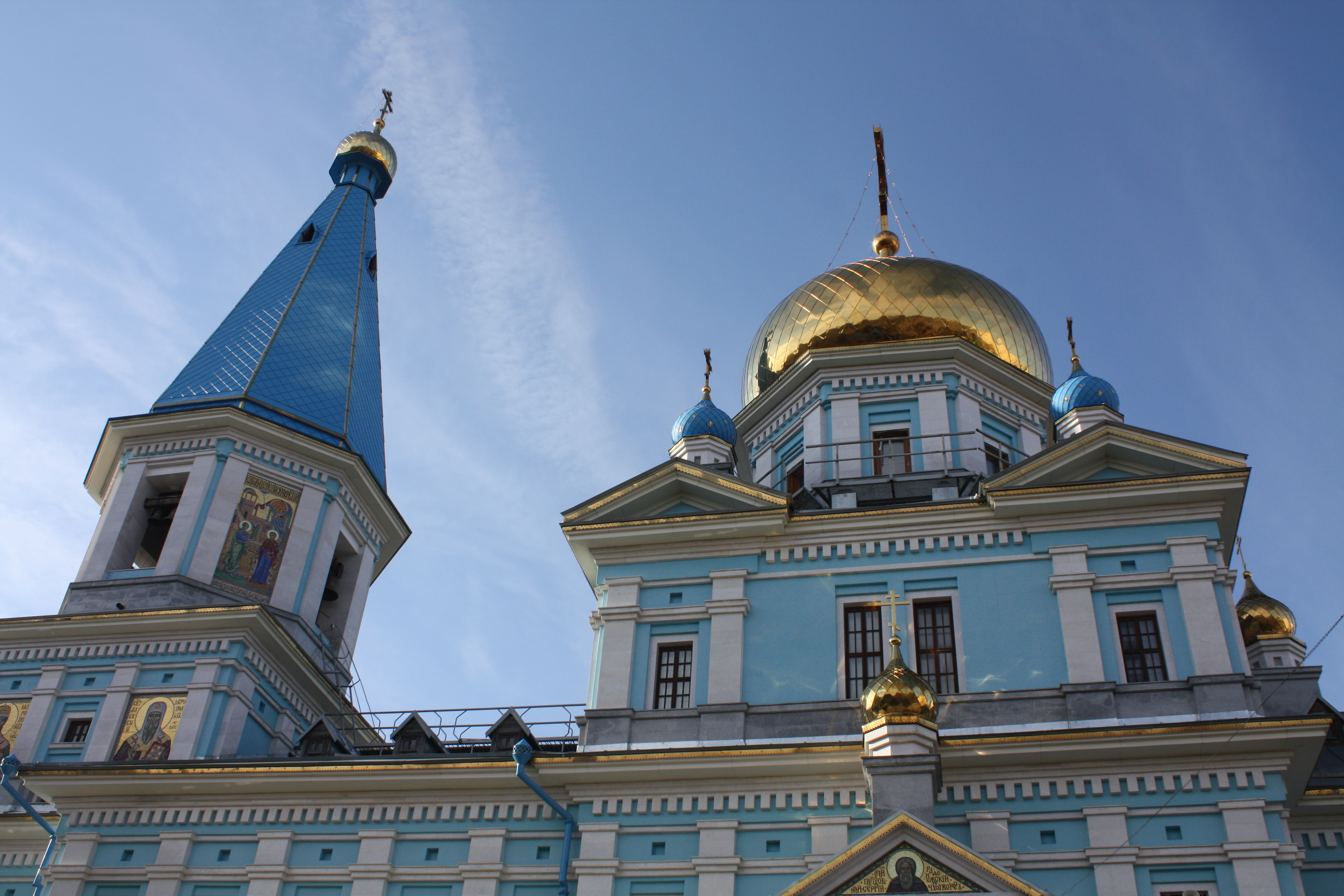

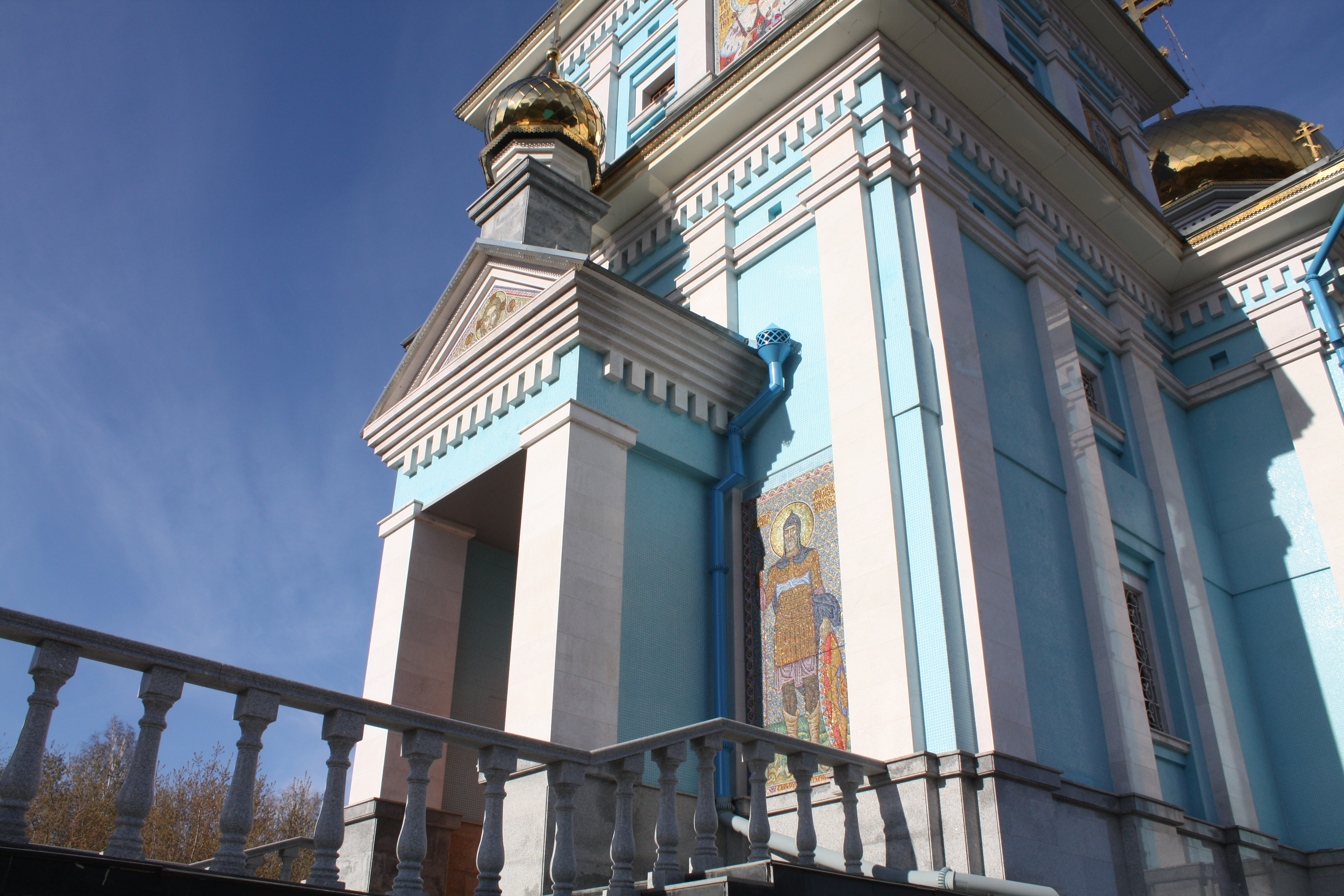
