= Siberian Scientific Agricultural Library =

Library in Krasnoobsk, Russia

State Public Scientific & Technological Library
- Сибирская научная сельскохозяйственная библиотека
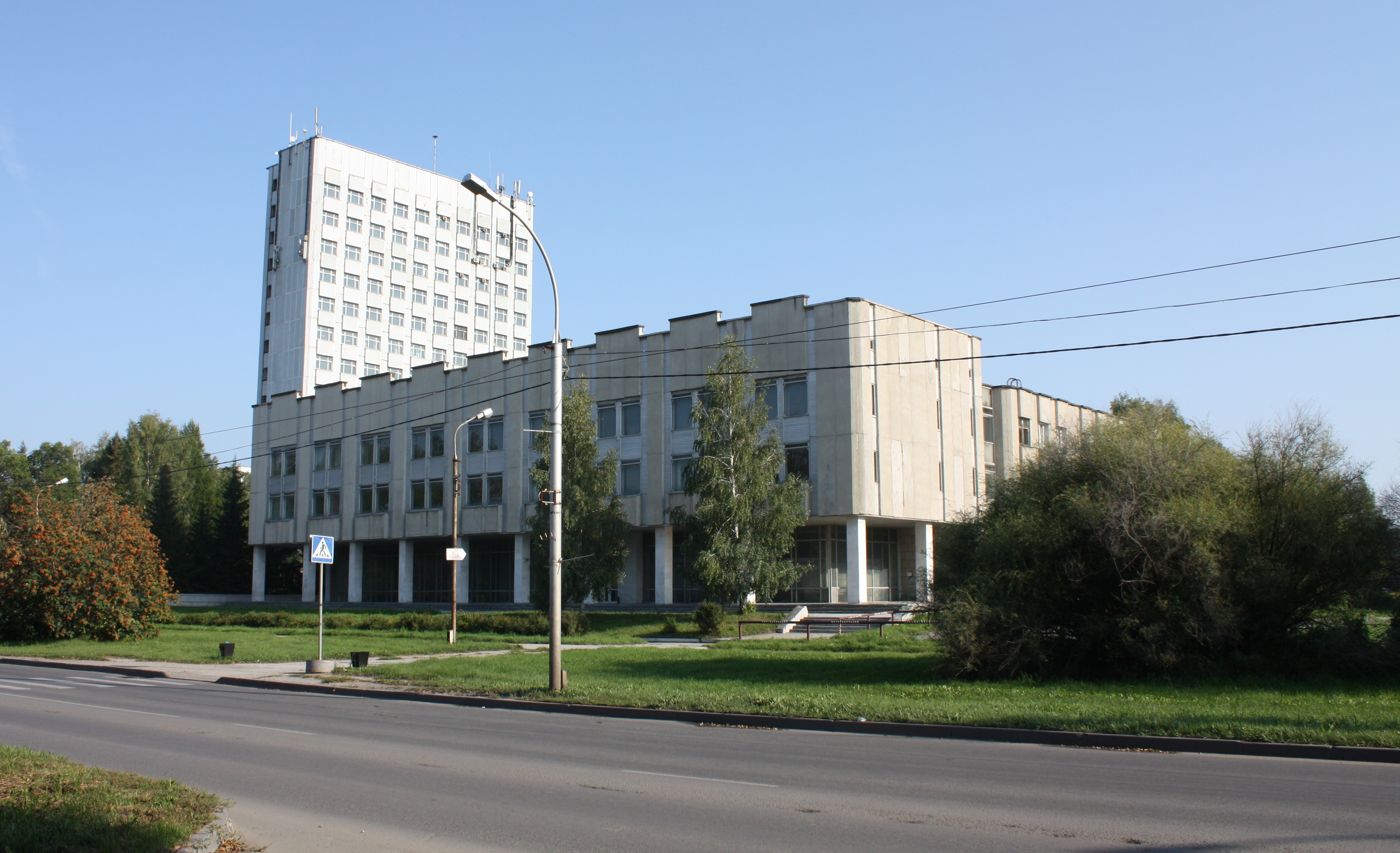
- 54.9170°N 82.9833°E
- Location: Krasnoobsk, Russia
- Established: 1971 (55 years ago)

Collection
- Size: 650,000

Siberian Scientific Agricultural Library is a library in Krasnoobsk, Russia. It was founded in 1971.

== History ==
The library was organized in 1971. In 1988, it moved to a new building.

== Library holdings ==
The library holds more than 650,000 documents (periodicals, books, unpublished technical literature, etc.) on forestry, agriculture and fisheries, hunting, agricultural construction, environmental protection. The library has agricultural journals issued since 1890.

== See also ==
- List of libraries in Russia

== Bibliography ==
- Ламин В. А. (2003). Энциклопедия. Новосибирск. Новосибирск: Новосибирское книжное издательство. pp. 92–93. ISBN 5-7620-0968-8.
