= Siberian Research Technological Design Institute of Processing of Agricultural Products =

Research institute in Krasnoobsk, Novosibirsk Oblast, Russia

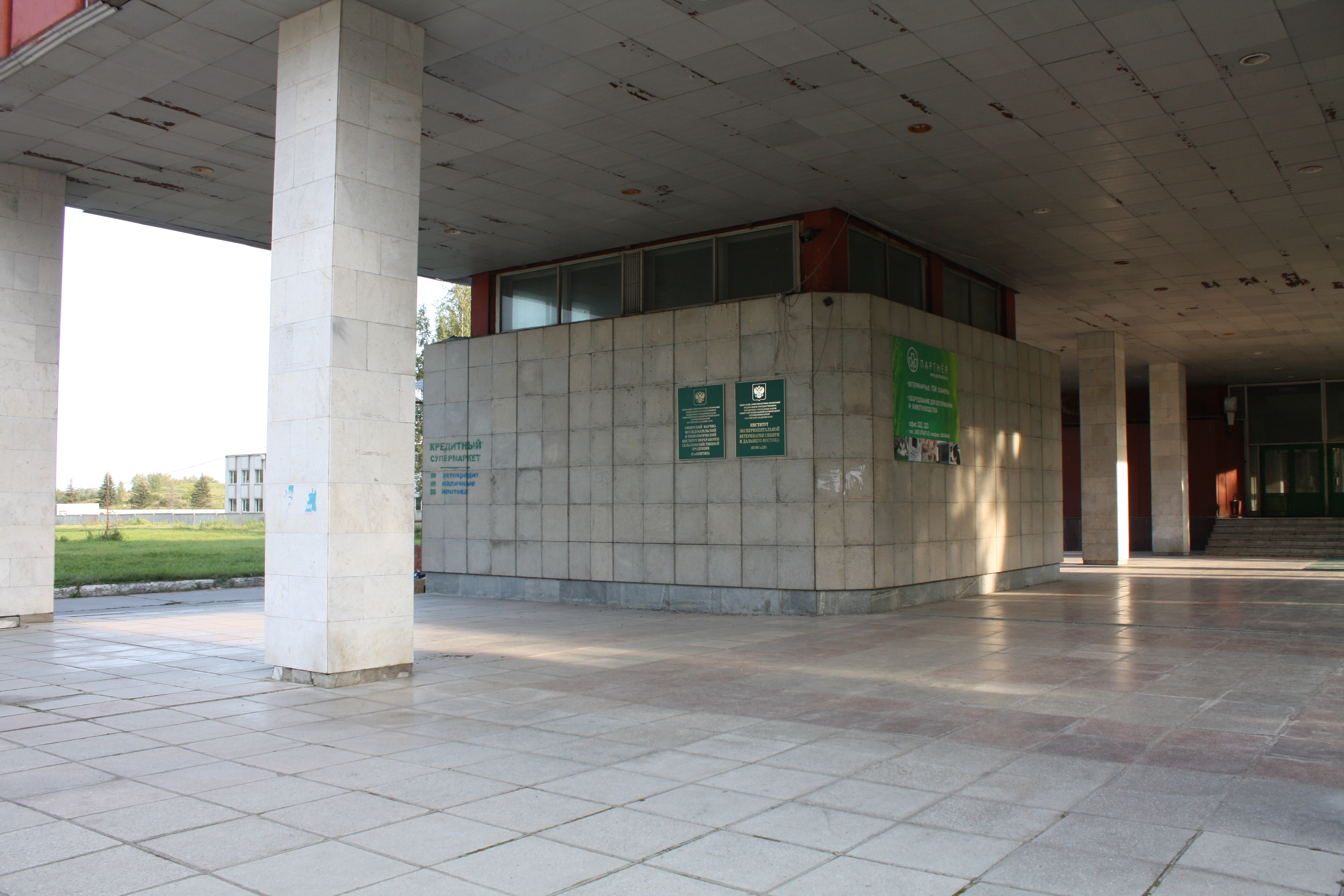
- Established: 1988
- Address: Krasnoobsk, 630501, Russia
- Location: Krasnoobsk, Russia

Siberian Research Technological Design Institute of Processing of Agricultural Products (Russian: Сибирский научно-исследовательский и технологический институт переработки сельскохозяйственной продукции) is a research institute in Krasnoobsk, Novosibirsk Oblast, Russia. It was founded in 1988.

== History ==
The organization was established in 1988 on the basis of subdivisions of scientific institutions of the Siberian Branch of the VASKhNIL and the Siberian Branch of the All-Union Research and Design Institute of the Meat Industry (Novosibirsk), which was transferred to the jurisdiction of the VASKhNIL in 1988.

In 2013, the institute was transferred to the jurisdiction of the Federal Agency for Scientific Organizations.

In 2015 the organization became a structural subdivision of the Siberian Federal Scientific Center for Agrobiotechnologies of the Russian Academy of Sciences.

== Activities ==
The institute is engaged in the development and implementation of waste-free resource-saving technologies for processing, storage and transportation of livestock products, potatoes, cereals, berries, vegetables, fruits; it develops design documentation for equipment, small-sized workshops etc.

== Staff ==
In 1989, 159 people worked at the institute, including 45 researchers (24 candidates of sciences); in 1991, 175 people, including 63 researchers (28 candidates of sciences); in 2001, 48 people, including 18 researchers (10 candidates of sciences, 1 doctor of sciences).
