= Greater Ottawa Kingfish Swim Club =

Swimming club in Ottawa, Canada

Greater Ottawa Kingfish Swim Club (GO Kingfish) is a non-profit, competitive swim club operating in Ottawa, Canada. The club consists of approximately 200 swimmers of all ages, as well as over 100 swimmers in its pre-competitive Junior Group program. The club is affiliated with the University of Ottawa Gee Gees.

The club is a member of the Eastern Ontario Swimming Association, Swim Ontario, and Swimming Canada.

== Coaches ==
- Head coach: Jason Allen
- Associate Head Coach/Youth Coach: Simon St. Pierre
- Senior Kingfish Coach: Tom Langridge
- Central Coach lead: Kaelan Freund
- Bronze, Silver, Gold — East: Marc Patry

== History ==
The club was formed in 1981 when the Gloucester Swim Club and the Ottawa Kingfish Swim Club amalgamated. GO swimmers have competed at the Olympic Games, Commonwealth Games, Pan American Games, Pan Pacific Championships, National Youth Championships, and Canada Games.

- 2011: Kingfish, Own the Podium and Swim Ontario create a high performance Regional Training Centre for swimming and triathlon on the University of Ottawa campus. Derrick Schoof resigns as Gee-Gees' and GO Kingfish swim coach.
- 2009: Derrick Schoof named head coach of GO Kingfish Swim Club and uOttawa men's and women's swimming (July 3, 2009)

== GO Kingfish swimmers on the national and international stage ==
=== 2024 ===
Regan Rathwell participated in 2024 Summer Olympics

=== 2016 ===
Erika Seltenreich-Hodgson and Ashton Baumann represented GO at the Olympics

=== 2013 ===
Erika Seltenreich-Hodgson won three gold and two silver medals at the New South Wales Championships in Sydney, Australia.

=== 2012 ===
Erika Seltenreich-Hodgson won one gold and one bronze medal at the Junior Pan Pacific Swimming Championships. She would also win two gold medals at the Long Course Canadian Championships. Shaylyn Hewton, Connor Michie, Erika Seltenreich-Hodgson, Liam Veregin, and Eli Wall all participated in the Long Course Canadian Age Group Championships. Taylor Moore won one bronze medal at the Coupe Canada. A total of ten swimmers participated in the 2012 Canadian Olympic Trials;

=== 2011 ===
Matthew Hawes participated in the Long Course World Championships in Shanghai; Tabitha Baumann won silver in 200m Freestyle relay at the FINA World Junior Swimming Championships in Lima, Peru; Ashton Baumann, Tabitha Baumann, and Tess Simpson won a combined two gold and one bronze medal at the Summer National Championships; Adam Best and Matt Hawes won a combined one gold and two silver medals at the CIS Championships; Eli Wall won one gold and two silver medals at the Long Course Canadian Age Group Championships; Tabitha Baumann won one silver and one bronze at the Canada Cup; Ashton Baumann, Tabitha Baumann, and Matthew Hawes won a total of one gold, two silver, and two bronze medals at the Coupe Canada; Meghan Michie won four gold medals at the Athens Special Olympics World Summer Games. Meghan Michie was named Special Olympics Female Athlete of the Year.

=== 2010 ===
Matthew Hawes won one silver and one bronze medal at the Pan Pacific Trials. He later participated in the Long Course Canadian Championships with Tess Simpson, with the team winning a total of one gold and two bronze medals. Ashton Baumann, Tabitha Baumann, and Eli Wall won a collective three gold, one silver, and two bronze medals at the Long Course Canadian Age Group Championships. Matt Hawes and Derrick Schoof received the J. Tihanyi bursary.

== Canadian record holders ==
- Matthew Hawes is a Canadian record holder in the 200m Backstroke with a time of 1:57.34.

== Notable alumni ==
- Tabitha Baumann — silver medalist in 4X200m Freestyle relay at the World Youth Championships (2011, Lima, Peru); swam for GO Kingfish until December 2011.
- Matthew Hawes — Canadian record holder in the 200m Backstroke; participated in the 2011 World Aquatics Championships in Shanghai, China and in the 2010 Pan Pacific Swimming Championships; swam for GO Kingfish and University of Ottawa GeeGees until July 2011.
- Yannick Lupien swam for GO Kingfish in the 1990s. He later swam for the Canadian Olympic Team in the 2000 and 2004 Olympics.
- Erika Seltenreich-Hodgson 2016 olympian
- Ashton Baumann 2016 olympian
- Steven Baird 1992 olympian
- Eddie Parenti 1992 Olympian

== Kingfish in the news ==
- Article in Ottawa Citizen on Erika Seltenreich-Hodgson's success at New South Wales Championships
- Article in Orleans Star on GO swimmers participating at Olympic Trials (2012)
- Article on the Regional Training Centre (2011)
- Article on Ashton Baumann in National Post (2011)
- Article in The Star on Meghan Michie's four gold medals at Special Olympics World Summer Games (2011)
- Article in Ottawa Citizen (2011)
- Article in Orleans Star on Alex Babaris (2007)
