= Institute of Experimental Veterinary Science of Siberia and the Far East =

Russian research institute

Institute of Experimental Veterinary Science of Siberia and the Far East (Russian: Институт экспериментальной ветеринарии Сибири и Дальнего Востока) is a research institute in Krasnoobsk, Novosibirsk Oblast, Russia. The organization is a division of the Siberian Federal Scientific Centre of Agro-BioTechnologies of the Russian Academy of Sciences. It was founded in 1974.

== History ==
The institute was established in 1974 on the basis of the Novosibirsk Research Veterinary Station which was organized in January 1940.

In 2015, the Institute became part of the Siberian Federal Scientific Centre of Agro-BioTechnologies of the Russian Academy of Sciences.

== Activities ==
The institute has developed methods of epizootological research, methods and means of combating brucellosis and leukemia in cattle. It investigated the relationship between animal and human tuberculosis, developed a system of pra-allergic reactions to tuberculin in cattle, as well as immunomodulators (vestin and polyvedrin) to increase the protective properties of the BCG vaccine.

The organization has created a test system for differentiating vaccinated animals from patients with brucellosis.

The institute conducted extensive research on necrobacteriosis and developed a system of preventive measures for mass diseases of the limbs of cattle.

The scientific organization developed the veterinary electronic cutimeter for veterinary services of Russia and cattle breeding enterprises. The device is designed for assessment of allergic reactions in the diagnostics of bovine tuberculosis.

== Awards ==
The Institute of Experimental Veterinary Science of Siberia and the Far East was awarded gold and silver medals of the Main Committee of VDNKh.
