= Siberian Research Institute of Plant Cultivation and Breeding =

Research institute in Krasnoobsk, Russia

- Established: 1926
- Director: Ivan Likhenko
- Owner: Siberian Branch of the Russian Academy of Sciences
- Address: Krasnoobsk, 630501, Russia
- Location: Krasnoobsk, Russia

Siberian Research Institute of Plant Cultivation and Breeding (Russian: Сибирский научно-исследовательский институт растениеводства и селекции) is a research institute in Krasnoobsk, Russia. It was founded in 1926. In 2015, the institute became a branch of the Institute of Cytology and Genetics.

== History ==
In 1926, the Central Siberian Regional Agricultural Experimental Station was organized, on the basis of which the West Siberian Regional Experimental Station of Grain Farming was created in 1936. Two years later, the Experimental Station was reorganized into the Novosibirsk State Breeding Station. In 1956, the station was transformed into the Novosibirsk State Agricultural Experimental Station.

In 1972, on the basis of the station, the Siberian branch of the All-Union Research Institute of Plant Industry was organized with 122 employees, the branch was engaged in the study of the gene pool of agricultural plants. In 1977, the branch of the institute was reorganized into the Siberian Research Institute of Plant Cultivation and Breeding (SibNIIRS). In the same year, the new research institute became the center of grain crops. Its area of activity included the Novosibirsk, Kemerovo and Tomsk oblasts.

== Activities ==
The institute is working on the creation of a Siberian gene pool of agricultural crops. It also creates crop hybrids with increased productivity, as well as resistant varieties. SibNIIRS has developed methods for breeding of new plant species using diploidization, introgressive hybridization, alloplasmia and aneuploidy. The breeders of the institute have developed varieties of spring wheat with a high level of gluten (28–30%) and protein (14–16%), as well as new varieties of oats.

Drought-resistant and non-crumbling varieties of peas have been created, which are suitable for harvesting by direct combining and are resistant to ascochitosis. The institute has developed various varieties of vegetables resistant to phytosporosis, bacteriosis and peronosporosis.

== Plant collections ==
The scientific organization has a collection of plants from all over the world. The institute has created a collection of perennial bows consisting of 308 samples (90 of them grow in Altai and Siberia).

== Examples of bred varieties ==
- Yegipetskaya Sila is a sweet pepper variety with a high content of vitamin C.
- Pamyati Gubko is a variety of tomato with a slightly spicy taste. The variety was named in honor of the breeder Valentina Gubko.
- Yashka-Tsygan is a cultivar of basil.
- Bogaty Urozhay is a variety of cucumber.

== Leaders ==
- S. G. Alekseyev (1936–1939)
- D. I. Nekrasov (1939)
- A. Z. Bolgov (1939–1940)
- N. P. Smirnov (1940–1941, 1946–1952 and 1956–1961)
- I. F. Vasiliev (1941–1946)
- G. A. Nalivaiko (1952–1956), Hero of Socialist Labor
- A. K. Chepikov (1961–1976)
- P. L. Goncharov (1976–?), academician of VASKhNIL

== Bibliography ==
- Ламин В. А. (2003). Энциклопедия. Новосибирск. Новосибирск: Новосибирское книжное издательство. p. 227. ISBN 5-7620-0968-8.
