= Michael Jamieson =

Scottish swimmer (born 1988)

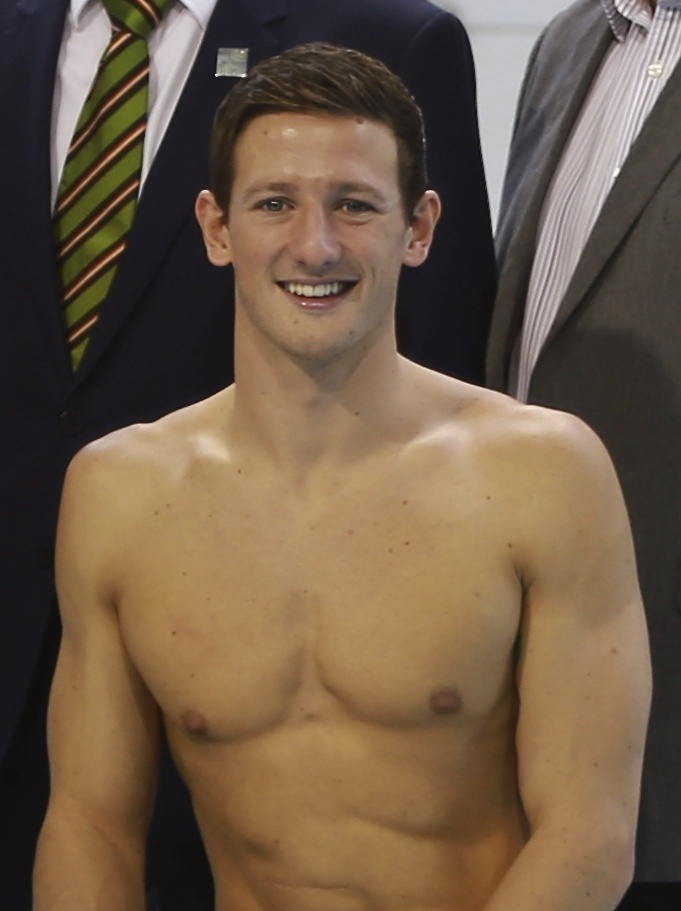

Personal information
- Full name: Michael Jamieson
- National team: Great Britain
- Born: 5 August 1988 (age 38) Glasgow, Scotland
- Height: 1.86 m (6 ft 1 in)
- Weight: 81 kg (179 lb)

Sport
- Sport: Swimming
- Strokes: Breaststroke
- Club: National Performance Centre
- College team: University of Bath
Medal record
Men's swimming
Representing United Kingdom
Olympic Games
Silver medal – second place	2012 London	200 m breaststroke
World Championships (SC)
Silver medal – second place	2012 Istanbul	200 m breaststroke
European Championships (SC)
Silver medal – second place	2013 Herning	200 m breaststroke
Bronze medal – third place	2011 Szczecin	200 m breaststroke
Representing Scotland
Commonwealth Games
Silver medal – second place	2010 Delhi	200 m breaststroke
Silver medal – second place	2014 Glasgow	200 m breaststroke

Michael Jamieson (born 5 August 1988) is a Scottish former competitive swimmer who represented Great Britain at the Olympics, FINA world championships and European championships, and Scotland in the Commonwealth Games. Jamieson won the silver medal in the men's 200-metre breaststroke at the 2012 Summer Olympics.

== Personal life ==
His father, also named Michael, was a professional footballer who played for Albion Rovers, Alloa Athletic and Stenhousemuir in the 1980s. Jamieson also played football, but decided to focus on swimming when he was thirteen years old.

He currently resides in Glasgow.

== Swimming career ==
Competing for Great Britain at the 2012 Summer Olympics, he won a silver medal behind his arch-rival Dániel Gyurta in the 200-metre breaststroke. He broke the British record three times in the process, twice in the qualifying heats and once in the final (2:07.43), and came to within 0.12 seconds of the previous world record set by Christian Sprenger in 2009 (2:07.31). Only a new world record by two-time world 200 m breaststroke champion Dániel Gyurta denied Jamieson the gold.

He previously competed in the men's 100-metre breaststroke, finishing in 3rd place in the second semifinal, but failed to reach the final.

At the 2014 Commonwealth Games, he won a silver medal in the 200 m breaststroke behind Ross Murdoch.

He retired from competitive swimming in 2016 and began working as a swimming coach.

== Honours ==
Jamieson was inducted into the Scottish Swimming Hall of Fame in 2018.

== See also ==
- List of Olympic medalists in swimming (men)
