= Krasnoobsk =

Krasnoobsk Краснообск
- Work settlement
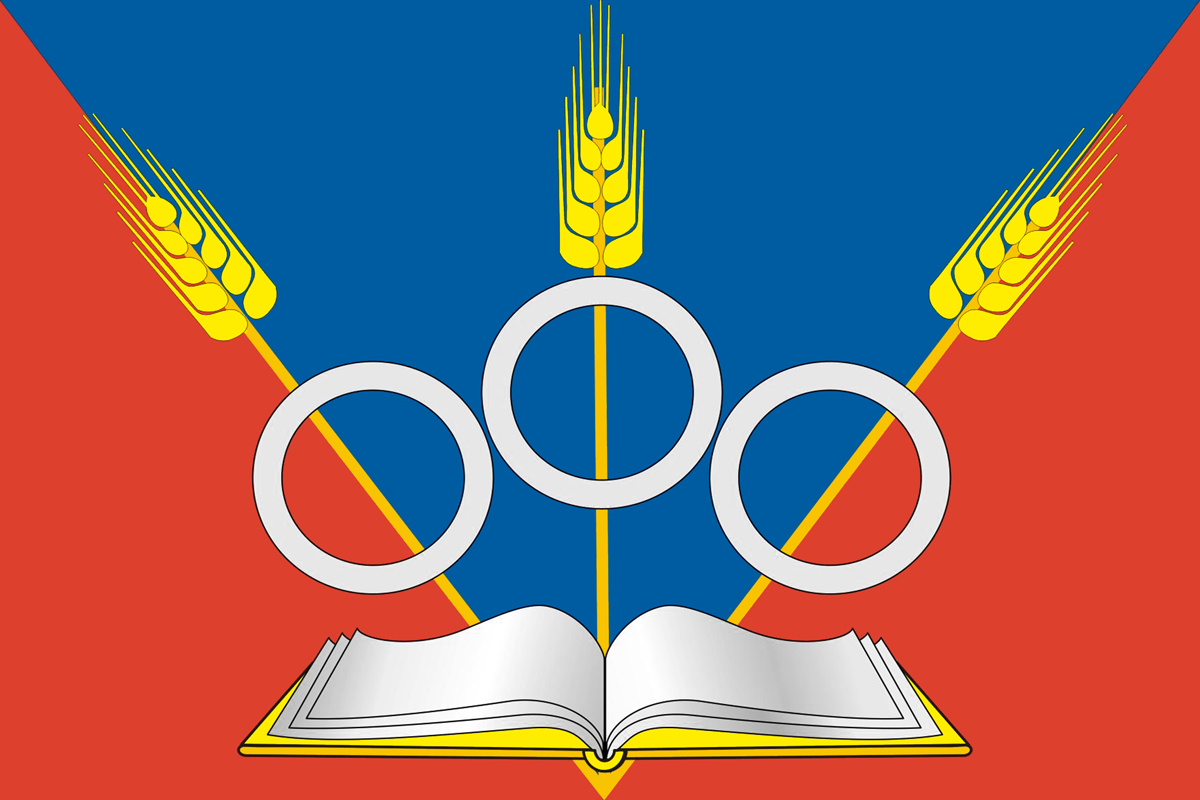
- Flag
- Interactive map of Krasnoobsk
- Location of Krasnoobsk Krasnoobsk (Novosibirsk Oblast)
- Coordinates: 54°55′N 82°59′E
- Country: Russia
- Federal subject: Novosibirsk Oblast
- Founded: 1970

Government
  - Leader: Tatyana Essaulenko
- Elevation: 105 m (344 ft)

Population
  - Estimate (2025): 23,768 )
- Time zone: UTC+7 (MSK+4)
- Postal code: 630501
- OKTMO ID: 50640154051
- Website: krasnoobsk.nso.ru

Krasnoobsk (Russian: Краснообск) is an urban locality (a work settlement) in Novosibirsky District of Novosibirsk Oblast, Russia, located southeast of Novosibirsk's Kirovsky City District. Krasnoobsk is a Science town (Naukograd) of the Russian Federation. Population: 23,768.

== History ==
Krasnoobsk was founded in 1970.

== Research institutes ==
- Siberian Research Institute of Animal Husbandry
- Siberian Research Institute of Mechanization and Electrification of Agriculture
- Siberian Research Institute of forages
- Institute of Experimental Veterinary Science of Siberia and the Far East
- Siberian Research Institute of Soil Management and Chemicalization of Agriculture
- Siberian Research Institute of Economics of Agriculture
- Siberian Physical-Technical Institute of Agrarian Problems
- Siberian Research Technological Design Institute of Processing of Agricultural Products
- Siberian Research Institute of Plant Cultivation and Breeding

== Libraries ==
- Siberian Scientific Agricultural Library
- Central District Library

== Green spaces ==
- Krasnoobsk Arboretum
- Forest Park named after Irakly Sinyagin

== Gallery ==
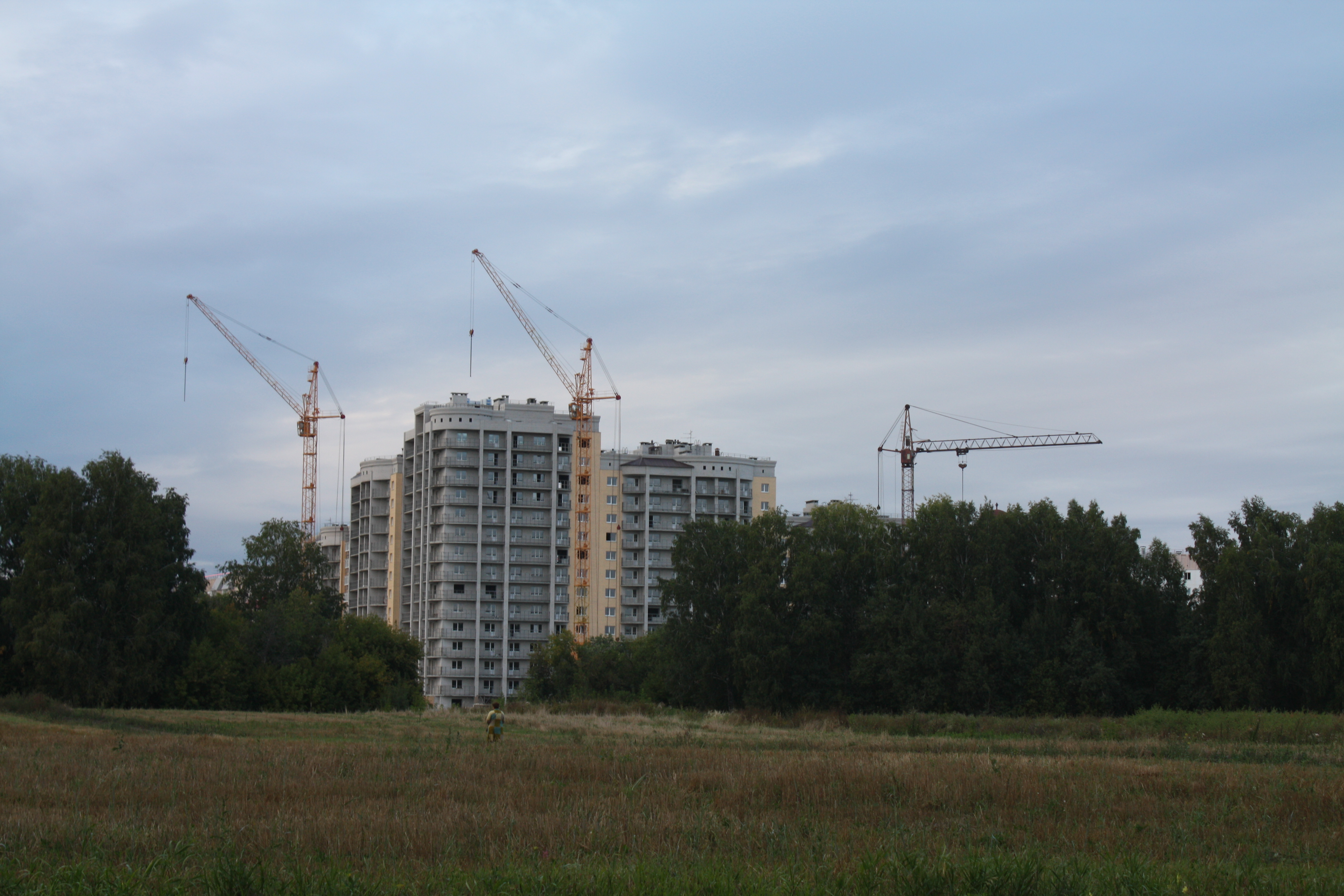

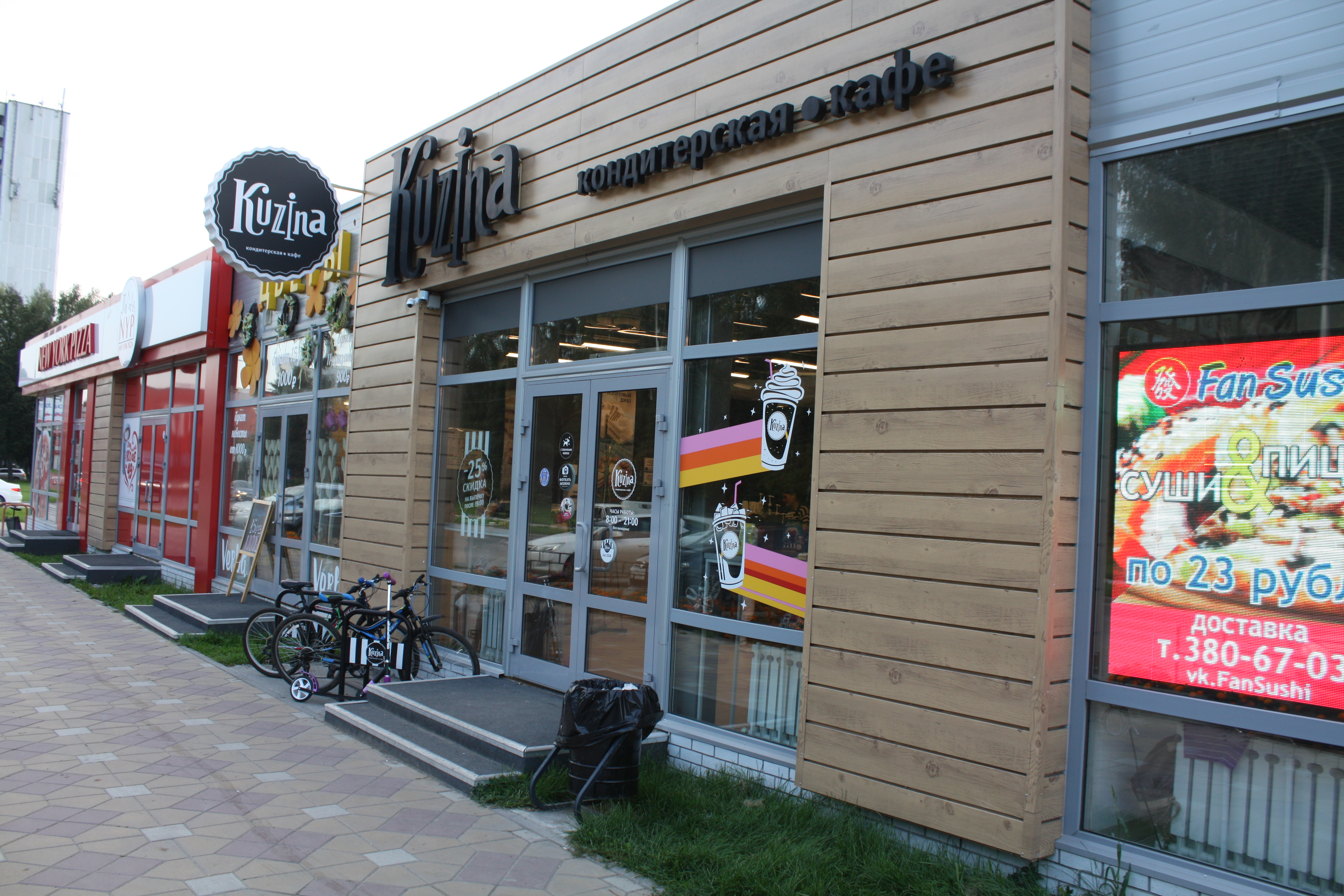
Kuzina in Krasnoobsk

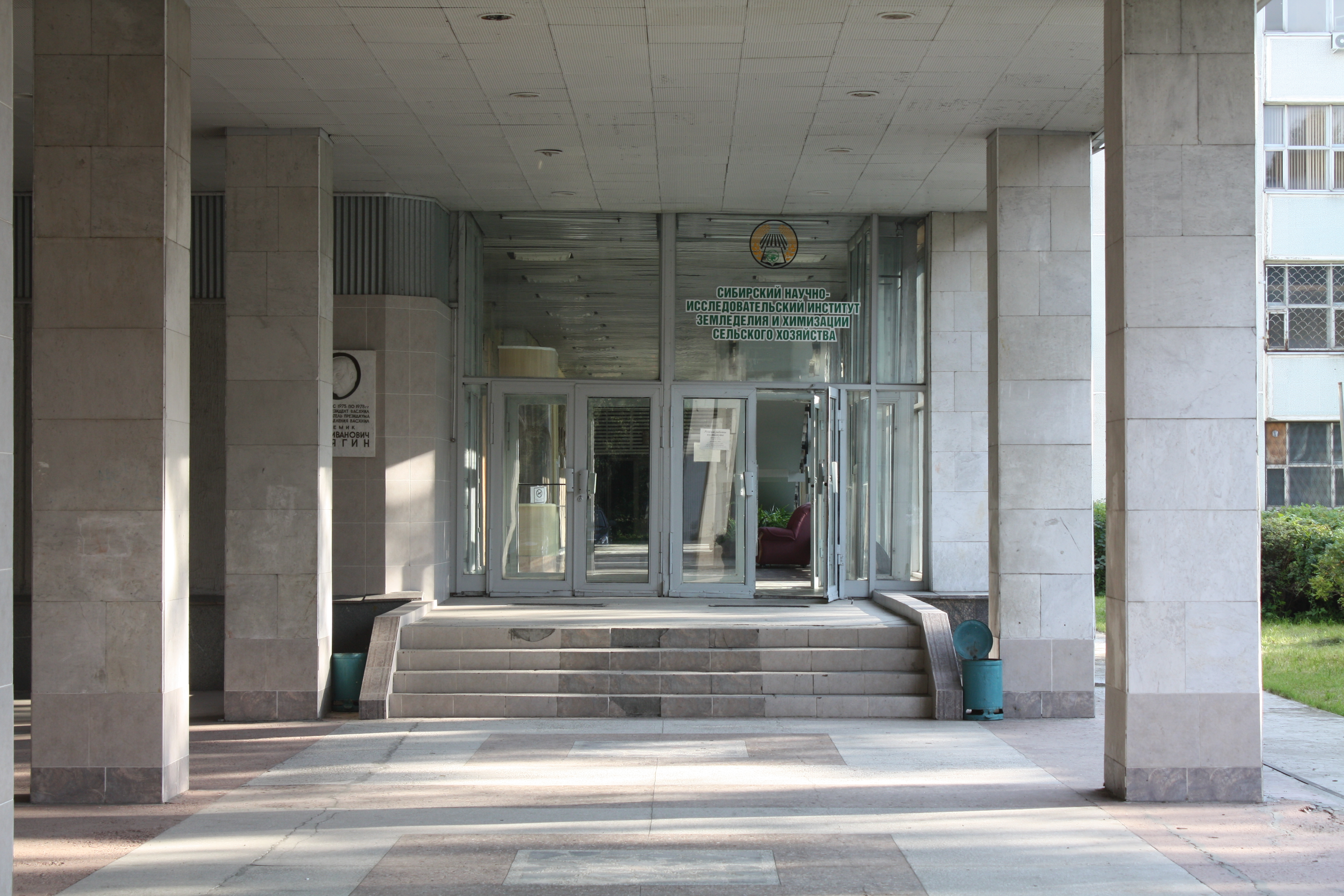

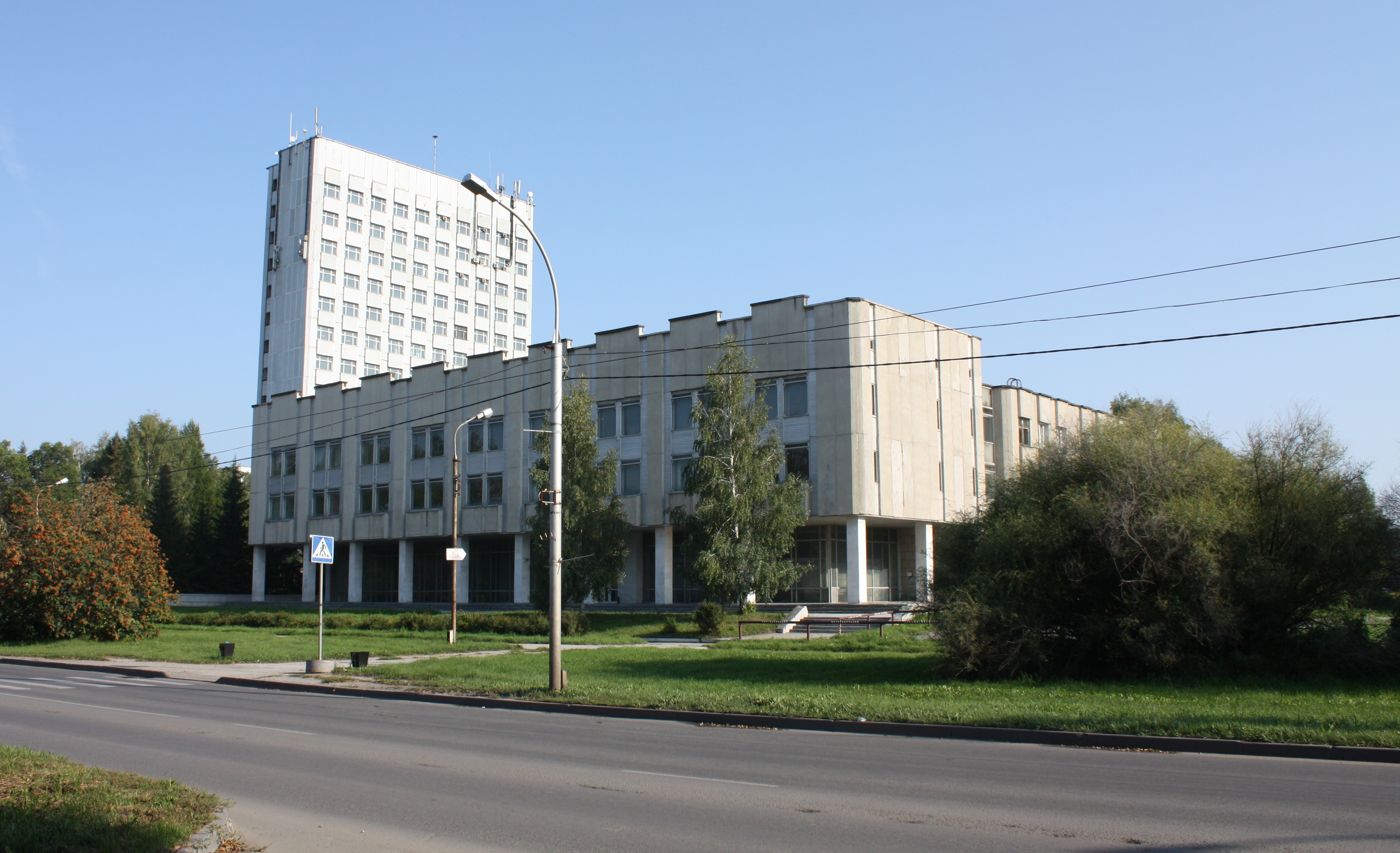

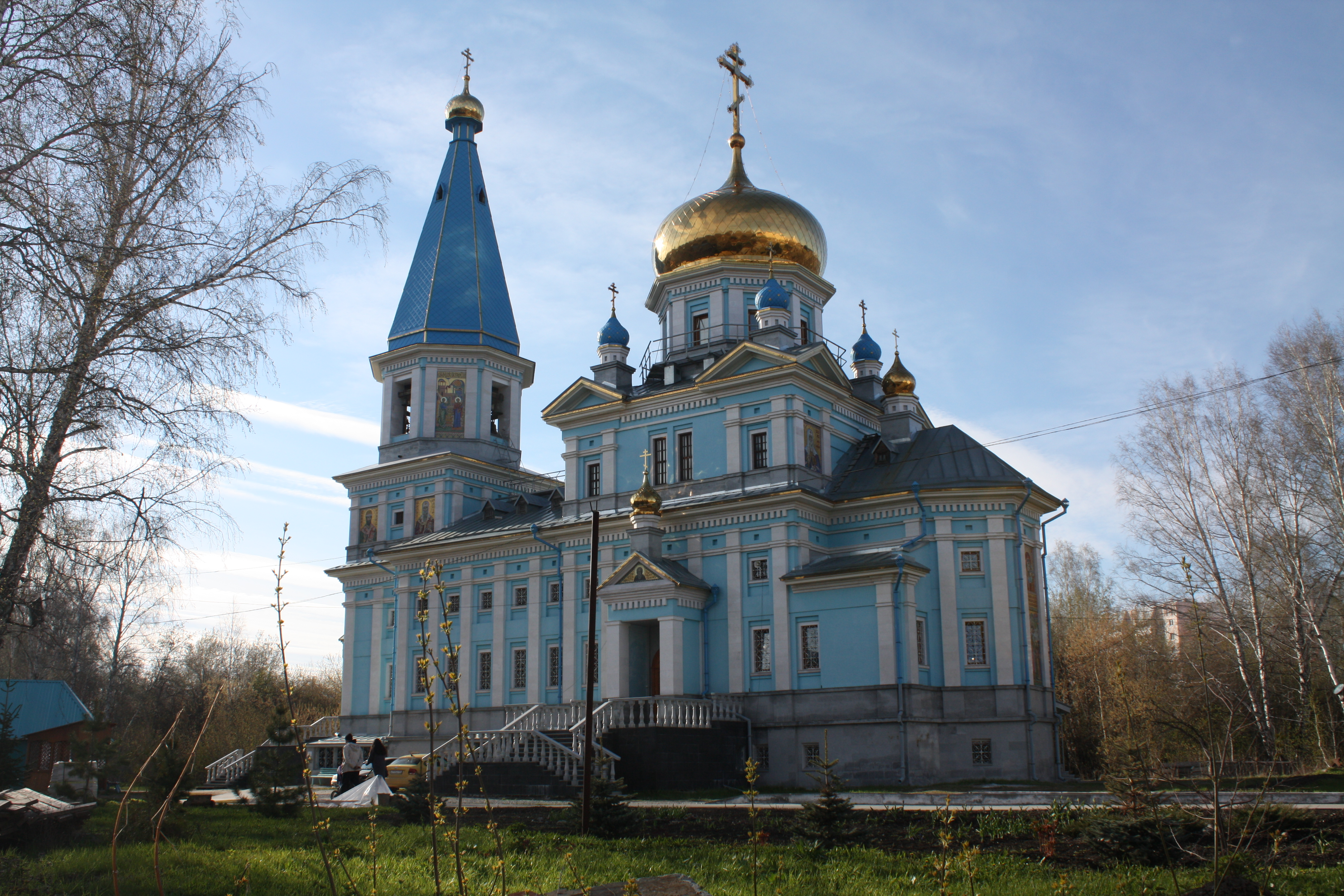
Sergiev-Kazan Church
