= Scott Weltz =

American competition swimmer

Personal information
- Full name: Scott William Weltz
- Nickname: Scotty
- National team: United States
- Born: March 19, 1987 (age 39) San Jose, California, U.S.
- Height: 6 ft 0 in (182.9 cm)
- Weight: 181 lb (82 kg)

Sport
- Sport: Swimming
- Strokes: Breaststroke, individual medley
- Club: Marin Pirates
- College team: University of California, Davis

Scott William Weltz (born March 19, 1987) is an American competition swimmer who specializes in breaststroke events. Weltz was a member of the 2012 United States Olympic team, and placed fifth in the 200-meter breaststroke event at the 2012 Summer Olympics.

== Early years ==
Weltz was born in San Jose, California. He was a member of the San Jose Aquatics Club from the age of 7. He swam while attending Bellarmine College Preparatory in San Jose. He attended the University of California, Davis. Weltz was coached by Peter Motekaitis before the men's swim program was terminated at UC Davis.

=== 2012 Summer Olympics ===
At the 2012 U.S. Olympic Trials in Omaha, Nebraska, the U.S. qualifying meet for the Olympics, Weltz made the U.S. Olympic team for the first time by finishing first in the 200-meter breaststroke with a time of 2:09.01. Weltz also finished fourth in the 100-meter breaststroke with a time of 1:00.68. At the 2012 Summer Olympics in London, Weltz placed fifth in the finals of the 200-meter breaststroke with a time of 2:09.02. His semifinal time the day before (2:08.99) and Olympic Trial time (2:09.01) showed remarkable consistency.
