= Kuzin =

Kuzin or Kouzine (Russian: Кузин) is a Russian masculine surname, its feminine counterpart is Kuzina or Kouzina. The surname is derived from the male given name Kuzma or Kosma, which in turn originates from the Greek κόσμος (kosmos), meaning order of the universe. It may refer to:

- Aramis Kouzine (born 1998), Canadian association football player
- Denis Kuzin (born 1989), Kazakhstani speed skater
- Elizaveta Kuzina (born 2003), Russian diver
- Marina Kuzina (born 1985), Russian basketball player
- Olexandr Kuzin (born 1974), Ukrainian long-distance runner
- Sergey Kuzin (born 1971), Russian motorcycle speedway rider
- Svetlana Kuzina (born 1975), Russian water polo player
- Valentin Kuzin (1926–1994), Russian ice hockey player
- Vladimir Kuzin (1930–2007), Russian cross-country skier
- Yulia Kuzina (born 1976), Russian judoka
