= Clark Burckle =

American swimmer

Personal information
- Full name: Christopher Clark Burckle Jr.
- Nickname: Burke
- National team: United States
- Born: February 23, 1988 (age 38) Louisville, Kentucky, U.S.
- Height: 6 ft 1 in (185 cm)
- Weight: 205 lb (93 kg)
- Spouse: Mallory Comerford

Sport
- Sport: Swimming
- Strokes: Breaststroke, individual medley
- Club: Lakeside Swim Team
- College team: University of Florida; University of Arizona
Medal record
Men's swimming
Representing the United States
Pan American Games
Silver medal – second place	2011 Guadalajara	200 m breaststroke
Representing the Arizona Wildcats
Event	1st	2nd	3rd
NCAA Championships	1	0	0
Total	1	0	0
NCAA Championships
Gold medal – first place	2010 Columbus	200 y breaststroke

Christopher Clark Burckle Jr. (born February 23, 1988) is an American competition swimmer who specializes in breaststroke and medley events. He competed in the 200-meter breaststroke at the 2012 Summer Olympics.

Burckle was born in Louisville, Kentucky. He attended St. Xavier High School in Louisville, and was a member of St. Xavier Tigers Sharks high school swim team. He was raised in an athletic family. His father Chris swam at the University of Louisville and his mother Jill played tennis for the University of California, Santa Barbara and Indiana University. His older sister Caroline swam for the University of Florida and was an Olympic bronze medalist.

Burckle initially attended the University of Florida in Gainesville, Florida, where he swam for coach Gregg Troy's Florida Gators swimming and diving team in National Collegiate Athletic Association (NCAA) competition from 2006 to 2008. For his senior year in 2010, he transferred to the University of Arizona in Tucson, Arizona, where he swam for the Arizona Wildcats swimming team. Burckle won the NCAA championship in the 200-yard breaststroke while at the University of Arizona, helping the Wildcats to a third-place team finish at the NCAA national championship in 2010.

He was a finalist in the 200-meter breaststroke and 400-meter individual medley events at the 2008 United States Olympic Trials. At the 2012 United States Olympic Trials, Burckle finished second in the 200-meter breaststroke with a time of 2:09.97, qualifying to compete at the 2012 Olympics. At the 2012 Summer Olympics in London, he finished sixth in the 200-meter breaststroke final with a time of 2:09.25.

Clark completed his MBA at the Stanford Graduate School of Business in 2015 and has been working for Sports' Media startup FloSports in Austin, Texas.

== See also ==
- List of University of Arizona people
- List of University of Florida alumni
