= Swimming at the 2012 Summer Olympics – Men's 200 metre breaststroke =

Men's 200 metre breaststroke at the Games of the XXX Olympiad
- Venue: London Aquatics Centre
- Date: July 31, 2012 (heats & semifinals); August 1, 2012 (final)
- Competitors: 34 from 28 nations
- Winning time: 2:07.28 WR

Medalists
1st place, gold medalist(s)		Dániel Gyurta	Hungary
2nd place, silver medalist(s)		Michael Jamieson	Great Britain
3rd place, bronze medalist(s)		Ryo Tateishi	Japan

The men's 200 metre breaststroke event at the 2012 Summer Olympics took place on 31 July and 1 August at the London Aquatics Centre in London, United Kingdom.

Hungary's Dániel Gyurta blasted the field with a stunning world record to become the country's third gold medalist in the event since József Szabó topped the podium in 1988 and Norbert Rózsa in 1996. Turning second at the halfway mark, he threw down a remarkable time of 2:07.28 on the final stretch to shave 0.03 seconds off the record set by Australia's Christian Sprenger in a since-banned high tech bodysuit from the 2009 World Championships. With the delight of a raucous home crowd, Great Britain's Michael Jamieson enjoyed the race of his life to snatch the silver in 2:07.43, moving him up to fourth in the event's all time rankings. Meanwhile, Japan's Ryo Tateishi powered home with a bronze in 2:08.29 to edge out Kosuke Kitajima (2:08.35) by six-hundredths of a second, ending the defending champion's hopes for an Olympic three-peat bid.

U.S. swimmer Scott Weltz finished fifth in 2:09.02 to hold off his teammate Clark Burckle (2:09.25) by 23-hundredths of a second. Australia's Brenton Rickard (2:09.28), the reigning silver medalist, and Great Britain's home favorite Andrew Willis (2:09.44) rounded out the championship field.

Notable swimmers missed the final roster featuring Lithuania's Giedrius Titenis, a top eight finalist in the 100 m breaststroke; and Luxembourg's Laurent Carnol, who became the nation's first ever semifinalist in swimming.

== Records ==
Prior to this competition, the existing world and Olympic records were as follows.

World record	Christian Sprenger (AUS)	2:07.31	Rome, Italy	30 July 2009
Olympic record	Kosuke Kitajima (JPN)	2:07.64	Beijing, China	14 August 2008

The following records were established during the competition:

Date	Event	Name	Nationality	Time	Record
August 1	Final	Dániel Gyurta	Hungary	2:07.28	WR

== Results ==
=== Heats ===
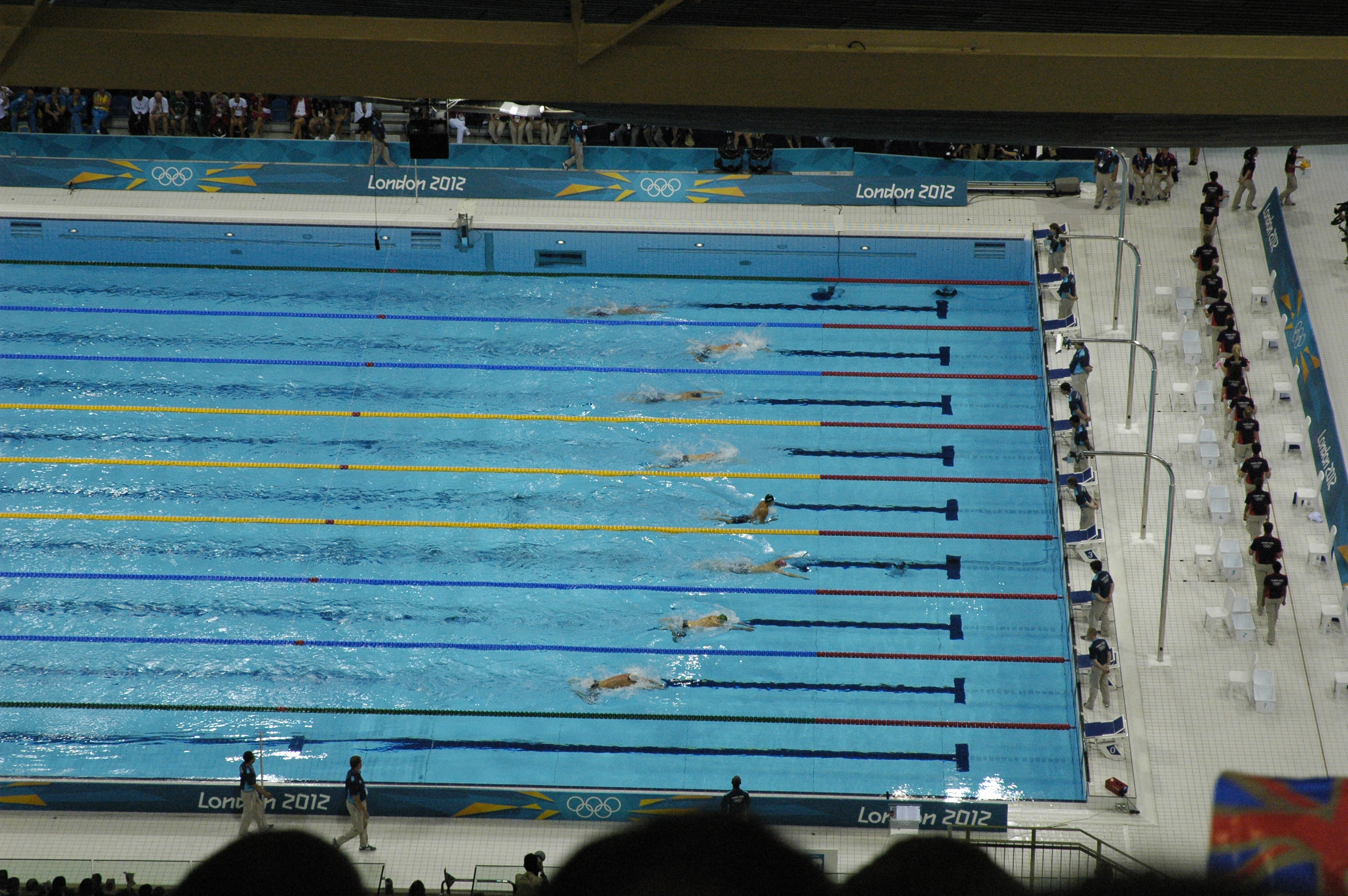
Men's 200m Breaststroke heat 5

Rank	Heat	Lane	Name	Nationality	Time	Notes
1	3	4	Dániel Gyurta	Hungary	2:08.71	Q
2	3	6	Michael Jamieson	Great Britain	2:08.98	Q, NR
3	5	3	Andrew Willis	Great Britain	2:09.33	Q
4	4	4	Ryo Tateishi	Japan	2:09.37	Q
5	5	4	Kosuke Kitajima	Japan	2:09.43	Q
6	4	3	Clark Burckle	United States	2:09.55	Q
7	3	5	Scott Weltz	United States	2:09.67	Q
8	5	2	Giedrius Titenis	Lithuania	2:10.36	Q
9	4	7	Vyacheslav Sinkevich	Russia	2:10.48	Q
10	3	2	Glenn Snyders	New Zealand	2:10.55	Q, NR
11	5	5	Marco Koch	Germany	2:10.61	Q
12	5	6	Laurent Carnol	Luxembourg	2:10.83	Q
13	2	4	Scott Dickens	Canada	2:10.95	Q
14	4	2	Tales Cerdeira	Brazil	2:11.05	Q
15	5	7	Brenton Rickard	Australia	2:11.41	Q
16	4	5	Christian vom Lehn	Germany	2:11.66	Q
17	3	8	Matti Mattsson	Finland	2:11.81	NR
18	5	1	Lennart Stekelenburg	Netherlands	2:12.02	
19	4	6	Henrique Barbosa	Brazil	2:12.05	
20	4	1	Ákos Molnár	Hungary	2:12.42	
21	2	5	Sławomir Kuczko	Poland	2:12.51	
22	3	1	Igor Borysik	Ukraine	2:12.61	
23	2	2	Tomáš Klobučník	Slovakia	2:13.40	
24	4	8	Yannick Käser	Switzerland	2:13.49	
25	3	7	Choi Kyu-woong	South Korea	2:13.57	
26	2	3	Christian Schurr Voight	Mexico	2:14.16	
27	3	3	Panagiotis Samilidis	Greece	2:14.82	
28	1	4	Irakli Bolkvadze	Georgia	2:15.86	NR
29	2	7	Hunor Mate	Austria	2:15.98	
30	2	6	Nuttapong Ketin	Thailand	2:16.07	
31	2	1	Jakob Jóhann Sveinsson	Iceland	2:16.72	
32	1	5	Dmitrii Aleksandrov	Kyrgyzstan	2:17.92	
33	5	8	Chen Cheng	China	2:19.83	
	1	3	Tsilavina Ramanantsoa	Madagascar	DSQ	

=== Semifinals ===
==== Semifinal 1 ====
Rank	Lane	Name	Nationality	Time	Notes
1	4	Michael Jamieson	Great Britain	2:08.20	Q, NR
2	3	Clark Burckle	United States	2:09.11	Q
3	5	Ryo Tateishi	Japan	2:09.13	Q
4	1	Tales Cerdeira	Brazil	2:09.77	
5	6	Giedrius Titenis	Lithuania	2:09.95	
6	8	Christian vom Lehn	Germany	2:10.50	
7	2	Glenn Snyders	New Zealand	2:11.14	
8	7	Laurent Carnol	Luxembourg	2:11.17	

==== Semifinal 2 ====
Rank	Lane	Name	Nationality	Time	Notes
1	4	Dániel Gyurta	Hungary	2:08.32	Q
2	5	Andrew Willis	Great Britain	2:08.47	Q
3	6	Scott Weltz	United States	2:08.99	Q
4	3	Kosuke Kitajima	Japan	2:09.03	Q
5	8	Brenton Rickard	Australia	2:09.31	Q
6	2	Vyacheslav Sinkevich	Russia	2:09.90	
7	7	Marco Koch	Germany	2:10.73	
8	1	Scott Dickens	Canada	2:11.71	

=== Final ===
Rank	Lane	Name	Nationality	Time	Notes
1st place, gold medalist(s)	5	Dániel Gyurta	Hungary	2:07.28	WR
2nd place, silver medalist(s)	4	Michael Jamieson	Great Britain	2:07.43	NR
3rd place, bronze medalist(s)	1	Ryo Tateishi	Japan	2:08.29	
4	2	Kosuke Kitajima	Japan	2:08.35	
5	6	Scott Weltz	United States	2:09.02	
6	7	Clark Burckle	United States	2:09.25	
7	8	Brenton Rickard	Australia	2:09.28	
8	3	Andrew Willis	Great Britain	2:09.44	
