= Swimming at the 2010 South American Games – Men's 200 metre breaststroke =

The Men's 200m breaststroke event at the 2010 South American Games was held on March 29, with the heats at 10:09 and the Final at 18:00.

== Medalists ==
Gold	Silver	Bronze
Thiago Pereira; Brazil	Jorge Murillo; Colombia	Rodrigo Frutos; Argentina

== Records ==
Standing records prior to the 2010 South American Games
World record	Christian Sprenger (AUS)	2:07.31	Rome, Italy	30 July 2009
Competition Record	Thiago Parravicini (BRA)	2:17.94	Buenos Aires, Argentina	18 November 2006
South American record	Henrique Barbosa (BRA)	2:08.44	Rio de Janeiro, Brazil	6 May 2009

== Results ==
=== Heats ===
Rank	Heat	Lane	Athlete	Result	Notes
1	2	4	Thiago Pereira (BRA)	2:22.55	Q
2	1	4	Jorge Murillo (COL)	2:23.01	Q
3	2	5	Rodrigo Frutos (ARG)	2:23.46	Q
4	2	3	Leopoldo Andara (VEN)	2:24.16	Q
5	1	6	Alex Solorzano Castro (ECU)	2:24.91	Q
6	2	6	Diego Bonilla (COL)	2:30.52	Q
7	1	3	Gonzalo Martin Acuna (ARG)	2:31.76	Q
8	2	1	Hugo Pastore (PAR)	2:35.92	Q
9	1	2	Pedro Llamosas (PER)	2:36.44	
10	2	2	Mario Sergio Chicot (PER)	2:36.83	
11	1	7	Jose Guillermo Sierra (ECU)	2:39.23	
	1	5	Felipe Silva (BRA)	DNS	
	2	7	Diguan Pigot (SUR)	DSQ	

=== Final ===
Rank	Lane	Athlete	Result	Notes
1st place, gold medalist(s)	4	Thiago Pereira (BRA)	2:16.89	CR
2nd place, silver medalist(s)	5	Jorge Murillo (COL)	2:17.71	
3rd place, bronze medalist(s)	3	Rodrigo Frutos (ARG)	2:20.84	
4	6	Leopoldo Andara (VEN)	2:21.43	
5	2	Alex Solorzano Castro (ECU)	2:24.03	
6	7	Diego Bonilla (COL)	2:29.31	
7	1	Gonzalo Martin Acuna (ARG)	2:34.28	
8	8	Hugo Pastore (PAR)	2:38.34	
