= Swimming at the 2010 South American Games – Men's 100 metre breaststroke =

The Men's 100m breaststroke event at the 2010 South American Games was held on March 26, with the heats at 10:58 and the Final at 18:41.

== Medalists ==
Gold	Silver	Bronze
Felipe Silva; Brazil	Jorge Murillo; Colombia	João Gomes Jr. Brazil

== Records ==
Standing records prior to the 2010 South American Games
World record	Brenton Rickard (AUS)	58.58	Rome, Italy	27 July 2009
Competition Record	Eduardo Fischer (BRA)	1:03.34	Buenos Aires, Argentina	15 November 2006
South American record	Henrique Barbosa (BRA)	59.03	Rio de Janeiro, Brazil	10 May 2009

== Results ==
=== Heats ===
Rank	Heat	Lane	Athlete	Result	Notes
1	2	4	Felipe Silva (BRA)	1:04.72	Q
2	3	5	Genaro Marias Britez (PAR)	1:04.95	Q
3	3	4	João Gomes Jr. (BRA)	1:05.22	Q
4	1	4	Jorge Murillo (COL)	1:05.39	Q
5	3	3	Renato David Fernandez (PAR)	1:05.61	Q
6	2	5	Lucas Eugenio Peralta (ARG)	1:05.84	Q
7	3	6	Martin Melconian (URU)	1:05.85	Q
8	1	3	Leopoldo Andara (VEN)	1:05.89	Q
9	1	6	Alex Javier Castro (ECU)	1:06.15	
10	1	5	Gonzalo Martin Acuna (ARG)	1:06.30	
11	2	3	Diego Bonilla (COL)	1:06.72	
12	3	2	Jose Guillermo Sierra (ECU)	1:07.95	
13	3	7	Diguan Pigot (SUR)	1:08.79	
14	1	2	Ricardo Pablo Salgado (CHI)	1:09.10	
15	2	6	Pedro Pablo Llamosas (PER)	1:09.48	
16	2	2	Erick Arturo Medina (PAN)	1:09.90	
17	3	1	Jordy Groters (ARU)	1:11.12	
18	1	7	Mario Sergio Chicot (PER)	1:12.48	
	2	7	Jair Boerenveen (SUR)	DNS	

=== Final ===
Rank	Lane	Athlete	Result	Notes
1st place, gold medalist(s)	4	Felipe Silva (BRA)	1:02.87	CR
2nd place, silver medalist(s)	6	Jorge Murillo (COL)	1:03.49	
3rd place, bronze medalist(s)	3	João Gomes Jr. (BRA)	1:03.82	
4	5	Genaro Marias Britez (PAR)	1:04.65	
5	2	Renato David Fernandez (PAR)	1:04.91	
6	7	Lucas Eugenio Peralta (ARG)	1:05.33	
7	1	Martin Melconian (URU)	1:05.77	
8	8	Leopoldo Andara (VEN)	1:05.83	
