= Carlos Mahecha =

Colombian swimmer (born 1992)

Personal information
- Full name: Carlos Arturo Mahecha Pinto
- National team: Colombia
- Born: 10 October 1992 (age 33)

Sport
- Sport: Swimming
- Strokes: Breaststroke
Medal record
Representing Colombia
Men's swimming
Event	1st	2nd	3rd
CAC Games	0	1	1
South American Games	0	1	2
South American Championships	0	2	5
Bolivarian Games	0	1	1
Total	0	5	9
Central American and Caribbean Games
Silver medal – second place	2018 Barranquilla	4×100 m medley
Bronze medal – third place	2018 Barranquilla	50 m breaststroke
South American Games
Silver medal – second place	2018 Cochabamba	200 m breaststroke
Bronze medal – third place	2018 Cochabamba	100 m breaststroke
Bronze medal – third place	2018 Cochabamba	4×100 m freestyle
South American Championships
Silver medal – second place	2016 Asunción	200 m breaststroke
Silver medal – second place	2018 Trujillo	200 m breaststroke
Bronze medal – third place	2014 Mar del Plata	200 m breaststroke
Bronze medal – third place	2014 Mar del Plata	4×100 m medley
Bronze medal – third place	2014 Mar del Plata	4×100 m mixed medley
Bronze medal – third place	2018 Trujillo	100 m breaststroke
Bronze medal – third place	2018 Trujillo	4×100 m freestyle
Bolivarian Games
Silver medal – second place	2017 Santa Marta	4×100 m freestyle
Bronze medal – third place	2017 Santa Marta	200 m breaststroke

Carlos Arturo Mahecha Pinto (Note: In this Spanish name, the first or paternal surname is Mahecha and the second or maternal family name is Pinto.) (born 10 October 1992) is a Colombian swimmer. He represented Colombia at the 2019 World Aquatics Championships in Gwangju, South Korea. He competed in the men's 200 metre breaststroke event where he did not advance to compete in the semi-finals.

In 2018, he won the bronze medal in the men's 50 metre breaststroke event at the Central American and Caribbean Games held in Barranquilla, Colombia. In 2019, he competed in the men's 100 metre breaststroke and men's 200 metre breaststroke events at the 2019 Pan American Games held in Lima, Peru. He also competed in the men's 4 × 100 metre medley relay event.
