= Ashton Baumann =

Canadian swimmer (born 1993)

Personal information
- National team: Canada
- Born: January 5, 1993 (age 33) Southport, Queensland, Australia
- Height: 191 cm (6 ft 3 in)
- Weight: 74 kg (163 lb)

Sport
- Sport: Swimming
- Strokes: Breaststroke

Ashton Baumann (born January 5, 1993) is a Canadian competition swimmer who specializes in the breaststroke. Baumann competed for Canada at the 2016 Summer Olympics in the 200 m breaststroke. He is the son of former Canadian Olympic swimmer Alex Baumann.

He relocated to Ottawa with his family at age 14, attending Canterbury High School, and first became interested in competitive swimming when he joined the Greater Ottawa Kingfish Swim Club. In 2016, he was named to Canada's Olympic team for the 2016 Summer Olympics.
