= Tales Cerdeira =

Brazilian swimmer (born 1987)

Personal information
- Full name: Tales Rocha Cerdeira
- Nationality: Brazil
- Born: January 21, 1987 (age 39) Rio de Janeiro, Rio de Janeiro, Brazil
- Height: 1.82 m (6 ft 0 in)
- Weight: 72 kg (159 lb)

Sport
- Sport: Swimming
- Strokes: Breaststroke
Medal record
Men's swimming
Representing Brazil
South American Games
Silver medal – second place	2014 Santiago	200 m breaststroke

Tales Rocha Cerdeira (born January 21, 1987) is a Brazilian swimmer.

== International career ==
=== 2009–12 ===
At the 2009 World Aquatics Championships in Rome, finished 27th in the 200-metre breaststroke.

He was at the 2010 Pan Pacific Swimming Championships in Irvine, where he finished 4th in the 4×100-metre medley, 7th in the 100-metre breaststroke and was disqualified at the 200-metre breaststroke.

At the 2010 FINA World Swimming Championships (25 m) held in Dubai, Tales came in 9th place in the 200-metre breaststroke race.

In World Military Games conducted in 2010 in Warendorf, Germany, won the gold medal in the 50-metre, 100-metre, 200-metre breaststroke and 4×100-metre medley.

In 2011 he transferred to Flamengo, obtained the index to participate in 2011 World Aquatics Championships held in Shanghai (but withdrew from participating) and the 2011 Pan American Games.

At the 2011 Military World Games, got the gold medal in the 200-metre breaststroke and in the 4 × 100 m medley, and also won silver in the 100-metre breaststroke.

He joined the national delegation that disputed the 2011 Pan American Games, in Guadalajara, going to the final and finishing in 5th place in the 200-metre breaststroke.

=== 2012 Summer Olympics ===
At the 2012 Summer Olympics, he competed in the Men's 200-metre breaststroke, finishing in 14th place overall in the heats and 4th in his semifinal, narrowly missing a place in the final, finishing 9th.

=== 2013–16 ===
At the 2014 Pan Pacific Swimming Championships in Gold Coast, Queensland, Australia, he finished 5th in the 200-metre breaststroke, and 12th in the 100-metre breaststroke.

=== 2016 Summer Olympics ===
At the 2016 Summer Olympics, he competed in the Men's 200-metre breaststroke, finishing in 29th place overall in the heats.
