= Genaro Prono =

Paraguayan swimmer (born 1989)

Personal information
- Full name: Genaro Matias Prono Britez
- National team: Paraguay
- Born: 29 April 1989 (age 37) Asunción, Paraguay
- Height: 1.81 m (5 ft 11 in)
- Weight: 76 kg (168 lb)

Sport
- Sport: Swimming
- Strokes: Breaststroke
- Club: Pine Crest Swim Team (U.S.)
- College team: Auburn University (U.S.)

Genaro Matias Prono Britez (born April 29, 1989) is a Paraguayan swimmer, who specialized in breaststroke events. Prono is a member of the swimming team for Auburn Tigers, and a graduate of marketing at Auburn University in Auburn, Alabama. He is also a resident athlete of the Pine Crest Swim Team in Fort Lauderdale, Florida, where he trained with numerous world-class swimmers, including three-time Olympian Bradley Ally of Barbados, and freestyle specialist Daniele Tirabassi of Venezuela.

Prono qualified for the men's 100 m breaststroke at the 2008 Summer Olympics in Beijing, by clearing a FINA B-standard entry time of 1:03.35 from the Charlotte UltraSwim Prix in Charlotte, North Carolina. He challenged seven other swimmers on the third heat, including three-time Olympians Malick Fall from Senegal, and Alwin de Prins of Luxembourg. Prono edged out Fall to snatch a third spot by 0.19 of a second, breaking his personal best and Paraguayan record of 1:02.32. Prono failed to advance into the semifinals, as he placed forty-first out of 65 swimmers on the first night of the preliminaries.
