= Gerardo Huidobro =

Peruvian swimmer

Personal information
- Born: June 28, 1996 (age 30) Lima, Peru
- Height: 1.75 m (5 ft 9 in)

Sport
- Sport: Swimming
- College team: Albion College

Gerardo Huidobro Sigismondi (born 28 June 1996) is a Peruvian swimmer who has won several national and international medals at junior level. He has also participated in the 2013 FINA World Junior Swimming Championships in Dubai, United Arab Emirates, in 2013 and he has had several gold medals and records at the South American Junior Championships.

In 2015 he started his collegiate career at Albion College, and he has won several individual gold medals at the Michigan Intercollegiate Athletic Association.
