= Warren Barnes (swimmer) =

Canadian swimmer (born 1985)

Personal information
- Full name: Warren Barnes
- Nationality: Canada
- Born: May 6, 1985 (age 41) Scarborough, Ontario, Canada
- Height: 1.905 m (6 ft 3 in)

Sport
- Sport: Swimming
- Strokes: Breaststroke
- Club: Toronto Swim Club
- College team: Pittsburgh Panthers
Medal record
Men's swimming
Representing Canada
Summer Nationals (LC)
Gold medal – first place	Summer Nationals (LC)	50 m Breaststroke
World Championship Trials (LC)
Gold medal – first place	2011 Victoria	50 m Breaststroke
Bronze medal – third place	2011 Victoria	200 m Breaststroke
Gold medal – first place	2011 Victoria	200 m Individual Medley relay
Pan Pac Trials (LC)
Gold medal – first place	2010 Victoria	50 m Breaststroke
Gold medal – first place	2010 Victoria	100 m Breaststroke
Gold medal – first place	2010 Victoria	200 m Breaststroke
World Championship Trials (SC)
Bronze medal – third place	2009 Toronto	100 m Breaststroke

Warren Barnes (born May 6, 1985) is a former Canadian swimmer. He was a National Team Member, and University of Pittsburgh alumnus. He competed on the Canadian National Team from 2009-2012, and won the last race of his career at Canadian Nationals in 2013.

He is a five time National Champion in the breaststroke events. His first career win was in 2010, and he also set two Ontario records that year. His most notable accomplishment was his 4th-place finish at the Pan Am Games in Guadalajara, Mexico 2011. He was also named most valuable swimmer in Ontario in 2011, earning the Bob Pirie award. Warren now coaches Canada's next generation of swimmers at Region of Waterloo swim club (ROW swim club)

In 2014-15, he occasionally came into coach at Upper Canada College's Varsity Swim Team.
