= Jorge Murillo =

Colombian swimmer (born 1991)

Personal information
- Full name: Jorge Mario Murillo Valdes
- Nickname: 'Trucha'
- National team: Colombia
- Born: July 9, 1991 (age 35) Granada, Colombia
- Height: 1.87 m (6 ft 2 in)
- Weight: 85 kg (187 lb)

Sport
- Sport: Swimming
- Strokes: Breaststroke
- Club: TAC Titans
Medal record
Representing Colombia
Men's swimming
Event	1st	2nd	3rd
CAC Games	2	3	2
South American Games	3	5	2
South American Championships	7	5	8
Bolivarian Games	12	6	1
Total	24	19	13
Central American and Caribbean Games
Gold medal – first place	2014 Veracruz	50 m breaststroke
Gold medal – first place	2018 Barranquilla	100 m breaststroke
Silver medal – second place	2014 Veracruz	100 m breaststroke
Silver medal – second place	2014 Veracruz	4×100 m medley
Silver medal – second place	2018 Barranquilla	4×100 m mixed medley
Bronze medal – third place	2010 Mayagüez	4×100 m medley
Bronze medal – third place	2014 Veracruz	200 m breaststroke
South American Games
Gold medal – first place	2018 Cochabamba	100 m breaststroke
Gold medal – first place	2018 Cochabamba	200 m breaststroke
Gold medal – first place	2018 Cochabamba	4×100 m medley
Silver medal – second place	2010 Medellín	100 m breaststroke
Silver medal – second place	2010 Medellín	200 m breaststroke
Silver medal – second place	2022 Asunción	100 m breaststroke
Silver medal – second place	2022 Asunción	4×100 m medley
Silver medal – second place	2022 Asunción	4×100 m mixed medley
Bronze medal – third place	2010 Medellín	4×100 m medley
Bronze medal – third place	2022 Asunción	50 m breaststroke
South American Championships
Gold medal – first place	2012 Belém	200 m breaststroke
Gold medal – first place	2021 Buenos Aires	100 m breaststroke
Gold medal – first place	2021 Buenos Aires	200 m breaststroke
Gold medal – first place	2021 Buenos Aires	4×100 m medley
Gold medal – first place	2021 Buenos Aires	4×100 m mixed medley
Gold medal – first place	2024 Cali	50 m breaststroke
Gold medal – first place	2024 Cali	100 m breaststroke
Silver medal – second place	2018 Trujillo	100 m breaststroke
Silver medal – second place	2021 Buenos Aires	50 m breaststroke
Silver medal – second place	2024 Cali	200 m breaststroke
Silver medal – second place	2024 Cali	4×100 m medley
Silver medal – second place	2024 Cali	4×100 m mixed medley
Bronze medal – third place	2012 Belém	50 m breaststroke
Bronze medal – third place	2012 Belém	100 m breaststroke
Bronze medal – third place	2012 Belém	4×100 m medley
Bronze medal – third place	2016 Asunción	50 m breaststroke
Bronze medal – third place	2016 Asunción	100 m breaststroke
Bronze medal – third place	2018 Trujillo	50 m breaststroke
Bronze medal – third place	2018 Trujillo	4×100 m medley
Bronze medal – third place	2018 Trujillo	4×100 m mixed medley
Bolivarian Games
Gold medal – first place	2009 Sucre	100 m breaststroke
Gold medal – first place	2009 Sucre	200 m breaststroke
Gold medal – first place	2013 Trujillo	100 m breaststroke
Gold medal – first place	2013 Trujillo	200 m breaststroke
Gold medal – first place	2017 Santa Marta	100 m breaststroke
Gold medal – first place	2017 Santa Marta	4×100 m mixed medley
Gold medal – first place	2022 Valledupar	100 m breaststroke
Gold medal – first place	2022 Valledupar	200 m breaststroke
Gold medal – first place	2022 Valledupar	4×100 m medley
Gold medal – first place	2022 Valledupar	4×100 m mixed medley
Gold medal – first place	2025 Lima-Ayacucho	4×100 m medley
Gold medal – first place	2025 Lima-Ayacucho	4×100 m mixed medley
Silver medal – second place	2009 Sucre	50 m breaststroke
Silver medal – second place	2013 Trujillo	50 m breaststroke
Silver medal – second place	2013 Trujillo	4×100 m medley
Silver medal – second place	2017 Santa Marta	200 m breaststroke
Silver medal – second place	2017 Santa Marta	4×100 m medley
Silver medal – second place	2025 Lima-Ayacucho	100 m breaststroke
Bronze medal – third place	2025 Lima-Ayacucho	50 m breaststroke

Jorge Mario Murillo Valdes is a Colombian swimmer. He competed at the 2015 World Aquatics Championships and at the 2016 Summer Olympics in Rio de Janeiro. He competed at the 2020 Summer Olympics. Jorge also currently trains and coaches with the TAC Titans in North Carolina in the United States.
