= Carlos Claverie (swimmer) =

Venezuelan swimmer (born 1996)

Personal information
- Full name: Carlos Eduardo Claverie Borgiani
- Born: 19 September 1996 (age 29) Caracas, Republic of Venezuela
- Height: 1.9 m (6 ft 3 in)
- Weight: 68 kg (150 lb)

Sport
- Sport: Swimming
- Strokes: Breaststroke
- College team: University of Louisville
- Coach: Arthur Albiero (Louisville)
Medal record
Men's swimming
Representing Venezuela
Youth Olympic Games
Silver medal – second place	2014 Nanjing	50 m breaststroke
Silver medal – second place	2014 Nanjing	200 m breaststroke
Bronze medal – third place	2014 Nanjing	100 m breaststroke
Central American and Caribbean Games
Gold medal – first place	2014 Veracruz	100m breaststroke
Gold medal – first place	2014 Veracruz	200m breaststroke
Gold medal – first place	2014 Veracruz	400m individual medley
Gold medal – first place	2014 Veracruz	4x100m medley relay
South American Games
Silver medal – second place	2014 Santiago	100m breaststroke
Bronze medal – third place	2014 Santiago	200m breaststroke
Bronze medal – third place	2014 Santiago	200m individual medley
Bronze medal – third place	2014 Santiago	4x100m medley relay

Carlos Eduardo Claverie Borgiani (born 19 September 1996) is a Venezuelan swimmer. He won two silver and one bronze medal at the 2014 Summer Youth Olympics. He competed in the men's 100 metre breaststroke event at the 2016 Summer Olympics.

Claverie attended and swam for the University of Louisville under Head Coach Arthur Albiero.
