= Swimming at the 2015 Pan American Games =

- Swimming pictogram for the games
- Venue: CIBC Pan Am/Parapan Am Aquatics Centre and Field House
- Dates: July 14–18
- No. of events: 34 (17 men, 17 women)
- Competitors: 312 from 37 nations

Swimming competitions at the 2015 Pan American Games in Toronto were held from July 14 to 18 at the Toronto Pan Am Sports Centre (CIBC Pan Am/Parapan Am Aquatics Centre and Field House). Due to naming rights the arena was known as the latter for the duration of the games. Due to Pan American Games being scheduled to be held roughly around the same time as the 2015 World Aquatics Championships scheduled for Kazan, Russia, the swimming events were condensed into a five-day schedule.

== Format ==
The competition will feature 32 long course (50 m) events, divided evenly between males and females into the following 16 events:

- freestyle: 50, 100, 200, 400, 800 (females only) and 1500 (males only);
- backstroke: 100 and 200;
- breaststroke: 100 and 200;
- butterfly: 100 and 200;
- individual medley (I.M.): 200 and 400;
- relays: 4 × 100 free, 4 × 200 free and 4 × 100 medley.

There will also be two open water swim events (one each for men and women) over 10 km.

== Competition schedule ==
The following is the competition schedule for the swimming competitions:

H	Heats	F	Final

Men

Event↓/Date →	Sun 12	Tue 14		Wed 15		Thu 16		Fri 17		Sat 18	
50 m freestyle								H	F		
100 m freestyle		H	F								
200 m freestyle				H	F						
400 m freestyle								H	F		
1500 m freestyle										H	F
100 m backstroke								H	F		
200 m backstroke				H	F						
100 m breaststroke								H	F		
200 m breaststroke				H	F						
100 m butterfly						H	F				
200 m butterfly		H	F								
200 m individual medley										H	F
400 m individual medley						H	F				
4 × 100 m freestyle relay		H	F								
4 × 200 m freestyle relay				H	F						
4 × 100 m medley relay										H	F
10 km open water	F										

Women

Event↓/Date →	Sat 11	Tue 14		Wed 15		Thu 16		Fri 17		Sat 18	
50 m freestyle								H	F		
100 m freestyle		H	F								
200 m freestyle				H	F						
400 m freestyle								H	F		
800 m freestyle										H	F
100 m backstroke								H	F		
200 m backstroke				H	F						
100 m breaststroke								H	F		
200 m breaststroke				H	F						
100 m butterfly						H	F				
200 m butterfly		H	F								
200 m individual medley										H	F
400 m individual medley						H	F				
4 × 100 m freestyle relay		H	F								
4 × 200 m freestyle relay						H	F				
4 × 100 m medley relay										H	F
10 km open water	F										

== Medal summary ==
=== Medal standings ===
* Host nation (Canada)

Rank	Nation	Gold	Silver	Bronze	Total
1	United States	14	11	10	35
2	Brazil	10	6	10	26
3	Canada*	8	11	9	28
4	Argentina	1	2	0	3
5	Bahamas	1	0	1	2
6	Venezuela	0	2	1	3
7	Chile	0	1	0	1
7	Jamaica	0	1	0	1
9	Ecuador	0	0	2	2
10	Trinidad and Tobago	0	0	1	1
Totals (10 entries)		34	34	34	102

=== Men's events ===
Event	Gold		Silver		Bronze	
50 m freestyle	Josh Schneider; United States	21.86	Bruno Fratus; Brazil	21.91	George Bovell; Trinidad and Tobago	22.17
100 m freestyle	Federico Grabich; Argentina	48.26 NR	Santo Condorelli; Canada	48.57	Marcelo Chierighini; Brazil	48.80
200 m freestyle	João de Lucca; Brazil	1:46.42 GR, SA	Federico Grabich; Argentina	1:47.62 NR	Michael Weiss; United States	1:47.63
400 m freestyle	Ryan Cochrane; Canada	3:48.29 GR	Ryan Feeley; United States	3:49.69	Leonardo de Deus; Brazil	3:50.30
1500 m freestyle	Ryan Cochrane; Canada	15:06.40 GR	Andrew Gemmell; United States	15:09.92	Brandonn Almeida; Brazil	15:11.70 NR
100 m backstroke	Nick Thoman; United States	53.20 GR	Guilherme Guido; Brazil	53.35	Eugene Godsoe; United States	53.96
200 m backstroke	Sean Lehane; United States	1:57.47	Carter Griffin; United States	1:58.18	Leonardo de Deus; Brazil	1:58.27
100 m breaststroke	Felipe França; Brazil	59.21 GR	Felipe Lima; Brazil	1:00.01	Richard Funk; Canada	1:00.29
200 m breaststroke	Thiago Simon; Brazil	2:09.82 GR	Richard Funk; Canada	2:11.51	Thiago Pereira; Brazil	2:11.93
100 m butterfly	Giles Smith; United States	52.04 GR	Santiago Grassi; Argentina	52.09 NR	Santo Condorelli; Canada	52.42
200 m butterfly	Leonardo de Deus; Brazil	1:55.01 GR	Zack Chetrat; Canada	1:56.90 NR	Alec Page; Canada	1:58.01
200 m individual medley	Henrique Rodrigues; Brazil	1:57.06 GR	Thiago Pereira; Brazil	1:57.42	Joseph Bentz; United States	2:00.04
400 m individual medley	Brandonn Almeida; Brazil	4:14.47 WJR	Luke Reilly; Canada	4:16.16	Max Williamson; United States	4:16.91
4 × 100 m freestyle relay	Brazil; Matheus Santana; João de Lucca; Bruno Fratus; Marcelo Chierighini; Nicolas Oliveira * Thiago Pereira*	3:13.66 GR	Canada; Santo Condorelli; Karl Krug; Evan Van Moerkerke; Yuri Kisil; Markus Thormeyer*; Stefan Milošević*	3:14.32	United States; Josh Schneider; Darian Townsend; Cullen Jones; Michael Weiss; Michael Klueh*; Eugene Godsoe*	3:16.21
4 × 200 m freestyle relay	Brazil; Luiz Altamir Melo; João de Lucca; Thiago Pereira; Nicolas Oliveira; Henrique Rodrigues*; Kaio de Almeida*; Thiago Simon*	7:11.15 GR	United States; Michael Weiss; Michael Klueh; Joseph Bentz; Darian Townsend; Ryan Feeley*; Bobby Bollier*	7:12.20	Canada; Jeremy Bagshaw; Alec Page; Stefan Milošević; Ryan Cochrane; Yuri Kisil*; Coleman Allen*	7:17.33
4 × 100 m medley relay	Brazil; Guilherme Guido; Felipe França Silva; Arthur Mendes; Marcelo Chierighini; Thiago Pereira*; Felipe Lima*	3:32.68 GR	United States; Nick Thoman; Brad Craig; Gilles Smith; Josh Schneider; Eugene Godsoe*; Michael Weiss*	3:33.63	Canada; Russell Wood; Richard Funk; Santo Condorelli; Yuri Kisil; James Dergousoff*; Coleman Allen*	3:34.40
10 km marathon	Chip Peterson; United States	1:54:03.6	David Heron; United States	1:54:07.4	Esteban Enderica; Ecuador	1:54:09.2

* Swimmers who participated in the heats only and received medals.

=== Women's events ===
Event	Gold		Silver		Bronze	
50 m freestyle	Arianna Vanderpool-Wallace; Bahamas	24.38	Etiene Medeiros; Brazil	24.55 SA	Natalie Coughlin; United States	24.66
100 m freestyle	Chantal van Landeghem; Canada	53.83 GR	Natalie Coughlin; United States	54.06	Arianna Vanderpool-Wallace; Bahamas	54.15
200 m freestyle	Allison Schmitt; United States	1:56.23 GR	Emily Overholt; Canada	1:57.55	Manuella Lyrio; Brazil	1:58.03 SA
400 m freestyle	Emily Overholt; Canada	4:08.42 GR	Andreina Pinto; Venezuela	4:08.67	Gillian Ryan; United States	4:09.46
800 m freestyle	Sierra Schmidt; United States	8:27.54 GR	Kristel Köbrich; Chile	8:29.79	Andreina Pinto; Venezuela	8:31.08
100 m backstroke	Etiene Medeiros; Brazil	59.61 GR, SA	Olivia Smoliga; United States	1:00.06	Clara Smiddy; United States	1:00.49
200 m backstroke	Hilary Caldwell; Canada	2:08.22 GR	Dominique Bouchard; Canada	2:09.74	Clara Smiddy; United States	2:11.47
100 m breaststroke	Katie Meili; United States	1:06.26	Alia Atkinson; Jamaica	1:06.59	Rachel Nicol; Canada	1:07.91
200 m breaststroke	Kierra Smith; Canada	2:24.38 GR	Martha McCabe; Canada	2:24.51	Annie Lazor; United States	2:26.23
100 m butterfly	Kelsi Worrell; United States	57.78	Noemie Thomas; Canada	58.00	Katerine Savard; Canada	58.05
200 m butterfly	Audrey Lacroix; Canada	2:07.68	Katherine Mills; United States	2:09.31	Joanna Maranhão; Brazil	2:09.38 SA
200 m I.M.	Caitlin Leverenz; United States	2:10.51 GR	Meghan Small; United States	2:11.26	Sydney Pickrem; Canada	2:11.29
400 m I.M.	Caitlin Leverenz; United States	4:35.46 GR	Sydney Pickrem; Canada	4:38.03	Joanna Maranhão; Brazil	4:38.07 NR
4 × 100 m freestyle relay	Canada; Sandrine Mainville; Michele Williams; Katerine Savard; Chantal van Landeghem; Alyson Ackman*; Dominique Bouchard*	3:36.80 GR, NR	United States; Allison Schmitt; Amanda Weir; Madison Kennedy; Natalie Coughlin; Katie Meili*; Kelsi Worrell*	3:37.01	Brazil; Larissa Oliveira; Graciele Herrmann; Etiene Medeiros; Daynara de Paula; Daiane Oliveira*; Manuella Lyrio*	3:37.39 SA
4 × 200 m freestyle relay	United States; Kiera Janzen; Allison Schmitt; Courtney Harnish; Gillian Ryan; Amanda Weir*; Kylie Stewart*	7:54.32 GR	Brazil; Manuella Lyrio; Jéssica Cavalheiro; Joanna Maranhão; Larissa Oliveira; Bruna Primati*; Gabrielle Roncatto*	7:56.36 SA	Canada; Emily Overholt; Katerine Savard; Alyson Ackman; Brittany MacLean; Erika Seltenreich-Hodgson*; Tabitha Baumann*	7:59.36
4 × 100 m medley relay	United States; Natalie Coughlin; Katie Meili; Kelsi Worrell; Allison Schmitt	3:56.53 GR	Canada; Dominique Bouchard; Rachel Nicol; Noemie Thomas; Chantal van Landeghem; Tera van Beilen*; Sandrine Mainville*	3:58.51	Brazil; Etiene Medeiros; Jhennifer Conceição; Daynara de Paula; Larissa Oliveira; Natalia de Luccas*; Beatriz Travalon*	4:02.52
10 km marathon	Eva Fabian; United States	2:03:17.0	Paola Pérez Sierra; Venezuela	2:03:17.0	Samantha Arévalo; Ecuador	2:03:17.1

* Swimmers who swam in preliminary heats and received medals.

== Participating nations ==
A total of 37 countries qualified 312 swimmers. The number of athletes a nation entered is in parentheses beside the name of the country.

Pool

- Antigua and Barbuda (2)
- Argentina (20)
- Aruba (3)
- Bahamas (5)
- Barbados (3)
- Bermuda (2)
- Bolivia (2)
- Brazil (35)
- British Virgin Islands (1)
- Canada (36)
- Cayman Islands (2)
- Chile (4)
- Colombia (11)
- Costa Rica (2)
- Cuba (4)
- Ecuador (3)
- El Salvador (3)
- Grenada (2)
- Guatemala (4)
- Guyana (2)
- Haiti (1)
- Honduras (2)
- Jamaica (5)
- Mexico (26)
- Nicaragua (2)
- Panama (2)
- Paraguay (6)
- Peru (10)
- Puerto Rico (7)
- Saint Lucia (1)
- Saint Vincent and the Grenadines (2)
- Suriname (3)
- Trinidad and Tobago (2)
- United States (36)
- Uruguay (2)
- Venezuela (21)
- Virgin Islands (2)

Open water

- Argentina (4)
- Brazil (3)
- Canada (4)
- Chile (1)
- Costa Rica (3)
- Ecuador (2)
- El Salvador (1)
- Guatemala (4)
- Honduras (1)
- Mexico (4)
- Trinidad and Tobago (1)
- United States (4)
- Venezuela (4)

== Qualification ==
As with previous editions of the Games, A/B qualifying times will be used, with a target number of 276 swimmers. Times need to be swum in an approved meet sometime between January 1, 2014 and April 15, 2015. A total of 36 open water swimmers will also qualify (18 per gender).
