= Swimming at the 2015 Pan American Games – Men's 4 × 200 metre freestyle relay =

Men's 4 × 200 metre freestyle relay at the 2015 Pan American Games
- Venue: CIBC Pan Am/Parapan Am Aquatics Centre and Field House
- Dates: July 15 (preliminaries and finals)
- Competitors: 41 from 7 nations
- Winning time: 7:11.15

Medalists
Gold medal	Luiz Altamir Melo; João de Lucca; Thiago Pereira; Nicolas Oliveira; Henrique Rodrigues; Kaio de Almeida; Thiago Simon	Brazil
Silver medal	Michael Weiss; Michael Klueh; Joseph Bentz; Darian Townsend; Ryan Feeley; Bobby Bollier	United States
Bronze medal	Jeremy Bagshaw; Alec Page; Stefan Milošević; Ryan Cochrane; Yuri Kisil; Coleman Allen	Canada

The men's 4 × 200 metre freestyle relay competition of the swimming events at the 2015 Pan American Games took place on July 15 at the CIBC Pan Am/Parapan Am Aquatics Centre and Field House in Toronto, Canada. The defending Pan American Games champion is the United States.

This race consisted of sixteen lengths of the pool. Each of the four swimmers completed four lengths of the pool. The first swimmer had to touch the wall before the second could leave the starting block.

== Records ==
Prior to this competition, the existing world and Pan American Games records were as follows:

World record	United States (USA); Michael Phelps (1:44.49); Ricky Berens (1:44.13); David Walters (1:45.47); Ryan Lochte (1:44.46)	6:58.55	Rome, Italy	July 31, 2009
Pan American Games record	Brazil (BRA); Thiago Pereira (1:48.63); Rodrigo Castro (1:49.38); Lucas Salatta (1:47.63); Nicolas Oliveira (1:46.63)	7:12.27	Rio de Janeiro, Brazil	July 17, 2007

The following new records were set during this competition.

Date	Event	Nation	Time	Record
15 July	Final	Brazil; Luiz Altamir Melo (1:48.39); João de Lucca (1:47.79); Thiago Pereira (1:48.14); Nicolas Oliveira (1:46.83)	7:11.15	GR

== Schedule ==
All times are Eastern Time Zone (UTC-4).

Date	Time	Round
July 15, 2015	11:31	Heats
July 15, 2015	21:09	Final

== Results ==
=== Heats ===
The first round was held on July 15. As only seven teams had entered, the heats served as a ranking round with all seven teams advancing to the final.

Rank	Heat	Lane	Name	Nationality	Time	Notes
1	1	4	Joseph Bentz (1:49.85); Ryan Feeley (1:49.49); Bobby Bollier (1:50.82); Darian Townsend (1:49.02)	United States	7:19.18	Q
2	1	2	Stefan Milošević (1:49.84); Yuri Kisil (1:50.05); Ryan Cochrane (1:49.99); Coleman Allen (1:49.98)	Canada	7:19.86	Q
3	1	5	Luiz Altamir Melo (1:49.22); Henrique Rodrigues (1:49.43); Kaio de Almeida (1:52.23); Thiago Simon (1:58.54)	Brazil	7:29.42	Q
4	1	2	Andres Doria (1:51.15); Rafael D'Avila (1:52.05); Andy Arteta (1:53.62); Daniele Tirabassi (1:53.40)	Venezuela	7:30.22	Q
5	1	7	Julio Olvera (1:52.33); José Martínez (1:51.09); Arturo Pérez (1:54.44); Ricardo Vargas (1:52.48)	Mexico	7:30.34	Q
6	1	3	Lautaro Rodriguez (1:53.84); Esteban Paz (1:53.56); Juan Pereyra (1:56.76); Martín Naidich (1:55.14)	Argentina	7:39.30	Q
7	1	1	Nicholas Magana (1:55.53); Gerardo Huidobro (2:10.25); Jean Pierre Monteagudo (2:01.19); Gustavo Gutierrez (1:58.49)	Peru	8:05.46	Q

=== Final ===
The final was held on July 15.

Rank	Lane	Name	Nationality	Time	Notes
1st place, gold medalist(s)	3	Luiz Altamir Melo (1:48.39); João de Lucca (1:47.79); Thiago Pereira (1:48.14); Nicolas Oliveira (1:46.83)	Brazil	7:11.15	GR
2nd place, silver medalist(s)	4	Michael Weiss (1:48.49); Michael Klueh (1:48.26); Joseph Bentz (1:47.90); Darian Townsend (1:47.55)	United States	7:12.20	
3rd place, bronze medalist(s)	5	Jeremy Bagshaw (1:49.56); Alec Page (1:49.20); Stefan Milošević (1:49.33); Ryan Cochrane (1:49.24)	Canada	7:17.33	
4	6	Daniele Tirabassi (1:51.75); Marcos Lavado (1:50.04); Andres Doria (1:50.39); Cristian Quintero (1:48.96)	Venezuela	7:21.14	
5	2	Long Yuan Gutierrez (1:48.87) NR; Luis Campos (1:51.15); José Martínez (1:50.85); Julio Olvera (1:51.25)	Mexico	7:22.12	NR
6	7	Federico Grabich (1:48.34); Juan Pereyra (1:51.80); Guido Buscaglia (1:52.15); Martín Naidich (1:50.53)	Argentina	7:22.82	NR
