= Swimming at the 2015 Pan American Games – Men's 200 metre butterfly =

Men's 200 metre butterfly at the 2015 Pan American Games
- Venue: CIBC Pan Am/Parapan Am Aquatics Centre and Field House
- Dates: July 14 (preliminaries and finals)
- Competitors: 17 from 10 nations

Medalists
Gold medal	Leonardo de Deus	Brazil
Silver medal	Zack Chetrat	Canada
Bronze medal	Alec Page	Canada

The men's 200-metre butterfly competition of the swimming events at the 2015 Pan American Games took place on July 14 at the CIBC Pan Am/Parapan Am Aquatics Centre and Field House in Toronto, Canada. The defending Pan American Games champion was Leonardo de Deus of Brazil.

This race consisted of four lengths of the pool, all swum in the butterfly stroke. The top eight swimmers from the heats would qualified for the A final (where the medals were awarded), while the next best eight swimmers advanced to the B final.

On July 16, it was reported that Mauricio Fiol of Peru tested positive for stanozolol with the likely to be stripped of his medal. On July 23 the PASO issued a press release indicating that Fiol was disqualified and had to forfeit his medal.

== Records ==
Prior to this competition, the existing world and Pan American Games records were as follows:

World record	Michael Phelps (USA)	1:51.51	Rome, Italy	July 29, 2009
Pan American Games record	Kaio de Almeida (BRA)	1:55.45	Rio de Janeiro, Brazil	July 21, 2007

The following new records were set during this competition.

Date	Event	Name	Nationality	Time	Record
14 July	A Final	Leonardo de Deus	Brazil	1:55.01	GR

== Qualification ==
Each National Olympic Committee (NOC) was able to enter up to two athletes, provided they met the A standard (2:01.39) during the qualifying period (January 1, 2014 to May 1, 2015). NOCs were also permitted to enter one athlete, provided they met the B standard (2:08.67) during the same qualifying period. All other competing athletes qualified through universality spots.

== Results ==
KEY:	q	Fastest non-qualifiers	Q	Qualified	GR	Games record	NR	National record	PB	Personal best	SB	Seasonal best

=== Heats ===
The first round was held on July 14.

Rank	Heat	Lane	Name	Nationality	Time	Notes
1	2	6	~~Mauricio Fiol~~	~~Peru~~	~~1:56.81~~	~~QA, NR~~
2	3	4	Leonardo de Deus	Brazil	1:58.44	QA
3	1	4	Bobby Bollier	United States	1:58.61	QA
4	3	5	Alec Page	Canada	1:58.82	QA
5	3	3	Marcos Lavado	Venezuela	1:59.08	QA
6	2	4	Kaio de Almeida	Brazil	1:59.24	QA
7	1	5	Zack Chetrat	Canada	1:59.39	QA
8	2	5	Andrew Torres	Puerto Rico	1:59.83	QA
9	3	6	Long Yuan Gutierrez	Mexico	2:00.30	QB
10	1	6	Esnaider Reales	Colombia	2:01.19	QB
11	2	3	Andres Montoya	Colombia	2:01.73	QB
12	2	2	Lazaro Vergara	Cuba	2:02.43	QB
13	1	3	Ty Stewart	United States	2:02.68	QB
14	3	2	Jose Martinez	Mexico	2:03.15	QB
15	1	2	Maximiliano Abreu	Paraguay	2:05.61	QB
16	2	7	Matthew Mays	Virgin Islands	2:07.90	QB
17	3	7	Aldo Castillo	Bolivia	2:12.77	

=== B Final ===
The B final was also held on July 14.

Rank	Lane	Name	Nationality	Time	Notes
9	4	Long Yuan Gutierrez	Mexico	2:00.09	
10	5	Esnaider Reales	Colombia	2:00.79	
11	3	Andres Montoya	Colombia	2:00.93	
12	6	Lazaro Vergara	Cuba	2:02.30	
13	7	Jose Martinez	Mexico	2:02.39	
14	2	Ty Stewart	United States	2:02.59	
15	1	Maximiliano Abreu	Paraguay	2:06.91	
16	8	Matthew Mays	Virgin Islands	2:09.74	

=== A Final ===
The A final was also held on July 14.

Rank	Lane	Name	Nationality	Time	Notes
1st place, gold medalist(s)	5	Leonardo de Deus	Brazil	1:55.01	GR
2nd place, silver medalist(s)	1	Zack Chetrat	Canada	1:56.90	NR
3rd place, bronze medalist(s)	6	Alec Page	Canada	1:58.01	
4	7	Kaio de Almeida	Brazil	1:58.51	
5	8	Andrew Torres	Puerto Rico	1:59.37	
6	2	Marcos Lavado	Venezuela	1:59.59	
7	3	Bobby Bollier	United States	1:59.89	
DQ	4	~~Mauricio Fiol~~	~~Peru~~	~~1:55.15~~	~~NR~~
