= Swimming at the 2015 Pan American Games – Men's 200 metre freestyle =

Men's 200 metre freestyle at the 2015 Pan American Games
- Venue: CIBC Pan Am/Parapan Am Aquatics Centre and Field House
- Dates: July 15 (preliminaries and finals)
- Competitors: 21 from 15 nations
- Winning time: 1:46.42

Medalists
Gold medal	João de Lucca	Brazil
Silver medal	Federico Grabich	Argentina
Bronze medal	Michael Weiss	United States

The men's 200 metre freestyle competition of the swimming events at the 2015 Pan American Games took place on July 15 at the CIBC Pan Am/Parapan Am Aquatics Centre and Field House in Toronto, Canada. The defending Pan American Games champion was Brett Fraser of the Cayman Islands.

This race consisted of four lengths of the pool, all lengths in freestyle. The top eight swimmers from the heats would qualify for the A final (where the medals would be awarded), while the next best eight swimmers would qualify for the B final.

== Records ==
Prior to this competition, the existing world and Pan American Games records were as follows:

World record	Paul Biedermann (GER)	1:42.00	Rome, Italy	July 28, 2009
Pan American Games record	Brett Fraser (CAY)	1.47.18	Guadalajara, Mexico	October 18, 2011

The following new records were set during this competition.

Date	Event	Name	Nationality	Time	Record
15 July	A Final	João de Lucca	Brazil	1:46.42	GR

== Qualification ==
Each National Olympic Committee (NOC) was able to enter up to two entrants providing they had met the A standard (1:51.49) in the qualifying period (January 1, 2014 to May 1, 2015). NOCs were also permitted to enter one athlete providing they had met the B standard (1:58.18) in the same qualifying period. All other competing athletes were entered as universality spots.

== Schedule ==
All times are Eastern Time Zone (UTC-4).

Date	Time	Round
July 15, 2015	10:20	Heats
July 15, 2015	19:17	Final B
July 15, 2015	19:23	Final A

== Results ==
KEY:	q	Fastest non-qualifiers	Q	Qualified	GR	Games record	NR	National record	PB	Personal best	SB	Seasonal best

=== Heats ===
The first round was held on July 15.

Rank	Heat	Lane	Name	Nationality	Time	Notes
1	2	3	Cristian Quintero	Venezuela	1:48.42	QA
2	3	5	Michael Weiss	United States	1:48.55	QA
3	1	4	Federico Grabich	Argentina	1:48.61	QA
4	1	5	Michael Klueh	United States	1:48.67	QA
5	2	4	Jeremy Bagshaw	Canada	1:48.76	QA
6	2	5	João de Lucca	Brazil	1:48.78	QA
7	3	4	Nicolas Oliveira	Brazil	1:49.51	QA
8	3	3	Benjamin Hockin	Paraguay	1:49.59	QA
9	2	6	Marcos Lavado	Venezuela	1:49.91	QB
10	3	2	Luis Campos	Mexico	1:50.24	QB
11	1	3	Alec Page	Canada	1:50.34	QB
12	2	2	Mateo de Angulo	Colombia	1:50.50	QB
13	3	7	Tomas Peribonio	Ecuador	1:51.61	QB
14	1	2	Marcelo Acosta	El Salvador	1:51.77	QB
15	1	7	Luis Martínez	Guatemala	1:51.79	QB
16	3	6	Guido Buscaglia	Argentina	1:52.95	QB
17	2	7	Alex Sobers	Barbados	1:53.11	
18	1	6	Long Yuan Gutierrez	Mexico	1:54.46	
19	3	1	Noah Mascoll-Gomes	Antigua and Barbuda	1:55.56	
20	2	1	Miguel Mena	Nicaragua	1:58.51	
21	1	1	Omar Adams	Guyana	2:15.58	

=== B Final ===
The B final was also held on July 15.

Rank	Lane	Name	Nationality	Time	Notes
9	3	Alec Page	Canada	1:49.86	
10	6	Mateo de Angulo	Colombia	1:50.01	
11	7	Marcelo Acosta	El Salvador	1:50.95	
12	2	Tomas Peribonio	Ecuador	1:50.98	
13	4	Marcos Lavado	Venezuela	1:51.08	
14	5	Luis Campos	Mexico	1:51.37	
15	8	Alex Sobers	Barbados	1:53.16	
16	1	Luis Martínez	Guatemala	1:53.39	

=== A Final ===
The A final was also held on July 15.

Rank	Lane	Name	Nationality	Time	Notes
1st place, gold medalist(s)	7	João de Lucca	Brazil	1:46.42	GR, SA
2nd place, silver medalist(s)	3	Federico Grabich	Argentina	1:47.62	NR
3rd place, bronze medalist(s)	5	Michael Weiss	United States	1:47.63	
4	6	Michael Klueh	United States	1:47.73	
5	1	Nicolas Oliveira	Brazil	1:47.81	
6	4	Cristian Quintero	Venezuela	1:47.88	NR
7	2	Jeremy Bagshaw	Canada	1:47.92	
8	8	Benjamin Hockin	Paraguay	1:50.03	
