= Swimming at the 2015 Pan American Games – Men's 4 × 100 metre medley relay =

Men's 4 × 100 metre medley relay at the 2015 Pan American Games
- Venue: CIBC Pan Am/Parapan Am Aquatics Centre and Field House
- Dates: July 18 (preliminaries and finals)
- Competitors: 49 from 9 nations
- Winning time: 3:32.68

Medalists
| Gold medal | Guilherme Guido, Felipe França Silva, Arthur Mendes, Marcelo Chierighini, Thiago Pereira, Felipe Lima | Brazil |
| Silver medal | Nick Thoman, Brad Craig, Gilles Smith, Josh Schneider, Eugene Godsoe, Michael Weiss | United States |
| Bronze medal | Russell Wood, Richard Funk, Santo Condorelli, Yuri Kisil, James Dergousoff, Coleman Allen | Canada |

The men's 4 × 100 metre medley relay competition of the swimming events at the 2015 Pan American Games took place on July 18 at the CIBC Pan Am/Parapan Am Aquatics Centre and Field House in Toronto, Canada. The defending Pan American Games champion is Brazil.

This race consisted of eight lengths of the pool. Each of the four swimmers completed two lengths of the pool. The order of swimming styles is: Backstroke, Breaststroke, Butterfly and Freestyle. The first swimmer had to touch the wall before the second could leave the starting block.

== Records ==
Prior to this competition, the existing world and Pan American Games records were as follows:

| World record | United States (USA); Aaron Peirsol (52.19); Eric Shanteau (58.57); Michael Phelps (49.72); David Walters (46.80) | 3:27.28 | Rome, Italy | August 2, 2009 |
| Pan American Games record | United States (USA); Randall Bal (53.83); Mark Gangloff (59.54); Ricky Berens (52.25); Andy Grant (48.75) | 3:34.37 | Rio de Janeiro, Brazil | July 22, 2007 |

The following new records were set during this competition.

| Date | Event | Nation | Time | Record |
|---|---|---|---|---|
| 18 July | Final | Brazil | 3:32.68 | GR |

== Schedule ==
All times are Eastern Time Zone (UTC-4).

| Date | Time | Round |
|---|---|---|
| July 18, 2015 | 11:37 | Heats |
| July 18, 2015 | 20:46 | Final |

== Results ==
=== Heats ===
The first round was held on July 18.

| Rank | Heat | Lane | Name | Nationality | Time | Notes |
|---|---|---|---|---|---|---|
| 1 | 2 | 4 | Nick Thoman (55.06); Brad Craig (1:01.35); Eugene Godsoe (52.76); Michael Weiss (49.82) | United States | 3:38.99 | Q |
| 2 | 2 | 5 | Russell Wood (55.22); James Dergousoff (1:02.27); Coleman Allen (52.77); Yuri Kisil (48.83) | Canada | 3:39.09 | Q |
| 3 | 1 | 4 | Thiago Pereira (58.40); Felipe Lima (59.83); Arthur Mendes (52.38); Marcelo Chierighini (52.22) | Brazil | 3:42.83 | Q |
| 4 | 2 | 3 | Agustín Hernández (57.37); Rodrigo Frutos (1:03.30); Santiago Grassi (52.89); Matías Aguilera (50.61) | Argentina | 3:44.17 | Q |
| 5 | 2 | 6 | Andy Song An (57.91); Miguel Chavez (1:03.37); Long Yuan Gutierrez (53.14); Luis Campos (51.18) | Mexico | 3:45.60 | Q |
| 6 | 2 | 2 | Omar Pinzón (57.32); Jorge Murillo (1:01.52); Esnaider Reales (54.57); Carlos Mahecha (52.61) | Colombia | 3:46.02 | Q |
| 7 | 1 | 5 | Robinson Molina (57.80); Carlos Claverie (1:02.26); Marcos Lavado (55.13); Daniele Tirabassi (51.72) | Venezuela | 3:46.91 | Q |
| 8 | 1 | 6 | Charles Hockin (58.37); Renato Prono (1:03.99); Max Abreu (55.78); Benjamin Hockin (49.58) | Paraguay | 3:47.72 | Q |
| 9 | 1 | 3 | Gustavo Gutiérrez (1:07.68); Gerardo Huidobro (1:07.50); Jean Pierre Monteagudo (57.65); Nicholas Magana (51.23) | Peru | 4:04.06 | |

=== Final ===
The final was held on July 18.

| Rank | Lane | Name | Nationality | Time | Notes |
|---|---|---|---|---|---|
| 1st place, gold medalist(s) | 3 | Guilherme Guido (53.12 GR, SA); Felipe França Silva (59.81); Arthur Mendes (52.14); Marcelo Chierighini (47.61) | Brazil | 3:32.68 | GR |
| 2nd place, silver medalist(s) | 4 | Nick Thoman (53.40); Brad Craig (1:00.37); Giles Smith (51.85); Josh Schneider (48.01) | United States | 3:33.63 | |
| 3rd place, bronze medalist(s) | 5 | Russell Wood (54.58); Richard Funk (59.32); Santo Condorelli (52.20); Yuri Kisil (48.30) | Canada | 3:34.40 | |
| 4 | 6 | Federico Grabich (55.05); Facundo Miguelena (1:02.39); Santiago Grassi (51.84); Matías Aguilera (49.89) | Argentina | 3:39.17 | NR |
| 5 | 7 | Omar Pinzón (55.07); Jorge Murillo (1:00.36); Esnaider Reales (54.15); Mateo de Angulo (51.21) | Colombia | 3:40.79 | NR |
| 6 | 1 | Robinson Molina (57.42); Carlos Claverie (1:02.21); Albert Subirats (52.16); Cristian Quintero (49.06) | Venezuela | 3:40.85 | NR |
| 7 | 2 | Daniel Torres (57.48); Miguel de Lara (1:00.99); Long Yuan Gutierrez (53.34); Luis Campos (50.96) | Mexico | 3:42.77 | NR |
| 8 | 8 | Matías López (56.76); Renato Prono (1:03.80); Benjamin Hockin (53.51); Charles Hockin (51.30) | Paraguay | 3:45.37 | |
