= Swimming at the 2015 Pan American Games – Men's 4 × 100 metre freestyle relay =

Men's 4 × 100 metre freestyle relay at the 2015 Pan American Games
- Venue: CIBC Pan Am/Parapan Am Aquatics Centre and Field House
- Dates: July 14 (preliminaries and finals)
- Competitors: 37 from 7 nations
- Winning time: 3:13.66

Medalists
Gold medal	Matheus Santana, João de Lucca, Bruno Fratus, Marcelo Chierighini, Nicolas Oliveira, Thiago Pereira	Brazil
Silver medal	Santo Condorelli, Karl Krug, Evan van Moerkerke, Yuri Kisil, Markus Thormeyer, Stefan Milošević	Canada
Bronze medal	Josh Schneider, Darian Townsend, Cullen Jones, Michael Weiss, Michael Klueh, Eugene Godsoe	United States

The men's 4 × 100 metre freestyle relay competition of the swimming events at the 2015 Pan American Games took place on July 14 at the CIBC Pan Am/Parapan Am Aquatics Centre and Field House in Toronto, Canada. The defending Pan American Games champion is Brazil.

This race consisted of eight lengths of the pool. Each of the four swimmers completed two lengths of the pool. The first swimmer had to touch the wall before the second could leave the starting block.

== Records ==
Prior to this competition, the existing world and Pan American Games records were as follows:

World record	United States (USA); Michael Phelps (47.51); Garrett Weber-Gale (47.02); Cullen Jones (47.65); Jason Lezak (46.06)	3:08.24	Beijing, China	August 11, 2008
Pan American Games record	Brazil (BRA); Bruno Fratus (49.36); Nicholas Santos (48.92); César Cielo (47.07); Nicolas Oliveira (49.30)	3:14.65	Guadalajara, Mexico	October 16, 2011

The following new records were set during this competition.

Date	Event	Nation	Time	Record
14 July	Final	Brazil	3:13.66	GR

== Schedule ==
All times are Eastern Time Zone (UTC-4).

Date	Time	Round
July 14, 2015	11:10	Heats
July 14, 2015	20:31	Final

== Results ==
=== Heats ===
The first round was held on July 14. As only seven teams had entered, the heats served as a ranking round with all seven teams advancing to the final.

Rank	Heat	Lane	Name	Nationality	Time	Notes
1	1	5	João de Lucca (49.04); Nicolas Oliveira (48.78); Thiago Pereira (50.25); Bruno Fratus (49.80)	Brazil	3:17.87	Q
2	1	3	Markus Thormeyer (49.82); Karl Krug (49.37); Evan van Moerkerke (49.64); Stefan Milošević (49.94)	Canada	3:18.77	Q
3	1	4	Josh Schneider (49.82); Michael Klueh (49.67); Eugene Godsoe (50.12); Michael Weiss (49.33)	United States	3:18.94	Q
4	1	6	Guido Buscaglia (50.96); Matias Aguilera (50.57); Lautaro Rodriguez (50.66); Federico Grabich (50.81)	Argentina	3:23.00	Q
5	1	2	Jesus Lopez (50.93); Carlos Omaña (51.71); Robinson Molina (51.59); Andres Doria (50.58)	Venezuela	3:24.81	Q
6	1	1	Charles Hockin (52.11); Matías López (54.10); Max Abreu (55.72); Ben Hockin (54.59)	Paraguay	3:36.52	Q
7	1	7	Nicholas Magana (51.11); Gustavo Gutierrez (55.93); Gerardo Huidobro (54.72); Jean Pierre Monteagudo (55.21)	Peru	3:36.97	Q

=== Final ===
The final was held on July 14.

Rank	Lane	Name	Nationality	Time	Notes
1st place, gold medalist(s)	4	Matheus Santana (49.28); João de Lucca (48.06); Bruno Fratus (48.56); Marcelo Chierighini (47.76)	Brazil	3:13.66	GR
2nd place, silver medalist(s)	5	Santo Condorelli (47.98); Karl Krug (49.14); Evan van Moerkerke (49.04); Yuri Kisil (48.16)	Canada	3:14.32	
3rd place, bronze medalist(s)	3	Josh Schneider (49.44); Darian Townsend (49.37); Cullen Jones (48.86); Michael Weiss (48.54)	United States	3:16.21	
4	6	Federico Grabich (48.11 NR); Matías Aguilera (49.79); Lautaro Rodríguez (49.72); Guido Buscaglia (49.79)	Argentina	3:17.41	NR
5	2	Albert Subirats (49.39); Daniele Tirabassi (49.95); Jesus Lopez (50.55); Cristian Quintero (48.99)	Venezuela	3:18.88	
6	7	Charles Hockin (50.67); Matías López (52.74); Max Abreu (52.40); Ben Hockin (51.79)	Paraguay	3:27.60	
7	1	Nicholas Magana (51.31); Gerardo Huidobro (55.20); Jean Pierre Monteagudo (55.42); Gustavo Gutierrez (55.48)	Peru	3:37.41	
