= Swimming at the 2015 Pan American Games – Men's 400 metre individual medley =

Men's 400 metre individual medley at the 2015 Pan American Games
- Venue: CIBC Pan Am/Parapan Am Aquatics Centre and Field House
- Dates: July 16, 2015 (preliminaries and finals)
- Competitors: 20 from 15 nations
- Winning time: 4:14.47

Medalists
Gold medal	Brandonn Almeida	Brazil
Silver medal	Luke Reilly	Canada
Bronze medal	Max Williamson	United States

The men's 400 metre individual medley competition of the swimming events at the 2015 Pan American Games took place on July 16, 2015 at the CIBC Pan Am/Parapan Am Aquatics Centre and Field House in Toronto, Canada. The defending Pan American Games champion was Thiago Pereira of Brazil.

This race consisted of eight lengths of the pool. The first two lengths were swum using the butterfly stroke, the second pair with the backstroke, the third pair of lengths in breaststroke, and the final two were freestyle. The top eight swimmers from the heats would qualify for the A final (where the medals would be awarded), while the next eight swimmers would qualify for the B final.

== Records ==
Prior to this competition, the existing world and Pan American Games records were as follows:

World record	Michael Phelps (USA)	4:03.84	Beijing, China	August 10, 2008
Pan American Games record	Thiago Pereira (BRA)	4:11.14	Rio de Janeiro, Brazil	July 17, 2007

== Qualification ==
Each National Olympic Committee (NOC) was able to enter up to two entrants providing they had met the A standard (4:35.99) in the qualifying period (January 1, 2014 to May 1, 2015). NOCs were also permitted to enter one athlete providing they had met the B standard (4:52.55) in the same qualifying period. All other competing athletes were entered as universality spots.

== Schedule ==
All times are Eastern Time Zone (UTC-4).

Date	Time	Round
July 16, 2015	10:23	Heats
July 16, 2015	19:31	Final B
July 16, 2015	19:40	Final A

== Results ==
KEY:	q	Fastest non-qualifiers	Q	Qualified	GR	Games record	NR	National record	PB	Personal best	SB	Seasonal best

=== Heats ===
The first round was held on July 16.

Rank	Heat	Lane	Name	Nationality	Time	Notes
1	2	5	Max Williamson	United States	4:17.92	QA
2	2	4	Michael Weiss	United States	4:17.96	QA
3	3	5	Luke Reilly	Canada	4:19.44	QA
4	3	4	Thiago Pereira	Brazil	4:19.92	QA
5	1	4	Brandonn Almeida	Brazil	4:20.59	QA
6	3	3	Carlos Omaña	Venezuela	4:20.84	QA
7	2	3	Tomas Peribonio	Ecuador	4:21.07	QA
8	1	5	Alec Page	Canada	4:21.46	QA
9	1	3	Juan Sequera	Venezuela	4:25.69	QB
10	1	6	Esteban Paz	Argentina	4:27.37	QB
11	3	6	Juan Del Pino	Mexico	4:28.37	QB
12	2	6	Christian Bayo	Puerto Rico	4:28.54	QB
13	1	2	Rafael Alfaro	El Salvador	4:29.81	QB
14	2	7	Matías López	Paraguay	4:30.27	QB, NR
15	3	1	Esteban Araya	Costa Rica	4:31.52	QB
16	3	2	Luis Vega	Cuba	4:32.86	QB
17	2	1	Felipe Quiroz	Chile	4:36.65	
18	3	7	Jean Pierre Monteagudo	Peru	4:38.75	
19	1	1	Aldo Castillo Sulca	Bolivia	4:58.57	
	2	2	Julio Olvera	Mexico		DSQ
	1	7	Yeziel Morales	Puerto Rico		DNS

=== B Final ===
The B final was also held on July 16.

Rank	Lane	Name	Nationality	Time	Notes
9	4	Juan Sequera	Venezuela	4:24.97	
10	3	Juan Del Pino	Mexico	4:26.29	
11	5	Esteban Paz	Argentina	4:26.83	NR
12	6	Christian Bayo	Puerto Rico	4:27.15	NR
13	2	Rafael Alfaro	El Salvador	4:27.40	
14	7	Matías López	Paraguay	4:27.47	NR
15	8	Luis Vega	Cuba	4:28.18	
16	1	Esteban Araya	Costa Rica	4:33.80	

=== A Final ===
The A final was also held on July 16. Thiago Pereira initially won, which would make it his third consecutive title along with a record 22nd Pan American medal. However, the judges dictated Pereira failed to touch the wall with both hands at the same time on one of his breaststroke turns as predicted by the rulebook.

Rank	Lane	Name	Nationality	Time	Notes
1st place, gold medalist(s)	2	Brandonn Almeida	Brazil	4:14.47	WJR
2nd place, silver medalist(s)	3	Luke Reilly	Canada	4:16.16	
3rd place, bronze medalist(s)	4	Max Williamson	United States	4:16.91	
4	5	Michael Weiss	United States	4:17.05	
5	8	Alec Page	Canada	4:18.61	
6	7	Carlos Omaña	Venezuela	4:19.11	NR
7	1	Tomas Peribonio	Ecuador	4:22.67	
	6	Thiago Pereira	Brazil		DSQ
