= Swimming at the 2015 Pan American Games – Women's 400 metre freestyle =

Women's 400 metre freestyle at the 2015 Pan American Games
- Venue: CIBC Pan Am/Parapan Am Aquatics Centre and Field House
- Dates: July 17 (preliminaries and finals)
- Competitors: 17 from 12 nations
- Winning time: 4:08.42

Medalists
Gold medal	Emily Overholt	Canada
Silver medal	Andreina Pinto	Venezuela
Bronze medal	Gillian Ryan	United States

The women's 400 metre freestyle competition of the swimming events at the 2015 Pan American Games took place on July 17 at the CIBC Pan Am/Parapan Am Aquatics Centre and Field House in Toronto, Canada. The defending Pan American Games champion was Gillian Ryan of the United States.

This race consisted of eight lengths of the pool in freestyle. The top eight swimmers from the heats would qualify for the A final (where the medals would be awarded), while the next best eight swimmers would qualify for the B final.

== Records ==
Prior to this competition, the existing world and Pan American Games records were as follows:

World record	Katie Ledecky (USA)	3:58.37	Gold Coast, Australia	August 23, 2014
Pan American Games record	Elizabeth Hill (USA)	4:10.48	Santo Domingo, Dominican Republic	August 13, 2003

The following new records were set during this competition.

Date	Event	Name	Nationality	Time	Record
17 July	A Final	Emily Overholt	Canada	4:08.42	GR

== Qualification ==
Each National Olympic Committee (NOC) was able to enter up to two entrants providing they had met the A standard (4:17.99) in the qualifying period (January 1, 2014 to May 1, 2015). NOCs were also permitted to enter one athlete providing they had met the B standard (4:33.47) in the same qualifying period. All other competing athletes were entered as universality spots.

== Schedule ==
All times are Eastern Time Zone (UTC-4).

Date	Time	Round
July 17, 2015	10:29	Heats
July 17, 2015	19:43	Final B
July 17, 2015	19:52	Final A

== Results ==
KEY:	q	Fastest non-qualifiers	Q	Qualified	GR	Games record	NR	National record	PB	Personal best	SB	Seasonal best

=== Heats ===
The first round was held on July 17.

Rank	Heat	Lane	Name	Nationality	Time	Notes
1	3	5	Kiera Janzen	United States	4:11.82	QA
2	3	4	Andreina Pinto	Venezuela	4:12.43	QA
3	3	3	Manuella Lyrio	Brazil	4:15.38	QA
4	1	5	Joanna Evans	Bahamas	4:15.51	QA
5	2	4	Gillian Ryan	United States	4:15.95	QA
6	3	2	María Álvarez	Colombia	4:16.90	QA
7	2	3	Carolina Bilich	Brazil	4:16.92	QA
8	1	4	Emily Overholt	Canada	4:18.21	QA
9	1	3	Natalia Jaspeado	Mexico	4:18.30	QB
10	2	5	Tabitha Baumann	Canada	4:18.70	QB
11	3	6	Allyson Macias	Mexico	4:20.45	QB
12	2	2	Elisbet Gamez	Cuba	4:21.10	QB
13	2	6	Andrea Cedrón	Peru	4:21.31	QB
14	1	6	Gabriela Santis	Guatemala	4:24.73	QB
15	3	7	Daniella van den Berg	Aruba	4:28.01	QB
16	2	7	Rebeca Quinteros	El Salvador	4:29.19	QB
17	1	2	Lani Cabrera	Bahamas	4:29.46	

=== B Final ===
The B final was also held on July 17.

Rank	Lane	Name	Nationality	Time	Notes
9	5	Tabitha Baumann	Canada	4:16.03	
10	7	Gabriela Santis	Guatemala	4:16.79	
11	4	Natalia Jaspeado	Mexico	4:17.25	
12	3	Allyson Macias	Mexico	4:17.49	
13	6	Elisbet Gamez	Cuba	4:18.23	
14	2	Andrea Cedrón	Peru	4:23.93	
15	8	Rebeca Quinteros	El Salvador	4:27.89	
16	1	Daniella van den Berg	Aruba	4:30.14	

=== A Final ===
The A final was also held on July 17.

Rank	Lane	Name	Nationality	Time	Notes
1st place, gold medalist(s)	8	Emily Overholt	Canada	4:08.42	GR
2nd place, silver medalist(s)	5	Andreina Pinto	Venezuela	4:08.67	
3rd place, bronze medalist(s)	2	Gillian Ryan	United States	4:09.46	
4	3	Manuella Lyrio	Brazil	4:10.92	NR
5	4	Kiera Janzen	United States	4:11.32	
6	6	Joanna Evans	Bahamas	4:14.51	
7	1	Carolina Bilich	Brazil	4:17.40	
8	7	María Álvarez	Colombia	4:17.80	
