= Swimming at the 2011 Pan American Games – Women's 400 metre freestyle =

Women's 400 metre freestyle at the 2011 Pan American Games
- Venue: Scotiabank Aquatics Center
- Dates: October 17 (preliminaries and finals)

Medalists
Gold medal	Gillian Ryan	United States
Silver medal	Andreina Pinto	Venezuela
Bronze medal	Kristel Kobrich	Chile

The women's 400 metre freestyle competition of the swimming events at the 2011 Pan American Games took place on October 17 at the Scotiabank Aquatics Center in the municipality of Zapopan, near Guadalajara, Mexico. The defending Pan American Games champion was Jessica Rodriquez of the United States.

This race consisted of eight lengths of the pool, all lengths being in freestyle.

== Records ==
Prior to this competition, the existing world and Pan American Games records were as follows:

World record	Federica Pellegrini (ITA)	3:59.15	Rome, Italy	July 26, 2009
Pan American Games record	Elizabeth Hill (USA)	4:10.48	Santo Domingo, Dominican Republic	August 13, 2003

== Qualification ==
Each National Olympic Committee (NOC) was able to enter up to two entrants providing they had met the A standard (4:19.9) in the qualifying period (January 1, 2010 to September 4, 2011). NOCs were also permitted to enter one athlete providing they had met the B standard (4:27.7) in the same qualifying period.

== Results ==
All times are in minutes and seconds.

KEY:	q	Fastest non-qualifiers	Q	Qualified	NR	National record	PB	Personal best	SB	Seasonal best

=== Heats ===
The first round was held on October 17.

Rank	Heat	Lane	Name	Nationality	Time	Notes
1	2	4	Andreina Pinto	Venezuela	4:16.12	QA
2	3	5	Kristel Kobrich	Chile	4:16.23	QA
3	1	4	Gillian Ryan	United States	4:16.51	QA
4	1	5	Patricia Castañeda	Mexico	4:16.91	QA
5	1	6	Cecilia Biagioli	Argentina	4:16.96	QA
6	1	3	Joanna Maranhão	Brazil	4:18.85	QA
7	3	4	Ashley Steenvoorden	United States	4:19.16	QA
8	2	5	Susana Escobar	Mexico	4:20.16	QA
9	3	2	Yanel Pinto	Venezuela	4:22.56	QB
10	2	2	Manuella Lyrio	Brazil	4:22.97	QB
11	2	6	Bridget Coley	Canada	4:23.04	QB
12	1	2	Samantha Arevalo	Ecuador	4:24.81	QB
13	3	3	Alexia Benitez	El Salvador	4:26.05	QB
14	2	3	Sherry Liu	Canada	4:26.80	QB
15	3	6	Virginia Bardach	Argentina	4:30.23	QB
16	3	7	Andrea Cedron	Peru	4:33.75	QB
17	2	7	Britany van Lange	Guyana	4:57.58	

=== B Final ===
The B final was also held on October 17.

Rank	Lane	Name	Nationality	Time	Notes
9	2	Sherry Liu	Canada	4:18.11	
10	4	Yanel Pinto	Venezuela	4:20.13	
11	6	Alexia Benitez	El Salvador	4:23.53	
12	3	Bridget Coley	Canada	4:26.36	
13	1	Andrea Cedron	Peru	4:26.76	
14	7	Virginia Bardach	Argentina	4:27.31	
15	5	Manuella Lyrio	Brazil	4:29.35	

=== A Final ===
The A final was also held on October 17.

Rank	Lane	Name	Nationality	Time	Notes
1st place, gold medalist(s)	3	Gillian Ryan	United States	4:11.58	
2nd place, silver medalist(s)	4	Andreina Pinto	Venezuela	4:11.81	
3rd place, bronze medalist(s)	5	Kristel Kobrich	Chile	4:13.31	
4	7	Joanna Maranhão	Brazil	4:13.71	
5	2	Cecilia Biagioli	Argentina	4:15.41	
6	6	Patricia Castañeda	Mexico	4:17.20	
7	8	Susana Escobar	Mexico	4:17.55	
8	1	Ashley Steenvoorden	United States	4:20.51	
