= Swimming at the 2011 Pan American Games – Men's 100 metre backstroke =

Men's 100 metre backstroke at the 2011 Pan American Games
- Venue: Scotiabank Aquatics Center
- Dates: October 17 (preliminaries and finals)
- Competitors: 11 from 8 nations

Medalists
Gold medal	Thiago Pereira	Brazil
Silver medal	Eugene Godsoe	United States
Bronze medal	Guilherme Guido	Brazil

The men's 100 metre backstroke competition of the swimming events at the 2011 Pan American Games took place on October 17 at the Scotiabank Aquatics Center in the municipality of Zapopan, near Guadalajara, Mexico. The defending Pan American Games champion was Randall Bal of the United States

This race consisted of two lengths of the pool, all in backstroke.

== Records ==
Prior to this competition, the existing world and Pan American Games records were as follows:

World record	Aaron Peirsol (USA)	51.94	Indianapolis, United States	July 8, 2009
Pan American Games record	Randall Bal (USA)	53.66	Rio de Janeiro, Brazil	July 22, 2007

== Qualification ==
Each National Olympic Committee (NOC) was able to enter up to two entrants providing they had met the A standard (56.7) in the qualifying period (January 1, 2010 to September 4, 2011). NOCs were also permitted to enter one athlete providing they had met the B standard (58.6) in the same qualifying period.

== Results ==
All times are in minutes and seconds.

KEY:	q	Fastest non-qualifiers	Q	Qualified	GR	Games record	NR	National record	PB	Personal best	SB	Seasonal best

=== Heats ===
The first round was held on October 17.

Rank	Heat	Lane	Name	Nationality	Time	Notes
1	2	4	Eugene Godsoe	United States	55.04	QA
2	2	5	Thiago Pereira	Brazil	55.50	QA
3	1	4	David Russell	United States	55.57	QA
4	1	5	Guilherme Guido	Brazil	55.71	QA
5	1	3	Federico Grabich	Argentina	56.00	QA
6	2	6	Pedro Medel	Cuba	56.71	QA
7	2	3	Omar Pinzón	Colombia	56.82	QA
8	1	6	Luis Rojas	Venezuela	57.61	QA
9	1	2	Charles Hockin	Paraguay	57.65	QB
10	2	7	Miguel Robles	Mexico	57.93	QB
11	2	2	Anival Rodriguez	Mexico	59.29	QB

=== B Final ===
The B final was also held on October 17.

Rank	Lane	Name	Nationality	Time	Notes
9	4	Miguel Robles	Mexico	58.29	
10	5	Anival Rodriguez	Mexico	59.11	

=== A Final ===
The A final was also held on October 17.

Rank	Lane	Name	Nationality	Time	Notes
1st place, gold medalist(s)	5	Thiago Pereira	Brazil	54.56	
2nd place, silver medalist(s)	4	Eugene Godsoe	United States	54.61	
3rd place, bronze medalist(s)	6	Guilherme Guido	Brazil	54.81	
4	3	David Russell	United States	54.87	
5	2	Federico Grabich	Argentina	55.22	
6	7	Pedro Medel	Cuba	56.16	
7	1	Luis Rojas	Venezuela	57.54	
8	8	Charles Hockin	Paraguay	57.63	
