= Swimming at the 2015 Pan American Games – Men's 100 metre butterfly =

Men's 100 metre butterfly at the 2015 Pan American Games
- Venue: CIBC Pan Am/Parapan Am Aquatics Centre and Field House
- Dates: July 16 (preliminaries and finals)
- Competitors: 17 from 14 nations
- Winning time: 52.04

Medalists
Gold medal	Giles Smith	United States
Silver medal	Santiago Grassi	Argentina
Bronze medal	Santo Condorelli	Canada

The men's 100 metre butterfly competition of the swimming events at the 2015 Pan American Games took place on July 16 at the CIBC Pan Am/Parapan Am Aquatics Centre and Field House in Toronto, Canada. The defending Pan American Games champion was Albert Subirats of Venezuela.

This race consisted of two lengths of the pool, all lengths in butterfly. The top eight swimmers from the heats would qualify for the A final (where the medals would be awarded), while the next best eight swimmers would qualify for the B final.

== Records ==
Prior to this competition, the existing world and Pan American Games records were as follows:

World record	Michael Phelps (USA)	49.82	Rome, Italy	August 1, 2009
Pan American Games record	Kaio de Almeida (BRA)	52.05	Rio de Janeiro, Brazil	July 18, 2007

The following new records were set during this competition.

Date	Event	Name	Nationality	Time	Record
16 July	A Final	Giles Smith	United States	52.04	GR

== Qualification ==
Each National Olympic Committee (NOC) was able to enter up to two entrants providing they had met the A standard (53.99) in the qualifying period (January 1, 2014 to May 1, 2015). NOCs were also permitted to enter one athlete providing they had met the B standard (57.23) in the same qualifying period. All other competing athletes were entered as universality spots.

== Schedule ==
All times are Eastern Time Zone (UTC-4).

Date	Time	Round
July 16, 2015	10:56	Heats
July 16, 2015	20:13	Final B
July 16, 2015	20:18	Final A

== Results ==
KEY:	q	Fastest non-qualifiers	Q	Qualified	GR	Games record	NR	National record	PB	Personal best	SB	Seasonal best

=== Heats ===
The first round was held on July 16.

Rank	Heat	Lane	Name	Nationality	Time	Notes
1	3	4	Giles Smith	United States	52.13	QA
2	3	3	Mauricio Fiol	Peru	52.25	QA
3	2	5	Santiago Grassi	Argentina	52.34	QA
4	2	2	Long Yuan Gutierrez	Mexico	52.57	QA
5	1	5	Albert Subirats	Venezuela	52.60	QA
6	3	5	Santo Condorelli	Canada	52.67	QA
7	1	4	Arthur Mendes	Brazil	52.85	QA
8	2	3	Eugene Godsoe	United States	52.89	QA
9	3	6	Luiz Martínez	Guatemala	52.90	QB
10	1	3	Coleman Allen	Canada	53.23	QB
11	1	6	Ben Hockin	Paraguay	53.63	QB
12	2	6	Marcos Barale	Argentina	53.73	QB
13	3	7	Dylan Carter	Trinidad and Tobago	53.89	QB
14	3	2	Esnaider Reales	Colombia	54.42	QB
15	1	2	Andrew Torres	Puerto Rico	54.69	QB
16	2	7	Allan Gutiérrez Castro	Honduras	55.52	QB
17	1	7	Aldo Castillo Sulca	Bolivia	57.25	
	2	4	Thiago Pereira	Brazil		DNS

=== B Final ===
The B final was also held on July 16.

Rank	Lane	Name	Nationality	Time	Notes
9	5	Ben Hockin	Paraguay	53.45	
10	4	Coleman Allen	Canada	53.46	
11	3	Marcos Barale	Argentina	53.47	
12	6	Esnaider Reales	Colombia	54.03	
13	2	Andrew Torres	Puerto Rico	54.77	
14	7	Allan Gutiérrez Castro	Honduras	55.21	
15	1	Aldo Castillo Sulca	Bolivia	56.97	

=== A Final ===
The A final was also held on July 16.

Rank	Lane	Name	Nationality	Time	Notes
1st place, gold medalist(s)	4	Giles Smith	United States	52.04	GR
2nd place, silver medalist(s)	5	Santiago Grassi	Argentina	52.09	NR
3rd place, bronze medalist(s)	2	Santo Condorelli	Canada	52.42	
4	6	Albert Subirats	Venezuela	52.52	
5	3	Long Yuan Gutierrez	Mexico	52.58	
6	1	Eugene Godsoe	United States	52.66	
7	7	Arthur Mendes	Brazil	52.73	
8	8	Luiz Martínez	Guatemala	52.75	

- Peruvian swimmer Mauricio Fiol was suspended by his team and pulled from the final for testing positive for stanozolol.
