= Swimming at the 2007 Pan American Games – Women's 400 metre freestyle =

The Women's 400m Freestyle event at the 2007 Pan American Games took place at the Maria Lenk Aquatic Park in Rio de Janeiro, Brazil, with the final being swum on July 17.

== Medalists ==
| Gold | Jessica Rodriguez; United States |
| Silver | Patricia Castañeda; Mexico |
| Bronze | Corinne Showalter; United States |

== Records ==
| World Record | Laure Manaudou (FRA) | 4:02.13 | 2006-08-06 | (Hungary) Budapest |
| Pan Am Record | Elizabeth Hill (USA) | 4:10.48 | 2003-08-13 | (Dominican Republic) Santo Domingo |

== Results ==
=== Finals ===
| Place | Swimmer | Country | Time | Note |
|---|---|---|---|---|
| 1 | Jessica Rodriguez | United States | 4:12.22 | |
| 2 | Patricia Castañeda | Mexico | 4:13.34 | |
| 3 | Corinne Showalter | United States | 4:13.72 | |
| 4 | Chanelle Charron-Watson | Canada | 4:14.08 | |
| 5 | Monique Ferreira | Brazil | 4:14.54 | |
| 6 | Cecilia Biagioli | Argentina | 4:16.57 | |
| 7 | Zsofia Balazs | Canada | 4:17.87 | |
| 8 | Kristel Köbrich | Chile | 4:19.10 | |
