= Swimming at the 2015 Pan American Games – Women's 200 metre backstroke =

Women's 200 metre backstroke at the 2015 Pan American Games
- Venue: CIBC Pan Am/Parapan Am Aquatics Centre and Field House
- Dates: July 15 (preliminaries and finals)
- Competitors: 17 from 12 nations
- Winning time: 2:08.22

Medalists
Gold medal	Hilary Caldwell	Canada
Silver medal	Dominique Bouchard	Canada
Bronze medal	Clara Smiddy	United States

The women's 200 metre backstroke competition of the swimming events at the 2015 Pan American Games took place on July 15 at the CIBC Pan Am/Parapan Am Aquatics Centre and Field House in Toronto, Canada. The defending Pan American Games champion was Elizabeth Pelton of the United States.

This race consisted of four lengths of the pool, all lengths in backstroke. The top eight swimmers from the heats would qualify for the A final (where the medals would be awarded), while the next best eight swimmers would qualify for the B final.

== Records ==
Prior to this competition, the existing world and Pan American Games records were as follows:

World record	Missy Franklin (USA)	2:04.06	London, United Kingdom	August 3, 2012
Pan American Games record	Elizabeth Pelton (USA)	2:08.99	Guadalajara, Mexico	October 20, 2011

The following new records were set during this competition.

Date	Event	Name	Nationality	Time	Record
15 July	A Final	Hilary Caldwell	Canada	2:08.22	GR

== Qualification ==
Each National Olympic Committee (NOC) was able to enter up to two entrants providing they had met the A standard (2:20.19) in the qualifying period (January 1, 2014 to May 1, 2015). NOCs were also permitted to enter one athlete providing they had met the B standard (2:28.60) in the same qualifying period. All other competing athletes were entered as universality spots.

== Schedule ==
All times are Eastern Time Zone (UTC-4).

Date	Time	Round
July 15, 2015	11:00	Heats
July 15, 2015	20:25	Final B
July 15, 2015	20:32	Final A

== Results ==
KEY:	q	Fastest non-qualifiers	Q	Qualified	GR	Games record	NR	National record	PB	Personal best	SB	Seasonal best

=== Heats ===
The first round was held on July 15.

Rank	Heat	Lane	Name	Nationality	Time	Notes
1	2	4	Dominique Bouchard	Canada	2:09.59	QA
2	3	4	Hilary Caldwell	Canada	2:10.15	QA
3	2	5	Clara Smiddy	United States	2:11.94	QA
4	1	4	Kylie Stewart	United States	2:12.30	QA
5	3	5	Joanna Maranhão	Brazil	2:12.35	QA
6	1	6	Gisela Morales	Guatemala	2:12.38	QA
7	3	3	Andrea Berrino	Argentina	2:13.62	QA
8	1	5	Maria González	Mexico	2:14.28	QA
9	3	6	Estela Davis	Mexico	2:16.49	QB
10	2	3	Carolina Colorado	Colombia	2:16.52	QB
11	1	3	Florencia Perotti	Argentina	2:17.63	QB
12	3	7	Karen Vilorio	Honduras	2:18.45	QB
13	2	6	Luiza Padovan	Brazil	2:20.08	QB
14	1	2	Carla González	Venezuela	2:20.25	QB
15	3	2	McKenna DeBever	Peru	2:20.67	QB
16	2	2	Inés Remersaro	Uruguay	2:21.33	QB
17	2	7	Lara Butler	Cayman Islands	2:26.43	

=== B Final ===
The B final was also held on July 15.

Rank	Lane	Name	Nationality	Time	Notes
9	5	Carolina Colorado	Colombia	2:14.87	
10	4	Estela Davis	Mexico	2:16.61	
11	1	McKenna DeBever	Peru	2:16.76	NR
12	3	Florencia Perotti	Argentina	2:17.55	
13	7	Carla González	Venezuela	2:18.77	
14	6	Karen Vilorio	Honduras	2:19.42	
15	2	Luiza Padovan	Brazil	2:21.17	
16	8	Inés Remersaro	Uruguay	2:21.33	

=== A Final ===
The A final was also held on July 15.

Rank	Lane	Name	Nationality	Time	Notes
1st place, gold medalist(s)	5	Hilary Caldwell	Canada	2:08.22	GR
2nd place, silver medalist(s)	4	Dominique Bouchard	Canada	2:09.74	
3rd place, bronze medalist(s)	3	Clara Smiddy	United States	2:11.47	
4	6	Kylie Stewart	United States	2:11.92	
5	2	Joanna Maranhão	Brazil	2:12.05	SA
6	7	Gisela Morales	Guatemala	2:13.18	
7	1	Andrea Berrino	Argentina	2:14.38	
8	8	Maria González	Mexico	2:16.79	
