= Evan van Moerkerke =

Canadian swimmer (born 1993)

Personal information
- National team: Canada Netherlands
- Born: August 16, 1993 (age 32) London, Ontario, Canada
- Height: 210 cm (6 ft 11 in)

Sport
- Sport: Swimming
- Coach: Don Burton
Medal record
Men's swimming
Representing Canada
Pan American Games
Silver medal – second place	2015 Pan American Games	4 x 100 m freestyle relay

Evan van Moerkerke (born August 16, 1993) is a Canadian competitive swimmer. van Moerkerke won a silver at the 2015 Pan American Games in the 4 x 100 m freestyle relay.

In 2016, he was named to Canada's Olympic team for the 2016 Summer Olympics.

He is in his fourth year studying agricultural science at the University of Guelph. He comes from a family farm in Tillsonburg, Ontario
