= Gunnar Bentz =

American swimmer (born 1996)

Personal information
- Full name: Joseph Bentz
- Nickname: Gunnar
- National team: United States
- Born: January 3, 1996 (age 30) Atlanta, Georgia, U.S.
- Height: 6 ft 5 in (1.96 m)
- Weight: 183 lb (83 kg)

Sport
- Sport: Swimming
- Strokes: Individual medley, freestyle, butterfly
- Club: Dynamo Swim Club; Longhorn Aquatics
- College team: University of Georgia
- Coach: Jack Bauerle; Eddie Reese
Medal record
Men's swimming
Representing United States
Event	1st	2nd	3rd
Olympic Games	1	0	0
Pan American Games	0	1	1
World Junior Championships	2	0	2
Total	3	1	3
Olympic Games
Gold medal – first place	2016 Rio de Janeiro	4×200 m freestyle
Pan American Games
Silver medal – second place	2015 Toronto	4×200 m freestyle
Bronze medal – third place	2015 Toronto	200 m medley
World Junior Championships
Gold medal – first place	2013 Dubai	200 m medley
Gold medal – first place	2013 Dubai	400 m medley
Bronze medal – third place	2013 Dubai	4 × 200 m freestyle
Bronze medal – third place	2013 Dubai	4×100 m mixed medley
Junior Pan Pacific Championships
Silver medal – second place	2012 Honolulu	4×200 m freestyle
Bronze medal – third place	2012 Honolulu	400 m medley
Representing the Georgia Bulldogs
Event	1st	2nd	3rd
NCAA Championships	0	0	2
Total	0	0	2
By race
Event	1st	2nd	3rd
200 y butterfly	0	0	1
400 y medley	0	0	1
Total	0	0	2
NCAA Championships
Bronze medal – third place	2015 Iowa City	400 y medley
Bronze medal – third place	2017 Indianapolis	200 y butterfly

Joseph "Gunnar" Bentz (born January 3, 1996) is an American former competitive swimmer and Olympic gold medalist.

== Early life ==
Bentz graduated from St. Pius X Catholic High School in 2014.

== Career ==
He is a four-time medalist (two gold, two bronze) at the FINA World Junior Swimming Championships and a two-time medalist (one silver, one bronze) at the Pan American Games. Bentz competes for the University of Georgia with the Georgia Bulldogs swimming and diving team in American collegiate swimming. Bentz was the 2015 USA National Champion in the 400m Individual Medley. In June 2016, he qualified for the 4 × 200 m freestyle relay at the 2016 Summer Olympics. Bentz swam in the preliminaries of the 4 × 200 m freestyle relay at the 2016 Summer Olympics. Replaced by the team of Michael Phelps, Ryan Lochte, Conor Dwyer, and Townley Haas, Bentz was not in the final but received a medal.

In 2018, Gunnar Bentz was qualified for the 2019 Pan American Games in Lima, Peru.

=== Gas station incident during 2016 Olympics ===
On the morning of August 14, Bentz's teammate Ryan Lochte claimed that he, Bentz, Jack Conger, and Jimmy Feigen were robbed after four men forced them out of their taxi at gunpoint. Bentz, 20 at the time of this incident, was required to be back in the Olympic Village by 1:00 am as the 1:00 am curfew was relaxed just for team members 21 or older by Frank Busch, U.S.A. Swimming's national team director. The Brazilian authorities questioned this account, and after Lochte had flown home on August 16, Bentz and Conger were prevented from leaving the country and their passports were seized; this was done in order to have them testify as witnesses of the incident. Civil Police of Rio de Janeiro concluded that the athletes were not robbed, but instead had been involved in an incident at a gas station in Barra da Tijuca, west of the city. This investigation found that the swimmers stopped at a gas station near Casa França, where they were involved in a confrontation with security guards regarding vandalism some or all of the swimmers had caused in a bathroom while intoxicated. They also claimed that the swimmers had already paid in cash 100 reais ($31) and $20 in U.S. currency as compensation for objects from the bathroom which were damaged, such as a soap holder, a mirror, and a "Please Do Not Enter" sign.

According to anonymous police sources, Bentz and Conger told the police that Lochte's robbery story was fabricated. The Associated Press reported that Bentz and Conger "refuted Lochte's claim that the group was held up by armed assailants".

After Bentz returned to the United States, he released a statement about the incident. He admitted to urinating behind the gas station, and wrote that Lochte pulled down a framed metal advertisement, but denied witnessing any damage caused to the bathroom.

=== International Swimming League ===
In 2019, Bentz was member of the 2019 International Swimming League, representing Team Iron.

=== 2020 Olympic Trials ===
In 2021, Bentz qualified for the 2020 Olympic Team, placing 2nd in the 200m butterfly at the finals of the US Olympic Team Trials.

== Career best times ==
=== Long course (50-meter pool) ===
Event	Time	Venue	Date
200 m freestyle	1:47.33	Omaha	June 28, 2016
200 m Butterfly	1:55.34	Omaha	June 16, 2021
200 m IM	1:58.31	Indianapolis	July 1, 2017
400 m IM	4:11.66	Indianapolis	June 29, 2017
