= Arthur Mendes =

Brazilian swimmer (born 1993)

Personal information
- Full name: Arthur Franklin Mendes Filho
- Nationality: Brazil
- Born: September 7, 1993 (age 32) Cáceres, Mato Grosso, Brazil
- Height: 1.81 m (5 ft 11 in)
- Weight: 77 kg (170 lb)

Sport
- Sport: Swimming
- Strokes: Butterfly
Medal record
Men's swimming
Representing Brazil
Pan American Games
Gold medal – first place	2015 Toronto	4×100 m medley
World Junior Championships
Bronze medal – third place	2011 Lima	100 m butterfly

Arthur Franklin Mendes Filho (born August 7, 1993 in Cáceres) is a Brazilian swimmer.

He was at the 2011 FINA World Junior Swimming Championships, in Lima, Peru, where he won a bronze medal in the 100-metre butterfly.

At the 2015 Pan American Games in Toronto, Ontario, Canada, Mendes won the gold medal in the 4×100-metre medley relay, where he broke the Pan American Games record with a time of 3:32.68, along with Marcelo Chierighini, Felipe França Silva and Guilherme Guido. He also finished 7th in the 100 metre butterfly.

At the 2015 World Aquatics Championships in Kazan, Mendes finished 10th in the Men's 4 × 100 metre medley relay and 24th in the Men's 100 metre butterfly.
