= Dominique Bouchard =

Canadian swimmer (born 1991)

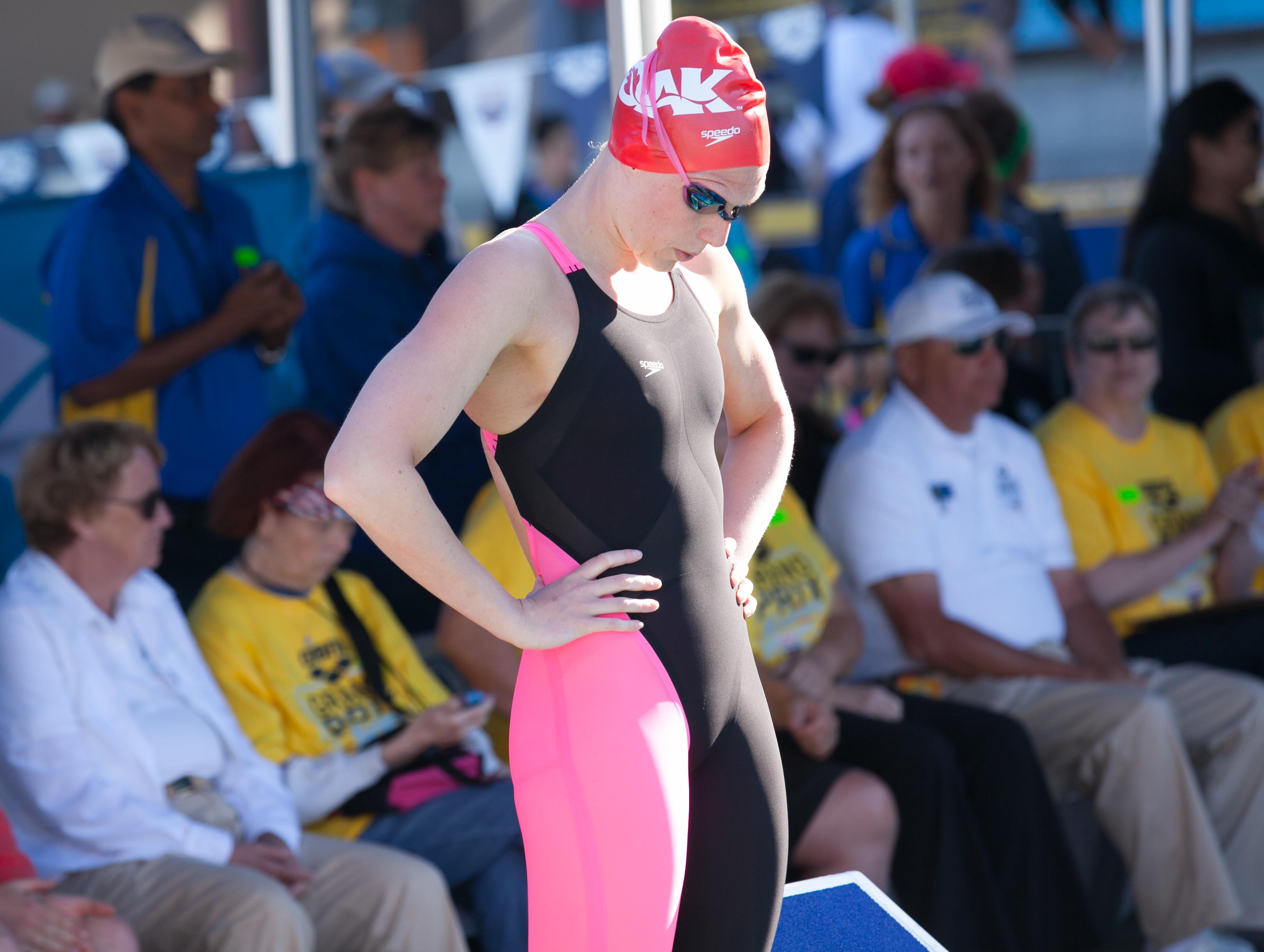

Personal information
- Born: May 29, 1991 (age 35) St. Albert, Alberta, Canada
- Height: 5 ft 9 in (175 cm)
- Weight: 135 lb (61 kg)

Sport
- Country: Canada
- Sport: Swimming
- Strokes: Backstroke
- Club: Oakville Aquatic Club, North Bay Y Titans Swim Club, Kirkland Lake Aquatic Club
- College team: University of Missouri (U.S.)
Medal record
Women's swimming
Representing Canada
Pan American Games
Gold medal – first place	2015 Toronto	4 x 100 m freestyle
Silver medal – second place	2015 Toronto	200 m backstroke
Silver medal – second place	2015 Toronto	4×100 m medley

Dominique Bouchard (born May 29, 1991) is a Canadian Olympian and celebrated four-time NCAA All-American competition swimmer who specialized in backstroke events. She is now retired from competitive swimming and has completed a Doctorate in Medicine. Dr. Bouchard is now a licensed Medical Doctor practicing Family Medicine.

== Career ==
Bouchard is an Olympian and was a long time member of the women's Canadian National Swim Team. She reached semi-finals in both her individual events, i.e. the 100M and 200M backstroke (top ten overall finish in the 200M backstroke) at the 2016 Rio de Janeiro Olympic Games. Bouchard has a considerable amount of international experience having represented Canada at the 2015 World Aquatic Championship in Kazan Russia where she achieved a sixth-place finish (200m backstroke). She was a multiple medalist at the 2015 Pan American Games in Toronto Canada (silver-200m Backstroke; silver 400 medley relay; and gold in the 4x 100 freestyle relay). Bouchard has also represented Canada at the 2014 Pan Pacific Swimming Championships (5th in 100m Back and 6 in 200m Backstroke) in Gold Coast Australia, as well as in 2010 in Irvine, California. She also competed in the 2011 Summer World University Games in Shenzhen, China, and was a finalist in the 100-m backstroke (8th), 200-m backstroke (5th) and 4x100-m medley relay (6th).

Born in St. Albert, Alberta, she also lived in Toronto and but started competitive swimming in Kirkland Lake, Ontario, before heading to North Bay. The turning point in her swimming career was meeting coach Cliff Noth, who moved to North Bay from Vancouver and had experience working with the national team. Bouchard is a consummate student-athlete and holds a master's degree in health administration from the University of Missouri (magna cum laude) as well as a B.Sc. in biology and B.A. in psychology (both cum laude) from this same institution. Among Bouchard’s favourite swimming moments is earning a second-place finish at the NCAA Championships in both 2011 and 2012. Although affiliated with the Oakville Aquatic Club, Bouchard continued to train at her alma mater with the Missouri Tigers, where she was a four-time All-American and set the school record in the 200-yard backstroke. Bouchard was inducted into the Sports Hall of Fame of the University of Missouri in 2018.

She retired from competitive swimming in December 2017. Bouchard has completed a Medical Degree at the Northern Ontario School of Medicine and is now a practicing Family Physician. She also manages to provide advice to swim clubs and helps mentor the next generation of swimmers on a part-time basis. Dr. Bouchard was inducted into the North Bay Sports Hall of Fame on May 11, 2024.
