= 2008 NCAA Division I Men's Swimming and Diving Championships =

American college aquatic sports competition

2008 NCAA Division I Swimming and Diving Championships
- Host city: (Washington (state)) Federal Way, Washington
- Date: March 2008
- Venue: Weyerhaeuser Aquatic Center

The 2008 NCAA Division I Men's Swimming and Diving Championships were contested in March 2008 at the Weyerhaeuser Aquatic Center in Federal Way, Washington at the 85th annual NCAA-sanctioned swim meet to determine the team and individual national champions of Division I men's collegiate swimming and diving in the United States.

Arizona topped the team standings, finishing 94 points ahead of Texas. It was the Wildcats' first team national title.

== Team standings ==
- Note: Top 10 only
- (H) = Hosts
- ^{(DC)} = Defending champions
- Full results

Rank	Team	Points
1st place, gold medalist(s)	Arizona	500 1/2
2nd place, silver medalist(s)	Texas	406
3rd place, bronze medalist(s)	Stanford	344
4	California	332 1/2
5	Auburn ^{(DC)}	316
6	Michigan	271 1/2
7	Georgia	229
8	Florida	210
9	Tennessee	172
10	Indiana	166

== Swimming results ==
Event	Gold		Silver		Bronze	
50 freestyle	César Cielo; Auburn	18.52	Alex Righi; Yale	19.08	Albert Subirats; Arizona	19.26
100 freestyle	César Cielo; Auburn	40.92; US	Alex Righi; Yale	42.13	Nicolas Oliveira; Arizona	42.42
200 freestyle	David Walters; Texas	1:32.56	Darian Townsend; Arizona	1:32.85	Matt McGinnis; Texas	1:32.93
500 freestyle	Sebastien Rouault; Georgia	4:09.48	Michael Klueh; Texas	4:10.00	Jean Basson; Arizona	4:12.75
1650 freestyle	Sebastien Rouault; Georgia	14:26.86	Troy Prinsloo; Georgia	14:28.06	Michael Klueh; Texas	14:36.07
100 backstroke	Ben Hesen; Indiana	44.72	Albert Subirats; Arizona	45.40	David Russell; California	45.42
200 backstroke	Pat Schirk; Pennsylvania State	1:40.22	Cory Chitwood; Arizona	1:41.20	Roland Rudolf; Florida	1:41.49
100 breaststroke	Paul Kornfeld; Stanford	52.03	Damir Dugonjič; California Marcus Titus; Arizona	52.61	Not awarded	
200 breaststroke	Paul Kornfeld; Stanford	1:53.11	Scott Span; Michigan	1:54.16	Sean Mahoney; California	1:54.65
100 butterfly	Albert Subirats; Arizona	45.07	Alexei Puninski; Auburn	45.51	Austin Staab; Stanford	45.61
200 butterfly	Gil Stovall; Georgia	1:41.33; NC	Mark Dylla; Georgia	1:42.08	Danny Beal; Stanfor	1:42.79
200 IM	Darian Townsend; Arizona	1:42.72	Ricky Berens; Texas	1:43.25	Todd Patrick; Indiana	1:44.55
400 IM	Alex Vanderkaay; Michigan	3:41.58	Sebastien Rouault; Georgia	3:42.25	Bradley Ally; Florida	3:43.59
200 freestyle relay	Auburn; César Cielo (18.47) US; Alexei Puninski (18.95); Luke Weniger (19.31); Scott Goodrich (18.93)	1:15.66	Arizona; Albert Subirats (19.18); Jordan Smith (19.04); Nicolas Oliveira (19.01); Ryan Richardson (19.32)	1:16.55	California; William Copeland (19.42); Jernej Godec (19.08); Joe Whittington (18.96); Graeme Moore (19.48)	1:16.94
400 freestyle relay	Arizona; Albert Subirats (42.52); Darian Townsend (41.78); Nicolas Oliveira (42.46); Joel Greenshields (42.25)	2:49.01	Auburn; César Cielo (41.12); Alexei Puninski (41.96); Kohlton Norys (42.69); Stephen Scheren (43.71)	2:49.48	California; William Copeland (42.66); Jernej Godec (42.76); Joe Whittington (42.73); Dominik Meichtry (42.72)	2:50.87
800 freestyle relay	Arizona; Jean Basson (1:34.09); Darian Townsend (1:31.79); Joel Greenshields (1:33.75); Nicolas Oliveira (1:33.22)	6:12.85; MR	Texas; David Walters (1:34.04); Matt McGinnis (1:33.35); Michael Klueh (1:33.61); Ricky Berens (1:35.54)	6:16.64	Tennessee; Jonas Persson (1:33.46); Nolan Morrell (1:35.51); Andrew Thirlwell (1:36.09); Michael Wolfe (1:35.55)	6:20.61
200 medley relay	Auburn; Scott Goodrich (21.69); David Maras (23.55); Alexei Puninski (19.81); César Cielo (18.19)	1:23.24; US	Arizona; Albert Subirats (20.73); Marcus Titus (23.63); Darian Townsend (20.65); Jordan Smith (19.07)	1:24.08	Stanford; Eugene Godsoe (21.03); John Criste (23.75); Jason Dunford (19.81); Alex Coville (18.55)	1:23.14
400 medley relay	Arizona; Albert Subirats (44.96); Ivan Barnes (52.56); Darian Townsend (44.96); Joel Greenshields (41.95)	3:04.43	California; David Russell (45.93); Damir Dugonjić (51.25); Jernej Godec (46.55); William Copeland (41.65)	3:05.38	Stanford; Eugene Godsoe (46.75); Paul Kornfield (51.42); Austin Staab (44.86); Jason Dunford (42.40)	3:01.91

Legend: US – U.S. Open record; NC – NCAA record; MR – Meet record;

== Diving results ==
Event	Gold		Silver		Bronze	
1 m diving	Chris Colwill; Georgia	407.25	Magnus Frick; Hawaii	399.70	Terry Horner; Florida State	396.15
3 m diving	Reuben Ross; Miami	466.80; MR	Chris Colwill; Georgia	460.55	Aaron Fleshner; Alabama	414.80
Platform diving	Sean Moore; Ohio State	478.20; MR	Chris Colwill; Georgia	460.60	David Colutri; Purdue	453.65

Legend: MR – Meet record;

== See also ==
- List of college swimming and diving teams
