= Zack Chetrat =

Canadian swimmer

Personal information
- Full name: Zackariah Chetrat
- Born: August 9, 1990 (age 35) Toronto, Ontario, Canada
- Home town: Oakville, Ontario, Canada
- Height: 183 cm (6 ft 0 in)
- Weight: 77 kg (170 lb)

Sport
- Sport: Swimming
- Club: High Performance Centre - Ontario
- Coach: Ben Titley
Medal record
Representing Canada
Pan American Games
Silver medal – second place	2015 Toronto	200 m butterfly
Bronze medal – third place	2015 Toronto	4×100 m medley

Zackariah Chetrat (born August 9, 1990) is a Canadian butterfly swimmer.
