= G Rene Ryan =

American swimmer (born 1995)

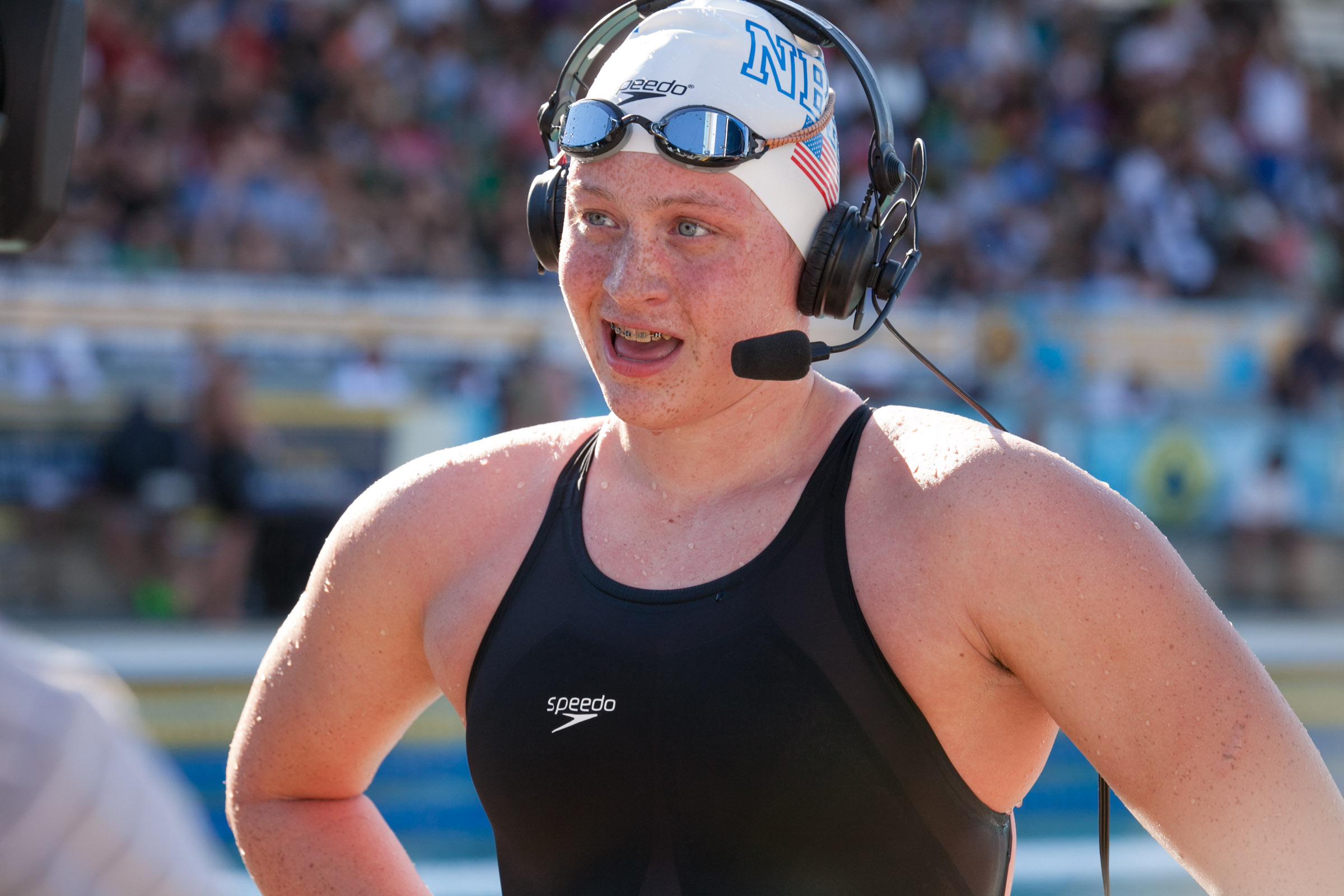
- Ryan in 2013

Personal information
- Nationality: USA
- Born: October 1, 1995 (age 30) Kutztown, Pennsylvania, U.S.
- Height: 5 ft 9 in (1.75 m)

Sport
- Sport: Swimming
- Strokes: freestyle
- College team: University of Michigan
Medal record
Women's swimming
Representing the United States
Junior World Championships
Gold medal – first place	2011 Lima	4×200 m freestyle
Silver medal – second place	2011 Lima	800 m freestyle
Bronze medal – third place	2011 Lima	400 m freestyle
Pan American Games
Gold medal – first place	2011 Guadalajara	400 m freestyle
Gold medal – first place	2015 Toronto	4×200 m freestyle
Bronze medal – third place	2015 Toronto	400 m freestyle

G Rene Ryan (born October 1, 1995) is an American swimmer from Kutztown, Pennsylvania. They won a United States Swimming Championships in the 800m freestyle, and two golds in the Pan American Games.

== Early life and education ==
Ryan was born in Kutztown, Pennsylvania on October 1, 1995. They moved to Baltimore, Maryland for their last three years of high school, where they took cyber courses from Kutztown High School so they could train at North Baltimore Aquatic Club, which, under coach Erik Posegay, produced ten Olympians, including Michael Phelps.

== Career ==
Ryan learned that Posegay was moving to NBAC shortly after their return from Lima, Peru, where they won silver and bronze medals at the FINA World Junior Swimming Championships in 2011.

Ryan was part of the 2012 United States Olympic Trials, finishing fourth in the 400m and seventh in the 800m.

On September 9, 2013, Ryan made a commitment to swim for Mike Bottom and the Michigan Wolverines at University of Michigan in Ann Arbor, Michigan for the start of the 2014 season.

== Personal life ==
Ryan is queer and non-binary and uses they/them pronouns. They have been involved in trans awareness, education, and activism during their time at the University of Michigan, pushing for gender inclusive restrooms and LGBTQ and queer inclusion in USA Swimming policies.
