= Eugene Godsoe =

American swimmer (born 1988)

Personal information
- Full name: Eugene Godsoe
- National team: United States
- Born: January 20, 1988 (age 38) Greensboro, North Carolina, U.S.
- Height: 1.88 m (6 ft 2 in)
- Weight: 77 kg (170 lb)

Sport
- Sport: Swimming
- Strokes: Backstroke, butterfly
- Club: Greensboro Swimming Association; SwimMAC; Stanford Aquatics (2015)
- College team: Stanford University (2006)
- Coach: Kevin Thornton (Greensboro Swim); Tony Batis (Stanford Aquatics); Skip Kenney, T. Knapp (Stanford U.); David Marsh (SwimMAC)
Medal record
Men's swimming
Representing the United States
World Championships (LC)
Silver medal – second place	2013 Barcelona	50 m butterfly
World Championships (SC)
Silver medal – second place	2014 Doha	50 m backstroke
Silver medal – second place	2014 Doha	4×100 m medley
Bronze medal – third place	2014 Doha	4×50 m medley
Pan American Games
Silver medal – second place	2011 Guadalajara	100 m butterfly
Silver medal – second place	2011 Guadalajara	100 m backstroke
Silver medal – second place	2011 Guadalajara	4×100 m freestyle
Silver medal – second place	2011 Guadalajara	4×100 m medley
Silver medal – second place	2015 Toronto	4×100 m medley
Bronze medal – third place	2015 Toronto	100 m backstroke
Bronze medal – third place	2015 Toronto	4×100 m freestyle
Representing the Stanford Cardinal
NCAA Championships
Gold medal – first place	2010 Columbus	100 y backstroke
Bronze medal – third place	2008 Federal Way	400 y medley relay
Bronze medal – third place	2009 College Station	200 y medley relay
Bronze medal – third place	2009 College Station	400 y medley relay
Bronze medal – third place	2010 Columbus	100 y butterfly
Bronze medal – third place	2010 Columbus	200 y backstroke
Bronze medal – third place	2010 Columbus	400 y medley relay

Eugene Godsoe (born January 20, 1988) is an American former competition swimmer who competed for the exceptionally strong program at Stanford University under Coaches Skip Kenney and Ted Knapp and specialized in backstroke and butterfly events. At the 2013 World Aquatics Championships, Godsoe placed 2nd in the 50m butterfly. He won a total of eleven medals in international competition from 2010 to 2015, which included eight silver and three bronze.

== Early life ==
Godsoe was born January 20, 1988 in Greensboro, North Carolina, to Yoko and Gene Godsoe. With a Japanese mother, he became fluent in Japanese. In high school, he swam with the Greensboro Swimming Association where he was coached by Kevin Thornton. Godsoe swam for Southeast Guilford High School, where as a senior in 2006, he broke both his records in the 100 butterfly and 100 backstroke for the fourth successive year at the North Carolina 3A state swimming championships. He swam the 100 butterfly in 48.78, and the 100 butterfly in 48.49, and was named the meet's Most Valuable Performer. In each of his four high school years, he was an All-American, ranking first nationally in the 100-yard backstroke and fourth in the 100-yard butterfly.

== Stanford University ==
He competed collegiately at Stanford University from 2006 to 2010, where he won an NCAA championship in the 100 yard backstroke and trained under Head Coach Skip Kenney, an International Swimming Hall of Fame inductee and Assistant Coach Ted Knapp. Godsoe won medals at the NCAA championships each years from 2008 to 2010, including his gold in the 100 yard backstroke in 2010. He returned to North Carolina after college to train at SwimMAC under head coach David Marsh.

At the 2012 Olympic trials, Godsoe failed to qualify for the US Olympic team, finishing fifth in his specialty the 100-meter backstroke, and seventh in the 100-meter butterfly.

== International competition highlights ==
Highlighting his achievements in international competition, at the PanAmerican games in 2011 in Guadalajara and 2015 in Toronto, Canada, he won a total of five silver medals and two bronze. At World Aquatic Long Course Championships in 2013 in Barcelona, Spain, he won a silver medal in the 50-meter butterfly. Adding relay medals to his international portfolio at the 2014 World Aquatic Short Course Championships, in Doha, a silver in the 50-meter backstroke, a silver in the 4x100 meter medley, and a bronze in the 4x50 meter medley.

In April 2015, he trained with Tony Batis at Stanford Aquatics in Palo Alto, to continue to be competitive on the international stage, and possibly with the hopes of making the 2016 Olympic team.
