= Jeremy Bagshaw =

Canadian swimmer (born 1992)

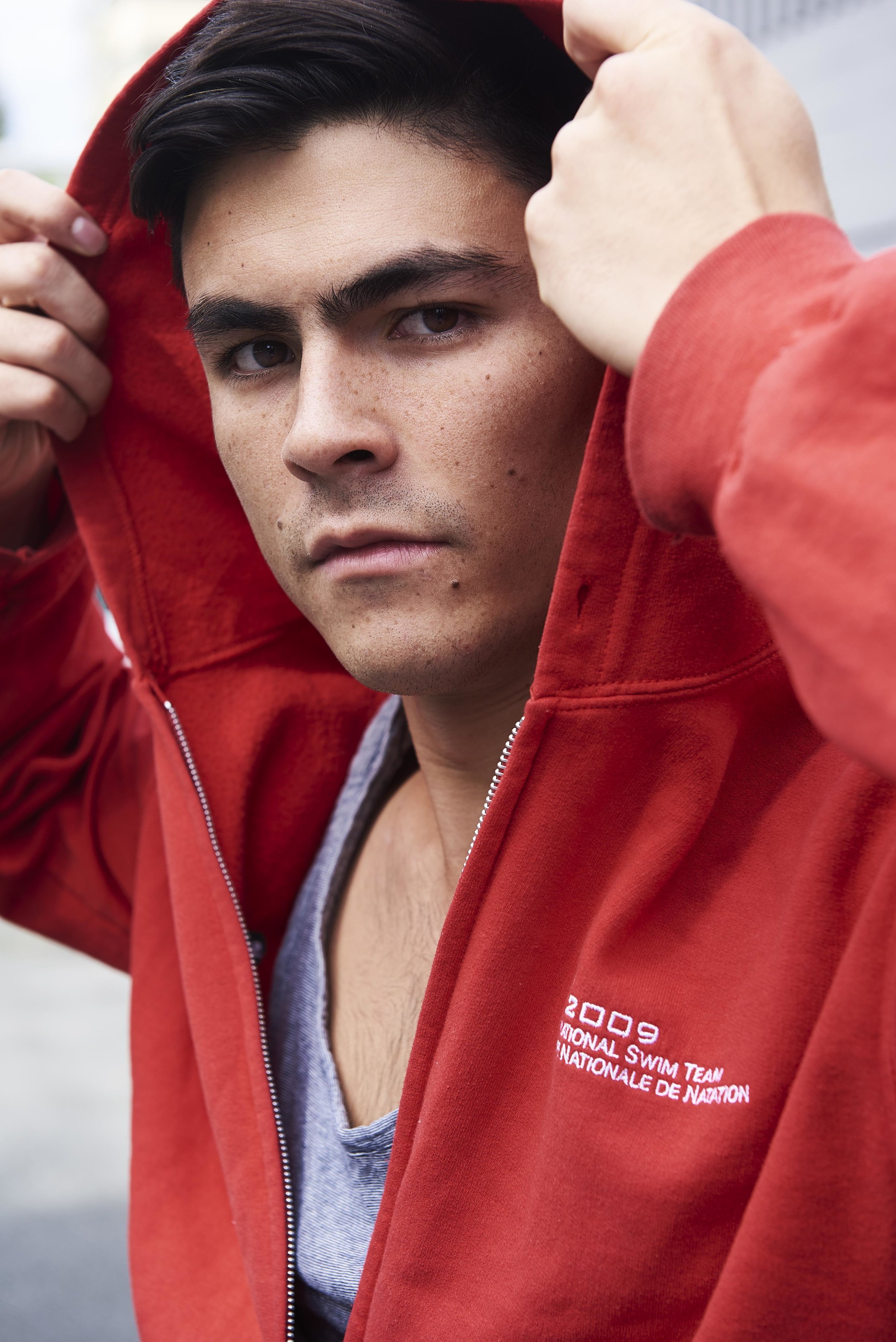
- Bagshaw in 2018

Personal information
- Born: 21 April 1992 (age 34) Singapore
- Home town: Victoria, British Columbia
- Height: 182 cm (6 ft 0 in)

Sport
- Country: Canada
- Sport: Swimming
Medal record
Men's swimming
Representing Canada
Commonwealth Games
Bronze medal – third place	2022 Birmingham	4×100 m freestyle
Pan American Games
Bronze medal – third place	2015 Toronto	4×200 m freestyle
Bronze medal – third place	2023 Santiago	4×100 m freestyle
Bronze medal – third place	2023 Santiago	4×200 m freestyle
Youth Olympic Games
Bronze medal – third place	2010 Singapore	200 m freestyle

Jeremy Bagshaw (born 21 April 1992) is a Canadian swimmer and physician. He competed in the men's 400 metre freestyle event at the 2017 World Aquatics Championships placing 16th.

Training at the University of California-Berkeley, Bagshaw swam for the California Golden Bears Men's swimming team, helping bring them many victories. In 2014 he was named team captain, and the Bears brought home the NCAA's championship. He is currently the fastest 400m freestyler in Canada, holding the time of 3:48.88.

He has represented Canada at the 2015 World Aquatics Championships,2016 World Aquatics Championships, 2017 World Aquatics Championships and the 2019 World Aquatics Championships, 2022 World Aquatics Championships,

Bagshaw was part of the Canadian team for the 2022 Commonwealth Games, and 2018 Commonwealth Games. He won a bronze with the men's team in the 4×100 m freestyle, having swum in the heats. This was the first men's relay medal for Canada at a major event since the 2015 Pan American Games, and the first at the Commonwealth Games since 2006.

Bagshaw competed for Canada at the 2024 Paris Olympic Games in the 4x200 metre freestyle relay, finishing 7th in his heat.
