= Michael Weiss (swimmer) =

American swimmer (born 1991)

Personal information
- Full name: Michael Weiss
- National team: United States
- Born: May 23, 1991 (age 35) Reno, Nevada
- Height: 6 ft 3 in (1.91 m)

Sport
- Sport: Swimming
- Strokes: Freestyle
- College team: University of Wisconsin–Madison
Medal record
Men's swimming
Representing the United States
World Championships (LC)
Silver medal – second place	2015 Kazan	4×200 m freestyle
World Championships (SC)
Gold medal – first place	2012 Istanbul	4×200 m freestyle
Gold medal – first place	2014 Doha	4×200 m freestyle
Pan American Games
Silver medal – second place	2015 Toronto	4×200 m freestyle
Silver medal – second place	2015 Toronto	4×100 m medley
Bronze medal – third place	2015 Toronto	200 m freestyle
Bronze medal – third place	2015 Toronto	4×100 m freestyle
Summer Universiade
Gold medal – first place	2013 Kazan	400 m medley
Silver medal – second place	2013 Kazan	4×200 m freestyle relay

Michael Weiss (born May 23, 1991) is an American competition swimmer who has represented the United States in international championships including the FINA World Championships, Pan American Games, and World University Games.

== Career ==
Weiss was born in Reno, Nevada, where he was a three-time Nevada Interscholastic Activities Association state champion while in high school, winning one championship event in each of his sophomore, junior and senior years.

Weiss won the gold medal at the short course 2012 FINA World Swimming Championships (25 m) in the 4x200-meter freestyle relay, having swum the anchor leg in the preliminary heats, which teammate Matt McLean swam in the final.

Weiss swam at the 2013 version of the made-for-television Duel in the Pool. He was also a gold medalist and broke the University Record at the 2013 Summer Universiade.

He again won gold at the short course 2014 FINA World Swimming Championships (25 m) in the 4x200-meter relay, having swum the third leg in the preliminary heats, which teammate Matt McLean (as in 2012) swam in the final. He also competed at the 2014 Pan Pacific Swimming Championships.
