= Nicholas Magana =

Peruvian swimmer

Personal information
- Full name: Nicholas Daryl Magaña Defago
- National team: Peru
- Born: 18 June 1996 (age 30) California, United States
- Height: 1.98 m (6 ft 6 in)
- Weight: 90 kg (198 lb)

Sport
- Sport: Swimming

Nicholas Daryl Magaña Defago (born 18 June 1996) is a Peruvian swimmer. He competed in the men's 100 metre freestyle event at the 2016 Summer Olympics.
