= Elizabeth Hill Newman =

American swimmer (born 1985)

Elizabeth Hill
Personal information
- Full name: Mary Elizabeth Hill
- Nickname: Elizabeth Newman
- National team: United States
- Born: November 8, 1985 (age 40) Atlanta, Georgia, U.S.

Sport
- Sport: Swimming
- Strokes: Freestyle
- Club: Dynamo Swim Club
- College team: University of Georgia
Medal record
Women's swimming
Representing the United States
Pan Pacific Championships
| Gold medal – first place | 2002 Yokohama | 4x200m Freestyle |
Pan American Games
| Gold medal – first place | 2003 Santo Domingo | 400m Freestyle |
| Gold medal – first place | 2003 Santo Domingo | 4x200m Freestyle |
World Student Games
| Gold medal – first place | 2005 Izmir | 4x200m Freestyle |

Mary Elizabeth Hill (born November 8, 1985) is a former freestyle swimmer from the United States, who swam for the University of Georgia, who won the gold medal in the women's 400-metre freestyle event at the 2003 Pan American Games.

Born in Atlanta on November 8, 1985, during High School, Hill swam for the Dynamo Swim Club under Head Coach Ed Spencer. Showing dominance in the 11-12 age group while swimming for the Dynamo Club, at the December 1999 Woodie B. Malone Meet in Atlanta, Hill won the 200 and 400 IM, the 100 and 200 Butterfly, the 200 Backstroke and the 500 freestyle. Swimming for the Dynamo Club, Hill won the 200 and 400 freestyle, and the 200 Butterfly at the Georgia Senior State Championship and won the high points award for the 16-under girls division. The Dynamo Swim Club won the 18 and under National Championship title in Austin, Texas in April 2001. The Dynamo Women's team, with Hill's contributions, placed fifth in overall team competition. Hill came in 10th in the 400 freestyle, and within scoring range in the 400 and 800 freestyle relays in which she participated.

== University of Georgia ==
While at the University of Georgia, she co-captained the Women's team as an upperclassman. She swam with the 2005 National Championship team and competed with Georgia when they won the 2006 Southeastern Conference Championship Championship. Newman received NCAA All-American honors seven times and captured an American record.

She won gold in the 800-metre free relay at the 2005 Summer Universiade, and finished fifth in the 200-metre freestyle and seventh in the 200-metre butterfly. In 2005, Hill took seventh in the 200-metre butterfly and eighth in the 200-metre freestyle at the U.S. World Championship Trials.

== See also ==
- List of University of Georgia people
