= Marcos Lavado =

Venezuelan swimmer (born 1991)

Personal information
- Born: August 22, 1991 (age 34) Barquisimeto, Venezuela

Sport
- Sport: Swimming
- Strokes: Butterfly
Medal record
Representing Venezuela
Pan American Games
Bronze medal – third place	2011 Guadalajara	4x200m freestyle relay
Central American and Caribbean Games
Gold medal – first place	2018 Barranquilla	4x200m freestyle relay

Marcos Alfonso Lavado Mora (born August 22, 1991) is a Venezuelan swimmer. At the 2012 Summer Olympics, he competed in the Men's 200 metre butterfly, finishing in 27th place overall in the heats, failing to qualify for the semifinals, and was also part of the Venezuelan 4 x 100 m team. He was part of the Venezuelan team that won bronze in the men's 4 x 200 m freestyle relay at the 2011 Pan American Games.
