= Federico Grabich =

Argentine swimmer (born 1990)

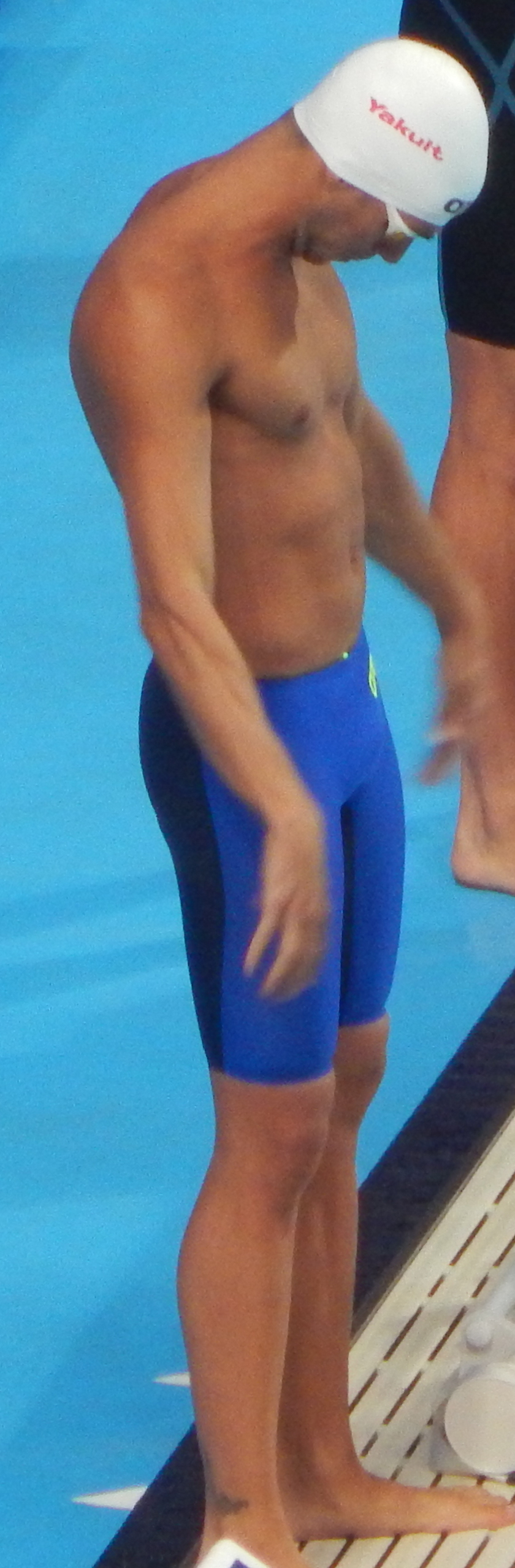
- Grabich at the 100 m free final in Kazan, 2015

Personal information
- National team: Argentina
- Born: 26 March 1990 (age 36) Casilda, Argentina
- Height: 1.93 m (6 ft 4 in)
- Weight: 92 kg (203 lb)

Sport
- Sport: Swimming
- Strokes: Freestyle, backstroke
Medal record
Men's swimming
Representing Argentina
World Championships (LC)
Bronze medal – third place	2015 Kazan	100 m freestyle
Pan American Games
Gold medal – first place	2015 Toronto	100 m freestyle
Silver medal – second place	2015 Toronto	200 m freestyle
Bronze medal – third place	2011 Guadalajara	4×100 m medley
Bronze medal – third place	2019 Lima	4×100 m medley
Bronze medal – third place	2019 Lima	4×100 m mixed medley
South American Games
Gold medal – first place	2010 Medellín	200 m freestyle
Gold medal – first place	2014 Santiago	200 m freestyle
Silver medal – second place	2010 Medellín	50 m backstroke
Silver medal – second place	2010 Medellín	100 m backstroke
Silver medal – second place	2014 Santiago	50 m freestyle
Silver medal – second place	2014 Santiago	100 m freestyle
Silver medal – second place	2014 Santiago	100 m backstroke
Silver medal – second place	2014 Santiago	4×100 m freestyle
Silver medal – second place	2014 Santiago	4×100 m medley
Bronze medal – third place	2010 Medellín	50 m freestyle

Federico Grabich (born 26 March 1990) is an Argentine competitive swimmer.

In August 2015, Grabich won the bronze medal at the World Championships, being the first medal for his country in a World Championship and the silver medal at the 2015 World Cup in Qatar.

At the 2012 Summer Olympics he finished 41st overall in the heats in the Men's 100 metre backstroke and failed to reach the semifinals. He finished in 35th place in the men's 50 metre freestyle. He competed at the 2016 Summer Olympics, in the 50, 100 and 200 m freestyle.

Grabish won the bronze medal at the 2011 Pan American Games and the gold and silver medal at the 2015 Pan American Games. At the 2015 Pan American Games, Grabich won the 100m Freestyle, setting a new Argentine record. He also won a silver medal in 200m, setting another Argentine record. At the South American Games he won ten medals (two of them were gold). At the 2015 Pan American Games, Grabich won the 100m Freestyle, setting a new Argentine record. He also won a silver medal in 200m, setting another Argentine record.
