= Alec Page =

Canadian swimmer

Personal information
- National team: Canada
- Born: November 8, 1993 (age 32) Victoria, British Columbia, Canada
- Height: 1.79 m (5 ft 10 in)
- Weight: 73 kg (161 lb)

Sport
- Sport: Swimming
- Strokes: Medley
- Club: Island Swimming
Medal record
Pan American Games
Bronze medal – third place	2015 Toronto	200 m butterfly
Bronze medal – third place	2015 Toronto	4×200 m freestyle

Alec Page (born November 8, 1993) is a Canadian former competitive swimmer who focuses on individual medley events. At the 2012 Summer Olympics in London, he finished 23rd overall in the preliminary heats of the men's 400-metre individual medley and failed to advance.
