= List of Pan American Games records in swimming =

Listed below is a complete list of the Pan American Games records in swimming, ratified by the Panam Sports (PASO).

== Men ==
Event	Time		Name	Nationality	Date	Meet	Location	Ref
50 m freestyle	21.58		César Cielo	Brazil	20 October 2011	2011 Pan American Games	Guadalajara, Mexico	
100 m freestyle	47.84		César Cielo	Brazil	16 October 2011	2011 Pan American Games	Guadalajara, Mexico	
200 m freestyle	1:46.42		João de Lucca	Brazil	15 July 2015	2015 Pan American Games	Toronto, Canada	
400 m freestyle	3:46.79		Guilherme Costa	Brazil	21 October 2023	2023 Pan American Games	Santiago, Chile	
800 m freestyle	7:53.01		Guilherme Costa	Brazil	23 October 2023	2023 Pan American Games	Santiago, Chile	
1500 m freestyle	15:06.40		Ryan Cochrane	Canada	18 July 2015	2015 Pan American Games	Toronto, Canada	
100m backstroke	53.12	r	Guilherme Guido	Brazil	18 July 2015	2015 Pan American Games	Toronto, Canada	
200m backstroke	1:56.58		Jack Aikins	United States	22 October 2023	2023 Pan American Games	Santiago, Chile	
100m breaststroke	59.21		Felipe França Silva	Brazil	17 July 2015	2015 Pan American Games	Toronto, Canada	
200m breaststroke	2:07.62		Will Licon	United States	8 August 2019	2019 Pan American Games	Lima, Peru	
100m butterfly	51.44	h	Luis Martínez	Guatemala	7 August 2019	2019 Pan American Games	Lima, Peru	
200m butterfly	1:55.01		Leonardo de Deus	Brazil	14 July 2015	2015 Pan American Games	Toronto, Canada	
200m individual medley	1:57.06		Henrique Rodrigues	Brazil	18 July 2015	2015 Pan American Games	Toronto, Canada	
400m individual medley	4:11.14		Thiago Pereira	Brazil	17 July 2007	2007 Pan American Games	Rio de Janeiro, Brazil	
4×100m freestyle relay	3:12.61		Breno Correia (48.82); Marcelo Chierighini (47.45); Bruno Fratus (48.18); Pedro Spajari (48.16)	Brazil	6 August 2019	2019 Pan American Games	Lima, Peru	
4×200m freestyle relay	7:07.53		Murilo Sartori (1:47.52); Breno Correia (1:47.60); Fernando Scheffer (1:45.90); Guilherme Costa (1:46.51)	Brazil	24 October 2023	2023 Pan American Games	Santiago, Chile	
4×100m medley relay	3:30.25		Daniel Carr (53.95); Nic Fink (58.57); Tom Shields (50.40); Nathan Adrian (47.33)	United States	10 August 2019	2019 Pan American Games	Lima, Peru	

Legend: # – Record awaiting ratification by PASO; WR – World record; AM – Americas record;
Records not set in finals: h – heat; sf – semifinal; r – relay 1st leg; rh – relay heat 1st leg; b – B final; † – en route to final mark; so – swim-off; tt – time trial

== Women ==
Event	Time		Name	Nationality	Date	Meet	Location	Ref
50m freestyle	24.31	h	Arianna Vanderpool-Wallace	Bahamas	17 July 2015	2015 Pan American Games	Toronto, Canada	
100m freestyle	53.64		Maggie Mac Neil	Canada	23 October 2023	2023 Pan American Games	Santiago, Chile	
200m freestyle	1:56.23		Allison Schmitt	United States	15 July 2015	2015 Pan American Games	Toronto, Canada	
400m freestyle	4:06.45		Paige Madden	United States	21 October 2023	2023 Pan American Games	Santiago, Chile	
800m freestyle	8:27.54		Sierra Schmidt	United States	18 July 2015	2015 Pan American Games	Toronto, Canada	
1500m freestyle	16:13.59		Rachel Stege	United States	25 October 2023	2023 Pan American Games	Santiago, Chile	
100m backstroke	59.02	r	Phoebe Bacon	United States	10 August 2019	2019 Pan American Games	Lima, Peru	
200m backstroke	2:08.03		Kennedy Noble	United States	22 October 2023	2023 Pan American Games	Santiago, Chile	
100m breaststroke	1:05.64	h	Katie Meili	United States	17 July 2015	2015 Pan American Games	Toronto, Canada	
200m breaststroke	2:21.40		Annie Lazor	United States	8 August 2019	2019 Pan American Games	Lima, Peru	
100m butterfly	56.94		Maggie Mac Neil	Canada	22 October 2023	2023 Pan American Games	Santiago, Chile	
200m butterfly	2:07.64		Kathleen Hersey	United States	21 July 2007	2007 Pan American Games	Rio de Janeiro, Brazil	
200m individual medley	2:09.04		Sydney Pickrem	Canada	25 October 2023	2023 Pan American Games	Santiago, Chile	
400m individual medley	4:35.46		Caitlin Leverenz	United States	16 July 2015	2015 Pan American Games	Toronto, Canada	
4×100m freestyle relay	3:36.80		Sandrine Mainville (54.43); Michelle Williams (54.42); Katerine Savard (54.53); Chantal van Landeghem (53.42)	Canada	14 July 2015	2015 Pan American Games	Toronto, Canada	
4×200m freestyle relay	7:54.32		Kiera Janzen (1:59.61); Allison Schmitt (1:55.98); Courtney Harnish (1:59.61); Gillian Ryan (1:59.12)	United States	16 July 2015	2015 Pan American Games	Toronto, Canada	
4×100m medley relay	3:56.53		Natalie Coughlin (59.05); Katie Meili (1:06.06); Kelsi Worrell (57.34); Allison Schmitt (54.08)	United States	18 July 2015	2015 Pan American Games	Toronto, Canada	

Legend: # – Record awaiting ratification by PASO; WR – World record; AM – Americas record;
Records not set in finals: h – heat; sf – semifinal; r – relay 1st leg; rh – relay heat 1st leg; b – B final; † – en route to final mark; so – swim-off; tt – time trial

== Mixed relay ==
Event	Time	Name	Club	Date	Meet	Location	Ref
4×100 m freestyle relay	3:23.78	Guilherme Caribé (48.26); Marcelo Chierighini (47.59); Ana Vieira (54.50); Stephanie Balduccini (53.43)	Brazil	22 October 2023	2023 Pan American Games	Santiago, Chile	
4×100 m medley relay	3:44.71	Kennedy Noble (59.72); Jacob Foster (1:00.09); Kelly Pash (57.51); Jonny Kulow (47.39)	United States	23 October 2023	2023 Pan American Games	Santiago, Chile	

Legend: # – Record awaiting ratification by PASO; WR – World record; AM – Americas record;
Records not set in finals: h – heat; so – swim-off

== See also ==
- Swimming at the Pan American Games
