= Toronto Pan Am Sports Centre =

Sports centre in Toronto, Ontario, Canada

- Centre sportif panaméricain de Toronto

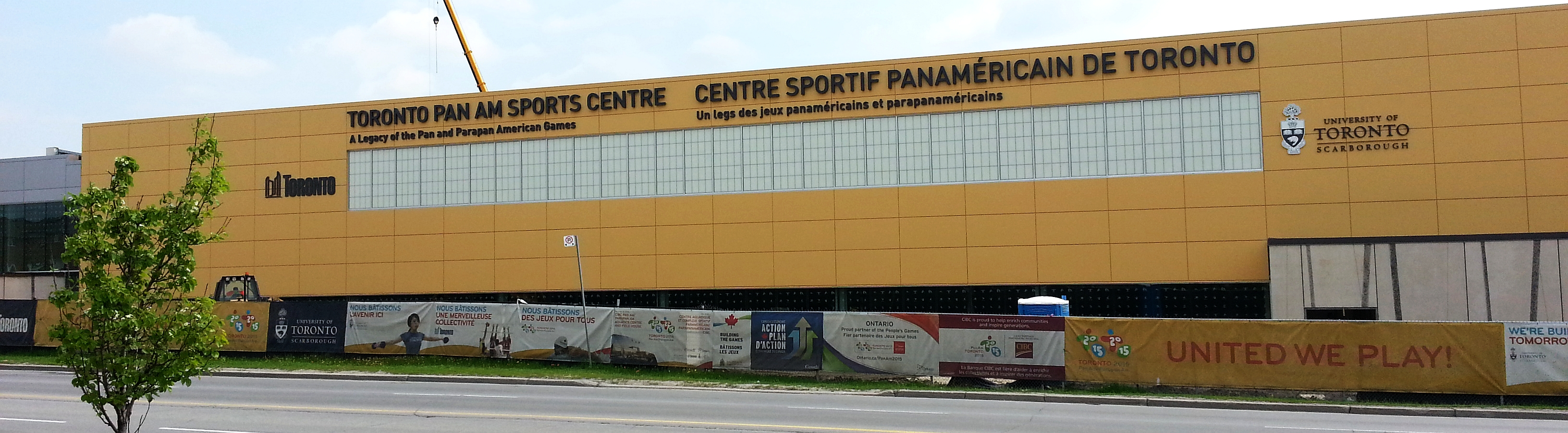
- The Toronto Pan Am Sports Centre under construction in May 2014

- Location in Toronto Location in Ontario Location in Canada
- Address: 875 Morningside Avenue
- Location: Toronto, Ontario, Canada
- Coordinates: 43°47′25.19″N 79°11′35.88″W
- Owner: City of Toronto; University of Toronto
- Capacity: Aquatics Centre - 6,000 (Pan/Parapan Games), 3,500 (legacy mode); Field House - 2,000
- Field size: 312,000 sq ft (29,000 m^{2}); Two 10-lane 50 metre pools Dive tank Four-court gymnasium 200 metre track

Construction
- Groundbreaking: September 27, 2012
- Opened: September 2, 2014
- Cost: $205 million
- Architect: NORR Limited
- General contractor: PCL Construction

Tenants
- Toronto Parks, Forestry and Recreation; University of Toronto Scarborough Athletics & Recreation; Canadian Sports Institute Ontario; 2015 Pan American Games; 2015 Parapan American Games; 2017 North American Indigenous Games; 2017 Invictus Games; Scarborough Shooting Stars (2022–present)

Website
- tpasc.ca

The Toronto Pan Am Sports Centre (TPASC; French: Centre sportif panaméricain de Toronto) is a sports complex in Toronto, Ontario, Canada. Co-owned by the City of Toronto and the University of Toronto, it is operated by TPASC Inc., with programming offered by both the university and Toronto Parks, Forestry & Recreation. It is located on the northern grounds of the university's Scarborough campus near the intersection of Highway 401 and Morningside Avenue.

Opened to the public on September 2, 2014, the complex consists of a 3,500-seat aquatics arena (6,000 during the Pan Am and Parapan Am Games) with two Olympic-size swimming pools and a diving well; and a 2,000-seat field house that includes four full-sized gymnasiums, a fitness centre, a climbing wall, and a 200-metre track. The centre hosted diving, fencing, swimming, synchronized swimming and modern pentathlon competitions during the 2015 Pan American Games. Funding for the Toronto Pan Am Sports Centre is the largest single investment in amateur sports in the history of Canada.

== History ==
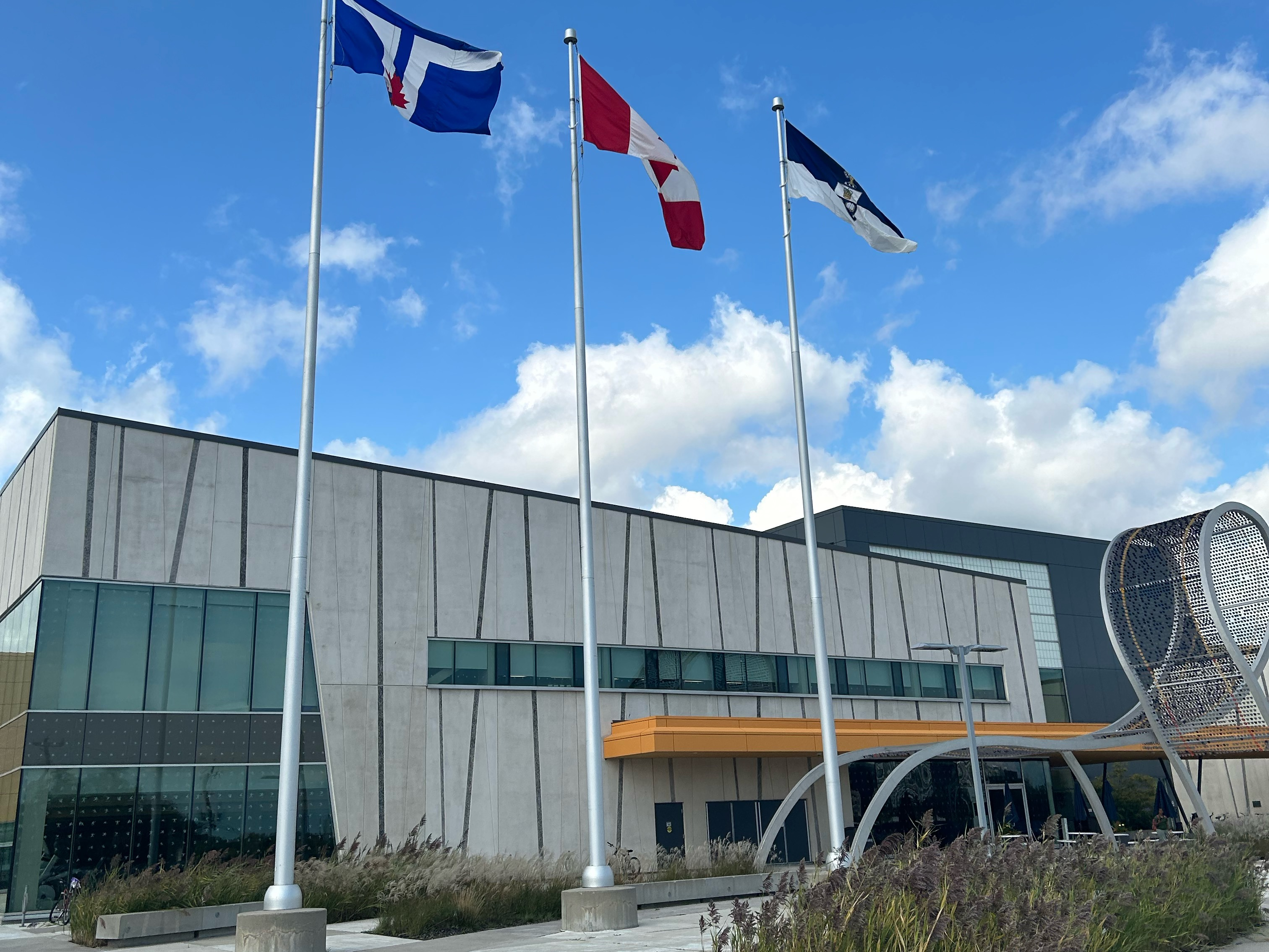
(From left to right) flags of Toronto, Canada, and the University of Toronto

The facility was funded by the Government of Canada, the Government of Ontario, the City of Toronto and the University of Toronto. In 2009, students at the University of Toronto Scarborough voted in favour of a 25-year levy which will contribute about $30 million to the facility. In 2011, the City of Toronto learned it had to contribute an extra $23 million for soil remediation on the former landfill. The whole facility cost about CA$205 million ($158 million to design and build it) which makes it the largest amount spent on amateur sport in Canada.

The official ground breaking for the facility was on 27 September 2012 and was attended by Toronto Mayor Rob Ford. The facility was announced then as the largest venue being built for the 2015 Pan American Games and represents the largest federal investment in amateur sport in Canadian history.

In addition to the 2015 Pan Am Games, the facility has hosted several other events for the North American Indigenous Games and the Invictus Games in 2017.

== Design ==
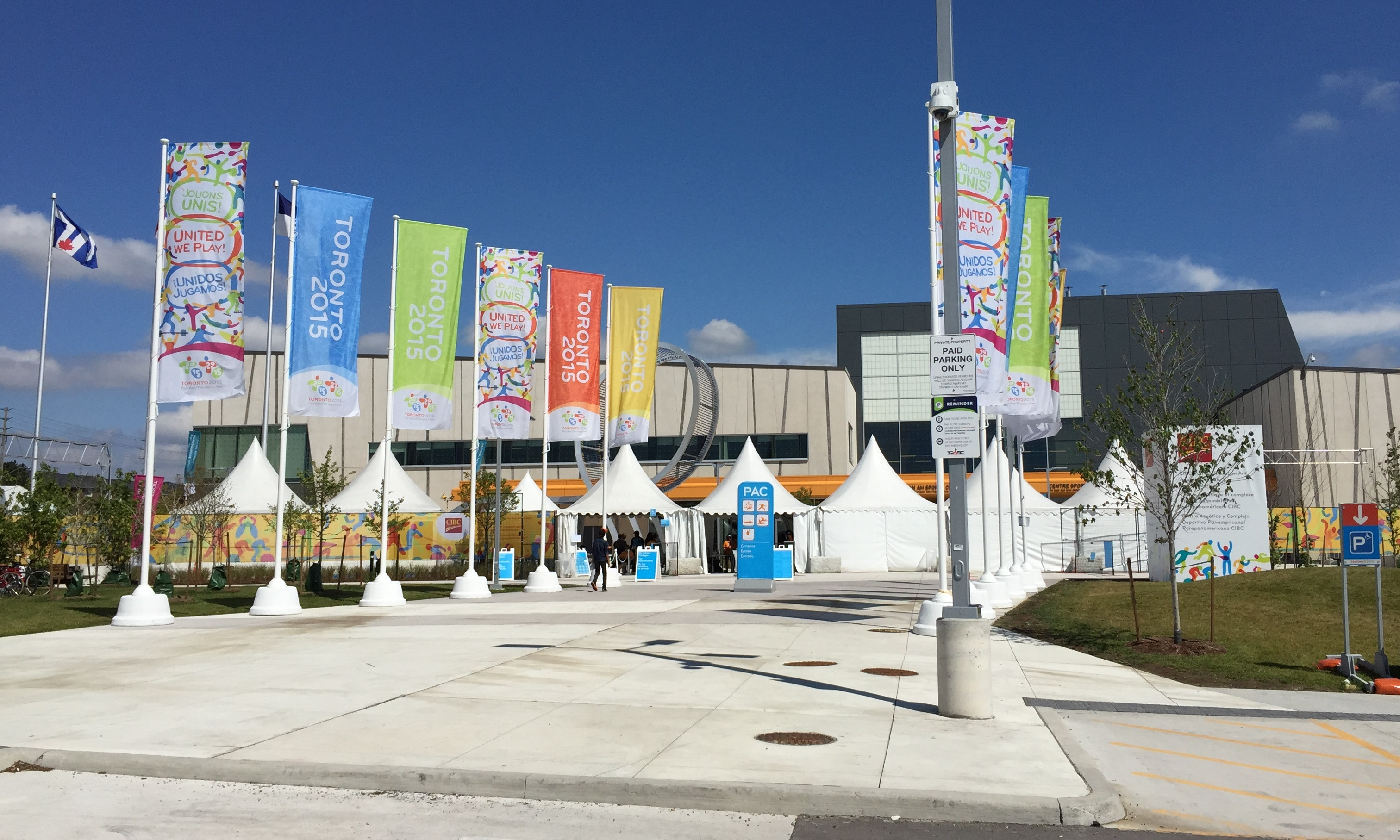
Entrance to the Toronto Pan Am Sports Centre during the 2015 Pan Am Games.

The architect of the facility is David Clusiau. PCL Construction and NORR Ltd., signed a contract to design, build and finance the facility. The facility was designed by Counsilman-Hunsaker, the company that designed the 1996 Summer Olympics aquatic centre. The facility has been awarded Leadership in Energy and Environmental Design (LEED) Gold label.

=== Aquatics centre ===
Aquatics centre
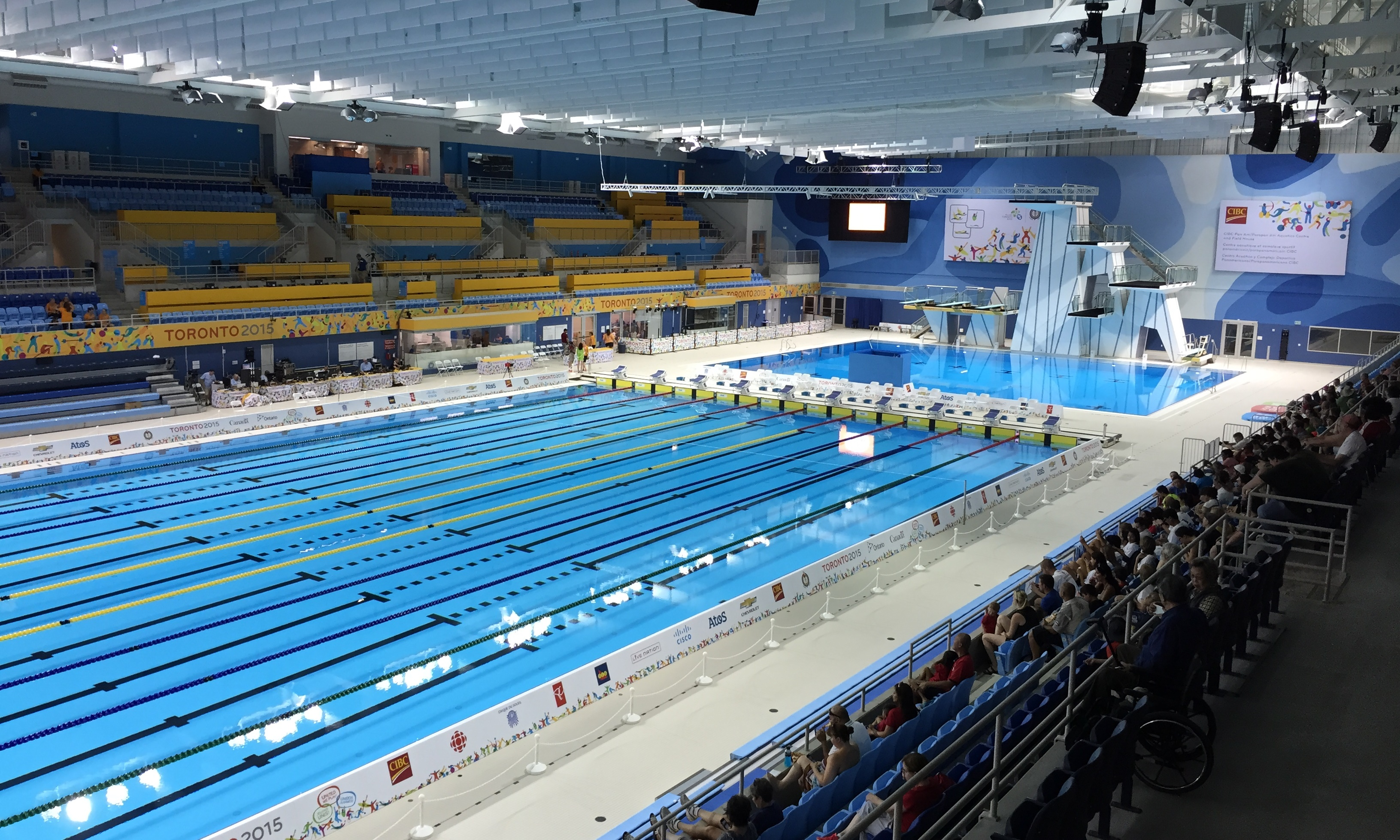
- The facility's aquatic centre during the 2015 Pan Am Games
- Interactive map of Aquatics centre
- Address: Toronto, Ontario, Canada
- Capacity: 6,000
- Pool size: 50 m × 25 m × 5 m (164 ft × 82 ft × 16 ft)

Construction
- Built: 2012-2014
- Opened: 2 September 2014
- Cost: $205 million
- Architect: NORR Limited

Tenant
- Toronto Varsity Blues

The centre has three pools: the dive pool (25m), the competition pool (50m) and the training pool (50m). The competition pool has 3,500 seats. The facility doubles the number of Olympic pools in Toronto. The dive pool has three diving platform heights (3, 7.5 and 10 metres) and a dry diving training centre. The centre is the only aquatics facility in the area that meets international competition standards and the first facility with a warm-up pool. The competition pool is regarded as one of the fastest pools in the world. Public lane swim and leisure swim typically takes place in the training pool, while team practice and competition takes place in the competition pool. Ticket prices for lane swim are the same as other City pools.

=== Field house ===
The field house is adjacent to the aquatics centre and seats 2,000 people. The field house hosted fencing and modern pentathlon (fencing portion) events during the 2015 Games. The field house consists of three gymnasiums, a 200-metre indoor running facility, racquet sports courts and a centre for fitness which the entire school community can use. Moreover, the facility contains weightlifting equipment and a training area. It is also the home of the Canadian Sports Institute Ontario (CSIO). Starting in 2022, the Field House hosts home games for the Scarborough Shooting Stars of the Canadian Elite Basketball League.

=== Other facilities ===
The centre also has a climbing wall, a fitness centre, retail store, food and beverage, a 200m walking track, and offices currently used by Swim Ontario, North York Aquatic Club, Scarborough Swim Club, Whitby Swimming and others.

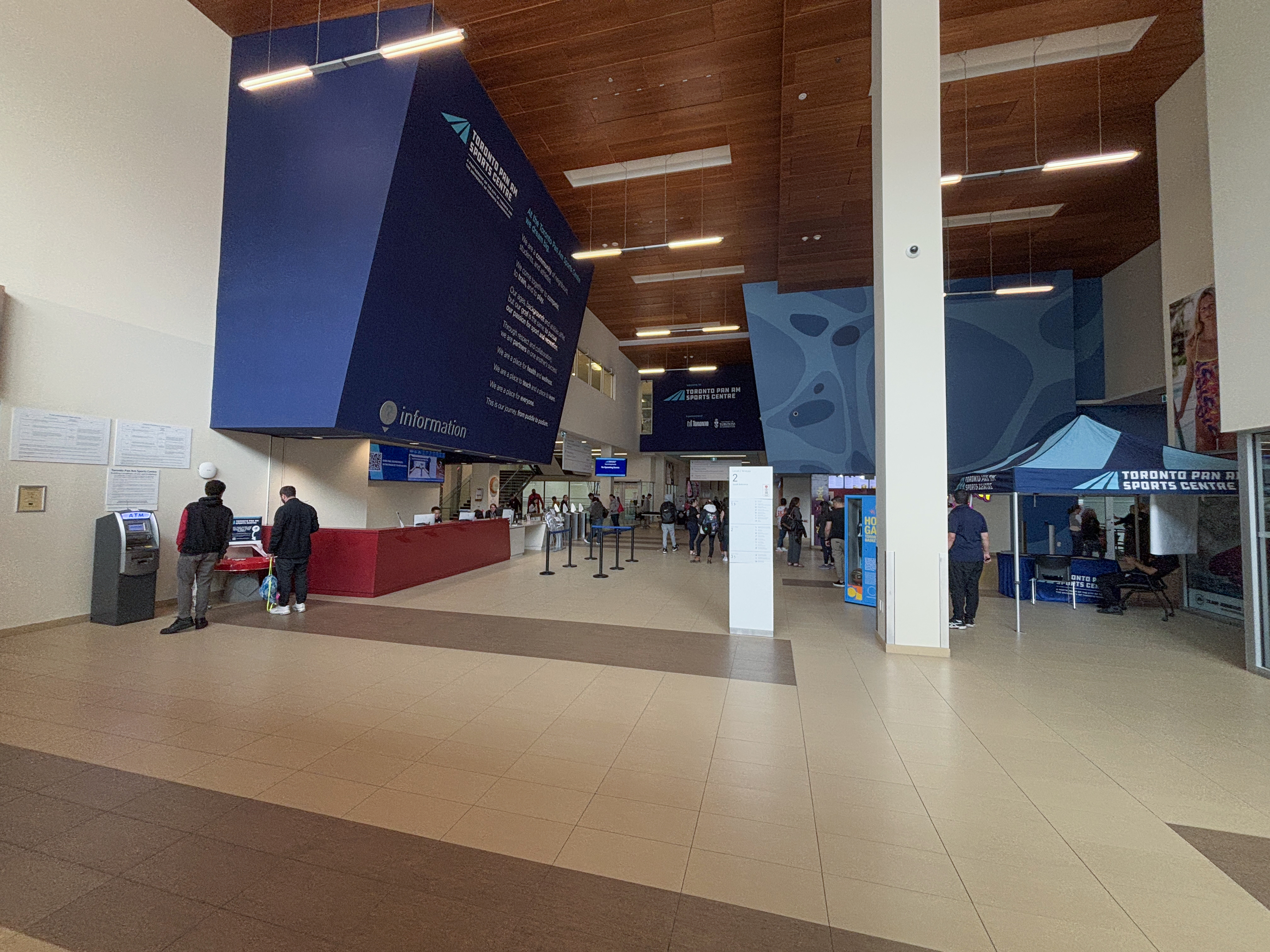
Lobby

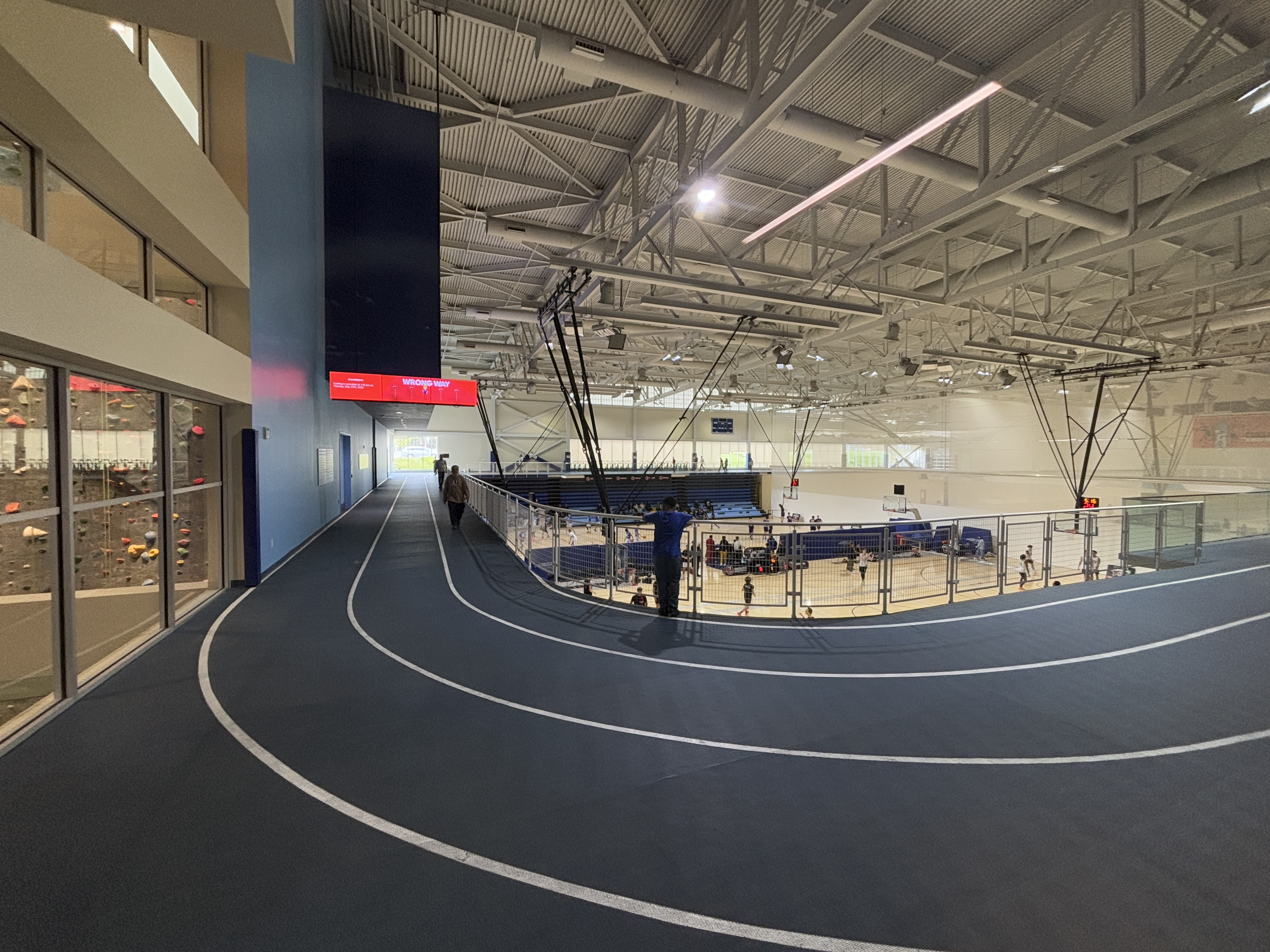
Indoor track and arena

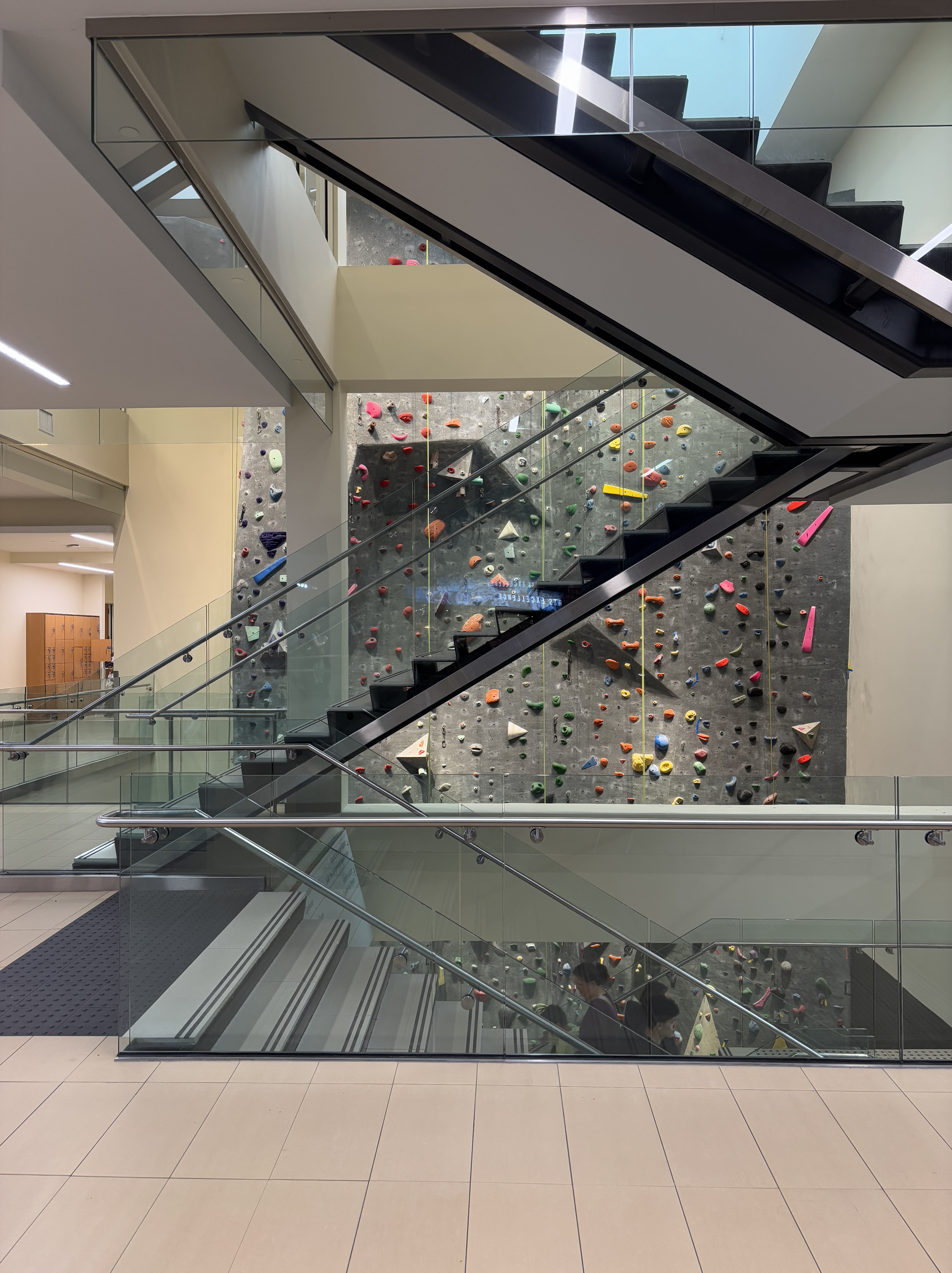
Climbing wall

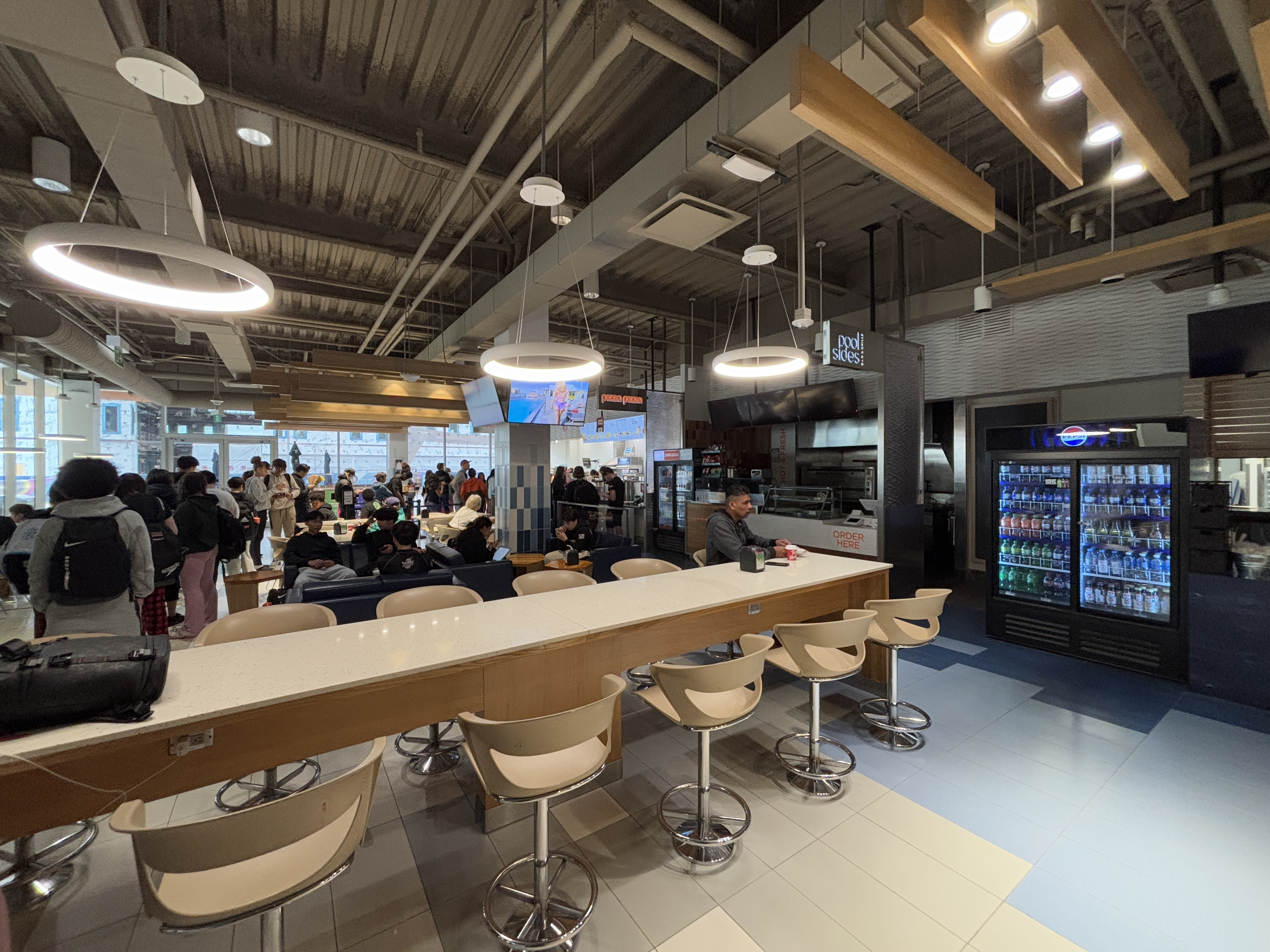
Food Court

== Major competitions hosted ==
Year	Date	Event	Level
2015	February 6–8	Winter National Canadian Diving Championships	National
2015	April 1–4	Canadian Swimming Trials	National
2015	July 16–19	2015 Pan American Games	International
2015	August 7–15	2015 Parapan American Games	International
2016	April 5–10	Canadian Olympic and Paralympic Swimming Trials	National
2017	July 19–21	2017 North American Indigenous Games	Continental
2017	September 28–29	2017 Invictus Games	International
2019	April 3–7	Canadian Swimming Trials	National
2020	March 30-April 5	Canadian Olympic and Paralympic Swimming Trials	National
2022	October 28-30	FINA Swimming World Cup	International
2023	March 28-April 2	Canadian Swimming Trials	National
2025	October 23–25	World Aquatics Swimming World Cup	International
