= Swimming at the 2014 South American Games – Women's 4 × 200 metre freestyle relay =

Women's 4 x 200 metre freestyle relay at the 2014 South American Games
- Venue: Estadio Nacional
- Dates: March 7, 2014 (heats & finals)
- Winning time: 8:18.34

Medalists
gold medal	Larissa Oliveira, Jéssica Cavalheiro, Carolina Bilich and Manuella Lyrio	Brazil
silver medal	Wendy Crespo, Erika Torrellas, Yennifer Mendoza and Andreina Pinto	Venezuela
bronze medal	Carolina Colorado Henao, María Álvarez, María Muñoz and Jessica Camposano	Colombia

The women's 4 x 200 metre freestyle relay competition at the 2014 South American Games took place on March 7 at the Estadio Nacional. The last champion was Brazil.

This race consisted of sixteen lengths of the pool. Each of the four swimmers completed four lengths of the pool. The first swimmer had to touch the wall before the second could leave the starting block.

== Records ==
Prior to this competition, the existing world and Pan Pacific records were as follows:

World record	China (CHN); Yang Yu (1:55.47); Zhu Qianwei (1:55.79); Liu Jing (1:56.09); Pang Jiaying (1:54.73)	7:42.08	Rome, Italy	July 30, 2009
South American Games record	Brazil (BRA); Tatiana Lemos (2:07.25); Daynara de Paula (2:08.14); Sarah Correa (2:07.49); Joanna Maranhão (2:01.97)	8:24.85	Medellín, Colombia	March 26, 2010

== Results ==
All times are in minutes and seconds.

KEY:	q	Fastest non-qualifiers	Q	Qualified	CR	Championships record	NR	National record	PB	Personal best	SB	Seasonal best

=== Heats ===
Heats weren't performed, as only seven teams had entered.

=== Final ===
The final was held on March 7, at 20:39.

Rank	Lane	Name	Nationality	Time	Notes
1st place, gold medalist(s)	4	Larissa Oliveira (2:02.52); Jéssica Cavalheiro (2:03.73); Carolina Bilich (2:07.18); Manuella Lyrio (2:04.91)	Brazil	8:18.34	CR
2nd place, silver medalist(s)	5	Wendy Rodriguez Crespo (2:05.72); Erika Torrellas (2:08.93); Yennifer Marquez Mendoza (2:08.27); Andreina Pinto (2:00.19)	Venezuela	8:23.11	
3rd place, bronze medalist(s)	1	Carolina Colorado Henao (2:04.18); María Álvarez (2:07.90); María Muñoz (2:07.48); Jessica Camposano (2:04.21)	Colombia	8:23.77	NR
4	3	Maria Diaz (2:09.67); Andrea Berrino (2:05.74); Virginia Bardach (2:08.21); Cecilia Biagioli (2:03.57)	Argentina	8:27.09	
5	6	Courtney Schultz Donlan (2:10.96); Isabel Riquelme Díaz (2:10.76); Katarina Blanco Rosbotham (2:12.31); Kristel Köbrich (2:05.52)	Chile	8:39.55	
6	2	Jessica Cattaneo Paulista (2:09.55); Domenica Vallejo Jauslin (2:10.94); Daniela Miyahara Coello (2:11.84); Andrea Cedrón (2:11.94)	Peru	8:44.27	
7	7	Sharon Bravo Rivas (2:09.56); Adriana Parra Chiriboga (2:17.84); Maria Augusta Serrano (2:14.15); Nicole Marmol Gilbert (2:13.36)	Ecuador	8:54.91	
