= Swimming at the 2014 South American Games – Women's 400 metre freestyle =

Women's 400 metre freestyle at the 2014 South American Games
- Venue: Estadio Nacional
- Dates: March 7, 2014 (heats & finals)
- Competitors: 11 from 8 nations
- Winning time: 4:10.71

Medalists
gold medal	Andreina Pinto	Venezuela
silver medal	Kristel Köbrich	Chile
bronze medal	Manuella Lyrio	Brazil

The women's 400 metre freestyle competition at the 2014 South American Games took place on March 7 at the Estadio Nacional. The last champion was Joanna Maranhão of Brazil.

This race consisted of eight lengths of the pool, with all eight being in the freestyle stroke.

== Records ==
Prior to this competition, the existing world and Pan Pacific records were as follows:

World record	Federica Pellegrini (ITA)	3:59.15	Rome, Italy	July 26, 2009
South American Games record	Cecilia Biagioli (ARG)	4:13.63	Buenos Aires, Argentina	November 15, 2006

== Results ==
All times are in minutes and seconds.

KEY:	q	Fastest non-qualifiers	Q	Qualified	CR	Championships record	NR	National record	PB	Personal best	SB	Seasonal best

=== Heats ===
The first round was held on March 7, at 11:40.

Rank	Heat	Lane	Name	Nationality	Time	Notes
1	2	4	Andreina Pinto	Venezuela	4:17.06	Q
2	1	4	Kristel Köbrich	Chile	4:20.22	Q
3	1	5	Manuella Lyrio	Brazil	4:25.41	Q
4	2	5	Carolina Bilich	Brazil	4:25.56	Q
5	1	6	Annagrazia Bonsanti	Venezuela	4:26.00	Q
6	1	3	María Álvarez	Colombia	4:26.17	Q
7	2	3	Andrea Cedrón	Peru	4:26.59	Q
8	2	2	Maria Serrano	Ecuador	4:32.91	Q
9	2	6	Jessica Cattaneo Paulista	Peru	4:42.81	
10	1	2	Laura Orihuela Gianotti	Paraguay	4:44.88	
11	2	7	Alondra Castillo Sulca	Bolivia	4:58.74	

=== Final ===
The final was held on March 7, at 19:10.

Rank	Lane	Name	Nationality	Time	Notes
1st place, gold medalist(s)	4	Andreina Pinto	Venezuela	4:10.71	CR
2nd place, silver medalist(s)	5	Kristel Köbrich	Chile	4:15.15	
3rd place, bronze medalist(s)	3	Manuella Lyrio	Brazil	4:20.86	
4	6	Carolina Bilich	Brazil	4:23.61	
5	1	Andrea Cedrón	Peru	4:23.96	
6	7	María Álvarez	Colombia	4:24.31	
7	2	Annagrazia Bonsanti	Venezuela	4:24.34	
8	8	Maria Serrano	Ecuador	4:32.85	
