= Swimming at the 2014 South American Games – Women's 800 metre freestyle =

Women's 800 metre freestyle at the 2014 South American Games
- Venue: Estadio Nacional
- Dates: March 8, 2014 (heats & finals)
- Competitors: 13 from 9 nations
- Winning time: 8:35.41

Medalists
gold medal	Andreina Pinto	Venezuela
silver medal	Kristel Köbrich	Chile
bronze medal	Cecilia Biagioli	Argentina

The women's 800 metre freestyle competition at the 2014 South American Games took place on March 8 at the Estadio Nacional. The last champion was Andreina Pinto of Venezuela.

This event was a timed-final where each swimmer swam just once. The top 8 seeded swimmers swam in the evening, and the remaining swimmers swam in the morning session.

== Records ==
Prior to this competition, the existing world and Pan Pacific records were as follows:

World record	Katie Ledecky (USA)	8:13.86	Barcelona, Spain	August 3, 2013
South American Games record	Andreina Pinto (VEN)	8:40.05	Medellín, Colombia	March 27, 2010

== Results ==
All times are in minutes and seconds.

KEY:	q	Fastest non-qualifiers	Q	Qualified	CR	Championships record	NR	National record	PB	Personal best	SB	Seasonal best

The first round was held on March 8, at 10:30, and the final was held on March 8, at 18:30.

Rank	Heat	Lane	Name	Nationality	Time	Notes
1st place, gold medalist(s)	2	4	Andreina Pinto	Venezuela	8:35.41	CR
2nd place, silver medalist(s)	2	5	Kristel Köbrich	Chile	8:37.19	
3rd place, bronze medalist(s)	2	6	Cecilia Biagioli	Argentina	8:45.68	
4	2	3	Samantha Arevalo	Ecuador	8:50.30	
5	1	4	Julia Arino	Argentina	9:02.79	
6	2	2	Carolina Bilich	Brazil	9:05.85	
7	2	1	Annagrazia Bonsanti	Venezuela	9:07.77	
8	2	7	Júlia Gerotto	Brazil	9:07.92	
9	1	3	Maria Serrano	Ecuador	9:13.18	
10	1	5	Daniela Miyahara Coello	Peru	9:16.69	
11	2	8	María Álvarez	Colombia	9:17.56	
12	1	2	Alondra Castillo Sulca	Bolivia	10:06.23	
12	1	6	Paloma Riveras Ortiz	Paraguay	10:06.23	
