= Swimming at the 2014 South American Games – Women's 1500 metre freestyle =

Women's 1500 metre freestyle at the 2014 South American Games
- Venue: Estadio Nacional
- Dates: March 10, 2014 (heats & finals)
- Competitors: 9 from 6 nations
- Winning time: 16:15.89

Medalists
gold medal	Kristel Köbrich	Chile
silver medal	Samantha Arevalo	Ecuador
bronze medal	Cecilia Biagioli	Argentina

The women's 1500 metre freestyle competition at the 2014 South American Games took place on March 10 at the Estadio Nacional. The last champion was Kristel Köbrich of Chile.

This event was a timed-final where each swimmer swam just once. The top 8 seeded swimmers swam in the evening, and the remaining swimmers swam in the morning session.

== Records ==
Prior to this competition, the existing world and Pan Pacific records were as follows:

World record	Katie Ledecky (USA)	15:36.53	Barcelona, Spain	July 30, 2013
South American Games record	Kristel Köbrich (CHI)	16:26.15	Medellín, Colombia	March 29, 2010

== Results ==
All times are in minutes and seconds.

KEY:	q	Fastest non-qualifiers	Q	Qualified	CR	Championships record	NR	National record	PB	Personal best	SB	Seasonal best

The first round was held on March 10, at 11:36, and the final was held on March 10, at 19:33.

Rank	Heat	Lane	Name	Nationality	Time	Notes
1st place, gold medalist(s)	2	4	Kristel Köbrich	Chile	16:15.89	CR
2nd place, silver medalist(s)	2	2	Samantha Arevalo	Ecuador	16:38.05	NR
3rd place, bronze medalist(s)	2	3	Cecilia Biagioli	Argentina	16:38.54	
4	2	8	Júlia Gerotto	Brazil	17:09.99	
5	2	7	Julia Arino	Argentina	17:14.92	
6	2	1	Annagrazia Bonsanti	Venezuela	17:15.89	
7	2	6	Carolina Bilich	Brazil	17:25.64	
8	1	4	Maria Serrano	Ecuador	17:26.37	
9	1	5	Daniela Miyahara Coello	Peru	17:44.60	
-	2	5	Andreina Pinto	Venezuela	DNS	
