= Swimming at the 2014 South American Games – Women's 10 km open water =

Women's 10 km open water swim at the 2014 South American Games
- Dates: March 16, 2014
- Competitors: 14 from 9 nations
- Winning time: 1:58:06

Medalists
gold medal	Kristel Köbrich	Chile
silver medal	Cecilia Biagioli	Argentina
bronze medal	Ana Marcela Cunha	Brazil

The women's 10 km open water swim competition at the 2014 South American Games took place on March 16 at the C.A.R. Laguna Curauma.

== Results ==
The race was started at 10:00.

Rank	Swimmer	Nationality	Time
1st place, gold medalist(s)	Kristel Köbrich	Chile	1:58:06
2nd place, silver medalist(s)	Cecilia Biagioli	Argentina	1:59:35
3rd place, bronze medalist(s)	Ana Marcela Cunha	Brazil	2:00:15
4	Samantha Arévalo	Ecuador	2:04:25
5	Paola Sierra	Venezuela	2:04:56
6	Julia Arino	Argentina	2:05:28
7	Nataly Caldas	Ecuador	2:05:41
8	Liliana Hernandez	Venezuela	2:12:38
9	Betina Lorscheitter	Brazil	2:13:56
10	Mahina Dannenberg	Chile	2:16:18
11	Jacqueline Delgado	Peru	2:23:27
12	Paola Sapia	Uruguay	2:27:28
13	Maria Garcete	Paraguay	2:28:02
14	Micaela Vargas	Bolivia	2:28:05
