= Swimming at the 2014 South American Games – Women's 100 metre backstroke =

Women's 100 metre backstroke at the 2014 South American Games
- Venue: Estadio Nacional
- Dates: March 10, 2014 (heats & finals)
- Competitors: 14 from 9 nations
- Winning time: 1:02.56

Medalists
gold medal	Carolina Colorado Henao	Colombia
silver medal	Etiene Medeiros	Brazil
bronze medal	Natalia de Luccas	Brazil

The women's 100 metre backstroke competition at the 2014 South American Games took place on March 10 at the Estadio Nacional. The last champion was Fabíola Molina of Brazil.

This race consisted of two lengths of the pool, all in backstroke.

== Records ==
Prior to this competition, the existing world and Pan Pacific records were as follows:

World record	Gemma Spofforth (GBR)	58.12	Rome, Italy	July 28, 2009
South American Games record	Fabíola Molina (BRA)	1:01.65	Medellín, Colombia	March 29, 2010

== Results ==
All times are in minutes and seconds.

KEY:	q	Fastest non-qualifiers	Q	Qualified	CR	Championships record	NR	National record	PB	Personal best	SB	Seasonal best

=== Heats ===
The first round was held on March 10, at 11:48.

Rank	Heat	Lane	Name	Nationality	Time	Notes
1	1	5	Andrea Berrino	Argentina	1:03.00	Q
2	2	4	Carolina Colorado Henao	Colombia	1:03.39	Q
3	2	5	Natalia de Luccas	Brazil	1:04.02	Q
4	1	4	Etiene Medeiros	Brazil	1:04.88	Q
5	2	6	Jeserik Pinto Sequera	Venezuela	1:05.34	Q
6	1	3	Erika Torrellas	Venezuela	1:05.47	Q
7	2	3	Florencia Perotti	Argentina	1:05.60	Q
8	1	2	Maria Arrua Villagra	Paraguay	1:07.06	Q
9	1	6	Sharon Bravo Rivas	Ecuador	1:07.38	
10	1	1	Estefanía Urzúa Morales	Chile	1:08.15	NR
11	2	2	Nicole Marmol Gilbert	Ecuador	1:08.33	
12	2	7	Domenica Vallejo Jauslin	Peru	1:08.41	
13	2	1	Brienne Renfurm	Suriname	1:09.11	
14	1	7	Marianne Spuhr Ramírez	Chile	1:09.61	

=== Final ===
The final was held on March 10, at 20:16.

Rank	Lane	Name	Nationality	Time	Notes
1st place, gold medalist(s)	5	Carolina Colorado Henao	Colombia	1:02.56	
2nd place, silver medalist(s)	6	Etiene Medeiros	Brazil	1:02.85	
3rd place, bronze medalist(s)	3	Natalia de Luccas	Brazil	1:02.92	
4	4	Andrea Berrino	Argentina	1:03.05	
5	1	Florencia Perotti	Argentina	1:05.05	
6	2	Jeserik Pinto Sequera	Venezuela	1:05.22	
7	7	Erika Torrellas	Venezuela	1:05.36	
8	8	Maria Arrua Villagra	Paraguay	1:07.86	
