= Swimming at the 2014 South American Games – Women's 200 metre backstroke =

Women's 200 metre backstroke at the 2014 South American Games
- Venue: Estadio Nacional
- Dates: March 8, 2014 (heats & finals)
- Competitors: 11 from 7 nations
- Winning time: 2:14.42

Medalists
gold medal	Carolina Colorado Henao	Colombia
silver medal	Andrea Berrino	Argentina
bronze medal	Natalia de Luccas	Brazil

The women's 200 metre backstroke competition at the 2014 South American Games took place on March 8 at the Estadio Nacional. The last champion was Fernanda Alvarenga of Brazil.

This race consisted of four lengths of the pool, all in backstroke.

== Records ==
Prior to this competition, the existing world and Pan Pacific records were as follows:

World record	Missy Franklin (USA)	2:04.06	London, Great Britain	August 3, 2012
South American Games record	Georgina Bardach (ARG)	2:17.82	Buenos Aires, Argentina	November 16, 2006

== Results ==
All times are in minutes and seconds.

KEY:	q	Fastest non-qualifiers	Q	Qualified	CR	Championships record	NR	National record	PB	Personal best	SB	Seasonal best

=== Heats ===
The first round was held on March 8, at 10:50.

Rank	Heat	Lane	Name	Nationality	Time	Notes
1	2	4	Carolina Colorado Henao	Colombia	2:20.00	Q
2	1	4	Natalia de Luccas	Brazil	2:21.90	Q
3	2	5	Andrea Berrino	Argentina	2:22.68	Q
4	1	5	Florencia Perotti	Argentina	2:24.21	Q
5	1	2	Estefanía Urzúa Morales	Chile	2:26.03	Q
6	2	3	Nathalia Almeida	Brazil	2:26.17	Q
7	2	2	Sharon Bravo Rivas	Ecuador	2:27.90	Q
8	1	3	Domenica Vallejo Jauslin	Peru	2:28.23	Q
9	1	6	Marianne Spuhr Ramírez	Chile	2:29.13	
10	2	6	Nicole Marmol Gilbert	Ecuador	2:30.96	
11	2	7	Brienne Renfurm	Suriname	2:38.27	

=== Final ===
The final was held on March 8, at 19:05.

Rank	Lane	Name	Nationality	Time	Notes
1st place, gold medalist(s)	4	Carolina Colorado Henao	Colombia	2:14.42	CR
2nd place, silver medalist(s)	3	Andrea Berrino	Argentina	2:15.52	
3rd place, bronze medalist(s)	5	Natalia de Luccas	Brazil	2:17.96	
4	6	Florencia Perotti	Argentina	2:18.96	
5	7	Nathalia Almeida	Brazil	2:25.13	
6	8	Domenica Vallejo Jauslin	Peru	2:25.15	
7	1	Sharon Bravo Rivas	Ecuador	2:25.46	
8	2	Estefanía Urzúa Morales	Chile	2:26.37	
