= Etiene Medeiros =

Brazilian swimmer (born 1991)

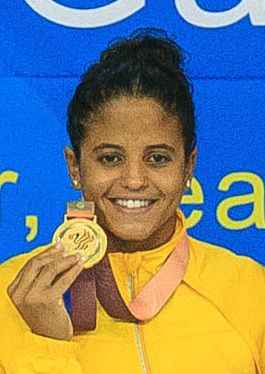
- Etiene Medeiros in 2015

Personal information
- Full name: Etiene Pires de Medeiros
- National team: Brazil
- Born: 24 May 1991 (age 35) Recife, Pernambuco, Brazil
- Height: 1.68 m (5 ft 6 in)
- Weight: 80 kg (176 lb)

Sport
- Sport: Swimming
- Strokes: Backstroke, freestyle
Medal record
Women's swimming
Representing Brazil
World Championships (LC)
Gold medal – first place	2017 Budapest	50 m backstroke
Silver medal – second place	2015 Kazan	50 m backstroke
Silver medal – second place	2019 Gwangju	50 m backstroke
World Championships (SC)
Gold medal – first place	2014 Doha	50 m backstroke
Gold medal – first place	2014 Doha	4×50 m mixed medley
Gold medal – first place	2016 Windsor	50 m backstroke
Silver medal – second place	2016 Windsor	4×50 m mixed medley
Bronze medal – third place	2014 Doha	4×50 m mixed freestyle
Bronze medal – third place	2018 Hangzhou	50 m freestyle
Pan American Games
Gold medal – first place	2015 Toronto	100 m backstroke
Gold medal – first place	2019 Lima	50 m freestyle
Silver medal – second place	2015 Toronto	50 m freestyle
Silver medal – second place	2019 Lima	4×100 m freestyle
Silver medal – second place	2019 Lima	4×100 m mixed freestyle
Bronze medal – third place	2015 Toronto	4×100 m freestyle
Bronze medal – third place	2015 Toronto	4×100 m medley
Bronze medal – third place	2019 Lima	100 m backstroke
Bronze medal – third place	2019 Lima	4×100 m medley
South American Games
Gold medal – first place	2014 Santiago	4×100 m medley
Silver medal – second place	2014 Santiago	100 m backstroke
Bronze medal – third place	2014 Santiago	100 m butterfly
South American Championships
Gold medal – first place	2008 São Paulo	4×100 m freestyle
Gold medal – first place	2012 Belém	50 m backstroke
Gold medal – first place	2014 Mar del Plata	50 m backstroke
Gold medal – first place	2014 Mar del Plata	100 m backstroke
Gold medal – first place	2014 Mar del Plata	4×100 m freestyle
Gold medal – first place	2014 Mar del Plata	4×100 m medley
Gold medal – first place	2014 Mar del Plata	4×100 m mixed medley
Gold medal – first place	2016 Asunción	50 m freestyle
Gold medal – first place	2016 Asunción	100 m freestyle
Gold medal – first place	2016 Asunción	100 m backstroke
Gold medal – first place	2016 Asunción	4×100 m freestyle
Silver medal – second place	2008 São Paulo	50 m backstroke
Silver medal – second place	2014 Mar del Plata	100 m butterfly
Silver medal – second place	2016 Asunción	50 m backstroke
Bronze medal – third place	2012 Belém	100 m backstroke
World Junior Championships
Silver medal – second place	2008 Monterrey	50 m backstroke

Etiene Pires de Medeiros (born 24 May 1991) is a Brazilian competitive swimmer who participates in backstroke and freestyle events. Widely regarded as the best Brazilian woman swimmer of all time, Medeiros was the first Brazilian to win an individual gold medal in a World Championship (long and short course) and Pan American Games, and the first to be a world record-holder in the modern era (only Maria Lenk in 1939 had accomplished this feat)

== International career ==
=== 2008–12 ===
At 17 years old, Etiene Medeiros won the silver medal in the 50-metre backstroke at the 2008 FINA Youth World Swimming Championships in Monterrey.

At the 2009 World Aquatics Championships in Rome, she finished 21st in the 50-metre backstroke.

Medeiros was at the 2010 FINA World Swimming Championships (25 m) in Dubai, where she finished 17th in the 50-metre backstroke and 30th in the 100-metre backstroke.

She joined the national delegation which attended the 2011 World Aquatics Championships in Shanghai, China, winning the vacancy after the positive doping of Fabiola Molina. Etiene finished 43rd in the 100-metre backstroke with a time of 1:05.18. She also swam the 50-metre backstroke, where she finished 25th and in the 4×100-metre medley, where she finished 17th.

At the 2011 Pan American Games, Etiene finished 10th in the 100-metre backstroke heats and did not go to the final.

She was at the 2012 FINA World Swimming Championships (25 m) in Istanbul, where she finished 10th in the 50-metre backstroke and 28th in the 100-metre backstroke.

=== 2013–16 ===
In January 2013, she moved to São Paulo and started work with Coach Fernando Vanzella in club SESI-SP. In April 2013, she won the Maria Lenk Trophy in Brazil with a time of 27.88 seconds in the 50-metre backstroke, the best mark of her life and one of the best times of the year in the proof.

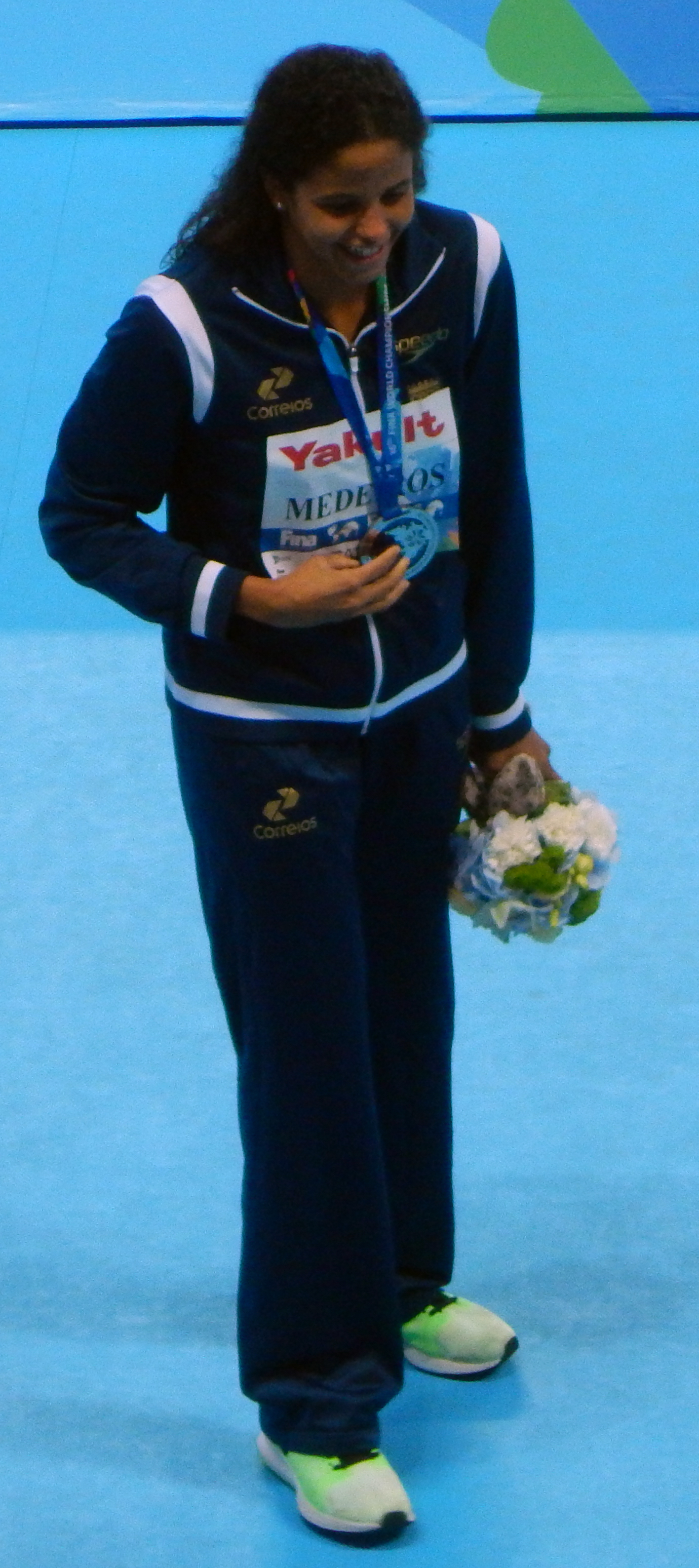
Medeiros in Kazan 2015

At the 2013 World Aquatics Championships in Barcelona, she finished 21st in the 100-metre backstroke. In the 50-metre backstroke, qualified for the final with the fifth fastest time, 27.89 seconds, one hundredth of her personal best. In the final, she finished in 4th place, with a time of 27.83 seconds, her personal best, getting the best placement of a Brazilian woman in the World Championships. She also finished 12th in the 4×100-metre medley, along with Daynara de Paula, Larissa Oliveira and Beatriz Travalon.

At the 2014 Pan Pacific Swimming Championships in Gold Coast, Queensland, she finished 5th in the 4x100-metre freestyle relay, along with Graciele Herrmann, Daynara de Paula, and Alessandra Marchioro; 5th in the 4x100-metre medley relay, along with Graciele Herrmann, Ana Carla Carvalho and Daynara de Paula; 6th in the 50-metre freestyle; 7th in the 100-metre butterfly; and 11th in the 100-metre backstroke.

On 3 September 2014, participating in the José Finkel Trophy (short course competition) in Guaratinguetá, Medeiros broke three South American records: in the 50-metre freestyle with a time of 24.15, in the 50-metre backstroke with a time of 26.41, and in the 100-metre backstroke with a time of 57.53.

On 7 December 2014, participating in the 2014 FINA World Swimming Championships (25 m) in Doha, Qatar, Medeiros broke the world record in the 50-metre backstroke with a time of 25.67. Medeiros was the first woman in Brazil to get an individual medal in World Championships, and the first to win a gold medal. Medeiros won 3 medals in the competition: the gold in the Women's 50 metre backstroke, another gold in the 4 × 50 metre mixed medley relay (along with Felipe França, Nicholas Santos and Larissa Oliveira), and a bronze medal in the 4 × 50 metre mixed freestyle relay (along with Cesar Cielo, João de Lucca, and Larissa Oliveira). On 3 December, in the 4 × 50 metre mixed medley relay, Medeiros opened the final with a time of 25.83. Brazil won the race beating the South American record with a time of 1:37.26, only 0.09 seconds from beating USA's world record (1:37.17). On 6 December, in the 4 × 50 metre mixed freestyle relay, Brazil broke the South American record with a time of 1:29.17, only four hundredths slower than Russia, which won the silver medal. In the 50-metre backstroke, Medeiros broke the Americas' record in the semifinal with a time of 25.99 and the World record in the final with a time of 25.67. Medeiros also broke two times the South American record in the 100 metre backstroke, with a time of 57.36 at heats and 57.13 in the semifinals, finishing in 7th place in the final; and two times in Women's 4 × 50 metre medley relay, with a time of 1:47.20 at heats and 1:46.47 in the final, finishing in 5th place.

At the Brazilian Open, in Rio de Janeiro, she broke the Americas' record in the 50-metre backstroke with a time of 27.37. She also broke the South American record in the 50-metre freestyle, with a time of 24.74.

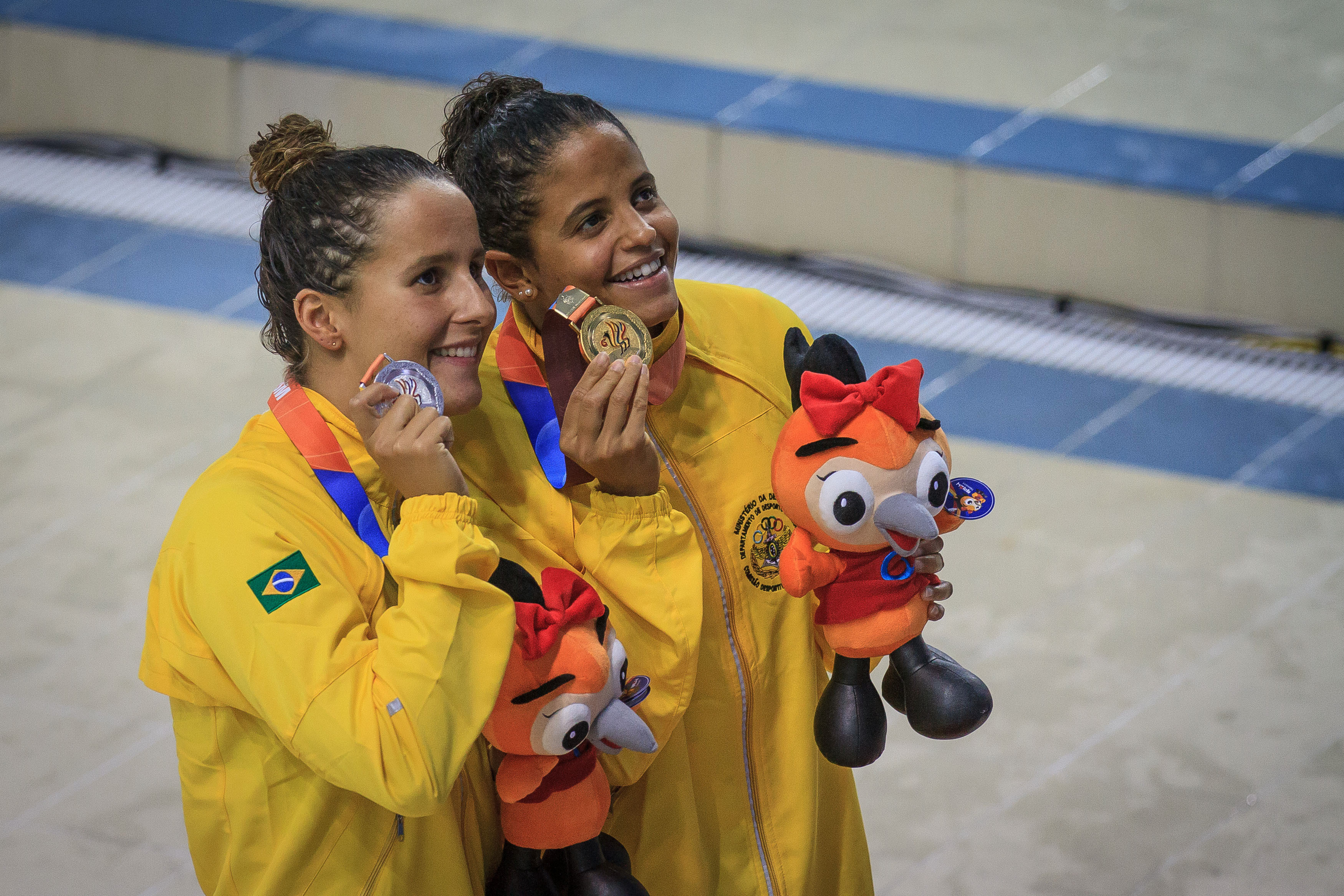
Natalia de Luccas (left) and Etiene Medeiros, 2015

At the 2015 Pan American Games in Toronto, Ontario, Canada, Medeiros made history again, winning the first gold medal in the history of Brazilian women's swimming at Pan American Games. In the Women's 100 metre backstroke, she did a time of 59.61, a new Pan Am Games and South American record. An hour after the unprecedented gold, she won the silver medal in the Women's 50 metre freestyle, with a new South American record, 24.55. In this competition, she also helped the Brazilian team to win two bronze medals in the 4 × 100 metre freestyle relay (this, breaking the South American record, with a time of 3:37.39) and 4 × 100 metre medley relay.

At the 2015 World Aquatics Championships in Kazan, in the Women's 50 metre backstroke, Etiene broke another paradigm by becoming the first Brazilian woman to climb the podium in a long-course World Championships. She won the silver medal, beating the Americas' record with a time of 27.26. In the Women's 100 metre backstroke, she came close to go to the final, finishing in 9th place, with a time of 59.97. She also finished 11th in the Women's 4 × 100 metre freestyle relay, 14th in the Women's 4 × 100 metre medley relay, and 16th in the Women's 50 metre freestyle.

At the Open tournament held in Palhoça, she broke the South American record in the 100-metre freestyle with a time of 54.26.

=== 2016 Summer Olympics ===
At the 2016 Summer Olympics, she went to the Women's 50 metre freestyle final, finishing 8th. She broke the South American record with a time of 24.45 in semifinals. She also competed in the Women's 100 metre freestyle, finishing 16th in the semifinals; in the Women's 100 metre backstroke, finishing 25th; and in the Women's 4 × 100 metre freestyle relay, finishing 11th.

=== 2016–present ===
On 13 September 2016, at the José Finkel Trophy (short course competition), she broke the South American record in the 50-metre freestyle with a time of 23.88. She came close to beating the Americas record (23.82 of Dara Torres).

On 11 December 2016, participating in the 2016 FINA World Swimming Championships (25 m) in Windsor, Canada, Medeiros won the gold medal with a time of 25.82, to repeat as the 50m backstroke champion. Etiene also obtained a silver medal in the 4x50 medley relay on 8 December. In addition to Etiene, the Brazilian team was formed by Felipe Lima, Nicholas Santos, and Larissa Oliveira. She also swam the 50m freestyle, qualifying for the semifinal with a time of 24.31, but gave up the race to focus on the others she was fighting. She also had real medal chances in this event: in September, she did a time of 23.88, which would give her the silver medal in this Worlds if repeated.

At the 2017 World Aquatics Championships in Budapest, in the Women's 50 metre backstroke, she broke two times the Americas record, with 27.18 in the semifinals, and 27.14 in the final, to obtain her first gold medal. She was only eight-hundredths of a second off Zhao Jing's world record, obtained at the super-suits era. Medeiros became the first Brazilian woman to win a gold medal at a World Championships in long course. She also finished 21st in the Women's 50 metre freestyle.

At the 2018 FINA World Swimming Championships (25 m) in Hangzhou, China, Medeiros came to try her third world title of the Women's 50 metre backstroke. However, in the event's semifinal, she slipped at the start, losing her place in the final. Then, she dedicated herself to the Women's 50 metre freestyle, where she was the South American record holder: Medeiros equaled the Americas' record in the semifinal with a time of 23.82, and in the final, she won an unprecedented bronze medal for Brazil in this event, beating the Americas Record, with a time of 23.76. She also finished 5th in the Mixed 4 × 50 metre freestyle relay, 9th in the Mixed 4 × 50 metre medley relay, and 21st in the Women's 100 metre backstroke.

At the 2019 World Aquatics Championships in Gwangju, South Korea, Medeiros won the silver medal in the Women's 50 metre backstroke. It was her third consecutive medal in this event, in World Championships. In the Women's 50 metre freestyle, she came to try a final to develop for the 2020 Olympics. However, she failed to develop a good race on this occasion, finishing 23rd.

At the 2019 Pan American Games held in Lima, Peru, Medeiros won the second gold medal in Brazilian women's swimming history (and her second individual gold) in the Women's 50 metre freestyle. She won 5 medals in total: in addition to gold, she got two silver in the Women's 4 × 100 metre freestyle relay and Mixed 4 × 100 metre freestyle relay, and two bronzes in the Women's 100 metre backstroke and the Women's 4 × 100 metre medley relay.

== Personal bests ==
Etiene Medeiros is the current holder, or former holder, of the following records:

Long course (50 meters)

- Americas record holder of the 50m backstroke: 27.14, time. Retrieved 27 July 2017
- South American record holder of the 50m freestyle: 24.45 time. Retrieved 12 August 2016
- Former South American record holder of the 100m freestyle: 54.26 time. Retrieved 18 December 2015
- South American record holder of the 100m backstroke: 59.61 time. Retrieved 17 July 2015
- South American record holder of the 4 × 100 m freestyle: 3:37.39, time. Retrieved 14 July 2015 with Larissa Oliveira, Graciele Herrmann and Daynara de Paula

Short course (25 meters)

- World record holder of the 50m backstroke: 25.67 time. Retrieved 7 December 2014
- Americas record holder of the 50m freestyle: 23.76 time. Retrieved 16 December 2018
- South American record holder of the 100m backstroke: 57.13 time. Retrieved 3 December 2014
- Former South American record holder of the 4x50m freestyle: 1:39.85, time. Retrieved 1 September 2014 with Priscila de Souza, Jéssica Cavalheiro and Daynara de Paula
- South American record holder of the 4x50m medley: 1:46.47, time. Retrieved 5 December 2014 with Ana Carla Carvalho, Daynara de Paula and Larissa Oliveira
- South American record holder of the 4x50m mixed freestyle: 1:29.17, time. Retrieved 6 December 2014 with César Cielo, João de Lucca and Larissa Oliveira
- South American record holder of the 4x50m mixed medley: 1:37.26, time. Retrieved 4 December 2014 with Felipe França, Nicholas Santos and Larissa Oliveira

== Honors and awards ==
Medeiros has received the following awards:

- Medeiros was recognized by Época magazine as one of the 100 most influential Brazilians in 2014

== See also ==
- List of world records in swimming
- List of Americas records in swimming
- List of South American records in swimming
- List of Brazilian records in swimming
- List of World Swimming Championships (25 m) medalists (women)
- World record progression 50 metres backstroke

Records
Preceded by Sanja Jovanović	Women's 50 metre backstroke world record holder (short course); 7 December 2014 – 14 November 2020	Succeeded by Kira Toussaint
