= Swimming at the 2015 Pan American Games – Women's 800 metre freestyle =

Women's 800 metre freestyle at the 2015 Pan American Games
- Venue: CIBC Pan Am/Parapan Am Aquatics Centre and Field House
- Dates: July 18 (preliminaries and finals)
- Competitors: 16 from 12 nations
- Winning time: 8:27.54

Medalists
Gold medal	Sierra Schmidt	United States
Silver medal	Kristel Köbrich	Chile
Bronze medal	Andreina Pinto	Venezuela

The women's 800 metre freestyle competition of the swimming events at the 2015 Pan American Games took place on July 18 at the CIBC Pan Am/Parapan Am Aquatics Centre and Field House in Toronto, Canada. The defending Pan American Games champion was Kristel Kobrich of Chile.

This race consisted of sixteen lengths of the pool in freestyle. All participating swimmers would take part in 2 heats based on qualifying time. There were no finals.

== Records ==
Prior to this competition, the existing world and Pan American Games records were as follows:

World record	Katie Ledecky (USA)	8:11.00	Shenandoah, United States	June 22, 2014
Pan American Games record	Kaitlin Sandeno (USA)	8:34.65	Winnipeg, Canada	August 6, 1999

The following new records were set during this competition.

Date	Event	Name	Nationality	Time	Record
15 July	Final	Sierra Schmidt	United States	8:27.54	GR

== Qualification ==
Each National Olympic Committee (NOC) was able to enter up to two entrants providing they had met the A standard (8:52.99) in the qualifying period (January 1, 2014 to May 1, 2015). NOCs were also permitted to enter one athlete providing they had met the B standard (9:24.97) in the same qualifying period. All other competing athletes were entered as universality spots.

== Schedule ==
All times are Eastern Time Zone (UTC-4).

Date	Time	Round
July 18, 2015	10:05	Final 1
July 18, 2015	19:05	Final 2

== Results ==
KEY:	q	Fastest non-qualifiers	Q	Qualified	GR	Games record	NR	National record	PB	Personal best	SB	Seasonal best

=== Final ===
The finals were held on July 18.

Rank	Heat	Lane	Name	Nationality	Time	Notes
1st place, gold medalist(s)	2	2	Sierra Schmidt	United States	8:27.54	GR
2nd place, silver medalist(s)	2	7	Kristel Köbrich	Chile	8:29.79	
3rd place, bronze medalist(s)	2	5	Andreina Pinto	Venezuela	8:31.08	
4	2	4	Brittany MacLean	Canada	8:32.06	
5	2	1	Joanna Evans	Bahamas	8:37.18	
6	2	3	Courtney Harnish	United States	8:38.00	
7	1	5	Bruna Primati	Brazil	8:40.75	
8	1	3	Monserrat Ortuño	Mexico	8:45.81	
9	2	8	Carolina Bilich	Brazil	8:47.94	
10	2	6	Tabitha Baumann	Canada	8:48.37	
11	1	4	Natalia Jaspeado	Mexico	8:53.70	
12	1	6	Valerie Gruest	Guatemala	8:55.62	
13	1	2	María Álvarez	Colombia	8:57.29	
14	1	8	Rebeca Quinteros	El Salvador	9:07.98	
15	1	7	Daniella van den Berg	Aruba	9:12.30	
16	1	1	Lani Cabrera	Barbados	9:16.88	
