= Swimming at the 2010 South American Games – Women's 400 metre freestyle =

The Women's 400m freestyle event at the 2010 South American Games was held on March 26, with the heats at 10:23 and the Final at 18:11.

== Medalists ==
Gold	Silver	Bronze
Joanna Maranhão; Brazil	Kristel Kobrich; Chile	Cecilia Biagioli; Argentina

== Records ==
Standing records prior to the 2010 South American Games
World record	Federica Pellegrini (ITA)	3:59.15	Rome, Italy	26 July 2009
Competition Record	Cecilia Biagioli (ARG)	4:13.63	Buenos Aires, Argentina	15 November 2006
South American record	Cecilia Biagioli (ARG)	4:10.16	Rome, Italy	26 July 2009

== Results ==
=== Heats ===
Rank	Heat	Lane	Athlete	Result	Notes
1	2	5	Kristel Kobrich (CHI)	4:26.78	Q
2	1	5	Joanna Maranhão (BRA)	4:27.50	Q
3	1	4	Cecilia Biagioli (ARG)	4:27.59	Q
4	2	3	Yanel Pinto (VEN)	4:28.57	Q
5	1	3	Sarah Correa (BRA)	4:30.32	Q
6	1	6	Darneyis Orozco (VEN)	4:30.92	Q
7	2	6	Nicole Maria Gilbert (ECU)	4:30.99	Q
8	2	2	Andrea del Rosario Rodriguez (PER)	4:31.70	Q
9	2	1	Isabela Acuña (COL)	4:33.14	
10	2	7	Maria Alejandra Perez (PER)	4:34.54	
11	1	7	Samantha Salinas (ECU)	4:35.08	
12	1	1	Mariana Ramirez (CHI)	4:38.48	
13	1	2	Marcela Martinez (COL)	4:47.13	
14	2	4	Ayelen Becker (ARG)	4:52.23	
	2	8	Karlene van der Jagt (SUR)	DNS	

=== Final ===
Rank	Lane	Athlete	Result	Notes
1st place, gold medalist(s)	5	Joanna Maranhão (BRA)	4:13.79	
2nd place, silver medalist(s)	4	Kristel Kobrich (CHI)	4:15.26	
3rd place, bronze medalist(s)	3	Cecilia Biagioli (ARG)	4:15.55	
4	6	Yanel Pinto (VEN)	4:27.94	
5	1	Nicole Maria Gilbert (ECU)	4:29.46	
6	8	Andrea del Rosario Rodriguez (PER)	4:31.83	
7	7	Darneyis Orozco (VEN)	4:34.13	
8	2	Sarah Correa (BRA)	4:37.96	
