= Swimming at the 2015 Pan American Games – Women's 200 metre freestyle =

Women's 200 metre freestyle at the 2015 Pan American Games
- Venue: CIBC Pan Am/Parapan Am Aquatics Centre and Field House
- Dates: July 15 (preliminaries and finals)
- Competitors: 20 from 14 nations
- Winning time: 1:56.23

Medalists
Gold medal	Allison Schmitt	United States
Silver medal	Emily Overholt	Canada
Bronze medal	Manuella Lyrio	Brazil

The women's 200 metre freestyle competition of the swimming events at the 2015 Pan American Games took place on 15th July,2015 at the CIBC Pan Am/Parapan Am Aquatics Centre and Field House in Toronto, Canada. The defending Pan American Games champion was Catherine Breed of the United States.

This race consisted of four lengths of the pool, all lengths in freestyle. The top eight swimmers from the heats would qualify for the A final (where the medals would be awarded), while the next best eight swimmers would qualify for the B final.

== Records ==
Prior to this competition, the existing world and Pan American Games records were as follows:

World record	Federica Pellegrini (ITA)	1:52.98	Rome, Italy	July 29, 2009
Pan American Games Record	Cynthia Woodhead (USA)	1:58.43	San Juan, Puerto Rico	July 3, 1979

The following new records were set during this competition.

Date	Event	Name	Nationality	Time	Record
15 July	A Final	Allison Schmitt	United States	1:56.23	GR

== Qualification ==
Each National Olympic Committee (NOC) was able to enter up to two entrants providing they had met the A standard (2:04.99) in the qualifying period (January 1, 2014 to May 1, 2015). NOCs were also permitted to enter one athlete providing they had met the B standard (2:12.49) in the same qualifying period. All other competing athletes were entered as universality spots.

== Schedule ==
All times are Eastern Time Zone (UTC-4).

Date	Time	Round
July 15, 2015	10:05	Heats
July 15, 2015	19:05	Final B
July 15, 2015	19:11	Final A

== Results ==
KEY:	q	Fastest non-qualifiers	Q	Qualified	GR	Games record	NR	National record	PB	Personal best	SB	Seasonal best

=== Heats ===
The first round was held on July 15.

Rank	Heat	Lane	Name	Nationality	Time	Notes
1	3	4	Allison Schmitt	United States	1:58.58	QA
2	3	5	Manuella Lyrio	Brazil	1:59.60	QA
3	2	4	Larissa Oliveira	Brazil	1:59.62	QA
4	2	5	Katerine Savard	Canada	1:59.74	QA
5	1	5	Kiera Janzen	United States	2:00.30	QA
6	1	4	Emily Overholt	Canada	2:00.43	QA
7	3	3	Andreina Pinto	Venezuela	2:00.61	QA
8	1	3	Elisbet Gamez	Cuba	2:01.85	QA
9	2	3	Jessica Camposano	Colombia	2:02.27	QB
10	2	2	María Álvarez	Colombia	2:02.48	QB
11	3	6	Andrea Cedrón	Peru	2:04.55	QB
12	2	6	Natalia Jaspeado	Mexico	2:05.21	QB
13	3	7	Rebeca Quinteros	El Salvador	2:05.26	QB
14	1	2	Andrea Garrido	Venezuela	2:05.31	QB
15	3	2	Gabriela Santis	Guatemala	2:05.37	QB
16	1	6	Maria Richaud	Mexico	2:06.84	QB
17	2	7	Lani Cabrera	Bahamas	2:07.41	
18	1	7	Daniella van den Berg	Aruba	2:08.49	
19	3	1	Karen Riveros	Paraguay	2:10.32	
20	2	1	Samantha Roberts	Antigua and Barbuda	2:17.25	

=== B Final ===
The B final was also held on July 15.

Rank	Lane	Name	Nationality	Time	Notes
9	4	Jessica Camposano	Colombia	2:00.68	NR
10	5	María Álvarez	Colombia	2:02.81	
11	7	Andrea Garrido	Venezuela	2:03.33	
12	8	Maria Richaud	Mexico	2:03.69	
13	6	Natalia Jaspeado	Mexico	2:03.69	
14	1	Gabriela Santis	Guatemala	2:03.94	
15	3	Andrea Cedrón	Peru	2:04.11	
16	2	Rebeca Quinteros	El Salvador	2:06.19	

=== A Final ===
The A final was also held on July 15.

Rank	Lane	Name	Nationality	Time	Notes
1st place, gold medalist(s)	4	Allison Schmitt	United States	1:56.23	GR
2nd place, silver medalist(s)	7	Emily Overholt	Canada	1:57.55	
3rd place, bronze medalist(s)	5	Manuella Lyrio	Brazil	1:58.03	SA
4	6	Katerine Savard	Canada	1:58.70	
5	3	Larissa Oliveira	Brazil	2:00.32	
6	2	Kiera Janzen	United States	2:00.34	
7	1	Andreina Pinto	Venezuela	2:00.62	
8	8	Elisbet Gamez	Cuba	2:01.84	
