= Carolina Bilich =

Brazilian swimmer (born 1995)

Personal information
- Full name: Carolina Bilich Queiroz
- Nationality: Brazil
- Born: July 12, 1995 (age 30) Vitória, Espírito Santo, Brazil
- Height: 1.74 m (5 ft 9 in)
- Weight: 62 kg (137 lb)

Sport
- Sport: Swimming
- Strokes: Freestyle
- Club: Minas Tênis Clube
Medal record
Women's swimming
Representing Brazil
South American Games
Gold medal – first place	2014 Santiago	4 x 200 m freestyle

Carolina Bilich Queiroz (born July 12, 1995 in Vitória, Espírito Santo) is a freestyle swimmer from Brazil.

In 2009, after her stand out in the School Games in Poços de Caldas, Minas Gerais, where she won five gold medals and five records in the national competition, Queiroz was summoned to South American Championships held in Ecuador, in November of the same year.

In 2011, at the Youth South American Championships in Lima, Peru, she won the 400-metre and 800-metre freestyle. At the 2012 South American Swimming Championships held in Belém, she ranked 4th in the 800-metre freestyle and won the silver medal in the 1500-metre freestyle. At the 2013 Youth South American Championships, held in Valparaiso, Chile, Queiroz got the gold medals in the 200-metre, 400-metre, 800-metre freestyle and race teams for 3 km.

She classified to swim at two proofs in the 2013 World Aquatics Championships in Barcelona. In the 400-metre freestyle, she finished 29th, with a time of 4:21.40, far from her best career time, which is 4:14.99. "I did not feel very well. Started well in the 200-metre, but then fell yield. It's my first World Championships. Served more to break the ice", said Queiroz. She also finished 26th in the 800-metre freestyle and 10th in the 4×200-metre freestyle, along with Jéssica Cavalheiro, Manuella Lyrio and Larissa Oliveira.

At the 2014 South American Games, in Santiago, she won a gold medal in the 4 × 200 metre freestyle relay. She also finished 4th in the 400 metre freestyle, 6th in the 800 metre freestyle and 7th in the 1500 metre freestyle.

At the 2015 Pan American Games in Toronto, Ontario, Canada, in the Open Water competition, Bilich finished 10th in the Women's marathon 10 kilometres. In the swimming competitions, she finished 7th in the Women's 400 metre freestyle and 9th in the Women's 800 metre freestyle.

At the 2015 FINA World Championships in Kazan, Bilich finished 17th in the 5 km marathon.
