= Swimming at the 2019 Pan American Games – Women's 200 metre freestyle =

Women's 200 metre freestyle at the 2019 Pan American Games
- Venue: Villa Deportiva Nacional, VIDENA
- Dates: August 7 (preliminaries and finals)
- Competitors: 25 from 20 nations

Medalists
Gold medal	Claire Rasmus	United States
Silver medal	Meaghan Raab	United States
Bronze medal	Larissa Oliveira	Brazil

The women's 200 metre freestyle competition of the swimming events at the 2019 Pan American Games was held on 7 August 2019 at the Villa Deportiva Nacional Videna cluster.

== Records ==
Prior to this competition, the existing world and Pan American Games records were as follows:

World record	Federica Pellegrini (ITA)	1:52.98	Rome, Italy	July 29, 2009
Pan American Games Record	Allison Schmitt (USA)	1:56.23	Toronto, Canada	July 15, 2015

== Results ==
KEY:	q	Fastest non-qualifiers	Q	Qualified	GR	Games record	NR	National record	PB	Personal best	SB	Seasonal best

=== Heats ===
The first round was held on August 7.

Rank	Heat	Lane	Name	Nationality	Time	Notes
1	4	5	Meaghan Raab	United States	1:58.42	QA
2	3	5	Claire Rasmus	United States	1:59.35	QA
3	2	5	Alyson Ackman	Canada	2:00.18	QA
4	4	4	Manuella Lyrio	Brazil	2:00.42	QA
5	3	4	Elisbet Gámez Matos	Cuba	2:00.95	QA
6	2	4	Larissa Oliveira	Brazil	2:01.08	QA
7	4	3	Katerine Savard	Canada	2:01.32	QA
8	4	6	Allyson Macías Alba	Mexico	2:04.45	QA
9	2	3	María Matta Coco	Mexico	2:04.54	QB
10	3	3	María Álvarez	Colombia	2:04.76	QB
11	3	7	Inés Marín	Chile	2:06.09	QB
12	2	7	Michelle Jativa Revelo	Ecuador	2:06.29	QB
13	3	6	Sara Pastrana	Honduras	2:06.65	QB
14	2	2	Giselle Gursoy	Trinidad and Tobago	2:07.38	QB
15	3	1	Nicole Rautemberg	Paraguay	2:07.74	QB
16	2	6	Andrea Garrido Urbina	Venezuela	2:08.04	QB
17	3	2	María Mejia	Guatemala	2:08.32	
18	4	7	Azra Avdic	Peru	2:08.86	
19	4	8	Nicole Frank Rodriguez	Uruguay	2:09.97	
20	2	1	Ireyra Tamayo	Panama	2:12.46	
21	4	1	Lauren Hew	Cayman Islands	2:14.50	
22	1	4	Natalia Kuipers	Virgin Islands	2:16.80	
23	3	8	María Hernández	Nicaragua	2:17.25	
24	1	3	Bianca Mitchell	Antigua and Barbuda	2:18.70	
25	1	5	Mya de Freitas	Saint Vincent and the Grenadines	2:19.99	

=== Final B ===
The B final was also held on August 7.

Rank	Lane	Name	Nationality	Time	Notes
9	4	María Matta Coco	Mexico	2:03.32	
10	5	María Álvarez	Colombia	2:03.53	
11	8	Andrea Garrido Urbina	Venezuela	2:06.14	
12	2	Sara Pastrana	Honduras	2:06.40	
13	3	Inés Marín	Chile	2:06.64	
14	7	Giselle Gursoy	Trinidad and Tobago	2:06.98	
15	1	Nicole Rautemberg	Paraguay	2:07.20	
16	6	Michelle Jativa Revelo	Ecuador	2:08.89	

=== Final A ===
The A final was also held on August 7.

Rank	Lane	Name	Nationality	Time	Notes
1st place, gold medalist(s)	5	Claire Rasmus	United States	1:58.64	
2nd place, silver medalist(s)	4	Meaghan Raab	United States	1:58.70	
3rd place, bronze medalist(s)	7	Larissa Oliveira	Brazil	1:59.78	
4	3	Alyson Ackman	Canada	1:59.92	
5	2	Elisbet Gámez Matos	Cuba	2:00.25	
6	6	Manuella Lyrio	Brazil	2:00.44	
7	1	Katerine Savard	Canada	2:01.18	
8	8	Allyson Macías Alba	Mexico	2:03.41	
