= Swimming at the 2011 Pan American Games – Women's 800 metre freestyle =

Women's 800 metre freestyle at the 2011 Pan American Games
- Venue: Scotiabank Aquatics Center
- Dates: October 18–19
- Competitors: 17 from 12 nations

Medalists
Gold medal	Kristel Kobrich	Chile
Silver medal	Ashley Twichell	United States
Bronze medal	Andreina Pinto	Venezuela

The women's 800 metre freestyle competition of the swimming events at the 2011 Pan American Games took place between October 18 and 19 at the Scotiabank Aquatics Center in the municipality of Zapopan, near Guadalajara, Mexico. The defending Pan American Games champion was Caroline Burckle of the United States.

This race consisted of sixteen lengths of the pool, all in freestyle.

== Records ==
Prior to this competition, the existing world and Pan American Games records were as follows:

World record	Rebecca Adlington (GBR)	8:14.10	Beijing, China	August 16, 2008
Pan American Games record	Kaitlin Sandeno (USA)	8:34.65	Winnipeg, Canada	August 6, 1999

== Qualification ==
Each National Olympic Committee (NOC) was able to enter up to two entrants providing they had met the A standard (9:05.8) in the qualifying period (January 1, 2010 to September 4, 2011). NOCs were also permitted to enter one athlete providing they had met the B standard (9:22.2) in the same qualifying period.

== Results ==
All times are in minutes and seconds.

KEY:	q	Fastest non-qualifiers	Q	Qualified	GR	Games record	NR	National record	PB	Personal best	SB	Seasonal best

=== Heats ===
The first round was held on October 18.

Rank	Heat	Lane	Name	Nationality	Time	Notes
1	2	4	Kristel Kobrich	Chile	8:42.16	QA
2	3	5	Ashley Twichell	United States	8:47.21	QA
3	1	4	Andreina Pinto	Venezuela	8:49.81	QA
4	1	5	Susana Escobar	Mexico	8:52.65	QA
5	2	5	Patricia Castañeda	Mexico	8:56.55	QA
6	2	6	Samantha Arevalo	Ecuador	8:59.39	QA
7	1	2	Yanel Pinto	Venezuela	9:03.62	QA
8	3	3	Alexia Benitez	El Salvador	9:05.16	QA
9	2	3	Sherry Liu	Canada	9:05.88	
10	3	6	Bridget Coley	Canada	9:06.35	
11	1	3	Virginia Bardach	Argentina	9:10.06	
12	2	2	Gabriela Rocha	Brazil	9:13.64	
13	3	7	Lani Cabrera	Barbados	9:20.83	
14	1	6	Daniela Miyahara	Peru	9:21.64	
15	3	2	Sarah Correa	Brazil	9:27.34	
16	2	7	Tori Flowers	Cayman Islands	9:41.51	
	3	4	Gillian Ryan	United States		DNS

=== Final ===
The final was held on October 19.

Rank	Lane	Name	Nationality	Time	Notes
1st place, gold medalist(s)	4	Kristel Kobrich	Chile	8:34.71	
2nd place, silver medalist(s)	5	Ashley Twichell	United States	8:38.38	
3rd place, bronze medalist(s)	3	Andreina Pinto	Venezuela	8:44.55	
4	2	Patricia Castañeda	Mexico	8:49.07	
5	7	Samantha Arevalo	Ecuador	8:51.31	
6	6	Susana Escobar	Mexico	8:52.51	
7	8	Alexia Benitez	El Salvador	9:03.53	
8	1	Yanel Pinto	Venezuela	9:07.73	
