= Swimming at the 2015 Pan American Games – Women's marathon 10 kilometres =

Women's marathon 10 kilometres at the 2015 Pan American Games
- Venue: Ontario Place West Channel
- Dates: July 11
- Competitors: 18 from 12 nations
- Winning time: 2:03:17.0

Medalists
| Gold medal | Eva Fabian | United States |
| Silver medal | Paola Pérez | Venezuela |
| Bronze medal | Samantha Arévalo | Ecuador |

The women's marathon 10 kilometres competition of the swimming events at the 2015 Pan American Games took place on July 12 at the Ontario Place West Channel, where athletes completed six 1.67 km laps. The defending Pan American Games champion was Cecilia Biagioli of Argentina.

== Schedule ==
All times are in Eastern Standard Time (UTC-3).

| Date | Time | Round |
|---|---|---|
| July 11, 2015 | 15:30 | Final |

== Results ==
| Rank | Swimmer | Time |
|---|---|---|
| 1st place, gold medalist(s) | Eva Fabian (USA) | 2:03:17.0 |
| 2nd place, silver medalist(s) | Paola Pérez (VEN) | 2:03:17.0 |
| 3rd place, bronze medalist(s) | Samantha Arévalo (ECU) | 2:03:17.1 |
| 4 | Emily Brunemann (USA) | 2:03:17.5 |
| 5 | Kristel Köbrich (CHI) | 2:03:25.8 |
| 6 | Zaira Cardenas (MEX) | 2:03:28.3 |
| 7 | Jade Dusablon (CAN) | 2:04:36.7 |
| 8 | Samantha Harding (CAN) | 2:04:37.7 |
| 9 | Cecilia Biagioli (ARG) | 2:04:37.8 |
| 10 | Carolina Bilich (BRA) | 2:04:40.3 |
| 11 | Monserrat Ortuno (MEX) | 2:06:28.2 |
| 12 | Julia Arino (ARG) | 2:07:54.1 |
| 13 | Liliana Hernandez Vera (VEN) | 2:09:19.6 |
| 14 | Fatima Flores Guzman (ESA) | 2:14:15.0 |
| 15 | Cindy Toscano Merida (GUA) | 2:14:45.6 |
| 16 | Maria Astorga Perez (CRC) | 2:21:40.8 |
| 17 | Fernanda Archila Salazar (GUA) | 2:26:55.0 |
| 18 | Emma Quintanilla Lizano (HON) | 2:27:08.4 |
