= Swimming at the 2010 South American Games – Women's 1500 metre freestyle =

The Women's 1500m freestyle event at the 2010 South American Games was held on March 29 at 18:00.

== Medalists ==
Gold	Silver	Bronze
Kristel Kobrich; Chile	Andreina Pinto; Venezuela	Yanel Pinto; Venezuela

== Records ==
Standing records prior to the 2010 South American Games
World record	Kate Ziegler (USA)	15:42.54	Mission Viejo, United States	17 June 2007
Competition Record	Kristel Kobrich (CHI)	16:30.55	Buenos Aires, Argentina	18 November 2006
South American record	Kristel Kobrich (CHI)	15:57.57	Rome, Italy	28 July 2009

== Results ==
=== Final ===
Rank	Lane	Athlete	Result	Notes
1st place, gold medalist(s)	4	Kristel Kobrich (CHI)	16:26.15	CR
2nd place, silver medalist(s)	5	Andreina Pinto (VEN)	16:54.96	
3rd place, bronze medalist(s)	5	Yanel Pinto (VEN)	17:17.21	
4	3	Sarah Correa (BRA)	17:19.97	
5	2	Isabela Acuña (COL)	17:53.41	
6	1	Katia Paola Esquivel (ECU)	18:06.70	
7	7	Karol Agredo (COL)	18:19.67	
8	8	Karlene van der Jagt (SUR)	19:57.98	
