= Esteban Enderica =

Ecuadorian swimmer (born 1990)

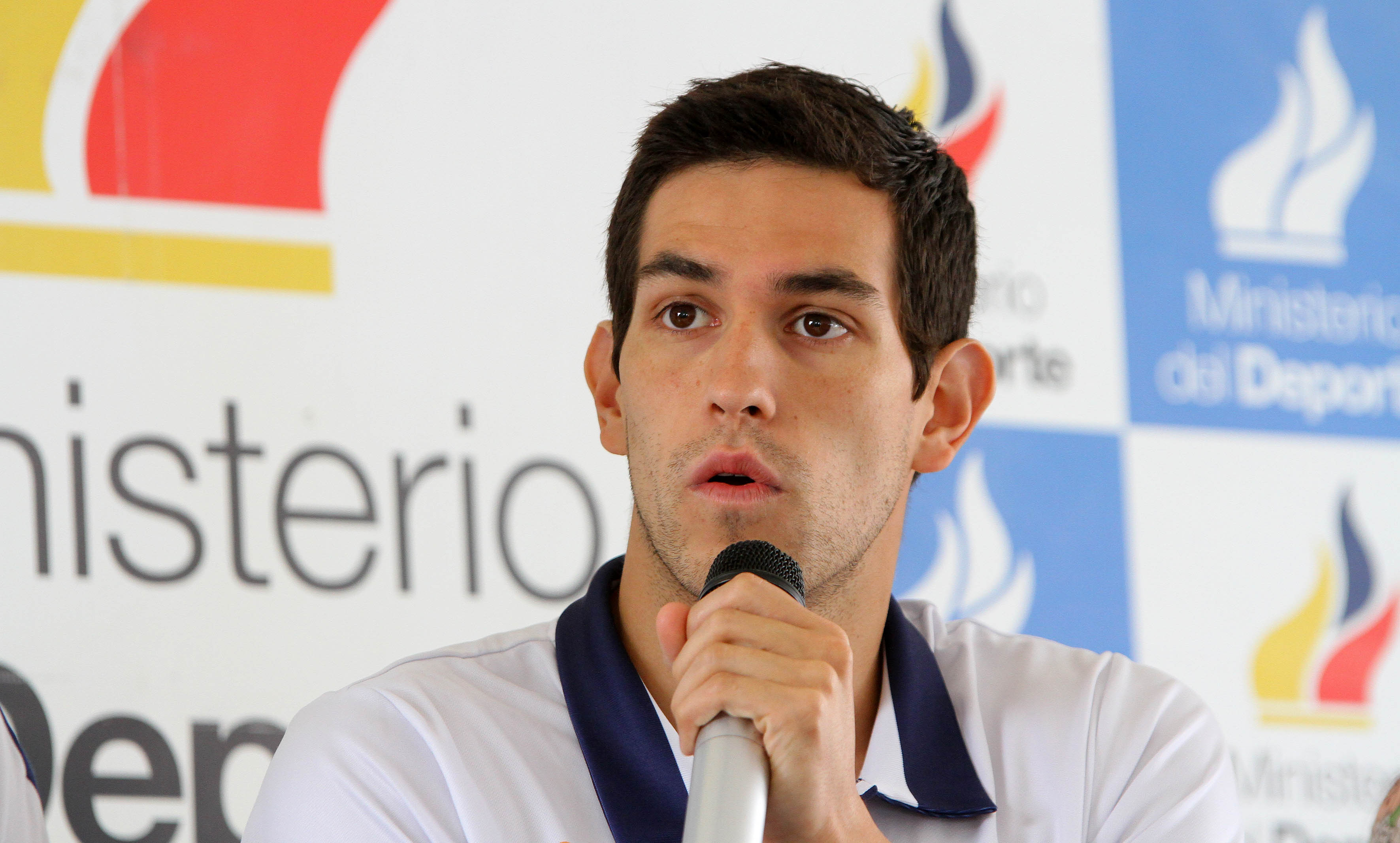

Personal information
- Full name: Esteban José Enderica Salgado
- Nationality: Ecuador
- Born: October 30, 1990 (age 35) Cuenca, Ecuador
- Height: 1.75 m (5 ft 9 in)
- Weight: 77 kg (170 lb)

Sport
- Sport: Swimming
- Strokes: Freestyle, individual medley
Medal record
Men's swimming
Pan American Games
Gold medal – first place	2019 Lima	10 km open water
Bronze medal – third place	2015 Toronto	10 km open water
South American Games
Gold medal – first place	2014 Santiago	1500 m freestyle
Gold medal – first place	2018 Cochabamba	1500 m freestyle
Gold medal – first place	2018 Cochabamba	10 km open water
Silver medal – second place	2010 Medellín	400 m medley
Silver medal – second place	2014 Santiago	400 m medley
Silver medal – second place	2014 Santiago	800 m freestyle
Silver medal – second place	2014 Santiago	3 km team
Bronze medal – third place	2018 Cochabamba	400 m freestyle

Esteban José Enderica Salgado (born 30 October 1990 in Cuenca) is an Ecuadorian swimmer who competes in the men's 400m individual medley and open water swimming events. At the 2012 Summer Olympics he finished 29th overall in the heats in the men's 400 metre individual medley and failed to reach the final. At the 2016 Olympics, he competed in the 1500 m freestyle and 10 km open water marathon, finishing in 23rd and 16th place respectively.
