= Swimming at the 2015 Pan American Games – Women's 4 × 200 metre freestyle relay =

Women's 4 × 200 metre freestyle relay at the 2015 Pan American Games
- Venue: CIBC Pan Am/Parapan Am Aquatics Centre and Field House
- Dates: July 16 (preliminaries and finals)
- Competitors: 33 from 6 nations
- Winning time: 7:54.32

Medalists
Gold medal	Kiera Janzen, Allison Schmitt, Courtney Harnish, Gillian Ryan, Amanda Weir, Kylie Stewart	United States
Silver medal	Manuella Lyrio, Jéssica Cavalheiro, Joanna Maranhão, Larissa Oliveira, Bruna Primati, Gabrielle Roncatto	Brazil
Bronze medal	Emily Overholt, Katerine Savard, Alyson Ackman, Brittany MacLean, Erika Seltenreich-Hodgson, Tabitha Baumann	Canada

The women's 4 × 200 metre freestyle relay competition of the swimming events at the 2015 Pan American Games took place on July 16 at the CIBC Pan Am/Parapan Am Aquatics Centre and Field House in Toronto, Canada. The defending Pan American Games champion is the United States.

This race consisted of sixteen lengths of the pool. Each of the four swimmers completed four lengths of the pool. The first swimmer had to touch the wall before the second could leave the starting block.

== Records ==
Prior to this competition, the existing world and Pan American Games records were as follows:

World record	China (CHN); Yang Yu (1:55.47); Zhu Qianwei (1:55.79); Liu Jing (1:56.09); Pang Jiaying (1:54.73)	7:42.08	Rome, Italy	July 30, 2009
Pan American Games record	United States (USA); Catherine Breed (2:00.99); Elizabeth Pelton (2:00.11); Chelsea Nauta (2:00.49); Amanda Kendall (1:59.59)	8:01.19	Guadalajara, Mexico	October 18, 2011

The following new records were set during this competition.

Date	Event	Nation	Time	Record
16 July	Final	United States	7:54.32	GR

== Schedule ==
All times are Eastern Time Zone (UTC-4).

Date	Time	Round
July 16, 2015	11:08	Heats
July 16, 2015	20:28	Final

== Results ==
=== Heats ===
The first round was held on July 16. As only six teams had entered, the heats served as a ranking round with all six teams advancing to the final.

Rank	Heat	Lane	Name	Nationality	Time	Notes
1	1	4	Courtney Harnish (2:01.25); Amanda Weir (2:02.52); Kylie Stewart (2:02.49); Gillian Ryan (1:59.26)	United States	8:05.52	Q
2	1	5	Erika Seltenreich-Hodgson (2:01.60); Alyson Ackman (2:01.33); Brittany MacLean (2:00.10); Tabitha Baumann (2:03.03)	Canada	8:06.06	Q
3	1	3	Jéssica Cavalheiro (2:00.78); Bruna Primati (2:02.94); Gabrielle Roncatto (2:08.58); Larissa Oliveira (2:07.57)	Brazil	8:19.87	Q
4	1	2	Maria Hichaud (2:06.29); Allyson Macias (2:04.89); Moniika Gonzalez-Hermosillo (2:08.11); Liliana Ibáñez (2:02.75)	Mexico	8:22.04	Q
5	1	7	Jessica Cattaneo (2:05.29); Andrea Cedrón (2:06.54); Kaori Miyahara (2:08.72); McKenna DeBever (2:10.06)	Peru	8:30.61	Q, NR
6	1	6	Mercedes Toledo (2:05.85); Jeserik Pinto (2:09.51); Andrea Garrido (2:13.11); Yennifer Marquez (2:05.44)	Venezuela	8:33.91	Q
	1	1		Colombia	DNS	

=== Final ===
The final was held on July 16.

Rank	Lane	Name	Nationality	Time	Notes
1st place, gold medalist(s)	4	Kiera Janzen (1:59.61); Allison Schmitt (1:55.98); Courtney Harnish (1:59.61); Gillian Ryan (1:59.12)	United States	7:54.32	GR
2nd place, silver medalist(s)	3	Manuella Lyrio (1:58.98); Jéssica Cavalheiro (1:59.03); Joanna Maranhão (1:59.31); Larissa Oliveira (1:59.04)	Brazil	7:56.36	SA
3rd place, bronze medalist(s)	5	Emily Overholt (1:58.83); Katerine Savard (2:01.02); Alyson Ackman (2:00.31); Brittany MacLean (1:59.20)	Canada	7:59.36	
4	7	Andreina Pinto (2:00.90); Andrea Garrido (2:02.74); Mercedes Toledo (2:05.48); Yennifer Marquez (2:03.98)	Venezuela	8:13.10	NR
5	2	Jessica Cattaneo (2:07.72); Kaori Miyahara (2:10.69); Andrea Cedrón (2:09.72); McKenna DeBever (2:14.40)	Peru	8:42.53	
	6	Liliana Ibáñez (2:03.60); Esther González; Maria Hichaud; Natalia Jaspeado	Mexico	DSQ	
