= Swimming at the 2014 South American Games =

- Dates: March 7–10

The swimming events at the 2014 South American Games were held from March 7–10 at the new Aquatic Center of the Estadio Nacional (trans: "National Stadium") in Santiago.

== Event schedule ==
=== Open Water schedule ===
- Sunday, March 16: 10-kilometer man/woman races (10K)
- Monday, March 17: 3-kilometer mixed race (3K)

=== Pool finals schedule ===
Date	Friday; March 7	Saturday; March 8	Sunday; March 9	Monday; March 10
E v e n t s	800 free (M); 400 free (W); 200 back (M); 100 fly (W); 100 breast (M); 200 IM (W); 200 free (M); 4x200 free relay (W)	800 free (W); 200 fly (M); 200 back (W); 400 free (M); 100 free (W); 100 back (M); 400 IM (W); 4x200 free relay (M)	50 free (M); 1500 free (M); 200 breast (W); 100 fly (M); 200 free (W); 200 IM (M); 200 fly (W); 4x100 medley relay (M); 4x100 free relay (W)	50 free (W); 1500 free (W); 200 breast (M); 100 back (W); 100 free (M); 100 breast (W); 400 IM (M); 4x100 medley relay (W); 4x100 free relay (M)

== Results ==
=== Men's events ===
Event	Gold		Silver		Bronze	
50 m freestyle	Bruno Fratus (BRA)	22.40	Federico Grabich (ARG)	22.86	Renzo Tjon-A-Joe (SUR)	22.88
100 m freestyle	Matheus Santana (BRA)	49.13 CR	Federico Grabich (ARG)	49.66	Albert Subirats (VEN)	49.72
200 m freestyle	Federico Grabich (ARG)	1:49.39 CR	Nicolas Oliveira (BRA)	1:49.72	Mauricio Fiol (PER)	1:50.30 NR
400 m freestyle	Martín Naidich (ARG)	3:56.23 CR	Juan Pereyra (ARG)	3:56.80	Marcos Ferrari (BRA)	3:56.89
800 m freestyle	Martín Naidich (ARG)	8:05.28 CR	Esteban Enderica (ECU)	8:07.78	Marcos Ferrari (BRA)	8:09.93
1500 m freestyle	Esteban Enderica (ECU)	15:27.92 CR	Andy Arteta Gomez (VEN)	15:30.80	Alejandro Gómez (VEN)	15:35.58
100 m backstroke	Albert Subirats (VEN)	54.31 CR, NR	Federico Grabich (ARG)	55.22	Fernando dos Santos (BRA)	55.27
200 m backstroke	Leonardo de Deus (BRA)	2:00.28 CR	Matías López (PAR)	2:02.43 NR	David Céspedes (COL)	2:04.12
100 m breaststroke	Felipe Lima (BRA)	1:01.63 CR	Carlos Claverie (VEN)	1:02.19	Édgar Crespo (PAN)	1:02.58
200 m breaststroke	Henrique Barbosa (BRA)	2:15.42 CR	Tales Cerdeira (BRA)	2:16.58	Carlos Claverie (VEN)	2:17.02
100 m butterfly	Albert Subirats (VEN)	52.26 CR	Mauricio Fiol (PER)	53.24	Fernando Silva (BRA)	53.88
200 m butterfly	Leonardo de Deus (BRA)	1:57.84 CR	Mauricio Fiol (PER)	1:58.81	Andres Montoya (COL)	1:58.99
200 m I.M.	Thiago Pereira (BRA)	2:00.29 CR	Thiago Simon (BRA)	2:02.80	Carlos Claverie (VEN)	2:05.77
400 m I.M.	Thiago Pereira (BRA)	4:23.15 CR	Esteban Enderica (ECU)	4:25.30	Thiago Simon (BRA)	4:27.86
4×100 m freestyle relay	Brazil; Nicolas Oliveira (50.17); Matheus Santana (48.99); Fernando dos Santos (50.12); Fernando Silva (50.16)	3:19.44 CR	Argentina; Joaquin Belza (52.06); Matías Aguilera (49.67); Guido Buscaglia (50.61); Federico Grabich (48.97)	3:21.31 NR	Venezuela; Jesus Daniel Lopez (51.70); Roberto Goméz (50.87); Migue Angel Perez (50.64); Albert Subirats (48.27)	3:21.48
4×200 m freestyle relay	Brazil; Nicolas Oliveira (1:49.17) CR; Thiago Pereira (1:52.00); Fernando Silva (1:52.01); Fernando dos Santos (1:52.17)	7:25.35 CR	Colombia; Alberto Morales (1:52.54); Mauricio Vasquez (1:55.13); Julio Galofre (1:52.46); Mateo de Angulo (1:50.42)	7:30.55	Venezuela; Daniele Tirabassi (1:51.32); Cristian Delgado (1:53.86); Marcos Mora (1:52.71); Migue Angel Perez (1:52.78)	7:30.67
4×100 m medley relay	Brazil; Fernando dos Santos (55.46); Felipe Lima (1:00.50); Nicholas Santos (52.95); Matheus Santana (49.04)	3:37.95 CR	Argentina; Federico Grabich (55.59); Gabriel Morelli (1:02.42); Marcos Barale (53.58); Matías Aguilera (48.92)	3:40.51 NR	Venezuela; Albert Subirats (54.57); Carlos Claverie (1:02.19); Cristian Delgado (55.32); Roberto Goméz (50.58)	3:42.66
10 km Open Water	Allan do Carmo (BRA)	1:56:43	Diego Vera (VEN)	1:56:45	Santiago Enderica (ECU)	1:56:50

Legend: CR – Championship record; NR – National record

=== Women's events ===
Event	Gold		Silver		Bronze	
50 m freestyle	Graciele Herrmann (BRA)	25.26 CR	Alessandra Marchioro (BRA)	25.43	Chinyere Pigot (SUR)	26.05
100 m freestyle	Larissa Oliveira (BRA)	55.70 CR	Graciele Herrmann (BRA)	56.36	Chinyere Pigot (SUR); Arlene Semeco (VEN)	56.92
200 m freestyle	Andreina Pinto (VEN)	1:59.89 CR, NR	Jessica Camposano (COL)	2:01.10 NR	Jéssica Cavalheiro (BRA)	2:01.27
400 m freestyle	Andreina Pinto (VEN)	4:10.71 CR	Kristel Köbrich (CHI)	4:15.15	Manuella Lyrio (BRA)	4:20.86
800 m freestyle	Andreina Pinto (VEN)	8:35.41 CR	Kristel Köbrich (CHI)	8:37.19	Cecilia Biagioli (ARG)	8:45.68
1500 m freestyle	Kristel Köbrich (CHI)	16:15.89 CR	Samantha Arévalo (ECU)	16:38.05 NR	Cecilia Biagioli (ARG)	16:38.54
100 m backstroke	Carolina Colorado Henao (COL)	1:02.56	Etiene Medeiros (BRA)	1:02.85	Natalia de Luccas (BRA)	1:02.92
200 m backstroke	Carolina Colorado Henao (COL)	2:14.42 CR	Andrea Berrino (ARG)	2:15.52	Natalia de Luccas (BRA)	2:17.96
100 m breaststroke	Julia Sebastián (ARG)	1:10.40	Macarena Ceballos (ARG)	1:11.00	Mercedes Toledo (VEN)	1:11.56
200 m breaststroke	Pamela Alencar de Souza (BRA)	2:31.02 CR	Mercedes Toledo (VEN)	2:34.62	Juliana Marin (BRA)	2:36.32
100 m butterfly	Daynara de Paula (BRA)	59.35 CR	Carolina Colorado Henao (COL)	1:00.14	Etiene Medeiros (BRA)	1:00.88
200 m butterfly	Andreina Pinto (VEN)	2:12.42 CR	Isabella Paez (VEN)	2:15.31	Virginia Bardach (ARG)	2:16.79
200 m I.M.	Virginia Bardach (ARG)	2:19.44	Florencia Perotti (ARG)	2:20.67	Júlia Gerotto (BRA)	2:21.22
400 m I.M.	Andreina Pinto (VEN)	4:51.17 CR	Virginia Bardach (ARG)	4:52.94	Júlia Gerotto (BRA)	4:55.36
4×100 m freestyle relay	Brazil; Daynara de Paula (56.15); Larissa Oliveira (55.61); Alessandra Marchioro (56.01); Graciele Herrmann (56.42)	3:44.19 CR	Venezuela; Wendy Crespo (57.65); Erika Torrellas (57.24); Arlene Semeco (56.67); Andreina Pinto (57.22)	3:48.78	Argentina; Andrea Berrino (57.46); Aixa Triay (56.84); Cecilia Biagioli (58.52); Maria Belen Diaz (57.21)	3:50.03 NR
4×200 m freestyle relay	Brazil; Larissa Oliveira (2:02.52); Jéssica Cavalheiro (2:03.73); Carolina Bilich (2:07.18); Manuella Lyrio (2:04.91)	8:18.34 CR	Venezuela; Wendy Crespo (2:05.72); Erika Torrellas (2:08.93); Yennifer Mendoza (2:08.27); Andreina Pinto (2:00.19)	8:23.11	Colombia; Carolina Colorado Henao (2:04.18); María Álvarez (2:07.90); María Muñoz (2:07.48); Jessica Camposano (2:04.21)	8:23.77 NR
4×100 m medley relay	Brazil; Etiene Medeiros (1:04.14); Beatriz Travalon (1:12.77); Daynara de Paula (59.92); Larissa Oliveira (54.66)	4:11.49 CR	Argentina; Andrea Berrino (1:04.19); Julia Sebastián (1:09.60); Maria Belen Diaz (1:01.78); Aixa Triay (56.60)	4:12.17 NR	Colombia; Carolina Colorado Henao (1:02.37); Salome Cataño (1:13.56); Jessica Camposano (1:01.47); María Muñoz (57.99)	4:15.39
10 km Open Water	Kristel Köbrich (CHI)	1:58:06	Cecilia Biagioli (ARG)	1:59:35	Ana Marcela Cunha (BRA)	2:00:15

Legend: CR – Championship record; NR – National record

=== Team ===
Event	Gold		Silver		Bronze	
3 km Mixed Team	Brazil; Allan do Carmo; Ana Marcela Cunha; Diogo Villarinho	34:05:29	Ecuador; Esteban Enderica; Santiago Enderica; Samantha Arevalo	34:44:24	Chile; Miguel Tapia Salinas; Vicente Kubierschky; Kristel Köbrich	34:54:93

== Swimming medal standings ==
Rank	Nation	Gold	Silver	Bronze	Total
1	Brazil (BRA)	18	6	13	37
2	Venezuela (VEN)	7	6	9	22
3	Argentina (ARG)	5	11	4	20
4	Colombia (COL)	2	3	4	9
5	Ecuador (ECU)	1	3	0	4
6	Chile (CHL)	1	2	0	3
7	Peru (PER)	0	2	1	3
8	Paraguay (PAR)	0	1	0	1
9	Suriname (SUR)	0	0	3	3
10	Panama (PAN)	0	0	1	1
Totals (10 entries)		34	34	35	103

== Open water medal standings ==
Rank	Nation	Gold	Silver	Bronze	Total
1	Brazil (BRA)	2	0	1	3
2	Chile (CHI)	1	0	1	2
3	Ecuador (ECU)	0	1	1	2
4	Argentina (ARG)	0	1	0	1
4	Venezuela (VEN)	0	1	0	1
Totals (5 entries)		3	3	3	9
