= Natalia de Luccas =

Brazilian swimmer (born 1996)

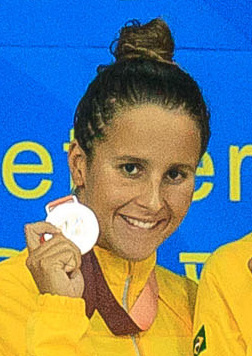
- Natalia de Luccas in 2015.

Personal information
- Full name: Natalia de Luccas
- Nationality: Brazil
- Born: September 13, 1996 (age 29) Limeira, São Paulo, Brazil
- Height: 167 cm (5 ft 6 in)
- Weight: 63 kg (139 lb)

Sport
- Sport: Swimming
- Strokes: Backstroke, freestyle
- Club: Corinthians
- Coach: Carlos Henrique Matheus
Medal record
Representing Brazil
Pan American Games
| Bronze medal – third place | 2015 Toronto | 4×100 m medley |
South American Games
| Bronze medal – third place | 2014 Santiago | 100 m backstroke |
| Bronze medal – third place | 2014 Santiago | 200 m backstroke |
Youth Olympic Games
| Silver medal – second place | 2014 Nanjing | Mixed 4×100 m free |

Natalia de Luccas (born September 13, 1996) is a Brazilian swimmer.

== International career ==
=== 2013–16 ===
She competed at the 2013 FINA World Junior Swimming Championships, in Dubai, United Arab Emirates, where she finished fifth in the 4×100 m freestyle relay, 10th in the 4×100 m medley relay, 10th in the mixed 4×100 m medley relay, 10th in the 100 m backstroke, 12th in the 100 m freestyle, 17th in the 200 m backstroke, and 19th in the 50 m backstroke.

On 5 December 2013, at the Júlio Delamare Trophy held in Rio de Janeiro, she broke the South American record in the 200 m backstroke, with a time of 2:12.09.

At the 2014 South American Games in Santiago, Chile, she won two bronze medals in the 100 m backstroke and in the 200 m backstroke.

At the 2014 Summer Youth Olympics in Nanjing, she won a silver medal in the mixed 4×100 m freestyle relay. She also finished fourth in the 100 m backstroke, fourth in the mixed 4×100 m medley relay, fifth in the 4×100 m freestyle relay, 10th in the 50 m backstroke and 16th in the 200 m backstroke.

At the 2015 Pan American Games in Toronto, Canada, she won a bronze medal in the 4×100 m medley relay, by participating at heats. She also finished ninth in the 100 m backstroke.

=== 2016 Summer Olympics ===
At the 2016 Summer Olympics, she competed in the Women's 4 × 100 metre medley relay, finishing 13th.
