= Swimming at the 2015 Pan American Games – Women's 100 metre backstroke =

Women's 100 metre backstroke at the 2015 Pan American Games
- Venue: CIBC Pan Am/Parapan Am Aquatics Centre and Field House
- Dates: July 17 (preliminaries and finals)
- Competitors: 19 from 13 nations
- Winning time: 59.61

Medalists
Gold medal	Etiene Medeiros	Brazil
Silver medal	Olivia Smoliga	United States
Bronze medal	Clara Smiddy	United States

The women's 100 metre backstroke competition of the swimming events at the 2015 Pan American Games took place on July 17 at the CIBC Pan Am/Parapan Am Aquatics Centre and Field House in Toronto, Canada. The defending Pan American Games champion was Rachel Bootsma of the United States.

This race consisted of two lengths of the pool, both lengths in backstroke. The top eight swimmers from the heats would qualify for the A final (where the medals would be awarded), while the next eight swimmers would qualify for the B final.

== Records ==
Prior to this competition, the existing world and Pan American Games records were as follows:

World record	Gemma Spofforth (GBR)	58.12	Rome, Italy	July 28, 2009
Pan American Games record	Rachel Bootsma (USA)	1:00.37	Guadalajara, Mexico	October 16, 2011

The following new records were set during this competition.

Date	Event	Name	Nationality	Time	Record
17 July	Heat 3	Olivia Smoliga	United States	1:00.35	GR
17 July	A Final	Etiene Medeiros	Brazil	59.61	GR

== Qualification ==
Each National Olympic Committee (NOC) was able to enter up to two entrants providing they had met the A standard (1:04.09) in the qualifying period (January 1, 2014 to May 1, 2015). NOCs were also permitted to enter one athlete providing they had met the B standard (1:07.94) in the same qualifying period. All other competing athletes were entered as universality spots.

== Schedule ==
All times are Eastern Time Zone (UTC-4).

Date	Time	Round
July 17, 2015	10:05	Heats
July 17, 2015	19:09	Final B
July 17, 2015	19:14	Final A

== Results ==
KEY:	q	Fastest non-qualifiers	Q	Qualified	GR	Games record	NR	National record	PB	Personal best	SB	Seasonal best

=== Heats ===
The first round was held on July 17.

Rank	Heat	Lane	Name	Nationality	Time	Notes
1	3	5	Olivia Smoliga	United States	1:00.35	QA, GR
2	3	4	Dominique Bouchard	Canada	1:00.44	QA
3	1	4	Etiene Medeiros	Brazil	1:00.74	QA
4	1	5	Clara Smiddy	United States	1:00.79	QA
5	2	4	Hilary Caldwell	Canada	1:00.97	QA
6	1	6	Gisela Morales	Guatemala	1:00.99	QA
7	2	3	Maria González	Mexico	1:01.25	QA
8	2	5	Andrea Berrino	Argentina	1:01.32	QA
9	3	3	Natalia de Luccas	Brazil	1:01.89	QB
10	3	6	Carolina Colorado	Colombia	1:02.10	QB
11	1	3	Isabella Arcila	Colombia	1:02.62	QB
12	2	6	Estela Davis	Mexico	1:03.36	QB
13	2	7	Carla González	Venezuela	1:04.09	QB
14	1	2	Karen Vilorio	Honduras	1:04.29	QB
15	3	2	Florencia Perotti	Argentina	1:04.81	QB
16	2	2	McKenna DeBever	Peru	1:05.00	QB
17	3	7	Inés Remersaro	Uruguay	1:05.21	
18	1	7	Sharon Bravo	Ecuador	1:08.36	
19	3	1	Jamaris Washshah	Virgin Islands	1:10.50	

=== B Final ===
The B final was also held on July 17.

Rank	Lane	Name	Nationality	Time	Notes
9	4	Natalia de Luccas	Brazil	1:02.15	
10	5	Carolina Colorado	Colombia	1:02.16	
11	3	Isabella Arcila	Colombia	1:02.44	
12	6	Estela Davis	Mexico	1:03.19	
13	2	Carla González	Venezuela	1:03.68	
14	7	Karen Vilorio	Honduras	1:05.06	
15	1	Florencia Perotti	Argentina	1:05.18	
16	8	Inés Remersaro	Uruguay	1:05.78	

=== A Final ===
The A final was also held on July 17. Medeiros won the first gold medal in the history of Brazilian women's swimming at Pan American Games.

Rank	Lane	Name	Nationality	Time	Notes
1st place, gold medalist(s)	3	Etiene Medeiros	Brazil	59.61	GR, SA
2nd place, silver medalist(s)	4	Olivia Smoliga	United States	1:00.06	
3rd place, bronze medalist(s)	6	Clara Smiddy	United States	1:00.49	
4	5	Dominique Bouchard	Canada	1:00.54	
5	2	Hilary Caldwell	Canada	1:01.01	
6	1	Maria González	Mexico	1:01.06	
7	7	Gisela Morales	Guatemala	1:01.31	
8	8	Andrea Berrino	Argentina	1:01.76	
