= Larissa Oliveira =

Brazilian swimmer (born 1993)

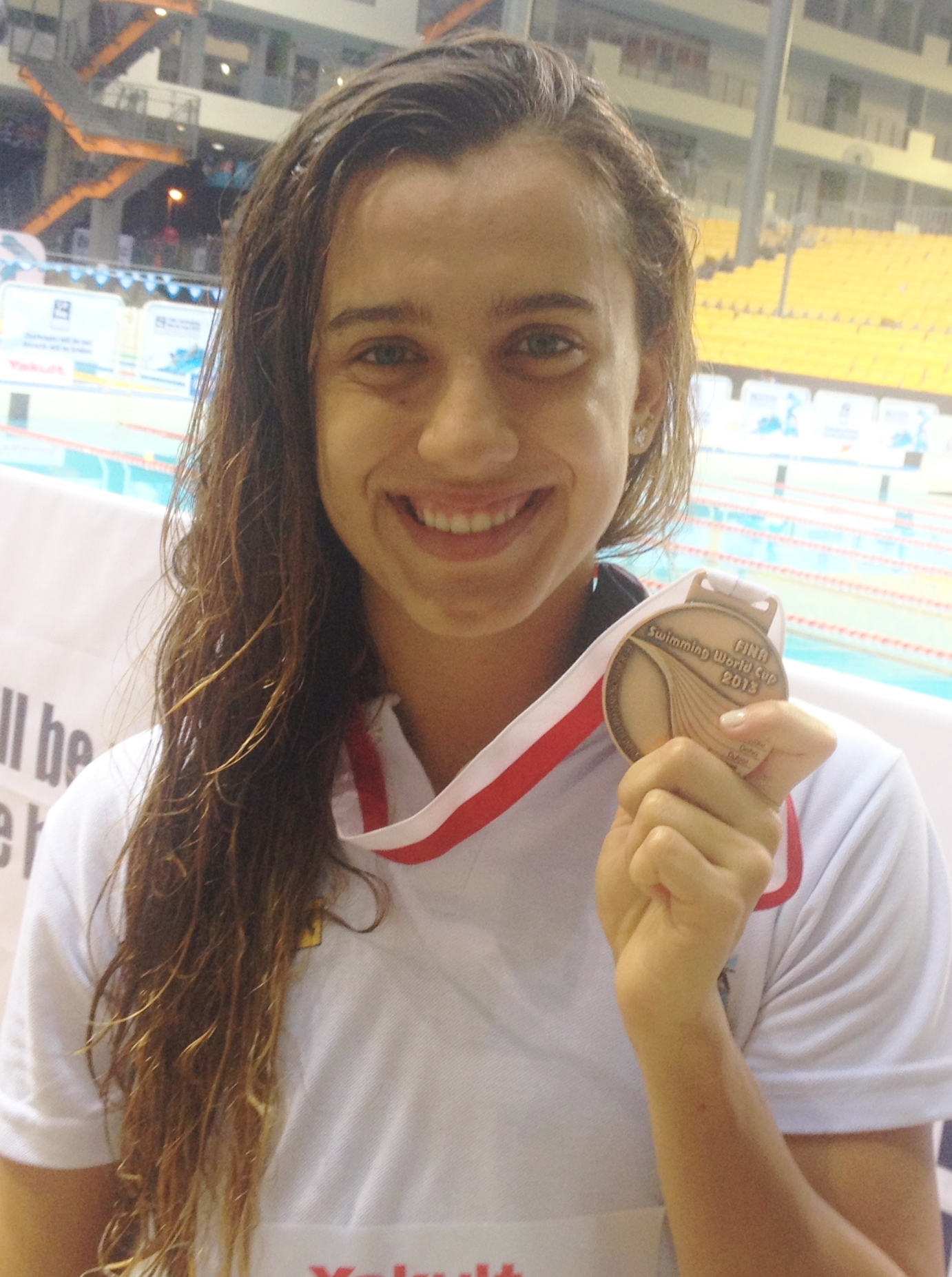
- Larissa Oliveira in 2013

Personal information
- Full name: Larissa Martins de Oliveira
- National team: Brazil
- Born: 16 February 1993 (age 33) Juiz de Fora, Minas Gerais, Brazil
- Height: 1.68 m (5 ft 6 in)
- Weight: 56 kg (123 lb)

Sport
- Sport: Swimming
- Strokes: Freestyle
Medal record
Women's swimming
Representing Brazil
World Championships (SC)
Gold medal – first place	2014 Doha	4×50 m mixed medley
Silver medal – second place	2016 Windsor	4×50 m mixed medley
Bronze medal – third place	2014 Doha	4×50 m mixed freestyle
Pan American Games
Gold medal – first place	2019 Lima	4×100 m mixed medley
Silver medal – second place	2015 Toronto	4×200 m freestyle
Silver medal – second place	2019 Lima	4×100 m freestyle
Silver medal – second place	2019 Lima	4×100 m mixed freestyle
Bronze medal – third place	2015 Toronto	4×100 m freestyle
Bronze medal – third place	2015 Toronto	4×100 m medley
Bronze medal – third place	2019 Lima	100 m freestyle
Bronze medal – third place	2019 Lima	200 m freestyle
Bronze medal – third place	2019 Lima	4×200 m freestyle
Bronze medal – third place	2019 Lima	4×100 m medley
South American Games
Gold medal – first place	2014 Santiago	100 m freestyle
Gold medal – first place	2014 Santiago	4×100 m freestyle
Gold medal – first place	2014 Santiago	4×200 m freestyle
Gold medal – first place	2014 Santiago	4×100 m medley

Larissa Martins de Oliveira (born 16 February 1993) is a Brazilian former freestyle swimmer.

== International career ==
=== 2012–16 ===
At the 2012 FINA World Swimming Championships (25 m) in Istanbul, she finished 6th in the 4×100-metre freestyle final, 10th in the 4×100-metre medley, 12th in the 100-metre freestyle semifinal, and 38th in the 200-metre freestyle. Oliveira broke the South American record in the 4×100-metre medley, with a time of 3:57.66, along with Fabíola Molina, Daynara de Paula and Beatriz Travalon.

She classified to swim at three proofs in the 2013 World Aquatics Championships in Barcelona. In the 4×100-metre freestyle, she broke the South American record, with a time of 3:41.05, along with Daynara de Paula, Graciele Herrmann and Alessandra Marchioro. The Brazilian team finished in 11th place and did not advance to the final. She also finished 10th in the 4×200-metre freestyle, along with Jéssica Cavalheiro, Carolina Bilich and Manuella Lyrio, and 12th in the 4×100-metre medley, along with Etiene Medeiros, Beatriz Travalon and Daynara de Paula.

On 3 September 2014, participating in the José Finkel Trophy (short course competition) in Guaratinguetá, she broke the South American record in the 4x200-metre freestyle with a time of 7:58.54, along with Gabrielle Roncatto, Aline Rodrigues and Daniele de Jesus. On 6 September, she broke the South American record in the 100-metre freestyle with a time of 52.88.

At the 2014 FINA World Swimming Championships (25 m) in Doha, Qatar, Oliveira won her first medal by winning gold in the 4 × 50 metre mixed medley relay, along with Nicholas Santos, Etiene Medeiros and Felipe França Silva, breaking the South American record with a time of 1:37.26, only 0.09 seconds from beating USA's world record (1:37.17). Her second medal was a bronze in the 4 × 50 metre mixed freestyle relay (formed by Oliveira, João de Lucca, Etiene Medeiros and César Cielo), where Brazil broke the South American record with a time of 1:29.17, only 4 hundredths slower than Russia, which won the silver medal. Oliveira also participated in other finals: she finished 5th in the Women's 4 × 50 metre medley relay (1:46.47, South American record) along with Etiene Medeiros, Ana Carla Carvalho and Daynara de Paula; and finished 7th in the Women's 4 × 100 metre freestyle relay (3:33.93, South American record), and 8th in the Women's 4 × 50 metre freestyle relay (1:38.78, South American record), both relays formed by Larissa, Daiane Oliveira, Alessandra Marchioro and Daynara de Paula. Oliveira's other results were the 10th place in the Women's 100 metre freestyle (breaking the South American record in the semifinals, with a time of 52.75), the 14th place in the Women's 50 metre freestyle, and the 20th place in the Women's 200 metre freestyle.

At the Brazilian Open, in Rio de Janeiro, she broke the South American record in the 100-metre freestyle with a time of 54.61.

In April 2015, participating in the Maria Lenk Trophy in Rio de Janeiro, she broke the South American record in the 200-metre freestyle with a time of 1:58.53, and in the 4 × 200 metre freestyle relay with a time of 8:03.22, along with Joanna Maranhão, Manuella Lyrio and Gabrielle Roncatto.

At the 2015 Pan American Games in Toronto, Ontario, Canada, Oliveira won three medals in three Brazilian relays: a silver medal in the 4 × 200 metre freestyle relay, breaking the South American record, with a time of 7:56.36, along with Manuella Lyrio, Jéssica Cavalheiro and Joanna Maranhão; and two bronze medals in the 4 × 100 metre freestyle relay (this, breaking the South American record, with a time of 3:37.39) and 4 × 100 metre medley relay. She also finished 5th in the Women's 100 metre freestyle (equaling her South American record of 54.61) and 5th in the Women's 200 metre freestyle.

At the 2015 World Aquatics Championships in Kazan, she finished 6th in the 4 × 100 metre mixed freestyle relay, along with Matheus Santana, Bruno Fratus and Daynara de Paula, breaking the South American record with a time of 3:25.58; 10th in the Women's 4 × 200 metre freestyle relay; 11th in the Women's 4 × 100 metre freestyle relay; 14th in the Women's 4 × 100 metre medley relay; 19th in the Women's 100 metre freestyle, and 27th in the Women's 200 metre freestyle.

In April 2016, at the Maria Lenk Trophy tournament held in Rio de Janeiro, Oliveira broke the South American record in the 100-metre freestyle, with a time of 54.03, and in the 200-metre freestyle, with a time of 1:57.37.

=== 2016 Summer Olympics ===
At the 2016 Summer Olympics, she finished 21st in the Women's 100 metre freestyle, 35th in the Women's 200 metre freestyle, 11th in the Women's 4 × 100 metre freestyle relay, and 13th in the Women's 4 × 100 metre medley relay. In the Women's 4 × 200 metre freestyle relay, she broke the South American record, with a time of 7:55.68, along with Jéssica Cavalheiro, Gabrielle Roncatto and Manuella Lyrio, finishing 11th.

=== 2016–20 ===
In September 2016, at the José Finkel Trophy (short course competition), she broke the South American record in the 4×200-metre freestyle relay, with a time of 7:52.71, along with Joanna Maranhão, Aline Rodrigues and Manuella Lyrio.

At the 2016 FINA World Swimming Championships (25 m) in Windsor, Ontario, she won a silver medal at the 4 × 50 metre mixed medley relay, along with Etiene Medeiros, Felipe Lima and Nicholas Santos. She also finished 20th in the Women's 50 metre freestyle, 15th in the Women's 100 metre freestyle, and 13th in the Women's 200 metre freestyle.

On 9 March 2017, a tree fell in her car and struck her thigh, causing a very serious injury. Almost four months later, she returned to compete.

At the 2018 José Finkel Trophy (short course), she broke the South American record in the 100-metre freestyle (52.45) and 200-metre freestyle (1:54.50).

At the 2018 FINA World Swimming Championships (25 m) in Hangzhou, China, she finished 5th in the Mixed 4 × 50 metre freestyle relay, 9th in the Mixed 4 × 50 metre medley relay, 11th in the Women's 100 metre freestyle and 11th in the Women's 200 metre freestyle. She chose not to swim the Women's 50 metre freestyle.

At the 2019 Pan American Games held in Lima, Peru, Oliveira won the notable number of 7 medals in the competition, entering the list of the biggest medalists in Brazil in Pan-American history. She got her first gold in Pans (Mixed 4 × 100 metre medley relay), got her first individual medals (bronze in Women's 100 metre freestyle and Women's 200 metre freestyle), and won 2 silver in Women's 4 × 100 metre freestyle relay and Mixed 4 × 100 metre freestyle relay, and 2 bronzes in Women's 4 × 200 metre freestyle relay and Women's 4 × 100 metre medley relay.

She retired from swimming in December 2022.

== Personal bests ==
Larissa Oliveira is the current holder, or former holder, of the following records:

Long Course (50 meters):

- South American record holder of the 100m freestyle: 54.03, time obtained on 19 April 2016
- South American record holder of the 200m freestyle: 1:57.37, time obtained on 17 April 2016
- South American record holder of the 4 × 100 m freestyle: 3:37.39, time obtained on 14 July 2015, with Graciele Herrmann, Etiene Medeiros and Daynara de Paula
- South American record holder of the 4 × 200 m freestyle: 7:55.68, time obtained on 6 August 2016, with Jéssica Cavalheiro, Manuella Lyrio and Gabrielle Roncatto
- South American record holder of the 4 × 100 m mixed free: 3:25.58, time obtained on 8 August 2015, with Matheus Santana, Bruno Fratus and Daynara de Paula
- South American record holder of the 4 × 100 m mixed medley: 3:47.99, time obtained on 13 December 2017, with Leonardo de Deus, Pedro Cardona and Daiene Dias

Short course (25 meters):

- South American record holder of the 100m freestyle: 52.45, time obtained on 26 August 2018
- South American record holder of the 200m freestyle: 1:54.50, time obtained on 27 August 2018
- South American record holder of the 4x50m freestyle: 1:38.78, time obtained on 7 December 2014, with Daynara de Paula, Daiane Oliveira and Alessandra Marchioro
- South American record holder of the 4 × 100 m freestyle: 3:33.93, time obtained on 5 December 2014, with Daynara de Paula, Daiane Oliveira and Alessandra Marchioro
- Former South American record holder of the 4 × 200 m freestyle: 7:58.84, time obtained on 3 September 2014, with Gabriele Roncatto, Aline Rodrigues and Daniele de Jesus
- South American record holder of the 4x50m medley: 1:46.47, time obtained on 5 December 2014, with Ana Carla Carvalho, Daynara de Paula and Etiene Medeiros
- South American record holder of the 4 × 100 m medley: 3:57.66, time obtained on 14 December 2012, with Fabíola Molina, Beatriz Travalon and Daynara de Paula
- South American record holder of the 4x50m mixed freestyle: 1:29.17, time obtained on 6 December 2014, with César Cielo, João de Lucca and Etiene Medeiros
- South American record holder of the 4x50m mixed medley: 1:37.26, time obtained on 4 December 2014, with Nicholas Santos, Etiene Medeiros and Felipe França Silva
