= Jéssica Cavalheiro =

Brazilian swimmer (born 1991)

Personal information
- Full name: Jéssica Bruin Cavalheiro
- Nickname: Jiba
- Nationality: Brazil
- Born: August 1, 1991 (age 34) Belo Horizonte, Minas Gerais, Brazil
- Height: 1.64 m (5 ft 5 in)
- Weight: 58 kg (128 lb)

Sport
- Sport: Swimming
- Strokes: Freestyle
- Club: SESI-SP
Medal record
Women's swimming
Representing Brazil
Pan American Games
Silver medal – second place	2011 Guadalajara	4x200 m freestyle
Silver medal – second place	2015 Toronto	4×200 m freestyle
South American Games
Gold medal – first place	2014 Santiago	4x200 m freestyle
Bronze medal – third place	2014 Santiago	200 m freestyle

Jéssica Bruin Cavalheiro (born August 1, 1991 in Belo Horizonte, Minas Gerais, Brazil), is a Brazilian Olympic swimmer.

== International career ==
=== 2011–12 ===
Integrating Brazil national delegation that disputed the 2011 Pan American Games in Guadalajara, Mexico, won the silver medal in the 4×200-metre freestyle relay. She was also in the 200-metre freestyle final, finishing in 6th place.

=== 2013–16 ===
At the 2013 World Aquatics Championships in Barcelona, she finished 10th in the 4×200-metre freestyle, along with Manuella Lyrio, Carolina Bilich and Larissa Oliveira.

At the 2014 FINA World Swimming Championships (25 m) in Doha, Qatar, Cavalheiro finished 18th in the Women's 400 metre freestyle and 23rd in the Women's 200 metre freestyle.

At the 2015 Pan American Games in Toronto, Ontario, Canada, Cavalheiro won the silver medal in the 4 × 200 metre freestyle relay, breaking the South American record, with a time of 7:56.36, along with Larissa Oliveira, Manuella Lyrio and Joanna Maranhão.

At the 2015 World Aquatics Championships in Kazan, Cavalheiro finished 10th in the Women's 4 × 200 metre freestyle relay, along with Manuella Lyrio, Joanna Maranhão and Larissa Oliveira.

=== 2016 Summer Olympics ===
At the 2016 Summer Olympics, in the Women's 4 × 200 metre freestyle relay, she broke the South American record, with a time of 7:55.68, along with Manuella Lyrio, Gabrielle Roncatto and Larissa Oliveira, finishing 11th.
