= Swimming at the 2019 Pan American Games – Women's 4 × 100 metre freestyle relay =

Women's 4 × 100 metre freestyle relay at the 2019 Pan American Games
- Venue: Villa Deportiva Nacional, VIDENA
- Dates: August 6 (Final)
- Competitors: 32 from 8 nations
- Winning time: 3:39.59

Medalists
Gold medal	Lia Neal; Claire Rasmus; Kendyl Stewart; Margo Geer	United States
Silver medal	Etiene Medeiros; Larissa Oliveira; Manuella Lyrio; Daynara de Paula	Brazil
Bronze medal	Alyson Ackman; Kyla Leibel; Katerine Savard; Alexia Zevnik	Canada

The women's 4 × 100 metre freestyle relay competition of the swimming events at the 2019 Pan American Games are scheduled to be held August 6, 2019 at the Villa Deportiva Nacional Videna cluster.

== Records ==
Prior to this competition, the existing world and Pan American Games records were as follows:

World record	Australia (AUS); Shayna Jack (54.03); Bronte Campbell (52.03); Emma McKeon (52.99); Cate Campbell (51.00)	3:30.05	Gold Coast, Australia	April 5, 2018
Pan American Games record	Canada (CAN); Sandrine Mainville (54.43); Michelle Toro (54.42); Katerine Savard (54.53); Chantal van Landeghem (53.42)	3:36.80	Toronto, Canada	July 14, 2015

== Results ==
KEY:	q	Fastest non-qualifiers	Q	Qualified	GR	Games record	NR	National record	PB	Personal best	SB	Seasonal best

=== Final ===
The final round was held on August 6.

Rank	Lane	Names	Nationality	Time	Notes
1st place, gold medalist(s)	4	Lia Neal (55.67); Claire Rasmus (54.51); Kendyl Stewart (55.05); Margo Geer (54.36)	United States	3:39.59	
2nd place, silver medalist(s)	3	Etiene Medeiros (55.54); Larissa Oliveira (54.46); Manuella Lyrio (55.28); Daynara de Paula (55.11)	Brazil	3:40.39	
3rd place, bronze medalist(s)	5	Alyson Ackman (55.79); Kyla Leibel (55.75); Katerine Savard (55.44); Alexia Zevnik (54.03)	Canada	3:41.01	
4	6	Andrea Santander (58.73); Fabiana Pesce (59.29); Carla González (58.21); Jeserik Pinto (57.66)	Venezuela	3:53.89	
5	1	McKenna DeBever (57.06); Rafaela Fernandini (59.29); Alexia Sotomayor (59.54); Jessica Cattaneo (58.81)	Peru	3:54.70	
6	7	Ariel Weech (59.19); Lillian Higgs (59.31); Margaret Higgs (58.80); Laura Morley (59.38)	Bahamas	3:56.68	
7	8	Ireyra Tamayo (59.66); Emily Santos (1:04.83); Nimia Murua (1:00.55); Catherine Cooper (1:00.12)	Panama	4:05.16	
	2	Tayde Revilak (57.93); Athena Meneses; María Mata; Monika González	Mexico	DSQ	
