= Samantha Harding =

Canadian swimmer

Personal information
- Born: May 31, 1994 (age 32) Brandon, Manitoba, Canada
- Height: 5 ft 10 in (178 cm)
- Weight: 140 lb (64 kg)

Sport
- Country: Canada
- Sport: Swimming
- Strokes: Freestyle

Samantha Harding (born May 31, 1994) is a Canadian long-distance swimmer from Brandon, Manitoba. She won a silver medal in the 10 km event at the 2015 FINA World Cup Cozumel, Mexico. She finished 7th at the 2015 Pan American Games.
