= Swimming at the 2010 South American Games – Women's 200 metre backstroke =

The Women's 200m backstroke event at the 2010 South American Games was held on March 27, with the heats at 10:35 and the Final at 18:10.

== Medalists ==
Gold	Silver	Bronze
Fernanda Alvarenga; Brazil	Isabella Arcila; Colombia	Georgina Bardach; Argentina

== Records ==
Standing records prior to the 2010 South American Games
World record	Kirsty Coventry (ZIM)	2:04.81	Rome, Italy	1 August 2009
Competition Record	Georgina Bardach (ARG)	2:17.82	Buenos Aires, Argentina	16 November 2006
South American record	Fernanda Alvarenga (BRA)	2:12.32	Rio de Janeiro, Brazil	7 May 2009

== Results ==
=== Heats ===
Rank	Heat	Lane	Athlete	Result	Notes
1	2	4	Georgina Bardach (ARG)	2:20.58	Q
2	2	3	Isabella Arcila (COL)	2:20.77	Q
3	3	4	Fernanda Alvarenga (BRA)	2:21.32	Q
4	3	3	Erika Stewart (COL)	2:22.70	Q
5	1	3	Jeserik Pinto (VEN)	2:23.78	Q
6	2	6	Carolina Alejandra Muro (PER)	2:24.61	Q
7	3	2	Ines Remersaro (URU)	2:25.99	Q
8	1	7	Elimar Barrios (VEN)	2:26.63	Q
9	2	5	Nicole Maria Gilbert (ECU)	2:27.22	
10	2	2	Adriana Jimena Tejada (PER)	2:28.76	
11	1	6	Maria Virginia Franco (PAR)	2:28.88	
12	3	6	Diana An Yu Ibarra (ECU)	2:28.89	
13	1	4	Florencia Perotti (ARG)	2:32.53	
14	3	7	Mariana Vaca Diez (BOL)	2:34.09	
15	1	2	Andrea Maria Ramirez (PAR)	2:35.24	
	1	5	Eliana Barrios (VEN)	DNS	
	3	5	Fabíola Molina (BRA)	DNS	
	2	7	Chandel Domaso (SUR)	DSQ	

=== Final ===
Rank	Lane	Athlete	Result	Notes
1st place, gold medalist(s)	3	Fernanda Alvarenga (BRA)	2:18.61	
2nd place, silver medalist(s)	5	Isabella Arcila (COL)	2:19.11	
3rd place, bronze medalist(s)	4	Georgina Bardach (ARG)	2:19.13	
4	6	Erika Stewart (COL)	2:19.55	
5	8	Elimar Barrios (VEN)	2:23.56	
6	2	Jeserik Pinto (VEN)	2:23.76	
7	1	Ines Remersaro (URU)	2:23.91	
8	7	Carolina Alejandra Muro (PER)	2:24.18	
