= Manuella Lyrio =

Brazilian swimmer (born 1989)

Personal information
- Full name: Manuella Duarte Lyrio
- Born: July 27, 1989 (age 36) Brasília, DF, Brazil
- Height: 1.63 m (5 ft 4 in)
- Weight: 55 kg (121 lb)

Sport
- Sport: Swimming
- Strokes: Freestyle
Medal record
Women's swimming
Representing Brazil
Pan American Games
Gold medal – first place	2019 Lima	4×100 m mixed medley
Silver medal – second place	2011 Guadalajara	4x200 m freestyle
Silver medal – second place	2015 Toronto	4×200 m freestyle
Silver medal – second place	2019 Lima	4×100 m freestyle
Bronze medal – third place	2007 Rio	4x200 m freestyle
Bronze medal – third place	2015 Toronto	200 m freestyle
Bronze medal – third place	2015 Toronto	4×100 m freestyle
Bronze medal – third place	2019 Lima	4×200 m freestyle
Bronze medal – third place	2019 Lima	4×100 m medley
South American Games
Gold medal – first place	2014 Santiago	4x200 m freestyle
Bronze medal – third place	2014 Santiago	400 m freestyle

Manuella Duarte Lyrio (born July 27, 1989) is a Brazilian competitive swimmer.

== International career ==
=== 2005–08 ===
On September 9, 2005, at 16 years old, Lyrio broke the short-course South American record in the 4x200-metre freestyle relay, with a time of 8:01.78, along with Paula Baracho, Tatiana Lemos and Joanna Maranhão.

At the 2007 Pan American Games, in Rio de Janeiro, Manuella got the bronze in the 4x200-metre freestyle, along with Monique Ferreira, Tatiana Lemos and Paula Baracho.

=== 2009–12 ===
She was at the 2010 Pan Pacific Swimming Championships in Irvine, where she finished 6th in the 4x200-metre freestyle, 23rd in the 400-metre freestyle, 28th in the 200-metre freestyle and 49th in the 100-metre freestyle.

Integrating Brazil national delegation that disputed the 2011 Pan American Games in Guadalajara, Mexico, Lyrio won the silver medal in the 4x200-metre freestyle relay., and ranked 10th in the 400-metre freestyle.

On March 14, 2012, she broke the 400-metre freestyle Brazilian record, with a time of 4:12.14.

On October 14, 2012, Manuella broke the 400-metre freestyle Brazilian record at short course, with a time of 4:06.57.

=== 2003–16 ===
At the 2013 World Aquatics Championships in Barcelona, she finished 22nd in the 200m freestyle, breaking the South American record, with a time of 1:59.52. She also finished 10th in the 4 × 200 m freestyle, along with Jéssica Cavalheiro, Carolina Bilich and Larissa Oliveira.

At the 2014 FINA World Swimming Championships (25 m) in Doha, Qatar, Lyrio finished 23rd in the Women's 400 metre freestyle. She also swam the heats of the Women's 4 × 50 metre freestyle relay.

In April 2015, participating in the Maria Lenk Trophy in Rio de Janeiro, she broke the South American record in the 4 × 200 metre freestyle relay with a time of 8:03.22, along with Joanna Maranhão, Larissa Oliveira and Gabrielle Roncatto.

At the 2015 Pan American Games in Toronto, Ontario, Canada, Lyrio began earning a bronze medal in the 4 × 100 metre freestyle relay, by participating at heats. She also finished 9th in the 200 metre butterfly. On the second day, Lyrio won an unprecedented bronze medal in the 200 metre freestyle, breaking the South American record, with a time of 1:58.03. On the third day, she won the silver medal in the 4 × 200 metre freestyle relay, breaking the South American record, with a time of 7:56.36, along with Larissa Oliveira, Jéssica Cavalheiro and Joanna Maranhão. On the fourth day, she finished 4th in the 400 metre freestyle, breaking the Brazilian record, with a time of 4:10.92.

At the 2015 World Aquatics Championships in Kazan, Lyrio finished 10th in the Women's 4 × 200 metre freestyle relay, along with Jéssica Cavalheiro, Joanna Maranhão and Larissa Oliveira; 15th in the Women's 200 metre freestyle.; and 16th in the Women's 400 metre freestyle, breaking again the Brazilian record, with a time of 4:10.57

In December 2015, at the Open tournament held in Palhoça, Lyrio broke the Brazilian record in the 400-metre freestyle, with a time of 4:09.96.

In April 2016, at the Maria Lenk Trophy tournament held in Rio de Janeiro, Lyrio broke the Brazilian record in the 400-metre freestyle, with a time of 4:09.48.

=== 2016 Summer Olympics ===
At the 2016 Summer Olympics, she broke the South American record in the Women's 200 metre freestyle heats, with a time of 1:57.28. She finished 12th in the semifinals. Nevertheless, she entered in the Brazil's swimming history, because never a Brazilian woman had managed to get in a semifinal of this proof. In the Women's 4 × 200 metre freestyle relay, she broke the South American record, with a time of 7:55.68, along with Jéssica Cavalheiro, Gabrielle Roncatto and Larissa Oliveira, finishing 11th. She also competed in the Women's 4 × 100 metre freestyle relay, finishing 11th.

=== 2016–20 ===
On September 12, 2016, at the José Finkel Trophy (short course competition), she broke twice the South American record in the 200-metre freestyle, with a time of 1:55.90 at heats and 1:54.76 in the final. She also broke the South American record in the 4×200-metre freestyle relay, with a time of 7:52.71, along with Joanna Maranhão, Aline Rodrigues and Larissa Oliveira.

At the 2016 FINA World Swimming Championships (25 m) in Windsor, Ontario, she went to the Women's 200 metre freestyle final, finishing 8th. She also finished 40th in the Women's 100 metre freestyle.

At the 2017 World Aquatics Championships in Budapest, she finished 22nd in the Women's 100 metre freestyle and 21st in the Women's 200 metre freestyle.

At the 2018 FINA World Swimming Championships (25 m) in Hangzhou, China, she finished 9th in the Women's 200 metre freestyle and 21st in the Women's 100 metre freestyle.

At the 2019 Pan American Games held in Lima, Peru, Lyrio won four medals in the Brazilian relays: two of them, swimming in the finals - silver in the Women's 4 × 100 metre freestyle relay and bronze in the Women's 4 × 200 metre freestyle relay, and two by participating at heats: gold in the Mixed 4 × 100 metre medley relay, and bronze in the Women's 4 × 100 metre medley relay. She also finished 6th in the Women's 200 metre freestyle.
