= Swimming at the 2010 South American Games – Women's 100 metre backstroke =

The Women's 100m backstroke event at the 2010 South American Games was held on March 29, with the heats at 10:35 and the Final at 18:10.

== Medalists ==
Gold	Silver	Bronze
Fabíola Molina; Brazil	Carolina Colorado Henao; Colombia	Jeserik Pinto; Venezuela

== Records ==
Standing records prior to the 2010 South American Games
World record	Gemma Spofforth (GBR)	58.12	Rome, Italy	28 July 2009
Competition Record	Talita Lima (BRA)	1:04.39	Belém, Brazil	2002
South American record	Fabíola Molina (BRA)	1:00.07	Rome, Italy	1 August 2009

== Results ==
=== Heats ===
Rank	Heat	Lane	Athlete	Result	Notes
1	2	4	Carolina Colorado Henao (COL)	1:03.17	Q CR
2	3	4	Fabíola Molina (BRA)	1:04.27	Q
3	1	4	Fernanda Alvarenga (BRA)	1:05.14	Q
4	1	5	Jeserik Pinto (VEN)	1:05.28	Q
5	3	3	Erika Stewart (COL)	1:05.31	Q
6	2	6	Elimar Barrios (VEN)	1:06.00	Q
7	2	5	Cecilia Bertoncello (ARG)	1:06.89	Q
7	1	6	Massie Carrillo Yong (PER)	1:07.12	Q
9	1	3	Diana An Yu Ibarra (ECU)	1:07.13	
10	1	2	Ines Remersaro (URU)	1:07.63	
11	3	5	Florencia Perotti (ARG)	1:07.76	
12	2	2	Maria Laura Britez (PAR)	1:07.95	
13	2	3	Nicole Maria Gilbert (ECU)	1:08.78	
14	3	2	Carolina Aguilar Muro (PER)	1:09.45	
15	3	1	Chandel Domaso (SUR)	1:10.21	
16	3	7	Karen Milenka Guzman (BOL)	1:11.17	
17	1	7	Mariana Vaca Diez (BOL)	1:12.89	
18	2	7	Carolina Pfeifer (CHI)	1:13.19	
	2	1	Naomi Korstanje (AHO)	DNS	
	3	6	Maria Virginia FRanco (PAR)	DSQ	

=== Final ===
Rank	Lane	Athlete	Result	Notes
1st place, gold medalist(s)	5	Fabíola Molina (BRA)	1:01.65	CR
2nd place, silver medalist(s)	4	Carolina Colorado Henao (COL)	1:02.77	
3rd place, bronze medalist(s)	6	Jeserik Pinto (VEN)	1:04.21	
4	3	Fernanda Alvarenga (BRA)	1:04.73	
5	2	Erika Stewart (COL)	1:05.07	
6	7	Elimar Barrios (VEN)	1:05.31	
7	8	Massie Milagros Yong (PER)	1:06.83	
8	1	Cecilia Bertoncello (ARG)	1:07.48	
