= Samantha Arévalo =

Ecuadorian swimmer (born 1994)

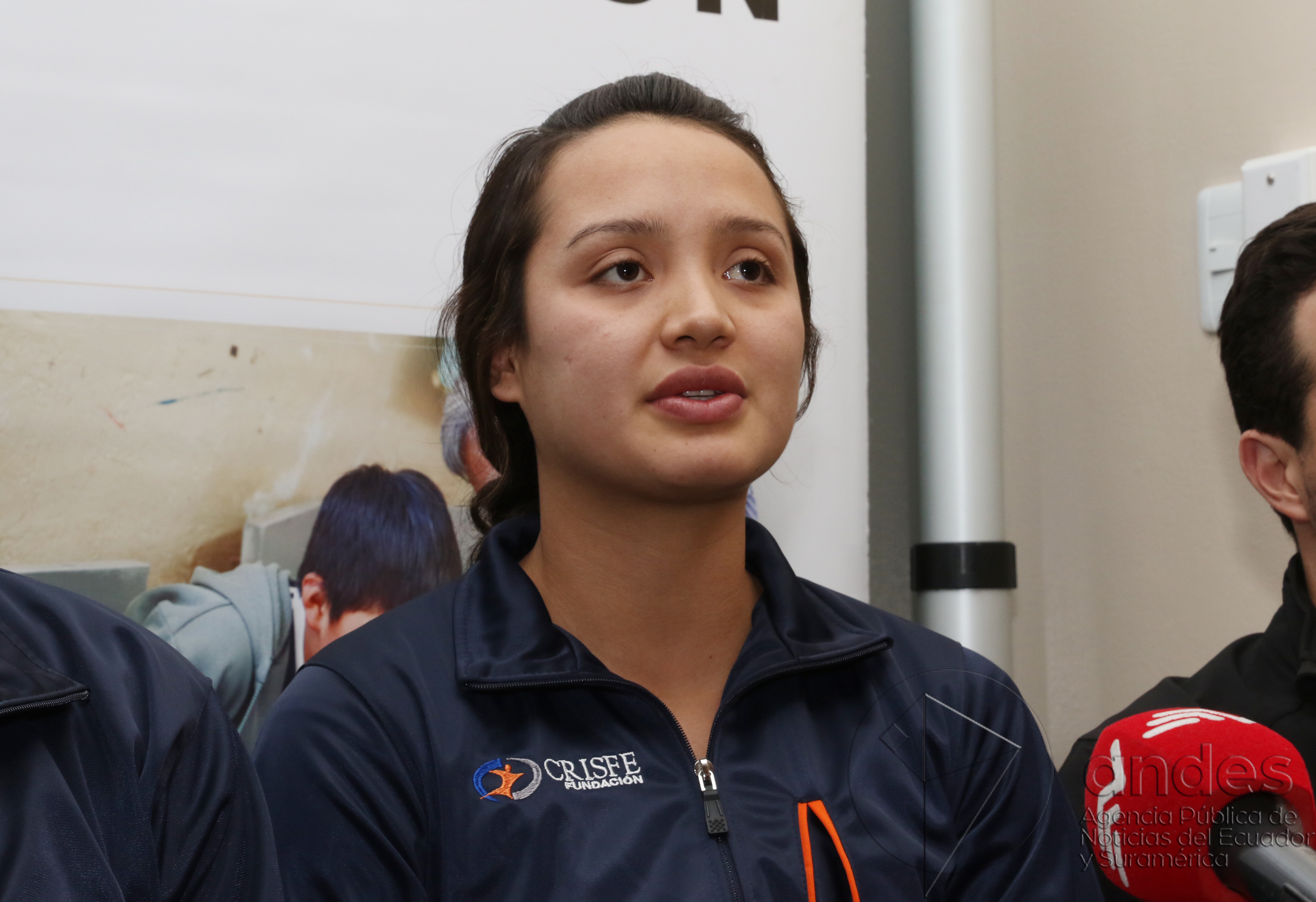

Personal information
- Full name: Samantha Michelle Arévalo Salinas
- Born: September 30, 1994 (age 31) Cuenca, Ecuador
- Height: 1.68 m (5 ft 6 in)
- Weight: 58 kg (128 lb)

Sport
- Sport: Swimming
- Strokes: Freestyle, Medley
Medal record
Women's swimming
Representing Ecuador
World Championships
Silver medal – second place	2017 Budapest	10 km open water
Pan American Games
Bronze medal – third place	2015 Toronto	10 km open water
South American Games
Silver medal – second place	2014 Santiago	1500 m freestyle
Silver medal – second place	2014 Santiago	3 km team
Bronze medal – third place	2010 Medellín	400 m medley

Samantha Michelle Arévalo Salinas (born September 30, 1994) is an Ecuadorian swimmer. At the 2012 Summer Olympics, she competed in the Women's 800 metre freestyle, finishing in 29th place overall in the heats, failing to qualify for the final. She trains in Rome, Italy.

== Career ==
=== 2013 Bolivarian Games ===
participated in the open water competition in the Trujillo 2013 Bolivarian Games with her training partner Ivan Enderica. Samantha won a gold medal with a time of 2:08:33. Due to the low temperatures of the lake, many participants withdrew because of hypothermia.

=== Toronto 2015 ===
At first it was announced that the Ecuadorian swimmer won the Pan American gold, but after analyzing the results, Samantha Arévalo was left with the bronze medal for a tenth of a second. The winner was the American Eva Fabian with a time of 2: 03: 17.0. Samantha, finished with a time of 2: 03: 167.1.

In 2019, she competed in the women's marathon 10 kilometres at the 2019 Pan American Games held in Lima, Peru. She did not finish her race.
