= Sarah Correa =

Brazilian swimmer (1992–2015)

Personal information
- Full name: Sarah Gonçalves Correa
- Born: August 14, 1992 Rio de Janeiro, Rio de Janeiro, Brazil
- Died: May 2, 2015 (aged 22) Rio de Janeiro, Brazil
- Height: 1.76 m (5 ft 9 in)
- Weight: 64 kg (141 lb)

Sport
- Sport: Swimming
- Strokes: Freestyle
Medal record
Women's swimming
Representing Brazil
Pan American Games
Silver medal – second place	2011 Guadalajara	4x200 m freestyle
South American Games
Gold medal – first place	2010 Medellín	4x200 m freestyle

Sarah Gonçalves Correa (August 14, 1992 – May 2, 2015) was a Brazilian competitive swimmer.

In 2008, at 16 years old, Correa took 2nd place in the José Finkel Trophy (Brazilian championship) in the 1500-metre freestyle. In 2009, she won the 1500 metre freestyle in the José Finkel Trophy.

At the 2010 South American Games, Correa won the gold medal in the 4×200-metre freestyle, beating the competition record.

Correa's was at the 2010 Pan Pacific Swimming Championships in Irvine, where she finished 6th in the 4×200-metre freestyle, 32nd in the 200-metre freestyle, 25th in the 400-metre freestyle, and 20th in the 800-metre freestyle.

Integrating national delegation that disputed the 2011 Pan American Games in Guadalajara, she won the silver medal in the 4×200-metre freestyle by participating at heats. She was also ranked 15th in the 800-metre freestyle.

Correa died after being hit by a motorist while waiting at a bus stop near her home in Barra da Tijuca, Rio de Janeiro on May 1, 2015. She was hospitalized, but died from serious head injuries on May 2.
