= María Álvarez (swimmer) =

Colombian swimmer (born 1989)

Personal information
- Full name: María Paula Álvarez Pugliese
- Nationality: Colombia
- Born: 10 October 1989 (age 36) Cali, Colombia

Sport
- Sport: Swimming
- Strokes: Freestyle
Medal record
Representing Colombia
Women's swimming
Event	1st	2nd	3rd
CAC Games	0	2	0
South American Games	0	3	3
South American Championships	0	2	5
Bolivarian Games	2	3	2
Total	2	10	10
Central American and Caribbean Games
Silver medal – second place	2010 Mayagüez	4×200 m freestyle
Silver medal – second place	2018 Barranquilla	4×200 m freestyle
South American Games
Silver medal – second place	2018 Cochabamba	4×100 m freestyle
Silver medal – second place	2018 Cochabamba	4×200 m freestyle
Silver medal – second place	2018 Cochabamba	4×100 m medley
Bronze medal – third place	2014 Santiago	4×200 m freestyle
Bronze medal – third place	2018 Cochabamba	200 m freestyle
Bronze medal – third place	2018 Cochabamba	400 m freestyle
South American Championships
Silver medal – second place	2016 Asunción	4×100 m freestyle
Silver medal – second place	2021 Buenos Aires	4×100 m freestyle
Bronze medal – third place	2016 Asunción	4×200 m freestyle
Bronze medal – third place	2018 Trujillo	200 m freestyle
Bronze medal – third place	2018 Trujillo	4×100 m freestyle
Bronze medal – third place	2018 Trujillo	4×100 m mixed freestyle
Bronze medal – third place	2021 Buenos Aires	4×200 m freestyle
Bolivarian Games
Gold medal – first place	2005 Armenia-Pereira	4×200 m freestyle
Gold medal – first place	2017 Santa Marta	4×100 m freestyle
Silver medal – second place	2005 Armenia-Pereira	4×100 m freestyle
Silver medal – second place	2013 Trujillo	4×200 m freestyle
Silver medal – second place	2017 Santa Marta	4×200 m freestyle
Bronze medal – third place	2005 Armenia-Pereira	200 m freestyle
Bronze medal – third place	2017 Santa Marta	200 m freestyle

María Paula Álvarez Pugliese (born 10 October 1989) is a Colombian swimmer. She competed in the women's 200 metre freestyle at the 2019 World Aquatics Championships.
