= Kristel Köbrich =

Chilean swimmer (born 1985)

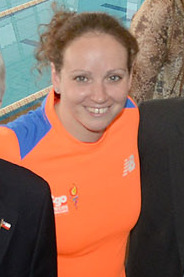
- Köbrich in 2022

Personal information
- Full name: Kristel Arianne Köbrich Schimpl
- Nationality: Chile
- Born: August 9, 1985 (age 41) Santiago, Chile
- Height: 1.71 m (5 ft 7 in)
- Weight: 61 kg (134 lb)

Sport
- Sport: Swimming
- Strokes: Freestyle
Medal record
Pan Pacific Championships
Bronze medal – third place	2010 Irvine	1500 m freestyle
Pan American Games
Gold medal – first place	2011 Guadalajara	800 m freestyle
Silver medal – second place	2015 Toronto	800 m freestyle
Silver medal – second place	2019 Lima	1500 m freestyle
Silver medal – second place	2023 Santiago	1500 m freestyle
Bronze medal – third place	2003 Santo Domingo	800 m freestyle
Bronze medal – third place	2011 Guadalajara	400 m freestyle
South American Games
Gold medal – first place	2006 Buenos Aires	800 m freestyle
Gold medal – first place	2006 Buenos Aires	1500 m freestyle
Gold medal – first place	2010 Medellín	1500 m freestyle
Gold medal – first place	2014 Santiago	1500 m freestyle
Gold medal – first place	2014 Santiago	10 km marathon
Gold medal – first place	2018 Cochabamba	400 m freestyle
Gold medal – first place	2018 Cochabamba	800 m freestyle
Gold medal – first place	2022 Asunción	1500 m freestyle
Silver medal – second place	2002 Belem	800 m freestyle
Silver medal – second place	2006 Buenos Aires	400 m freestyle
Silver medal – second place	2010 Medellín	400 m freestyle
Silver medal – second place	2010 Medellín	800 m freestyle
Silver medal – second place	2014 Santiago	400 m freestyle
Silver medal – second place	2014 Santiago	800 m freestyle
Silver medal – second place	2022 Asunción	400 m freestyle
Silver medal – second place	2022 Asunción	800 m freestyle
Silver medal – second place	2026 Santa Fe	1500 m freestyle
Bronze medal – third place	2002 Belem	400 m freestyle
Bronze medal – third place	2014 Santiago	3 km team
Bronze medal – third place	2026 Santa Fe	800 m freestyle
Bolivarian Games
Gold medal – first place	2013 Trujillo	1500 m freestyle
Gold medal – first place	2017 Santa Marta	800 m freestyle
Gold medal – first place	2025 Lima-Ayacucho	800 m freestyle
Gold medal – first place	2025 Lima-Ayacucho	1500 m freestyle
Silver medal – second place	2013 Trujillo	400 m freestyle
Silver medal – second place	2013 Trujillo	800 m freestyle
Silver medal – second place	2017 Santa Marta	400 m freestyle
Bronze medal – third place	2013 Trujillo	400 m medley
Bronze medal – third place	2017 Santa Marta	400 m medley
Bronze medal – third place	2025 Lima-Ayacucho	400 m freestyle

Kristel Arianne Köbrich Schimpl (born August 9, 1985, in Santiago, Chile) is an Olympic long-distance freestyle swimmer from Chile. She was the country's flag bearer at the 2004 Olympics, and has participated in six consecutive Olympic Games: 2004, 2008, 2012, 2016, 2020, and 2024.

Regarded as the best Chilean swimmer in history, Köbrich currently holds the South American records in the women's 800m and 1500m freestyle for both long and short courses. She also holds the Chilean records in the 200m, 400m, 800m, and 1500m freestyles (with times of 2:04.81, 4:11.83, 8:21.66, and 15:57.57), and also in the 400m IM (4:58.68).

== Personal life ==
Born in Santiago, Köbrich has been living in Córdoba, Argentina since 2004.

Her sisters are also swimmers, and her mother is a swimming coach.

Olympic Games
Preceded by Anita Irarrázabal	Flagbearer for Chile; Athens 2004	Succeeded by Daniela Anguita
