= 2014 South American Games =

Multi-sport event in Santiago, Chile

X South American Games
- Host city: Santiago
- Country: Chile
- Nations: 14 NOCs
- Athletes: 3,499
- Events: 317 in 33 sports (43 disciplines)
- Opening: March 7, 2014
- Closing: March 18, 2014
- Opened by: Sebastián Piñera
- Main venue: Estadio Nacional Julio Martínez Prádanos

The 2014 South American Games was a multi-sport event that took place in Santiago, Chile. It was the 10th edition of the ODESUR South American Games. Santiago hosted this event for the second time, the first being in 1986. Most of the events took place in and around the National Stadium. The games were held between March 7 to 18.

== Participating nations ==
14 countries competed at the games. One fewer that one 2010 South American Games, the Netherlands Antilles did not participate after the Dissolution of their country

- Argentina (510 athletes)
- Aruba (10)
- Bolivia (121)
- Brazil (491)
- Chile (575) (Host)
- Colombia (391)
- Ecuador (264)
- Guyana (8)
- Panama (41)
- Paraguay (191)
- Peru (261)
- Suriname (27)
- Uruguay (235)
- Venezuela (374)

== Bid ==
In 2006 Medellín won the bid for the 2010 edition 8 votes to 6, and the runner up Santiago will be organizing the next edition.

The Chilean government said they would invest US$800,000 for the games.

== Sports ==
- Aquatics
  - Diving (3)
  - Open water swimming (3)
  - Swimming (34)
  - Synchronized swimming (1)
- Archery (5)
- Athletics (44)
- Basketball (2)
- Boxing (12)
- Bowling (4)
- Canoeing (12)
- Cycling
  - BMX (2)
  - Mountain biking (2)
  - Road (4)
  - Track (10)
- Equestrian
  - Dressage (2)
  - Jumping (2)
- Fencing (10)
- Field hockey (2)
- Football (2)
- Futsal (1)
- Golf (2)
- Gymnastics
  - Artistic gymnastics (14)
  - Rhythmic gymnastics (6)
- Handball (2)
- Judo (14)
- Karate (10)
- Modern pentathlon (3)
- Roller skating
  - Figure skating (2)
  - Speed skating (6)
- Rowing (9)
- Rugby sevens (2)
- Sailing (6)
- Shooting (15)
- Table tennis (7)
- Taekwondo (7)
- Tennis (5)
- Triathlon (3)
- Volleyball
  - Volleyball (2)
  - Beach volleyball (2)
- Water skiing (10)
- Weightlifting (15)
- Wrestling
  - Freestyle (11)
  - Greco-Roman (6)

== Venues ==
- The Estadio Nacional Julio Martínez Prádanos is being renovated to seat 70,000 and get a new roof, inspired by Berlin's Olympiastadion.
- The Aquatic Center, Tennis Courts, Archery, Handball, Velodrome will be next to the Central Stadium.

== Mascot ==
The mascot for this edition of South American Games is Chago, which is based on an Andean condor. According to the organizers, the mascot symbolizes values of effort, dedication and teamwork.

== Medal table ==
* Host nation (Chile)

| Rank | Nation | Gold | Silver | Bronze | Total |
|---|---|---|---|---|---|
| 1 | Brazil | 110 | 69 | 79 | 258 |
| 2 | Colombia | 53 | 49 | 64 | 166 |
| 3 | Venezuela | 47 | 40 | 63 | 150 |
| 4 | Argentina | 46 | 57 | 56 | 159 |
| 5 | Chile* | 27 | 52 | 50 | 129 |
| 6 | Ecuador | 14 | 22 | 37 | 73 |
| 7 | Peru | 9 | 13 | 18 | 40 |
| 8 | Panama | 4 | 3 | 8 | 15 |
| 9 | Paraguay | 3 | 5 | 2 | 10 |
| 10 | Uruguay | 3 | 4 | 5 | 12 |
| 11 | Suriname | 1 | 0 | 4 | 5 |
| 12 | Bolivia | 0 | 0 | 4 | 4 |
| 13 | Aruba | 0 | 0 | 1 | 1 |
| 14 | Guyana | 0 | 0 | 0 | 0 |
| Totals (14 entries) | | 317 | 314 | 391 | 1,022 |
