= Swimming at the 2019 Pan American Games – Men's 4 × 100 metre freestyle relay =

Men's 4 × 100 metre freestyle relay at the 2019 Pan American Games
- Venue: Villa Deportiva Nacional, VIDENA
- Dates: August 6 (Final)
- Competitors: 32 from 8 nations
- Winning time: 3:12.61

Medalists
| Gold medal | Breno Correia; Marcelo Chierighini; Bruno Fratus; Pedro Spajari | Brazil |
| Silver medal | Michael Chadwick; Drew Kibler; Grant House; Nathan Adrian | United States |
| Bronze medal | Gabriel Castaño; Daniel Ramírez; Jorge Iga; Long Gutiérrez | Mexico |

The men's 4 × 100 metre freestyle relay competition of the swimming events at the 2019 Pan American Games are scheduled to be held August 6th, 2019 at the Villa Deportiva Nacional Videna cluster.

== Records ==
Prior to this competition, the existing world and Pan American Games records were as follows:

| World record | United States (USA); Michael Phelps (47.51); Garrett Weber-Gale (47.02); Cullen Jones (47.65); Jason Lezak (46.06) | 3:08.24 | Beijing, China | August 11, 2008 |
| Pan American Games record | Brazil (BRA); Matheus Santana (49.28); João de Lucca (48.06); Bruno Fratus (48.56); Marcelo Chierighini (47.76) | 3:13.66 | Toronto, Canada | July 14, 2015 |

== Results ==
| KEY: | q | Fastest non-qualifiers | Q | Qualified | GR | Games record | NR | National record | PB | Personal best | SB | Seasonal best |

=== Final ===
The final round was held on August 6.

| Rank | Lane | Names | Nationality | Time | Notes |
|---|---|---|---|---|---|
| 1st place, gold medalist(s) | 4 | Breno Correia (48.82); Marcelo Chierighini (47.45); Bruno Fratus (48.18); Pedro Spajari (48.16) | Brazil | 3:12.61 | GR |
| 2nd place, silver medalist(s) | 5 | Michael Chadwick (48.94); Drew Kibler (48.83); Grant House (49.47); Nathan Adrian (47.70) | United States | 3:14.94 | |
| 3rd place, bronze medalist(s) | 3 | Gabriel Castaño (50.72); Daniel Ramírez (49.17); Jorge Iga (48.69); Long Gutiérrez (49.12) | Mexico | 3:17.70 | NR |
| 4 | 6 | Alberto Abel Mestre (49.75); Cristian Quintero ( 48.15); Bryan Chávez (50.85); Jesus Daniel López (50.04) | Venezuela | 3:18.79 | |
| 5 | 8 | Ricardo Espinosa (52.22); Sebastián Arispe (51.73); Miguel Zavaleta (52.27); Joaquín Vargas (51.83) | Peru | 3:28.05 | |
| 6 | 7 | Jared Fitzgerald (51.52); Gershwin Greene (52.37); N'Nhyn Fernander (51.67); Davante Carey (52.66) | Bahamas | 3:28.22 | NR |
| 7 | 1 | Isaac Beitia (51.53); Hernán Gonzalez (51.69); Bernhard Christianson (52.55); Édgar Crespo (55.49) | Panama | 3:31.26 | |
| — | 2 | Federico Grabich (49.80); Guido Buscaglia (50.32); Santiago Grassi; Lautaro Rodríguez | Argentina | DSQ | |
