= Swimming at the 2019 Pan American Games – Men's 4 × 100 metre medley relay =

Men's 4 × 100 metre medley relay at the 2019 Pan American Games
- Venue: Villa Deportiva Nacional, VIDENA
- Dates: August 10 (preliminaries and finals)
- Competitors: 47 from 9 nations
- Winning time: 3:30.25

Medalists
Gold medal	Daniel Carr; Nic Fink; Tom Shields; Nathan Adrian; Nicholas Alexander; Matthew Josa; Michael Chadwick	United States
Silver medal	Guilherme Guido; João Gomes Júnior; Vinicius Lanza; Marcelo Chierighini; Leonardo de Deus; Felipe Lima; Luiz Altamir Melo; Breno Correia	Brazil
Bronze medal	Agustín Hernández; Gabriel Morelli; Santiago Grassi; Federico Grabich; Nicolás Deferrari; Guido Buscaglia	Argentina

The men's 4 × 100 metre medley relay competition of the swimming events at the 2019 Pan American Games are scheduled to be held August 10th, 2019 at the Villa Deportiva Nacional Videna cluster.

== Records ==
Prior to this competition, the existing world and Pan American Games records were as follows:

World record	United States (USA); Aaron Peirsol (52.19); Eric Shanteau (58.57); Michael Phelps (49.72); David Walters (46.80)	3:27.28	Rome, Italy	August 2, 2009
Pan American Games record	Brazil (BRA); Guilherme Guido (53.12); Felipe França Silva (59.81); Arthur Mendes (52.14); Marcelo Chierighini (47.61)	3:32.68	Toronto, Canada	July 18, 2015

== Results ==
KEY:	q	Fastest non-qualifiers	Q	Qualified	GR	Games record	NR	National record	PB	Personal best	SB	Seasonal best

=== Heats ===
The first round was held on August 10.

Rank	Heat	Lane	Name	Nationality	Time	Notes
1	2	4	Nicholas Alexander (54.42); Nic Fink (58.86); Matthew Josa (51.97); Michael Chadwick (48.66)	United States	3:33.91	Q
2	1	4	Leonardo de Deus (55.49); Felipe Lima (59.69); Luiz Altamir Melo (55.07); Breno Correia (49.86)	Brazil	3:40.11	Q
3	2	5	Andy Xianyang Song An (56.62); Mauro Castillo Luna (1:00.94); Mateo González Medina (54.79); Daniel Ramírez (49.09)	Mexico	3:41.44	Q
4	2	6	Charles Hockin (55.41) NR; Renato Prono (1:02.64); Ben Hockin (53.52); Matheo Mateos (52.71)	Paraguay	3:44.28	Q
5	2	3	Agustín Hernández (57.28); Gabriel Morelli (1:01.88); Nicolás Deferrari (54.91); Guido Buscaglia (50.43)	Argentina	3:44.50	Q
6	1	3	Anthony Rincón (56.40); Carlos Mahecha (1:02.28); David Arias (53.94); Esnaider Reales (52.17)	Colombia	3:44.79	Q
7	1	5	Jesus Daniel Lopez (58.31); Marco Guarente (1:02.82); Bryan Chavez Avendaño (55.53); Cristian Quintero (49.82)	Venezuela	3:46.48	Q
8	2	2	Hernán Gonzalez ( 1:00.23); Édgar Crespo ( 1:03.65); Bernhard Christianson (56.26); Isaac Beitía (51.27)	Panama	3:51.41	Q
9	1	2	Carlos Cobos (59.13); Giordano Gonzales (1:06.48); Javier Tang Juy (56.14); Sebastian Arispe (51.24)	Peru	3:52.99	
	1	6	Davante Carey; William Russell; N'Nhyn Fernander; Jared Fitzgerald	Bahamas	DNS	

=== Final ===
The final round was also on August 10.

Rank	Lane	Name	Nationality	Time	Notes
1st place, gold medalist(s)	4	Daniel Carr (53.95); Nic Fink (58.57); Tom Shields (50.40); Nathan Adrian (47.33)	United States	3:30.25	GR
2nd place, silver medalist(s)	5	Guilherme Guido (53.70); João Gomes Júnior (58.86); Vinicius Lanza (51.13); Marcelo Chierighini (47.29)	Brazil	3:30.98	
3rd place, bronze medalist(s)	2	Agustín Hernández (56.54); Gabriel Morelli (1:01.26); Santiago Grassi (51.61); Federico Grabich (49.00)	Argentina	3:38.41	NR
4	3	Andy Xianyang Song An (56.65); Miguel de Lara (1:00.89); Mateo González Medina (53.52); Jorge Iga (49.01)	Mexico	3:40.07	NR
5	7	Anthony Rincón (56.54); Carlos Mahecha (1:01.26); Esnaider Reales (54.03); David Arias (51.66)	Colombia	3:43.49	
6	6	Charles Hockin (55.42); Renato Prono (1:02.62); Ben Hockin (53.29); Matheo Mateos (52.42)	Paraguay	3:43.75	
7	1	Jesus Daniel Lopez (58.21); Marco Guarente (1:01.70); Bryan Chavez Avendaño (54.69); Cristian Quintero (49.36)	Venezuela	3:43.96	
8	8	Hernán Gonzalez (59.50); Édgar Crespo (1:03.48); Bernhard Christianson (56.08); Isaac Beitía (51.46)	Panama	3:50.52	
