= Swimming at the 2019 Pan American Games – Men's 100 metre butterfly =

Men's 100 metre butterfly at the 2019 Pan American Games
- Venue: Villa Deportiva Nacional, VIDENA
- Dates: August 7 (preliminaries and finals)
- Competitors: 23 from 18 nations

Medalists
Gold medal	Tom Shields	United States
Silver medal	Luis Martínez	Guatemala
Bronze medal	Vinicius Lanza	Brazil

The men's 100 metre butterfly competition of the swimming events at the 2019 Pan American Games was held on August 7, 2019 at the Villa Deportiva Nacional Videna cluster.

== Records ==
Prior to this competition, the existing world and Pan American Games records were as follows:

World record	Caeleb Dressel (USA)	49.50	Gwangju, South Korea	July 26, 2019
Pan American Games record	Giles Smith (USA)	52.04	Toronto, Canada	July 16, 2015

== Results ==
KEY:	q	Fastest non-qualifiers	Q	Qualified	GR	Games record	NR	National record	PB	Personal best	SB	Seasonal best

=== Heats ===
The first round was held on August 7.

Rank	Heat	Lane	Name	Nationality	Time	Notes
1	2	4	Luis Martínez	Guatemala	51.44	QA, GR, NR
2	2	5	Santiago Grassi	Argentina	51.92	QA
3	3	5	Matthew Josa	United States	52.28	QA
4	3	4	Vinicius Lanza	Brazil	53.11	QA
5	1	4	Tom Shields	United States	53.29	QA
6	3	6	Ben Hockin	Paraguay	53.43	QA
7	1	5	Long Gutiérrez	Mexico	54.05	QA
8	2	6	David Arias	Colombia	54.16	QA
9	1	3	Roberto Strelkov	Argentina	54.18	QB
10	3	3	Esnaider Reales	Colombia	54.19	QB
11	2	3	Mateo González Medina	Mexico	54.37	QB
12	1	6	Bryan Chavez Avendaño	Venezuela	54.85	QB
13	2	1	Javier Tang Juy	Peru	55.47	QB
14	3	2	Kael Yorke	Trinidad and Tobago	55.53	QB
15	2	2	N'Nhyn Fernander	Bahamas	55.65	QB
16	2	7	Bryan Alvaréz	Costa Rica	55.80	QB
17	1	7	Carlos Vasquez Moreno	Honduras	56.01	
18	1	2	Gabriel Araya	Chile	56.13	
19	3	1	Lázaro Martín Vergara	Cuba	56.17	
20	1	1	Gustavo Gutierrez Lozano	Peru	56.20	
21	3	7	Adriel Sanes	Virgin Islands	56.46	
22	2	8	Lleyton Martin	Antigua and Barbuda	58.28	
23	3	8	Jesse Washington	Bermuda	58.54	

=== Final B ===
The B final was also held on August 7.

Rank	Lane	Name	Nationality	Time	Notes
9	4	Roberto Strelkov	Argentina	54.04	
10	3	Mateo González Medina	Mexico	54.09	
11	5	Esnaider Reales	Colombia	54.30	
12	6	Bryan Chavez Avendaño	Venezuela	54.82	
13	8	Bryan Alvaréz	Costa Rica	55.50	
14	1	N'Nhyn Fernander	Bahamas	55.71	
15	7	Kael Yorke	Trinidad and Tobago	55.90	
16	2	Javier Tang Juy	Peru	56.06	

=== Final A ===
The A final was also held on August 7.

Rank	Lane	Name	Nationality	Time	Notes
1st place, gold medalist(s)	2	Tom Shields	United States	51.59	
2nd place, silver medalist(s)	4	Luis Martínez	Guatemala	51.63	
3rd place, bronze medalist(s)	6	Vinicius Lanza	Brazil	51.88	
4	5	Santiago Grassi	Argentina	52.15	
5	3	Matthew Josa	United States	52.22	
6	1	Long Gutiérrez	Mexico	53.67	
7	7	Ben Hockin	Paraguay	53.70	
8	8	David Arias	Colombia	54.06	
