= Swimming at the 2019 Pan American Games – Men's 100 metre freestyle =

Men's 100 metre freestyle at the 2019 Pan American Games
- Venues: Villa Deportiva Nacional, VIDENA
- Dates: August 8 (preliminaries and finals)
- Competitors: 29 from 23 nations

Medalists
Gold medal	Marcelo Chierighini	Brazil
Silver medal	Nathan Adrian	United States
Bronze medal	Michael Chadwick	United States

The men's 100 metre freestyle competition of the swimming events at the 2019 Pan American Games were held on August 8, 2019 at the Villa Deportiva Nacional Videna cluster.

== Records ==
Prior to this competition, the existing world and Pan American Games records were as follows:

World record	César Cielo Filho (BRA)	46.91	Rome, Italy	July 30, 2009
Pan American Games record	César Cielo Filho (BRA)	47.84	Guadalajara, Mexico	October 16, 2011

== Results ==
KEY:	q	Fastest non-qualifiers	Q	Qualified	GR	Games record	NR	National record	PB	Personal best	SB	Seasonal best

=== Heats ===
The first round was held on August 8.

Rank	Heat	Lane	Name	Nationality	Time	Notes
1	2	4	Michael Chadwick	United States	48.94	QA
2	3	4	Marcelo Chierighini	Brazil	49.02	QA
3	3	5	Mikel Schreuders	Aruba	49.08	QA, NR
4	3	6	Cristian Quintero	Venezuela	49.15	QA
5	2	3	Breno Correia	Brazil	49.24	QA
6	4	4	Nathan Adrian	United States	49.54	QA
7	3	1	Brett Fraser	Cayman Islands	49.68	QA
8	3	3	Long Gutiérrez	Mexico	49.73	QSO
8	2	5	Renzo Tjon-A-Joe	Suriname	49.73	QSO
8	2	6	Guido Buscaglia	Argentina	49.73	QSO
11	4	6	Alberto Mestre Vivas	Venezuela	49.74	QB
12	4	5	Jorge Iga	Mexico	49.87	QB
13	4	3	Federico Grabich	Argentina	49.88	WD
14	4	2	Ben Hockin	Paraguay	50.28	QB
15	4	8	Jared Fitzgerald	Bahamas	51.16	QB
16	4	7	Isaac Beitía	Panama	51.18	QB
17	3	7	Gabriel Araya	Chile	51.45	QB
18	2	7	Jean-Luc Zephir	Saint Lucia	51.77	QB
19	2	1	Miguel Mena	Nicaragua	52.07	
20	2	8	Sebastian Arispe Silva	Peru	52.10	
21	3	2	Esnaider Reales	Colombia	52.19	
22	1	4	Marco Flores	Honduras	52.21	
23	4	1	Jesse Washington	Bermuda	52.22	
24	3	8	Ricardo Espinosa	Peru	52.29	
25	2	2	Alex Sobers	Barbados	52.45	
26	1	5	Delron Felix	Grenada	53.46	
27	1	3	Lleyton Martin	Antigua and Barbuda	55.45	
28	1	2	Daniel Scott	Guyana	56.94	
29	1	6	Cruz Halbich	Saint Vincent and the Grenadines	57.61	

=== Swim-off ===
The swim-off was also held on August 8.

Rank	Lane	Name	Nationality	Time	Notes
8	3	Long Gutiérrez	Mexico	49.69	QA
9	4	Renzo Tjon-A-Joe	Suriname	50.15	WD
10	5	Guido Buscaglia	Argentina	50.19	QB

=== Final B ===
The B final was also held on August 8.

Rank	Lane	Name	Nationality	Time	Notes
9	6	Ben Hockin	Paraguay	49.89	
10	3	Jorge Iga	Mexico	50.00	
11	5	Alberto Mestre Vivas	Venezuela	50.08	
12	4	Guido Buscaglia	Argentina	50.15	
13	2	Jared Fitzgerald	Bahamas	50.81	NR
14	1	Gabriel Araya	Chile	51.25	NR
15	8	Jean-Luc Zephir	Saint Lucia	51.94	
16	7	Isaac Beitía	Panama	52.03	

=== Final A ===
The A final was also held on August 8.

Rank	Lane	Name	Nationality	Time	Notes
1st place, gold medalist(s)	5	Marcelo Chierighini	Brazil	48.09	
2nd place, silver medalist(s)	7	Nathan Adrian	United States	48.17	
3rd place, bronze medalist(s)	4	Michael Chadwick	United States	48.88	
4	6	Cristian Quintero	Venezuela	48.94	NR
5	2	Breno Correia	Brazil	49.14	
6	3	Mikel Schreuders	Aruba	49.21	
7	8	Long Gutiérrez	Mexico	49.84	
8	1	Brett Fraser	Cayman Islands	49.97	
