= Judo at the 2019 Pan American Games – Qualification =

The following is the qualification system and qualified athletes for the judo at the 2019 Pan American Games competitions.

== Qualification system ==
A total of 140 judokas qualified to compete at the games. The top nine athletes (one per NOC) in each weight category's ranking after four qualification tournaments qualified along with one spot per category for the host nation, Peru. Each nation can enter a maximum of 14 athletes (seven men and seven women).

== Qualification timeline ==
Events	Date	Venue
2018 Pan American Judo Championships	April 21–22, 2018	(Costa Rica) San Jose
2018 Pan American Cup	June 23–24, 2018	(Peru) Lima
2019 Pan American Judo Championships	April 26–27, 2019	(Peru) Lima
2019 Pan American Cup	May 25–26, 2019	Panama City

== Qualification summary ==
The following is a list of qualified countries and athletes per event. A total of 25 countries qualified judoka.

NOC	Men							Women							Total
NOC	-60 kg	-66 kg	-73 kg	-81 kg	-90 kg	-100 kg	+100 kg	-48kg	-52 kg	-57 kg	-63 kg	-70 kg	-78 kg	+78 kg	Total
Argentina		X		X	X		X	X	X		X		X		8
Aruba										X					1
Bahamas										X				X	2
Brazil	X	X	X	X	X	X	X	X	X	X	X	X	X	X	14
Canada		X	X		X		X		X			X	X		7
Chile	X					X	X	X	X						5
Colombia	X	X	X		X	X		X		X	X	X		X	10
Costa Rica													X		1
Cuba	X	X	X	X	X	X	X	X	X	X	X	X	X	X	14
Dominican Republic	X	X		X	X	X	X	X	X	X					9
Ecuador	X					X	X				X		X		5
El Salvador				X											1
Guatemala	X							X							2
Haiti			X												1
Honduras											X				1
Jamaica												X			1
Mexico		X	X	X	X	X		X	X	X	X	X	X	X	12
Nicaragua														X	1
Panama	X				X				X	X					4
Peru	X	X	X	X	X	X	X	X	X	X	X	X	X	X	14
Puerto Rico			X	X								X		X	4
Trinidad and Tobago														X	1
United States	X	X	X	X		X	X	X	X	X	X	X	X	X	13
Uruguay						X									1
Venezuela		X	X	X	X		X				X	X	X		8
Total: 25 NOCs	10	10	10	10	10	10	10	10	10	10	10	10	10	10	140

== Men ==
=== 60 kg ===
Criteria	Vacancies	Qualified
Host nation	1	Peru
Top 9 ranked countries	9	Ecuador; Cuba; Brazil; Dominican Republic; United States; Panama; Colombia; Chile; Guatemala
TOTAL	10	

=== 66 kg ===
Criteria	Vacancies	Qualified
Host nation	1	Peru
Top 9 ranked countries	9	Cuba; Brazil; Venezuela; Dominican Republic; Canada; Mexico; Argentina; United States; Colombia
TOTAL	10	

=== 73 kg ===
Criteria	Vacancies	Qualified
Host nation	1	Peru
Top 9 ranked countries	9	Cuba; Mexico; Venezuela; Brazil; United States; Canada; ~~Dominican Republic~~; Puerto Rico; Haiti; Colombia
TOTAL	10	

=== 81 kg ===
Criteria	Vacancies	Qualified
Host nation	1	Peru
Top 9 ranked countries	9	~~Canada~~; Dominican Republic; Brazil; Venezuela; Puerto Rico; Cuba; United States; El Salvador; Mexico; Argentina
TOTAL	10	

=== 90 kg ===
Criteria	Vacancies	Qualified
Host nation	1	Peru
Top 9 ranked countries	9	Cuba; Dominican Republic; Colombia; Brazil; Canada; ~~United States~~; Argentina; Venezuela; Mexico; Panama
TOTAL	10	

=== 100 kg ===
Criteria	Vacancies	Qualified
Host nation	1	Peru
Top 9 ranked countries	9	Brazil; Dominican Republic; Cuba; ~~Canada~~; Chile; United States; Mexico; Colombia; Uruguay; Ecuador
TOTAL	10	

=== +100 kg ===
Criteria	Vacancies	Qualified
Host nation	1	Peru
Top 9 ranked countries	9	Ecuador; Cuba; Chile; Argentina; Venezuela; Brazil; Dominican Republic; United States; Canada
TOTAL	10	

== Women ==
=== 48 kg ===
Criteria	Vacancies	Qualified
Host nation	1	Peru
Top 9 ranked countries	9	Argentina; Mexico; Colombia; Brazil; Cuba; United States; Dominican Republic; Chile; Guatemala
TOTAL	10	

=== 52 kg ===
Criteria	Vacancies	Qualified
Host nation	1	Peru
Top 9 ranked countries	9	Mexico; United States; Brazil; Cuba; Panama; Canada; Dominican Republic; Argentina; Chile
TOTAL	10	

=== 57 kg ===
Criteria	Vacancies	Qualified
Host nation	1	Peru
Top 9 ranked countries	9	~~Canada~~; Dominican Republic; Cuba; Brazil; Colombia; Panama; United States; ~~Venezuela~~; ~~Argentina~~; Mexico; Bahamas; Aruba
TOTAL	10	

=== 63 kg ===
Criteria	Vacancies	Qualified
Host nation	1	Peru
Top 9 ranked countries	9	Cuba; ~~Canada~~; Venezuela; Brazil; Ecuador; Mexico; United States; Argentina; Colombia; Honduras
TOTAL	10	

=== 70 kg ===
Criteria	Vacancies	Qualified
Host nation	1	Peru
Top 9 ranked countries	9	Puerto Rico; Colombia; Cuba; Venezuela; Brazil; Canada; ~~Honduras~~; ~~Argentina~~; Jamaica; Mexico; United States
TOTAL	10	

=== 78 kg ===
Criteria	Vacancies	Qualified
Host nation	1	Peru
Top 9 ranked countries	9	Cuba; Brazil; Venezuela; Ecuador; Argentina; Mexico; United States; Costa Rica; Canada
TOTAL	10	

=== +78 kg ===
Criteria	Vacancies	Qualified
Host nation	1	Peru
Top 9 ranked countries	9	Cuba; Puerto Rico; Brazil; United States; Nicaragua; Mexico; Colombia; ~~Argentina~~; Trinidad and Tobago; Bahamas
TOTAL	10	
