= Bahamas at the 2019 Pan American Games =

- IOC code: BAH
- NOC: Bahamas Olympic Committee

in Lima, Peru 26 July–11 August 2019
- Competitors: 33 in 4 sports
- Flag bearer: Justin Roberts (opening)
- Medals Ranked =30th: Gold 0 Silver 0 Bronze 1 Total 1

Pan American Games appearances (overview)
- 1955; 1959; 1963; 1967; 1971; 1975; 1979; 1983; 1987; 1991; 1995; 1999; 2003; 2007; 2011; 2015; 2019; 2023

The Bahamas competed at the 2019 Pan American Games in Lima, Peru from July 26 to August 11, 2019.

On July 3, 2019, the Bahamas Olympic Committee announced a team of 33 athletes (20 men and 13 women) competing in four sports: athletics, judo, swimming and tennis.

During the opening ceremony of the games, tennis player Justin Roberts carried the flag of the country as part of the parade of nations.

The Bahamas won one medal at the games, the lowest for the country since winning zero in 1975 in Mexico City.

== Competitors ==
The following is the list of number of competitors (per gender) participating at the games per sport/discipline.

Sport	Men	Women	Total
Athletics (track and field)	12	7	19
Judo	0	2	2
Swimming	6	4	10
Tennis	2	0	2
Total	20	13	33

== Medalists ==
The following competitors from The Bahamas won medals at the games. In the by discipline sections below, medalists' names are bolded.

Medal	Name	Sport	Event	Date
Bronze	Tynia Gaither	Athletics	Women's 200 m	August 9

== Athletics (track and field) ==
The Bahamas qualified 19 track and field athletes (12 men and seven women). The team won one bronze medal, the only one for the country at the games.

Key

- Note–Ranks given for track events are for the entire round
- **Q** = Qualified for the next round
- **q** = Qualified for the next round as a fastest loser or, in field events, by position without achieving the qualifying target
- **PB** = Personal best
- **SB** = Seasonal best
- DNF = Did not finish
- NM = No mark

Men
Track events

Athlete	Event	Semifinals		Final	
Athlete	Event	Result	Rank	Result	Rank
Warren Fraser	100 m	10.62	20	did not advance	
Cliff Resias	200 m	21.74	14	did not advance	
Andre Colebrook	400 m hurdles	51.76	12	did not advance	
Jeffery Gibson	400 m hurdles	50.09	7 **Q**	49.53 **SB**	4
O'Jay Ferguson; Alonzo Russell; Andre Colebrook; Jeffery Gibson	4 × 400 m relay	—N/a		3:09.98	7

- Michael Mathieu was named to the team and did not compete in any event

Field events

Athlete	Event	Final	
Athlete	Event	Distance	Position
Donald Thomas	High jump	2.10	=11
Jamal Wilson	High jump	NM	
Lanthone Collie	Triple jump	15.78	11
Latario Collie-Minns	Triple jump	NM	

Combined events – Decathlon

Athlete	Event	100 m	LJ	SP	HJ	400 m	110H	DT	PV	JT	1500 m	Final	Rank
Ken Mullings	Result	11.09	7.07	12.86	2.03	50.88	14.42	41.25	4.40	57.18	5:02.79	7517 **PB**	6
Ken Mullings	Points	841	830	659	831	774	921	690	731	696	544	7517 **PB**	6

Women
Track events

Athlete	Event	Semifinals		Final	
Athlete	Event	Result	Rank	Result	Rank
Brianne Bethel	100 m	11.76	13	did not advance	
**Tynia Gaither**	200 m	21.74	14	22.76	3rd place, bronze medalist(s)
Anthonique Strachan	200 m	23.41	8 **q**	22.97	5
Devynne Charlton	100 m hurdles	13.49	10	did not advance	
Pedrya Seymour	100 m hurdles	12.94	4 **Q**	13.12	5
Katrina Seymour	400 m hurdles	1:00.71	14	did not advance	
Devynne Charlton; Brianne Bethel; Pedrya Seymour; Tynia Gaither	4 × 100 m relay	—N/a		DNF	

Field event

Athlete	Event	Final	
Athlete	Event	Distance	Position
Tamara Myers	Triple jump	13.96 **SB**	5

== Judo ==
Bahamas qualified two female judoka. This mark the country's debut in the sport at the Pan American Games.

Women

Athlete	Event	Preliminaries	Quarterfinals	Semifinals	Repechage	Final / BM	
Athlete	Event	Opposition Result	Opposition Result	Opposition Result	Opposition Result	Opposition Result	Rank
Cynthia Rahming	57 kg	Arango (PER); **L** 00S3–100	did not advance				
Sasha Ingraham	+78 kg	Wood (TTO); **L** 000–110	did not advance				

== Swimming ==
The Bahamas qualified ten swimmers (six men and four women). The team was named after the completion of the National Championships at the end of June.

Key

- Note – Ranks given are for the entire round
- **NR** – National record
- **QA** – Qualified for Final A
- **QB** – Qualified for Final B

Men

Athlete	Event	Heat		Final	
Athlete	Event	Time	Rank	Time	Rank
Gershwin Greene	50 m freestyle	23.33	18	did not advance	
Jared Fitzgerald	100 m freestyle	51.16	15 **QB**	50.81 **NR**	13
Luke-Kennedy Thompson	1500 m freestyle	—N/a		16:59.39	18
Davantae Carey	100 m backstroke	59.45	20	did not advance	
William Tyler Russell	100 m breaststroke	1:07.67	26	did not advance	
William Tyler Russell	200 m breaststroke	2:29.37	22	did not advance	
N'Nhyn Fernander	100 m butterfly	55.65	15 **QB**	55.71	14
Jared Fitzgerald; Gershwin Greene; N'Nhyn Fernander; Davante Carey	4 × 100 m freestyle relay	—N/a		3:28.22 **NR**	6
Davante Carey; William Tyler Russell; N'Nhyn Fernander; Jared Fitzgerald	4 × 100 m medley relay	DNS			

Women

Athlete	Event	Heat		Final	
Athlete	Event	Time	Rank	Time	Rank
Ariel Weech	50 m freestyle	26.84	17 **QB**	26.48	13
Lillian Higgs	100 m freestyle	59.32	20	did not advance	
Laura Morley	100 m breaststroke	1:11.28	12 **QB**	1:11.00	11
Laura Morley	200 m breaststroke	2:30.21 **NR**	7 **QA**	2:32.87	8
Laura Morley	200 m individual medley	2:19.37	9 **QB**	2:18.54	9
Margaret Higgs	200 m breaststroke	2:33.67	11 **QB**	2:34.17	12
Lillian Higgs; Margaret Higgs; Laura Morley; Ariel Weech	4 × 100 m freestyle relay	—N/a		3:56.68	6
Lillian Higgs; Margaret Higgs; Laura Morley; Ariel Weech	4 × 100 m medley relay	4:26.60	8 **QA**	4:27.52	8

Mixed

Athlete	Event	Heat		Final	
Athlete	Event	Time	Rank	Time	Rank
Jared Fitzgerald; Gershwin Greene; Ariel Weech; Lillian Higgs; Margaret Higgs*	4 × 100 m freestyle relay	3:41.86	7 **QA**	3:42.59	7

- Swam in the heat only

== Tennis ==
The Bahamas qualified two male tennis players.

Men

Athlete	Event	First round	Round of 32	Round of 16	Quarterfinals	Semifinals	Final / BM	
Athlete	Event	Opposition Score	Opposition Score	Opposition Score	Opposition Score	Opposition Score	Opposition Score	Rank
Baker Newman	Singles	Miralles (ESA); **W** 6–2, 6–2	Andreozzi (ARG); **L** 0–6, 1–6	did not advance				
Justin Roberts	Singles	Galdós (PER); **W** 6–7, 7–6, 6–4	Hernández (DOM); **L** 4–6, 2–6	did not advance				
Baker Newman; Justin Roberts	Doubles	—N/a	Bye	Andreozzi / Bagnis (ARG); **L** 2–6, 2–6	did not advance			

== See also ==
- Bahamas at the 2020 Summer Olympics
