= Fencing at the 2019 Pan American Games – Qualification =

The following is the qualification system and qualified countries for the Fencing at the 2019 Pan American Games competitions.

== Qualification system ==
A total of 156 fencers will qualify to compete. Each nation may enter a maximum of 18 athletes (nine per gender). The top seven teams at the 2018 Pan American Championships, along with the top two individuals not qualified through the team event will qualify for each respective discipline per gender. The host nation, Peru, automatically qualifies the maximum number of fencers (18). A maximum of two athletes from one NOC can enter the individual events.

== Qualification timeline ==
Event	Date	Venue
2018 Pan American Fencing Championships	June 15–20, 2018	(Cuba) Havana

== Qualification summary ==
A total of 15 countries qualified fencers.

NOC	Men						Women						Total
NOC	Ind. épée	Team épée	Ind. foil	Team foil	Ind. sabre	Team sabre	Ind. épée	Team épée	Ind. foil	Team foil	Ind. sabre	Team sabre	Total
Argentina	2	X	2	X	2	X	2	X	2	X	2	X	18
Brazil	2	X	2	X	2	X	2	X	2	X			15
Canada	2	X	2	X	2	X	2	X	2	X	2	X	18
Chile	1		1		1								3
Colombia	1		2	X	2	X			2	X	2	X	13
Costa Rica							1						1
Cuba	2	X	1		2	X	2	X	2	X	1		14
Dominican Republic							1				2	X	4
El Salvador									1				1
Mexico	2	X	2	X	1		2	X	2	X	2	X	16
Panama											1		1
Peru	2	X	2	X	2	X	2	X	2	X	2	X	18
Puerto Rico			2	X									3
United States	2	X	2	X	2	X	2	X	2	X	2	X	18
Venezuela	2	X			2	X	2	X	1		2	X	13
Total: 15 NOCs	18	8	18	8	18	8	18	8	18	8	18	8	156

== Men ==
=== Épée ===
Competition	Fencers per NOC	Total	Qualified
Host nation	3	3	Peru
2018 Pan American Championship team event	3	21	United States; Venezuela; Argentina; Brazil; Cuba; Mexico; Canada
2018 Pan American Championship individual event	1	2	Colombia; Chile
Total		26	

=== Foil ===
Competition	Fencers per NOC	Total	Qualified
Host nation	3	3	Peru
2018 Pan American Championship team event	3	21	United States; Brazil; Canada; Puerto Rico; Argentina; Mexico; Colombia
2018 Pan American Championship individual event	1	2	Chile; Cuba
Total		26	

=== Sabre ===
Competition	Fencers per NOC	Total	Qualified
Host nation	3	3	Peru
2018 Pan American Championship team event	3	21	United States; Canada; Argentina; Venezuela; Colombia; Cuba; Brazil
2018 Pan American Championship individual event	1	2	Mexico; Chile
Total		26	

== Women ==
=== Épée ===
Competition	Fencers per NOC	Total	Qualified
Host nation	3	3	Peru
2018 Pan American Championship team event	3	21	United States; Canada; Cuba; Brazil; Argentina; Venezuela; Mexico
2018 Pan American Championship individual event	1	2	Dominican Republic; Costa Rica
Total		26	

=== Foil ===
Competition	Fencers per NOC	Total	Qualified
Host nation	3	3	Peru
2018 Pan American Championship team event	3	21	United States; Canada; Brazil; Argentina; Mexico; Cuba; Colombia
2018 Pan American Championship individual event	1	2	Venezuela; ~~Puerto Rico~~; El Salvador
Total		26	

=== Sabre ===
Competition	Fencers per NOC	Total	Qualified
Host nation	3	3	Peru
2018 Pan American Championship team event	3	21	United States; Mexico; Venezuela; Canada; Argentina; Colombia; Dominican Republic
2018 Pan American Championship individual event	1	2	Cuba; Panama
Total		26	
