= Gabriel Castaño =

Mexican swimmer (born 1997)

Personal information
- Full name: Gabriel Castaño García
- Born: 1 November 1997 (age 29) Monterrey, Mexico

Sport
- Sport: Swimming
- College team: Penn State
Medal record
Men's swimming
Representing Mexico
Pan American Games
Bronze medal – third place	2019 Lima	4×100 m freestyle

Gabriel Castaño García (Note: In this Spanish name, the first or paternal surname is Castaño and the second or maternal family name is García.) (born 1 November 1997) is a Mexican swimmer. He made his Olympic debut at Tokyo 2020, competing in men's 50m freestyle. He also competed in Paris 2024.

He graduated from Pennsylvania State University and currently lives in Dallas, Texas, where he trains at Texas Ford Aquatics located in Frisco.

== Sports career ==
Before swimming, he competed in track cycling and mountain bike at national level in Mexico.

He was a bronze medalist at 2019 Pan American Games, where he competeded on men's 4 × 100 m freestyle relay.

In 2020, he underwent a knee surgery prior to his Olympic debut at Tokyo 2020.

In 2022, he participated in the Selectivo Unico Cancun competition, where he won the gold medal. Afterwards, he participated for the first time in 2022 World Aquatics Championships, where he ranked 37th.

In 2023 Pan American Games, he competed on men's 4 × 100 m freestyle relay (ranked 4th), mixed 4 × 100 m freestyle relay (ranked 7th) and men's 50m freestyle (ranked 5th).

In 2024, he became the first Mexican swimmer to break 22 seconds for men's 50 metre freestyle. At the TYR Pro Championships held in San Antonio, Texas, he clocked 21.81 (time trial) and then 21.67 (heats). This allowed him to qualify for Paris 2024, where he reached the men's 50 metre freestyle semifinal and ranked 15th.

== See also ==
- List of Pennsylvania State University Olympians
