= Swimming at the 2019 Pan American Games – Men's 1500 metre freestyle =

Men's 1500 metre freestyle at the 2019 Pan American Games
- Venues: Villa Deportiva Nacional, VIDENA
- Dates: August 10 (Final)
- Competitors: 18 from 13 nations
- Winning time: 15:09.93

Medalists
| Gold medal | Guilherme Costa | Brazil |
| Silver medal | Nicholas Sweetser | United States |
| Bronze medal | Ricardo Vargas | Mexico |

The men's 1500 metre freestyle competition of the swimming events at the 2019 Pan American Games are scheduled to be held August 10th, 2019 at the Villa Deportiva Nacional Videna cluster.

== Records ==
Prior to this competition, the existing world and Pan American Games records were as follows:

| World record | Sun Yang (CHN) | 14:31.02 | London, Great Britain | August 4, 2012 |
| Pan American Games record | Ryan Cochrane (CAN) | 15:06.40 | Toronto, Canada | July 18, 2015 |

== Results ==
| KEY: | q | Fastest non-qualifiers | Q | Qualified | GR | Games record | NR | National record | PB | Personal best | SB | Seasonal best |

=== Final ===
The final round was held on August 10.

| Rank | Heat | Lane | Name | Nationality | Time | Notes |
|---|---|---|---|---|---|---|
| 1st place, gold medalist(s) | 3 | 4 | Guilherme Costa | Brazil | 15:09.93 | |
| 2nd place, silver medalist(s) | 3 | 5 | Nicholas Sweetser | United States | 15:14.24 | |
| 3rd place, bronze medalist(s) | 3 | 2 | Ricardo Vargas | Mexico | 15:14.99 | |
| 4 | 3 | 7 | Marcelo Acosta | El Salvador | 15:21.03 | |
| 5 | 3 | 3 | Andrew Abruzzo | United States | 15:22.93 | |
| 6 | 3 | 6 | Diogo Villarinho | Brazil | 15:26.94 | |
| 7 | 3 | 1 | Rafael Zambrano | Venezuela | 15:32.66 | |
| 8 | 3 | 8 | Martín Carrizo | Argentina | 15:36.63 | |
| 9 | 2 | 5 | Franco Cassini | Argentina | 15:44.15 | |
| 10 | 2 | 3 | Christian Bayo | Puerto Rico | 15:50.66 | |
| 11 | 2 | 4 | Andy Arteta Gomez | Venezuela | 16:01.13 | |
| 12 | 2 | 6 | David Farinango Berru | Ecuador | 16:01.18 | |
| 13 | 2 | 2 | Rodolfo Falcón Mojarrieta | Cuba | 16:01.74 | |
| 14 | 2 | 7 | Gustavo Gutiérrez | Peru | 16:07.48 | |
| 15 | 1 | 4 | Graham Chatoor | Trinidad and Tobago | 16:13.84 | |
| 16 | 1 | 5 | John Michael Bodden | Cayman Islands | 16:16.31 | |
| 17 | 2 | 1 | Piero Nascimiento | Peru | 16:16.42 | |
| 18 | 1 | 3 | Luke-Kennedy Thompson | Bahamas | 16:59.39 | |
