= True Sweetser =

American swimmer (born 1997)

Personal information
- Full name: Nicholas True Sweetser
- Nationality: USA
- Born: October 14, 1997 (age 29) Gainesville, Florida
- Education: Stanford University (June, 2022 BA, Sept. 2022 MA)
- Occupation: Swim Coach (2025)
- Height: 6 ft 3 in (191 cm)

Sport
- Sport: Swimming
- Events: 1500 freestyle 1650 freestyle
- Strokes: Freestyle
- Club: Central Florida Marlins; Gator Swim Club
- College team: Stanford University
- Coach: Ted Knapp, Dan Schemmel (Stanford)
Medal record
Men's swimming
Representing the United States
Pan American Games
| Silver medal – second place | 2019 Lima | 1500 m freestyle |

Nicholas "True" Sweetser (born October 14, 1997) is an American swimmer. He competed in the men's 1500 metre freestyle event at the 2017 World Aquatics Championships.

== Early life ==
Sweetser was born the youngest of six siblings on October 14, 1997, to father Matthew, and mother Christine Sweetser, likley in greater Gainesville, Florida. From a family of accomplished swimmers, Nicholas's brother Luke competed for Harvard, and siblings Marissa, Christian and Seth, all competed in swimming for Cornell University. Marissa held Cornell team records in the 200 and 100 breaststroke events. Nicholas attended F. W. Buchholz High School in Gainesville, Florida, graduating in 2016. In club competition, he swam for the Central Florida Marlins and later from 2013-2016 swam with the Gator Swim Club beginning at the age of 15. Swimming for the Gator Swim Club on April 13, 2014, Sweetser demonstrated an early ability in freestyle distance swimming, winning the Florida 5K Open Water Championship at Miromar Lakes for age group 15-16 in a time of :59:04.1. By 16, he began swimming for the U.S. Junior National Team, and by 17 was part of the U.S. Senior National Team.

== Stanford University ==
Sweetser attended and competed for Stanford University from 2016-2021, where he was managed and trained by Coach Ted Knapp through 2019, and then Dan Schemmel. He graduated with a degree in History in 2021. He later earned a Master's Degree in September 2022 from Stanford in Eastern European, Russian, and Eurasian Studies. At Stanford, he was part of the swim team that won the 2017 Pac-12 Championship and earned All American honors a total of four times, which included the 500 free event in 2017, where he placed 16th, the mile or 1650 freestyle in 2017 where he placed seventh in 2019, eighth in 2018, and twelfth in 2017. In conference honors, he earned a PAC-12 championship title in the 1650 freestyle in 2017. Contributing early, he established a new Stanford record in the 1000 freestyle as a Freshman with a time of 8:49.69.

An able scholar, he was a recipient of an NCAA Post-graduate scholarship, and was an All American scholar as voted by the College Swimming Coaches Association of America consecutively for three years from 2017-19. In 2021, he was voted the Academic Honor Roll by the Pac-12 conference. He was a Pac-12 All Academic honoree in both 2018 and 2018.

=== Competition highlights ===
Sweetser competed in the World Aquatics Championships in 2017, placing sixteenth in the Men's 1500 meter freestyle event. He had also competed in the short course event in 2016, with a sixth place finish in the 1500 meter freestyle. He won a silver medal in the 1500 meter freestyle at the 2019 Pan American Games in Lima, Peru, where he also competed in the 800 meter freestyle.

In 2025, Sweetser joined the staff of Yale University's swimming and diving team as an Assistant Swim Coach, where he was mentored by Head Coach Jim Henry.
