= Athletics at the 2019 Pan American Games – Men's high jump =

Men's high jump at the 2019 Pan American Games
- Venue: Athletics Stadium
- Dates: August 9
- Competitors: 14 from 11 nations
- Winning height: 2.30

Medalists
Gold medal	Luis Zayas	Cuba
Silver medal	Michael Mason	Canada
Bronze medal	Roberto Vilches	Mexico

The men's high jump competition of the athletics events at the 2019 Pan American Games took place on the 9 of August at the 2019 Pan American Games Athletics Stadium. The defending Pan American Games champion was Derek Drouin from Canada.

== Summary ==
Four men made it over 2.26m; Luis Zayas, Michael Mason and Roberto Vílches, on their second try and Fernando Ferreira on his third. Zayas and Vilches had an earlier miss each, putting Mason into the lead. Zayas cleared 2.28 to take the lead, Mason got over on his second attempt. Vilches was left with bronze when he and Ferreira couldn't make the height. At 2.30 m (7 ft 6 1/2 in), Zayas made his personal best on his second attempt. Mason then passed to try to make 2.32m, 1 cm below his best, for the win.

== Records ==
Prior to this competition, the existing world and Pan American Games records were as follows:

World record	Javier Sotomayor (CUB)	2.45	Salamanca, Spain	July 27, 1993
Pan American Games record	Javier Sotomayor (CUB)	2.40	Mar del Plata, Argentine	March 25, 1995

== Schedule ==
Date	Time	Round
August 9, 2019	16:50	Final

== Results ==
All times shown are in meters.

KEY:	q	Fastest non-qualifiers	Q	Qualified	NR	National record	PB	Personal best	SB	Seasonal best	DQ	Disqualified

=== Final ===
The results were as follows

Rank	Name	Nationality	2.05	2.10	2.15	2.18	2.21	2.24	2.26	2.28	2.30	2.32	Mark	Notes
1st place, gold medalist(s)	Luis Zayas	Cuba	–	–	o	o	o	xo	xo	o	xo	x-	2.30	PB
2nd place, silver medalist(s)	Michael Mason	Canada	–	o	o	o	o	o	xo	xo	x-	xx	2.28	
3rd place, bronze medalist(s)	Roberto Vílches	Mexico	–	o	o	o	xo	o	xo	xxx			2.26	
4	Fernando Ferreira	Brazil	–	o	o	o	o	xo	xxo	xxx			2.26	SB
5	Keenon Laine	United States	–	–	o	o	xxo	o	xxx				2.24	
6	Jeron Robinson	United States	–	–	o	xo	o	xxx					2.21	
7	Eure Yáñez	Venezuela	–	o	xxo	–	xo	xxx					2.21	
8	Luis Castro	Puerto Rico	–	o	–	xxo	xxx						2.18	
9	Arturo Chávez	Peru	o	xo	o	xxx							2.15	=SB
9	Edgar Rivera	Mexico	–	xo	o	xxx							2.15	
11	Carlos Layoy	Argentina	–	xxo	xxx								2.10	
11	Donald Thomas	Bahamas	–	xxo	–	x-	xx						2.10	
13	Jermaine Francis	Saint Kitts and Nevis	xxo	xxo	xxx								2.10	=SB
	Jamal Wilson	Bahamas	–	–	xxx								NM	
