= Vinicius Lanza =

Brazilian swimmer (born 1997)

Personal information
- Full name: Vinicius Moreira Lanza
- Nickname: Vini
- Nationality: Brazil
- Born: 22 March 1997 (age 29) Belo Horizonte, Minas Gerais, Brazil
- Height: 1.91 m (6 ft 3 in)
- Weight: 90 kg (198 lb)

Sport
- Sport: Swimming
- Strokes: Butterfly, individual medley
- Club: Minas TC, London Roar (ISL)
- College team: Indiana Hoosiers
Medal record
Representing Brazil
Pan Pacific Championships
Bronze medal – third place	2018 Tokyo	100 m butterfly
Pan American Games
Gold medal – first place	2019 Lima	4×100 m mixed medley
Silver medal – second place	2019 Lima	4×100 m medley
Silver medal – second place	2023 Santiago	100 m butterfly
Silver medal – second place	2023 Santiago	4×100 m medley
Bronze medal – third place	2019 Lima	100 m butterfly
World Junior Championships
Silver medal – second place	2015 Singapore	100 m butterfly

Vinicius Moreira Lanza (born 22 March 1997, in Belo Horizonte) is a Brazilian swimmer. He competed at the collegiate level for Indiana University. He is a member of the London Roar team, competing in Season 2 of the International Swimming League (ISL). The ISL is an annual professional swimming league featuring a team-based competition format with fast-paced race sessions. Ten teams featuring the world's best swimmers will compete for the ISL title in 2020.

== International career ==
=== 2015–20 ===
At the 2015 FINA World Junior Swimming Championships, he won a silver medal in the 100-metre butterfly.

He was at the 2017 Summer Universiade, finishing 7th in the Men's 100 metre butterfly.

At the 2018 Pan Pacific Swimming Championships in Japan, he won a bronze medal in the 100-metre butterfly, with a time of 51.44 . He also finished 4th in the Men's 4 × 100 metre medley relay.

On 25 August 2018, at the José Finkel Trophy(short course competition), he broke the South American record in the 200m medley with a time of 1:52.16.

At the 2019 World Aquatics Championships in Gwangju, South Korea, in the Men's 4 × 100 metre medley relay, he finished 6th, helping Brazil qualify for the Tokyo 2020 Olympics. He also finished 12th in the Men's 100 metre butterfly, and 28th in the Men's 50 metre butterfly.

At the 2019 Pan American Games held in Lima, Peru, Lanza won a gold medal in the Mixed 4 × 100 metre medley relay (by participating at heats), a silver medal in the Men's 4 × 100 metre medley relay, and a bronze medal in the Men's 100 metre butterfly.

=== 2020 Summer Olympics ===
He competed at the 2020 Summer Olympics, where he finished 26th in the Men's 100 metre butterfly, 25th in the Men's 200 metre individual medley and was disqualified at the Men's 4 × 100 metre medley relay.

=== 2021–24 ===
At the 2021 FINA World Swimming Championships (25 m) in Abu Dhabi, United Arab Emirates, he finished 4th in the Men's 4 × 50 metre medley relay, 4th in the Men's 4 × 100 metre medley relay, 10th in the Men's 100 metre butterfly and 21st in the Men's 50 metre butterfly.

At the 2022 World Aquatics Championships held in Budapest, Hungary, he finished 23rd in the Men's 200 metre individual medley, 25th in the Men's 100 metre butterfly and 41st in the Men's 50 metre butterfly.

On 22 December 2022, Lanza announced his engagement to fellow Olympic and American swimmer Annie Lazor, whom he knew from training with her at Indiana University in Bloomington.

At the 2023 Pan American Games, Lanza won a silver medal in the 100m butterfly, and another in Brazil's 4x100m medley relay.

== Personal life ==
On 22 December 2022, Lanza announced his engagement to fellow Olympian and American swimmer Annie Lazor whom he had known from training extensively with at Indiana University in Bloomington.
