= Athletics at the 2019 Pan American Games – Women's 200 metres =

Women's 200 metres at the 2019 Pan American Games
- Venue: Athletics Stadium
- Dates: August 8 – August 9
- Competitors: 20 from 13 nations
- Winning time: 22.43

Medalists
Gold medal	Shelly-Ann Fraser-Pryce	Jamaica
Silver medal	Vitória Cristina Rosa	Brazil
Bronze medal	Tynia Gaither	Bahamas

The women's 200 metres competition of the athletics events at the 2019 Pan American Games will take place between the 8 and 9 of August at the 2019 Pan American Games Athletics Stadium. The defending Pan American Games champion is Kaylin Whitney from United States.

== Summary ==
Sporting bright green hair, the diminutive 2013 world champion Shelly-Ann Fraser-Pryce stood out from the crowd. When the gun fired, she stood out again, taking the lead she would not relinquish. Vitória Cristina Rosa ran a personal best to get silver almost 2 steps behind.

== Records ==
Prior to this competition, the existing world and Pan American Games records were as follows:

World record	Florence Griffith-Joyner (USA)	21.34	Seoul, South Korea	September 29, 1988
Pan American Games record	Evelyn Ashford (USA)	22.45	San Juan, Puerto Rico	July 9, 1979

== Schedule ==
Date	Time	Round
August 8, 2019	15:30	Semifinal
August 9, 2019	16:15	Final

== Results ==
All times shown are in seconds.

KEY:	q	Fastest non-qualifiers	Q	Qualified	NR	National record	PB	Personal best	SB	Seasonal best	DQ	Disqualified

=== Semifinal ===
Qualification: First 2 in each heat (Q) and next 2 fastest (q) qualified for the final.
Wind:
Heat 1: -1.0 m/s, Heat 2: 0.0 m/s, Heat 3: +0.4 m/s

Rank	Heat	Name	Nationality	Time	Notes
1	3	Vitória Cristina Rosa	Brazil	22.72	Q, PB
2	1	Shelly-Ann Fraser-Pryce	Jamaica	22.90	Q
3	2	Crystal Emmanuel	Canada	23.06	Q
4	3	Tynia Gaither	Bahamas	23.06	Q
5	1	Ángela Tenorio	Ecuador	23.16	Q
6	3	Semoy Hackett	Trinidad and Tobago	23.31	q, SB
7	1	Marileidy Paulino	Dominican Republic	23.40	Q
8	2	Anthonique Strachan	Bahamas	23.41	q
9	3	Schillonie Calvert	Jamaica	23.46	
10	1	Mauricia Prieto	Trinidad and Tobago	23.66	
11	2	Lorraine Barbosa	Brazil	23.74	
12	3	Mariely Sánchez	Dominican Republic	23.88	
13	1	Yunisleidy García	Cuba	23.92	
14	2	Isidora Jiménez	Chile	23.92	
15	1	Lynna Irby	United States	23.93	
16	3	Kanika Beckles	Grenada	23.99	
17	1	Halle Hazzard	Grenada	24.03	
18	2	Brenessa Thompson	Guyana	24.20	
19	3	Aiyanna Stiverne	Canada	24.25	
20	2	Nercely Soto	Venezuela	24.67	

=== Final ===
The results were as follows

Wind: -0.1 m/s

Rank	Lane	Name	Nationality	Time	Notes
1st place, gold medalist(s)	6	Shelly-Ann Fraser-Pryce	Jamaica	22.43	GR
2nd place, silver medalist(s)	4	Vitória Cristina Rosa	Brazil	22.62	PB
3rd place, bronze medalist(s)	5	Tynia Gaither	Bahamas	22.76	
4	7	Crystal Emmanuel	Canada	22.89	=SB
5	8	Anthonique Strachan	Bahamas	22.97	
6	9	Ángela Tenorio	Ecuador	23.08	SB
7	2	Marileidy Paulino	Dominican Republic	23.29	
8	3	Semoy Hackett	Trinidad and Tobago	23.62	
