= Swimming at the 2019 Pan American Games – Women's 200 metre breaststroke =

Women's 200 metre breaststroke at the 2019 Pan American Games
- Venue: Villa Deportiva Nacional, VIDENA
- Dates: August 8 (preliminaries and finals)
- Competitors: 21 from 11 nations
- Winning time: 2:21.40

Medalists
Gold medal	Anne Lazor	United States
Silver medal	Bethany Galat	United States
Bronze medal	Julia Sebastián	Argentina

The women's 200 metre breaststroke competition of the swimming events at the 2019 Pan American Games are scheduled to be held August 8, 2019 at the Villa Deportiva Nacional Videna cluster.

== Records ==
Prior to this competition, the existing world and Pan American Games records were as follows:

World record	Rikke Møller Pedersen (DEN)	2:19.11	Barcelona, Spain	August 1, 2013
Pan American Games record	Kierra Smith (CAN)	2:24.38	Toronto, Canada	July 15, 2015

== Results ==
KEY:	q	Fastest non-qualifiers	Q	Qualified	GR	Games record	NR	National record	PB	Personal best	SB	Seasonal best

=== Heats ===
The first round will be held on August 8.

Rank	Heat	Lane	Name	Nationality	Time	Notes
1	3	4	Anne Lazor	United States	2:26.71	QA
2	3	5	Byanca Rodríguez Villanueva	Mexico	2:27.00	QA
3	2	4	Bethany Galat	United States	2:27.81	QA
4	2	5	Mary-Sophie Harvey	Canada	2:29.06	QA
5	1	4	Julia Sebastián	Argentina	2:29.27	QA
6	1	3	Tessa Cieplucha	Canada	2:30.09	QA
7	1	6	Laura Morley	Bahamas	2:30.21	QA, NR
8	2	3	Esther González	Mexico	2:30.26	QA
9	3	3	Macarena Ceballos	Argentina	2:32.08	QB
10	1	5	Pâmela de Souza	Brazil	2:32.11	QB
11	2	6	Margaret Higgs	Bahamas	2:33.67	QB
12	3	2	Mercedes Toledo	Venezuela	2:34.29	QB
13	3	6	Bruna Leme	Brazil	2:35.20	QB
14	2	1	Krista Jurado Schmoock	Guatemala	2:41.14	QB
15	1	2	Daysi Ramírez Garlobo	Cuba	2:42.93	QB
16	2	7	Elisa Funes Jovel	El Salvador	2:43.92	QB
17	2	2	Emily Santos	Panama	2:45.21	
18	3	7	Micaela Sierra Graf	Uruguay	2:46.88	
19	3	1	Mariagracia Torres Nole	Peru	2:47.59	
20	1	1	Emilie Grand'Pierre	Haiti	2:51.71	
21	1	7	Adriana Buendia Cornejo	Peru	2:52.33	

=== Final B ===
The B final was also held on August 8.

Rank	Lane	Name	Nationality	Time	Notes
9	5	Pâmela de Souza	Brazil	2:31.30	
10	2	Bruna Leme	Brazil	2:31.98	
11	4	Macarena Ceballos	Argentina	2:33.80	
12	3	Margaret Higgs	Bahamas	2:34.17	
13	6	Mercedes Toledo	Venezuela	2:34.37	
14	8	Elisa Funes Jovel	El Salvador	2:41.49	NR
15	7	Krista Jurado Schmoock	Guatemala	2:42.98	
16	1	Daysi Ramírez Garlobo	Cuba	2:47.13	

=== Final A ===
The A final was also held on August 8.

Rank	Lane	Name	Nationality	Time	Notes
1st place, gold medalist(s)	4	Anne Lazor	United States	2:21.40	GR
2nd place, silver medalist(s)	3	Bethany Galat	United States	2:21.84	
3rd place, bronze medalist(s)	2	Julia Sebastián	Argentina	2:25.43	
4	5	Byanca Rodríguez Villanueva	Mexico	2:25.81	
5	6	Mary-Sophie Harvey	Canada	2:28.56	
6	8	Esther González	Mexico	2:28.98	
7	7	Tessa Cieplucha	Canada	2:29.59	
8	1	Laura Morley	Bahamas	2:32.87	
