= Venezuela at the 2019 Pan American Games =

- IOC code: VEN
- NOC: Comité Olímpico Venezolano
- Website: www.cov.com.ve

in Lima, Peru 26 July–11 August 2019
- Competitors: 280 in 30 sports
- Flag bearer: Elvismar Rodríguez
- Medals Ranked 12th: Gold 9 Silver 14 Bronze 20 Total 43

Pan American Games appearances (overview)
- 1951; 1955; 1959; 1963; 1967; 1971; 1975; 1979; 1983; 1987; 1991; 1995; 1999; 2003; 2007; 2011; 2015; 2019; 2023; 2027

Venezuela competed in the 2019 Pan American Games in Lima, Peru from July 26 to August 11, 2019.

The Venezuelan delegation consisted of 280 athletes (153 men and 127 women).

== Competitors ==
The following is the list of number of competitors (per gender) participating at the games per sport/discipline.

| Sport | Men | Women | Total |
|---|---|---|---|
| Archery | 1 | 2 | 3 |
| Athletics | 14 | 12 | 26 |
| Badminton | 1 | 1 | 2 |
| Basketball | 16 | 4 | 20 |
| Basque pelota | 1 | 2 | 3 |
| Bodybuilding | 1 | 1 | 2 |
| Bowling | 2 | 2 | 4 |
| Boxing | 4 | 2 | 6 |
| Canoeing | 4 | 6 | 10 |
| Cycling | 11 | 6 | 17 |
| Diving | 2 | 3 | 5 |
| Equestrian | 4 | 1 | 5 |
| Fencing | 6 | 7 | 13 |
| Golf | 2 | 2 | 4 |
| Gymnastics | 5 | 8 | 13 |
| Judo | 5 | 3 | 8 |
| Karate | 5 | 5 | 10 |
| Modern pentathlon | 2 | 0 | 2 |
| Racquetball | 0 | 1 | 1 |
| Roller sports | 2 | 2 | 4 |
| Rowing | 3 | 0 | 3 |
| Sailing | 3 | 3 | 6 |
| Shooting | 5 | 0 | 5 |
| Softball | 15 | 15 | 30 |
| Surfing | 3 | 3 | 6 |
| Swimming | 12 | 11 | 23 |
| Table tennis | 2 | 1 | 3 |
| Taekwondo | 3 | 4 | 7 |
| Triathlon | 0 | 1 | 1 |
| Volleyball | 2 | 0 | 2 |
| Water polo | 0 | 11 | 11 |
| Weightlifting | 6 | 4 | 10 |
| Wrestling | 11 | 4 | 15 |
| Total | 153 | 127 | 280 |

== Medalists ==
The following Venezuelan competitors won medals at the games. In the by discipline sections below, medalists' names are bolded.

| Medal | Name | Sport | Event | Date |
|---|---|---|---|---|
| Gold | Génesis Rodríguez | Weightlifting | Women's –55 kg | July 28 |
| Gold | Julio Mayora | Weightlifting | Men's –73 kg | July 28 |
| Gold | Rubén Limardo | Fencing | Men's individual épée | August 5 |
| Gold | Luis Avendaño | Wrestling | Men's Greco-Roman 87 kg | August 7 |
| Gold | Antonio Díaz | Karate | Men's kata individual | August 9 |
| Gold | Yulimar Rojas | Athletics | Women's triple jump | August 9 |
| Gold | Elvismar Rodríguez | Judo | Women's -70 Kg | August 10 |
| Gold | Daniel Dhers | Cycling | Men's BMX freestyle | August 11 |
| Gold | Andrés Madera | Karate | Men's -67 Kg | August 11 |
| Silver | Jesús González | Weightlifting | Men's –109 kg | July 29 |
| Silver | Hersony Canelón | Cycling | Men's keirin | August 4 |
| Silver | Jesús Limardo | Fencing | Men's individual épée | August 5 |
| Silver | Patrizia Piovesan | Fencing | Women's individual épée | August 7 |
| Silver | Wuileixis Rivas | Wrestling | Men's Greco-Roman 77 kg | August 7 |
| Silver | Betzabeth Argüello | Wrestling | Women's freestyle 53 kg | August 8 |
| Silver | Moisés Pérez | Wrestling | Men's Greco-Roman 130 kg | August 8 |
| Silver | Jhoan Guzmán | Roller sports | Men's 300 metres time-trial | August 9 |
| Silver | Pedro Ceballos | Wrestling | Men's Freestyle 86 Kg | August 10 |
| Silver | Anriquelis Barrios | Judo | Women's 63 Kg | August 10 |
| Silver | Claudymar Garcés | Karate | Women's 61 Kg | August 10 |
| Silver | José Díaz | Wrestling | Men's Freestyle 97 Kg | August 10 |
| Silver | Pedro Pineda | Judo | Men's +100 Kg | August 11 |
| Silver | Omaira Molina | Karate | Women's +68 Kg | August 11 |
| Bronze | Yusleidy Figueroa | Weightlifting | Women's –59 kg | July 28 |
| Bronze | Keydomar Vallenilla | Weightlifting | Men's –96 kg | July 29 |
| Bronze | Luis Cabrera | Boxing | Men's –60 kg | July 30 |
| Bronze | Gabriel Maestre | Boxing | Men's –69 kg | July 30 |
| Bronze | Nalek Korbaj | Boxing | Men's –81 kg | July 30 |
| Bronze | Irismar Cardozo | Boxing | Women's –51 kg | July 30 |
| Bronze | Alejandra Benítez | Fencing | Women's individual sabre | August 6 |
| Bronze | Luillys Pérez | Wrestling | Men's Greco-Roman 97 kg | August 7 |
| Bronze | Rubén Limardo; Francisco Limardo; Jesús Limardo; Grabiel Lugo | Fencing | Men's team épée | August 8 |
| Bronze | Andrea Armada | Karate | Women's kata individual | August 9 |
| Bronze | Stefany Hernández | Cycling | Women's BMX racing | August 9 |
| Bronze | Ricardo Valderrama | Judo | Men's -66 Kg | August 9 |
| Bronze | Jhoan Guzmán | Roller sports | Men's 500 m | August 10 |
| Bronze | Rosa Rodríguez | Athletics | Women's hammer throw | August 10 |
| Bronze | Patrizia Piovesan; Lizze Asis; María Martínez | Fencing | Women's team épée | August 10 |
| Bronze | Luis Vívenes | Wrestling | Men's Freestyle 125 Kg | August 10 |
| Bronze | Marianth Cuervo | Karate | Women's 68 Kg | August 11 |
| Bronze | Jovanni Martínez | Karate | Men's 60 Kg | August 11 |
| Bronze | Freddy Valera | Karate | Men's 84 Kg | December 26 |
| Bronze | Hersony Canelón | Cycling | Men's sprint | December 26 |

Medals by sport
| **Sport** | 1st place, gold medalist(s) | 2nd place, silver medalist(s) | 3rd place, bronze medalist(s) | Total |
| Athletics | 1 | 0 | 1 | 2 |
| Boxing | 0 | 0 | 4 | 4 |
| Cycling | 1 | 1 | 2 | 4 |
| Fencing | 1 | 2 | 3 | 6 |
| Judo | 1 | 2 | 1 | 4 |
| Karate | 2 | 2 | 4 | 8 |
| Roller sports | 0 | 1 | 1 | 2 |
| Weightlifting | 2 | 1 | 2 | 5 |
| Wrestling | 1 | 5 | 2 | 8 |
| Total | 9 | 14 | 20 | 43 |

Medals by day
| **Day** | **Date** | 1st place, gold medalist(s) | 2nd place, silver medalist(s) | 3rd place, bronze medalist(s) | Total |
| 1 | July 27 | 0 | 0 | 0 | 0 |
| 2 | July 28 | 2 | 0 | 1 | 3 |
| 3 | July 29 | 0 | 1 | 1 | 2 |
| 4 | July 30 | 0 | 0 | 4 | 4 |
| 5 | July 31 | 0 | 0 | 0 | 0 |
| 6 | August 1 | 0 | 0 | 0 | 0 |
| 7 | August 2 | 0 | 0 | 0 | 0 |
| 8 | August 3 | 0 | 0 | 1 | 1 |
| 9 | August 4 | 0 | 1 | 0 | 1 |
| 10 | August 5 | 1 | 1 | 0 | 2 |
| 11 | August 6 | 0 | 0 | 1 | 1 |
| 12 | August 7 | 1 | 2 | 1 | 4 |
| 13 | August 8 | 0 | 2 | 1 | 3 |
| 14 | August 9 | 2 | 1 | 3 | 6 |
| 15 | August 10 | 1 | 4 | 5 | 10 |
| 16 | August 11 | 2 | 2 | 2 | 6 |
| Total | | 9 | 14 | 20 | 43 |

Medals by gender
| **Gender** | 1st place, gold medalist(s) | 2nd place, silver medalist(s) | 3rd place, bronze medalist(s) | **Total** | **Percentage** |
| Female | 3 | 5 | 8 | **16** | 37 % |
| Male | 6 | 9 | 12 | **27** | 63 % |
| Total | 9 | 14 | 20 | 43 | 100% |

== Archery ==
Venezuela qualified a team of three archers through the 2018 Pan American Archery Championships.

Men

| Athlete | Event | Ranking round | | Round of 32 | Round of 16 | Quarterfinal | Semifinal | Final / BM | |
| Athlete | Event | Score | Rank | Opposition Result | Opposition Result | Opposition Result | Opposition Result | Opposition Result | Rank |
|---|---|---|---|---|---|---|---|---|---|
| Elías Malavé | Individual recurve | 654 | 17 | Stevens (CUB); L 5-6 | Did not advance | | | | |

Women

| Athlete | Event | Ranking round | | Round of 32 | Round of 16 | Quarterfinal | Semifinal | Final / BM | |
| Athlete | Event | Score | Rank | Opposition Result | Opposition Result | Opposition Result | Opposition Result | Opposition Result | Rank |
|---|---|---|---|---|---|---|---|---|---|
| Mayra Méndez | Individual recurve | 614 | 15 | Sliachticas (BRA); L 1-7 | Did not advance | | | | |
| Ana Mendoza | Individual compound | 699 | 2 | —N/a | Bye | González (ARG); L 140-143 | Did not advance | | |

Mixed

| Athlete | Event | Ranking round | | Round of 16 | Quarterfinal | Semifinal | Final / BM | |
| Athlete | Event | Score | Rank | Opposition Result | Opposition Result | Opposition Result | Opposition Result | Rank |
|---|---|---|---|---|---|---|---|---|
| Elías Malavé; Mayra Méndez | Team recurve | 1268 | 10 | —N/a | Argentina; L 1-5 | Did not advance | | 9 |

== Athletics ==
Venezuelan athletics participates in the Pan American Games in Lima 2019, after the Association of Panamerican Athletics (APA) confirmed 23 places for the criollos. Ten women and 13 men are included in the product list by the APA, then meet the minimum marks set by the Technical Committee and enter the quotas assigned for each test. Yulimar Rojas, who will be presented in Lima as a member of Team PanamSports.

Men
Track & road events

| Athlete | Event | Semifinals | | Final | |
| Athlete | Event | Time | Rank | Time | Rank |
|---|---|---|---|---|---|
| Kelvis Padrino | 400 m | 46.99 | 14 | Did not advance | |
| Lucirio Antonio Garrido | 800 m | 1:49.51 | 6 q | DNS | 8 |
| José Peña | 3000 m steeplechase | —N/a | | 9:02.04 | 9 |
| Alberto Aguilar; Abdel Kalil; Alexis Nieves; Rafael Vásquez | 4 × 100 m relay | —N/a | | 39.73 | 8 |
| Alberto Aguilar; Kelvis Padrino; Omar Longart; Usvart Zulueta | 4 × 400 m relay | —N/a | | | |
| Richard Vargas | 20 km walk | —N/a | | 1:25:08 | 8 |

Key: Q=Qualified for next round based on position in heat; q=Qualified for next round as fastest loser; *=Athlete ran in a preliminary round but not the final

Field events

| Athlete | Event | Qualification | | Final | |
| Athlete | Event | Distance | Rank | Distance | Rank |
|---|---|---|---|---|---|
| Eure Yáñez | High jump | —N/a | | 2.21 | 7 |
| Leodan Torrealba | Triple jump | —N/a | | 16.27 | 7 |

Key: Q=Qualify for final based on position in group; q=Qualify for final based on position in field without meeting qualifying mark

Combined event – Decathlon

| Athlete | Event | 100 m | LJ | SP | HJ | 400 m | 110 H | DT | PV | JT | 1500 m | Final | Rank |
|---|---|---|---|---|---|---|---|---|---|---|---|---|---|
| Georni Jaramillo | Result | 10.87 | 7.18 | 15.84 | 1.85 | 48.91 | 14.27 | 45.36 | 4.40 | 59.86 | 4:51.77 | 7913 | 4 |
| Georni Jaramillo | Points | 890 | 857 | 841 | 670 | 866 | 940 | 774 | 731 | 736 | 608 | 7913 | 4 |
| Gerson Izaguirre | Result | 11.21 | 7.29 | 12.28 | 1.94 | 50.78 | 14.54 | 40.40 | 4.60 | 54.23 | 5:02.21 | 7415 | 7 |
| Gerson Izaguirre | Points | 814 | 883 | 623 | 749 | 779 | 906 | 673 | 790 | 651 | 547 | 7415 | 7 |

Women
Track & road events

| Athlete | Event | Semifinals | | Final | |
| Athlete | Event | Time | Rank | Time | Rank |
|---|---|---|---|---|---|
| Andrea Purica | 100 m | 11.64 | 9 | Did not advance | |
| Nercely Soto | 200 m | 24.67 | 20 | Did not advance | |
| Génesis Romero | 100 m hurdles | 13.18 | 8 q | 13.44 | 8 |
| Yoveinny Mota | 100 m hurdles | 13.60 | 13 | Did not advance | |
| Nediam Vargas; Andrea Purica; Génesis Romero; Aries Sánchez | 4 × 100 m relay | —N/a | | 44.73 | 6 |
| Arelys Rodríguez | Marathon | —N/a | | 2:47:05 | 14 |

Key: Q=Qualified for next round based on position in heat; q=Qualified for next round as fastest loser; *=Athlete ran in a preliminary round but not the final

Field events

| Athlete | Event | Qualification | | Final | |
| Athlete | Event | Distance | Rank | Distance | Rank |
|---|---|---|---|---|---|
| Aries Sánchez | Long jump | —N/a | | 6.15 | 12 |
| Yulimar Rojas | Triple jump | —N/a | | 15.11 | 1st place, gold medalist(s) |
| Robeilys Peinado | Pole vault | —N/a | | 4.55 | 4 |
| Ahymara Espinoza | Shot put | —N/a | | 16.49 | 10 |
| Rosa Rodríguez | Hammer throw | —N/a | | 69.48 | 3rd place, bronze medalist(s) |

Key: Q=Qualify for final based on position in group; q=Qualify for final based on position in field without meeting qualifying mark

Combined event – Heptathlon

| Athlete | Event | 100 H | HJ | SP | 200 m | LJ | JT | 800 m | Final | Rank |
|---|---|---|---|---|---|---|---|---|---|---|
| Luisaris Toledo | Result | DNS | DNF | | | | | | | |
| Luisaris Toledo | Points | DNS | DNF | | | | | | | |

== Badminton ==
Venezuela qualified a team of two badminton athletes (one per gender).

| Athlete | Event | Round of 64 | Round of 32 | Round of 16 | Quarterfinals | Semifinals | Final | Rank |
| Athlete | Event | Opposition Result | Opposition Result | Opposition Result | Opposition Result | Opposition Result | Opposition Result | Rank |
|---|---|---|---|---|---|---|---|---|
| Frank Barrios | Men's singles | Bye | Lam (USA); L 0-2 | Did not advance | | | | |
| Tiffany Sanchez | Women's singles | Rodriguez (CUB); L 0-2 | Did not advance | | | | | |
| Frank Barrios; Tiffany Sanchez | Mixed doubles | —N/a | Leon / Montre (CHI); L 0-2 | Did not advance | | | | |

== Basketball ==
Venezuela qualified a team of 4 athletes for the 3x3 competition by virtue of being in the top 5 of the FIBA Ranking of November 2018.

=== 5 × 5 ===
Summary

| Team | Event | Preliminary round | | | | Semifinal | Final / BM / Pl. | |
| Team | Event | Opposition Result | Opposition Result | Opposition Result | Rank | Opposition Result | Opposition Result | Rank |
|---|---|---|---|---|---|---|---|---|
| Venezuela men: Luis Bethelmy; Michael Carrera; Pedro Chourio; Nestor Colmenares; Windi Graterol; Heissler Guillent; Dwight Lewis; Anthony Pérez; Miguel Ruiz; José Vargas; Gregory Vargas; Jhornan Zamora | Men's tournament | Puerto Rico; L 64-73 | United States; L 53-70 | Virgin Islands; W 87-84 | 3 | Did not advance | Uruguay; W 78-68 | 5 |

==== Men's tournament ====
Preliminary round

| Team | Pld | W | L | PF | PA | PD | Pts | Qualification |
|---|---|---|---|---|---|---|---|---|
| Puerto Rico | 3 | 3 | 0 | 261 | 237 | +24 | 6 | Qualified for the Semifinals |
| United States | 3 | 2 | 1 | 273 | 224 | +49 | 5 | Qualified for the Semifinals |
| Venezuela | 3 | 1 | 2 | 204 | 227 | −23 | 4 | |
| Virgin Islands | 3 | 0 | 3 | 257 | 307 | −50 | 3 | |

31 July 2019
13:30

Report

| Puerto Rico | 73–64 | Venezuela |
Scoring by quarter: 11–12, 15–18, 23–14, 24–20
| Pts: Collier 13; Rebs: Andujar 9 Asts: Collier 4 | | Pts: Colmenares, Zamora 12; Rebs: Colmenares 13; Asts: Vargas 8 |

Coliseo Eduardo Dibos, Lima
Referees: Leandro Lezcano (ARG)

1 August 2019
21:00

Report

| Venezuela | 53–70 | United States |
Scoring by quarter: 13–20, 16–14, 8–16, 16–20
| Pts: Colmenares 16; Rebs: Vargas 9 Asts: Colmenares, Vargas 2 | | Pts: Powell 30; Rebs: Gillespie 7 Asts: Diallo 3 |

Coliseo Eduardo Dibos, Lima
Referees: Cristiano Maranho (BRA)

2 August 2019
18:00

Report

| Virgin Islands | 84–87 | Venezuela |
Scoring by quarter: 19–19, 29–20, 15–24, 21–24
| Pts: Milligan 22; Rebs: three players 7 Asts: Hodge 3 | | Pts: Zamora 19; Rebs: Carrera 11; Asts: Vargas 4 |

Coliseo Eduardo Dibos, Lima
Referees: Michael Weiland (CAN)

Fifth place match

3 August 2019
13:30

Report

| Venezuela | 78–68 | Uruguay |
Scoring by quarter: 19–25, 17–12, 23–22, 19–9
| Pts: Zamora 15; Rebs: Graterol 7 Asts: Guillent 3 | | Pts: Rojas 17; Rebs: Wachsmann 7 Asts: Parodi 3 |

Coliseo Eduardo Dibos, Lima
Referees: Jorge Vazquez (PUR)

=== 3 × 3 ===
Summary

| Team | Event | Preliminary round | | | | | | Semifinal | Final / BM / Pl. | |
| Team | Event | Opposition Result | Opposition Result | Opposition Result | Opposition Result | Opposition Result | Rank | Opposition Result | Opposition Result | Rank |
|---|---|---|---|---|---|---|---|---|---|---|
| Venezuela men: José Ascanio; Michael Carrera; Edgar Martínez; Yohanner Sifontes | Men's tournament | United States; L 14-21 | Argentina; W 21-20 | Brazil; W 22-20 | Dominican Republic; L 18-22 | Puerto Rico; L 10-21 | 5 | Did not advance | Argentina; W 21-16 | 5 |
| Venezuela women: Yosimar Corrales; Ivaney Márquez; Waleska Pérez; Daniela Wallen | Women's tournament | Uruguay; W 14-8 | Brazil; L 20-22 | Dominican Republic; L 13-18 | United States; L 14-18 | Argentina; L 11-14 | 5 | Did not advance | Uruguay; W 21-11 | 5 |

==== Men's tournament ====
Preliminary round

| Pos | Team | Pld | W | L | PF | PA | PD | Qualification |
|---|---|---|---|---|---|---|---|---|
| 1 | Puerto Rico | 5 | 5 | 0 | 104 | 70 | +34 | Semifinals |
| 2 | Brazil | 5 | 3 | 2 | 101 | 91 | +10 | Semifinals |
| 3 | United States | 5 | 2 | 3 | 99 | 89 | +10 | Semifinals |
| 4 | Dominican Republic | 5 | 2 | 3 | 81 | 98 | −17 | Semifinals |
| 5 | Venezuela | 5 | 2 | 3 | 85 | 104 | −19 | Fifth place match |
| 6 | Argentina | 5 | 1 | 4 | 86 | 104 | −18 | Fifth place match |

Source: Report
Rules for classification: 1) Wins; 2) Head-to-head record; 3) Points scored.

27 July 2019
16:00

Report

| United States | 21–14 | Venezuela |
| Pts: Jones 12 | | Pts: Carrera 7 |

Coliseo Eduardo Dibos
Referees: Ángel Martínez (PUR) / Gonzalo Paz (URU)

27 July 2019
19:00

Report

| Venezuela | 21–20 | Argentina |
| Pts: Carrera 12 | | Pts: Romano 6 |

Coliseo Eduardo Dibos
Referees: Ángel Martínez (PUR) / Carolina Zachi (BRA)

28 July 2019
14:30

Report

| Brazil | 20–22 | Venezuela |
| Pts: Froehlich 10 | | Pts: Carrera 14 |

Coliseo Eduardo Dibos
Referees: Ángel Martínez (PUR) / Glenn Tuitt (USA)

28 July 2019
17:30

Report

| Venezuela | 18–22 | Dominican Republic |
| Pts: Sifontes, Carrera 7 | | Pts: Núñez 17 |

Coliseo Eduardo Dibos
Referees: Gonzalo Paz (URU) / Glenn Tuitt (USA)

28 July 2019
20:30

Report

| Puerto Rico | 21–10 | Venezuela |
| Pts: Fernández, Matías 7 | | Pts: Martínez 5 |

Coliseo Eduardo Dibos
Referees: Glenn Tuitt (USA) / Carolina Zachi (BRA)

Fifth place match

29 July 2019
11:30

Report

| Venezuela | 21–16 | Argentina |
| Pts: Carrera 11 | | Pts: Romano 6 |

Coliseo Eduardo Dibos
Referees: Ángel Martínez (PUR) / Glenn Tuitt (USA)

==== Women's tournament ====
Preliminary round

| Pos | Team | Pld | W | L | PF | PA | PD | Qualification |
|---|---|---|---|---|---|---|---|---|
| 1 | United States | 5 | 5 | 0 | 102 | 48 | +54 | Semifinals |
| 2 | Argentina | 5 | 4 | 1 | 76 | 68 | +8 | Semifinals |
| 3 | Dominican Republic | 5 | 3 | 2 | 68 | 73 | −5 | Semifinals |
| 4 | Brazil | 5 | 2 | 3 | 76 | 89 | −13 | Semifinals |
| 5 | Venezuela | 5 | 1 | 4 | 72 | 80 | −8 | Fifth place match |
| 6 | Uruguay | 5 | 0 | 5 | 55 | 91 | −36 | Fifth place match |

Source: Lima 2019
Rules for classification: 1) Wins; 2) Head-to-head record; 3) Points scored.

27 July 2019
15:00

Report

| Venezuela | 14–8 | Uruguay |
| Pts: Wallen, Pérez 5 | | Pts: Gayoso 3 |

Coliseo Eduardo Dibos
Referees: Glenn Tuitt (USA) / Carolina Zachi (BRA)

27 July 2019
18:30

Report

| Brazil | 22–20 | Venezuela |
| Pts: Mariano 8 | | Pts: Wallen 10 |

Coliseo Eduardo Dibos
Referees: Ángel Martínez (PUR) / Glenn Tuitt (USA)

27 July 2019
20:30

Report

| Venezuela | 13–18 | Dominican Republic |
| Pts: Wallen 7 | | Pts: Monsac, Hernández 6 |

Coliseo Eduardo Dibos
Referees: Sonia Maldonado (PUR) / Carolina Zachi (BRA)

28 July 2019
17:00

Report

| Venezuela | 14–18 | United States |
| Pts: Pérez 6 | | Pts: Hebard, Ionescu 7 |

Coliseo Eduardo Dibos
Referees: Gonzalo Paz (URU) / Carolina Zachi (BRA)

28 July 2019
19:30

Report

| Argentina | 14–11 | Venezuela |
| Pts: Boquete 8 | | Pts: Wallen 8 |

Coliseo Eduardo Dibos
Referees: Gonzalo Paz (URU) / Carolina Zachi (BRA)

Fifth place match

29 July 2019
11:00

Report

| Venezuela | 21–11 | Uruguay |
| Pts: Márquez 8 | | Pts: Gayoso 9 |

Coliseo Eduardo Dibos
Referees: Sonia Maldonado (PUR) / Carolina Zachi (BRA)

== Basque pelota ==
Venezuela is scheduled to compete in basque pelota.

Men

| Athlete | Event | Preliminary round | | | | | Final / BM | |
| Athlete | Event | Opposition Result | Opposition Result | Opposition Result | Opposition Result | Rank | Opposition Result | Rank |
|---|---|---|---|---|---|---|---|---|
| Jaime Vera | Rubber ball pelota singles | Rodríguez (MEX); L 0-2 | Blas (GUA); L 0-2 | Tejeda (USA); W 2-1 | Ramirez (URU); L 0-2 | 4 | Did not advance | 6 |

Women

| Athlete | Event | Preliminary round | | | | | Final / BM | |
| Athlete | Event | Opposition Result | Opposition Result | Opposition Result | Opposition Result | Rank | Opposition Result | Rank |
|---|---|---|---|---|---|---|---|---|
| Diana Rangel | Peruvian fronton singles | Durán (CUB); L 0-2 | Suárez (PER); L 0-2 | Spahn (ARG); W 2-1 | Valderrama (CHI); W 2-0 | 3 Q | Spahn (ARG); L 1-2 | 4 |
| Diana Rangel; María Borges | Frontenis doubles | Hernández – Cepeda (MEX); L 0-2 | Busson – Podversich (ARG); L 1-2 | —N/a | | 3 | Did not advance | 6 |

== Bodybuilding ==
Venezuela qualified a full team of two bodybuilders (one male and one female).

| Athlete | Event | Points | Rank |
|---|---|---|---|
| Villali Linarez | Men's classic bodybuilding | 58 | 4 |
| Paola Rodríguez | Women's Fitness | 44 | 5 |

== Bowling ==
Venezuela qualified two men and two women by virtue of being in the top 4 of the 2018 South American Games.

| Athlete | Event | Qualification / Final | | | | | | | | | | | | | | Round robin | | | | | | | | | | | Semifinal | Final / BM | |
| Athlete | Event | Block 1 | | | | | | Block 2 | | | | | | Total | Rank | Round robin | | | | | | | | | | | Semifinal | Final / BM | |
| Athlete | Event | 1 | 2 | 3 | 4 | 5 | 6 | 7 | 8 | 9 | 10 | 11 | 12 | Total | Rank | 1 | 2 | 3 | 4 | 5 | 6 | 7 | 8 | Total | Grand total | Rank | Opposition Result | Opposition Result | Rank |
|---|---|---|---|---|---|---|---|---|---|---|---|---|---|---|---|---|---|---|---|---|---|---|---|---|---|---|---|---|---|
| Luis Rovaina | Men's singles | 201 | 224 | 182 | 213 | 190 | 176 | 191 | 189 | 250 | 214 | 223 | 268 | 2521 | 20 | Did not advance | | | | | | | | | | | | | 20 |
| Ildemaro Ruiz | Men's singles | 225 | 215 | 202 | 214 | 200 | 182 | 268 | 213 | 227 | 216 | 181 | 204 | 2547 | 18 | Did not advance | | | | | | | | | | | | | 18 |
| Luis Rovaina; Ildemaro Ruiz | Men's doubles | 359 | 408 | 486 | 422 | 478 | 499 | 463 | 392 | 423 | 491 | 373 | 508 | 5302 | 7 | —N/a | | | | | | | | | | | | | |
| Patricia de Faría | Women's singles | 222 | 170 | 158 | 214 | 182 | 188 | 212 | 174 | 201 | 214 | 182 | 213 | 2330 | 20 | Did not advance | | | | | | | | | | | | | 20 |
| Karen Marcano | Women's singles | 199 | 116 | 265 | 215 | 185 | 171 | 218 | 211 | 203 | 238 | 184 | 183 | 2388 | 16 | Did not advance | | | | | | | | | | | | | 16 |
| Patricia de Faría; Karen Marcano | Women's doubles | 390 | 396 | 335 | 382 | 423 | 344 | 423 | 412 | 452 | 416 | 473 | 416 | 4862 | 7 | —N/a | | | | | | | | | | | | | |

== Boxing ==
Venezuela qualified six boxers (four men and two women).

Men

| Athlete | Event | Quarterfinal | Semifinal | Final | |
| Athlete | Event | Opposition Result | Opposition Result | Opposition Result | Rank |
|---|---|---|---|---|---|
| Luis Cabrera | –60 kg | Defreitas (JAM); W | de los Santos (DOM); L | Did not advance | 3rd place, bronze medalist(s) |
| Luis Arcón | –64 kg | Davis (USA); L | Did not advance | | |
| Gabriel Maestre | –69 kg | Miranda (PER); W | Polanco (DOM); L | Did not advance | 3rd place, bronze medalist(s) |
| Nalek Korbaj | –81 kg | Georges (DOM); W | La Cruz (CUB); L | Did not advance | 3rd place, bronze medalist(s) |

Women

| Athlete | Event | Quarterfinal | Semifinal | Final | |
| Athlete | Event | Opposition Result | Opposition Result | Opposition Result | Rank |
|---|---|---|---|---|---|
| Irismar Cardozo | –51 kg | Madrid (ESA); W | Fuchs (USA); L | Did not advance | 3rd place, bronze medalist(s) |
| Krisandy Rios | –60 kg | Ellis (USA); L | Did not advance | | |

== Canoeing ==
=== Slalom ===
Venezuela qualified a total of fourth slalom athletes (two men and two women).

| Athlete | Event | Preliminary round | | | Semifinal | | Final | |
| Athlete | Event | Run 1 | Run 2 | Rank | Time | Rank | Time | Rank |
|---|---|---|---|---|---|---|---|---|
| Melquisidec Vega | Men's C-1 | 159.84 | 94.71 | 5 Q | 106.06 | 5 Q | 102.13 | 5 |
| Alexis Pérez | Men's K-1 | 102.05 | 89.29 | 6 Q | 99.48 | 6 | Did not advance | |
| Alexis Pérez | Men's extreme K-1 | | | 3 | Did not advance | | | |
| Emily Vega | Women's K-1 | 322.65 | 195.38 | 9 | Did not advance | | | |
| Mariana Torres | Women's C-1 | 213.56 | 145.58 | 6 Q | 254.39 | 6 | Did not advance | |
| Mariana Torres | Women's extreme K-1 | DSQ | | | Did not advance | | | |

=== Sprint ===
Venezuela qualified a total of 6 sprint athletes (two men and four women).

Men

| Athlete | Event | Heat | | Semifinal | | Final | |
| Athlete | Event | Time | Rank | Time | Rank | Time | Rank |
|---|---|---|---|---|---|---|---|
| Edward Paredes | C-1 1000 m | 4:43.873 | 6 SF | 4:27.539 | 4 F | 4:09.201 | 5 |
| Edward Paredes; José Solano | C-2 1000 m | —N/a | | | | 3:56.523 | 4 |

Women

| Athlete | Event | Heat | | Semifinal | | Final | |
| Athlete | Event | Time | Rank | Time | Rank | Time | Rank |
|---|---|---|---|---|---|---|---|
| Mara Guerrero | K-1 200 m | 44.546 | 5 SF | 44.523 | 5 | Did not advance | 9 |
| Eliana Escalona | K-1 500 m | 2:11.143 | 5 SF | 2:08.721 | 5 | Did not advance | 9 |
| Eliana Escalona; Mara Guerrero | K-2 500 m | 1:59.905 | 4 SF | 1:55.625 | 3 F | 1:56.684 | 6 |
| Mara Guerrero; Eliana Escalona; Karla Patiño; Zulmary Sánchez | K-4 500 m | —N/a | | | | 1:45.223 | 6 |

Qualification legend: QF – Qualify to final; SF – Qualify to semifinal

== Cycling ==
Venezuelan cyclists qualified for the following events

=== Track ===
Sprint

| Athlete | Event | Qualification | | Round of 16 | Repechage 1 | Quarterfinals | Semifinals | Final | |
| Athlete | Event | Time | Rank | Opposition Time | Opposition Time | Opposition Result | Opposition Result | Opposition Result | Rank |
|---|---|---|---|---|---|---|---|---|---|
| Hersony Canelón | Men's | 10.196 | 6 Q | Fonseca (BRA); W 10.543 | —N/a | Botasso (ARG); W' 10.904 W 10.731 | Phillip (TTO); L | Quintero (COL); L | 3rd place, bronze medalist(s) |
| César Marcano | Men's | 10.364 | 12 Q | Phillip (TTO); L | Fonseca (BRA); Wammes (CAN); L | Did not advance | | | 12 |
| Hersony Canelón; César Marcano; Clever Martínez; Ángel Pulgar | Men's team | DNS | | Did not advance | | | | | 6 |

Keirin

| Athlete | Event | Heats | Final |
| Athlete | Event | Rank | Rank |
|---|---|---|---|
| Hersony Canelón | Men's | 2 Q | 2nd place, silver medalist(s) |

Omnium

| Athlete | Event | Scratch race | | Elimination race | | Time trial | | Points race | | Total | |
| Athlete | Event | Rank | Points | Rank | Points | Rank | Points | Points | Rank | Points | Rank |
|---|---|---|---|---|---|---|---|---|---|---|---|
| Ángel Pulgar | Men's | 8 | 26 | 4 | 34 | 11 | 20 | 6 | 20 | 100 | 6 |
| Angie González | Women's | 9 | 24 | 11 | 20 | 14 | 14 | 13 | 0 | 58 | 12 |

Madison

| Athlete | Event | Points | Rank |
|---|---|---|---|
| Clever Martínez; Máximo Rojas | Men's | -37 | 9 |
| Angie González; Zuralmy Rivas | Women's | DNS | |

=== Road ===
| Athlete | Event | Time | Rank |
|---|---|---|---|
| Orluis Aular | Men's road race | 4:08:13 | 11 |
| Ralph Monsalve | Men's road race | DNF | |
| Clever Martínez | Men's road race | DNF | |
| Máximo Rojas | Men's road race | DNF | |
| Orluis Aular | Men's time trial | 47:04.25 | 6 |
| Lilibeth Chacón | Women's road race | 2:19:53 | 15 |
| Wilmarys Moreno | Women's road race | 2:19:51 | 7 |
| Angie González | Women's road race | 2:20:34 | 27 |
| Wilmarys Moreno | Women's time trial | 28:27.65 | 17 |

=== BMX ===
Venezuela qualified two athlete for BMX Racing and two athletes for BMX Freestyle by virtue of being in the top 22 of the 2018 UCI BMX Men's Ranking and top 6 of the UCI BMX Freestyle Men's and Women's Ranking.

| Athlete | Event | Qualifying | | Quarterfinal | | Semifinal | | Final | |
| Athlete | Event | Time | Rank | Points | Rank | Points | Rank | Time | Rank |
|---|---|---|---|---|---|---|---|---|---|
| Jefferson Milano | Men's racing | 33.775 | 8 Q | 8 | 3 Q | 9 | 2 Q | DNF | 6 |
| Rubén García | Men's racing | 34.163 | 10 Q | 10 | 3 Q | 18 | 5 | Did not advance | 10 |
| Stefany Hernández | Women's racing | 38.674 | 3 Q | —N/a | | 5 | 2 Q | 38.106 | 3rd place, bronze medalist(s) |
| Daniel Dhers | Men's freestyle | 80.42 | 2 Q | —N/a | | | | 88.50 | 1st place, gold medalist(s) |
| Yeinkerly Hernández | Women's freestyle | 36.00 | 8 Q | —N/a | | | | 28.00 | 8 |

=== Mountain biking ===
Venezuela qualified one athlete by virtue of being in the top 16 of the 2018 Mountain Bike Pan American Continental Championships.

| Athlete | Event | Time | Rank |
|---|---|---|---|
| Yonathan Mejía | Men's cross-country | 1:32:57 | 10 |

== Diving ==
Venezuelan divers qualified for two individual and one team spots by virtue of a top 3 finish respectively at the 2018 CONSANAT Championships .

Men

| Athlete | Event | Preliminaries | | Final | |
| Athlete | Event | Points | Rank | Points | Rank |
|---|---|---|---|---|---|
| Óscar Ariza | 10 m platform | 332.20 | 14 | Did not advance | |
| Jesús González | 10 m platform | 264.80 | 16 | Did not advance | |
| Oscar Ariza; Jesús González | 10 m synchronised platform | —N/a | | 322.98 | 7 |

Women

| Athlete | Event | Preliminaries | | Final | |
| Athlete | Event | Points | Rank | Points | Rank |
|---|---|---|---|---|---|
| Elizabeth Pérez | 1m springboard | 202.90 | 12 Q | 230.60 | 10 |
| Elizabeth Pérez | 3 m springboard | 169.05 | 16 | Did not advance | |
| Lisette Ramirez | 10m platform | 215.45 | 12 Q | 216.85 | 11 |
| María Betancourt | 10m platform | 214.70 | 13 | Did not advance | |

== Equestrian ==
Venezuelan equestrians qualified teams in Jumping competition and have also qualified one athlete in the individual dressage competition.

=== Dressage ===
| Athlete | Horse | Event | Qualification | | | | | | Grand Prix Freestyle / Intermediate I Freestyle | |
| Athlete | Horse | Event | Grand Prix / Prix St. Georges | | Grand Prix Special / Intermediate I | | Total | | Grand Prix Freestyle / Intermediate I Freestyle | |
| Athlete | Horse | Event | Score | Rank | Score | Rank | Score | Rank | Score | Rank |
|---|---|---|---|---|---|---|---|---|---|---|
| Patricia Ferrando | Zen | Individual | 65.971 | 20 | 66.412 | 15 | 132.383 | 18 Q | 66.870 | 16 |

=== Jumping ===
| Athlete | Horse | Event | Qualification | | | | | | | | Final | | | | | |
| Athlete | Horse | Event | Round 1 | | Round 2 | | Round 3 | | Total | | Round A | | Round B | | Total | |
| Athlete | Horse | Event | Faults | Rank | Faults | Rank | Faults | Rank | Faults | Rank | Faults | Rank | Faults | Rank | Faults | Rank |
|---|---|---|---|---|---|---|---|---|---|---|---|---|---|---|---|---|
| Gustavo Arroyo | G&C Virko Minotais | Individual | 7.37 | 25 | 9 | 25 | 21 | 37 | 37.37 | 31 Q | 17 | 26 | Did not advance | | | 26 |
| Alejandro Karolyi | Lincourt Gino | Individual | 5.73 | 22 | 4 | 9 | 12 | 28 | 21.73 | 20 Q | 19 | 27 | Did not advance | | | 27 |
| Angel Karolyi | April Moon | Individual | 3.56 | 16 | 8 | 15 | 12 | 28 | 23.56 | 22 Q | Withdrew | | | | | 37 |
| Juan Ortiz | Rissoa d'Ag Bois Margot | Individual | 11.10 | 35 | 13 | 29 | 28 | 43 | 52.10 | 37 | Did not advance | | | | | 40 |
| Gustavo Arroyo; Alejandro Karolyi; Angel Karolyi; Juan Ortiz | As above | Team | 16.66 | 5 | 21 | 5 | 45 | 7 | 82.66 | 7 | —N/a | | | | | |

== Fencing ==
Venezuela qualified a team of 13 fencers (six men and seven women).

Men

| Athlete | Event | Ranking round | | | Round of 16 | Quarterfinal | Semifinal | Final / BM | |
| Athlete | Event | Victories | Defeats | Rank | Opposition Result | Opposition Result | Opposition Result | Opposition Result | Rank |
|---|---|---|---|---|---|---|---|---|---|
| Rubén Limardo | Individual épée | 4 | 1 | 3 Q | Ferreira (BRA); W 15-11 | Lugones (ARG); W 15-8 | Reytor (CUB); W 10-9 | J. Limardo (VEN); W 15-8 | 1st place, gold medalist(s) |
| Jesús Limardo | Individual épée | 5 | 0 | 1 Q | Bye | Schwantes (BRA); W 15-4 | Rodríguez (COL); W 11-10 | R. Limardo (VEN); L 8-15 | 2nd place, silver medalist(s) |
| Rubén Limardo; Francisco Limardo; Jesús Limardo | Team épée | —N/a | | | | Peru; W 45-23 | Cuba; L 42-43 | United States; W 45-43 | 3rd place, bronze medalist(s) |
| José Félix Quintero | Individual sabre | 4 | 1 | 6 Q | Rodríguez (CUB); W 15-10 | Homer (USA); L 12-15 | Did not advance | | 6 |
| Eliecer Romero | Individual sabre | 1 | 5 | 15 | Did not advance | | | | 15 |
| José Félix Quintero; Abraham Rodríguez; Eliecer Romero | Team sabre | —N/a | | | | Argentina; W 45-41 | United States; L 24-45 | Colombia; L 44-45 | 4 |

Women

| Athlete | Event | Ranking round | | | Round of 16 | Quarterfinal | Semifinal / 5-8 | Final / BM / 5-8 | |
| Athlete | Event | Victories | Defeats | Rank | Opposition Result | Opposition Result | Opposition Result | Opposition Result | Rank |
|---|---|---|---|---|---|---|---|---|---|
| María Martínez | Individual épée | 1 | 5 | 15 | Did not advance | | | | 15 |
| Patrizia Piovesan | Individual épée | 2 | 3 | 12 Q | Nixon (USA); W 15-9 | Doig (PER); W 14-11 | Di Tella (ARG); W 15-12 | Holmes (USA); L 10-14 | 2nd place, silver medalist(s) |
| Lizze Asis; María Martínez; Patrizia Piovesan | Team épée | —N/a | | | | Argentina; W 41-37 | United States; L 26-45 | Brazil; W 45-37 | 3rd place, bronze medalist(s) |
| Anabella Acurero | Individual foil | 2 | 3 | 10 Q | Moreno (CUB); W 15-7 | Harvey (CAN); L 5-15 | Did not advance | | 7 |
| Alejandra Benítez | Individual sabre | 5 | 0 | 1 Q | Bye | Blanco (COL); W 15-7 | Pérez (ARG); L 13-15 | Did not advance | 3rd place, bronze medalist(s) |
| Shia Rodríguez | Individual sabre | 3 | 2 | 8 Q | Blanco (COL); L 9-15 | Did not advance | | | 11 |
| Alejandra Benítez; Jornellys Velásquez; Shia Rodríguez | Team sabre | —N/a | | | | Dominican Republic; L 44-45 | Argentina; W 45-39 | Colombia; W 45-26 | 5 |

== Golf ==
Venezuela qualified a full team of four golfers (two men and two women).

| Athlete | Event | Round 1 | Round 2 | Round 3 | Round 4 | Total | | |
| Athlete | Event | Score | Score | Score | Score | Score | Par | Rank |
|---|---|---|---|---|---|---|---|---|
| Manuel Torres | Men's individual | 72 | 65 | 70 | 70 | 276 | −6 | T8 |
| Wolmer Murillo | Men's individual | 70 | 70 | 70 | 69 | 279 | −3 | T14 |
| Valentina Gilly | Women's individual | 71 | 72 | 72 | 72 | 287 | +3 | 6 |
| Vanessa Gilly | Women's individual | 69 | 76 | 75 | 77 | 297 | +13 | 19 |
| Manuel Torres; Wolmer Murillo; Valentina Gilly; Vanessa Gilly | Mixed team | 139 | 137 | 142 | 141 | 559 | −9 | T6 |

== Gymnastics ==
Venezuelas qualified a male team by virtue of being Top 8 the 2018 Pan American Gymnastics Championships and one female athlete for individual all around top 7 countries not already qualified, in the 2018 Pan American Gymnastics Championships.

=== Artistic ===
Men

Team final and individual qualification

| Athlete | Event | Apparatus | | | | | | Total | |
| Athlete | Event | F | PH | R | PB | V | HB | Score | Rank |
|---|---|---|---|---|---|---|---|---|---|
| Orlando Briceño | Team | —N/a | | 11.700 | —N/a | | | | |
| Jostyn Fuenmayor | Team | 12.750 | 12.300 | 12.300 | 14.000 | 12.700 | 12.700 | 76.750 | 17 Q |
| Maycol Puentes | Team | 13.500 | 10.500 | —N/a | 13.850 | 13.100 | 11.600 | | |
| Junior Rojo | Team | 12.900 | 12.150 | 12.950 | 14.550 | 12.000 | 11.550 | 76100 | |
| Adickxon Trejo | Team | 11.900 | 13.300 | 12.650 | 13.800 | 13.750 | 11.400 | 76.800 | 18 Q |
| Team | Team | 39.150 | 37.750 | 37.900 | 42.400 | 39.550 | 35.850 | 232.600 | 7 |

Individual finals

| Athlete | Event | Apparatus | | | | | | Total | |
| Athlete | Event | F | PH | R | PB | V | HB | Score | Rank |
|---|---|---|---|---|---|---|---|---|---|
| Jostyn Fuenmayor | All-around | 12.850 | 11.200 | 13.150 | 13.900 | 13.300 | 13.350 | 77.750 | 12 |
| Adickxon Trejo | All-around | 12.400 | 12.750 | 12.200 | 14.050 | 13.250 | 13.150 | 77.800 | 11 |

Women

Individual qualification

| Athlete | Event | Apparatus | | | | Total | |
| Athlete | Event | F | BB | V | UB | Score | Rank |
|---|---|---|---|---|---|---|---|
| Katriel de Sousa | Team | 13.250 | 10.250 | 10.950 | 11.850 | 46.300 | 28 Q |

Individual finals

| Athlete | Event | Apparatus | | | | Total | |
| Athlete | Event | F | BB | V | UB | Score | Rank |
|---|---|---|---|---|---|---|---|
| Katriel de Sousa | All-around | 12.950 | 11.750 | 9.550 | 11.650 | 45.900 | 21 |

=== Rhythmic ===
Individual

| Athlete | Event | Apparatus | | | | Total | |
| Athlete | Event | Hoop | Ball | Clubs | Ribbon | Score | Rank |
|---|---|---|---|---|---|---|---|
| Grisbel López | All-around | 14.550 | 14.700 | 14.200 | 13.050 | 56.500 | 12 |

Group

| Athlete | Event | Apparatus | | Total | |
| Athlete | Event | 5 balls | 3 hoops + 2 clubs | Score | Rank |
|---|---|---|---|---|---|
| María Ojeda; Sofía Suarez; Kizzy Rivas; Dahilin Parra; Juliette Quiroz | All-around | 18.350 | 19.900 | 38.250 | 6 |
| María Ojeda; Sofía Suarez; Kizzy Rivas; Dahilin Parra; Juliette Quiroz | Five balls | —N/a | | 17.550 | 6 |
| María Ojeda; Sofía Suarez; Kizzy Rivas; Dahilin Parra; Juliette Quiroz | 3 hoops + 2 clubs | —N/a | | 19.300 | 4 |

=== Trampoline ===
| Athlete | Event | Qualification | | Final | |
| Athlete | Event | Score | Rank | Score | Rank |
|---|---|---|---|---|---|
| Alida Rojo | Women's | 88.420 | 9 | Did not advance | |

== Judo ==
Venezuela qualified 13 judokas (six men and seven women).

Men

| Athlete | Event | Round of 16 | Quarterfinal | Semifinal | Repechage | Final / BM | |
| Athlete | Event | Opposition Result | Opposition Result | Opposition Result | Opposition Result | Opposition Result | Rank |
|---|---|---|---|---|---|---|---|
| Ricardo Valderrama | –66 kg | Bye | | Cargnin (BRA); L 10S2–00 | —N/a | Postigos (PER); W 10S1-00S2 | 3rd place, bronze medalist(s) |
| Sergio Mattey | –73 kg | Bye | Santos (BRA); W 01–00 | Estrada (CUB); L 00–10 | —N/a | Delpopolo (USA); L 00–01 | 4 |
| Noel Peña | –81 kg | Bye | Hatton (USA); L 00-10 | Did not advance | Vega (ARG); W 10-01 | Martínez (CUB); L 01-11 | 5 |
| Anthony Peña | –90 kg | Ortega (PAN); W 10-00 | Silva (CUB); L 00-10 | Did not advance | Elnahas (CAN); L 00H-10 | Did not advance | 7 |
| Pedro Pineda | +100 kg | Bye | Campos (ARG); W 10-00 | Figueroa (ECU); W 10-00 | —N/a | Granda (CUB); L 00-10 | 2nd place, silver medalist(s) |

Women

| Athlete | Event | Round of 16 | Quarterfinal | Semifinal | Repechage | Final / BM | |
| Athlete | Event | Opposition Result | Opposition Result | Opposition Result | Opposition Result | Opposition Result | Rank |
|---|---|---|---|---|---|---|---|
| Anriquelis Barrios | –63 kg | Bye | de Lucía (ARG); W 01-00 | Castilhos (BRA); W 10-00 | —N/a | del Toro (CUB); L 00-01 | 2nd place, silver medalist(s) |
| Elvismar Rodríguez | –70 kg | Bye | Santana (BRA); W 01-00 | Pérez (PUR); W 10S1-00S3 | —N/a | Alvear (COL); W 10-00 | 1st place, gold medalist(s) |
| Karen León | –78 kg | Bye | Cárdenas (MEX); W 10-00 | Aguiar (BRA); L 00-10 | —N/a | Brenes (CRC); L 10-00 | 5 |

== Karate ==
Venezuela qualified a team of ten karatekas (five men and five women).

Kumite (sparring)

| Athlete | Event | Round robin | | | | Semifinal | Final | |
| Athlete | Event | Opposition Result | Opposition Result | Opposition Result | Rank | Opposition Result | Opposition Result | Rank |
|---|---|---|---|---|---|---|---|---|
| Jovanni Martinez | Men's –60 kg | Escalante (PER); W 5-2 | González (CHI); W 5-3 | Estrada (MEX); W 3-1 | 1 Q | Brose (BRA); L 8-4 | Did not advance | 3rd place, bronze medalist(s) |
| Andrés Madera | Men's –67 kg | Veloso (CHI); W 5-4 | Avila (PER); W KIK | Noriega (CUB); W 5-1 | 1 Q | Ferreras (DOM); W 1-1 | Veloso (CHI) | 1st place, gold medalist(s) |
| Jhosed Ortuño | Men's –75 kg | Maldonado (GUA); D 0-0 | Soriano (DOM); L 3-6 | Charpentier (CHI); W 2-0 | 4 | Did not advance | | |
| Freddy Valera | Men's –84 kg | Mendoza (PER); W 3–0 | Sinisterra (COL); D 0-0 | Espinoza (ECU); W 1-0 | 2 Q | Madani (USA); L 0-1 | Did not advance | 3rd place, bronze medalist(s) |
| Genesis Navarrete | Women's –55 kg | Torres (CUB); L 1-3 | Campbell (CAN); L 6-7 | Vindrola (PER); W 3–1 | 3 | Did not advance | | |
| Claudymar Garcés | Women's –61 kg | dos Santos (BRA); D 0–0 | Factos (ECU); W 4-3 | Grande (PER); L 0-8 | 2 Q | Díaz (DOM); W 5-0 | Grande (PER); L 1-6 | 2nd place, silver medalist(s) |
| Marianth Cuervo | Women's –68 kg | Mosquera (COL); W 5-1 | Sepe (BRA); W 6-1 | Murphy (USA); W 3-0 | 1 Q | Li (CHI); L 2-2 | Did not advance | 3rd place, bronze medalist(s) |
| Omaira Molina | Women's +68 kg | Lingl (USA); W 5-2 | Castro (ARG); W 3-0 | —N/a | 1 Q | Aco (PER); W 5-2 | Rodríguez (DOM); L 2-6 | 2nd place, silver medalist(s) |

Kata (forms)

| Athlete | Event | Pool round 1 | | Pool round 2 | | Final / BM | |
| Athlete | Event | Score | Rank | Score | Rank | Opposition Result | Rank |
|---|---|---|---|---|---|---|---|
| Antonio Díaz | Men's individual | 24.32 | 1 Q | 25.14 | 1 Q | Torres (USA); W 25.82-25.46 | 1st place, gold medalist(s) |
| Andrea Armada | Women's individual | 23.48 | 2 Q | 24.20 | 2 Q | Ngo (CAN); W 24.74-24.00 | 3rd place, bronze medalist(s) |

== Modern pentathlon ==
Venezuela qualified two male modern pentathletes.

Men

| Athlete | Event | Fencing (Épée one touch) | | | | Swimming (200 m freestyle) | | | Riding (Show jumping) | | | Shooting / Running (10 m laser pistol / 3000 m cross-country) | | | Total | |
| Athlete | Event | V – D | Rank | MP points | BP | Time | Rank | MP points | Penalties | Rank | MP points | Time | Rank | MP points | MP points | Rank |
|---|---|---|---|---|---|---|---|---|---|---|---|---|---|---|---|---|
| Berengerth Sequera | Men's individual | 19-12 | 12 | 229 | | 2:08.58 | 10 | 293 | EL | | 0 | DNS | | 0 | 524 | 32 |
| Engelberth Sequera | Men's individual | 15-16 | 19 | 201 | 1 | 2:15.68 | 21 | 279 | | 21 | 224 | 12:36.00 | 25 | 544 | 1249 | 16 |
| Berengerth Sequera; Engelberth Sequera | Men's relay | 15-11 | 6 | 226 | | 1:56.13 | 5 | 318 | | 7 | 244 | 11:24.00 | 7 | 616 | 1404 | 7 |

== Racquetball ==
Venezuela qualified one female racquetball athlete.

Women

| Athlete | Event | Preliminary round | | | | Round of 16 | Quarterfinal | Semifinal | Final | |
| Athlete | Event | Opposition Result | Opposition Result | Opposition Result | Rank | Opposition Result | Opposition Result | Opposition Result | Opposition Result | Rank |
|---|---|---|---|---|---|---|---|---|---|---|
| Liliana Zea | Women's singles | Riveros (COL); L 0–2 | Mendez (ARG); L 0–2 | —N/a | 3 | Did not advance | | | | |

== Roller sports ==
=== Speed ===
| Athlete | Event | Preliminary | | Semifinal | | Final | |
| Athlete | Event | Time | Rank | Time | Rank | Time | Rank |
|---|---|---|---|---|---|---|---|
| Jhoan Guzmán | Men's 300 m time trial | —N/a | | | | 24.720 | 2nd place, silver medalist(s) |
| Jhoan Guzmán | Men's 500 m | 44.082 | 1 Q | 44.717 | 1 Q | 43.739 | 3rd place, bronze medalist(s) |
| Golckner Ropero | Men's 10,000 m endurance | —N/a | | | | EL 19 | 10 |
| Yarubi Bandres | Women's 300 m time trial | —N/a | | | | 30.046 | 10 |
| Yarubi Bandres | Women's 500 m | 47.499 | 2 Q | 47.435 | 1 Q | 47.636 | 4 |
| Angy Quintero | Women's 10,000 m endurance | —N/a | | | | EL 34 | 7 |

== Rowing ==
Venezuela qualified 2 boats, for a total of 3 rowers, at the 2018 Pan American Qualification Regatta.

Men

| Athlete | Event | Heat | | Repechage | | Semifinal | | Final B | |
| Athlete | Event | Time | Rank | Time | Rank | Time | Rank | Time | Rank |
|---|---|---|---|---|---|---|---|---|---|
| Jaime Machado | Single sculls | 7:43.70 | 4 R | 7:39.58 | 3 SF | 7:39.02 | 5 FB | 7:26.52 | 12 |
| José Güipe; Jackson Vicent | Double sculls | 6:51.09 | 4 R | 6:59.10 | 5 FB | —N/a | | 6:52.98 | 10 |

== Sailing ==
Venezuela has qualified 5 boats for a total of 6 sailors.

Men

| Athlete | Event | Race | | | | | | | | | | | | | Total | |
| Athlete | Event | 1 | 2 | 3 | 4 | 5 | 6 | 7 | 8 | 9 | 10 | 11 | 12 | M | Points | Rank |
|---|---|---|---|---|---|---|---|---|---|---|---|---|---|---|---|---|
| Daniel Flores | RS:X | 6 | 5 | 8 | 8 | 8 | 5 | 6 | 6 | 8 | 8 | 5 | 4 | Did not advance | 69 | 7 |
| José Gutiérrez | Laser | 4 | 15 | 11 | 18 | 14 | 10 | 15 | 15 | 15 | 14 | —N/a | | Did not advance | 113 | 14 |

Women

| Athlete | Event | Race | | | | | | | | | | | | | Total | |
| Athlete | Event | 1 | 2 | 3 | 4 | 5 | 6 | 7 | 8 | 9 | 10 | 11 | 12 | M | Points | Rank |
|---|---|---|---|---|---|---|---|---|---|---|---|---|---|---|---|---|
| Dismary Bonillo | RS:X | 6 | 8 | 7 | OCS | 8 | 6 | 8 | 7 | 8 | 7 | DNF | 6 | Did not advance | 80 | 8 |
| Daniela Rivera | Laser radial | 11 | 11 | 15 | 11 | 9 | 11 | 4 | 9 | 10 | 5 | —N/a | | Did not advance | 78 | 10 |

Mixed

| Athlete | Event | Race | | | | | | | | | | | | | Total | |
| Athlete | Event | 1 | 2 | 3 | 4 | 5 | 6 | 7 | 8 | 9 | 10 | 11 | 12 | M | Points | Rank |
|---|---|---|---|---|---|---|---|---|---|---|---|---|---|---|---|---|
| Andrea Saba; Yamil Saba | Nacra 17 | DNS | | | | | | | | | | | | Did not advance | 132 | 11 |

== Shooting ==
Venezuela qualified 5 athletes through the 2018 Shooting Championships of the Americas.

Men

| Athlete | Event | Qualification | | Final | |
| Athlete | Event | Points | Rank | Points | Rank |
|---|---|---|---|---|---|
| Edilio Centeno | 10 m air pistol | 557 | 23 | Did not advance | |
| Felipe Beuvrín | 10 m air pistol | DNS | | Did not advance | |
| Felipe Beuvrín | 25 m rapid fire pistol | DNS | | Did not advance | |
| Douglas Gómez | 25 m rapid fire pistol | 586 | 7 | Did not advance | |
| Julio Iemma | 10 m air rifle | 616.6 | 12 | Did not advance | |
| Julio Iemma | 50 m rifle three position | 1168 | 2 Q | 394.0 | 7 |
| Leonel Martínez | Trap | 113 | 15 | Did not advance | |

== Softball ==
Venezuela qualified a women's team (of 15 athletes) by being ranked in the top five nations at the 2017 Women's Pan American Championships. The men's team (also consisting of 15 athletes) qualified later by winning the 2017 Men's Pan American Championships.

Summary

| Team | Event | Round robin | | | | | | Semifinal | Bronze medal final | Final | |
| Team | Event | Opposition Result | Opposition Result | Opposition Result | Opposition Result | Opposition Result | Rank | Opposition Result | Opposition Result | Opposition Result | Rank |
|---|---|---|---|---|---|---|---|---|---|---|---|
| Venezuela men | Men's tournament | United States; L 3–8 | Argentina; L 0–1 | Peru; W 3–0 | Mexico; L 1–5 | Cuba; L 0–3 | 5 | Did not advance | | | 5 |
| Venezuela women | Women's tournament | Peru; W 5–3 | Canada; L 0–8 | Mexico; L 3–11 | United States; L 0–9 | Puerto Rico; L 1–10 | 5 | Did not advance | | | 5 |

=== Men's tournament ===
Preliminary round

| Team | Pld | W | L | RF | RA | RD | Qualification |
|---|---|---|---|---|---|---|---|
| Argentina | 5 | 5 | 0 | 29 | 4 | +25 | Qualified for the semifinals |
| United States | 5 | 4 | 1 | 38 | 10 | +28 | Qualified for the semifinals |
| Cuba | 5 | 3 | 2 | 33 | 22 | +11 | Qualified for the semifinals |
| Mexico | 5 | 2 | 3 | 31 | 23 | +8 | Qualified for the semifinals |
| Venezuela | 5 | 1 | 4 | 7 | 17 | −10 | |
| Peru | 5 | 0 | 5 | 0 | 62 | −62 | |

| 25 July 2019; 13:00 | Venezuela | 3–8 | United States | Softball Field, Villa María del Triunfo; Attendance: 0 |
| 25 July 2019; 13:00 | | Boxscore | | Softball Field, Villa María del Triunfo; Attendance: 0 |

| 27 July 2019; 10:00 | Argentina | 1–0 (F/8) | Venezuela | Softball Field, Villa María del Triunfo; Attendance: 612 |
| 27 July 2019; 10:00 | | Boxscore | | Softball Field, Villa María del Triunfo; Attendance: 612 |

| 28 July 2019; 16:00 | Peru | 0–3 | Venezuela | Softball Field, Villa María del Triunfo; Attendance: 914 |
| 28 July 2019; 16:00 | | Boxscore | | Softball Field, Villa María del Triunfo; Attendance: 914 |

| 29 July 2019; 13:00 | Venezuela | 1–5 | Mexico | Softball Field, Villa María del Triunfo |
| 29 July 2019; 13:00 | | Boxscore | | Softball Field, Villa María del Triunfo |

| 30 July 2019; 10:00 | Venezuela | 0–3 | Cuba | Softball Field, Villa María del Triunfo |
| 30 July 2019; 10:00 | | Boxscore | | Softball Field, Villa María del Triunfo |

=== Women's tournament ===
Preliminary round

| Team | Pld | W | L | RF | RA | RD | Qualification |
|---|---|---|---|---|---|---|---|
| United States | 5 | 5 | 0 | 37 | 1 | +36 | Qualified for the semifinals |
| Canada | 5 | 4 | 1 | 23 | 7 | +16 | Qualified for the semifinals |
| Puerto Rico | 5 | 3 | 2 | 18 | 12 | +6 | Qualified for the semifinals |
| Mexico | 5 | 2 | 3 | 20 | 17 | +3 | Qualified for the semifinals |
| Venezuela | 5 | 1 | 4 | 9 | 41 | −32 | |
| Peru | 5 | 0 | 5 | 5 | 34 | −29 | |

| 4 August 2019; 16:00 | Venezuela | 5–3 | Peru | Campo de Softbol, Lima; Attendance: 1 160 |
| 4 August 2019; 16:00 | | Boxscore | | Campo de Softbol, Lima; Attendance: 1 160 |

| 5 August 2019; 13:00 | Canada | 8–0 | Venezuela | Campo de Softbol, Lima; Attendance: 0 |
| 5 August 2019; 13:00 | | Boxscore | | Campo de Softbol, Lima; Attendance: 0 |

| 6 August 2019; 13:00 | Venezuela | 3–11 | Mexico | Campo de Softbol, Lima; Attendance: 32O |
| 6 August 2019; 13:00 | | Boxscore | | Campo de Softbol, Lima; Attendance: 32O |

| 7 August 2019; 10:00 | United States | 9–0 | Venezuela | Campo de Softbol, Lima; Attendance: 280 |
| 7 August 2019; 10:00 | | Boxscore | | Campo de Softbol, Lima; Attendance: 280 |

| 8 August 2019; 10:00 | Puerto Rico | 10–1 | Venezuela | Campo de Softbol, Lima; Attendance: 0 |
| 8 August 2019; 10:00 | | Boxscore | | Campo de Softbol, Lima; Attendance: 0 |

== Surfing ==
Venezuela qualified six surfers (three men and three women) in the sport's debut at the Pan American Games.

Artistic

| Athlete | Event | Round 1 | Round 2 | Round 3 | Round 4 | Repechage 1 | Repechage 2 | Repechage 3 | Repechage 4 | Repechage 5 | Bronze medal | Final | |
| Athlete | Event | Opposition Result | Opposition Result | Opposition Result | Opposition Result | Opposition Result | Opposition Result | Opposition Result | Opposition Result | Opposition Result | Opposition Result | Opposition Result | Rank |
|---|---|---|---|---|---|---|---|---|---|---|---|---|---|
| Francisco Bellorín | Men's open | Satt (CHI); W 11.97–9.04 | Fillingim (CRC); L 7.17-7.67 | Did not advance | | —N/a | Satt (CHI); W 12.67–5.66 | Muñiz (ARG); L 11.10-12.17 | Did not advance | | | | 7 |
| Armando Colucci | Men's SUP surf | Gómez (COL), de Cabo (ARG); L 3.44 | Did not advance | | | Diniz (BRA), de Armas (PUR); L 6.84 | Did not advance | | | | | | 9 |
| Rosanny Álavarez | Women's open | Induraín (ARG); L 9-06-13.00 | Did not advance | | | Berrezueta (ECU); W 7.37-5.80 | Induraín (ARG); L 9.27-11.40 | Did not advance | | | | | 9 |
| Mariana Bermúdez | Women's longboard | Thompson (USA), Calmon (BRA); L 0.50 | Did not advance | | | Fernández (CHI), Machuca (MEX); L 3.27 | Did not advance | | | | | | 9 |

Race

| Athlete | Event | Time | Rank |
|---|---|---|---|
| Francisco Hernández | Men's SUP race | 42:38.0 | 9 |
| Edimar Luque | Women's SUP race | 39:02.4 | 8 |

== Swimming ==
Venezuela will send 21 athletes to the 2019 Pan American Games, the Technical Committee of the American Swimming Union (UANA) completed the selection of athletes for swimming events at the Pan American Games Lima 2019.

Venezuelan swimmers have so far achieved qualifying for Open water swimming obtain the first eight places (per gender) in the qualification competition in Campeonato Sudamericano de Deportes Acuáticos 2018.

Men

| Athlete | Event | Heat | | Final | |
| Athlete | Event | Time | Rank | Time | Rank |
|---|---|---|---|---|---|
| Alberto Mestre | 50 m freestyle | 22.52 | 7 Q | 22.40 | 7 |
| Alberto Mestre | 100 m freestyle | 49.74 | 10 FB | 50.08 | 11 |
| Christian Quintero | 100 m freestyle | 49.15 | 4 Q | 48.94 | 4 |
| Rafael Dávila | 200 m freestyle | 1:50.39 | 8 Q | 1:50.12 | 8 |
| Rafael Dávila | 400 m freestyle | 3:55.58 | 8 Q | 3:52.27 | 5 |
| Rafael Dávila | 800 m freestyle | —N/a | | 8:05.43 | 7 |
| Rafael Dávila | 1500 m freestyle | —N/a | | 15:32.66 | 7 |
| Andy Arteta | 800 m freestyle | —N/a | | 8:29.42 | 12 |
| Andy Arteta | 1500 m freestyle | —N/a | | 16:01.13 | 11 |
| Andy Arteta | 200 m butterfly | 2:07.02 | 18 | Did not advance | |
| Robinson Molina | 100 m backstroke | DNS | | | |
| Jesús López | 100 m backstroke | 58.32 | 15 FB | 58.11 | 13 |
| Jesús López | 200 m backstroke | 2:09.51 | 20 | Did not advance | |
| Carlos Claverie | 100 m breaststroke | 1:02.67 | 13 FB | 1:02.98 | 15 |
| Carlos Claverie | 200 m breaststroke | 2:13.64 | 5 Q | 2:13.19 | 6 |
| Carlos Claverie | 200 m individual medley | 2:06.43 | 13 | Did not advance | |
| Marco Guarente | 100 m breaststroke | 1:02.38 | 12 FB | 1:01.59 | 9 |
| Marco Guarente | 200 m breaststroke | 2:13.64 | 6 Q | 2:14.40 | 7 |
| Bryan Chávez | 100 m butterfly | 54.85 | 14 FB | 54.82 | 12 |
| Juan Sequera | 200 m individual medley | DNS | | | |
| Alberto Mestre; Christian Quintero; Bryan Chávez; Jesús López | 4 × 100 m freestyle relay | —N/a | | 3:18.79 | 4 |
| Christian Quintero; Antoine Khazne; Andy Arteta; Rafael Dávila | 4 × 200 m freestyle relay | —N/a | | 7:27.42 | 4 |
| Jesús López; Marco Guarente; Bryan Chávez; Christian Quintero | 4 × 100 m medley relay | 3:46.48 | 7 Q | 3:43.96 | 7 |
| Diego Vera | 10 km open water | —N/a | | 1:54:36.0 | 8 |

Women

| Athlete | Event | Heat | | Final | |
| Athlete | Event | Time | Rank | Time | Rank |
|---|---|---|---|---|---|
| Jeserik Pinto | 50 m freestyle | 26.12 | 10 FB | 26.08 | 9 |
| Jeserik Pinto | 100 m freestyle | 57.57 | 12 | Did not advance | |
| Jeserik Pinto | 100 m butterfly | 1:00.87 | 8 Q | 1:00.64 | 7 |
| Andrea Garrido | 200 m freestyle | 2:08.04 | 16 FB | 2:06.14 | 11 |
| Mariangella Cinconti | 1500 m freestyle | —N/a | | 18:12.51 | 12 |
| Carla González | 100 m backstroke | 1:05.62 | 18 | Did not advance | |
| Maryeli Escalante | 200 m backstroke | 2:24.86 | 20 | Did not advance | |
| Maryeli Escalante | 400 m medley | 5:20.57 | 14 FB | 5:19.79 | 13 |
| Mercedes Toledo | 100 m breaststroke | 1:09.74 | 7 Q | 1:10.20 | 8 |
| Mercedes Toledo | 200 m breaststroke | 2:34.29 | 12 FB | 2:334.37 | 13 |
| Isabella Páez | 100 m butterfly | 1:01.44 | 12 FB | 1:01.85 | 12 |
| Isabella Páez | 200 m butterfly | 2:14.10 | 8 Q | 2:15.53 | 8 |
| Andrea Santander | 200 m medley | 2:28.11 | 20 | Did not advance | |
| Andrea Santander; Fabiana Pesce; Carla González; Jeserik Pinto | 4 × 100 m freestyle relay | —N/a | | 3:53.89 | 4 |
| Andrea Garrido; Mariangela Cincotti; Andrea Santander; Simone Palomo | 4 × 200 m freestyle relay | —N/a | | 8:33.91 | 8 |
| Carla González; Mercedes Toledo; Isabella Páez; Jeserik Pinto; Fabiana Pesce* | 4 × 100 m medley relay | 4:19.12 | 7 Q | 4:13.98 | 6 |
| Paola Pérez | 10 km open water | —N/a | | 2:05:27.3 | 11 |

Mixed

| Athlete | Event | Heat | | Final | |
| Athlete | Event | Time | Rank | Time | Rank |
|---|---|---|---|---|---|
| Christian Quintero; Alberto Mestre; Jeserik Pinto; Andrea Santander; Antoine Khazne*; Andy Arteta*; Fabiana Pesce*; Simone Palomo* | 4 × 100 m freestyle relay | 3:43.63 | 8 Q | 3:34.22 | 4 |
| Carla González; Marco Guarente; Isabella Páez; Christian Quintero; Mayerly Escalante*; Bryan Chávez*; Fabiana Pesce* | 4 × 100 m medley relay | 4:03.18 | 8 Q | 3:58.10 | 6 |

Legend: (*) = Swimmers who participated in the heat only.

== Table tennis ==
Men

| Athlete | Event | Round of 16 | Quarterfinal | Semifinal | Final / BM | |
| Athlete | Event | Opposition Result | Opposition Result | Opposition Result | Opposition Result | Rank |
|---|---|---|---|---|---|---|
| Cecilio Correa | Singles | Madrid (MEX); L 2-4 | Did not advance | | | |
| Marco Navas | Singles | Miño (ECU); L 0-4 | Did not advance | | | |
| Cecilio Correa; Marco Navas | Doubles | Afanador– González (PUR); L 1-4 | Did not advance | | | |

Women

| Athlete | Event | Round of 16 | Quarterfinal | Semifinal | Final / BM | |
| Athlete | Event | Opposition Result | Opposition Result | Opposition Result | Opposition Result | Rank |
|---|---|---|---|---|---|---|
| Neridee Niño | Singles | Côté (CAN); W 4-2 | Díaz (PUR); L 0-4 | Did not advance | | |

Mixed

| Athlete | Event | Round of 16 | Quarterfinal | Semifinal | Final / BM | |
| Athlete | Event | Opposition Result | Opposition Result | Opposition Result | Opposition Result | Rank |
|---|---|---|---|---|---|---|
| Marco Navas; Neridee Niño | Doubles | Tsuboi– Takahashi (BRA); L 2-4 | Did not advance | | | |

== Taekwondo ==
Kyorugi (sparring)

Men

| Athlete | Event | Preliminary round | Quarterfinal | Semifinal | Repechage | Final / BM | |
| Athlete | Event | Opposition Result | Opposition Result | Opposition Result | Opposition Result | Opposition Result | Rank |
|---|---|---|---|---|---|---|---|
| Yohandri Granado | –58 kg | Pie (DOM); W 9-7 | Oblitas (PER); W 27-7 | Plaza (MEX); L 28-39 | —N/a | Kim (USA); L 8-10 | 5 |
| Carlos Rivas | –80 kg | Barbosa (PUR); L 8-14 | Did not advance | | —N/a | Did not advance | |
| Luis Álvarez | +80 kg | Sansores (MEX); L 8-12 | Did not advance | | —N/a | Did not advance | |

Women

| Athlete | Event | Preliminary round | Semifinal | Quarterfinal | Repechage | Final / BM | |
| Athlete | Event | Opposition Result | Opposition Result | Opposition Result | Opposition Result | Opposition Result | Rank |
|---|---|---|---|---|---|---|---|
| Virginia Dellan | –49 kg | Rodriguez (USA); L 7-8 | Did not advance | | —N/a | Did not advance | |
| Adriana Martínez | –57 kg | Villegas (MEX); L 2-13 | Did not advance | | —N/a | Did not advance | |
| Adanys Cordero | –67 kg | Dumar (COL); L 0-8 | Did not advance | | —N/a | Did not advance | |
| Carolina Fernández | +67 kg | Avila (HON); W 9-9 | Acosta (MEX); L 3-7 | Did not advance | —N/a | Fidelis (BRA); L 0-7 | 5 |

== Triathlon ==
Venezuela qualified an athlete.

Women

| Athlete | Event | Swimming (1.5 km) | Transition 1 | Biking (40 km) | Transition 2 | Running (10 km) | Total | Rank |
|---|---|---|---|---|---|---|---|---|
| Génesis Ruiz | Women's | 19:56 | 0:51 | 1:13:26 | 0:33 | 43:36 | 2:18:21 | 23 |

== Volleyball ==
=== Beach ===
Venezuela qualified a men's pair.

Men

| Athlete | Event | Group stage | | | | Round of 16 | Quarterfinal | Placement 5th–8th | | Rank |
| Athlete | Event | Opposition Result | Opposition Result | Opposition Result | Rank | Opposition Result | Opposition Result | Opposition Result | Opposition Result | Rank |
|---|---|---|---|---|---|---|---|---|---|---|
| Rolando Hernández; José Gómez | Men's | Leonardo – García (GUA); W 2–0 (21–18, 21–19) | Vásquez – Seminario (PER); W 2–0 (21–8, 21–8) | Medina – Sánchez (DOM); W 2–0 (21–14, 21–16) | 1 Q | Bye | Nusbaum – Plantinga (CAN); L1–2 (26–28, 24–22, 7–15) | Reyes – González (CUB); L1–2 (14–21, 26–24, 12–15) | Brandão – Dealtry (BRA); L0–2 (17–21, 11–21) | 8 |

== Water polo ==
Venezuela women's water polo team qualified for the Games, after reaching the final in the Women's tournament at the 2018 CONSANAT South American Championships in Trujillo, Peru.

Summary

Key:

- FT – After full time.
- P – Match decided by penalty-shootout.

Summary

| Team | Event | Group stage | | | | Quarterfinal | Qualification 5-8 | Final / BM / Pl. | |
| Team | Event | Opposition Result | Opposition Result | Opposition Result | Rank | Opposition Result | Opposition Result | Opposition Result | Rank |
|---|---|---|---|---|---|---|---|---|---|
| Venezuela | Women's tournament | Brazil; L 4-15 | Puerto Rico; L 5-9 | United States; L 2-23 | 4 Q | Canada; L 3-22 | Mexico; L 6-13 | Peru; W 14-7 | 7 |

=== Women's tournament ===
Preliminary round

| Pos | Team | Pld | W | D | L | GF | GA | GD | Pts | Qualification |
|---|---|---|---|---|---|---|---|---|---|---|
| 1 | United States | 3 | 3 | 0 | 0 | 66 | 10 | +56 | 6 | Quarterfinals |
| 2 | Brazil | 3 | 2 | 0 | 1 | 31 | 32 | −1 | 4 | Quarterfinals |
| 3 | Puerto Rico | 3 | 1 | 0 | 2 | 20 | 40 | −20 | 2 | Quarterfinals |
| 4 | Venezuela | 3 | 0 | 0 | 3 | 12 | 47 | −35 | 0 | Quarterfinals |

Source: Lima 2019
Rules for classification: 1) points; 2) head-to-head points; 3) head-to-head goal difference; 4) head-to-head number of goals scored; 5) goal difference.

| 4 August 2019; 8:00 | Report | Brazil | 15–4 | Venezuela | Villa María del Triunfo Aquatic Centre, Lima; Referees: Juan Menéndez (CUB); Gerardo Arellano (MEX) |
| 4 August 2019; 8:00 | Report | Score by quarters: 2-1, 4-2, 5-0, 4-1 | | | Villa María del Triunfo Aquatic Centre, Lima; Referees: Juan Menéndez (CUB); Gerardo Arellano (MEX) |
| 4 August 2019; 8:00 | Report | Bahia 6 | Goals | Torres 3 | Villa María del Triunfo Aquatic Centre, Lima; Referees: Juan Menéndez (CUB); Gerardo Arellano (MEX) |

| 5 August 2019; 8:00 | Report | Puerto Rico | 9–5 | Venezuela | Villa María del Triunfo Aquatic Centre, Lima; Referees: Marie-Claude Deslieres (CAN); Yasmany Lima (CUB) |
| 5 August 2019; 8:00 | Report | Score by quarters: 2-1, 2-1, 4-2, 1-1 | | | Villa María del Triunfo Aquatic Centre, Lima; Referees: Marie-Claude Deslieres (CAN); Yasmany Lima (CUB) |
| 5 August 2019; 8:00 | Report | Maldonado 3 | Goals | Martínez 3 | Villa María del Triunfo Aquatic Centre, Lima; Referees: Marie-Claude Deslieres (CAN); Yasmany Lima (CUB) |

| 6 August 2019; 11:00 | Report | Venezuela | 3–23 | United States | Villa María del Triunfo Aquatic Centre, Lima; Referees: Nestor Torres (PER); Doriel Terpenka (CAN) |
| 6 August 2019; 11:00 | Report | Score by quarters: 0-11, 0-5, 1-4, 2-3 | | | Villa María del Triunfo Aquatic Centre, Lima; Referees: Nestor Torres (PER); Doriel Terpenka (CAN) |
| 6 August 2019; 11:00 | Report | Torres 2 | Goals | four players 3 | Villa María del Triunfo Aquatic Centre, Lima; Referees: Nestor Torres (PER); Doriel Terpenka (CAN) |

Quarterfinal

| 8 August 2019; 12:30 | Report | Venezuela | 3–22 | Canada | VMT Aquatic Centre, Lima; Referees: Diego Hernán Garibaldi (ARG); José Angel Ortiz Irizarry (PUR) |
| 8 August 2019; 12:30 | Report | Score by quarters: 0–8, 2–4, 0–6, 1–4 | | | VMT Aquatic Centre, Lima; Referees: Diego Hernán Garibaldi (ARG); José Angel Ortiz Irizarry (PUR) |

5th–8th place semifinals

| 9 August 2019; 08:00 | Report | Mexico | 13–6 | Venezuela | VMT Aquatic Centre, Lima; Referees: Diego Garibaldi (ARG); Juan Menéndez (CUB) |
| 9 August 2019; 08:00 | Report | Score by quarters: 5–1, 1–3, 4–0, 3–2 | | | VMT Aquatic Centre, Lima; Referees: Diego Garibaldi (ARG); Juan Menéndez (CUB) |

Seventh place match

| 10 August 2019; 08:00 | Report | Venezuela | 14–7 | Peru | VMT Aquatic Centre, Lima; Referees: Gerardo de Jesús Arellano Báez (MEX); Marcus Paulo Gresele (BRA) |
| 10 August 2019; 08:00 | Report | Score by quarters: 3–3, 2–1, 5–1, 4–2 | | | VMT Aquatic Centre, Lima; Referees: Gerardo de Jesús Arellano Báez (MEX); Marcus Paulo Gresele (BRA) |

== Weightlifting ==
Venezuela qualified ten weightlifters (six men and four women).

Men

| Athlete | Event | Snatch | | Clean & jerk | | Total | |
| Athlete | Event | Weight | Rank | Weight | Rank | Weight | Rank |
|---|---|---|---|---|---|---|---|
| Kervis Escalona | –67 kg | 130 | 4 | 160 | 4 | 290 | 4 |
| Julio Mayora | –73 kg | 155 | 1 | 194 | 1 | 349 | 1st place, gold medalist(s) |
| Angel Luna | –96 kg | 162 | 6 | 202 | 5 | 364 | 6 |
| Keydomar Vallenilla | –96 kg | 169 | 4 | 205 | 4 | 374 | 3rd place, bronze medalist(s) |
| Jeyson Arias | –109 kg | 166 | 5 | 202 | 4 | 368 | 5 |
| Jesús González | –109 kg | 178 | 2 | 210 | 2 | 388 | 2nd place, silver medalist(s) |

Women

| Athlete | Event | Snatch | | Clearn & jerk | | Total | |
| Athlete | Event | Weight | Rank | Weight | Rank | Weight | Rank |
|---|---|---|---|---|---|---|---|
| Génesis Rodríguez | –55 kg | 96 | 1 | 116 | 1 | 212 | 1st place, gold medalist(s) |
| Anyelin Venegas | –59 kg | 89 | 9 | 119 | 4 | 208 | 5 |
| Yusleidy Figueroa | –59 kg | 93 | 5 | 122 | 3 | 215 | 3rd place, bronze medalist(s) |
| Naryuri Pérez | –87 kg | 112 | 3 | 140 | 4 | 252 | 4 |

== Wrestling ==
Men's freestyle

| Athlete | Event | Quarterfinals | Semifinals | Final / BM | |
| Athlete | Event | Opposition Result | Opposition Result | Opposition Result | Rank |
|---|---|---|---|---|---|
| Pedro Mejías | 57 kg | Andreu (CUB); L 0-4 | Did not advance | | 7 |
| Wilfredo Rodríguez | 65 kg | Destribats (ARG); L 10-17 | Did not advance | | 7 |
| Pedro Ceballos | 86 kg | Anguiano (MEX); W 11-0 | Izquierdo (COL); W 10-0 | Torreblanca (CUB); L 3-4 | 2nd place, silver medalist(s) |
| José Díaz | 97 kg | Steen (CAN); W 3-0 | Pérez (DOM); W 8-1 | Snyder (USA); L 3-9 | 2nd place, silver medalist(s) |
| Luis Vivenes | 125 kg | Pino (CUB); L 2-6 | —N/a | Braga (BRA); W 11-0 | 3rd place, bronze medalist(s) |

Key: VT=Victory by fall; VF=Victory by forfeit; ST=Victory by great superiority; SP=Victory by technical superiority; PP=Victory by points, loser with technical points; PO=Victory by points, loser without technical points

Men's Greco-Roman

| Athlete | Event | Round of 16 | Quarterfinals | Semifinals | Final / BM | |
| Athlete | Event | Opposition Result | Opposition Result | Opposition Result | Opposition Result | Rank |
|---|---|---|---|---|---|---|
| Anthony Palencia | 60 kg | —N/a | Benavides (PER); W 11-3 | Montaño (ECU); L 0-8 | Orta (CUB); L 0-8 | 5 |
| Shalom Villegas | 67 kg | —N/a | López (MEX); W 4-1 | Soto (PER); W 8-0 | Borrero (CUB); L 0-12 | 2nd place, silver medalist(s) |
| Wuileixis Rivas | 77 kg | —N/a | Marques (BRA); W 9-0 | Peña (CUB); W 5-2 | Smith (USA); L 2-3 | 2nd place, silver medalist(s) |
| Luis Avendaño | 87 kg | —N/a | Rau (USA); W 8-0 | Gregorich (CUB); W 4-0 | Leyva (MEX); W 5-3 | 1st place, gold medalist(s) |
| Luillys Pérez | 97 kg | —N/a | Rosillo (CUB); L 0-9 | Did not advance | Arias (DOM); W 9-0 | 3rd place, bronze medalist(s) |
| Moises Pérez | 130 kg | —N/a | López (PUR); W 6-1 | Santana (DOM); W 7-0 | López (CUB); L 0-9 | 2nd place, silver medalist(s) |

Key: VT=Victory by fall; VF=Victory by forfeit; ST=Victory by great superiority; SP=Victory by technical superiority; PP=Victory by points, loser with technical points; PO=Victory by points, loser without technical points

Women's freestyle

| Athlete | Event | Quarterfinals | Semifinals | Final / BM | |
| Athlete | Event | Opposition Result | Opposition Result | Opposition Result | Rank |
|---|---|---|---|---|---|
| Betzabeth Argüello | 53 kg | Benites (PER); W 4-0 | Montero (CUB); W 4-0 | Hildebrandt (USA); L 0-10 | 2nd place, silver medalist(s) |
| Nathali Griman | 62 kg | Estornell (CUB); W 8-4 | Miracle (USA); L 0-10 | Nunes (BRA); L 1-4 | 5 |
| María Acosta | 68 kg | Ayoví (ECU); W 8-0 | di Bacco (CAN); L 4-9 | Sánchez (CUB); L 3-5 | 5 |
| Andrimar Lázaro | 76 kg | di Stasio (CAN); L 0-10 | Did not advance | Olaya (COL); L 0-4 | 5 |

Key: VT=Victory by fall; VB=Victory by injury; ST=Victory by great superiority; SP=Victory by technical superiority; PP=Victory by points, loser with technical points; PO=Victory by points, loser without technical points
