= Santiago Grassi =

Argentine swimmer (born 1996)

Personal information
- Born: 25 September 1996 (age 30) Santa Fe, Argentina

Sport
- Sport: Swimming
- College team: Auburn Tigers
Medal record
Men's swimming
Representing Argentina
Pan American Games
Silver medal – second place	2015 Toronto	100 m butterfly
Bronze medal – third place	2019 Lima	4×100 m medley
Bronze medal – third place	2019 Lima	4×100 m mixed medley

Santiago Grassi (born 25 September 1996) is an Argentine swimmer. He competed at the 2016 Summer Olympics in the men's 100 metre butterfly; his time of 52.56 seconds in the heats did not qualify him for the semifinals. He represented Argentina again at the 2020 Summer Olympics in the men's 100 metre butterfly event.

== Career ==
He won the silver medal in the men's 100 metre butterfly event at the 2015 Pan American Games.
