= Long Gutiérrez =

Mexican-American swimmer (born 1995)

Medal record

Men's swimming

Representing Mexico

Pan American Games
Bronze medal – third place	2019 Lima	4×100 m freestyle
Bronze medal – third place	2019 Lima	4×200 m freestyle

Long Yuan Miguel Gutiérrez Feng (born February 23, 1995) is a Mexican-American swimmer. He competed for Mexico in the men's 100 metre butterfly event at the 2016 Summer Olympics; his time of 53.34 seconds in the heats did not qualify him for the semifinals.

Gutiérrez was born in Mexico and immigrated to Salt Lake City with his family when he was three years old. He competed for the California Golden Bears at the collegiate level. He was a member of Brighton High School swim team, and currently still holds the 5A state record in the 200-yard freestyle.

Long holds the Mexican national record in the men's 100 butterfly with a lifetime best time of 52.22. He was also a member of the Mexican Olympic team in Rio 2016.
