= Guido Buscaglia =

Argentine swimmer (born 1996)

Personal information
- Born: 8 October 1996 (age 29) Mar del Plata, Argentina

Sport
- Sport: Swimming
Medal record
Representing Argentina
Pan American Games
Bronze medal – third place	2019 Lima	4x100m medley relay
South American Games
Silver medal – second place	2014 Santiago	4x100m freestyle relay

Guido Alejandro Buscaglia (born 8 October 1996) is an Argentine swimmer. He competed in the men's 50 metre freestyle event at the 2018 FINA World Swimming Championships (25 m), in Hangzhou, China.
