= Jared Fitzgerald =

Bahamian swimmer (born 1998)

Personal information
- Full name: Jared Kennedy Fitzgerald
- Born: 16 August 1998 (age 27)

Sport
- Sport: Swimming

Jared Kennedy Fitzgerald (born 16 August 1998) is a Bahamian swimmer. In 2019, he represented the Bahamas at the 2019 World Aquatics Championships in Gwangju, South Korea. He competed in the men's 50 metre freestyle and men's 100 metre freestyle events.

In 2019, he competed in the men's 100 metre freestyle event at the 2019 Pan American Games held in Lima, Peru. He also competed in three relay events.
