= N'Nhyn Fernander =

Bahamian swimmer (born 1998)

Personal information
- Born: 28 July 1998 (age 27)

Sport
- Sport: Swimming

N'Nhyn Fernander (born 28 July 1998) is a Bahamian swimmer. He competed in the men's 50 metre breaststroke event at the 2017 World Aquatics Championships.
