= Paraguay at the 2025 World Aquatics Championships =

- Flag of Paraguay
- World Aquatics code: PAR
- National federation: Federación Paraguaya de Deportes Acuáticos

in Singapore
- Competitors: 4 in 2 sports
- Medals: Gold 0 Silver 0 Bronze 0 Total 0

World Aquatics Championships appearances
- 1973; 1975; 1978; 1982; 1986; 1991; 1994; 1998; 2001; 2003; 2005; 2007; 2009; 2011; 2013; 2015; 2017; 2019; 2022; 2023; 2024; 2025

Paraguay competed at the 2025 World Aquatics Championships in Singapore from July 11 to August 3, 2025.

== Competitors ==
The following is the list of competitors in the Championships.

Sport	Men	Women	Total
Open water swimming	1	1	2
Swimming	1	1	2
Total	2	2	4

== Open water swimming ==
Men

Athlete	Event	Heat		Semi-final		Final	
Athlete	Event	Time	Rank	Time	Rank	Time	Rank
Joaquín Estigarribia	Men's 3 km knockout sprints	20:24.0	29	Did not advance			
Joaquín Estigarribia	Men's 5 km	—				1:11:28.6	73
Joaquín Estigarribia	Men's 10 km	—				OTL	

Women

Athlete	Event	Heat		Semi-final		Final	
Athlete	Event	Time	Rank	Time	Rank	Time	Rank
Cielo Peralta	Women's 3 km knockout sprints	20:32.0	26	Did not advance			
Cielo Peralta	Women's 5 km	—				1:15:09.6	62
Cielo Peralta	Women's 10 km	—				2:31:46.5	50

== Swimming ==
Paraguay entered 2 swimmers.

Men

Athlete	Event	Heat		Semi-final		Final	
Athlete	Event	Time	Rank	Time	Rank	Time	Rank
Charles Hockin	50 m backstroke	26.11	51	Did not advance			
Charles Hockin	50 m butterfly	25.17	59	Did not advance			

Women

Athlete	Event	Heat		Semi-final		Final	
Athlete	Event	Time	Rank	Time	Rank	Time	Rank
Lara Giménez	50 m backstroke	31.01	48	Did not advance			
Lara Giménez	100 m backstroke	1:06.95	49	Did not advance			
