= List of Paraguayan records in swimming =

The Paraguayan records in swimming are the fastest ever performances of swimmers from Paraguay, which are recognised and ratified by the Federacion Paraguaya De Natacion (FEPANA).

All records were set in finals unless noted otherwise.

== Long course (50 m) ==
=== Men ===
Event	Time		Name	Club	Date	Meet	Location	Ref
50 m freestyle	22.97		Benjamin Hockin	Sajonia	16 December 2016	Paraguay Age Group Championships	Asunción, Paraguay	
100 m freestyle	49.33		Benjamin Hockin	Sajonia	23 May 2019	Grand Prix SyC	Asunción, Paraguay	
200 m freestyle	1:47.79		Benjamin Hockin	Sajonia	30 March 2012	Spain Spring Open	Málaga, Spain	
400 m freestyle	3:58.50		Benjamin Hockin	Sajonia	12 December 2014	Paraguayan Championships	Asunción, Paraguay	
800 m freestyle	8:25.18		Matheo Mateos	Unattached	5 March 2020	Speedo Champions Series	Plantation, United States	
1500 m freestyle	16:34.89		Sebastian Paredes	Paraguay	30 August 2015	World Junior Championships	Singapore, Singapore	
50 m backstroke	25.15		Charles Hockin	Sajonia	14 December 2019	Paraguayan Championships	Asunción, Paraguay	
100 m backstroke	55.41	rh	Charles Hockin	Paraguay	10 August 2019	Pan American Games	Lima, Peru	
200 m backstroke	2:00.13		Matías López Chaparro	Paraguay	31 March 2016	South American Championships	Asunción, Paraguay	
50 m breaststroke	27.38		Renato Prono	Sajonia	15 December 2017	Paraguayan Championships	Asunción, Paraguay	
100 m breaststroke	1:01.65		Renato Prono	Sajonia	24 April 2019	Paraguayan Championships	Asunción, Paraguay	
200 m breaststroke	2:18.24		Matías López Chaparro	-	30 June 2013	Paraguayan Championships	Asunción, Paraguay	
50 m butterfly	23.82		Benjamin Hockin	Paraguay	24 July 2011	World Championships	Shanghai, China	
100 m butterfly	53.21		Benjamin Hockin	Sajonia	16 March 2012	South American Championships	Belém, Brazil	
200 m butterfly	2:03.31		Benjamin Hockin	Sajonia	13 December 2014	Paraguay Age Group Championships	Asunción, Paraguay	
200m individual medley	2:03.31		Matheo Mateos	Azura Florida Aquatics	2 April 2022	TYR Pro Swim Series	San Antonio, United States	
400m individual medley	4:24.64		Matheo Mateos	Paraguay	3 October 2022	South American Games	Asunción, Paraguay	
4×100m freestyle relay	3:25.54		Charles Hockin (52.24); Favio Persano Segovia (52.03); Jose Emmanuel Lobo Martinez (52.21); Ben Hockin (49.06)	Paraguay	17 March 2012	South American Championships	Belém, Brazil	
4×200m freestyle relay	7:32.67		Ben Hockin (1:49.06); Matias Lopez Chaparro (1:53.26); Maximiliano Abreu (1:57.35); Charles Hockin (1:53.00)	Paraguay	3 October 2014	South American Championships	Mar del Plata, Argentina	
4×100m medley relay	3:42.79		Charles Hockin (56.20); Renato Prono (1:01.69); Ben Hockin (52.54); Matheo Mateos (52.36)	Paraguay	11 November 2018	South American Championships	Trujillo, Peru	

Legend: # – Record awaiting ratification by FEPANA; WR – World record; AM – Americas record;
Records not set in finals: h – heat; sf – semifinal; r – relay 1st leg; rh – relay heat 1st leg; b – B final; † – en route to final mark; so – swim-off; tt – time trial

=== Women ===
Event	Time		Name	Club	Date	Meet	Location	Ref
50 m freestyle	26.49		Karen Riveros	Paraguay	18 December 2015	Argentine Championships	Buenos Aires, Argentina	
100 m freestyle	57.31	h	Karen Riveros	Paraguay	16 December 2015	Argentine Championships	Buenos Aires, Argentina	
200 m freestyle	2:05.31	h	Nicole Rautemberg	Paraguay	30 March 2016	South American Championships	Asunción, Paraguay	
400 m freestyle	4:28.11	h	Nicole Rautemberg	Paraguay	28 August 2015	World Junior Championships	Singapore, Singapore	
800 m freestyle	9:19.33		Cielo Peralta	Azura Florida Aquatics	2 April 2025	Puerto Rico International Open	San Juan, Puerto Rico	
1500 m freestyle	17:52.38		Cielo Peralta	Azura Florida Aquatics	18 January 2025	Azura Winter Open Invite	Davie, United States	
50m backstroke	29.74		Lara Yegros	Club Benjamin Hockin	17 January 2026	CBH Speed Cup	Asunción, Paraguay	
100m backstroke	1:04.59		Maria Arrua	Paraguay	7 November 2018	South American Championships	Trujillo, Peru	
200m backstroke	2:22.45	h, =	María Virginia Báez	Paraguay	31 July 2009	World Championships	Rome, Italy	
200m backstroke	2:22.45	=	Maria Arrua	Paraguay	31 March 2016	South American Championships	Asunción, Paraguay	
50m breaststroke	33.64		Astrid Caballero	Club Deportivo de Puerto Sajon	17 January 2026	CBH Speed Cup	Asunción, Paraguay	
100m breaststroke	1:14.19		Sofia Magaly Lopez Chaparro	Paraguay	23 November 2017	Bolivarian Games	Santa Marta, Colombia	
200m breaststroke	2:39.57		Sofia Magaly Lopez Chaparro	Paraguay	20 November 2017	Bolivarian Games	Santa Marta, Colombia	
50m butterfly	27.33	h	Luana Alonso	Paraguay	4 August 2022	Argentine Championships	Buenos Aires, Argentina	
100m butterfly	59.88	b	Luana Alonso	Southern Methodist University	13 April 2023	TYR Pro Swim Series	Westmont, United States	
200m butterfly	2:16.67		Luana Alonso	Paraguay	5 October 2022	South American Games	Asunción, Paraguay	
200m individual medley	2:22.81		Sofia López Chaparro	Paraguay	16 April 2015	South American Junior Championship	Lima, Peru	
400m individual medley	5:11.13		Sofia López Chaparro	Syc	20 March 2015	Paraguayan Championships	Asunción, Paraguay	
4×100m freestyle relay	3:57.48		Karen Riveros (57.92); Stefania Piccardo (1:00.35); Nicole Maidana Rautemberg (59.24); Maria Jose Arrua (59.97)	Paraguay	30 March 2016	South American Championships	Asunción, Paraguay	
4×200m freestyle relay	9:00.90	h	Luciana Codas (2:11.43); Lara Gimenez (2:16.05); Constanza Areco (2:15.93); Cecilia Piraino (2:17.49)	Paraguay	13 August 2025	Junior Pan American Games	Asunción, Paraguay	
4×100m medley relay	4:27.69		Lara Yegros (1:07.95); Astrid Caballero (1:15.30); Nicole Rautemberg (1:04.97); Chiara Peralta (59.47)	Paraguay	14 September 2026	South American Games	Santa Fe, Argentina	

Legend: # – Record awaiting ratification by FEPANA; WR – World record; AM – Americas record;
Records not set in finals: h – heat; sf – semifinal; r – relay 1st leg; rh – relay heat 1st leg; b – B final; † – en route to final mark; so – swim-off; tt – time trial

=== Mixed relay ===
Event	Time	Name	Club	Date	Meet	Location	Ref
4×100m freestyle relay	3:38.77	Charles Hockin (51.25); Benjamin Hockin (49.67); Maria Jose Arrua (59.93); Karen Riveros (57.92)	Paraguay	1 April 2016	South American Championships	Asunción, Paraguay	
4×100m medley relay	3:57.70	Maria Jose Arrua (1:04.57); Renato Prono (1:01.82); Benjamin Hockin (53.55); Karen Riveros (57.76)	Paraguay	31 March 2016	South American Championships	Asunción, Paraguay	

Legend: # – Record awaiting ratification by FEPANA; WR – World record; AM – Americas record;
Records not set in finals: h – heat; so – swim-off

== Short course (25 m) ==
=== Men ===
Event	Time		Name	Club	Date	Meet	Location	Ref
50 m freestyle	22.00	h	Benjamin Hockin	Paraguay	28 September 2018	World Cup	Eindhoven, Netherlands	
100 m freestyle	47.65	sf	Benjamin Hockin	Paraguay	10 December 2016	World Championships	Windsor, Canada	
200 m freestyle	1:44.24		Benjamin Hockin	Paraguay	12 December 2012	World Championships	Istanbul, Turkey	
400 m freestyle	3:55.42	h	Matias Lopez	Paraguay	6 December 2016	World Championships	Windsor, Canada	
800 m freestyle								
1500 m freestyle								
50m backstroke	23.80	h	Charles Hockin	Paraguay	13 December 2018	World Championships	Hangzhou, China	
100m backstroke	52.80	h	Charles Hockin	Paraguay	6 December 2016	World Championships	Windsor, Canada	
200m backstroke	1:56.01	h	Charles Hockin	Paraguay	28 October 2021	World Cup	Kazan, Russia	
50m breaststroke	26.23		Renato Prono	Paraguay	7 August 2017	World Cup	Berlin, Germany	
100m breaststroke	59.35	h	Renato Prono	Paraguay	11 December 2018	World Championships	Hangzhou, China	
200m breaststroke								
50m butterfly	23.27	h	Ben Hockin	Paraguay	14 December 2012	World Championships	Istanbul, Turkey	
100m butterfly	51.99	h	Ben Hockin	Paraguay	12 December 2012	World Championships	Istanbul, Turkey	
200m butterfly	1:59.65	h	Max Abreu	Paraguay	7 December 2014	World Championships	Doha, Qatar	
100m individual medley	53.67		Benjamin Hockin	Paraguay	30 September 2017	World Cup	Hongkong, Hong Kong	
200m individual medley	1:58.18	h	Matheo Mateos	Paraguay	10 December 2024	World Championships	Budapest, Hungary	
400m individual medley	4:14.73	h	Matheo Mateos	Paraguay	17 December 2022	World Championships	Melbourne, Australia	
4×50m freestyle relay	1:30.46	h	Charles Hockin (22.20); Ben Hockin (21.55); Ivo Kunzle Savastano (23.23); Mathias Zacarias (23.48)	Paraguay	9 December 2016	World Championships	Windsor, Canada	
4×100m freestyle relay	3:19.13	h	Charles Hockin (49.39); Matias Lopez (51.48); Max Abreu (50.78); Ben Hockin (47.48)	Paraguay	3 December 2014	World Championships	Doha, Qatar	
4×200m freestyle relay	7:15.96	h	Ben Hockin (1:44.44); Charles Hockin (1:49.38); Matias Lopez (1:50.94); Max Abreu (1:51.20)	Paraguay	4 December 2014	World Championships	Doha, Qatar	
4×50m medley relay	1:37.18	h	Charles Hockin (24.50); Renato Prono (26.52); Ben Hockin (23.23); Matheo Mateos (22.93)	Paraguay	17 December 2022	World Championships	Melbourne, Australia	
4×100m medley relay	3:37.38	h	Charles Hockin (53.28); Renato Prono (1:00.62); Ben Hockin (51.88); Matias Lopez (51.60)	Paraguay	11 December 2016	World Championships	Windsor, Canada	

Legend: # – Record awaiting ratification by FEPANA; WR – World record; AM – Americas record;
Records not set in finals: h – heat; sf – semifinal; r – relay 1st leg; rh – relay heat 1st leg; b – B final; † – en route to final mark; so – swim-off; tt – time trial

=== Women ===
Event	Time		Name	Club	Date	Meet	Location	Ref
50m freestyle	26.37	h	Maria Lopez Nery Huerta	Paraguay	15 December 2012	World Championships	Istanbul, Turkey	
100m freestyle	56.15	h	Karen Riveros	Paraguay	7 December 2016	World Championships	Windsor, Canada	
200m freestyle	2:03.89		Nicole Rautemberg	Paraguay	9 September 2016	Copa España	Santiago, Chile	
400m freestyle	4:23.57		Nicole Rautemberg	Paraguay	9 September 2016	Copa España	Santiago, Chile	
800m freestyle								
1500m freestyle	17:35.46		Nicole Rautemberg	Paraguay	16 June 2016	National Championships	Asunción, Paraguay	
50m backstroke	28.99		Maria Jose Arrua	Club Deportivo de Puerto Sajon	28 August 2026	Sajonia Club Anniversary Cup	Asunción, Paraguay	
100m backstroke	1:03.10	h	Lara Yegros	Paraguay	10 December 2024	World Championships	Budapest, Hungary	
200m backstroke	2:20.72		Lara Yegros	Club Benjamin Hockin	24 August 2024	CD Anniversary Tournament	Asunción, Paraguay	
50m breaststroke	32.91		Astrid Caballero	Club Deportivo de Puerto Sajon	28 August 2026	Sajonia Club Anniversary Cup	Asunción, Paraguay	
100m breaststroke	1:11.93		Astrid Caballero	Club Deportivo de Puerto Sajon	4 May 2024	Anniversary Centenary Cup	Asunción, Paraguay	
200m breaststroke	2:38.51		Astrid Caballero	Sajonia	14 July 2022	National Championships	Asunción, Paraguay	
50m butterfly	27.10	h, †	Luana Alonso	Paraguay	17 December 2022	World Championships	Melbourne, Australia	
100m butterfly	58.90	h	Luana Alonso	Paraguay	13 September 2022	José Finkel Trophy	Recife, Brazil	
200m butterfly	2:12.19	h	Luana Alonso	Paraguay	15 December 2022	World Championships	Melbourne, Australia	
100m individual medley	1:03.69		Maria Jose Arrua	Club Deportivo de Puerto Sajon	28 August 2026	Sajonia Club Anniversary Cup	Asunción, Paraguay	
200m individual medley	2:21.04		Luana Alonso	Club Benjamin Hockin	13 July 2022	National Championships	Asunción, Paraguay	
400m individual medley	5:05.12		Nicole Rautemberg	Paraguay	22 November 2014	Promesas del Cono Sur	Entre Rios, Argentina	
4×50m freestyle relay	1:47.83	h	Karen Riveros (26.38); Maria Jose Arrua (26.54); Nicole Rautemberg (27.41); Alma Castillo (27.50)	Paraguay	11 December 2016	World Championships	Windsor, Canada	
4×100m freestyle relay	3:55.53	h	Karen Riveros (57.28); Sofía López (59.59); Nicole Rautemberg (1:00.08); Maria Jose Arrua (58.58)	Paraguay	6 December 2016	World Championships	Windsor, Canada	
4×200m freestyle relay								
4×50m medley relay	2:01.55	h	Maria Jose Arrua (30.47); Sophia Ortiz (35.90); Nicole Rautemberg (28.40); Karen Riveros (26.78)	Paraguay	7 December 2016	World Championships	Windsor, Canada	
4×100m medley relay								

Legend: # – Record awaiting ratification by FEPANA; WR – World record; AM – Americas record;
Records not set in finals: h – heat; sf – semifinal; r – relay 1st leg; rh – relay heat 1st leg; b – B final; † – en route to final mark; so – swim-off; tt – time trial

=== Mixed relay ===
Event	Time		Name	Club	Date	Meet	Location	Ref
4×50 m freestyle relay	1:37.00	h	Charles Hockin Brusquetti (22.22); Ben Hockin (21.72); Karen Riveros (26.11); Maria Jose Arrua (26.95)	Paraguay	7 December 2016	World Championships	Windsor, Canada	
4×50 m medley relay	1:44.55	h	Charles Hockin Brusquetti (24.15); Renato Prono (26.34); Nicole Rautemberg (28.12); Karen Riveros (25.94)	Paraguay	8 December 2016	World Championships	Windsor, Canada	

Legend: # – Record awaiting ratification by FEPANA; WR – World record; AM – Americas record;
Records not set in finals: h – heat; so – swim-off

== See also ==
- List of Paraguayan records in athletics
