= 2016 FINA World Swimming Championships (25 m) – 4 × 50 metre mixed medley relay =

4 × 50 metre mixed medley relay at the 2016 FINA World Swimming Championships (25 m)
- Venue: WFCU Centre
- Dates: 8 December (heats and final)
- Competitors: 124 from 31 nations
- Teams: 31
- Winning time: 1:37.22

Medalists
gold medal	Tom Shields; Lilly King; Kelsi Worrell; Michael Chadwick; Ali De Loof; Cody Miller; Matthew Josa; Mallory Comerford	United States
silver medal	Etiene Medeiros; Felipe Lima; Nicholas Santos; Larissa Oliveira	Brazil
bronze medal	Junya Koga; Yoshiki Yamanaka; Rikako Ikee; Sayuki Ouchi; Emi Moronuki; Takeshi Kawamoto	Japan

The 4 × 50 metre mixed medley relay competition of the 2016 FINA World Swimming Championships (25 m) was held on 8 December 2016.

== Records ==
Prior to the competition, the existing world and championship records were as follows.

	Nation	Time	Location	Date
World record	United States	1:37.17	Glasgow	21 December 2013
Championship record	Brazil	1:37.26	Doha	4 December 2014

== Results ==
=== Heats ===
The heats were held at 11:53.

Rank	Heat	Lane	Nation	Swimmers	Time	Notes
1	2	3	United States	Ali DeLoof (26.18); Cody Miller (25.82); Matthew Josa (22.71); Mallory Comerford (24.11)	1:38.82	Q
2	3	9	Russia	Grigory Tarasevich (23.73); Kirill Prigoda (25.75); Svetlana Chimrova (25.79); Rozaliya Nasretdinova (24.09)	1:39.36	Q
3	3	5	Brazil	Etiene Medeiros (26.18); Felipe Lima (25.70); Nicholas Santos (22.57); Larissa Oliveira (25.07)	1:39.52	Q
4	3	3	Canada	Javier Acevedo (24.01); Richard Funk (26.38); Katerine Savard (25.63); Michelle Williams (23.61)	1:39.63	Q
5	4	3	Italy	Silvia Scalia (27.34); Fabio Scozzoli (26.14); Silvia Di Pietro (25.21); Luca Dotto (21.48)	1:40.17	Q
6	4	0	China	Xu Jiayu (23.62); Li Xiang (26.40); Zhang Yufei (25.71); Tang Yuting (24.53)	1:40.26	Q
7	2	6	Japan	Emi Moronuki (27.08); Yoshiki Yamanaka (26.48); Takeshi Kawamoto (22.38); Sayuki Ouchi (24.53)	1:40.47	Q
8	1	6	Sweden	Jesper Björk (24.27); Johannes Skagius (25.95); Sara Junevik (25.60); Ida Lindborg (24.67)	1:40.49	Q
9	1	5	Belarus	Aliaksandra Herasimenia (26.87); Ilya Shymanovich (26.76); Yauhen Tsurkin (22.71); Yuliya Khitraya (24.18)	1:40.52	
10	3	4	Finland	Fanny Teijonsalo (28.02); Jenna Laukkanen (29.65); Riku Pöytäkivi (22.85); Ari-Pekka Liukkonen (21.01)	1:41.53	
11	1	4	Czech Republic	Tomas Franta (24.37); Petr Bartunek (26.85); Lucie Svěcená (25.86); Barbora Seemanová (24.92)	1:42.00	
12	2	5	France	Thomas Avetand (24.45); Solene Gallego (30.90); Yonel Govindin (23.89); Anna Santamans (23.71)	1:42.95	
13	2	1	South Africa	Mariella Venter (28.35); Giulio Zorzi (25.74); Alard Basson (24.39); Tayla Lovemore (24.88)	1:43.36	
14	4	5	Switzerland	Jérémy Desplanches (25.42); Martin Schweizer (26.57); Martina van Berkel (27.55); Maria Ugolkova (24.22)	1:43.76	
15	4	1	Latvia	Kristina Steina (28.46); Nikolajs Maskalenko (26.40); Gabriela Ņikitina (26.96); Uvis Kalnins (21.97)	1:43.79	
16	3	6	Iceland	David Adalsteinsson (25.15); Hrafnhildur Lúthersdóttir (30.00); Bryndis Hansen (26.17); Aron Orn Stefansson (22.52)	1:43.84	
17	4	8	Argentina	Gaston Hernandez (24.97); Macareno Ceballos (30.88); Marcos Barale (23.54); Andrea Berrino (24.61)	1:44.00	
18	3	7	Hong Kong	Wong Toto Kwan To (27.96); Chun Yan Wong (27.75); Sze Hang Yu (26.19); Kin Tat Kent Cheung (22.11)	1:44.01	
19	1	3	Paraguay	Charles Hockin (24.15); Renato Prono (26.34); Nicole Rautemberg (28.12); Karen Riveros (25.94)	1:44.55	
20	2	9	Slovakia	Karolína Hájková (28.97); Marek Botik (26.70); Barbora Mišendová (26.96); Vladimir Stefanik (22.50)	1:45.13	
21	3	2	Singapore	Francis Fong (25.88); Chien Yin Khoo (27.21); Marina Chan (27.02); Amanda Lim (25.59)	1:45.70	
22	3	1	Macau	Pok Man Ngou (26.29); Man Hou Chao (26.86); Chi Yan Tan (29.09); Lei On Kei (26.25)	1:48.49	
23	2	2	Zambia	Jade Howard (30.08); Alex Aziotis (29.32); Ralph Goveia (24.20); Tilka Paljk (26.41)	1:50.01	
24	2	7	Kenya	Steven Kimani Maina (27.47); Rebecca Kamau (32.60); Issa Abdulla Hemed Mohamed (25.10); Sylvia Brunlehner (26.00)	1:51.17	
25	4	6	Seychelles	Alexus Laird (29.94); Samuele Rossi (30.04); Felicity Passon (27.47); Dean Hoffmann (24.06)	1:51.51	
26	3	8	Panama	Hernan Gonzalez Medina (26.62); Jeancarlo Calderon Harper (30.57); Ireyra Tamayo Periñan (29.32); Catharine Cooper Gomez (26.40)	1:52.91	
27	3	0	Dominican Republic	Jhonny Perez (27.37); Marc Rojas (29.15); Mariel Mencia (29.92); Arianna Sanna (26.60)	1:53.04	
28	4	9	Angola	Joao Matias (27.14); Pedro Pinotes (29.32); Ana Sofia Nóbrega (29.12); Yara Lima (27.96)	1:53.54	
29	4	2	Honduras	Maeform Borriello (30.70); Marco Flores (30.38); George Jabbour (25.58); Sara Pastrana (27.11)	1:53.77	
30	4	4	Curaçao	Adrian Hoek (27.42); Rainier Rafaela (29.51); Chade Nersicio (29.07); Tiareth Cijntje (27.99)	1:53.99	
31	2	4	Albania	Kennet Libohova (29.35); Deni Baholli (30.67); Diana Basho (33.36); Alesia Neziri (29.45)	2:02.83	
	1	5	Fiji			DNS

=== Final ===
The final was held at 20:20.

Rank	Lane	Nation	Swimmers	Time	Notes
1st place, gold medalist(s)	4	United States	Tom Shields (23.45); Lilly King (28.74); Kelsi Worrell (24.59); Michael Chadwick (20.44)	1:37.22	CR
2nd place, silver medalist(s)	3	Brazil	Etiene Medeiros (25.93); Felipe Lima (25.46); Nicholas Santos (21.93); Larissa Oliveira (24.42)	1:37.74	
3rd place, bronze medalist(s)	1	Japan	Junya Koga (22.74); Yoshiki Yamanaka (26.48); Rikako Ikee (24.89); Sayuki Ouchi (24.34)	1:38.45	
4	7	China	Xu Jiayu (23.35); Yan Zibei (26.13); Zhang Yufei (25.51); Zhu Menghui (23.94)	1:38.93	
5	6	Canada	Javier Acevedo (23.58); Richard Funk (26.31); Katerine Savard (25.42); Michelle Williams (23.67)	1:38.98	
6	5	Russia	Andrey Shabasov (23.61); Kirill Prigoda (25.63); Svetlana Chimrova (25.80); Rozaliya Nasretdinova (24.07)	1:39.11	
7	8	Sweden	Jesper Björk (24.41); Johannes Skagius (25.69); Sara Junevik (25.78); Ida Lindborg (24.63)	1:40.51	
	2	Italy	Silvia Scalia (27.31); Fabio Scozzoli (25.63); Silvia Di Pietro (25.05); Luca Dotto		DSQ
