= Paraguay at the 2015 World Aquatics Championships =

- Flag of Paraguay
- World Aquatics code: PAR
- National federation: Federación Paraguaya de Natación
- Website: www.fepana.org.py

in Kazan, Russia
- Competitors: 5 in 1 sport
- Medals: Gold 0 Silver 0 Bronze 0 Total 0

World Aquatics Championships appearances
- 1973; 1975; 1978; 1982; 1986; 1991; 1994; 1998; 2001; 2003; 2005; 2007; 2009; 2011; 2013; 2015; 2017; 2019; 2022; 2023; 2024; 2025

Paraguay competed at the 2015 World Aquatics Championships in Kazan, Russia from 24 July to 9 August 2015.

== Swimming ==
Paraguayan swimmers have achieved qualifying standards in the following events (up to a maximum of 2 swimmers in each event at the A-standard entry time, and 1 at the B-standard):

Men

Athlete	Event	Heat		Semifinal		Final	
Athlete	Event	Time	Rank	Time	Rank	Time	Rank
Benjamin Hockin	100 m freestyle	50.19	43	did not advance			
Benjamin Hockin	200 m freestyle	1:49.60	37	did not advance			
Benjamin Hockin	50 m butterfly	24.24	34	did not advance			
Benjamin Hockin	100 m butterfly	53.92	39	did not advance			
Charles Hockin	50 m backstroke	26.57	44	did not advance			
Charles Hockin	100 m backstroke	57.84	50	did not advance			
Matías López	200 m backstroke	2:01.74	28	did not advance			
Renato Prono	50 m breaststroke	28.06	28	did not advance			
Renato Prono	100 m breaststroke	1:02.69	44	did not advance			
Charles Hockin; Matías López; Renato Prono; Benjamin Hockin	4×100 m freestyle relay	3:28.04	29	—		did not advance	

Women

Athlete	Event	Heat		Semifinal		Final	
Athlete	Event	Time	Rank	Time	Rank	Time	Rank
Karen Riveros	50 m freestyle	27.63	=64	did not advance			
Karen Riveros	100 m freestyle	58.95	62	did not advance			
