= Paraguay at the 2013 World Aquatics Championships =

- Flag of Paraguay
- World Aquatics code: PAR
- National federation: Federación Paraguaya de Natación
- Website: www.fepana.org.py

in Barcelona, Spain
- Competitors: 4 in 1 sports
- Medals: Gold 0 Silver 0 Bronze 0 Total 0

World Aquatics Championships appearances
- 1973; 1975; 1978; 1982; 1986; 1991; 1994; 1998; 2001; 2003; 2005; 2007; 2009; 2011; 2013; 2015; 2017; 2019; 2022; 2023; 2024; 2025

Paraguay is competing at the 2013 World Aquatics Championships in Barcelona, Spain between 19 July and 4 August 2013.

== Swimming ==
Paraguayan swimmers achieved qualifying standards in the following events (up to a maximum of 2 swimmers in each event at the A-standard entry time, and 1 at the B-standard):

Men

Athlete	Event	Heat		Semifinal		Final	
Athlete	Event	Time	Rank	Time	Rank	Time	Rank
Charles Hockin	50 m backstroke	26.41	30	did not advance			
Charles Hockin	100 m backstroke	56.50	31	did not advance			
Benjamin Hockin	100 m freestyle	49.61 NR	=21	did not advance			
Benjamin Hockin	200 m freestyle	1:51.46	39	did not advance			
Benjamin Hockin	50 m butterfly	23.94	25	did not advance			
Benjamin Hockin	100 m butterfly	53.28	27	did not advance			

Women

Athlete	Event	Heat		Semifinal		Final	
Athlete	Event	Time	Rank	Time	Rank	Time	Rank
María López Nery	50 m butterfly	28.84	43	did not advance			
María López Nery	200 m freestyle	2:09.81 NR	38	did not advance			
Karen Riveros	50 m freestyle	27.36	49	did not advance			
Karen Riveros	100 m freestyle	58.44	52	did not advance			
