= 2016 FINA World Swimming Championships (25 m) – Women's 4 × 50 metre freestyle relay =

Women's 4 × 50 metre freestyle relay at the 2016 FINA World Swimming Championships (25 m)
- Venue: WFCU Centre
- Dates: 11 December (heats and final)
- Competitors: 54 from 12 nations
- Teams: 12
- Winning time: 1:35.00

Medalists
gold medal	Michelle Williams; Sandrine Mainville; Taylor Ruck; Penny Oleksiak; Alexia Zevnik; Sarah Darcel	Canada
silver medal	Tamara van Vliet; Ranomi Kromowidjojo; Maaike de Waard; Kim Busch; Maud van der Meer	Netherlands
bronze medal	Silvia Di Pietro; Erika Ferraioli; Aglaia Pezzato; Federica Pellegrini	Italy

The Women's 4 × 50 metre freestyle relay competition of the 2016 FINA World Swimming Championships (25 m) was held on 11 December 2016.

== Records ==
Prior to the competition, the existing world and championship records were as follows.

	Nation	Time	Location	Date
World record Championship record	Netherlands	1:34.24	Doha	7 December 2014

== Results ==
=== Heats ===
The heats were held at 09:30.

Rank	Heat	Lane	Nation	Swimmers	Time	Notes
1	2	8	Denmark	Julie Kepp Jensen (24.76); Mie Nielsen (24.38); Emilie Beckmann (24.70); Jeanette Ottesen (23.54)	1:37.38	Q
2	2	6	Netherlands	Tamara van Vliet (24.44); Maaike de Waard (24.39); Kim Busch (24.16); Maud van der Meer (24.46)	1:37.45	Q
3	1	3	Canada	Sandrine Mainville (24.35); Alexia Zevnik (24.54); Taylor Ruck (24.12); Sarah Darcel (24.90)	1:37.91	Q, NR
4	1	6	France	Anna Santamans (24.39); Mélanie Henique (24.30); Marie Wattel (24.55); Mathilde Cini (24.73)	1:37.97	Q
5	2	3	United States	Katrina Konopka (24.76); Ali DeLoof (24.22); Marta Cieśla (25.05); Mallory Comerford (24.08)	1:38.11	Q
6	1	2	Italy	Silvia Di Pietro (24.64); Erika Ferraioli (24.15); Aglaia Pezzato (24.73); Federica Pellegrini (24.63)	1:38.15	Q
7	2	4	China	Tang Yuting (24.91); Sun Meichen (24.73); Shen Duo (24.95); Zhu Menghui (23.65)	1:38.24	Q, AS
8	1	7	Japan	Sayuki Ouchi (24.84); Yui Yamane (24.61); Tomomi Aoki (24.79); Asuka Kobayashi (25.30)	1:39.54	Q
9	1	1	Sweden	Nathalie Lindborg (25.54); Sara Junevik (25.43); Sophie Hansson (25.82); Ida Lindborg (25.32)	1:42.11	
10	2	2	Singapore	Amanda Lim (25.66); Marina Chan (25.26); Hoong En Qi (26.14); Roanne Ho (26.14)	1:43.20	NR
11	1	4	Macau	Lei On Kei (26.34); Tan Chi Yan (26.35); Choi Weng Tong (27.38); Long Chi Wai (26.86)	1:46.93	NR
12	2	7	Paraguay	Karen Riveros (26.38); Maria Arrua (26.54); Nicole Rautemberg (27.41); Alma Castillo (27.50)	1:47.83	NR
	1	5	Australia			DNS
	2	1	Seychelles			DNS
	2	5	Algeria			DNS

=== Final ===
The final was held at 18:30.

Rank	Lane	Nation	Swimmers	Time	Notes
1st place, gold medalist(s)	3	Canada	Michelle Williams (24.07); Sandrine Mainville (23.62); Taylor Ruck (23.77); Penny Oleksiak (23.54)	1:35.00	NR
2nd place, silver medalist(s)	5	Netherlands	Tamara van Vliet (24.45); Ranomi Kromowidjojo (23.11); Maaike de Waard (24.09); Kim Busch (23.72)	1:35.37	
3rd place, bronze medalist(s)	7	Italy	Silvia Di Pietro (23.92); Erika Ferraioli (23.52); Aglaia Pezzato (24.06); Federica Pellegrini (24.11)	1:35.61	NR
4	2	United States	Amanda Weir (24.37); Kelsi Worrell (23.57); Madison Kennedy (24.10); Katrina Konopka (23.82)	1:35.86	
5	4	Denmark	Julie Kepp Jensen (24.82); Mie Nielsen (24.00); Emilie Beckmann (24.48); Jeanette Ottesen (23.68)	1:36.98	
6	6	France	Mélanie Henique (24.64); Marie Wattel (24.50); Mathilde Cini (24.46); Anna Santamans (23.61)	1:37.21	
7	1	China	Tang Yuting (25.21); Sun Meichen (24.35); Shen Duo (24.81); Zhu Menghui (23.59)	1:37.96	AS
8	8	Japan	Sayuki Ouchi (24.58); Yui Yamane (24.78); Tomomi Aoki (24.95); Asuka Kobayashi (25.48)	1:39.79	
