= 2016 FINA World Swimming Championships (25 m) – Women's 100 metre freestyle =

Women's 100 metre freestyle at the 2016 FINA World Swimming Championships (25 m)
- Venue: WFCU Centre
- Dates: 7 December (heats and semifinals); 8 December (final)
- Competitors: 127 from 90 nations
- Winning time: 51.81

Medalists
gold medal	Brittany Elmslie	Australia
silver medal	Ranomi Kromowidjojo	Netherlands
bronze medal	Penny Oleksiak	Canada

The Women's 100 metre freestyle competition of the 2016 FINA World Swimming Championships (25 m) was held on 7 and 8 December 2016.

== Records ==
Prior to the competition, the existing world and championship records were as follows.

	Name	Nation	Time	Location	Date
World record	Cate Campbell	Australia	50.91	Sydney	28 November 2015
Championship record	Femke Heemskerk	Netherlands	51.37	Doha	5 December 2014

== Results ==
=== Heats ===
The heats were held at 10:17.

Rank	Heat	Lane	Name	Nationality	Time	Notes
1	14	2	Penny Oleksiak	Canada	52.36	Q, NR
2	13	5	Brittany Elmslie	Australia	52.72	Q
3	14	4	Ranomi Kromowidjojo	Netherlands	52.75	Q
4	13	6	Sandrine Mainville	Canada	52.97	Q
5	14	5	Federica Pellegrini	Italy	53.05	Q
6	14	3	Zhu Menghui	China	53.06	Q
7	13	4	Jeanette Ottesen	Denmark	53.14	Q
8	12	5	Rikako Ikee	Japan	53.17	Q
9	14	1	Zsuzsanna Jakabos	Hungary	53.28	Q
10	12	3	Amanda Weir	United States	53.43	Q
11	12	4	Veronika Popova	Russia	53.50	Q
12	13	3	Erika Ferraioli	Italy	53.67	Q
13	14	9	Isabella Arcila	Colombia	53.70	Q, NR
14	12	6	Madison Kennedy	United States	53.73	Q
15	14	6	Larissa Oliveira	Brazil	53.77	Q
16	13	1	Marie Wattel	France	53.78	Q
17	13	2	Rozaliya Nasretdinova	Russia	53.90	
18	14	7	Carla Buchanan	Australia	53.96	
19	11	2	Maria Ugolkova	Switzerland	53.97	
20	11	3	Annika Bruhn	Germany	53.99	
21	14	0	Hanna-Maria Seppälä	Finland	54.08	
22	12	2	Marrit Steenbergen	Netherlands	54.12	
23	10	4	Sze Hang Yu	Hong Kong	54.59	
23	12	1	Barbora Seemanová	Czech Republic	54.59	
25	11	4	Evelyn Verrasztó	Hungary	54.60	
26	12	7	Yui Yamane	Japan	54.62	
27	11	7	Kimberly Buys	Belgium	54.64	
27	13	7	Shen Duo	China	54.64	
29	9	4	Bryndis Hansen	Iceland	54.67	
30	11	6	Yuliya Khitraya	Belarus	54.68	
31	12	8	Nastja Govejšek	Slovenia	54.75	
32	13	8	Birgit Koschischek	Austria	54.87	
33	12	0	Susann Bjørnsen	Norway	54.92	
34	11	5	Julie Kepp Jensen	Denmark	54.99	
35	13	0	Nina Rangelova	Bulgaria	55.06	
36	8	5	Karen Torrez	Bolivia	55.25	
37	10	5	Felicity Passon	Seychelles	55.38	
38	11	1	Kertu Ly Alnek	Estonia	55.46	
39	11	8	Tayla Lovemore	South Africa	55.49	
40	13	9	Manuella Lyrio	Brazil	55.50	
41	10	3	Natthanan Junkrajang	Thailand	55.59	
42	14	8	Nathalie Lindborg	Sweden	55.63	
43	10	2	Jasmine Alkhaldi	Philippines	55.75	
44	11	0	Isabel Gose	Germany	55.76	
45	8	6	Anastasia Bogdanovski	Macedonia	55.98	
46	9	2	Bexx Heyliger	Bermuda	56.15	
46	9	7	Karen Riveros	Paraguay	56.15	
48	11	9	Barbora Mišendová	Slovakia	56.25	
49	10	8	Allyson Ponson	Aruba	56.34	
50	10	0	Amel Melih	Algeria	56.38	
51	10	7	Jenjira Srisa-Ard	Thailand	56.39	
52	10	9	Amanda Lim	Singapore	56.52	
53	12	9	Mathilde Cini	France	56.62	
54	10	6	Gabriela Ņikitina	Latvia	56.64	
55	10	1	Marina Chan	Singapore	56.67	
56	9	3	Lushavel Stickland	Samoa	56.88	
57	7	5	Lauren Hew	Cayman Islands	56.99	
58	8	3	Jessica Cattaneo	Peru	57.11	
59	7	8	Inés Remersaro	Uruguay	57.18	NR
59	8	4	Kelsie Campbell	Jamaica	57.18	
61	8	7	Kimiko Raheem	Sri Lanka	57.42	
62	7	6	Sara Nysted	Faroe Islands	57.43	
63	9	5	Jade Howard	Zambia	57.50	
64	8	1	Andrea Cedrón Rodríguez	Peru	57.61	
65	8	2	Sylvia Brunlehner	Kenya	57.68	
66	4	6	Cheyenne Rova	Fiji	57.79	
66	6	5	Emily Muteti	Kenya	57.79	
68	9	8	Alexus Laird	Seychelles	57.84	
69	5	4	Sara Pastrana	Honduras	57.89	
70	5	1	Celina Marquez	El Salvador	57.91	
71	6	4	Ana Sofia Nóbrega	Angola	58.05	
72	8	9	Tan Chi Yan	Macau	58.13	
73	8	8	Arianna Sanna	Dominican Republic	58.20	
74	6	1	Matelita Buadromo	Fiji	58.21	
75	7	4	Ines Marin	Chile	58.26	
76	9	0	Maria Arrua	Paraguay	58.36	
77	8	0	Lei On Kei	Macau	58.48	
78	6	0	Naomy Grand'Pierre	Haiti	58.55	
79	6	2	Ireyra Tamayo Periñan	Panama	58.63	
80	5	9	Tilka Paljk	Zambia	58.67	
81	9	9	Chade Nersicio	Curaçao	58.86	
82	6	8	Fatima Alkaramova	Azerbaijan	59.05	
83	6	6	Gabriella Doueihy	Lebanon	59.24	
83	7	0	Alison Jackson	Cayman Islands	59.24	
85	4	1	Maeform Borriello	Honduras	59.28	
86	5	8	Malavika Vishwanath	India	59.40	
87	5	7	Ani Poghosyan	Armenia	59.43	
87	6	3	Catharine Cooper Gomez	Panama	59.43	
89	7	1	Jeanne Boutbien	Senegal	59.64	
90	7	7	Mónica Ramírez Abella	Andorra	59.66	
91	7	3	Rahaf Baqleh	Jordan	59.67	
92	6	7	Jennifer Rizkallah	Lebanon	59.73	
93	5	6	Estellah Fils Rabetsara	Madagascar	59.92	
94	4	4	Mariel Mencía	Dominican Republic	59.97	
95	4	8	Gabriela Hernandez	Nicaragua	1:00.03	
96	5	5	Lea Ricart Martinez	Andorra	1:00.06	
97	5	2	Maana Patel	India	1:00.31	
98	4	2	Katie Kyle	Saint Lucia	1:00.46	
99	3	5	Sonia Tumiotto	Tanzania	1:00.47	
100	1	4	Lani Cabrera	Barbados	1:00.69	
101	5	3	Samantha Roberts	Antigua and Barbuda	1:00.93	
102	4	3	Christina Linares	Gibraltar	1:00.96	
103	3	1	Colleen Furgeson	Marshall Islands	1:01.07	
104	4	5	McKayla Treasure	Barbados	1:01.12	
105	3	4	Fernanda Archila	Guatemala	1:01.34	
106	4	7	Annah Auckburaullee	Mauritius	1:01.41	
107	3	8	Annie Hepler	Marshall Islands	1:01.67	
108	5	0	Yara Lima	Angola	1:01.75	
109	7	9	Dara Al-Bakry	Jordan	1:01.87	
110	3	2	Tiareth Cijntje	Curaçao	1:02.38	
111	3	7	Jamila Sanmoogan	Guyana	1:02.63	
112	4	0	Sofia Shan	Nepal	1:02.91	
113	4	9	Tiana Rabarijaona	Madagascar	1:03.24	
114	2	6	Charissa Panuve	Tonga	1:04.74	
115	2	3	Bisma Khan	Pakistan	1:04.76	
116	3	3	Flaka Pruthi	Kosovo	1:04.80	
117	2	7	Osisang Chilton	Palau	1:04.88	
118	2	4	Shanice Paraka	Papua New Guinea	1:04.93	
119	2	2	Pak Mi-song	North Korea	1:04.94	
120	3	6	Alesia Neziri	Albania	1:05.33	
121	2	5	Shreetika Singh	Nepal	1:06.54	
122	3	0	Angel de Jesus	Northern Mariana Islands	1:06.97	
123	3	9	Aminath Shajan	Maldives	1:07.43	
124	2	1	Ammara Pinto	Malawi	1:08.35	
125	2	0	Robyn Young	Eswatini	1:10.35	
126	2	8	Tayamika Chang'anamun	Malawi	1:14.36	
127	1	3	Laraiba Seibou	Benin	1:18.23	
	1	5	Fatoumata Samassékou	Mali		DNS
	6	9	Britheny Joassaint	Haiti		DNS
	7	2	Jessica Eriksson	Sweden		DNS
	9	1	Naomi Ruele	Botswana		DNS
	9	6	Bayan Jumah	Syria		DNS

=== Semifinals ===
The semifinals were held at 19:36.

==== Semifinal 1 ====
Rank	Lane	Name	Nationality	Time	Notes
1	4	Brittany Elmslie	Australia	52.19	Q
2	6	Rikako Ikee	Japan	52.47	Q
3	5	Sandrine Mainville	Canada	52.58	Q
4	3	Zhu Menghui	China	52.90	Q
5	2	Amanda Weir	United States	53.10	
6	1	Madison Kennedy	United States	53.24	
7	7	Erika Ferraioli	Italy	53.60	
8	8	Marie Wattel	France	53.66	

==== Semifinal 2 ====
Rank	Lane	Name	Nationality	Time	Notes
1	4	Penny Oleksiak	Canada	52.19	Q, NR
2	5	Ranomi Kromowidjojo	Netherlands	52.76	Q
3	3	Federica Pellegrini	Italy	52.77	Q
4	7	Veronika Popova	Russia	52.94	Q
5	6	Jeanette Ottesen	Denmark	53.08	
6	2	Zsuzsanna Jakabos	Hungary	53.23	
7	8	Larissa Oliveira	Brazil	53.67	
8	1	Isabella Arcila	Colombia	53.98	

=== Final ===
The final was held at 18:37.

Rank	Lane	Name	Nationality	Time	Notes
1st place, gold medalist(s)	4	Brittany Elmslie	Australia	51.81	
2nd place, silver medalist(s)	2	Ranomi Kromowidjojo	Netherlands	51.92	
3rd place, bronze medalist(s)	5	Penny Oleksiak	Canada	52.01	WJR, NR
4	3	Rikako Ikee	Japan	52.12	
5	7	Federica Pellegrini	Italy	52.43	
6	6	Sandrine Mainville	Canada	52.52	
7	8	Veronika Popova	Russia	52.53	
8	1	Zhu Menghui	China	52.74	
