= Paraguay at the 2017 World Aquatics Championships =

- Flag of Paraguay
- FINA code: PAR
- National federation: Federación Paraguaya de Natación
- Website: www.fepana.org.py

in Budapest, Hungary
- Competitors: 6 in 1 sport
- Medals: Gold 0 Silver 0 Bronze 0 Total 0

World Aquatics Championships appearances
- 1973; 1975; 1978; 1982; 1986; 1991; 1994; 1998; 2001; 2003; 2005; 2007; 2009; 2011; 2013; 2015; 2017; 2019; 2022; 2023; 2024

Paraguay competed at the 2017 World Aquatics Championships in Budapest, Hungary from 14 July to 30 July.

== Swimming ==
Paraguayan swimmers have achieved qualifying standards in the following events (up to a maximum of 2 swimmers in each event at the A-standard entry time, and 1 at the B-standard):

Men

| Athlete | Event | Heat | | Semifinal | | Final | |
| Athlete | Event | Time | Rank | Time | Rank | Time | Rank |
|---|---|---|---|---|---|---|---|
| Benjamin Hockin | 100 m freestyle | 49.78 | 39 | did not advance | | | |
| Benjamin Hockin | 50 m butterfly | 23.93 | 24 | did not advance | | | |
| Benjamin Hockin | 100 m butterfly | 53.51 | 39 | did not advance | | | |
| Charles Hockin | 50 m backstroke | 25.56 | =27 | did not advance | | | |
| Charles Hockin | 100 m backstroke | 55.81 | =27 | did not advance | | | |
| Matías López | 200 m backstroke | 2:01.84 | 31 | did not advance | | | |
| Renato Prono | 50 m breaststroke | 27.79 | =27 | did not advance | | | |
| Renato Prono | 100 m breaststroke | 1:02.81 | 44 | did not advance | | | |
| Willian Vallejos | 50 m freestyle | 23.76 | =71 | did not advance | | | |
| Benjamin Hockin; Charles Hockin; Matías López; Willian Vallejos | 4×100 m freestyle relay | 3:25.98 | 20 | — | | did not advance | |
| Benjamin Hockin; Charles Hockin; Matías López; Renato Prono | 4×100 m medley relay | 3:45.91 | 20 | — | | did not advance | |

Women

| Athlete | Event | Heat | | Semifinal | | Final | |
| Athlete | Event | Time | Rank | Time | Rank | Time | Rank |
|---|---|---|---|---|---|---|---|
| Nicole Rautemberg | 200 m freestyle | 2:08.42 | 39 | did not advance | | | |
| Nicole Rautemberg | 50 m butterfly | 29.13 | 44 | did not advance | | | |
