= 2016 FINA World Swimming Championships (25 m) – Women's 50 metre freestyle =

Women's 50 metre freestyle at the 2016 FINA World Swimming Championships (25 m)
- Venue: WFCU Centre
- Dates: 10 December (heats and semifinals); 11 December (final)
- Competitors: 113 from 83 nations
- Winning time: 23.60

Medalists
gold medal	Ranomi Kromowidjojo	Netherlands
silver medal	Silvia Di Pietro	Italy
bronze medal	Madison Kennedy	United States

The Women's 50-metre freestyle competition at the 2016 FINA World Swimming Championships (25 m) took place on 10 and 11 December 2016.

== Records ==
Prior to the competition, the existing world and championship records were as follows.

	Name	Nation	Time	Location	Date
World record	Ranomi Kromowidjojo	Netherlands	23.24	Eindhoven	7 August 2013
Championship record	Marleen Veldhuis	Netherlands	23.25	Manchester	13 April 2008

== Results ==
=== Heats ===
The heats were held at 11:28.

Rank	Heat	Lane	Name	Nationality	Time	Notes
1	12	4	Jeanette Ottesen	Denmark	24.03	Q
2	11	3	Michelle Williams	Canada	24.04	Q
3	12	3	Erika Ferraioli	Italy	24.11	Q
3	13	4	Ranomi Kromowidjojo	Netherlands	24.11	Q
5	11	5	Silvia Di Pietro	Italy	24.21	Q
6	12	5	Zhu Menghui	China	24.30	Q
7	13	5	Etiene Medeiros	Brazil	24.31	WD
8	11	8	Brittany Elmslie	Australia	24.33	Q
9	11	6	Anna Santamans	France	24.34	Q
10	13	1	Sandrine Mainville	Canada	24.35	Q
11	12	2	Melanie Henique	France	24.42	Q
12	13	2	Madison Kennedy	United States	24.49	Q
12	13	6	Emily Seebohm	Australia	24.49	WD
12	13	8	Rikako Ikee	Japan	24.49	Q
15	13	3	Rozaliya Nasretdinova	Russia	24.56	Q
16	12	8	Susann Bjørnsen	Norway	24.60	Q
17	11	0	Sayuki Ouchi	Japan	24.66	Q
18	12	6	Amanda Weir	United States	24.67	Q
19	11	7	Yuliya Khitraya	Belarus	24.69	
20	12	1	Larissa Oliveira	Brazil	24.71	
21	11	2	Kim Busch	Netherlands	24.72	
22	12	9	Julie Kepp Jensen	Denmark	24.78	
23	11	1	Isabella Arcila	Colombia	24.84	
24	13	0	Hanna-Maria Seppälä	Finland	24.97	
25	13	7	Birgit Koschischek	Austria	25.06	
26	12	0	Nathalie Lindborg	Sweden	25.08	
27	10	5	Tayla Lovemore	South Africa	25.18	
28	10	4	Jenjira Sirsa-Ard	Thailand	25.23	
29	10	9	Barbora Seemanová	Czech Republic	25.27	
30	9	3	Karen Torrez	Bolivia	25.28	
31	9	8	Bryndis Hansen	Iceland	25.29	
32	10	1	Naomi Ruele	Botswana	25.42	
33	10	6	Amanda Lim	Singapore	25.46	
34	9	4	Kertu Ly Alnek	Estonia	25.54	
35	11	9	Nina Rangelova	Bulgaria	25.58	
36	8	2	Pei Wun Lin	Chinese Taipei	25.59	
37	9	7	Felicity Passon	Seychelles	25.64	
38	10	7	Marina Chan	Singapore	25.74	
39	10	2	Allyson Ponson	Aruba	25.77	
40	9	6	Bexx Heyliger	Bermuda	25.79	
40	10	0	Gabriela Ņikitina	Latvia	25.79	
42	9	1	Amel Melih	Algeria	25.80	
43	7	8	Cheyenne Rova	Fiji	25.82	
44	10	3	Barbora Misendova	Slovakia	25.84	
45	9	5	Chade Nercisio	Curaçao	25.90	
46	12	7	Mariia Kameneva	Russia	25.96	
47	8	5	Jasmine Alkhaldi	Philippines	25.99	
48	8	8	Anastasia Bogdanovski	Macedonia	26.08	
49	9	9	Lushavel Stickland	Samoa	26.10	
50	8	4	Maria Jose Ribera	Bolivia	26.13	
51	10	8	Jade Howard	Zambia	26.15	
52	8	1	Lauren Hew	Cayman Islands	26.49	
52	8	3	Izzy Joachim	Saint Vincent and the Grenadines	26.49	
54	8	0	Karen Riveros	Paraguay	26.60	
55	5	2	Fatima Alkaramova	Azerbaijan	26.61	
55	8	7	Kimiko Raheem	Sri Lanka	26.61	
57	8	9	Emily Muteti	Kenya	26.64	
58	9	2	Sylvia Brunlehner	Kenya	26.66	
59	7	3	Maria Jose Arrua	Paraguay	26.73	
60	5	3	Helena Moreno	Costa Rica	26.79	
60	8	6	Alexus Laird	Seychelles	26.79	
62	6	2	Jeanne Boutbien	Senegal	26.85	
63	7	5	Chi Wai Long	Macau	26.86	
64	1	2	Tilka Paljk	Zambia	26.89	
65	6	4	Arianna Sanna	Dominican Republic	26.96	
66	7	7	Catharine Cooper Gomez	Panama	27.02	
67	6	3	Maana Patel Patel	India	27.04	
68	7	4	Alison Jackson	Cayman Islands	27.13	
69	5	0	Ana Nobrega	Angola	27.15	
69	7	2	Samantha Roberts	Antigua and Barbuda	27.15	
71	6	6	Karen Vilorio	Honduras	27.27	
72	6	9	Monica Ramirez Abella	Andorra	27.39	
73	6	7	Mariel Mencia	Dominican Republic	27.49	
74	5	1	Gabriela Hernandez	Nicaragua	27.51	
75	7	0	Rahaf Baqleh	Jordan	27.53	
76	7	6	Ani Poghosyan	Armenia	27.54	
77	4	6	Sonia Tumiotto	Tanzania	27.57	
77	5	5	Lea Ricart Martinez	Andorra	27.57	
79	7	9	Jennifer Kizkallah	Lebanon	27.60	
80	5	6	Colleen Furgueson	Marshall Islands	27.65	
81	7	1	Dara Al-Bakry	Jordan	27.68	
82	6	5	Weng Tong Choi	Macau	27.71	
83	4	4	Annie Hepler	Marshall Islands	27.83	
83	5	8	Katie Victoria Kyle	Saint Lucia	27.83	
85	6	1	Estellah Fils Rabetsara	Madagascar	27.88	
86	6	0	Jamaris Washshah	United States Virgin Islands	27.92	
87	4	5	Christina Linares	Gibraltar	27.95	
87	5	7	Jamila Sanmoogan	Guyana	27.95	
89	4	2	Mi Song Pak	North Korea	28.03	
90	5	4	Annah Auckburaullee	Mauritius	28.15	
91	4	7	Tiareth Cijntje	Curaçao	28.18	
92	4	1	Yara Lima	Angola	28.58	
93	3	5	Bisma Khan	Pakistan	28.71	
94	5	9	Sofia Shah	Nepal	28.94	
95	3	4	Melisa Zhdrella	Kosovo	29.04	
95	4	3	Tiana Rabarijaona	Madagascar	29.04	
97	4	0	Flaka Pruthi	Kosovo	29.25	
98	4	8	Gabby Gittens	Antigua and Barbuda	29.29	
99	3	8	Charissa Panuve	Tonga	29.33	
100	3	7	Shanice Paraka	Papua New Guinea	29.34	
101	4	9	Alesia Neziri	Albania	29.35	
102	2	5	Osisang Dibech Chilton	Palau	29.61	
103	3	3	Ammara Pinto	Malawi	29.74	
104	3	0	Aminath Shajan	Maldives	29.81	
105	3	1	Angel de Jesus	Northern Mariana Islands	29.89	
106	3	6	Vitny Hemthon	Cambodia	30.14	
107	2	4	Shreetika Singh	Nepal	30.64	
108	2	8	Robyn Young	Eswatini	31.14	
108	3	9	Tayamika Chang'anamuno	Malawi	31.14	
110	2	6	Sompathana Chamberlain	Laos	32.43	
111	2	9	Calina Panuve	Tonga	32.78	
112	2	0	Roukaya Moussa Mahamane	Niger	36.80	
113	1	4	Chloe Sauvourel	Central African Republic	37.23	
-	1	1	Laila Werburi Zangwio	Ghana		DNS
-	1	3	Salle Alatrash	Palestine		DNS
-	1	5	Bunturabie Jalloh	Sierra Leone		DNS
-	1	6	Brhane Demeke Amare	Ethiopia		DNS
-	1	7	Fatoumata Samassekou	Mali		DNS
-	2	1	Elsie Uwamahoro	Burundi		DNS
-	2	2	Mohamed Nazlati	Comoros		DNS
-	2	3	Rahel Fseha Gebresilassie	Ethiopia		DNS
-	2	7	Adzo Kpossi	Togo		DNS
-	3	2	Angelika Ouedgraogo	Burkina Faso		DNS
-	6	8	Britheny Joassaint	Haiti		DNS
-	9	0	Bayan Jumah	Syria		DNS
-	11	4	Aliaksandra Herasimenia	Belarus		DNS
-	13	9	Liu Xiang	China		DNS

=== Semifinals ===
The semifinals were held at 19:16.

==== Semifinal 1 ====
Rank	Lane	Name	Nationality	Time	Notes
1	5	Ranomi Kromowidjojo	Netherlands	23.67	Q
2	6	Anna Santamans	France	24.14	Q
3	8	Amanda Weir	United States	24.18	Q
4	4	Michelle Williams	Canada	24.24	
5	3	Zhu Menghui	China	24.25	
6	7	Rikako Ikee	Japan	24.42	
7	2	Melanie Henique	France	24.46	
8	1	Susann Bjørnsen	Norway	24.61	

==== Semifinal 2 ====
Rank	Lane	Name	Nationality	Time	Notes
1	4	Jeanette Ottesen	Denmark	23.99	Q
2	3	Silvia Di Pietro	Italy	24.04	Q
3	6	Brittany Elmslie	Australia	24.17	Q
4	5	Erika Ferraioli	Italy	24.18	Q
4	7	Madison Kennedy	United States	24.18	Q
6	1	Rozaliya Nasretdinova	Russia	24.23	
7	2	Sandrine Mainville	Canada	24.27	
8	8	Sayuki Ouchi	Japan	24.58	

=== Final ===
The Final was held at 20:02.

Rank	Lane	Name	Nationality	Time	Notes
1st place, gold medalist(s)	4	Ranomi Kromowidjojo	Netherlands	23.60	
2nd place, silver medalist(s)	3	Silvia Di Pietro	Italy	23.90	
3rd place, bronze medalist(s)	8	Madison Kennedy	United States	23.93	
4	5	Jeanette Ottesen	Denmark	24.00	
5	1	Erika Ferraioli	Italy	24.04	
5	6	Anna Santamans	France	24.04	
7	2	Brittany Elmslie	Australia	24.05	
8	7	Amanda Weir	United States	24.48	
