= 2016 FINA World Swimming Championships (25 m) – Women's 4 × 50 metre medley relay =

Women's 4 × 50 metre medley relay at the 2016 FINA World Swimming Championships (25 m)
- Venue: WFCU Centre
- Dates: 7 December (heats and final)
- Competitors: 80 from 20 nations
- Teams: 20
- Winning time: 1:43.27

Medalists
gold medal	Ali DeLoof; Lilly King; Kelsi Worrell; Katrina Konopka	United States
silver medal	Silvia Scalia; Martina Carraro; Silvia Di Pietro; Erika Ferraioli	Italy
bronze medal	Mie Nielsen; Matilde Schroder; Emilie Beckmann; Jeanette Ottesen	Denmark

The Women's 4 × 50 metre medley relay competition of the 2016 FINA World Swimming Championships (25 m) was held on 7 December 2016.

== Records ==
Prior to the competition, the existing world and championship records were as follows.

	Nation	Time	Location	Date
World record Championship record	Denmark	1:44.04	Doha	5 December 2014

== Results ==
=== Heats ===
The heats were held at 09:30.

Rank	Heat	Lane	Nation	Swimmers	Time	Notes
1	1	1	Canada	Kylie Masse (26.67); Kelsey Wog (29.88); Penny Oleksiak (25.42); Michelle Williams (23.52)	1:45.49	Q
2	2	2	United States	Ali DeLoof (26.57); Molly Hannis (29.48); Sarah Gibson (25.63); Katrina Konopka (23.99)	1:45.67	Q
3	2	2	Denmark	Mie Nielsen (26.93); Matilde Schroder (31.03); Emilie Beckmann (25.26); Jeanette Ottesen (23.83)	1:45.67	Q
4	1	6	Italy	Silvia Scalia (27.13); Martina Carraro (30.30); Silvia Di Pietro (25.16); Aglaia Pezzato (24.51)	1:47.10	Q
5	2	4	Russia	Mariia Kameneva (26.87); Valentina Artemyeva (30.45); Svetlana Chimrova (25.94); Rozaliya Nasretdinova (24.02)	1:47.28	Q
6	1	3	Japan	Emi Moronuki (27.22); Miho Teramura (29.88); Asuka Kobayashi (26.01); Sayuki Ouchi (24.84)	1:47.69	Q
7	2	7	China	Liu Xiang (27.29); Shi Jinglin (30.56); Lu Ying (26.04); Zhu Menghui (24.28)	1:48.17	Q
8	3	5	Australia	Minna Atherton (27.06); Jessica Hansen (30.15); Jemma Schlicht (26.44); Carla Buchanan (24.80)	1:48.45	Q
9	1	2	France	Mathilde Cini (27.89); Solene Gallego (30.91); Mélanie Henique (25.56); Anna Santamans (24.15)	1:48.51	
10	3	4	Czech Republic	Simona Baumrtová (27.15); Petra Chocová (30.74); Lucie Svěcená (25.98); Barbora Seemanová (24.94)	1:48.81	
11	3	3	Sweden	Hanna Rosvall (27.79); Sophie Hansson (30.29); Sara Junevik (25.58); Ida Lindborg (25.19)	1:48.85	
12	2	6	Finland	Fanny Teijonsalo (28.01); Jenna Laukkanen (29.77); Emilia Bottas (26.70); Hanna-Maria Seppälä (24.57)	1:49.05	
13	1	7	Austria	Caroline Pilhatsch (27.67); Christina Nothdurfter (30.53); Lena Kreundl (26.42); Birgit Koschischek (24.70)	1:49.32	
14	3	7	Iceland	Eygló Gústafsdóttir (27.40); Hrafnhildur Lúthersdóttir (30.04); Bryndis Hansen (26.01); Johanna Gústafsdóttir (25.96)	1:49.41	
15	2	5	Hong Kong	Wong Toto Kwan To (28.44); Yeung Jamie Zhen Mei (31.01); Chan Kin Lok (26.92); Sze Hang Yu (25.08)	1:51.45	
16	2	1	South Africa	Mariella Venter (27.95); Kaylene Corbett (31.93); Tayla Lovemore (26.18); Gabi Grobler (26.15)	1:52.21	
17	3	2	Slovakia	Karolína Hájková (28.74); Andrea Podmaníková (30.63); Barbora Mišendová (26.85); Karin Tomecková (26.00)	1:52.22	
18	1	5	Singapore	Hoong En Qi (30.00); Roanne Ho (32.07); Marina Chan (27.09); Amanda Lim (26.09)	1:55.25	
19	3	1	Macau	Tan Chi Yan (31.42); Lei On Kei (33.46); Kuan I Cheng (29.75); Long Chi Wai (26.68)	2:01.31	
20	1	4	Paraguay	Maria José Arrua (30.47); Sophia Ortiz (35.90); Nicole Rautemberg (28.40); Karen Riveros (26.78)	2:01.31	
	3	6	Venezuela			DNS

=== Final ===
The final was held at 18:30.

Rank	Lane	Nation	Swimmers	Time	Notes
1st place, gold medalist(s)	5	United States	Ali DeLoof (26.12); Lilly King (28.78); Kelsi Worrell (24.44); Katrina Konopka (23.93)	1:43.27	WR
2nd place, silver medalist(s)	6	Italy	Silvia Scalia (26.96); Martina Carraro (30.12); Silvia Di Pietro (24.88); Erika Ferraioli (23.42)	1:45.38	
3rd place, bronze medalist(s)	3	Denmark	Mie Nielsen (26.71); Matilde Schroder (30.67); Emilie Beckmann (24.96); Jeanette Ottesen (23.64)	1:45.98	
4	4	Canada	Kylie Masse (26.49); Kelsey Wog (30.14); Penny Oleksiak (25.57); Michelle Williams (23.80)	1:46.00	
5	8	Australia	Emily Seebohm (26.37); Jessica Hansen (29.78); Brittany Elmslie (25.97); Carla Buchanan (24.15)	1:46.27	
6	2	Russia	Mariia Kameneva (26.66); Natalia Ivaneeva (29.77); Rozaliya Nasretdinova (25.82); Veronika Popova (24.36)	1:46.61	
7	7	Japan	Emi Moronuki (26.96); Miho Teramura (30.02); Asuka Kobayashi (26.07); Sayuki Ouchi (24.85)	1:47.90	
8	1	China	Liu Xiang (27.04); Shi Jinglin (30.85); Lu Ying (25.72); Zhu Menghui (24.54)	1:48.15	
