= Paraguay at the 2019 World Aquatics Championships =

- Flag of Paraguay
- FINA code: PAR
- National federation: Federación Paraguaya de Natación

in Gwangju, South Korea
- Competitors: 4 in 1 sport
- Medals: Gold 0 Silver 0 Bronze 0 Total 0

World Aquatics Championships appearances
- 1973; 1975; 1978; 1982; 1986; 1991; 1994; 1998; 2001; 2003; 2005; 2007; 2009; 2011; 2013; 2015; 2017; 2019; 2022; 2023; 2024

Paraguay competed at the 2019 World Aquatics Championships in Gwangju, South Korea from 12 to 28 July.

== Swimming ==
Paraguay entered four swimmers.

Men

Athlete	Event	Heat		Semifinal		Final	
Athlete	Event	Time	Rank	Time	Rank	Time	Rank
Ben Hockin	100 m freestyle	49.95	43	did not advance			
Ben Hockin	50 m butterfly	24.23	39	did not advance			
Ben Hockin	100 m butterfly	53.78	37	did not advance			
Charles Hockin	50 m backstroke	25.62	29	did not advance			
Renato Prono	50 m breaststroke	27.80	30	did not advance			
Renato Prono	100 m breaststroke	1:02.28	44	did not advance			

Women

Athlete	Event	Heat		Semifinal		Final	
Athlete	Event	Time	Rank	Time	Rank	Time	Rank
Maria Arrua	50 m backstroke	30.86	33	did not advance			
Maria Arrua	100 m backstroke	1:07.08	52	did not advance			
