= Paraguay at the 2011 World Aquatics Championships =

- Flag of Paraguay
- FINA code: PAR
- National federation: Federación Paraguaya de Natación
- Website: www.fepana.org.py

in Shanghai, China
- Competitors: 3 in 1 sports
- Medals: Gold 0 Silver 0 Bronze 0 Total 0

World Aquatics Championships appearances
- 1973; 1975; 1978; 1982; 1986; 1991; 1994; 1998; 2001; 2003; 2005; 2007; 2009; 2011; 2013; 2015; 2017; 2019; 2022; 2023; 2024

Paraguay competed at the 2011 World Aquatics Championships in Shanghai, China between July 16 and 31, 2011.

== Swimming ==
Paraguay qualified 3 swimmers.

Men

Athlete	Event	Heats		Semifinals		Final	
Athlete	Event	Time	Rank	Time	Rank	Time	Rank
Ben Hockin	Men's 100m Freestyle	50.03	36	did not advance			
Ben Hockin	Men's 200m Freestyle	1:49.85	33	did not advance			
Ben Hockin	Men's 50m Butterfly	23.82	13 Q	23.95	16	did not advance	
Ben Hockin	Men's 100m Butterfly	53.23	27	did not advance			
Genaro Brítez	Men's 100m Breaststroke	1:03.44	56	did not advance			
Genaro Brítez	Men's 200m Breaststroke	2:23.78	47	did not advance			

Women

Athlete	Event	Heats		Semifinals		Final	
Athlete	Event	Time	Rank	Time	Rank	Time	Rank
Karen Riveros	Women's 50m Freestyle	27.76	47	did not advance			
Karen Riveros	Women's 100m Freestyle	59.52	50	did not advance			
