= Paraguay at the 2022 World Aquatics Championships =

- Flag of Paraguay
- FINA code: PAR
- National federation: Federación Paraguaya de Natación

in Budapest, Hungary 18 June 2022 – 3 July 2022
- Competitors: 5 in 1 sport
- Medals Ranked 0th: Gold 0 Silver 0 Bronze 0 Total 0

World Aquatics Championships appearances
- 1973; 1975; 1978; 1982; 1986; 1991; 1994; 1998; 2001; 2003; 2005; 2007; 2009; 2011; 2013; 2015; 2017; 2019; 2022; 2023; 2024

Paraguay competed at the 2022 World Aquatics Championships in Budapest, Hungary from 18 June to 3 July.

== Athletes by discipline ==
The following is the list of number of competitors participating at the Championships per discipline.

| Sport | Men | Women | Total |
|---|---|---|---|
| Artistic swimming | 0 | 0 | 0 |
| Diving | 0 | 0 | 0 |
| Open water swimming | 0 | 0 | 0 |
| Swimming | 4 | 1 | 5 |
| Water polo | 0 | 0 | 0 |
| Total | 4 | 1 | 5 |

== Swimming ==
Men

| Athlete | Event | Heat | | Semifinal | | Final | |
| Athlete | Event | Time | Rank | Time | Rank | Time | Rank |
|---|---|---|---|---|---|---|---|
| Ben Hockin | 100 m freestyle | 50.48 | 53 | Did not advance | | | |
| Ben Hockin | 50 m butterfly | 24.38 | 44 | Did not advance | | | |
| Charles Hockin | 50 m backstroke | 26.17 | 31 | Did not advance | | | |
| Charles Hockin | 100 m backstroke | 57.01 | 34 | Did not advance | | | |
| Matheo Mateos | 200 m individual medley | 2:04.73 | 30 | Did not advance | | | |
| Matheo Mateos | 400 m individual medley | 4:30.20 | 27 | — | | Did not advance | |
| Renato Prono | 50 m breaststroke | 28.41 | 30 | Did not advance | | | |

Women

| Athlete | Event | Heat | | Semifinal | | Final | |
| Athlete | Event | Time | Rank | Time | Rank | Time | Rank |
|---|---|---|---|---|---|---|---|
| Luana Alonso | 50 m butterfly | DNS | | Did not advance | | | |
| Luana Alonso | 100 m butterfly | 1:01.25 | 20 | Did not advance | | | |
