= Paraguay at the 2024 World Aquatics Championships =

- Flag of Paraguay
- FINA code: PAR
- National federation: Federación Paraguaya de Deportes Acuáticos

in Doha, Qatar
- Competitors: 3 in 1 sport
- Medals: Gold 0 Silver 0 Bronze 0 Total 0

World Aquatics Championships appearances
- 1973; 1975; 1978; 1982; 1986; 1991; 1994; 1998; 2001; 2003; 2005; 2007; 2009; 2011; 2013; 2015; 2017; 2019; 2022; 2023; 2024

Paraguay competed at the 2024 World Aquatics Championships in Doha, Qatar from 2 to 18 February.

== Competitors ==
The following is the list of competitors in the Championships.

Sport	Men	Women	Total
Swimming	2	1	3
Total	2	1	3

== Swimming ==
Paraguay entered 3 swimmers.

Men

Athlete	Event	Heat		Semifinal		Final	
Athlete	Event	Time	Rank	Time	Rank	Time	Rank
Charles Hockin	50 metre backstroke	26.45	35	Did not advance			
Charles Hockin	100 metre backstroke	57.20	36	Did not advance			
Matheo Mateos	400 metre freestyle	4:04.14	42	—		Did not advance	

Women

Athlete	Event	Heat		Semifinal		Final	
Athlete	Event	Time	Rank	Time	Rank	Time	Rank
Luana Alonso	50 metre butterfly	28.06	35	Did not advance			
Luana Alonso	100 metre butterfly	1:02.33	30	Did not advance			
