= 2014 South American Swimming Championships =

XLII South American Swimming Championships
- Host city: Mar del Plata, Argentina
- Date(s): 2–5 October 2014
- Nations participating: 12
- Events: 40

The 42nd South American Swimming Championships were held from 2 to 5 October 2014 in Mar del Plata, Argentina.

== Participating countries ==
Countries which sent teams were:

- Argentina
- Bolivia
- Brazil
- Chile
- Colombia
- Ecuador
- Panama
- Paraguay
- Peru
- Suriname
- Uruguay
- Venezuela

== Results ==
=== Men's events ===
Event	Gold		Silver		Bronze	
50 m freestyle	Federico Grabich (ARG)	22.78	Matheus Santana (BRA)	23.16	Oliver Elliot (CHI)	23.20
100 m freestyle	Federico Grabich (ARG)	49.29	Matheus Santana (BRA)	50.06	Benjamin Hockin (PAR)	50.17
200 m freestyle	Benjamin Hockin (PAR)	1:48.80	Federico Grabich (ARG)	1:49.13 NR	Miguel Leite Valente (BRA)	1:51.56
400 m freestyle	Miguel Leite Valente (BRA)	3:52.46	Martin Naidich (ARG)	3:52.70	Juan Pereyra (ARG)	3:56.00
800 m freestyle	Esteban Enderica (ECU)	7:58.23 NR, CR	Martin Naidich (ARG)	7:58.70	Miguel Leite Valente (BRA)	7:59.47
1500 m freestyle	Esteban Enderica (ECU)	15:17.15 CR	Miguel Leite Valente (BRA)	15:17.59	Martin Naidich (ARG)	15:31.07
50 m backstroke	Guilherme Guido (BRA)	25.46	Fábio Santi (BRA)	25.56	Federico Grabich (ARG)	25.81
100 m backstroke	Federico Grabich (ARG)	55.15	Fábio Santi (BRA)	55.17	Fernando Ernesto Santos (BRA)	55.57
200 m backstroke	Fernando Ernesto Santos (BRA)	2:00.65	Matias Lopez Chaparro (PAR)	2:02.56	Charles Hockin (PAR)	2:04.73
50 m breaststroke	Felipe França (BRA)	27.82	João Luiz Gomes Júnior (BRA)	27.84	Facundo Miguelena (ARG)	28.59
100 m breaststroke	Felipe França (BRA)	1:01.26	João Luiz Gomes Júnior (BRA)	1:02.35	Facundo Miguelena (ARG)	1:02.41
200 m breaststroke	Felipe França (BRA)	2:13.99 CR	Thiago Simon (BRA)	2:15.32	Carlos Mahecha (COL)	2:15.37
50 m butterfly	Benjamin Hockin (PAR)	24.25	Guilherme Guido (BRA)	24.27	Marcos Macedo (BRA); Marcos Barale (ARG)	24.49
100 m butterfly	Marcos Macedo (BRA)	52.81	Mauricio Fiol (PER)	53.66	Esnaider Reales (COL)	53.92
200 m butterfly	Mauricio Fiol (PER)	2:00.50	Esnaider Reales (COL)	2:00.62	Gabriel Hernandez Carreno (VEN)	2:01.81
200 m I.M.	Henrique Rodrigues (BRA)	2:01.12	Thiago Simon (BRA)	2:02.05	Matias Lopez Chaparro (PAR)	2:07.51
400 m I.M.	Esteban Enderica (ECU)	4:21.91	Esteban Paz (ARG)	4:27.64 NR	Thiago Simon (BRA)	4:28.88
4×100 m freestyle relay	Argentina; Matias Aguilera (50.14); Guido Buscaglia (50.78); Joaquin Belza (50.48); Federico Grabich (48.37)	3:19.77 NR, CR	Brazil; Fernando Ernesto Santos (50.49); Matheus Santana (49.46); Marcos Macedo (49.83); Leonardo Alcover (50.48)	3:20.26	Paraguay; Charles Hockin (51.58); Matias Lopez Chaparro (-); Carlos Gianotti (-); Benjamin Hockin (49.08)	3:25.67
4×200 m freestyle relay	Argentina; Guido Buscaglia (1:52.67); Martin Naidich (1:51.39); Juan Pereyra (1:51.95); Federico Grabich (1:49.15)	7:25.16 NR, CR	Brazil; Thiago Simon (1:52.14); Miguel Valente (1:52.13); Henrique Rodrigues (1:51.19); Fernando Ernesto Santos (1:51.22)	7:26.68	Paraguay; Benjamin Hockin (1:49.06); Matias Lopez Chaparro (1:53.26); Maximiliano Abreu (1:57.35); Charles Hockin (1:53.00)	7:32.67 NR
4×100 m medley relay	Brazil; Guilherme Guido (54.91); Felipe França (1:00.22); Marcos Macedo (52.35); Matheus Santana (50.00)	3:37.48 CR	Argentina; Federico Grabich (55.30); Facundo Miguelena (1:02.15); Marcos Barale (53.83); Matias Aguilera (48.90)	3:40.18 NR	Colombia; Esnaider Reales (59.28); Carlos Mahecha (1:02.71); Angel David Hernandez (55.42); Julian Shepard (51.32)	3:48.73
Water Polo	Brazil	-	Argentina	-	Venezuela	-

Legend: CR – Championship record; NR – National record

=== Women's events ===
Event	Gold		Silver		Bronze	
50 m freestyle	Graciele Herrmann (BRA)	25.47	Alessandra Marchioro (BRA)	26.31	Aixa Triay (ARG)	26.42
100 m freestyle	Graciele Herrmann (BRA)	55.76	Larissa Oliveira (BRA)	55.81	Aixa Triay (ARG)	57.22
200 m freestyle	Manuella Lyrio (BRA)	2:01.06	Larissa Oliveira (BRA)	2:01.61	Andrea Cedrón (PER)	2:03.95
400 m freestyle	Samantha Arevalo (ECU)	4:13.48	Kristel Köbrich (CHI)	4:14.16	Cecilia Biagioli (ARG)	4:14.41
800 m freestyle	Samantha Arevalo (ECU)	8:36.59	Kristel Köbrich (CHI)	8:38.15	Cecilia Biagioli (ARG)	8:38.67
1500 m freestyle	Samantha Arevalo (ECU)	16:23.30 NR, CR	Kristel Köbrich (CHI)	16:31.89	Cecilia Biagioli (ARG)	16:35.55
50 m backstroke	Etiene Medeiros (BRA)	28.50	Andrea Berrino (ARG)	29.57	Natalia de Luccas (BRA)	29.79
100 m backstroke	Etiene Medeiros (BRA)	1:01.72	Natalia de Luccas (BRA)	1:02.85	Andrea Berrino (ARG)	1:03.33
200 m backstroke	Andrea Berrino (ARG)	2:13.93 NR, CR	Florencia Perotti (ARG)	2:16.67	Natalia de Luccas (BRA)	2:18.37
50 m breaststroke	Julia Sebastian (ARG)	31.82 NR, CR	Macarena Ceballos (ARG)	32.37	Beatriz Travalon (BRA)	32.40
100 m breaststroke	Macarena Ceballos (ARG)	1:09.83 CR	Julia Sebastian (ARG)	1:09.87	Beatriz Travalon (BRA)	1:11.88
200 m breaststroke	Julia Sebastian (ARG)	2:28.25 NR, CR	Macarena Ceballos (ARG)	2:36.09	Pâmela de Souza (BRA)	2:36.79
50 m butterfly	Daynara de Paula (BRA); Daniele de Jesus (BRA)	27.16	-	-	Maria Belen Diaz (ARG)	27.60 NR
100 m butterfly	Daynara de Paula (BRA)	59.76	Etiene Medeiros (BRA)	1:00.13	Maria Belen Diaz (ARG)	1:01.39
200 m butterfly	Virginia Bardach (ARG)	2:15.25	Julia Gerotto (BRA)	2:16.27	Nathália Almeida (BRA)	2:18.49
200 m I.M.	Virginia Bardach (ARG)	2:15.56 CR	Florencia Perotti (ARG)	2:18.30	Samantha Arevalo (ECU)	2:19.40
400 m I.M.	Virginia Bardach (ARG)	4:46.62	Samantha Arevalo (ECU)	4:48.68	Florencia Perotti (ARG)	4:48.88
4×100 m freestyle relay	Brazil; Larissa Oliveira (55.80); Graciele Herrmann (55.20); Daynara de Paula (57.31); Etiene Medeiros (59.09)	3:47.40	Argentina; Aixa Triay (57.20); Andrea Berrino (57.52); Maria Belen Diaz (58.29); Cecilia Biagioli (58.91)	3:51.92	Peru; Andrea Cedrón (59.21); Daniela Miyahara (59.40); Alejandra Campos (59.04); Jessica Paulista (58.72)	3:56.37
4×200 m freestyle relay	Brazil; Larissa Oliveira (2:02.96); Carolina Bilich (2:05.88); Nathália Almeida (2:04.27); Manuella Lyrio (2:01.68)	8:14.79	Argentina; Andrea Berrino (2:04.82); Virginia Bardach (2:03.16); Julia Arino (2:07.47); Cecilia Biagioli (2:05.92)	8:21.37 NR	Peru; Jessica Paulista (2:08.75); Alejandra Salinas (2:08.81); Andrea Cedrón (2:09.32); Erika Domin (2:07.31)	8:34.19 NR
4×100 m medley relay	Brazil; Etiene Medeiros (1:03.34); Beatriz Travalon (1:12.32); Daynara de Paula (59.48); Graciele Herrmann (55.27)	4:10.41 CR	Argentina; Andrea Berrino (1:02.68); Julia Sebastian (1:09.82); Maria Belen Diaz (1:02.09); Aixa Triay (56.09)	4:10.68 NR	Paraguay; Maria Arrua Villagra (1:08.32); Sofia López Chaparro (-); Nicole Maidana (-); Karen Riveros (58.07)	4:29.17 NR
Water Polo	Brazil	-	Venezuela	-	Argentina	-

Legend: CR – Championship record; NR – National record

=== Mixed events ===
Games	Gold		Silver		Bronze	
4×100 m freestyle relay	Brazil; Leonardo Alcover (51.14); Graciele Herrmann (56.86); Larissa Oliveira (55.93); Matheus Santana (49.95)	3:33.01; CR	Argentina; Matias Aguilera (50.48); Maria Belen Diaz (57.99); Aixa Triay (56.35); Federico Grabich (48.43)	3:33.25 NR	Peru; Paul Villacres (53.87); Andrea Cedrón (58.61); Jessica Paulista (58.48); Mauricio Fiol (51.43)	3:42.39 NR
4×100 m medley relay	Brazil; Etiene Medeiros (1:02.02); Felipe França (1:01.36); Daynara de Paula (59.75); Matheus Santana (49.52)	3:52.65 SA, CR	Argentina; Andrea Berrino (1:02.12) NR; Julia Sebastian (1:10.63); Marcos Barale (53.40); Federico Grabich (48.61)	3:54.76	Colombia; Maria Quintero Sosa (1:06.78); Carlos Mahecha (1:02.15); Ana Maria Quintero (1:04.40); Julian Shepard (51.07)	4:04.40

== Medal standings ==
Final medal standings for the 2014 South American Swimming Championships are:

* Host nation (Argentina)

Rank	Nation	Gold	Silver	Bronze	Total
1	Brazil (BRA)	22	18	11	51
2	Argentina (ARG)*	12	16	15	43
3	Ecuador (ECU)	6	1	1	8
4	Paraguay (PAR)	2	1	7	10
5	Peru (PER)	1	1	4	6
6	Chile (CHI)	0	3	1	4
7	Colombia (COL)	0	1	4	5
8	Venezuela (VEN)	0	0	1	1
Totals (8 entries)		43	41	44	128
