= Paraguay at the 2023 World Aquatics Championships =

- Flag of Paraguay
- FINA code: PAR
- National federation: Federación Paraguaya de Deportes Acuáticos

in Fukuoka, Japan
- Competitors: 4 in 1 sport
- Medals: Gold 0 Silver 0 Bronze 0 Total 0

World Aquatics Championships appearances
- 1973; 1975; 1978; 1982; 1986; 1991; 1994; 1998; 2001; 2003; 2005; 2007; 2009; 2011; 2013; 2015; 2017; 2019; 2022; 2023; 2024

Paraguay is set to compete at the 2023 World Aquatics Championships in Fukuoka, Japan from 14 to 30 July.

== Swimming ==
Paraguay entered 4 swimmers.

Men

Athlete	Event	Heat		Semifinal		Final	
Athlete	Event	Time	Rank	Time	Rank	Time	Rank
Ben Hockin	50 metre butterfly	24.34	51	Did not advance			
Ben Hockin	100 metre butterfly	54.69	49	Did not advance			
Charles Hockin	50 metre backstroke	25.96	36	Did not advance			
Charles Hockin	100 metre backstroke	56.56	39	Did not advance			
Matheo Mateos	200 metre freestyle	1:54.67	49	Did not advance			
Matheo Mateos	200 metre individual medley	Disqualified		Did not advance			

Women

Athlete	Event	Heat		Semifinal		Final	
Athlete	Event	Time	Rank	Time	Rank	Time	Rank
Luana Alonso	50 metre butterfly	28.13	38	Did not advance			
Luana Alonso	100 metre butterfly	1:01.16	33	Did not advance			
