= List of Paraguayan flags =

Flags of Paraguay

This is a list of flags used in Paraguay.

== National flag ==
Flag	Date	Use	Description
	2013–present	National flag (obverse and reverse)	A horizontal triband of red, white, and blue, defaced on the obverse with the national coat of arms.
	2013–present	National flag (obverse and reverse)	A horizontal triband of red, white, and blue, defaced on the reverse with the reversed national coat of arms.

== Presidential standard ==
Flag	Date	Use	Description
Current
	2013–present	Presidential standard of Paraguay	A blue field with four golden stars, one in each corner, and the coat of arms in the center.
Former
	1970s–2013	Presidential standard of Paraguay	A blue field with four golden stars, one in each corner, and the coat of arms in the center.
	?–1970s	Presidential standard of Paraguay	A blue field with four golden stars, one in each corner, and the coat of arms in the center.

== Military flag ==
=== Paraguayan Army ===
Flag	Date	Use	Description
Current
	?–present	Chief of General Staff	
	?–present	Commanding general	
	?–present	Division or brigade general	

=== Paraguay Navy ===
==== Jack ====
Flag	Date	Use	Description
Current
	1811–present	Naval jack of the Paraguayan Navy	A white field with a red and blue saltire and a white disc with a golden star in the center.

==== Rank flags ====
Flag	Date	Rank	Description
Current
	?–present	Minister of National Defense	
	?–present	Commander in Chief of the Paraguay Armed Forces	
	19th century – present (Note: In practice, not used, as a person with the rank of admiral holds the position of Commander in Chief of the Paraguay Armed Forces, and uses the flag of that position.)	Admiral	
	?–present	Vice admiral	
	?–present	Rear admiral	
	?–present	Captain commanding a naval force	
	?–present	Commander of a naval squadron	
	?–present	Commander and lieutenant-commander as a commander of group	
	?–present	Seniority pennant	
Former
	?–?	Minister of War and Navy	

==== Other ====
Flag	Date	Use	Description
Current
	19th century – present	War pennant	
	?–present	Flag of Naval Prefecture	
Former
	19th century	War pennant	

=== Paraguayan Air Force ===
Flag	Date	Use	Description
Current
	?–present	Flag of Paraguayan Air Force	
	?–present	Air Force commander	

== Police ==
Flag	Date	Use	Description
Current
	?–present	National Police of Paraguay	

== Civil ensign ==
Flag	Date	Use	Description
Former
	19th century	Merchant flag	

== First-level administrative divisions ==
Flag	Date	Administrative division	Description
	?–present	Alto Paraguay	A horizontal tricolor of red, white, and blue with the motto “force, life, prosperity” in the center.
	?–present	Alto Paraná	A vertical tricolor of green, white, and brown.
	?–present	Amambay	A red field with a white-edged green Nordic cross that extends to the edges; the vertical part of the cross is shifted to the hoist side.
	1961–present	Asunción	A horizontal triband of red, white, and red, with the department's arms in the center.
	?–present	Boquerón	A horizontal tricolor of blue, white, and green.
	?–present	Caaguazú	A horizontal tricolor of red, white, and blue, with five green stars arranged in a quincunx in the central band.
	?–present	Caazapá	The upper hoist quarter is white, the upper fly quarter is green and the entire lower half is red.
	?–present	Canindeyú	The top half is green, while the lower half is made of three horizontal stripes of blue, white, and red.
	?–present	Central	A white field with a red stripe and nineteen blue stars.
	?–present	Concepción	A diagonal bicolor of blue and white and a red stripe between.
	?–present	Cordillera	Two equal horizontal bands of white (top) and green with a red-edged blue isosceles triangle based on the hoist side, a golden twelve-pointed star inside the triangle and the department's arms in the center.
	?–present	Guairá	A horizontal bicolor of cyan and purple.
	?–present	Itapúa	A horizontal tricolor of green, white, and red, with the department's arms in the center.
	?–present	Misiones	A horizontal tricolor of yellow, white, and green separated by two narrow stripes of red and blue and the department's arms in the center.
	?–present	Ñeembucú	A horizontal tricolor of white, mint, and blue.
	?–present	Paraguarí	A white cross with the department's arms in the center that divides the flag into four rectangles, red and green at the top and green and red at the bottom.
	?–present	Presidente Hayes	A horizontal triband of green, white, and green.
	?–present	San Pedro	A vertical tricolor of blue, white, and green with the department's arms in the center.

== Historical flags ==
Flag	Date	Use	Description
National flags
	1970s–2013	Flag of the Republic of Paraguay (obverse and reverse)	A horizontal triband of red, white, and blue, defaced on the obverse with the national coat of arms.
	1970s–2013	Flag of the Republic of Paraguay (obverse and reverse)	A horizontal triband of red, white, and blue, defaced on the reverse with the reversed national coat of arms.
	1954–1970s	Flag of the Republic of Paraguay (obverse and reverse)	A horizontal triband of red, white, and blue, defaced on the obverse with the national coat of arms.
	1954–1970s	Flag of the Republic of Paraguay (obverse and reverse)	A horizontal triband of red, white, and blue, defaced on the reverse with the reversed national coat of arms.
	1842–1954	Flag of the Republic of Paraguay (obverse and reverse)	A horizontal triband of red, white, and blue, defaced on the obverse with the national coat of arms.
	1842–1954	Flag of the Republic of Paraguay (obverse and reverse)	A horizontal triband of red, white, and blue, defaced on the reverse with the reversed national coat of arms.
	1820s	Flag of the Republic of Paraguay (co-official)	
	1826–1842	Flag of the Republic of Paraguay (co-official)	A light blue field with a six-pointed white star in the canton.
	1812–1842	Flag of the Republic of Paraguay (co-official)	A horizontal tricolor of red, white, and blue.
	15 August – 30 September 1812	Flag of the Republic of Paraguay	A horizontal tricolor of red, white, and blue.
	August 1811 – 15 August 1812	Flag of Paraguay	A horizontal tricolor of red, yellow, and blue.
	17 June – August 1811	Flag of Paraguay	A horizontal tricolor of blue, yellow, and red with Spain's arms in the center.
	6 – 17 June 1811	Improvised revolutionary flag of Paraguay	A horizontal tricolor of green, white, and blue.
	15 May – 17 June 1811	Improvised revolutionary flag of Paraguay	A blue field with a six-pointed star in the canton.

== Ethnic group flags ==
Flag	Date	Ethnic group	Description
	?–present	Guaraní	A horizontal bicolour of red and green.

== Political flags ==
Flag	Date	Party	Description
Current
	2002–present	Free Homeland Party	
	1960s–present	Revolutionary Febrerista Party	
	19th century – present	Colorado Party	
	19th century – present	Liberal Party and Authentic Radical Liberal Party	
Former
	1992–2002	Free Homeland Movement	

=== Rebel groups flags ===
Flag	Date	Organization	Description
Current
	2010s–present	Armed Peasant Association	
	2008–present	Paraguayan People's Army	
Former
	1940s	Red Banner	

== Sporting flags ==
Flag	Date	Use	Description
Current
	2015–present	Paraguayan Football Association	
Former
	2004–2015	Paraguayan Football Association	

== Paraguayan shipping company ==
Flag	Date	Company	Description
Former
	?–?	State Merchant Fleet	

== Burgees of Paraguay ==
Flag	Club
	Yacht Club Ypacarai

== See also ==
- Flag of Paraguay
- Coat of arms of Paraguay
