= Andrea Cedrón =

Peruvian swimmer (born 1993)

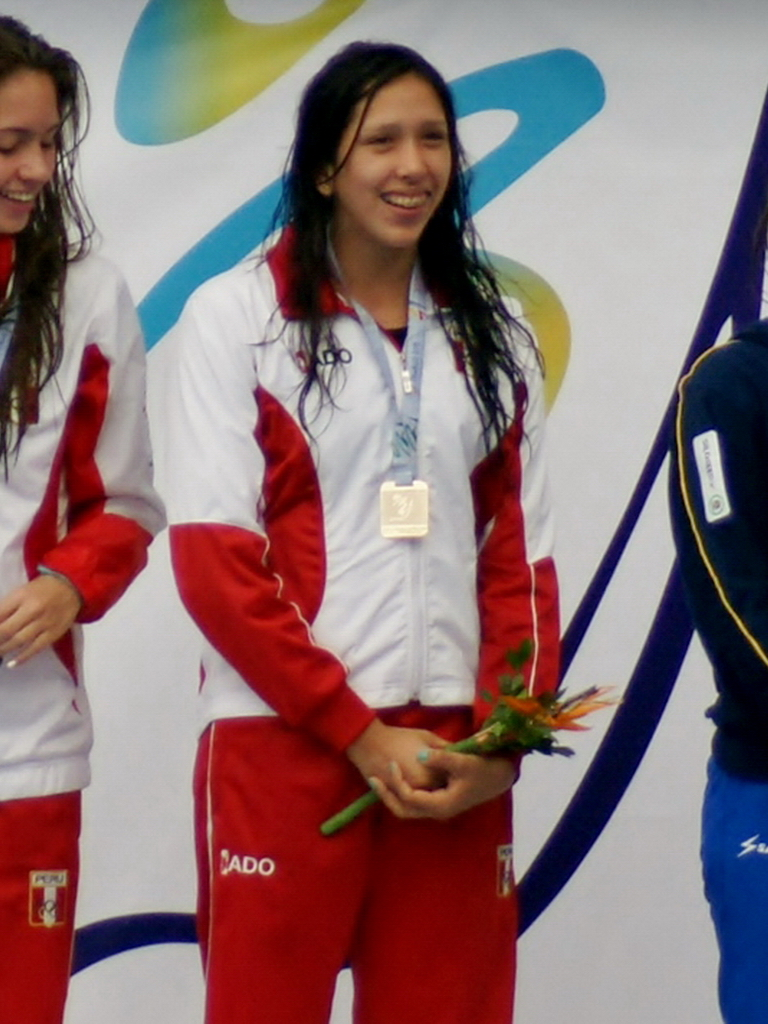

Personal information
- Full name: Andrea del Rosario Cedrón Rodríguez
- Born: December 24, 1993 (age 32) Trujillo, Peru
- Height: 1.69 m (5 ft 7 in)
- Weight: 62 kg (137 lb)

Sport
- Sport: Swimming
- Strokes: Freestyle
Medal record
Women's swimming
Representing Peru
South American Championships
Bronze medal – third place	2014 Mar del Plata	200 m free
Bronze medal – third place	2014 Mar del Plata	4x100 m free
Bronze medal – third place	2014 Mar del Plata	4x200 m free
Bronze medal – third place	2014 Mar del Plata	mix 4x100m free

Andrea of Rosario Cedrón Rodríguez (born 24 December 1993 in Trujillo, Peru) is a Peruvian professional swimmer. She was the only Peruvian swimmer in the Olympic games of London 2012. She also represented her country at the Olympic games of Rio de Janeiro 2016.

== Biography ==
Andrea is a daughter of Carlos Cedrón Medina and Jessenia Rodríguez Lescano. She has a sister named Gianella. She studied at the Institución Educativa Particular Inmaculada Virgen de La Puerta. She is known as "the Peruvian siren".

Cedrón has represented Peru worldwide competing in the Olympic games of London 2012 in the 400 metres free style, coming in the 33rd place.

She competed in the 2013 Bolivarian Games, in Trujillo, winning a total of six medals, three gold and three bronze.

Andrea holds the national record of 2:03.38 in the 200 metres freestyle, that allowed her classify for the 2015 Pan American Games, where she came in 7th place.

She participated in the 200 meter freestyle event at the 2016 Summer Olympics in Rio de Janeiro, taking the 39th place.
