= Silvia Di Pietro =

Italian swimmer (born 1993)

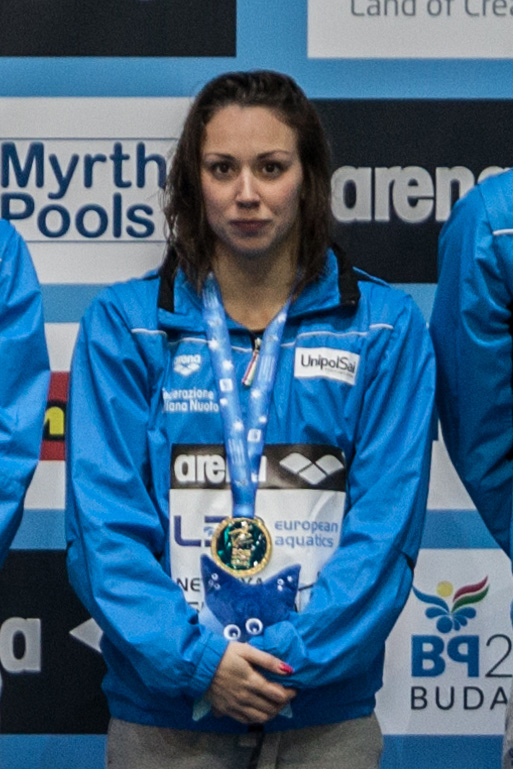
- Di Pietro at the 2015 European Short Course Swimming Championships in Netanya

Personal information
- Nationality: Italian
- Born: 6 April 1993 (age 33) Rome, Italy
- Height: 1.68 m (5 ft 6 in)
- Weight: 58 kg (128 lb)

Sport
- Country: Italy
- Sport: Swimming
- Club: Carabinieri Sports Centre
Medal record
Women's swimming
Representing Italy
World Championships (SC)
Gold medal – first place	2024 Budapest	4×50 m mixed freestyle
Silver medal – second place	2016 Windsor	50 m freestyle
Silver medal – second place	2016 Windsor	4×100 m freestyle
Silver medal – second place	2016 Windsor	4×50 m medley
Silver medal – second place	2022 Melbourne	4×50 m mixed medley
Bronze medal – third place	2014 Doha	4×100 m freestyle
Bronze medal – third place	2014 Doha	4×50 m mixed medley
Bronze medal – third place	2016 Windsor	4×50 m freestyle
Bronze medal – third place	2021 Abu Dhabi	4×50 m mixed medley
European Championships (LC)
Silver medal – second place	2012 Debrecen	4×100 m medley
Silver medal – second place	2016 London	4×100 m freestyle
Silver medal – second place	2022 Rome	4×100 m mixed medley
Bronze medal – third place	2020 Budapest	4×100 m medley
Bronze medal – third place	2020 Budapest	4×100 m mixed freestyle
Bronze medal – third place	2020 Budapest	4×100 m mixed medley
European Championships (SC)
Gold medal – first place	2015 Netanya	4×50 m freestyle
Gold medal – first place	2015 Netanya	4×50 m mixed freestyle
Gold medal – first place	2015 Netanya	4×50 m mixed medley
Gold medal – first place	2025 Lublin	4×50 m mixed freestyle
Gold medal – first place	2025 Lublin	4×50 m mixed medley
Silver medal – second place	2013 Herning	4×50 m mixed freestyle
Silver medal – second place	2019 Glasgow	4×50 m medley
Silver medal – second place	2025 Lublin	4×50 m freestyle
Bronze medal – third place	2008 Rijeka	4×50 m medley
Bronze medal – third place	2015 Netanya	50 m butterfly
Bronze medal – third place	2015 Netanya	4×50 m medley
Bronze medal – third place	2021 Kazan	4×50 m medley
Bronze medal – third place	2025 Lublin	4×50 m medley

Silvia Di Pietro (born 6 April 1993) is an Italian swimmer. She represented her country at the 2016 Summer Olympics.

Di Pietro is an athlete of the Centro Sportivo Carabinieri.
