= Seal of Paraguay =

Versions
- Reverse
- Armiger: Republic of Paraguay
- Adopted: 1825 (last change: 2013)
- Shield: Argent, mullet of five points Or surrounded by a palm branch proper dexter and an olive branch proper sinister, a Bordure of the field fimbriated Sable charged with name of State. Argent, lion Or in front of staff and Phrygian cap, a Bordure of the field fimbriated Sable charged with National Motto.
- Motto: REPÚBLICA DEL PARAGUAY "REPUBLIC OF PARAGUAY" PAZ Y JUSTICIA "PEACE AND JUSTICE"

The national seal of Paraguay (Spanish: Sello Nacional del Paraguay; Guarani: Paraguái Ha'erã'i) is the official seal of Paraguay.

== Description ==
The seal is on the central white stripe of the Paraguay national flag. The obverse of the arms features a round white background with the yellow five-pointed star surrounded by a palm branch to the left and an olive branch to the right both tied together surrounded by the name of the State: "REPÚBLICA DEL PARAGUAY" (Spanish for "REPUBLIC OF PARAGUAY"). The reverse of the arms features a golden lion in front of the staff and the Phrygian cap with the National Motto: "PAZ Y JUSTICIA" (Spanish for "PEACE AND JUSTICE").

The seal is prominently displayed on the reverse of the Paraguayan national flag, and the reverse of the seal is also used by the Supreme Court of Paraguay. The seal is featured alongside the obverse on banknotes of the Paraguayan national currency, the guaraní.

The first design of the seal dates to the year 1820, from the time of the dictatorship of Francia.

== 2013 redesign ==
On July 15, 2013, the Seal of Paraguay, and consequently the Paraguayan flag, were redesigned. The seal was simplified and the design was brought closer to its original design: the inscription "República del Paraguay", which was yellow with a red background, became black with a colourless background. In addition, the blue circle surrounding the yellow star was removed from the arms.

== Historical seals ==
(1826–1842)

(1842–1990, obverse)

(1842–1990, reverse)

(1990–2013, obverse)

(1990–2013, reverse)

== See also ==
- Flag of Paraguay
- Paraguay
