= Tang Yuting =

Chinese swimmer

Personal information
- Native name: 唐雨婷
- Nationality: Chinese
- Born: April 26, 1999 (age 27) Conghua, Guangzhou
- Height: 1.78 m (5 ft 10 in)
- Weight: 67 kg (148 lb)

Sport
- Country: China
- Sport: Swimming

Tang Yuting (Chinese: 唐雨婷; pinyin: Táng Yǔ Tíng; born 26 April 1999 in Conghua, Guangzhou) is a Chinese swimmer. At the 2015 World Championships in Kazan, Russia, Tang'group of four people took the 7th in the 4 × 100 m freestyle event at 3:37.64 in the final, 54.45 seconds by herself, thus qualifying her for the 2016 Summer Olympics in Rio de Janeiro.
