= Catharine Cooper =

Panamanian swimmer (born 1999)

Personal information
- Born: 3 December 1999 (age 26)

Sport
- Sport: Swimming

Catharine Cooper (born 3 December 1999) is a Panamanian swimmer. She competed in the women's 100 metre freestyle event at the 2017 World Aquatics Championships.

In 2019, she represented Panama at the World Aquatics Championships held in Gwangju, South Korea. She competed in the women's 50 metre freestyle and women's 100 metre freestyle events. In both events she did not advance to compete in the semi-finals.
