= Matías López =

Paraguayan swimmer (born 1996)

Personal information
- Full name: Matías Eduardo López Chaparro
- Nationality: Paraguayan
- Born: 29 January 1996 (age 30)

Sport
- Sport: Swimming
Medal record
Representing Paraguay
South American Games
Gold medal – first place	2018 Cochabamba	400m individual medley
Silver medal – second place	2014 Santiago	200m backstroke
Silver medal – second place	2018 Cochabamba	200m backstroke
Bronze medal – third place	2018 Cochabamba	200m individual medley
Bronze medal – third place	2022 Asuncion	200m backstroke

Matías López (born 29 January 1996) is a Paraguayan swimmer. He competed in the men's 200 metre backstroke event at the 2017 World Aquatics Championships.
