= Maria Arrua =

Paraguayan swimmer

Personal information
- Nationality: Paraguayan
- Born: 3 March 1999 (age 27)

Sport
- Sport: Swimming

Maria Arrua (born 3 March 1999) is a Paraguayan swimmer. She competed in the women's 50 metre backstroke at the 2019 World Aquatics Championships.
