= Barbora Mišendová =

Slovak swimmer (born 1998)

Personal information
- Born: 12 February 1998 (age 28)

Sport
- Sport: Swimming

Barbora Mišendová (born 12 February 1998) is a Slovak swimmer. She competed in the women's 100 metre butterfly event at the 2017 World Aquatics Championships.
