= Nicole Rautemberg =

Paraguayan swimmer

Personal information
- Born: 1 August 1999 (age 26)

Sport
- Sport: Swimming

Nicole Rautemberg (born 1 August 1999) is a Paraguayan swimmer. She competed in the women's 200 metre freestyle event at the 2017 World Aquatics Championships.
