= Flag of Paraguay =

Republic of Paraguay
- Use: National flag and ensign ≈
- Proportion: 11:20
- Adopted: 1842 (last modified July 15, 2013; 13 years ago)
- Design: A horizontal triband of red, white & blue, defaced on the obverse with the seal of Paraguay.
- Use: Reverse flag
- Proportion: 11:20
- Design: A horizontal triband of red, white and blue, defaced on the reverse with the reversed seal of Paraguay.

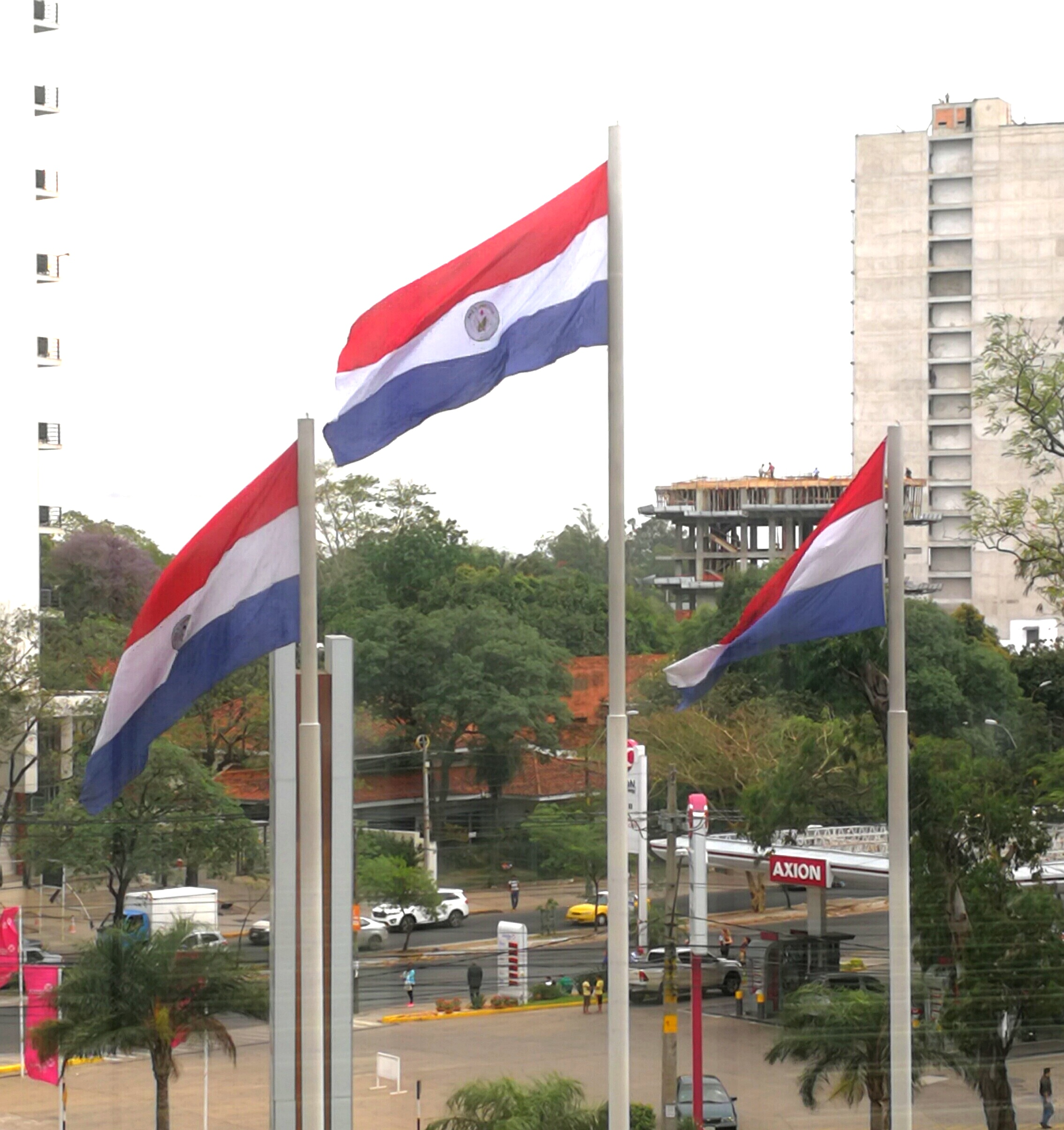
Three Paraguayan flags hoisted in a shopping mall in Asunción.

The flag of Paraguay (Spanish: bandera de Paraguay; Guarani: Paraguái poyvi) was first adopted in 1842. Its design, a red–white–blue triband, was inspired by the colours of the French Tricolour, believed to signify independence and liberty. The flag is unusual because it differs on its obverse and reverse sides: the obverse of the flag shows the national seal, and the reverse shows the seal of the treasury. It is the only national flag worldwide that has a unique design on each side. The flag consists of the same three horizontal colours as the flag of the Netherlands, which in turn was the inspiration for the French flag. It was revised in 2013 to bring the flag towards its original design. It has a ratio of 11:20.

Prior to the current design, the country used two other designs: a similar one with no seal where the white stripe was slightly larger than the other two (1812–1826), and a different simple design featuring a blue field and a six-pointed white star in the upper-left corner (1826–1842).

== Symbolism and design ==
Officially adopted in 1842 (following the Recomendación, i.e.: address, of the Junta gubernativa de Asunción), each side of this tricolour flag contains a horizontal tricolor of red, white and blue with the national emblem centered on the white band. The colours of the flag are believed to be inspired from the flag of France to show independence and liberty, and the seal represents the independence of Paraguay.

- The emblem on the obverse side is the national seal of Paraguay: a yellow five-pointed star surrounded by a green wreath of palm and olive leaves tied with ribbons of the colour of the stripes, and capped by the words REPUBLICA DEL PARAGUAY ("Republic of Paraguay" in Spanish), all within two concentric circles).
- The emblem on the reverse side is the seal of the treasury: a yellow lion below a red Phrygian cap on the top of a pole (symbolising courage) and the words Paz y Justicia ("Peace and Justice").

The differences in the obverse and reverse sides comes from the period when José de Francia was in power (1814–1840).

=== Colors ===
The 2013 statute that defines the flag does not specify colors for the red and blue stripes, merely stating, "The red colour, as well as the blue colour, shall be kept as so-called 'primary colours,' that is, without admixture with other colours."

Colors here are from SeekFlag, but other specifications have been used.

Paraguay Paraguay	Red	White	Blue
RGB	213-43-30	255-255-255	0-56-168
Hexadecimal	#d52b1e	#FFFFFF	#0038a8
CMYK	0, 80, 86, 16	0, 0, 0, 0	100, 67, 0, 34

Colors of the Seal are specified in the Appendix of Decree No. 11,400 (July 15, 2013).

	Pantone	RGB	HEX	CMYK
Red	PMS 485 C	237, 28, 36	#ED1C24	0, 100, 100, 0
Yellow	PMS Yellow C	255, 241, 8	#FFF108	0, 0, 100, 0
Green	PMS 355C	0, 166, 81	#00A651	100, 10, 100, 0
Brown	PMS 478C	136, 83,33	#885321	40, 65, 100, 0
Khaki	PMS 4505C	178, 163, 54	#B2A336	35, 30, 100, 0
Black	PMS Black C	0, 0, 0	#000000	0, 0, 0, 100

== History ==
=== Revolutionary flags ===
15 May–16 June 1811

6–17 June 1811

17 June–August 1811

August 1811–15 August 1812

15 August–30 September 1812

The first flags used in the territory of modern Argentina were those associated with the Spanish crown. The last formally used Spanish flag was a red and yellow one, established by King Charles III in 1785 and used mainly for naval and military purposes. The first Paraguayan flag was raised on 15 May 1811, in Asunción, the day after the May Revolution. It was a solid blue flag with a white six-pointed star in the canton. The blue color symbolized Our Lady of the Assumption, from whom the capital of Paraguay is named.

This flag was used for less than a month before Governor Bernardo de Velasco was removed from office on 9 June. From 6 June 1811, some officials began to introduce an informal flag in green, white, and blue, with equally proportional horizontal stripes. The First General Congress, appointed on 17 June, began using flags with blue, yellow and red stripes. The colors were chosen as a combination of the local blue with the colors of Spain, as the newly-instated Superior Governing Junta was still trying to maintain loyalty to Ferdinand VII, who was at the time a prisoner of Napoleon. Initially, the Spanish coat of arms also appears on the flag, but later descriptions do not mention it.

The flag was changed again on 15 August 1812, to a red, white, and blue tricolor, with the central white stripe wider than the red and blue stripes. Created by the First Supreme Ruling Junta (which included May Revolution heroes Fulgencio Yegros, Fernando de la Mora, and Pedro Juan Caballero), this flag remained in use until 30 September, when the stripes were aligned.

=== Doctor Francia era ===
1812–1842

1826–1842

1820s

The tricolor flag without the emblem is called the first flag of the Republic because it was in force when Paraguay was declared a republic at the Second National Congress held in 1813. In 1826, the perpetual dictator José Gaspar Rodríguez de Francia restored the May 1811 flag, but with a light blue tint. The blue flag was used alongside the tricolor. In the 1820s, a flag with vertical stripes was also used. The vertical flag is sometimes considered an expression of de Francia's sympathy for the French Revolution and the Tricolore, which was not the national flag of France at the time.

=== Current flag ===
Ratio: 2:3 (1842–1957)

Ratio: 1:2 (1957–1970s)

Ratio: 27:50 (1970s–2013)
(1842–1954, reverse)

(1957–1970s, reverse)

(1970s–2013, reverse)

On 25 November 1842, on the same day, formal declarations of independence were also issued, when Carlos Antonio López and Mariano Roque Alonso were in power in the country, the Congress unified the flags as a horizontal red, white and blue tricolor. Additionally, the new national emblem is placed in the center of the flag on the obverse and the seal of the treasury on the reverse. The details of the seal were not determined at that time, but the overall design of the flag remained unchanged except for the proportions. During the dictatorship of Alfredo Stroessner in the 1970s or 1980s, the design by Harold Theodor Ronnebeck began to be informally used as the basic seal design.

On 15 July 2013, President Federico Franco presented a project for a standardized seal and thus a flag. The seal was simplified and the design was brought closer to the forms used in the 19th century: the inscription “República del Paraguay”, which was yellow with a red background, became black with a colorless background. In addition, the blue circle surrounding the yellow star disappeared.

== See also ==
- Seal of Paraguay
- Flags whose reverse differs from the obverse
- List of Paraguayan flags
