= Karen Riveros =

Paraguayan swimmer

Personal information
- Full name: Karen Nathalia Riveros Schulz
- Nationality: PAR
- Born: December 4, 1994 (age 31) Asunción, Paraguay
- Height: 1.63 m (5 ft 4 in)
- Weight: 60 kg (132 lb)

Sport
- Sport: Swimming
- Strokes: Freestyle
Medal record
Women's swimming
Representing Paraguay
South American Championships
Bronze medal – third place	2014 Mar del Plata	4x100 m medley

Karen Nathalia Riveros Schulz is a Paraguayan swimmer. At the 2012 Summer Olympics, she competed in the Women's 100 metre freestyle, finishing in 41st place overall in the heats, failing to qualify for the semifinals.
