= Charles Hockin =

Paraguayan swimmer (born 1989)

Personal information
- Full name: Charles Daniel Hockin Brusquetti
- Born: 4 November 1989 (age 36) Tenerife, Spain

Sport
- Sport: Swimming
- Club: Club Deportivo de Puerto Sajon
- College team: Loughborough University
Medal record
Representing Paraguay
South American Games
Bronze medal – third place	2018 Cochabamba	100 m backstroke
South American Championships
Silver medal – second place	2018 Trujillo	50 m backstroke
Silver medal – second place	2021 Buenos Aires	50 m backstroke
Bronze medal – third place	2014 Mar del Plata	200 m backstroke
Bronze medal – third place	2014 Mar del Plata	4×100 m freestyle
Bronze medal – third place	2014 Mar del Plata	4×200 m freestyle
Bronze medal – third place	2018 Trujillo	200 m backstroke
Bolivarian Games
Silver medal – second place	2017 Santa Marta	100 m backstroke
Silver medal – second place	2017 Santa Marta	200 m backstroke
Silver medal – second place	2022 Valledupar	4×100 m mixed medley
Bronze medal – third place	2017 Santa Marta	4×100 m freestyle
Bronze medal – third place	2017 Santa Marta	4×100 m medley
Bronze medal – third place	2022 Valledupar	4×100 m medley

Charles Daniel Hockin Brusquetti (born 4 November 1989) is a swimmer. Born in Spain, he represents Paraguay internationally. He competed in the men's 50 metre backstroke event at the 2017 World Aquatics Championships.
