= 2014 FINA World Swimming Championships (25 m) – Men's 400 metre freestyle =

Men's 400 metre freestyle at the 2014 FINA World Swimming Championships (25 m)
- Dates: 5 December (heats and semifinals); 6 December (final)
- Competitors: 80 from 63 nations
- Winning time: 3:34.32

Medalists
gold medal	Péter Bernek	Hungary
silver medal	James Guy	Great Britain
bronze medal	Velimir Stjepanović	Serbia

The Men's 400 metre freestyle competition of the 2014 FINA World Swimming Championships (25 m) was held on 5 December with the heats and the semifinals and 6 December with the final.

== Records ==
Prior to the competition, the existing world and championship records were as follows.

	Name	Nation	Time	Location	Date
World record	Yannick Agnel	France	3:32.25	Angers	15 November 2012
Championship record	Grant Hackett	Australia	3:35.01	Hong Kong	1 April 1999

The following records were established during the competition:

Date	Event	Name	Nation	Time	Record
5 December	Final	Péter Bernek	Hungary	3:34.32	CR

== Results ==
=== Heats ===
The Heats were held at 11:13.

Rank	Heat	Lane	Name	Nationality	Time	Notes
1	8	5	Péter Bernek	Hungary	3:37.34	Q
2	7	3	Ryan Cochrane	Canada	3:39.55	Q
3	8	6	James Guy	Great Britain	3:39.58	Q
4	8	4	Jordan Harrison	Australia	3:39.67	Q
5	8	3	Daniel Smith	Australia	3:40.12	Q
6	9	1	Mads Glæsner	Denmark	3:40.28	Q
7	9	4	Velimir Stjepanović	Serbia	3:40.30	Q
8	9	9	Oussama Mellouli	Tunisia	3:40.51	Q
9	9	6	Andrea Mitchell D'Arrigo	Italy	3:40.60	
10	9	2	Michael McBroom	United States	3:40.73	
11	9	3	Myles Brown	South Africa	3:41.09	
12	5	8	Cristian Quintero	Venezuela	3:41.67	SA
13	9	5	Clemens Rapp	Germany	3:41.90	
14	8	2	Matt McLean	United States	3:41.92	
15	9	8	Anders Lie	Denmark	3:41.95	
16	8	7	Gabriele Detti	Italy	3:42.15	
17	7	9	Pál Joensen	Faroe Islands	3:42.31	
18	6	4	Henrik Christiansen	Norway	3:42.75	
19	8	8	Florian Vogel	Germany	3:42.76	
20	6	3	Jan Micka	Czech Republic	3:43.50	
21	7	7	Richárd Nagy	Slovakia	3:43.51	
22	9	0	Yuki Kobori	Japan	3:43.81	
23	7	4	David Brandl	Austria	3:44.07	
24	7	0	Martin Bau	Slovenia	3:44.21	
25	9	7	Ahmed Mathlouthi	Tunisia	3:44.48	
26	6	7	Tsubasa Amai	Japan	3:44.92	
27	6	2	Felix Auböck	Austria	3:44.93	
28	7	1	Gergely Gyurta	Hungary	3:45.07	
29	8	0	Filip Zaborowski	Poland	3:45.09	
30	7	8	Vuk Čelić	Serbia	3:45.52	
31	6	0	Qiu Ziao	China	3:45.54	
32	6	1	Nezır Karap	Turkey	3:45.66	
33	7	5	Serhiy Frolov	Ukraine	3:45.94	
34	7	6	Nathan Capp	New Zealand	3:46.19	
35	4	4	Gabriel Ogawa	Brazil	3:46.94	
36	8	1	Aleksandr Krasnykh	Russia	3:47.53	
37	5	6	Martín Naidich	Argentina	3:47.63	
38	5	1	Jiang Yuhui	China	3:47.92	
39	6	9	Andrés Olvera	Mexico	3:48.19	
40	5	9	Calvyn Justus	South Africa	3:48.73	
41	5	7	Ensar Hajder	Bosnia and Herzegovina	3:49.08	
42	6	6	Glenn Surgeloose	Belgium	3:49.45	
43	5	5	Esteban Enderica	Ecuador	3:50.21	
44	6	8	Povilas Strazdas	Lithuania	3:50.25	
45	5	4	Irakli Revishvili	Georgia	3:50.83	
46	4	5	Pedro Pinotes	Angola	3:50.98	
47	5	0	Sven Saemundsson	Croatia	3:51.41	
48	5	3	Jan Kutnik	Czech Republic	3:51.84	
49	4	9	Fahad Al-Khaldi	Philippines	3:52.02	
50	4	6	Oli Mortensen	Faroe Islands	3:52.16	
51	7	2	Marcelo Acosta	El Salvador	3:53.11	
52	5	2	Kristofer Sigurðsson	Iceland	3:53.43	
53	4	3	Daniel Pálsson	Iceland	3:57.25	
54	4	0	Khader Baqlah	Jordan	3:57.71	
55	3	5	Cho Cheng-chi	Chinese Taipei	3:58.61	
56	4	8	Khurshidjon Tursunov	Uzbekistan	3:58.73	
57	4	2	Imadeddine Tchouar	Algeria	4:00.04	
58	3	1	Pol Arias	Andorra	4:00.70	
59	4	7	Jésus Monge	Peru	4:00.75	
60	3	3	Mark Burnley	Curaçao	4:01.12	
61	3	0	Eric Culver	Puerto Rico	4:01.31	
62	2	6	Jean Monteagudo	Peru	4:01.62	
63	3	8	Patrick Groters	Aruba	4:01.12	
64	4	1	Geoffrey Butler	Cayman Islands	4:03.48	
65	2	4	Axel Ngui	Philippines	4:03.95	
66	3	2	Mathieu Marquet	Mauritius	4:04.95	
67	3	6	Noah Mascoll-Gomes	Antigua and Barbuda	4:05.32	
68	3	4	Klavio Meça	Albania	4:07.24	
69	3	7	Sanu Debnath	India	4:07.77	
70	2	5	Said Saber	Morocco	4:08.06	
71	2	3	Alex Sobers	Barbados	4:08.54	
72	3	9	Yousef Al-Lowghani	Kuwait	4:09.15	
73	2	1	Arian Oliaei	Iran	4:12.46	
74	2	7	Franci Aleksi	Albania	4:12.85	
75	2	8	Karl Pardo	Gibraltar	4:14.40	
76	2	0	Brandon Schuster	Samoa	4:20.35	
77	2	2	Guillermo López	Nicaragua	4:20.41	
78	1	3	Sheldon Plummer	Papua New Guinea	4:30.83	
79	1	4	Tommy Imazu	Guam	4:31.03	
80	1	5	Htut Ahnt Khaung	Myanmar	4:36.38	
—	6	5	Clément Mignon	France		DNS
—	8	9	Mikhail Polischuk	Russia		DNS

=== Final ===
The final was held at 18:55.

Rank	Lane	Name	Nationality	Time	Notes
1st place, gold medalist(s)	4	Péter Bernek	Hungary	3:34.32	CR
2nd place, silver medalist(s)	3	James Guy	Great Britain	3:36.35	
3rd place, bronze medalist(s)	1	Velimir Stjepanović	Serbia	3:38.17	
4	8	Oussama Mellouli	Tunisia	3:39.05	
5	6	Jordan Harrison	Australia	3:39.11	
6	5	Ryan Cochrane	Canada	3:39.29	
7	7	Mads Glæsner	Denmark	3:39.55	
8	2	Daniel Smith	Australia	3:39.63	
