= Swimming at the 2014 European Aquatics Championships – Men's 800 metre freestyle =

Men's 800 Metre Freestyle at the Swimming at the 2014 European Aquatics Championships
- Dates: 21–22 August 2014
- Competitors: 35 from 20 nations
- Winning time: 7:44.98

Medalists
gold medal	Gregorio Paltrinieri	Italy
silver medal	Pál Joensen	Faroe Islands
bronze medal	Gabriele Detti	Italy

The Men's 800 metre freestyle competition of the 2014 European Aquatics Championships was held on 21–22 August 2014.

== Records ==
Prior to the competition, the existing world, European and championship records were as follows.

	Name	Nation	Time	Location	Date
World record	Zhang Lin	China	7:32.12	Rome	29 July 2009
European record	Gabriele Detti	Italy	7:42.74	Riccione	8 April 2014
Championship record	Sebastien Rouault	France	7:48.28	Budapest	13 August 2010

== Results ==
=== Heats ===
The heats were held at 10.16.

Rank	Heat	Lane	Name	Nationality	Time	Notes
1	4	5	Pál Joensen	Faroe Islands	7:53.09	Q
2	4	7	Jan Micka	Czech Republic	7:53.38	Q
3	4	4	Gabriele Detti	Italy	7:53.51	Q
4	4	3	Gergely Gyurta	Hungary	7:55.34	Q
5	3	4	Gregorio Paltrinieri	Italy	7:55.35	Q
6	3	9	Stephen Milne	Great Britain	7:56.40	Q
7	2	4	Richárd Nagy	Slovakia	7:56.74	Q
8	3	7	Ferry Weertman	Netherlands	7:57.80	Q
9	2	5	Anton Ipsen	Denmark	7:58.17	
10	3	0	Florian Vogel	Germany	7:58.34	
11	3	5	Serhiy Frolov	Ukraine	7:58.55	
12	3	3	Marc Sánchez	Spain	7:58.66	
13	2	3	Maarten Brzoskowski	Netherlands	7:58.82	
14	4	2	Filip Zaborowski	Poland	7:58.99	
15	1	4	Martin Bau	Slovenia	7:59.76	
16	3	6	Sören Meiβner	Germany	8:01.65	
17	3	1	Joris Bouchault	France	8:02.89	
18	3	2	Anthony Pannier	France	8:03.00	
19	4	6	Matias Koski	Finland	8:05.07	
20	4	8	Damien Joly	France	8:05.29	
21	4	1	Gergő Kis	Hungary	8:06.14	
22	2	0	Maksim Shemberyev	Ukraine	8:06.78	
23	2	8	Nezir Karap	Turkey	8:08.05	
24	1	3	Jan Kutník	Czech Republic	8:10.48	
25	2	2	David Brandl	Austria	8:10.66	
26	1	5	Lukas Ambros	Austria	8:11.71	
27	3	8	Pawel Furtek	Poland	8:12.50	
28	4	9	Axel Reymond	France	8:12.81	
29	2	9	Eetu Piiroinen	Finland	8:13.11	
30	2	1	Anton Goncharov	Ukraine	8:13.67	
31	1	2	Adam Paulsson	Sweden	8:19.29	
32	1	6	Tomás Novovesky	Czech Republic	8:20.70	
33	2	6	Ediz Yıldırımer	Turkey	8:21.41	
34	2	7	Uladzimir Zhyharau	Belarus	8:23.95	
35	1	7	Pit Brandenburger	Luxembourg	8:33.16	
—	4	0	Mads Glæsner	Denmark		DNS

=== Final ===
The final was held at 18:07.

Rank	Lane	Name	Nationality	Time	Notes
1st place, gold medalist(s)	2	Gregorio Paltrinieri	Italy	7:44.98	CR
2nd place, silver medalist(s)	4	Pál Joensen	Faroe Islands	7:48.49	
3rd place, bronze medalist(s)	3	Gabriele Detti	Italy	7:49.35	
4	7	Stephen Milne	Great Britain	7:50.64	
5	5	Jan Micka	Czech Republic	7:52.19	
6	6	Gergely Gyurta	Hungary	7:55.47	
7	8	Ferry Weertman	Netherlands	7:55.57	
8	1	Richárd Nagy	Slovakia	7:56.28	
