= 2012 FINA World Swimming Championships (25 m) – Men's 1500 metre freestyle =

Timed finals

Men's 1500m Freestyle at the 2012 Short Course Worlds
- Dates: 16 December
- Winning time: 14:30.01

Medalists
| gold medal | Mads Glæsner | Denmark |
| silver medal | Gregorio Paltrinieri | Italy |
| bronze medal | Pál Joensen | Faroe Islands |

The men's 1500 metre freestyle event at the 11th FINA World Swimming Championships (25m) took place 16 December 2012 at the Sinan Erdem Dome. This event was a timed-final where each swimmer swam just once. The top 8 seeded swimmers swam in the evening, and the remaining swimmers swam in the morning session.

In June 2013, Danish swimmer Mads Glæsner was stripped of the gold medal after testing positive for levomethamphetamine following the 400 m freestyle final.

However, upon appeal to the Court of Arbitration for Sport, Glaesner's gold medal was reinstated as a separate test after the race did not contain the prohibited substance.

== Records ==
Prior to this competition, the existing world and championship records were as follows.

| | Name | Nation | Time | Location | Date |
|---|---|---|---|---|---|
| World record | Grant Hackett | Australia | 14:10.10 | Perth | 7 August 2001 |
| Championship record | Yury Prilukov | Russia | 14:22.98 | Manchester | 13 April 2008 |

No new records were set during this competition.

== Results ==
| Rank | Heat | Lane | Name | Nationality | Time | Notes |
|---|---|---|---|---|---|---|
| 1st place, gold medalist(s) | 5 | 3 | Mads Glæsner | Denmark | 14:30.01 | |
| 2nd place, silver medalist(s) | 5 | 4 | Gregorio Paltrinieri | Italy | 14:31.13 | |
| 3rd place, bronze medalist(s) | 5 | 2 | Pál Joensen | Faroe Islands | 14:36.93 | |
| 4 | 5 | 5 | Mateusz Sawrymowicz | Poland | 14:38.29 | |
| 5 | 4 | 5 | Matthew Levings | Australia | 14:40.05 | |
| 6 | 3 | 2 | Ryan Feeley | United States | 14:40.06 | |
| 7 | 5 | 1 | Yohei Takiguchi | Japan | 14:40.16 | |
| 8 | 5 | 8 | Jordan Harrison | Australia | 14:43.62 | |
| 9 | 4 | 2 | Kohei Yamamoto | Japan | 14:43.98 | |
| 10 | 3 | 6 | Michael McBroom | United States | 14:44.11 | |
| 11 | 4 | 3 | Gergely Gyurta | Hungary | 14:45.83 | |
| 12 | 4 | 4 | Gabriele Detti | Italy | 14:49.29 | |
| 13 | 1 | 6 | Hao Yun | China | 14:51.03 | |
| 14 | 5 | 7 | Anthony Pannier | France | 14:51.66 | |
| 15 | 4 | 7 | Devon Myles Brown | South Africa | 14:54.46 | |
| 16 | 4 | 9 | Daniel Fogg | Great Britain | 14:54.97 | |
| 17 | 5 | 6 | Serhiy Frolov | Ukraine | 14:57.08 | |
| 18 | 4 | 8 | Maksym Shemberev | Ukraine | 14:58.08 | |
| 19 | 3 | 1 | Esteban Enderica | Ecuador | 14:59.67 | NR |
| 20 | 3 | 7 | Anton Sveinn McKee | Iceland | 15:00.51 | NR |
| 21 | 3 | 3 | Uladzimir Zhyharau | Belarus | 15:05.49 | |
| 22 | 2 | 3 | Ediz Yıldırımer | Turkey | 15:07.60 | NR |
| 23 | 4 | 0 | Richárd Nagy | Slovakia | 15:08.17 | |
| 24 | 4 | 1 | Karol Zaczynski | Poland | 15:11.17 | |
| 25 | 4 | 6 | Patrik Rakos | Hungary | 15:15.57 | |
| 26 | 3 | 4 | Matthew Stanley | New Zealand | 15:17.20 | |
| 27 | 1 | 2 | Dominik Meichtry | Switzerland | 15:17.66 | |
| 28 | 2 | 4 | Zackariah Chetrat | Canada | 15:18.22 | |
| 29 | 3 | 8 | Alexander Selin | Russia | 15:28.13 | |
| 30 | 3 | 0 | Esteban Paz | Argentina | 15:28.34 | |
| 31 | 2 | 5 | Arturo Pérez Vertti | Mexico | 15:29.34 | |
| 32 | 1 | 7 | Pu Wenjie | China | 15:30.02 | |
| 33 | 3 | 9 | Pang Sheng Jun | Singapore | 15:31.73 | |
| 34 | 3 | 5 | Martin Naidich | Argentina | 15:37.00 | |
| 35 | 1 | 3 | Ensar Hajder | Bosnia and Herzegovina | 15:37.26 | NR |
| 36 | 2 | 2 | Christoph Meier | Liechtenstein | 15:39.38 | NR |
| 37 | 2 | 0 | Marcelo Alberto Acosta Jimenez | El Salvador | 15:46.26 | |
| 38 | 2 | 6 | Yeziel Morales | Puerto Rico | 15:47.43 | |
| 39 | 2 | 1 | Jesus Monge | Peru | 15:52.51 | |
| 40 | 2 | 9 | Christian Selby | Barbados | 16:09.22 | NR |
| 41 | 1 | 1 | Robert Renwick | Great Britain | 16:10.93 | |
| 42 | 2 | 8 | Sobitjon Amilov | Uzbekistan | 16:15.27 | |
| 43 | 2 | 7 | Iacovos Hadjiconstantinou | Cyprus | 16:27.41 | |
| 44 | 1 | 4 | Khader Baqleh | Jordan | 16:42.64 | |
| —N/a | 1 | 5 | Alejandro Gómez | Venezuela | | DNS |
