= Swimming at the 2016 Summer Olympics – Men's 1500 metre freestyle =

Men's 1500 metre freestyle at the Games of the XXXI Olympiad
- Venue: Olympic Aquatics Stadium
- Dates: 12 August 2016 (heats); 13 August 2016 (final)
- Competitors: 46 from 32 nations
- Winning time: 14:34.57

Medalists
1st place, gold medalist(s)		Gregorio Paltrinieri	Italy
2nd place, silver medalist(s)		Connor Jaeger	United States
3rd place, bronze medalist(s)		Gabriele Detti	Italy

The men's 1500 metre freestyle event at the 2016 Summer Olympics took place on 12–13 August at the Olympic Aquatics Stadium.

== Summary ==
Italian swimmer and 2015 world champion Gregorio Paltrinieri outlasted the field on the closing stages to become his country's first ever Olympic champion in the program's longest pool race. Strengthening his lead from start to finish, Paltrinieri headed into the 1,400-metre turn under a world-record pace, but fell off towards the end for the gold medal in 14:34.57. U.S. distance ace Connor Jaeger overhauled the sub-14:40 barrier with an American record of 14:39.48 for the silver. Meanwhile, Paltrinieri's countryman Gabriele Detti gave the Italians a further reason to celebrate, as he powered home with a bronze in 14:40.86, overtaking the American challenger Jordan Wilimovsky (14:45.03) by almost five seconds.

Australia's Mack Horton, who claimed the 400 m freestyle title on night one, picked up the fifth spot with a 14:49.54 to hold off a sprint race from Canada's Ryan Cochrane (14:49.61), two-time medalist in this event, by seven hundredths of a second. France's Damien Joly finished seventh in 14:52.73, with Norway's Henrik Christiansen (15:02.66) rounding out the top eight field.

China's world-record holder Sun Yang missed a chance to defend his Olympic title in this event, after posting the sixteenth fastest time (15:01.97) in the preliminary competition. Meanwhile, Tunisian swimmer and Beijing 2008 champion Oussama Mellouli failed to advance to the top eight final with a twenty-first-place finish in his fifth Olympic appearance.

== Records ==
World record	Sun Yang (CHN)	14:31.02	London, United Kingdom	4 August 2012
Olympic record	Sun Yang (CHN)	14:31.02	London, United Kingdom	4 August 2012

== Competition format ==
The competition consisted of two rounds: heats and a final. The swimmers with the best 8 times in the heats advanced to the final. Swim-offs were used as necessary to break ties for advancement to the next round.

== Results ==
=== Heats ===
Rank	Heat	Lane	Name	Nationality	Time	Notes
1	6	4	Gregorio Paltrinieri	Italy	14:44.51	Q
2	6	5	Connor Jaeger	United States	14:45.74	Q
3	5	3	Jordan Wilimovsky	United States	14:48.23	Q
4	5	4	Mack Horton	Australia	14:48.57	Q
5	5	5	Gabriele Detti	Italy	14:48.68	Q
6	5	8	Damien Joly	France	14:48.90	Q, NR
7	5	6	Ryan Cochrane	Canada	14:53.44	Q
8	5	2	Henrik Christiansen	Norway	14:55.40	Q, NR
9	6	3	Jack McLoughlin	Australia	14:56.02	
10	6	1	Stephen Milne	Great Britain	14:57.23	
11	6	2	Ahmed Akram	Egypt	14:58.37	
12	4	3	Jan Micka	Czech Republic	14:58.69	
13	2	4	Ilya Druzhinin	Russia	14:59.56	
14	4	1	Yaroslav Potapov	Russia	15:00.99	
15	6	6	Mykhailo Romanchuk	Ukraine	15:01.35	
16	5	7	Sun Yang	China	15:01.97	
17	4	7	Serhiy Frolov	Ukraine	15:04.61	
18	3	5	Anton Ipsen	Denmark	15:05.91	
19	6	7	Gergely Gyurta	Hungary	15:06.24	
20	4	4	Qiu Ziao	China	15:06.71	
21	1	4	Oussama Mellouli	Tunisia	15:07.78	
22	2	6	Marcelo Acosta	El Salvador	15:08.17	NR
23	3	2	Esteban Enderica	Ecuador	15:10.15	
24	3	7	Marc Sánchez	Spain	15:11.38	
25	2	2	Ricardo Vargas	Mexico	15:11.53	NR
26	3	3	Antonio Arroyo	Spain	15:12.61	
27	5	1	Timothy Shuttleworth	Great Britain	15:13.01	
28	4	6	Wojciech Wojdak	Poland	15:13.18	
29	2	3	Brandonn Almeida	Brazil	15:14.73	
30	4	5	Pál Joensen	Denmark	15:18.49	
31	2	1	Miguel Valente	Brazil	15:22.57	
32	6	8	Florian Wellbrock	Germany	15:23.88	
33	3	6	Mateusz Sawrymowicz	Poland	15:26.33	
34	4	8	Richárd Nagy	Slovakia	15:26.48	
35	2	5	Kristóf Rasovszky	Hungary	15:29.36	
36	2	8	Martin Bau	Slovenia	15:29.95	
37	1	5	Mihajlo Čeprkalo	Bosnia and Herzegovina	15:31.62	
38	1	3	Matthew Hutchins	New Zealand	15:32.60	
39	1	6	Welson Sim	Malaysia	15:32.63	
40	3	4	Nicolas D'Oriano	France	15:33.62	
41	3	1	Matthew Meyer	South Africa	15:36.22	
42	4	2	Felix Auböck	Austria	15:36.24	
43	2	7	Martín Naidich	Argentina	15:39.93	
44	1	2	Wesley Roberts	Cook Islands	15:44.32	
45	1	7	Felipe Tapia	Chile	16:02.44	
	3	8	Park Tae-hwan	South Korea	DNS	

=== Final ===
Rank	Lane	Name	Nationality	Time	Notes
1st place, gold medalist(s)	4	Gregorio Paltrinieri	Italy	14:34.57	
2nd place, silver medalist(s)	5	Connor Jaeger	United States	14:39.48	AM
3rd place, bronze medalist(s)	2	Gabriele Detti	Italy	14:40.86	
4	3	Jordan Wilimovsky	United States	14:45.03	
5	6	Mack Horton	Australia	14:49.54	
6	1	Ryan Cochrane	Canada	14:49.61	
7	7	Damien Joly	France	14:52.73	
8	8	Henrik Christiansen	Norway	15:02.66	
