= 2012 FINA World Swimming Championships (25 m) – Men's 400 metre freestyle =

Men's 400m Freestyle at the 2012 Short Course Worlds
- Dates: 14 December (heats and final)
- Winning time: 3:39.15

Medalists
gold medal	Paul Biedermann	Germany
silver medal	Hao Yun	China
bronze medal	Matthew Stanley	New Zealand

The men's 400 metre freestyle event at the 11th FINA World Swimming Championships (25m) took place 14 December 2012 at the Sinan Erdem Dome.

In June 2013, Danish swimmer Mads Glæsner was stripped of the bronze medal after testing positive for levomethamphetamine.

== Records ==
Prior to this competition, the existing world and championship records were as follows.

	Name	Nation	Time	Location	Date
World record	Yannick Agnel	France	3:32.25	Angers	15 November 2012
Championship record	Grant Hackett	Australia	3:35.01	Hong Kong	1 April 1999

No new records were set during this competition.

== Results ==
=== Heats ===
Rank	Heat	Lane	Name	Time	Notes
1	6	4	Michael Klueh (USA)	3:41.07	Q
2	6	2	Ahmed Mathlouthi (TUN)	3:41.34	Q
3	5	5	Paul Biedermann (GER)	3:41.40	Q
4	6	3	Matthew Stanley (NZL)	3:41.59	Q
5	7	8	Anders Lie (DEN)	3:41.80	Q
6	1	7	Hao Yun (CHN)	3:42.13	Q
7	5	4	Pál Joensen (FRO)	3:42.43	Q
8	5	3	Andrea Mitchell D'Arrigo (ITA)	3:42.49	
9	7	0	Devon Myles Brown (RSA)	3:42.76	
10	6	5	Gabriele Detti (ITA)	3:42.97	
11	7	3	Mikhail Polischuk (RUS)	3:43.05	
12	6	6	Serhiy Frolov (UKR)	3:43.29	
13	7	6	Alexander Selin (RUS)	3:43.52	
14	5	7	Ieuan Lloyd (GBR)	3:43.70	
15	5	2	Jordan Harrison (AUS)	3:43.88	
16	7	5	Dominik Meichtry (SUI)	3:44.09	
17	6	9	Ryan Feeley (USA)	3:44.22	
18	7	7	Jarrod Killey (AUS)	3:44.46	
19	7	2	Fumiya Hidaka (JPN)	3:44.56	
20	5	0	Yohei Takiguchi (JPN)	3:45.77	
21	5	6	Ewan Jackson (NZL)	3:46.00	
22	6	1	Gergely Gyurta (HUN)	3:47.19	
23	6	8	Patrik Rakos (HUN)	3:47.56	
24	4	2	Anton Sveinn McKee (ISL)	3:47.83	NR
25	7	9	Juan Pereyra (ARG)	3:48.29	
26	4	4	Nezir Karap (TUR)	3:48.56	NR
27	4	5	Anton Goncharov (UKR)	3:48.62	
28	6	7	Anthony Pannier (FRA)	3:48.70	
29	5	1	Robert Renwick (GBR)	3:49.17	
30	6	0	Richárd Nagy (SVK)	3:49.38	
31	4	7	Ediz Yıldırımer (TUR)	3:49.45	
32	1	4	Uladzimir Zhyharau (BLR)	3:49.63	
33	1	1	Pu Wenjie (CHN)	3:49.86	
34	4	3	Arturo Pérez Vertti (MEX)	3:51.30	
35	1	2	Ensar Hajder (BIH)	3:51.69	NR
36	4	9	Irakli Revishvili (GEO)	3:54.56	
37	5	9	Martin Naidich (ARG)	3:54.76	
38	3	3	Marko Blaževski (MKD)	3:56.32	NR
39	4	6	Matthew Abeysinghe (SRI)	3:56.79	
40	4	0	Yeziel Morales (PUR)	3:57.85	NR
41	4	8	Aleksander Slepchenko (KGZ)	3:59.58	
42	3	0	Marcelo Alberto Acosta Jimenez (ESA)	4:00.22	
43	3	2	Welliam Maksi (SYR)	4:00.62	
44	4	1	Sobitjon Amilov (UZB)	4:01.31	
45	3	6	Iacovos Hadjiconstantinou (CYP)	4:01.37	
46	3	4	Khurshidjon Tursunov (UZB)	4:02.62	
47	3	5	Jesus Monge (PER)	4:02.94	
48	3	8	Edward Caruana Dingli (MLT)	4:06.30	
49	2	6	Khader Baqleh (JOR)	4:10.77	
50	3	7	Christian Selby (BAR)	4:11.79	
51	2	4	Paul Elaisa (FIJ)	4:12.16	
52	3	1	Quinton Delie (NAM)	4:12.61	NR
53	2	5	Adam Viktora (SEY)	4:15.31	
54	3	9	Fernando Medrano Medina (NCA)	4:17.66	
55	2	3	Bakr Salam Ali (IRQ)	4:18.40	
56	2	2	Anderson Lim (BRU)	4:23.37	
57	2	1	Israr Hussain (PAK)	4:26.14	
58	2	7	Franc Aleksi (ALB)	4:31.26	
59	2	9	Sirish Gurung (NEP)	4:37.41	
60	2	0	Noah Al-Khulaifi (QAT)	4:37.59	
61	2	8	Farhan Farhan (BHR)	4:46.60	
—	1	3	Nikolas Sylvester (VIN)	DNF	
—	1	5	Storm Halbich (VIN)	DNF	
—	1	6	Alejandro Gómez (VEN)	DNS	
—	5	8	Mateusz Sawrymowicz (POL)	DNS	
—	7	1	Filip Zaborowski (POL)	DNS	
—	7	4	Mads Glæsner (DEN)	~~3:40.89~~	DQ

=== Final ===
The final was held at 19:55.

Rank	Lane	Name	Nationality	Time	Notes
1st place, gold medalist(s)	6	Paul Biedermann	Germany	3:39.15	
2nd place, silver medalist(s)	1	Hao Yun	China	3:39.48	
3rd place, bronze medalist(s)	2	Matthew Stanley	New Zealand	3:41.01	
4	5	Michael Klueh	United States	3:41.29	
5	8	Pál Joensen	Faroe Islands	3:42.23	
6	3	Ahmed Mathlouthi	Tunisia	3:42.48	
7	7	Anders Lie	Denmark	3:42.80	
—	4	Mads Glæsner	Denmark	~~3:40.09~~	DQ
