= Swimming at the 2012 Summer Olympics – Men's 400 metre freestyle =

Men's 400 metre freestyle at the Games of the XXX Olympiad
- Venue: London Aquatics Centre
- Date: July 28, 2012 (heats & final)
- Competitors: 28 from 23 nations
- Winning time: 3:40.14 OR

Medalists
1st place, gold medalist(s)		Sun Yang	China
2nd place, silver medalist(s)		Park Tae-hwan	South Korea
3rd place, bronze medalist(s)		Peter Vanderkaay	United States

The men's 400 metre freestyle event at the 2012 Summer Olympics took place on 28 July at the London Aquatics Centre in London, United Kingdom.

Sun Yang made a historic milestone to become China's first ever male gold medalist in swimming, as he continued to build another Asian supremacy for the event, together with an Olympic record. He held off South Korea's defending champion Park Tae-hwan on the final stretch to effortlessly secure the gold medal in a sterling time of 3:40.14, cutting off Ian Thorpe's 2000 Olympic record by nearly half a second.

Meanwhile, Park ended a dramatic day with a silver medal in his pocket at 3:42.06. Earlier in the prelims, he was disqualified for an immediate false start from heat three, but reinstated in the final after the Korean Swimming Federation filed an appeal. U.S. swimmer Peter Vanderkaay added a second individual bronze and fourth career medal to his Olympic hardware in 3:44.69.

China's Hao Yun (3:46.02), Vanderkaay's teammate Conor Dwyer (3:46.39), Hungary's Gergő Kis (3:47.03), Great Britain's David Carry (3:48.62), and Australia's Ryan Napoleon (3:49.25) also vied for an Olympic medal to round out the championship field.

Notable swimmers missed the final roster including Canada's Ryan Cochrane, who was bumped out of the lineup to ninth (3:47.26) after Park's disqualification had been overturned; and Biedermann, who struggled to keep his form with a thirteenth-place effort in the prelims (3:48.50).

== Records ==
Prior to this competition, the existing world and Olympic records were as follows.

World record	Paul Biedermann (GER)	3:40.07	Rome, Italy	26 July 2009
Olympic record	Ian Thorpe (AUS)	3:40.59	Sydney, Australia	16 September 2000

The following records were established during the competition:

Date	Event	Name	Nationality	Time	Record
July 28	Final	Sun Yang	China	3:40.14	OR

== Results ==
=== Heats ===
Rank	Heat	Lane	Name	Nationality	Time	Notes
1	4	4	Sun Yang	China	3:45.07	Q
2	4	5	Peter Vanderkaay	United States	3:45.80	Q
3	4	7	Conor Dwyer	United States	3:46.24	Q
4	3	4	Park Tae-hwan	South Korea	3:46.68	Q
5	3	2	Gergő Kis	Hungary	3:46.77	Q
6	4	3	Hao Yun	China	3:46.88	Q
7	3	5	Ryan Napoleon	Australia	3:47.01	Q
8	3	6	David Carry	Great Britain	3:47.25	Q
9	2	5	Ryan Cochrane	Canada	3:47.26	
10	4	6	Pál Joensen	Denmark	3:47.36	
11	2	3	Robert Renwick	Great Britain	3:47.44	
12	2	6	Mads Glæsner	Denmark	3:48.27	
13	2	4	Paul Biedermann	Germany	3:48.50	
14	3	3	David McKeon	Australia	3:48.57	
15	2	2	Matthew Stanley	New Zealand	3:49.44	
16	4	8	Cristian Quintero Valero	Venezuela	3:50.44	
17	3	1	Sergiy Frolov	Ukraine	3:50.63	
18	4	2	Samuel Pizzetti	Italy	3:50.93	
19	4	1	Dominik Meichtry	Switzerland	3:51.34	
20	2	7	Egor Degtyarev	Russia	3:52.33	
21	1	4	Mateusz Sawrymowicz	Poland	3:53.33	
22	3	8	Matias Koski	Finland	3:54.96	
23	2	8	Đorđe Marković	Serbia	3:55.35	
24	2	1	Juan Martin Pereyra	Argentina	3:56.76	
25	3	7	Heerden Herman	South Africa	3:57.28	
26	1	5	Mateo de Angulo	Colombia	3:57.76	
27	1	6	Ahmed Gebrel	Palestine	4:08.51	
28	1	3	Allan Gutierrez Castro	Honduras	4:09.10	

=== Final ===
Rank	Lane	Name	Nationality	Time	Notes
1st place, gold medalist(s)	4	Sun Yang	China	3:40.14	OR, AS
2nd place, silver medalist(s)	6	Park Tae-hwan	South Korea	3:42.06	
3rd place, bronze medalist(s)	5	Peter Vanderkaay	United States	3:44.69	
4	7	Hao Yun	China	3:46.02	
5	3	Conor Dwyer	United States	3:46.39	
6	2	Gergő Kis	Hungary	3:47.03	
7	8	David Carry	Great Britain	3:48.62	
8	1	Ryan Napoleon	Australia	3:49.25	
