= Swimming at the 2016 Summer Olympics – Men's 400 metre freestyle =

Men's 400 metre freestyle at the Games of the XXXI Olympiad
- Venue: Olympic Aquatics Stadium
- Dates: 6 August 2016 (heats & final)
- Competitors: 50 from 39 nations
- Winning time: 3:41.55

Medalists
1st place, gold medalist(s)		Mack Horton	Australia
2nd place, silver medalist(s)		Sun Yang	China
3rd place, bronze medalist(s)		Gabriele Detti	Italy

The men's 400 metre freestyle event at the 2016 Summer Olympics took place on 6 August at the Olympic Aquatics Stadium. The winning margin was 0.13 seconds.

== Summary ==
China's Sun Yang fell short of his attempt to a back-to-back gold in one of the program's long-distance freestyle races due to a strong performance from Australia's Mack Horton. Heading into the final lap with a narrow 0.14-second lead, Horton managed to hold off the fast-charging Sun towards the finish for his first individual gold medal in 3:41.55. Unable to catch his Aussie rival near the wall by 13-hundredths of a second, Sun settled for the silver in 3:41.68. Meanwhile, Gabriele Detti picked up the bronze with a time of 3:43.49 to become Italy's first male Olympic medalist in swimming since 2000.

Conor Dwyer (3:44.01), the fastest swimmer headed into the final, and fellow American Connor Jaeger (3:44.16) finished off the podium in fourth and fifth respectively, separated by a 0.15-second margin. Great Britain's James Guy led the pack towards the halfway mark under a world record pace, but faded to sixth in 3:44.68. Horton's teammate David McKeon (3:45.28) and France's Jordan Pothain (3:49.07) rounded out the field.

South Korean swimmer and Beijing 2008 champion Park Tae-hwan, as well as Canada's long distance ace Ryan Cochrane, did not advance to the final, finishing tenth and eleventh in the prelims.

== Records ==
Prior to this competition, the existing world and Olympic records were as follows.

World record	Paul Biedermann (GER)	3:40.07	Rome, Italy	26 July 2009
Olympic record	Sun Yang (CHN)	3:40.14	London, Great Britain	28 July 2012

== Competition format ==
The competition consisted of two rounds: heats and a final. The swimmers with the best 8 times in the heats advanced to the final. Swim-offs were used as necessary to break ties for advancement to the next round.

== Results ==
=== Heats ===
The heats began at 1:48 pm.

Rank	Heat	Lane	Name	Nationality	Time	Notes
1	7	2	Conor Dwyer	United States	3:43.42	Q
2	7	4	Mack Horton	Australia	3:43.84	Q
3	7	3	Gabriele Detti	Italy	3:43.95	Q
4	6	4	Sun Yang	China	3:44.23	Q
5	7	6	David McKeon	Australia	3:44.68	Q
6	7	5	James Guy	Great Britain	3:45.31	Q
7	6	5	Connor Jaeger	United States	3:45.37	Q
8	5	7	Jordan Pothain	France	3:45.43	Q
9	6	2	Florian Vogel	Germany	3:45.49	
10	6	3	Park Tae-hwan	South Korea	3:45.63	
11	6	6	Ryan Cochrane	Canada	3:45.83	
12	5	1	Myles Brown	South Africa	3:45.92	
13	7	1	Stephen Milne	Great Britain	3:46.00	
14	7	8	Velimir Stjepanović	Serbia	3:46.78	
15	5	4	Aleksandr Krasnykh	Russia	3:47.39	
16	4	5	Marwan El-Kamash	Egypt	3:47.43	
17	6	7	Henrik Christiansen	Norway	3:47.90	
18	5	5	Maarten Brzoskowski	Netherlands	3:48.00	
19	4	2	Matthew Hutchins	New Zealand	3:48.25	
20	4	3	Anton Ipsen	Denmark	3:48.31	
21	7	7	Péter Bernek	Hungary	3:48.58	
22	3	8	Marcelo Acosta	El Salvador	3:48.82	
23	6	1	Wojciech Wojdak	Poland	3:48.87	
24	5	3	Clemens Rapp	Germany	3:49.10	
25	6	8	Felix Auböck	Austria	3:49.35	
26	5	8	Qiu Ziao	China	3:49.45	
27	4	4	Ahmed Akram	Egypt	3:49.46	
28	5	2	Filip Zaborowski	Poland	3:49.84	
29	4	1	Jan Micka	Czech Republic	3:49.97	
30	4	8	Vyacheslav Andrusenko	Russia	3:50.23	
31	5	6	Naito Ehara	Japan	3:50.61	
32	3	2	Luiz Altamir Melo	Brazil	3:50.82	
33	2	3	Cristian Quintero	Venezuela	3:50.84	
34	3	7	Welson Sim	Malaysia	3:51.57	
35	2	4	Ahmed Mathlouthi	Tunisia	3:52.00	
36	4	6	Mads Glæsner	Denmark	3:52.59	
37	4	7	Miguel Durán	Spain	3:53.40	ƒ
38	3	5	Gergő Kis	Hungary	3:54.15	
39	2	5	Martín Naidich	Argentina	3:54.58	
40	3	6	David Brandl	Austria	3:54.59	
41	3	1	Dimitrios Dimitriou	Greece	3:54.98	
42	3	4	Matias Koski	Finland	3:55.57	
43	3	3	Nezir Karap	Turkey	3:58.37	
44	2	7	Alex Sobers	Barbados	3:59.97	
45	2	2	Irakli Revishvili	Georgia	4:00.56	
46	2	6	Jessie Lacuna	Philippines	4:01.70	
47	2	1	Iacovos Hadjiconstantinou	Cyprus	4:03.53	
48	1	4	Geoffrey Butler	Cayman Islands	4:07.87	
49	1	5	Pol Arias	Andorra	4:21.16	
50	1	3	Haris Bandey	Pakistan	4:33.13	

ƒ False start, but allowed to continue at referee's discretion.

=== Final ===
The final began at 10:30 pm.

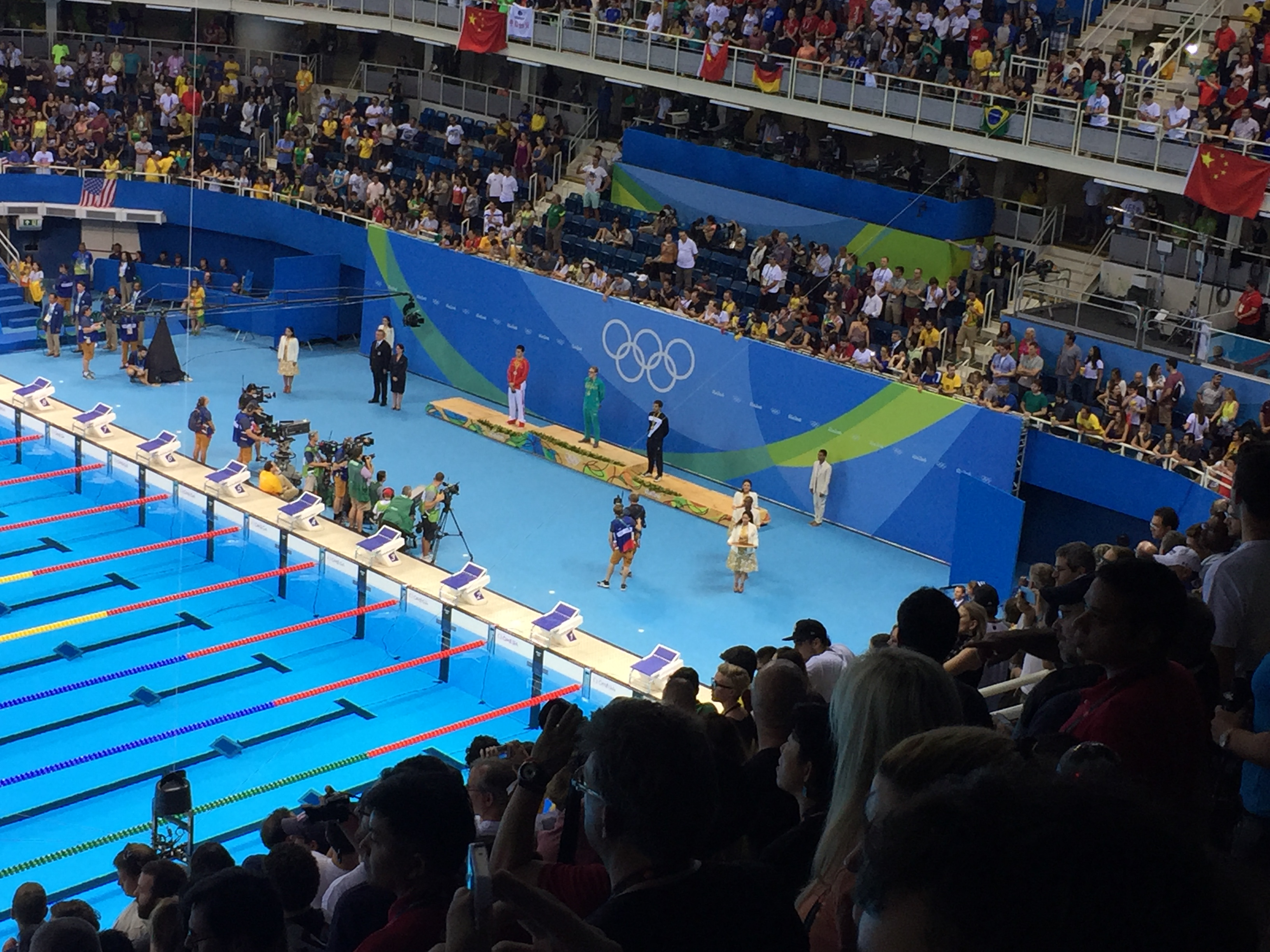
Medal ceremony for the 400 m freestyle.

Rank	Lane	Name	Nationality	Time	Notes
1st place, gold medalist(s)	5	Mack Horton	Australia	3:41.55	
2nd place, silver medalist(s)	6	Sun Yang	China	3:41.68	
3rd place, bronze medalist(s)	3	Gabriele Detti	Italy	3:43.49	
4	4	Conor Dwyer	United States	3:44.01	
5	1	Connor Jaeger	United States	3:44.16	
6	7	James Guy	Great Britain	3:44.68	
7	2	David McKeon	Australia	3:45.28	
8	8	Jordan Pothain	France	3:49.07	
