= Swimming at the 2012 European Aquatics Championships – Men's 400 metre freestyle =

Men's 400 metre freestyle at the 2012 European Aquatics Championships
- Dates: May 21, 2012 (heats and final)
- Competitors: 33 from 18 nations
- Winning time: 3:47.84

Medalists
gold medal	Paul Biedermann	Germany
silver medal	Gergő Kis	Hungary
bronze medal	Samuel Pizzetti	Italy

The men's 400 metre freestyle competition of the swimming events at the 2012 European Aquatics Championships took place May 21. The heats and final took place on May 21.

== Records ==
Prior to the competition, the existing world, European and championship records were as follows.

	Name	Nation	Time	Location	Date
World record European record	Paul Biedermann	Germany	3:40.07	Rome	July 26, 2009
Championship record	Yury Prilukov	Russia	3:45.10	Eindhoven	March 18, 2008

== Results ==
=== Heats ===
33 swimmers participated in 5 heats.

Rank	Heat	Lane	Name	Nationality	Time	Notes
1	5	5	Samuel Pizzetti	Italy	3:49.65	Q
2	5	4	Paul Biedermann	Germany	3:50.43	Q
3	4	5	Gergő Kis	Hungary	3:52.57	Q
4	5	1	Patrik Rakos	Hungary	3:52.58	Q
5	3	3	Gabriele Detti	Italy	3:52.74	Q
6	4	4	Sébastien Rouault	France	3:53.06	Q
7	3	6	Alex di Giorgio	Italy	3:53.25	
8	4	6	Evgeny Kulikov	Russia	3:53.35	Q
9	3	4	Robert Renwick	Great Britain	3:53.49	Q
10	5	3	Dominik Meichtry	Switzerland	3:53.93	
11	4	8	Stefan Šorak	Serbia	3:53.97	
12	5	2	Christian Scherübl	Austria	3:54.04	
13	3	2	Dorde Marković	Serbia	3:54.17	
14	4	3	Alexander Selin	Russia	3:54.48	
15	4	2	David Brandl	Austria	3:55.14	
16	3	1	Richárd Nagy	Slovakia	3:55.63	
17	3	5	Clemens Rapp	Germany	3:56.02	
18	3	8	Jovan Mitrovic	Switzerland	3:56.39	
19	2	4	Filip Bujoczek	Poland	3:56.62	
20	3	7	Pavel Medvedtsky	Russia	3:56.86	
21	1	4	Jean-Baptiste Febo	Switzerland	3:56.96	
22	2	6	Ediz Yildirimer	Turkey	3:57.02	
23	4	1	David Karasek	Switzerland	3:57.47	
24	2	5	Gard Kvale	Norway	3:57.89	
24	5	8	Uladzimir Zhyharau	Belarus	3:57.89	
26	4	7	Velimir Stjepanović	Serbia	3:58.10	
27	5	6	Damien Joly	France	3:58.56	
28	2	7	Jan Karel Petric	Slovenia	4:00.86	
29	2	3	Antonio Arroyo Pérez	Spain	4:01.50	
30	5	7	Michal Szuba	Poland	4:03.06	
31	2	2	Irakli Revishvili	Georgia	4:03.79	
32	1	5	Aleksandar Nikolov	Bulgaria	4:09.99	
33	1	3	Peter Gutyan	Slovakia	4:10.27	

=== Final ===
The final was held at 17:02.

Rank	Lane	Name	Nationality	Time	Notes
1st place, gold medalist(s)	5	Paul Biedermann	Germany	3:47.84	
2nd place, silver medalist(s)	3	Gergő Kis	Hungary	3:48.09	
3rd place, bronze medalist(s)	4	Samuel Pizzetti	Italy	3:48.66	
4	8	Robert Renwick	Great Britain	3:50.46	
5	7	Sébastien Rouault	France	3:50.62	
6	2	Gabriele Detti	Italy	3:51.92	
7	1	Evgeny Kulikov	Russia	3:52.57	
8	6	Patrik Rakos	Hungary	3:52.80	
