= 2010 FINA Swimming World Cup =

International swimming competition

The 2010 FINA Swimming World Cup was a series of seven short-course meters (25m) meets, held from September-early November 2010. The 2010 series was again titled sponsored by Arena.

== Meets ==
The 2010 World Cup featured 7 meets (one more than 2009), which were divided into 3 segments: the first meet (Brazil, in September), an Asian leg (October), and a European leg (late October–November). Meet dates and locations are:

Meet	Dates	Location	Results
1	10–12 September	Rio de Janeiro, Brazil	Results
2	12–13 October	Beijing, China	Results
3	16–17 October	Singapore	Results
4	20–21 October	Tokyo, Japan	Results Book
5	30–31 October	Berlin, Germany	Results
6	2–3 November	Moscow, Russia	Results
7	6–7 November	Stockholm, Sweden	Results

== Results ==
=== Overall World Cup ===
At each meet of the World Cup circuit in 2010, the FINA Points Table was used to rank all swim performances at the meet. The top 10 men and top 10 women were then awarded World Cup points. Bonus points were awarded for a world record broken (20 points) or equalled (10 points). The number of World Cup points awarded was doubled for the final meet of the World Cup in Stockholm.

Rank on FINA Points	World Cup points awarded
1	25
2	20
3	16
4	13
5	10
6	7
7	5
8	3
9	2
10	1

==== Men ====
Official Overall Scoring:

Rank	Name	Nationality	Points awarded (Bonus)							Total
Rank	Name	Nationality	BRA	CHN	SIN	JPN	GER	RUS	SWE	Total
1	Thiago Pereira	Brazil	25	25	25	13	25	25	40	178
2	Darian Townsend	South Africa		20	16	7	13	20	50	126
3	Roland Schoeman	South Africa		5	10	5	20	2	32	74
4	Peter Marshall	United States		16	3		2		26	47
5	Naoya Tomita	Japan		13	7	16				36
6	Henrique Rodrigues	Brazil	20						6	26
7	Takeshi Matsuda	Japan				25				25
8	Cameron van der Burgh	South Africa		10	13					23
9	Markus Rogan	Austria				20				20
10	Brian Johns	Canada			20					20
11	Sébastien Rouault	France							20	20
12	Steffen Deibler	Germany	16			2	1			19
13	Markus Deibler	Germany					16			16
14	Danila Izotov	Russia						16		16
15	Arkady Vyatchanin	Russia					5	10		15
16	Paul Biedermann	Germany							14	14
17	Felipe Silva	Brazil	13							13
18	Stanislav Donets	Russia						13		13
19	Dávid Verrasztó	Hungary					10			10
20	Daiya Seto	Japan				3	7			10
21	Ryo Tateishi	Japan				10				10
22	Randall Bal	United States	10							10
23	Yanick Angel	France							10	10
24	Kazuki Otsuka	Japan	3	3	2					8
25	Guilherme Guido	Brazil		7	1					8
26	César Cielo	Brazil	7							7
27	Paweł Korzeniowski	Poland						7		7
28	Lucas Kanieski	Brazil			5					5
29	Evgeny Lagunov	Russia						5		5
30	Sergey Fesikov	Russia							4	4
31	Job Kienhuis	Netherlands					3			3
32	Tales Cerdeira	Brazil	3							3
33	Pál Joensen	Faroe Islands						3		3
34	Simon Sjödin	Sweden							2	2
35	Leonardo de Deus	Brazil	2							2
36	Henrique Barbosa	Brazil		2						2
37	Hidemasa Sano	Japan				1				1
38	Nikolay Skvortsov	Russia	1							1
39	Kohei Kawamoto	Japan		1						1
40	Nikita Konovalov	Russia						1		1

==== Women ====
Official Overall Scoring:

Rank	Name	Nationality	Points awarded (Bonus)							Total
Rank	Name	Nationality	BRA	CHN	SIN	JPN	GER	RUS	SWE	Total
1	Therese Alshammar	Sweden	25	5	25	25	16	16	50	162
2	Julia Smit	United States		10	20	20	13	25	40	128
3	Hinkelien Schreuder	Netherlands	10	3	13	1	10	13	10	60
4	Dana Vollmer	United States					25		20	45
5	Angie Bainbridge	Australia					7	26		33
6	Camille Muffat	France							32	32
7	Elaine Breeden	United States		2	3	10		7	6	28
8	Gao Chang	China		25						25
9	Femke Heemskerk	Netherlands					20			20
10	Jing Liu	China		20						20
11	Veronika Popova	Russia						20		20
12	Gabriella Silva	Brazil	20							20
13	Belinda Hocking	Australia					5		14	19
14	Qianwei Zhu	China		16						16
15	Aya Terakawa	Japan				16				16
16	Tao Li	Singapore			16					16
17	Sakiko Nakamura	Japan	16							16
18	Shiwen Ye	China		13						13
19	Haruka Ueda	Japan				13				13
20	Miyuki Takemura	Japan	13							13
21	Melissa Ingram	New Zealand			10					10
22	Daryna Zevina	Russia						10		10
23	Rongrong Zheng	China		7						7
24	Yuka Kato	Japan				7				7
25	Rachel Goh	Australia			7					7
26	Cecilia Biagioli	Argentina	7							7
27	Jeanette Ottesen	Denmark						3	2	5
28	Natalie Coughlin	United States				5				5
29	Kotuku Ngawati	Australia			5					5
30	Daria Belyakina	Russia						5		5
31	Poliana Okimoto	Brazil	5							5
32	Lotte Friis	Denmark							4	4
33	Sarah Sjöström	Sweden					3			3
34	Sayaka Akase	Japan				3				3
35	Flávia Delaroli	Brazil	3							3
36	Evelyn Verrasztó	Hungary					2			2
37	Hanae Ito	Japan				2				2
38	Marieke Guehrer	Australia			2					2
39	Kirsty Coventry	Zimbabwe						2		2
40	Tatiana Barbosa	Brazil	2							2
41	Kristel Kobrich	Chile					1			1
42	Xinyu Wang	China		1						1
43	Jie Gong	China			1					1
44	Yuliya Yefimova	Russia						1		1
45	Fabíola Molina	Brazil	1							1

=== Event winners ===
==== 50 m freestyle ====
Meet	Men			Women		
Meet	Winner	Nationality	Time	Winner	Nationality	Time
Rio de Janeiro	César Cielo	Brazil	21.16	Therese Alshammar	Sweden	24.46
Beijing	Roland Schoeman	South Africa	21.47	Therese Alshammar	Sweden	24.04
Singapore	Steffen Deibler	Germany	21.41	Hinkelien Schreuder	Netherlands	23.98
Tokyo	Kyle Richardson	Australia	21.42	Hinkelien Schreuder	Netherlands	24.09
Berlin	Roland Schoeman	South Africa	21.01	Hinkelien Schreuder	Netherlands	24.06
Moscow	Roland Schoeman	South Africa	21.50	Hinkelien Schreuder	Netherlands	24.39
Stockholm	Roland Schoeman	South Africa	21.30	Hinkelien Schreuder	Netherlands	23.91

==== 100 m freestyle ====
Meet	Men			Women		
Meet	Winner	Nationality	Time	Winner	Nationality	Time
Rio de Janeiro	César Cielo	Brazil	47.16	Tatiana Lemos	Brazil	54.20
Beijing	Lyndon Ferns	South Africa	47.70	Shiwen Ye	China	53.66
Singapore	Kyle Richardson	Australia	47.40	Kotuku Ngawati	Australia	53.55
Tokyo	Kyle Richardson	Australia	47.26	Marieke Guehrer	Australia	53.17
Berlin	Steffen Deibler	Germany	46.69	Femke Heemskerk	Netherlands	51.96
Moscow	Lyndon Ferns	South Africa	47.46	Jeanette Ottesen	Denmark	53.63
Stockholm	Stefan Nystrand	Sweden	47.07	Sarah Sjöström	Sweden	53.13

==== 200 m freestyle ====
Meet	Men			Women		
Meet	Winner	Nationality	Time	Winner	Nationality	Time
Rio de Janeiro	Thiago Pereira	Brazil	1:45.28	Tatiana Lemos	Brazil	1:58.08
Beijing	Darian Townsend	South Africa	1:44.27	Qianwei Zhu	China	1:54.32
Singapore	Darian Townsend	South Africa	1:44.30	Jiaqi Zhang	China	1:56.95
Tokyo	Takeshi Matsuda	Japan	1:43.93	Haruka Ueda	Japan	1:54.43
Berlin	Paul Biedermann	Germany	1:44.36	Femke Heemskerk	Netherlands	1:52.42 WC
Moscow	Danila Izotov	Russia	1:42.77	Veronika Popova	Russia	1:55.25
Stockholm	Paul Biedermann	Germany	1:43.03	Camille Muffat	France	1:53.74

==== 400 m freestyle ====
Meet	Men			Women		
Meet	Winner	Nationality	Time	Winner	Nationality	Time
Rio de Janeiro	Kenichi Doki	Japan	3:47.20	Sakiko Nakamura	Japan	4:06.73
Beijing	Zhongchao Zhang	China	3:46.00	Liu Jing	China	4:00.55
Singapore	Dominik Meichtry	Switzerland	3:44.32	Melissa Ingram	New Zealand	4:05.91
Tokyo	Sho Uchida	Japan	3:43.38	Haruka Ueda	Japan	4:06.57
Berlin	Paul Biedermann	Germany	3:42.31	Angie Bainbridge	Australia	4:02.82
Moscow	Pál Joensen	Faroe Islands	3:45.56	Elena Sokolova	Russia	4:07.44
Stockholm	Paul Biedermann	Germany	3:41.27	Camille Muffat	France	4:01.18

==== 1500 m (men) / 800 m (women) freestyle ====
Meet	Men			Women		
Meet	Winner	Nationality	Time	Winner	Nationality	Time
Rio de Janeiro	Lucas Kanieski	Brazil	14:53.19	Sakiko Nakamura	Japan	8:27.53
Beijing	Zibin Zhang	China	15:05.59	Luomeng Ren	China	8:28.41
Singapore	Lucas Kanieski	Brazil	14:45.65	Jessica Pengelly	South Africa	8:30.22
Tokyo	Sho Uchida	Japan	14:54.38	Maiko Fujino	Japan	8:26.24
Berlin	Job Kienhuis	Netherlands	14:40.11	Kristel Köbrich	Chile	8:21.66
Moscow	Pál Joensen	Faroe Islands	14:50.66	Elizaveta Gorshkova	Russia	8:29.42
Stockholm	Sébastien Rouault	France	14:37.94	Lotte Friis	Denmark	8:20.66

==== 50 m backstroke ====
Meet	Men			Women		
Meet	Winner	Nationality	Time	Winner	Nationality	Time
Rio de Janeiro	Randall Bal	United States	23.46	Miyuki Takemura	Japan	27.12
Beijing	Peter Marshall	United States	23.38	Gao Chang	China	26.00
Singapore	Peter Marshall	United States	23.57	Rachel Goh	Australia	26.64
Tokyo	Junya Koga	Japan	23.58	Aya Terakawa	Japan	26.66
Berlin	Peter Marshall	United States	23.44	Belinda Hocking	Australia	26.99
Moscow	Stanislav Donets	Russia	23.75	Anastasia Zuyeva	Russia	27.20
Stockholm	Peter Marshall	United States	23.35	Belinda Hocking	Australia	27.42

==== 100 m backstroke ====
Meet	Men			Women		
Meet	Winner	Nationality	Time	Winner	Nationality	Time
Rio de Janeiro	Guilherme Guido	Brazil	51.44	Miyuki Takemura	Japan	58.01
Beijing	Guilherme Guido	Brazil	50.90	Gao Chang	China	57.45
Singapore	Guilherme Guido	Brazil	51.16	Natalie Coughlin	United States	57.78
Tokyo	Peter Marshall	United States	50.94	Aya Terakawa	Japan	56.90
Berlin	Randall Bal	United States	51.34	Femke Heemskerk	Netherlands	57.72
Moscow	Stanislav Donets	Russia	50.87	Daryna Zevina	Ukraine	58.92
Stockholm	Peter Marshall	United States	50.79	Belinda Hocking	Australia	58.13

==== 200 m backstroke ====
Meet	Men			Women		
Meet	Winner	Nationality	Time	Winner	Nationality	Time
Rio de Janeiro	Arkady Vyatchanin	Russia	1:51.92	Miyuki Takemura	Japan	2:06.24
Beijing	Arkady Vyatchanin	Russia	1:52.42	Julia Smit	United States	2:06.29
Singapore	Arkady Vyatchanin	Russia	1:52.99	Melissa Ingram	New Zealand	2:03.99
Tokyo	Ryosuke Irie	Japan	1:50.58	Aya Terakawa	Japan	2:03.62
Berlin	Arkady Vyatchanin	Russia	1:49.48	Belinda Hocking	Australia	2:03.99
Moscow	Arkady Vyatchanin	Russia	1:51.44	Daryna Zevina	Ukraine	2:05.50
Stockholm	Arkady Vyatchanin	Russia	1:51.78	Belinda Hocking	Australia	2:03.43

==== 50 m breaststroke ====
Meet	Men			Women		
Meet	Winner	Nationality	Time	Winner	Nationality	Time
Rio de Janeiro	Felipe Silva	Brazil	26.56	Joline Hoestman	Sweden	31.38
Beijing	Cameron van der Burgh	South Africa	26.36	Jennie Johansson	Sweden	30.68
Singapore	Cameron van der Burgh	South Africa	26.21	Jessica Hardy	United States	30.35
Tokyo	Roland Schoeman	South Africa	26.42	Jennie Johansson	Sweden	30.47
Berlin	Roland Schoeman	South Africa	26.09	Yuliya Yefimova	Russia	30.16
Moscow	Roland Schoeman	South Africa	26.48	Yuliya Yefimova	Russia	30.28
Stockholm	Roland Schoeman	South Africa	26.34	Jennie Johansson	Sweden	30.10

==== 100 m breaststroke ====
Meet	Men			Women		
Meet	Winner	Nationality	Time	Winner	Nationality	Time
Rio de Janeiro	Felipe Silva	Brazil	57.64	Joline Hoestman	Sweden	1:07.44
Beijing	Cameron van der Burgh	South Africa	57.75	Ye Sun	China	1:06.18
Singapore	Cameron van der Burgh	South Africa	57.82	Jessica Hardy	United States	1:06.49
Tokyo	Ryo Tateishi	Japan	57.43	Jessica Hardy	United States	1:05.85
Berlin	Stanislav Lakhtyukhov	Russia	58.47	Yuliya Yefimova	Russia	1:05.54
Moscow	Stanislav Lakhtyukhov	Russia	58.92	Yuliya Yefimova	Russia	1:06.50
Stockholm	Stanislav Lakhtyukhov	Russia	58.79	Jennie Johansson	Sweden	1:05.64

==== 200 m breaststroke ====
Meet	Men			Women		
Meet	Winner	Nationality	Time	Winner	Nationality	Time
Rio de Janeiro	Kazuki Otsuka	Japan	2:05.60	Joline Hoestman	Sweden	2:26.51
Beijing	Naoya Tomita	Japan	2:05.30	Ye Sun	China	2:21.80
Singapore	Naoya Tomita	Japan	2:05.43	Nanaka Tamura	Japan	2:22.74
Tokyo	Naoya Tomita	Japan	2:03.18	Rie Kaneto	Japan	2:20.83
Berlin	Grigory Falko	Russia	2:06.73	Sally Foster	Australia	2:20.82
Moscow	Maksim Shcherbakov; Andriy Kovalenko	Russia; Ukraine	2:07.37	Keiko Fukudome	Japan	2:23.37
Stockholm	Anton Lobanov	Russia	2:06.85	Rikke Moeller Pedersen	Denmark	2:20.39

==== 50 m butterfly ====
Meet	Men			Women		
Meet	Winner	Nationality	Time	Winner	Nationality	Time
Rio de Janeiro	Steffen Deibler	Germany	22.49	Therese Alshammar	Sweden	25.35
Beijing	Roland Schoeman	South Africa	22.72	Therese Alshammar	Sweden	25.48
Singapore	Roland Schoeman	South Africa	22.65	Therese Alshammar	Sweden	25.24
Tokyo	Roland Schoeman	South Africa	22.56	Therese Alshammar	Sweden	25.27
Berlin	Roland Schoeman	South Africa	22.39	Therese Alshammar	Sweden	25.28
Moscow	Nikita Konovalov	Russia	22.87	Therese Alshammar	Sweden	25.43
Stockholm	Roland Schoeman	South Africa	22.49	Therese Alshammar	Sweden	25.30

==== 100 m butterfly ====
Meet	Men			Women		
Meet	Winner	Nationality	Time	Winner	Nationality	Time
Rio de Janeiro	Steffen Deibler	Germany	50.67	Therese Alshammar	Sweden	57.04
Beijing	Kohei Kawamoto	Japan	50.78	Therese Alshammar	Sweden	56.80
Singapore	Steffen Deibler	Germany	50.92	Therese Alshammar	Sweden	56.32
Tokyo	Steffen Deibler	Germany	50.43	Therese Alshammar	Sweden	56.12
Berlin	Evgeny Korotyshkin	Russia	50.75	Dana Vollmer	United States	55.59
Moscow	Evgeny Korotyshkin	Russia	50.99	Therese Alshammar	Sweden	57.09
Stockholm	Lars Frölander	Sweden	51.26	Therese Alshammar	Sweden	55.53

==== 200 m butterfly ====
Meet	Men			Women		
Meet	Winner	Nationality	Time	Winner	Nationality	Time
Rio de Janeiro	Leonardo de Deus	Brazil	1:53.78	Joanna Maranhão	Brazil	2:09.72
Beijing	Thiago Pereira	Brazil	1:56.21	Elaine Breeden	United States	2:05.33
Singapore	Thiago Pereira	Brazil	1:53.90	Elaine Breeden	United States	2:05.44
Tokyo	Takeshi Matsuda	Japan	1:50.64	Elaine Breeden	United States	2:04.54
Berlin	Frederico Castro	Brazil	1:53.65	Elaine Breeden	United States	2:05.38
Moscow	Paweł Korzeniowski	Poland	1:53.91	Elaine Breeden	United States	2:06.36
Stockholm	Daiya Seto	Japan	1:53.57	Elaine Breeden	United States	2:04.26

==== 100 m individual medley ====
Meet	Men			Women		
Meet	Winner	Nationality	Time	Winner	Nationality	Time
Rio de Janeiro	Thiago Pereira	Brazil	52.35	Hinkelien Schreuder	Netherlands	1:00.65
Beijing	Darian Townsend	South Africa	53.27	Hinkelien Schreuder	Netherlands	59.80
Singapore	Thiago Pereira	Brazil	52.73	Julia Smit	United States	1:00.27
Tokyo	Thiago Pereira	Brazil	52.84	Tomoko Hagiwara	Japan	59.94
Berlin	Markus Deibler	Germany	52.17	Hinkelien Schreuder	Netherlands	59.29
Moscow	Thiago Pereira	Brazil	53.12	Hinkelien Schreuder	Netherlands	1:00.17
Stockholm	Sergey Fesikov	Russia	52.81	Hinkelien Schreuder	Netherlands	59.70

==== 200 m individual medley ====
Meet	Men			Women		
Meet	Winner	Nationality	Time	Winner	Nationality	Time
Rio de Janeiro	Thiago Pereira	Brazil	1:52.72	Joanna Maranhão	Brazil	2:12.56
Beijing	Thiago Pereira	Brazil	1:54.21	Ye Shiwen	China	2:08.87
Singapore	Thiago Pereira	Brazil	1:53.45	Julia Smit	United States	2:08.14
Tokyo	Markus Rogan	Austria	1:53.85	Julia Smit	United States	2:08.05
Berlin	Thiago Pereira	Brazil	1:52.81	Julia Smit	United States	2:07.64
Moscow	Thiago Pereira	Brazil	1:54.26	Julia Smit	United States	2:08.56
Stockholm	Darian Townsend	South Africa	1:54.47	Julia Smit	United States	2:07.17

==== 400 m individual medley ====
Meet	Men			Women		
Meet	Winner	Nationality	Time	Winner	Nationality	Time
Rio de Janeiro	Thiago Pereira	Brazil	4:06.47	Joanna Maranhão	Brazil	4:40.20
Beijing	Thiago Pereira	Brazil	4:14.03	Ye Shiwen	China	4:28.67
Singapore	Thiago Pereira	Brazil	4:02.82	Julia Smit	United States	4:28.72
Tokyo	Thiago Pereira	Brazil	4:04.03	Julia Smit	United States	4:27.70
Berlin	Thiago Pereira	Brazil	4:02.83	Julia Smit	United States	4:29.09
Moscow	Thiago Pereira	Brazil	4:07.06	Julia Smit	United States	4:31.45
Stockholm	Thiago Pereira	Brazil	4:04.62	Julia Smit	United States	4:28.59

Legend: WR – World record; (WR) – World record when swum (earning bonus World Cup points); WC – World Cup record; (WC) – World Cup record when swum

== See also ==
- List of World Cup records in swimming
