= Swimming at the 2014 European Aquatics Championships – Men's 1500 metre freestyle =

Men's 1500 metre freestyle at the Swimming at the 2014 European Aquatics Championships
- Dates: 19–20 August
- Competitors: 27 from 15 nations
- Winning time: 14:39.93

Medalists
gold medal	Gregorio Paltrinieri	Italy
silver medal	Pál Joensen	Faroe Islands
bronze medal	Gabriele Detti	Italy

The Men's 1500 metre freestyle competition of the 2014 European Aquatics Championships was held on 19–20 August.

== Records ==
Prior to the competition, the existing world, European and championship records were as follows.

	Name	Nation	Time	Location	Date
World record	Sun Yang	China	14:31.02	London	4 August 2012
European record	Yury Prilukov	Russia	14:41.13	Beijing	15 August 2008
Championship record	Gregorio Paltrinieri	Italy	14:48.92	Debrecen	23 May 2012

== Results ==
=== Heats ===
The heats were held at 10:48.

Rank	Heat	Lane	Name	Nationality	Time	Notes
1	3	4	Gregorio Paltrinieri	Italy	14:54.75	Q
2	2	4	Gabriele Detti	Italy	14:59.24	Q
3	2	3	Stephen Milne	United Kingdom	15:04.86	Q
4	3	5	Gergely Gyurta	Hungary	15:05.13	Q
5	2	6	Jay Lelliott	Great Britain	15:06.88	Q
6	2	8	Richárd Nagy	Slovakia	15:07.29	Q
7	2	5	Pál Joensen	Faroe Islands	15:08.02	Q
8	3	8	Antonio Arroyo	Spain	15:11.86	Q
9	3	2	Jan Micka	Czech Republic	15:13.11	
10	3	0	Anthony Pannier	France	15:17.03	
11	2	0	Anton Ipsen	Denmark	15:17.14	
12	3	7	Damien Joly	France	15:18.11	
13	2	2	Joris Bouchaut	France	15:19.17	
14	2	7	Marc Sánchez	Spain	15:23.61	
15	2	9	Maarten Brzoskowski	Netherlands	15:23.67	
16	3	6	Samuel Pizzetti	Italy	15:32.01	
17	1	5	Maksym Shemberev	Ukraine	15:32.64	
18	1	1	Nezir Karap	Turkey	15:32.65	
19	3	3	Serhiy Frolov	Ukraine	15:33.17	
20	2	1	Gergő Kis	Hungary	15:40.77	
21	1	2	Eetu Piiroinen	Finland	15:43.18	
22	1	4	Lukas Ambros	Austria	15:50.93	
23	1	6	Roman Dmytriyev	Czech Republic	15:51.27	
24	3	1	Pawel Furtek	Poland	15:52.09	
25	3	9	Ediz Yıldırımer	Turkey	15:53.64	
26	1	7	Tomás Novovesky	Czech Republic	15:58.52	
27	1	3	Jan Kutník	Czech Republic	16:09.28	

=== Final ===
The final was held at 18:07.

Rank	Lane	Name	Nationality	Time	Notes
1st place, gold medalist(s)	4	Gregorio Paltrinieri	Italy	14:39.93	ER, CR
2nd place, silver medalist(s)	1	Pál Joensen	Faroe Islands	14:50.59	
3rd place, bronze medalist(s)	5	Gabriele Detti	Italy	14:52.53	
4	3	Stephen Milne	Great Britain	14:53.83	
5	2	Jay Lelliott	Great Britain	14:58.74	
6	6	Gergely Gyurta	Hungary	15:03.26	
7	7	Richárd Nagy	Slovakia	15:11.97	
8	8	Antonio Arroyo	Spain	15:16.21	
