= Matthew Stanley =

New Zealand swimmer (born 1992)

Personal information
- Born: January 15, 1992 (age 34) Matamata, New Zealand

Sport
- Sport: Swimming
Medal record
Representing New Zealand
World Championships (SC)
Bronze medal – third place	2012 Istanbul	400 m freestyle
Summer Universiade
Bronze medal – third place	2011 Shenzhen	4x100m medley relay

Matthew Stanley (born 15 January 1992) is a New Zealand swimmer. His home town is Matamata, where he started swimming at the local swimming club at the age of seven.

== Career ==
In 2011, he competed in the Universiade, winning a bronze medal in the men's 4 x 100 m medley relay.

At the 2012 Summer Olympics he competed in the men's 400 metre freestyle, finishing in 15th place in the heats, failing to reach the final.

At the 2012 World Short Course Swimming Championships Stanley finished fourth in the 400 m freestyle but the third-placed finisher, Mads Glæsner, was subsequently disqualified after a doping infringement and Stanley was promoted to the bronze medal position. He also finished in 6th in the 200 m freestyle.

He broke Danyon Loader's 200 and 400 m freestyle records in the 50 m pool. As of 2024, he also holds the New Zealand men's 200 m freestyle and 200 m backstroke records in the 25 m pool. He was also part of the team that holds the New Zealand men's 4 x 200 m relay record.

At the 2014 Commonwealth Games, he swam in the 200 m and 400 m individual freestyle, and the 4 x 100 m, the 4 x 200 m freestyle relays and 4 x 100 m medley relays.

He competed at the 2015 FINA World Championships.

Following an ankle injury, he competed at the 2016 Olympics.

After a dead heat with Matthew Hutchins at the 2017 New Zealand National Championships, he qualified for the 2017 FINA World Championships.
