= Swimming at the 2011 Commonwealth Youth Games =

Swimming at the IV Commonwealth Youth Games
- Host city: Isle of Man
- Date(s): September 9–11
- Venue(s): National Sports Centre

Swimming will be competed as a medal sport in the 2011 Commonwealth Youth Games in the Isle of Man from September 9 to 11, 2011 in the National Sports Centre. Each Commonwealth Games Association can send up to two athletes per event, including one relay team. In the Games, age limits set by the Fédération Internationale de Natation for world Junior competitions will be followed, according to which the age limit for boys is set to 15–18 years (means swimmers born in 1993, 1994, 1995 and 1996) and for girls its 14–17 years of age (means swimmers born in 1994, 1995, 1996 and 1997).
All swimming events are done in short course meters.

== Results ==
=== Boys' events ===
Event	Gold		Silver		Bronze	
50 m freestyle						
100 m freestyle	Te Haumi Maxwell; Australia (AUS)	48.48	Ieuan Lloyd; Wales (WAL)	49.59	Alisdair Stirling; Scotland (SCO)	49.94
200 m freestyle	Ieuan Lloyd; Wales (WAL)	1:47.28	Matthew Hutchins; New Zealand (NZL)	1:48.53	Jarrod Poort; Australia (AUS)	1:49.32
400 m freestyle						
1500 m freestyle	Jarrod Poort; Australia (AUS)	15:09.19	Matthew Hutchins; New Zealand (NZL)	15:17.91	Eugene Tee; Australia (AUS)	15:21.90
50 m backstroke	Corey Main; New Zealand (NZL)	25.24	Grant Halsall; Isle of Man (IOM)	25.32	Robert Gerlach; Australia (AUS)	25.38
100 m backstroke						
200 m backstroke	Corey Main; New Zealand (NZL)	1:55.44	Grant Halsall; Isle of Man (IOM)	1:57.29	Christopher Van de Sande; South Africa (RSA)	1:59.21
50 m breaststroke						
100 m breaststroke	Craig Benson; Scotland (SCO)	59.63	Tommy Sucipto; Australia (AUS)	1:01.15	Kurt Benjamin; South Africa (RSA)	1:06.37
200 m breaststroke	Craig Benson; Scotland (SCO)	2:11.15	Tommy Sucipto; Australia (AUS)	2:14.27	Kurt Benjamin; South Africa (RSA)	2:20.88
50 m butterfly	Chris Raven; Australia (AUS)	23.80	Hendrick Alberts; South Africa (RSA)	24.46	Alexander Hancock; New Zealand (NZL)	24.47
100 m butterfly	Chris Raven; Australia (AUS)	53.09	Hendrick Alberts; South Africa (RSA)	53.32	Alexander Hancock; New Zealand (NZL)	53.54
200 m butterfly						
200 m individual medley						
400 m individual medley	Matthew Johnson; England (ENG)	4:15.41	Eugene Tee; Australia (AUS)	4:15.84	Martin Vogel; South Africa (RSA)	4:20.55
4×100 m freestyle relay	Te Haumi Maxwell; Tommy Sucipto; Chris Raven; Robert Gerlach; Australia (AUS)	3:20.01	Melako Coker; David Goodride; Aaron Rickhuss; Adam Rowe; England (ENG)	3:20.71	Hendrick Alberts; Zahir Ganmiet; Luke Pendock; Christopher Van de Sande; South Africa (RSA)	3:21.96
4×200 m freestyle relay						
4×100 m medley relay	Te Haumi Maxwell; Tommy Sucipto; Chris Raven; Robert Gerlach; Australia (AUS)	3:20.01	Craig Benson; Joshua Booth; Alisdair Stirling; Mark Szaranek; Scotland (SCO)	3:41.50	Hendrick Alberts; Kurt Benjamin; Luke Pendock; Christopher Van de Sande; South Africa (RSA)	3:46.13

=== Girls' events ===
Event	Gold		Silver		Bronze	
50 m freestyle	Ami Matsuo; Australia (AUS)	25.19	Adelaide Hart; Australia (AUS)	25.22	Marne Erasmus; South Africa (RSA)	25.86
100 m freestyle	Ami Matsuo; Australia (AUS)	54.35	Kotuku Ngawati; Australia (AUS)	54.79	Sophie Smith; England (ENG)	55.78
200 m freestyle						
400 m freestyle	Remy Fairweather; Australia (AUS)	4:06.82	Leah Neale; Australia (AUS)	4:08.00	Sian Morgan; Wales (WAL)	4:09.71
800 m freestyle	Remy Fairweather; Australia (AUS)	8:26.63	Leah Neale; Australia (AUS)	8:36.02	Michelle Weber; South Africa (RSA)	8:38.26
50 m backstroke						
100 m backstroke						
200 m backstroke	Georgia Hohmann; England (ENG)	2:07.73	Phoebe Lenderyou; England (ENG)	2:08.05	Sophia Batchelor; New Zealand (NZL)	2:09.14
50 m breaststroke	Sycerika McMahon; Northern Ireland (NIR)	31.47	Sara Lougher; Wales (WAL)	32.12	Kelly Gunnell; South Africa (RSA)	32.20
100 m breaststroke	Sycerika McMahon; Northern Ireland (NIR)	1:07.93	Kelly Gunnell; South Africa (RSA)	1:08.26	Emily Jones; Scotland (SCO)	1:09.04
200 m breaststroke						
50 m butterfly	Marne Erasmus; South Africa (RSA)	26.56	Sophia Batchelor; New Zealand (NZL)	26.82	Vanessa Puhlmann; Australia (AUS)	27.38
100 m butterfly	Sophia Batchelor; New Zealand (NZL)	58.63	Rachael Kelly; England (ENG)	59.70	Vanessa Puhlmann; Australia (AUS)	59.77
200 m butterfly	Elena Sheridan; England (ENG)	2:09.85	Vanessa Puhlmann; Australia (AUS)	2:11.88	Rachael Kelly; England (ENG)	2:14.12
200 m individual medley	Sophie Smith; England (ENG)	2:12.49	Sycerika McMahon; Northern Ireland (NIR)	2:13.97	Kotuku Ngawati; Australia (AUS)	2:15.12
400 m individual medley						
4×100 m freestyle relay	Kotuku Ngawati; Adelaide Hart; Ami Matsuo; Leah Neale; Australia (AUS)	3:41.57	Shauna Lee; Phoebe Lenderyou; Sophie Smith; Laura Vertigans; England (ENG)	3:45.05	Ellena Jones; Sian Morgan; Siwan Thomas-Howelles; Chloe Tutton; Wales (WAL)	3:46.99
4×200 m freestyle relay	Remy Fairweather; Adelaide Hart; Ami Matsuo; Leah Neale; Australia (AUS)	8:00.11	Ellena Jones; Sian Morgan; Siwan Thomas-Howelles; Chloe Tutton; Wales (WAL)	8:07.35	Fiona Donnelly; Emily Jones; Kirstin McKinley; Rachel Sharples; Scotland (SCO)	8:10.67
4×100 m medley relay						
