= Sophia Batchelor =

New Zealand swimmer

Personal information
- Born: 20 April 1995 (age 31)
Medal record
Women's swimming
Representing New Zealand
Commonwealth Youth Games
Gold medal – first place	2011 Commonwealth Youth Games	100m butterfly
Silver medal – second place	2011 Commonwealth Youth Games	50m butterfly
Bronze medal – third place	2011 Commonwealth Youth Games	200m backstroke
Bronze medal – third place	2011 Commonwealth Youth Games	4 x 100m medley relay

Sophia Batchelor (born 20 April 1995 in Canterbury, New Zealand) is a swimmer and neuroscientist from New Zealand who competed at the 2013 World Aquatics Championships. In 2013, she enrolled at the University of California, Berkeley, moved later to the University of Florida and is working at her PhD in University of Leeds in Cognitive Neuroscience.

At the 2011 Commonwealth Youth Games Batchelor won the gold medal in women's 100m butterfly in 58.63 seconds. She also won a silver medal in the 50m butterfly and bronze medals in the 200m backstroke and 4 × 100 m medley relay.

Batchelor has set over 100 New Zealand records in age-group and open events.

As a scientist specialised in Human Computer Interaction (relating to her neuroscience background with immersive technologies), she was awarded the Nextant Rising Star Prize. "The Nextant Prize is awarded to a person whom others can turn to for inspiration and guidance with their work in immersive technologies."
