= Pál Joensen =

Faroese swimmer (born 1990)

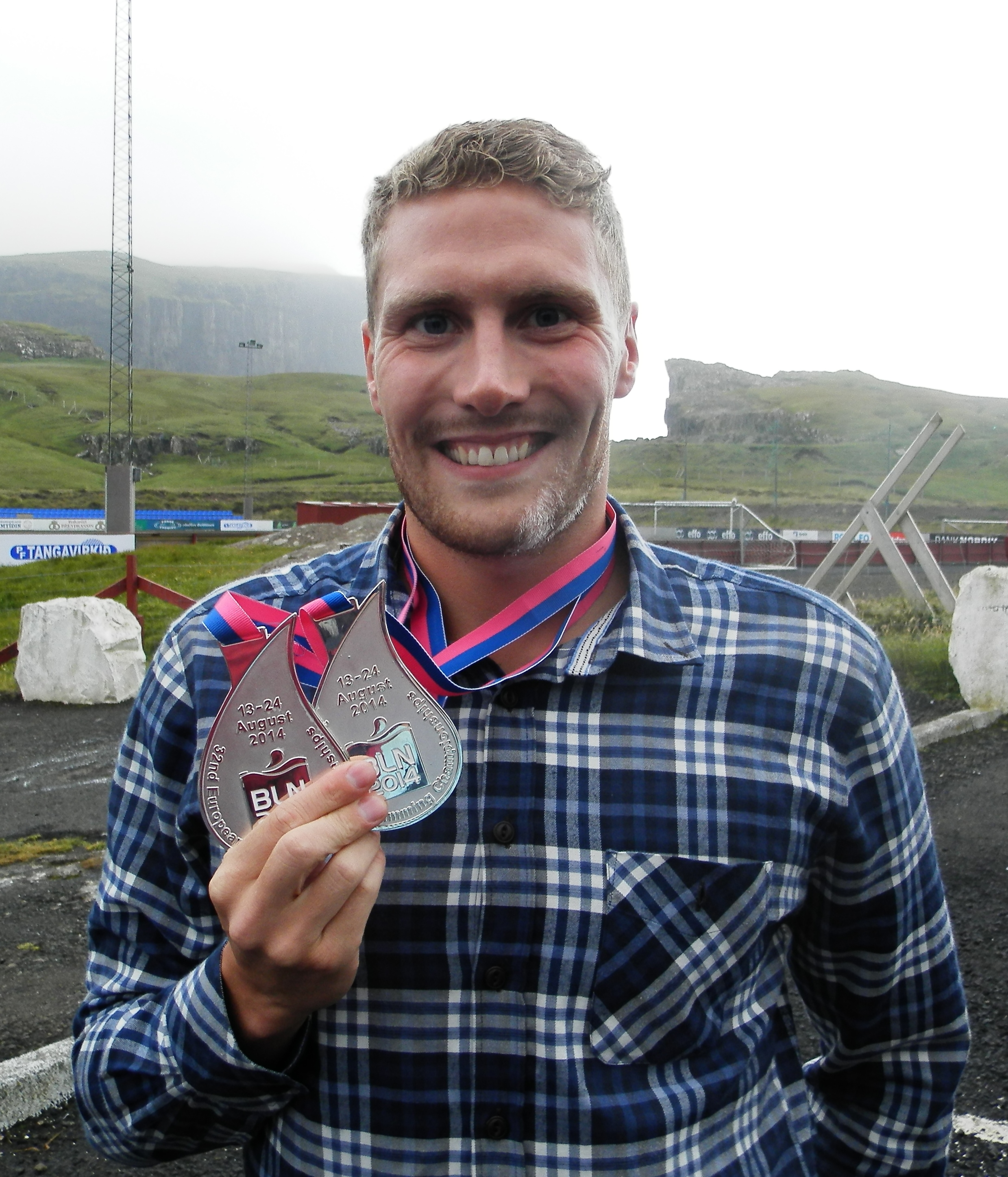
- Joensen in 2014

Personal information
- Nationality: Faroe Islands/Denmark
- Born: 10 December 1990 (age 35) Vágur, Suðuroy, Faroe Islands
- Height: 1.80 m (5 ft 11 in)
- Weight: 75 kg (165 lb)

Sport
- Sport: Swimming
- Strokes: Freestyle
- Club: Aalborg Svømmeklub
Medal record
Representing Faroe Islands
World Championships (SC)
Bronze medal – third place	2012 Istanbul	1500 m freestyle
European Championships (LC)
Silver medal – second place	2010 Budapest	1500 m freestyle
Silver medal – second place	2014 Berlin	800 m freestyle
Silver medal – second place	2014 Berlin	1500 m freestyle
European Championships (SC)
Silver medal – second place	2013 Herning	1500 m freestyle
Island Games
Gold medal – first place	2007 Rhodes	200 m freestyle
Gold medal – first place	2007 Rhodes	400 m freestyle
Gold medal – first place	2007 Rhodes	1500 m freestyle
Gold medal – first place	2007 Rhodes	4×50m freestyle
Gold medal – first place	2007 Rhodes	4×50m medley
Gold medal – first place	2009 Åland	50 m freestyle
Gold medal – first place	2009 Åland	100 m freestyle
Gold medal – first place	2009 Åland	200 m freestyle
Gold medal – first place	2009 Åland	400 m freestyle
Gold medal – first place	2009 Åland	1500 m freestyle
Gold medal – first place	2009 Åland	200 m breaststroke
Gold medal – first place	2009 Åland	4×50 m medley
Gold medal – first place	2009 Åland	50 m butterfly
Gold medal – first place	2011 Isle of Wight	100 m freestyle
Gold medal – first place	2011 Isle of Wight	200 m freestyle
Gold medal – first place	2011 Isle of Wight	400 m freestyle
Gold medal – first place	2011 Isle of Wight	1500 m freestyle
Gold medal – first place	2011 Isle of Wight	200 m breaststroke
Gold medal – first place	2011 Isle of Wight	400 m medley
Gold medal – first place	2011 Isle of Wight	4×50 m freestyle
Gold medal – first place	2011 Isle of Wight	4×100 m freestyle
Gold medal – first place	2011 Isle of Wight	8×50 m freestyle
Silver medal – second place	2009 Åland	100 m medley
Silver medal – second place	2009 Åland	200 m medley
Silver medal – second place	2009 Åland	4×100 m freestyle
Silver medal – second place	2009 Åland	4×100 m medley
Silver medal – second place	2009 Åland	400 m medley
Silver medal – second place	2009 Åland	50 m breaststroke
Silver medal – second place	2011 Isle of Wight	100 m medley
Silver medal – second place	2011 Isle of Wight	200 m medley
Silver medal – second place	2011 Isle of Wight	4×50 m medley
Silver medal – second place	2011 Isle of Wight	4×100 m medley
Bronze medal – third place	2007 Rhodes	4×100 m medley
Bronze medal – third place	2009 Åland	100 m breaststroke
Bronze medal – third place	2009 Åland	200 m butterfly
Bronze medal – third place	2011 Isle of Wight	100 m breaststroke
European Junior Championships (LC)
Gold medal – first place	2008 Belgrade	400 m freestyle
Gold medal – first place	2008 Belgrade	800 m freestyle
Gold medal – first place	2008 Belgrade	1500 m freestyle

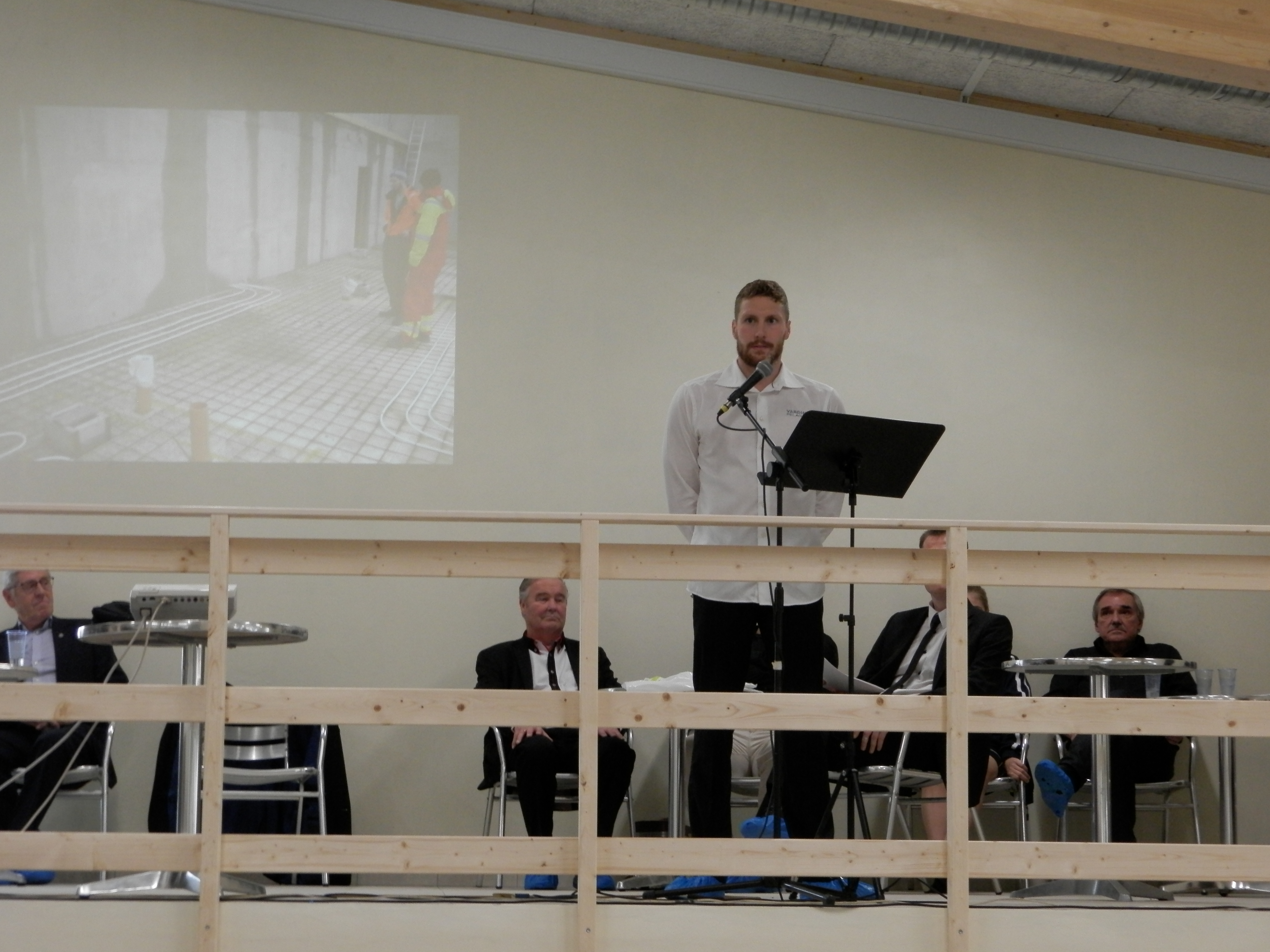
Pál Joensen gave a speech at the opening ceremony of Páls Høll, which is named after him. Páls Høll has the first 50-meter swimming pool in the Faroe Islands, located in his home town Vágur.

Pál Joensen (born 10 December 1990) is a Faroese elite swimmer. He was born in Vágur, Suðuroy, Faroe Islands. He has won World and European Championship medals. His bronze medal in the men's 1500 metre freestyle at the 2012 FINA World Swimming Championships (25 m) in Istanbul was the first medal won by a Faroese swimmer at the World Aquatic Championships.

He competed at the 2012 Summer Olympics for Denmark in three events: 400 metre freestyle, 4 × 200 metre freestyle relay and 1500 metre freestyle. As a Faroese athlete, he competed for Denmark as the Faroe Islands do not have a separate Olympic body.

Joensen holds many of the national swimming records for the Faroe Islands; and these records are not only in freestyle. In short course swimming he holds most of the records in breaststroke, butterfly and individual medley too.

== Personal life ==
Born in the Faroe Islands, he moved to Copenhagen in August 2012, where he swims at the Danish National Training Centre. He is now swimming for Aalborg Svømmeklub and for the Faroe Islands. While in the Faroe Islands he had to train in a 25 m short course pool, because there was no 50 m pool in the Faroe Islands. He was training with Susvim (Susvim is short for Suðuroyar Svimjifelag, which means Suduroy Swimming Club). His trainer in the Faroe Islands was Jón Bjarnason.

== International swimming career ==
=== FINA World Championships 2007 ===
At the 2007 World Aquatics Championships in Melbourne, Australia, Joensen competed in five individual events – 50 m, 100 m, 200 m, 400 m, 800 metre freestyle, and 1500 metre freestyle. He did not proceed past the heats stage in any of the events.

=== Island Games 2007 ===
Pál Joensen won five gold medals and one bronze medal at the 2007 Island Games in Rhodes.

- Men's 200 m freestyle, gold, 1:53.60
- Men's 400 m freestyle, gold, 4:00.23
- Men's 1500 m freestyle, gold, 15:48.25
- Men's 4×50 m freestyle relay, gold, 1:36.01
- Men's 4×50 m medley relay, gold, 1:47.71
- Men's 4×100 m medley relay, bronze, 4:00.38

=== European Junior Swimming Championship 2008 ===
Pál Joensen won 3 gold medals at the 2008 European Junior Swimming Championships in Belgrade. Pál won the gold medals in 400 metre, 800 metre, and 1500 metre freestyle.

- 400 m (3:51.44)
- 800 m (7:56.90)
- 1500 m (15:18.37)

=== Island Games 2009 ===
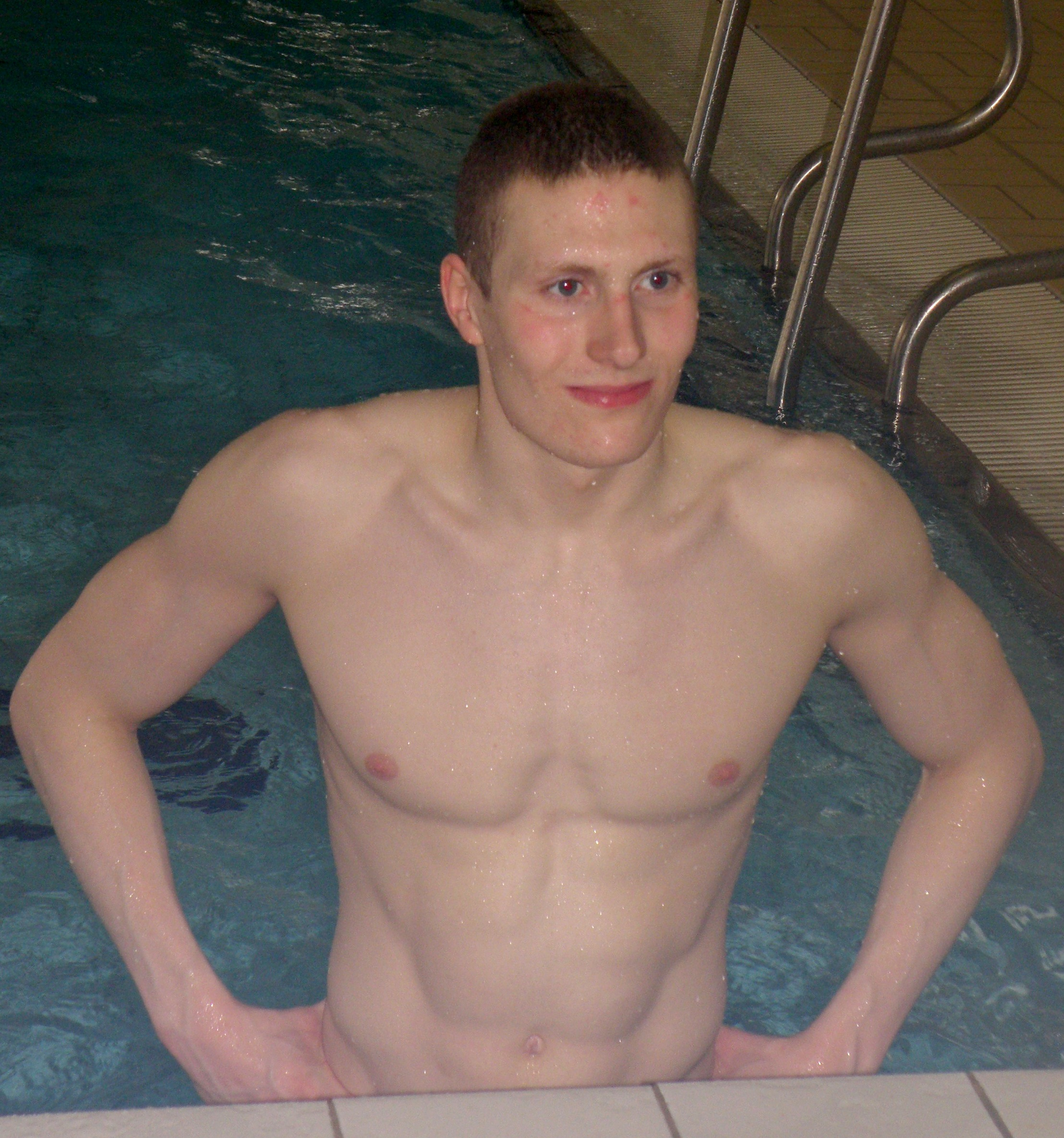
Joensen in 2009

Pál Joensen won gold and set several Faroese records at the 2009 Island Games in Åland:

- Men's 100 m freestyle, gold, 50.04
- Men's 1500 m freestyle, gold, 15.44.68
- Men's 200 m breaststroke, gold, 2:16.06
- Men's 200 m freestyle, gold, 1:47.76
- Men's 400 m freestyle, gold, 3:45.87
- Men's 50 m freestyle, gold, 23.19 (Tie)
- Men's 4 x 50 m medley relay, gold, 1:44.77 (together with Høvdanum, Mohr and Thomsen)
- Men's 50 m butterfly, gold, 25.62
- Men's 100 m individual medley, silver, 57.66
- Men's 200 m individual medley, silver, 2:04.41
- Men's 4 × 100 m freestyle relay, silver, 3:27.14
- Men's 4 × 100 m medley relay, silver, 3:49.65 (together with Høvdanum, Mohr and Thomsen)
- Men's 400 m individual medley, silver, 4:26.18
- Men's 50 m breaststroke, silver, 29.72
- Men's 100 m breaststroke, bronze, 1:05.50
- Men's 200 m butterfly, bronze, 2:05.81

=== FINA World Championships 2009 ===
At the 2009 World Aquatics Championships in Rome, Italy, Joensen competed in all three events – 400 m, 800 m, and 1500 m. He did not proceed past the heats stage in any of the events. Joensen finished in 17th in the 1500 metre freestyle with a time of 15.21.37 m, 18th in 800 metre freestyle with a time of 8:01.50, and 22nd in the 400 metre freestyle with a time of 3:48.93.

=== FINA World Cup 2009 in Moscow ===
At the World Cup in Moscow, on 7 November 2009, Pál Joensen won the men's 1500 metre freestyle (14:32.64) short course (25 m), beating his own national record of 14:39.99 set in December 2008. He also broke the Nordic record, which was set by the Dane Mads Glæsner at the World Cup in Stockholm 2008.

=== FINA World Cup 2009 in Stockholm ===
At the World Cup in Stockholm, on 11 November 2009, Pál Joensen won silver in the men's 1500 metre freestyle short course (25 m); his time was 14:32.59, which was new Nordic record. He broke his own record, which he sat 4 days earlier in Moscow.

=== FINA World Cup 2009 in Berlin ===
On 15 November 2009, Pál Joensen won silver in the men's 1500 metre freestyle short course (25 m) at the World Cup 2009 in Berlin. His time was 14:32.15, which was new Nordic record, breaking his own record, which he sat 4 days earlier at the World Cup in Stockholm.

=== European Short Course Swimming Championships 2009 ===
Pál Joensen participated in the European Short Course Swimming Championships in Istanbul, 2009, in 400 metre freestyle and 1500 metre freestyle. Joensen qualified for the final in the 400 metre freestyle, but did not participate in the final. Joensen swam in the 1500 metre freestyle final, finishing in 7th place; his time was 14:38.00. The gold medallist in the race was Jan Wolfgarten, from Germany, who swam a time of 14:20.44, silver was won by Federico Colbertaldo, from Italy, and the bronze medal by Mads Glæsner, from Denmark. Glæsner swam with a time of 14:26.74, which was new Nordic Record, breaking Joensen's record. Joensen recaptured the Nordic record in the men's 1500 metre freestyle on Short Course in November 2009, but in Istanbul in December 2009 Glæsner beat Joensen's Nordic Record.

=== Gold and Bronze at the Telkom SA National Aquatic Championships 2010 in Durban ===
Pál Joensen participated in the long course 800 metre freestyle and 1500 metre freestyle for men in Durban at the Telkom SA National Aquatic Championships 2010. He won gold in 800 metre freestyle with the time of 7:58.92. Chad Ho, from South Africa, was number two with the time of 8:09.04, and John Ellis, from South Africa, was number three with the time of 8:14.99. A few days later, on 17 April 2010, Joensen swam in the final in 1500 metre freestyle for men; he was number three with the time of 15:21.84. The winner was Heerden Herman, from South Africa, with the time of 15:06.75, and number two was Mark B. Randall with the time of 15:09.75.

=== Great London Swim 2010 – Elite Races ===
Pál Joensen participated in the British Gas Great London Swim 2010, which was held on 3 July 2010. He came finished fourth with a time of 16:47.45. The winner was Thomas Lurz, from Germany, with the time of 16:42.57. Number two was Ky Hurst, from Australia, and number three was Petar Stoichev, from Bulgaria. This was the first time Pál Joensen tried to compete in open water swimming; he normally competes in indoors swimming pools.

=== 2010 European Aquatics Championships – Silver Winner ===
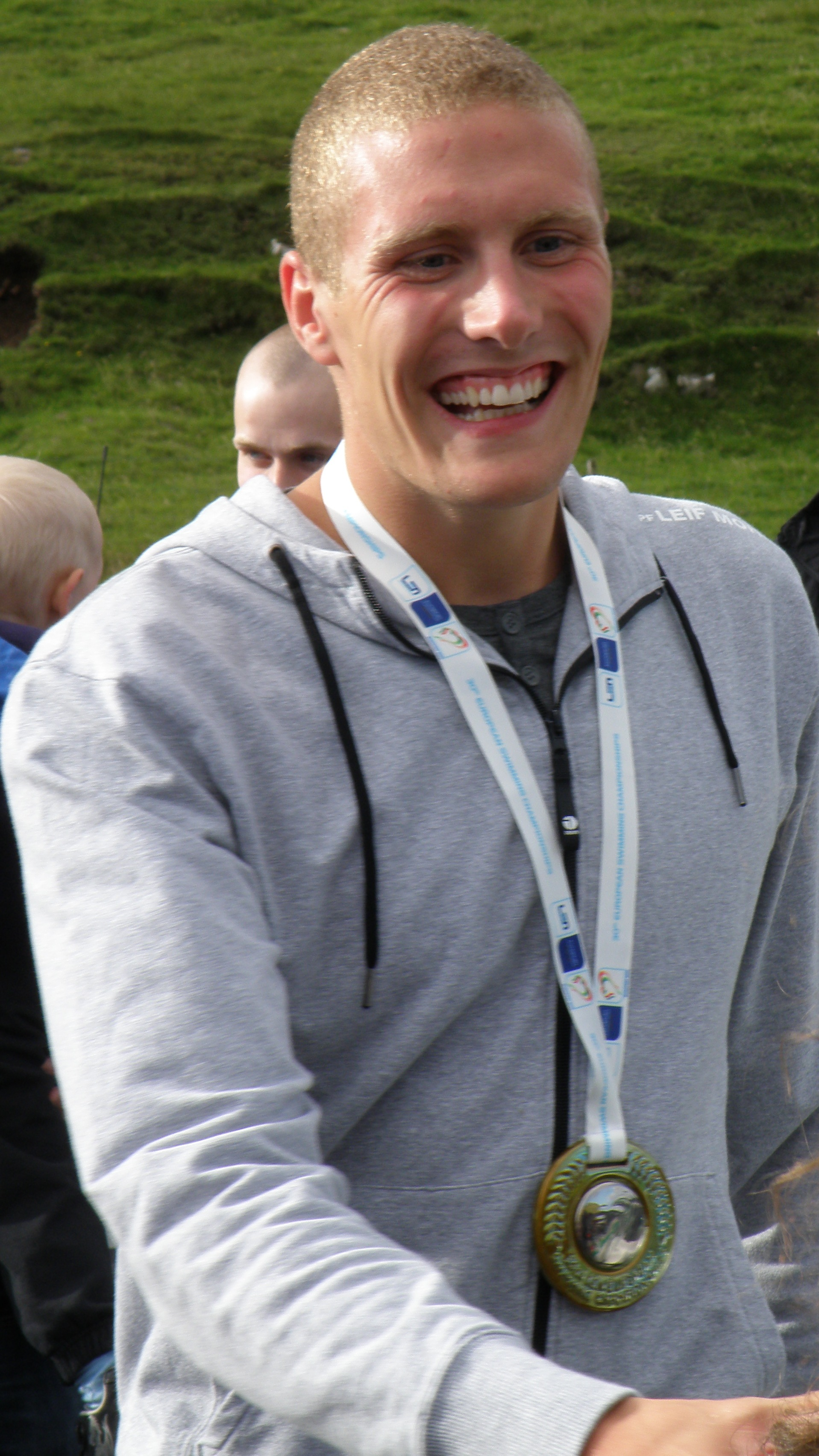
Pál Joensen with the silver medal from the European Aquatics Championships 2010

Pál Joensen participated in the 2010 European Aquatics Championships in Budapest. On 10 August 2010, in the heats of the men's 1500 metre freestyle, he qualified for the final with the second best time, which was 15:04.05. Samuel Pizzetti, from Italy, swam with the best time, 15:03.32. The final was on 11 August 2010. Sébastien Rouault, from France, won gold, and Pál Joensen won silver; he swam his best time ever (14:56.90) and set a new Nordic record. Gold, silver and bronze winners all swam managed to swim sub-15:00 minutes. The results for the three first swimmers:

- 1 Sébastien Rouault, France, 14:55.17
- 2 Pál Joensen, Faroe Islands, 14:56.90
- 3 Samuel Pizzetti, Italy, 14:59.76

=== FINA World Cup 2010 in Berlin ===
Pál Joensen won two silver medals at the World Cup in Berlin in October 2010. On 30 October 2010, he won silver in the men's 400 metre freestyle (on short course); his time was 3:44.45. The winner was the German swimmer Paul Biedermann, who swam a time of 3:42.31. On 31 October 2010, Joensen won silver in the men's 1500 metre freestyle (on short course) with the time of 14:47.39. The winner was Job Kienhuis, from the Netherlands; he swam a time of 14:40.11.

=== FINA World Cup 2010 in Moscow ===
Pál Joensen won two gold medals in Moscow at the 2010 FINA Swimming World Cup. In the short course 400 metre freestyle, on 2 November 2010, he won with a time of 3:45.56. The silver medallist was the Russian Evgeny Kulikov with the time of 3:45.83, and Alexandr Selin won bronze with the time of 3:46.29. The following day, on 3 November 2010, Joensen won gold in the men's 1500 metre freestyle with a time of 14:50.66. The Russian Sergey Bolshakov won silver with a time of 14:53.85, and Sergiy Frolov, from Ukraine, won bronze with the time of 14:54.27.

=== FINA World Cup 2010 in Stockholm ===
Pál Joensen swam in the final of the men's 400 metre freestyle at the 2010 FINA Swimming World Cup in Stockholm on 6 November 2010. He won bronze by swimming 3:46.13. Paul Biedermann, from Germany, took gold in the time of 3:41.27, and Yannick Agnel, from France, won silver in the time of 3:41.42.

=== 2011 Island Games on Isle of Wight ===
Pál Joensen participated in 15 swimming events at the 2011 Islands Games on Isle of Wight in the period 25 June to 1 July 2011. Joensen won 8 gold, 4 silver and 1 bronze medals.

- Men's 100 m freestyle, gold, 51.16
- Men's 200 m freestyle, gold, 1:49.83
- Men's 400 m freestyle, gold, 3:54.02
- Men's 1500 m freestyle, gold, 15:28.85
- Men's 400 m medley, gold, 4:23.10
- Men's 200 m breast, gold, 2:15.96
- Men's 4×50 m freestyle (relay), gold 1:33.59 (the others were Magnus Jákupsson, Heðin Lisberg Olsen and Pauli Øssursson Mohr
- Men's 4 × 100 m freestyle, relay, gold, 3:23.10
- Men's 100 m medley, individual, silver, 58.81
- Men's 200 m medley, individual, silver, 2:03.18
- Men's 4×50 m medley, relay, silver, 1:43.23
- Men's 4 × 100 m medley, relay, silver, 3:47.81
- Men's 100 m breast, bronze, 1:03.78

=== 2011 World Championship ===
In July 2011 Pál Joensen participated in 800 metre and 1500 metre freestyle at the 2011 World Aquatics Championships in Shanghai. On 26 July, he made it to the finals in 800 metre freestyle with the second best time 7:45.55, which was new Faroese and Nordic record. On 27 July, he swam in the final, and was 5th with the time of 7:46.51. On 30 July, he swam in the second heat in the men's 1500 metre freestyle, he swam with the sixth best time of all the heats (14:56.66), which was new Nordic and Faroese record and 15 seconds under the qualification time for the Olympic Games 2012. On the following day, 31 July 2011, Pál Joensen swam in the final. He was fourth, he swam in the time of 14:46.33, improving the Nordic and Faroese records from the day before by more than 10 seconds. Joensen qualified for the 2012 Summer Olympics, fulfilling a career dream, by swimming 25 seconds under the qualification time, which was 15:11.83. He swam for Denmark at the Olympics, because the Faroe Islands are not recognized as an independent country and therefore the islands can't participate at the Olympics.

=== 2011 FINA Swimming World Cup ===
On 15 and 16 October 2011, Pál Joensen participated in two events in World Cup in Stockholm, Sweden. He won gold in the men's 1500 metre freestyle in the time of 14:52.00, and bronze in the men's 400 metre freestyle in the time of 3:45.50.

=== 2011 European Short Course Swimming Championships ===
In December 2011 Joensen participated in the 2011 European Short Course Swimming Championships, which was held in Szczecin, in Poland. He qualified for the finals in 400 metre freestyle with the time of 3:42.37. In the final, he was fourth, in a time of 3:41.05. Joensen swam in the fastest heat in the men's 1,500 metre freestyle, and in the final he was 5th, with a time of 14:37.83.

=== 2012 Danish Open ===
In March 2012 Joensen participated in Danish Open in Bellahøj, in Denmark. On 22 March 2012, he won gold in 400 metre freestyle in the time of 3:46.84, which was new Faroese record. He also qualified for the 2012 Olympics in 400 metre freestyle, having already qualified in the 1500 metre freestyle. On 23 March 2012, he won gold in the men's 200 metre freestyle with the time of 1:48.98, which was new Faroese record.

- Gold in 200 m freestyle with the time of 1:48.98 (New Faroese record)
- Gold in 400 m freestyle with the time of 3:46.84 (New Faroese record)
- Gold in 1500 m freestyle with the time of 15:04.39

=== 2012 Summer Olympics in London ===
Pál Joensen competed at the 2012 Summer Olympics in London in three events: 400 metre freestyle, 4 x 200 metre freestyle relay, and 1500 metre freestyle. He competes for Denmark at the 2012 Summer Olympics; the Faroe Islands can't participate at the Olympics. His results:

- 10th in the men's 400 m freestyle with the time 3:47.36
- 13th in the men's 4 × 200 m freestyle relay (with Daniel Skaaning, Anders Lie and Mads Glæsner. The team set a new Danish record in the event)
- Nr. 17 in the men's 1500 m freestyle

=== 2012 FINA World Swimming Championships on Short Course ===
In December 2012 Joensen competed at the World Swimming Championships on short course in Istanbul. On 14 December, he competed in the men's final in 400 metre freestyle. He placed 6th in a time of 3:42.23. On the last day, 16 December 2012, he competed in the men's 1500 metre freestyle. He originally took bronze in the time of 14:36.93; the Danish swimmer Mads Glæsner won in the time of 14:30.01, and Italian Gregorio Paltrinieri took silver in the time of 14:31.13. Drug testing later revealed that Glæsner committed a doping violation at the meet, and was stripped of his medals in Istanbul in June 2013, elevating Joensen to silver in the 1500 m.

However, upon appeal to the Court of Arbitration for Sport, Glaesner's 1500 metre freestyle gold medal was reinstated based on the fact that a test after that race, two days after his initial positive test following the 400 metre free, was clean. He still forfeited the 400 metre freestyle bronze, which he did not appeal. This means that Joensen's medal position was returned to bronze.

Joensen's bronze medal was his first medal from a World Championship, it is also the first time a swimmer from the Faroe Islands has won a medal at a World Championship in swimming.

=== 2013 European Short Course Swimming Championships in Herning ===
Joensen participated at the 2013 European Short Course Swimming Championships in Herning. He won a silver medal in the men's 1500 metre freestyle.

- Silver in 1500 m freestyle with the time of 14:35.99
- 21st in 400 m freestyle with the time of 3:45.92
- 26th in 200 m freestyle with the time of 1:47.03

=== 100 individual Gold Medals at the Faroese Swimming Championships ===
In May 2014 Joensen first won his 100th gold medal in individual swimming competitions. A few minutes later, he won one more gold medal, reaching 101 individual gold medals won in the Faroese Championships. He won 15 gold and one silver at the 2014 Faroese Swimming Championship.

=== 2014 Bergen Swim Festival ===
- Gold in 400 m freestyle with the time of 3:45.45

=== 2014 Mare Nostrum International Swimming Meeting of Monte Carlo ===
- Silver in 400 m freestyle with the time of 3:50.41

=== 2014 European Aquatics Championship 2014 in Berlin ===
Pál Joensen competed at the 2014 European Aquatics Championships in Berlin in August 2014. He competed in 1500 metre freestyle and in 800 metre freestyle. On 20 August, he took silver in 1500 metre freestyle in the time of 14:50.59. The winner was Gregorio Paltrinieri, who sat new European record in the time of 14:39.93.

- Silver in 1500 m freestyle with the time of 14:50.59
- Silver in 800 m freestyle with the time of 7:48.49

=== 2014 FINA World Swimming Championships on Short Course ===
- 4th in 1500 m freestyle with the time of 14:26.54, which was Faroese and Nordic record
- 17th in 400 m freestyle with the time of 3:42.31

== Honours ==
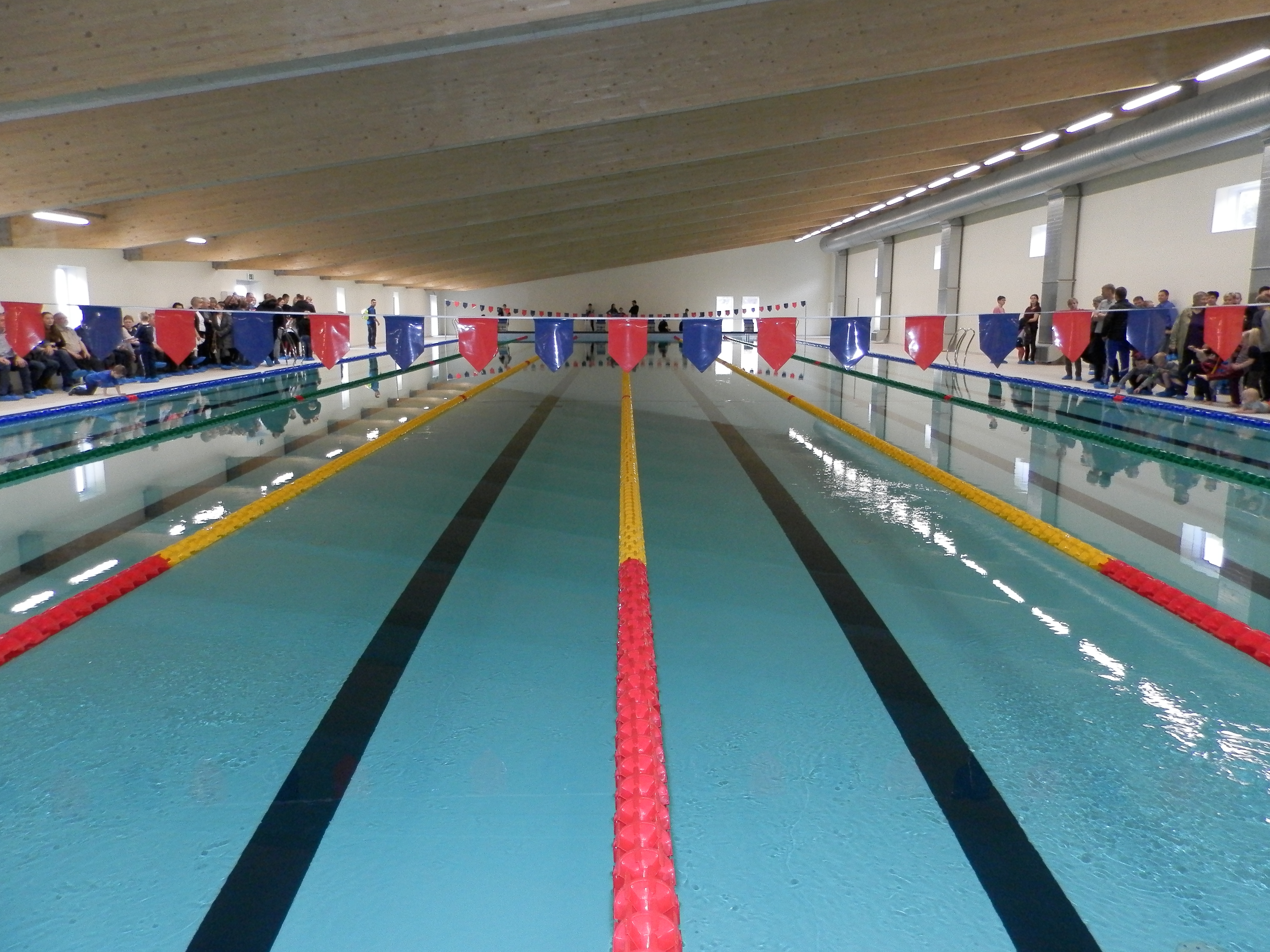
The 50-meter pool in Pál Høll on the opening day, 17 October 2015

- 2015 – Páls Høll, which is the first 50-meter swimming pool in the Faroe Islands, was named after him.
- 2013 – Sportsperson of the Year, chosen by Kringvarp Føroya (no award was given from 2010 to 2012)
- 2009 – Sportsperson of the Year, chosen by the National Radio and Television Station of the Faroe Islands, Kringvarp Føroya
- 2008 – Sportsperson of the Year, chosen by Kringvarp Føroya
- 2007 – Sportsperson of the Year, chosen by Kringvarp Føroya
