= Stephen Milne (swimmer) =

Scottish swimmer

Personal information
- Nationality: Great Britain; Scotland
- Born: 29 April 1994 (age 32) Inverness, Scotland
- Height: 6 ft 1 in (185 cm)
- Weight: 168 lb (76 kg)

Sport
- Sport: Swimming
- Strokes: Freestyle 200m
Medal record
Men's swimming
Representing Great Britain
Olympic Games
Silver medal – second place	2016 Rio de Janeiro	4×200 m freestyle
World Championships (LC)
Gold medal – first place	2017 Budapest	4x200 m freestyle
European Championships (LC)
Gold medal – first place	2018 Glasgow	4×200 m freestyle
Bronze medal – third place	2018 Glasgow	4×200m mixed freestyle
Representing Scotland
Commonwealth Games
Silver medal – second place	2014 Glasgow	4×200 m freestyle
Bronze medal – third place	2018 Gold Coast	4×100 m freestyle
Bronze medal – third place	2018 Gold Coast	4×200 m freestyle
Bronze medal – third place	2022 Birmingham	4×200 m freestyle
Bronze medal – third place	2022 Birmingham	4×100 m medley

Stephen Milne (born 29 April 1994) is a Scottish swimmer who competed at the 2016 Summer Olympics in Rio de Janeiro, Brazil.

== Personal life ==
Milne was born on 29 April 1994 in Inverness, Scotland, United Kingdom. He went to school at Perth Academy and is now studying at Perth College, University of the Highlands and Islands, for a Bachelor of Science degree in Environmental Science.

== Swimming ==
Milne competed at the 2012 European Junior Swimming Championships, held in Antwerp, Belgium. He finished eighth in the 200-metre freestyle and was part of the British team that placed fourth in the 4 × 200-metre freestyle relay.

He competed at the 2014 European Aquatics Championships held in Berlin, Germany, reaching the final in the 400-metre freestyle, 800-metre freestyle and the 1500 metre freestyle, placing fourth in the latter with a new personal best. At the 2014 Commonwealth Games in Glasgow, Scotland he represented the host nation. In the 400-metre freestyle he won his heat in a time of three minutes 46.48 seconds to advance to the final, where he finished eighth. In the 1500 metre freestyle he was second in his heat behind Canadian Ryan Cochrane and qualified for the final where he finished fifth. In the final of the 4 × 200-metre freestyle relay he competed alongside Daniel Wallace, Duncan Scott and Robert Renwick as the Scottish quartet won the silver medal behind Australia.

In January 2015 he travelled to Perth, Australia, to complete warm weather training. At the 2015 World Aquatics Championships in Kazan, Russia, he placed seventh in the final of the 800-metre freestyle and fifth in the 1500 metre freestyle. He won the silver in the 400 metres freestyle at the 2016 British Championships, setting a new personal best time of three minutes 46.53 seconds in the final. He also won the silver medal in the 1500 metres freestyle.

Milne was selected as part of the 26-member swimming squad for the Great Britain team at the 2016 Summer Olympics held in Rio de Janeiro, Brazil where he competed in the men's 400-metre and 1500 metre freestyle events, finishing 13th and 10th respectively. He also competed in the 4 × 200 m freestyle relay with James Guy, Duncan Scott, and Dan Wallace, and won a silver.

In 2017 at the World Championships in Budapest, he won gold in the 4 × 200 m freestyle event with Guy, Scott and Nick Grainger.

At the 2018 Commonwealth Games held at the Gold Coast, Australia, Milne won two bronzes as part of the Scottish team that finished third in the Men's 4 × 100 m and 4 × 200 m freestyle events.

At the 2018 European Championships, Milne won bronze as part of the team that won mixed 4 × 200 metre freestyle relay, a new event at the game. He was also part of the team that won gold in men's 4 × 200 m freestyle relay, he swam in the heats but not in the final.

== Career best times ==
=== Long course (50-meter pool) ===
Event	Time	Venue
100m Freestyle	49.99	Aberdeen
200m Freestyle	1:46.70	Rio de Janeiro
400m Freestyle	3:46.00	Rio de Janeiro
800m Freestyle	7:46.41	Kazan
1500m Freestyle	14:53.83	Berlin
4 × 200 m Freestyle Relay	07:01.70	Budapest

=== Short course (25m pool) ===
Event	Time	Venue
100m Freestyle	47.66	Edinburgh
200m Freestyle	1:43.63	Edinburgh
400m Freestyle	3:40.19	Edinburgh
800m Freestyle	7:58.16	Dundee
1500m Freestyle	14:36.55	Edinburgh
