= Egor Degtyarev =

Russian swimmer

Sport
- Sport: Swimming
- Strokes: Freestyle

Egor Degtyarev is a Russian swimmer. At the 2012 Summer Olympics, he competed in the Men's 400 metre freestyle, finishing in 20th place in the heats, failing to reach the final.
