= Pol Arias =

Andorran swimmer (born 1996)

Personal information
- Full name: Pol Arias Dourdet
- Born: 8 August 1996 (age 29) Andorra
- Height: 175 cm (5 ft 9 in)
- Weight: 80 kg (176 lb)

Sport
- Sport: Swimming

Pol Arias Dourdet (born 8 August 1996) is an Andorran swimmer. He competed in the men's 400 metre freestyle event at the 2016 Summer Olympics.
