= Hao Yun =

Chinese swimmer (born 1995)

Personal information
- Born: 23 June 1995 (age 31) Hebei, China
- Height: 185 cm (6 ft 1 in) (2012)
- Weight: 80 kg (176 lb) (2012)
Medal record
Men's swimming
Representing China
Olympic Games
Bronze medal – third place	2012 London	4×200 m freestyle
World Championships (LC)
Bronze medal – third place	2013 Barcelona	4×200 m freestyle
World Championships (SC)
Silver medal – second place	2012 Istanbul	400 m freestyle

Hao Yun (Chinese: 郝运; pinyin: Hǎo Yùn; born 23 June 1995 in Hebei) is a Chinese swimmer. At the 2012 Summer Olympics, he competed in the Men's 400 metre freestyle as the only teenager, finishing in 4th place in the final.

== Personal bests (long course) ==
As of September 30, 2014.

Event	Time	Meet	Date	Note(s)
200 m freestyle	1.47.48	2012 Chinese National Swimming Championships	April 6, 2012	
400 m freestyle	3.44.87	2013 National Games of China	September 4, 2013	

== See also ==
- China at the 2012 Summer Olympics - Swimming
