= Matthew Hutchins =

New Zealand swimmer

Personal information
- Born: September 19, 1994 (age 32) Blenheim, New Zealand

Sport
- Sport: Swimming
- Strokes: Medley
- Club: Wharenui Swim Club

Matthew Hutchins (born 19 September 1994) is a New Zealand swimmer who qualified to compete at the 2016 Summer Olympics to be held in Rio de Janeiro, Brazil, in the men's 400 metre freestyle.

== Personal life ==
Hutchins was born on 19 September 1994 in Blenheim, New Zealand, and educated at Lincoln High School, near Christchurch. He attends the University of Wisconsin–Madison in the United States on a scholarship. He has an older sister, Laura.

== Career ==
Hutchins is a member of the Wharenui Swim Club. He competed at the 2011 Commonwealth Youth Games held in the Isle of Man, where he won four medals in the swimming events. Hutchins took the gold medal in the 400 metre freestyle, silver medals in both the 200 metre freestyle and the 1500 metre freestyle events, and was part of the New Zealand team that won the bronze medal in the 4 × 200 metre freestyle relay.

Hutchins represented the Wisconsin Badgers at the 2016 NCAA Division I swimming championships held in Atlanta, Georgia winning a bronze medal in the 1,650 yards (1,510 m) freestyle event, improving his personal best by five seconds in the process. During the meet he also beat his previous personal best time in the 500 yards (460 m) freestyle, in which he placed sixth with a school record time of 4 minutes 13.35 seconds. He won All-American honours in both disciplines.

At the 2016 Canadian Olympic Trials held in Toronto, Ontario, the second official trial for New Zealand swimmers to meet the qualifying times for 2016 Summer Olympics, Hutchins completed his heat of the 400 metre freestyle event in a time of three minutes 49.84 seconds, over half a second faster than the FINA A qualifying standard for Rio. He beat the qualifying standard again during the B Final of the event, which he won in a time of three minutes 50.12 seconds.

On 15 April 2016, Hutchins was named as one of five Olympic debutants in a squad of eight swimmers to represent New Zealand at the 2016 Summer Olympics in Rio de Janeiro, Brazil. He competed in the men's 400 metre freestyle but did not advance beyond his heat. Hutchins now works as a swim coach at Wharenui Swim Club in Christchurch.
