= Florian Vogel (swimmer) =

German swimmer

Personal information
- Born: 2 September 1994 (age 30); Bayreuth, Germany
- Height: 180 cm (5 ft 11 in)
- Weight: 70 kg (154 lb)

Sport
- Sport: Swimming

Florian Vogel (born 2 September 1994 in Bayreuth) is a German swimmer. At the 2016 Summer Olympics in Rio de Janeiro, Vogel placed 9th in the heats of the 400 metre freestyle and did not qualify for the final. He also competed as a member of the 4 x 200 freestyle relay team which finished in 6th place.
