= Qiu Ziao =

Chinese swimmer (born 1998)

Personal information
- Native name: 邱 子傲
- Nationality: Chinese
- Born: 30 August 1998 (age 27)

Sport
- Sport: Swimming
Medal record
Asian Games
Silver medal – second place	2018 Jakarta	4×200 m freestyle

Qiu Ziao (Chinese: 邱 子傲, born 30 August 1998) is a Chinese swimmer. He competed in the men's 400 metre freestyle event at the 2016 Summer Olympics.
