= Filip Zaborowski =

Polish swimmer

Personal information
- Born: 25 July 1994 (age 31) Gdynia, Poland
- Height: 1.88 m (6 ft 2 in)
- Weight: 77 kg (170 lb)

Sport
- Sport: Swimming
Medal record
Men's swimming
Representing Poland
Military World Games
Bronze medal – third place	2019 Wuhan	4×200 m freestyle
Universiade
Bronze medal – third place	2019 Naples	800 m freestyle

Filip Zaborowski (born 25 July 1994) is a Polish swimmer. He competed in the men's 400 metre freestyle event at the 2016 Summer Olympics.
