= Uladzimir Zhyharau =

Belarusian swimmer

Personal information
- Full name: Uladzimir Henadzievich Zhyharau
- Nationality: Belarus
- Born: 12 June 1992 (age 34) Minsk, Belarus
- Height: 1.86 m (6 ft 1 in)
- Weight: 78 kg (172 lb)

Sport
- Sport: Swimming
- Strokes: Freestyle

Uladzimir Henadzievich Zhyharau (Belarusian: Уладзімір Генадзьевіч Жыгараў; born June 12, 1992, in Minsk) is a Belarusian swimmer, who specialized in long-distance freestyle events. Zhyharau qualified for the men's 1500 m freestyle, as a member of the Belarusian swimming team, at the 2012 Summer Olympics in London, by attaining a B-standard entry time of 15:28.22. He challenged six other swimmers on the first heat, including 17-year-old Jan Micka of the Czech Republic and two-time Olympian Ediz Yıldırımer of Turkey. Zhyharau finished the heat in sixth place by nearly fourteen seconds behind Bulgaria's Ventsislav Aydarski, recording the second-slowest time of 15:48.67. Zhyharau failed to advance into the final, as he placed thirtieth overall in the preliminaries.
