= Paul Biedermann =

German swimmer (born 1986)

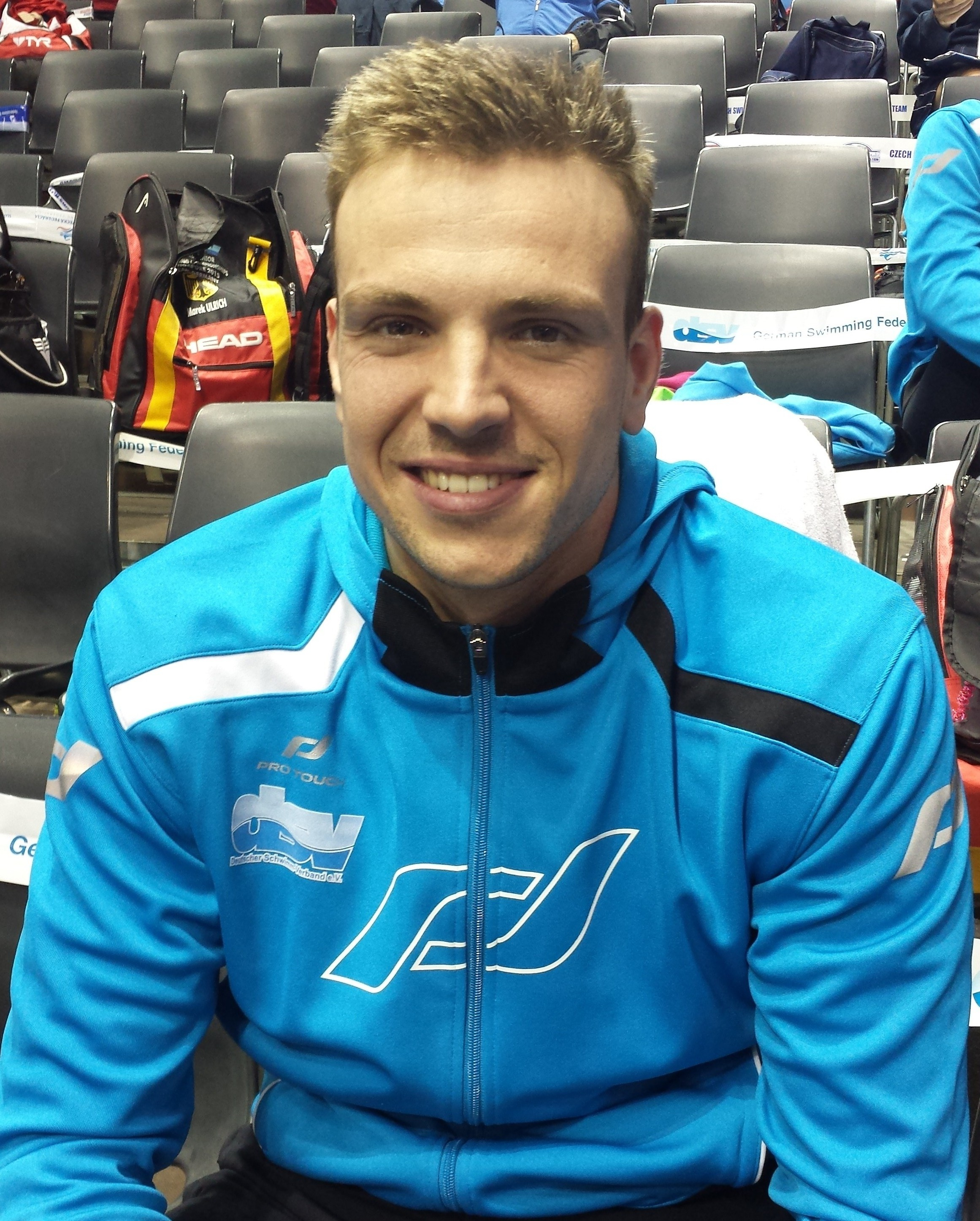
- Biedermann in Netanya, Israel, 2015

Personal information
- Full name: Paul Biedermann
- Nickname: "Superman"
- National team: Germany
- Born: 7 August 1986 (age 40) Halle, East Germany
- Height: 1.93 m (6 ft 4 in)
- Weight: 93 kg (205 lb)
- Website: N/A

Sport
- Sport: Swimming
- Strokes: Freestyle
- Club: SV Halle
- Coach: Frank Embacher
Medal record
Men's swimming
Representing Germany
World Championships (LC)
Gold medal – first place	2009 Rome	200 m freestyle
Gold medal – first place	2009 Rome	400 m freestyle
Silver medal – second place	2009 Rome	4×100 m medley
Bronze medal – third place	2011 Shanghai	200 m freestyle
Bronze medal – third place	2011 Shanghai	400 m freestyle
Bronze medal – third place	2011 Shanghai	4×100 m medley
Bronze medal – third place	2015 Kazan	200 m freestyle
World Championships (SC)
Gold medal – first place	2010 Dubai	400 m freestyle
Gold medal – first place	2012 Istanbul	400 m freestyle
Silver medal – second place	2012 Istanbul	200 m freestyle
Bronze medal – third place	2012 Istanbul	4×200 m freestyle
European Championships (LC)
Gold medal – first place	2008 Eindhoven	200 m freestyle
Gold medal – first place	2010 Budapest	200 m freestyle
Gold medal – first place	2012 Debrecen	200 m freestyle
Gold medal – first place	2012 Debrecen	400 m freestyle
Gold medal – first place	2012 Debrecen	4×200 m freestyle
Gold medal – first place	2014 Berlin	4×200 m freestyle
Silver medal – second place	2010 Budapest	400 m freestyle
Silver medal – second place	2010 Budapest	4×200 m freestyle
Silver medal – second place	2014 Berlin	200 m freestyle
European Championships (SC)
Gold medal – first place	2008 Rijeka	400 m freestyle
Gold medal – first place	2009 Istanbul	200 m freestyle
Gold medal – first place	2009 Istanbul	400 m freestyle
Gold medal – first place	2010 Eindhoven	400 m freestyle
Gold medal – first place	2011 Szczecin	200 m freestyle
Gold medal – first place	2011 Szczecin	400 m freestyle
Gold medal – first place	2015 Netanya	200 m freestyle
Silver medal – second place	2007 Debrecen	200 m freestyle
Silver medal – second place	2007 Debrecen	400 m freestyle
Silver medal – second place	2010 Eindhoven	200 m freestyle
Silver medal – second place	2015 Netanya	400 m freestyle
Bronze medal – third place	2005 Trieste	400 m freestyle

Paul Biedermann (German pronunciation: [paʊ̯l ˈbiːdɐˌman]; born 7 August 1986) is a German retired competitive swimmer, a 200 and 400 metre freestyle long course world champion. He holds the long course world record in the 200 meters freestyle, and formerly held world records in the long course 400 meters and the short course world records in the 200 and 400 meters freestyle.

== Career ==
In 2008, Biedermann was ranked 9th in the world in the 200 m freestyle and 21st in the world in the 400 m freestyle. He won the 200 m freestyle long course at the 2008 European Aquatics Championships final, finishing in a time of 1:46.59. His times for the 400 m freestyle (3:47.69) and 200 m freestyle (NR in 1:46.37) qualified him for the Olympic Games in Beijing. At the Olympics, he placed fifth in the 200 m freestyle final (1:46.00) and 17th overall in the 400 m freestyle (3:48.03).

=== 2009 Long Course and 2010 Short Course World Championships ===
On 26 July 2009, Biedermann won the 400 m freestyle final at the 2009 World Aquatics Championships. He passed 1500 m Olympic champion Oussama Mellouli in the final 50 metres and finished with a time of 3:40.07, shaving nearly three seconds off his own personal best and bettering Ian Thorpe's 2002 world record by one-hundredth of a second. On 28 July, he claimed his second gold of the meet in the 200 m freestyle, defeating Michael Phelps in a world record time of 1:42.00 and cutting more than four seconds off of his time since the year before. Many criticise the authenticity of Biedermann's world records in the 200m and 400m freestyle, as they were swum with the now banned "super-suits," such as the LZR Racer, that were proven to give an advantage particularly over the longer distance freestyle races.

In the 2010 Short Course Worlds, Biedermann won gold in the 400 m freestyle, beating Oussama Mellouli again in a race that unfolded almost identically to their race in Rome the previous year. In the 200 m freestyle, although he was the world record holder, he only placed 5th. He was over a second behind the first-place finisher Ryan Lochte.

=== 2011 Long Course World Championships ===
Biedermann collected bronze medals in the 200 m freestyle, 400 m freestyle, and 4 × 100 m medley relay, as well as finishing 4th in the 4 × 200 m freestyle relay. He was out-touched by Michael Phelps by 0.09 seconds in the individual 200 m freestyle. However, Biedermann got the better of Phelps in the relay lead-off leg by beating him by 0.33 seconds.

=== 2012 Summer Olympics ===
At the 2012 Summer Olympics, he competed in the 200 m freestyle, finishing 5th (0.6 seconds from a medal); the 400 m freestyle; and the 4 × 200 m freestyle relay as a member of the German team that finished 4th.

=== 2016 Summer Olympics ===
At the 2016 Summer Olympics, he competed in the 200 m freestyle where he finished in 6th place. He also competed as part of the 4 × 200 m freestyle relay team which finished in 6th place. Following the games, he announced his retirement from competitive swimming.

=== Personal bests ===
==== Long course (50 m pool) ====
Event	Time	Meet	Location	Date	Notes
100 m freestyle	48.31	2014 German National Championships	Berlin, Germany	1 May 2014	
200 m freestyle	1:42.00	2009 World Championships	Rome, Italy	28 July 2009	WR
400 m freestyle	3:40.07	2009 World Championships	Rome, Italy	26 July 2009	Former WR
800 m freestyle	8:03.30	2004 German National Championships	Berlin, Germany	8 June 2004	
1500 m freestyle	15:17.46	2006 German National Championships	Berlin, Germany	25 June 2006	

Legend: WR – World record;
Records not set in finals: h – heat; sf – semifinal; r – relay 1st leg; rh – relay heat 1st leg; b – B final; † – en route to final mark; so – swim-off; tt – time trial

==== Short course (25 m pool) ====
Event	Time	Meet	Location	Date	Notes
100 m freestyle	46.63	2009 Vladimir Salnikov Cup	Saint Petersburg, Russia	19 December 2009	
200 m freestyle	1:39.37	2009 World Cup	Berlin, Germany	15 November 2009	ER, Former WR
400 m freestyle	3:32.77	2009 World Cup	Berlin, Germany	14 November 2009	NR, Former WR
800 m freestyle	7:35.23	2008 German Short Course Championships	Essen, Germany	27 November 2008	Former ER
1500 m freestyle	14:36.70	2005–06 World Cup	Berlin, Germany	22 January 2006	Former NR

Legend: WR – World record; ER – European record; NR – German record;
Records not set in finals: h – heat; sf – semifinal; r – relay 1st leg; rh – relay heat 1st leg; b – B final; † – en route to final mark; so – swim-off; tt – time trial

=== World records ===
==== Long course (50 m pool) ====
No.	Event	Time	Meet	Location	Date	Status
1	400 m freestyle	3:40.07	2009 World Championships	Rome, Italy	26 July 2009	Former
2	200 m freestyle	1:42.00	2009 World Championships	Rome, Italy	28 July 2009	Current

==== Short course (25 m pool) ====
No.	Event	Time	Meet	Location	Date	Status
1	200 m freestyle	1:40.83	2008 World Cup	Berlin, Germany	16 November 2008	Former
2	400 m freestyle	3:32.77	2009 World Cup	Berlin, Germany	14 November 2009	Former
3	200 m freestyle (2)	1:39.37	2009 World Cup	Berlin, Germany	15 November 2009	Former

=== European records ===
==== Long course (50 m pool) ====
No.	Event	Time		Meet	Location	Date	Status	Notes
1	200 m freestyle	1:44.88		2009 Mare Nostrum – Meeting International de Natation de Monte Carlo	Monte Carlo, Monaco	June 14, 2009	Former	
2	200 m freestyle (2)	1:44.71		2009 German National Championships	Berlin, Germany	June 28, 2009	Former	
3	400 m freestyle	3:43.01	h	2009 World Championships	Rome, Italy	July 26, 2009	Former	
4	400 m freestyle (2)	3:40.07		2009 World Championships	Rome, Italy	July 26, 2009	Former	Former WR
5	200 m freestyle (3)	1:43.65	sf	2009 World Championships	Rome, Italy	July 27, 2009	Former	
6	200 m freestyle (4)	1:42.00		2009 World Championships	Rome, Italy	July 28, 2009	Current	WR
7	4×200 m freestyle relay^{[a]}	7:05.62	h	2009 World Championships	Rome, Italy	July 31, 2009	Former	
8	4×100 m medley relay^{[b]}	3:29.48	h	2009 World Championships	Rome, Italy	August 2, 2009	Former	
9	4×100 m medley relay (2)^{[b]}	3:28.58		2009 World Championships	Rome, Italy	August 2, 2009	Former	

Legend: WR – World record;
Records not set in finals: h – heat; sf – semifinal; r – relay 1st leg; rh – relay heat 1st leg; b – B final; † – en route to final mark; so – swim-off; tt – time trial

a. with Felix Wolf, Yannick Lebherz and Clemens Rapp
b. with Helge Meeuw, Hendrik Feldwehr and Benjamin Starke

==== Short course (25 m pool) ====
No.	Event	Time	Meet	Location	Date	Status	Notes
1	200 m freestyle	1:40.83	2008 World Cup	Berlin, Germany	November 16, 2008	Former	Former WR
2	800 m freestyle	7:35.23	2008 German Short Course Championships	Essen, Germany	November 27, 2008	Former	
3	400 m freestyle	3:34.98	2008 German Short Course Championships	Essen, Germany	November 30, 2008	Former	
4	400 m freestyle (2)	3:32.77	2009 World Cup	Berlin, Germany	November 14, 2009	Former	Former WR
5	200 m freestyle (2)	1:39.37	2009 World Cup	Berlin, Germany	November 15, 2009	Current	Former WR

Legend: WR – World record;
Records not set in finals: h – heat; sf – semifinal; r – relay 1st leg; rh – relay heat 1st leg; b – B final; † – en route to final mark; so – swim-off; tt – time trial

== See also ==
- World record progression 200 metres freestyle
- World record progression 400 metres freestyle

Records
Preceded by Ian Thorpe	Men's 200 metre freestyle world record holder (short course); 15 November 2008 – 13 December 2024	Succeeded by Luke Hobson
Preceded by Ian Thorpe	Men's 400 metre freestyle world record holder (long course); 26 July 2009 – 12 April 2025	Succeeded by Lukas Märtens
Preceded by Michael Phelps	Men's 200 metre freestyle world record holder (long course); 28 July 2009 – present	Succeeded by Incumbent
Preceded by Grant Hackett	Men's 400 metre freestyle world record holder (short course); 24 November 2009 – 15 November 2012	Succeeded by Yannick Agnel
Awards
Preceded by Alain Bernard	European Swimmer of the Year; 2009	Succeeded by Camille Lacourt
Preceded by Matthias Steiner	German Sportsman of the Year; 2009	Succeeded by Sebastian Vettel
