= Anthony Pannier =

French swimmer (born 1988)

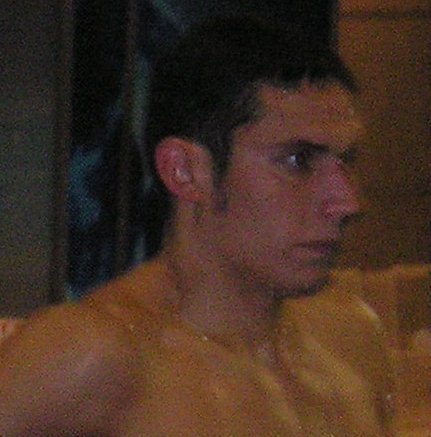
- Pannier in 2009

Personal information
- Born: 7 September 1988 (age 38) Bruges, Gironde, France
Medal record
Men's swimming
Representing France
European Championships (SC)
Bronze medal – third place	2012 Chartres	1500 m freestyle

Anthony Pannier (born 7 September 1988 in Bruges, Gironde, France) is a French swimmer. At the 2012 Summer Olympics, he competed in the Men's 1500 metre freestyle, finishing in 20th place overall in the heats, failing to qualify for the final.
