= Mads Glæsner =

Danish swimmer (born 1988)

Personal information
- Full name: Mads Glæsner
- Nationality: Denmark
- Born: 18 October 1988 (age 37) Tårnby, Denmark
- Height: 1.89 m (6 ft 2 in)
- Weight: 82 kg (181 lb)

Sport
- Sport: Swimming
- Strokes: freestyle
- Club: Vallensbæk-VAT
Medal record
Men's swimming
Representing Denmark
World Championships (SC)
Gold medal – first place	2012 Istanbul	1500 m freestyle
Silver medal – second place	2010 Dubai	1500 m freestyle
Disqualified	2012 Istanbul	400 m freestyle
European Championships (SC)
Silver medal – second place	2011 Szczecin	400 m freestyle
Silver medal – second place	2011 Szczecin	1500 m freestyle
Bronze medal – third place	2008 Rijeka	400 m freestyle
Bronze medal – third place	2009 Istanbul	400 m freestyle
Bronze medal – third place	2009 Istanbul	1500 m freestyle

Mads Glæsner (born 18 October 1988 in Tårnby) is a Danish swimmer. He participated at the 2008 Summer Olympics in the 400 metre freestyle and the 1500 metre freestyle disciplines. His swimming club is Vallensbæk-VAT but he trains at the National Training Center in Copenhagen.

He competed at the 2012 Summer Olympics in the 400 m freestyle and the 4 × 200 m freestyle relay.

In June 2013, Glæsner was stripped of a gold and bronze medal from the 2012 World Short Course Championships after testing positive for levomethamphetamine.

However, upon appeal to the Court of Arbitration for Sport, Glaesner's 1500-metre freestyle gold medal was reinstated based on the fact that a test after that race, two days after his initial positive test following the 400-metre free, was clean. He still forfeited the 400-metre freestyle bronze, which he did not appeal.

Since then, he has competed at the 2016 Summer Olympics, in the 400 m freestyle.
