= Andorra at the 2025 World Aquatics Championships =

- Flag of Andorra
- World Aquatics code: AND
- National federation: Andorran Swimming Federation
- Website: www.fan.ad

in Singapore
- Competitors: 3 in 2 sports
- Medals: Gold 0 Silver 0 Bronze 0 Total 0

World Aquatics Championships appearances
- 1973; 1975; 1978; 1982; 1986; 1991; 1994; 1998; 2001; 2003; 2005; 2007; 2009; 2011; 2013; 2015; 2017; 2019; 2022; 2023; 2024; 2025

Andorra is competing at the 2025 World Aquatics Championships in Singapore from 11 July to 3 August 2025.

== Competitors ==
The following is the list of competitors in the Championships.

| Sport | Men | Women | Total |
|---|---|---|---|
| Open water swimming | 0 | 1 | 1 |
| Swimming | 1 | 1 | 2 |
| Total | 1 | 2 | 3 |

== Open water swimming ==
Women

| Athlete | Event | Final | |
| Athlete | Event | Time | Rank |
|---|---|---|---|
| Alexandra Mejía | 5 km | 1:13:36.60 | 58 |
| Alexandra Mejía | 10 km | DNF | |

== Swimming ==
Men

| Athlete | Event | Heat | | Final | |
| Athlete | Event | Time | Rank | Time | Rank |
|---|---|---|---|---|---|
| Kevin Teixeira | 400 m freestyle | 3:59.00 | 35 | Did not advance | |
| Kevin Teixeira | 800 m freestyle | 8:25.32 | 25 | Did not advance | |

Women

| Athlete | Event | Heat | | Semifinal | | Final | |
| Athlete | Event | Time | Rank | Time | Rank | Time | Rank |
|---|---|---|---|---|---|---|---|
| Nadia Tudo | 100 m breaststroke | 1:13.28 | 49 | Did not advance | | | |
| Nadia Tudo | 200 m breaststroke | 2:36.84 | 31 | Did not advance | | | |
