= Faroe Islands at the 2025 World Aquatics Championships =

- Flag of Faroe Islands
- World Aquatics code: FRO
- National federation: Faroe Islands Aquatics Federation
- Website: ssf.fo

in Singapore
- Competitors: 4 in 1 sport
- Medals: Gold 0 Silver 0 Bronze 0 Total 0

World Aquatics Championships appearances
- 2007; 2009; 2011; 2013; 2015; 2017; 2019; 2022; 2023; 2024; 2025

Faroe Islands is competing at the 2025 World Aquatics Championships in Singapore from 11 July to 3 August 2025.

== Competitors ==
The following is the list of competitors in the Championships.

Sport	Men	Women	Total
Swimming	2	2	4
Total	2	2	4

== Swimming ==
Men

Athlete	Event	Heat		Semifinal		Final	
Athlete	Event	Time	Rank	Time	Rank	Time	Rank
Liggjas Joensen	800 m freestyle	8:21.60	24	—		Did not advance	
Liggjas Joensen	1500 m freestyle	16:22.49	20	—		Did not advance	
Isak Brisenfeldt	200 m butterfly	2:04.17	32	Did not advance			
Isak Brisenfeldt	200 m medley	2:08.44	41	Did not advance			

Women

Athlete	Event	Heat		Semifinal		Final	
Athlete	Event	Time	Rank	Time	Rank	Time	Rank
Bjarta í Lágabø	50 m backstroke	31.79	53	Did not advance			
Bjarta í Lágabø	100 m backstroke	1:09.15	54	Did not advance			
Lea Hojsted	50 m breaststroke	33.38	41	Did not advance			
Lea Hojsted	100 m breaststroke	1:13.19	48	Did not advance			

Mixed

Athlete	Event	Heat		Final	
Athlete	Event	Time	Rank	Time	Rank
Isak Brisenfeldt; Lea Hojsted; Bjarta í Lágabø; Liggjas Joensen	4 × 100 m freestyle relay	3:48.88 NR	27	Did not advance	
Isak Brisenfeldt; Lea Hojsted; Bjarta í Lágabø; Liggjas Joensen	4 × 100 m medley relay	4:12.80	29	Did not advance	
