= Swimming at the 2011 Pan American Games – Men's 1500 metre freestyle =

Men's 1500 metre freestyle at the 2011 Pan American Games
- Venue: Scotiabank Aquatics Center
- Dates: October 17 (preliminaries); October 18 (final)

Medalists
Gold medal	Arthur Frayler	United States
Silver medal	Joseph Feely	United States
Bronze medal	Juan Pereyra	Argentina

The men's 1500 metre freestyle competition of the swimming events at the 2011 Pan American Games took place on October 17 and 18 at the Scotiabank Aquatics Center in the municipality of Zapopan, near Guadalajara, Mexico. The defending Pan American Games champion was Chip Peterson of the United States.

This race consisted of thirty lengths of the pool, all lengths being in freestyle.

== Records ==
Prior to this competition, the existing world and Pan American Games records were as follows:

World record	Sun Yang (CHN)	14:34.14	Shanghai, China	July 31, 2011
Pan American Games record	Chip Peterson (USA)	15:12.33	Rio de Janeiro, Brazil	July 18, 2007

== Qualification ==
Each National Olympic Committee (NOC) was able to enter up to two entrants providing they had met the A standard (15:50.4) in the qualifying period (January 1, 2010 to September 4, 2011). NOCs were also permitted to enter one athlete providing they had met the B standard (16:18.9) in the same qualifying period.

== Results ==
All times are in minutes and seconds.

KEY:	q	Fastest non-qualifiers	Q	Qualified	NR	National record	PB	Personal best	SB	Seasonal best

=== Heats ===
The first round was held on October 17.

Rank	Heat	Lane	Name	Nationality	Time	Notes
1	2	4	Ryan Feeley	United States	15:32.86	Q
2	1	4	Arthur Frayler	United States	15:34.34	Q
3	2	6	Arturo Perez Vertti	Mexico	15:36.74	Q
4	1	5	Lucas Kanieski	Brazil	15:39.79	Q
5	2	3	Juan Martin Pereyra	Argentina	15:40.44	Q
6	1	3	Alejandro Gómez	Venezuela	15:40.75	Q
7	1	6	Martin Naidich	Argentina	15:49.51	Q
8	1	7	Ricardo Monasterio	Venezuela	15:50.65	Q
9	2	2	Daniel Delgadillo	Mexico	15:54.15	
10	2	7	Esteban Enderica	Ecuador	16:07.78	
11	1	2	Mateo de Angulo	Colombia	16:10.45	
12	2	1	Sebastian Jahnsen	Peru	16:16.90	
13	2	5	Luiz Arapiraca	Brazil	16:28.19	

=== Final ===
The final was held on October 18.

Rank	Lane	Name	Nationality	Time	Notes
1st place, gold medalist(s)	5	Arthur Frayler	United States	15:19.59	
2nd place, silver medalist(s)	4	Joseph Feely	United States	15:22.19	
3rd place, bronze medalist(s)	2	Juan Pereyra	Argentina	15:26.20	
4	3	Arturo Perez Vertti	Mexico	15:30.94	
5	6	Lucas Kanieski	Brazil	15:31.23	
6	7	Alejandro Gómez	Venezuela	15:44.03	
7	1	Martin Naidich	Argentina	15:46.98	
8	8	Ricardo Monasterio	Venezuela	16:05.64	
