= Swimming at the 2015 Pan American Games – Men's 1500 metre freestyle =

Men's 1500 metre freestyle at the 2015 Pan American Games
- Venue: CIBC Pan Am/Parapan Am Aquatics Centre and Field House
- Dates: July 18 (preliminaries and finals)
- Competitors: 17 from 12 nations
- Winning time: 15:06.40

Medalists
Gold medal	Ryan Cochrane	Canada
Silver medal	Andrew Gemmell	United States
Bronze medal	Brandonn Almeida	Brazil

The men's 1500 metre freestyle competition of the swimming events at the 2015 Pan American Games took place on July 18 at the CIBC Pan Am/Parapan Am Aquatics Centre and Field House in Toronto, Canada. The defending Pan American Games champion was Arthur Frayler of the United States.

This race consisted of thirty lengths of the pool in freestyle. All participating swimmers would take part in 3 heats based on qualifying time. There were no finals.

== Records ==
Prior to this competition, the existing world and Pan American Games records were as follows:

World record	Sun Yang (CHN)	14:31.02	London, Great Britain	August 4, 2012
Pan American Games record	Chip Peterson (USA)	15:12.33	Rio de Janeiro, Brazil	July 21, 2007

The following new records were set during this competition.

Date	Event	Name	Nationality	Time	Record
18 July	Final	Ryan Cochrane	Canada	15:06.40	GR

== Qualification ==
Each National Olympic Committee (NOC) was able to enter up to two entrants providing they had met the A standard (15:48.39) in the qualifying period (January 1, 2014 to May 1, 2015). NOCs were also permitted to enter one athlete providing they had met the B standard (16:45.29) in the same qualifying period. All other competing athletes were entered as universality spots.

== Schedule ==
All times are Eastern Time Zone (UTC-4).

Date	Time	Round
July 18, 2015	10:39	Finals 1–2
July 18, 2015	20:08	Final 3

== Results ==
KEY:	q	Fastest non-qualifiers	Q	Qualified	GR	Games record	NR	National record	PB	Personal best	SB	Seasonal best

=== Final ===
The finals were held on July 18.

Rank	Heat	Lane	Name	Nationality	Time	Notes
1st place, gold medalist(s)	3	4	Ryan Cochrane	Canada	15:06.40	GR
2nd place, silver medalist(s)	3	5	Andrew Gemmell	United States	15:09.92	
3rd place, bronze medalist(s)	3	3	Brandonn Almeida	Brazil	15:11.70	NR
4	3	1	Marcelo Acosta	El Salvador	15:16.26	
5	3	6	Nelson Maitland	Canada	15:16.35	
6	3	2	Ryan Feeley	United States	15:19.99	
7	3	7	Lucas Kanieski	Brazil	15:23.91	
8	3	8	Mateo de Angulo	Colombia	15:24.27	
9	2	6	Ricardo Vargas	Mexico	15:27.23	
10	2	4	Alejandro Gomez	Venezuela	15:27.30	
11	2	2	Arturo Perez Vertti	Mexico	15:42.39	
12	1	3	Tomas Peribonio	Ecuador	15:43.36	
13	2	5	Martin Naidich	Argentina	15:46.99	
14	2	7	Christian Bayo	Puerto Rico	15:49.47	
15	2	3	Andy Arteta	Venezuela	15:56.57	
16	1	4	Felipe Tapia	Chile	16:08.48	
17	1	5	Gustavo Gutiérrez	Peru	16:08.75	
	2	1	Yeziel Morales	Puerto Rico		DNS
