= Swimming at the 2015 World Aquatics Championships – Men's 800 metre freestyle =

Men's 800 metre freestyle at the 2015 World Aquatics Championships
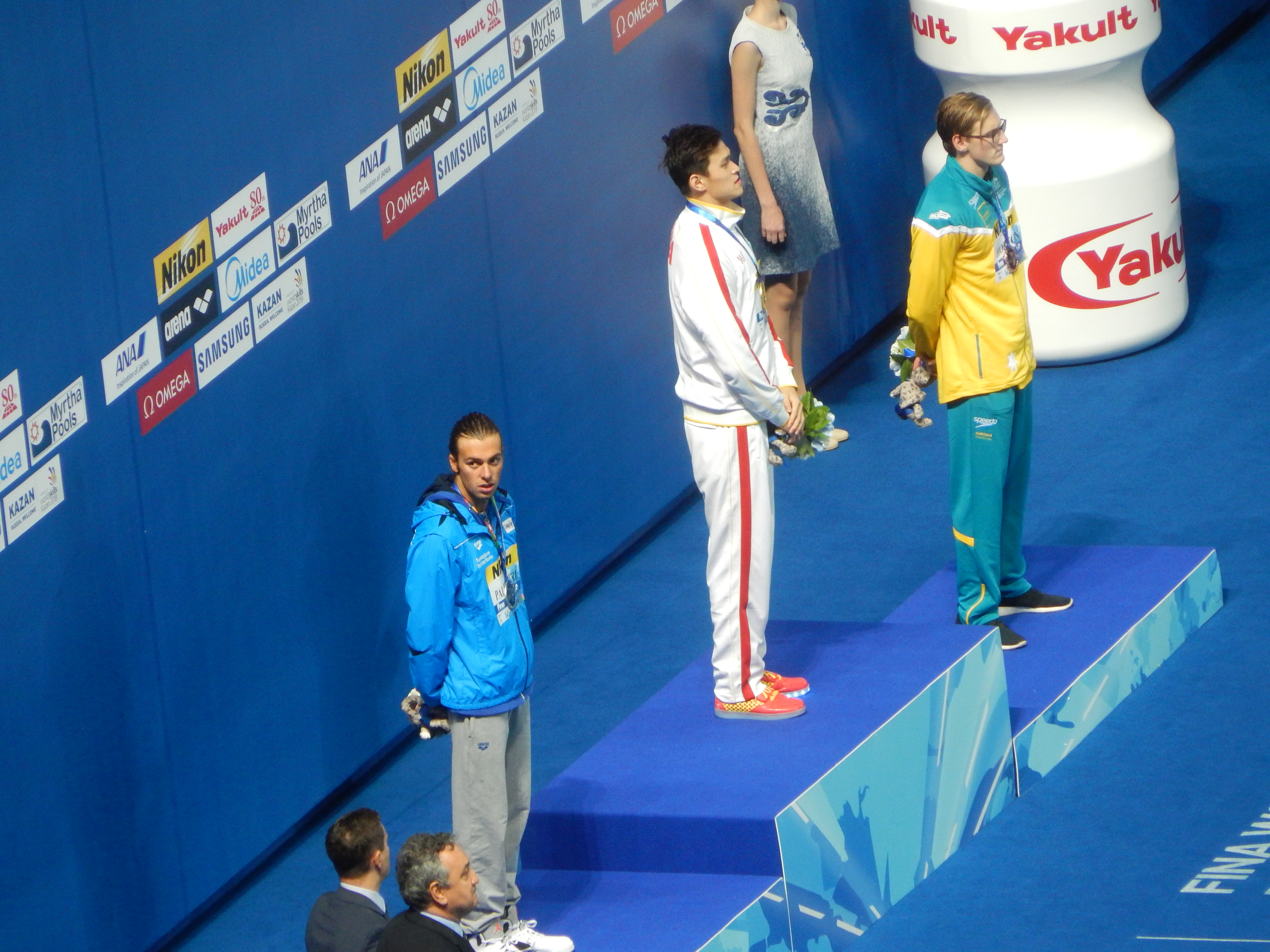
- Victory Ceremony
- Dates: 4 August (heats); 5 August (final)
- Competitors: 41 from 36 nations
- Winning time: 7:39.96

Medalists
gold medal	Sun Yang	China
silver medal	Gregorio Paltrinieri	Italy
bronze medal	Mack Horton	Australia

The men's 800 metre freestyle competition of the swimming events at the 2015 World Aquatics Championships was held on 4 August with the heats and 5 August with the final.

== Records ==
Prior to the competition, the existing world and championship records were as follows.

World record	Zhang Lin (CHN)	7:32.12	Rome, Italy	29 July 2009
Competition record	Zhang Lin (CHN)	7:32.12	Rome, Italy	29 July 2009

== Results ==
=== Heats ===
The heats were held at 10:30.

Rank	Heat	Lane	Name	Nationality	Time	Notes
1	5	3	Connor Jaeger	United States	7:44.77	Q
2	5	4	Gregorio Paltrinieri	Italy	7:45.15	Q
3	5	2	Stephen Milne	Great Britain	7:46.61	Q
4	5	6	Michael McBroom	United States	7:47.05	Q
5	5	5	Mack Horton	Australia	7:47.08	Q
6	4	5	Sun Yang	China	7:47.87	Q
7	5	8	Wojciech Wojdak	Poland	7:48.95	Q
8	3	6	Henrik Christiansen	Norway	7:49.70	Q, NR
9	5	1	Ahmed Akram	Egypt	7:49.83	NR
10	4	4	Ryan Cochrane	Canada	7:50.28	
11	4	2	Damien Joly	France	7:50.30	
12	4	0	Marc Sánchez	Spain	7:51.19	
13	3	0	Mads Glæsner	Denmark	7:51.24	NR
14	3	5	Joris Bouchaut	France	7:52.37	
15	4	1	Florian Vogel	Germany	7:53.61	
16	4	9	Maarten Brzoskowski	Netherlands	7:54.31	
17	4	3	Pál Joensen	Faroe Islands	7:55.01	
18	3	4	Richárd Nagy	Slovakia	7:55.31	NR
19	5	9	Wang Kecheng	China	7:56.05	
20	3	7	Nathan Capp	New Zealand	7:57.61	NR
21	3	8	Martín Naidich	Argentina	7:57.72	
22	4	8	Sören Meißner	Germany	7:57.93	
23	5	7	Gergely Gyurta	Hungary	7:58.70	
24	4	6	Péter Bernek	Hungary	7:59.56	
25	3	1	Serhiy Frolov	Ukraine	8:02.17	
26	3	2	Esteban Enderica	Ecuador	8:03.17	
27	3	9	Martin Bau	Slovenia	8:04.11	
28	5	0	Myles Brown	South Africa	8:04.47	
29	2	5	Vuk Čelić	Serbia	8:05.68	
30	4	7	Jan Micka	Czech Republic	8:05.76	
31	3	3	Matias Koski	Finland	8:07.28	
32	2	6	Sven Arnar Saemundsson	Croatia	8:07.40	NR
33	2	1	Ido Haber	Israel	8:07.78	
34	2	2	Alexei Sancov	Moldova	8:10.83	
35	2	3	Marcelo Acosta	El Salvador	8:12.52	
36	2	4	Ernest Maksumov	Russia	8:12.65	
37	1	4	Alin Artimon	Romania	8:17.16	
38	2	8	Sim Wee Sheng Welson Sim	Malaysia	8:18.20	
39	2	7	Andy Arteta	Venezuela	8:19.39	
40	1	5	Felipe Tapia	Chile	8:21.27	
41	1	3	Pol Arias	Andorra	8:28.11	

=== Final ===
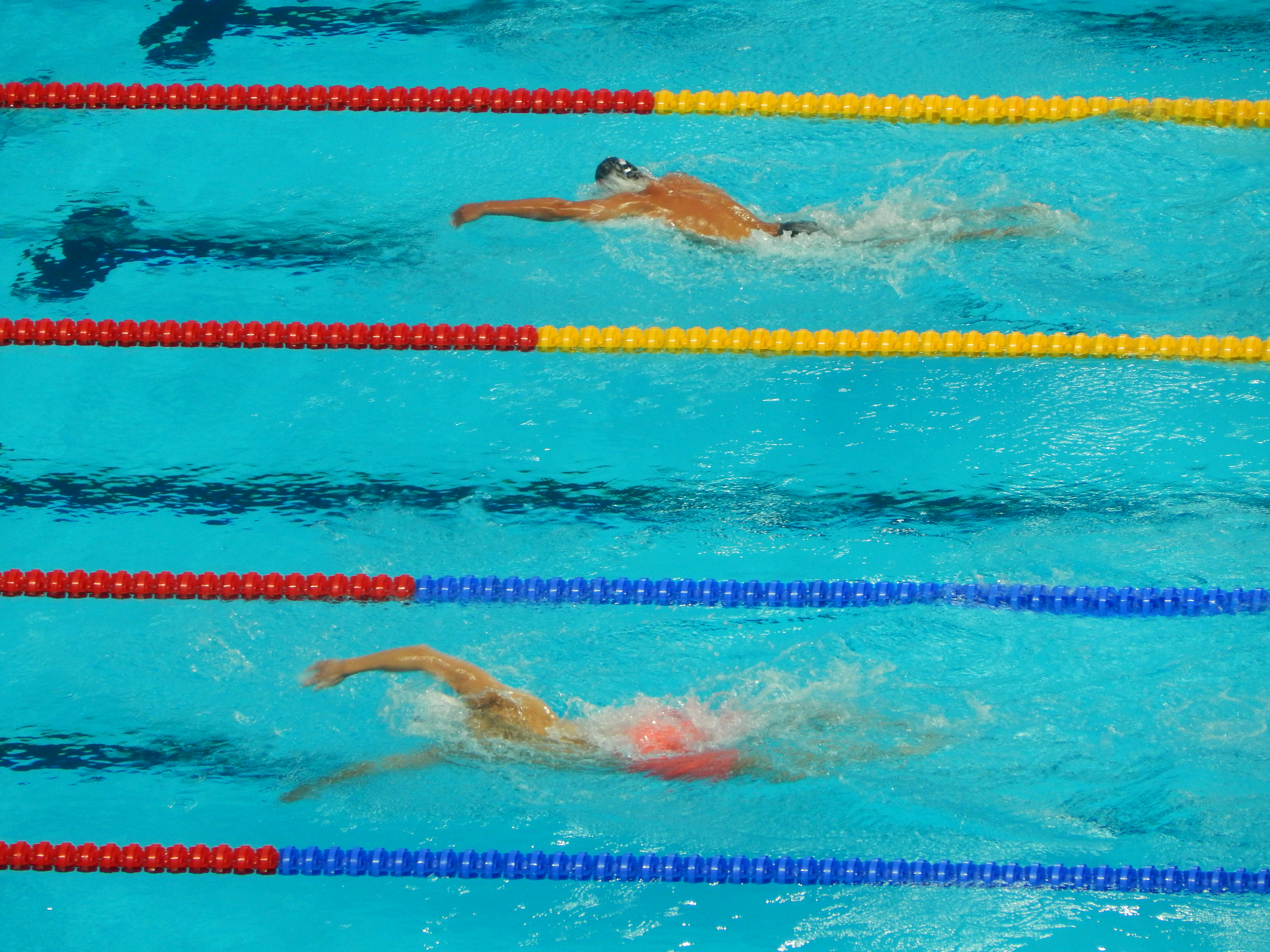
Sun and Paltrinieri swim to medals

The final was held at 18:58.

Rank	Lane	Name	Nationality	Time	Notes
1st place, gold medalist(s)	7	Sun Yang	China	7:39.96	
2nd place, silver medalist(s)	5	Gregorio Paltrinieri	Italy	7:40.81	ER
3rd place, bronze medalist(s)	2	Mack Horton	Australia	7:44.02	
4	4	Connor Jaeger	United States	7:44.51	
5	8	Henrik Christiansen	Norway	7:45.66	NR
6	1	Wojciech Wojdak	Poland	7:45.90	NR
7	3	Stephen Milne	Great Britain	7:49.86	
8	6	Michael McBroom	United States	7:55.30	
