= Andorra at the 2015 World Aquatics Championships =

- Flag of Andorra
- World Aquatics code: AND
- National federation: Federació Andorrana de Natació
- Website: www.fan.ad

in Kazan, Russia
- Competitors: 3 in 1 sport
- Medals: Gold 0 Silver 0 Bronze 0 Total 0

World Aquatics Championships appearances
- 1973; 1975; 1978; 1982; 1986; 1991; 1994; 1998; 2001; 2003; 2005; 2007; 2009; 2011; 2013; 2015; 2017; 2019; 2022; 2023; 2024; 2025

Andorra competed at the 2015 World Aquatics Championships in Kazan, Russia from 24 July to 9 August 2015.

== Swimming ==
Andorran swimmers have achieved qualifying standards in the following events (up to a maximum of 2 swimmers in each event at the A-standard entry time, and 1 at the B-standard):

Men

Athlete	Event	Heat		Final	
Athlete	Event	Time	Rank	Time	Rank
Pol Arias	800 m freestyle	8:28.11	41	did not advance	
Pol Arias	1500 m freestyle	16:26.35	45	did not advance	

Women

Athlete	Event	Heat		Semifinal		Final	
Athlete	Event	Time	Rank	Time	Rank	Time	Rank
Mónica Ramírez	100 m freestyle	58.85	61	did not advance			
Mónica Ramírez	50 m backstroke	30.89	41	did not advance			
Nàdia Tudó	50 m freestyle	28.00	71	did not advance			
Nàdia Tudó	200 m freestyle	2:12.21	57	did not advance			
