= Swimming at the 2015 World Aquatics Championships – Men's 1500 metre freestyle =

Men's 1500 metre freestyle at the 2015 World Aquatics Championships
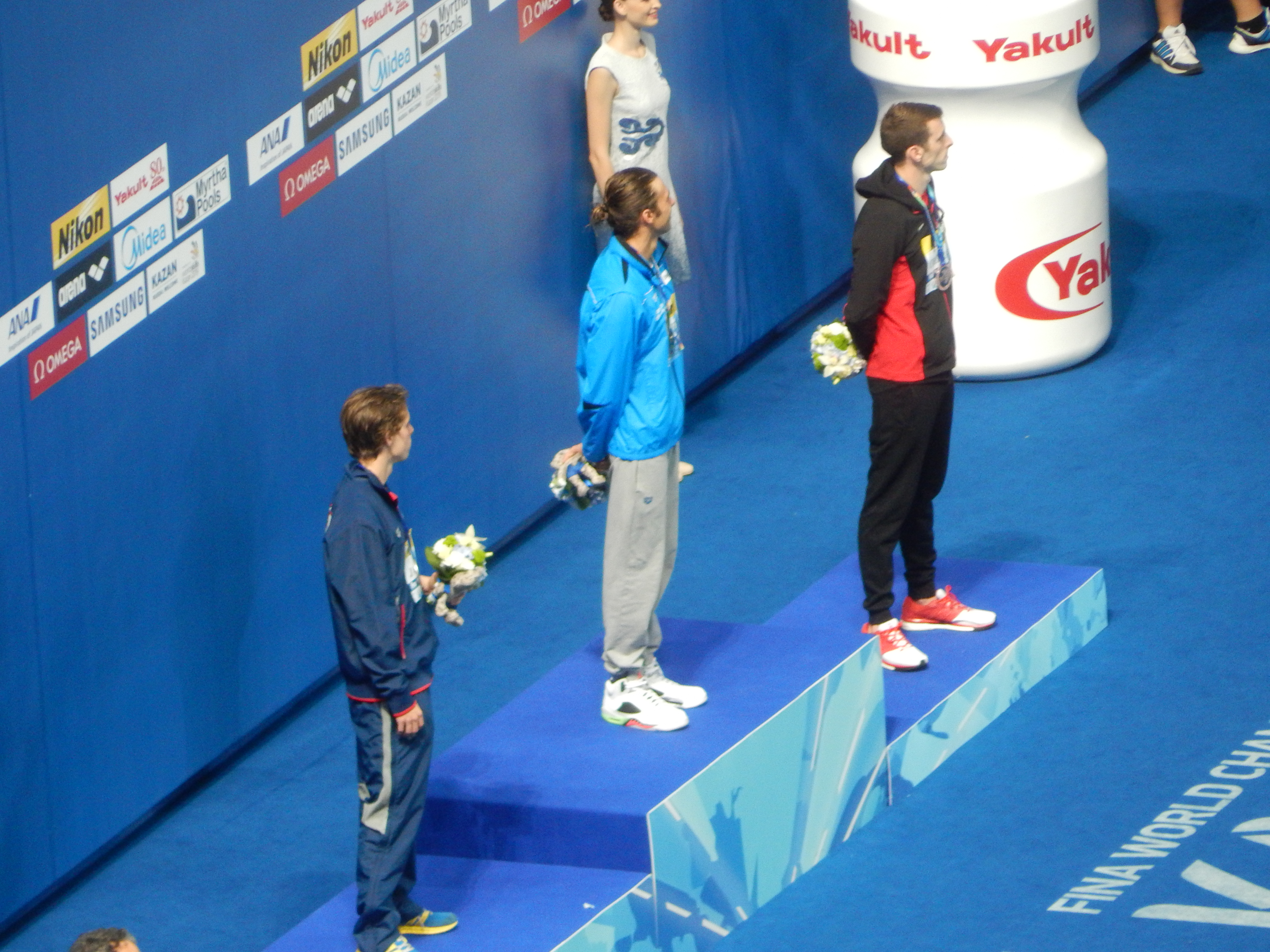
- Victory Ceremony
- Dates: 8 August (heats); 9 August (final)
- Competitors: 45 from 40 nations
- Winning time: 14:39.67

Medalists
| gold medal | Gregorio Paltrinieri | Italy |
| silver medal | Connor Jaeger | United States |
| bronze medal | Ryan Cochrane | Canada |

The Men's 1500 metre freestyle competition of the swimming events at the 2015 World Aquatics Championships was held on 8 August with the heats and 9 August with the final.

== Records ==
Prior to the competition, the existing world and championship records were as follows.

| World record | Sun Yang (CHN) | 14:31.02 | London, Great Britain | 4 August 2012 |
| Competition record | Sun Yang (CHN) | 14:34.14 | Shanghai, China | 31 July 2011 |

== Results ==
=== Heats ===
The heats were held at 10:48.

| Rank | Heat | Lane | Name | Nationality | Time | Notes |
|---|---|---|---|---|---|---|
| 1 | 5 | 4 | Gregorio Paltrinieri | Italy | 14:51.04 | Q |
| 2 | 5 | 3 | Connor Jaeger | United States | 14:53.34 | Q |
| 3 | 5 | 5 | Sun Yang | China | 14:55.11 | Q |
| 4 | 5 | 6 | Stephen Milne | Great Britain | 14:55.17 | Q |
| 5 | 5 | 0 | Ahmed Akram | Egypt | 14:55.42 | Q, NR |
| 6 | 4 | 3 | Ryan Cochrane | Canada | 14:55.96 | Q |
| 7 | 4 | 6 | Michael McBroom | United States | 14:57.07 | Q |
| 8 | 4 | 2 | Mykhailo Romanchuk | Ukraine | 14:57.82 | Q, NR |
| 9 | 4 | 5 | Pál Joensen | Faroe Islands | 14:58.52 | |
| 10 | 5 | 7 | Damien Joly | France | 14:58.79 | |
| 11 | 4 | 4 | Mack Horton | Australia | 15:00.51 | |
| 12 | 4 | 9 | Henrik Christiansen | Norway | 15:02.37 | NR |
| 13 | 4 | 0 | Richárd Nagy | Slovakia | 15:04.03 | NR |
| 14 | 4 | 8 | Ruwen Straub | Germany | 15:04.80 | |
| 15 | 3 | 6 | Maarten Brzoskowski | Netherlands | 15:10.91 | |
| 16 | 3 | 5 | Marc Sánchez | Spain | 15:12.79 | |
| 17 | 4 | 1 | Wojciech Wojdak | Poland | 15:14.28 | |
| 18 | 2 | 2 | Martín Naidich | Argentina | 15:14.38 | |
| 19 | 3 | 2 | Wang Kecheng | China | 15:16.69 | |
| 20 | 5 | 2 | Gergely Gyurta | Hungary | 15:16.84 | |
| 21 | 3 | 7 | Nathan Capp | New Zealand | 15:17.77 | |
| 22 | 3 | 8 | Esteban Enderica | Ecuador | 15:20.58 | NR |
| 23 | 4 | 7 | Jan Micka | Czech Republic | 15:22.16 | |
| 24 | 2 | 7 | Martin Bau | Slovenia | 15:22.80 | |
| 25 | 3 | 1 | Marcelo Acosta | El Salvador | 15:25.14 | |
| 26 | 1 | 7 | Mihajlo Čeprkalo | Bosnia and Herzegovina | 15:26.22 | |
| 27 | 2 | 4 | Ernest Maksumov | Russia | 15:26.64 | |
| 28 | 5 | 9 | Serhiy Frolov | Ukraine | 15:29.52 | |
| 29 | 5 | 1 | Sören Meißner | Germany | 15:30.02 | |
| 30 | 3 | 4 | Ferry Weertman | Netherlands | 15:32.01 | |
| 31 | 3 | 9 | Nezir Karap | Turkey | 15:32.60 | |
| 32 | 2 | 3 | Alejandro Gómez | Venezuela | 15:32.75 | |
| 33 | 3 | 0 | Vuk Čelić | Serbia | 15:33.71 | |
| 34 | 2 | 9 | Cho Cheng-chi | Chinese Taipei | 15:37.25 | |
| 35 | 1 | 3 | Sajan Prakash | India | 15:45.29 | |
| 36 | 1 | 2 | Felipe Tapia | Chile | 15:45.63 | |
| 37 | 5 | 8 | Felix Auböck | Austria | 15:45.69 | |
| 38 | 2 | 1 | Christian Punter | Puerto Rico | 15:46.19 | |
| 39 | 2 | 0 | Sven Arnar Saemundsson | Croatia | 15:53.43 | |
| 40 | 2 | 8 | Alexei Sancov | Moldova | 15:53.85 | |
| 41 | 2 | 6 | Lâm Quang Nhật | Vietnam | 15:54.56 | |
| 42 | 1 | 6 | Luis Ventura | Mexico | 15:55.92 | |
| 43 | 1 | 4 | Welson Sim | Malaysia | 16:09.72 | |
| 44 | 1 | 8 | Geoffrey Butler | Cayman Islands | 16:21.18 | |
| 45 | 1 | 1 | Pol Arias | Andorra | 16:26.35 | |
| | 1 | 5 | Matias Koski | Finland | | DNS |
| | 2 | 5 | Mateo de Angulo | Colombia | | DNS |
| | 3 | 3 | Péter Bernek | Hungary | | DNS |

=== Final ===
The final was held on 9 August at 18:20.

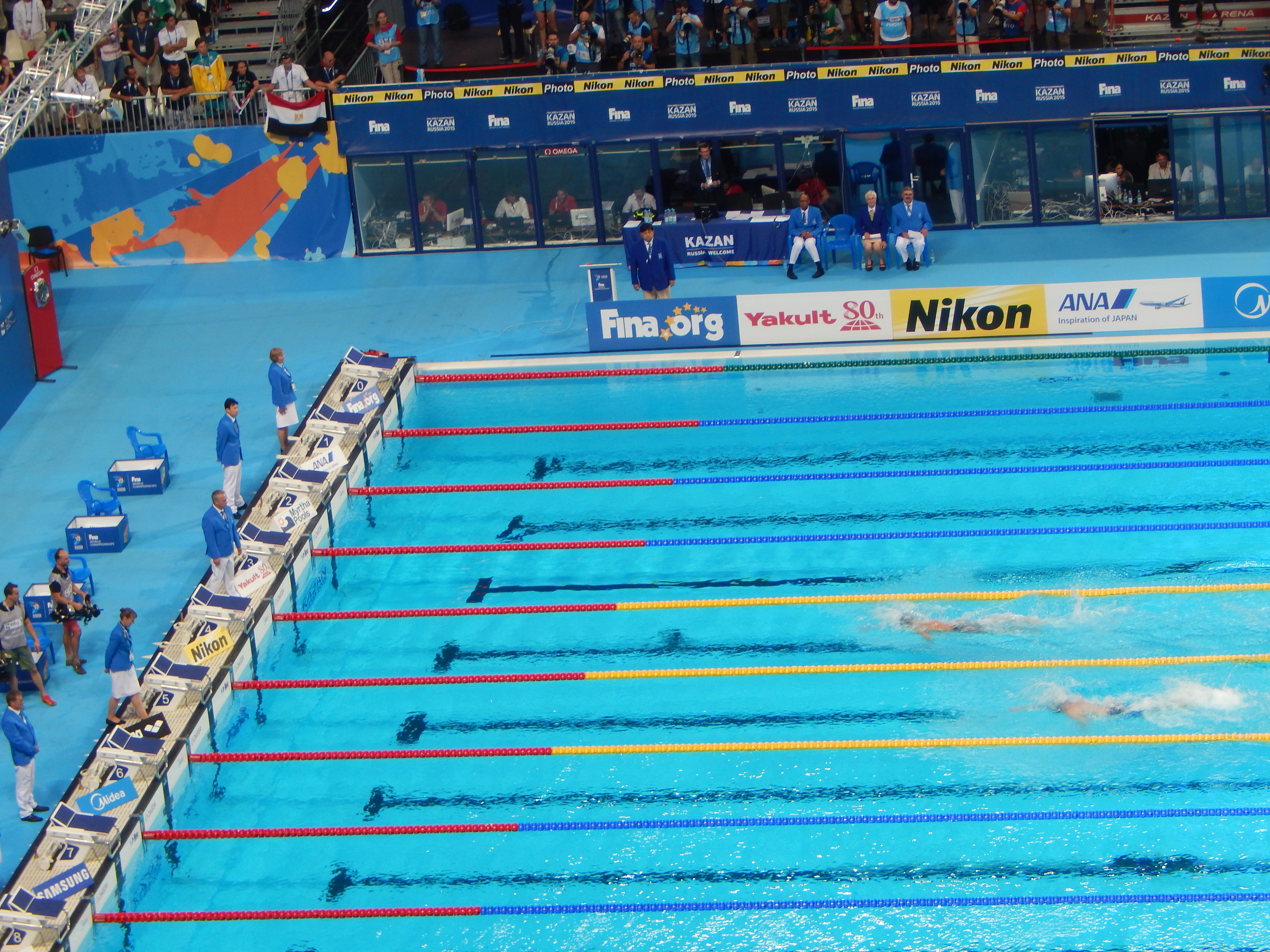
Last lap of final

| Rank | Lane | Name | Nationality | Time | Notes |
|---|---|---|---|---|---|
| 1st place, gold medalist(s) | 4 | Gregorio Paltrinieri | Italy | 14:39.67 | ER |
| 2nd place, silver medalist(s) | 5 | Connor Jaeger | United States | 14:41.20 | NR |
| 3rd place, bronze medalist(s) | 7 | Ryan Cochrane | Canada | 14:51.08 | |
| 4 | 2 | Ahmed Akram | Egypt | 14:53.66 | NR |
| 5 | 6 | Stephen Milne | Great Britain | 14:58.62 | |
| 6 | 1 | Michael McBroom | United States | 15:06.81 | |
| 7 | 8 | Mykhailo Romanchuk | Ukraine | 15:09.77 | |
| | 3 | Sun Yang | China | | DNS |

- Sun Yang did not swim the final, and he did not tell anyone that he had no intention of swimming. The next man on the list who would have taken his place in the final, was Pál Joensen from the Faroe Islands, but he did not get any message that he could swim in the final, and therefore lane 3 was empty during the final. Sun Yang said after the event that he had felt chest pain after winning the 800 m freestyle. He felt it again shortly before the final of 1500 m free, but he could not say at what time it was.
