= Swimming at the 2014 South American Games – Men's 1500 metre freestyle =

Men's 1500 metre freestyle at the 2014 South American Games
- Venue: Estadio Nacional
- Dates: March 9, 2014 (heats & finals)
- Competitors: 10 from 7 nations
- Winning time: 15:27.92

Medalists
gold medal	Esteban Enderica	Ecuador
silver medal	Andy Arteta Gomez	Venezuela
bronze medal	Alejandro Gómez	Venezuela

The men's 1500 metre freestyle competition at the 2014 South American Games took place on March 9 at the Estadio Nacional. The last champion was Luiz Arapiraca of Brazil.

This event was a timed-final where each swimmer swam just once. The top 8 seeded swimmers swam in the evening, and the remaining swimmers swam in the morning session.

== Records ==
Prior to this competition, the existing world and Pan Pacific records were as follows:

World record	Sun Yang (CHN)	14:31.02	London, Great Britain	August 4, 2012
South American Games record	Luiz Lima (BRA)	15:38.98	Buenos Aires, Argentina	November 17, 2006

== Results ==
All times are in minutes and seconds.

KEY:	q	Fastest non-qualifiers	Q	Qualified	CR	Championships record	NR	National record	PB	Personal best	SB	Seasonal best

The first round was held on March 9, at 11:06, and the final was held on March 9, at 18:05.

Rank	Heat	Lane	Name	Nationality	Time	Notes
1st place, gold medalist(s)	2	5	Esteban Enderica	Ecuador	15:27.92	CR
2nd place, silver medalist(s)	2	3	Andy Arteta Gomez	Venezuela	15:30.80	
3rd place, bronze medalist(s)	2	1	Alejandro Gómez	Venezuela	15:35.58	
4	2	4	Martín Naidich	Argentina	15:40.42	
5	2	7	Mateo de Angulo	Colombia	15:46.28	
6	2	6	Lucas Kanieski	Brazil	15:47.42	
7	2	8	Martín Carrizo Yunges	Argentina	16:01.58	
8	1	4	Miguel Tapia Salinas	Chile	16:09.93	
9	2	2	Jesus Monge Osorio	Peru	16:18.75	
10	1	5	Alonso Perez Salinas	Chile	16:52.64	
