= Swimming at the 2013 World Aquatics Championships – Men's 800 metre freestyle =

Men's 800 metre freestyle at the 2013 World Aquatics Championships
- Venue: Palau Sant Jordi
- Dates: July 30, 2013 (heats); July 31, 2013 (final)
- Competitors: 34 from 30 nations
- Winning time: 7:41.36

Medalists
| gold medal | Sun Yang | China |
| silver medal | Michael McBroom | United States |
| bronze medal | Ryan Cochrane | Canada |

Barcelona Palau San Jordi

The men's 800 metre freestyle event in swimming at the 2013 World Aquatics Championships took place on 30–31 July at the Palau Sant Jordi in Barcelona, Spain.

== Records ==
Prior to this competition, the existing world and championship records were:

| World record | Zhang Lin (CHN) | 7:32.12 | Rome, Italy | 29 July 2009 |
| Competition record | Zhang Lin (CHN) | 7:32.12 | Rome, Italy | 29 July 2009 |

== Results ==
=== Heats ===
The heats were held at 10:54.

| Rank | Heat | Lane | Name | Nationality | Time | Notes |
|---|---|---|---|---|---|---|
| 1 | 2 | 4 | Connor Jaeger | United States | 7:49.28 | Q |
| 2 | 3 | 4 | Sun Yang | China | 7:49.37 | Q |
| 3 | 4 | 4 | Ryan Cochrane | Canada | 7:49.58 | Q |
| 4 | 4 | 5 | Michael McBroom | United States | 7:50.62 | Q |
| 5 | 3 | 3 | Oussama Mellouli | Tunisia | 7:50.77 | Q |
| 6 | 2 | 8 | Pál Joensen | Faroe Islands | 7:50.81 | Q |
| 7 | 3 | 5 | Gregorio Paltrinieri | Italy | 7:52.33 | Q |
| 8 | 4 | 6 | Jordan Harrison | Australia | 7:52.55 | Q |
| 9 | 3 | 8 | Matias Koski | Finland | 7:54.70 | NR |
| 10 | 3 | 2 | Filip Zaborowski | Poland | 7:55.65 | |
| 11 | 2 | 5 | Gabriele Detti | Italy | 7:56.15 | |
| 12 | 4 | 3 | Daniel Fogg | Great Britain | 7:56.62 | |
| 13 | 4 | 2 | Sören Meissner | Germany | 7:56.64 | |
| 14 | 3 | 6 | Ayatsugu Hirai | Japan | 7:56.69 | |
| 15 | 3 | 1 | Marc Sánchez | Spain | 7:57.64 | |
| 16 | 4 | 7 | Devon Myles Brown | South Africa | 7:57.69 | |
| 17 | 4 | 1 | Damien Joly | France | 7:57.79 | |
| 18 | 2 | 3 | Serhiy Frolov | Ukraine | 7:58.70 | |
| 19 | 4 | 0 | Richárd Nagy | Slovakia | 7:59.69 | |
| 20 | 3 | 7 | Martin Grodzki | Germany | 8:00.36 | |
| 21 | 2 | 7 | Pawel Furtek | Poland | 8:00.56 | |
| 22 | 2 | 6 | Gergő Kis | Hungary | 8:00.92 | |
| 23 | 2 | 1 | David Brandl | Austria | 8:05.45 | |
| 24 | 3 | 9 | Uladzimir Zhyharau | Belarus | 8:05.51 | |
| 25 | 2 | 0 | Anton Sveinn McKee | Iceland | 8:08.71 | |
| 26 | 4 | 8 | Ahmed Akaram | Egypt | 8:08.73 | |
| 27 | 4 | 9 | Alejandro Gómez | Venezuela | 8:09.04 | |
| 28 | 3 | 0 | Arturo Pérez Vertti | Mexico | 8:09.23 | |
| 29 | 1 | 5 | Marcelo Acosta | El Salvador | 8:17.39 | |
| 30 | 1 | 4 | Jang Sang-Jin | South Korea | 8:18.51 | |
| 31 | 2 | 2 | Martin Naidich | Argentina | 8:20.53 | |
| 32 | 2 | 9 | Nezir Karap | Turkey | 8:21.31 | |
| 33 | 1 | 3 | Khader Baqleh | Jordan | 8:43.13 | |
| 34 | 1 | 6 | Brandon Schuster | Samoa | 9:27.45 | |

=== Final ===
The final was held at 19:29.

| Rank | Lane | Name | Nationality | Time | Notes |
|---|---|---|---|---|---|
| 1st place, gold medalist(s) | 5 | Sun Yang | China | 7:41.36 | |
| 2nd place, silver medalist(s) | 6 | Michael McBroom | United States | 7:43.60 | NR |
| 3rd place, bronze medalist(s) | 3 | Ryan Cochrane | Canada | 7:43.70 | |
| 4 | 4 | Connor Jaeger | United States | 7:44.26 | |
| 5 | 8 | Jordan Harrison | Australia | 7:47.38 | |
| 6 | 1 | Gregorio Paltrinieri | Italy | 7:50.29 | |
| 7 | 7 | Pál Joensen | Faroe Islands | 7:52.57 | |
| 8 | 2 | Oussama Mellouli | Tunisia | 7:52.79 | |
