= Swimming at the 2014 South American Games – Men's 800 metre freestyle =

Men's 800 metre freestyle at the 2014 South American Games
- Venue: Estadio Nacional
- Dates: March 7, 2014 (heats & finals)
- Competitors: 11 from 7 nations
- Winning time: 8:05.28

Medalists
gold medal	Martín Naidich	Argentina
silver medal	Esteban Enderica	Ecuador
bronze medal	Marcos Ferrari	Brazil

The men's 800 metre freestyle competition at the 2014 South American Games took place on March 7 at the Estadio Nacional. The last champion was Lucas Kanieski of Brazil.

This event was a timed-final where each swimmer swam just once. The top 8 seeded swimmers swam in the evening, and the remaining swimmers swam in the morning session.

== Records ==
Prior to this competition, the existing world and Pan Pacific records were as follows:

World record	Zhang Lin (CHN)	7:32.12	Rome, Italy	July 29, 2009
South American Games record	Lucas Kanieski (BRA)	8:09.81	Medellín, Colombia	March 26, 2010

== Results ==
All times are in minutes and seconds.

KEY:	q	Fastest non-qualifiers	Q	Qualified	CR	Championships record	NR	National record	PB	Personal best	SB	Seasonal best

The first round was held on March 7, at 11:30, and the final was held on March 7, at 19:00.

Rank	Heat	Lane	Name	Nationality	Time	Notes
1st place, gold medalist(s)	2	4	Martín Naidich	Argentina	8:05.28	CR
2nd place, silver medalist(s)	2	8	Esteban Enderica	Ecuador	8:07.78	
3rd place, bronze medalist(s)	2	5	Marcos Ferrari	Brazil	8:09.93	
4	2	3	Lucas Kanieski	Brazil	8:11.62	
5	2	1	Alejandro Gómez	Venezuela	8:12.13	
6	2	2	Mateo de Angulo	Colombia	8:16.36	
7	2	6	Juan Pereyra	Argentina	8:16.56	
8	2	7	Andy Arteta Gomez	Venezuela	8:16.74	
9	1	4	Jesus Monge Osorio	Peru	8:28.79	
10	1	5	Miguel Tapia Salinas	Chile	8:29.47	
11	1	3	Alonso Perez Salinas	Chile	8:54.25	
