= Swimming at the 2015 Pan American Games – Men's marathon 10 kilometres =

Men's marathon 10 kilometres at the 2015 Pan American Games
- Venue: Ontario Place West Channel
- Dates: July 12
- Competitors: 18 from 10 nations
- Winning time: 1:54:03.6

Medalists
| Gold medal | Chip Peterson | United States |
| Silver medal | David Heron | United States |
| Bronze medal | Esteban Enderica | Ecuador |

The men's marathon 10 kilometres competition of the swimming events at the 2015 Pan American Games took place on July 12 at the Ontario Place West Channel, where athletes completed six 1.67 km laps. The defending Pan American Games champion was Richard Weinberger of Canada.

== Schedule ==
All times are Eastern Daylight Time (UTC-4).

| Date | Time | Round |
|---|---|---|
| July 12, 2015 | 15:30 | Final |

== Results ==
| Rank | Swimmer | Time |
|---|---|---|
| 1st place, gold medalist(s) | Chip Peterson (USA) | 1:54:03.6 |
| 2nd place, silver medalist(s) | David Heron (USA) | 1:54:07.4 |
| 3rd place, bronze medalist(s) | Esteban Enderica (ECU) | 1:54:09.2 |
| 4 | Richard Weinberger (CAN) | 1:54:09.3 |
| 5 | Luiz Arapiraca (BRA) | 1:55:12.7 |
| 6 | Wilder Carreño Mendoza (VEN) | 1:56:05.2 |
| 7 | Diego Vera Delgado (VEN) | 1:56:26.3 |
| 8 | Guillermo Bertola (ARG) | 1:57:38.1 |
| 9 | Eric Hedlin (CAN) | 1:59:59.5 |
| 10 | Daniel Delgadillo (MEX) | 2:00:07.4 |
| 11 | Arturo Pérez Vertti (MEX) | 2:00:55.2 |
| 12 | Gabriel Villagoiz (ARG) | 2:01:40.6 |
| 13 | Christian Marsden (TTO) | 2:07:53.5 |
| 14 | Cristopher Segura (CRC) | 2:11:42.5 |
| 15 | Rodolfo Sanchez Perez (CRC) | 2:13:47.5 |
| 16 | Emilio Avila Sun (GUA) | 2:19:14.7 |
| 17 | Yilberth Duarte Garcia (GUA) | 2:20:30.2 |
| - | Samuel de Bona (BRA) | DNF |
