= Swimming at the 2014 South American Games – Men's 400 metre freestyle =

Men's 400 metre freestyle at the 2014 South American Games
- Venue: Estadio Nacional
- Dates: March 8, 2014 (heats & finals)
- Competitors: 11 from 6 nations
- Winning time: 3:56.23

Medalists
gold medal	Martín Naidich	Argentina
silver medal	Juan Pereyra	Argentina
bronze medal	Marcos Ferrari	Brazil

The men's 400 metre freestyle competition at the 2014 South American Games took place on March 8 at the Estadio Nacional. The last champion was Alejandro Gómez of Venezuela.

This race consisted of eight lengths of the pool, with all eight being in the freestyle stroke.

== Records ==
Prior to this competition, the existing world and Pan Pacific records were as follows:

World record	Paul Biedermann (GER)	3:40.07	Rome, Italy	July 26, 2009
South American Games record	Alejandro Gómez (VEN)	3:58.41	Medellín, Colombia	March 27, 2010

== Results ==
All times are in minutes and seconds.

KEY:	q	Fastest non-qualifiers	Q	Qualified	CR	Championships record	NR	National record	PB	Personal best	SB	Seasonal best

=== Heats ===
The first round was held on March 8, at 11:00.

Rank	Heat	Lane	Name	Nationality	Time	Notes
1	1	5	Mateo de Angulo	Colombia	4:04.46	Q
2	1	3	Juan Pereyra	Argentina	4:04.53	Q
3	1	4	Martín Naidich	Argentina	4:05.34	Q
4	2	4	Leonardo de Deus	Brazil	4:06.78	Q
5	2	2	Jesus Monge Osorio	Peru	4:06.84	Q
6	2	3	Andy Arteta Gomez	Venezuela	4:07.00	Q
7	1	2	Miguel Tapia Salinas	Chile	4:07.07	Q
8	2	5	Marcos Ferrari	Brazil	4:07.15	Q
9	2	6	Migue Angel Perez	Venezuela	4:08.20	
10	1	6	Julio Galofre	Colombia	4:12.52	
11	2	7	Cristian Zapata Pavez	Chile	4:18.14	

=== Final ===
The final was held on March 8, at 19:10.

Rank	Lane	Name	Nationality	Time	Notes
1st place, gold medalist(s)	3	Martín Naidich	Argentina	3:56.23	CR
2nd place, silver medalist(s)	5	Juan Pereyra	Argentina	3:56.80	
3rd place, bronze medalist(s)	8	Marcos Ferrari	Brazil	3:56.89	
4	4	Mateo de Angulo	Colombia	3:57.07	
5	7	Andy Arteta Gomez	Venezuela	4:01.83	
6	6	Leonardo de Deus	Brazil	4:02.63	
7	2	Jesus Monge Osorio	Peru	4:05.08	
8	1	Miguel Tapia Salinas	Chile	4:05.26	
