= Andorra at the 2023 World Aquatics Championships =

- Flag of Andorra
- FINA code: AND
- National federation: Federació Andorrana de Natació
- Website: www.fan.ad

in Fukuoka, Japan
- Competitors: 2 in 1 sport
- Medals: Gold 0 Silver 0 Bronze 0 Total 0

World Aquatics Championships appearances
- 1973; 1975; 1978; 1982; 1986; 1991; 1994; 1998; 2001; 2003; 2005; 2007; 2009; 2011; 2013; 2015; 2017; 2019; 2022; 2023; 2024

Andorra is set to compete at the 2023 World Aquatics Championships in Fukuoka, Japan from 14 to 30 July.

== Swimming ==
Andorra entered 2 swimmers.

Men

Athlete	Event	Heat		Semifinal		Final	
Athlete	Event	Time	Rank	Time	Rank	Time	Rank
Tomas Lomero Arenas	100 metre freestyle	52.53	76	Did not advance			
Tomas Lomero Arenas	100 metre butterfly	55.60	54	Did not advance			

Women

Athlete	Event	Heat		Semifinal		Final	
Athlete	Event	Time	Rank	Time	Rank	Time	Rank
Nadia Tudo Cubells	100 metre breaststroke	1:13.89	48	Did not advance			
Nadia Tudo Cubells	200 metre breaststroke	2:38.12	29	Did not advance			
