= Andorra at the 2013 World Aquatics Championships =

- Flag of Andorra
- FINA code: AND
- National federation: Federació Andorrana de Natació
- Website: www.fan.ad

in Barcelona, Spain
- Competitors: 3 in 1 sports
- Medals: Gold 0 Silver 0 Bronze 0 Total 0

World Aquatics Championships appearances
- 1973; 1975; 1978; 1982; 1986; 1991; 1994; 1998; 2001; 2003; 2005; 2007; 2009; 2011; 2013; 2015; 2017; 2019; 2022; 2023; 2024

Andorra is competing at the 2013 World Aquatics Championships in Barcelona, Spain between 19 July and 4 August 2013.

== Swimming ==
Andorran swimmers earned qualifying standards in the following events (up to a maximum of 2 swimmers in each event at the A-standard entry time, and 1 at the B-standard):

Men

| Athlete | Event | Heat | | Semifinal | | Final | |
| Athlete | Event | Time | Rank | Time | Rank | Time | Rank |
|---|---|---|---|---|---|---|---|
| Pol Arias | 200 m freestyle | 2:00.44 | 60 | did not advance | | | |
| Pablo Feo | 50 m backstroke | 29.47 | 41 | did not advance | | | |

Women

| Athlete | Event | Heat | | Semifinal | | Final | |
| Athlete | Event | Time | Rank | Time | Rank | Time | Rank |
|---|---|---|---|---|---|---|---|
| Mónica Ramírez | 50 m freestyle | 28.35 | 53 | did not advance | | | |
| Mónica Ramírez | 100 m freestyle | 1:00.98 | 59 | did not advance | | | |
