= Andorra at the 2017 World Aquatics Championships =

- Flag of Andorra
- FINA code: AND
- National federation: Federació Andorrana de Natació
- Website: www.fan.ad

in Budapest, Hungary
- Competitors: 2 in 1 sport
- Medals: Gold 0 Silver 0 Bronze 0 Total 0

World Aquatics Championships appearances
- 1973; 1975; 1978; 1982; 1986; 1991; 1994; 1998; 2001; 2003; 2005; 2007; 2009; 2011; 2013; 2015; 2017; 2019; 2022; 2023; 2024

Andorra competed at the 2017 World Aquatics Championships in Budapest, Hungary from 14 July to 30 July.

== Swimming ==
Andorra has received a Universality invitation from FINA to send two female swimmers to the World Championships.

Athlete	Event	Heat		Semifinal		Final	
Athlete	Event	Time	Rank	Time	Rank	Time	Rank
Mónica Ramírez	Women's 100 m freestyle	58.85	48	did not advance			
Mónica Ramírez	Women's 50 m backstroke	30.96	50	did not advance			
Lea Ricart Martínez	Women's 50 m freestyle	28.61	63	did not advance			
Lea Ricart Martínez	Women's 100 m backstroke	1:08.60	51	did not advance			
