= Andorra at the 2019 World Aquatics Championships =

- Flag of Andorra
- FINA code: AND
- National federation: Federació Andorrana de Natació
- Website: www.fan.ad

in Gwangju, South Korea
- Medals: Gold 0 Silver 0 Bronze 0 Total 0

World Aquatics Championships appearances
- 1973; 1975; 1978; 1982; 1986; 1991; 1994; 1998; 2001; 2003; 2005; 2007; 2009; 2011; 2013; 2015; 2017; 2019; 2022; 2023; 2024

Andorra competed at the 2019 World Aquatics Championships in Gwangju, South Korea from 12 to 28 July.

== Swimming ==
Andorra entered three swimmers.

Men

Athlete	Event	Heat		Semifinal		Final	
Athlete	Event	Time	Rank	Time	Rank	Time	Rank
Bernat Lomero	50 m butterfly	25.24	=58	did not advance			
Bernat Lomero	100 m butterfly	58.12	65	did not advance			

Women

Athlete	Event	Heat		Semifinal		Final	
Athlete	Event	Time	Rank	Time	Rank	Time	Rank
Mónica Ramírez	50 m freestyle	27.17	50	did not advance			
Mónica Ramírez	50 m backstroke	30.53	31	did not advance			
Nàdia Tudó Cubells	50 m breaststroke	33.67	39	did not advance			
Nàdia Tudó Cubells	100 m breaststroke	1:11.53	37	did not advance			
