= Andorra at the 2024 World Aquatics Championships =

- Flag of Andorra
- FINA code: AND
- National federation: Andorran Swimming Federation
- Website: www.fan.ad

in Doha, Qatar
- Competitors: 3 in 1 sport
- Medals: Gold 0 Silver 0 Bronze 0 Total 0

World Aquatics Championships appearances
- 1973; 1975; 1978; 1982; 1986; 1991; 1994; 1998; 2001; 2003; 2005; 2007; 2009; 2011; 2013; 2015; 2017; 2019; 2022; 2023; 2024

Andorra competed at the 2024 World Aquatics Championships in Doha, Qatar from 2 to 18 February.

== Competitors ==
The following is the list of competitors in the Championships.

Sport	Men	Women	Total
Swimming	2	1	3
Total	2	1	3

== Swimming ==
Andorra entered 3 swimmers.

Men

Athlete	Event	Heat		Semifinal		Final	
Athlete	Event	Time	Rank	Time	Rank	Time	Rank
Bernat Lomero	50 metre freestyle	23.47	50	Did not advance			
Bernat Lomero	100 metre freestyle	52.53	68	Did not advance			
Patrick Pelegrina	50 metre breaststroke	28.68	36	Did not advance			
Patrick Pelegrina	100 metre breaststroke	1:03.08	42	Did not advance			

Women

Athlete	Event	Heat		Semifinal		Final	
Athlete	Event	Time	Rank	Time	Rank	Time	Rank
Nadia Tudo	200 metre breaststroke	2:37.70	26	Did not advance			
