= Swimming at the 2015 Pan American Games – Men's 400 metre freestyle =

Men's 400 metre freestyle at the 2015 Pan American Games
- Venue: CIBC Pan Am/Parapan Am Aquatics Centre and Field House
- Dates: July 17 (preliminaries and finals)
- Competitors: 18 from 12 nations
- Winning time: 3:48.29

Medalists
Gold medal	Ryan Cochrane	Canada
Silver medal	Ryan Feeley	United States
Bronze medal	Leonardo de Deus	Brazil

The men's 400 metre freestyle competition of the swimming events at the 2015 Pan American Games took place on July 17 at the CIBC Pan Am/Parapan Am Aquatics Centre and Field House in Toronto, Canada. The defending Pan American Games champion was Charlie Houchin of the United States.

This race consisted of eight lengths of the pool in freestyle. The top eight swimmers from the heats would qualify for the A final (where the medals would be awarded), while the next best eight swimmers would qualify for the B final.

== Records ==
Prior to this competition, the existing world and Pan American Games records were as follows:

World record	Paul Biedermann (GER)	3:40.07	Rome, Italy	July 26, 2009
Pan American Games record	Matt Paton (USA)	3:49.77	Rio de Janeiro, Brazil	July 18, 2007

The following new records were set during this competition.

Date	Event	Name	Nationality	Time	Record
17 July	A Final	Ryan Cochrane	Canada	3:48.29	GR

== Qualification ==
Each National Olympic Committee (NOC) was able to enter up to two entrants providing they had met the A standard (3:57.29) in the qualifying period (January 1, 2014 to May 1, 2015). NOCs were also permitted to enter one athlete providing they had met the B standard (4.11.53) in the same qualifying period. All other competing athletes were entered as universality spots.

== Schedule ==
All times are Eastern Time Zone (UTC-4).

Date	Time	Round
July 17, 2015	10:51	Heats
July 17, 2015	20:01	Final B
July 17, 2015	20:09	Final A

== Results ==
KEY:	q	Fastest non-qualifiers	Q	Qualified	GR	Games record	NR	National record	PB	Personal best	SB	Seasonal best

=== Heats ===
The first round was held on July 17.

Rank	Heat	Lane	Name	Nationality	Time	Notes
1	3	4	Ryan Cochrane	Canada	3:50.58	QA
2	1	4	Leonardo de Deus	Brazil	3:51.40	QA
3	2	5	Michael Klueh	United States	3:51.76	QA
4	2	4	Ryan Feeley	United States	3:51.79	QA
5	3	5	Jeremy Bagshaw	Canada	3:52.13	QA
6	1	6	Cristian Quintero	Venezuela	3:52.63	QA
7	1	3	Mateo de Angulo	Colombia	3:53.01	QA
8	3	6	Ricardo Vargas	Mexico	3:53.40	QA
9	3	3	Lucas Kanieski	Brazil	3:53.80	QB
10	1	2	Christian Bayo	Puerto Rico	3:53.93	QB
11	2	2	Rafael D'Avila	Venezuela	3:54.23	QB
12	2	3	Martin Naidich	Argentina	3:54.44	QB
13	1	5	Marcelo Acosta	El Salvador	3:54.83	QB
14	2	7	Tomas Peribonio	Ecuador	3:55.70	QB
15	3	2	Juan Martin Pereyra	Argentina	3:56.86	QB
16	2	6	Arturo Perez Vertti	Mexico	4:00.28	QB
17	3	7	Alex Sobers	Barbados	4:01.77	
18	1	7	Noah Mascoll-Gomes	Antigua and Barbuda	4:13.55	

=== B Final ===
The B final was also held on July 17.

Rank	Lane	Name	Nationality	Time	Notes
9	6	Marcelo Acosta	El Salvador	3:51.12	
10	4	Lucas Kanieski	Brazil	3:52.73	
11	3	Rafael D'Avila	Venezuela	3:53.76	
12	5	Christian Bayo	Puerto Rico	3:54.11	
13	2	Tomas Peribonio	Ecuador	3:57.49	
14	7	Juan Martin Pereyra	Argentina	3:59.65	
15	8	Alex Sobers	Barbados	4:00.25	
16	1	Arturo Perez Vertti	Mexico	4:00.96	

=== A Final ===
The A final was also held on July 17.

Rank	Lane	Name	Nationality	Time	Notes
1st place, gold medalist(s)	4	Ryan Cochrane	Canada	3:48.29	GR
2nd place, silver medalist(s)	6	Ryan Feeley	United States	3:49.69	
3rd place, bronze medalist(s)	5	Leonardo de Deus	Brazil	3:50.30	
4	3	Michael Klueh	United States	3:50.53	
5	2	Jeremy Bagshaw	Canada	3:50.55	
6	1	Mateo de Angulo	Colombia	3:51.38	NR
7	7	Cristian Quintero	Venezuela	3:52.92	
8	8	Ricardo Vargas	Mexico	3:55.42	
