= Faroe Islands at the 2017 World Aquatics Championships =

- Flag of the Faroe Islands
- World Aquatics code: FAR
- National federation: Svimjisamband Føroya
- Website: www.ssf.fo

in Budapest, Hungary
- Competitors: 4 in 1 sport
- Medals: Gold 0 Silver 0 Bronze 0 Total 0

World Aquatics Championships appearances
- 2007; 2009; 2011; 2013; 2015; 2017; 2019; 2022; 2023; 2024; 2025

The Faroe Islands competed at the 2017 World Aquatics Championships in Budapest, Hungary from 14 July to 30 July.

== Swimming ==
The Faroe Islands has received a Universality invitation from FINA to send a maximum of four swimmers (two men and two women) to the World Championships.

Athlete	Event	Heat		Semifinal		Final	
Athlete	Event	Time	Rank	Time	Rank	Time	Rank
Óli Mortensen	Men's 800 m freestyle	8:16.25	28	—N/a		Did not advance	
Óli Mortensen	Men's 1500 m freestyle	15:37.77	34	—N/a		Did not advance	
Roland Toftum	Men's 50 m breaststroke	30.16	57	Did not advance			
Roland Toftum	Men's 100 m breaststroke	1:07.22	63	Did not advance			
Signhild Joensen	Women's 100 m backstroke	1:04.50	41	Did not advance			
Signhild Joensen	Women's 200 m backstroke	2:19.11	29	Did not advance			
Sara Nysted	Women's 200 m individual medley	2:26.48	32	Did not advance			
Sara Nysted	Women's 400 m individual medley	5:21.21	27	—N/a		Did not advance	
Óli Mortensen; Roland Toftum; Signhild Joensen; Sara Nysted	Mixed 4×100 m freestyle relay	DNS		—N/a		Did not advance	
Óli Mortensen; Roland Toftum; Signhild Joensen; Sara Nysted	Mixed 4×100 m medley relay	4:10.29	19	—N/a		Did not advance	
