= Swimming at the 2011 Pan American Games – Men's marathon 10 kilometres =

Men's marathon 10 kilometres at the 2011 Pan American Games
- Venue: API Maritime Terminal
- Date: 22 October 2011
- Competitors: 17 from 12 nations

Medalists
Gold medal	Richard Weinberger	Canada
Silver medal	Arthur Frayler	United States
Bronze medal	Guillermo Bertola	Argentina

The men's marathon 10 kilometres competition of the swimming events at the 2011 Pan American Games took place on 22 October 2011 at the API Maritime Terminal in Puerto Vallarta, Mexico. The defending Pan American Games champion was Fran Crippen of the United States.

== Schedule ==
All times are Central Standard Time (UTC-6).

Date	Time	Round
22 October 2011	9:05	Final

== Results ==
17 competitors from 12 countries competed.

Rank	Swimmer	Time
1st place, gold medalist(s)	Richard Weinberger (CAN)	1:57:31.0
2nd place, silver medalist(s)	Arthur Frayler (USA)	1:57:31.3
3rd place, bronze medalist(s)	Guillermo Bertola (ARG)	1:57:33.9
4	Ivan Enderica (ECU)	1:57:34.6
5	Ivan De Jesus Lopez (MEX)	1:58:21.3
6	Erwin Maldonado (VEN)	1:58:21.5
7	Allan do Carmo (BRA)	1:58:37.3
8	Luis Escobar (MEX)	1:58:49.6
9	Angel Moreira (VEN)	2:03:13.6
10	Santiago Endercia (ECU)	2:03:25.6
11	Damian Blaum (ARG)	2:05:00.5
12	Samuel de Bona (BRA)	2:08:28.4
13	Nathaniel Ramos (PUR)	2:11:39.0
14	Rodolfo Sanchez (CRC)	2:11:53.1
15	Kevin Vazquez (GUA)	2:16:34.4
16	Omar Nuñez (NCA)	2:19:16.8
17	Miguel Portes (DOM)	2:19:18.0
