= Swimming at the 2010 South American Games – Men's 800 metre freestyle =

The Men's 800m freestyle event at the 2010 South American Games was held on March 26, with the slow heat at 10:12 and the fast heat at 18:06.

== Medalists ==
Gold	Silver	Bronze
Lucas Kanieski; Brazil	Luiz Arapiraca; Brazil	Alejandro Gomez; Venezuela

== Records ==
Standing records prior to the 2010 South American Games
World record	Zhang Lin (CHN)	7:32.12	Rome, Italy	29 July 2009
Competition Record	Luiz Lima (BRA)	8:11.87	Buenos Aires, Argentina	15 November 2006
South American record	Luiz Arapiraca (BRA)	7:58.20	Rio de Janeiro, Brazil	9 May 2009

== Results ==
=== Final ===
Rank	Heat	Lane	Athlete	Result	Notes
1st place, gold medalist(s)	2	5	Lucas Kanieski (BRA)	8:09.81	CR
2nd place, silver medalist(s)	2	4	Luiz Arapiraca (BRA)	8:16.93	
3rd place, bronze medalist(s)	2	2	Alejandro Gomez (VEN)	8:17.68	
4	2	3	Esteban Paz (ARG)	8:18.49	
5	2	6	Ricardo Monasterio (VEN)	8:23.07	
6	2	7	Martin Naidich (ARG)	8:32.50	
7	1	4	Miguel Peñaloza (COL)	8:33.95	
8	2	1	Mateo de Angulo (COL)	8:35.62	
9	1	5	Alvaro Pfeifer (CHI)	8:54.16	
10	1	3	Julio Laurentino (PAR)	9:38.04	
