= Swimming at the 2010 South American Games – Men's 400 metre freestyle =

The Men's 400m freestyle event at the 2010 South American Games was held on March 27, with the heats at 10:48 and the Final at 18:15.

== Medalists ==
Gold	Silver	Bronze
Alejandro Gómez; Venezuela	Lucas Kanieski; Brazil	Julio Galofre; Colombia

== Records ==
Standing records prior to the 2010 South American Games
World record	Paul Biedermann (GER)	3:40.07	Rome, Italy	26 July 2009
Competition Record	Erwin Maldonado (VEN)	3:59.57	Buenos Aires, Argentina	16 November 2006
South American record	Ricardo Monasterio (VEN)	3:50.01	Santo Domingo, Dominican Republic	14 August 2003

== Results ==
=== Heats ===
Rank	Heat	Lane	Athlete	Result	Notes
1	2	7	Esteban Enderica (ECU)	4:02.99	Q
2	2	3	Juan Martin Pereyra (ARG)	4:03.35	Q
3	2	6	Sebastián Jahnsen Madico (PER)	4:03.52	Q
4	2	5	Lucas Kanieski (BRA)	4:03.60	Q
5	1	3	Daniele Tirabassi (VEN)	4:03.84	Q
6	1	5	Julio Galofre (COL)	4:04.00	Q
7	1	4	Esteban Paz (ARG)	4:04.17	Q
8	1	6	Alejandro Gómez (VEN)	4:04.30	Q
9	2	2	Mateo de Angulo (COL)	4:04.58	
10	2	4	Rodrigo Castro (BRA)	4:05.25	
11	1	2	Ivan Alejandro Ochoa (ECU)	4:05.59	
12	1	7	Sebastian Arispe Silva (PER)	4:12.49	
13	2	1	Alvaro Pfeifer (CHI)	4:22.72	
14	1	1	Julio Laurentino (PAR)	4:41.81	

=== Final ===
Rank	Lane	Athlete	Result	Notes
1st place, gold medalist(s)	8	Alejandro Gómez (VEN)	3:58.41	CR
2nd place, silver medalist(s)	6	Lucas Kanieski (BRA)	13:58.58	
3rd place, bronze medalist(s)	7	Julio Galofre (COL)	3:58.78	
4	2	Daniele Tirabassi (VEN)	3:59.63	
5	5	Juan Martin Pereyra (ARG)	4:01.51	
6	1	Esteban Paz (ARG)	4:01.57	
7	4	Esteban Enderica (ECU)	4:03.22	
8	3	Sebastián Jahnsen Madico (PER)	4:04.65	
