= Swimming at the 2010 South American Games – Men's 1500 metre freestyle =

The Men's 1,500m freestyle event at the 2010 South American Games was held on March 28, with the slow heat at 10:15 and the fast heat at 18:00.

== Medalists ==
Gold	Silver	Bronze
Luiz Arapiraca; Brazil	Lucas Kanieski; Brazil	Alejandro Gómez; Venezuela

== Records ==
Standing records prior to the 2010 South American Games
World record	Grant Hackett (AUS)	14:34.56	Fukuoka, Japan	29 July 2001
Games Record	Luiz Lima (BRA)	15:38.98	Buenos Aires, Argentina	17 November 2006
South American record	Luiz Arapiraca (BRA)	15:13.13	Palhoça, Brazil	2 September 2009

== Results ==
=== Final ===
Rank	Heat	Lane	Athlete	Result	Notes
1st place, gold medalist(s)	2	4	Luiz Arapiraca (BRA)	15:41.91	
2nd place, silver medalist(s)	2	5	Lucas Kanieski (BRA)	15:43.69	
3rd place, bronze medalist(s)	2	7	Alejandro Gómez (VEN)	15:53.07	
4	2	8	Esteban Enderica (ECU)	15:56.24	
5	2	3	Esteban Paz (ARG)	15:58.26	
6	2	6	Ricardo Monasterio (VEN)	16:02.81	
7	1	4	Mateo de Angulo (COL)	16:16.59	
8	1	3	Miguel Peñaloza (COL)	16:19.16	
9	2	1	Ivan Alejandro Ochoa (ECU)	16:21.44	
10	2	2	Juan Martin Pereyra (ARG)	16:22.87	
11	1	5	Roberto Penailillo (CHI)	16:39.93	
12	1	6	Alvaro Pfeifer (CHI)	17:19.96	
13	1	2	Julio Gomez Laurentino (PAR)	18:47.30	
