= Faroe Islands at the 2019 World Aquatics Championships =

- Flag of the Faroe Islands
- FINA code: FAR
- National federation: Svimjisamband Føroya
- Website: www.ssf.fo

in Gwangju, South Korea
- Medals: Gold 0 Silver 0 Bronze 0 Total 0

World Aquatics Championships appearances
- 2007; 2009; 2011; 2013; 2015; 2017; 2019; 2022; 2023; 2024

Faroe Islands competed at the 2019 World Aquatics Championships in Gwangju, South Korea from 12 to 28 July.

== Swimming ==
Faroe Islands entered three swimmers.

Men

Athlete	Event	Heat		Semifinal		Final	
Athlete	Event	Time	Rank	Time	Rank	Time	Rank
Alvi Hjelm	200 m individual medley	2:07.91	42	did not advance			
Alvi Hjelm	400 m individual medley	4:33.28	35	—		did not advance	
Oil Mortensen	800 m freestyle	8:24.02	36	—		did not advance	
Oil Mortensen	1500 m freestyle	16:17.71	34	—		did not advance	

Women

Athlete	Event	Heat		Semifinal		Final	
Athlete	Event	Time	Rank	Time	Rank	Time	Rank
Signhild Joensen	100 m backstroke	1:04.04	44	did not advance			
Signhild Joensen	200 m backstroke	2:17.30	34	did not advance			
