= Faroe Islands at the 2013 World Aquatics Championships =

- Flag of the Faroe Islands
- FINA code: FAR
- National federation: Svimjisamband Føroya
- Website: www.ssf.fo

in Barcelona, Spain
- Competitors: 4 in 1 sports
- Medals: Gold 0 Silver 0 Bronze 0 Total 0

World Aquatics Championships appearances
- 2007; 2009; 2011; 2013; 2015; 2017; 2019; 2022; 2023; 2024

Faroe Islands competed at the 2013 World Aquatics Championships in Barcelona, Spain between 19 July and 4 August 2013.

== Swimming ==
Faroese swimmers achieved qualifying standards in the following events (up to a maximum of 2 swimmers in each event at the A-standard entry time, and 1 at the B-standard):

Men

Athlete	Event	Heat		Semifinal		Final	
Athlete	Event	Time	Rank	Time	Rank	Time	Rank
Bartal Hestoy	200 m individual medley	2:09.46	47	did not advance			
Bartal Hestoy	400 m individual medley	4:35.37	38	—		did not advance	
Pál Joensen	800 m freestyle	7:50.81	6 Q	—		7:52.57	7
Pál Joensen	1500 m freestyle	14:57.76	5 Q	—		15:03.10	7

Women

Athlete	Event	Heat		Semifinal		Final	
Athlete	Event	Time	Rank	Time	Rank	Time	Rank
Birita Debes	50 m backstroke	30.57	40	did not advance			
Birita Debes	100 m backstroke	1:05.64	40	did not advance			
Poula Mohr	50 m butterfly	28.52	41	did not advance			
Poula Mohr	100 m butterfly	1:04.58	41	did not advance			
