= Merkid =

Merkid may refer to:

- Merkit, a clan or a tribe of the Mongols
- Flag of the Faroe Islands, also known as Merkið
