= Andorra at the World Athletics Championships =

- WA code: AND
- National federation: Andorran Athletics Federation
- Website: www.faa.ad
- Medals: Gold 0 Silver 0 Bronze 0 Total 0

World Athletics Championships appearances (overview)
- 1991; 1993; 1995; 1997; 1999; 2001; 2003; 2005; 2007; 2009; 2011; 2013; 2015; 2017; 2019; 2022; 2023; 2025

Andorra has competed at the World Athletics Championships on thirteen occasions, all editions from the 1991 World Championships in Athletics onwards. Its competing country code is AND. The country has not won any medals at the competition and as of 2017 no Andorran athlete has reached the top eight of an event. Its best performance is by Antoni Bernadó, who placed 26th in the 2005 men's marathon.

== 2019 ==
Andorra competed at the 2019 World Athletics Championships in Doha, Qatar, from 27 September to 6 October 2019. Andorra was represented by 1 athlete.

Athlete	Event	Heat		Semifinal		Final	
Athlete	Event	Result	Rank	Result	Rank	Result	Rank
Pol Moya	800 metres	1:48.52	37	Did not advance			
