= Faroe Islands at the 2024 World Aquatics Championships =

- Flag of the Faroe Islands
- FINA code: FRO
- National federation: Faroe Islands Aquatics Federation
- Website: ssf.fo

in Doha, Qatar
- Competitors: 1 in 1 sport
- Medals: Gold 0 Silver 0 Bronze 0 Total 0

World Aquatics Championships appearances
- 2007; 2009; 2011; 2013; 2015; 2017; 2019; 2022; 2023; 2024

Faroe Islands competed at the 2024 World Aquatics Championships in Doha, Qatar from 2 to 18 February.

== Competitors ==
The following is the list of competitors in the Championships.

Sport	Men	Women	Total
Swimming	1	0	1
Total	1	0	1

== Swimming ==
Faroe Islands entered 1 swimmers.

Men

Athlete	Event	Heat		Semifinal		Final	
Athlete	Event	Time	Rank	Time	Rank	Time	Rank
Liggjas Joensen	400 metre freestyle	4:08.59	49	—		Did not advance	
Liggjas Joensen	800 metre freestyle	8:32.54	40	—		Did not advance	
