= Connor Jaeger =

American swimmer

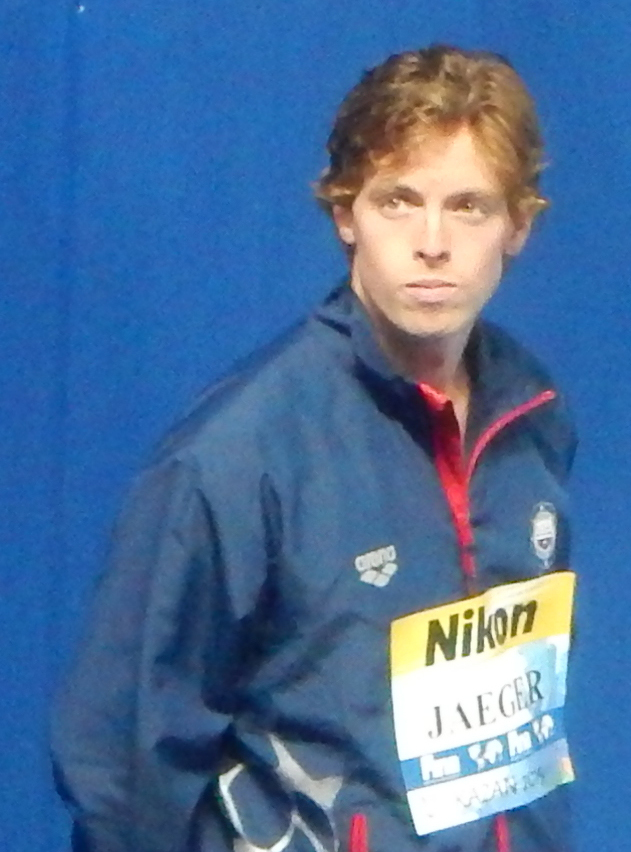
- Jaeger at the 2015 World Championships

Personal information
- National team: United States
- Born: April 30, 1991 (age 35) Fair Haven, New Jersey, U.S.
- Height: 6 ft 0 in (183 cm)
- Weight: 170 lb (77 kg)
- Spouse: Courtney Beidler (m. 2018)

Sport
- Sport: Swimming
- Strokes: Freestyle
- College team: University of Michigan
Medal record
Men's swimming
Representing the United States
Olympic Games
Silver medal – second place	2016 Rio de Janeiro	1500 m freestyle
World Championships (LC)
Silver medal – second place	2015 Kazan	1500 m freestyle
Bronze medal – third place	2013 Barcelona	400 m freestyle
Pan Pacific Championships
Gold medal – first place	2014 Gold Coast	1500 m freestyle
Bronze medal – third place	2014 Gold Coast	400 m freestyle
Bronze medal – third place	2014 Gold Coast	800 m freestyle

Connor Lee Jaeger (born April 30, 1991) is a former American competition swimmer who specializes in distance freestyle events. Jaeger attended the University of Michigan where he was a three-time All-American. He was a member of the 2012 United States Olympic team, placing sixth in the 1500 metre freestyle at those Olympics, as well as the 2016 United States Olympic team, where he earned a silver medal in the same event. He currently holds the American record in the short course 1500 metre freestyle.

== Early life ==
Jaeger was born in Fair Haven, New Jersey on April 30, 1991. He grew up swimming with his older sister, Dana. He began swimming competitively at 8 years old with the Central Jersey Aquatic Club (CJAC). He made the New Jersey All-Star squad and the Junior Olympics before turning 13.

As a teen, Jaeger worked as a lifeguard while continuing to train with CJAC. In high school, he was named All-State in the 200 yard freestyle and set five conference swimming records. He graduated from Rumson-Fair Haven Regional High School, in 2010 and attended the University of Michigan, where he graduated with a degree in mechanical engineering, in 2014.

== Swimming career ==
Jaeger attended University of Michigan, where he was a member of the Michigan Wolverines swimming and diving team. In 2011, he was part of the NCAA title winning 4×200-yard freestyle relay team and was named to the All-Big Ten first team. In 2012, he became an All-American in three disciplines (500-yard freestyle, 800-yard freestyle relay, 1,650-yard freestyle) and was the Big Ten champion in the latter two. At the 2012 NCAA championships, he finished third in the 1,650-yard freestyle. He also won an award for academic achievement for the 2011–12 school year.

At the 2012 U.S. Olympic Trials, Jaeger made his first Olympic team by finishing second behind Andrew Gemmell in the 1,500-meter freestyle with a time of 14:52.51. With a margin of just thirty-two (0.32) one-hundredths of a second between Gemell and Jaeger, it was one of the closest 1,500-meter finishes in Trials history. Jaeger's swim was also the fifth fastest time in the world during 2012 heading into the Olympics. For Jaeger, it was only the fifth time he ever swam the 1,500 in competition. In the preliminary round of the event, he went under fifteen minutes for the first time in his career, despite miscounting his laps and swimming an extra 100 meters. He also competed in the 400-meter freestyle, and finished sixth in the final with a time of 3:49.55.

At the 2012 Summer Olympics in London, Jaeger swam in the preliminary round of the 1,500-meter freestyle on August 3, qualifying seventh for the final on August 4. In the final, he placed sixth with a time of 14:52.99.

At the 2013 World Aquatics Championships, Jaeger qualified to swim in three individual events: the 400-, 800-, and 1500-meter freestyle. In his first event, the 400-meter freestyle, he placed third in the final with a personal best time of 3:44.85, finishing behind Sun Yang and Kosuke Hagino. In his second event, Jaeger placed 4th in the 800-meter freestyle in a personal best time of 7:44.26, finishing behind Sun Yang, teammate Michael McBroom, and Ryan Cochrane. In his third and last event, the 1500-meter freestyle, Jaeger placed 4th in the final with a personal best time of 14:47.96.

Jaeger qualified for the 2016 Summer Olympics and won a silver medal in the 1500 m freestyle. He retired from competitive swimming following the Olympics.

== Personal bests (long course) ==
As of August 13, 2016

Event	Time	Venue	Date
200 m freestyle	1:47.60	Indianapolis	June 25, 2013
400 m freestyle	3:43.79	Omaha	June 26, 2016
800 m freestyle	7:44.26	Barcelona	July 31, 2013
1500 m freestyle	14:39.48	Rio de Janeiro	August 13, 2016

=== Short course yards ===
Event	Time	Meet	Date
200-yard freestyle	1:33.80	2014 NCAA Men's Division I	March 27, 2014
500-yard freestyle	4:10.84	2013 NCAA Men's Division I	March 28, 2013
1000 yard freestyle	8:41.09	2014 MI U of M PostGrad Quad	October 25, 2014
1650 yard freestyle	14:23.52	2014 AT&T Winter National Champs	June 12, 2014

== Personal life ==
Jaeger became engaged to his girlfriend, Courtney Beidler, on June 18, 2017. They married on October 27, 2018.

== See also ==
- List of University of Michigan sporting alumni
- Michigan Wolverines
