= Swimming at the 2012 Summer Olympics – Men's 1500 metre freestyle =

Men's 1,500 metre freestyle at the Games of the XXX Olympiad
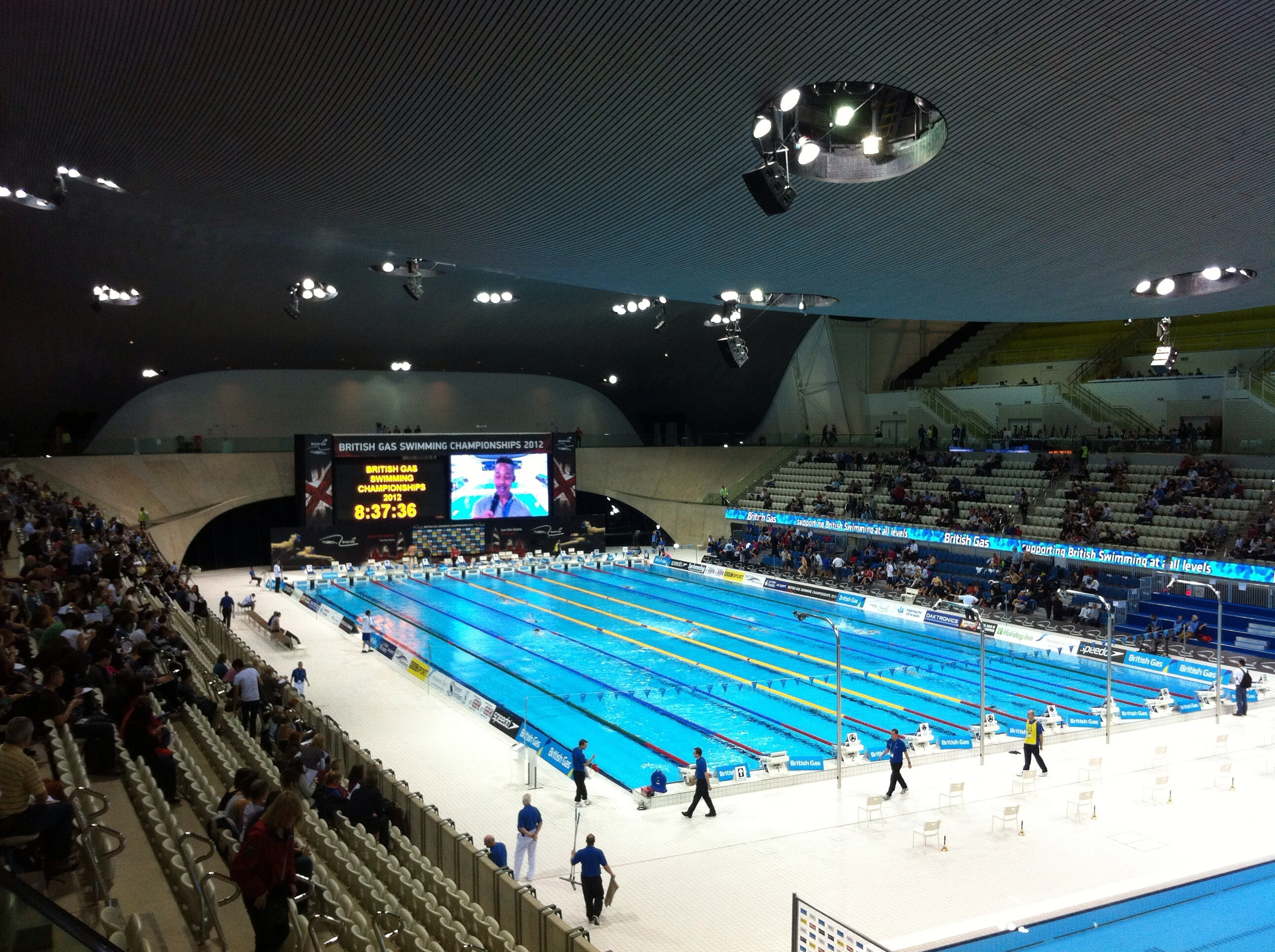
- Aquatics centre during the British Championships in March 2012
- Venue: London Aquatics Centre
- Dates: August 3, 2012 (heats); August 4, 2012 (final)
- Competitors: 31 from 25 nations
- Winning time: 14:31.02 WR

Medalists
1st place, gold medalist(s)		Sun Yang	China
2nd place, silver medalist(s)		Ryan Cochrane	Canada
3rd place, bronze medalist(s)		Oussama Mellouli	Tunisia

The men's 1,500 metre freestyle event at the 2012 Summer Olympics took place on 3–4 August at the London Aquatics Centre in London, United Kingdom.

Shaking off a potential false start due to fan noise, China's Sun Yang put together a marvelous swim with a relentless attack on his world record to strike a long-distance freestyle double at the Olympic Games for the first time, since the Soviet Union's Vladimir Salnikov did so in 1980. Leading from the start, Sun quickly dropped two seconds under a world-record pace, as he pulled away further from the rest of the field to smash his own standard with a stunning gold-medal time in 14:31.02. Trailing behind the leader by 8.61 seconds on a dominant fashion, Canada's Ryan Cochrane held off a close battle from Tunisia's defending champion Oussama Mellouli for the silver in a Canadian record of 14:39.63. Meanwhile, Mellouli faded down the stretch to pick up a bronze in 14:40.31, edging out of South Korea's Park Tae-hwan (14:50.61) by a wide margin of 10.3 seconds.

Italian teenager Gregorio Paltrinieri finished fifth in 14:51.92, while U.S. swimmer Connor Jaeger posted a sixth-place time of 14:52.99. Poland's Mateusz Sawrymowicz (14:54.32) and Great Britain's Daniel Fogg (15:00.76) rounded out a historic finale.

Notable swimmers missed the final including Jaeger's teammate Andrew Gemmell, Ukraine's Sergiy Frolov, Hungary's Gergő Kis, and British home favorite David Davies, bronze medalist in Athens eight years earlier.

== Records ==
At the start of this event, the existing World and Olympic records were as follows.

World record	Sun Yang (CHN)	14:34.14	Shanghai, China	31 July 2011
Olympic record	Grant Hackett (AUS)	14:38.92	Beijing, China	15 August 2008

The following records were established during the competition:

Date	Event	Name	Nationality	Time	Record
August 4	Final	Sun Yang	China	14:31.02	WR

== Results ==
=== Heats ===
Rank	Heat	Lane	Name	Nationality	Time	Notes
1	4	4	Sun Yang	China	14:43.25	Q
2	4	7	Oussama Mellouli	Tunisia	14:46.23	Q
3	3	4	Ryan Cochrane	Canada	14:49.31	Q
4	2	5	Gregorio Paltrinieri	Italy	14:50.11	Q
5	2	3	Daniel Fogg	Great Britain	14:56.12	Q
6	3	5	Park Tae-hwan	South Korea	14:56.89	Q
7	3	3	Connor Jaeger	United States	14:57.56	Q
8	2	6	Mateusz Sawrymowicz	Poland	14:57.59	Q
9	4	3	Andrew Gemmell	United States	14:59.05	
10	4	1	Sergiy Frolov	Ukraine	14:59.19	NR
11	4	6	Job Kienhuis	Netherlands	15:03.16	
12	3	7	Gergely Gyurta	Hungary	15:04.22	
13	2	2	Gabriele Detti	Italy	15:06.22	
14	3	2	Damien Joly	France	15:08.50	
15	3	1	Dai Jun	China	15:13.90	
16	3	6	David Davies	Great Britain	15:14.77	
17	4	5	Pál Joensen	Denmark	15:18.42	
18	4	8	Jarrod Poort	Australia	15:20.82	
19	2	4	Gergő Kis	Hungary	15:21.74	
20	4	2	Anthony Pannier	France	15:24.08	
21	2	7	Heerden Herman	South Africa	15:25.71	
22	1	4	Arturo Pérez Vertti Ferrer	Mexico	15:25.91	
23	2	8	Alejandro Gómez	Venezuela	15:27.38	
24	1	7	Jan Micka	Czech Republic	15:29.34	
25	1	6	Anton Sveinn McKee	Iceland	15:29.40	NR
26	1	5	Ediz Yıldırımer	Turkey	15:29.97	
27	2	1	Matias Koski	Finland	15:34.80	
28	1	3	Ventsislav Aydarski	Bulgaria	15:34.86	
29	3	8	Juan Martín Pereyra	Argentina	15:36.72	
30	1	2	Uladzimir Zhyharau	Belarus	15:48.67	
31	1	1	Ullalmath Gagan	India	16:31.14	

=== Final ===
Rank	Lane	Name	Nationality	Time	Notes
1st place, gold medalist(s)	4	Sun Yang	China	14:31.02	WR
2nd place, silver medalist(s)	3	Ryan Cochrane	Canada	14:39.63	AM
3rd place, bronze medalist(s)	5	Oussama Mellouli	Tunisia	14:40.31	
4	7	Park Tae-hwan	South Korea	14:50.61	
5	6	Gregorio Paltrinieri	Italy	14:51.92	
6	1	Connor Jaeger	United States	14:52.99	
7	8	Mateusz Sawrymowicz	Poland	14:54.32	
8	2	Daniel Fogg	Great Britain	15:00.76	
