= Faroe Islands at the 2023 World Aquatics Championships =

- Flag of the Faroe Islands
- FINA code: FRO
- National federation: Faroe Islands Aquatics Federation
- Website: ssf.fo

in Fukuoka, Japan
- Competitors: 2 in 1 sport
- Medals: Gold 0 Silver 0 Bronze 0 Total 0

World Aquatics Championships appearances
- 2007; 2009; 2011; 2013; 2015; 2017; 2019; 2022; 2023; 2024

Faroe Islands is set to compete at the 2023 World Aquatics Championships in Fukuoka, Japan from 14 to 30 July.

== Swimming ==
Faroe Islands entered 2 swimmers.

Men

Athlete	Event	Heat		Semifinal		Final	
Athlete	Event	Time	Rank	Time	Rank	Time	Rank
Líggjas Joensen	400 metre freestyle	4:09.17	47	—		Did not advance	
Líggjas Joensen	800 metre freestyle	8:41.85	37	—		Did not advance	

Women

Athlete	Event	Heat		Semifinal		Final	
Athlete	Event	Time	Rank	Time	Rank	Time	Rank
Elisabeth Erlendsdóttir	50 metre backstroke	29.94	39	Did not advance			
Elisabeth Erlendsdóttir	200 metre backstroke	2:22.28	36	Did not advance			
