= Faroe Islands at the 2015 World Aquatics Championships =

- Flag of the Faroe Islands
- FINA code: FAR
- National federation: Svimjisamband Føroya
- Website: www.ssf.fo

in Kazan, Russia
- Competitors: 4 in 1 sport
- Medals: Gold 0 Silver 0 Bronze 0 Total 0

World Aquatics Championships appearances
- 2007; 2009; 2011; 2013; 2015; 2017; 2019; 2022; 2023; 2024

Faroe Islands competed at the 2015 World Aquatics Championships in Kazan, Russia from 24 July to 9 August 2015.

== Swimming ==
Faroese swimmers have achieved qualifying standards in the following events (up to a maximum of 2 swimmers in each event at the A-standard entry time, and 1 at the B-standard):

Men

Athlete	Event	Heat		Semifinal		Final	
Athlete	Event	Time	Rank	Time	Rank	Time	Rank
Alvi Hjelm	200 m individual medley	2:08.98	42	did not advance			
Alvi Hjelm	400 m individual medley	4:33.15	40	—		did not advance	
Pál Joensen	800 m freestyle	7:55.01	17	—		did not advance	
Pál Joensen	1500 m freestyle	14:58.52	9	—		did not advance	

Women

Athlete	Event	Heat		Semifinal		Final	
Athlete	Event	Time	Rank	Time	Rank	Time	Rank
Astrið Foldarskarð	50 m freestyle	27.24	61	did not advance			
Astrið Foldarskarð	50 m butterfly	29.00	44	did not advance			
Lena Rannváardóttir	800 m freestyle	9:35.53	41	—		did not advance	
Lena Rannváardóttir	1500 m freestyle	18:21.09	24	—		did not advance	
