= Faroe Islands at the 2022 World Aquatics Championships =

- Flag of the Faroe Islands
- FINA code: FAR
- National federation: Svimjisamband Føroya
- Website: www.ssf.fo

in Budapest, Hungary
- Medals: Gold 0 Silver 0 Bronze 0 Total 0

World Aquatics Championships appearances
- 2007; 2009; 2011; 2013; 2015; 2017; 2019; 2022; 2023; 2024

Faroe Islands competed at the 2022 World Aquatics Championships in Budapest, Hungary from 17 June to 3 July.

== Swimming ==
Faroe Islands entered two swimmers.

Men

| Athlete | Event | Heat | | Semifinal | | Final | |
| Athlete | Event | Time | Rank | Time | Rank | Time | Rank |
|---|---|---|---|---|---|---|---|
| Bartal Eidesgaard | 100 m freestyle | 52.58 | 68 | did not advance | | | |
| Bartal Eidesgaard | 200 m freestyle | 1:57.08 | 53 | did not advance | | | |

Women

| Athlete | Event | Heat | | Semifinal | | Final | |
| Athlete | Event | Time | Rank | Time | Rank | Time | Rank |
|---|---|---|---|---|---|---|---|
| Vár Erlingsdóttir Eidesgaard | 800 m freestyle | 9:16.94 | 21 | — | | did not advance | |
| Vár Erlingsdóttir Eidesgaard | 1500 m freestyle | 17:36.49 | 26 | — | | did not advance | |
