= Swimming at the 2007 Pan American Games – Men's 1500 metre freestyle =

The Men's 1500m Freestyle event at the 2007 Pan American Games took place at the Maria Lenk Aquatic Park in Rio de Janeiro, Brazil. The first two heats were held on 2007-07-20, while the fastest heat based on entry times was staged a day later.

== Medalists ==
Gold	Chip Peterson; United States
Silver	Ricardo Monasterio; Venezuela
Bronze	Kier Maitland; Canada

== Results ==
Rank	Swimmer	Final	
Rank	Swimmer	Time	Heat
1	Chip Peterson (USA)	15:12.33	3
2	Ricardo Monasterio (VEN)	15:23.28	3
3	Kier Maitland (CAN)	15:25.28	3
4	Robert Margalis (USA)	15:34.49	3
5	Luiz Arapiraca (BRA)	15:39.32	3
6	Daniel Delgadillo (MEX)	15:42.86	2
7	Juan Pereyra (ARG)	15:45.96	2
8	Armando Negreiros (BRA)	15:50.23	3
9	Iván López (MEX)	15:55.35	3
10	Roberto Peñailillo (CHI)	15:57.04	2
11	Evan Marcus (GUA)	16:01.36	1
12	Esteban Paz (ARG)	16:02.51	3
13	Erwin Maldonado (VEN)	16:10.79	2
14	Mario Enrique Montoya (CRC)	16:29.19	1
15	Benjamin Guzmán (CHI)	16:34.57	2
16	Douwe Yntema (ESA)	16:57.07	2
17	Juan Lagos (HON)	17:07.88	1
