= Swimming at the 2007 Pan American Games – Men's marathon 10 kilometres =

Men's marathon 10 kilometres at the 2007 Pan American Games
- Venue: Copacabana Beach
- Date: 14 July 2007
- Competitors: 14 from 8 nations

Medalists
Gold medal	Fran Crippen	United States
Silver medal	Charles Peterson	United States
Bronze medal	Allan do Carmo	Brazil

The men's 10 km marathon swim at the 2007 Pan American Games occurred in the waters off Copacabana Beach in Rio de Janeiro, Brazil on 14 July 2007.

== Results ==
KEY:	GR	Games record	NR	National record	PB	Personal best	SB	Seasonal best

Rank	Swimmer	Nationality	Time	Notes
1st place, gold medalist(s)	Fran Crippen	United States	2:02:24.1	
2nd place, silver medalist(s)	Charles Peterson	United States	2:02:29.2	
3rd place, bronze medalist(s)	Allan do Carmo	Brazil	2:03:53.7	
4	Ricardo Monasterio	Venezuela	2:04:32.1	
5	Philippe Dubreul	Canada	2:05:52.0	
6	Manuel Chu	Mexico	2:06:19.6	
7	Ricardo Salas	Venezuela	2:06:22.9	
8	Jarred Ballem	Canada	2:07:05.8	
9	Marcello Soares	Brazil	2:07:38.4	
10	Damián Blaum	Argentina	2:08:03.1	
11	Luis Escobar	Mexico	2:08:08.0	
12	Kurt Niehaus	Costa Rica	2:09:52.5	
13	Roberto Peñailillo	Chile	2:10:10.6	
14	Raul Macedo	Argentina	2:20:06.5	
