= Andorra at the 2009 World Championships in Athletics =

- WA code: AND

in Berlin
- Competitors: 2
- Medals: Gold 0 Silver 0 Bronze 0 Total 0

World Championships in Athletics appearances (overview)
- 1991; 1993; 1995; 1997; 1999; 2001; 2003; 2005; 2007; 2009; 2011; 2013; 2015; 2017; 2019; 2022; 2023

Andorra fielded two competitors at the 2009 World Championships in Athletics in Berlin.

== Team selection ==
Event	Athletes	
Event	Men	Women
800 metres		Natalia Gallego
1500 metres	Victor Martínez	

== Results ==
=== Men ===
Event	Athletes	Heats		Semifinal		Final	
Event	Athletes	Result	Rank	Result	Rank	Result	Rank
1500 m	Victor Martínez	4:02.10	49	did not advance			

=== Women ===
Event	Athletes	Heats		Semifinal		Final	
Event	Athletes	Result	Rank	Result	Rank	Result	Rank
800 m	Natalia Gallego	2:18.75	40	did not advance			
