= Richard Weinberger =

Canadian swimmer

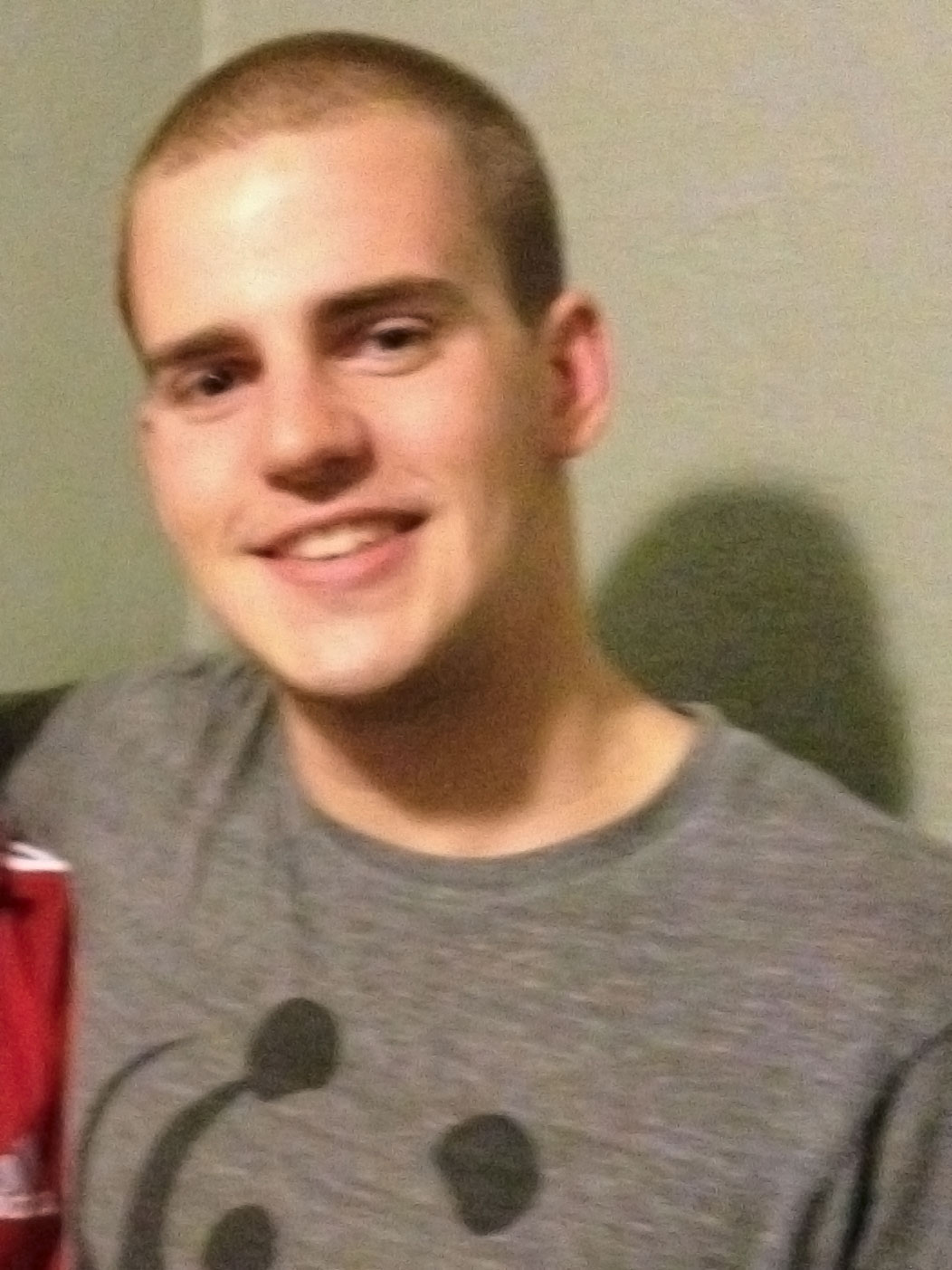
- Weinberger in 2012

Personal information
- National team: Canada
- Born: June 7, 1990 (age 36) Moose Jaw, Saskatchewan, Canada
- Height: 1.90 m (6 ft 3 in)
- Weight: 81 kg (179 lb)

Sport
- Sport: Swimming
- Strokes: Freestyle
- Club: Pacific Coast Swimming (PCS)
- College team: University of Victoria
- Coach: Ron Jacks (PCS); Randy Bennett (Victoria Performance Center)
Medal record
Men's swimming
Representing Canada
Olympic Games
Bronze medal – third place	2012 London	10 km marathon
Pan American Games
Gold medal – first place	2011 Guadalajara	10 km marathon
Pan Pacific Championships
Bronze medal – third place	2010 Irvine	10 km marathon

Richard Weinberger (born June 7, 1990) is a Canadian long-distance swimmer, who attended the University of Victoria, and won a bronze medal at the 2012 Summer Olympics in London in the 10-kilometre open water marathon. He is the 2011 Pan American Games champion and also has a bronze medal from the 2010 Pan Pacific Swimming Championships.

== Early life ==
Richard Weinberger was born in Moose Jaw, Saskatchewan on June 7, 1990 to Tony and Marina Weinberger. The family soon moved to Saudi Arabia where Weinberger learned to swim at a family pool in a residential area in at the age of six. Moves were common as his father served as a commercial pilot. The family lived in various locations besides Saudi Arabia, including Newfoundland and Halifax. Weinberger spent much of his early life in Surrey, British Columbia, where he attended Semiahmoo Secondary School. By 15, already taking an interest in distance swimming, he represented the Surrey Knights Swim Club, where he completed the 1500-meter swim in July 2005 in a personal best time of 18:04.74 at the British Columbia AAA Championships, qualifying him for the Club National Swim Meet in Winnipeg.

== University of Victoria ==
After having begun his open water career, Wienberger relocated to Victoria, British Columbia to attend the University of Victoria from around 2010-2013 where he swam for Head Coach and Director Peter Vizsolyi and had training facilities available at the six-lane McKinnon Pool at the University of Victoria campus, and Victoria's Saanich Commonwealth Place, an outstanding facility with a 50 meter competition pool, a 25-meter lap pool, and a large weight room. Weinberger began training for open water swimming at the University of Victoria after seeing friend Dave Creel doing longer workouts. As a part of the Canadian National Team, he completed additional training at the Victoria Performance center at Victoria's Saanich facility with Coach Randy Bennett, the Head coach for the Canadian National team at the 2012 Olympics.

Weinberger's open water training was conducted by Ron Jacks as part of the Pacific Swim Club. Jacks was a former swimmer for the University of Indiana and three-time Olympic competitor for Canada. A distance competitor himself in his youth, one of Jacks signature Olympic events was the 400 meter freestyle. As noted, Jacks trained Weinberger as part of Pacific Coast Swimming in Victoria which Jacks had help found, and worked as Director after 2002. Jacks had formerly coached Victoria's Island Swimming Club which had many Olympians, and many swimmers who also competed for the University of Victoria. Since November 2005, Jacks has served as the Canadian National Open Water Coach and directed Weinberger in his training with the Canadian team. Pacific Coast Swimming is closely affiliated with the University of Victoria Vikings Swim Program as part of the University of Victoria – Pacific Coast Swimming Association (UVPCS). Weinberger continues to reside and train primarily in Victoria.

== Olympics ==
=== 2012 London ===
At the 2012 London Games, in one of his most significant swims, he won a bronze medal in the 10 km marathon, finishing behind Oussama Mellouli of Tunisia and Thomas Lurz of Germany. The race was held at the Serpentine, the Eastern portion of a Hyde Park Lake. In a very close finish, taking the bronze medal, Weinberger became the first Canadian to medal in the event, completing the long swim with a time of 50:00.3. Weinberger held on to win in a close competition with gold medal winner Ousswama Mellouli of Tunesia who swam a 49:55.1 for the gold, and Thomas Lurz of Germany who swam a 49:58.5. for the silver. He finished only half a second behind the silver medalist Thomas Lurz and just over two seconds behind the gold medalist Ousswama Mellouli. After his win some media outlets such as the CBC were touting him as the future of Canadian Olympian swimmers. Weinberger himself said of his accomplishments that he was pleased with his performance but "I want to be the Olympic champion in Rio in 2016."

=== 2016 Rio de Janeiro ===
Weinberger was named to Canada's Olympic team for the 2016 Summer Olympics in Rio de Janeiro. He headed to Rio with a strong performance at the 2016 FINA World Cup event in Hungary where he won the bronze medal finishing less than half a second behind silver and just over two seconds behind gold. He finished in 17th place in the 10K swim 2016 Summer Olympics with a time of 1:53:16.4

== Non-Olympic competition ==
Weinberger participated in Open water swimming at major international competitions at a relatively young age, achieving in Open Water meets by the age of 19. He started making a name for himself at the 2010 Pan Pacific Championships where he won bronze as a twenty-year-old, then he went on to win the gold at the 2011 Pan American Championships in Guadalajara in the marathon 10 km event. 2012 proved to be a breakthrough year for Weinberger. In the lead up to the 2012 Summer Olympics in London, England, he won bronze and silver medals in the 10 km swim at various World Cup events. Weinberger qualified for the Olympics after he won silver at the FINA Olympic Marathon Swimming Qualifier in June 2012.

During the 2013 World Aquatics Championships Weinberger was unable to repeat his Olympic success in the 10 km event and committed "a fatal mistake" when he missed a buoy and had to retreat from the front of the pack to swim around it again. He did however come within seven tenths of a second of a medal despite this, but only finished fifth. He himself noted his mistake and frustration, stating "I'm one of the strongest guys out there and I know I could have come first. It's just so disappointing that I made such an amateur mistake and I didn't notice the turning buoy pass on my right." Weinberger was looking for redemption in his next event the 25 km but was unable to regain the success where he finished 22nd, finishing fifteen minutes behind the winner Thomas Lurz.

He won the Silver Medal at the 2015 FINA World Cup event in Chun'an China then later that year qualified for the 2016 Summer Olympics by finishing 8th (top 10 qualified) at the FINA World Championships in Kazan, Russia. Richard also went on to finish 3rd at the 2015 Rio Olympic Test Event.

In April 2017, Weinberger was named to Canada's 2017 World Aquatics Championships team in Budapest, Hungary.

== Personal ==
Weinberger had continued to swim and trains with Ron Jacks at Pacific Coast Swimming in Victoria. He admits that swimming in the open water sometimes scares him, as he often encounters wildlife in the water or even the vast depths of the ocean can lead to it getting into his head. He commented on it saying that "If I see anything I'll freak out, but if I don't see anything I'll freak out. It's a lose, lose situation for me."

== See also ==
- List of Olympic medalists in swimming (men)
