= Chip Peterson =

American swimmer (born 1987)

Personal information
- Full name: Charles Bowne Peterson
- Nickname: "Chip"
- National team: United States
- Born: December 3, 1987 (age 38) Morehead City, North Carolina
- Height: 1.82 m (6 ft 0 in)
- Weight: 77 kg (170 lb)

Sport
- Sport: Swimming
- Strokes: Freestyle
- College team: University of North Carolina
Medal record
Men's swimming
Representing the United States
World Championships
Gold medal – first place	2005 Montreal	10 km open water
Silver medal – second place	2005 Montreal	5 km open water
Pan Pacific Championships
Gold medal – first place	2006 Victoria	10 km open water
Gold medal – first place	2010 Irvine	10 km open water
Pan American Games
Gold medal – first place	2007 Rio de Janeiro	1500 m
Gold medal – first place	2015 Toronto	10 km open water
Silver medal – second place	2007 Rio de Janeiro	10 km open water

Charles Bowne "Chip" Peterson (born December 3, 1987) is an American competition swimmer who specializes in long-distance freestyle swimming, especially open water swimming, in which he is a world champion.

== Career ==
At the 2005 World Aquatics Championships, Peterson won gold in the 10 km event and a silver medal position behind Germany's Thomas Lurz in the 5-kilometer event. Peterson was jointly awarded the inaugural Open Water Swimmer of the Year by Swimming World magazine with Lurz. Peterson also earned a gold medal in the 1500 meter freestyle at the 2005 Summer Nationals in Irvine, California. Peterson won gold in the men's 1500 meter freestyle as well as a silver in the men's 10K open water swim at the 2007 Pan American Games held in Rio de Janeiro, Brazil. At the 2010 ACC Swimming and Diving Championships Peterson won the 1650yd freestyle in a time of 14:49.36, fourth in the 500 yard freestyle with a time of 4:20.23. At the 2010 NCAA Swimming and Diving Championships Peterson competed in the 1650, 500, and 200 yard freestyles placing 13th in the 1650 free and 14th in the 500 fr

== Personal ==
Peterson attended the University of North Carolina, where he swam for the North Carolina Tar Heels swimming and diving team. During his freshman year, he set the Tar Heels team records in three events: the 500-, 1000-, and 1650-yard freestyle. At the Atlantic Coast Conference (ACC) championships, Peterson placed second in the 1650-yard freestyle and fifth in the 500-yard freestyle. He was the subject of a feature story that ran in The Daily Tar Heel during the year.

Peterson's father, Pete, is a professor of Marine Sciences at UNC. He was named the 2010 ACC Men's Swimming and Diving Scholar-Athlete of the Year.

While in college, Peterson was diagnosed with ulcerative colitis and ended up having a total colectomy. Inspired by the medical professionals who treated him, he attended medical school and decided to pursue a residency in urology. After two years of residency at the University of Indiana, he returned to UNC to take Internal Medicine.

Awards
Preceded by None	Swimming World; World Open Water Swimmer of the Year; 2005	Succeeded by Thomas Lurz
