= Matias Koski =

Finnish swimmer (born 1994)

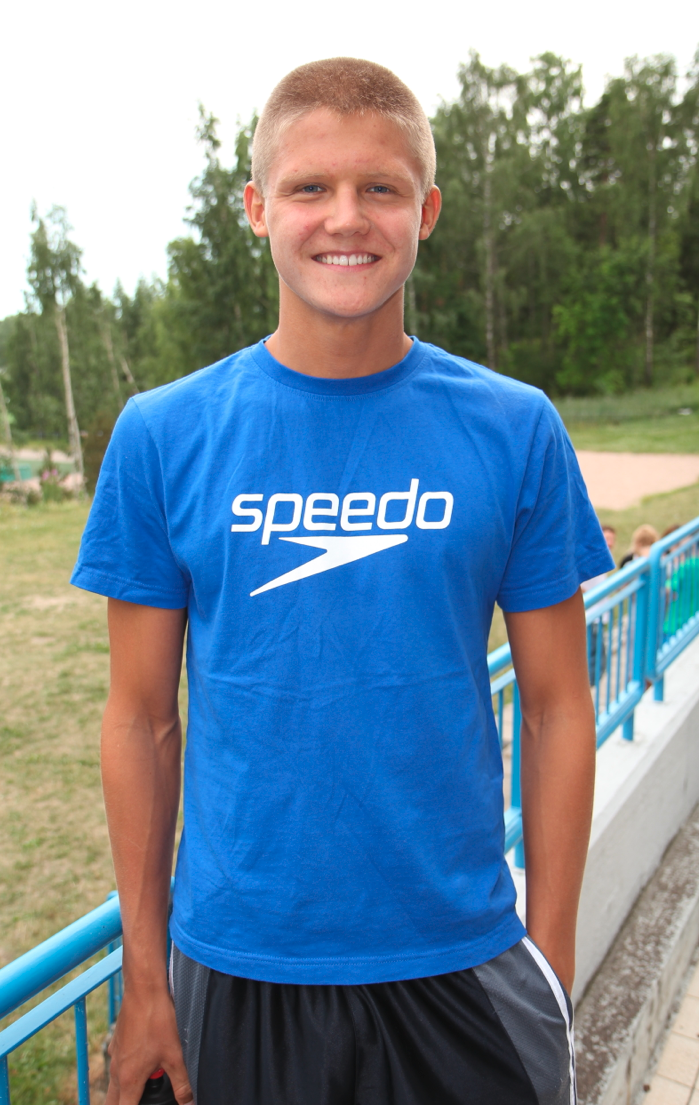
- Koski in 2011

Personal information
- Full name: Matias Mikael Ilmari Koski
- National team: Finland
- Born: 18 May 1994 (age 32) Hämeenlinna, Finland
- Height: 6 ft 5 in (196 cm)
- Weight: 205 lb (93 kg)

Sport
- Sport: Swimming
- Strokes: Freestyle
- Club: Dynamo Swim Club
- College team: University of Georgia (U.S.)

Matias Koski (born 18 May 1994) is a Finnish swimmer. At the 2012 Summer Olympics, he competed in the Men's 400 metre freestyle, finishing in 22nd place in the heats. He also competed in the Men's 200 metre freestyle, winning his heat, but finishing in 31st in the heats and the Men's 1500 metre freestyle, finishing in 26th place in the heats. In his colliegate swimming, Matias won the Men's 1650 Freestyle at the NCAA Championship.

== See also ==
- List of University of Georgia people
