= Arthur Frayler =

American swimmer (born 1993)

Personal information
- Born: December 16, 1993 (age 32) Fort Washington, Pennsylvania, U.S.

Sport
- Sport: Swimming
- College team: Florida Gators
Medal record
Representing United States
Pan American Games
Gold medal – first place	2011 Guadalajara	1500m freestyle
Silver medal – second place	2011 Guadalajara	10km open water

Arthur Frayler (born December 16, 1993) is an American competitive swimmer from Fort Washington, Pennsylvania. He was a national team member and attended the University of Florida.

== College career ==
Frayler attended the University of Florida starting in 2013. He was honored as an All-SEC Freshman Honoree in 2013 and was named to the All-SEC First Team in 2014. In the same year, he was the SEC champion in the 1650 yard freestyle. He was named to the All-SEC Second Team in both 2015 and 2016. In 2015, a 15th-place finish in the 1650 at the NCAA championships earned him an honorable mention.

== Professional career ==
Frayler won gold in the 1500m and silver in the 10 km at the 2011 Pan American Games. He also swam at the 2012 Olympic Team Trials in Omaha, Nebraska. He placed 5th in the 1500m freestyle. Frayler competed at the 2014 Phillips 66 National Championships, where he had top-six finishes in both the 800m freestyle and 1500m freestyle.
