= Michael McBroom =

American swimmer (born 1991)

Personal information
- National team: United States
- Born: May 16, 1991 (age 35) Minneapolis, Minnesota, U.S.
- Died: May 16, 1991
- Occupation: Real Estate
- Height: 6 ft 2 in (188 cm)
- Weight: 170 lb (77 kg)
- Spouse: Becca Tomlin (2016)

Sport
- Sport: Swimming
- Strokes: Freestyle
- Club: The Woodlands Swim Team (TWST)
- College team: University of Minnesota; University of Texas
- Coach: Tim Bauer (TWST); Dennis Dale (U. Minnesota); Eddie Reese (U. Texas); Jack Roach
Medal record
Men's swimming
Representing the United States
World Championships (LC)
Silver medal – second place	2013 Barcelona	800 m freestyle

Michael McBroom (born May 16, 1991) is an American swimmer who specialized in long-distance freestyle events. He was a FINA World Championships silver medalist in the 800-meter freestyle and formerly held the American Record in the 800-meter freestyle.

McBroom was born one of two siblings on May 16, 1991, the son of Rena and Jay McBroom in Plymouth, Minnesota. He attended Woodlands Conroe High School, graduating around 2009. In club competition he swam for Woodlands Swim Team (TWST) under Head Coach Tim Bauer in 2006. At 15, swimming for the Woodlands Swim Team, he made the Junior National Team by swimming a 1,500 meter freestyle at the 2006 Long Course Sectional Championships at the University of Houston in a time of 16:34.82. He continued to swim for the Woodlands Swim Team when in the Houston area through much of his swimming career including in training for the 2016 Olympics. As a High School Senior on February 27, 2009, he qualified for the Texas State 5A championship in Austin in the 200 and 500 freestyle, and later placed sixth in the 200 freestyle, but second in the 500 freestyle finals with a time of 4:28.19.

== Collegiate swimming ==
=== University of Minnesota ===
McBroom attended and swam for the University of Minnesota in his Freshman year from 2009-2010 where he competed for Head Coach Dennis Dale, placing fourth at the NCAA Championships in the 1650 freestyle event.

=== University of Texas ===
McBroom attended the University of Texas from around 2010-2013 where he was coached in swimming by Head Coach Eddie Reese, and was a letter winner each year he competed. Texas had won the 2010 NCAA team national championship in 2010 over the University of California. At Texas, McBroom majored in government with a communications minor. He earned collegiate All American honors a total of five times in events that included the 500, and 1650 freestyle competitions. He held an NCAA record of 8:43.48 in the 1000-yard freestyle, and won an NCAA national title in the 1,650 freestyle in 2011. In academics, he was a member of the Honor Roll for the Big 12 Commissioner in the late 2011 and early 2012 seasons. In the 2011-2012 season he had a personal best in the NCAA National Championship in the 500 freestyle with a time of 4:15.99 during the preliminaries for the event.

=== 2012 Olympic trials ===
In 2012, McBroom missed out on making the Olympic Team by placing 7th in the 1500-meter freestyle and 8th in the 400-meter freestyle.

=== 2013 international meets ===
At the 2013 Phillips National Championships, which also served as the selection meet for the 2013 World Aquatics Championships, McBroom placed 4th in the 400-meter freestyle, and 2nd in the 800-meter and 1500-meter freestyle, qualifying for the World Championships.

McBroom broke out onto the international stage after capturing the silver medal in the 800-meter freestyle at the 2013 World Aquatics Championships with a time of 7:43.60, breaking the American Record in the process.

In 2015, he won a gold medal in the Winter National Championships in the 1500 freestyle.

=== Marriage ===
He married Becca Tomlin in 2016, a former swimmer for the University of Texas who attended Coronado High School in El Paso, and graduated U Texas in 2012.

=== 2016 Olympic trials ===
McBroom placed third in the 1500 freestyle finals at the late July 2016 Olympic trials in Omaha, Nebraska, swimming a 15:07.42, only two seconds behind Jordan Wilimovsky who placed second with a 15:05.89. He barely missing a chance to qualify for the Olympic team which required a second place finish. He had previously held the third fastest qualifying time for the trials in the 1500 with a 14:53.66, and the fourth fastest trials qualifying time for the trials in the 400 freestyle with a 3:46.89. As a result, he planned to retire by early 2017. In his interview, "Catching Up with Michael McBroom", McBroom credited Jack Roach who was an Assistant Coach at University of Texas, and had coached Texas Aquatics as an important influence in his training, and his preparation for the 2016 Olympic trials.

=== Careers ===
After a try at professional swimming, and failing to make the 2016 Olympic trails, McBroom retired from competitive swimming. In career pursuits, he worked in real estate for Austin's Aquila Real Estate, and beginning in late 2016, beginning as an Associate he ascended to the role of a Vice-President for Sonny Brown Real Estate in El Paso, focusing on leasing, sales, and investment.
