= Arturo Pérez Vertti =

Mexican swimmer (born 1991)

Personal information
- Born: Arturo Perez Vertti Ferrer; September 10, 1991 (age 34) Ensenada, Baja California, Mexico
- Height: 185 cm (6 ft 1 in)

Sport
- Sport: Swimming
Medal record
Men's swimming
Representing Mexico
Central American and Caribbean Games
Silver medal – second place	2010 Mayagüez	4×200 m freestyle
Bronze medal – third place	2014 Veracruz	10 km open water

Arturo Perez Vertti Ferrer (born September 10, 1991, in Ensenada, Baja California) is a Mexican swimmer. At the 2012 Summer Olympics, he competed in the Men's 1500 metre freestyle, finishing in 22nd place overall in the heats, failing to qualify for the final. He has also competed at World Short Course and Long Course Championships.
