= Lucas Kanieski =

Brazilian swimmer (born 1990)

Personal information
- Full name: Lucas da Cruz Kanieski
- Nationality: Brazil
- Born: 25 January 1990 (age 36) Dourados, Mato Grosso do Sul, Brazil
- Height: 1.89 m (6 ft 2 in)
- Weight: 78 kg (172 lb)

Sport
- Sport: Swimming
- Strokes: Freestyle
Medal record
Men's swimming
Representing Brazil
Pan American Games
Silver medal – second place	2011 Guadalajara	4x200 m freestyle
South American Games
Gold medal – first place	2010 Medellín	800 m freestyle
Silver medal – second place	2010 Medellín	400 m freestyle
Silver medal – second place	2010 Medellín	1500 m freestyle

Lucas da Cruz Kanieski (born 25 January 1990 in Dourados) is a Brazilian competitive swimmer.

At the 2010 South American Games, Kanieski won the gold medal in the 800-metre freestyle, and two silver medals in the 400-metre and 1500-metre freestyle.

He was at the 2010 Pan Pacific Swimming Championships in Irvine, where he finished 12th in the 800-metre freestyle, 18th in the 1500-metre freestyle and 27th in the 400-metre freestyle.

Kanieski competed at the 2010 FINA World Swimming Championships (25 m), in Dubai, where he finished 23rd in the 400-metre freestyle, eighth in the 1500-metre freestyle and also eighth in the 4×200-metre freestyle. In the 1500-metre freestyle, broke the short-course South American record, with a time of 14:45.51.

At the 2011 Pan American Games, Kanieski won the silver medal in the 4×200-metre freestyle, by participating at heats. Also ranked 5th in the 400-metre freestyle and in the 1500-metre freestyle

At the 2013 FINA Swimming World Cup in Moscow, Russia, Kanieski broke the short-course South American record in the 1500-metre freestyle, with a time of 14:44.66.

At the 2015 Pan American Games in Toronto, Ontario, Canada, Kanieski finished 7th in the 1500-metre freestyle, and 10th in the 400 metre freestyle.

On 13 September 2016, at the José Finkel Trophy (short-course competition), he broke the South American record in the 1500-metre freestyle, with a time of 14:40.31.

At the 2016 FINA World Swimming Championships (25 m) in Windsor, Ontario, Canada, he finished 20th in the Men's 400 metre freestyle and 27th in the Men's 1500 metre freestyle.
