= Andorran Swimming Federation =

Sports governing body in Andorra

LEN
- Association crest
- Founded: 1985
- FINA affiliation: 1985
- LEN affiliation: 1985
- Website: www.fan.ad
- President: Joan Clotet Calvés

Federació Andorrana de Natació (FAN) is the governing body of swimming in Andorra. It is a non-profit organization that was founded in 1985 on a meeting at the Andorran Olympic Committee. It is both a member of European Aquatics and World Aquatics.
