= Andorra at the 2011 World Aquatics Championships =

Sporting event delegation

Flag of Andorra

Andorra competed at the 2011 World Aquatics Championships in Shanghai, China between July 16 and 31, 2011.

== Swimming ==
Andorra qualified 3 swimmers.

Men

| Athlete | Event | Heats | | Semifinals | | Final | |
| Athlete | Event | Time | Rank | Time | Rank | Time | Rank |
|---|---|---|---|---|---|---|---|
| Gerard Baldrich Pujol | Men's 50m Freestyle | 24.64 | 58 | did not advance | | | |
| Gerard Baldrich Pujol | Men's 100m Freestyle | 53.21 | 65 | did not advance | | | |
| Hocine Haciane | Men's 200m Butterfly | 2:04.14 | 35 | did not advance | | | |
| Hocine Haciane | Men's 200m IM | 2:07.14 | 36 | did not advance | | | |

Women

| Athlete | Event | Heats | | Semifinals | | Final | |
| Athlete | Event | Time | Rank | Time | Rank | Time | Rank |
|---|---|---|---|---|---|---|---|
| Monica Ramirez Abella | Women's 50m Backstroke | 30.66 | 45 | did not advance | | | |
| Monica Ramirez Abella | Women's 100m Backstroke | 1:05.56 | 46 | did not advance | | | |
