= Faroe Islands at the 2011 World Aquatics Championships =

Sporting event delegation

Flag of the Faroe Islands

Faroe Islands competed at the 2011 World Aquatics Championships in Shanghai, China between July 16 and 31, 2011.

== Swimming ==
Faroe Islands qualified 1 swimmer.

Men

Athlete	Event	Heats		Semifinals		Final	
Athlete	Event	Time	Rank	Time	Rank	Time	Rank
Pál Joensen	Men's 800m Freestyle	7:45.55	2 Q			7:46.51	5
Pál Joensen	Men's 1500m Freestyle	14:56.66	6 Q			14:46.33	4
