= Alejandro Gómez (swimmer) =

Venezuelan swimmer (born 1985)

Personal information
- Full name: Alejandro Gómez Pérez
- Born: April 22, 1985 (age 41) Caracas, Venezuela
- Height: 184 cm (6 ft 0 in)
- Weight: 77 kg (170 lb)

Sport
- Sport: Swimming
- Strokes: Freestyle
- Club: Gator Swim Club
- College team: Texas Christian university
Medal record
Men's swimming
Pan American Games
Bronze medal – third place	2011 Guadalajara	4x200 m freestyle
South American Games
Gold medal – first place	2002 Belém	1500 m freestyle
Gold medal – first place	2006 Buenos Aires	4x200 m freestyle
Gold medal – first place	2010 Medellín	400 m freestyle
Gold medal – first place	2010 Medellín	4x200 m freestyle
Bronze medal – third place	2006 Buenos Aires	400 m freestyle
Bronze medal – third place	2010 Medellín	800 m freestyle
Bronze medal – third place	2010 Medellín	1500 m freestyle
Bronze medal – third place	2014 Santiago	1500 m freestyle
Gold medal – first place	2010 Mayagüez	800 m freestyle
Gold medal – first place	2010 Mayagüez	1500 m freestyle
Bronze medal – third place	2014 Veracruz	1500 m freestyle

Alejandro Gómez Perez (born 22 April 1985) is a Venezuelan swimmer. At the 2012 Summer Olympics in London, he participated in the men's 1500 metre freestyle, but was eliminated in the qualifying heats. His mother Maria competed in the 1976 Summer Olympics in the 200 and 400m freestyle events.

== Biography ==
Gómez was born on 22 April 1985 in Caracas, Venezuela. He is 184 centimetres (6.04 feet) tall and weighs 77 kilograms (170 pounds). His mother Maria was an Olympic swimmer, and competed in the 1976 Summer Games in the 400m and 200m freestyle events. His father Renny Gómez played water polo at Master's age group and represented Venezuela at master's world champ 3 times – Montreal 94 where they earned a bronze medal, Sheffield 96 and Munich 2000. After graduating from Colegio Santiago de León de Caracas in 2002, Alejandro went to Indian River Community College in Fort Pierce, Florida, and later studied Communication Studies and human relations at Texas Christian University in Fort Worth, Texas, graduating in 2008.

== Swimming ==
Gómez participates in the 1500m men's freestyle event, and the 800m men's freestyle swimming event. In 2010, he entered the 21st Central American and Caribbean Games (Spanish: XXI Juegos Centroamericanos y del Caribe, Mayagüez 2010) in the men's 800 metre freestyle and the men's 1500 metre freestyle, winning both events. His time in the 1500m freestyle final on 18 July 2010 was 15:27.59, and he recorded a time of 8:10.53 in the 800m freestyle final on 20 July 2010. He currently trains with Gator Swim Club, Gainesville, Florida. In the 2012 Summer London Olympic Games, Gómez participated in the 1500 metres men's freestyle swimming event. He finished twenty-third in the qualifying heats with a time of 15:27.38, and was eliminated. Previously, Gómez represented Venezuela and won gold at the South American Games (ODESUR Games).
