= Flag of Andorra =

Principality of Andorra
- Use: State flag
- Proportion: 7:10
- Adopted: 1866; 160 years ago (Tricolor); 1993; 33 years ago (official coat of arms)
- Design: A vertical tricolour of blue, yellow and red with the National Coat of Arms centred on the yellow band.
- Designed by: Napoleon III (traditionally attributed)
- Use: Civil flag and ensign
- Proportion: 7:10
- Adopted: 1866; 160 years ago
- Design: A vertical tricolour of blue, yellow and red.
- Designed by: Napoleon III

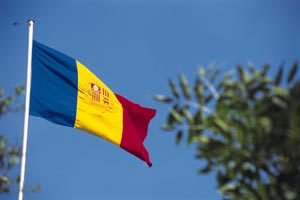
The flag of Andorra in flight

The national flag of Andorra (Bandera d'Andorra) features a vertical tricolour of blue, yellow, and red with the coat of arms of Andorra in the center. The centre yellow bar is slightly wider than the other two so that the ratio of bar widths is 8:9:8 with an overall flag ratio of 7:10.

The civilian variant of the flag without a coat of arms was created in 1866. Although throughout the 19th and 20th century there were variant designs based on this, carrying a variety of arms and occasionally switching from vertical to horizontal stripes, the design was standardized in 1993 after Andorra joined the United Nations.

== Origins and symbolism ==
The design is related to the flags of Catalonia, Foix and France, the lands historically linked with the small country. The coat of arms of Andorra in the center of the flag contains historical symbolism to the Catholic bishop of Urgell, the Count of Foix, the Principality of Catalonia, and the Viscounty of Béarn. The inclusion of the coat of arms makes it one of 28 national flags to contain overtly Christian symbolism and it is one of two national flags to portray cattle, together with the flag of Moldova, which is visually similar and features the head of a bull. A flag of three bars is similar to that of the French tricolor, while the pattern of a wider middle stripe can be noted on the Spanish flag. The motto in the coat of arms (written in Goudy Old Style) in the middle stripe Virtus Unita Fortior means "Virtue United is Stronger". The blue and red of the Andorran flag are also found on the French flag, with red and yellow also being the colors of the Catalonian flag (as the old royal symbol of the Crown of Aragon) and the arms of the old County of Foix (currently part of France).

== Description ==
=== Colors ===
The official colors of the Andorran flag are set out in the "Graphic regulations for reproducing the shield and flag" from the Oficina de Marques del Principat d'Andorra and approved by the government of Andorra on May 5, 1999. The colors of the flag are:

Color model	Blue	Yellow	Red	Khaki
Pantone	Blue 072 C	Yellow C	199 C	PMS 466 C
CMYK	100-99-2-3	2-9-100-0	10-100-86-2	23-30-61-1
HEX	#10069f	#fedd00	#d50032	#c6aa76

== History ==
=== First flag ===
1806–1866

1866–1939

A variant of the modern flag is said to have been designed by Napoleon III, with the blue stripe representing France. The adoption of the new flag coincided with the New Reform led by Guillem d'Areny-Plandolit, who may be the real creator of the flag. The package of reforms was first adopted by the Episcopal Co-Prince, Bishop Josep Caixal i Estradé on April 22, 1866 and three years later by Napoleon III. The flag from this period remains the official civil flag today, but due to its similarity to other national flags it is rarely used.

=== Second flag ===
End of the 19th century

End of the 19th century – c. 1930s

The circumstances surrounding the introduction of the horizontal version of the flag are unknown. It is also unknown whether this was the only version at that time. In his 1898 book "Through the High Pyrenees" by Harold Spender he wrote:

We were not fortunate enough to see the Andorran Council General in session, any more than we witnessed the fetes and dances which were seen by M. Vuillier on the occasion of the Feast of St. Etienne. During the session the Andorran flag—with three horizontal lines of blue, yellow, and red, and a crown in the centre— hangs out of the window. A description of the meeting of the Council has been given by M. Vidal...

Horizontal flags were used until the end of the 1930s, in the meantime, the Spanish flag was changed to a similar one. The flag with crown is sometimes associated with the activities of Boris I, but there is no evidence for this.

=== Later flags ===
1939–1949

1949–1959

1959–1971

Around 1939, the vertical arrangement was returned and a coat of arms was added. The yellow lane was probably widened later. Until the introduction of an official, standardized design in the Constitution of April 28, 1993, the flag variants differed from each other. An additional impulse to unify the flag were the plans to join the United Nations, which took place on 28 July 1993.

== Other flags of Andorra ==
=== Municipal flags ===
Flag	Parish	Adopted	Description
	Andorra la Vella		
	Canillo		
	Encamp		
	Escaldes-Engordany		
	La Massana		
	Ordino		
	Sant Julià de Lòria		

=== Other ===
Flag	Duration	Use	Description
	c 2018–present	Flag of the Andorran Olympic Committee	
	?–present	Flag of the Police Corps of Andorra	
	c 1960s–?	Flag of the Police Corps of Andorra	

== See also ==
- Coat of arms of Andorra
