= Swimming at the 2010 Asian Games – Men's 400 metre freestyle =

Men's 400 metre freestyle at the 2010 Asian Games
- Venue: Aoti Aquatics Centre
- Date: 16 November 2010
- Competitors: 26 from 15 nations

Medalists
gold medal	Park Tae-hwan	South Korea
silver medal	Sun Yang	China
bronze medal	Zhang Lin	China

The men's 400 metre freestyle event at the 2010 Asian Games took place on 16 November 2010 at Guangzhou Aoti Aquatics Centre.

There were 26 competitors from 15 countries who took part in this event. Four heats were held. The heat in which a swimmer competed did not formally matter for advancement, as the swimmers with the top eight times from the entire field qualified for the finals.

Defending champion Park Tae-hwan from South Korea won the gold medal with 3 minutes 41.53 seconds, Sun Yang from China finished with second place, Asian record holder Zhang Lin won the bronze medal.

== Schedule ==
All times are China Standard Time (UTC+08:00)

Date	Time	Event
Tuesday, 16 November 2010	09:27	Heats
Tuesday, 16 November 2010	18:22	Final

== Records ==
Prior to this competition, the existing world, Asian and Games records were as follows.

World Record	Paul Biedermann (GER)	3:40.07	Rome, Italy	26 July 2009
Asian Record	Zhang Lin (CHN)	3:41.35	Rome, Italy	20 August 2006
Games Record	Park Tae-hwan (KOR)	3:48.44	Doha, Qatar	5 December 2006

== Results ==
=== Heats ===
Rank	Heat	Athlete	Time	Notes
1	2	Sun Yang (CHN)	3:53.08	
2	3	Zhang Lin (CHN)	3:54.62	
3	4	Takeshi Matsuda (JPN)	3:55.02	
4	3	Sho Uchida (JPN)	3:55.70	
5	4	Park Tae-hwan (KOR)	3:55.80	
6	4	Jang Sang-jin (KOR)	3:59.80	
7	2	Sarit Tiewong (THA)	4:00.49	
8	2	Danny Yeo (SIN)	4:00.62	
9	4	Oleg Rabota (KAZ)	4:02.28	
10	4	Kevin Yeap (MAS)	4:02.67	
11	3	Ryan Arabejo (PHI)	4:03.36	
12	2	Clement Lim (SIN)	4:03.96	
13	3	Sobitjon Amilov (UZB)	4:05.77	
14	3	Jessie Lacuna (PHI)	4:06.38	
15	4	Triady Fauzi Sidiq (INA)	4:07.72	
16	4	Mandar Divase (IND)	4:08.22	
17	1	Ahmad Al-Shatti (IOC)	4:10.37	
18	3	Punyawee Sontana (THA)	4:10.80	
19	4	Loai Tashkandi (KSA)	4:12.63	
20	2	Alexandr Ivanov (KAZ)	4:13.03	
21	3	Kevin Lim (MAS)	4:13.93	
22	2	Kent Cheung (HKG)	4:17.72	
23	2	Cheung Siu Hang (HKG)	4:19.36	
24	3	Hazem Tashkandi (KSA)	4:25.96	
25	1	Abdulaziz Al-Marzooqi (QAT)	4:44.99	
26	1	Ibrahim Al-Amadi (QAT)	4:52.35	

=== Final ===
Rank	Athlete	Time	Notes
1st place, gold medalist(s)	Park Tae-hwan (KOR)	3:41.53	GR
2nd place, silver medalist(s)	Sun Yang (CHN)	3:42.47	
3rd place, bronze medalist(s)	Zhang Lin (CHN)	3:49.15	
4	Takeshi Matsuda (JPN)	3:51.65	
5	Sho Uchida (JPN)	3:53.42	
6	Jang Sang-jin (KOR)	3:55.34	
7	Danny Yeo (SIN)	4:00.67	
8	Sarit Tiewong (THA)	4:03.59	
