= Swimming at the 2018 Asian Games – Men's 200 metre freestyle =

Men's 200 metre freestyle at the 2018 Asian Games
- Venue: Gelora Bung Karno Aquatic Stadium
- Date: 19 August 2018
- Competitors: 34 from 22 nations

Medalists
gold medal	Sun Yang	China
silver medal	Katsuhiro Matsumoto	Japan
bronze medal	Ji Xinjie	China

The men's 200 metre freestyle event at the 2018 Asian Games took place on 19 August at the Gelora Bung Karno Aquatic Stadium.

During the medal ceremony, the flags of the three medalists crashed to the ground due to a technical malfunction. Sun Yang, the Chinese swimmer and the gold medalist of the event, immediately got off the podium, walked to some officials and demanded the medal ceremony to be conducted once again. The flags were re-attached to the broken hoist but couldn't be raised, and the Chinese anthem was played for a second time.

== Schedule ==
All times are Western Indonesia Time (UTC+07:00)

Date	Time	Event
Sunday, 19 August 2018	09:19	Heats
Sunday, 19 August 2018	18:22	Final

== Records ==
Prior to this competition, the existing world, Asian and Games records were as follows.

World Record	Paul Biedermann (GER)	1:42.00	Rome, Italy	28 July 2009
Asian Record	Sun Yang (CHN)	1:44.39	Budapest, Hungary	25 July 2017
Games Record	Park Tae-hwan (KOR)	1:44.80	Guangzhou, China	14 November 2010

== Results ==
=== Heats ===
Rank	Heat	Athlete	Time	Notes
1	5	Sun Yang (CHN)	1:47.58	
2	3	Khader Baqlah (JOR)	1:47.60	
3	3	Naito Ehara (JPN)	1:47.76	
4	4	Katsuhiro Matsumoto (JPN)	1:47.94	
5	4	Welson Sim (MAS)	1:48.47	
6	3	Lee Ho-joon (KOR)	1:48.49	
7	5	Ji Xinjie (CHN)	1:48.85	
8	5	Hoàng Quý Phước (VIE)	1:49.68	
9	3	Danny Yeo (SGP)	1:50.39	
10	4	Jang Dong-hyeok (KOR)	1:50.48	
11	3	Aflah Fadlan Prawira (INA)	1:50.78	
12	3	Matthew Abeysinghe (SRI)	1:50.97	
13	4	Mokhtar Al-Yamani (YEM)	1:51.14	
14	5	Jonathan Tan (SGP)	1:51.52	
15	3	Aleksey Tarasenko (UZB)	1:52.02	
16	5	An Ting-yao (TPE)	1:52.38	
17	1	Adil Kaskabay (KAZ)	1:53.37	
18	5	Putera Muhammad Randa (INA)	1:53.88	
19	4	Khurshidjon Tursunov (UZB)	1:53.93	
20	5	Andrew Newling (THA)	1:54.17	
21	4	Keith Lim (MAS)	1:54.22	
22	4	Alireza Yavari (IRI)	1:54.28	
23	4	Chan Chun Hei (HKG)	1:54.59	
24	1	Saurabh Sangvekar (IND)	1:54.87	
25	5	Kent Cheung (HKG)	1:54.90	
26	2	Kavindra Nugawela (SRI)	1:56.01	
27	3	Issa Al-Adawi (OMA)	1:58.19	
28	1	Firas Saidi (QAT)	2:01.59	
29	2	Youssef Hesham Mohamed (QAT)	2:06.28	
30	2	Mubal Azzam Ibrahim (MDV)	2:11.26	
31	2	Adam Barghouthy (PLE)	2:15.07	
32	2	Boldbaataryn Batmönkh (MGL)	2:15.60	
33	2	Ali Imaan (MDV)	2:17.58	
34	2	Gotsbayaryn Tengis (MGL)	2:44.57	

=== Final ===
Rank	Athlete	Time	Notes
1st place, gold medalist(s)	Sun Yang (CHN)	1:45.43	
2nd place, silver medalist(s)	Katsuhiro Matsumoto (JPN)	1:46.50	
3rd place, bronze medalist(s)	Ji Xinjie (CHN)	1:46.68	
4	Khader Baqlah (JOR)	1:46.77	
5	Naito Ehara (JPN)	1:47.66	
6	Welson Sim (MAS)	1:47.99	
7	Lee Ho-joon (KOR)	1:48.10	
8	Hoàng Quý Phước (VIE)	1:50.57	
