= Swimming at the 2010 Asian Games – Men's 4 × 200 metre freestyle relay =

Men's 4 × 200 metre freestyle relay at the 2010 Asian Games
- Venue: Aoti Aquatics Centre
- Date: 15 November 2010
- Competitors: 48 from 12 nations

Medalists
gold medal	China; Zhang Lin, Jiang Haiqi, Li Yunqi, Sun Yang, Dai Jun, Jiang Yuhui, Zhang Enjian
silver medal	Japan; Yuki Kobori, Sho Uchida, Shunsuke Kuzuhara, Takeshi Matsuda, Yoshihiro Okumura
bronze medal	South Korea; Bae Joon-mo, Jang Sang-jin, Lee Hyun-seung, Park Tae-hwan, Park Min-kyu, Kim Yong-sik

The men's 4 × 200 metre freestyle relay event at the 2010 Asian Games took place on 15 November 2010 at Guangzhou Aoti Aquatics Centre.

There were 12 teams who took part in this event. Two heats were held. The heat in which a team competed did not formally matter for advancement, as the teams with the top eight times from the both field qualified for the finals.

China won the gold medal with 7 minutes 07.68 seconds. Before this Asian games, Japan got all 15 gold medals of men's 4 x 200 metre freestyle relay. It was the first time that Japan didn't win this event in Asian games.

== Schedule ==
All times are China Standard Time (UTC+08:00)

Date	Time	Event
Monday, 15 November 2010	10:22	Heats
Monday, 15 November 2010	19:31	Final

== Records ==
Prior to this competition, the existing world, Asian and Games records were as follows.

World Record	United States	6:58.55	Rome, Italy	31 July 2009
Asian Record	Japan	7:02.26	Rome, Italy	31 July 2009
Games Record	Japan	7:14.86	Doha, Qatar	4 December 2006

== Results ==
Legend

- DNS — Did not start
- DSQ — Disqualified

=== Heats ===
Rank	Heat	Team	Time	Notes
1	2	Japan (JPN)	7:15.57	
		Yuki Kobori	1:50.80	
		Sho Uchida	1:47.47	
		Yoshihiro Okumura	1:48.68	
		Shunsuke Kuzuhara	1:48.62	
2	1	China (CHN)	7:19.30	
		Jiang Haiqi	1:48.08	
		Dai Jun	1:49.66	
		Jiang Yuhui	1:50.59	
		Zhang Enjian	1:50.97	
3	1	South Korea (KOR)	7:30.96	
		Jang Sang-jin	1:51.97	
		Park Min-kyu	1:51.33	
		Kim Yong-sik	1:51.98	
		Bae Joon-mo	1:55.68	
4	2	Singapore (SIN)	7:32.29	
		Danny Yeo	1:53.13	
		Joshua Lim	1:54.09	
		Pang Sheng Jun	1:52.32	
		Clement Lim	1:52.75	
5	1	Philippines (PHI)	7:33.52	
		Jessie Lacuna	1:52.75	
		Charles Walker	1:52.89	
		Ryan Arabejo	1:55.47	
		Miguel Molina	1:52.41	
6	2	Hong Kong (HKG)	7:35.68	
		David Wong	1:51.64	
		Derick Ng	1:53.89	
		Kent Cheung	1:53.64	
		Kong Chun Yin	1:56.51	
7	2	Kazakhstan (KAZ)	7:38.77	
		Alexandr Ivanov	1:54.65	
		Artur Dilman	1:54.07	
		Stanislav Kuzmin	1:55.05	
		Dmitriy Gordiyenko	1:55.00	
8	2	Malaysia (MAS)	7:39.54	
		Daniel Bego	1:51.26	
		Kevin Yeap	1:53.84	
		Foo Jian Beng	1:55.41	
		Kevin Lim	1:59.03	
9	1	Uzbekistan (UZB)	7:39.62	
		Petr Romashkin	1:53.92	
		Aleksey Derlyugov	1:55.11	
		Sobitjon Amilov	1:54.37	
		Danil Bugakov	1:54.22	
10	1	India (IND)	7:40.03	
		Aaron D'Souza	1:53.17	
		Mandar Divase	1:56.31	
		Rohit Halvaldar	1:55.08	
		Rehan Poncha	1:55.47	
—	1	Saudi Arabia (KSA)	DNS	
		—		
		—		
		—		
		—		
—	2	Athletes from Kuwait (IOC)	DNS	
		—		
		—		
		—		
		—		

=== Final ===
Rank	Team	Time	Notes
1st place, gold medalist(s)	China (CHN)	7:07.68	GR
	Zhang Lin	1:47.30	
	Jiang Haiqi	1:46.64	
	Li Yunqi	1:48.09	
	Sun Yang	1:45.65	
2nd place, silver medalist(s)	Japan (JPN)	7:10.39	
	Yuki Kobori	1:47.92	
	Sho Uchida	1:47.29	
	Shunsuke Kuzuhara	1:47.91	
	Takeshi Matsuda	1:47.27	
3rd place, bronze medalist(s)	South Korea (KOR)	7:24.14	
	Bae Joon-mo	1:52.83	
	Jang Sang-jin	1:50.40	
	Lee Hyun-seung	1:50.16	
	Park Tae-hwan	1:50.75	
4	Philippines (PHI)	7:30.76	
	Jessie Lacuna	1:52.21	
	Charles Walker	1:51.78	
	Ryan Arabejo	1:55.07	
	Miguel Molina	1:51.70	
5	Hong Kong (HKG)	7:31.44	
	David Wong	1:51.25	
	Derick Ng	1:52.37	
	Kent Cheung	1:52.67	
	Kong Chun Yin	1:55.15	
6	Malaysia (MAS)	7:35.66	
	Daniel Bego	1:50.31	
	Kevin Yeap	1:53.00	
	Ian James Barr	1:57.48	
	Foo Jian Beng	1:54.87	
7	Kazakhstan (KAZ)	7:37.76	
	Oleg Rabota	1:53.29	
	Alexandr Ivanov	1:53.02	
	Dmitriy Gordiyenko	1:56.96	
	Artur Dilman	1:54.49	
—	Singapore (SIN)	DSQ	
	Danny Yeo		
	Pang Sheng Jun		
	Joshua Lim		
	Clement Lim		
