= Swimming at the 2014 Asian Games – Men's 400 metre freestyle =

Men's 400 metre freestyle at the 2014 Asian Games
- Venue: Munhak Park Tae-hwan Aquatics Center
- Date: 23 September 2014
- Competitors: 23 from 15 nations

Medalists
gold medal	Sun Yang	China
silver medal	Kosuke Hagino	Japan
bronze medal	Hao Yun	China

The men's 400 metre freestyle event at the 2014 Asian Games took place on 23 September 2014 at Munhak Park Tae-hwan Aquatics Center.

== Schedule ==
All times are Korea Standard Time (UTC+09:00)

Date	Time	Event
Tuesday, 23 September 2014	09:00	Heats
Tuesday, 23 September 2014	20:16	Final

== Records ==
Prior to this competition, the existing world, Asian and Games records were as follows.

World Record	Paul Biedermann (GER)	3:40.07	Rome, Italy	26 July 2009
Asian Record	Sun Yang (CHN)	3:40.14	London, United Kingdom	28 July 2012
Games Record	Park Tae-hwan (KOR)	3:41.53	Guangzhou, China	16 November 2010

== Results ==
=== Heats ===
Rank	Heat	Athlete	Time	Notes
1	3	Sun Yang (CHN)	3:51.17	
2	2	Kosuke Hagino (JPN)	3:52.24	
3	3	Park Tae-hwan (KOR)	~~3:53.80~~	
4	2	Hao Yun (CHN)	3:54.36	
5	3	Kohei Yamamoto (JPN)	3:54.95	
6	2	Kevin Yeap (MAS)	3:56.85	
7	3	Danny Yeo (SIN)	3:57.42	
8	3	Vernon Lee (MAS)	3:58.27	
9	3	Hoàng Quý Phước (VIE)	3:58.71	
10	2	Sajan Prakash (IND)	3:59.27	
11	3	Saurabh Sangvekar (IND)	3:59.66	
12	2	Lâm Quang Nhật (VIE)	4:02.73	
13	1	Khurshidjon Tursunov (UZB)	4:02.90	
14	2	Teo Zhen Ren (SIN)	4:03.85	
15	3	Ricky Anggawijaya (INA)	4:04.81	
16	2	Kong Kei Koi (HKG)	4:07.01	
17	2	Hsu Che-yu (TPE)	4:07.96	
18	1	Ali Boabbas (KUW)	4:12.50	
19	1	Kent Cheung (HKG)	4:14.70	
20	1	Issa Al-Adawi (OMA)	4:26.11	
21	1	Ahmed Al-Hashem (KSA)	4:31.77	
22	1	Ismail Muthasim Adnan (MDV)	5:10.34	
23	1	Mubal Azzam Ibrahim (MDV)	5:29.40	

=== Final ===
Rank	Athlete	Time	Notes
1st place, gold medalist(s)	Sun Yang (CHN)	3:43.23	
2nd place, silver medalist(s)	Kosuke Hagino (JPN)	3:44.48	
3rd place, bronze medalist(s)	Hao Yun (CHN)	3:50.38	
4	Kohei Yamamoto (JPN)	3:51.09	
5	Danny Yeo (SIN)	3:55.39	
6	Kevin Yeap (MAS)	3:55.52	
7	Vernon Lee (MAS)	3:57.29	
DQ	Park Tae-hwan (KOR)	~~3:48.33~~	

- Park Tae-hwan of South Korea originally won the bronze medal, but was later disqualified after he tested positive for Nebido.
