= Swimming at the 2010 Asian Games – Men's 200 metre freestyle =

Men's 200 metre freestyle at the 2010 Asian Games
- Venue: Aoti Aquatics Centre
- Date: 14 November 2010
- Competitors: 29 from 17 nations

Medalists
gold medal	Park Tae-hwan	South Korea
silver medal	Sun Yang	China
bronze medal	Takeshi Matsuda	Japan

The men's 200 metre freestyle event at the 2010 Asian Games took place on 17 November 2010 at Guangzhou Aoti Aquatics Centre.

There were 29 competitors from 17 countries who took part in this event. Four heats were held, with most containing the maximum number of swimmers (eight). The heat in which a swimmer competed did not formally matter for advancement, as the swimmers with the top eight times from the entire field qualified for the finals.

Defending champion Park Tae-hwan from South Korea won the gold medal with 1 minute 44.80 seconds, which also broke the Asian record.

== Schedule ==
All times are China Standard Time (UTC+08:00)

Date	Time	Event
Sunday, 14 November 2010	09:30	Heats
Sunday, 14 November 2010	18:25	Final

== Records ==
Prior to this competition, the existing world, Asian and Games records were as follows.

World Record	Paul Biedermann (GER)	1:42.00	Rome, Italy	28 July 2009
Asian Record	Park Tae-hwan (KOR)	1:44.85	Beijing, China	12 August 2008
Games Record	Park Tae-hwan (KOR)	1:47.12	Doha, Qatar	3 December 2006

== Results ==
Legend

- DNS — Did not start

=== Heats ===
Rank	Heat	Athlete	Time	Notes
1	1	Sun Yang (CHN)	1:47.85	
2	2	Zhang Lin (CHN)	1:48.86	
3	4	Park Tae-hwan (KOR)	1:49.15	
4	4	Yuki Kobori (JPN)	1:49.61	
5	3	Takeshi Matsuda (JPN)	1:50.20	
6	3	Lee Hyun-seung (KOR)	1:50.45	
7	4	Danny Yeo (SIN)	1:51.70	
8	2	Clement Lim (SIN)	1:51.91	
9	2	Oleg Rabota (KAZ)	1:52.60	
10	2	Sarit Tiewong (THA)	1:53.33	
11	4	Petr Romashkin (UZB)	1:53.42	
12	4	Jessie Lacuna (PHI)	1:53.50	
13	3	Aaron D'Souza (IND)	1:53.93	
14	2	Sobitjon Amilov (UZB)	1:54.02	
15	4	Triady Fauzi Sidiq (INA)	1:54.51	
16	3	Abdullah Al-Thuwaini (IOC)	1:54.72	
17	3	Alexandr Ivanov (KAZ)	1:54.98	
18	3	Kent Cheung (HKG)	1:55.03	
19	2	Saeid Maleka Ashtiani (IRI)	1:55.04	
20	1	Rohit Halvaldar (IND)	1:55.48	
21	3	Kong Chun Yin (HKG)	1:56.51	
22	4	Loai Tashkandi (KSA)	1:57.67	
23	1	Antonio Tong (MAC)	1:58.05	
24	4	Punyawee Sontana (THA)	1:58.73	
25	3	Mohammad Madwa (IOC)	1:58.92	
26	2	Hazem Tashkandi (KSA)	2:03.90	
27	1	Abdulrahman Al-Ollan (QAT)	2:06.64	
28	1	Hussain Al-Lanjawi (QAT)	2:23.84	
—	2	Rami Anis (SYR)	DNS	

=== Final ===
Rank	Athlete	Time	Notes
1st place, gold medalist(s)	Park Tae-hwan (KOR)	1:44.80	AR
2nd place, silver medalist(s)	Sun Yang (CHN)	1:46.25	
3rd place, bronze medalist(s)	Takeshi Matsuda (JPN)	1:47.73	
4	Zhang Lin (CHN)	1:48.10	
5	Yuki Kobori (JPN)	1:48.15	
6	Lee Hyun-seung (KOR)	1:50.42	
7	Danny Yeo (SIN)	1:51.07	
8	Clement Lim (SIN)	1:52.25	
