= Swimming at the 2014 Asian Games – Men's 200 metre freestyle =

Men's 200 metre freestyle at the 2014 Asian Games
- Venue: Munhak Park Tae-hwan Aquatics Center
- Date: 21 September 2014
- Competitors: 26 from 19 nations

Medalists
gold medal	Kosuke Hagino	Japan
silver medal	Sun Yang	China
bronze medal	Li Yunqi	China

The men's 200 metre freestyle event at the 2014 Asian Games took place on 21 September 2014 at Munhak Park Tae-hwan Aquatics Center.

== Schedule ==
All times are Korea Standard Time (UTC+09:00)

Date	Time	Event
Sunday, 21 September 2014	09:00	Heats
Sunday, 21 September 2014	19:00	Final

== Records ==
Prior to this competition, the existing world, Asian and Games records were as follows.

World Record	Paul Biedermann (GER)	1:42.00	Rome, Italy	28 July 2009
Asian Record	Sun Yang (CHN)	1:44.47	Shenyang, China	6 September 2013
Games Record	Park Tae-hwan (KOR)	1:44.80	Guangzhou, China	14 November 2010

== Results ==
Legend

- DNS — Did not start

=== Heats ===
Rank	Heat	Athlete	Time	Notes
1	4	Sun Yang (CHN)	1:48.90	
2	2	Kosuke Hagino (JPN)	1:48.99	
3	4	Takeshi Matsuda (JPN)	1:50.20	
4	3	Park Tae-hwan (KOR)	~~1:50.29~~	
5	3	Li Yunqi (CHN)	1:50.43	
6	3	Danny Yeo (SIN)	1:50.91	
7	4	Hoàng Quý Phước (VIE)	1:51.00	
8	4	Huang Yen-hsin (TPE)	1:51.08	
9	3	Khurshidjon Tursunov (UZB)	1:52.03	
10	2	Wang Yu-lian (TPE)	1:52.13	
11	3	Pang Sheng Jun (SIN)	1:52.42	
12	2	Welson Sim (MAS)	1:52.47	
13	3	Kent Cheung (HKG)	1:52.72	
14	2	Aleksey Derlyugov (UZB)	1:52.80	
15	1	Jessie Lacuna (PHI)	1:53.20	
16	4	Saurabh Sangvekar (IND)	1:53.33	
17	4	David Wong (HKG)	1:54.45	
18	2	Ricky Anggawijaya (INA)	1:57.39	
19	2	Issa Al-Adawi (OMA)	2:02.67	
20	3	Ahmed Al-Hashem (KSA)	2:04.62	
21	4	Ali Boabbas (KUW)	2:04.80	
22	2	Myagmaryn Delgerkhüü (MGL)	2:05.52	
23	3	Sirish Gurung (NEP)	2:10.23	
24	1	Ismail Muthasim Adnan (MDV)	2:24.10	
25	1	Mohamed Muthasim Adnan (MDV)	2:24.17	
—	4	Nisar Ahmed (PAK)	DNS	

=== Final ===
Rank	Athlete	Time	Notes
1st place, gold medalist(s)	Kosuke Hagino (JPN)	1:45.23	
2nd place, silver medalist(s)	Sun Yang (CHN)	1:45.28	
3rd place, bronze medalist(s)	Li Yunqi (CHN)	1:49.25	
4	Takeshi Matsuda (JPN)	1:49.64	
5	Danny Yeo (SIN)	1:49.90	
6	Hoàng Quý Phước (VIE)	1:50.42	
7	Huang Yen-hsin (TPE)	1:51.08	
DQ	Park Tae-hwan (KOR)	~~1:45.85~~	

- Park Tae-hwan of South Korea originally won the bronze medal, but was later disqualified after he tested positive for Nebido.
