= Swimming at the 2017 World Aquatics Championships – Men's 200 metre freestyle =

Men's 200 metre freestyle at the 2017 World Aquatics Championships
- Venue: Danube Arena
- Location: Budapest, Hungary
- Dates: 24 July (heats and semifinals); 25 July (final)
- Competitors: 73 from 63 nations
- Winning time: 1:44.39

Medalists
gold medal	Sun Yang	China
silver medal	Townley Haas	United States
bronze medal	Aleksandr Krasnykh	Russia

The Men's 200 metre freestyle competition at the 2017 World Championships was held on 24 and 25 July 2017.

== Records ==
Prior to the competition, the existing world and championship records were as follows.

World record	Paul Biedermann (GER)	1:42.00	Rome, Italy	28 July 2009
Competition record	Paul Biedermann (GER)	1:42.00	Rome, Italy	28 July 2009

== Results ==
=== Heats ===
The heats were held on 24 July at 10:18.

Rank	Heat	Lane	Name	Nationality	Time	Notes
1	8	4	Sun Yang	China	1:45.78	Q
2	8	5	James Guy	Great Britain	1:46.22	Q
3	7	7	Mikhail Dovgalyuk	Russia	1:46.47	Q
4	7	4	Townley Haas	United States	1:46.50	Q
5	6	5	Aleksandr Krasnykh	Russia	1:46.51	Q
6	8	6	Kacper Majchrzak	Poland	1:46.58	Q
7	8	3	Duncan Scott	Great Britain	1:46.62	Q
8	7	2	Dominik Kozma	Hungary	1:46.83	Q
9	7	6	Blake Pieroni	United States	1:46.88	Q
10	6	1	Danas Rapšys	Lithuania	1:46.93	Q, NR
11	6	2	Mack Horton	Australia	1:46.97	Q
12	7	3	Velimir Stjepanović	Serbia	1:47.05	Q
13	6	6	Myles Brown	South Africa	1:47.09	Q
14	6	4	Park Tae-hwan	South Korea	1:47.11	Q
15	8	7	Naito Ehara	Japan	1:47.31	Q
16	5	4	Marwan El-Kamash	Egypt	1:47.40	Q, NR
16	6	8	Felix Auböck	Austria	1:47.40	
18	6	7	Jan Świtkowski	Poland	1:47.42	
19	5	1	Khader Baqlah	Jordan	1:47.68	NR
20	5	6	Clemens Rapp	Germany	1:47.69	
21	5	7	Kyle Stolk	Netherlands	1:47.71	
22	6	3	Jérémy Stravius	France	1:47.72	
23	8	1	Matias Koski	Finland	1:47.75	
24	5	8	Dylan Carter	Trinidad and Tobago	1:47.77	NR
25	6	9	Péter Bernek	Hungary	1:47.79	
26	6	0	Federico Grabich	Argentina	1:47.89	
27	5	5	Katsuhiro Matsumoto	Japan	1:47.92	
28	7	0	Filippo Megli	Italy	1:47.94	
29	8	0	Matthew Stanley	New Zealand	1:48.02	
30	4	2	Nils Liess	Switzerland	1:48.07	
31	8	8	Pieter Timmers	Belgium	1:48.13	
32	5	3	Anders Lie	Denmark	1:48.14	
33	7	1	Cristian Quintero	Venezuela	1:48.22	
34	7	8	Poul Zellmann	Germany	1:48.67	
34	8	9	Alexander Graham	Australia	1:48.67	
36	4	7	Victor Johansson	Sweden	1:48.74	
37	7	9	Jordan Sloan	Ireland	1:49.17	
38	4	1	Henrik Christiansen	Norway	1:49.31	
39	3	7	Mikel Schreuders	Aruba	1:49.66	NR
40	4	8	Mokhtar Al-Yamani	Yemen	1:49.87	NR
40	5	9	Hoàng Quý Phước	Vietnam	1:49.87	
42	8	2	Wang Shun	China	1:49.89	
43	3	5	Michael Gunning	Jamaica	1:50.00	NR
44	5	2	Markus Thormeyer	Canada	1:50.23	
45	4	6	Mohamed Lagili	Tunisia	1:50.33	
46	4	5	Miguel Durán	Spain	1:50.34	
47	4	4	Dimitrios Dimitriou	Greece	1:50.40	
48	4	9	Marcelo Acosta	El Salvador	1:50.92	
49	3	4	Kregor Zirk	Estonia	1:51.08	
50	4	3	Khurshidjon Tursunov	Uzbekistan	1:51.13	
51	3	3	Pit Brandenburger	Luxembourg	1:51.14	
52	3	1	Igor Mogne	Mozambique	1:51.48	NR
53	3	2	Wesley Roberts	Cook Islands	1:51.67	NR
54	5	0	Tomer Frankel	Israel	1:51.80	
55	4	0	An Ting-yao	Chinese Taipei	1:52.09	
56	3	8	Alex Sobers	Barbados	1:52.50	
57	2	2	Mathieu Marquet	Mauritius	1:53.18	NR
58	3	6	Kent Cheung	Hong Kong	1:54.58	
59	2	5	Sam Seghers	Papua New Guinea	1:54.87	
60	2	4	Xander Skinner	Namibia	1:54.99	NR
61	2	6	Lin Sizhuang	Macau	1:55.12	NR
62	3	0	Noah Mascoll-Gomes	Antigua and Barbuda	1:55.32	
63	2	3	Matthew Lowe	Bahamas	1:55.71	
64	3	9	Irakli Revishvili	Georgia	1:56.51	
65	1	6	Klavio Meça	Albania	1:57.23	
66	1	4	Yacob Al-Khulaifi	Qatar	1:58.32	NR
67	2	8	Heriniavo Rasolonjatovo	Madagascar	2:01.00	NR
68	2	1	Duran Alfonso	Honduras	2:01.07	
68	2	7	Ado Gargović	Montenegro	2:01.07	
70	1	5	Dean Hoffman	Seychelles	2:02.62	
71	2	9	Noel Keane	Palau	2:06.03	NR
72	2	0	Tanner Poppe	Guam	2:11.27	
73	1	3	Tongli Panuve	Tonga	2:12.61	NR
	1	2	Rashed Al-Tarmoom	Suspended Member Federation	DNS	
	7	5	Chad le Clos	South Africa	DNS	

=== Semifinals ===
The semifinals were held on 24 July at 18:42.

==== Semifinal 1 ====
Rank	Lane	Name	Nationality	Time	Notes
1	4	James Guy	Great Britain	1:45.18	Q
2	5	Townley Haas	United States	1:45.43	Q
3	6	Dominik Kozma	Hungary	1:45.87	Q
4	1	Park Tae-hwan	South Korea	1:46.28	Q
5	3	Kacper Majchrzak	Poland	1:46.40	
6	2	Danas Rapšys	Lithuania	1:46.56	NR
7	7	Velimir Stjepanović	Serbia	1:46.82	
8	8	Marwan El-Kamash	Egypt	1:47.41	

==== Semifinal 2 ====
Rank	Lane	Name	Nationality	Time	Notes
1	6	Duncan Scott	Great Britain	1:45.16	Q
2	4	Sun Yang	China	1:45.24	Q
3	3	Aleksandr Krasnykh	Russia	1:45.47	Q
4	5	Mikhail Dovgalyuk	Russia	1:45.74	Q
5	7	Mack Horton	Australia	1:46.81	
6	2	Blake Pieroni	United States	1:47.08	
7	1	Myles Brown	South Africa	1:47.19	
8	8	Naito Ehara	Japan	1:47.36	

=== Final ===
The final was held on 25 July at 17:32.

Rank	Lane	Name	Nationality	Time	Notes
1st place, gold medalist(s)	3	Sun Yang	China	1:44.39	AS
2nd place, silver medalist(s)	6	Townley Haas	United States	1:45.04	
3rd place, bronze medalist(s)	2	Aleksandr Krasnykh	Russia	1:45.23	
4	4	Duncan Scott	Great Britain	1:45.27	
5	5	James Guy	Great Britain	1:45.36	
6	1	Dominik Kozma	Hungary	1:45.54	NR
7	7	Mikhail Dovgalyuk	Russia	1:46.02	
8	8	Park Tae-hwan	South Korea	1:47.11	
