= Swimming at the 2018 Asian Games – Men's 4 × 100 metre freestyle relay =

Men's 4 × 100 metre freestyle relay at the 2018 Asian Games
- Venue: Gelora Bung Karno Aquatic Stadium
- Date: 22 August 2018
- Competitors: 76 from 18 nations

Medalists
gold medal	Japan; Shinri Shioura, Katsuhiro Matsumoto, Katsumi Nakamura, Juran Mizohata
silver medal	China; Yang Jintong, Cao Jiwen, Sun Yang, Yu Hexin, Hou Yujie, Qian Zhiyong, Ma Tianchi, Ji Xinjie
bronze medal	Singapore; Quah Zheng Wen, Joseph Schooling, Darren Chua, Darren Lim, Danny Yeo, Jonathan Tan

The men's 4 × 100 metre freestyle relay event at the 2018 Asian Games took place on 22 August at the Gelora Bung Karno Aquatic Stadium.

== Schedule ==
All times are Western Indonesia Time (UTC+07:00)

Date	Time	Event
Wednesday, 22 August 2018	10:16	Heats
Wednesday, 22 August 2018	19:31	Final

== Records ==
Prior to this competition, the existing world, Asian and Games records were as follows.

World Record	United States	3:08.24	Beijing, China	11 August 2008
Asian Record	Japan	3:12.54	Tokyo, Japan	11 August 2018
Games Record	China	3:13.47	Incheon, South Korea	24 September 2014

== Results ==
Legend

- DNS — Did not start
- DSQ — Disqualified

=== Heats ===
Rank	Heat	Team	Time	Notes
1	3	China (CHN)	3:17.30	
		Hou Yujie	49.20	
		Qian Zhiyong	49.38	
		Ma Tianchi	49.30	
		Ji Xinjie	49.42	
2	2	Japan (JPN)	3:18.25	
		Shinri Shioura	49.30	
		Katsuhiro Matsumoto	49.28	
		Katsumi Nakamura	49.03	
		Juran Mizohata	50.64	
3	2	Singapore (SGP)	3:20.16	
		Darren Lim	50.28	
		Danny Yeo	50.29	
		Darren Chua	49.35	
		Jonathan Tan	50.24	
4	2	South Korea (KOR)	3:21.16	
		Jang Dong-hyeok	49.95	
		Yang Jae-hoon	49.06	
		Park Jung-hun	50.77	
		Lee Ju-ho	51.38	
5	3	Chinese Taipei (TPE)	3:21.93	
		Lin Chien-liang	50.31	
		Huang Yen-hsin	50.52	
		An Ting-yao	50.39	
		Wang Yu-lian	50.71	
6	3	Malaysia (MAS)	3:22.89	
		Keith Lim	50.99	
		Welson Sim	49.92	
		Chan Jie	50.86	
		Foong Wei Tze	51.12	
7	2	Indonesia (INA)	3:25.14	
		Triady Fauzi Sidiq	50.26	
		Ricky Anggawijaya	51.65	
		Putera Muhammad Randa	52.43	
		Raymond Sumitra Lukman	50.80	
8	1	India (IND)	3:25.17	
		Aaron D'Souza	51.16	
		Anshul Kothari	51.43	
		Sajan Prakash	51.92	
		Virdhawal Khade	50.66	
9	3	Hong Kong (HKG)	3:25.50	
		Kent Cheung	51.89	
		Derick Ng	50.98	
		Raymond Mak	51.34	
		Jeremy Wong	51.29	
10	3	Iran (IRI)	3:26.12	
		Sina Gholampour	51.25	
		Benyamin Gharehhassanloo	51.51	
		Alireza Yavari	51.25	
		Mehdi Ansari	52.11	
11	2	Uzbekistan (UZB)	3:27.15	
		Aleksey Tarasenko	50.41	
		Khurshidjon Tursunov	49.21	
		Vladislav Mustafin	55.70	
		Artyom Kozlyuk	51.83	
12	2	Macau (MAC)	3:29.97	
		Chao Man Hou	51.60	
		Ngou Pok Man	51.52	
		Lin Sizhuang	52.69	
		Chou Kit	54.16	
13	1	Qatar (QAT)	3:44.36	
		Firas Saidi	54.01	
		Abdulaziz Al-Obaidly	56.00	
		Youssef Hesham Mohamed	58.75	
		Yacob Al-Khulaifi	55.60	
14	1	Mongolia (MGL)	3:44.82	
		Batmönkhiin Jürmed	56.66	
		Erdenemönkhiin Demüül	58.25	
		Boldbaataryn Buyantogtokh	54.69	
		Günsennorovyn Zandanbal	55.22	
15	3	Pakistan (PAK)	3:59.48	
		Haseeb Tariq	53.58	
		Kawas Behram Aga	58.83	
		Muhammad Hamza Malik	1:10.90	
		Muhammad Yahya Khan	56.17	
16	3	Maldives (MDV)	4:10.12	
		Ali Imaan	1:02.28	
		Hassan Ashraf	1:03.28	
		Hussain Haish Hassan	1:03.51	
		Mubal Azzam Ibrahim	1:01.05	
—	2	Sri Lanka (SRI)	DSQ	
		Matthew Abeysinghe	49.16	
		Kyle Abeysinghe		
		Cherantha de Silva		
		Akalanka Peiris		
—	3	Tajikistan (TJK)	DNS	
		—		
		—		
		—		
		—		

=== Final ===
Rank	Team	Time	Notes
1st place, gold medalist(s)	Japan (JPN)	3:12.68	GR
	Shinri Shioura	48.85	
	Katsuhiro Matsumoto	47.65	
	Katsumi Nakamura	48.08	
	Juran Mizohata	48.10	
2nd place, silver medalist(s)	China (CHN)	3:13.29	
	Yang Jintong	49.24	
	Cao Jiwen	48.29	
	Sun Yang	48.38	
	Yu Hexin	47.38	
3rd place, bronze medalist(s)	Singapore (SGP)	3:17.22	
	Quah Zheng Wen	49.64	
	Joseph Schooling	48.27	
	Darren Chua	49.64	
	Darren Lim	49.67	
4	South Korea (KOR)	3:17.92	
	Yang Jae-hoon	49.61	
	Jang Dong-hyeok	49.36	
	Lee Ho-joon	49.61	
	Park Seon-kwan	49.34	
5	Chinese Taipei (TPE)	3:19.02	
	Lin Chien-liang	49.85	
	Huang Yen-hsin	50.24	
	An Ting-yao	49.18	
	Wang Yu-lian	49.75	
6	Malaysia (MAS)	3:21.06	
	Keith Lim	50.71	
	Welson Sim	49.42	
	Chan Jie	50.27	
	Foong Wei Tze	50.66	
7	Indonesia (INA)	3:25.16	
	Triady Fauzi Sidiq	50.05	
	Ricky Anggawijaya	51.26	
	Putera Muhammad Randa	52.58	
	Raymond Sumitra Lukman	51.27	
8	India (IND)	3:25.34	
	Aaron D'Souza	51.46	
	Anshul Kothari	51.61	
	Sajan Prakash	51.45	
	Virdhawal Khade	50.82	
