= Swimming at the 2014 Asian Games – Men's 1500 metre freestyle =

Men's 1500 metre freestyle at the 2014 Asian Games
- Venue: Munhak Park Tae-hwan Aquatics Center
- Date: 26 September 2014
- Competitors: 14 from 9 nations

Medalists
gold medal	Sun Yang	China
silver medal	Kohei Yamamoto	Japan
bronze medal	Wang Kecheng	China

The men's 1500 metre freestyle event at the 2014 Asian Games took place on 26 September 2014 at Munhak Park Tae-hwan Aquatics Center.

== Schedule ==
All times are Korea Standard Time (UTC+09:00)

Date	Time	Event
Friday, 26 September 2014	09:00	Slowest heat
Friday, 26 September 2014	19:41	Fastest heat

== Records ==
Prior to this competition, the existing world, Asian and Games records were as follows.

World Record	Sun Yang (CHN)	14:31.02	London, United Kingdom	4 August 2012
Asian Record	Sun Yang (CHN)	14:31.02	London, United Kingdom	4 August 2012
Games Record	Sun Yang (CHN)	14:35.43	Guangzhou, China	18 November 2010

== Results ==
Rank	Heat	Athlete	Time	Notes
1st place, gold medalist(s)	2	Sun Yang (CHN)	14:49.75	
2nd place, silver medalist(s)	2	Kohei Yamamoto (JPN)	14:54.86	
3rd place, bronze medalist(s)	2	Wang Kecheng (CHN)	15:06.73	
4	2	Shogo Takeda (JPN)	15:18.46	
5	2	Kevin Yeap (MAS)	15:31.67	
6	2	Lâm Quang Nhật (VIE)	15:33.21	
7	2	Park Seok-hyun (KOR)	15:36.52	
8	1	Cho Cheng-chi (TPE)	15:40.54	
9	1	Welson Sim (MAS)	15:43.04	
10	1	Huang Guo-ting (TPE)	15:50.30	
11	1	Teo Zhen Ren (SIN)	16:08.75	
12	1	Saurabh Sangvekar (IND)	16:23.46	
13	1	Ali Boabbas (KUW)	16:31.80	
DQ	2	Park Tae-hwan (KOR)	~~15:12.15~~	

- Park Tae-hwan of South Korea originally finished 4th, but was later disqualified after he tested positive for Nebido.
