= Swimming at the 2018 Asian Games – Men's 4 × 200 metre freestyle relay =

Men's 4 × 200 metre freestyle relay at the 2018 Asian Games
- Venue: Gelora Bung Karno Aquatic Stadium
- Date: 20 August 2018
- Competitors: 52 from 11 nations

Medalists
gold medal	Japan; Naito Ehara, Reo Sakata, Kosuke Hagino, Katsuhiro Matsumoto, Juran Mizohata, Ayatsugu Hirai, Yuki Kobori
silver medal	China; Ji Xinjie, Shang Keyuan, Wang Shun, Sun Yang, Qiu Ziao, Hong Jinlong, Hou Yujie, Qian Zhiyong
bronze medal	Singapore; Quah Zheng Wen, Joseph Schooling, Danny Yeo, Jonathan Tan, Darren Chua, Glen Lim

The men's 4 × 200 metre freestyle relay event at the 2018 Asian Games took place on 20 August at the Gelora Bung Karno Aquatic Stadium.

== Schedule ==
All times are Western Indonesia Time (UTC+07:00)

Date	Time	Event
Monday, 20 August 2018	10:13	Heats
Monday, 20 August 2018	19:33	Final

== Records ==
Prior to this competition, the existing world, Asian and Games records were as follows.

World Record	United States	6:58.55	Rome, Italy	31 July 2009
Asian Record	Japan	7:02.26	Rome, Italy	31 July 2009
Games Record	Japan	7:06.74	Incheon, South Korea	22 September 2014

== Results ==
Legend

- DNS — Did not start
- DSQ — Disqualified

=== Heats ===
Rank	Heat	Team	Time	Notes
1	1	China (CHN)	7:20.80	
		Qiu Ziao	1:51.93	
		Hong Jinlong	1:49.83	
		Hou Yujie	1:50.76	
		Qian Zhiyong	1:48.28	
2	2	South Korea (KOR)	7:24.32	
		Jang Dong-hyeok	1:50.41	
		Park Jung-hun	1:51.74	
		Joo Jae-gu	1:53.12	
		Yang Jae-hoon	1:49.05	
3	1	Singapore (SGP)	7:25.62	
		Danny Yeo	1:50.73	
		Jonathan Tan	1:50.64	
		Darren Chua	1:51.44	
		Glen Lim	1:52.81	
4	2	Japan (JPN)	7:25.73	
		Reo Sakata	1:50.27	
		Juran Mizohata	1:51.74	
		Ayatsugu Hirai	1:53.60	
		Yuki Kobori	1:50.12	
5	1	Vietnam (VIE)	7:30.37	
		Hoàng Quý Phước	1:50.75	
		Ngô Đình Chuyền	1:53.17	
		Nguyễn Hữu Kim Sơn	1:53.05	
		Nguyễn Huy Hoàng	1:53.40	
6	2	Chinese Taipei (TPE)	7:31.61	
		An Ting-yao	1:51.04	
		Huang Yen-hsin	1:53.90	
		Wang Yu-lian	1:51.68	
		Wang Hsing-hao	1:54.99	
7	1	India (IND)	7:34.69	
		Sajan Prakash	1:52.99	
		Srihari Nataraj	1:52.91	
		Saurabh Sangvekar	1:53.85	
		Avinash Mani	1:54.94	
8	2	Hong Kong (HKG)	7:43.57	
		Cheuk Ming Ho	1:52.13	
		Jonathan Liao	1:55.30	
		Chan Chun Hei	1:55.90	
		Kent Cheung	2:00.24	
9	1	Macau (MAC)	7:51.00	
		Lin Sizhuang	1:55.29	
		Ngou Pok Man	1:58.20	
		Chao Man Hou	1:56.10	
		Chou Kit	2:01.41	
10	2	Qatar (QAT)	8:22.53	
		Yacob Al-Khulaifi	2:07.52	
		Firas Saidi	2:02.15	
		Abdulaziz Al-Obaidly	2:04.21	
		Youssef Hesham Mohamed	2:08.65	
—	2	Indonesia (INA)	DNS	
		—		
		—		
		—		
		—		

=== Final ===
Rank	Team	Time	Notes
1st place, gold medalist(s)	Japan (JPN)	7:05.17	GR
	Naito Ehara	1:47.31	
	Reo Sakata	1:46.51	
	Kosuke Hagino	1:46.50	
	Katsuhiro Matsumoto	1:44.85	
2nd place, silver medalist(s)	China (CHN)	7:05.45	
	Ji Xinjie	1:47.58	
	Shang Keyuan	1:47.15	
	Wang Shun	1:46.53	
	Sun Yang	1:44.19	
3rd place, bronze medalist(s)	Singapore (SGP)	7:14.15	
	Quah Zheng Wen	1:48.31	
	Joseph Schooling	1:46.66	
	Danny Yeo	1:49.23	
	Jonathan Tan	1:49.95	
4	South Korea (KOR)	7:15.26	
	Yang Jae-hoon	1:49.09	
	Jang Dong-hyeok	1:48.42	
	Kim Min-suk	1:50.83	
	Lee Ho-joon	1:46.92	
5	Chinese Taipei (TPE)	7:24.48	
	Wang Yu-lian	1:51.39	
	Huang Yen-hsin	1:51.95	
	Wang Hsing-hao	1:49.99	
	An Ting-yao	1:51.15	
6	Vietnam (VIE)	7:32.02	
	Hoàng Quý Phước	1:49.21	
	Ngô Đình Chuyền	1:53.58	
	Nguyễn Hữu Kim Sơn	1:51.03	
	Nguyễn Huy Hoàng	1:58.20	
7	India (IND)	7:37.07	
	Srihari Nataraj	1:52.14	
	Saurabh Sangvekar	1:55.23	
	Avinash Mani	1:55.96	
	Neel Roy	1:53.74	
—	Hong Kong (HKG)	DSQ	
	Cheuk Ming Ho	1:52.14	
	Jonathan Liao		
	Chan Chun Hei		
	Kent Cheung		
