= Sun Yang =

Chinese swimmer (born 1991)

Sun Yang 孙杨
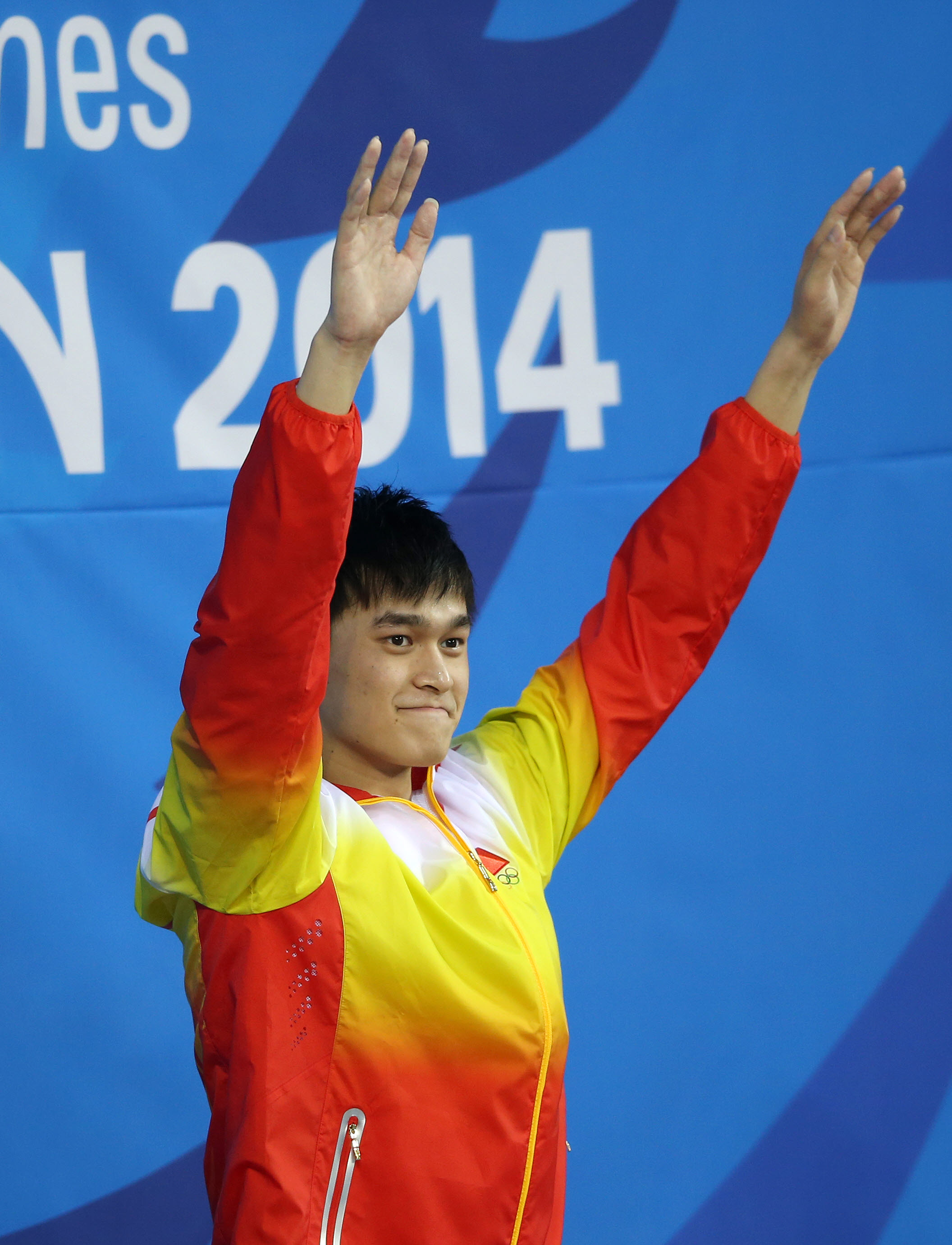
- Sun at the 2014 Asian Games

Personal information
- Nicknames: Underwater Meteor; Sun Mengmeng (孙萌萌); Da Bai (大白)
- National team: China
- Born: 1 December 1991 (age 34) Hangzhou, Zhejiang, China
- Height: 1.98 m (6 ft 6 in)
- Weight: 89 kg (196 lb)

Chinese name
- Simplified Chinese: 孙杨
- Traditional Chinese: 孫楊
Transcriptions
Standard Mandarin
- Hanyu Pinyin: Sūn Yáng
- IPA: [swə́n.jǎŋ]

Sport
- Sport: Swimming
- Strokes: Freestyle
- Club: Zhejiang Swimming Team
Medal record
Men's swimming
Representing China
Event	1st	2nd	3rd
Olympic Games	3	2	1
World Championships (LC)	11	2	3
World Championships (SC)	0	0	1
Asian Swimming Championships	8	0	0
Asian Games	9	5	0
Total	31	9	5
Olympic Games
Gold medal – first place	2012 London	400 m freestyle
Gold medal – first place	2012 London	1500 m freestyle
Gold medal – first place	2016 Rio de Janeiro	200 m freestyle
Silver medal – second place	2012 London	200 m freestyle
Silver medal – second place	2016 Rio de Janeiro	400 m freestyle
Bronze medal – third place	2012 London	4×200 m freestyle
World Championships (LC)
Gold medal – first place	2011 Shanghai	800 m freestyle
Gold medal – first place	2011 Shanghai	1500 m freestyle
Gold medal – first place	2013 Barcelona	400 m freestyle
Gold medal – first place	2013 Barcelona	800 m freestyle
Gold medal – first place	2013 Barcelona	1500 m freestyle
Gold medal – first place	2015 Kazan	400 m freestyle
Gold medal – first place	2015 Kazan	800 m freestyle
Gold medal – first place	2017 Budapest	200 m freestyle
Gold medal – first place	2017 Budapest	400 m freestyle
Gold medal – first place	2019 Gwangju	200 m freestyle
Gold medal – first place	2019 Gwangju	400 m freestyle
Silver medal – second place	2011 Shanghai	400 m freestyle
Silver medal – second place	2015 Kazan	200 m freestyle
Bronze medal – third place	2009 Rome	1500 m freestyle
Bronze medal – third place	2011 Shanghai	4×200 m freestyle
Bronze medal – third place	2013 Barcelona	4×200 m freestyle
World Championships (SC)
Bronze medal – third place	2018 Hangzhou	4×200 m freestyle
Asian Games
Gold medal – first place	2010 Guangzhou	1500 m freestyle
Gold medal – first place	2010 Guangzhou	4×200 m freestyle
Gold medal – first place	2014 Incheon	1500 m freestyle
Gold medal – first place	2014 Incheon	400 m freestyle
Gold medal – first place	2014 Incheon	4×100 m freestyle
Gold medal – first place	2018 Jakarta-Palembang	200 m freestyle
Gold medal – first place	2018 Jakarta-Palembang	400 m freestyle
Gold medal – first place	2018 Jakarta-Palembang	800 m freestyle
Gold medal – first place	2018 Jakarta-Palembang	1500 m freestyle
Silver medal – second place	2010 Guangzhou	200 m freestyle
Silver medal – second place	2010 Guangzhou	400 m freestyle
Silver medal – second place	2014 Incheon	200 m freestyle
Silver medal – second place	2018 Jakarta-Palembang	4×100 m freestyle
Silver medal – second place	2018 Jakarta-Palembang	4×200 m freestyle

Sun Yang (Chinese: 孙杨; Mandarin pronunciation: [swə́n.jǎŋ]; born 1 December 1991) is a Chinese Olympic and former world-record-holding competitive swimmer. In 2012, Sun became the first Chinese athlete to win an Olympic gold medal in men's swimming. Sun is the first male swimmer in history to earn Olympic and World Championship gold medals at every freestyle distance from 200 to 1500 metres. A three-time Olympic gold medalist and eleven-time world champion, he is the most decorated Chinese swimmer in history. In 2017, NBC Sports described him as "very arguably the greatest freestyle swimmer of all time".

In September 2018, Sun was involved in a controversial incident during an out-of-competition doping test at his home. The doping control assistant (DCA) lacked proper accreditation and took photos of Sun without his permission, leading him to refuse the blood sample collection. A security guard broke open the container to prevent the testers from taking the vials. The DCA later admitted to unprofessional conduct. FINA ruled that Sun did not violate anti-doping rules due to the DCA's actions.

On 28 February 2020, the Court of Arbitration for Sport (CAS) overturned FINA's decision, banning Sun for eight years for tampering with the doping control process. Some analysts opined that the trial was marred by severe translation problems, conflict of interest, bias and an "absence of evidence" around doping activity. CAS also ruled that Sun would not be stripped of any of his medals, noting that doping tests conducted shortly before and after the aborted doping control in September 2018 returned negative results. CAS stated that "in the absence of any evidence that the Athlete may have engaged in doping activity since 4 September 2018, including on the occasion of the FINA World Championships in Gwangju, South Korea in July 2019, the results achieved by the Athlete in the period prior to the CAS award being issued should not be disqualified." On 22 June 2021, after a retrial, CAS upheld the ban but reduced it to four years and three months due to issues related to lack of impartiality in the prior trial.

== Early life ==
Sun was born on 1 December 1991 in Hangzhou, Zhejiang, China. He was named after his parents' surnames. Sun is an only child, and his family is athletic. His father, Sun Quanhong (孙全洪), was a basketball player for Anhui Tigong. His mother, Yang Ming (杨明), was a volleyball player for Zhejiang and is a sports coach. Sun started swimming in 1998, and his potential was recognised by a teacher at Jinglun Sports School in Hangzhou.

== Career ==
=== 2007–2011: Early career ===
Sun made his international debut at the 2007 World Championships in Melbourne, Australia. He finished 32nd in the 400 metre freestyle and 23rd in the 800 metre freestyle. In early 2008, he competed at the "Good Luck Beijing" China Open, a test event for the 2008 Summer Olympics. He finished 2nd in the 400 metre freestyle with a time of 3:49.34. At the Olympics, Sun, aged 16, finished 28th in the 400 metre freestyle, unable to reach the final. He later came 7th in the qualifying heats of the 1500 metre freestyle, reaching the final, where he finished last. Sun rebounded the following year at the 2009 World Championships, where he won his first international medal, a bronze, in the 1500 metre freestyle with a time of 14:46.84. He finished 18th in the 400 metre freestyle with a time of 3:47.51.

Sun achieved further success during the 2010 Asian Games. He won gold medals in the 1500 metre freestyle and the 4 × 200 metre freestyle relay, and silver medals in the 200 metre and 400 metre freestyle. His 1500-metre freestyle time of 14:35.43 was a new Asian record and the second-fastest time in history, behind Grant Hackett, whose record Sun would surpass the following year. Sun was subsequently named Rookie of the Year at the 2010 China Central Television (CCTV) Sports Awards.

On the first day of competition at the 2011 World Championships in Shanghai, Sun came 2nd in the 400 metre freestyle with a time of 3:43.24, 1.2 seconds behind South Korean Park Tae-hwan. Three days later, Sun won his first World Championship title in the 800 metre freestyle with a time of 7:38.57. After a day of rest, he swam the anchor leg in the 4 × 200 metre freestyle relay, helping the Chinese team win bronze. The last day of competition, Sun competed in the 1500 metre freestyle. He won the race with a time of 14:34.14, ten seconds ahead of the rest of the competition. At age 19, Sun beat Hackett's world record of 14:34.56, which had stood for ten years. This was the longest-held world record in swimming and the only men's swimming world record not to have been beaten during the techsuit era.

=== 2012: Breakthrough at the Olympics ===
For the 2012 Summer Olympics, Sun was considered a favourite in the 400 metre and 1500 metre freestyle, as well as a contender in the 200 metre freestyle. In his first event, the 400 metre freestyle, he won the gold medal with a time of 3:40.14, breaking the Olympic record previously held by Ian Thorpe and becoming the first Chinese male swimmer to win a gold medal at the Olympics. His time was also the third fastest in history, 0.07 seconds away from the world record, and setting a new Asian record. After a day of recuperating, Sun competed in the 200-metre freestyle. He won a silver medal in the final, tying with Park Tae-hwan with a time of 1:44.93, a new national record. The following day, Sun swam the anchor leg in the 4 × 200 metre freestyle relay to help the Chinese team win bronze, China's first Olympic medal in a men's relay event.

After the relay, Sun did not return to the pool until the last day of competition to compete in his strongest event, the 1500 metre freestyle. He had qualified for the final with the fastest time. At the initial line-up on the starting blocks, a step-down command was issued because of noise from the crowd, but instead of stepping back, Sun reacted by diving in. The officials ruled the early dive was the result of noise from the crowd and did not constitute a false start, and Sun was allowed to continue in the competition. He went on to win the race with a time of 14:31.02, breaking his own world record by over three seconds. He finished over eight seconds ahead of second-place finisher, Canadian Ryan Cochrane. With two gold medals and a team bronze medal, Sun became the most decorated Chinese male swimmer in Olympic history, and the first swimmer to win the 400/1500 double since Vladimir Salnikov at the 1980 Moscow Olympics. Sun completed the last 50 metres of the race in 25.68 seconds, nearly two seconds faster than Cochrane.

=== 2013: Continued success ===
From 28 July to 4 August 2013, Sun competed at the World Championships. On the first day of competition, he won gold in the 400 metre freestyle with a time of 3:41.59. It was nearly 1.5 seconds off his Olympic-winning time from the previous year, but he was still 3.23 seconds ahead of runner-up Kosuke Hagino. Two days later, Sun retained his title in the 800 metre freestyle with a time of 7:41.36. It was his second gold medal in the Championship and the 100th gold medal won by China in World Aquatics Championships' history.

On the sixth day of competition, Sun was tasked with swimming the anchor leg for the 4 × 200 metre freestyle relay. China barely qualified for the final in eighth place. Going into the last leg of the race, China was in fifth place, over two seconds behind France and Japan, but Sun was able to overtake both teams in the end for a final time of 1:43.16. This was the second-fastest split time in history and 1.82 seconds faster than the other 31 swimmers in the final, including Ryan Lochte and Yannick Agnel. Accounting for the relay exchange advantage, it was still over a second faster than his flat start time of 1:44.93.

On the final day of the competition, Sun successfully defended his title in the 1500 metre freestyle. He finished with a time of 14:41.15, beating runner-up Ryan Cochrane by 1.33 seconds. This result made Sun the second swimmer in history, after Grant Hackett, to win gold medals in all three long-distance freestyle events—400, 800, and 1500 metres—in a single World Championships.

One month later, Sun competed in the 2013 National Games of China. Aiming to become the first man to win seven gold medals at a single championship, he added to his range the 100 metre freestyle, an event typically reserved for sprinters. With the games holding the same schedule as the Olympics, he competed first in the 400-metre freestyle, winning in 3:43.68—over a second ahead of Hao Yun. The following day, Sun won the 4 × 100 metre freestyle relay, swimming the anchor leg in 48.14 seconds. He followed these performances the next day by setting a new Asian record in the 200-metre freestyle with a time of 1:44.47, about half a second faster than his time in London. The following day, he won bronze in the 100-metre freestyle, finishing with a time of 48.94 seconds, his first time finishing under 49 seconds.

=== 2014: Doping ban and Asian Games ===
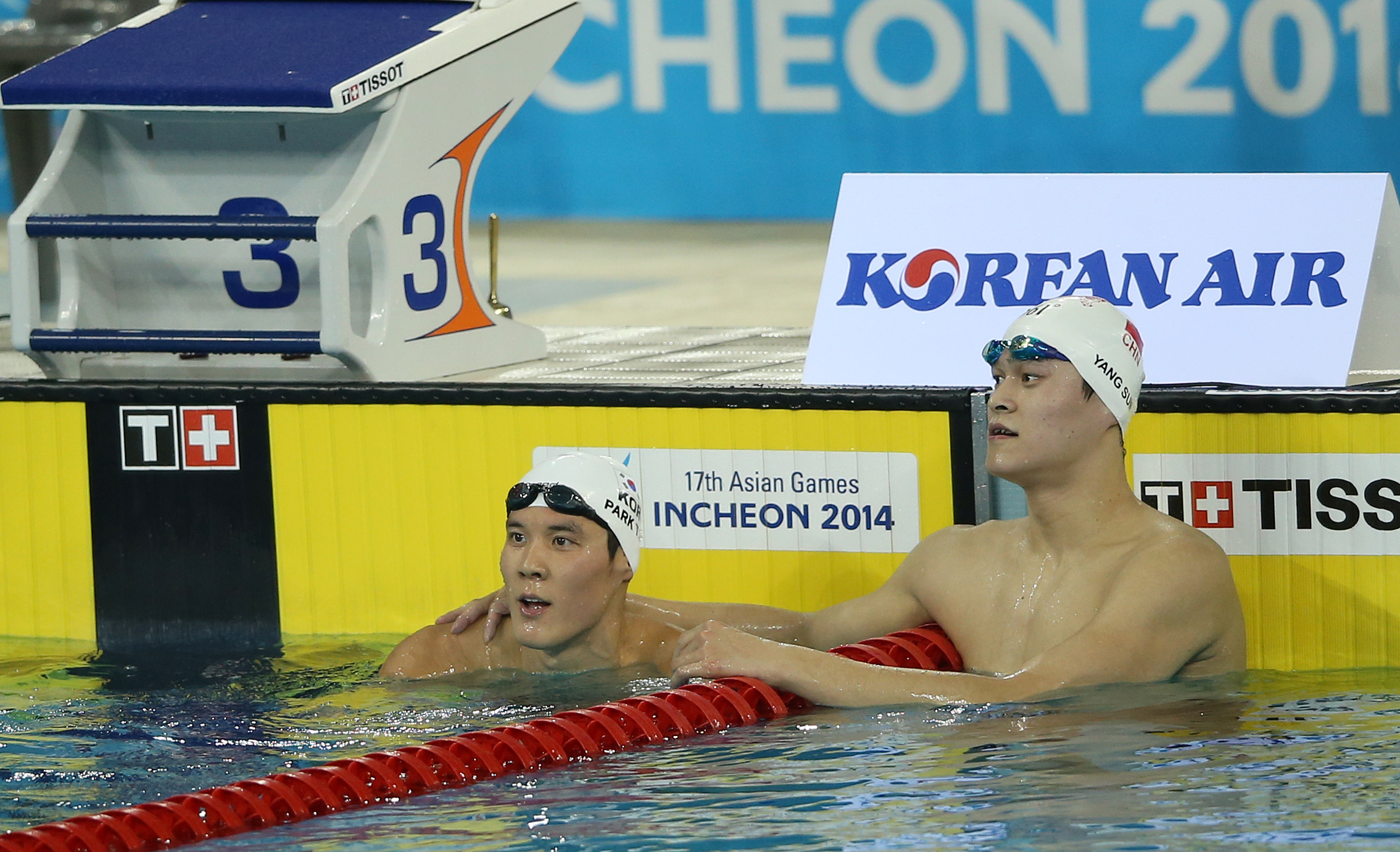
Sun and Park Tae-hwan at the 2014 Asian Games

In May 2014, the Chinese Swimming Association handed Sun a warning but let him off without suspension after he tested positive for trimetazidine, a drug that was banned four months earlier and classified as a stimulant at the time by the World Anti-Doping Agency (WADA). It was December 2014 at the insistence of FINA, the global regulator, that Chinada confirmed it had handed Sun a retrospective suspension of three months. The lenient penalty was based on this: Sun said that Dr. Ba Zhen, an Olympic team doctor for Chinese swimming, prescribed the drug to treat heart palpitations, a condition he has suffered since 2008, and was unaware that it had been newly added to the banned substances list.

After reviewing the full case file, WADA chose not to pursue the case after an investigation. They also announced that they would not challenge the CSA's decision to impose a retrospective three-month sanction. Since Sun's ban, WADA has reclassified trimetazidine from an S6 stimulant (prohibited in competition) to an S4 hormone and metabolic modulator (prohibited in and out of competition). Ba Zhen was handed two suspensions by WADA, the first for supplying a banned substance to Sun, the second, to run concurrently, because journalist Craig Lord alerted WADA to a photograph confirming that the doctor had worked with Sun at the Asian Games in August 2014 at a time when he ought to have been serving a suspension. Asked by FINA to explain, the CSA said that Ba Zhen had not been accredited for the Games through them. Ba Zhen also played a part in events that led to Sun's suspension for four years and three months after an altercation with anti-doping testers in September 2018.

Sun claimed a gold medal in the 200-metre freestyle at Chinese Spring Nationals in May 2014. At the 2014 Asian Games, Sun participated in the 200, 400, and 1500 metre freestyle events. He won silver in the 200 metre freestyle, finishing behind Kosuke Hagino. In the 400 metre freestyle, he came 1st with a time of 3:43.23, which was 1.25 seconds ahead of runner-up Hagino. Leading from start to finish, Sun won gold in the 1500 metre freestyle. He finished with a time of 14:49.75, over five seconds ahead of runner-up Kohei Yamamoto. Sun also participated in the 4 × 100 metre freestyle relay, helping China win gold with an overall time of 3:13.17, setting a new Asian Record in the event.

=== 2015 World Championships ===
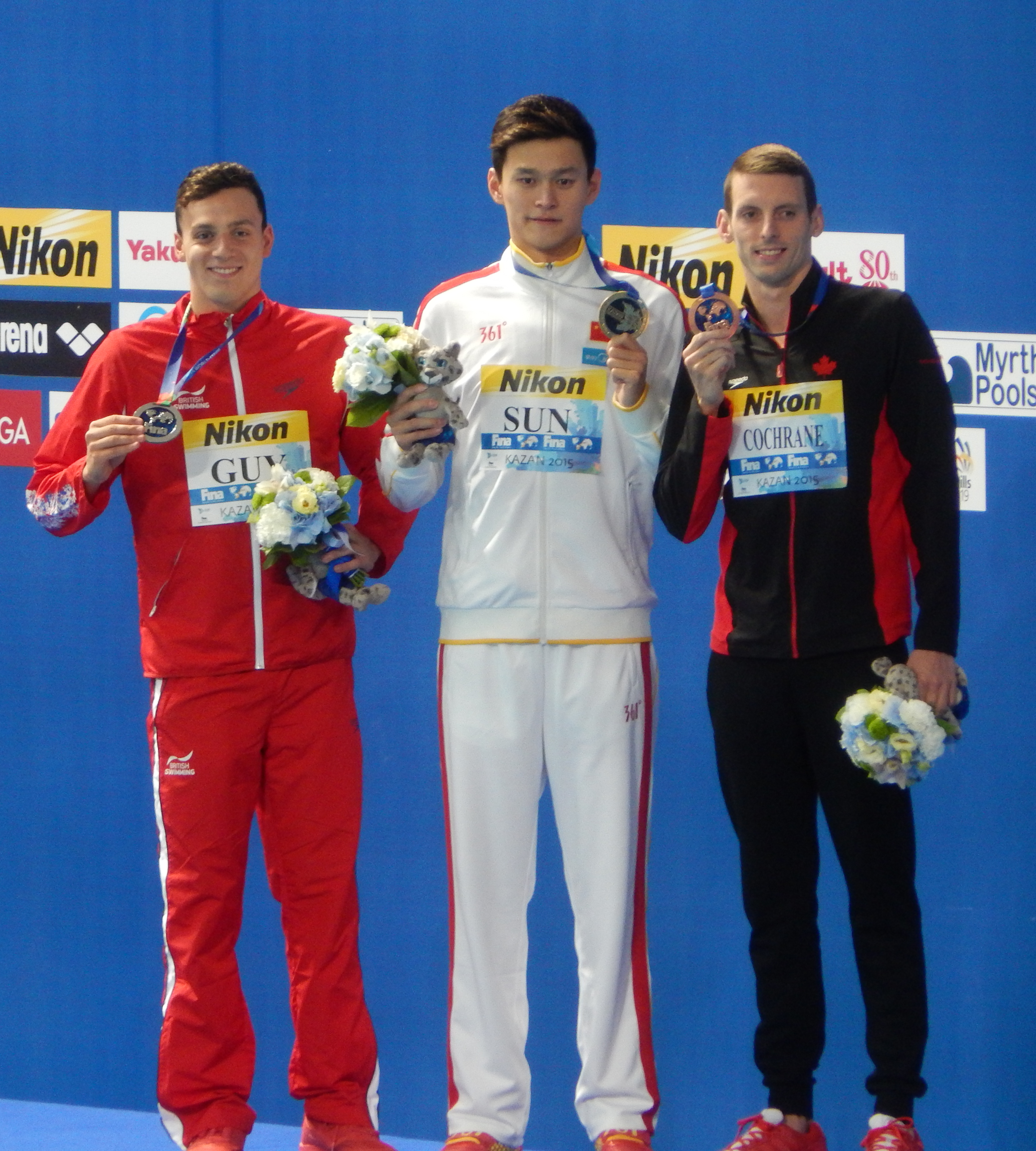
Sun, James Guy, and Ryan Cochrane at the 400 metre freestyle victory ceremony at the 2015 World Championships

At the 2015 World Championships, Sun won silver in the 200 metre freestyle with a time of 1:45.20, finishing 0.06 seconds behind James Guy. In the 400 metre freestyle, he won gold with a time of 3:42.58, finishing 1.17 seconds ahead of Guy. He finished 1st in the 800 metre freestyle with a time of 7:39.96, which was 0.85 seconds ahead of runner-up Gregorio Paltrinieri.

In the 1500 metre freestyle, where he was the two-time defending champion, Sun withdrew from the competition, later citing heart problems during a warm-up. "I feel very sorry that I couldn't be present for the 1500m", Sun told reporters. "I didn't feel good in my heart. Today I felt really uncomfortable at the pool during my warm-up and I had to give up the idea of competing. I feel really sorry about that."

At the World Championships, Sun was accused by Brazilian coaches of assaulting one of their female swimmers, Larissa Oliveira. Brazil team spokeswoman Eliana Alves told the Associated Press that there was "contact" between Sun and Oliveira, "but it was not a fight". Swimming's world governing body, FINA, later cleared Sun of any wrongdoing. FINA executive director Cornel Marculescu explained that the altercation that led to a complaint against Sun was due to congestion in the warm-up pool, and did not warrant further action. According to Marculescu, there were over 1,000 swimmers present, so the preparation pool became very crowded.

=== 2016: Historic first at the Olympics ===
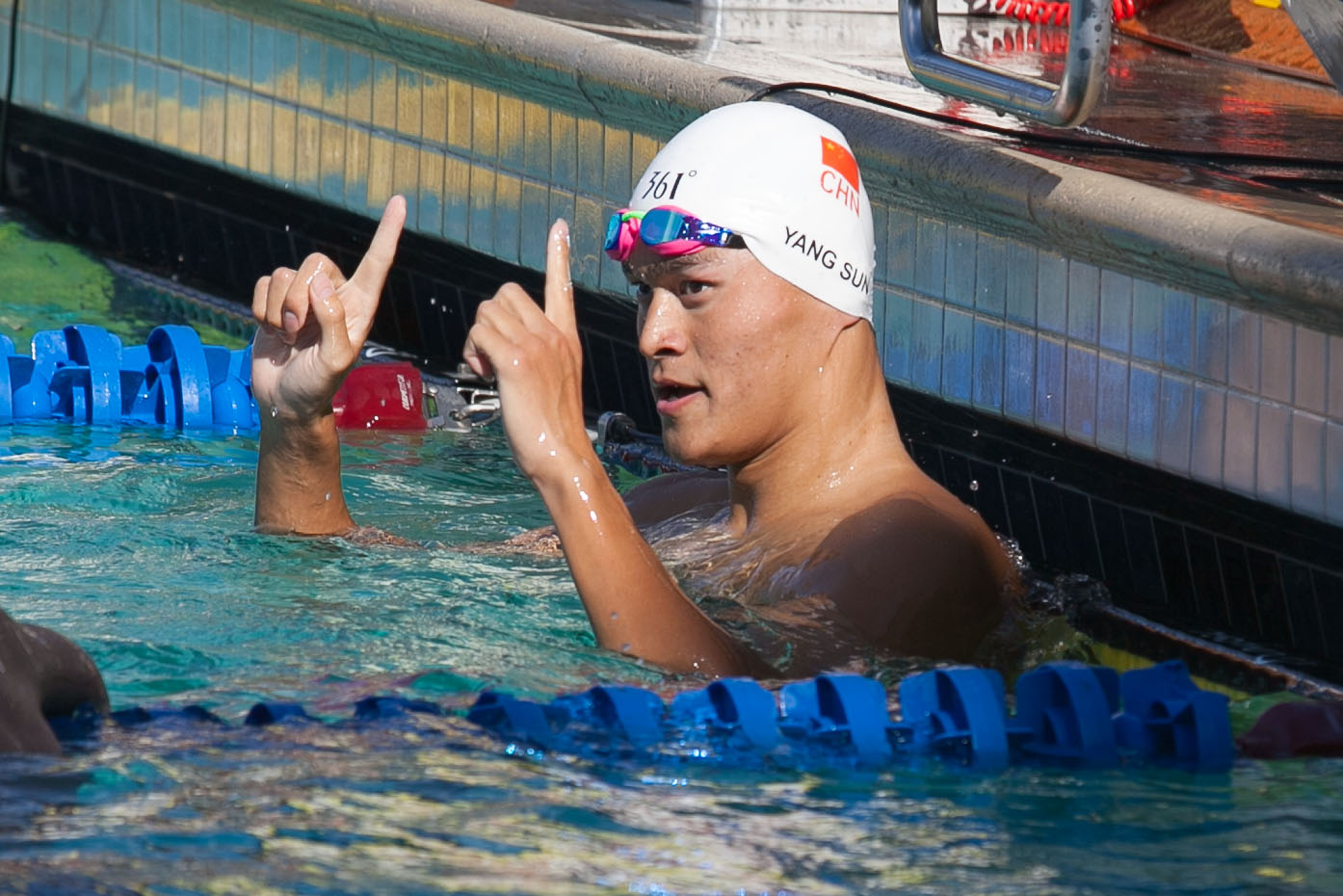
Sun after winning the 200 metre freestyle at the 2016 Arena Pro Swim Series

In June 2016, Sun competed at the Arena Pro Swim Series finale in Santa Clara, California. He won the 200 metre freestyle event with a time of 1:44.82, giving him 1st in the world ranks. At the 2016 Summer Olympics, Sun won the 200 metre freestyle with a time of 1:44.65, finishing 0.55 seconds ahead of runner-up Chad le Clos. It was Sun's first major international title in this event, and he became the first Chinese athlete to win a gold medal in this event. He won a silver medal in the 400 metre freestyle with a time of 3:41.68, finishing 0.13 seconds behind Mack Horton of Australia. Sun finished 16th in the qualifying heats of the 1500 metre freestyle, clocking in at 15:01.97. With his 200-metre freestyle gold medal and his 400 and 1500 metre freestyle gold medals from the 2012 Summer Olympics, Sun became the first swimmer in history to win Olympic gold medals in the 200, 400, and 1500 metre freestyle events.

The lead-up to the 400 metre freestyle was marred by controversy. Sun was accused of splashing water into rival Horton's face during practice. Horton accused Sun of attempting to distract him. Sun and Xu Qi, the Chinese swim team manager, denied the allegations and said it must have been a misunderstanding. Horton responded by accusing Sun of being a "drug cheat", in reference to his 2014 suspension. Horton's social media pages garnered negative criticism from Chinese fans, with many calling the Australian as a racist, a "snake", and a "disrespectful person". The Chinese Swimming Association requested an apology for the allegation, stating that Horton's claims "have greatly damaged sporting ties between China and Australia, and damaged the image of Australian athletes"; the request was turned down. Further controversy arose when the Global Times, a Chinese newspaper, printed critical editorials about Australia. An op-ed piece in another Chinese newspaper, Changjiang Daily, called for calm and indicated that the dispute was only between the two athletes and should not become a conflict between the two countries.

=== 2017–18: Asian Games success and testing incident ===
In 2017, Sun competed at the World Championships. In the 200 metre freestyle, Sun won gold with a time of 1:44.39, setting a new Asian and Chinese national record. In the 400 metre freestyle, he won gold with a time of 3:41.38, finishing 2.47 seconds ahead of runner-up Mack Horton and winning his third straight 400 metre freestyle world title. Sun finished 5th in the 800 metre freestyle, failing to defend his title. He withdrew from the 1500 metre freestyle.

In August 2018, Sun competed in every freestyle event from the 200 to the 1500 metre freestyle at the Asian Games. He also competed in the 4 × 100 and 4 × 200 metre freestyle relay events. In the 200 metre freestyle, Sun won gold with a time of 1:45.43. He finished 1st in the 400 metre freestyle with a time of 3:42.92, over four seconds ahead of runner-up Naito Ehara. By beating Horton's time of 3:43.76 from the 2018 Commonwealth Games, Sun became the number-one swimmer in the world for that event for 2018. In the men's 800 metre freestyle, which was introduced to the Asian Games for the first time, he won gold with a time of 7:48.36. In the 1500 metre freestyle, he finished 1st with a time of 14:58.53, beating runner-up Nguyễn Huy Hoàng by over three seconds. It was the first time Sun swam the event within 15 minutes since the 2014 Asian Games, and his third consecutive Asian Games title in the 1500 metre freestyle. Representing China, Sun helped his team finish second in the 4 × 100 metre freestyle relay with an overall time of 3:13.29, behind Japan's time of 3:12.68. In the 4 × 200 metre freestyle relay, he helped China win silver with an overall time of 7:05.45, behind Japan's 7:05.17.

In September 2018, Sun experienced an out-of-competition test at his home. Following investigations, FINA's inquiry panel ultimately concluded that "Mr. Sun Yang has not committed an anti-doping rule violation", which FINA accepted. In December at the 2018 FINA World Swimming Championships (25 m), Sun participated in the 4 × 200 metre freestyle relay, helping China win bronze.

=== 2019 World Championships ===
At the 2019 World Championships, Sun finished 2nd behind Danas Rapšys in the 200 metre freestyle. After the race was over, Rapšys was disqualified for a false start, giving Sun the gold and his third straight medal in the event at the World Championships. In the 400 metre freestyle, Sun won gold with a time of 3:42.44, finishing 0.73 seconds ahead of runner-up Horton and earning his fourth consecutive title in this event. He is the first and the only swimmer to do so.

Sun clashed with Duncan Scott during the 200 metre freestyle presentation. Both the British and Australian camps had been critical about Sun's actions the year prior. Scott refused to share the podium with Sun, and neither competitor shook hands, after which Sun could be seen gesturing and shouting at Scott. In a similar incident a few days earlier, Australian swimmer Mack Horton had also refused to share the podium with Sun. Horton was given an official warning by the sport's organising body, FINA. Following the medal ceremonies, Horton, Scott, and Sun were served letters by FINA, warning them about their behaviour. In a statement, FINA said: "While FINA respects the principle of freedom of speech, it has to be conducted in the right context ... [athletes should not] use FINA events to make personal statements or gestures". Despite Horton not having any evidence of cheating against Sun, except for the circumstantial FINA and later CAS ruling against Sun on unrelated charges, he claims to "know" that Sun was doping, and says his stance is not personal or due to national prejudice.

=== 2024: Back after suspension ===
At the 2024 Chinese National Summer Swimming Championships in Hefei, Anhui, Yang qualified with the second fastest time of 3:54.98 in the preliminaries, which was his first appearance after a 51-month suspension. In the final, Sun won with a time of 3:49.58.

== Controversies ==
=== 2013 driving without license ===
On 3 November 2013, Sun was found driving without a licence following a collision in Hangzhou. He was ordered to be detained for seven days by the police and fined CN¥5,000. On 4 November, he issued a public apology: "I should have been a role model as an athlete and a public figure, but I failed my responsibility ... I am deeply sorry for what I have done and will reflect on my behavior." On 6 November, the State General Administration of Sports announced that Sun was temporarily banned from the national team swimming camp and all competitions and business-related activities. On 24 April 2014, Sun had his endorsement and business-related ban lifted as a result of "good behavior".

=== 2014 doping ban ===
In May 2014, Sun was banned for three months by the Chinese Swimming Association (CSA) after he tested positive for trimetazidine, a drug that had been included on a ban list four months earlier and was newly classified as a stimulant at the time by the World Anti-Doping Agency (WADA). The substance was later reclassified from a S6 stimulant (prohibited in competition) to an S4 hormone and metabolic modulator (prohibited in and out of competition). Sun was tested while competing in the Chinese national swimming championships, and said that a doctor prescribed the drug to treat heart palpitations, a condition he has suffered since 2008, and that he was unaware that it had been newly added to the banned substances list. He was eligible to file a medical exception to use the drug for his heart condition, but he did not do so.

The World Anti-Doping Agency (WADA) admonished the Chinese Swimming Association for tardiness in reporting the failed test and the subsequent ban until after it had been served, meaning that Sun never missed a major event. FINA's handling of the case was criticized for allegedly "protect[ing] one of the sport's biggest stars in a key market". According to Swimming World Magazine, Sun's mother Yang Ming said in a now-deleted social media post that the Chinese Swimming Association attempted to hide Sun's three-month suspension in 2014.

In January 2015, WADA reclassified and downgraded trimetazidine from "stimulant" to "modulator of cardiac metabolism", prohibiting its use out of competition in addition to the previous prohibition of use in competition. Ben Nichols, a WADA representative, explained that drugs like trimetazidine are reclassified and downgraded when they are recognised as being less likely to be used as doping agents and trimetazidine will be moved off the prohibited stimulant list as of January 1, 2015. It remains a banned substance as of 2020. WADA criticised the CSA for its lateness in reporting the failed test result and subsequent ban until after it had been served. WADA, which had a right to petition if it believes a sanction to be lenient, chose not to take further action after reviewing the case. CHINADA (China Anti-Doping Agency) deputy director Zhao Jia said that "Sun proved with sufficient evidence that he did not intend to cheat, which helped reduce his ban to three months", but he was stripped of his win in the 1500 metre freestyle at the 2014 Chinese nationals. One Australian writer opined that the punishment was lenient, but pointed out that Yang was not found to have doped intentionally. After the ban, Swimming Australia ordered coach Denis Cotterell to stop working with Sun, but Cotterell continued coaching him.

=== 2018 testing incident and 2020 ban ===
On the night of 4 September 2018, three anti-doping testers from IDTM, the organisation responsible for conducting out-of-competition doping tests around the world, arrived at Sun's home in Zhejiang province and were asked to wait outside for almost an hour because the swimmer was not home. The testers took photographs to prove they were there as the swimmer's chosen one-hour window of availability between 10 and 11 pm was about to close. Sun had almost missed this deadline for testing but managed to arrive within the window. After giving blood, he was escorted to the bathroom by a doping control assistant (DCA) to be observed passing urine. Sun noticed the DCA had been taking pictures of him and requested his accreditation, which was not provided. The DCA later said he was a construction worker.

After calling his coach, his lawyer, and the head of the Chinese swimming delegation, Sun did not sign the testing paperwork and argued that the doping control officer's paperwork was incomplete and that two of the three members of the anti-doping party lacked proper identification. According to evidence presented to the Court of Arbitration for Sport (CAS), he offered to wait for a properly accredited team, but was rejected. The anti-doping testers later testified to the CAS that Sun and his entourage intimidated them.

By around 3:00 am, Sun's camp and the anti-doping testers were at a standoff. Sun's entourage including his doctor Ba Zhen, refused to let the testers take his blood vials. The testers refused to leave without their casing and had rejected Sun's suggestion for a properly credentialed team to come and do the work instead. During the argument Sun's team then directed his security guard to smash the case containing the vials to take back the vials containing Sun's blood. Sun believed that the testing personnel did not have proper credentials.

The official report from the FINA inquiry dated 3 January 2019 stated the following:

The blood that was initially collected (and subsequently destroyed) was not collected with proper authorisation and thus was not properly a "sample" ... as a result, the sample collection session initiated by IDTM on September 4, 2018, is invalid and void. No FINA DC rule violations can result therefrom. ... The conduct on the part of the DCA (doping control assistant) is highly improper and extremely unprofessional. This should never happen ... proof of this conduct by a DCA prior to the athlete providing a chaperoned urine sample is unquestionably reason to immediately suspend the DCA's involvement in the testing mission. ... Ultimately, the BCA (blood collection assistant) did not testify at the hearing or answer any questions from the athlete. The Doping Panel is left with significant doubt whether the BCA was properly qualified to draw blood from an athlete.

The inquiry panel concluded that "Mr. Sun Yang has not committed an anti-doping rule violation", which FINA accepted. Their official inquiry report concluded that the testing officer indeed did not abide to the proper testing protocol. WADA disagreed with FINA's decision and appealed to the Court of Arbitration for Sport (CAS), which accepted the case and held a public hearing in November 2019. Sun's lawyers told the Associated Press he requested that his CAS hearing to be public and "fully transparent to clear his name". FINA supported a move to stop the CAS hearing.

In January 2019, The Sunday Times published an exclusive article reporting that Sun and his entourage had presided over the smashing of a vial of the swimmer's blood sample with a hammer in front of anti-doping testers and that he may face a lifetime ban. However according to ABC reporter Tracey Holmes, media coverages claiming that the glass blood vials being smashed, were incorrect as the blood vials themselves were not smashed, but only the outer container carrying it. Sun himself has threatened legal action against The Sunday Times, according to a report that appeared on the Channel News Asia website. The swimmer claimed that the officials had failed to produce proper documentation for the testing, resulting in himself attempting to reject the testing.

On February 3, leading rivals and the World Swimming Coaches Association called for Sun to be banned. After The Sunday Times report, Wada, the global anti-doping regulator opened an inquiry and announced on March 13, 2019, to appeal the ruling at the Court of Arbitration for Sport. CAS issued a report on 20 August 2019, stating the appeal hearing brought by WADA against Sun and FINA in September had been postponed due to a party's unexpected personal circumstances. It was announced that the hearing date would be rescheduled and made open to the public, including to the media, as requested. WADA requested for a ban of between two and eight years according to a later media release from CAS.

According to Sun's coach Dennis Cotterell, the drug test conducted on the 4 September 2018, was the swimmer's ninth drug test in two weeks. Sun had just finished competing in the Asian Games in Jakarta, Indonesia two days earlier. Sun Yang had competed and won Gold medals in the 200, 400, 800 and 1,500 metres freestyle. During the Asian Games, he had been tested five times and had passed all tests without any adverse analytical findings. A year before the 2018 testing incident, Sun had heated tensions with the same unnamed female doping control officer who presided over his sample collection in the 2018 incident. In 2017, the officer was a doping control assistant in training to become an officer. Sun wrote that the DCA "lacked proper accreditation and also lacked authorization to perform her assigned role". The report covering the 2017 disagreements of Sun and his testers did not clearly indicate that the quarrels were ever resolved.

On 15 November 2019, the public hearing was held at CAS in Montreux, Switzerland. It was live streamed and released online. The hearing was affected by translation issues throughout the day. According to Time, the translation issues made it unclear how much of the testimony and questions were understood, and both judges and lawyers expressed frustration. The transcript of Sun's final remarks in Chinese during the public hearing was posted online by Sun himself after the hearing.

On 18 November, the DCA, who remained anonymous and did not appear at the hearing, said that he was a construction worker rather than a trained doping tester. According to Xinhua News Agency, he had submitted his written testimony in Chinese to CAS and WADA several days before the hearing. WADA's lead counsel Richard Young referred to "concerns over intimidation and protection issues", while during cross-examination of witnesses WADA co-counsel Brent Rychener highlighted the threats and warnings made by members of Sun's entourage to the testing officers, including exchanges involving the swimmer's mother, Dr. Ba Zhen (the head of the Chinese Swimming Association), and Dr. Han Zhaoqi (the head of the Zheijang Anti-Doping Center). The WADA provided witness statements from the DCO and the BCA, indicating that they had been contacted by Sun's entourage and were "concerned for their physical and economic well-being, and for the well-being of their family members". They indicated they were "fearful that, if they would agree to testify in this proceeding, they would suffer significant retaliation in some form from [Sun Yang] and/or his entourage and supporters". WADA further noted if they had not issued an order, there would be little or no chance that IDTM's Sample Collection Personnel would be willing to testify under such threats.

On 28 February 2020, a panel of three senior judges at CAS unanimously found Sun guilty of refusing to co-operate with sample testers and banned him from swimming until February 2028. The eight year ban, the maximum CAS can hand out, was imposed because it was his second offence after his 2014 suspension. The panel said:

"it is one thing, having provided a blood sample, to question the accreditation of the testing personnel while keeping the intact samples in the possession of the testing authorities; it is quite another thing, after lengthy exchanges and warnings as to the consequences, to act in such a way that results in destroying the sample containers, thereby eliminating any chance of testing the sample at a later stage. It was striking that, in the course of his testimony, at no point did the athlete express any regret as to his actions, or indicate that, with the benefit of hindsight, it might have been preferable for him to have acted differently. Rather, as the proceedings unfolded, he dug his heels in and, eventually, sought to blame others for the manifest failings that occurred. At no point ... did he confront the possibility that he might have overreacted in his actions.“

WADA issued a statement welcoming the verdict, saying that the "CAS ruling confirms those concerns" about the original FINA decision that seemed to be incorrect under the World Anti-Doping Code. The ban rules Sun out for the 2020 Tokyo Olympics and "effectively ends his career". The only remaining possibility for Sun and his legal team is to appeal the decision to the Swiss Federal Court, but only on narrow procedural grounds. The court ruled that Sun can maintain the two world titles he won in South Korea. Soon after the verdict was announced, Sun told Xinhua News Agency he would definitely appeal the "unfair" ban. Some analysts said the hearing was marred by severe translation problems, conflict of interest, and bias. One Australian sports writer suggested that there was hypocrisy and double standards against Sun, with an actual "absence of evidence" around doping activity.

When the verdict was announced, Chinese online users continued to defend Sun while insulting his chief rival Mack Horton. An unnamed analyst noted that the harassment against Horton—which had been ongoing since 2016—was likely "state-orchestrated" on Sun's behalf, saying: "the [Horton] family's ordeal is believed to be well-organised and part of a systematic pattern of harassment and intimidation directed at perceived critics of China". This is not an amateur operation. The Hortons' story is very disturbing ... It says something about the reach of foreign powers within Australia." According to Jonathan White at SCMP, some Chinese users bypassing China's Great Firewall to log onto Instagram apologized to Horton for the harassment, with statements that include "sometimes our Chinese could not get the truth, but most of us are kind and goodness person" (sic), criticizing Sun as "arrogant" and a "baby", and noted that "Sun deleted all of his post-verdict posts purporting to offer new 'evidence'".

The CAS decision against Sun Yang was scrutinized, and many unknown facts about the case were brought to light, in an article published at Sports Integrity Initiative on 15 May 2020. The article stated that CAS decision against Sun Yang was "unfair" and needs to be overturned given the extenuating circumstances such as the test team not meeting standards and that the "DCO failed to give the required warning". And stated it was "highly probable" that Yang was innocent of doping as they pointed out context that Sun has just completed a "stressful competition" during which he had been tested many times and all those tests had come back negative. And that Sun at that time, after finishing a major competition, was about to start a vacation. Also that swimmers are allowed to miss two drug tests per year, and so that if Sun had anything to hide that night, he could have just skipped the test, and that Sun hasn't missed a single test in the previous 12 months before the incident. They also pointed out that Sun had also been tested shortly after the night in question, and that test had also came back negative. The article also alleged political bias in the three judge CAS panel and exhibited tweets from the panel president, former Italian Foreign Minister Franco Frattini, who in his tweets castigated the practice of dog slaughter and denounced the consumption of dog meat at a Chinese festival and had used racially tinged language. One of his tweets stated, "Torturing innocent animal is a flag of chinese!Sadics, inhumans with the protection of chinese authorities and the tolerance of western powers focusing on more business with China, regardless any massive violence!Shame on china and their protectors!". The South China Morning Post identified one of Frattini's tweets as "describing one person who appeared to mistreat a dog as a 'yellow face Chinese monster'". It also reported that Frattini denied that he was being a racist for his tweets. With the revelations of this article, Sun Yang's legal team filed a second request to appeal the verdict. This appeal was successful.

The CAS clarified that Sun ("the Athlete") would not be stripped of any of his medals because "doping tests performed on the Athlete shortly before and after the aborted doping control in September 2018 were negative" and "in the absence of any evidence that the Athlete may have engaged in doping activity since 4 September 2018, including on the occasion of the FINA World Championships in Gwangju, South Korea in July 2019, the results achieved by the Athlete in the period prior to the CAS award being issued should not be disqualified." On 24 December 2020, the verdict of eight-year ban for Sun was rescinded and referred back to CAS, after the Swiss Federal Tribunal upheld an appeal lodged by Sun against the chair of the CAS Panel. The SFT decision said that "doubts as to the impartiality of the arbitrator were objectively justified" The later CAS retrial on 22 June 2021 resulted in the suspension still being upheld but reduced the total suspension time to 4 years and three months. As of May 24, 2024, Sun is once again eligible for competition. However, because he missed Chinese Olympics Trials, he was not able to compete in the Paris Olympics.

== Major achievements ==
In 2012, Sun became the first Chinese man to win an Olympic gold medal in swimming. He is the first male swimmer in history to earn Olympic and World Championship gold medals at every freestyle distance between 200 and 1500 metres. A three-time Olympic gold medallist and eleven-time world champion, Sun is the most decorated Chinese swimmer in history. Sun's major achievements include:

Year	Competition	Venue	Position	Event	Ref
2008	"Good Luck Beijing" China Open	National Aquatics Center, Beijing, China	2nd	400 metre freestyle	
2008	2008 Summer Olympics	National Aquatics Center, Beijing, China	28th	400 metre freestyle	
2008	2008 Summer Olympics	National Aquatics Center, Beijing, China	8th	1500 metre freestyle	
2009	2009 World Championships	Foro Italico, Rome, Italy	18th	400 metre freestyle	
2009	2009 World Championships	Foro Italico, Rome, Italy	3rd	1500 metre freestyle	
2010	2010 Asian Games	Aoti Aquatics Centre, Guangzhou, China	2nd	200 metre freestyle	
2010	2010 Asian Games	Aoti Aquatics Centre, Guangzhou, China	2nd	400 metre freestyle	
2010	2010 Asian Games	Aoti Aquatics Centre, Guangzhou, China	1st (Note: Asian Record)	1500 metre freestyle	
2011	2011 World Championships	Shanghai Oriental Sports Center, Shanghai, China	2nd	400 metre freestyle	
2011	2011 World Championships	Shanghai Oriental Sports Center, Shanghai, China	1st	800 metre freestyle	
2011	2011 World Championships	Shanghai Oriental Sports Center, Shanghai, China	1st (Note: World Record)	1500 metre freestyle	
2012	2012 Summer Olympics	London Aquatics Centre, London, UK	2nd	200 metre freestyle	
2012	2012 Summer Olympics	London Aquatics Centre, London, UK	1st (Note: Olympic Record)	400 metre freestyle	
2012	2012 Summer Olympics	London Aquatics Centre, London, UK	1st (Note: World Record)	1500 metre freestyle	
2013	2013 World Championships	Palau Sant Jordi, Barcelona, Spain	1st	400 metre freestyle	
2013	2013 World Championships	Palau Sant Jordi, Barcelona, Spain	1st	800 metre freestyle	
2013	2013 World Championships	Palau Sant Jordi, Barcelona, Spain	1st	1500 metre freestyle	
2014	2014 Asian Games	Munhak Park Tae-hwan Aquatics Center, Incheon, South Korea	2nd	200 metre freestyle	
2014	2014 Asian Games	Munhak Park Tae-hwan Aquatics Center, Incheon, South Korea	1st	400 metre freestyle	
2014	2014 Asian Games	Munhak Park Tae-hwan Aquatics Center, Incheon, South Korea	1st	1500 metre freestyle	
2015	2015 World Championships	Kazan Arena, Kazan, Russia	2nd	200 metre freestyle	
2015	2015 World Championships	Kazan Arena, Kazan, Russia	1st	400 metre freestyle	
2015	2015 World Championships	Kazan Arena, Kazan, Russia	1st	800 metre freestyle	
2016	2016 Summer Olympics	Olympic Aquatics Stadium, Rio de Janeiro, Brazil	1st	200 metre freestyle	
2016	2016 Summer Olympics	Olympic Aquatics Stadium, Rio de Janeiro, Brazil	2nd	400 metre freestyle	
2016	2016 Summer Olympics	Olympic Aquatics Stadium, Rio de Janeiro, Brazil	16th	1500 metre freestyle	
2017	2017 World Championships	Danube Arena, Budapest, Hungary	1st (Note: Asian Record, National Record)	200 metre freestyle	
2017	2017 World Championships	Danube Arena, Budapest, Hungary	1st	400 metre freestyle	
2017	2017 World Championships	Danube Arena, Budapest, Hungary	5th	800 metre freestyle	
2018	2018 Asian Games	GBK Aquatic Stadium, Jakarta, Indonesia	1st	200 metre freestyle	
2018	2018 Asian Games	GBK Aquatic Stadium, Jakarta, Indonesia	1st	400 metre freestyle	
2018	2018 Asian Games	GBK Aquatic Stadium, Jakarta, Indonesia	1st	800 metre freestyle	
2018	2018 Asian Games	GBK Aquatic Stadium, Jakarta, Indonesia	1st	1500 metre freestyle	
2019	2019 World Championships	Gwangju, South Korea	1st	200 metre freestyle	
2019	2019 World Championships	Gwangju, South Korea	1st	400 metre freestyle	

== Honours and awards ==
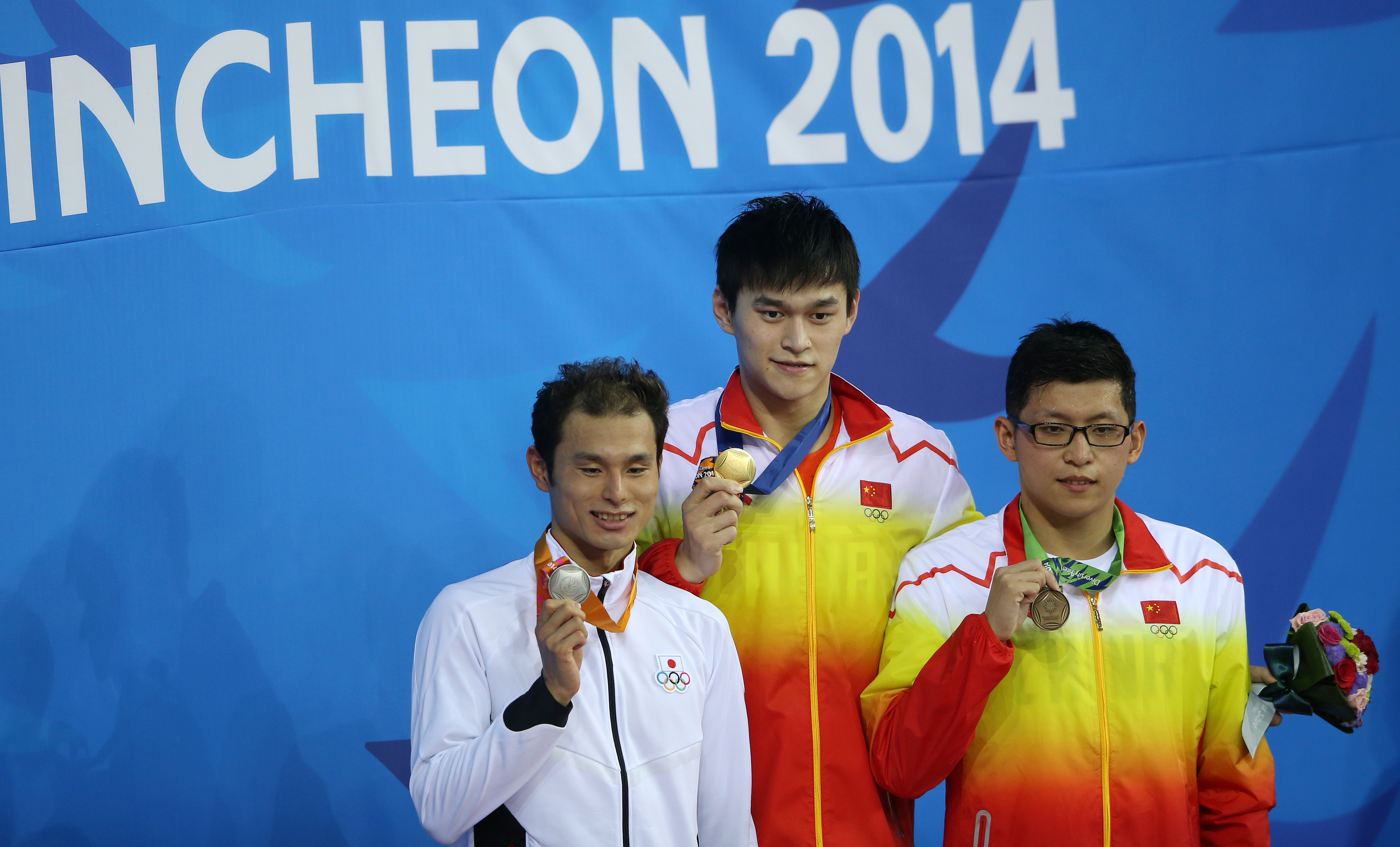
Sun with a gold medal at the 2014 Asian Games

As of 2019, Sun has received the following awards:

- Swimming World World Swimmer of the Year Award: 2013
- Swimming World Pacific Rim Swimmer of the Year Award: 2011, 2012, 2013, 2017, 2018
- SwimSwam Swammy Awards "Asian Male Swimmer of the Year" Award: 2017
- FINA "Outstanding Contribution to Swimming Popularity in China" Award: 2017
- FINA World Championships "Best Male Swimmer" Award: 2013, 2015
- China Laureus "Best Male Athlete" Award: 2011, 2017
- China Laureus "Most Popular Male Athlete" Award: 2017
- CCTV Sports Awards "Best Male Athlete" Award: 2011, 2012
- CCTV Sports Awards "Rookie of the Year" Award: 2010
- Zhejiang Province "Best Male Athlete of the Year" Award: 2016

== Personal bests ==
Long course personal bests
Event	Time	Venue	Date	Note(s)
100 metre freestyle	48.94	Shenyang	8 September 2013	
200 metre freestyle	1:44.39	Budapest	25 July 2017	NR, AS
400 metre freestyle	3:40.14	London	28 July 2012	OR, AS, NR
800 metre freestyle	7:38.57	Shanghai	27 July 2011	
1500 metre freestyle	14:31.02	London	4 August 2012	AS, NR

Key: AS = Asian Record, NR = National Record, OR = Olympic Record

== Personal life ==
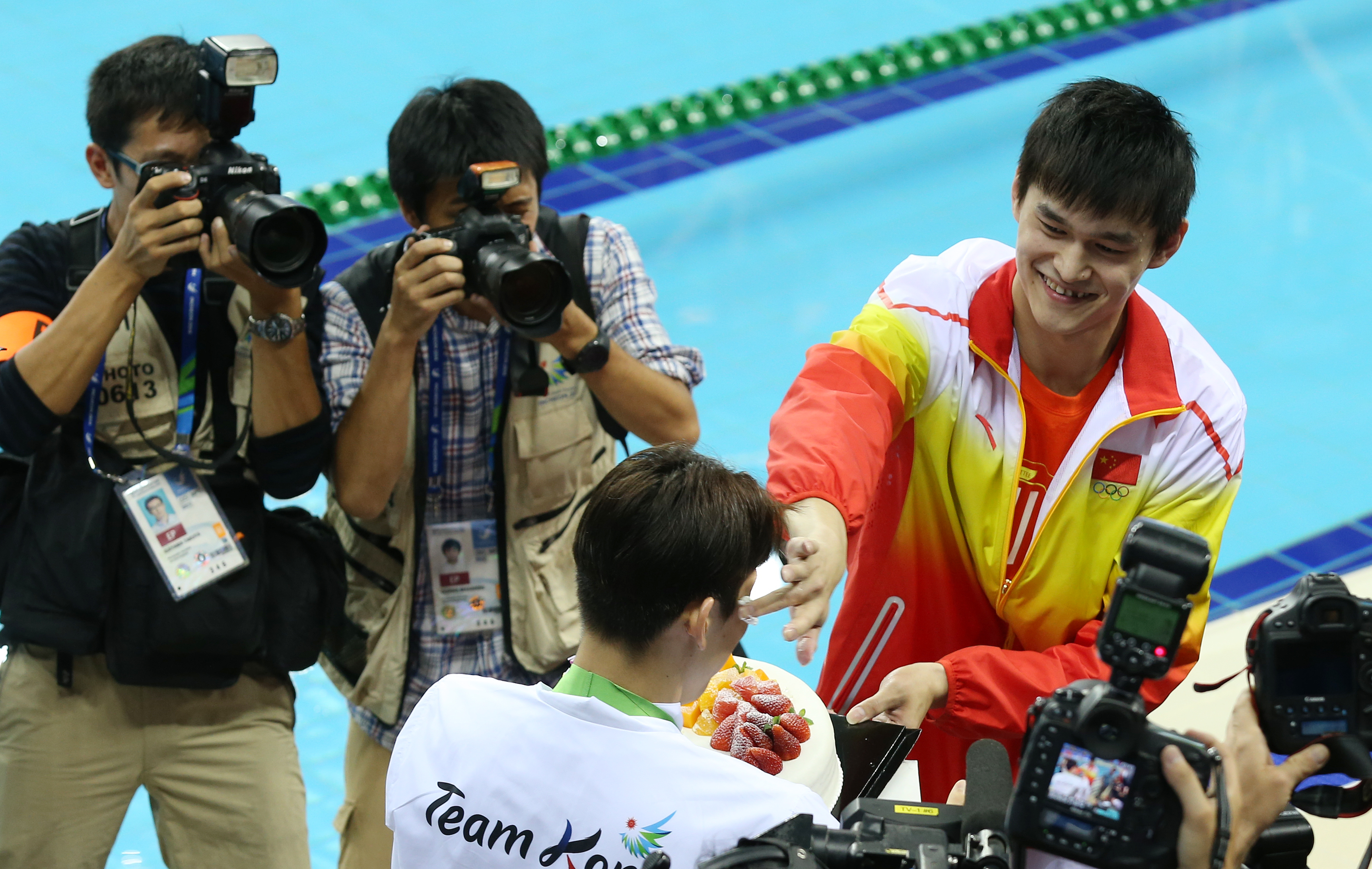
Sun giving Park Tae-hwan a tailor-made birthday cake to celebrate Park's birthday at the 2014 Asian Games

In July 2014, Sun graduated from Zhejiang University with a bachelor's degree in sports studies. According to FINA, Sun "has studied for a master's degree in physical education at Soochow University". In 2018, he began his Doctor of Philosophy degree in kinesiology at the Shanghai University of Sport in Shanghai, China.

Sun's sporting philosophy is "You succeed when you believe that you can succeed". His idol is Chinese swimmer Zhang Lin. In addition to swimming, Sun enjoys listening to music and playing basketball.

On 20 July 2023, Sun announced his marriage to former rhythmic gymnast Zhang Doudou.

== See also ==
- China at the 2012 Summer Olympics
- China at the 2016 Summer Olympics

Preceded by Grant Hackett	Men's 1500 metre freestyle world record holder (long course); 31 July 2011–4 August 2024	Succeeded by Bobby Finke
