= Swimming at the 2010 Asian Games – Men's 1500 metre freestyle =

Men's 1500 metre freestyle at the 2010 Asian Games
- Venue: Aoti Aquatics Centre
- Date: 18 November 2010
- Competitors: 13 from 11 nations

Medalists
gold medal	Sun Yang	China
silver medal	Park Tae-hwan	South Korea
bronze medal	Zhang Lin	China

The men's 1500 metre freestyle event at the 2010 Asian Games took place on 18 November 2010 at Guangzhou Aoti Aquatics Centre.

There were 13 competitors from 11 countries who took part in this event. 8 swimmers with the fast qualifying time were in the fast heat, the others were in the slow heat. The final ranking was arranged by the times from both heats.

Sun Yang from China won the gold medal in a new Asian record of 14 minutes 35.43 seconds. It was the second all-time behind only Grant Hackett's world record of 14:34.56 from the 2001 World Championships, the gap between the world record is less than one second.

== Schedule ==
All times are China Standard Time (UTC+08:00)

Date	Time	Event
Thursday, 18 November 2010	09:46	Slow heat
Thursday, 18 November 2010	18:56	Fast heat

== Records ==
Prior to this competition, the existing world, Asian and Games records were as follows.

World Record	Grant Hackett (AUS)	14:34.56	Fukuoka, Japan	29 July 2001
Asian Record	Zhang Lin (CHN)	14:45.84	Beijing, China	15 August 2008
Games Record	Park Tae-hwan (KOR)	14:55.03	Doha, Qatar	7 December 2006

== Results ==
Rank	Heat	Athlete	Time	Notes
1st place, gold medalist(s)	2	Sun Yang (CHN)	14:35.43	AR
2nd place, silver medalist(s)	2	Park Tae-hwan (KOR)	15:01.72	
3rd place, bronze medalist(s)	2	Zhang Lin (CHN)	15:22.03	
4	2	Jang Sang-jin (KOR)	15:49.26	
5	2	Sho Uchida (JPN)	15:52.29	
6	2	Kevin Yeap (MAS)	15:53.34	
7	2	Ryan Arabejo (PHI)	16:11.74	
8	1	Mandar Divase (IND)	16:11.84	
9	2	Punyawee Sontana (THA)	16:26.21	
10	1	Ahmad Al-Shatti (IOC)	16:30.98	
11	1	Loai Tashkandi (KSA)	17:16.41	
12	1	Ali Adel (IRQ)	18:36.33	
13	1	Ibrahim Al-Amadi (QAT)	19:37.04	
