= Swimming at the 2018 Asian Games – Men's 400 metre freestyle =

Men's 400 metre freestyle at the 2018 Asian Games
- Venue: Gelora Bung Karno Aquatic Stadium
- Date: 21 August 2018
- Competitors: 22 from 13 nations

Medalists
gold medal	Sun Yang	China
silver medal	Naito Ehara	Japan
bronze medal	Kosuke Hagino	Japan

The men's 400 metre freestyle event at the 2018 Asian Games took place on 21 August at the Gelora Bung Karno Aquatic Stadium.

== Schedule ==
All times are Western Indonesia Time (UTC+07:00)

Date	Time	Event
Tuesday, 21 August 2018	09:58	Heats
Tuesday, 21 August 2018	19:13	Final

== Records ==
Prior to this competition, the existing world, Asian and Games records were as follows.

World Record	Paul Biedermann (GER)	3:40.07	Rome, Italy	26 July 2009
Asian Record	Sun Yang (CHN)	3:40.14	London, United Kingdom	28 July 2012
Games Record	Park Tae-hwan (KOR)	3:41.53	Guangzhou, China	16 November 2010

== Results ==
=== Heats ===
Rank	Heat	Athlete	Time	Notes
1	3	Sun Yang (CHN)	3:49.13	
2	3	Kosuke Hagino (JPN)	3:50.67	
3	2	Lee Ho-joon (KOR)	3:52.80	
4	2	Ji Xinjie (CHN)	3:53.11	
5	2	Naito Ehara (JPN)	3:53.24	
6	2	Nguyễn Hữu Kim Sơn (VIE)	3:54.01	
7	3	Khader Baqlah (JOR)	3:54.27	
8	2	Aflah Fadlan Prawira (INA)	3:54.45	
9	3	Welson Sim (MAS)	3:54.48	
10	3	Cheuk Ming Ho (HKG)	3:55.13	
11	2	Glen Lim (SGP)	3:55.59	
12	2	Mokhtar Al-Yamani (YEM)	3:57.61	
13	3	Pang Sheng Jun (SGP)	4:01.26	
14	3	Jang Dong-hyeok (KOR)	4:03.46	
15	2	Putera Muhammad Randa (INA)	4:04.96	
16	1	Chan Chun Hei (HKG)	4:05.80	
17	3	Nguyễn Huy Hoàng (VIE)	4:10.66	
18	1	Boldbaataryn Buyantogtokh (MGL)	4:36.79	
19	1	Adam Barghouthy (PLE)	4:45.98	
20	1	Mubal Azzam Ibrahim (MDV)	4:48.44	
21	1	Boldbaataryn Batmönkh (MGL)	5:01.74	
22	1	Hussain Haish Hassan (MDV)	5:11.70	

=== Final ===
Rank	Athlete	Time	Notes
1st place, gold medalist(s)	Sun Yang (CHN)	3:42.92	
2nd place, silver medalist(s)	Naito Ehara (JPN)	3:47.14	
3rd place, bronze medalist(s)	Kosuke Hagino (JPN)	3:47.20	
4	Lee Ho-joon (KOR)	3:48.28	
5	Ji Xinjie (CHN)	3:50.06	
6	Nguyễn Hữu Kim Sơn (VIE)	3:51.67	
7	Khader Baqlah (JOR)	3:52.77	
8	Aflah Fadlan Prawira (INA)	3:53.01	
