= Katsuhiro Matsumoto =

Japanese swimmer (born 1997)

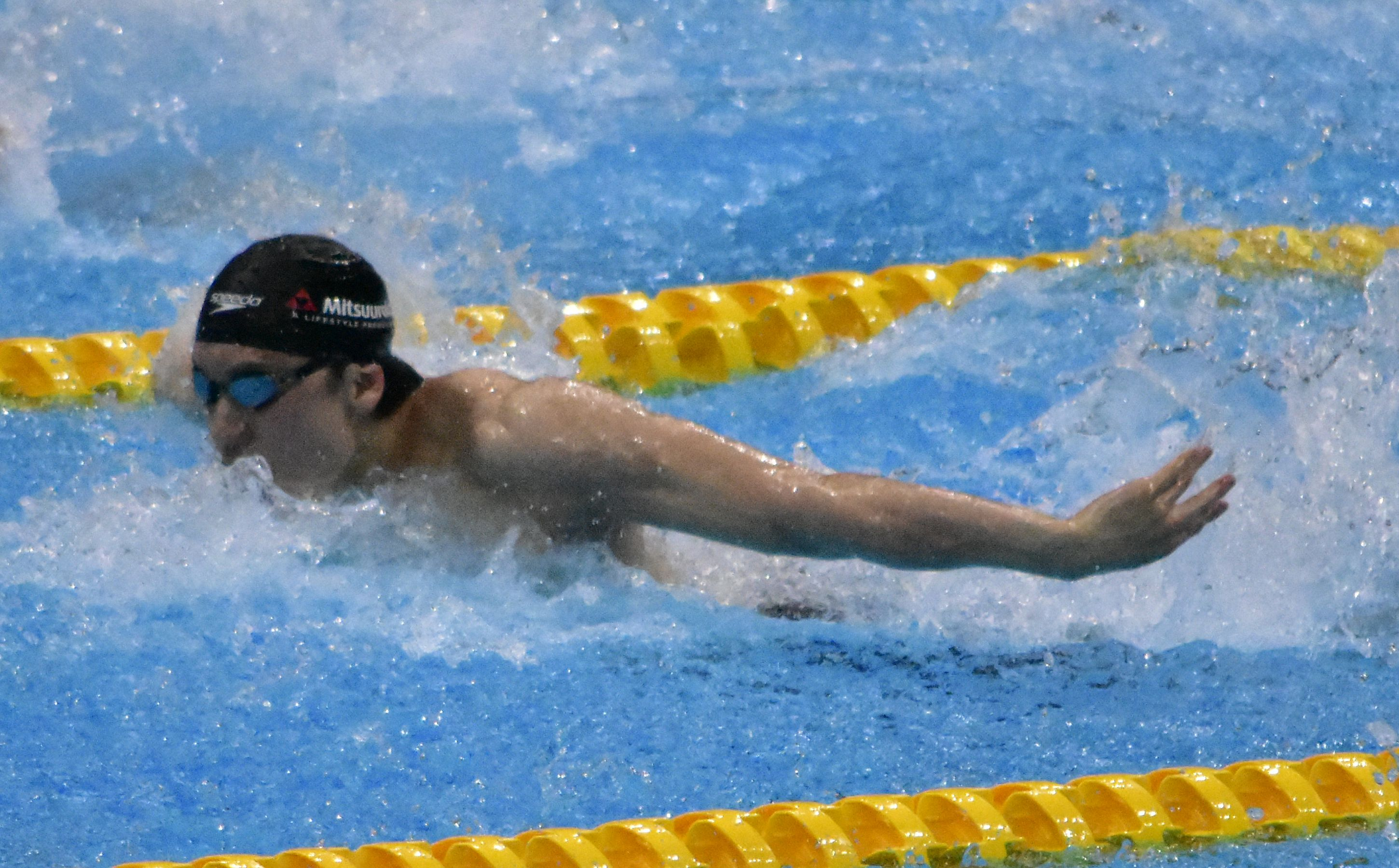
- Matsumoto in 2023

Personal information
- Nationality: Japanese
- Born: 28 February 1997 (age 29) Fukushima, Japan
- Height: 1.87 m (6 ft 2 in)
- Weight: 85 kg (187 lb)

Sport
- Sport: Swimming
- Strokes: Freestyle
- Club: Central Sports
Medal record
World Championships (LC)
Silver medal – second place	2019 Gwangju	200 m freestyle
World Championships (SC)
Silver medal – second place	2016 Windsor	4×200 m freestyle
Pan Pacific Championships
Bronze medal – third place	2018 Tokyo	200 m freestyle
Bronze medal – third place	2018 Tokyo	4×100 m freestyle
Bronze medal – third place	2018 Tokyo	4×200 m freestyle
Bronze medal – third place	2026 Irvine	4×100 m freestyle
Bronze medal – third place	2026 Irvine	4×200 m freestyle
Asian Games
Gold medal – first place	2018 Jakarta	4×100 m freestyle
Gold medal – first place	2018 Jakarta	4×200 m freestyle
Gold medal – first place	2022 Hangzhou	100 m butterfly
Silver medal – second place	2018 Jakarta	200 m freestyle
Silver medal – second place	2026 Aichi–Nagoya	4×200 m freestyle
Bronze medal – third place	2022 Hangzhou	4×100 m freestyle
Bronze medal – third place	2022 Hangzhou	4×200 m freestyle
Bronze medal – third place	2022 Hangzhou	4×100 m medley
Bronze medal – third place	2026 Aichi–Nagoya	100 m butterfly
Bronze medal – third place	2026 Aichi–Nagoya	4×100 m freestyle
Asian Championships
Gold medal – first place	2016 Tokyo	4×200 m freestyle
Silver medal – second place	2016 Tokyo	4×100 m freestyle
Bronze medal – third place	2016 Tokyo	200 m freestyle
Universiade
Gold medal – first place	2017 Taipei	4×200 m freestyle
Bronze medal – third place	2015 Gwangju	4×200 m freestyle
Bronze medal – third place	2017 Taipei	4×100 m medley
Junior Pan Pacific Championships
Silver medal – second place	2014 Maui	4×200 m freestyle
Silver medal – second place	2014 Maui	4×100 m medley
Bronze medal – third place	2014 Maui	200 m freestyle

Katsuhiro Matsumoto (松元 克央, Matsumoto Katsuhiro; born 28 February 1997) is a Japanese swimmer who specializes in freestyle. He is a silver medalist at the World Championships.

== Career ==
He competed in the men's 200 metre freestyle event at the 2017 World Aquatics Championships. At the 2019 World Aquatics Championships held in Gwangju, South Korea, Katsuhiro Matsumoto came third in the 200 m freestyle, but the first-placed finisher Danas Rapšys was disqualified for a false start, so Matsumoto was awarded a silver medal. He qualified to represent Japan at the 2020 Summer Olympics.
