= Jonathan Tan (swimmer) =

Singaporean swimmer (born 2002)

Personal information
- Full name: Jonathan Tan Eu Jin
- Nickname: Johnny
- Born: 11 March 2002 (age 24) Singapore

Sport
- Sport: Swimming
- Strokes: freestyle, medley
- Coach: Gary Tan
Medal record
Men's swimming
Representing Singapore
Event	1st	2nd	3rd
Asian Games	0	0	2
Southeast Asian Games	10	3	2
Commonwealth Youth Games	1	0	1
Total	11	3	5
Asian Games
Bronze medal – third place	2018 Jakarta	4×100 m freestyle
Bronze medal – third place	2018 Jakarta	4×200 m freestyle
Southeast Asian Games
Gold medal – first place	2019 Philippines	50 m freestyle
Gold medal – first place	2019 Philippines	4×100 m freestyle
Gold medal – first place	2019 Philippines	4×200 m freestyle
Gold medal – first place	2021 Vietnam	4×100 m medley
Gold medal – first place	2023 Cambodia	50 m freestyle
Gold medal – first place	2023 Cambodia	100 m freestyle
Gold medal – first place	2023 Cambodia	4×100 m medley
Gold medal – first place	2023 Cambodia	4×100 m freestyle
Gold medal – first place	2025 Thailand	4×100 m freestyle
Gold medal – first place	2025 Thailand	4×100 m medley
Silver medal – second place	2021 Vietnam	50 m freestyle
Silver medal – second place	2021 Vietnam	100 m freestyle
Silver medal – second place	2023 Cambodia	4×200 m freestyle
Bronze medal – third place	2021 Vietnam	4×200 m freestyle
Bronze medal – third place	2025 Thailand	4×200 m freestyle
Commonwealth Youth Games
Gold medal – first place	2017 Nassau	4×100 m mixed freestyle
Bronze medal – third place	2017 Nassau	100 m freestyle

Jonathan Tan Eu Jin (born 11 March 2002) is a Singaporean swimmer. He represented Singapore at the 2019 World Aquatics Championships held in Gwangju, South Korea and he finished in 34th place in the heats in the men's 50 metre freestyle event.

He qualified for the 2024 Summer Olympics after meeting the Olympics 'A' cut of 21.96 s for 50 m freestyle, clocking 21.91 s in the heats at the 2023 Southeast Asian Games.

== Swimming career ==
In 2018, Tan represented Singapore at the Asian Games held in Jakarta, Indonesia and he competed in one individual event and two relays events. He finished in 14th place in the heats in the men's 200 metre freestyle event. He won the bronze medal both in the men's 4 × 100 m freestyle relay and men's 4 × 200 m freestyle relay events.

During the 16th Singapore National Swimming Championships Invitationals in 2021, Tan broke his own national record for the men's 50m freestyle with 22.12 seconds and qualified for the 2021 Southeast Asian Games (SEA Games). However, it was 0.1 second slower than the required 22.02 seconds to qualify for the 2020 Summer Olympics held in Japan. Tan would also qualify for both 50m and 100m freestyle events for the 2021 SEA Games. Tan won the men's 200m freestyle event with 1 min 50.17 seconds but failed to qualify for both 2021 SEA Games and the 2020 Summer Olympics.

Tan competed in the men's 50 metre freestyle and men's 100 metre freestyle events at the 2024 Summer Olympics held in Paris, France.

== Education ==
Tan studied at Anglo-Chinese School from primary school to junior college. He graduated from Anglo-Chinese School (Independent) with an International Baccalaureate diploma. In 2022, Tan enrolled at Stanford University on a partial scholarship.
