= Swimming at the 2018 Asian Games – Men's 1500 metre freestyle =

Men's 1500 metre freestyle at the 2018 Asian Games
- Venue: Gelora Bung Karno Aquatic Stadium
- Date: 24 August 2018
- Competitors: 15 from 11 nations

Medalists
gold medal	Sun Yang	China
silver medal	Nguyễn Huy Hoàng	Vietnam
bronze medal	Ji Xinjie	China

The men's 1500 metre freestyle event at the 2018 Asian Games took place on 24 August at the Gelora Bung Karno Aquatic Stadium.

== Schedule ==
All times are Western Indonesia Time (UTC+07:00)

Date	Time	Event
Friday, 24 August 2018	09:33	Slowest heat
Friday, 24 August 2018	18:40	Fastest heat

== Records ==
Prior to this competition, the existing world, Asian and Games records were as follows.

World Record	Sun Yang (CHN)	14:31.02	London, United Kingdom	4 August 2012
Asian Record	Sun Yang (CHN)	14:31.02	London, United Kingdom	4 August 2012
Games Record	Sun Yang (CHN)	14:35.43	Guangzhou, China	18 November 2010

== Results ==
Rank	Heat	Athlete	Time	Notes
1st place, gold medalist(s)	2	Sun Yang (CHN)	14:58.53	
2nd place, silver medalist(s)	2	Nguyễn Huy Hoàng (VIE)	15:01.63	
3rd place, bronze medalist(s)	2	Ji Xinjie (CHN)	15:06.18	
4	2	Shogo Takeda (JPN)	15:17.13	
5	2	Ayatsugu Hirai (JPN)	15:24.26	
6	2	Aflah Fadlan Prawira (INA)	15:24.59	
7	1	Advait Page (IND)	15:29.96	
8	2	Huang Guo-ting (TPE)	15:36.52	
9	1	Cheuk Ming Ho (HKG)	15:38.76	
10	1	Lee Ho-joon (KOR)	15:44.99	
11	1	Glen Lim (SGP)	15:45.04	
12	2	Cho Cheng-chi (TPE)	15:50.94	
13	1	Lam Chak Hang (HKG)	16:11.50	
14	1	Kenessary Kenenbayev️️️️️️️️️️ (KAZ)	17:08.44	
15	1	Mubal Azzam Ibrahim (MDV)	19:26.54	
