= Ji Xinjie =

Chinese swimmer (born 1997)

Personal information
- Nationality: Chinese
- Born: 27 October 1997 (age 28) Yantai, China

Sport
- Sport: Swimming
- Strokes: Freestyle
Medal record
Men's swimming
Representing China
World Championships (LC)
| Gold medal – first place | 2024 Doha | 4×100 m freestyle |
| Gold medal – first place | 2024 Doha | 4×200 m freestyle |
| Gold medal – first place | 2024 Doha | 4×100 m mixed freestyle |
| Silver medal – second place | 2025 Singapore | 4×200 m freestyle |
World Championships (SC)
| Bronze medal – third place | 2018 Hangzhou | 4×200 m freestyle |
Asian Games
| Silver medal – second place | 2018 Jakarta | 4×100 m freestyle |
| Silver medal – second place | 2018 Jakarta | 4×200 m freestyle |
| Bronze medal – third place | 2018 Jakarta | 200 m freestyle |
| Bronze medal – third place | 2018 Jakarta | 1500 m freestyle |
Military World Games
| Gold medal – first place | 2019 Wuhan | 200 m freestyle |
| Gold medal – first place | 2019 Wuhan | 400 m freestyle |
| Gold medal – first place | 2019 Wuhan | 800 m freestyle |
| Gold medal – first place | 2019 Wuhan | 4×200 m freestyle |
| Gold medal – first place | 2019 Wuhan | 4×100 m mixed freestyle |
| Silver medal – second place | 2019 Wuhan | 4×100 m freestyle |
| Bronze medal – third place | 2019 Wuhan | 1500 m freestyle |

Ji Xinjie (Chinese: 季新杰, born 27 October 1997) is a Chinese swimmer. He competed in the men's 200 metre freestyle and 1500 metre freestyle at the 2018 Asian Games, winning bronze medals for both events. He competed in the 4 x 100 metres freestyle and 4 x 200 metres freestyle relays at the 2024 World Aquatics Championships, winning gold medals for both events.

== Personal bests ==
As of 30 July 2021

=== Long course (50-meter pool) ===
| Event | Time | Meet | Date | Note(s) |
|---|---|---|---|---|
| 50 m freestyle | 22.79 | 2020 Chinese National Swimming Championships | 26 September 2020 | |
| 100 m freestyle | 49.16 | 2020 Chinese National Swimming Championships | 30 September 2020 | |
| 200 m freestyle | 1.45.48 | 2019 World Championships | 26 July 2019 | |
| 400 m freestyle | 3.45.64 | 2019 World Championships | 21 July 2019 | |
| 800 m freestyle | 7.52.96 | 2017 National Games of China | 1 September 2017 | |
| 1500 m freestyle | 15.03.38 | 2019 Chinese National Swimming Championships | 31 March 2019 | |

=== Short course (25-meter pool) ===
| Event | Time | Meet | Date | Note(s) |
|---|---|---|---|---|
| 50 m freestyle | 23.38 | 2018 World Championships | 14 December 2018 | |
| 100 m freestyle | 49.34 | 2018 World Championships | 14 December 2018 | |
| 200 m freestyle | 1.42.31 | 2018 World Championships | 12 December 2018 | |
| 400 m freestyle | 3.39.20 | 2017 World Cup | 11 November 2017 | |
| 800 m freestyle | 7.45.42 | 2018 World Cup | 3 November 2018 | |
| 1500 m freestyle | 14.35.13 | 2018 World Cup | 3 November 2018 | |
