= Naito Ehara =

Japanese swimmer (born 1993)

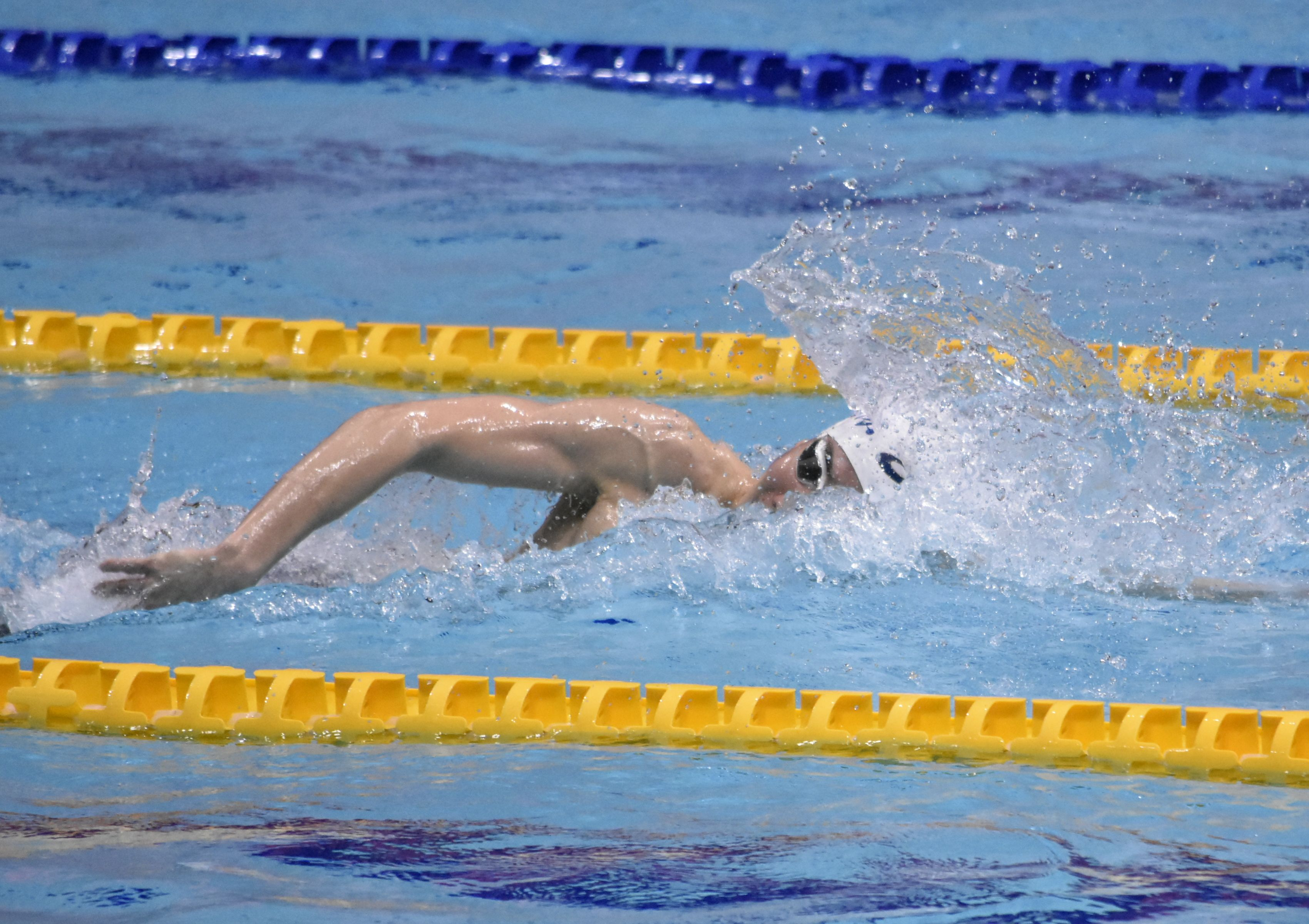
- Naito Ehara in 2020

Personal information
- Full name: 江原 騎士
- Nationality: Japanese
- Born: 30 July 1993 (age 32) Yamanashi Prefecture, Japan
- Height: 172 cm (5 ft 8 in)
- Weight: 59 kg (130 lb)

Sport
- Sport: Swimming
- Club: JSDF Physical Training School
Medal record
Men's swimming
Representing Japan
Olympic Games
Bronze medal – third place	2016 Rio de Janeiro	4×200 m freestyle
Pan Pacific Championships
Bronze medal – third place	2018 Tokyo	4×200 m freestyle
Asian Games
Gold medal – first place	2018 Jakarta	4×200 m freestyle
Silver medal – second place	2018 Jakarta	400 m freestyle

Naito Ehara (江原 騎士, Ehara Naito; born 30 July 1993) is a Japanese competitive swimmer. He competed in the men's 4 × 200 metre freestyle relay at the 2016 Summer Olympics, winning the bronze medal. He also competed in the men's 400 metre freestyle event. Ehara serves in the Japan Ground Self-Defense Force as a sergeant first class.
