= Kevin Yeap =

Malaysian swimmer (born 1989)

Personal information
- Full name: Kevin Yeap Soon Choy
- Born: Kevin Yeap; August 4, 1989 (age 37)

Sport
- Sport: Swimming
- Strokes: Freestyle, open water swimming
Medal record
Swimming
Representing Malaysia
SEA Games
Gold medal – first place	2017 Kuala Lumpur	10km open water
Silver medal – second place	2009 Vientiane	1500m freestyle
Silver medal – second place	2011 Palembang	1500m freestyle
Silver medal – second place	2011 Palembang	4x200m freestyle relay
Silver medal – second place	2013 Naypyidaw	1500m freestyle
Silver medal – second place	2013 Naypyidaw	4x200m freestyle relay
Silver medal – second place	2015 Kallang	4x200m freestyle relay
Bronze medal – third place	2007 Nakhon Ratchasima	4x100m medley relay
Bronze medal – third place	2009 Vientiane	4x100m medley relay
Bronze medal – third place	2015 Kallang	1500m freestyle

Kevin Yeap Soon Choy (born 4 August 1989) is a Malaysian retired swimmer. In the 2010 Commonwealth Games he swam the 1500m freestyle, the 200m freestyle, the 4 × 100 m and the 4 × 200 m relays and the 400m freestyle. He was the gold medalist for Perak in Melaka in 2010. Yeap won a SEA Games gold medal in the 10k open water swimming in Kuala Lumpur in 2017. He announced his retirement after this win.

He is currently the coach of the Perak swimming team.
