= Danny Yeo (swimmer) =

Singaporean swimmer

Personal information
- Full name: Danny Yeo Kai Quan
- Nationality: Singapore
- Born: 1 June 1990 (age 36) Singapore
- Height: 1.82 m (5 ft 11 1/2 in)
- Weight: 70 kg (150 lb)

Sport
- Sport: Swimming
- Strokes: Freestyle, medley
Medal record
Representing Singapore
Event	1st	2nd	3rd
Asian Games	0	0	2
Southeast Asian Games	10	1	2
Total	10	1	4
Asian Games
Bronze medal – third place	2018 Jakarta	4×100 m freestyle
Bronze medal – third place	2018 Jakarta	4×200 m freestyle
Southeast Asian Games
Gold medal – first place	2009 Laos	4×100 m freestyle
Gold medal – first place	2011 Indonesia	200 m freestyle
Gold medal – first place	2011 Indonesia	4×200 m freestyle
Gold medal – first place	2011 Indonesia	4×100 m freestyle
Gold medal – first place	2013 Myanmar	4×200 m freestyle
Gold medal – first place	2013 Myanmar	4×100 m freestyle
Gold medal – first place	2015 Singapore	4×200 m freestyle
Gold medal – first place	2015 Singapore	4×100 m freestyle
Gold medal – first place	2017 Kuala Lumpur	4×100 m freestyle
Gold medal – first place	2017 Kuala Lumpur	4×200 m freestyle
Silver medal – second place	2011 Indonesia	100 m freestyle
Bronze medal – third place	2013 Myanmar	100 m freestyle
Bronze medal – third place	2017 Kuala Lumpur	200 m freestyle

Danny Yeo Kai Quan (born 1 June 1990) is a Singaporean swimmer.

== Career ==
Yeo currently holds the national record in the Long Course (50m) for the 4 × 100 m freestyle relay together with Joseph Schooling, Quah Zheng Wen and Pang Sheng Jun and the 4 × 200 m freestyle relay with Joseph, Quah and Darren Lim.

In the Short Course (25m), he currently holds the national record for the 4×50m freestyle relay together with Dylan Koo, Pang Sheng Jun and Lionel Khoo.

He competes in the 50, 100 and 200 metres freestyle.

== Personal life ==
Yeo's father died when Yeo was 16 but persevered on to become who he is today. He had a thought of retiring in 2015 when he suffered numerous injuries and sickness.
