= Kent Cheung =

Hong Kong swimmer (born 1992)

Personal information
- Born: 24 November 1992 (age 33)

Sport
- Sport: Swimming

Kent Cheung Kin Tat (born 24 November 1992) is a Hong Kong swimmer. He competed in the men's 100 metre freestyle event at the 2017 World Aquatics Championships. In 2018, he represented Hong Kong at the 2018 Asian Games held in Jakarta, Indonesia.
