= 2018 Pan Pacific Swimming Championships – Men's 800 metre freestyle =

Men's 800 metre freestyle at the 2018 Pan Pacific Swimming Championships
- Venue: Tokyo Tatsumi International Swimming Center
- Dates: 12 August (timed finals)
- Competitors: 18 from 8 nations
- Winning time: 7:43.74

Medalists
| gold medal | Zane Grothe | United States |
| silver medal | Jordan Wilimovsky | United States |
| bronze medal | Jack McLoughlin | Australia |

The men's 800 metre freestyle competition at the 2018 Pan Pacific Swimming Championships took place on August 12 at the Tokyo Tatsumi International Swimming Center. The defending champion was Ryan Cochrane of Canada.

This event was a timed-final where each swimmer swam just once. Early heat was swum at the end of the preliminary heats on that day from slowest to fastest. The fastest timed final heat was swum with the finals.

== Records ==
Prior to this competition, the existing world and Pan Pacific records were as follows:

| World record | Zhang Lin (CHN) | 7:32.12 | Rome, Italy | 29 July 2009 |
| Pan Pacific Championships record | Grant Hackett (AUS) | 7:44.78 | Yokohama, Japan | 24 August 2002 |

== Results ==
All times are in minutes and seconds.

| KEY: | CR | Championships record | NR | National record | PB | Personal best | SB | Seasonal best |

The timed final was held on 12 August from 10:00 to the slowest heats and from 17:30 to the fastest heat.

Only two swimmers from each country was classified in the award ranking.

=== Total ranking ===
| Rank | Heat | Name | Nationality | Time | Notes |
|---|---|---|---|---|---|
| 1 | 3 | Zane Grothe | United States | 7:43.74 | CR |
| 2 | 3 | Jordan Wilimovsky | United States | 7:45.19 | |
| 3 | 3 | Jack McLoughlin | Australia | 7:47.31 | |
| 4 | 3 | Guilherme Costa | Brazil | 7:51.67 | |
| 5 | 2 | Robert Finke | United States | 7:52.57 | |
| 6 | 3 | Mack Horton | Australia | 7:53.42 | |
| 7 | 3 | Naito Ehara | Japan | 7:55.02 | |
| 8 | 3 | Shogo Takeda | Japan | 7:56.01 | |
| 9 | 2 | James Brinegar | United States | 7:58.79 | |
| 10 | 2 | Kohei Yamamoto | Japan | 7:59.04 | |
| 11 | 2 | Alex Pratt | Canada | 8:03.12 | |
| 12 | 2 | Jeremy Bagshaw | Canada | 8:03.38 | |
| 13 | 2 | Ayatsugu Hirai | Japan | 8:04.63 | |
| 14 | 3 | Peter Brothers | Canada | 8:05.37 | |
| 15 | 2 | Grant Shoults | United States | 8:09.35 | |
| 16 | 1 | Wesley Roberts | Cook Islands | 8:22.62 | |
| 17 | 1 | Noel Keane | Palau | 9:24.88 | |
| 18 | 1 | Mark Imazu | Guam | 10:07.46 | |

=== Award ranking ===
| Rank | Name | Nationality | Time | Notes |
|---|---|---|---|---|
| 1st place, gold medalist(s) | Zane Grothe | United States | 7:43.74 | CR |
| 2nd place, silver medalist(s) | Jordan Wilimovsky | United States | 7:45.19 | |
| 3rd place, bronze medalist(s) | Jack McLoughlin | Australia | 7:47.31 | |
| 4 | Guilherme Costa | Brazil | 7:51.67 | |
| 5 | Mack Horton | Australia | 7:53.42 | |
| 6 | Naito Ehara | Japan | 7:55.02 | |
| 7 | Shogo Takeda | Japan | 7:56.01 | |
| 8 | Alex Pratt | Canada | 8:03.12 | |
