= 2018 Pan Pacific Swimming Championships – Men's 1500 metre freestyle =

Men's 1500 metre freestyle at the 2018 Pan Pacific Swimming Championships
- Venue: Tokyo Tatsumi International Swimming Center
- Dates: 9 August (timed finals)
- Competitors: 15 from 7 nations
- Winning time: 14:46.93

Medalists
gold medal	Jordan Wilimovsky	United States
silver medal	Zane Grothe	United States
bronze medal	Jack McLoughlin	Australia

The men's 1500 metre freestyle competition at the 2018 Pan Pacific Swimming Championships took place on August 9 at the Tokyo Tatsumi International Swimming Center. The defending champion was Connor Jaeger of United States.

This event was a timed-final where each swimmer swam just once. Early heat was swum at the end of the preliminary heats on that day from slowest to fastest. The fastest timed final heat was swum with the finals.

== Records ==
Prior to this competition, the existing world and Pan Pacific records were as follows:

World record	Sun Yang (CHN)	14:31.02	London, United Kingdom	4 August 2012
Pan Pacific Championships record	Grant Hackett (AUS)	14:41.65	Yokohama, Japan	28 August 2002

== Results ==
All times are in minutes and seconds.

KEY:	CR	Championships record	NR	National record	PB	Personal best	SB	Seasonal best

The timed final was held on 9 August from 10:00 to the slowest heat and from 17:30 to the fastest heat.

Only two swimmers from each country was classified in the award ranking.

=== Total ranking ===
Rank	Heat	Name	Nationality	Time	Notes
1	2	Jordan Wilimovsky	United States	14:46.93	
2	1	Zane Grothe	United States	14:48.40	
3	2	Robert Finke	United States	14:48.70	
4	2	Jack McLoughlin	Australia	14:55.92	
5	2	Guilherme Costa	Brazil	15:03.40	
6	2	Shogo Takeda	Japan	15:05.81	
7	1	Michael Brinegar	United States	15:07.04	
8	2	Eric Hedlin	Canada	15:07.18	
9	1	Kohei Yamamoto	Japan	15:18.71	
10	1	David Heron	United States	15:22.98	
11	2	Ayatsugu Hirai	Japan	15:23.43	
12	1	Taylor Abbott	United States	15:33.64	
13	2	Peter Brothers	Canada	15:41.63	
14	1	Noel Keane	Palau	17:59.30	
15	1	Mark Imazu	Guam	19:35.60	

=== Award ranking ===
Rank	Name	Nationality	Time	Notes
1st place, gold medalist(s)	Jordan Wilimovsky	United States	14:46.93	
2nd place, silver medalist(s)	Zane Grothe	United States	14:48.40	
3rd place, bronze medalist(s)	Jack McLoughlin	Australia	14:55.92	
4	Guilherme Costa	Brazil	15:03.40	
5	Shogo Takeda	Japan	15:05.81	
6	Eric Hedlin	Canada	15:07.18	
7	Kohei Yamamoto	Japan	15:18.71	
8	Peter Brothers	Canada	15:41.63	
