= 2014 Pan Pacific Swimming Championships – Men's 400 metre freestyle =

Athletic competitionz

Men's 400 metre freestyle at the 2014 Pan Pacific Swimming Championships
- Venue: Gold Coast Aquatic Centre
- Dates: August 23, 2014 (heats & finals)
- Competitors: 25
- Winning time: 3:43.15

Medalists
gold medal	Park Tae-hwan	South Korea
silver medal	Kosuke Hagino	Japan
bronze medal	Connor Jaeger	United States

The men's 400 metre freestyle competition at the 2014 Pan Pacific Swimming Championships took place on August 23 at the Gold Coast Aquatic Centre. The last champion was Park Tae-Hwan of South Korea.

This race consisted of eight lengths of the pool, with all eight being in the freestyle stroke.

== Records ==
Prior to this competition, the existing world and Pan Pacific records were as follows:

World record	Paul Biedermann (GER)	3:40.07	Rome, Italy	July 26, 2009
Pan Pacific Championships record	Ian Thorpe (AUS)	3:41.83	Sydney, Australia	August 22, 1999

== Results ==
All times are in minutes and seconds.

KEY:	q	Fastest non-qualifiers	Q	Qualified	CR	Championships record	NR	National record	PB	Personal best	SB	Seasonal best

=== Heats ===
The first round was held on August 23, at 11:11.

Rank	Name	Nationality	Time	Notes
1	Park Tae-hwan	South Korea	3:46.10	QA
2	Connor Jaeger	United States	3:46.20	QA
3	David McKeon	Australia	3:47.81	QA
4	Kosuke Hagino	Japan	3:48.92	QA
5	Mack Horton	Australia	3:49.07	QA
5	Michael McBroom	United States	3:49.07	QA
7	Jordan Harrison	Australia	3:49.66	QA
8	Ryan Cochrane	Canada	3:50.08	QA
9	Matt McLean	United States	3:50.49	QB
10	Yuri Kobori	Japan	3:50.59	QB
11	Kohei Yamamoto	Japan	3:50.88	QB
12	Leonardo de Deus	Brazil	3:51.60	QB
12	Reed Malone	United States	3:51.60	QB
14	Conor Dwyer	United States	3:52.04	QB
15	Michael Weiss	United States	3:52.83	QB
16	Matthew Stanley	New Zealand	3:53.33	QB
17	Dylan Dunlop-Barrett	New Zealand	3:54.05	
18	Ewan Jackson	New Zealand	3:55.34	
19	Ayatsugu Hirai	Japan	3:56.32	
20	Qiu Zi'ao	China	3:57.35	
21	Will Brothers	Canada	3:58.72	
22	Wei Haobo	China	4:02.80	
23	Ma Tianchi	China	4:07.22	
24	Kei Koi Kong	Hong Kong	4:09.72	
25	Kent Cheung	Hong Kong	4:13.50	

=== B Final ===
The B final was held on August 23, at 20:19.

Rank	Name	Nationality	Time	Notes
9	Jordan Harrison	Australia	3:47.75	
10	Matt McLean	United States	3:47.70	
11	Matthew Stanley	New Zealand	3:50.75	
12	Ewan Jackson	New Zealand	3:52.32	
13	Qiu Zi'ao	China	3:52.97	
14	Kohei Yamamoto	Japan	3:53.15	
15	Dylan Dunlop-Barrett	New Zealand	3:53.96	
16	Will Brothers	Canada	3:58.25	

=== A Final ===
The A final was held on August 23, at 20:19.

Rank	Name	Nationality	Time	Notes
1st place, gold medalist(s)	Park Tae-hwan	South Korea	3:43.15	
2nd place, silver medalist(s)	Kosuke Hagino	Japan	3:44.56	
3rd place, bronze medalist(s)	Connor Jaeger	United States	3:45.31	
4	Ryan Cochrane	Canada	3:45.99	
5	Mack Horton	Australia	3:46.19	
6	David McKeon	Australia	3:46.40	
7	Yuri Kobori	Japan	3:49.05	
8	Michael McBroom	United States	3:52.77	
