= 2014 Pan Pacific Swimming Championships – Men's 1500 metre freestyle =

Men's 1500 metre freestyle at the 2014 Pan Pacific Swimming Championships
- Venue: Gold Coast Aquatic Centre
- Dates: August 21, 2014 (heats & finals)
- Competitors: 14
- Winning time: 14:51.79

Medalists
gold medal	Connor Jaeger	United States
silver medal	Ryan Cochrane	Canada
bronze medal	Mack Horton	Australia

The men's 1500 metre freestyle competition at the 2014 Pan Pacific Swimming Championships took place on August 21 at the Gold Coast Aquatic Centre. The last champion was Ryan Cochrane of Canada.

This event was a timed-final where each swimmer swam just once. The top 8 seeded swimmers swam in the evening, and the remaining swimmers swam in the morning session.

== Records ==
Prior to this competition, the existing world and Pan Pacific records were as follows:

World record	Sun Yang (CHN)	14:31.02	London, UK	August 4, 2012
Pan Pacific Championships record	Grant Hackett (AUS)	14:41.65	Yokohama, Japan	August 28, 2002

== Results ==
All times are in minutes and seconds.

KEY:	q	Fastest non-qualifiers	Q	Qualified	CR	Championships record	NR	National record	PB	Personal best	SB	Seasonal best

The first and final round were held on August 21, at 20:25.

Rank	Name	Nationality	Time	Notes
1st place, gold medalist(s)	Connor Jaeger	United States	14:51.79	
2nd place, silver medalist(s)	Ryan Cochrane	Canada	14:51.97	
3rd place, bronze medalist(s)	Mack Horton	Australia	14:52.78	
4	Jordan Harrison	Australia	14:53.65	
5	Michael McBroom	United States	14:57.15	
6	Kohei Yamamoto	Japan	14:57.71	
7	Jordan Wilimovsky	United States	15:01.43	
8	Sean Ryan	United States	15:03.82	
9	Andrew Gemmell	United States	15:11.92	
10	Ayatsugu Hirai	Japan	15:22.70	
11	Jarrod Poort	Australia	15:23.39	
12	Shogo Takeda	Japan	15:25.40	
13	Will Brothers	Canada	15:29.71	
14	Eric Hedlin	Canada	15:32.81	
