= Swimming at the 2009 World Aquatics Championships – Men's 1500 metre freestyle =

Men's 1500 metre freestyle at the 2009 FINA World Championships
- Venue: Foro Italico
- Dates: 1 August 2009 (heats, semifinals); 2 August 2009 (final)
- Competitors: 49 from 35 nations
- Winning time: 14:37.28

Medalists
gold medal	Oussama Mellouli	Tunisia
silver medal	Ryan Cochrane	Canada
bronze medal	Sun Yang	China

The heats for the men's 1500 m freestyle race at the 2009 World Championships took place on the morning of 1 August, with the final in the evening session of 2 August at the Foro Italico in Rome, Italy.

== Records ==
Prior to the competition, the existing world and championship record were as follows:

World record	Grant Hackett (AUS)	14:34.56	Fukuoka, Japan	29 July 2001
Championship record	Grant Hackett (AUS)	14:34.56	Fukuoka, Japan	29 July 2001

== Results ==
=== Heats ===
Rank	Name	Nationality	Time	Heat	Lane	Notes
1	Sun Yang	China	14:54.54	5	3	
2	Oussama Mellouli	Tunisia	14:54.56	5	4	
3	Ryan Cochrane	Canada	14:56.56	4	4	
4	Marco Rivera	Spain	14:57.47	4	7	NR
5	Zhang Lin	China	14:58.46	4	5	
6	Federico Colbertaldo	Italy	14:58.98	3	5	
7	David Davies	United Kingdom	15:00.52	5	5	
8	Samuel Pizzetti	Italy	15:00.70	4	6	
9	Park Tae-Hwan	South Korea	15:00.87	4	3	
10	Mads Glæsner	Denmark	15:01.80	5	6	
11	Ryan Napoleon	Australia	15:09.55	3	6	
12	Jackson Wilcox	United States	15:09.66	5	1	
13	Tom Vangeneugden	Belgium	15:12.95	3	7	
14	Robert Hurley	Australia	15:14.75	3	2	
15	Brennan Morris	United States	15:16.37	3	1	
16	Nicolas Rostoucher	France	15:16.49	3	3	
17	Pál Joensen	Faroe Islands	15:21.37	5	2	
18	Ryoji Sononaka	Japan	15:24.13	4	2	
19	Igor Snitko	Ukraine	15:26.97	4	8	
20	Esteban Paz	Argentina	15:31.45	4	0	NR
21	David Brandl	Austria	15:31.46	5	8	
22	Richard Charlesworth	United Kingdom	15:36.64	5	7	
23	Ricardo Monasterio	Venezuela	15:37.48	3	9	
24	Alejandro Gómez	Venezuela	15:38.93	2	4	
25	Oleksandr Lutchenko	Ukraine	15:39.57	3	8	
26	Pi Seungyeop	South Korea	15:47.94	5	9	
27	Luis Escobar	Mexico	15:52.60	5	0	
28	Daniel Delgadillo	Mexico	15:56.42	3	0	
29	Florian Janistyn	Austria	15:57.96	4	1	
30	Mateo de Angulo	Colombia	16:03.31	2	6	
31	Esteban Enderica	Ecuador	16:07.59	2	7	
32	Mandar Divase	India	16:12.28	1	0	
33	Pan Kai-Wen	Chinese Taipei	16:18.38	4	9	
34	Chien Jui-Ting	Chinese Taipei	16:22.09	2	3	
35	Hajder Ensar	Bosnia and Herzegovina	16:32.01	1	1	
36	Ivan Alejandro Enderica	Ecuador	16:32.83	2	0	
37	Roberto Peñailillo Garcia	Chile	16:38.70	2	1	
38	Luis Andres Martorell Name	Honduras	16:50.12	1	6	
39	Vitalii Khudiakov	Kyrgyzstan	16:50.18	1	4	
40	Aleksandr Slepchenko	Kyrgyzstan	16:52.35	2	9	
41	Allan Gutierrez Castro	Honduras	16:52.71	1	5	
42	Heimanu Sichan	French Polynesia	17:08.44	1	2	NR
43	Paul Elaisa	Fiji	17:58.23	1	7	
–	Omar Núñez	Nicaragua	DNS	1	3	
–	Naser Aldaya	Palestine	DNS	1	8	
–	Ignacio Quevedo Bubba	Bolivia	DNS	1	9	
–	Mohamed Farhoud	Egypt	DNS	2	2	
–	Jan Karel Petric	Slovenia	DNS	2	5	
–	Yury Prilukov	Russia	DNS	3	4	

=== Final ===
Rank	Name	Nationality	Lane	Time	Notes
1st place, gold medalist(s)	Oussama Mellouli	Tunisia	5	14:37.28	AF
2nd place, silver medalist(s)	Ryan Cochrane	Canada	3	14:41.38	
3rd place, bronze medalist(s)	Sun Yang	China	4	14:46.84	
4	Federico Colbertaldo	Italy	7	14:48.28	NR
5	Zhang Lin	China	2	14:54.23	
6	David Davies	United Kingdom	1	14:57.03	
7	Marco Rivera	Spain	6	15:01.92	
8	Samuel Pizzetti	Italy	8	15:19.38	
