= 2018 Pan Pacific Swimming Championships – Men's 400 metre freestyle =

Men's 400 metre freestyle at the 2018 Pan Pacific Swimming Championships
- Venue: Tokyo Tatsumi International Swimming Center
- Dates: 11 August (heats & finals)
- Competitors: 22 from 8 nations
- Winning time: 3:44.20

Medalists
gold medal	Jack McLoughlin	Australia
silver medal	Mack Horton	Australia
bronze medal	Zane Grothe	United States

The men's 400 metre freestyle competition at the 2018 Pan Pacific Swimming Championships took place on August 11 at the Tokyo Tatsumi International Swimming Center. The defending champion was Park Tae-hwan of South Korea.

== Records ==
Prior to this competition, the existing world and Pan Pacific records were as follows:

World record	Paul Biedermann (GER)	3:40.07	Rome, Italy	26 July 2009
Pan Pacific Championships record	Ian Thorpe (AUS)	3:41.83	Sydney, Australia	22 August 1999

== Results ==
All times are in minutes and seconds.

KEY:	QA	Qualified A Final	QB	Qualified B Final	CR	Championships record	NR	National record	PB	Personal best	SB	Seasonal best

=== Heats ===
The first round was held on 11 August from 10:00.

Only two swimmers from each country may advance to the A or B final. If a country not qualify any swimmer to the A final, that same country may qualify up to three swimmers to the B final.

Rank	Name	Nationality	Time	Notes
1	Zane Grothe	United States	3:45.32	QA
2	Jack McLoughlin	Australia	3:45.41	QA
3	Mack Horton	Australia	3:47.75	QA
4	Grant Shoults	United States	3:48.23	QA
5	Conor Dwyer	United States	3:48.60	QB
6	Elijah Winnington	Australia	3:49.27	QB
7	Naito Ehara	Japan	3:50.17	QA
8	Robert Finke	United States	3:51.23	~~QB~~, WD
9	Fernando Scheffer	Brazil	3:51.78	QA
10	Sean Grieshop	United States	3:52.04	QB
11	Shogo Takeda	Japan	3:52.23	QA
12	Tonwley Haas	United States	3:53.36	
13	Wesley Roberts	Cook Islands	3:54.08	QA
14	Kohei Yamamoto	Japan	3:54.84	QB
15	Tristan Cote	Canada	3:54.94	QB
16	Ayatsugu Hirai	Japan	3:55.38	QB
17	Alex Pratt	Canada	3:55.66	QB
18	Peter Brothers	Canada	3:55.80	QB
19	Luiz Altamir Melo	Brazil	3:55.85	
20	Noel Keane	Palau	4:28.21	
21	Mark Imazu	Guam	4:48.01	
–	Jeremy Bagshaw	Canada	DNS	

=== B Final ===
The B final was held on 11 August from 18:00.

Rank	Name	Nationality	Time	Notes
9	Conor Dwyer	United States	3:48.45	
10	Elijah Winnington	Australia	3:48.83	
11	Sean Grieshop	United States	3:51.52	
12	Alex Pratt	Canada	3:51.84	
13	Kohei Yamamoto	Japan	3:52.37	
14	Peter Brothers	Canada	3:54.08	
15	Tristan Cote	Canada	3:54.80	
16	Ayatsugu Hirai	Japan	3:56.05	

=== A Final ===
The A final was held on 11 August from 18:00.

Rank	Name	Nationality	Time	Notes
1st place, gold medalist(s)	Jack McLoughlin	Australia	3:44.20	
2nd place, silver medalist(s)	Mack Horton	Australia	3:44.31	
3rd place, bronze medalist(s)	Zane Grothe	United States	3:45.37	
4	Grant Shoults	United States	3:48.27	
5	Naito Ehara	Japan	3:48.80	
6	Fernando Scheffer	Brazil	3:50.55	
7	Wesley Roberts	Cook Islands	3:54.73	
8	Shogo Takeda	Japan	3:55.30	
