= 2014 Pan Pacific Swimming Championships – Men's 800 metre freestyle =

Men's 800 metre freestyle at the 2014 Pan Pacific Swimming Championships
- Venue: Gold Coast Aquatic Centre
- Dates: August 24, 2014 (heats & finals)
- Competitors: 9
- Winning time: 7:45.39

Medalists
gold medal	Ryan Cochrane	Canada
silver medal	Mack Horton	Australia
bronze medal	Connor Jaeger	United States

The men's 800 metre freestyle competition at the 2014 Pan Pacific Swimming Championships took place on August 24 at the Gold Coast Aquatic Centre. The last champion was Ryan Cochrane of Canada.

This event was a timed-final where each swimmer swam just once. The top 8 seeded swimmers swam in the evening and the remaining swimmers swam in the morning session.

== Records ==
Prior to this competition, the existing world and Pan Pacific records were as follows:

World record	Zhang Lin (CHN)	7:32.12	Rome, Italy	July 29, 2009
Pan Pacific Championships record	Grant Hackett (AUS)	7:44.78	Yokohama, Japan	August 24, 2002

== Results ==
All times are in minutes and seconds.

KEY:	q	Fastest non-qualifiers	Q	Qualified	CR	Championships record	NR	National record	PB	Personal best	SB	Seasonal best

The first and final round were held on August 24, at 19:16.

Rank	Name	Nationality	Time	Notes
1st place, gold medalist(s)	Ryan Cochrane	Canada	7:45.39	
2nd place, silver medalist(s)	Mack Horton	Australia	7:47.73	
3rd place, bronze medalist(s)	Connor Jaeger	United States	7:47.75	
4	Jordan Harrison	Australia	7:48.20	
5	Michael McBroom	United States	7:52.84	
6	Kohei Yamamoto	Japan	7:54.07	
7	Shogo Takeda	Japan	8:01.53	
8	Ayatsugu Hirai	Japan	8:04.23	
9	Will Brothers	Canada	8:06.51	
