= 2014 FINA World Swimming Championships (25 m) – Men's 1500 metre freestyle =

Men's 1500 metre freestyle at the 2014 FINA World Swimming Championships (25 m)
- Dates: 7 December
- Competitors: 49 from 41 nations
- Winning time: 14:16.10

Medalists
gold medal	Gregorio Paltrinieri	Italy
silver medal	Oussama Mellouli	Tunisia
bronze medal	Ryan Cochrane	Canada

The men's 1500 metre freestyle competition of the 2014 FINA World Swimming Championships (25 m) was held on 7 December.

== Records ==
Prior to the competition, the existing world and championship records were as follows.

	Name	Nation	Time	Location	Date
World record	Grant Hackett	Australia	14:10.10	Perth	7 August 2001
Championship record	Yury Prilukov	Russia	14:22.98	Manchester	13 April 2008

The following records were established during the competition:

Date	Event	Name	Nation	Time	Record
7 December	Final	Gregorio Paltrinieri	Italy	14:16.10	CR

== Results ==
=== Final ===
The final was held at 19:36.

Rank	Heat	Lane	Name	Nationality	Time	Notes
1st place, gold medalist(s)	6	7	Gregorio Paltrinieri	Italy	14:16.10	CR
2nd place, silver medalist(s)	6	1	Oussama Mellouli	Tunisia	14:18.79	
3rd place, bronze medalist(s)	6	6	Ryan Cochrane	Canada	14:23.35	
4	6	2	Pál Joensen	Faroe Islands	14:26.54	
5	6	3	Gabriele Detti	Italy	14:29.94	
6	6	4	Jordan Harrison	Australia	14:33.10	
7	4*	1	Michael McBroom	United States	14:34.31	
8	5*	5	Richárd Nagy	Slovakia	14:35.50	
9	4*	6	Qiu Ziao	China	14:39.41	
10	5*	6	Jan Micka	Czech Republic	14:41.54	
11	6	5	Gergely Gyurta	Hungary	14:42.39	
12	4*	3	Kohei Yamamoto	Japan	14:42.55	
13	5*	2	Mads Glæsner	Denmark	14:43.02	
14	5*	7	Shogo Takeda	Japan	14:46.37	
15	4*	4	Vuk Čelić	Serbia	14:48.10	
16	6	8	Serhiy Frolov	Ukraine	14:49.65	
17	5*	4	Florian Vogel	Germany	14:49.68	
18	4*	5	Henrik Christiansen	Norway	14:50.61	
19	5*	3	Nathan Capp	New Zealand	14:50.82	
20	4*	8	Esteban Enderica	Ecuador	14:51.93	
21	4*	0	Martin Bau	Slovenia	14:52.56	
22	5*	8	Dániel Dudás	Hungary	14:53.36	
23	5*	0	Sören Meissner	Germany	14:54.82	
24	5*	1	Michael Klueh	United States	14:54.90	
25	3*	3	Martín Naidich	Argentina	14:54.91	
26	3*	2	Marcelo Acosta	El Salvador	14:54.92	
27	3*	6	Sven Saemundsson	Croatia	15:02.24	
28	3*	0	Cho Cheng-chi	Chinese Taipei	15:09.07	
29	3*	7	Oli Mortensen	Faroe Islands	15:10.09	
30	4*	2	Felix Auboeck	Austria	15:10.25	
31	3*	1	Christoph Meier	Liechtenstein	15:11.38	
32	3*	4	Jan Kutník	Czech Republic	15:12.04	
33	5*	9	Filip Zaborowski	Poland	15:18.42	
34	4*	7	Wei Haobo	China	15:20.21	
35	3*	5	Nezır Karap	Turkey	15:21.28	
36	3*	8	Pedro Pinotes	Angola	15:32.16	
37	2*	2	Pol Dourdet	Andorra	15:45.56	
38	2*	6	Eric Culver	Puerto Rico	15:48.42	
39	2*	3	Khader Baqlah	Jordan	15:48.57	
40	2*	4	Imadeddine Tchouar	Algeria	15:54.72	
41	2*	5	Geoffrey Butler	Cayman Islands	16:03.27	
42	2*	8	Fahad Alkhaldi	Philippines	16:03.72	
43	2*	7	Sanu Debnath	India	16:05.63	
44	3*	9	Jesús Monge	Peru	16:10.92	
45	2*	1	Yousef Allowghani	Kuwait	16:14.99	
46	2*	9	Mark Burnley	Curaçao	16:21.88	
47	2*	0	Arian Oliaei	Iran	16:40.76	
48	1*	5	Ahnt Khaung Htut	Myanmar	17:56.04	
49	1*	4	Tommy Imazu	Guam	18:30.42	
—	4*	9	Ahmed Mathlouthi	Tunisia		DNS

*Raced in slower heats.
