= Swimming at the 2018 Asian Games – Men's 800 metre freestyle =

Men's 800 metre freestyle at the 2018 Asian Games
- Venue: Gelora Bung Karno Aquatic Stadium
- Date: 20 August 2018
- Competitors: 14 from 10 nations

Medalists
gold medal	Sun Yang	China
silver medal	Shogo Takeda	Japan
bronze medal	Nguyễn Huy Hoàng	Vietnam

The men's 800 metre freestyle event at the 2018 Asian Games took place on 20 August at the Gelora Bung Karno Aquatic Stadium.

== Schedule ==
All times are Western Indonesia Time (UTC+07:00)

Date	Time	Event
Monday, 20 August 2018	09:00	Slowest heat
Monday, 20 August 2018	18:00	Fastest heat

== Records ==
Prior to this competition, the existing world, Asian and Games records were as follows.

World Record	Zhang Lin (CHN)	7:32.12	Rome, Italy	29 July 2009
Asian Record	Zhang Lin (CHN)	7:32.12	Rome, Italy	29 July 2009
Games Record	Neo Chwee Kok (SIN)	11:02.20	New Delhi, India	7 March 1951

== Results ==
Rank	Heat	Athlete	Time	Notes
1st place, gold medalist(s)	2	Sun Yang (CHN)	7:48.36	GR
2nd place, silver medalist(s)	2	Shogo Takeda (JPN)	7:53.01	
3rd place, bronze medalist(s)	2	Nguyễn Huy Hoàng (VIE)	7:54.32	
4	2	Kohei Yamamoto (JPN)	7:59.60	
5	2	Ji Xinjie (CHN)	7:59.99	
6	1	Aflah Fadlan Prawira (INA)	8:03.87	
7	1	Cheuk Ming Ho (HKG)	8:07.76	
8	1	Advait Page (IND)	8:09.13	
9	1	Glen Lim (SGP)	8:11.59	
10	2	Huang Guo-ting (TPE)	8:12.15	
11	2	Welson Sim (MAS)	8:12.46	
12	1	Cho Cheng-chi (TPE)	8:16.63	
13	1	Lam Chak Hang (HKG)	8:26.07	
14	1	Mubal Azzam Ibrahim (MDV)	10:12.07	
