= Swimming at the 2009 World Aquatics Championships – Men's 800 metre freestyle =

Men's 800 metre freestyle at the 2009 FINA World Championships
- Venue: Foro Italico
- Dates: 28 July 2009 (heats, semifinals); 29 July 2009 (final)
- Competitors: 56 from 40 nations
- Winning time: 7:32.12 WR

Medalists
gold medal	Zhang Lin	China
silver medal	Oussama Mellouli	Tunisia
bronze medal	Ryan Cochrane	Canada

The men's 800 metre freestyle at the 2009 World Championships occurred on the morning of Tuesday, 28 July (heats) and the evening Wednesday 29 July (final) at the Foro Italico in Rome, Italy.

== Records ==
World record	Grant Hackett (AUS)	7:38.65	Montreal, Canada	27 July 2005
Championship record	Grant Hackett (AUS)	7:38.65	Montreal, Canada	27 July 2005

The following records were established during the competition:

Date	Round	Name	Nationality	Time	Record
29 July	Final	Zhang Lin	China	7:32.12	WR

== Results ==
=== Heats ===
Rank	Name	Nationality	Time	Heat	Lane	Notes
1	Oussama Mellouli	Tunisia	7:41.82	6	5	AF
2	Ryan Cochrane	Canada	7:43.61	6	4	AM
3	Federico Colbertaldo	Italy	7:44.29	4	3	ER
4	David Davies	United Kingdom	7:45.89	4	5	NR
5	Yury Prilukov	Russia	7:46.05	5	4	NR
6	Zhang Lin	China	7:48.75	6	3	
7	Marco Rivera	Spain	7:49.09	6	6	NR
8	Peter Vanderkaay	United States	7:49.71	5	6	
9	Jan Wolfgarten	Germany	7:50.10	5	5	
10	Robert Hurley	Australia	7:50.65	4	6	
11	Mads Glæsner	Denmark	7:52.18	6	7	NR
12	Ryan Napoleon	Australia	7:53.92	5	2	
13	Ahmed Mathlouthi	Tunisia	7:55.43	4	0	
14	Jackson Wilcox	United States	7:57.09	5	8	
15	Tom Vangeneugden	Belgium	7:59.16	6	1	
16	Samuel Pizzetti	Italy	7:59.67	4	4	
17	Richard Charlesworth	United Kingdom	8:00.50	5	1	
18	Pál Joensen	Faroe Islands	8:01.50	6	2	
19	David Brandl	Austria	8:02.35	5	7	
20	Esteban Paz	Argentina	8:03.27	4	1	NR
21	Ryoji Sononaka	Japan	8:05.12	4	8	
22	Kang Yonghwan	South Korea	8:05.68	3	3	
23	Ricardo Monasterio	Venezuela	8:08.64	3	5	
24	Igor Snitko	Ukraine	8:09.16	6	8	
25	Luis Escobar	Mexico	8:10.26	1	1	
26	Fabio Pereira	Portugal	8:11.60	5	0	
27	Florian Janistyn	Austria	8:11.79	4	2	
28	Oleksandr Lutchenko	Ukraine	8:12.36	1	2	
29	Alejandro Gómez	Venezuela	8:13.16	3	2	
30	Mohamed Farhoud	Egypt	8:14.67	6	9	
31	Xin Tong	China	8:16.93	1	7	
32	Irakli Revishvili	Georgia	8:20.55	3	7	
33	Jan Karel Petric	Slovenia	8:20.94	5	9	
34	Mateo de Angulo	Colombia	8:22.12	3	4	
35	Daniel Delgadillo	Mexico	8:25.81	6	0	
36	Pan Kai-Wen	Chinese Taipei	8:29.57	4	9	
37	Lin Kuan-Ting	Chinese Taipei	8:33.44	3	8	
38	Hajder Ensar	Bosnia and Herzegovina	8:35.57	2	9	
39	Ivan Alejandro Enderica	Ecuador	8:36.04	3	1	
40	Pang Sheng Jun	Singapore	8:39.69	2	3	
41	Roberto Peñailillo Garcia	Chile	8:43.89	3	0	
42	Lim Clement	Singapore	8:44.09	2	5	
43	Allan Gabriel Gutierrez Castro	Honduras	8:45.18	2	7	
44	Vitalii Khudiakov	Kyrgyzstan	8:54.03	3	9	
45	Neil Agius	Malta	8:54.06	2	6	
46	Heimanu Sichan	French Polynesia	8:55.64	2	1	NR
47	Ngou Pok Man	Macau	8:56.92	2	2	
48	Omar Núñez	Nicaragua	8:59.14	2	8	
49	Luis Andres Martorell Name	Honduras	8:59.58	2	0	
50	Vincent Perry	French Polynesia	9:11.37	1	4	
51	Cooper Graf	Northern Mariana Islands	9:38.96	1	3	
52	Shin Kimura	Northern Mariana Islands	9:40.57	1	5	
–	Naser Aldaya	Palestine	DNS	1	6	
–	Yamine Jordan	Morocco	DNS	2	4	
–	Sho Uchida	Japan	DNS	4	7	
–	Nicolas Rostoucher	France	DNS	5	3	

=== Final ===
Rank	Name	Nationality	Time	Lane	Notes
1st place, gold medalist(s)	Zhang Lin	China	7:32.12	7	WR
2nd place, silver medalist(s)	Oussama Mellouli	Tunisia	7:35.27	4	AF
3rd place, bronze medalist(s)	Ryan Cochrane	Canada	7:41.92	5	AM
4	Federico Colbertaldo	Italy	7:43.84	3	ER
5	David Davies	United Kingdom	7:44.32	6	NR
6	Peter Vanderkaay	United States	7:48.44	8	
7	Marco Rivera	Spain	7:49.46	1	
7	Yuriy Prilukov	Russia	7:49.46	2	

== See also ==
- Swimming at the 2007 World Aquatics Championships – Men's 800 metre freestyle (previous World Championships)
