= 2010 Pan Pacific Swimming Championships – Men's 1500 metre freestyle =

Men's 1500 metre freestyle at the 2010 Pan Pacific Swimming Championships
- Venue: William Woollett Jr. Aquatics Center
- Dates: August 18, 2010 (heats & finals)
- Competitors: 25 from 10 nations
- Winning time: 14:49.47

Medalists
gold medal	Ryan Cochrane	Canada
silver medal	Chad La Tourette	United States
bronze medal	Zhang Lin	China

The men's 1500 metre freestyle competition at the 2010 Pan Pacific Swimming Championships took place on August 18 at the William Woollett Jr. Aquatics Center. The previous champion was Park Tae-Hwan of South Korea.

This event was a timed-final where each swimmer swam just once. The top 8 seeded swimmers swam in the evening, and the remaining swimmers swam in the morning session.

== Records ==
Prior to this competition, the existing world and Pan Pacific records were as follows:

World record	Grant Hackett (AUS)	14:34.56	Fukuoka, Japan	July 29, 2001
Pan Pacific Championships record	Grant Hackett (AUS)	14:41.65	Yokohama, Japan	August 28, 2002

== Results ==
All times are in minutes and seconds.

KEY:	q	Fastest non-qualifiers	Q	Qualified	CR	Championships record	NR	National record	PB	Personal best	SB	Seasonal best

The first round was held on August 18, at 11:34, and the final was held on August 18, at 18:00.

Rank	Heat	Lane	Name	Nationality	Time	Notes
1st place, gold medalist(s)	4	6	Ryan Cochrane	Canada	14:49.47	
2nd place, silver medalist(s)	4	3	Chad La Tourette	United States	14:54.48	
3rd place, bronze medalist(s)	4	2	Zhang Lin	China	14:58.90	
4	4	1	Sean Ryan	United States	15:06.34	
5	1	6	Andrew Gemmell	United States	15:07.51	
6	1	1	Michael Klueh	United States	15:12.04	
7	1	5	Arthur Frayler	United States	15:12.89	
8	4	5	Park Tae-Hwan	South Korea	15:13.91	
9	1	3	Ryan Napoleon	Australia	15:14.91	
10	4	7	Robert Hurley	Australia	15:16.74	
11	1	4	Mark Randall	South Africa	15:18.95	
12	4	8	Junpei Higashi	Japan	15:19.49	
13	1	2	Yohsuke Miyamoto	Japan	15:20.25	
14	2	3	Sean Penhale	Canada	15:21.50	
15	3	3	Alex Meyer	United States	15:23.64	
16	4	4	Oussama Mellouli	Tunisia	15:24.74	
17	1	7	Luiz Arapiraca	Brazil	15:27.81	
18	1	8	Lucas Kanieski	Brazil	15:28.37	
19	2	5	Kier Maitland	Canada	15:29.93	
20	3	4	Juan Martin Pereyra	Argentina	15:37.30	
21	2	5	Esteban Paz	Argentina	15:39.71	
22	2	5	Aimeson King	Canada	15:53.29	
23	2	6	Jang Sangjin	South Korea	15:53.64	
24	3	5	Richard Weinberger	Canada	16:02.12	
25	2	4	Christopher Ashwood	Australia	16:14.75	
-	2	7	Ahmed Mathlouthi	Tunisia	DNS	
