= Swimming at the 2014 Commonwealth Games – Men's 400 metre freestyle =

Swimming Competition

Men's 400 metre freestyle at the 2014 Commonwealth Games
- Venue: Tollcross International Swimming Centre
- Dates: 24 July 2014
- Competitors: 28 from 18 nations
- Winning time: 3:43.46

Medalists
gold medal	Ryan Cochrane	Canada
silver medal	David McKeon	Australia
bronze medal	James Guy	England

The men's 400 metre freestyle event at the 2014 Commonwealth Games as part of the swimming programme took place on 24 July at the Tollcross International Swimming Centre in Glasgow, Scotland.

The medals were presented by Games ambassador David Carry and the quaichs were presented by Muhammad Khalid Mahmood, Secretary General of the Pakistan Olympic Association.

== Records ==
Prior to this competition, the existing world and Commonwealth Games records were as follows.

World record	Paul Biedermann (GER)	3:40.07	Rome, Italy	26 July 2009
Commonwealth record	Ian Thorpe (AUS)	3:40.08	Manchester, England	30 July 2002
Games record	Ian Thorpe (AUS)	3:40.08	Manchester, England	30 July 2002

== Results ==
=== Heats ===
Rank	Heat	Lane	Name	Nationality	Time	Notes
1	4	4	David McKeon	Australia	3:45.23	Q
2	4	5	Ryan Cochrane	Canada	3:46.62	Q
3	3	7	Stephen Milne	Scotland	3:46.88	Q
4	3	2	Daniel Wallace	Scotland	3:46.96	Q
5	3	3	Robert Renwick	Scotland	3:47.19	Q
6	3	5	James Guy	England	3:47.27	Q
7	3	4	Mack Horton	Australia	3:47.33	Q
8	4	3	Jordan Harrison	Australia	3:47.75	Q
9	4	6	Devon Brown	South Africa	3:48.65	
10	2	5	Daniel Jervis	Wales	3:52.44	
11	4	2	Matthew Stanley	New Zealand	3:52.81	
12	4	7	Dylan Dunlop-Barrett	New Zealand	3:53.35	
13	4	8	Ieuan Lloyd	Wales	3:53.55	
14	2	4	Will Brothers	Canada	3:54.89	
15	3	6	Daniel Fogg	England	3:55.98	
16	4	1	Kevin Yeap	Malaysia	3:56.59	
17	3	8	Danny Yeo	Singapore	3:56.70	
18	3	1	Dylan Carter	Trinidad and Tobago	3:58.41	
19	2	6	Vernon Lee	Malaysia	3:58.50	
20	2	3	Sajan Prakash	India	3:59.29	
21	2	2	Welson Sim	Malaysia	3:59.37	
22	2	1	Geoffrey Butler	Cayman Islands	4:06.78	
23	2	8	Dominic Walter	Jamaica	4:09.53	
24	1	4	Alex Bregazzi	Isle of Man	4:12.59	
25	2	7	Iacovos Hadjiconstantinou	Cyprus	4:14.57	
26	1	5	Brandon Schuster	Samoa	4:23.73	
27	1	3	Israr Hussain	Pakistan	4:31.76	
28	1	6	Tong Li Panuve	Tonga	4:49.35	

=== Final ===
Rank	Lane	Name	Nationality	Time	Notes
1st place, gold medalist(s)	5	Ryan Cochrane	Canada	3:43.46	
2nd place, silver medalist(s)	4	David McKeon	Australia	3:44.09	
3rd place, bronze medalist(s)	7	James Guy	England	3:44.58	
4	1	Mack Horton	Australia	3:44.91	
5	6	Daniel Wallace	Scotland	3:46.11	
6	8	Jordan Harrison	Australia	3:48.09	
7	2	Robert Renwick	Scotland	3:48.81	
8	3	Stephen Milne	Scotland	3:49.90	
