= Catherine Vogt =

American swimming coach

Catherine Kase born Catherine Vogt is an American Swimming coach and former athlete specializing in distance swimming. In 2016 Vogt was named Head Open Water Coach for the United States Olympic Swimming Team. In 2015 she served as Head Open Water Coach for the United States World Championship team. She is assistant head coach at the University of Southern California.

In 2019 she was identified as the open water coach for the American swimming team for the Tokyo Olympics. The three 10 km open water marathon swimmers are Haley Anderson, Ashley Twichell and Jordan Wilimovsky.
