= 2010 Pan Pacific Swimming Championships – Men's 400 metre freestyle =

Men's 400 metre freestyle at the 2010 Pan Pacific Swimming Championships
- Venue: William Woollett Jr. Aquatics Center
- Dates: August 20, 2010 (heats & finals)
- Competitors: 33 from 11 nations
- Winning time: 3:44.73

Medalists
gold medal	Park Tae-Hwan	South Korea
silver medal	Ryan Cochrane	Canada
bronze medal	Zhang Lin	China

The men's 400 metre freestyle competition at the 2010 Pan Pacific Swimming Championships took place on August 20 at the William Woollett Jr. Aquatics Center. The last champion was Park Tae-Hwan of South Korea.

This race consisted of eight lengths of the pool, with all eight being in the freestyle stroke.

== Records ==
Prior to this competition, the existing world and Pan Pacific records were as follows:

World record	Paul Biedermann (GER)	3:40.07	Rome, Italy	July 26, 2009
Pan Pacific Championships record	Ian Thorpe (AUS)	3:41.83	Sydney, Australia	August 22, 1999

== Results ==
All times are in minutes and seconds.

KEY:	q	Fastest non-qualifiers	Q	Qualified	CR	Championships record	NR	National record	PB	Personal best	SB	Seasonal best

=== Heats ===
The first round was held on August 20, at 10:24.

Rank	Heat	Lane	Name	Nationality	Time	Notes
1	5	4	Park Tae-Hwan	South Korea	3:47.58	QA
2	4	4	Zhang Lin	China	3:47.80	QA
3	4	6	Charlie Houchin	United States	3:48.00	QA
4	3	5	Peter Vanderkaay	United States	3:48.39	QA
5	5	6	Michael Klueh	United States	3:48.85	QA
6	3	3	Ryan Napoleon	Australia	3:49.03	QA
7	4	2	Ryan Cochrane	Canada	3:49.69	QA
8	5	3	Takeshi Matsuda	Japan	3:49.89	QA
9	3	4	Robert Hurley	Australia	3:50.02	QB
10	3	6	Chad La Tourette	United States	3:50.61	QB
11	5	2	Junpei Higashi	Japan	3:50.82	QB
12	4	5	Sho Uchida	Japan	3:51.30	QB
13	3	2	Thomas Fraser-Holmes	Australia	3:52.14	QB
14	4	3	Ahmed Mathlouthi	Tunisia	3:53.42	QB
15	2	4	Hassaan Khalik	Canada	3:53.45	QB
16	1	3	Kenrick Monk	Australia	3:53.53	QB
17	3	7	Mark Randall	South Africa	3:53.81	
18	5	5	Jean Basson	South Africa	3:53.90	
19	5	1	Sean Ryan	United States	3:55.87	
20	4	7	Sangjin Jang	South Korea	3:56.27	
21	5	7	Yohsuke Miyamoto	Japan	3:56.62	
22	2	2	Sean Penhale	Canada	3:56.63	
23	2	6	Juan Martin Pereyra	Argentina	3:56.81	
24	3	8	Blake Worsley	Canada	3:57.47	
25	4	8	Kier Maitland	Canada	3:57.48	
26	1	5	George O'Brien	Australia	3:59.39	
27	3	1	Lucas Kanieski	Brazil	3:59.48	
28	2	1	Yonghwan Kang	South Korea	3:59.94	
29	2	3	Sebastian Jahnsen	Peru	4:00.26	
30	4	1	Esteban Paz	Argentina	4:00.36	
31	2	5	Joonmo Bae	South Korea	4:01.90	
32	2	7	Leonardo Fim	Brazil	4:03.74	
33	1	4	Christopher Ashwood	Australia	4:03.80	
-	5	8	Stefan Hirniak	Canada	DNS	

=== B Final ===
The B final was held on August 20, at 18:22.

Rank	Lane	Name	Nationality	Time	Notes
9	4	Michael Klueh	United States	3:50.36	
10	5	Sho Uchida	Japan	3:51.02	
11	6	Ahmed Mathlouthi	Tunisia	3:51.37	
12	1	Jean Basson	South Africa	3:51.38	
13	3	Thomas Fraser-Holmes	Australia	3:51.61	
14	7	Mark Randall	South Africa	3:51.70	
15	8	Sangjin Jang	South Korea	3:55.96	
16	2	Hassaan Khalik	Canada	3:58.15	

=== A Final ===
The A final was held on August 20, at 18:22.

Rank	Lane	Name	Nationality	Time	Notes
1st place, gold medalist(s)	4	Park Tae-Hwan	South Korea	3:44.73	
2nd place, silver medalist(s)	2	Ryan Cochrane	Canada	3:46.78	
3rd place, bronze medalist(s)	5	Zhang Lin	China	3:46.91	
4	6	Peter Vanderkaay	United States	3:47.11	
5	3	Charlie Houchin	United States	3:47.98	
6	7	Takeshi Matsuda	Japan	3:49.10	
7	1	Robert Hurley	Australia	3:49.36	
8	8	Junpei Higashi	Japan	3:51.90	
