= Dave Kelsheimer =

American swimming coach

Dave Paul Kelsheimer is an American swimming coach. In 2015, Kelsheimer was named an assistant open water swimming-coach for the 2016 United States Olympic Swimming Team. He is the head coach and CEO of Team Santa Monica in Santa Monica, California.

He coached Jordan Wilimovsky on to the 2016 US Olympic Swimming Team, and also trained Israeli Olympic swimmer Matan Roditi from September 2019 to March 2020. He coached in the Cayman Islands and Australia prior to coaching in the United States.
