= Zane Grothe =

American swimmer (born 1992)

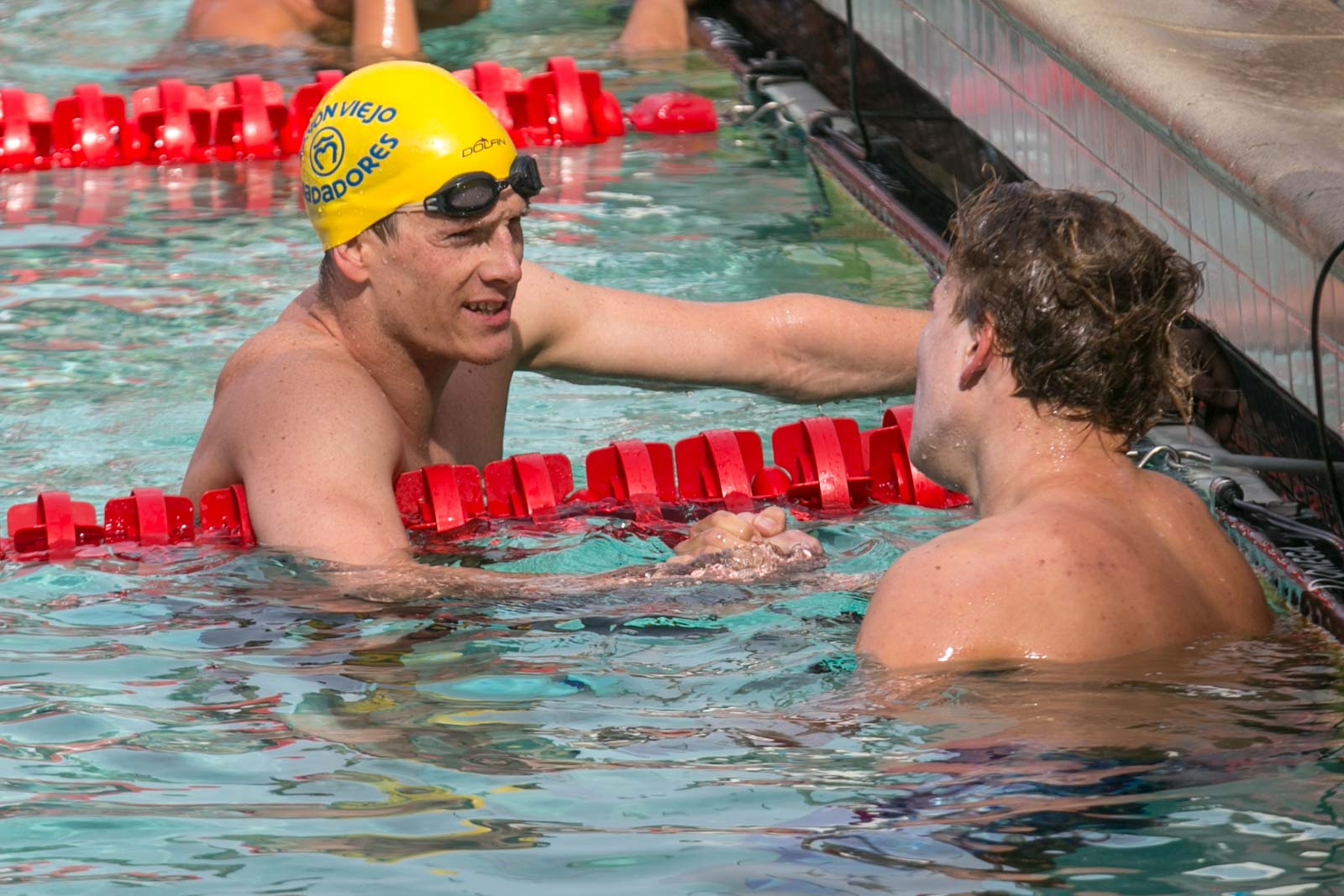
- Grothe in 2018

Personal information
- Born: April 22, 1992 (age 34) Boulder City, Nevada, U.S.
- Height: 6 ft 2.75 in (189.9 cm)

Sport
- Sport: Swimming
- Strokes: Freestyle
- Club: DC Trident; Indiana Swim Club; Boulder City Henderson Swim Club
- College team: Auburn University
Medal record
Representing the United States
World Championships (LC)
Bronze medal – third place	2017 Budapest	4×200 m freestyle
World Championships (SC)
Gold medal – first place	2016 Windsor	4×200 m freestyle
Pan American Games
Silver medal – second place	2023 Santiago	4×200 m freestyle
Pan Pacific Championships
Gold medal – first place	2018 Tokyo	800 m freestyle
Silver medal – second place	2018 Tokyo	1500 m freestyle
Bronze medal – third place	2018 Tokyo	400 m freestyle

Zane Grothe (born April 22, 1992) is an American swimmer who specializes in distance and mid-distance freestyle events. He competed in the men's 400 meter freestyle event at the 2017 World Aquatics Championships. He currently represents the DC Trident which is part of the International Swimming League. He broke the American and U.S. Open records in the 500 yard and 1650 yard freestyle events at the 2017 USA Winter National Championships.

== Early life ==
Zane Grothe was born April 22, 1992, in Boulder City, Nevada, as the son of Terry Grothe and Sy Grothe. Grothe attended Boulder City High School and swam for the Boulder City Henderson club team. In 2010, he finished third in the 500-yard freestyle (4:24.51) at the Southern California Swimming Grand Prix and fourth in the 1,650-yard freestyle at the 2008 USA Swimming Short Course Junior Championships. Grothe swam collegiately at Auburn University from 2010 to 2014.

== College career ==
As a freshman, he finished fourth in the 1650-yard freestyle at SEC Championships. At the 2016 Men's NCAA Division I Championships Grothe finished sixth in the mile, and seventh in the 500-yard freestyle. He also swam the 200-yard freestyle, finishing 17th.

As a sophomore, Grothe won the SEC title as part of the 800-yard freestyle relay. At the 2016 Men's NCAA Division I Championships he placed fourth in the 1,650 and 500-yard freestyle. He contributed to the 12th-place finish in the 800-yard freestyle relay and finished 14th in the 200-yard freestyle.

During his junior year as an Auburn Tiger he won his first individual title in the 1,650-yard freestyle at the 2013 SEC Championships. At the 2016 Men's NCAA Division I Championships he finished seventh in the 500 and 12th in the 200-yard freestyle. He also placed 15th in the mile and was part of the 800-yard freestyle relay that finished 19th.

As a senior, Grothe finished fifth in the 1,650-yard freestyle at the 2014 Men's NCAA Division I Championships. He placed 11th in the 500-yard freestyle and was part of a seventh-place finish in the 800-yard freestyle relay.
