= Swimming at the 2014 Commonwealth Games – Men's 1500 metre freestyle =

Men's 1500 metre freestyle at the 2014 Commonwealth Games
- Venue: Tollcross International Swimming Centre
- Dates: 28 July 2014 (heats); 29 July 2014 (final)
- Competitors: 19 from 10 nations
- Winning time: 14:44.03

Medalists
gold medal	Ryan Cochrane	Canada
silver medal	Mack Horton	Australia
bronze medal	Daniel Jervis	Wales

The men's 1500 metre freestyle event at the 2014 Commonwealth Games as part of the swimming programme took place on 28 and 29 July at the Tollcross International Swimming Centre in Glasgow, Scotland.

The medals were presented by Peter Sirett, Chairman of the Guernsey Commonwealth Games Association and the quaichs were presented by Jon Doig, chief executive officer of Commonwealth Games Scotland.

== Records ==
Prior to this competition, the existing world and Commonwealth Games records were as follows.

World record	Sun Yang (CHN)	14:31.02	London, United Kingdom	4 August 2012
Commonwealth record	Grant Hackett (AUS)	14:34.56	Fukuoka, Japan	29 July 2001
Games record	Kieren Perkins (AUS)	14:41.66	Victoria, Canada	18 August 1994

== Results ==
=== Heats ===
Rank	Heat	Lane	Name	Nationality	Time	Notes
1	3	4	Ryan Cochrane	Canada	15:03.29	Q
2	3	2	Stephen Milne	Scotland	15:03.38	Q
3	2	2	Daniel Jervis	Wales	15:06.60	Q
4	2	4	Mack Horton	Australia	15:08.43	Q
5	3	6	Devon Brown	South Africa	15:10.87	Q
=6	2	5	Daniel Fogg	England	15:10.88	Q
=6	3	5	Jordan Harrison	Australia	15:10.88	Q
8	2	3	Jay Lelliott	England	15:11.89	Q
9	3	3	Matthew Levings	Australia	15:13.53	
10	2	6	Will Brothers	Canada	15:22.92	
11	2	7	Martin Cremin	Scotland	15:27.30	
12	1	3	Max Litchfield	England	15:33.87	
13	3	1	Kevin Yeap	Malaysia	15:35.50	
14	3	7	Craig Hamilton	Scotland	15:35.60	
15	3	8	Vernon Lee	Malaysia	16:10.53	
16	2	8	Geoffrey Butler	Cayman Islands	16:14.39	
17	2	1	Welson Sim	Malaysia	16:18.24	
18	1	4	Iacovos Hadjiconstantinou	Cyprus	16:41:00	
19	1	5	Dominic Walter	Jamaica	16:56.28	

=== Final ===
Rank	Lane	Name	Nationality	Time	Notes
1st place, gold medalist(s)	4	Ryan Cochrane	Canada	14:44.03	
2nd place, silver medalist(s)	6	Mack Horton	Australia	14:48.76	
3rd place, bronze medalist(s)	3	Daniel Jervis	Wales	14:55.33	
4	1	Jordan Harrison	Australia	14:55.71	
5	5	Stephen Milne	Scotland	15:04.90	
6	8	Jay Lelliott	England	15:05.83	
7	7	Daniel Fogg	England	15:13.72	
8	2	Devon Brown	South Africa	15:17.89	
