= Swimming at the 2018 Commonwealth Games – Men's 1500 metre freestyle =

Men's 1500 metre freestyle at the 2018 Commonwealth Games
- Venue: Gold Coast Aquatic Centre
- Dates: 10 April
- Competitors: 8 from 7 nations
- Winning time: 14:47.09

Medalists
gold medal	Jack McLoughlin	Australia
silver medal	Daniel Jervis	Wales
bronze medal	Mack Horton	Australia

The men's 1500 metre freestyle event at the 2018 Commonwealth Games was held on 10 April at the Gold Coast Aquatic Centre.

== Records ==
Prior to this competition, the existing world, Commonwealth and Games records were as follows:

Record	Time	Athlete (nation)	Meet	Location	Date	Ref
World record	14:31.02	Sun Yang (CHN)		London, England	4 August 2012	
Commonwealth record	14:34.56	Grant Hackett (AUS)		Fukuoka, Japan	29 July 2001	
Games record	14:41.66	Kieren Perkins (AUS)		Victoria, Canada	24 August 1994	

== Results ==
There are no heats so there will only be a final for this event.

Rank	Lane	Name	Nationality	Time	Notes
1st place, gold medalist(s)	3	Jack McLoughlin	Australia	14:47.09	
2nd place, silver medalist(s)	5	Daniel Jervis	Wales	14:48.67	
3rd place, bronze medalist(s)	4	Mack Horton	Australia	14:51.05	
4	6	Brent Szurdoki	South Africa	15:28.60	
5	2	Welson Sim	Malaysia	15:31.14	
6	7	Wesley Roberts	Cook Islands	15:40.36	
7	1	Sajan Prakash	India	15:52.84	
8	8	Constantinos Hadjittooulis	Cyprus	16:26.93	
