= Randy Bennett (swimming coach) =

Canadian swimming coach

Biographical details
- Born: November 11, 1963; Red Lake, Ontario
- Died: April 27, 2015 (aged 51); Victoria, B.C.

Coaching career (HC unless noted)
- 1982–1985: Asst. Fort McMurray SC; Fort McMurray, AB; Head coach Don Wilson
- 1985–1989: Asst. Edmonton Keyano SC; Edmonton, AB
- 1989–1993: Port Alberni Tsunami SC; Port Alberni, BC
- 1993–2002: Asst, U. British Columbia; U. of B.C. Dolphins; Head coach Tom Johnson; Vancouver, BC
- 2002–2012: Director, Victoria Amateur SC; Victoria, BC
- 2009-2015: Canadian National Team

Accomplishments and honors

Awards
- Coach of the Year 2008-2012 (Swimming Canada); BC Swimming Hall of Fame - 2018

Randy Bennett (November 11, 1963 – April 27, 2015) was a Canadian swimming coach who grew in his skills assisting at the University of British Columbia from 1993-2002 under Coach Tom Johnson. From 2009 until his death in 2015 he was the coach of the Canadian National Swim Team and was the Head Coach at the 2012 Summer Olympics where his protege Ryan Cochrane won his second Olympic medal.

Bennett was born on Nov. 11, 1953, in Red Lake, Ontario to David and Trudy Bennett. He and his family later moved to Fort Nelson, B.C., where he worked as a lifeguard in the summers. As the town lacked an indoor swimming facility, Bennett had little opportunity to train for a competitive swimming career.

== Coaching assignments ==
Beginning at only 18, his first assistant coaching job was as an 18-year-old in Fort McMurray, Alberta under Head Coach Don Wilson who roomed with Bennett, and soon noted his assistant's knack for learning and applying the many skills needed to coach effectively. In an unlikely scenario, Bennett had no competitive swimming experience but developed quickly under Wilson who noted his willingness to learn despite a prior lack of experience. He later coached at the Olympian Swim Club in Edmonton, Alberta.

From 1985–1989, he was an Asst. Coach at the Edmonton Keyano SC in Edmonton. From 1989-1993, he coached the Port Alberni Tsunami Swim Club in Port Alberni, BC.

In a significant coaching tenure, he spent nine years coaching the Dolphins at the University of British Columbia from 1993-2002 while being mentored under Head Coach Tom Johnson. Beginning in 2002, he coached Victoria's Island Swimming through 2008 where he became known as a hard-driving coach who demanded long yardage and demanding training sets. Bennett stayed in touch with early mentor Don Wilson, and networked with other Canadian coaches on swimming technique and the best methods to coach the 1,500 meter event. At the Victoria Club, he first encountered future 2008-2012 Olympian Ryan Cochrane, who would capture two medals in the 1500 meter freestyle. His coaching relationship with Bennett spanned ten years. Beginning in 2009, Bennett coached all of Canada's elite senior teams at each major international competition, as he was the Canadian National Team Coach from 2009-2015.

== Outstanding swimmers ==
During his long coaching tenure, Bennet mentored several prominent Canadian athletes including World and Olympic medalists including Julia Wilkinson, who began receiving training from Bennett around 2009 in Victoria after her participation in the 2008 Beijing Olympics. Among distance specialists, Bennett coached Richard Weinberger, a 2008 Olympic participant who swam the 10K Marathon event, and Eric Hedlin a 2013 5K Silver medalist at the World Championships. He coached 2016 backstroke bronze medalist Hilary Caldwell who moved to Victoria to begin training with Bennett in 2009. Other Olympians included Stephanie Horner, a 2008 and 2012 Canadian Olympic participant, and Marianne Limpert, a 1996 Atlanta Medley silver medalist. He also mentored Blake Worsley and Olympic medalist Ryan Cochran.

As Bennett was responsible for the development of many elite swimmers, and several Olympians, his coaching philosophy stressed honesty, and the importance of clear and frank communication with his swimmers, as he frequently had a need to point out areas of improvement. He applied the same approach to his novice swimmers.

After suffering from a melanoma, Bennett died on April 27, 2015 at only 51. His wife, Lesley survived him, as well as two teenage sons.

== International coaching highlights ==
- Coach, 1999 / 2006 / 2010 Pan Pacific Championship Coach
- Coach, 1998 & 2006 Commonwealth Games
- Coach, 2000 & 2008 Olympic Games
- Coach, 2001 & 2007 FINA World Championships
- Coach, 2003 Pan American Games
- Head Coach, 2009 FINA World Championships
- Head Coach, 2010 Commonwealth Games
- Head Coach, 2011 FINA World Championships
- Head Coach, 2012 Olympic Games
- Head Coach, 2013 FINA World Championships

== Club positions ==
- 1982–1985 Assistant Coach, Fort McMurray Swim Club – Fort McMurray, AB
- 1985–1989 Assistant Coach, Edmonton Keyano Swim Club – Edmonton, AB
- 1989–1993 Head Coach, Port Alberni Tsunami Swim Team – Port Alberni, BC
- 1993–2002 Assistant Head Coach, UBC Dolphins – Vancouver, BC
- 2002–2008 Head Coach, Victoria Amateur Swim Club – Victoria, BC
- 2002–2012 Director, Island Swimming Association – Victoria, BC

== Coaching honours ==
- Swimming Canada Coach of the Year Award (male swimmer) – 2008, 2009, 2010, 2011, 2012, 2013, 2014
- Swimming Canada Coach of the Year Award (female swimmer) – 2013
- Aquatics Federation of Canada - Coach of the Year – 2011
- Chevrolet High Performance Coach Grant Recipient – 2010
- Jeno Tihanyi Bursary – 2008
- Petro-Canada coaching Excellence Award Winner – 2008, 2007, 2008, 2009 ,2010, 2011, 2012, 2013, 2014
- Swimming Canada Distance Freestyler of the Year – Ryan Cochrane 2007, 2008, 2009, 2010, 2011, 2012, 2013, 2014
- Male Junior Swimmer of the Year – Ryan Cochrane 2006, 2007
- British Columbia Swim Coaches Association BCSCA - Junior Coach of the Year – 2003, 2005
- British Columbia Swim Coaches Association BCSCA - International Coach of the year – 2008, 2010, 2011, 2012, 2013, 2014
- British Columbia Swim Coaches Association BCSCA - National Coach of the Year - 2013, 2014, 2015
- British Columbia Swim Coaches Association BCSCA - Open Water Coach - 2013
- Sport BC Male Coach of the Year – 2016
- Governor General Award – 2012
- Greater Victoria Sports Hall of Fame Induction – Randy Bennett
- BC Swimming Hall of Fame - 2018
