= 2010 Pan Pacific Swimming Championships – Men's 800 metre freestyle =

Men's 800 metre freestyle at the 2010 Pan Pacific Swimming Championships
- Venue: William Woollett Jr. Aquatics Center
- Dates: August 21, 2010 (heats & finals)
- Competitors: 22 from 9 nations
- Winning time: 7:48.71

Medalists
gold medal	Ryan Cochrane	Canada
silver medal	Chad La Tourette	United States
bronze medal	Takeshi Matsuda	Japan

The men's 800 metre freestyle competition at the 2010 Pan Pacific Swimming Championships took place on August 21 at the William Woollett Jr. Aquatics Center. The last champion was Andrew Hurd of Canada.

This event was a timed-final where each swimmer swam just once. The top 8 seeded swimmers swam in the evening, and the remaining swimmers swam in the morning session.

== Records ==
Prior to this competition, the existing world and Pan Pacific records were as follows:

World record	Zhang Lin (CHN)	7:32.12	Rome, Italy	July 29, 2009
Pan Pacific Championships record	Grant Hackett (AUS)	7:44.78	Yokohama, Japan	August 24, 2002

== Results ==
All times are in minutes and seconds.

KEY:	q	Fastest non-qualifiers	Q	Qualified	CR	Championships record	NR	National record	PB	Personal best	SB	Seasonal best

The first round was held on August 21, at 11:37, and the final was held on August 21, at 16:59.

Rank	Heat	Lane	Name	Nationality	Time	Notes
1st place, gold medalist(s)	4	3	Ryan Cochrane	Canada	7:48.71	
2nd place, silver medalist(s)	4	6	Chad La Tourette	United States	7:51.62	
3rd place, bronze medalist(s)	4	4	Takeshi Matsuda	Japan	7:51.87	
4	4	5	Robert Hurley	Australia	7:52.71	
5	4	7	Peter Vanderkaay	United States	7:54.10	
6	2	6	Charlie Houchin	United States	7:55.98	
7	1	5	Junpei Higashi	Japan	7:58.73	
8	1	6	Arthur Frayler	United States	7:59.77	
9	1	7	Michael Klueh	United States	8:01.57	
10	2	4	Mark Randall	South Africa	8:01.91	
11	4	2	Yohsuke Miyamoto	Japan	8:01.96	
12	4	1	Lucas Kanieski	Brazil	8:07.68	
13	1	3	Kier Maitland	Canada	8:07.84	
14	2	3	Sean Penhale	Canada	8:08.46	
15	2	2	Juan Martin Pereyra	Argentina	8:09.98	
16	3	4	Blake Worsley	Canada	8:10.11	
17	2	5	Esteban Paz	Argentina	8:12.52	
18	3	3	George O'Brien	Australia	8:15.28	
19	4	8	Kang Yong-Hwan	South Korea	8:15.57	
20	1	4	Luiz Arapiraca	Brazil	8:17.17	
21	3	5	Esteban Enderica	Ecuador	8:25.11	
22	2	7	Leonardo Fim	Brazil	8:27.36	
