= Swimming at the 2006 Asian Games – Men's 1500 metre freestyle =

Men's 1500 metre freestyle at the 2006 Asian Games
- Venue: Hamad Aquatic Centre
- Date: 7 December 2006
- Competitors: 15 from 12 nations

Medalists
gold medal	Park Tae-hwan	South Korea
silver medal	Zhang Lin	China
bronze medal	Takeshi Matsuda	Japan

The men's 1500m freestyle swimming event at the 2006 Asian Games was held on December 7, 2006, at the Hamad Aquatic Centre in Doha, Qatar. This was a timed-final event, meaning that each swimmer only swam once, with the fastest eight (8) entrants swimming in the finals.

== Schedule ==
All times are Arabia Standard Time (UTC+03:00)

Date	Time	Event
Thursday, 7 December 2006	10:49	Final 1
Thursday, 7 December 2006	18:41	Final 2

== Records ==
Prior to this competition, the existing world, Asian and Games records were as follows.

World Record	Grant Hackett (AUS)	14:34.56	Fukuoka, Japan	29 July 2001
Asian Record	Zhang Lin (CHN)	15:00.27	Macau	2 November 2005
Games Record	Yu Cheng (CHN)	15:10.99	Busan, South Korea	4 October 2002

== Results ==
Legend

- DNS — Did not start

Rank	Heat	Athlete	Time	Notes
1st place, gold medalist(s)	2	Park Tae-hwan (KOR)	14:55.03	AR
2nd place, silver medalist(s)	2	Zhang Lin (CHN)	15:03.13	
3rd place, bronze medalist(s)	2	Takeshi Matsuda (JPN)	15:17.18	
4	2	Kang Yong-hwan (KOR)	15:23.53	
5	2	Kenichi Doki (JPN)	15:29.07	
6	2	Zhang Enjian (CHN)	15:35.35	
7	2	Tharnawat Thanakornworakiart (THA)	16:03.88	
8	1	Marcus Cheah (SIN)	16:04.33	
9	1	Naeem Al-Masri (SYR)	16:08.68	
10	1	Ryan Arabejo (PHI)	16:09.10	
11	2	Nawaf Al-Wazan (KUW)	16:18.65	
12	1	Tang Sheng-chieh (TPE)	16:31.72	
13	1	Timur Kartabaev (KGZ)	18:02.12	
—	1	Mohammad Bidarian (IRI)	DNS	
—	1	Anas Abu Yousuf (QAT)	DNS	
