= Mack Horton =

Australian swimmer (born 1996)

Mack Horton OAM
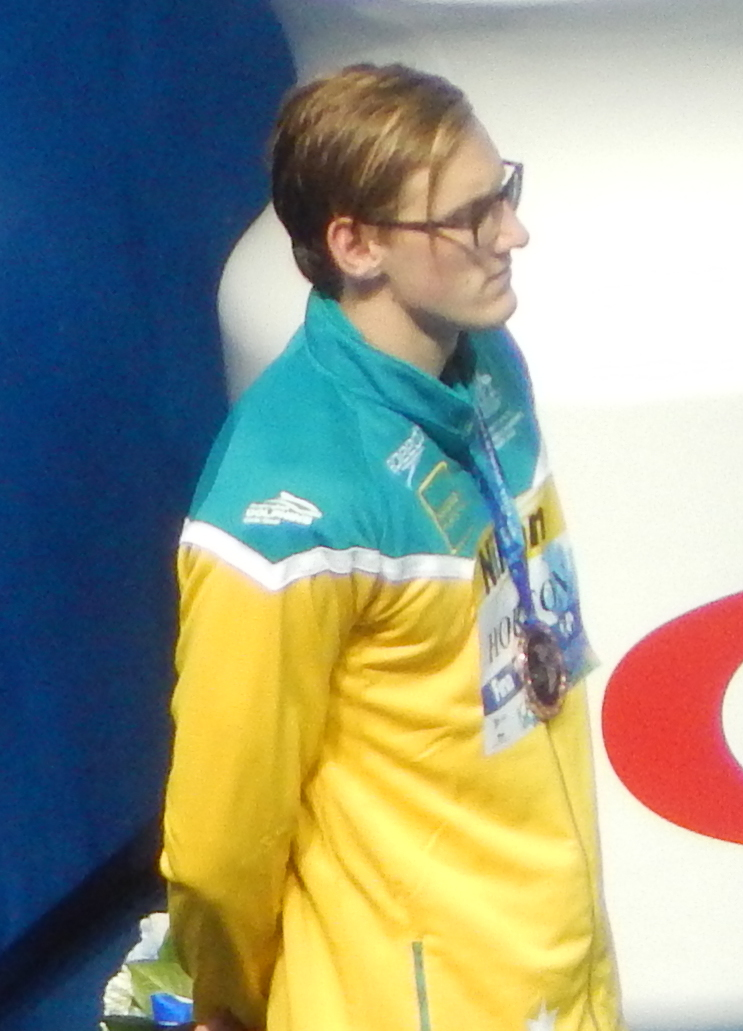
- Horton at the 2015 World Championships

Personal information
- Full name: Mackenzie James Horton
- Nickname: Mack the Knife
- National team: Australia
- Born: 25 April 1996 (age 30) Melbourne, Victoria, Australia
- Height: 1.90 m (6 ft 3 in)
- Weight: 88 kg (194 lb)

Sport
- Sport: Swimming
- Strokes: Freestyle
- Club: Griffith University
- Coach: Michael Bohl
Medal record
Event	1st	2nd	3rd
Olympic Games	1	0	1
World Championships (LC)	1	3	2
World Championships (SC)	0	1	0
Pan Pacific Championships	0	2	2
Commonwealth Games	4	2	2
Total	6	8	7
Men's swimming
Representing Australia
Olympic Games
Gold medal – first place	2016 Rio de Janeiro	400 m freestyle
Bronze medal – third place	2020 Tokyo	4×200 m freestyle
World Championships (LC)
Gold medal – first place	2019 Gwangju	4×200 m freestyle
Silver medal – second place	2017 Budapest	400 m freestyle
Silver medal – second place	2019 Gwangju	400 m freestyle
Silver medal – second place	2022 Budapest	4×200 m freestyle
Bronze medal – third place	2015 Kazan	800 m freestyle
Bronze medal – third place	2017 Budapest	1500 m freestyle
World Championships (SC)
Silver medal – second place	2022 Melbourne	4×200 m freestyle
Pan Pacific Championships
Silver medal – second place	2014 Gold Coast	800 m freestyle
Silver medal – second place	2018 Tokyo	400 m freestyle
Bronze medal – third place	2014 Gold Coast	1500 m freestyle
Bronze medal – third place	2014 Gold Coast	4×200 m freestyle
Commonwealth Games
Gold medal – first place	2014 Glasgow	4×200 m freestyle
Gold medal – first place	2018 Gold Coast	400 m freestyle
Gold medal – first place	2018 Gold Coast	4×200 m freestyle
Gold medal – first place	2022 Birmingham	4×200 m freestyle
Silver medal – second place	2014 Glasgow	1500 m freestyle
Silver medal – second place	2018 Gold Coast	200 m freestyle
Bronze medal – third place	2018 Gold Coast	1500 m freestyle
Bronze medal – third place	2022 Birmingham	400 m freestyle
World Junior Championships
Gold medal – first place	2013 Dubai	200 m freestyle
Gold medal – first place	2013 Dubai	400 m freestyle
Gold medal – first place	2013 Dubai	800 m freestyle
Gold medal – first place	2013 Dubai	1500 m freestyle
Gold medal – first place	2013 Dubai	4×100 m freestyle
Silver medal – second place	2013 Dubai	4×200 m freestyle
Junior Pan Pacific Championships
Gold medal – first place	2012 Honolulu	1500 m freestyle
Silver medal – second place	2012 Honolulu	400 m freestyle

Mackenzie James Horton OAM (born 25 April 1996) is an Australian retired freestyle swimmer. He is an Olympic gold medallist, World Championships gold medallist, and 4-time Commonwealth Games gold medallist. At the 2016 Olympic Games in Rio de Janeiro, Brazil, he took the gold in the 400m freestyle, and became the first male swimmer from the state of Victoria to win an Olympic swimming gold in the Games' history.

== Career ==
=== 2012–2013 ===
Horton first represented Australia at the 2012 Junior Pan Pacific Swimming Championships in Honolulu at the Veterans Memorial Aquatic Center, where he won gold in the 1500 metre freestyle in a championship record time of 15:10.07. At the same meet, he finished second in the 400-metre freestyle and 4th in the 800-metre freestyle. He also placed fourth in the 4×200-metre freestyle relay with a final time of 7:27.90, tenth in the preliminaries of the 200-metre freestyle with a 1:51.83, and twenty-first in the 100-metre freestyle with a 51.79.

Two months later at the final leg of the 2012 World Cup in Singapore, Horton won the 1500 metre freestyle event in 14:54.25.

At the 2013 Australian Youth Olympic Festival, Horton won gold in the 1500 metre freestyle event.

Eight months later at the 2013 World Junior Championships in Dubai, Horton won five gold medals and a silver. He took out the 200 m, 400 m, 800 m and 1500 m freestyle events and alongside Luke Percy, Regan Leong and Blake Jones won the 4 × 100 m freestyle relay all in new Championships record times. The team of Horton, Leong, Isaac Jones and Jack McLoughlin finished second behind the British in the 4 × 200 m freestyle relay event.

=== 2014–2016 ===
Horton qualified for his first senior team at the 2014 Australian Swimming Championships where he won the 1500 metre freestyle in 14:51.55 and finished second behind David McKeon in the 400-metre freestyle in 3:44.60, setting two new junior world records. Horton also finished 5th in the 200-metre freestyle in 1:47.36 which also set a new junior world record.

At the 2014 Commonwealth Games in Glasgow, Horton won the silver medal in the 1500 metre freestyle in new junior world record time of 14:48.76 and narrowly missed the podium in the 400-metre freestyle finishing in fourth place in 3:44.91. In the 4 × 200-metre freestyle relay event, Horton alongside Thomas Fraser-Holmes, David McKeon and Ned McKendry finished as the fastest qualifies with Horton swimming the anchor leg in 1:49.17. In the final, Horton was replaced by Cameron McEvoy and they went on to win the gold in a new games record time of 7:07.38.

"It feels like all my hard work has paid off and being able to back up with two big competitions this year has given me more confidence for the future and I'm really excited to see how far I can go."

— Mack Horton, 24 August 2014

Three weeks later at the 2014 Pan Pacific Swimming Championships in Gold Coast, Australia, Horton won the silver medal in the 800-metre freestyle in 7.47.73, the bronze medal in the 1500 metre freestyle in 14:52.78 and with McKeon, McEvoy and Fraser-Holmes won bronze in the 4 × 200-metre freestyle relay in 7:08.55.

In April 2014, Horton became an ambassador for Horton's Heroes Water Polo team (SHWP) with the swimwear brand Speedo and in August 2014, after his breakthrough performances he was named the winner of the Georgina Hope Foundation Rising Star of the Australian Swim Team.

For his first long course World Championships, the 2015 World Aquatics Championships held in August with swimming competition at Ak Bars Arena in Kazan, Russia, Horton won his first world medal in the 800 metre freestyle, finishing third with a time of 7:44.02 that was less than five seconds behind gold medalist Sun Yang of China and silver medalist Gregorio Paltrinieri of Italy to win the bronze medal.

At the 2016 Summer Olympics, Horton represented Australia in the 400 m freestyle, in which he won gold, and the 4 × 200 metre freestyle relay, in which he finished 4th with his teammates. He finished 5th in the final of the 1500 m freestyle.

=== 2019–2021 ===
At the 2019 World Aquatics Championships, Horton won silver in the 400 m freestyle event where he came runner up to Sun Yang. In a controversial "stand-off" Horton refused to shake the hand of Sun or to stand on the winners' podium. Horton had previously called Sun a "drug cheat". On 28 February 2020, Sun was issued an 8-year ban by the Court of Arbitration for Sport (CAS) for tampering with the doping control process, with calls to reissue medals from affected events, though the CAS clarified that Sun would not be stripped of any of his medals because "doping tests performed on [Sun] shortly before and after the aborted doping control in September 2018 were negative" and "in the absence of any evidence that [Sun] may have engaged in doping activity ... the results achieved by [Sun] in the period prior to the CAS award being issued should not be disqualified." Horton has been criticised for remaining silent on Australian swimmers who have faced punishments for violating anti-doping rules. Horton later competed in the 4 × 200 m freestyle relay. Swimming the anchor leg, he dove in with the lead and split 1:44.85, which was the fastest split in the field. Australia won the gold medal in a time of 7:00.85, which was a new Australian record, surpassing the previous mark of 7:01.65 from 2009.

At the 2021 Australian Swimming Trials, Horton came third in the qualification final for the 400m freestyle, failing to qualify behind Elijah Winnington and Jack McLoughlin. Horton would also make it to the final for the 200m freestyle and would come sixth, earning him selection for the 2020 Olympics in the squad for the Men's 4 × 200 m freestyle relay.

=== 2022 ===
The following year, Horton won the silver medal in the 400-metre freestyle, with a 3:44.06, and the bronze medal in the 200-metre freestyle, with a 1:46.70, at the 2022 Australian Swimming Championships, held in May in Adelaide, and qualified to represent Australia at the 2022 World Aquatics Championships and in swimming competition at the 2022 Commonwealth Games.

A little over three months later, Horton qualified for and was named to the Australia roster for the 2022 World Short Course Championships, to be held in December following the Championships relocation from the Palace of Water Sports in Kazan to his hometown of Melbourne, based on his performances in August at the 2022 Australian Short Course Swimming Championships. Day three of the 2022 World Short Course Championships, contested at Melbourne Sports and Aquatic Centre, he ranked fourth in the preliminaries of the 400 metre freestyle with a time of 3:38.09 and qualified for the evening final. Dropping to a 3:37.94 in the final, he placed sixth. The following day, he won a silver medal as part of the finals relay in the 4×200 metre freestyle relay, splitting a 1:43.19 for the fourth leg of the relay to help set new Oceanian, Commonwealth, and Australian records in the event with finals relay teammates Thomas Neill, Kyle Chalmers, and Flynn Southam in a time of 6:46.54. In the inaugural men's 800 metre freestyle at a World Short Course Championships, the following day, he placed ninth overall with a time of 7:40.64.

=== 2023 ===
At the 2023 Australian Swimming Championships in April, Horton advanced to the final of the 400-metre freestyle on day one with a time of 3:54.31 in the preliminaries, then finished 0.05 seconds behind sixth-place finisher Joshua Staples in the final to place seventh. He followed up with a placing of fifth in the 800-metre freestyle on day three in 8:08.31. He improved to a third-place finish in the 400-metre freestyle at the 2023 Australian Swimming Trials in June, finishing in a time of 3:46.71 in the final.

=== 2024 ===
On the 21 January 2024, Horton announced his retirement from swimming just 6 months before the 2024 Paris Olympic Games.

== International championships (50 m) ==
Meet	100 freestyle	200 freestyle	400 freestyle	800 freestyle	1500 freestyle	4×100 freestyle	4×200 freestyle	4×100 mixed freestyle
Junior level
PACJ 2012	21st	10th (h)	2nd place, silver medalist(s)	4th	1st place, gold medalist(s)		4th	—N/a
WJC 2013		1st place, gold medalist(s)	1st place, gold medalist(s)	1st place, gold medalist(s)	1st place, gold medalist(s)	1st place, gold medalist(s)	2nd place, silver medalist(s)	2nd (h)
Senior level
CG 2014			4th	—N/a	2nd place, silver medalist(s)		(gold) ^{[a]}	—N/a
PAC 2014			5th	2nd place, silver medalist(s)	3rd place, bronze medalist(s)		3rd place, bronze medalist(s)	—N/a
WC 2015			11th	3rd place, bronze medalist(s)	11th			
OG 2016			1st place, gold medalist(s)	—N/a	5th		4th	—N/a
WC 2017		11th	2nd place, silver medalist(s)	DNS	3rd place, bronze medalist(s)		4th	
CG 2018		2nd place, silver medalist(s)	1st place, gold medalist(s)	—N/a	3rd place, bronze medalist(s)		1st place, gold medalist(s)	—N/a
PAC 2018		11th	2nd place, silver medalist(s)	6th				—N/a
WC 2019			2nd place, silver medalist(s)	14th			1st place, gold medalist(s)	
OG 2020							(bronze) ^{[a]}	—N/a
WC 2022			9th				2nd place, silver medalist(s)	
CG 2022		4th	3rd place, bronze medalist(s)	—N/a			1st place, gold medalist(s)	

^{a} Horton swam only in the preliminaries.

== International championships (25 m) ==
Meet	400 freestyle	800 freestyle	4×200 freestyle
WC 2022	6th	9th	2nd place, silver medalist(s)

== Career-best times ==
Event	Time	Record	Meet
Long course
200 m freestyle	1:45.89		2018 Commonwealth Games
400 m freestyle	3:41.55		2016 Summer Olympics
800 m freestyle	7:44.02		2015 World Aquatics Championships
1500 m freestyle	14:39.54		2016 Australian Championships

== Personal life ==
On 16 September 2023, Horton married his high school sweetheart Ella Walter, a nurse. They had been dating since 2015 and got engaged in January 2022. In one of the interviews, Horton described Walter as "the secret to his swimming success".

In 2019, both Horton and Walter became subjects of online abuse and death threats from fans of Chinese swimmer Sun Yang after Horton staged a podium protest at the world swimming titles in South Korea and refused to shake hands with Sun pointing out that he was unhappy that Sun had been allowed to compete at the world titles ahead of a Court of Arbitration for Sport hearing to decide his fate in a long-running doping allegations scandal.

== See also ==
- List of Commonwealth Games medallists in swimming (men)
- List of Caulfield Grammar School people
