= Daniel Jervis =

British swimmer

Personal information
- Full name: Daniel Owen Jervis
- Nationality: British (Welsh)
- Born: 9 June 1996 (age 30) Resolven, Neath, Wales
- Height: 1.85 m (6 ft 1 in)
- Weight: 74 kg (163 lb)

Sport
- Sport: Swimming
- Strokes: freestyle
- Club: Swansea Aquatics
- College team: Swansea University
Medal record
Men's swimming
Representing Great Britain
European Junior Championships
Gold medal – first place	2014 Dordrecht	1500 m freestyle
Bronze medal – third place	2014 Dordrecht	4x200 m freestyle relay
Representing Wales
Commonwealth Games
Silver medal – second place	2018 Gold Coast	1500 m freestyle
Bronze medal – third place	2014 Glasgow	1500 m freestyle

Daniel Owen Jervis (born 9 June 1996) is a British swimmer who competed at the 2020 Summer Olympics and 2024 Summer Olympics.

== Career ==
Jervis started his international career claiming bronze at the 2014 Commonwealth Games while representing Wales. In 2016, he represented Great Britain at the European Championships in London.

Jervis competed in the men's 1500 metre freestyle event at the 2017 World Aquatics Championships. At the 2018 Commonwealth Games, competing for Wales, he won the silver medal in the men's 1500 metre freestyle event.

In 2023 he won the two gold medals at the 2023 British Swimming Championships in the 800 metres freestyle and the 1500 metres freestyle. It was the third time he had won the 800 metres event and the fifth consecutive time that he had won the 1500 metres event.

After winning the 1500 metres freestyle for the sixth time, at the 2024 Aquatics GB Swimming Championships, Jervis sealed his place at the 2024 Summer Olympics. At the 2024 Olympic Games in Paris, he participated in the men's 1500 metre freestyle competition, where he was eliminated in the heats.

In 2025, Jervis announced his retirement from swimming.

== Personal life ==
In 2014 he became an evangelical Christian and was baptized at the Sardis Baptist Church in Resolven.

In 2022 Jervis came out as gay. He is a devout Christian.
