= Jack McLoughlin =

Australian swimmer (born 1995)

Personal information
- Full name: Jack Alan McLoughlin
- Nickname: Jacky-Boy
- Nationality: Australian
- Born: 1 February 1995 (age 31) South Brisbane, Queensland, Australia
- Height: 1.83 m (6 ft 0 in)
- Weight: 75 kg (165 lb)

Sport
- Sport: Swimming
- Strokes: Freestyle
Medal record
Men's swimming
Representing Australia
Silver medal – second place	2020 Tokyo	400 m freestyle
World Championships (LC)
Gold medal – first place	2019 Gwangju	4×200 m freestyle
Commonwealth Games
Gold medal – first place	2018 Gold Coast	1500 m freestyle
Silver medal – second place	2018 Gold Coast	400 m freestyle
Pan Pacific Championships
Gold medal – first place	2018 Tokyo	400 m freestyle
Bronze medal – third place	2018 Tokyo	1500 m freestyle
Bronze medal – third place	2018 Tokyo	800 m freestyle

Jack Alan McLoughlin (born 1 February 1995) is a retired Australian swimmer. He competed in the men's 1500 metre freestyle event at the 2016 Summer Olympics. At the 2018 Commonwealth Games McLoughlin won a gold medal in the same event and silver in the 400 metre freestyle. In the Autumn of 2019, he was a member of the inaugural International Swimming League swimming for the New York Breakers, who competed in the Americas Division.

McLoughlin won silver in the 400 metre freestyle at the 2020 Olympic Games in Tokyo. He was beaten into second place by 0.16 of a second.

== Career ==
McLoughlin was only 18 years old when he competed at the 2013 Australian Youth Olympic Festival, winning gold in the 4 × 200 m freestyle relay. He was placed fourth in the 1500 metre freestyle and 400 metre freestyle events. McLoughlin then competed in the 1500 metre freestyle at the Olympic Games in Rio de Janeiro, Brazil. At the 2017 World Championships in Budapest, Hungary, McLoughlin competed in marathon and freestyle swimming. For marathon, he placed twenty-third for the five kilometre and fourth for the five kilometre team relay.

At the 2018 Pan-Pacific Championships in Tokyo, Japan, McLoughlin competed in the 400 metre, 800 metre, and 1,500 metre freestyle events; he finished first in the 400 metre freestyle (3:44.20), third in the 800 metre freestyle (7:47.31), and fourth in the 1,500 metre freestyle (14:44.92). At the 2019 World Championships in Gwangju, Korea, McLoughlin competed in the 400 metre, 800 metre, 1,500 metre, and 4x200 metre freestyle events. He finished sixth in the 400 metre freestyle (3:45.19), fourth in the 800 metre freestyle (7:42.64), and first in the 4x200 metre freestyle.
