= Tom Vangeneugden =

Belgian swimmer

Personal information
- Full name: Tom Vangeneugden
- Nationality: Belgium
- Born: 31 January 1983 (age 43) Overpelt

Sport
- Sport: Swimming
- Strokes: Freestyle
- Club: Brabo

Tom Vangeneugden (born 31 January 1983) is a Belgian swimmer.

He was born in Overpelt and currently resides in Overijse. He holds the 1500m freestyle long course national record.

Personal bests
| Event | Long course | Short course |
|---|---|---|
| 800 m freestyle | 8:03.27 | 7:51.43 |
| 1500 m freestyle | 15:11.04 (NR) | 14:45.73 |
(NR) – National record
