= Ryan Cochrane (swimmer) =

Canadian swimmer (born 1988)

- Cochrane in Kazan, Russia 2015

Personal information
- Full name: Ryan Andrew Cochrane
- National team: Canada
- Born: October 29, 1988 (age 37) Victoria, British Columbia
- Occupation: Real Estate Agent
- Height: 1.92 m (6 ft 4 in)
- Weight: 80 kg (176 lb)

Sport
- Sport: Swimming
- Strokes: Freestyle, Distance
- Club: Island Swimming
- College team: University of Victoria (2014)
- Coach: Randy Bennett (Island Swimming) (Can. National Team)
Medal record
Men's swimming
Representing Canada
Event	1st	2nd	3rd
Olympic Games	0	1	1
World Championships (LC)	0	4	4
World Championships (SC)	0	0	1
Pan Pacific Championships	3	2	1
Commonwealth Games	4	0	0
Pan American Games	2	0	1
Total	9	7	8
Olympic Games
Silver medal – second place	2012 London	1500 m freestyle
Bronze medal – third place	2008 Beijing	1500 m freestyle
World Championships (LC)
Silver medal – second place	2009 Rome	1500 m freestyle
Silver medal – second place	2011 Shanghai	800 m freestyle
Silver medal – second place	2011 Shanghai	1500 m freestyle
Silver medal – second place	2013 Barcelona	1500 m freestyle
Bronze medal – third place	2009 Rome	800 m freestyle
Bronze medal – third place	2013 Barcelona	800 m freestyle
Bronze medal – third place	2015 Kazan	400 m freestyle
Bronze medal – third place	2015 Kazan	1500 m freestyle
World Championships (SC)
Bronze medal – third place	2014 Doha	1500 m freestyle
Pan Pacific Championships
Gold medal – first place	2010 Irvine	1500 m freestyle
Gold medal – first place	2010 Irvine	800 m freestyle
Gold medal – first place	2014 Gold Coast	800 m freestyle
Silver medal – second place	2010 Irvine	400 m freestyle
Silver medal – second place	2014 Gold Coast	1500 m freestyle
Bronze medal – third place	2006 Victoria	800 m freestyle
Commonwealth Games
Gold medal – first place	2010 Delhi	400 m freestyle
Gold medal – first place	2010 Delhi	1500 m freestyle
Gold medal – first place	2014 Glasgow	400 m freestyle
Gold medal – first place	2014 Glasgow	1500 m freestyle
Pan American Games
Gold medal – first place	2015 Toronto	400 m freestyle
Gold medal – first place	2015 Toronto	1500 m freestyle
Bronze medal – third place	2015 Toronto	4×200 m freestyle

Ryan Andrew Cochrane (born October 29, 1988) is a retired Canadian competitive swimmer who competed for the University of Victoria and specialised in freestyle distance events. He was an Olympic silver and bronze medallist as well as a triple gold medallist in the Pan Pacific Swimming Championships. He was a four-time Commonwealth Games gold medalist and champion in the 400-metre and 1,500-metre having won both events in 2010 and 2014. He holds six world championship medals in the 800-metre and 1500-metre events, making him Canada's all-time leading medalist for swimmers at the World Aquatics Championships. He won gold medals in the 400 and 1,500 m freestyle at the 2015 Pan American Games in Toronto, as well as a bronze in the 4 x 200 m freestyle at the 2015 Games. After retiring from competitive swimming in 2017, he would pursue a career in Real Estate.

== Early life and swimming ==
Cochrane was born October 29, 1988 to John and Donna Cochrane in Victoria, British Columbia and attended Claremont Secondary School in Greater Victoria, graduating in Spring, 2006. His twin brother Devon also competed as a swimmer in his youth, and usually outperformed Ryan in athletics. As a youngster, Cochrane participated in soccer, basketball, track and swimming, but was not considered an exceptional athlete.

=== Island swimming club ===
He greatly improved his swimming technique, endurance, and speed, when at fourteen he started training with Victoria's Island Swimming Club, a highly competitive program under Head Coach Randy Bennett. Bennett continued as his primary coach when Cochrane joined Canada's National team. Cochrane's training with Benett ended in 2015, when Bennett died and was succeeded as a primary Canadian National team coach by Ryan Mallette. Through much of his high school and University career, Cochrane trained with the Island Swimming Club primarily at the Saanich Commonwealth Place pool, a premier facility that had a 25 meter lap pool, a 50 meter competition pool, and an extensive weight room. He would train on and off at the Saanich Commonwealth facility for close to twenty years of his swimming career, as it would also serve for a period as the Canadian National Swimming Center. Cochrane's Claremont Secondary School was part of Claremont Sports Institute and Claremont Aquatics, which was in partnership with the Island Swimming Club, where Cochrane did most of his High School era training.

Distinguishing himself as a sixteen-year-old, Cochrane competed at the 2005 Canada Games for British Columbia, where he won five medals including two gold in the 800- and 1,500-metre freestyle events.

=== University of Victoria ===
After High School, Cochrane attended the University of Victoria, where he began to compete with their swim team around the 2010-2011 season. He graduated in 2014 with a degree in Psychology as well as a focus on finance. While swimming for the University of Victoria in February 2010 during the 2010–2011 Canadian Interuniversity Sport (CIS) Championship in Calgary, as a first year student, Cochrane won gold medals in the 200m freestyle, the 400m freestyle with a 3:48.3, and the 1500m freestyle with a 15:03.47. He also won a bronze in the 400-meter Individual Medley. Cochrane's performance helped lead U. Victoria to a fifth place team finish in the national interscholastic competition. He was subsequently named the BlackBerry Canadian Interuniversity Sport (CIS) male athlete of the week. Dr. Peter Vizsolyi was Victoria University's Head Swimming Coach during Cochrane's swimming tenure with the team. Vizsolyi would coach 10 Canadian Olympic swimmers during his long coaching career with the University, though Cochrane likely received his more intensive training and technique development from Randy Bennett, his Island Swimming Head Coach.

== 2008 Beijing Olympics ==
Still somewhat unknown internationally, Cochrane rose to prominence both in the Canadian and international aquatic world when he competed in the 2008 Summer Olympics in Beijing, China, starting in the 400 m freestyle. There he finished ninth in the heats with a Canadian record time of 3:44.85 and failed to qualify for the final. Cochrane also competed in the 1500 m freestyle where he briefly held the Olympic record after swimming a time of 14:40.84 in the heats. This record was soon broken by previous record holder Grant Hackett, who swam a time of 14:38.92. He qualified in second position overall in his preliminary heats for the final, and won the bronze medal in the final on August 17 with a time of 14:42.60. An historic achievement for the Canadian team, his bronze was the first Olympic medal for a Canadian swimmer since the 1996 Summer Olympics, and was the first medal for Canada in the 1500m freestyle in 88 years.

== 2012 London Olympics ==
The 2012 Summer Olympics in London began with Cochrane competing on the first day of competition in the 400-metre freestyle. There Cochrane won his heat and qualified in the last spot for the final. After Park Tae-hwan, who originally had placed ahead of Cochrane, had his disqualification overturned, Cochrane was pushed out of the final, having missed qualifying for it by 1/100 of a second.

Cochrane subsequently entered his signature event, the 1500-metre where he qualified with a third place overall in the heats. In a close finish for second place in the 1500 final, Cochrane managed to outswim third place bronze medal winner Oussama Mellouli by around .6 seconds, and took the silver medal, swimming a personal best time of 14:39.63. China's Sun Yang had been the favorite to win the 1500, and took the lead early, never relinquishing it, claiming the gold medal with a time of 14:31.02. With his second medal at his second consecutive Olympics, CBC and other media viewed Cochrane as Canada's foundation upon which to build its future achievements at the Olympics and on the international stage. Cochrane declared that he would continue to compete, and would try and swim for Canada at the 2016 Summer Olympics in Rio de Janeiro.

== 2016 Rio de Janeiro Olympics ==
He competed for Canada's Olympic team at the 2016 Summer Olympics in Rio de Janeiro and was made co-captain of the Canadian team. These were to be Cochrane's last Olympic Games, though they would end in disappointment when he missed the final of the 400 m with a time of 3:45.83 and finished sixth in the finals of the 1,500 m freestyle event with a time of 14:49.61.

== Non-Olympic international competition ==
=== 2009 World Aquatics ===
Cochrane was able to back up his performance from the 2008 Olympics at the 2009 World Aquatics Championships. There he swam to a bronze in the 800-metre freestyle and a silver in his best event the 1500-metre freestyle.

=== 2010 Commonwealth Games ===
At the 2010 Commonwealth Games in Delhi, India, Cochrane won Canada's first gold medal of those games in the 400-metre freestyle during the first day of competition. Cochrane also became the first Canadian man in 72 years to win gold in the 400-metre freestyle at the Commonwealth Games. He then went on to win another gold medal at those games, this time in the 1500-metre freestyle.

=== 2011 World Aquatics Championships ===
Cochrane next competed at the 2011 World Aquatics Championships where he opened up with a fifth-place finish in the 400-metre freestyle. Next up was one of his medal hopeful events in the 800-metre freestyle where he lowered his Canadian record to 7:41.86. However this was only good enough for second, as despite staying close to the hometown favourite of Shanghai Sun Yang ultimately took the gold for China. Of the silver medal Cochrane said that "The goal was to win but I'm happy to progress from the last two years. It shows that I'm in it. I have a little more work to do to catch Sun Yang but I'm not out of it by any means."

=== 2011 World Aquatics Championships ===
He next competed in the 1500-metre freestyle in 2011 World Aquatics Championships in Shanghai where he again finished second behind Sun who swam to a world record time. Of a second finish behind Sun, Cochrane could only say that "He shows that he's had that much more base-work training and he can get to that world record, which is fantastic. I think it's great, especially for the distance events because everyone's been talking about this world record year after year and there's more pressure that's built up...He's showed amazing stroke and amazing ability."

=== Surpassing Hayden's medal tally at 2013 World Championships ===
The post-London Olympics period saw Cochrane's first real test arrive at the 2013 World Aquatics Championships in Barcelona. He swam in the 400-metre and posted the second fastest time in qualifying, earning him one of the centre lane spots beside Sun. However, he finished fourth in the finals, unable to beat the American and Japanese swimmers. In the 800-metre freestyle, with Sun again far ahead, there was a four-way race for second through fifth. This time, Cochrane achieved a bronze medal (his fifth medal), tying the Canadian record held at the time by Brent Hayden.

Cochrane would later break Hayden's medal record in the 1500-metre race. In this event, he avoided the three and four-way races that he had found himself in the shorter events, taking a different approach that pitted him against Sun. Cochrane and Sun repeatedly took the lead from each other, culminating in Sun pulling ahead in the final 100 metres and took the gold. Although he established a new Canadian record, Cochrane still said that hoped to progress further, saying "This week was filled with ups and downs. I had expectations of myself that weren't met earlier on but I was pretty proud of my races later in the week so I'm going to take that going forward. Just to get on the podium twice is fantastic but I think I have that many more dreams of being that much better next time."

=== 2014 Commonwealth Games ===
Glasgow, Scotland, was the location for the 2014 Commonwealth Games where Cochrane looked to defend both of his titles in the 400-metre and 1500-metre events. Cochrane won the 400-metre freestyle by half a second. After a tie at 1200 metre in the 1500-metre freestyle, Cochrane was able to successfully defend his title by a safe margin with a time of 14 minutes, 44.03 seconds. The meet marked his fourth Commonwealth games gold medal. He noted later that as this was one of his last major meets and last competitions, he made a conscious effort to push through the pain to win both events.

=== 2015 World Aquatics Championships ===
Swimming in the 400 m freestyle at the 2015 World Aquatics Championships Cochrane surprised with a bronze medal in what was not ordinarily his best event. Next in the 800 m freestyle, he failed to qualify for the final in the event when seven swimmers swam the highly competitive time of 7:50. Afterwards he noted, "The distance events are getting faster and faster. The heats felt more like a semifinal. I thought I did enough to get into the final and I'm obviously disappointed." Despite this poor result Cochrane did follow up with another bronze in his preferred 1,500 m event, the last major event till the 2016 Summer Olympics.

=== Retirement from competitive swimming ===
On March 21, 2017, Ryan announced his retirement from competitive swimming during his "Player's Own Voice" segment on CBC Sports.

Today though, I'm announcing my retirement from competitive swimming, starting a new chapter in my life and looking to find something that will provide me with new purpose and goals to chase.

— Ryan Cochrane, CBC Sports

=== Post swimming careers ===
After his swimming retirement around 2017, and receiving a Certification in Project Management from Stanford University, Cochrane practiced Real Estate, serving with The Agency Real Estate company, while residing in his hometown of Victoria, B.C. To stay connected with his University, he volunteered on the U Victora Alumni Association board. He has also served with the organization Act Now BC, an initiative intended to promote Olympic values and the value of an active lifestyle to elementary school students.

== Honors ==
His 2009 success at the World Aquatics Championship led to his being named the Omega Swimmer of the Year. Despite his Canadian upbringing, he was voted American swimmer of the year in 2014 by Swimming World Magazine.

In 2017, Cochrane's achievements were more widely recognized by Swimming Canada who admitted him into their Circle of Excellence. In 2018, he was inducted into the British Columbia Hall of Fame. Between the years 2008 - 2015, Cochrane was named the Canadian male swimmer of the year, winning the award in eight successive years. He was inducted into the Claremont Secondary School Wall of Fame in 2012, partly to commemorate the Schools long association with the Saanich Commonwealth Place swimming and athletic facility.

== Personal bests and records held ==
Long course (50 m)

Event	Time		Date	Meet	Location	Ref
200 m freestyle	1:48.55		2009	World Championships Trials	Montreal, Canada	
400 m freestyle	3:43.46	NR	24 July 2014	2014 Commonwealth Games	Glasgow, Great Britain	
800 m freestyle	7:41.86	NR	27 July 2011	2011 World Aquatics Championships	Shanghai, China	
1500 m freestyle	14:39.63	NR	5 August 2012	2012 Olympic Games	London, Great Britain	

Short course (25 m)

Event	Time		Date	Meet	Location	Ref
200 m freestyle	1:47.60		2009	Spring Nationals	Toronto, Canada	
400 m freestyle	3:39.10	NR	2009	British Gran Prix	Leeds, United Kingdom	
800 m freestyle	7:38.44	NR	7 December 2014	World Championships	Doha, Qatar	
1500 m freestyle	14:23.35	NR	7 December 2014	World Championships	Doha, Qatar	

Legend: WR – World record; ER – European record; CR – Commonwealth record; NR – Canadian record;
Records not set in finals: h – heat; sf – semifinal; r – relay 1st leg; rh – relay heat 1st leg; b – B final; † – en route to final mark; so – swim-off; tt – time trial

== See also ==
- List of Commonwealth Games medallists in swimming (men)
- List of Olympic medalists in swimming (men)

Awards
Preceded by Ryan Lochte	American Swimmer of the Year; 2014 (with Tyler Clary)	Succeeded by Michael Phelps
