= Jordan Wilimovsky =

American swimmer

Personal information
- Full name: Jordan Matthew Wilimovsky
- National team: United States
- Born: April 22, 1994 (age 32) Malibu, California, U.S.
- Height: 5 ft 10 in (178 cm)
- Weight: 160 lb (73 kg)

Sport
- Sport: Swimming
- Strokes: Freestyle
- Club: Team Santa Monica
- College team: Northwestern University
Medal record
Men's swimming
Representing the United States
World Championships (LC)
Gold medal – first place	2015 Kazan	10 km open water
Silver medal – second place	2017 Budapest	10 km open water
Silver medal – second place	2017 Budapest	Team event
Bronze medal – third place	2019 Gwangju	Team event
Pan Pacific Championships
Gold medal – first place	2018 Tokyo	10 km open water
Gold medal – first place	2018 Tokyo	1500 m freestyle
Silver medal – second place	2018 Tokyo	800 m freestyle
Representing the Northwestern Wildcats
NCAA Championships
Bronze medal – third place	2015 Iowa City	1650 y freestyle

Jordan Matthew Wilimovsky (born April 22, 1994) is an American competitive swimmer who specializes in open water swimming. At the 2015 World Championships in Kazan, Russia, Wilimovsky won the gold medal in the 10 km open water event. Wilimovsky won by a margin of 12.1 seconds over the second-place finisher Ferry Weertman of the Netherlands. At the 2016 Summer Olympics, Wilimovsky competed in both pool swimming and open water swimming events, becoming the first American to swim in both types of events at one Olympic Games.

== Early life and education ==
Wilimovsky was born April 22, 1994, in Malibu, California. At age 9, Wilimovsky failed a swim test required for attendance in a lifeguard camp, which inspired him to become a professional swimmer.

He attended Malibu High School for high school, graduating in 2012.

Wilimovsky attended Northwestern University, where he swam for the Northwestern Wildcats swimming and diving team in National Collegiate Athletic Association (NCAA) and Big Ten Conference competition. His coach at Team Santa Monica is Dave Kelsheimer.

== Career ==
=== 2016 Summer Olympics ===
In swimming at the 2016 Summer Olympics, Wilimovsky finished 4th in the men's 1500 m freestyle and 5th in the men's 10 km open water. His swims made him the first American swimmer to qualify, and compete, in both pool and open water swimming events in one Olympic Games.

=== 2019 World Aquatics Championships ===
At the 2019 World Aquatics Championships in Gwangju, South Korea Wilimovsky placed fifth in the 10 kilometer open water swim with a time of 1:48:01.0. This swim qualified Wilimovsky to compete in the 2020 Summer Olympics in the marathon 10 kilometer swim, and he became the first man to qualify for the US Olympic Team for the 2020 Olympic Games.

In the 5 kilometer mixed team relay event, Wilimovsky won the bronze medal, finished in third place, with fellow United States relay teammates Haley Anderson, Ashley Twichell, and Michael Brinegar in a total relay time of 53:59.0.

=== 2021 ===
==== 2020 US Olympic Trials ====
Wilimovsky competed in two individual events at the 2020 USA Swimming Olympic Trials postponed to June 2021 due to the COVID-19 pandemic, the 800 meter freestyle and the 1500 meter freestyle. In the 800 meter freestyle he placed fourth in the final with a time of 7:53.07 and did not qualify for the US Olympic Team in the event. During the prelims of the 1500 meter freestyle, Wilimovsky swam a 15:14.67, finishing third overall and advancing to the final. At the final Wilimovsky finished third with a time of 15:05.29 and did not qualify for the 2020 Summer Olympics in the event.

==== 2020 Summer Olympics ====
Wilimovsky was the only male American swimmer to qualify to swim the 10 kilometer marathon open water swim at the 2020 Summer Olympics in Tokyo, Japan. It was the only event, men's or women's, in swimming at the 2020 Olympics that the United States did not qualify a second swimmer in.

On August 5, Wilimovsky swam the 10 kilometer marathon swim in a time of 1:51:40.2, which placed him 10th overall.

== Awards ==
- SwimSwam Top 100 (Men's): 2021 (#86)

== See also ==
- List of Northwestern University alumni
