= Jackson Wilcox =

American swimmer (born 1989)

Personal information
- Nationality: United States
- Born: August 16, 1989 (age 36) Memphis, Tennessee, U.S.
- Height: 6 ft 4 in (1.93 m)

Sport
- Sport: Swimming
- Strokes: Freestyle
- Club: Longhorn Aquatics
- College team: University of Texas

Jackson Wilcox (born August 16, 1989) is an American swimmer.

== Career ==
At the 2009 US National Championships and World Championship Trials, Wilcox won the 1500 m freestyle with a time of 15:11.98, earning a place to compete at the 2009 World Aquatics Championships in Rome. Wilcox finished 14th in the 800 m freestyle (7:57.09) and 12th in the 1500 m freestyle (15:09.66) in Rome.

== Personal bests (long course) ==
Event	Time	Date
800 m freestyle	7:57.09	July 2009
1500 m freestyle	15:09.66	July 2009
