= Kier Maitland =

Canadian swimmer (born 1988)

Personal information
- Full name: Nelson Kier Maitland
- Nationality: Canada
- Born: November 16, 1988 (age 37) Edmonton, Alberta
- Height: 1.75 m (5 ft 9 in)
- Weight: 70 kg (150 lb)

Sport
- Sport: Swimming
- Strokes: Freestyle
- Club: Edmonton Keyano
- College team: University of Nevada, Las Vegas
Medal record
Men's swimming
Pan American Games
Bronze medal – third place	2007 Rio de Janeiro	1500m freestyle

Kier Maitland (born November 16, 1988, in Edmonton, Alberta) is a male swimmer from Canada, who mostly competes in the distance freestyle events. Maitland is the son of Craig and Karen Maitland and has an older brother named Logan.

== Club swimming career ==
Kier currently swims for the Edmonton Keyano Swim Club in Edmonton, Alberta during the summer under the coach Steve Price. Kier earned rookie of the year award at the 2005 World Aquatic Trials. The next year he qualified for his first senior national team and earned himself a spot on the 2006 Pan Pacific Games team for Canada. He claimed a bronze medal (1500m freestyle) and a 5th-place finish in the 400m freestyle at the 2007 Pan American Games in Rio de Janeiro, Brazil. In 2008, Maitland placed 2nd in the 1500m freestyle at the Canadian Olympic trials.

Maitland has won a national title in the 1500m freestyle (2007 Spring National Championships or Pan Am Trials) and has won age group national titles in the 400m, 800m, and 1500m freestyle events. At the senior national level, he has also placed second and third in the 800m and 400m freestyle events respectively.

== College career ==
During the school year, Kier swam in Las Vegas, Nevada under the coach Jim Reitz.

In his freshman year of college, Kier won the 1650 yard freestyle at the Mountain West Conference Championships. He broke the all-time conference records in the 1000 yard (9:09.05) and 1650 yard (15:04.71) races. This swim also qualified him for NCAA Men's Swimming and Diving Championships.

During Kier's sophomore year of college, he was elected as a captain of the Rebel men's team; this effectively made Kier the first Sophomore captain for UNLV in over 25 years. At the Mountain west conference championships, he won the 1650 yard freestyle, 500 yard freestyle, and was on the winning 4x200y freestyle relay. He set championship records in the 500y, 1000y, and 1650y freestyle events with times of 4:20.75, 8:59.98, and 14:53.08 respectively. The 1000 and 1650 were also all-time conference records His swim in the mile made him the first person in the history of the Mountain West conference to break 9 minutes in the 1000 yard freestyle and 15 minutes in the 1650 yard freestyle. The 4x200 relay also set a new championship and conference record. His performance in the 1650 yard freestyle at the Mountain West Championships qualified him for the NCAA Men's Swimming and Diving Championships and earned him the Mountain West Conference Swimmer of the Year award.

During Kier's junior year of college, he was again elected as a captain of the UNLV men's team. At Mountain west conference he defended his title in the 1650y freestyle for the third consecutive year and the 500 and 4x200y freestyle relay for the second straight year. He set an all-time conference record in the 500y freestyle (4:19.86). His performance in the 1650 yard freestyle at the Mountain West Championships qualified him for the NCAA Men's Swimming and Diving Championships and earned him the Mountain West Conference Swimmer of the Year award for the second consecutive year.

At the NCAA Men's Swimming and Diving Championships, Kier finished 10th in the 1650y freestyle with a time of 14:55.95 and earned All-American honors.

== Personal bests ==
25 Yard Pool

200 yards freestyle: 1:37.33 <3

500 yards freestyle: 4:19.86

1000 yards freestyle: 8:59.98

1650 yards freestyle: 14:53.08

25 Meter Pool

200 meters freestyle: 1:47.91

400 meters freestyle: 3:46.81

800 meters freestyle: 7:46.68

1500 meters freestyle: 14:50.06

50 Meter Pool

200 meters freestyle: 1:52.42

400 meters freestyle: 3:52.44

800 meters freestyle: 7:59.45

1500 meters freestyle: 15:12.47
