= Zhang Lin (swimmer) =

Chinese swimmer (born 1987)

Personal information
- Full name: 张琳
- National team: China
- Born: 6 January 1987 (age 39) Beijing, China
- Height: 1.88 m (6 ft 2 in)
- Weight: 77 kg (170 lb)
- Spouse: Xue Chen

Sport
- Sport: Swimming
- Strokes: Freestyle
- College team: Beijing University of Technology
Medal record
Men's swimming
Representing China
International aquatics competitions
Event	1st	2nd	3rd
Olympic Games	0	1	0
World Championships (LC)	1	0	2
World Championships (SC)	0	1	0
Pan Pacific Championships	0	0	3
Asian Games	1	3	2
Total	2	5	7
Olympic Games
Silver medal – second place	2008 Beijing	400 m freestyle
World Championships (LC)
Gold medal – first place	2009 Rome	800 m freestyle
Bronze medal – third place	2009 Rome	400 m freestyle
Bronze medal – third place	2011 Shanghai	4×200 m freestyle
World Championships (SC)
Bronze medal – third place	2006 Shanghai	1500 m freestyle
Pan Pacific Championships
Bronze medal – third place	2006 Victoria	400 m freestyle
Bronze medal – third place	2010 Irvine	400 m freestyle
Bronze medal – third place	2010 Irvine	1500 m freestyle
Asian Games
Gold medal – first place	2010 Guangzhou	4×200 m freestyle
Silver medal – second place	2006 Doha	200 m freestyle
Silver medal – second place	2006 Doha	400 m freestyle
Silver medal – second place	2006 Doha	1500 m freestyle
Bronze medal – third place	2010 Guangzhou	400 m freestyle
Bronze medal – third place	2010 Guangzhou	1500 m freestyle

Zhang Lin (simplified Chinese: 张琳; traditional Chinese: 張琳; pinyin: Zhāng Lín; born 6 January 1987) is a retired Chinese competitive male swimmer. He is an Olympic silver medalist, world champion, and the current world-record holder in the 800 metre freestyle.

== Early and personal life ==
On 6 January 1987, Zhang was born in Haidian Deistrict, Beijing City. He is the second son to his parents Zhang Zhongquan (张仲泉) and Zhang Fenglan (张凤兰). He has an elder brother Zhang Cong (张琮) who is five years his senior. Both of his parents are employed by a property management company.

Zhang began swimming at the age of seven. In 2000, he decided to be a professional swimmer. His swimming idol is Australian Grant Hackett.

Zhang is an alumnus of Beijing 101 Middle School. Since 2016, Zhang has been studying in Beijing Sport University.

== Swimming ==
=== Career ===
Zhang specialized in the 200 m, 400 m, 800 m and 1500 m freestyle events. Zhang was selected for the national team in 2002.

At the 2003 World Aquatics Championships, he was the only Chinese male swimmer to reach the individual finals, finishing in eighth place. In 2005, he broke China's 400 freestyle record at the National Games, and was crowned 200 and 1,500 freestyle champion.

Zhang Lin won a silver medal in the men's 400 meter freestyle at the 2008 Summer Olympics in Beijing with a time of 3:42.44, 0.58 seconds behind gold medalist South Korean Park Tae-hwan, and making him at the time the third fastest 400 meter freestyler in history (and setting a Chinese Record in the process). Zhang's silver was the first Olympic swimming medal ever by a Chinese male swimmer.

At 2009 World Aquatics Championships in Rome, Zhang won a bronze medal in the men's 400 meter freestyle and a gold medal in the men's 800 meter freestyle (7:32.12); this was a world record and a first by a Chinese male in a world swimming competition in the past 73 years, and was also the penultimate men's swimming world record achieved in the high-tech slick-suit The high-tech slick-suits were immediately banned thereafter from official-sanctioned major competition use under new FINA regulations after the 2009 World Championships. Zhang was named 2009 Pacific Rim Male Swimmer of the Year by "Swimming World Magazine", it's also the first Chinese male swimmer to win this award.

Zhang was coached by Zhang Yadong and Chen Yinghong. He was also coached by Australian Denis Cotterell since late 2007, who was the former coach of distance champion Grant Hackett. In the fall of 2011, he trained with Dave Salo at the Trojan Swim Club for a 52-day training camp.

In 2010, Zhang found that he suffered a rare kind of asthma, and it led his decline. He missed the 2012 Summer Olympics.

Zhang announced his retirement around 2013. He sometimes attends some sport activities.

=== Major achievements ===
- 2005 World Championships - 6th 1500 m freestyle;
- 2005 National Games - 1st 200 m/ 400 m/ 1500 m freestyle;
- 2007 World Championships - 6th 200 m freestyle;
- 2008 Summer Olympics - 2nd (silver medalist) 400 m freestyle;
- 2009 World Aquatics Championships - 3rd (bronze medalist) 400 m freestyle; 3:41.35
- 2009 World Aquatics Championships - 1st (gold medalist) 800 m freestyle; world record 7:32.12

== See also ==
- List of Chinese records in swimming
- List of world records in swimming
- World record progression 800 metres freestyle

Records
Preceded by Grant Hackett	Men's 800 metre freestyle world record holder (long course); 29 July 2009 – present	Succeeded by Incumbent
Awards
Preceded by Kosuke Kitajima	Pacific Rim Swimmer of the Year; 2009	Succeeded by Kosuke Kitajima
