= Shogo Takeda =

Japanese swimmer (born 1995)

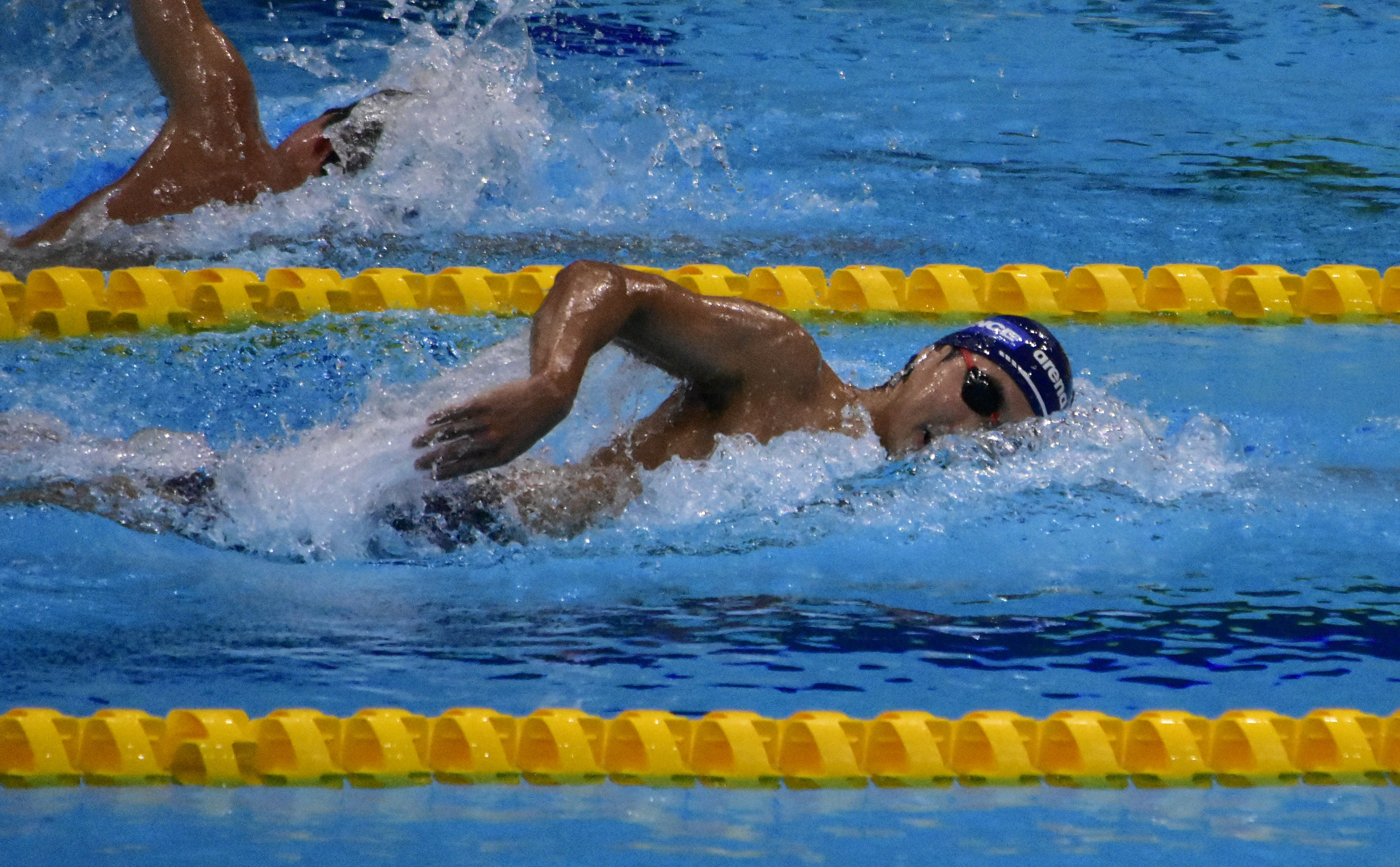

Personal information
- Born: 1 January 1995 (age 31)

Sport
- Sport: Swimming
- Strokes: Freestyle
Medal record
Men's swimming
Representing Japan
Asian Games
Silver medal – second place	2018 Jakarta	800 m freestyle
Bronze medal – third place	2022 Hangzhou	1500 m freestyle
Junior Pan Pacific Championships
Bronze medal – third place	2012 Honolulu	800 m freestyle

Shogo Takeda (竹田 渉瑚, Takeda Shōgo; born 1 January 1995) is a Japanese swimmer. He competed in the men's 800 metre freestyle event at the 2018 Asian Games, winning the silver medal.
