= Kohei Yamamoto (swimmer) =

Japanese swimmer

Personal information
- Full name: Kohei Yamamoto
- National team: Japan

Sport
- Sport: Swimming
- Strokes: Freestyle
Medal record
men's swimming
Representing Japan
Asian Games
Silver medal – second place	2014 Incheon	1500m freestyle
Summer Universiade
Gold medal – first place	2013 Kazan	800m freestyle
Silver medal – second place	2013 Kazan	400m freestyle
Silver medal – second place	2013 Kazan	1500m freestyle
Bronze medal – third place	2015 Gwanju	1500m freestyle

Kohei Yamamoto (山本 耕平, Yamamoto Kōhei) is a Japanese competitive swimmer that specializes in freestyle. He won the silver medal in the men's 1500m freestyle at the 2014 Asian Games. He has also won one gold, two silver, and a bronze in the Summer Universiade, in the 1500 meter freestyle, 800 meter freestyle, and the 400 meter freestyle. He has produced a total of five medals, with one gold, three silver, and one bronze.

== Swimming career ==
=== 2012 ===
In 2012, Kohei competed at the 2012 Short Course World championships. He finished ninth overall, with a time of 14:43.98, being eliminated in the semi-finals.

=== 2013 ===
In 2013, Kohei competed in the 2013 Summer Universiade. He swam in the 400 meter freestyle, and placed second and won the silver medal in that event, with a time of 3:49.03, 4-tenths of a second behind 1st place finisher Ryan Napoleon, who had a time of 3:48.96. He competed in the men's 1500 meter freestyle, also placing second, with a time of 15:00.15. His time was three seconds slower than first place finisher Sean Ryan. Kohei won the gold medal in the 800 meter freestyle, with a time of 7:49.96, two seconds faster than 2nd place finisher, Sergii Frolov. He later represented Japan in the 4x200 meter relay. Japan finished fourth.

=== 2014 ===
==== National Record ====
At the 2014 Japan Open, Kohei set a national record in the 1500 meter freestyle, clocking 14 minutes and 54.80 seconds.

==== Pan Pacific Championships ====
Kohei competed at the 2014 Pan Pacific Championships. He swam in the 800 meter freestyle, placing sixth with a time of 7:54.07. He also finished 6th in the 1500 meter freestyle, with a time of 14:57.71.

==== 2014 Asian Games ====
At the 2014 Asian Games, Kohei placed fourth in the 400 meter freestyle, with a time of 3:51.09. Later, he went on to win the silver medal in the 1500 meter freestyle, with a time of 14:54.86, five seconds slower than 1st place finisher Sun Yang.

==== 2014 World Short Course Championships ====
Kohei competed at the 2014 Short Course World championships. He swam in the 1500 meter freestyle, and placed 12th overall with a time of 14:42.55.

=== 2015 ===
Kohei competed at the 2015 Summer Universiade. He swam in the 1500 meter and 800 meter freestyle. In the 800 meter freestyle, he placed eighth with a time of 8:03.69. He later swam in the 1500 meter freestyle, winning the bronze medal with a time of 15:03.99.

=== 2016 Japan Olympic Trials ===
At the Japan Olympic trials, Kohei failed to qualify for the 2016 Summer Olympics, although he finished 1st in the 1500 meter freestyle. He had a time of 14:57.12, but couldn't qualify because the requirement to qualify for the Olympics was 14:55.30.
